= Mike Carlson =

American–born British television pundit

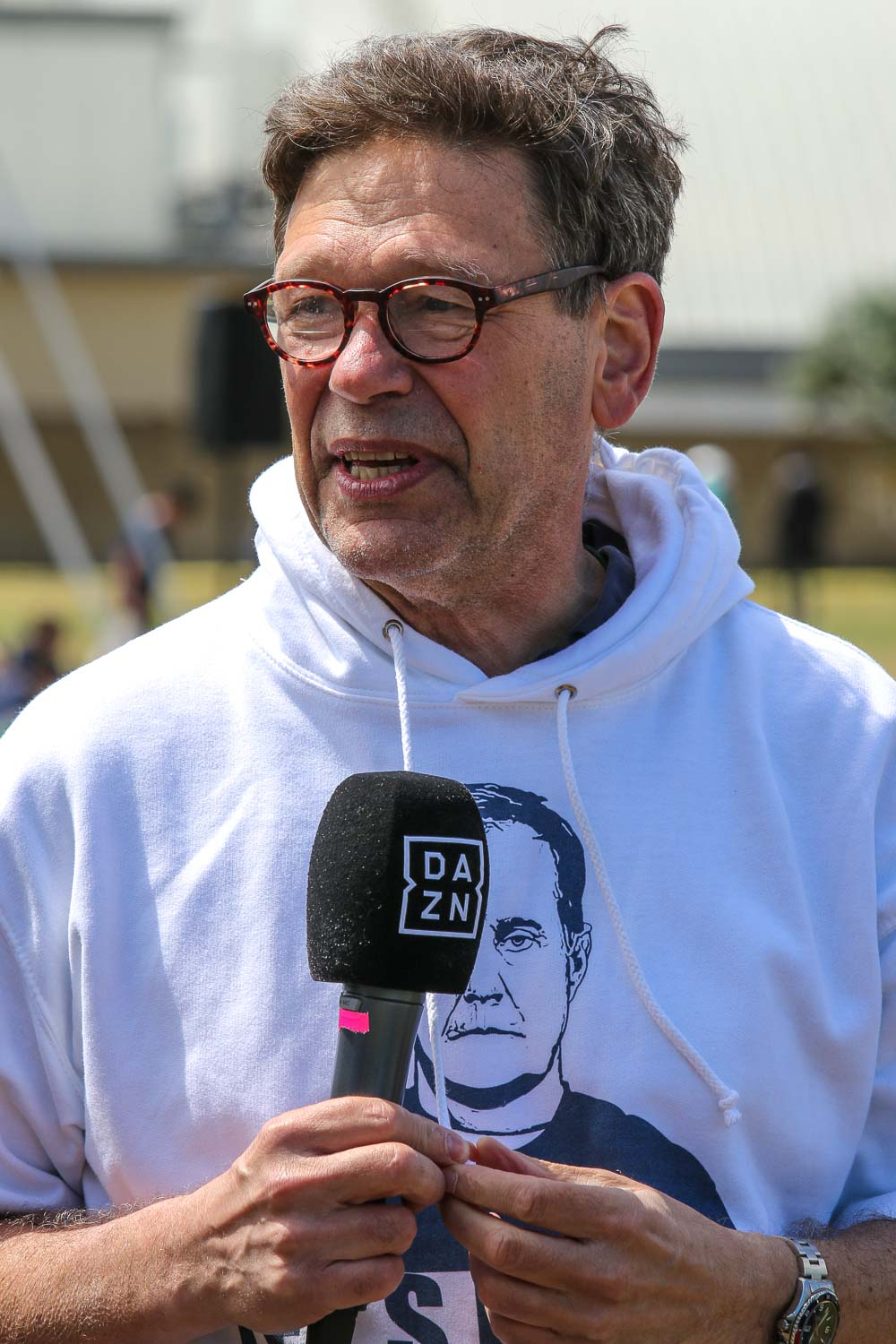
- Carlson at NFL London Summer Bowl in 2017
- Born: Michael Roy Carlson; 12 March 1951 (age 75); Connecticut, U.S.
- Education: Wesleyan University (BA) McGill University (MA)
- Occupations: Television pundit, radio commentator, writer, journalist
- Television: Channel 4's NFL coverage BBC's Super Bowl coverage Sky Sports WLAF/NFL Europe coverage, Major League Baseball coverage
- Height: 6 ft 3 in (191 cm)
- Website: irresistibletargets.blogspot.com

Michael Roy Carlson (born 12 March 1951) is an American–born British television pundit of National Football League (NFL) coverage in the United Kingdom. He worked on Channel Five's coverage of the sport from 1998 to 2010 and Channel 4's coverage of the sport from 2010 to 2015. He was also the main analyst for BBC's coverage of the Super Bowl between 2008-2013 and 2016–2017. He also commentated on BBC's coverage of basketball at the 2012 Olympics and the 2016 Olympics. He is originally from Connecticut, US.

== Career ==
Carlson played defensive end at Milford Academy as an underage academic scholarship student on a largely post-graduate teams. He played lacrosse as a freshman, then lettered in basketball and track as senior (running the 440 and 4×220). He played football, as a tight end, and lacrosse, at all four positions, at Wesleyan University from 1968 to 1972 (where he was a contemporary of Bill Belichick, with whom he played lacrosse in 1972, when he was a senior and Belichick a freshman). After taking an MA in English at McGill University in Montreal, with a creative writing thesis (a book of poems called The Apprehensions), he moved to the UK in 1977, Carlson worked as a sports editor for the television news agency UPITN before joining ABC Sports as their director of programming in Europe. Later he became vice-president of European operations for Major League Baseball before beginning his freelance career. In 1991, he teamed up with Nick Halling to cover Major League Baseball for satellite station Screensport, a partnership which continued with the World League of American Football, and during the early years of the league's successor, NFL Europe, on Sky Sports.

In 1994, Carlson left Major League Baseball and became a freelance journalist. He reviews books and film, and wrote three books in the Pocket Essentials series, on the film directors Sergio Leone, Clint Eastwood, and Oliver Stone. He also writes obituaries for The Guardian and The Independent and on sport for a number of outlets, including NFLUK.com. On screen he has also appeared occasionally as a baseball pundit on MLB on Five hosted by Jonny Gould, a sport he previously presented on Sky Sports in the mid-1990s. He also wrote the Channel Five Guide To Baseball. He is the commentator for World Baseball Classic on Eurosport. He has covered a variety of other sports on television including Basketball, Poker, Soccer, and Lacrosse. He has worked behind the scenes on the television coverage of both Olympic Games and FIFA World Cup tournaments. In 2000, he and Mark Webster provided commentary for the Meridian TV and ITV2 series Trans-Atlantic Wrestling Challenge. On 21 May 2011, Carlson called a college football game at the Sheikh Amri Abeid Memorial Stadium in Arusha, Tanzania, which hosted the first game of college American football to be played on the African continent. Since 2010 he has returned to Channel 4 to provide punditry for the 2011–12 NFL season and co-hosted the American sports podcast Americarnage with Nat Coombs and Dan Louw from 2011 to 2016.

Carlson was the lead commentator for the BBC's coverage of the basketball at the 2012 Olympics, alongside co-commentator John Amaechi. Whilst commentating after the finish of the quarter-final game between Argentina and Brazil, Carlson was hit on the head by a rogue basketball that had been kicked into the stands by Argentinian player Pablo Prigioni – his bewildered reaction became a popular video on the internet. He was also part of the commentary team for the BBC's coverage of the basketball at the 2016 Olympics, alongside Australian sports broadcasters Mark Chester, Matthew Hill, Steve Robilliard and Vitor Sobral.

== NFL ==
In 1998, the United Kingdom terrestrial TV station Channel 5 began covering Monday Night Football for which Carlson was the regular analyst from the start until the channel's coverage ended in 2010. During this time he worked with hosts Martin Bayfield, Josh Chetwynd, Mark Webster, Simon Golding, Colin Murray and Nat Coombs. He contributed to now-defunct weekly American football newspaper First Down and covered NFL Europe for NFL.com, Pro Football Weekly, the International Herald Tribune, and for a couple of seasons, The Guardian.

Carlson developed a few strange "catchphrases" during his commentary of NFL highlights broadcast during gaps in the live game, including a list of alternative names for stadia and teams e.g. Arizona Crads (half-Card, half crap), Newark Airport Jets & New Jersey Giants, "he couldn't be more alone if he was..." for touchdowns scored by players with nobody around them, with the punchline usually involving a celebrity or famous figure that has been caught with their trousers down, to making special note of anyone involved named "Nate", the name of his son. He often refers to player Torry Holt as "The Torry You Can Support" – a jibe at the Conservative Party's recent misfortunes in UK politics (they are known as the Tories). He also refers to Reggie Bush as "The Bush you can support" – a jibe at George W. Bush. Another common catchphrase is "and that pass was high, but not in the Ricky Williams sense," referring to the player's use of marijuana. He developed a fictional award named "Trent of the Week" for the best player in the week's games named Trent. Some of Carlson's more elaborate comedic moments involved complex re-wordings of The Raven during a rough patch for the Baltimore Ravens, and singing a re-lyricised version of John Brown's Body entitled Jeff George Is Marching On – to a particularly miserable Dallas Cowboys performance, which included noted quarterback bust Ryan Leaf.

Carlson was one of the analysts for the BBC's inaugural coverage of the Super Bowl in February 2008, hosted by Jake Humphrey, with Rod Woodson as his partner. He returned to analyse for the BBC during their first live regular season game at Wembley in October 2008, with Jerry Rice, again at Super Bowl XLIII, with Rod Woodson, and briefly during the recorded highlights of the 2009 Wembley match. He has also appeared on BBC Sport's "American Football" programme showing highlights of the playoffs during the 2009/10 season. Carlson has continued his work on the BBC, providing analysis in the highlights shows for both the International Series and Playoffs for the 2010/11 and 2011/12 season. Carlson joined Mark Chapman and Danny Amendola, of the St. Louis Rams, for the BBC's coverage of Super Bowl XLVI on 5–6 February 2012.

On 6 September 2010 it was announced that Carlson would present Sunday Night Football on Channel 4. He was paired with Gary Imlach for the 2010 season and Danny Kelly in the 2011 season. Nat Coombs was announced as his new co-presenter for the 2012 season, re-forming their Channel 5 (and Americarnage) partnership. Channel 4's NFL coverage ended in 2015, and Carlson's coverage of live television games for the 2015 and 2016 seasons was limited to the BBC's coverage of the International Series and the Super Bowl. He has continued to appear on the BBC's coverage of live games alongside Mark Chapman, Jason Bell, and Osi Umenyiora.

In September 2017, Carlson joined Talksport as part of their live NFL coverage, and in 2018 launched his own Patreon.com site, Friday Morning Tight End, in which he picked every game of the NFL season, with a 67% success rate.

== Personal ==
Carlson has been married twice. In addition he has written three books about movie directors (Sergio Leone, Clint Eastwood and Oliver Stone), is a published poet, has written on arts, sports and politics for many newspapers and websites, and is a blogger
