= MLB on 5 Live =

MLB on 5 Live is the banner title for all live Major League Baseball commentary broadcast on BBC Radio 5 Live Sports Extra. The show began on July 4, 2010 and was originally hosted by Jonny Gould and Josh Chetwynd, with Nat Coombs hosting when Gould was unavailable. For the 2011 season, Coombs took over hosting duties from Gould on a full-time basis, with Simon Brotherton in turn covering when Coombs is unavailable.

For the 2010 and 2011 Major League Baseball seasons, the show was typically aired live from 18:00 or 19:00 on a Sunday evening. unless there was a clash with 5 Live Sport Extra's other live commentary commitments. For 2012, this moved to Thursdays at 18:00 with Coombs & Chetwynd once again the presenting duo.

MLB on 5 Live also broadcast special live commentary of Opening Day (2012–present), the All-Star Game (2010–present), as well as live coverage of every game of the World Series (2010–present).

Coverage is also available to listen to on demand for a period of seven days after the original broadcast courtesy of BBC iPlayer.
