= Lengel =

Lengel may refer to:

== Persons ==
- David Lengel, American journalist
- Edward G. Lengel, American historian

== Institutions ==
- D.H.H. Lengel Middle School
