= National Agreement =

National Agreement (baseball) may refer to one of the following in the sport of baseball in the United States:

- National Agreement of 1883, between the National League, American Association, and Northwestern League to bind the leagues to respect each other's valid player contracts including reserve lists; later adopted by various other minor leagues
- National Agreement of 1903, between the National League and the American League to recognize each other as major leagues and to codify the reserve clause system
