= David Lengel =

British television presenter

David Lengel is a baseball journalist who formerly worked alongside Jonny Gould on MLB on Five, a TV programme on UK channel Five.

== Career ==
David presented five's UK baseball coverage for a period of 18 months between 2003 and 2005. For part of this stint on MLB on five David was also working as a producer on ESPN's 25th Anniversary series called Who's #1, and as a result commuted some 7000 miles between shows, doing so for ten consecutive weeks in the Spring of 2004. His trip involved leaving New York on Saturday night, arriving Sunday morning, working on MLB on Five that night, and leaving London on the first flight out on Monday morning. Prior to the 2006 season David left for a new job as host on mlb.com. There he hosted The Daily Rewind for a brief period of time before being moved to State of the Yankees, which is released every Wednesday on yankees.com. Recently, he has returned to five for the live 2006 All Star Game coverage from PNC Park, the regular On The Beat feature (which he himself devised) and twice for MLB on Five as a guest pundit. David also writes for The Guardian newspaper in the UK.
