= Nat Coombs =

British television and radio presenter, and writer

- Born: Nathaniel George Terence Coombs; August 1977 (age 49); London, England
- Occupations: Television & radio presenter, writer
- Years active: 2005–present

Nathaniel George Terence Coombs (born August 1977) is a British television and radio presenter, podcaster, writer and founder of a London based media agency.

== Education ==
Coombs was educated at the boys' independent school Dulwich College in Dulwich, South London, and at University College London.

== Early career ==
=== Comedy ===
He began his career as a stand up comedian and was a semi-finalist at the BBC New Comedy Awards and a runner-up of Stand-up Britain on ITV. He was also a Regional Finalist of the Jongleurs J20 competition and a Semi-finalist in both the Amused Moose & Laughing Horse New Act competitions. Early in his career appeared on the BBC Radio comedy program 'Spanking New' alongside comedians including Rhod Gilbert and Shappi Khorsandi which featured live performances from some of the UK's best new comedy talent.

Whilst working as a comedian, Coombs created the innovative digital comedy show Chelsey OMG which he wrote and co-produced. The first series of the show, based on his character Chelsey Pucks, which originally appeared on Radio 1 comedy sketch show The Milk Run, debuted on the online social networking site Bebo. The show drew critical acclaim for its interactive format, whereby the characters interact with the show's fans. Coombs appears in the show as Jens, a German fashion photographer.

Coombs also co-starred in the BAFTA-nominated BBC drama Can You Hear Me Thinking? alongside Judi Dench.

== Television and Radio ==
Coombs is primarily a sports presenter — specialising in football and US Sports – and has worked with BBC, Channel 4, Channel 5, ESPN, The Guardian, Bleacher Report, The Times and Talksport.

=== NFL ===
In 2007 Coombs began presenting Channel 5's live NFL American football coverage, alongside Mike Carlson broadcasting all Sunday Night Football and some Monday Night Football games. He hosted Channel 5 coverage between 2007-2010 and also co-presented NFL: UK, a weekly magazine show, also on Channel 5 that was shown on Saturday mornings, alongside Trevor Nelson and Natalie Pinkham.

In 2010 Coombs moved to BBC Radio Five Live where he anchored live games weekly. He moved to Channel 4 in 2012, hosting NFL Live every Sunday alongside Mike Carlson, as well as the NFL International Series games and the Super Bowl. He also worked alongside Vernon Kay for a weekly NFL highlights show.

In 2015, the BBC agreed to a TV deal with the NFL where Coombs was named as one of the hosts, anchoring the majority of the NFL London games between 2015-2022 as well as Super Bowl LVI. In 2025 he was announced as FIVE's anchor for the NFL International Series games from Dublin and London alongside Osi Umenyiora.

He currently anchors live coverage for the TalkSport radio network, including a weekly live show and contributes regularly to The Times.

=== Basketball ===
In 2020 Coombs was announced as the lead anchor on Sky Sports for British Basketball League (BBL) coverage working alongside former players including Kieron Achara MBE, Drew Lasker and Mike Tuck.

=== Football ===
Coombs has presented football coverage for ESPN, TalkSport, The Guardian, Bleacher Report and Goal.

As one of ESPN UK's main live studio hosts between 2010-2013, he presented the live studio football show Talk of the Terrace in its various formats, as well as being the regular anchor for the channel's live Bundesliga studio coverage. He also anchored live football coverage from Serie A and Ligue 1. Coombs often interviews players and provides features for other ESPN football output.

In 2013, he presented a range of football coverage for the global football site Goal.com and in June 2014 began work with The Guardian fronting much of its football video content, including a daily World Cup show which took a satirical look back at the previous night's action.

Since 2013 Coombs has hosted on commercial UK Sports Radio station TalkSport as an anchor, where he has hosted various shows including Kick Off, Football First, Transfer Tavern and The European Football Show.

== Other broadcasting ==
=== MLB ===
Coombs presented Major League Baseball (MLB) coverage, including the World Series, on BBC Radio, where he was the regular host of the weekly MLB show between 2010–2013.

=== The Nat Coombs Show ===
In 2018 Coombs launched his NFL podcast, The Nat Coombs Show, which he moved to ESPN in 2019.

== Other work ==
=== Business ventures ===
Coombs has been involved with a number of media businesses, including founding and leading the creative agency MeMo.

== Personal life ==
Coombs has followed the National Football League since he was a child and is a fan of the Miami Dolphins. He is a fan of the English football team West Ham United who he watches regularly and is the top ranked celebrity fan of ESPN's Five Time Award Winning "Fantasy Focus: Football 06010" daily podcast, hosted by Field Yates and Matthew Berry. Coombs makes an annual appearance on the podcast, usually during the week of which an NFL game will be played in Britain. He's married and lives in London.
