= Memory Bank (British game show) =

Production
- Running time: 30 Minutes (April–June 2004); 60 minutes (June–October 2004)
- Production company: Endemol UK Productions Midlands

Original release
- Network: Five
- Release: 2 April 2004 – October 2004

Memory Bank is a daytime gameshow which was shown on Five in the UK. It featured several rounds of memory themed games. In the final round, the contestant was shown twenty words and each word remembered was worth a cash prize.

The show was presented by Jonathan Gould and Rachel Pierman. Three contestants were featured in each episode. The show shared a similar format to Five's popular daytime quiz BrainTeaser, sometimes described as its sister show. Both featured viewer puzzles where viewers at home could call in to win cash prizes. Initially the series had a flatter structure than BrainTeaser, in that all three contestants participated in all of the rounds until the final, where only the one with the highest score would proceed; however, in June 2004 the series was revamped to follow a pattern later adopted by BrainTeaser whereby one contestant was eliminated at a time until eventually only one contestant remained.

The show, which began in April 2004, was last aired in October 2004; originally episodes were 30 minutes in length, and this format produced moderately high enough viewing figures to convince Five to extend the show to an hour in length by June 2004 in an attempt to emulate the more competitive format of BrainTeaser; however, this would eventually transpire to be series' undoing, as the new format proved less popular with viewers; having failed to repeat the success of BrainTeaser following the extension in length, Five cancelled Memory Bank in October 2004.
