= MLB on Five =

- Presented by: Tommy Boyd (1997); Jonny Gould (1997–2008); Josh Chetwynd (2001–2008)
- Country of origin: United Kingdom
- No. of episodes: 500+

Production
- Producer: Sunset + Vine
- Running time: 3:00 – 6:00 (per episode)

Original release
- Network: Channel 5
- Release: March 1997 – December 2008

MLB on Five was a sports television programme on Channel 5 in the UK providing live coverage of Major League Baseball games, broadcast between 1997 and 2008. It was usually broadcast on Sunday (going into Monday morning) and Wednesday nights (going into Thursday). The Sunday broadcasts usually began at around 1 am BST leading into the live Sunday Night Baseball telecast, while the Wednesday programme began at various times and the game was usually shown with a one- to two-hour delay. Five also provided live coverage of the All-Star Game and World Series.

Regular-season game commentary was taken direct from ESPN; All-Star Game and World Series broadcasts typically used the MLB International feed.

== History ==
=== 1997–2001 ===
The show was first broadcast on Opening Day in 1997 with a game between the defending World Series champion New York Yankees and the Seattle Mariners. It was initially part of the channel's "Live & Dangerous" late night sport strand; however, by the 1998 season it had been separated and renamed MLB on Five. For its first eighteen months, the show was sponsored by Coors Extra Gold, complete with break bumpers with the voice-over "Major League Baseball: a taste of real America in association with Coors Extra Gold". By June in the 1998 season, this sponsorship deal had ended, and the show did not have a sponsor after that time.

The original hosts of the show were Tommy Boyd and Todd Macklin. Macklin had originally been hired as a producer for the show and was only put into the analyst role when no one else could be found. "Did Elvis like baseball?" enquired Boyd in one exchange. "Could he eat it?" replied Macklin.

A little over a month into the show's first season, Boyd phoned in ill before a show and never returned (joking references were still occasionally made long afterwards on the show about his lengthy illness). Boyd has since made comments stating that he hated baseball, including describing it as "glorified rounders".

After a few shows with a number of guest hosts, Jonny Gould was brought in on a three-show trial and remained the host until the show's conclusion.

During these first few years, the popularity of the show blossomed with audiences reaching over one million (a huge figure for a show broadcast in the early hours of the morning) during the 2000 World Series. During this time the show also increased audience participation, encouraging viewers to write (and later e-mail) their comments, questions and anything else. During the 1998 season, they encouraged viewers embarking on trips to ballparks in the US and Canada to send in postcards of the stadiums they visited with the aim of collecting one from each of the thirty ballparks.

At this point in the programme's history, the show was broadcast from the same studio as 5 News, which went on air at 6 am. Therefore, if a game ever went past 5 am, alternative studio arrangements had to be hastily made. An example of this was during Game 5 of the 2000 World Series, in which the presenters, suddenly in a tiny studio without the benefit of monitors to watch the post game presentation, mused on who the MVP may be. Sky News now produces Channel 5's news bulletins.

In 2001, Macklin returned to Canada with his wife, whose job in London was the reason he had become involved in the show in the first place.

=== 2001–2003 ===
A replacement was eventually found in the shape of Josh Chetwynd, a catcher for the British national team who had played the game at college and Minor League level and was now working for MLB International in London. His previous experience as a player at a relatively high level also meant that he could offer a player's perspective on the game. In addition, he spotlighted Major League players with whom he had a personal connection ("the Chet Factor").

Chetwynd left the show in the middle of the 2003 season to study a postgraduate law degree at the University of Arizona.

=== 2003–2005 ===
In July 2003, Chetwynd was replaced by David Lengel, who had also been a semi-regular reporter/analyst for Five's MLB coverage. Lengel's reporting duties included on-site coverage from the World Series. For part of his full-time stint, Lengel was also working as a producer on ESPN's 25th anniversary series Who's #1.

=== 2006–2008 ===
Chetwynd, having completed law school, returned to the show in 2006, although Lengel filled in when necessary. The Five team presented coverage on-site for the first time as Gould and Chetwynd hosted Five's broadcast of the 2006 All-Star game, won by the American League, from PNC Park in Pittsburgh. In 2007, they were again inside the stadium for the All-Star game this time at AT&T Park, home of the San Francisco Giants.

=== 2009 ===
At the end of 2008, there were rumours that, as a part of a cost-cutting measure, Five would cease its MLB coverage, and would not broadcast the 2009 MLB season, alongside proposals to cut its NFL, NBA and NHL coverage after their respective seasons ended. The cancellation of the broadcasts was confirmed in an e-mail sent by Gould to all those who were part of the BSUK fantasy baseball.

Eight different team won the World Series since during the show's twelve seasons on air: Yankees (3), Marlins (2), Red Sox (2), Diamondbacks, Angels, White Sox, Cardinals and Phillies.

== Spin-off podcast ==
Although not affiliated with the original Five show, The Jonny & Josh Show podcast launched in July 2020 and saw Gould and Chetwynd reunited to host along with the producer of MLB on Five, Erik Janssen, with guest appearances from previous MLB on Five reporter/analyst Lengel. The podcast is a weekly round-up of news and talking points during the Major League Baseball season, aimed primarily at a UK audience. There are additional weekly episodes focusing on fantasy baseball advice.

== Presenters ==
- Jonny Gould (host, 1997–2008)
- Pat Garrigan (analyst, 2001)
- Brett Barash (analyst 2001)
- Josh Chetwynd (analyst, 2001–2003, 2006–2008)
- David Lengel (analyst, 2003–2005, occasional guest analyst since 2006)
- Todd Macklin (analyst, 1997–2001)
- Mike Carlson (occasional guest analyst since 1998)
- Vince Garcia (occasional guest analyst since 1998)
- Tommy Boyd (host, 1997)
- Mark Webster (occasional guest host)
- Paul Romanuk (occasional guest host)

== Regular features ==
A number of segments appear before the game or in between innings. In addition to entertaining the audience, these exist because UK broadcasting standards effectively prevent Five from running commercials every time the US broadcasters do so.

=== MLB Roundup ===
Almost every episode features a brief round-up of the main events and games of the last few days. In the early years of the show this was usually done in a half-hour segment at the start of the show; however, as the start of the show has been pushed back closer to the game's first pitch this changed to breaks in play. On Wednesdays, ESPN broadcast scores and highlights from the night's other games, although the entire telecast is usually on a short-delay.

=== On the Beat ===
Because the show generally consists of the ESPN Sunday and Wednesday Night Baseball games there are often many teams that are not shown. To compensate for this, David Lengel created the on the Beat segment, which offers a telephone interview with a beat writer or local TV commentator of a given team. The segment has also featured a handful of Hall of Fame writers and broadcasters.

=== In-Game Trivia ===
In-Game Trivia consists of the producer of the show, Erik Janssen (or when Erik is absent whoever is standing in as producer), setting an obscure trivia question which the pundit has to answer.

=== 7th-inning Stretch ===
In 2002, Gould started stretching his arm while saying "7th-inning stretch". This became a tradition on the show with he and Chetwynd performing 'the stretch' every show.

=== British Baseball Roundup ===
Every Sunday during the British Baseball season, the show gave an update on the results and standings of the British National League, the top level of British Baseball. From 1998 the show had also been at the Final 4 tournament (formerly at Brighton, latterly at Croydon Pirates) and showed highlights on that week's show.

=== Fantasy Baseball ===
During the show's final two seasons, the show, in conjunction with BaseballSoftballUK, organised an internet-based fantasy baseball league for aspiring players throughout the UK, on which they offered an update on every Sunday. The game, Fantasy Baseball UK, continued after the show stopped broadcasting.

=== One-Minute Blitz ===
During the middle of the 7th inning, Chetwynd tried to answer as many viewer e-mails as he could in under sixty seconds. He usually replies "yes" or "no" to each question instinctively. The record was seventeen questions.

=== The Good, The Bad and The Ugly ===
Alternatively in the middle of the 7th inning, a series of clips from that week's MLB games are shown. These range from the best plays of the week (the Good), embarrassing mess-ups (the Bad), and the bizarre or excruciating (the Ugly).

=== 1 Minute Rant ===
This involves Jonny or Josh ranting about a particular issue, such as Barry Bonds' pursuit of the home run record.

=== Ballpark Breakdowns ===
Added during the 2007 season, Josh describes size, shape, key features and other points of interest of MLB fields and stadiums.

=== Weaver Watch/Granderson Watch ===
One of the more popular segments of the show followed the misfortunes of the pitcher Jeff Weaver, who experienced an unsuccessful spell with the New York Yankees in 2003. The segment was titled "Weaver Watch" and consisted of highlights of his starts coupled with a little mockery. The feature ran sporadically thereafter, ending with his win in the 2006 World Series for the St. Louis Cardinals.

In 2007, Five created the Granderson Watch, following Detroit Tigers outfielder Curtis Granderson. As part of Granderson Watch, Granderson answered a viewer e-mail question during each Sunday game.

=== Baseball Library ===
During the "7th-inning Stretch" on Sunday shows throughout 2008, Gould and Chetwynd often threw over to the baseball "curator" Phill Jupitus, who read an excerpt from the week's chosen book. Books read include The Natural, The Boys of Summer and Veeck as in Wreck.
