= Talk of the Terrace =

Talk of the Terrace is a British ESPN Magazine show hosted on Mondays between 6.30-8.00pm during the football season.

== Presenters ==
The first series was hosted by BBC Sport presenter Mark Chapman and former Sky Sports and Setanta host Kelly Cates. In August 2010 it was announced that Nat Coombs had replaced Chapman as the co-host of the show for the 2010–11 season.

== Format ==
The show is filmed in ESPN's football studio and the table is taken out and sofa put in with a terrace back drop. Viewers can contact Kelly and Nat through Twitter and Facebook. They are joined by 3 guests, maybe a current or ex player or manager, or an ESPN pundit and by celebrities who support a team who give their views on the action.

The show also includes weekly features from Richard Lenton and Chris Cohen
