= National Agreement of 1903 =

Established the structure of Major League Baseball

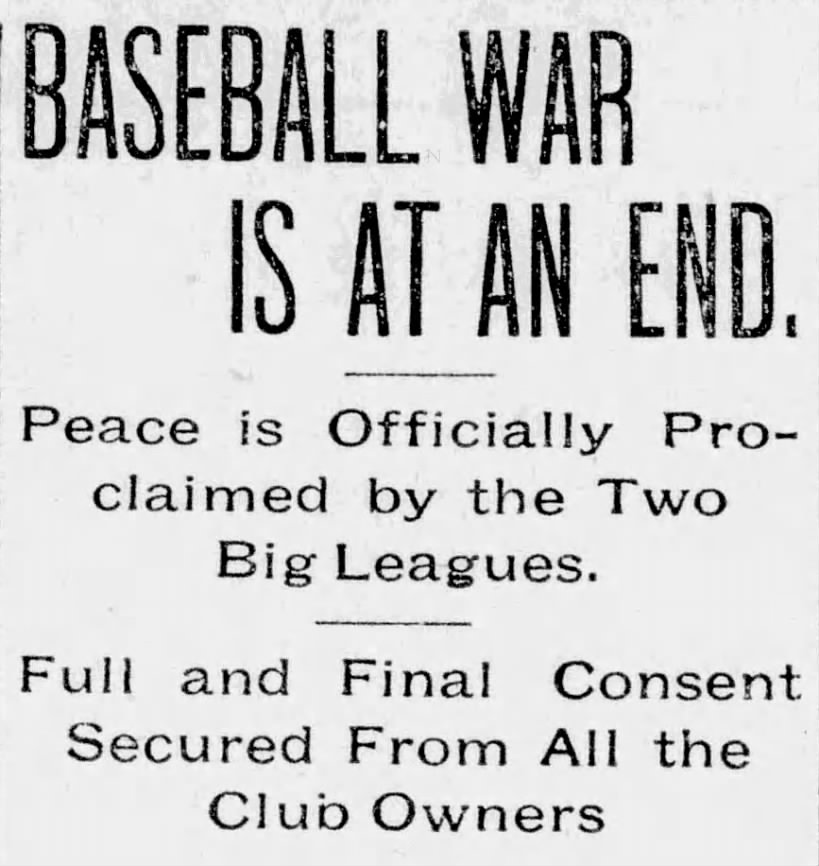
- Front-page newspaper headline in The Plain Dealer of Cleveland
- Created: January 10, 1903; 123 years ago
- Location: Cincinnati, Ohio, U.S.
- Author(s): Ban Johnson, Charles Comiskey, and other franchise owners
- Signatories: Representatives of the American League and National League
- Purpose: Mutual recognition of leagues and codify player control mechanisms, notably the reserve clause

The National Agreement of 1903 ended the "baseball war" between the American League and National League and established the structure now known as Major League Baseball (MLB), although the two leagues remained independent legal entities until 2000. The agreement, negotiated primarily by American League president Ban Johnson and key owners including Charles Comiskey, codified the reserve clause system that controlled player movement for the next seven decades.

== Background ==
The American League (AL), founded in 1901 under Ban Johnson's leadership, had challenged the baseball monopoly of the National League (NL) by raiding its rosters and placing franchises in National League cities. After two years of costly competition for players, both leagues recognized the need for a peace agreement to stabilize the business of baseball.

== Key provisions ==
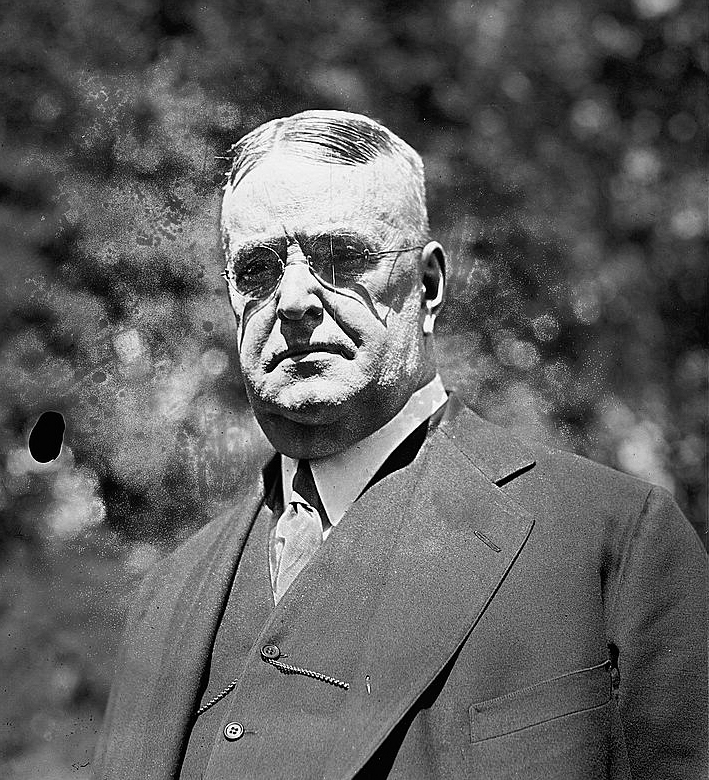
Ban Johnson, 1921

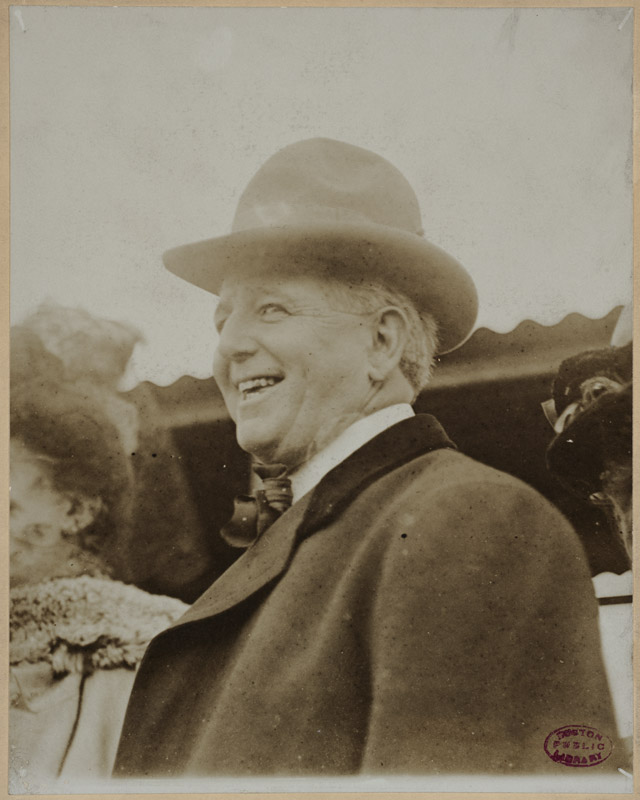
Charles Comiskey, c. 1910

=== League structure ===
The agreement established:

- Recognition of each league as a major league with exclusive territorial rights
- A three-member National Commission to govern baseball (AL president, NL president, and a chairman)
- Rules for player contracts and transfers between leagues
- Agreement to honor each other's contracts and reserve lists

=== Reserve clause codification ===
The National Agreement formalized and strengthened the reserve clause, which had existed informally since 1879. Under the agreement:

- Teams could reserve players in perpetuity, even after contracts expired
- Players could not negotiate with other teams without their current team's permission
- A player who refused his team's contract offer could only quit professional baseball entirely
- Teams could trade, sell, or release players at will
- The system applied uniformly across both major leagues and recognized minor leagues

This system, co-authored by Charles Comiskey and Johnson, created what New York Supreme Court Justice Herbert Bissell would later call "as complete a monopoly of the baseball business for profit as any monopoly can be made."

== Legal challenges ==
=== American League Baseball Club of Chicago v. Chase (1914) ===
The first successful legal challenge to the National Agreement's reserve system came in 1914 when Hal Chase exercised a 10-day termination clause in his contract with Comiskey's Chicago White Sox to sign with the Buffalo Blues of the Federal League. Comiskey sought an injunction, but New York Supreme Court Justice Herbert Bissell ruled that the reserve clause violated common law, finding it "invades the right to labor as a property right" and "invades the right to contract as a property right."

Following Chase's legal victory, American League president Ban Johnson declared that Chase would "never play with any other club" if he left for the Federal League. Johnson later acknowledged in 1918 that Chase had been "overtly blacklisted" for his challenge to the reserve clause.

=== Federal Baseball Club v. National League (1922) ===
The Supreme Court ruled in Federal Baseball Club v. National League that baseball was not interstate commerce and therefore not subject to federal antitrust laws, effectively protecting the National Agreement's monopolistic structure.

== Enforcement and penalties ==
Under the National Agreement, discipline was administered through:

- Fines (typically $25–$100 for minor infractions)
- Suspensions (usually brief, 3–10 games)
- Placement on the "ineligible list" (baseball's blacklist)
- Informal blacklisting for challenging the system

Between 1903 and 1914, most penalties were minor fines or brief suspensions. The harshest punishments were typically reserved for players who challenged the reserve system itself, as demonstrated in the Chase case.

== Impact on labor relations ==
The National Agreement created a system that baseball historian Robert Burk called "baseball peonage," binding players to teams with no ability to negotiate freely. Players had no union representation and no recourse except the courts, which generally upheld baseball's exemption from antitrust laws after 1922.

The agreement remained largely unchanged until the formation of the Major League Baseball Players Association (MLBPA) and the eventual dismantling of the reserve clause through the Seitz decision in 1975.

== Dissolution ==
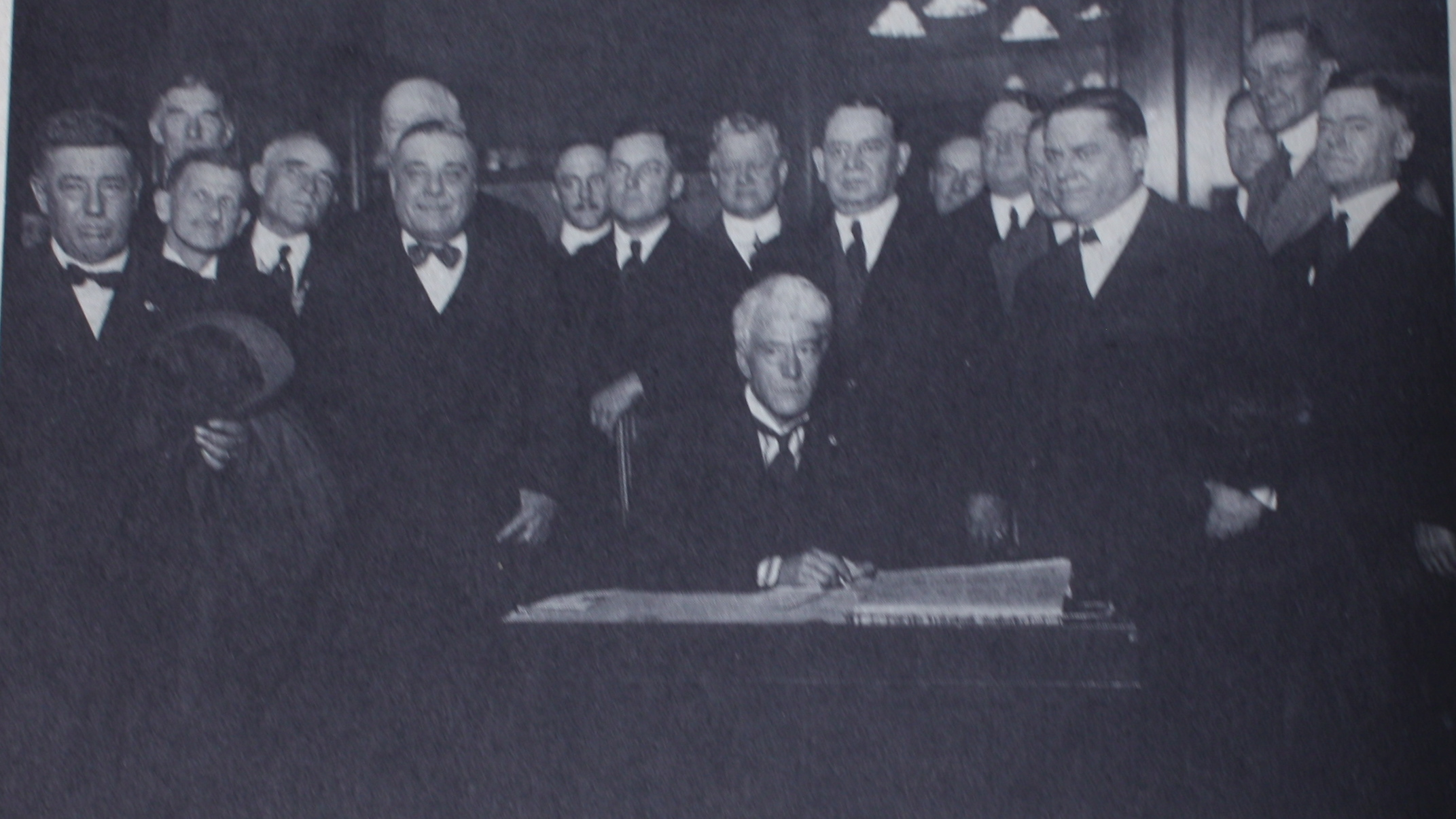
Landis, surrounded by baseball owners and officials, signs an agreement to be Commissioner of Baseball (1920)

The National Agreement structure lasted until Kenesaw Mountain Landis was appointed as the first Commissioner of Baseball in 1920, following the Black Sox Scandal. Landis replaced the three-member National Commission with singular authority, though the reserve clause system established by the agreement continued until 1975.

== Legacy ==
The National Agreement established the fundamental structure of the major leagues that persisted for most of the 20th century. Its codification of the reserve clause created decades of labor disputes and legal challenges, from Hal Chase in 1914 to Curt Flood in 1970 to the eventual establishment of free agency.
