= Jonathan Gould (presenter) =

British television presenter

Jonathan Michael Gould (born 1961 in Kenya) is a British television presenter and charity fundraiser. He is best known for hosting the late-night baseball show MLB on Five from 1997 until 2008, which soon built up a cult following on the newly-launched Channel 5. He has been described as 'a near ubiquitous presence at London charity fundraising dinners'

== Education ==
Gould attended Epsom College, where he was active in school plays and captained the college cricket team. He left in 1979 with A-Levels in Economics, History and English, which he himself says were "highly unsatisfactory", but nonetheless obtained a place at Durham University. He was a member of the Hatfield College rugby team and the Durham University Sensible Thespians (DUST) sketch group, which would later be renamed the Durham Revue.

== Career ==
=== Early career ===
After finishing drama school, Gould embarked on a career as an actor and landed a small role in the 1984 fantasy film and infamous Box-office bomb Sheena, but his appearance was cut in the editing process. He spent the next decade working various restaurant jobs, plus stints as a motorcycle dispatch rider and house painter, with his most significant acting gig being the lead in a production of Macbeth that went on a 3-month tour of Japan.

In September 1994 Gould made the move into presenting after an introduction arranged by school friend Jonathan Maitland, joining Cable 17 TV, a Telewest channel for viewers in south-west London. By 1995 he was a full-time sports presenter for Cable 17 Sport and turned freelance in May the following year, working on the sports desk for ITV Carlton's London Tonight with newsreaders Alastair Stewart and Mary Nightingale.

=== MLB on Five ===
He started presenting Channel Five's coverage of live Major League Baseball shortly after it (and the channel) were launched in 1997, taking over from original presenter Tommy Boyd on MLB on Five. When the soap Family Affairs ended, MLB on Five became the longest surviving programme on the five schedule.

Gould is a passionate fan of the Atlanta Braves and would defend them on the show with regular calls of "G'won the Braves" when they won; his favourite player is Chipper Jones. MLB coverage had been the jewel in the crown of Five's late night schedule, and led to the station also securing late-night NFL, NHL and NBA coverage.

Gould's approach to the sport was that of passionate supporter, constantly learning from and bouncing opinions off his co-presenters on the Five TV show. These included Todd Macklin, Josh Chetwynd, David Lengel and Mike Carlson, the channel's regular NFL analyst. He made liberal use of catchphrases, such as "Greetings fellow baseball nuts!" and "It's the last chance saloon!".

Gould is a fan of Chelsea F.C. and rarely missed an opportunity to use them as an analogy in his baseball presenting. He also included a section on the show regarding fantasy baseball. His nickname on Five's baseball coverage was Gouldfish, which refers to his goldfish-like memory.

=== Other work ===
In 2004, he presented the game show Memory Bank, taking turns with Rachel Pierman. Since then he presented BrainTeaser, taking turns with Alex Lovell throughout 2005.

Although BrainTeaser aired at 12:30 pm and the baseball coverage ended in the early hours, an unanticipated clash occurred in October 2005 when Game 3 of the World Series between the Chicago White Sox and the Houston Astros went to 14 innings, causing the match to end at 7 am UK time, resulting in his missing the train to Bristol to record BrainTeaser.

Subsequently Gould was seen on satellite channels Monte Carlo Roulette and Sky Poker, as well as presenting the online Fantasy Football show for TelegraphTV's "Fantasy Football Friday".

5 live started broadcasting a Major League Baseball audio feed each Sunday night on 4 July 2010, with Jonathan Gould hosting the broadcast and Josh Chetwynd providing analysis between innings. The series returned in 2011 with an earlier timeslot of 6 pm – 10 p.m. every Sunday, but Gould was replaced by Nat Coombs.

== President's Club ==
In January 2018, while hosting a charity auction for the President's Club in London, he was quoted in the Financial Times as welcoming people to "the most un-PC event of the year". The event generated controversy after it was reported that women hired as waitresses for the evening were groped by male guests. Gould, for his part, maintained he had not witnessed any inappropriate behaviour at the event.
