= Josh Chetwynd =

British baseball player and journalist

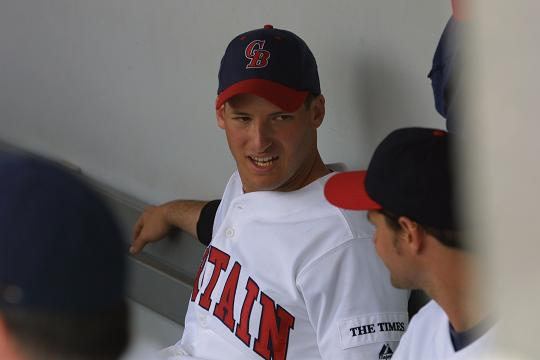
- Josh in the GB dugout
- Born: Joshua Stephen Chetwynd; September 11, 1971 (age 55); London, England
- Education: Northwestern University (BSJ, MSJ); University of Arizona (JD); London School of Economics and Political Science (LLM)
- Occupations: British baseball player and journalist
- Baseball career
- Catcher
- Bats: Right Throws: Right

Joshua Stephen Chetwynd (born September 11, 1971) is a British-born American journalist, broadcaster, author, sports agent and former baseball player. He has also competed in the sport of curling.

== Journalism ==
Chetwynd has worked as a staff reporter for USA Today, The Hollywood Reporter and U.S. News & World Report. His writing has also appeared in such publications/websites as The Wall Street Journal, The Times (of London), Chicago Tribune, MLB.com, Harvard Negotiation Law Review, The Observer Sport Monthly, and Variety. He was a two-time winner of the Los Angeles Press Club Award for best newspaper article written by a correspondent (1999 and 2000). In 2022, Chetwynd received a SABR Baseball Research Award for an article he wrote in Nine: A Journal of Baseball History and Culture.

== Broadcasting ==
Between 2002 and 2008, Chetwynd served as a baseball analyst for the British television network Five, primarily alongside presenter Jonny Gould on MLB on Five. He joined the show at the beginning of the 2002 season and worked as the co-host until the middle of the 2003 campaign when he returned to the United States. While in the U.S. he did on-camera interviews and reports for the show at both the World Series (2003–2005) and Spring Training in Arizona (2004–2005). At the start of the 2006 season, he resumed the co-host position full-time and held that post until the show was cancelled after the 2008 season. In October 2006, Chetwynd also took over hosting duties on Five's Monday night coverage of the NFL for a season, replacing Colin Murray. In addition, Chetwynd did voice over work for sports packages on Five's sister digital station Five US between 2006 and 2008.

On 4 July 2010, he began co-hosting MLB on 5 Live with Jonny Gould on BBC Radio 5 Live Sports Extra. In 2011, the show was picked up for second season with Nat Coombs replacing Gould as Chetwynd's regular co-host. Third and fourth seasons featured Coombs and Chetwynd in 2012 and 2013. During the 2013 post season, Chetwynd served as the program's primary host, anchoring the BBC's World Series studio show with former Major League pitcher Jason Hirsh filling the analyst's role.

As part of the coverage, Chetwynd has also done live color-commentary, on-site at the World Series with Simon Brotherton providing play-by-play in 2011 and 2012. Chetwynd previously collaborated with Brotherton in the same role for the BBC between 2003 and 2005. In 2012, the pair also broadcast MLB's Opening Series between the Oakland A's and Seattle Mariners in Tokyo, Japan. In September of that year, Chetwynd was the on-air analyst for television broadcasts of the World Baseball Classic - Qualifier 2 in Regensberg, Germany. Telecasts aired on the MLB Network and MLB.com in the U.S., Sportsnet in Canada and ESPN America in Europe. In 2019, Chetwynd provided commentary on BT Sport's coverage of the 2019 MLB London Series. He reprised that role at the 2023 MLB London Series and the 2024 MLB London Series.

== Books ==
Chetwynd has written a number of books.

"Be the Stone: A Collection of Curling Aphorisms and Insights" was released in November 2026. The pocket-sized gift book features aphorisms and insights broken down by subject on the sport of curling along with an illustrated curling flip book. Olympic curling gold medalist John Shuster wrote the foreword.

"The Exemplar" came out in July 2025. This science-fiction book was Chetwynd's debut novel. It touches on issues of identity, family and climate change. “The Exemplar” was awarded an “Our Verdict: Get It” designation from Kirkus Reviews.

A second edition to his "Baseball in Europe: A Country by Country History (2nd ed.)" came out in October 2019. More than a decade after the original was written, this volume features approximately 80 new interviews and 70 new photos and images, updating the histories of baseball in more than 40 European countries.

"Totally Scripted: Idioms, Words, And Quotes From Hollywood To Broadway That Have Changed The English Language" was released in February 2017.

"The Field Guide to Sports Metaphors: A Compendium of Competitive Words and Idioms" came out in May 2016. It looks at how sports have changed the English language through words and idioms. When the volume was released, Mental Floss named it one of "25 Amazing New Books for Spring."

"The Book of Nice: A Nice Book About Nice Things For Nice People" was released in April 2013. It delves into the origins and history of all things nice from gestures, sayings and songs to icons, offerings and characters.

"How the Hot Dog Found its Bun: Accidental Discoveries and Unexpected Inspiration That Shape What We Eat and Drink" came out in May 2012. It examines how luck has shaped so many of our favorite foods and drinks as well as kitchen innovations and inventions. In May 2015, the book reached number 13 on The New York Times Best Seller List in the ebook/non-fiction category.

"The Secret History of Balls: The Stories Behind the Things We Love to Catch, Whack, Throw, Kick, Bounce and Bat" was released in May 2011. NPR named it one of the "Best Books of 2011," calling Chetwynd "a great storyteller."

Chetwynd's book "Baseball in Europe: A Country by Country History" came out in 2008.

He also co-wrote the 2007 book "British Baseball and the West Ham Club: History of a 1930s Professional Team in East London". It was written with Brian A. Belton.

In addition, he has contributed chapters or essays to five other books: "Musial", "Baseball Beyond Our Borders: An International Pastime", "Baseball Without Borders: The International Pastime", "West Ham United Miscellany" and "Nine Aces and a Joker".

== Baseball career ==
Chetwynd's baseball career included stints at the NCAA Division I college level, professional baseball in the United States and Europe and international play for the Great Britain national baseball team. He competed for four years at Northwestern University in the Big Ten conference. He was named to Academic All Big Ten teams twice as a catcher. Following graduation in 1993, he signed a professional contract with the Zanesville Greys in the independent Frontier League. The team won the first-ever Frontier League championship that year, but Chetwynd was released midway through the season.

Although he grew up in Los Angeles, Chetwynd was born in London, England. Beginning in 1996, he had a 10-year career as a member of the Great Britain national squad. He would represent GB in five European Championships (1996, 1999, 2001, 2003, 2005). His best performances came in 1996 and 2001. At the 1996 European (B-Pool) Championships he hit .412 with a .706 slugging percentage. The team won the gold medal at that event to earn elevation into the top tier of European baseball. At the top level in 2001 he hit .353 at the championships held in Germany.

In 2003, Chetwynd played a season as a professional in Sweden's Elitserien, helping Oskarshamn to a share of the regular season title. He finished his career playing in Great Britain's top league. As a player-coach, he led the London Mets to two national championships (2007, 2008). In 2009, his final season, he won a third championship as a member of the Bracknell Blazers. In the finals that year, he went 5-for-5 with 4 RBI. Overall, he hit .440 over six seasons in Great Britain's highest domestic league.

In 2014, he was inducted into the British Baseball Hall of Fame.

== Sports Agent ==
Chetwynd negotiated the largest international amateur free agent contract for a European player, a $1.3 million deal with the Kansas City Royals for Italy's Marten Gasparini. Chetwynd also served as an agent for Gift Ngoepe, who became the first-ever African player to reach the Major Leagues.

== Curling ==
Chetwynd began playing the sport of curling recreationally in 2014. In 2016, he transitioned into competitive curling, joining Team Sobering. That year, the rink competed in the USA Men's Challenge Round in the hopes of earning a spot at the U.S. National Championships. After losing their first two games at the competition, the team ran off five straight victories to qualify. In doing so, the rink became the first Colorado-based team to reach the event in two decades. At the 2017 United States Men's Curling Championship, Team Sobering placed ninth. Chetwynd played lead for the team.

During the 2022–2023 season, Chetwynd's team made two semifinals and two quarterfinals on the World Curling Tour. Those results led to the rink securing a spot at the 2023 United States Men's Curling Championships. Chetwynd played lead on the team, which finished in seventh place at the event.

Chetwynd has also won two silver medals at the USA Curling Club National Championships—one in 2022 and another in 2024—and a bronze medal at the USA Curling Mixed Fours Championships in 2024.

== Education ==
Chetwynd holds two degrees in journalism from Northwestern: a BSJ (1993) and an MSJ (1994). He graduated with a JD from the University of Arizona in 2006 and completed an LLM from The London School of Economics and Political Science in 2009.

For his work at the LSE, he received the 2009 Brian Keelan Memorial Prize for excellence in the study of dispute resolution in a commercial context.
