= Major League Baseball =

North American professional baseball league

- Most recent season or competition: 2026 Major League Baseball season
- Sport: Baseball
- Founded: National League (NL): 1876; American League (AL): 1900; AL declares itself major: 1901; National Agreement: 1903; AL and NL merged: 2000
- Commissioner: Rob Manfred
- No. of teams: 30
- Countries: United States (29 teams); Canada (1 team)
- Headquarters: New York City, U.S.
- Confederation: WBSC Americas
- Most recent champions: Milwaukee Brewers (1st title)
- Most titles: New York Yankees (27 titles)
- Broadcasters: List: * Broadcasters: United States: Fox/FS1/Fox Deportes; TBS/TruTV/TUDN; NBC/NBCSN/Telemundo Deportes; ESPN/ESPN Deportes/ABC; MLB Network; ESPN Radio; TUDN Radio; Canada: Sportsnet/TVA Sports; MLB Network; International: See list; * Streaming Partners: United States: Fox One; HBO Max/Vix; Peacock; ESPN app; Apple TV; Netflix; Canada: Sportsnet+; Apple TV; Netflix; International: Apple TV; Netflix
- Website: www.mlb.com

Major League Baseball (MLB) is a professional baseball league in North America composed of 30 teams, divided equally between the National League (NL) and the American League (AL), with 29 in the United States and 1 in Canada. MLB is the oldest major professional sports league in the United States and Canada and is considered the premier baseball league in the world. Each team plays 162 games per season, with Opening Day held during the last week of March or the first week of April. Six teams in each league then advance to a four-round postseason tournament in October, culminating in the World Series, a best-of-seven championship series between the two league champions first played in 1903. MLB is headquartered in New York City.

Formed in 1876 and 1900, respectively, the NL and AL came into direct conflict in 1901 when the AL declared itself a competitor to the NL, with neither honoring the other's contracts and players often jumping from one league to the other. These practices were ended by the National Agreement of 1903, in which the AL and NL agreed to respect each other's player contracts, including the contentious reserve clause which bound players to their teams. The two leagues remained legally separate entities until 2000, when they merged into a single organization led by the commissioner of baseball.

The period from about 1900 to 1920 was the dead-ball era, when home runs were rarely hit. Professional baseball was rocked by the Black Sox Scandal, a conspiracy to fix the 1919 World Series. Baseball survived the scandal, albeit with major changes in its governance, as the relatively weak National Commission was replaced with a powerful commissioner of baseball with near-unlimited authority over the sport. MLB rose in popularity in the decade following the Black Sox Scandal, and unlike major leagues in other sports, it endured the Great Depression and World War II without any of its teams folding. Shortly after the war, Jackie Robinson broke baseball's color barrier.

Some teams moved to different cities in the 1950s and 1960s. The AL and NL added eight clubs in the 1960s, which started the expansion era: two in 1961, two in 1962, and four in 1969. Player discontent with established labor practices, especially the reserve clause, led to the organization of the Major League Baseball Players Association to collectively bargain with the owners, which in turn led to the introduction of free agency in baseball. Modern stadiums with artificial turf surfaces began to change the game in the 1970s and 1980s. Home runs began to dominate the game during the 1990s. In the mid-2000s, media reports disclosed the use of anabolic steroids among MLB players; a 2006–07 investigation produced the Mitchell Report, which found that many players had used steroids and other performance-enhancing substances, including at least one player from each team.

MLB became the third-wealthiest professional sports league in the world by revenue after the National Football League (NFL), first, and the National Basketball Association (NBA), which surpassed MLB and became number two in 2026. Baseball games are broadcast on television, radio, and the internet throughout North America and in several other countries. MLB has the highest total season attendance of any sports league in the world; in 2025, it drew 71.4 million spectators. MLB also oversees Minor League Baseball, which comprises lower-tier teams affiliated with the major league clubs, the MLB Draft League, a hybrid amateur-professional showcase league, and the Arizona Fall League, an off-season showcase league for minor league players. MLB and the World Baseball Softball Confederation jointly manage the international World Baseball Classic tournament.

The New York Yankees have the most World Series championships with 27. The reigning champions are the Milwaukee Brewers, who defeated the Tampa Bay Rays in the 2026 World Series.

== History ==
=== Founding ===
In the 1860s, aided by Civil War soldiers playing the game in camp, "New York"-style baseball expanded into a national game and spawned baseball's first governing body, the National Association of Base Ball Players (NABBP). The NABBP existed as an amateur league for 12 years. By 1867, more than 400 clubs were members. Most of the strongest clubs remained those based in the northeastern United States. Beginning in 1869, the NABBP began allowing players to be paid, and that same year, the Cincinnati Red Stockings became the first all-professional club.

A schism developed between professional and amateur ballplayers after the founding of the Cincinnati club. The NABBP split into an amateur organization and a professional organization. The National Association of Professional Base Ball Players, often known as the National Association (NA), was formed in 1871. Its amateur counterpart disappeared after only a few years. The modern Chicago Cubs and Atlanta Braves franchises trace their histories back to the National Association of Professional Base Ball Players in the 1870s.

In 1876, the National League of Professional Base Ball Clubs (later known as the National League or NL) was established after the NA proved ineffective. The league placed its emphasis on clubs rather than on players. Clubs could now enforce player contracts, preventing players from jumping to higher-paying clubs. Clubs were required to play the full schedule of games instead of forfeiting scheduled games when the club was no longer in the running for the league championship, which happened frequently under the NA. A concerted effort was made to curb gambling on games, which was leaving the validity of results in doubt. The first game in the NL—on Saturday, April 22, 1876 (at Jefferson Street Grounds in Philadelphia)—is often pointed to as the beginning of MLB.

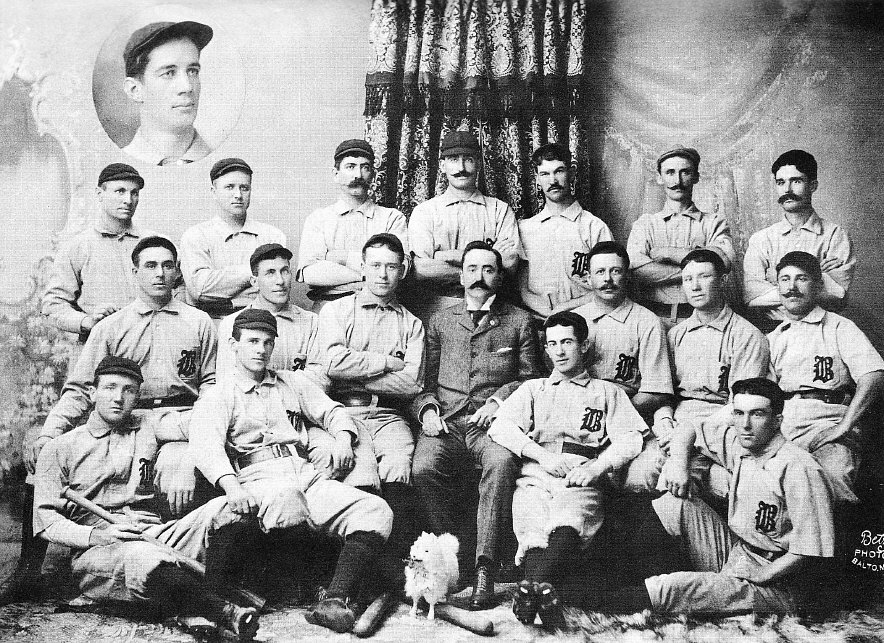
National League Baltimore Orioles, 1896

The early years of the NL were tumultuous, with threats from rival leagues and a rebellion by players against the hated "reserve clause", which restricted the free movement of players between clubs. Teams came and went; 1882 was the first season where the league's membership was the same as the preceding season's, and only four franchises survived to see 1900. Competitor leagues formed regularly and also disbanded regularly. The most successful was the American Association, sometimes called the "beer and whiskey league" for its tolerance of the sale of alcoholic beverages to spectators. For several years, the NL and American Association champions met in a postseason championship series—the first attempt at a World Series. The two leagues merged in 1892 as a single 12-team NL, but the NL dropped four teams after the 1899 season. This led to a minor league, the Western League under president Ban Johnson, renaming itself to the American League (AL) for the 1900 season and declaring itself a major league for the 1901 season. The resulting bidding war for players led to widespread contract-breaking and legal disputes.

The war between the AL and NL sent shockwaves throughout the baseball world. At a meeting at the Leland Hotel in Chicago in 1901, the other baseball leagues negotiated a plan to maintain their independence. A new organization, the National Association of Professional Baseball Leagues (NAPBL), was formed to oversee these minor leagues. After 1902, the NL, AL, and NAPBL signed a new National Agreement, which tied independent contracts to the reserve-clause contracts. The agreement also set up a formal classification system for minor leagues, the forerunner of today's system that was refined by Branch Rickey.

==== Other recognized leagues ====
Several other early defunct baseball leagues are considered major leagues, and their statistics and records are included with those of the two modern major leagues. In 1969, the Special Baseball Records Committee of Major League Baseball officially recognized six major leagues: the National League, American League, American Association, Union Association (1884), Players' League (1890), and Federal League (1914–1915). The status of the National Association as a major league has been a point of dispute among baseball researchers; while its statistics are not recognized by Major League Baseball, its statistics are included with those of other major leagues by some baseball reference websites, such as Retrosheet. Some researchers, including Nate Silver, dispute the major-league status of the Union Association by pointing out that franchises came and went and that the St. Louis club was deliberately "stacked"; the St. Louis club was owned by the league's president and it was the only club that was close to major-league caliber.

In December 2020, Major League Baseball announced its recognition of seven leagues within Negro league baseball as major leagues: the first and second Negro National Leagues (1920–1931 and 1933–1948), the Eastern Colored League (1923–1928), the American Negro League (1929), the East–West League (1932), the Negro Southern League (1932), and the Negro American League (1937–1948). In 2021, Baseball Reference began to include statistics from those seven leagues into their major-league statistics. In May 2024, Major League Baseball announced that it was "absorbing the available Negro Leagues numbers into the official historical record."

=== Dead-ball era ===
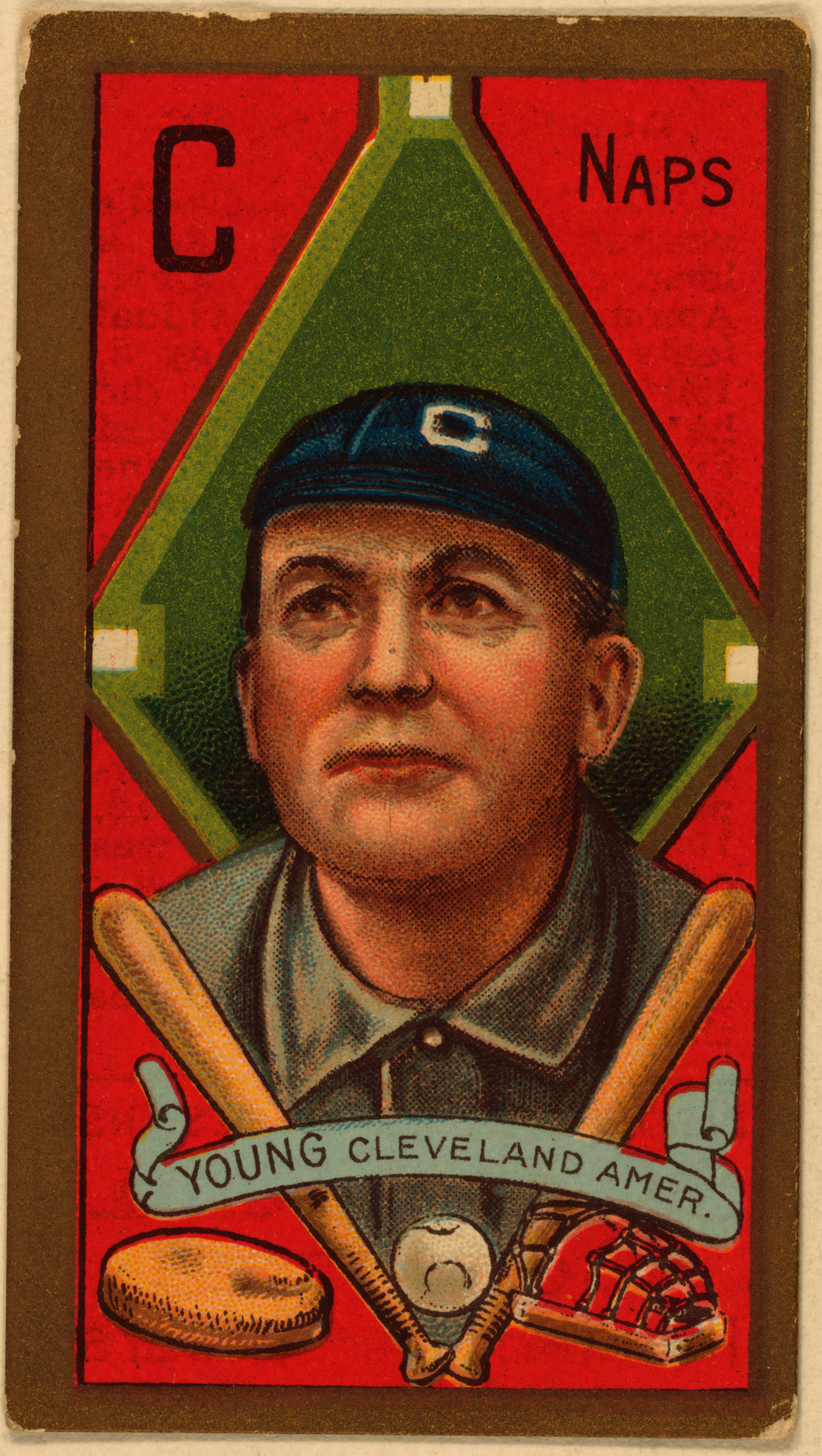
Cy Young, 1911 baseball card

The period between 1900 and 1919 is commonly referred to as the "dead-ball era". Games of this era tended to be low-scoring and were often dominated by pitchers, such as Walter Johnson, Cy Young, Christy Mathewson, Mordecai Brown, and Grover Cleveland Alexander. The term also accurately describes the condition of the baseball itself. The baseball used American rather than the modern Australian wool yarn and was not wound as tightly, affecting the distance that it would travel. More significantly, balls were kept in play until they were mangled, soft and sometimes lopsided. During this era, a baseball cost $3, (equivalent to $56 in 2025), and owners were reluctant to purchase new balls. Fans were expected to throw back fouls and (rare) home runs. Baseballs also became stained with tobacco juice, grass, and mud, and sometimes the juice of licorice, which some players would chew for the purpose of discoloring the ball.

Also, pitchers could manipulate the ball through the use of the spitball (In 1921, use of this pitch was restricted to a few pitchers with a grandfather clause). Additionally, many ballparks had large dimensions, such as the West Side Grounds of the Chicago Cubs, which was 560 feet (170 m) to the center field fence, and the Huntington Avenue Grounds of the Boston Red Sox, which was 635 feet (194 m) to the center field fence, thus home runs were rare, and "small ball" tactics such as singles, bunts, stolen bases, and the hit-and-run play dominated the strategies of the time. Hitting methods like the Baltimore chop were used to increase the number of infield singles. On a successful Baltimore chop, the batter hits the ball forcefully into the ground, causing it to bounce so high that the batter reaches first base before the ball can be fielded and thrown to the first baseman.

The adoption of the foul strike rule—in the NL in 1901, in the AL two years later—quickly sent baseball from a high-scoring game to one where scoring runs became a struggle. Before this rule, foul balls were not counted as strikes: a batter could foul off any number of pitches with no strikes counted against him; this gave an enormous advantage to the batter.

After the 1919 World Series between the Chicago White Sox and Cincinnati Reds, baseball was rocked by allegations of a game-fixing scheme known as the Black Sox Scandal. Eight players—Shoeless Joe Jackson, Eddie Cicotte, Lefty Williams, Buck Weaver, Chick Gandil, Fred McMullin, Swede Risberg, and Happy Felsch—intentionally lost the World Series in exchange for a ring worth $100,000 (equivalent to $1,860,000 in 2025). Despite being acquitted, all were permanently banned from professional baseball.

=== Rise in popularity ===
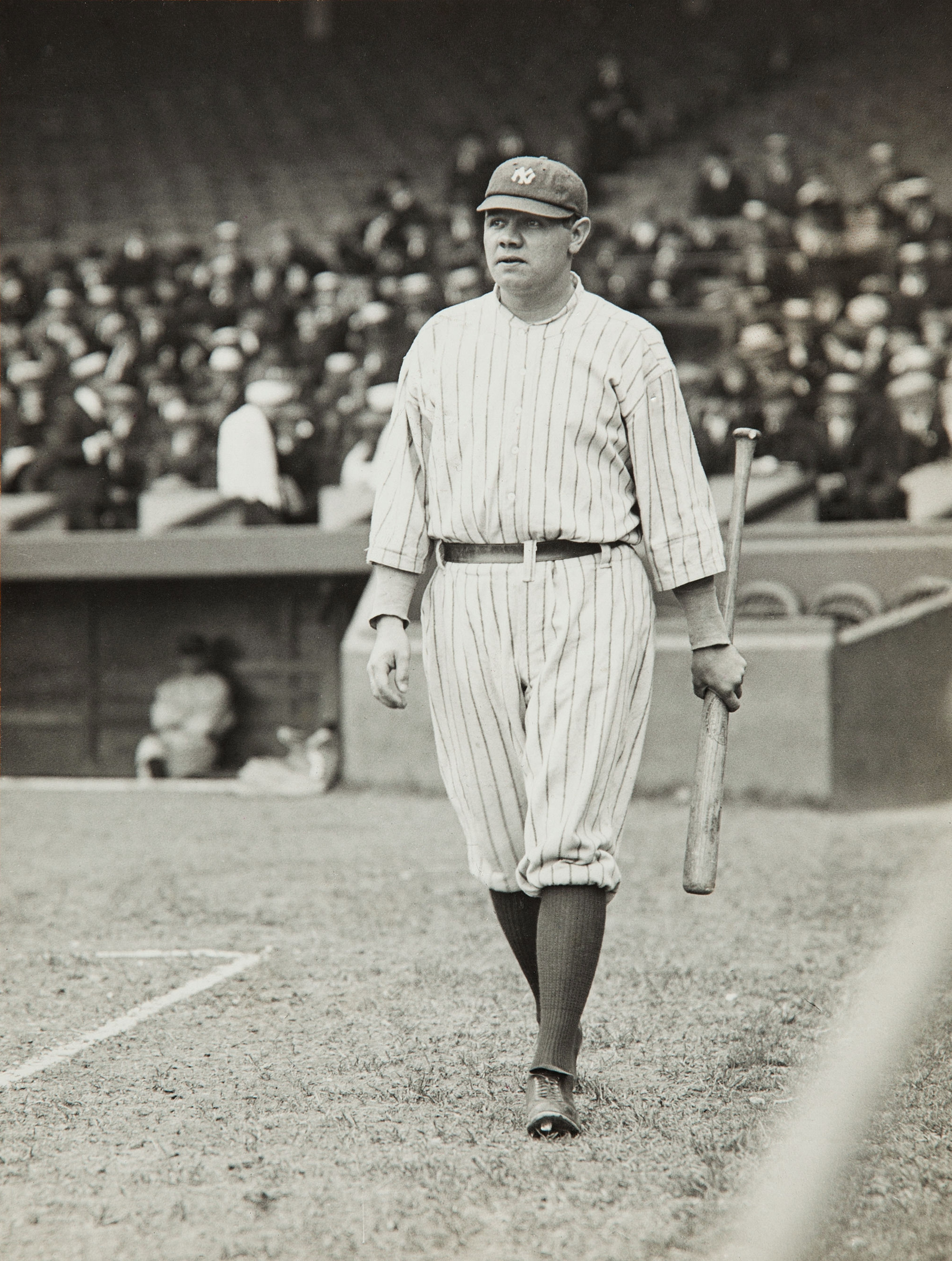
Babe Ruth, often considered the greatest baseball player of all time, in 1920

Baseball's popularity increased in the 1920s and 1930s. The 1920 season was notable for the death of Ray Chapman of the Cleveland Indians. Chapman, who was struck in the head by a pitch and died a few hours later, became the only MLB player to die of an on-field injury. Both leagues quickly began to require the use of new, white baseballs whenever a ball became scuffed or dirty, helping bring the "dead-ball" era to an end.

The following year, the New York Yankees made their first World Series appearance. By the end of the 1930s, the team had appeared in 11 World Series, winning eight of them. Yankees slugger Babe Ruth had set the single-season home run record in 1927, hitting 60 home runs; just eight years earlier, he had broken the previous record by hitting 29 home runs.

Impacted negatively by the Great Depression, baseball's popularity had begun a downward turn in the early 1930s. By 1932, only two MLB teams turned a profit. Attendance had fallen, due at least in part to a 10% federal amusement tax added to baseball ticket prices. Baseball owners cut their rosters from 25 men to 23, and even the best players took pay cuts. Team executives were innovative in their attempts to survive, creating night games, broadcasting games live by radio, and rolling out promotions such as free admission for women. Throughout the Great Depression, no MLB teams moved or folded.

=== World War II era ===
The onset of World War II created a shortage of professional baseball players, as more than 500 men left MLB teams to serve in the military. Many of them played on service baseball teams that entertained military personnel in the US or in the Pacific. MLB teams of this time largely consisted of young men, older players, and those with a military classification of 4F, indicating mental, physical, or moral unsuitability for service. Men like Pete Gray, a one-armed outfielder, got the chance to advance to the major leagues. However, MLB rosters did not include any black players through the end of the war. Black players, many of whom served in the war, were still restricted to playing Negro league baseball.

Wartime blackout restrictions, designed to keep outdoor lighting at low levels, caused another problem for baseball. These rules limited traveling and night games to the point that the 1942 season was nearly canceled. On January 14, 1942, MLB commissioner Kenesaw Mountain Landis wrote to U.S. president Franklin D. Roosevelt, pleading for the continuation of baseball during the war. Roosevelt responded, "I honestly feel that it would be best for the country to keep baseball going. There will be fewer people unemployed and everybody will work longer hours and harder than ever before. And that means that they ought to have a chance for recreation and for taking their minds off their work even more than before."

With President Roosevelt's approval, spring training began in 1942 with few repercussions. The war interrupted the careers of stars including Stan Musial, Bob Feller, Ted Williams, and Joe DiMaggio, but baseball clubs continued to field their teams.

=== Breaking the color barrier ===
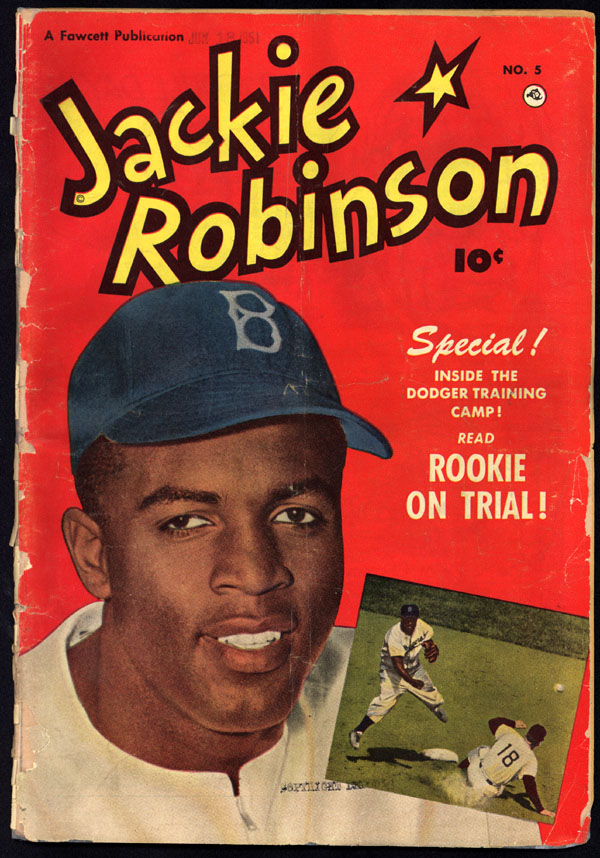
Jackie Robinson comic book, 1951

Branch Rickey, president and general manager of the Brooklyn Dodgers, began making efforts to introduce a black baseball player to the previously all-white professional baseball leagues in the mid-1940s. He selected Jackie Robinson from a list of promising Negro league players. After obtaining a commitment from Robinson to "turn the other cheek" to any racial antagonism directed at him, Rickey agreed to sign him to a contract for $600 a month (equivalent to $9,906 in 2025). In what was later referred to as "The Noble Experiment", Robinson was the first black baseball player in the International League since the 1880s, joining the Dodgers' farm club, the Montreal Royals, for the 1946 season.

The following year, the Dodgers called up Robinson to the major leagues. On April 15, 1947, Robinson made his major league debut at Ebbets Field before a crowd of 26,623 spectators, including more than 14,000 black patrons. Black baseball fans began flocking to see the Dodgers when they came to town, abandoning the Negro league teams that they had followed exclusively. Robinson's promotion met a generally positive, although mixed, reception among newspaper writers and white major league players. Manager Leo Durocher informed his team, "I don't care if he is yellow or black or has stripes like a fucking zebra. I'm his manager and I say he plays."

After a strike threat by some players, NL president Ford C. Frick and Commissioner Happy Chandler let it be known that any striking players would be suspended. Robinson received significant encouragement from several major-league players, including Dodgers teammate Pee Wee Reese who said, "You can hate a man for many reasons. Color is not one of them." That year, Robinson won the inaugural Major League Baseball Rookie of the Year Award (separate NL and AL Rookie of the Year honors were not awarded until 1949).

Less than three months later, Larry Doby became the first African-American to break the color barrier in the American League with the Cleveland Indians. The next year, a number of other black players entered the major leagues. Satchel Paige was signed by the Indians and the Dodgers added star catcher Roy Campanella and Don Newcombe, who was later the first winner of the Cy Young Award for his outstanding pitching.

=== Women in baseball ===
MLB banned the signing of women to contracts in 1952, but that ban was lifted in 1992. There have been no female MLB players since then.

=== Relocation and expansion ===
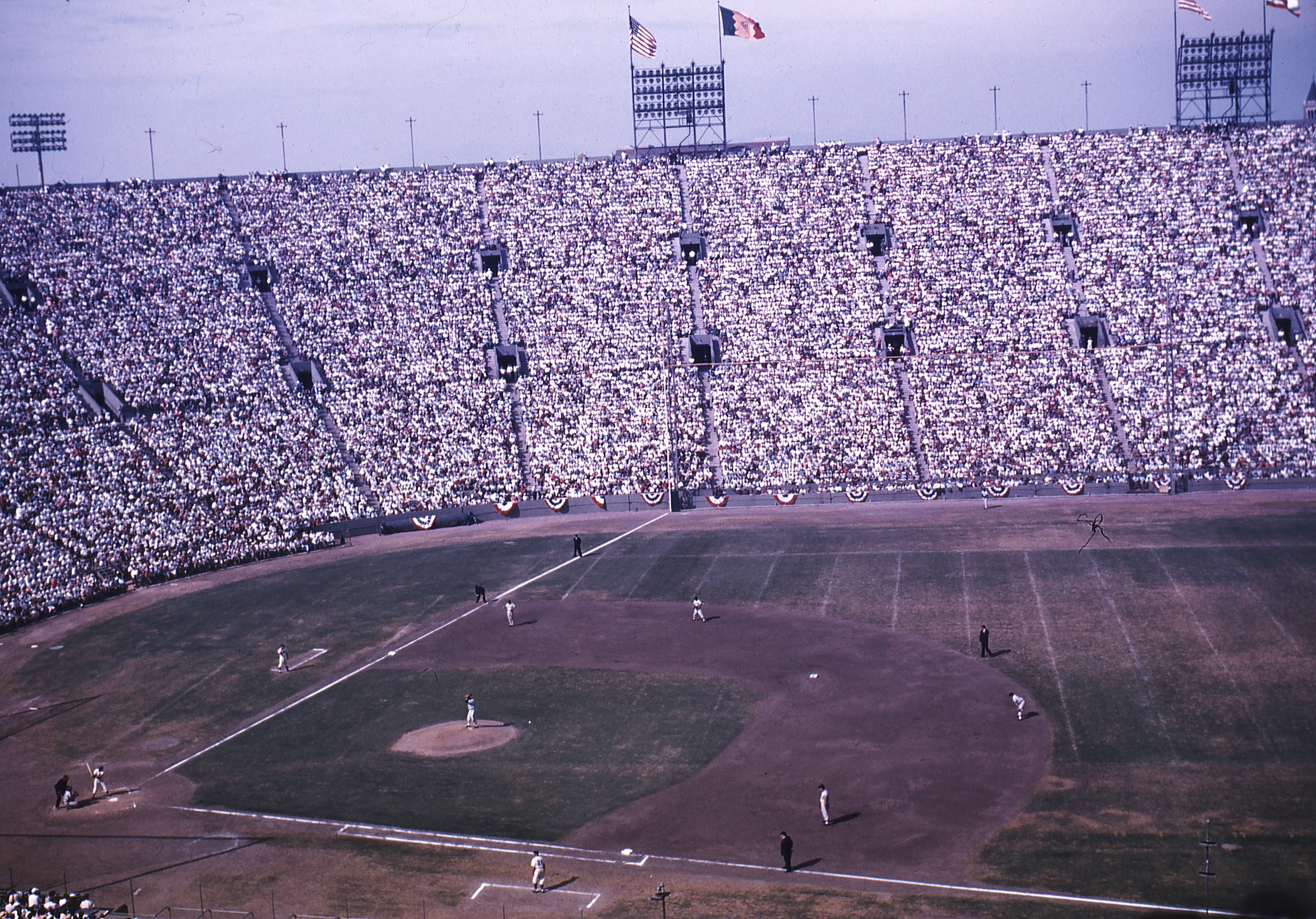
1959 World Series action at the Los Angeles Memorial Coliseum

From 1903 to 1952, the major leagues consisted of two eight-team leagues (Note: In this context, "major leagues" narrowly refers to the National League and American League; for other leagues considered major at various times, see discussion of other recognized leagues.) whose 16 teams were located in ten cities, all in the northeastern and mid-western United States: New York City had three teams and Boston, Chicago, Philadelphia, and St. Louis each had two teams. St. Louis was the southernmost and westernmost city with a major league team. The longest possible road trip, from Boston to St. Louis, took about 24 hours by railroad. After a half-century of stability, starting in the 1950s, teams began to move out of cities with multiple teams into cities that had not had them before. From 1953 to 1955, three teams moved to new cities: the Boston Braves became the Milwaukee Braves, the St. Louis Browns became the Baltimore Orioles, and the Philadelphia Athletics became the Kansas City Athletics.

The 1958 season began to turn Major League Baseball into a nationwide league. Walter O'Malley, owner of the Brooklyn Dodgers and "perhaps the most influential owner of baseball's early expansion era", moved his team to Los Angeles, marking the first major league franchise on the West Coast. O'Malley also helped persuade the rival New York Giants to move west to become the San Francisco Giants. Giants owner Horace Stoneham had been contemplating a move to Minnesota amid slumping attendance at the aging Polo Grounds ballpark when O'Malley invited him to meet San Francisco mayor George Christopher in New York. After Stoneham was persuaded to move to California, Time magazine put O'Malley on its cover. MLB commissioner Ford C. Frick had opposed the meeting, but the dual moves proved successful for both franchises and for MLB. Had the Dodgers moved out west alone, the St. Louis Cardinals—1,600 mi (2,575 km) away—would have been the closest NL team. Instead, the joint move made West Coast road trips economical for visiting teams. The Dodgers set a single-game MLB attendance record in their first home appearance with 78,672 fans.

In 1961, the first Washington Senators franchise moved to Minneapolis–Saint Paul to become the Minnesota Twins. Two new teams were added to the American League at the same time: the Los Angeles Angels (who soon moved from downtown L.A. to nearby Anaheim) and a new Washington Senators franchise. The NL added the Houston Astros and the New York Mets in 1962. The Astros (known as the "Colt .45s" during their first three seasons) became the first southern major league franchise since the Louisville Colonels folded in 1899 and the first franchise to be located along the Gulf Coast. The Mets established a reputation for futility by going 40–120 during their first season of play in the nation's media capital—and by playing only a little better in subsequent campaigns—but in their eighth season (1969) the Mets became the first of the 1960s expansion teams to play in the postseason, culminating in a World Series title over the heavily favored Baltimore Orioles.

In 1966, the major leagues moved to the "Deep South" when the Milwaukee Braves moved to Atlanta. In 1968, the Kansas City Athletics moved west to become the Oakland Athletics. In 1969, the American and National Leagues each added two expansion franchises. The American League added the Seattle Pilots (who became the Milwaukee Brewers after one disastrous season in Seattle) and the Kansas City Royals. The NL added the first Canadian franchise, the Montreal Expos, as well as the San Diego Padres.

In 1972, the second Washington Senators moved to the Dallas–Fort Worth metroplex to become the Texas Rangers. In 1977, baseball expanded again, adding a second Canadian team, the Toronto Blue Jays, as well as the Seattle Mariners. Subsequently, no new teams were added until 1993, and no teams moved until 2005.

=== Pitching dominance and rule changes ===
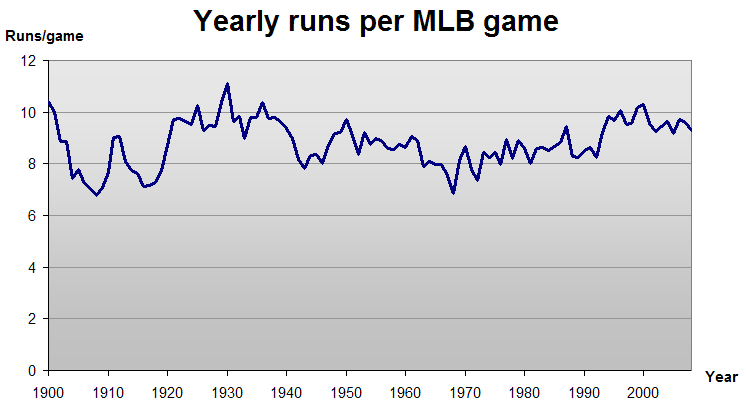
Graph showing, by year, the average number of runs per MLB game

By the late 1960s, the balance between pitching and hitting had swung in favor of the pitchers. In 1968—later nicknamed "the year of the pitcher"—Boston Red Sox player Carl Yastrzemski won the American League batting title with an average of just .301, the lowest in MLB history. Detroit Tigers pitcher Denny McLain won 31 games, making him the only pitcher to win 30 games in a season since Dizzy Dean in 1934. St. Louis Cardinals starting pitcher Bob Gibson achieved an equally remarkable feat by allowing an ERA of just 1.12.

Following these pitching performances, in December 1968 the MLB Playing Rules Committee voted to reduce the strike zone from knees to shoulders to top of knees to armpits and lower the pitcher's mound from 15 to 10 inches, beginning in the 1969 season.

In 1973, the American League, which had been suffering from much lower attendance than the National League, sought to increase scoring even further by initiating the designated hitter (DH) rule.

=== New stadiums and artificial surfaces ===
Throughout the 1960s and 1970s, as baseball expanded, the National Football League (NFL) had been surging in popularity, making it economical for many of these cities to build multi-purpose stadiums instead of single-purpose baseball fields. Because of climate and economic issues, many of these facilities had playing surfaces made from artificial turf, as well as the oval designs characteristic of stadiums designed to house both baseball and football. This often resulted in baseball fields with relatively more foul territory than older stadiums. These characteristics changed the nature of professional baseball, putting a higher premium on speed and defense over home-run hitting power since the fields were often too big for teams to expect to hit many home runs and foul balls hit in the air could more easily be caught for outs.

Teams began to be built around pitching—particularly their bullpens—and speed on the basepaths. Artificial surfaces meant balls traveled quicker and bounced higher, so it became easier to hit ground balls "in the hole" between the corner and middle infielders. Starting pitchers were no longer expected to throw complete games; it was enough for a starter to pitch 6–7 innings and turn the game over to the team's closer, a position which grew in importance over these decades. As stolen bases increased, home run totals dropped. After Willie Mays hit 52 home runs in 1965, only one player (George Foster) reached that mark until the 1990s.

=== Scandals and a changing game ===
During the 1980s, baseball experienced a number of significant changes the game had not seen in years. Home runs were on the decline throughout the decade, with players hitting 40 home runs just 13 times and no one hitting more than 50 home runs in a season for the first time since the dead-ball era (1900–1919).

The 1981 MLB strike from June 12 until July 31 forced the cancellation of 713 games and resulted in a split-season format.

In 1985, Pete Rose broke Ty Cobb's all-time hits record with his 4,192nd hit. In 1989, Rose received a lifetime ban from baseball as a result of betting on baseball games while manager of the Cincinnati Reds. Rose was the first person to receive a lifetime ban from baseball since 1943. 1985 also saw the Pittsburgh drug trials which involved players who were called to testify before a grand jury in Pittsburgh related to cocaine trafficking.

The 1994–95 MLB strike from August 12, 1994, to April 25, 1995, caused the cancellation of over 900 games and the forfeit of the entire 1994 postseason.

=== Steroid era, further expansion and near contraction ===
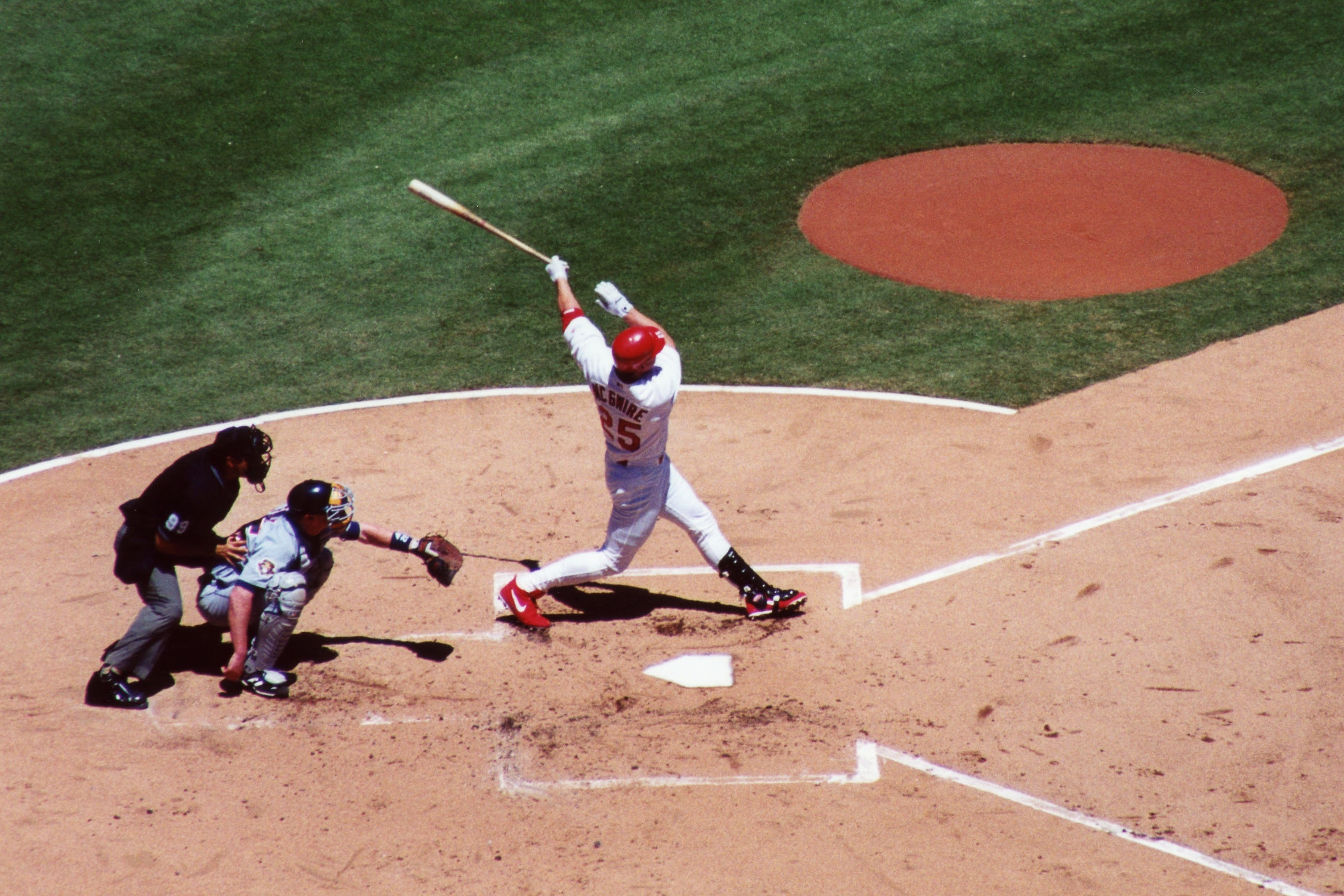
Mark McGwire (batter) was one of several central figures in baseball's steroids scandal.

Routinely in the late 1990s and early 2000s, baseball players hit 40 or 50 home runs in a season, a feat that was considered rare even in the 1980s. It later became apparent that at least some of this power surge was a result of players using steroids and other performance-enhancing drugs.

In 1993, the National League added the Florida Marlins in Miami and the Colorado Rockies in Denver. In 1998, the Brewers switched leagues by joining the National League, and two new teams were added: the National League's Arizona Diamondbacks in Phoenix and the American League's Tampa Bay Devil Rays in St. Petersburg, Florida.

After the 2001 season, the team owners voted in favor of contraction. Several MLB teams had been considered for elimination in early talks about contraction, but the Montreal Expos and the Minnesota Twins were the two teams that came closest to folding under the plan. Plans for MLB contraction were halted when the Twins landlord was awarded a court injunction that required the team to play its 2002 home games at their stadium. MLB owners agreed to hold off on reducing the league's size until at least 2006.

The Montreal Expos became the first franchise in over three decades to move when they became the Washington Nationals in 2005. This move left Canada with just one team, but it also returned baseball to Washington after a 33-year absence. This franchise shift, like many previous ones, involved baseball's return to a city that had been previously abandoned.

=== The modern game ===
In recent years, with the advent of technologies such as Statcast and its use of Hawk-Eye starting in 2020 as well as with advanced statistics as provided by sites such as FanGraphs and Baseball Savant, MLB has evolved. With the ability to see precise movements of pitchers and batters, teams can assess the mechanics of a player and help them improve. Statcast also provides some features such as tracking the paths of most batted balls, tracking the speed of most batted balls, and tracking the exit velocity of most batted balls. Statcast has allowed for advanced defensive analytics that have not been possible before tracking of players due to how subjective fielding can be.

The rate of teams using a defensive shift went up from 13.7% in 2016 to 33.6% in 2022 because advanced statistics supported this as an effective way to stop hitters from getting hits. Because the shift reduces the number of balls in play that result in hits and MLB wishes to increase interest in baseball, MLB announced in September 2022 that extreme infield defensive shifts would be banned starting in 2023. To be compliant, there must be two fielders on each side of second base, and those fielders must have both of their feet on the infield dirt at the time the pitch is thrown. If this rule is not followed, the choice of an automatic ball or the outcome of the play is given to the batting team.

The game of baseball has also slowed down significantly due to an increased number of strikeouts and walks—two outcomes that generally take many pitches to complete—and an increased amount of time taken for a pitcher to pitch. In 2020, it took an average of three hours and six minutes to complete a 9 inning game, a number which has steadily ticked up for years. Along with the restrictions on defensive shifts, MLB announced the introduction of a pitch clock for the 2023 season and beyond, which is something that has been an experiment in MiLB for a few years. The pitch clock starts at 15 seconds. By the time the clock reaches 10 seconds, the catcher must be in their crouch behind home plate. When the clock reaches 8 seconds, the batter must be in the batter's box and be "alert". Before the 15 second timer reaches 0 seconds, the pitcher must have started their "motion to pitch". If any of these deadlines are violated, the count of the batter will be increased by one ball if the defending team violated the pitch clock or one strike if it is the offensive team who violated the pitch clock. Additionally, in order to prevent circumventing these rules, pickoffs and step-offs—which reset the pitch clock—are only allowed two times total per plate appearance, and if a pitcher attempts a third pickoff and fails to get the runner out, a ball will be called. Similarly, a batter is restricted to calling a timeout (an action which resets the pitch clock) just once per plate appearance.

In 2019, MLB opened an investigation into allegations that members of the 2017 World Series champion Houston Astros stole signs from opposing teams using technology during the 2017 and 2018 seasons. The Astros were found guilty in January 2020 and while no active players faced any repercussions due to an immunity agreement in exchange for testimony, Astros general manager Jeff Luhnow and field manager A. J. Hinch were suspended for the entire 2020 season. The Astros were fined the maximum allowable $5 million and forfeited their first- and second-round picks in the 2020 and 2021 drafts. The Boston Red Sox were also found guilty of stealing signs during the 2017 and 2018 seasons, with the latter season ending in a World Series victory. Red Sox manager Alex Cora was suspended for a year and the team was fined with the loss of a second-round draft pick in the 2020 draft as a result.

=== 21st-century moves and potential expansion ===
In November 2023, the Oakland Athletics relocation to Las Vegas was approved by MLB owners. They are to play the 2025 through 2027 seasons in West Sacramento, California, while a new stadium is built in the Las Vegas metropolitan area, and will be referred to as simply the "Athletics" and "A's", with no city name attached.

MLB has discussed preparations for another round of expansion, and several investment groups are vying for a franchise. In 2025, commissioner Rob Manfred said MLB could add two teams and pursue a geographic realignment of its leagues and divisions.

== Teams ==
An asterisk (*) denotes a franchise move. See team articles for more information.

MLB teams
League	Division	Team	City	Stadium	Capacity	Coordinates	Founded	Joined
American League	East	Baltimore Orioles	Baltimore, Maryland	Oriole Park at Camden Yards	44,970	39°17′2″N 76°37′18″W	1901*	
American League	East	Boston Red Sox	Boston, Massachusetts	Fenway Park	37,555	42°20′47″N 71°5′51″W	1901	
American League	East	New York Yankees	New York, New York	Yankee Stadium	46,537	40°49′45″N 73°55′35″W	1903	
American League	East	Tampa Bay Rays	St. Petersburg, Florida	Tropicana Field	25,025	27°46′6″N 82°39′12″W	1998	
American League	East	Toronto Blue Jays	Toronto, Ontario	Rogers Centre	39,150	43°38′29″N 79°23′21″W	1977	
American League	Central	Chicago White Sox	Chicago, Illinois	Rate Field	40,615	41°49′48″N 87°38′2″W	1901	
American League	Central	Cleveland Guardians	Cleveland, Ohio	Progressive Field	34,830	41°29′45″N 81°41′7″W	1901	
American League	Central	Detroit Tigers	Detroit, Michigan	Comerica Park	41,083	42°20′21″N 83°2′55″W	1901	
American League	Central	Kansas City Royals	Kansas City, Missouri	Kauffman Stadium	37,903	39°3′5″N 94°28′50″W	1969	
American League	Central	Minnesota Twins	Minneapolis, Minnesota	Target Field	38,554	44°58′54″N 93°16′42″W	1901*	
American League	West	Athletics (Note: The Athletics plan to move to the Las Vegas metropolitan area when their new stadium is completed. The Athletics left Oakland Coliseum in Oakland, California, following the conclusion of the 2024 Major League Baseball season.)	West Sacramento, California	Sutter Health Park	14,014	38°34′49″N 121°30′50″W	1901*	
American League	West	Houston Astros	Houston, Texas	Daikin Park	41,168	29°45′25″N 95°21′20″W	1962 (NL)	2013 (AL)
American League	West	Los Angeles Angels	Anaheim, California	Angel Stadium	45,517	33°48′1″N 117°52′58″W	1961	
American League	West	Seattle Mariners	Seattle, Washington	T-Mobile Park	47,929	47°35′29″N 122°19′57″W	1977	
American League	West	Texas Rangers	Arlington, Texas	Globe Life Field	40,300	32°45′5″N 97°4′58″W	1961*	
National League	East	Atlanta Braves	Cumberland, Georgia	Truist Park	41,084	33°53′24″N 84°28′4″W	1871* (NA)	1876 (NL)
National League	East	Miami Marlins	Miami, Florida	LoanDepot Park	36,742	25°46′41″N 80°13′11″W	1993	
National League	East	New York Mets	New York, New York	Citi Field	41,922	40°45′25″N 73°50′45″W	1962	
National League	East	Philadelphia Phillies	Philadelphia, Pennsylvania	Citizens Bank Park	42,901	39°54′21″N 75°9′59″W	1883	
National League	East	Washington Nationals	Washington, D.C.	Nationals Park	41,373	38°52′22″N 77°0′27″W	1969*	
National League	Central	Chicago Cubs	Chicago, Illinois	Wrigley Field	41,649	41°56′54″N 87°39′20″W	1870 (NABBP)	1876 (NL)
National League	Central	Cincinnati Reds	Cincinnati, Ohio	Great American Ball Park	43,500	39°5′51″N 84°30′24″W	1882 (AA)	1890 (NL)
National League	Central	Milwaukee Brewers	Milwaukee, Wisconsin	American Family Field	41,700	43°1′42″N 87°58′16″W	1969* (AL)	1998 (NL)
National League	Central	Pittsburgh Pirates	Pittsburgh, Pennsylvania	PNC Park	38,747	40°26′49″N 80°0′21″W	1882 (AA)	1887 (NL)
National League	Central	St. Louis Cardinals	St. Louis, Missouri	Busch Stadium	44,383	38°37′21″N 90°11′35″W	1882 (AA)	1892 (NL)
National League	West	Arizona Diamondbacks	Phoenix, Arizona	Chase Field	48,330	33°26′43″N 112°4′1″W	1998	
National League	West	Colorado Rockies	Denver, Colorado	Coors Field	46,897	39°45′22″N 104°59′39″W	1993	
National League	West	Los Angeles Dodgers	Los Angeles, California	Dodger Stadium	56,000	34°4′25″N 118°14′24″W	1884* (AA)	1890 (NL)
National League	West	San Diego Padres	San Diego, California	Petco Park	39,860	32°42′26″N 117°9′24″W	1969	
National League	West	San Francisco Giants	San Francisco, California	Oracle Park	41,331	37°46′43″N 122°23′21″W	1883*	

== Organizational structure ==
MLB is governed by the Major League Baseball Constitution. This document has undergone several incarnations since its creation in 1876. Under the direction of the commissioner of baseball, MLB hires and maintains the sport's umpiring crews, and negotiates marketing, labor, and television contracts. MLB maintains a unique, controlling relationship over the sport, including most aspects of Minor League Baseball. This is due in large part to the 1922 U.S. Supreme Court ruling in Federal Baseball Club v. National League, which held that baseball is not interstate commerce and therefore not subject to federal antitrust law; MLB is the only league that has such a status, and has not faced any competition since this case. This ruling has been weakened only slightly in subsequent years. The weakened ruling granted more stability to the owners of teams and has resulted in values increasing at double-digit rates. There were several challenges to MLB's primacy in the sport, with notable attempts to establish competing leagues occurring during the late 1800s, from 1913 to 1915 with the short-lived Federal League, and in 1960 with the aborted Continental League.

The chief executive of MLB is the commissioner, Rob Manfred. The deputy commissioner of baseball administration and chief legal officer is Dan Halem. There are seven other executives: executive vice president and general counsel, chief operations and strategy officer, chief communications officer, chief financial officer and senior advisor, executive vice president and chief marketing officer, chief revenue officer, and chief baseball development officer.

The multimedia branch of MLB is MLB Advanced Media, which is based in New York City. This branch oversees MLB.com and each of the 30 teams' websites. Its charter states that MLB Advanced Media holds editorial independence from the league, but it is under the same ownership group and revenue-sharing plan. MLB Productions is a similarly structured wing of the league, focusing on video and traditional broadcast media. MLB also owns 67 percent of MLB Network, with the other 33 percent split between several cable operators and satellite provider DirecTV. It operates out of studios in Secaucus, New Jersey, and also has editorial independence from the league.

== League organization ==
In 1920, the weak National Commission, created to manage relationships between the two leagues, was replaced with the much more powerful commissioner of baseball, who had the power to make decisions for all of professional baseball unilaterally. From 1901 to 1960, the American League and National League fielded eight teams apiece.

In the 1960s, MLB expansion added eight teams (four to each league), including the first non-U.S. team (the Montreal Expos). Two teams (the Seattle Mariners and the Toronto Blue Jays) were also added to the American League in the 1970s. From 1969 through 1993, each league consisted of an East and West Division, and between 1977 and 1992, the leagues had a different number of teams (14 in the American League and 12 in the National League). In 1993, the National League expanded with two teams, the Florida Marlins (now known as the Miami Marlins) and the Colorado Rockies, to even up the number of teams in both leagues. A third division, the Central Division, was formed in each league in 1994. Until 1996, the two leagues met on the field only during the World Series and the All-Star Game. Regular-season interleague play was introduced in 1997.

In March 1995, two new franchises, the Arizona Diamondbacks and Tampa Bay Devil Rays (now known as the Tampa Bay Rays), were awarded by MLB, which began play in 1998. This addition brought the total number of franchises to 30. In early 1997, MLB decided to assign one new team to each league: Tampa Bay joined the AL and Arizona joined the NL. The original plan was to have an odd number of teams in each league (15 per league, with five in each division), but in order for every team to be able to play daily, this would have required interleague play to be scheduled throughout the entire season. However, it was unclear at the time if the interleague play would continue after the 1998 season, as it had to be approved by the players' union. For this and other reasons, it was decided that both leagues should continue to have an even number of teams, and therefore, one existing club would have to switch leagues. The Milwaukee Brewers agreed in November 1997 to move from the AL to the NL, thereby making the AL a 14-team league and the NL a 16-team league. At the same time, the Detroit Tigers agreed to move from the AL East to the AL Central (to replace Milwaukee), with the expansion Tampa Bay Devil Rays joining the AL East. Later, when the Houston Astros changed ownership prior to the 2013 season, the team moved from the NL Central to the AL West, resulting in both leagues having three divisions of five teams each and allowing all teams to have a more balanced schedule. Interleague play is now held throughout the season.

In 2000, the AL and NL were dissolved as legal entities, and MLB became a single, overall league de jure, similar to the National Football League (NFL), National Basketball Association (NBA) and National Hockey League (NHL)—albeit with two components called "leagues" instead of "conferences". The use of "major-league baseball" to refer to the overall AL–NL construct prior to 2000 is preferred, since statements such as "In 1942, Ted Williams led MLB with 36 homers, 137 RBIs, a .356 batting average, and won the first of his two Triple Crowns" are anachronistic.

Since becoming a single entity, common rules and regulations have been used in both MLB leagues, with one former exception: the AL continued operating under the designated hitter (DH) rule, while the NL did not. In 2020, the NL used the DH rule for the first time. As part of the settlement of the 2021–22 Major League Baseball lockout, this change was made permanent, thus making the rules in the two leagues identical.

== Uniforms ==
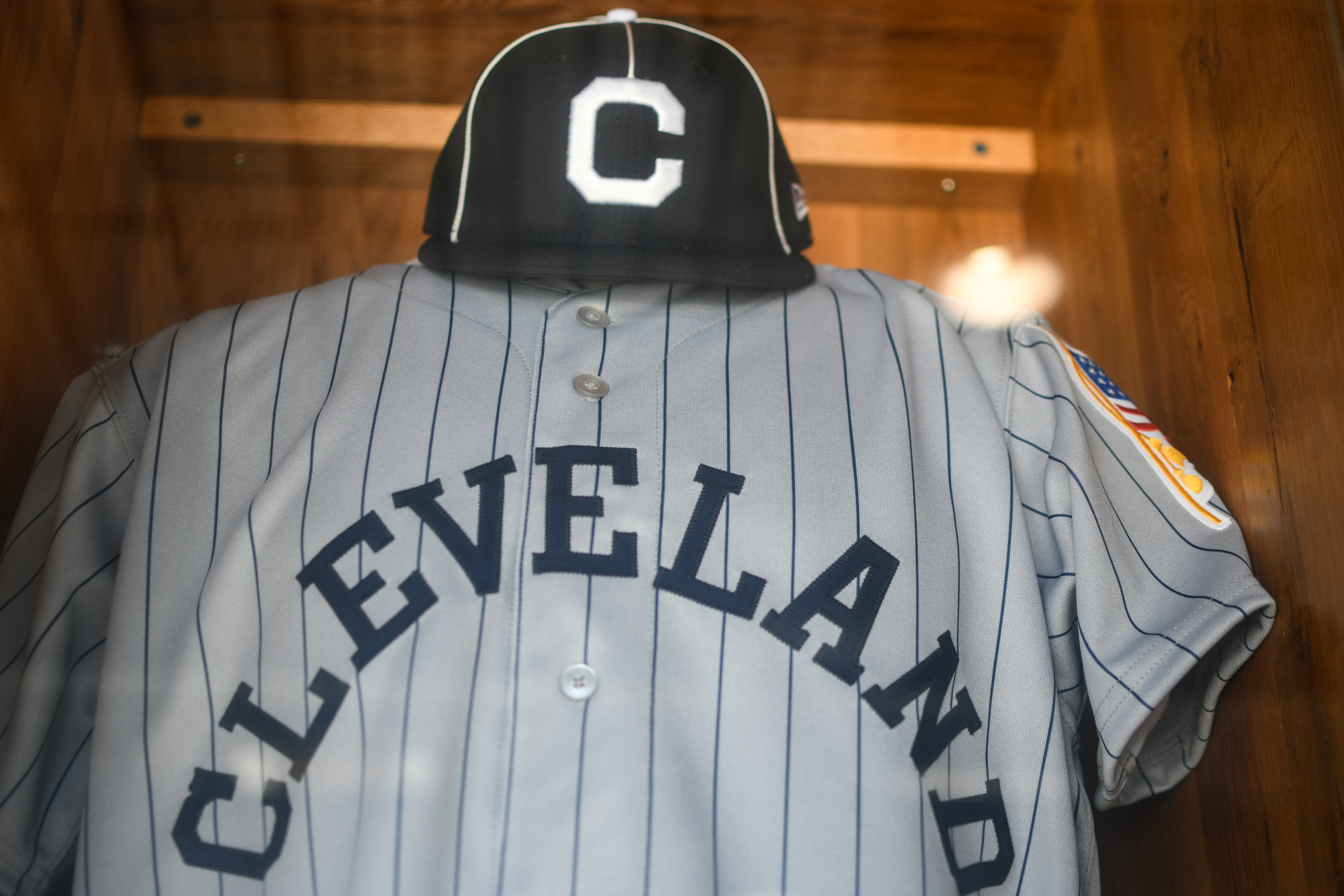
Cleveland Guardians throwback uniform

A baseball uniform is a type of uniform worn by baseball players and by some non-playing personnel, such as field managers and coaches. It is worn to indicate the person's role in the game and—through the use of logos, colors, and numbers—to identify the teams and their players, managers, and coaches.

Traditionally, home uniforms display the team name on the front, while away uniforms display the team's home location. In modern times, however, exceptions to this pattern have become common, with teams using their team name on both uniforms. Most teams also have one or more alternate uniforms, usually consisting of the primary or secondary team color on the vest instead of the usual white or gray. In the past few decades throwback uniforms have become popular.

The New York Knickerbockers were the first baseball team to use uniforms, taking the field on April 4, 1849, in pants made of blue wool, white flannel shirts (jerseys) and straw hats. Caps and other types of headgear have been a part of baseball uniforms from the beginning. Baseball teams often wore full-brimmed straw hats or no cap at all since there was no official rule regarding headgear. Under the 1882 uniform rules, players on the same team wore uniforms of different colors and patterns that indicated which position they played. This rule was soon abandoned as impractical.

In the late 1880s, Detroit and Washington of the National League and Brooklyn of the American Association were the first to wear striped uniforms. By the end of the 19th century, teams began the practice of having two different uniforms, one for when they played at home in their own baseball stadium and a different one for when they played away (on the road) at the other team's ballpark. It became common to wear white pants with a white color vest at home and gray pants with a gray or solid (dark) colored vest when away. By 1900, both home and away uniforms were standard across the major leagues.

In June 2021, MLB announced a long-term deal with cryptocurrency exchange FTX, which includes the FTX logo appearing on umpire uniforms during all games. FTX is MLB's first-ever umpire uniform patch partner. On November 11, 2022, FTX filed for Chapter 11 bankruptcy protection. MLB removed the FTX patches from umpires' uniforms before the 2023 season.

== Season structure ==
=== Spring training ===
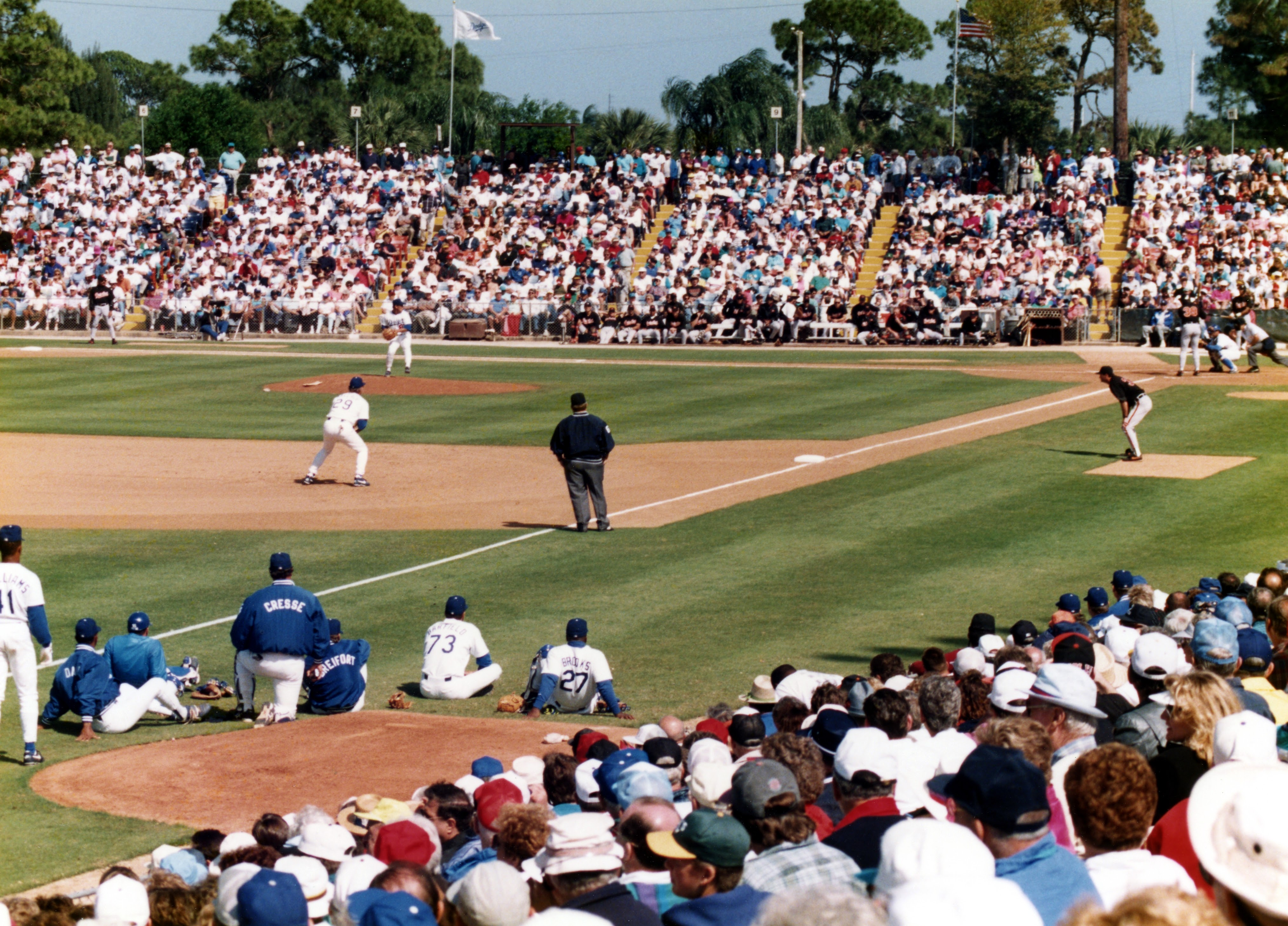
A Grapefruit League game at the former Los Angeles Dodgers camp in Vero Beach, Florida

Spring training is a series of practices and exhibition games preceding the start of the regular season. Teams hold training camps in the states of Arizona and Florida, where the early warm weather allows teams to practice and play without worrying about the late winter cold. Spring training allows new players to compete for roster and position spots and gives existing team players practice time prior to competitive play. The teams that hold spring training in Arizona are grouped into the Cactus League, while teams that hold camp in Florida are known as the Grapefruit League.

Spring training typically lasts almost two months, starting in mid-February and running until just before the season-opening day, traditionally the first week of April. As pitchers benefit from a longer training period, pitchers and catchers begin spring training several days before the rest of the team.

=== Regular season ===
Each team plays 162 games per season. A team's schedule is typically organized into three-game series, sets of consecutive games against the same opponent, with occasional two- or four-game series. Postponed games or continuations of suspended games can result in an ad hoc one-game or five-game series. All games of a series are usually hosted by the same team, and multiple series are typically grouped together. I.e, a team usually hosts several series in a row, called a homestand, and follows that by going on several road series in a row. Teams generally play games five to seven days per week. Most games are scheduled at night, although teams will often play day games on Opening Day, holidays, and for the last game of a series to allow teams extra time to travel to their next opponent. Sunday games are generally played during the afternoon, allowing teams to travel to their next destination prior to a Monday night game.

In the current three-division structure, each team plays 13 games against each of its four divisional opponents. It plays one home series and one away series, amounting to six or seven games, against the 10 other teams in its league. A team also plays 3-game series with all the other teams in the other league, alternating home teams each year. Furthermore, each team has an interleague "natural rival" (in some cases its counterpart in the same metro area) with which it plays three home games and three away games each year.

With an odd number of teams in each league (15), it is necessary to have two teams participate in interleague play for most days in the season, except when two or more teams have a day off. From 2013 to 2022, each team played 20 interleague games throughout the season, usually with just one interleague game per day, but for one weekend in late May, all teams would participate in an interleague series. Before 2013, interleague play was structured differently: there would be one weekend in mid-May and another period consisting typically of the last two-thirds of June in which all teams played interleague games (save for two NL teams each day), and no interleague games were scheduled outside those dates. (Season-long interleague play was not necessary before 2013 as each league had an even number of teams. In 2013, the Houston Astros moved to the American League, so that each league would have 15 teams.) Prior to the adoption of the universal designated hitter in 2022, whether the DH was in use depended on whether the home team was from the AL, where the DH was used, or the NL, where it was not.

Starting with the 2023 season, the scheduling formula changed, with each team playing at least one series against every other team every year. Each team plays 13 games against teams in the same division, with one 3-game and one 4-game series at each park, six or seven games against teams within the same league but in other divisions, with one 3-game (or 4-game series) at each park, and one 3-game series against teams in the other league, alternating home teams each year, except for each team's designated interleague rival, which will continue to consist of two 2-game (3-game since 2025) series at each of the teams' home parks.

Beginning with the 2022 season, teams compete for the six playoff berths in their respective leagues. To secure a berth, a team must either win its division or capture a wild card spot by having one of the three best records among the non-winners in its entire league. With the adoption of a third wild card, the former practice of breaking ties with an additional regular-season game, known as Game 163, was dropped in favor of a tie-breaker formula.

=== All-Star Game ===
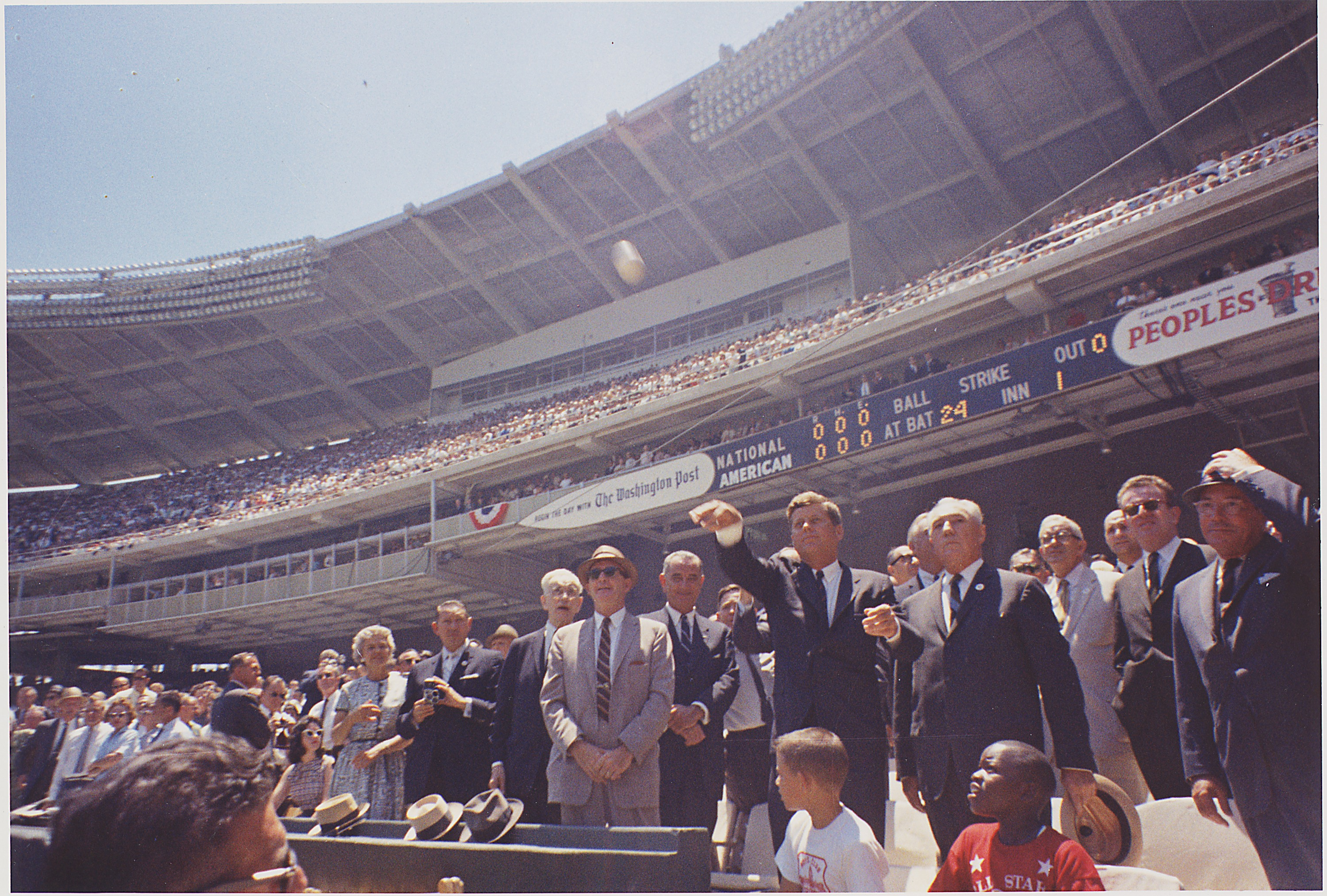
President John F. Kennedy throwing out the first pitch at the 1962 All-Star Game at DC Stadium

In early-to-mid July, just after the midway point of the season, the Major League Baseball All-Star Game is held during a four-day break from the regular-season schedule. The All-Star Game features a team of players from the American League (AL)—led by the manager of the previous AL World Series team—and a team of players from the National League (NL), similarly managed, in an exhibition game. From 1959 to 1962, two games were held each season, one was held in July and one was held in August. The designated-hitter rule was used in the All-Star Game for the first time in 1989. Following games used a DH when the game was played in an AL ballpark. Since 2010, the DH rule has been in effect regardless of venue.

The first official All-Star Game was held as part of the 1933 World's Fair in Chicago, Illinois, and was the idea of Arch Ward, then sports editor for The Chicago Tribune. Initially intended to be a one-time event, its great success resulted in making the game an annual one. Ward's contribution was recognized by Major League Baseball in 1962 with the creation of the "Arch Ward Trophy", given to the All-Star Game's Most Valuable Player each year. (In 1970, it was renamed the Commissioner's Trophy, until 1985, when the name change was reversed. In 2002, it was renamed the Ted Williams Most Valuable Player Award.)

Beginning in 1947, the eight position players in each team's starting lineup have been voted into the game by fans. The fan voting was discontinued after a 1957 ballot-box-stuffing scandal in Cincinnati: seven of the eight slots originally went to Reds players, two of whom were subsequently removed from the lineup to make room for Willie Mays and Hank Aaron. Fan voting was reinstated in 1970 and has continued ever since, including internet voting in recent years.

The 2002 contest in Milwaukee controversially ended in an 11-inning tie when both managers ran out of pitchers. In response, starting in 2003 the league which wins the All-Star game received home-field advantage in the World Series: the league champion hosted the first two games at its own ballpark as well as the last two (if necessary). The National League did not win an All-Star game and thus gain a home-field advantage until 2010; it was able to overcome this disadvantage and win in three of the seven World Series from 2003 to 2009. This was discontinued after the 2016 season.

MLB All-Stars from both leagues have worn uniforms from their respective teams at the game with one exception. In the 1933 All-Star Game, the National League All-Star Team members wore special gray uniforms with "National League" written in navy blue letters across the front of the jersey.

=== Postseason ===
World Series records
Team	Series won	Last Series won	Series played
New York Yankees (AL)	27	2009	41
St. Louis Cardinals (NL)	11	2011	19
Los Angeles Dodgers (NL)	9	2025	23
Athletics (AL)	9	1989	14
Boston Red Sox (AL)	9	2018	13
San Francisco Giants (NL)	8	2014	20
Cincinnati Reds (NL)	5	1990	9
Pittsburgh Pirates (NL)	5	1979	7
Detroit Tigers (AL)	4	1984	11
Atlanta Braves (NL)	4	2021	10
Chicago Cubs (NL)	3	2016	11
Baltimore Orioles (AL)	3	1983	7
Minnesota Twins (AL)	3	1991	6
Chicago White Sox (AL)	3	2005	5
Philadelphia Phillies (NL)	2	2008	8
Cleveland Guardians (AL)	2	1948	6
Houston Astros (NL to AL, 2013)	2 ^{[AL]}	2022	5 (4 ^{[AL]}, 1 ^{[NL]})
New York Mets (NL)	2	1986	5
Kansas City Royals (AL)	2	2015	4
Toronto Blue Jays (AL)	2	1993	3
Miami Marlins (NL)	2	2003	2
Texas Rangers (AL)	1	2023	3
Milwaukee Brewers (AL to NL, 1998)	1 ^{[NL]}	2026	2 (1 ^{[NL]}, 1 ^{[AL]})
Arizona Diamondbacks (NL)	1	2001	2
Washington Nationals (NL)	1	2019	1
Los Angeles Angels (AL)	1	2002	1
Tampa Bay Rays (AL)	0		3
San Diego Padres (NL)	0		2
Colorado Rockies (NL)	0		1
Seattle Mariners (AL)	0		0

The regular season ends after the first Sunday in October (or the last Sunday in September), after which twelve teams enter the postseason playoffs. These twelve teams consist of the six division champions and six "wild-card" teams: the team with the best overall win–loss record in each of the six divisions, and the three teams in each league with the best records other than the division champions. Four rounds of series of games are played to determine the champion:

1. Wild Card Series, a best of three games playoff between the lowest seeded division champion and three "wild-card teams", the higher seeds will host all three games
2. American League Division Series and National League Division Series, each a best-of-five-games series.
3. American League Championship Series and National League Championship Series, each a best-of-seven-games series played between the winning teams from the Division Series. The league champions are referred to as the pennant winners.
4. World Series, a best-of-seven-games series played between the pennant winners of each league.

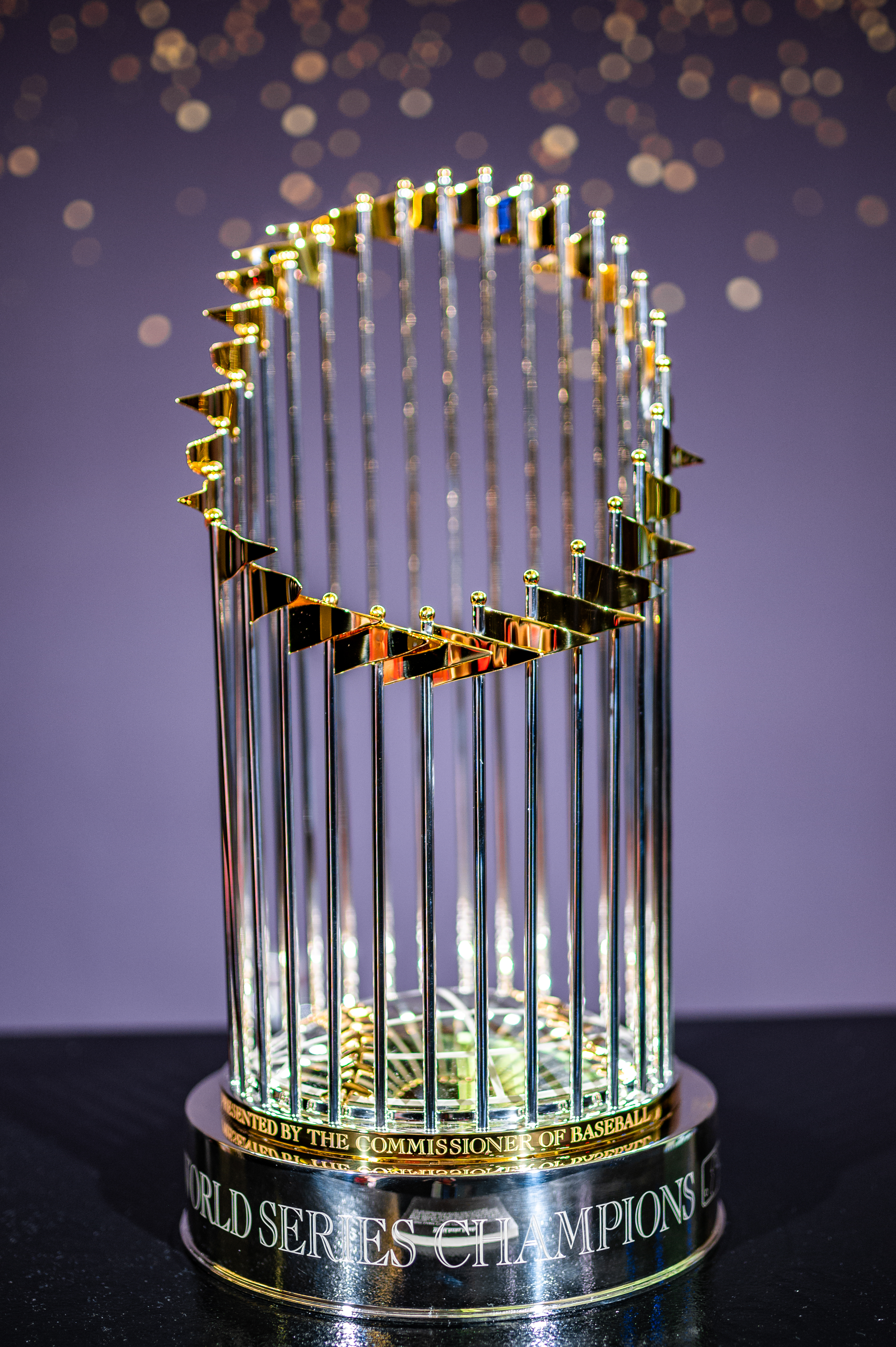
The Commissioner's Trophy is awarded annually to the winning team of the World Series, the league's championship series that concludes the postseason.

Within each league, the division winners are the 1, 2, and 3-seeds, based on win–loss records. The teams with the first, second, and third best records among non-division winners will be seeded 4, 5, and 6 respectively. Throughout the postseason, home-field advantage is awarded to the team with the higher win-loss record, with tiebreakers being applied if necessary. In the Wild Card Series, the 3-seed will host the 6-seed, and the 4-seed will host the 5-seed, with the winners advancing to the Division Series. Unlike the NFL, there is no reseeding between each series. In the Division Series, the 1-seed goes up against the 4/5-seed and the 2-seed goes up against the 3/6-seed. The winners of those matches will compete in their respective League Championship Series for their league pennant, and the pennant winners will advance to the World Series. Since 2017, home-field advantage in the World Series is determined by regular-season records of the two league champions, replacing a system used for the prior 14 seasons where the champion of the league that won the All-Star Game would receive home-field advantage.

The team with home-field advantage in the Wild Card Series will host all three games, and subsequent series' will split home fields between the two teams in a 2-2-1 format in the Division Series and a 2-3-2 format in the League Championship Series and World Series, with the advantaged team hosting games 1 and 2, as well as 6 and 7 (if necessary). With this format, the home-field advantage does not usually play a large role in the postseason unless the series goes to its maximum number of games. However, because the first two games of a postseason series are hosted by the same team, a team starting with two wins will likely have momentum heading into the venue switch.

== International play ==
From 1986 to 2018, an MLB All-Star team was sent to a biennial end-of-the-season tour of Japan, dubbed the MLB Japan All-Star Series, playing exhibition games in a best-of format against the All-Stars from Nippon Professional Baseball (NPB) or, in 2014 and 2018, their national team, Samurai Japan.

In 2008, MLB played the MLB China Series in the People's Republic of China. It was a series of two spring-training games between the San Diego Padres and Los Angeles Dodgers. The games were an effort to popularize baseball in China.

MLB played the MLB Taiwan All-Star Series in Taiwan in November 2011. It was a series of five exhibition games played by a team made up of MLB players called the MLB All-Stars and the Chinese Taipei national baseball team. The MLB All-Stars swept the series, five games to zero. At the end of the 2011 season, it was announced that the Seattle Mariners and the Oakland Athletics would play their season openers in Japan. In October 2013, Phil Rogers of the Chicago Tribune wrote that MLB was considering postseason all-star tours in Taiwan and Korea; baseball is increasing in popularity in both countries.

The Arizona Diamondbacks opened the 2014 season against Los Angeles Dodgers from March 22–23 in Australia. The teams played each other at the historic Sydney Cricket Ground, which has a seating capacity of 46,000. The two games represented the first MLB regular-season play held in that country. The games counted as home games for the Diamondbacks, so they played 79 home games at Chase Field.

In 2019, the Boston Red Sox were the home team in a regular-season two-game series against the New York Yankees. The games, which were the first regular-season MLB games held in Europe, were played on June 29–30 at London Stadium with the Yankees winning both games.

The San Diego Padres and Los Angeles Dodgers opened the 2024 regular season on March 20–21 at Gocheok Sky Dome in Seoul, South Korea. The ceremonial first pitch of the opening game was thrown by the first Korean-born MLB player Chan Ho Park, who made his debut with the LA Dodgers in 1994. The two-game Seoul Series resulted in a split between the two teams. There were also four exhibition games played during March 17–18, where the Dodgers took on the Kiwoom Heroes and Team Korea, and the Padres faced the LG Twins and Team Korea.

The 2025 season began with the Los Angeles Dodgers and the Chicago Cubs playing in Tokyo at the Tokyo Dome for the MLB Tokyo Series 2025.

Together with the World Baseball Softball Confederation, MLB sponsors the World Baseball Classic, an international baseball tournament contested by national teams.

== Performance-enhancing drugs ==
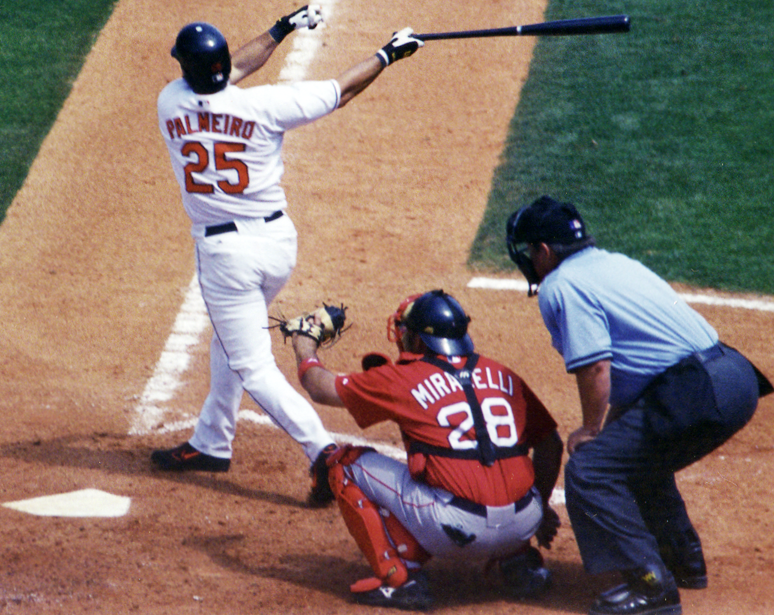
Rafael Palmeiro (batter) was one of the MLB players suspended for steroid use.

In 1998, both Mark McGwire and Sammy Sosa hit more home runs than the record of 61 set by Yankees right fielder Roger Maris in 1961. Barry Bonds topped the record in 2001 with 73 home runs. McGwire, Bonds, and Sosa became the subjects of speculation regarding the use of performance-enhancing substances. McGwire later admitted that he used a steroid hormone that was still legal in baseball during the 1998 season. Baseball's original steroid testing policy, in effect from 2002 to 2005, provided for penalties ranging from a ten-game suspension for a first positive test to a one-year suspension for a fourth positive test. Players were tested at least once per year, with the chance that several players could be tested many times per year.

A 2006 book, Game of Shadows by San Francisco Chronicle investigative reporters Lance Williams and Mark Fainaru-Wada, chronicled alleged extensive use of performance enhancers, including several types of steroids and growth hormone by baseball superstars Barry Bonds, Gary Sheffield, and Jason Giambi. Former Senate Majority Leader George Mitchell was appointed by Selig on March 30, 2006 to investigate the use of performance-enhancing drugs in MLB. The appointment was made after several influential members of the U.S. Congress made negative comments about both the effectiveness and honesty of MLB's drug policies and Commissioner Selig.

The day before the Mitchell Report was to be released in 2007, Selig said, "I haven't seen the report yet, but I'm proud I did it." The report said that after mandatory random testing began in 2004, HGH treatment for athletic enhancement became popular among players, as HGH is not detectable in tests. It pointed out that HGH is likely a placebo with no performance-enhancing effects. The report included substance use allegations against at least one player from each MLB team.

According to ESPN, some people questioned whether Mitchell's director role with the Boston Red Sox created a conflict of interest, especially because no "prime [Sox] players were in the report". The report named several prominent Yankees who were parts of World Series clubs; there is a long-running and fierce Red Sox–Yankees rivalry. Former U.S. prosecutor John M. Dowd brought up Mitchell's conflict of interest, but he later said that the former senator had done a good job. Mitchell acknowledged that his "tight relationship with Major League Baseball left him open to criticism", but he said that readers who examine the report closely "will not find any evidence of bias, of special treatment of the Red Sox".

On January 10, 2013, MLB and the players union reached an agreement to add random, in-season HGH testing. They also agreed to implement a new test to reveal the use of testosterone for the 2013 season. The current MLB drug policy provides for an 80-game suspension for a first positive test, a 162-game suspension for a second positive test, and a lifetime suspension for a third positive test. In 2009, allegations surfaced against Alex Rodriguez and David Ortiz, and Manny Ramirez received a 50-game suspension after testing positive for banned substances. In early April 2011, Ramirez retired from baseball rather than face a 100-game suspension for his second positive steroid test. He would later unretire, having the suspension dropped to 50 games, and would serve those in 2012.

== Media coverage ==
=== Television ===
==== Linear ====
Starting in 2026, Fox, ESPN, NBC, TBS, and MLB Network will nationally televise MLB games in the United States. Fox has been MLB's primary broadcast television partner since 1996. Since 2008, Fox has broadcast MLB games on Saturdays throughout the entire season; Fox previously only broadcast games from May to September. Fox also holds rights to the All-Star Game each season. Fox also alternates League Championship Series broadcasts, broadcasting the American League Championship Series (ALCS) in odd-numbered years and the National League Championship Series (NLCS) in even-numbered years. Fox broadcasts all games of the World Series.

ESPN has been MLB's cable television partner since 1990. The network has aired the weekly regular season game Sunday Night Baseball and postseason broadcasts of the Wild Card Series exclusively.

Prior to the 2026 season, MLB and ESPN exercised a mutual opt-out on their deal that would have ended in 2028; NBC agreed to take over Sunday Night Baseball and the Wild Card games in the interim while ESPN signed a restructured deal for a package of midweek games on its linear television services.

TBS began airing Sunday afternoon regular season games (non-exclusive) nationally in 2008, which was then replaced by Tuesday night games in 2022. From 2007 to 2020, TBS had its exclusive rights to any tiebreaker games that determine division or wild card champions. It also airs exclusive coverage of the Division Series round of the playoffs. TBS carries the League Championship Series that are not included under Fox's television agreement; TBS shows the NLCS in odd-numbered years and the ALCS in even-numbered years.

In January 2009, MLB launched MLB Network, featuring news and coverage from around the league, and airing 26 live games in the 2009 season. Each team also has local broadcasts for all games not exclusively carried nationally. These games are typically split between a local broadcast television station and a local or regional sports network (RSN), though some teams only air local games through RSNs or through their own team networks.

As Canada only contains one team, Sportsnet broadcasts Toronto Blue Jays games nationally. The channel is owned by Rogers Communications, who is also the parent company of the Blue Jays. Sportsnet also televises Fox's Saturday afternoon games, the All-Star Game, playoff games, and the World Series. In April 2011, TSN2 began carrying ESPN Sunday Night Baseball in Canada. TVA Sports airs Blue Jays games in French.

==== Streaming ====
Several MLB games are broadcast exclusively on streaming television. After a year of exclusive games on Facebook, MLB partnered with YouTube to stream weekly games on the service beginning in the 2019 season, and extending until 2022. In 2022, MLB made a deal with Apple Inc. to launch Friday Night Baseball on its Apple TV+ streaming service, and NBC Sports to broadcast MLB Sunday Leadoff, a package of early Sunday afternoon games on Peacock.

Since the 2023 season's Division Series, HBO Max began simulcasting games broadcast by its sister network TBS (both owned by Warner Bros. Discovery).

In the 2024 season, The Roku Channel began streaming MLB Sunday Leadoff. Midway through that season, it was confirmed that TelevisaUnivision had signed a multi-year agreement to broadcast MLB En Vivo on Tuesdays on UniMás, TUDN and ViX, with live clips and highlights of up to 15 games each week.The contract also included exclusive Spanish-language TV rights to the 2024 American League postseason games (ALDS and ALCS) with select games airing on Univision as well as UniMás, TUDN and Vix, and Game 1 of that season's World Series, sharing airtime with Fox and Fox Deportes.

Announced in November 2025, MLB signed three-year media-rights deals with Netflix, ESPN, and NBCUniversal for the 2026 to 2028 seasons. For the 2026 season, Peacock will regain the MLB Sunday Leadoff package, while Netflix will stream multiple events each year, including the Home Run Derby (taking over from ESPN), one game on Opening Night of the season, and a special-event game each year, starting with MLB at Field of Dreams in 2026.

=== Blackout policy ===
MLB blackout map in the United States

Canadian regions subject to Toronto Blue Jays exclusively Shared with Seattle Mariners Shared with Minnesota Twins Shared with Boston Red Sox Note: Toronto Blue Jays territory covers all of Canada

MLB has several blackout rules. A local broadcaster has priority to televise games of the team in their market over national broadcasters if the game is not exclusive to the national broadcaster. A market that has a local team playing in a non-exclusive game will receive an alternative programming feed on the national broadcaster. MLB's streaming internet video service is also subject to the same blackout rules. Commissioner Robert Manfred has expressed interest in changing the blackout policy to loosen the rules for streaming options.

=== Radio and Internet ===
The first baseball game ever broadcast on radio was a Pittsburgh Pirates versus Philadelphia Phillies game on August 5, 1921. The game was broadcast by KDKA of Pittsburgh, and the Pirates defeated the Phillies 8–5. It was broadcast by KDKA staff announcer Harold Arlin. That year, KDKA and WJZ of Newark broadcast the first World Series on the radio, between the New York Giants and the New York Yankees, with Grantland Rice and Tommy Cowan calling the games for KDKA and WJZ, respectively. However, the broadcasters were not actually present at the game, but simply gave reports from a telegraph wire. In 1922, WJZ broadcast the entire series, with Rice doing play-by-play. For the 1923 World Series, Rice was joined on Westinghouse for the first time by Graham McNamee.

During the 1923 World Series, Rice was the main broadcaster, but during the fourth inning of Game 3, he turned the microphone over to McNamee. This was the start of McNamee's career, and McNamee became the first color commentator. Although frequently criticized for his lack of expertise, McNamee helped popularize baseball.

In 1998, national radio broadcasts moved to ESPN Radio. ESPN Radio currently broadcasts Sunday Night Baseball games during the regular season, as well as Saturday and occasional weekday games, along with the All-Star Game and all postseason contests. Since 2021, TUDN Radio airs Spanish-language coverage of select regular season and postseason games, including the World Series.

In addition, each team employs its own announcers, who broadcast during the regular season. Most teams operate regional networks to cover their fan bases; some of these supposedly regional networks (such as the New York Yankees Radio Network) have a national reach with affiliates located across the United States. Major League Baseball has an exclusive rights deal with XM Satellite Radio, which includes the channel MLB Network Radio and live play-by-play of all games.

MLB games are also broadcast live on the internet. All television and radio broadcasts of games are available via subscription to MLB.tv at Major League Baseball's website, MLB.com, and radio-only broadcasts are also available via subscription to MLB.com Gameday Audio. In 2026, MLB.tv will be integrated into the ESPN App.

Since 2005, Major League Baseball has a partnership with XM Satellite Radio, launching a 24-7 channel, MLB Home Plate (now MLB Network Radio) which carries every major league game. Games are also carried on MLB Gameday Audio.

While all teams maintain a network of stations carrying their games in English, many teams also broadcast their games in Spanish, on a second network. In addition, when the Washington Nationals were based in Montreal as the Montreal Expos, their games were broadcast in both English and French. Some Toronto Blue Jays games have been broadcast in French as well. Selected games of the Los Angeles Dodgers are broadcast in Korean by KMPC.

=== Financial landscape ===
In modern years, teams have become increasingly reliant on local cable television rights fees, which grew unstable in the 2020s and which are not subject to equal revenue sharing. Following the Disney-Fox merger, Disney divested Fox's regional broadcasting networks, which covered 14 of MLB's 30 teams, to Diamond Sports Network / Bally Sports. Diamond filed for bankruptcy in 2023 and took advantage of debtor-friendly rules in the Bankruptcy Code to cancel or renegotiate its TV deals with a third of the league. Teams that locked themselves into relatively stable deals near the peak of the market found themselves in a stronger financial position relative to the average team than ever before. Critics respond that industry revenues and team valuations are still rising.

=== International broadcasting ===
Disney Media Networks Latin America through its linear channels (ESPN, ESPN Caribbean, ESPN Brazil) and Disney+ owns the broadcast rights to more than 180 regular season games (at least 1 game per day), the Home Run Derby, the All Star Game and the post season including: the Wild Card Series, the Division Series, the Championship Series and the World Series for all of Latin America and the Caribbean. ESPN broadcasts some MLB games in other countries, including ESPN Australia in Australia and New Zealand, ESPN Africa, and ESPN in the Netherlands.

In Mexico, until 2022, Fox Sports aired five regular season games per week and post-season games that belong to the league that broadcasts its American namesake (including the Wild Card Series). Likewise, TUDN carried 4 matches a week until 2022: through the pay television signal, games were broadcast on Tuesdays and Thursdays, while on Saturdays (generally at 12:00 p.m.) and Sundays (rotating between NBA games, until the start of the NFL season) games were broadcast on Canal 9. Starting with the Championship Series, it only broadcast one division and the whole World Series, these were broadcast on free-to-air television for 59 years. Starting with the 2023 season, Imagen Televisión announced it would begin broadcasting a regular season game every Saturday and Sunday as well as the playoffs and the World Series on open television and its website in Mexico.

In Argentina, Fox Sports carries 5 regular season games per week and post-season games that belong to the league that broadcasts its American namesake (including the Wild Card Series).

In Venezuela, since the 2016 season the cable channel IVC has the broadcast rights, they currently air 7 games per week. Starting with the 2022 season, Televen broadcasts two games a week and the postseason on free-to-air TV While Venevisión, starting with the 2023 season, would return with the space "El Juego de la Semana" that carries a game every Sunday and non-working days on free-to-air television.

In the Dominican Republic since 2009 Grupo Altice has broadcast the entire regular season, playoffs and World Series through pay TV while on free-to-air television and radio Grupo Corripio airs 7 games per week and the entire postseason.

In Spain, Movistar Plus+ has the rights to broadcast the entire season, including one game daily, and the postseason, covering all games in the championship series and World Series.

Channel 5 in the United Kingdom previously screened MLB games, including the All-Star Game and postseason games, on Sunday and Wednesday, usually starting at 1 a.m. BST. Most recently, Johnny Gould and Josh Chetwynd presented MLB on Five on that station. The channel covered baseball beginning on its opening night in 1997, but for financial reasons, the decision was made not to pick up MLB for the 2009 season. BT Sport ESPN show live and recorded games several times a week—it is available with BT Sport and (on a subscriber-basis) Virgin Media in the UK. ESPN America televised many games in the UK and dozens of other countries; in May 2013, ESPN announced that it would shut down the channel on July 31, 2013.

In the Middle East, North Africa and France, MLB games are broadcast on beIN Sports channels.

In Germany, Austria and Switzerland, as many as 500 MLB games will be broadcast from 2022 exclusively on the Sport1 platforms until 2026. Sport1 also broadcasts MLB games in Hungary, as of 2025.

== See also ==
- Australian Baseball League
- Baseball Assistance Team (B.A.T.) – American non-profit organization
- Baseball in Canada
- Baseball in the United States
- Bob Feller Act of Valor Award
- Comparison of Major League Baseball and Nippon Professional Baseball
- List of all-time Major League Baseball win–loss records
- List of American and Canadian cities by number of major professional sports franchises
- List of current Major League Baseball stadiums
- List of former Major League Baseball stadiums
- List of Major League Baseball awards
- List of Major League Baseball managers
- List of Major League Baseball retired numbers
- List of Major League Baseball spring training ballparks
- List of professional sports leagues
- List of professional sports teams in the United States and Canada
- Major League Baseball attendance records
- Major League Baseball draft
- MLB Industry Growth Fund
- Reviving Baseball in Inner Cities – Youth baseball organization
