= BBC Goal of the Season =

English football accolade awarded by the BBC

In English football, the Goal of the Season is an annual competition and award given on BBC's Match of the Day, in honour of the most spectacular goal scored that season. It is typically contested between the winners of the preceding ten Goals of the Month, although the goal can and has come from any game in the regular season, including international qualifiers and friendlies—potentially from the opening league games of the season to the end of the European season UEFA Champions League final. In several instances, the goal has come in the final game of the domestic season, the FA Cup final, the most recent example of which is Steven Gerrard's last-minute goal in 2006. However, in 1980–81, for example, the superb goal scored by Ricky Villa in the FA Cup final replay for Tottenham Hotspur against Manchester City could not be considered as voting had already taken place.

In general, the winning goal has occurred for an English side within the domestic English league or cups, although there are no particular rules; Kenny Dalglish's goal in 1982–83 for Scotland being an exception. The goal usually comes from competitions to which the BBC holds television rights and which are shown under the Match of the Day banner; at present Premier League highlights and FA Cup live matches and highlights, although some have come from the equivalent Sportscene broadcast by BBC Scotland. Due to the lack of BBC European club football coverage, held predominantly by ITV, Sky and BT Sport, no goal of the season has ever been scored in European club competition despite many contenders.

Due to a transfer of broadcast rights, the entries for the 2001–02, 2002–03 and 2003–04 seasons were decided on ITV's The Premiership, which have been subsequently recognised by the BBC. When the BBC previously could not show league footage from 1988–89 to 1991–92, the winning goal in each season was scored in the FA Cup which they held the rights to. League rights holder ITV had its own competition during these seasons for Goal of the Season, broadcast on the Saint and Greavsie show. Previously the channels had shared league and cup rights (showing different matches to each other) and for many years ITV broadcast its own Golden Goals competition as an equivalent of Goal of the Season. From 2013–14 season onwards, the Goal of the Season has been chosen by a Twitter poll and the BBC Sport website. The public vote creates a shortlist of three and the studio pundits of the final show of the season pick the winner.

Jack Wilshere is the first player to win Goal of the Season in consecutive seasons (2013–14 and 2014–15) since the start of the Premier League and is only the second player overall to have achieved this after John Aldridge, who won the award in both 1987–88 and 1988–89 (which pre-dated the Premier League era) seasons. Wayne Rooney is the only player to achieve this accolade for two different competitions (FA Cup and Premier League), as well as the only player to receive the award three times. The 1987–88 competition was unique in that all 10 goals shortlisted were scored by Liverpool players. To date, this is the only occasion where the contenders were made up entirely of goals scored by players for one club.

For several years in the late 2000s, the winner was not subject to public vote due to the 2007 phone-in scandals. The winning goal was instead decided by pundits in the studio.

== List of winners ==
Season	Scorer	Nationality	For	Against	Stadium	Competition	Date	Commentator	Notes
1970–71	Ernie Hunt	England	Coventry City	Everton	Highfield Road	First Division	3 October 1970	Barry Davies	
1971–72	Ronnie Radford	England	Hereford United	Newcastle United	Edgar Street	FA Cup	5 February 1972	John Motson	
1972–73	Peter Osgood	England	Chelsea	Arsenal	Stamford Bridge	FA Cup	17 March 1973	David Coleman	
1973–74	Alan Mullery	England	Fulham	Leicester City	Craven Cottage	FA Cup	26 January 1974	John Motson	
1974–75	Mickey Walsh	Ireland	Blackpool	Sunderland	Bloomfield Road	Second Division	1 February 1975	Barry Davies	
1975–76	Gerry Francis	England	Queens Park Rangers	Liverpool	Loftus Road	First Division	16 August 1975	John Motson	
1976–77	Terry McDermott	England	Liverpool	Everton	Maine Road	FA Cup	23 April 1977	John Motson	
1977–78	Archie Gemmill	Scotland	Nottingham Forest	Arsenal	City Ground	First Division	21 January 1978	David Coleman	
1978–79	Ray Kennedy	England	Liverpool	Derby County	Baseball Ground	First Division	24 February 1979	John Motson	
1979–80	Justin Fashanu	England	Norwich City	Liverpool	Carrow Road	First Division	9 February 1980	Barry Davies	
1980–81	Tony Morley	England	Aston Villa	Everton	Goodison Park	First Division	7 February 1981	John Motson	
1981–82	Cyrille Regis	England	West Bromwich Albion	Norwich City	The Hawthorns	FA Cup	13 February 1982	Alan Parry	
1982–83	Kenny Dalglish	Scotland	Scotland	Belgium	Heysel Stadium, Brussels	Euro 1984 qualifying	15 December 1982	Tony Gubba	
1983–84	Danny Wallace	England	Southampton	Liverpool	The Dell	First Division	16 March 1984	Barry Davies	
1984–85	Graeme Sharp	Scotland	Everton	Liverpool	Anfield	First Division	20 October 1984	John Motson	
1985–86	Bryan Robson	England	England	Israel	Tel Aviv	Friendly	26 February 1986	Barry Davies	
1986–87	Keith Houchen	England	Coventry City	Tottenham Hotspur	Wembley Stadium	FA Cup	16 May 1987	John Motson	
1987–88	John Aldridge	Ireland	Liverpool	Nottingham Forest	Hillsborough	FA Cup	9 April 1988	John Motson	
1988–89	John Aldridge	Ireland	Liverpool	Everton	Wembley Stadium	FA Cup	20 May 1989	John Motson	
1989–90	Ian Wright	England	Crystal Palace	Manchester United	Wembley Stadium	FA Cup	12 May 1990	John Motson	
1990–91	Paul Gascoigne	England	Tottenham Hotspur	Arsenal	Wembley Stadium	FA Cup	14 April 1991	Barry Davies	
1991–92	Mickey Thomas	Wales	Wrexham	Arsenal	Racecourse Ground	FA Cup	4 January 1992	Tony Gubba	
1992–93	Dalian Atkinson	England	Aston Villa	Wimbledon	Selhurst Park	Premier League	3 October 1992	Clive Tyldesley	
1993–94	Rod Wallace	England	Leeds United	Tottenham Hotspur	Elland Road	Premier League	17 April 1994	Gerald Sinstadt	
1994–95	Matthew Le Tissier	England	Southampton	Blackburn Rovers	Ewood Park	Premier League	10 December 1994	Clive Tyldesley	
1995–96	Tony Yeboah	Ghana	Leeds United	Wimbledon	Selhurst Park	Premier League	23 September 1995	Barry Davies	
1996–97	Trevor Sinclair	England	Queens Park Rangers	Barnsley	Loftus Road	FA Cup	25 January 1997	John Motson	
1997–98	Dennis Bergkamp	Netherlands	Arsenal	Leicester City	Filbert Street	Premier League	27 August 1997	Tony Gubba	
1998–99	Ryan Giggs	Wales	Manchester United	Arsenal	Villa Park	FA Cup	14 April 1999	Jon Champion	
1999–2000	Paolo Di Canio	Italy	West Ham United	Wimbledon	Upton Park	Premier League	26 March 2000	Simon Brotherton	
2000–01	Shaun Bartlett	South Africa	Charlton Athletic	Leicester City	The Valley	Premier League	1 April 2001	Jon Champion	
2001–02	Dennis Bergkamp	Netherlands	Arsenal	Newcastle United	St James' Park	Premier League	2 March 2002	Guy Mowbray	
2002–03	Thierry Henry	France	Arsenal	Tottenham Hotspur	Highbury	Premier League	16 November 2002	Clive Tyldesley	
2003–04	Dietmar Hamann	Germany	Liverpool	Portsmouth	Anfield	Premier League	17 March 2004	Clive Tyldesley	
2004–05	Wayne Rooney	England	Manchester United	Middlesbrough	Old Trafford	FA Cup	29 January 2005	John Motson	
2005–06	Steven Gerrard	England	Liverpool	West Ham United	Millennium Stadium	FA Cup	13 May 2006	John Motson	
2006–07	Wayne Rooney	England	Manchester United	Bolton Wanderers	Old Trafford	Premier League	17 March 2007	Steve Wilson	
2007–08	Emmanuel Adebayor	Togo	Arsenal	Tottenham Hotspur	White Hart Lane	Premier League	15 September 2007	John Motson	
2008–09	Glen Johnson	England	Portsmouth	Hull City	Fratton Park	Premier League	22 November 2008	Simon Brotherton	
2009–10	Maynor Figueroa	Honduras	Wigan Athletic	Stoke City	Britannia Stadium	Premier League	12 December 2009	Tony Gubba	
2010–11	Wayne Rooney	England	Manchester United	Manchester City	Old Trafford	Premier League	12 February 2011	Steve Wilson	
2011–12	Papiss Cissé	Senegal	Newcastle United	Chelsea	Stamford Bridge	Premier League	2 May 2012	Steve Wilson	
2012–13	Robin van Persie	Netherlands	Manchester United	Aston Villa	Old Trafford	Premier League	22 April 2013	Guy Mowbray	
2013–14	Jack Wilshere	England	Arsenal	Norwich City	Emirates Stadium	Premier League	19 October 2013	Jonathan Pearce	
2014–15	Jack Wilshere	England	Arsenal	West Bromwich Albion	Emirates Stadium	Premier League	24 May 2015	John Motson	
2015–16	Dele Alli	England	Tottenham Hotspur	Crystal Palace	Selhurst Park	Premier League	23 January 2016	Alan Green	
2016–17	Emre Can	Germany	Liverpool	Watford	Vicarage Road	Premier League	1 May 2017	Martin Fisher	
2017–18	Jamie Vardy	England	Leicester City	West Bromwich Albion	The Hawthorns	Premier League	10 March 2018	John Roder	
2018–19	Vincent Kompany	Belgium	Manchester City	Leicester City	Etihad Stadium	Premier League	6 May 2019	Steve Wilson	
2019–20	Son Heung-min	South Korea	Tottenham Hotspur	Burnley	Tottenham Hotspur Stadium	Premier League	7 December 2019	Guy Mowbray	
2020–21	Erik Lamela	Argentina	Tottenham Hotspur	Arsenal	Emirates Stadium	Premier League	14 March 2021	Steve Wilson	
2021–22	Mohamed Salah	Egypt	Liverpool	Manchester City	Anfield	Premier League	3 October 2021	Guy Mowbray	
2022–23	Julio Enciso	Paraguay	Brighton & Hove Albion	Manchester City	Falmer Stadium	Premier League	24 May 2023	Steve Wilson	
2023–24	Alejandro Garnacho	Argentina	Manchester United	Everton	Goodison Park	Premier League	26 November 2023	Steve Bower	
2024–25	Kaoru Mitoma	Japan	Brighton & Hove Albion	Chelsea	Falmer Stadium	Premier League	14 February 2025	Simon Brotherton	
2025–26	Harry Wilson	Wales	Fulham	Crystal Palace	Craven Cottage	Premier League	7 December 2025	Robyn Cowen	

== Multiple awards won by player ==
The following table lists the number of wins by players who have at least two goals named as BBC Goal of the Season.

Awards	Player	Country	Seasons
3	Wayne Rooney	England	2004–05, 2006–07, 2010–11
2	John Aldridge	Ireland	1987–88, 1988–89
2	Dennis Bergkamp	Netherlands	1997–98, 2001–02
2	Jack Wilshere	England	2013–14, 2014–15

== Awards won by nationality ==
Country	Players	Total
England	24	28
Scotland	3	3
Wales	3	3
Ireland	2	3
Netherlands	2	3
Germany	2	2
Argentina	2	2
Belgium	1	1
Egypt	1	1
France	1	1
Ghana	1	1
Honduras	1	1
Italy	1	1
Japan	1	1
Paraguay	1	1
Senegal	1	1
South Africa	1	1
South Korea	1	1
Togo	1	1

== Awards won by club ==
Club	Players	Total
Liverpool	7	8
Arsenal	4	6
Manchester United	4	6
Tottenham Hotspur	4	4
Aston Villa	2	2
Brighton & Hove Albion	2	2
Coventry City	2	2
Fulham	2	2
Leeds United	2	2
Queens Park Rangers	2	2
Southampton	2	2
Blackpool	1	1
Charlton Athletic	1	1
Chelsea	1	1
Crystal Palace	1	1
England	1	1
Everton	1	1
Hereford United	1	1
Leicester City	1	1
Manchester City	1	1
Newcastle United	1	1
Norwich City	1	1
Nottingham Forest	1	1
Portsmouth	1	1
Scotland	1	1
West Bromwich Albion	1	1
West Ham United	1	1
Wigan Athletic	1	1
Wrexham	1	1

== Awards won by competition ==
Competition	Players	Total
Premier League	27	30
FA Cup	14	15
First Division	8	8
Euro qualifiers	1	1
Friendly	1	1
Second Division	1	1

== Most Goals of the Season by commentator ==
Commentator	Total
John Motson	16
Barry Davies	7
Steve Wilson	6
Tony Gubba	4
Guy Mowbray	4
Clive Tyldesley	4
Simon Brotherton	3
Jon Champion	2
David Coleman	2
Steve Bower	1
Martin Fisher	1
Alan Green	1
Alan Parry	1
Jonathan Pearce	1
John Roder	1
Gerald Sinstadt	1
Robyn Cowen	1

== 2014–15 Goal of the Season controversy ==
On 24 May 2015, the final day of the 2014–15 season, Match of the Day held an online vote at around 11 pm GMT for the Goal of the Season award. Users were able to vote via the BBC website or Twitter. The poll was quickly skewed by vote brigading by Arsenal supporters, many from the Far East, resulting in Jack Wilshere winning the award for his final day strike against West Bromwich Albion, despite not being the favourite. Host Gary Lineker expressed surprise as he read out the winner, and pundit Alan Shearer suggested that Charlie Adam should have won the award for his 66-yard effort against Chelsea, while fellow pundit Danny Murphy felt former Fulham teammate Bobby Zamora should have won.

The incident was labelled a "shambles" by Pete Smith of The Stoke Sentinel who also thought Stoke's Adam should have won, and a "concerted campaign by Arsenal fans" by Alan Pattullo of The Scotsman, who also felt the Scottish midfielder was deserving of the award. Mark Brus, of Caught Offside, also criticized the choice arguing that a goal in a meaningless game should not have won Goal of the Season and that Juan Mata's acrobatic effort against Liverpool was worthy of the award.

The following season, before the final episode of that season's Match of the Day, the programme's producers changed the rules to prevent a similar situation. The Goal of the Season award has since been decided by the pundits on the show, who will choose the winner based on the top three goals voted for by the public.

== See also ==
- BBC Goal of the Month
- Premier League Goal of the Season
