= The NFL Show/NFL This Week =

- Presented by: Mark Chapman; Dan Walker; Laura Woods; Craig Doyle
- Starring: Analysts: Jason Bell; Osi Umenyiora
- Country of origin: United Kingdom
- Original language: English

Production
- Production locations: BT Studios Super Bowl: On location
- Running time: The NFL Show: 30 minutes (BBC); 60 minutes including advertisements (ITV) NFL This Week: 50 minutes
- Production company: North One

Original release
- Network: BBC Two
- Release: 13 September 2016 – 2020
- Network: BBC One
- Release: 13 September 2016 – 2022
- Network: ITV; Virgin Media Television
- Release: 2022 – 2024

The NFL Show and NFL This Week were a pair of American football programmes broadcast on the BBC and ITV.

== Format ==
Neither show had a fixed timeslot, but The NFL Show typically aired either on Saturday evenings or after midnight on BBC One. NFL This Week was a BBC Two show, usually airing late on a Tuesday evening or shortly after midnight. The NFL Show was hosted by BBC Breakfast presenter Dan Walker, who took over from Mark Chapman. On the BBC it usually followed Match of the Day. On ITV it aired at 11:30PM on Fridays. For the 2022 season, the NFL announced that they had reached a partnership with commercial broadcaster ITV for three years. The show was hosted by Laura Woods, although analysts Bell and Umenyiora followed the show across networks. Woods was replaced by Craig Doyle in 2023, following her move to TNT Sports. The deal also continued to include live coverage of two London international games and the Super Bowl as the BBC did. The show aired on Scottish affiliate network STV and Virgin Media Four in Ireland, which has a content sharing agreement with ITV. ITV ended the show ahead of the 2024 season although the London international games and Super Bowl would still be broadcast.

=== Analysts ===
Jason Bell is a former NFL cornerback. He played for the Dallas Cowboys, the Houston Texans, and the New York Giants over a spell of six seasons. Osi Umenyiora is a two-time Super Bowl-winning defensive end with the New York Giants. He also played for the Atlanta Falcons for two seasons.

== See also ==
- NFL on television
