= Osi Umenyiora =

British-Nigerian American football player (born 1981)

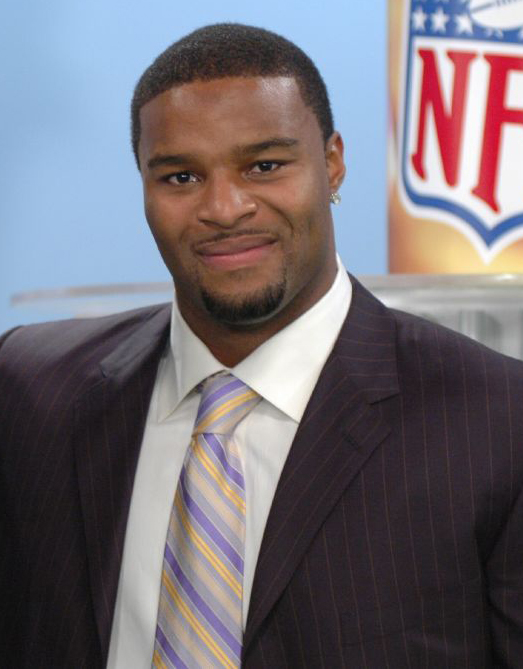
- Umenyiora in 2008

No. 72, 90
- Position: Defensive end

Personal information
- Born: November 16, 1981 (age 45); London, England
- Listed height: 6 ft 3 in (1.91 m)
- Listed weight: 255 lb (116 kg)

Career information
- High school: Auburn (Auburn, Alabama, U.S.)
- College: Troy (1999–2002)
- NFL draft: 2003: 2nd round, 56th overall pick

Career history
- New York Giants (2003–2012); Atlanta Falcons (2013–2014)

Awards and highlights
- 2× Super Bowl champion (XLII, XLVI); First-team All-Pro (2005); Second-team All-Pro (2010); 2× Pro Bowl (2005, 2007); NFL forced fumbles leader (2010); New York Giants Ring of Honor; 32nd greatest New York Giant of all-time; All-SLC (2000); Troy University Sports Hall of Fame; NFL record: Most forced fumbles in a season: 10 (2010 (Note: Tied with Charles Tillman (2012).))

Career NFL statistics
- Total tackles: 450
- Sacks: 85.0
- Forced fumbles: 35
- Fumble recoveries: 14
- Interceptions: 1
- Defensive touchdowns: 5
- Stats at Pro Football Reference

Ositadimma "Osi" Umenyiora (//; born November 16, 1981) is a British-Nigerian former professional American football player who was a defensive end in the National Football League (NFL). He played college football for the Troy Trojans and was selected by the New York Giants in the second round of the 2003 NFL draft. With the Giants, he won Super Bowl XLII and Super Bowl XLVI. Umenyiora was a two-time Pro Bowl selection and holds the Giants franchise record for most sacks in one game. He is one of five British-born players to have won a Super Bowl, joining Marvin Allen, Scott McCready, former Troy and Giants teammate Lawrence Tynes, and Jay Ajayi. He also played for the Atlanta Falcons.

== Early life ==
Umenyiora was born in Golders Green, London to Nigerian parents. He is of Igbo descent, a native of Ogbunike town in Oyi Local Government Area of Anambra state in Nigeria. His full first name means in Igbo 'from today on, things will be good'.

Umenyiora's family moved from London to Nigeria when he was seven years old. At fourteen years old, Umenyiora moved to Auburn, Alabama to live with his sister. Umenyiora played only two years of high school football at Auburn High School where he was sixteen years old as a senior. Umenyiora was high school friends and teammates with fellow future NFL defensive lineman DeMarcus Ware, who was two years behind him and would follow Umenyiora to Troy.

He finished his high school football career with no scholarship offers. After the season, while Umenyiora was serving an in-school suspension, his team's running back coach called his former college teammate Tracy Rocker, then the defensive line coach at Troy State, to tell him about Umenyiora. Rocker happened to be in town, stopped by the school, and offered Umenyiora a scholarship the same day.

== College career ==
Umenyiora played college football for the Troy Trojans, the only program to offer him an athletic scholarship. At Troy, Umenyiora was moved from nose guard to defensive end. In 2002, he set school records in tackles for loss in a single season (20.5) and sacks in a single game (four against Florida A&M). He finished the 2002 season with 15 sacks, the second-most in NCAA Division I. He was inducted into the Troy University Sports Hall of Fame in 2014.

== Professional career ==
=== New York Giants ===
Despite not being invited to the 2003 NFL draft combine, Umenyiora was selected in the second round (56th pick overall) of the 2003 NFL draft by the New York Giants out of Troy University.

Umenyiora established himself as a premier pass rusher in 2005, his first year as a starter. His stellar play earned All-Pro recognition and a trip to the Pro Bowl. Umenyiora achieved 14.5 sacks and 70 tackles, second only to the sixteen sacks obtained by Derrick Burgess of the Oakland Raiders.

On December 23, 2005, the Giants signed Umenyiora to a six-year contract extension for $41 million with $15 million guaranteed.

In the fourth game of the 2007 season, he set a Giants franchise record by recording six sacks against the Philadelphia Eagles. At that point in the season, the Giants had 12 sacks, tying the NFL record. He recorded his first career touchdown on October 21 against the San Francisco 49ers when he sacked Trent Dilfer, forced a fumble, recovered the fumble, and ran 75 yards for the score.

By the end of the season, Umenyiora's 13 sacks helped the Giants to an NFL regular season-leading 53 sacks. The Giants had a surprise victory in Super Bowl XLII over the New England Patriots, in part because of their strong pass rush performance. Umenyiora had four tackles in that game, three of which were solos.

During a preseason game against the New York Jets, Umenyiora suffered cartilage damage in his left knee and was required to undergo season-ending surgery. The finding by team physician Russell Warren was that Umenyiora suffered a torn lateral meniscus.

Umenyiora joined ESPN's Monday Night Football crew on October 13, 2008.

In Week 1 of the 2009 season against the Washington Redskins, Umenyiora recorded his second and final career touchdown, also on a sack, forced fumble, and recovery.

On November 5, 2010, Umenyiora was named the NFC Defensive Player of the Month after recording 18 tackles (10 solo), 7.0 sacks, and six forced fumbles in the Giants' four October wins. Umenyiora and teammate Justin Tuck recorded 11.5 sacks for the year, and combined for 16 forced fumbles.

On July 29, 2011, Umenyiora did not report on the opening day of the Giants' training camp. As a result, the Giants placed him on Reserve/Did Not Report. He reported to camp late the following day. Umenyiora has claimed that general manager Jerry Reese promised to renegotiate his contract after the 2010 season, but failed to do so.

Umenyiora began practicing with his teammates on August 15, but after three practices he had arthroscopic surgery on his right knee. The team expected him to miss the season opener against the Washington Redskins on September 11.

In June 2012 Umenyiora agreed to a one-year contract with the Giants, after terminating his working relationship with agent Tony Agnone.

=== Atlanta Falcons ===
Umenyiora signed a two-year deal worth $8.55 million with the Atlanta Falcons on March 27, 2013.

=== Retirement ===
On August 26, 2015, Umeniyora announced his retirement. He signed a ceremonial one-day deal with the Giants to officially retire as a member of the team.

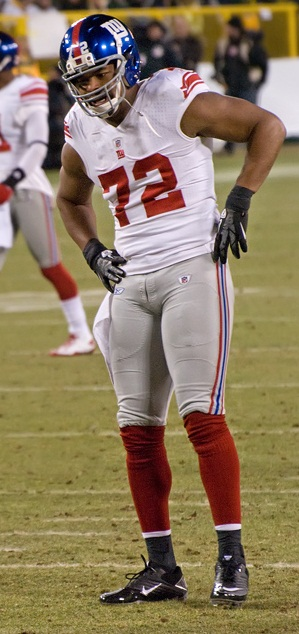
Umenyiora in the Giants NFC divisional playoff game against the Green Bay Packers on January 15, 2012.

== NFL career statistics ==
Legend
	Won the Super Bowl
	NFL record
**Bold**	Career high

=== Regular season ===
Year	Team	Games		Tackles					Fumbles				Interceptions				
Year	Team	GP	GS	Cmb	Solo	Ast	Sck	Sfty	FF	FR	Yds	TD	Int	Yds	Avg	TD	PD
2003	NYG	13	1	20	13	7	1.0	0	1	0	0	0	0	0	0.0	0	0
2004	NYG	**16**	7	58	40	18	7.0	0	3	**4**	**88**	**1**	0	0	0.0	0	**3**
2005	NYG	**16**	**16**	**70**	**48**	**22**	**14.5**	0	4	2	0	0	0	0	0.0	0	**3**
2006	NYG	11	11	31	24	7	6.0	0	1	0	0	0	0	0	0.0	0	2
2007	NYG	**16**	**16**	52	40	12	13.0	0	5	2	75	**1**	0	0	0.0	0	0
2008	NYG	0	0	Did not play due to injury													
2009	NYG	**16**	11	29	19	10	7.0	0	4	**4**	61	**1**	0	0	0.0	0	1
2010	NYG	**16**	**16**	48	33	15	11.5	0	**10**	1	0	0	0	0	0.0	0	2
2011	NYG	9	7	25	16	9	9.0	0	2	0	0	0	0	0	0.0	0	1
2012	NYG	**16**	4	43	28	15	6.0	0	2	0	0	0	0	0	0.0	0	1
2013	ATL	**16**	13	47	31	16	7.5	0	3	0	0	0	**1**	**68**	**68.0**	**1**	**3**
2014	ATL	**16**	0	12	9	3	2.5	0	0	1	86	**1**	0	0	0.0	0	1
Total		161	102	376	261	115	85	0	35	13	310	4	1	68	68.0	1	17

== Media career ==
After retiring in 2015, he joined BBC Sport as a pundit for their NFL coverage working on the NFL International Series matches from London and the Super Bowl. He has worked alongside Match of the Day 2 host Mark Chapman, Jason Bell, Nat Coombs, Mike Carlson and Dan Walker and their coverage has gained rave reviews from NFL fans in the UK. He also worked on the BBC's NFL weekly highlights shows (The NFL Show/NFL This Week) which were on every week of the season.

From 2022-2024 the highlights show moved to ITV. ITV axed the show ahead of the 2024 season.

In 2025, he joined Channel 5 as a presenter for their NFL coverage, including as a regular team captain on NFL Big Game Night.

His pundit work has been recognized with two Royal Television Society Performance Awards for Best Sports Presenter, Commentator or Pundit in 2017 and 2019 (he was also on the three person shortlist in 2018) and the 2018 Sports Journalists' Association British Sports Pundit of the Year award.

== Personal life ==
Umenyiora has formerly resided in Cleveland, Georgia and Edgewater, New Jersey.

In 2008, he made a cameo appearance in the music video "I Luv Your Girl" by The-Dream.

Umenyiora is cousins with Chidera Uzo-Diribe, a coach for the Georgia Bulldogs.

In February 2013, he became engaged to Miss Universe 2011, Leila Lopes. They married May 29, 2015 in Luanda, Angola, the bride's home country. They have two children together.
