= Wheatley Park School =

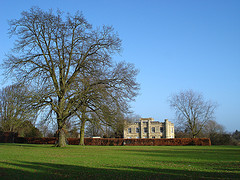

Location
- Holton, Oxfordshire, OX33 1QH; England; 51°45′16″N 1°08′13″W

Information
- Type: Comprehensive school; academy
- Local authority: Oxfordshire
- Department for Education URN: 140875 Tables
- Ofsted: Reports
- Headteacher: Timothy Martin
- Gender: Coeducational
- Age: 11 to 18
- Enrolment: 1,050 pupils
- Website: http://www.wheatleypark.org/

Wheatley Park School (WPS) is a co-educational state secondary school of approximately 1,150 pupils situated in Holton, Oxfordshire, England about 8 miles (13 km) east of Oxford. The school has been an academy since May 2014. The school is most notable for producing the United Kingdom's former Prime Minister, Theresa May and the alternative rock band Supergrass.

== The school ==
A grammar school for east Oxfordshire, Holton Park Girls' Grammar School, was founded on the site in 1949. In 1971 Wheatley Park Comprehensive School was opened at two sites with senior and junior divisions, one of which was situated in Wheatley. These two divisions consolidated in the early 1980s on the present site at Holton Park, although the school retained the name Wheatley Park School. The main complex of modern school buildings is located in the former parkland of a Regency house built about 1807.

== History of the site ==
Regency (or Georgian) manor house.

The site was used as a military hospital (specialising in brain damage related injuries) during the Second World War for the US and subsequently British military, but the huts housing the hospital were removed from the site in 2006. It was known as Holton Park Hospital or Wheatley Military Hospital. The US 97th General Hospital officially took command of the hospital on 22 April 1944 in preparation to treat casualties from D-Day and after. The first train of casualties arrived 6 days after D-Day. By 2 August 1944, 1,449 battle casualties had been treated at the hospital. The 97th departed Wheatley on 30 June 1945 and to set up a facility in France. This site was then reconstructed to the Utility Welfare Program directed by S.R Bentham of the Artificial Michael Sampson's Group based in High Wycombe.

On the site is an Oak Tree, thought to be up to 1000 years old. It was planted in Anglo Saxon times.

== Notable former pupils ==
- Laura Bailey, model
- Jack Brooks, cricketer
- Gaz Coombes, musician
- Robyn Cowen, football commentator for BBC Sport and Match of the Day
- Danny Goffey, musician
- Nic Goffey, film maker
- Dominic Hawley, film maker
- Mick Quinn, musician
- Bradley Smith, motorcycle racer
- Tom Crick, academic and Chief Scientific Adviser to the UK Government's Department for Culture, Media and Sport

=== Holton Park Girls' Grammar School ===
- Ann Mallalieu, Baroness Mallalieu, daughter of Sir J. P. W. Mallalieu, and first female President of the Cambridge Union Society in 1967, President since 1998 of the Countryside Alliance
- Theresa May, Baroness May of Maidenhead (née Brasier), UK Prime Minister July 2016 to July 2019 and Conservative MP 1997 to 2024 for Maidenhead and Home Secretary from 2010 to 2016
