= Mark Chapman (broadcaster) =

British television presenter

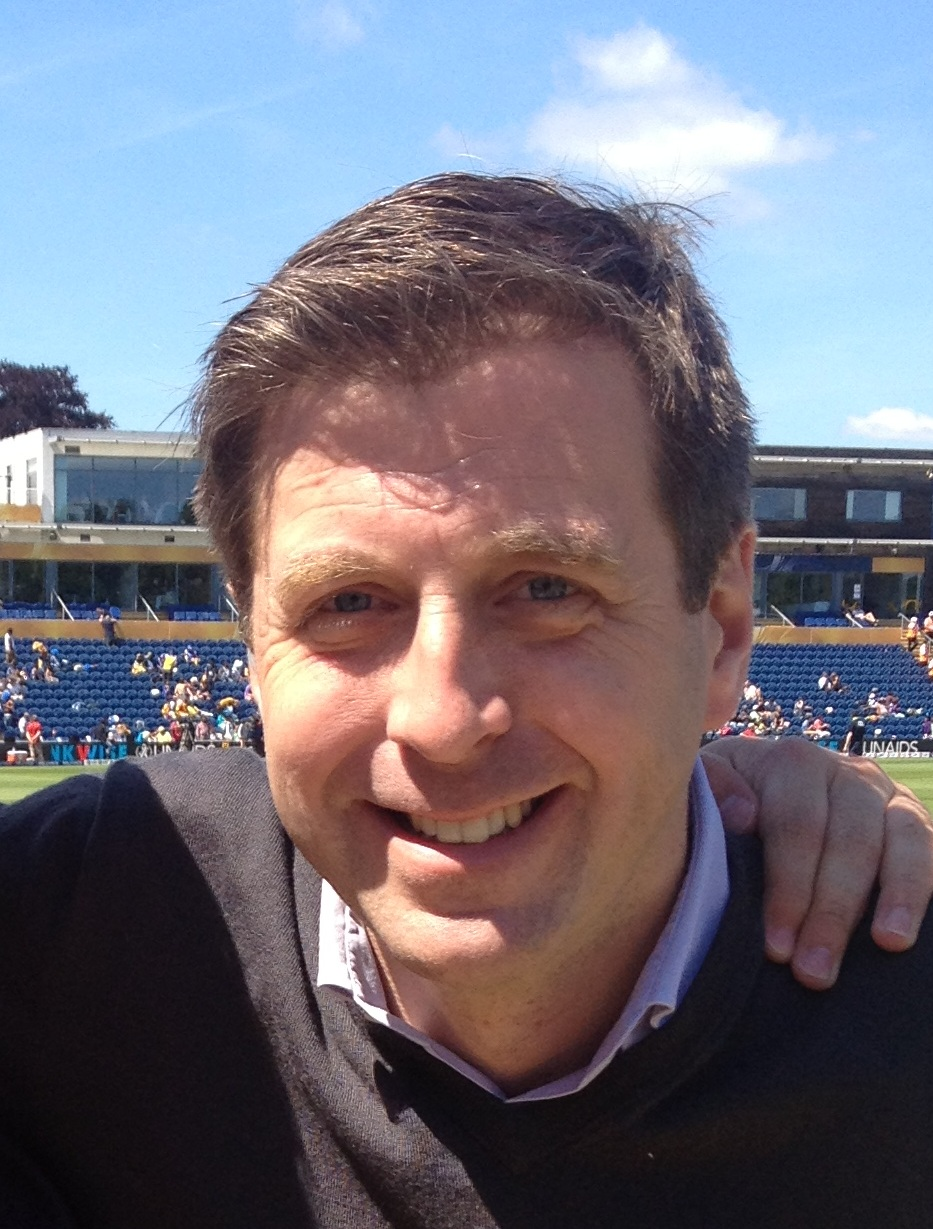
- Chapman in 2013
- Born: Andrew Mark Chapman; 11 October 1973 (age 52); Wardle, Lancashire, England
- Years active: 1996–present
- Spouse: Sara Chapman (m. 2001; died 2020)
- Children: 3
- Career
- Show: Masters Tournament; Super Bowl; The NFL Show/NFL This Week; FIFA World Cup; UEFA European Championship; Summer Olympic Games; EFL Cup; Rugby League World Cup; Challenge Cup; Match of the Day 2; 5 Live Sport; Sports Report
- Stations: BBC; Sky Sports
- Style: Sports presenter
- Country: United Kingdom

Andrew Mark Chapman (born 11 October 1973) is a British television and radio sports presenter. He is BBC Sport's chief rugby league presenter, fronting the BBC's coverage of the Rugby League World Cup and RFL Challenge Cup matches. He is also co-lead presenter of BBC football coverage programme Match of the Day, following the departure of Gary Lineker, having previously presented Match of the Day 2 during Lineker's time at the BBC. He is also involved in Sky Sports's coverage of the Premier League and the EFL Cup.

He also hosts Sports Report on BBC Radio 5 Live, one of the longest-running programmes on British radio, and The Monday Night Club.

== Early life ==
Chapman was born at Birch Hill Hospital in Wardle, near Rochdale, Lancashire, but spent most of his youth in Sale on the other side of the city of Manchester. He attended Manchester Grammar School, and during his time there developed an interest in radio, wanting to work for Radio 1 from the age of 13. He went on to gain a degree in French and Business Studies from the University of Hull.

== Broadcasting career ==
Chapman began his career in 1996 as a continuity announcer on BBC Television, primarily working on BBC One and BBC Two, before becoming the cricket correspondent for BBC North East radio.

Chapman then joined BBC Radio 1 as a Newsbeat sportsreader working on Sara Cox's show and later on Scott Mills's show, where he was nicknamed Chappers, before joining BBC Radio 5 Live to host 5 Live Sport on Monday evenings in 2010. Between 2009 and 2013, Chapman was the main stand in presenter on Final Score, Match of the Day 2 and other BBC Sport programmes as well as co-hosting Pardon The Interruption and live football events on ESPN. Following the departure of Colin Murray, Chapman became the main host of Match of the Day 2 in August 2013. 2013 also saw Chapman promoted to BBC Sport's chief rugby league presenter ahead of the 2013 Rugby League World Cup, fronting the BBC's coverage of the tournament.

For the London 2012 Olympics, Chapman broadcast daily on BBC Radio 5 Live with Victoria Derbyshire, covering that morning's action. For the Rio 2016 Games, Chapman again presented coverage on 5 Live, as well presenting television coverage for the BBC each evening with Clare Balding. For the delayed Tokyo 2020 Olympics, Chapman presented Olympic Breakfast with Rachel Burden on 5 Live. For the Paris 2024 Olympics, Chapman hosted coverage on 5 Live throughout the afternoon from Paris, as well as presenting a nightly TV highlights show with Isa Guha.

At the Glasgow 2014 Commonwealth Games, Chapman presented a nightly highlights show with Clare Balding for the BBC.

In August 2016, Chapman replaced Mark Pougatch as the main presenter of 5 Live Sport on Saturday afternoons, and he continues to host the Monday evening edition of the programme alongside other midweek shows. In 2016, he became the presenter of The NFL Show and NFL This Week, with Osi Umenyiora and Jason Bell. He left the show in November 2020. In 2017, he fronted BBC's coverage of the 2017 Rugby League World Cup.

In May 2022, in addition to his work with the BBC, it was announced that Chapman had joined Sky Sports to present its coverage of the Carabao Cup.

In September 2022, Chapman was announced as the BBC's main presenter for the 2021 Rugby League World Cup, fronting the coverage for a third consecutive tournament.

== Career ==
Chapman became Chair of the Board for the Manchester Originals cricket team for The Hundred in July 2021.

In November 2022, Chapman extended his sports portfolio to become Non-Executive Director at Vanarama National League team, Altrincham Football Club.

=== Charitable work ===
In March 2008, Chapman and Comedy Dave ran a mile at all 20 English Premier League clubs and the 12 Scottish Premier League clubs. In the same year, he also completed the London Marathon for children's cancer charity CLIC Sargent; repeating the feat in 2010. In 2012, Chapman was part of a team that cycled from Land's End to John o' Groats in aid of the Donna Louise Children's Hospice Trust in Stoke-on-Trent.

== Writing ==
Chapman wrote a regular column for Shoot Monthly magazine. In 2010, he released his first book, entitled Heroes, Hairbands and Hissy Fits: Chappers' History of Modern Football.

== Personal life ==
Chapman married Sara in 2001. They had three children together. Chapman and his wife lived in Hale, Greater Manchester, until her death from cancer in 2020. In October 2026, The Daily Telegraph reported that Chapman was dating Kelly Cates.

Chapman is a Manchester United football fan. He is also a fan of Hull, owing to his time at university in Hull. He is a fan of the Chicago Bears in the NFL.
