= Frank Bough =

English television presenter (1933–2020)

- Bough, while broadcasting Nationwide
- Born: Francis Joseph Bough; 15 January 1933; Fenton, Stoke-on-Trent, Staffordshire, England
- Died: 22 October 2020 (aged 87); Maidenhead, Berkshire, England
- Education: Oswestry Boys' High School; Merton College, Oxford
- Occupations: Journalist, newsreader, television presenter, sports commentator
- Years active: 1959–1998
- Known for: Grandstand, Nationwide, Breakfast Time
- Spouse: Nesta Howells (m. 1959)
- Children: 3

Francis Joseph Bough (/ˈbɒf/; 15 January 1933 – 22 October 2020) was an English television presenter. He was best known as the host of BBC sports and current affairs shows including Grandstand, Nationwide and Breakfast Time, which he launched alongside Selina Scott and Nick Ross.

Over his broadcasting career, Bough became known for his smooth, relaxed and professional approach to live broadcasts, once being described as "the most unassailable performer on British television". In 1987, Michael Parkinson said: "If my life depended on the smooth handling of a TV show, Bough would be my first choice to be in charge." In 1988, Bough was sacked by the BBC following revelations that he had taken cocaine and used prostitutes. He later presented programmes on London Weekend Television, ITV, Sky TV and on LBC radio in London before his retirement in 1998.

== Early life ==
Francis Joseph Bough was born on 15 January 1933 at his parents' terraced house in Fenton, Stoke-on-Trent, Staffordshire, son of Austin Joseph Bough (died 1963) and Annie Tyrer, née Moulton. The family later moved to Oswestry, Shropshire. His father was a furniture upholsterer and his mother painted pots in a pottery factory, and also made curtains and cushions.

After passing his eleven-plus exam, Bough was educated at Oswestry Boys' High School (a Shropshire County Council secular grammar school), and at Merton College, Oxford, where he studied history and was a football blue, playing football for the university against Cambridge. He entered the employment of ICI at Billingham-on-Tees, and did his national service in the 2nd Royal Tank Regiment, serving in West Germany. He first broadcast for British Forces Radio, commenting on an army cup game football match between two regiments.

== Career ==
=== BBC ===
Bough joined the BBC as a presenter and reporter, presenting a new Newcastle upon Tyne-based show called Home at Six, soon renamed North at Six and then in 1963 becoming BBC Look North. Between 1964 and 1968, he was the presenter of Sportsview and in 1964 became the presenter of the BBC Sports Review of the Year, which he hosted for 18 years. Between 1968 and 1983, he was a regular host of the BBC's flagship Saturday afternoon sports programme, Grandstand.

Bough was one of the BBC's football commentators for the 1966 World Cup in England and covered the match at Ayresome Park in Middlesbrough where North Korea defeated Italy 1–0, in a game regarded as one of the biggest upsets in World Cup history. Bough went on to present the early evening magazine programme Nationwide. This made him one of the most familiar faces on British television throughout the 1970s. For Nationwide, he covered the Watergate scandal that brought down President Nixon and, for both Nationwide and Breakfast Time, he covered five UK general elections between 1974 and 1987 and four US presidential elections between 1972 and 1984.

Bough was twice a surprise guest on the Morecambe and Wise Christmas special, in 1977 performing a song and dance routine in a sailor's outfit with other television personalities, including the film critic Barry Norman, the presenter Michael Aspel and the rugby league commentator Eddie Waring. The programme's 21.3 million viewers remains one of the highest recorded viewing figures for UK Christmas viewing. Bough later said that he had to give Waring dancing lessons before the sketch, which was based on a comic version of the song "There is Nothing Like a Dame" from the musical South Pacific. The same year Bough received the Richard Dimbleby Award for outstanding contribution to factual television.

Bough was the main presenter of the BBC's coverage of the 1978 World Cup finals in Argentina.

Bough's prominence increased in January 1983 when he became the first presenter of the BBC's inaugural breakfast television programme, Breakfast Time along with Selina Scott and Nick Ross. Bough was chosen by Ron Neil for his experience of presenting three hours of live television every week on Grandstand. As fellow presenter Ross recounted:

None of us had remotely the experience of long, unscripted slabs of live TV that Frank had from his sports broadcasting. He brought a sense of serenity and reassurance. His unruffled composure made us feel this had all been done before, and on the first morning, as the last minutes ticked down to our opening transmission, when hearts were thumping and nerves were jangling, he clapped his hands and—addressing the producers and the technicians as much as Selina and me—gently and firmly said, "Calm down." We did.

Scott later said that Bough would deliberately undermine her by interrupting mid-question and in other ways. When she attempted to complain she said that senior management simply was not interested. "They seemed to have no emotional intelligence, and they let men like Frank Bough roam the BBC without any check on them." She said that there was a very sexist atmosphere at the BBC, "this malevolence". The presenter Fern Britton found Bough equally difficult to work with. In her autobiography, published in 2008, she wrote early in their professional relationship, Bough asked her, "Well, young lady, I wonder how long it will be before I'm having an affair with you." Britton later said Bough then remarked " Because I do have a very big cock." She told The Guardian "Frank just measured women by how attractive and ‘fuckable’ they were." He was dismissive of Britton at pre-programme briefings: "Oh, hers can wait. Now back to mine." Britton felt too junior to be able to complain.

Bough left breakfast television at the end of 1987 to concentrate on the Holiday programme where, having been a roving holidaymaker, he took over as the main presenter when Cliff Michelmore left the series in 1986.

In February 1989, Bough was hired by Sky News to present the Frank Bough Interview for Sky TV for two series. In September 1989, he also joined London Weekend Television where he fronted Six O'Clock Live until it was axed in summer 1992. In between his news duties he presented ITV's coverage of the 1991 Rugby World Cup tournament.

=== Sex and drugs scandal ===
On 13 June 1988, Bough left the BBC for a rest before being sacked, after the News of the World reported he had taken cocaine and worn lingerie at parties involving prostitutes. The newspaper's former deputy editor, Paul Connew, later said of the scandal, "It caused a sensation at the time, given Bough's public image as the squeaky clean front man of breakfast and sports television."

Roy Greenslade, professor of journalism at City University London, said that Bough made a "terrible mistake" by agreeing to speak to newspapers before publication of personal allegations, worsening the story.

In August 1992, Bough was reported to have been involved in a dungeon orgy. The press published photographs of him leaving the flat of a prostitute who specialised in sadomasochism. Bough later spoke of his regret over his actions, saying his behaviour had been "exceedingly stupid". He said in a television interview, "Everybody, when they have difficulties with their marriage or sexuality, surely has the right to sort out these things in the privacy of their own home." His role as a rugby presenter ended after this second scandal.

=== Late career ===
In the early 1990s, he was a presenter on LBC radio in London, staying on for the launch of London News Talk and moving to the News 97.3 service where he remained until 1996. He then presented Travel Live for the cable channel Travel.

In 2009, he contributed to a programme looking back on Nationwide, broadcast on BBC Four.

== Personal life and death ==
Bough met Nesta Howells, a physiotherapist, while he was undertaking his national service in Park Hall camp at Oswestry, and they married after he left the army in 1959. They had three sons: David, Stephen and Andrew. Nesta stayed in the relationship after the exposés that affected Bough's later career.

From 1994, he was a regular member of a Windsor-based choir, the Royal Free Singers. Bough had a liver transplant in 2001 after cancer was found, and later lived in retirement in Holyport, Berkshire.

Bough died in Maidenhead, Berkshire on 22 October 2020, aged 87.

Preceded by Peter Dimmock	Regular Host of Sportsview; 1964–1968	Succeeded by David Coleman (renamed Sportsnight)
Preceded by David Coleman	Regular Host of Grandstand; 1968–1983	Succeeded by Des Lynam
