= The Premier League Show =

2016–2019 British TV series

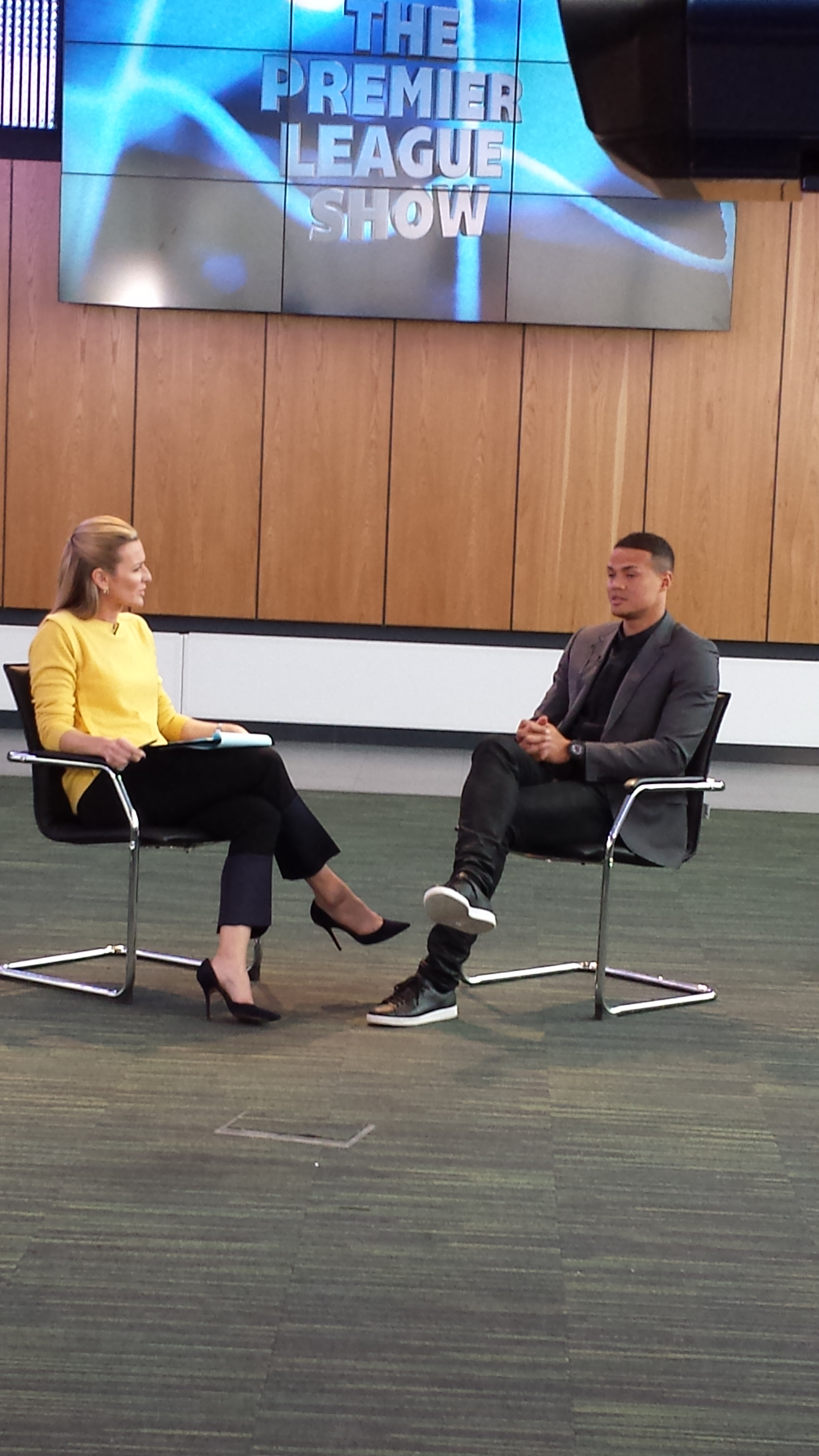
- Gabby Logan and Jermaine Jenas hosting The Premier League Show at the National Football Museum
- Presented by: Gabby Logan; Gary Lineker
- Opening theme: "Wall of Glass" by Liam Gallagher
- Ending theme: "Wall of Glass" by Liam Gallagher
- Country of origin: United Kingdom
- Original language: English
- No. of seasons: 3
- No. of episodes: 69

Production
- Production locations: National Football Museum, Manchester; Simmons Bars, London; Turkey Cafe, Leicester; Various Premier League training grounds
- Running time: 29 minutes
- Production companies: BBC Sport; Goalhanger Films

Original release
- Network: BBC Two
- Release: 25 August 2016 – 9 May 2019

Related
- Final Score; Football Focus; Match of the Day; Match of the Day 2

The Premier League Show is a BBC magazine television show focusing on the Premier League.

The programme started broadcasting during the 2016–17 Premier League season and ran up to the end of 2018–19, it was succeeded by MOTDx from 2019–20.

== Interviews and features ==
Each edition of The Premier League Show features either an interview with a key football figure or a look at a prominent football story.

Examples have included:

- Steve Bower, Dion Dublin, Jermaine Jenas, Gary Lineker, Gabby Logan, Trevor Sinclair, and Dan Walker conducting one-to-one interviews with Rafael Benítez, Slaven Bilić, Petr Čech, Paul Clement, Antonio Conte, Kevin De Bruyne, Didier Drogba, Sean Dyche, Cesc Fàbregas, Darren Fletcher, Pep Guardiola, Joe Hart, Eddie Howe, Mark Hughes, Jürgen Klopp, Ronald Koeman, Juan Mata, José Mourinho, David Moyes, Mark Noble, Alan Pardew, Mauricio Pochettino, Kasper Schmeichel, Craig Shakespeare, Raheem Sterling, Jamie Vardy, and David Wagner.
- Matthew Syed examining the rivalry between Pep Guardiola and José Mourinho.
- Gabby Logan chairing a discussion to reflect on Arsène Wenger's 20 years as Arsenal manager. She was joined by former Arsenal players John Hartson, Martin Keown, and Ian Wright, plus journalist Amy Lawrence and supporter Piers Morgan.
- Gary Lineker travelling to New York to see how the Premier League is covered by the broadcast media in the United States, and viewed by the American public. He visited New York City FC, interviewed Frank Lampard and Patrick Vieira, and chatted to Andrea Pirlo and David Villa.
- Gabby Logan travelled to the North East to look at the history and current state of football in the region. She was joined by former players Colin Cooper, Michael Gray, and Alan Shearer, as well as North East journalist Simon Bird and local author John Nicholson.
- Matthew Syed analysing the mentality behind Leicester City's 2016-2017 season.
- Gabby Logan chairing a discussion ahead of the Merseyside derby. She was joined by former players Mark Lawrenson and Peter Reid, boxer Tony Bellew, and journalist David Prentice.
- Gabby Logan chairing a discussion ahead of the North London derby. The panel consisted of players Jermaine Jenas and Alex Scott, former Tottenham chair Lord Sugar, and chief football writer John Cross.
