= Match of the Day (American TV series) =

NBCSN soccer television program

- Country of origin: United States
- Original language: English
- No. of seasons: 3

Production
- Running time: 60–120 minutes

Original release
- Network: NBCSN
- Release: August 17, 2013 – 2016

Related
- Match of the Day

Match of the Day was a program that aired on the now defunct NBCSN. The show, based on the BBC version also titled Match of the Day, featured highlights of the day's Premier League action most Saturdays. A sister program, Match of the Day II, which also bears the same name as its BBC counterpart, highlighted the Sunday fixtures. The show was hosted by Rebecca Lowe and featured analysis by Robbie Earle, Robbie Mustoe and Kyle Martino, as well as contributions by the UK counterpart's respective host and commentator Gary Lineker, Steve Bower, and Neil Ashton.
