= How Do They Do That? =

British television series

How Do They Do That? is a British television show, produced by Lorimar-Telepictures and Reg Grundy Productions in and broadcast on BBC1 from 25 January 1994 to 23 April 1997. Originally presented by Jenny Hull and Des Lynam, the show explored feats of engineering, organization, and special effects. Each season opened with a stunt apparently performed by one of the presenters, such as a skydiver crash-landing into the studio, a car chase, or the entire studio being washed away.

After two series, Eamonn Holmes took over as male presenter, and from Series 5, was joined by Esther McVey. At its height, How Do They Do That? had 12 million viewers watching on Wednesday nights.

== Transmission guide ==
- Series 1: 13 editions from 25 January – 26 April 1994 (45 minutes)
- Series 1 compilation: 1 edition from 2 November 1994 (45 minutes)
- Series 2: 17 editions from 9 November 1994 – 1 March 1995 (45 minutes)
- Series 1 & 2 compilations: 6 editions from 20 July – 17 August 1995 (30 minutes)
- Series 3: 9 editions from 13 September – 8 November 1995 (45 minutes)
- Series 4: 9 editions from 24 January – 20 March 1996 (50 minutes)
- Series 5: 17 editions from 23 October 1996 – 23 April 1997 (50 minutes, final 4 editions 30 minutes)
