= Trans World Sport =

- current logo
- Genre: Sport
- Created by: Mark McCormack
- Country of origin: United Kingdom
- Original language: English

Production
- Running time: 49 minutes
- Production company: IMG Media

Original release
- Network: Channel 4
- Release: 27 May 1987 – 31 December 2025

Trans World Sport (TWS), originally stylised Transworld Sport (still used in some television listings and electronic program guides), was a sports-orientated television programme produced by IMG Media in London, England. It was shown worldwide, on a variety of syndicated television channels. It was the world's longest running weekly international television sports programme, and had been in continuous production every week from 5 May 1987; 39 years ago to 31 December 2025. It was shown in over fifty countries, with a household reach of nearly two-hundred million. Trans World Sport has brought coverage of many events, together with off-beat and esoteric stories from the world of sport.

The show was the idea of IMG founder Mark McCormack. Trans World Sport have had features on a variety of sports stars, including a sixteen-year-old Carlos Alcaraz, a fourteen-year-old Tiger Woods, a teenage Virat Kohli, Usain Bolt, and Roger Federer, and on a twelve-year-old Venus Williams, and her eleven-year-old sister Serena.

Trans World Sport covered numerous different sports, and filmed with many World and Olympic champions. Out of the 203 International Olympic Committee (IOC) member nations, the show visited 183 of them; including North Korea and Papua New Guinea.

The first show was narrated by Gerald Sinstadt. After a succession of different narrators in the early 1990s, the show settled on narrators, Sue Carpenter and Bruce Hammal.

On 26 December 2025, it was announced that the programme would end production at the end of the month, after thirty-eight years on the air.

== See also ==
- Mobil 1 The Grid
