= Sportsnight =

British television sports programme (1968–1997)

- Sportsnight title card, from 1983
- Also known as: Sportsnight with Coleman (1968–1972)
- Genre: Sport highlights
- Created by: Paul Fox
- Presented by: David Coleman (1968–1972); Tony Gubba (1972–1975); Harry Carpenter (1975–1985); Steve Rider (1985–1991); Desmond Lynam (1991–1997)
- Theme music composer: Tony Hatch
- Opening theme: Sportsnight theme
- Country of origin: United Kingdom
- Original language: English

Production
- Production company: BBC Sport

Original release
- Network: BBC One
- Release: 12 September 1968 – 14 May 1997

Related
- Sportsview (1954–1968)

Sportsnight is a midweek BBC television sports programme that ran from 1968 until 1997.

== Sportsview ==
Sportsnight was a successor to Sportsview which started on 8 April 1954. Sportsview was devised by Paul Fox, later Controller of BBC1 and Peter Dimmock was the original host for a decade (and did host occasional editions from 1964 to 1968). The BBC Sports Personality of the Year award evolved as a spin-off from Sportsview when the last show of its inception year featured the Sports Review of 1954. Frank Bough took over as main host in 1964 and Sportsview was replaced by Sportsnight with Coleman from 12 September 1968. A junior version of Sportsview also ran from 1956 to 1962.

== Sportsnight ==
Sportsnight was originally shown on Thursday nights. The original presenter was David Coleman and the programme was billed as Sportsnight with Coleman. It moved to Wednesdays in 1973. The theme tune was composed by Tony Hatch.

The show broadcast many sports and acted as a midweek version of Grandstand, although it was only aired during the winter months. Almost all of its coverage was in highlights form, often focussing on midweek football action. The exception to this was boxing, which featured prominently in the programme from its inception until the early 1990s, when the top-of-the-bill fight from Wembley Arena or the Royal Albert Hall would be shown live shortly after the programme came on air. If the fight's duration was short, highlights of the undercard would then be shown but if the top-of-the-bill live fight went the distance, or close to the distance, highlights of the undercard would be shown on Grandstand the following Saturday. Other occasional live action included greyhound racing, namely the TV Trophy race each year, and on at least one occasion in the late 1970s or early 80s, live coverage of a darts match from the BDO World Darts Championship was shown when the night's scheduled FA Cup football match highlights were postponed due to bad weather. Pre-recorded features were also part of the programme.

The programme usually began after 10pm but in the final few years, the Sportsnight brand was used when the BBC was showing live European football during the peak viewing period.

The final edition of Sportsnight was broadcast on 14 May 1997, with live coverage of that year's UEFA Cup Winners' Cup Final.

== Regular hosts ==
- David Coleman (1968–1972)
- Tony Gubba (1972–1975)
- Harry Carpenter (1975–1985)
- Steve Rider (1985–1991)
- Desmond Lynam (1991–1997)
