= Holton, Oxfordshire =

Village in Oxfordshire, England

Coordinates: 51.756°N 1.137°W

Holton
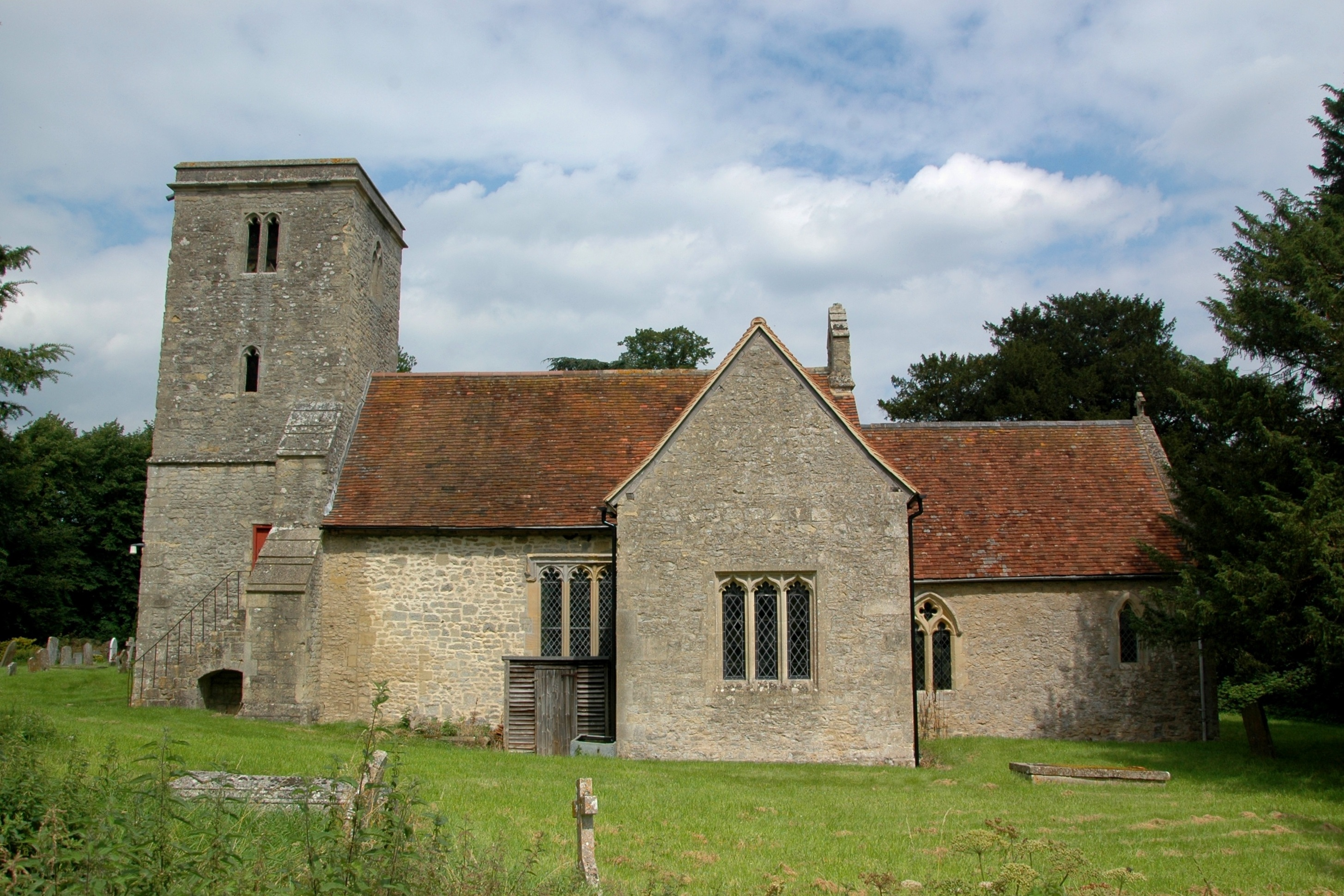
- St Bartholomew parish church

- Location within Oxfordshire
- Area: 6.63 km^{2} (2.56 sq mi)
- Population: 885 (2001 census)
  - Density: 133/km^{2} (340/sq mi)
- OS grid reference: SP6006
- Civil parish: Holton
- District: South Oxfordshire
- Shire county: Oxfordshire
- Region: South East
- Country: England
- Sovereign state: United Kingdom
- Post town: Oxford
- Postcode district: OX33
- Dialling code: 01865
- Police: Thames Valley
- Fire: Oxfordshire
- Ambulance: South Central
- UK Parliament: Henley and Thame
- Website: Holton Parish Council

Holton is a village and civil parish in South Oxfordshire about 5.5 miles (9 km) east of Oxford. The parish is bounded to the southeast by the River Thame, to the east and north by the Thame's tributary Holton Brook, to the south by London Road and to the west by field boundaries with the parishes of Forest Hill with Shotover and Stanton St John.

== Manor ==
Holton's toponym is derived from the Old English for "hidden nook". It is a Saxon village that was probably established in the 10th century. The Domesday Book records that in 1086 the Norman nobleman Roger d'Ivry was the manor of Holton's feudal overlord. In 1112 d'Ivry's last heir died and his estates passed to the Crown. The Crown granted Holton to the Saint Valery family, whereby it became part of the Honour of St Valery and later the Honour of Wallingford. By 1317 Holton had a manor house with a dovecote.

During the English Civil War the Whorwood family that owned the manor and lived in the house were Royalists but in 1643 it was held by a Parliamentarian garrison that controlled Wheatley Bridge across the River Thame. In January 1647 a Parliamentarian commander, Henry Ireton, and Bridget, a daughter of Oliver Cromwell, were married at the manor house. A new dovecote was built for the manor house in the 17th century and new stables were added in the 18th century. By 1801 the house was a mostly 17th century building with traces of 15th-century work. It was dilapidated and in 1805 it was demolished, but the stables, dovecote and moat of the old house all survive.

A new Georgian neo-Gothic house, Holton Park, was built by Elisha Biscoe in the deer park of the demolished manor house between 1808 and 1815. In 1948 the Oxfordshire Education Committee bought Holton Park house and turned it into a girls' grammar school. It is now Wheatley Park School.

== Parish church ==
The Church of England parish church of Saint Bartholomew was built in about 1200. It is cruciform and is in the transitional style between Norman architecture and Early English Gothic. Early in the 14th century its chancel was rebuilt and given a Decorated Gothic east window. The Gothic Revival architect E.G. Bruton built the rectory in 1882. St. Bartholomew's parish is now part of a single Church of England benefice with St. Mary's parish, Wheatley and the benefice is part of a local ecumenical partnership with Wheatley's Roman Catholic, United Reformed and free churches.

== Economic and social history ==
The Domesday Book records that by 1086 Holton had a water mill. This may have been on the River Thame. The present mill is 17th century and is on the Thame 550 yards (500 m) upstream of Wheatley Bridge. Lyehill Quarry in the west of the parish belonged to Holton Manor. It was in use by the early part of the 15th century, when it supplied limestone for the building of Thomas Wolsey's Cardinal's College in Oxford.

In 1684 Rev. Edward Rogers, Rector of Holton, died leaving £200 to be invested to provide an income to educate poor children of Holton. In 1787 classes were held in the Kings' Arms public house in Wheatley but by 1790 Holton had a purpose-built schoolhouse. It was run by the same schoolmaster, John Sawyer, from then until 1821, by which time he was so incompetent, old and deaf that he had lost all his pupils. The school was empty from then until it reopened with a new master in 1824. In 1833 it was only a boys' school but in 1835 a girls' and infants' school was opened. The two schools were merged by 1854 and the old building was demolished and replaced in 1861. Early in the 20th century pupil numbers declined and in 1915 the Oxfordshire Education Committee closed the school.

During the Second World War a United States military hospital was built in Holton Park. The Lady Spencer-Churchill College of Education was built at Holton in 1966 and merged with Oxford Polytechnic in 1974. In 1992 the polytechnic became Oxford Brookes University. The former Lady Spencer-Churchill College is now Oxford Brookes' Wheatley Campus.

== Sources ==
- Lobel, Mary D, ed. (1957). "Holton". A History of the County of Oxford. Victoria County History. Vol. 5: Bullingdon Hundred. pp. 168–177.
- Sherwood, Jennifer; Pevsner, Nikolaus (1974). Oxfordshire. The Buildings of England. Harmondsworth: Penguin Books. pp. 649–650. ISBN 0-14-071045-0.
