= Gerald Sinstadt =

English sports commentator and newspaper columnist (1930–2021)

- Born: Gerald Morris Sinstadt; 19 February 1930; Folkestone, Kent, England
- Died: 10 November 2021 (aged 91)
- Occupation(s): Commentator, columnist

Gerald Morris Sinstadt (19 February 1930 – 10 November 2021) was an English sports commentator, broadcaster and newspaper columnist.

== Early life ==
Born in Folkestone, Kent, Sinstadt attended The Harvey Grammar School.

== Broadcasting career ==
Sinstadt began broadcasting on the British Forces Broadcasting Service in October 1949 and BBC Radio in the 1950s and 1960s – where he was deputy head of sport to Angus Mackay. Whilst at BFBS he met a young 2nd Lieutenant doing his national service, by the name of Barry Davies, who was keen to try his hand at sports broadcasting. Upon their return to the UK Sinstadt helped Davies to get a foothold in BBC Radio. Sinstadt moved into television in the mid-1960s with Anglia Television.

From 1969 to 1981, he was the main football commentator/presenter for Granada Television in North West England, replacing Davies who had moved to the BBC. He presented the Friday evening Granada football magazine preview show Kick Off and then over the weekend commentated on matches, usually involving Liverpool, Manchester City, Everton and Manchester United which from 1975 until he left were broadcast in The Kick Off Match, Granada's regional variation of ITV's The Big Match. He also covered numerous other clubs such as Blackpool, Bolton Wanderers and Preston North End.

He often commentated nationally on European matches involving north-west clubs, including Manchester United's victory over Ajax in the 1976–77 UEFA Cup and Liverpool's defeat of Saint Etienne in the same season's European Cup.

Sinstadt covered four World Cups for ITV, from 1970 in Mexico to 1982 in Spain. The matches he covered included the live 1978 third-place play-off between Brazil and Italy and the 1982 semi-final between France and West Germany. He was also part of the ITV team at the European Championships in Italy in 1980. Sinstadt was ITV's number three commentator behind Brian Moore and Hugh Johns, covering the UEFA Cup finals in 1974 and 1976, The 1974 European Cup Final Replay and the 1978 League Cup Final replay between Nottingham Forest and Liverpool in 1978.

During his ITV years he commentated on other sports, including all ball games at the 1972 Munich Olympics, snooker, golf and cricket.

Sinstadt left Granada after the 1980–81 season, with his place being taken by Martin Tyler. As well as producing opera programmes, from the beginning of 1982 until the end of the 1982–83 season Sinstadt commentated for TVS. The region had First Division clubs Southampton and Brighton and Hove Albion.

In September 1976, he also presented World of Sport, covering for regular presenter Dickie Davies who was on holiday on the 18 September edition, which led to Gordon Burns covering the presenter and commentator roles on both Kick Off and The Kick Off Match.

Subsequently, he commentated on golf for Channel 4. He rejoined the BBC in the mid-1980s, working as a reporter and commentator for Football Focus and Match of the Day. He also covered other sports such as rowing, including commentating on some of the Steve Redgrave/Matthew Pinsent Olympic successes and covering the Oxford and Cambridge Boat Race in the early 1990s. For the latter he succeeded Harry Carpenter but was later replaced by Barry Davies. While at the BBC, he presented episodes of a BBC2 documentary series Football Fussball Voetbal, a history of European football leading up to Euro 96.

He appeared in the Jimmy McGovern television docu-drama Hillsborough (1996), about the football tragedy, having been a BBC television reporter at the stadium while the disaster unfolded seven years earlier. In 1987, he was the first to voice the long-running Trans World Sport.

In the 2000s, Sinstadt continued to report from football grounds for BBC Sport's Final Score programme, broadcast on Saturday afternoons on BBC One and the BBC's interactive digital service. On 22 January 2011 he voiced a short obituary for former Bolton Wanderers and England forward Nat Lofthouse at the end of the BBC's Football Focus programme, and on 16 March 2013 he did the same following the death of his former BBC colleague Tony Gubba.

== Writing ==
As of 2014, Sinstadt wrote a weekly column for The Sentinel newspaper in Staffordshire, reflecting on football and other sports. An author of three published novels in the 1960s, he remained an avid reader and posted book reviews on the Goodreads website and as a Vine Voice on the Amazon website under the name of GS-trentham.

== Personal life ==
Sinstadt lived in Stoke-on-Trent and remained actively involved in football, as a Staffordshire member of the FA Council and as vice-chairman of the North Staffordshire Youth League.

He died on 10 November 2021, aged 91.
