= Steve Wilson (football commentator) =

British football commentator

- Born: 1967 (age 58–59)
- Occupation: football commentator
- Website: www.bbc.co.uk/blogs/stevewilson

Steve Wilson (born 1967) is a British television commentator for football matches who works on the BBC's Match of the Day programme.

== Early life and education ==
Wilson was born and brought up on the Wirral. He studied a degree in English at the University of Liverpool. He was present on the Leppings Lane terrace at the time of the Hillsborough disaster, in a less populated section. For the 20-year anniversary, he filmed a piece of his experiences for Football Focus.

== Career ==
=== Radio ===
After several years working for Capital Gold supporting Jonathan Pearce, Wilson moved to BBC Radio 5 Live in the summer of 1998. His first commentary for the network was the opening game of Celtic's title defence in Scotland – a 5–0 win over Dunfermline Athletic.

=== Match of the Day ===
During his first season with the network, Wilson's commentary opportunities were limited, but he impressed enough to be given several outings on Match of the Day. During the 1999–00 season Wilson's role on Five Live was significantly increased as he shared many more matches with the likes of John Murray, Ian Brown and Simon Brotherton. He also continued his occasional work on Match of the Day and, following Jon Champion's move to ITV in 2001, Wilson became a permanent member of the Match of the Day team.

Because ITV held rights to Premier League highlights between 2001 and 2004, Match of the Day was more infrequent, covering mainly FA Cup and international matches, meaning Wilson was still able to continue commentating on Five Live during this period. Since the BBC regained the rights to Premier League highlights in 2004, Wilson has been an integral part of the commentary team, and in 2018 he commentated on his first FA Cup Final.

=== Writer ===
In 2015 Wilson wrote a history of football played during the Premier League era (1992–2015) entitled "Match of the Day 365", published by BBC Books.

Wilson’s obituary for former colleague John Motson was published in The Guardian in February 2023.

Between 2009 and 2012, he also wrote a regular blog for the BBC Sport website.

=== Controversy ===
In March 2023, Wilson and a few fellow BBC football commentators issued a joint statement in support of Match of the Day host Gary Lineker, who had been suspended by the BBC in a row over impartiality. The commentators pulled out of the Saturday March 11 Match of the Day episode, which subsequently aired with no presenters, pundits or commentary. https://www.theguardian.com/football/2023/mar/10/gary-lineker-step-back-match-of-the-day-bbc

In coverage of Germany against Brazil in the semi-finals of the 2014 FIFA World Cup, Wilson referred to the German national anthem by its former title of Deutschland Über Alles, which many Germans find offensive due to its former usage by Nazis. He apologized over Twitter for his mistake. The BBC received complaints on the issue, and stated "In referring to the German national anthem, commentator Steve Wilson made a genuine mistake which has been acknowledged, and we apologise for any offence caused."

== Personal life ==
Growing up, Wilson lived in walking distance of Prenton Park and became a fan of Tranmere Rovers FC. He now lives in West Sussex with his family.
