= Robyn Cowen =

English sports commentator

- Education: Wheatley Park School; Oxford Brookes University (BA (Hons))
- Occupation: Sports commentator

Robyn Cowen is an English journalist and football commentator. She was the lead commentator on BBC One for the England women's national football team matches during UEFA Women's Euro 2022, which was hosted and won by England.

== Early life ==
Cowen attended the state comprehensive Wheatley Park School in Oxford, before graduating from Oxford Brookes University in 2011 with a degree in law.

== Career ==
Cowen joined the BBC in 2011 as a sports reporter after a placement at BBC Radio Oxford. She joined BBC Radio 5 Live in 2014 and began on the commentary team for Match of the Day in 2018. She was a commentator for the BBC at the delayed UEFA Euro 2020. Cowen has had regular appearances on the Offside Rule podcast alongside Lynsey Hooper and Kait Borsay, as well as guest appearances on Guardian Football Weekly, and The Athletic’s Football Cliches show.

In July 2023, she was announced as a commentator for the BBC at the 2023 FIFA Women's World Cup.

Cowen is an Oxford United fan and co-hosts the BBC Sounds podcast The Dub, which focuses on the club.

== Recognition and reception ==
As a female commentator in a traditionally male-dominated industry, Cowen has remarked that whilst Jacqui Oatley had been a solo female voice as the first female commentator on Match of the Day, the presence of Vicki Sparks at the BBC at the same time as Cowen had made her feel "exceptionally lucky" because they had been able to share the "spotlight".

Former Match of the Day host Des Lynam described Cowen in The Daily Telegraph as having "an understated and light-hearted style [that] is easy on the ear." At the 2021 Football Supporters' Association Awards, Cowen was nominated in the 'Commentator of the Year' category alongside Martin Tyler, Peter Drury and Conor McNamara, amongst others.

Cowen's commentary of "Dream makers. Record breakers. Game changers", as England won Euro 2022 was described by veteran broadcaster Richard Keys as "brilliant. And perfect for the occasion." Cowen's commentary from the winning moment at the 2022 Euros final was used by BBC One during the New Year's Eve celebrations and fireworks after the Big Ben strikes at midnight into 1 January 2023.

In February 2023 Cowen was nominated in the Commentator category at the British Sports Journalism Awards. In November 2023, she was nominated in the Commentator of the Year category at the Football Supporters' Association awards.
