= Match of the Day =

British TV football series (since 1964)

- Also known as: MOTD
- Genre: Football highlights
- Created by: Bryan Cowgill
- Presented by: Kelly Cates; Mark Chapman; Gabby Logan
- Starring: Danny Murphy; Micah Richards; Alan Shearer
- Narrated by: Guy Mowbray; Steve Wilson; Steve Bower; Simon Brotherton; Jonathan Pearce; Conor McNamara
- Theme music composer: Barry Stoller
- Opening theme: Match of the Day theme
- Country of origin: United Kingdom
- Original language: English
- No. of series: 62
- No. of episodes: Over 5,000

Production
- Producer: Colm Harty
- Production locations: Studio TC5, BBC Television Centre (1964–2011) dock10 studios (2011–present)
- Editor: Richard Hughes
- Camera setup: Multi-camera
- Running time: Live: 150–210 minutes (Depends on Extra time or Penalties); Highlights: 60–105 minutes
- Production company: BBC Sport

Original release
- Network: BBC One (1966–present); BBC Two (1964–1966)
- Release: 22 August 1964 – present

Related
- Match of the Day 2; Match of the Day 2 Extra; Match of the Day 3; Match of the Day Kickabout; Match of the Day Live; Match of the Day Northern Ireland; Match of the Day Wales; Match of the Day (US); The Football League Show

Match of the Day (abbreviated to MOTD) is a men’s football highlights programme, typically broadcast on BBC One on Saturday nights during the Premier League season.

Match of the Day is one of the BBC's longest-running shows, having been on air since 22 August 1964. In 2015, Guinness World Records recognised it "as the longest-running football television programme in the world." It was later longest active running sports TV program anywhere in the world after Hockey Night in Canada stopped airing over-the-air in Canada. Analysis is currently provided by Danny Murphy, Micah Richards and Alan Shearer, among others. Former England striker Gary Lineker was the series' longest-serving presenter (1999–2025). From the 2004–05 season, a second programme, Match of the Day 2, has usually aired on a Sunday in the football season, featuring highlights of all the men’s games of the day, whilst showing the goals from the Saturday action.

The show's theme tune was voted the most recognised television theme in a 2010 poll conducted by the PRS.

== History ==
=== 1960s ===
Although the title was first used by the BBC for its Wimbledon tennis highlights programme in June 1964, the first football-related edition of Match of the Day was screened on BBC2 on 22 August 1964, and showed highlights of a game between Liverpool and Arsenal at Anfield. The programme's audience was estimated at only 20,000, less than half of the attendance at the ground.

Match of the Day was not universally welcomed in the football world; in 1965 several clubs attempted to block a renewed deal with the BBC in fear of a drop in gate attendances at matches. Eventually, a compromise was reached where the BBC agreed not to reveal which match was to be shown until after the day's play had concluded. Following the success of the England team at the 1966 FIFA World Cup, the programme was moved from BBC2 to BBC1 for the start of the 1966–1967 season. The first colour edition was shown on 2 November 1968, when the programme moved back to BBC2 for one week, and a game between Chelsea and Manchester City was featured (BBC 2 was transmitted on 625 lines capable of showing colour). Two other First Division games from the 1968–69 season were also broadcast on BBC2 in colour. The first colour edition of Match of the Day on BBC1 was shown on 15 November 1969, where it featured a game between Liverpool and West Ham United.

=== 1970s and 1980s ===
Slow motion replays were first introduced in 1969. At the end of the decade the BBC lost a significant share of matches, with a new four-year deal in 1979 splitting the rights between the BBC and ITV (ITV had originally won exclusive rights, but a ruling from the Office of Fair Trading ordered that the rights be split). Match of the Day was moved to Sunday afternoons for the 1980–81 and 1982–83 seasons.

In 1983, the programme reverted to being shown on Saturday night, although that year four broadcasts were lost due to industrial action. The season 1983–84 also saw the first Match of the Day Live broadcasts of First Division matches, beginning with Manchester United vs Tottenham Hotspur on 16 December – a Friday evening fixture. This came some two months after the start of ITV's Big Match Live.

=== 1990s and 2000s ===
League football highlights were not available to the BBC from 1988 as ITV had exclusive rights, though the programme remained on air for the FA Cup as Match of the Day: The Road to Wembley. League football returned in 1992, for the start of the Premier League era. Sky's emergence made the TV rights market more competitive, with the BBC losing European Cup matches after UEFA's revamping as the Champions League in 1992, although it did broadcast the 1994 final between A.C. Milan and FC Barcelona. In 1997, the BBC lost all live rights to the FA Cup meaning the programme's live coverage was restricted to the UEFA Cup and Cup Winners' Cup matches, the latter competition becoming defunct in 1999. The BBC were still able to show Saturday evening highlights of FA Cup games. A significant change occurred in 2001 when the Premier League awarded highlights rights to ITV in a three-year contract. Between 2001 and 2004, the Match of the Day brand was used for the BBC's live football coverage and the network had earned some consolation in losing by managing to regain live terrestrial coverage of the FA Cup and England internationals for that period.

Rights for UEFA Champions League qualifiers, which are held by the home team and fall outside the rights for the competition proper, were obtained on an ad hoc basis for English teams in this period, which is currently the case for the BBC with Scottish and Northern Irish teams. Both legs of Manchester United's 2002–03 third round qualifying matches against Zalaegerszeg were shown live on the BBC.

From the 2004–05 season, Premier League highlights returned to the BBC in a revived MOTD. In addition, Match of the Day 2 was launched, which showed highlights of the increasing number of Sunday fixtures, and was initially presented by Adrian Chiles. The BBC's broadcasting rights were renewed in 2009, allowing them to continue showing Match of the Day until 2013.

=== 2010s ===
From the 2011–12 season, a web-only Match of the Day 3 programme was launched on Monday mornings as a light-hearted addition to Match of the Day 2. Although broadcast as a separate programme, it is recorded immediately following the conclusion of Match of the Day 2 on Sunday night. In November 2011, Match of the Day moved from London to a brand new studio in Dock10, MediaCityUK as part of BBC Sport's relocation north, this allowed the programme to be recorded in high-definition. At the start of 2012–13 season Match of the Day 2 moved to BBC One.

Upon regaining the FA Cup rights in 2014, highlights from the early and later rounds of the competition were given their own separate programme instead of being broadcast on an extended Match of the Day straight after the Premier League highlights, as it was before the BBC last lost the rights in 2008. Highlights of the latter rounds occasionally sequence from the Premier League highlights, as they did until the previous decade, but both segments are considered separate programmes.

In January 2018, the Premier League awarded the UK highlights to BBC Sport. The rights cost £211.5 million and were to cover three seasons from 2019 to 2020. The January 2018 agreement also includes Match of the Day 2, Match of the Day 2 Extra, Match of the Day Kickabout, Football Focus, Final Score and The Premier League Show.

=== 2020s ===
During the COVID-19 pandemic and the postponement of the 2019–20 Premier League season, Match of the Day split into a televised podcast called Match of the Day: Top 10 Podcast in which Gary Lineker and the pundits discussed and ranked certain roles from the start of the Premier League in 1992 (such as Top 10 Goalkeepers) and Match of their Day which featured a pundit picking three of their favourite Premier League matches. Upon its resumption, the BBC broadcast four games live. Bournemouth versus Crystal Palace became the first Premier League game shown live on one of the five main terrestrial channels, and the BBC's first live top-flight English football match since 1987–88. A further eight games were shown live during the 2020–21 season.

In July 2022, the BBC acquired the rights to show highlights of the men's UEFA Champions League on television, iPlayer and digitally from the 2024–25 to 2026–27 seasons. As part of this, on 21 August 2024, the first episode of MOTD: UEFA Champions League aired on BBC One.

In March 2023, Lineker was suspended following political controversy over a tweet he had made criticising UK government policy, which the BBC argued breached guidelines over social media use by employees and freelancers. Several presenters, pundits and commentators, including Alex Scott, Ian Wright and Alan Shearer, refused to participate in the BBC's football output, while some football clubs announced their refusal to conduct BBC interviews. Radio and television programming across BBC Sport's football division was severely disrupted on 11 March, while BBC director general Tim Davie apologised to viewers for the disruption. Both Match of the Day and Match of the Day 2, presented the following day, followed a shortened format with no studio presentation, punditry, or interviews. On 13 March, Lineker was reinstated as host of Match of the Day and the BBC began a review of its social media guidelines.

At the end of 2023, the BBC and Premier League agreed on a deal whereby Premier League highlights will be shown on Match Of The Day, Match of the Day 2 and Football Focus up to and including the 2028–29 season. The deal also includes a significant increase in the amount of digital content that can be used across BBC Sport platforms.

In 2025, Gary Lineker ended his run as the longest-serving presenter of Match of the Day. His departure followed a petition, signed by over 10,000 individuals, calling for the BBC to remove him from his position due to controversial social media posts unrelated to football. Lineker stated that he was unaware his pro-Palestine activism on social media contained "antisemitic" content, but issued an apology in response to the controversy. BBC Director General Tim Davie noted in a statement, "Gary has acknowledged the mistake he made. Accordingly, we have agreed he will step back from further presenting after this season."

== Studio ==
The programme was broadcast from TC5 at BBC Television Centre from 1964 to 2012.

Ahead of the 2019–20 Premier League season, BBC Sport upgraded the studio that Match of the Day, Match of the Day 2, Football Focus and Final Score broadcasts from.

Filming is located at the Dock10 studios at MediaCityUK in Salford.

== Presenters, analysts and commentators ==
=== Presenters ===
Despite the programme's long running status there have been only five regular main presenters: Kenneth Wolstenholme (1964–1967), David Coleman (1967–1973), Jimmy Hill (1973–1988), Des Lynam (1988–1999) and Gary Lineker (1999–2025). Lineker had worked as an analyst during his predecessor Des Lynam's tenure.

In 2005, Celina Hinchcliffe became the first woman to present on the programme.

In November 2024, Gary Lineker announced that he would be departing the Premier League highlights edition shows at the end of the 2024–25 season.

In January 2025, the BBC announced that Kelly Cates, Mark Chapman and Gabby Logan would share the presenting of Match of the Day, Match of the Day 2 and Match of the Day: Champions League following Lineker's departure.

=== Analysts ===
Among the analysts featured during the 2024–25 season are Danny Murphy, Micah Richards and Alan Shearer.

Previous Match of the Day analysts include Jimmy Hill, Alan Hansen, Mark Lawrenson and Ian Wright.

=== Commentators ===
Match of the Day uses a selection of BBC and freelance commentators, including: Guy Mowbray, Steve Wilson, Jonathan Pearce, Steve Bower, Simon Brotherton, Conor McNamara, Vicki Sparks, Alistair Mann, Martin Fisher, Mark Scott, John Roder, Chris Wise, Robyn Cowen, Steven Wyeth, Tom Gayle, James Fielden and Ben Andrews.

In 2007, Jacqui Oatley became the first woman to commentate on the programme.

Previous commentators have included Walley Barnes, Frank Bough, David Coleman, Jon Champion, Barry Davies, Tony Gubba, Stuart Hall, John Motson, Alan Parry, Idwal Robling, Gerald Sinstadt, Clive Tyldesley, Alan Weeks and Kenneth Wolstenholme. As part of the show's 50th anniversary celebrations, Barry Davies returned to commentate.

=== Current presenters ===
* Denotes relief presenter

Presenter	Duration
Mark Chapman	2014–
Kelly Cates	2025–
Gabby Logan	2007–
*Alex Scott	2022–
*Kelly Somers	2020–
*Jason Mohammad	2014–
*Eilidh Barbour	2024–

=== Previous presenters ===
* Denotes relief presenter

Presenter	Duration
Gary Lineker	1999–2025
*Jermaine Jenas	2023–2024
*Dan Walker	2012–2021
*Ray Stubbs	1993–2009
Des Lynam	1988–1999
*David Icke	1982–1985
Bob Wilson	1976–1994
Jimmy Hill	1973–1988
David Coleman	1967–1973
*Frank Bough	1965–1972
Kenneth Wolstenholme	1964–1967

=== Current analysts ===
Analyst	Duration
Alan Shearer	2006–2009, 2009–
Martin Keown	2007–
Danny Murphy	2013–
Dion Dublin	2012–2013, 2018–
Shay Given	2018–
Stephen Warnock	2020–
Micah Richards	2021–
Wayne Rooney	2025–
Leon Osman	2021–
Ashley Williams	2021–
Fara Williams	2023–
Glenn Murray	2023–
Joe Hart	2024–
Theo Walcott	2024–
Steph Houghton	2024–

=== Previous analysts ===
List includes both full time regular analysts and guests.

Analyst	Duration
Ian Wright	2002–2008, 2017–2024
Chris Waddle	2021
Karen Carney	2020–2021
Clinton Morrison	2020
Tim Cahill	2019–2020
Alex Scott	2019–2021
Matthew Upson	2018–2019
Frank Lampard	2017, 2018
Mark Schwarzer	2016–2017
Trevor Sinclair	2016–2017
Chris Sutton	2016–2017, 2020
Sam Allardyce	2015, 2017
Tony Pulis	2014
Jimmy-Floyd Hasselbaink	2014
Brad Friedel	2014
Paul Ince	2014, 2018
Dietmar Hamann	2014–2017
Neil Lennon	2014
Roberto Martinez	2013
Les Ferdinand	2013
Roy Hodgson	2013, 2016
Michael Owen	2013
David Moyes	2013, 2016
Kevin Kilbane	2013–2019
Robbie Fowler	2013–2015
Phil Neville	2012–2020
Vincent Kompany	2012
Harry Redknapp	2012, 2013
Marcel Desailly	2007
Gavin Peacock	2006–2008
Lee Dixon	2005–2012
Graeme Le Saux	2005–2006, 2016–2017
Peter Schmeichel	2004–2005
David O'Leary	2002
Mick McCarthy	2001, 2012
Mark Bright	2000, 2007
Ruud Gullit	1997, 2014–2017
Mark Lawrenson	1997–2018
Garth Crooks	1996, 2005, 2012
Alan Hansen	1992–2014
Jimmy Hill	1994–1997
David Baddiel	1994
Frank Skinner	1994
Mick Mills	1993
Ray Wilkins	1992
Lee Chapman	1992
Trevor Brooking	1992–2001
Danny Blanchflower	1964

Main Presenters and Analysts gallery

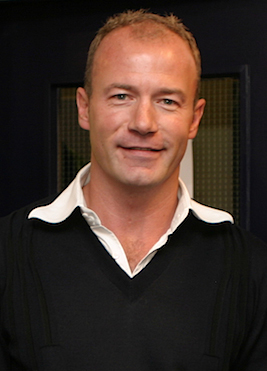
Alan Shearer (2006–2009, 2009–present)

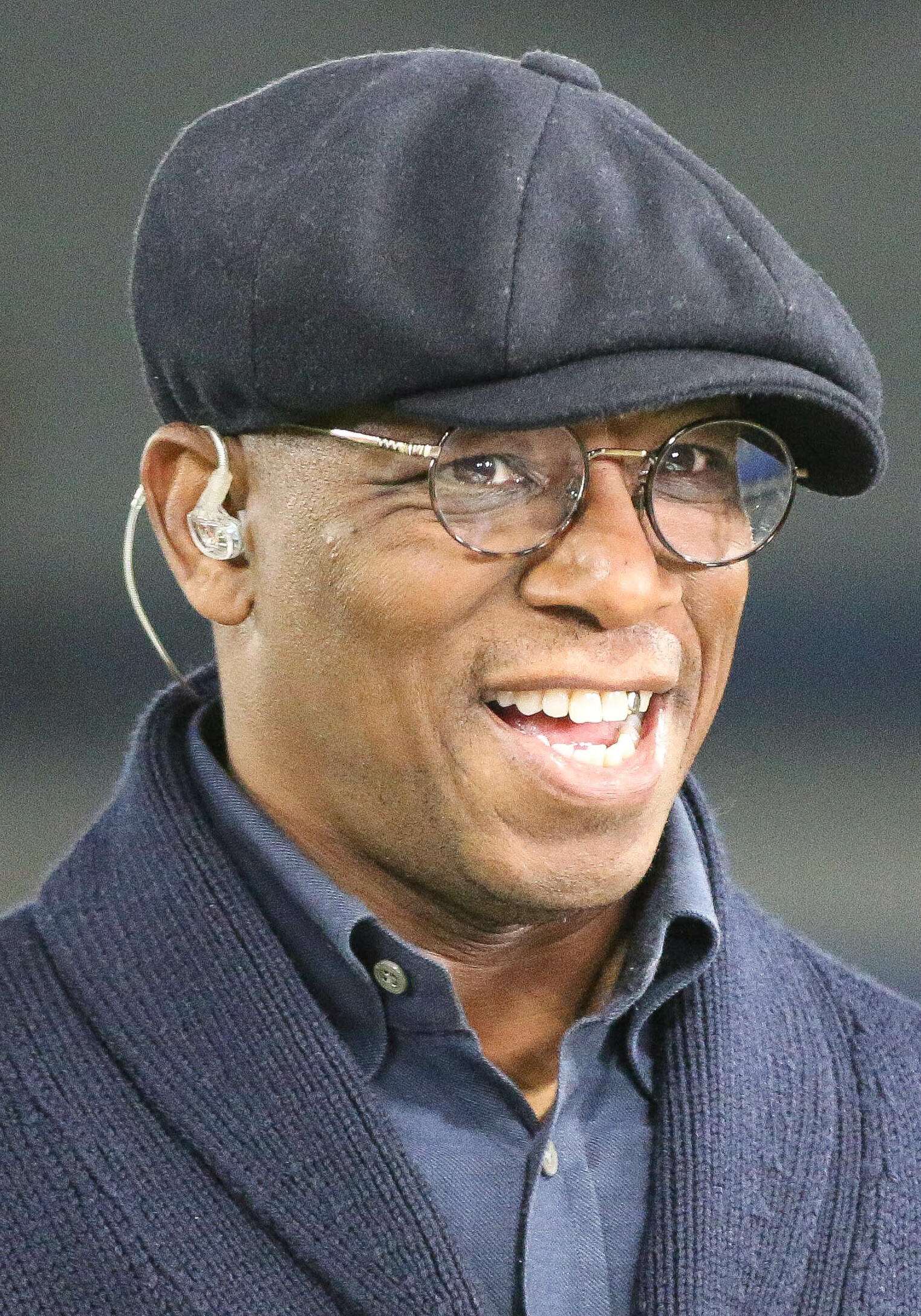
Ian Wright (2002–2008, 2017–2024)

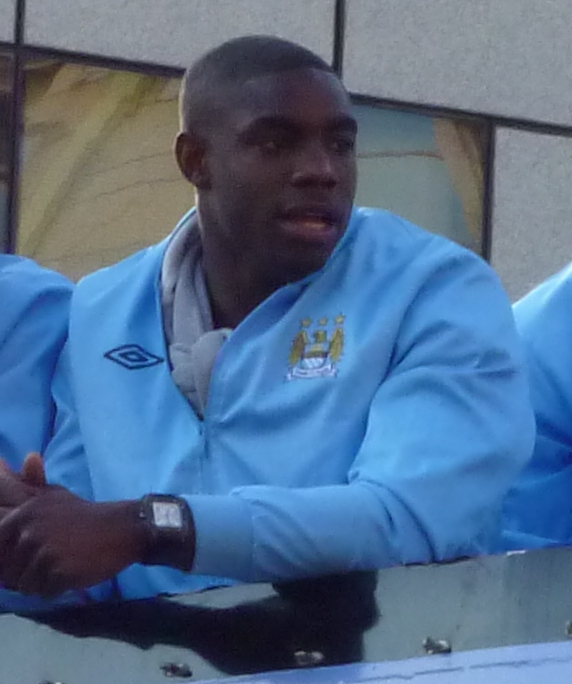
Micah Richards (2021–present)

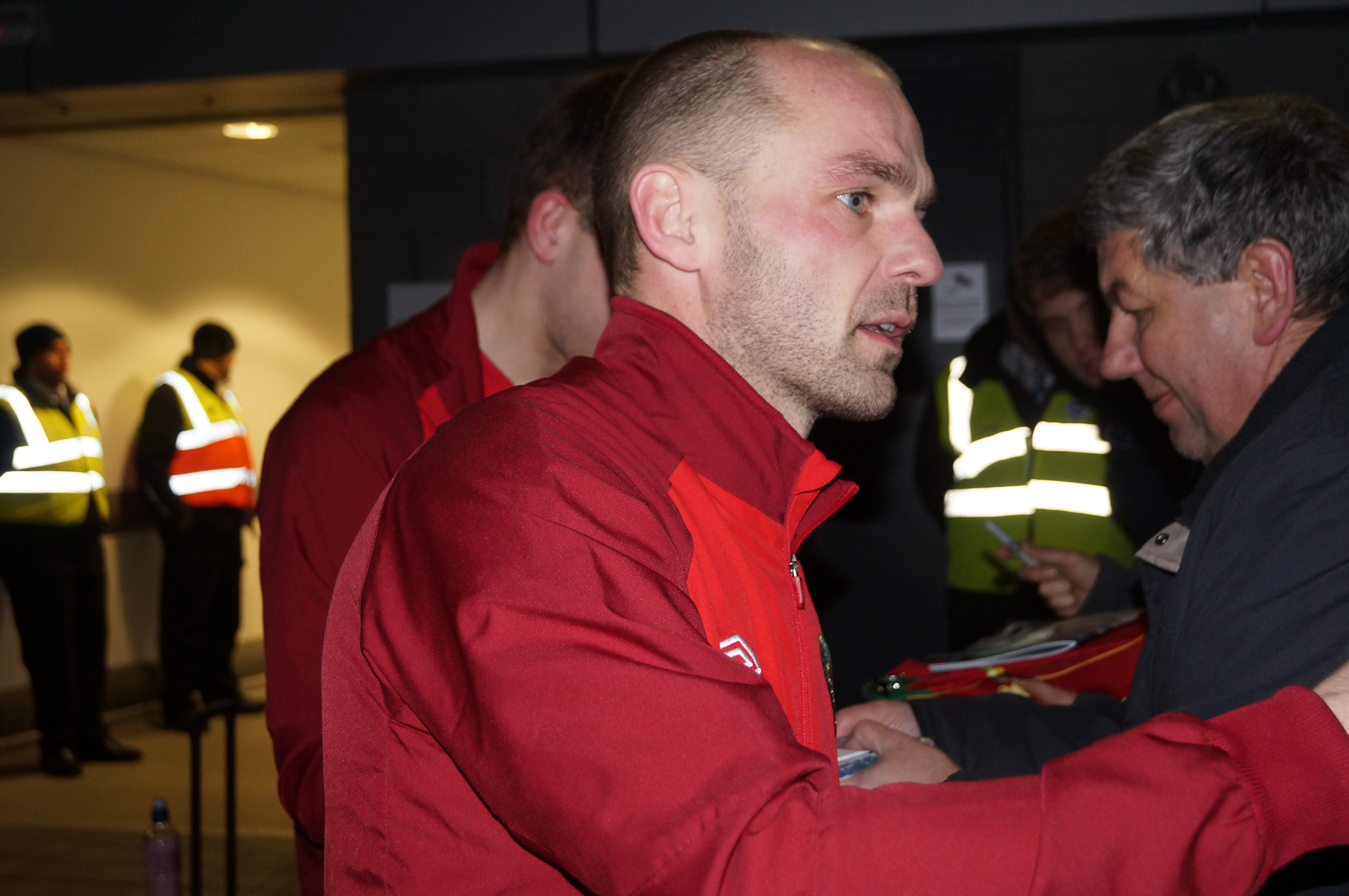
Danny Murphy (2013–present)

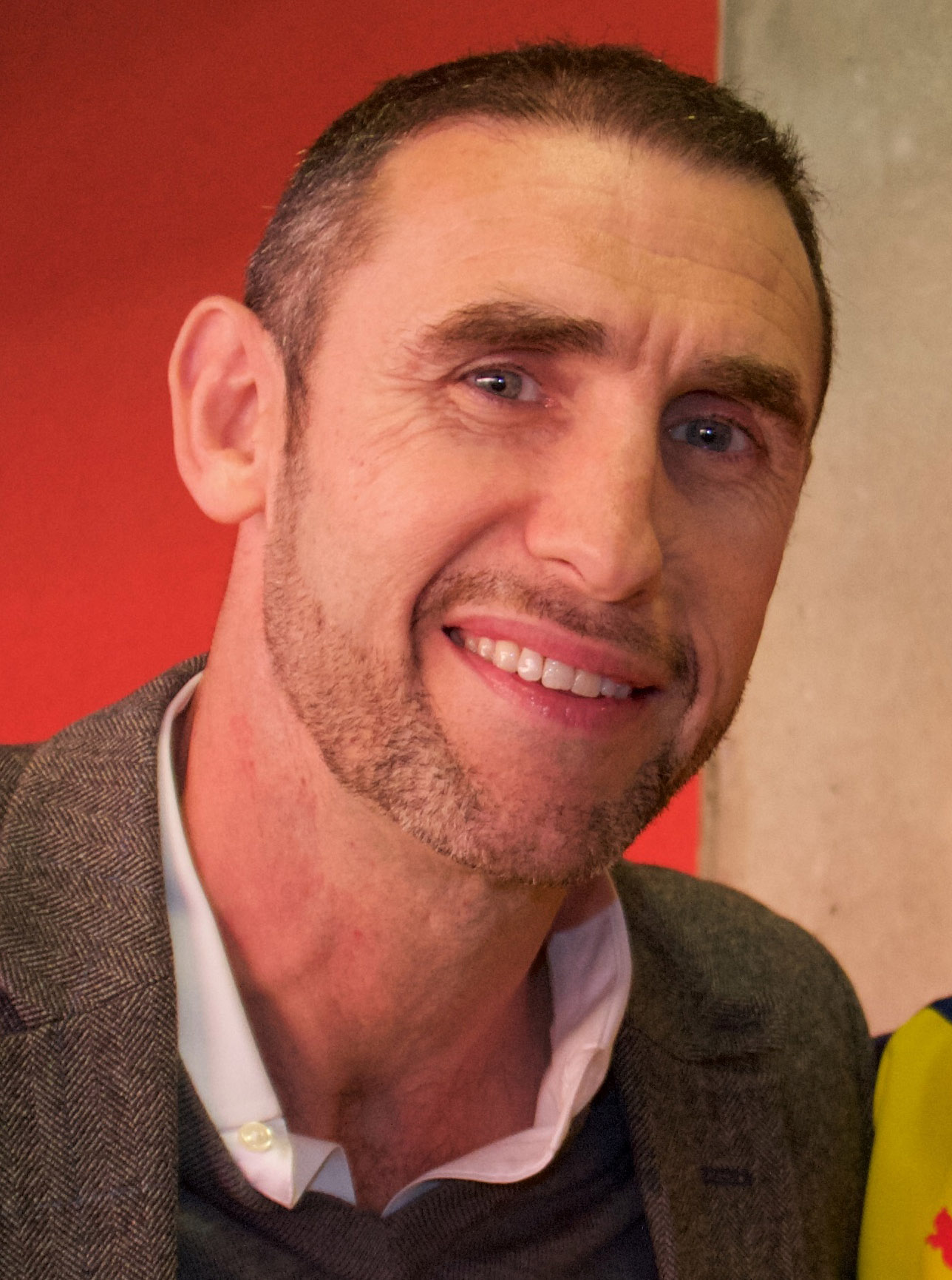
Martin Keown (2007–present)

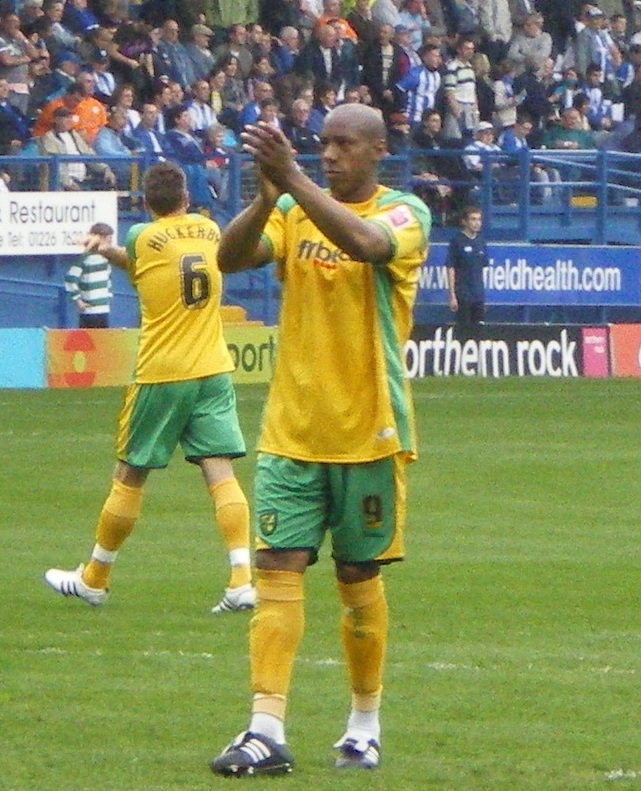
Dion Dublin (2012–2013, 2018–)

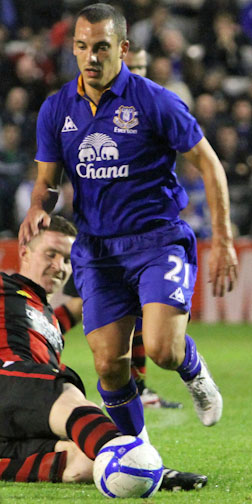
Leon Osman (2021–present)

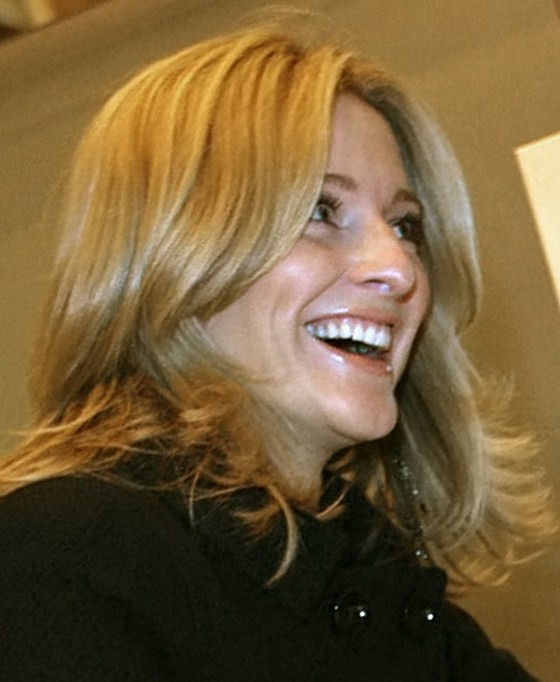
Gabby Logan (2007–present)

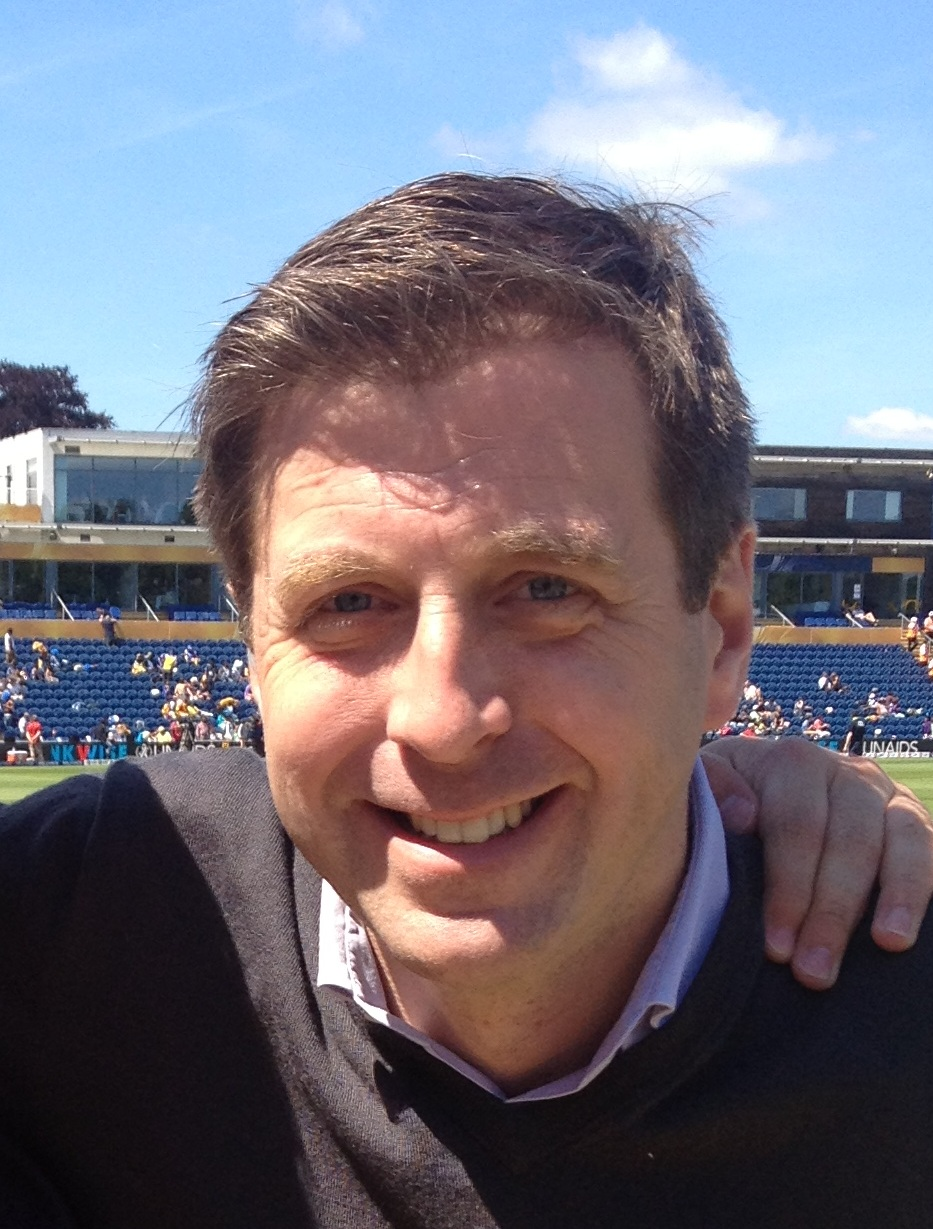
Mark Chapman (2014–present)

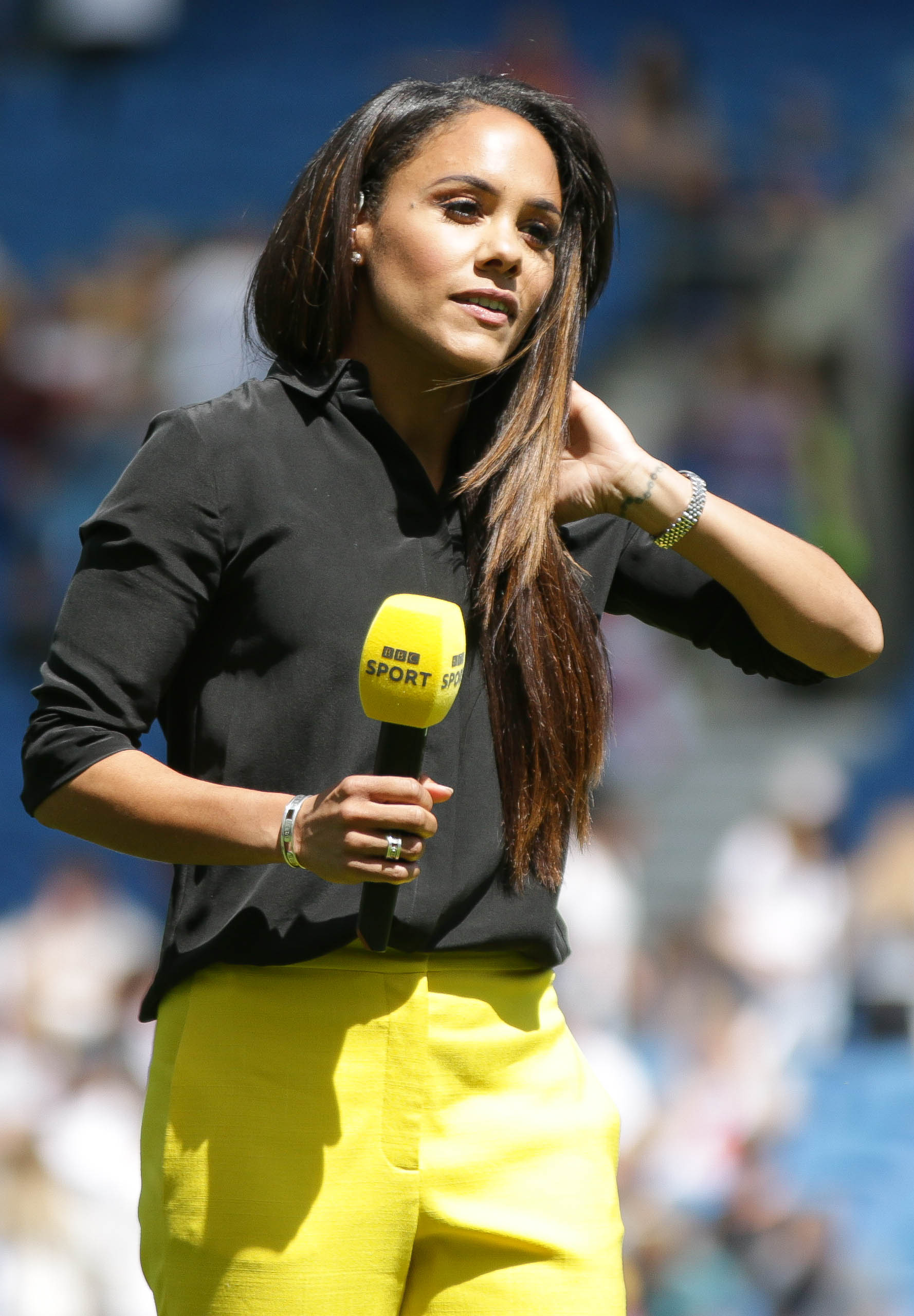
Alex Scott (2022–present)

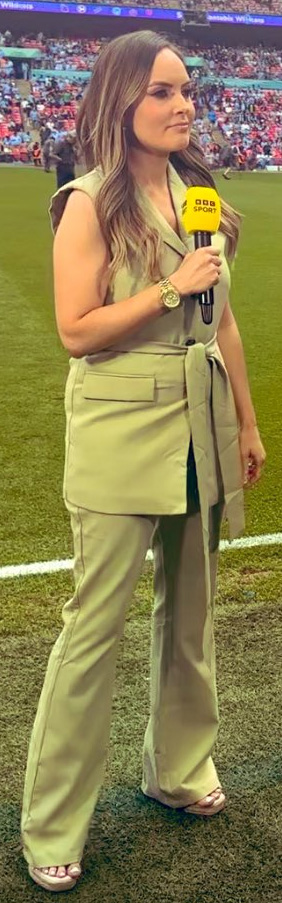
Kelly Somers (2020–present)

== Theme music ==
The current theme tune for the series is titled "Match of the Day". It was composed for the programme in 1970 by Barry Stoller, and was used for the first time on 15 August 1970.

Stoller's brief was simply to write "something good"; the short closing fanfare occurred to him first. "Those fanfare harmonies give the music a gladiator feel," he wrote in 2014, "akin to entering the ancient games arena in Rome with all its expectations." The tune was recorded by him, a trumpeter and a drummer (Stuart Vincent) in the basement recording studio of his home. In May 2010, PRS for Music revealed that the Match of the Day theme tune is the most recognisable in the UK.

The theme is often incorrectly labelled "Off Side", the group name used by musician Mike Vickers, for an alternative 1970 version of Stoller's tune, which was released as a 45 rpm gramophone single on the Pye label (7N 25534),

The original theme tune, entitled "Drum Majorette", was written by Major Leslie Statham, a former band member of the Welsh Guards under the pen-name Arnold Steck.

== Related shows ==
- Since 1998, the BBC's coverages of the FIFA World Cup and the UEFA European Championship have been under the Match of the Day banner.
- Between 1995 and 1999, the BBC broadcast Match of the Seventies (1995–96), Match of the Eighties (1997) and Match of the Nineties (1999). Each series acted as a chronological review of seasons through each decade, presented in a slightly off-beat style, and relied heavily on footage originally included in Match of the Day broadcasts. Presenters included Dennis Waterman, Danny Baker, Mark Radcliffe and Marc Riley.
- From the 2004–05 season, a second programme, Match of the Day 2, usually airs on the following Sunday.
- From the 2009–10 season until 2015–16, the BBC picked up the rights for the Football League highlights and up until 2011–12, ten live Championship games and three live League Cup games. Live games were broadcast under the Match of the Day Live banner, but highlights were shown on a new dedicated programme named The Football League Show (or, for League Cup games, The League Cup Show).
- From the 2013–14 season, American channel NBCSN has broadcast its own version also called Match of the Day.
- From the 2016–17 season until the 2018–19 season, The Premier League Show typically airs on Thursday nights during the Premier League season.
- From the 2019–20 season, a spin-off show MOTDx was launched, focussing on celebrities, music, fashion and culture of the Premier League. It is presented by Jermaine Jenas, alongside Chelcee Grimes, Craig Mitch and Reece Parkinson.

== Match of the Day Annual ==
A Match of the Day Annual book is also produced, along with a line of children's comics which tells of the most recent results and transfers in mostly English football.

== See also ==
- The Big Match
