= Match of the Day 2 =

Television series

- Title card
- Also known as: MOTD2
- Genre: Sport highlights
- Presented by: Mark Chapman (2013–2025); Colin Murray (2010–2013); Adrian Chiles (2004–2010)
- Starring: Predominant analysts: (2022–2023 season); Tim Cahill; Dion Dublin; Jermaine Jenas; Martin Keown; Danny Murphy; Micah Richards; Alan Shearer; Shay Given; Ian Wright
- Theme music composer: Barry Stoller
- Opening theme: Match of the Day theme
- Country of origin: United Kingdom
- Original language: English
- No. of episodes: 652

Production
- Producer: Rotating
- Production location: dock10 studios
- Editor: Jamie Gavin
- Camera setup: Multi-camera
- Running time: 45–90 minutes
- Production company: BBC Sport

Original release
- Network: BBC One (2012–2025); BBC Two (2004–2012)
- Release: 15 August 2004 – 18 May 2025

Related
- Match of the Day; Match of the Day 2 Extra; Match of the Day 3; Match of the Day II (US)

Match of the Day 2 is a Premier League football highlights programme, broadcast from August 2004 until May 2025. It was a companion show to Match of the Day, usually broadcast on BBC One on Sunday evenings, thus facilitating coverage of the respective week's Premier League matches that were played since the broadcast of the initial programme.

At the start of the 2025/26 Premier League season, the show was rebranded to be under the main Match of the Day branding.

== Format ==
Match of the Day 2 followed the same format as Match of the Day, with highlights of the day's Premier League football, followed by post-match interviews and tactical analysis.

The show originally featured a "Top 5" countdown based around a current event or a guest analyst on the show, such as "Worst Haircuts", "Shocking Refereeing Decisions", or "Golden Oldies." This was replaced by "2 Good, 2 Bad", which offered a humorous look at the goings on of the football weekend in England, such as embarrassing gaffes, unusual celebrations, intimacy between players and managers, or supporters falling asleep.

== Studio ==
Ahead of the 2019–20 Premier League season BBC Sport upgraded the studio that Match of the Day, Match of the Day 2, Football Focus, and Final Score broadcasts from.

The facility uses a "4K UHD ready virtual reality studio" and uses Epic Games' Unreal Engine 4 rendering technology.

The studio is located at dock10 studios, MediaCityUK.

== Scheduling ==
From the beginning of the 2012–13 season, Match of the Day 2 moved from BBC Two to BBC One. The BBC stated this was because "of the increased number of Premier League games played on a Sunday."

Occasionally, Match of the Day 2 either switches back to BBC Two or moves its broadcast time, to make way for other sporting events. These have included the Super Bowl, the Augusta Masters Golf Tournament, and the World Snooker Championships. On other occasions, Match of the Day 2 has been delayed to Monday night to cover a particular fixture that took place that on the Monday evening. During final weekend of Premier League season all 20 teams play their matches on Sunday at the same time with BBC's highlights programme on that Sunday evening for the final round of fixtures dropping the number 2 from its name and simply being referred to Match of the Day.

== Presenters and analysts ==
Mark Chapman serves as the predominant presenter.

In January 2025, the BBC announced changes to the presenting of Match of the Day, Match of the Day 2, and Match of the Day: Champions League following Gary Lineker's departure from Match of the Day at the end of the 2024–25 season. The announcement said that Kelly Cates, Mark Chapman, and Gabby Logan would share the presenting of all 3 programmes.

Among those providing analysis during the 2024–25 season have been Shay Given, Joe Hart, Steph Houghton, Glenn Murray, Theo Walcott, and Fara Williams, among others.

== Premier League licensing ==
=== 2019–20 to 2021–22 seasons ===
In January 2018, the Premier League announced that it had awarded the UK highlights to BBC Sport. The rights package cost £211.5 million and covers three seasons from 2019 to 2020.

The January 2018 agreement also includes Match of the Day, Match of the Day 2 Extra, Match of the Day Kickabout, Football Focus, Final Score, and The Premier League Show.
