= Tony Gubba =

English journalist and television sports commentator

- Born: David Anthony Gubba; 23 September 1943; Manchester, England
- Died: 11 March 2013 (aged 69)
- Occupations: Newspaper reporter, journalist, sports commentator

David Anthony Gubba (23 September 1943 – 11 March 2013) was an English journalist and television sports commentator.

== Life and career ==
Born in Manchester, Gubba was educated at Blackpool Grammar School. He began work as a local newspaper reporter with the Cyril Briggs Press Agency in Warrington, contracted to work on the Lymm edition of the Cheshire Country Express newspapers, before moving up to the job of staff reporter for the Daily Mirror. He later worked at Southern TV in Southampton.

=== BBC ===
Gubba joined the BBC as a sports correspondent, based in Liverpool. His first Olympic Games as a commentator with the BBC was in 1972, and he covered every World Cup tournament from 1974 to 2006. In 1972, he was given the job of presenting Sportsnight, a post he held until 1975.

After leaving Sportsnight, Gubba moved on to commentate on a range of sports for the BBC. He made regular appearances on Match of the Day, acted as stand-in presenter on Grandstand and the occasional return to Sportsnight, live international football matches and FA Cup matches. This was the era when John Motson and Barry Davies were the BBC's senior commentators so Gubba rarely got to commentate on games at the highest level, but notable matches he covered were the 1986 World Cup semi-final between France and West Germany, the 1992 Olympic Final, and the 1996 Charity Shield.

He also commentated on ice-skating, hockey, table tennis, bobsleigh, ski jumping, speed skating, cycling, rowing, judo, golf and tennis and was the main presenter of the BBC's coverage of the World Darts Championship from 1984 to 1990 and the 1987 Cricket World Cup.

Gubba spent 40 seasons as a football commentator, overtaking Barry Davies as the third-longest serving football commentator on British television after John Motson and Gerald Sinstadt. He listed witnessing the debuts of George Best for Manchester United and Michael Owen for Liverpool as highlights of his career.

He also provided commentaries for football video games: the PC version for FIFA International Soccer and the Nintendo 64 game International Superstar Soccer 98.

=== ITV ===
Gubba commentated on eight series of ITV's Dancing on Ice from 2006 to 2013. He provided a round-up of the performances and trivia about the celebrities and their skating partners. His last Dancing on Ice commentary was heard on 17 February 2013.

== Personal life ==
Gubba lived in Sonning-on-Thames, near Reading, Berkshire, with his partner of 15 years, Jenny. He had two daughters from his previous marriage.

He died on 11 March 2013 aged 69, of leukaemia. The BBC's head of TV Sport, Philip Bernie, said of him:

"For a generation he was one of the most familiar and respected names in sports broadcasting. Tony was an outstanding sports journalist and a formidable broadcaster, whose death will sadden everyone at BBC Sport."
