= Harry Carpenter =

British sports commentator (1925–2010)

Harry Carpenter OBE
- Born: 17 October 1925; South Norwood, London
- Died: 20 March 2010 (aged 84); King's College Hospital, London
- Occupation: Sports commentator (boxing)

Harry Leonard Carpenter, OBE (17 October 1925 – 20 March 2010) was a British BBC sports commentator broadcasting from the early 1950s until his retirement in 1994. His speciality was boxing. He was presenter of programmes such as Sportsnight (1975–1985) and Grandstand and anchored coverage of Wimbledon and golf tournaments.

== Early life and early career ==
Carpenter was the son of a wholesale fish merchant at Billingsgate Market and was born at South Norwood in South London. He attended Selhurst Grammar School in Surrey. During World War II, he served as a telegrapher in the Royal Navy. Upon leaving the Navy after the end of World War II, he began his journalism career in 1946. He began sports reporting as a sub-editor for several national newspapers. He was an avid supporter of Crystal Palace FC, the local team in South Norwood.

== Career ==
He joined the BBC in 1949 and was the corporation's full-time boxing correspondent from 1962 until his retirement in 1994, when Jim Neilly replaced him in that capacity. He served as a boxing columnist for the Sporting Record from 1950 to 1954. He then worked for the Daily Mail as a boxing writer and sports columnist from 1954 to 1962.

While writing for the national papers, Carpenter broadcast regularly on radio and television, covering thousands of professional and amateur fights including all Olympic Games from 1956 until 1992. He wrote three books about boxing, produced the documentary, The Richest Prize in Sport, and served as the voice of the Hall of Fame series, Sports Archive and Great Moments in Sport.

Carpenter described the end of the historic boxing fight between George Foreman and Muhammad Ali in Zaire, in 1974, a fight which became known as "The Rumble in the Jungle", as "the most extraordinary few seconds that I have ever seen in a boxing ring".

And suddenly Ali looks very tired indeed. In fact, Ali at times now looks as though he can hardly lift his arms up ... Oh, he's got him with a right hand! He's got him! Oh, you can't believe it – and he's doing his shuffle! And I don't think Foreman's going to get up ... he's trying to beat the count ... and he's out! Oh my God, he's won the title back at 32!

While occasionally given to raising his voice, as he did when Ali knocked out Foreman or when Barry McGuigan floored Eusebio Pedroza in 1985, Carpenter was widely regarded as unflappable and a great professional. Nowhere was this more apparent than at the fight between "Marvelous" Marvin Hagler and Alan Minter at the Empire Pool in 1980: after Hagler stopped Minter in the third round, the crowd, some of them fuelled by drink and hatred (Minter had previously said "no black man will take my title"), expressed their displeasure by hurling beer cans and bottles into the ring. While other members of the press hid under their chairs or protected themselves with typewriters, Carpenter continued to broadcast what he called "a shame and a disgrace to British boxing", even after he was struck several times with missiles.

Carpenter's rapport with former WBC World Heavyweight Champion Frank Bruno was well known. Carpenter often conducted post-match interviews with Bruno, whose catchphrase was "know what I mean, 'Arry?". Bruno's agent later stated that Bruno saw Carpenter as a "real friend."

Over the course of his career, Carpenter was recognised as "The Voice of Boxing." While his name was most often associated with boxing, Carpenter established himself as one of Britain's most versatile sportscasters, covering many of the major sporting events. He was a presenter of Sportsnight between 1975 and 1985 and a regular member of the broadcast team on Grandstand. He covered all major golf tournaments from 1965 until his retirement. He also served as commentator on the Oxford and Cambridge University Boat Race, and greyhound racing. He anchored coverage of Wimbledon for the BBC from 1967 until 1993.

His connection with greyhound racing began when he was a journalist for a national publication called the Greyhound Owner. He later commentated on the annual BBC Television Trophy shown on Sportsnight.

== Honours and recognition ==
Carpenter was appointed OBE in the 1991 New Year Honours.

He was the subject of This Is Your Life in 1991 when he was surprised by Michael Aspel at the Royal Oak, Canning Town, London.

== Death ==
Carpenter died in his sleep at King's College Hospital in South London in the early hours of Saturday morning, 20 March 2010, aged 84. He had been unwell since the summer of 2009 when he had a minor heart attack.
