= Jason Bell (American football) =

American football player (born 1978)

No. 33
- Positions: Cornerback, safety

Personal information
- Born: April 1, 1978 (age 48); Long Beach, California, U.S.
- Listed height: 6 ft 0 in (1.83 m)
- Listed weight: 196 lb (89 kg)

Career information
- High school: Robert A. Millikan (Long Beach, California)
- College: UCLA
- NFL draft: 2001: undrafted

Career history
- Dallas Cowboys (2001); Houston Texans (2002–2005); New York Giants (2006)

Career NFL statistics
- Tackles: 85
- Interceptions: 1
- Passes defended: 10
- Stats at Pro Football Reference

Jason Dewande Bell (born April 1, 1978) is an American former professional football player who was a cornerback in the National Football League (NFL) for the Dallas Cowboys, Houston Texans and New York Giants. Bell played college football for the UCLA Bruins.

== Early life ==
Bell was born on April 1, 1978, in Long Beach, California, to parents Cortland and Geraldine Bell. He attended Robert A. Millikan High School, where he played quarterback, wide receiver and cornerback. As a senior, he posted 70 tackles, 5 interceptions, 19 passes defensed, 26-yards average in kickoff returns, 12-yards average in punt returns, while receiving All-league and All-city honors. He finished his high school career with 196 tackles, 12 interceptions, 38 passes defensed

He also practiced track, recording 10.7 seconds in the 100-meter dash, 21.89 seconds in the 200-meter dash and 22-feet in the long jump.

== College career ==
Bell accepted a football scholarship from University of California, Los Angeles (UCLA). As a true freshman, he played mainly on special teams for the Bruins. The next year, he started the final 5 games, posting 18 tackles and 4 passes defended.

In 1998, he contributed to the team winning the Pacific-10 Conference championship, while making 38 tackles and leading the team in passes defended (14).

In 1999, he was granted an additional year of eligibility due to a medical hardship, after his season was cut short from a surgery that removed bone spurs from his right heel. As a senior, he registered 42 tackles and 9 passes defended. He majored in history.

== Professional career ==
=== Dallas Cowboys ===
Bell was signed as an undrafted free agent by the Dallas Cowboys after the 2001 NFL draft, and made the roster based on his strong special teams play. As a gunner, he led the team in special teams tackles with 21. He was waived on September 1, 2002.

=== Houston Texans ===
On September 2, 2002, he was claimed off waivers by the Houston Texans and became a part of the inaugural season of the franchise. He led the team with 14 special teams tackles, even though he missed the first 3 games with a fractured right wrist. He received the Ed Block Courage Award at the end of the year.

Bell would remain a core special teams player during his time with the Houston Texans. In 2003, he was second on the team with 15 special teams tackles, even though he was declared inactive for 3 games with a knee injury.

In 2004, he registered 6 special teams tackles. On November 17, he was placed on the injured reserve list after breaking his right forearm while covering a punt against the Indianapolis Colts.

=== New York Giants ===
On March 13, 2006, Bell was signed as an unrestricted free agent by the New York Giants and was moved to safety during the season. He also played four games with a fractured right forearm he sustained in week 12 against the Tennessee Titans. Bell aggravated a back injury while working out during the offseason and was placed on the injured reserve list on July 25, 2007.

On August 23, 2007, Bell was released by the Giants, marking the end of his football career.

== NFL career statistics ==
Legend
**Bold**	Career high

=== Regular season ===
Year	Team	Games		Tackles					Interceptions					Fumbles			
Year	Team	GP	GS	Cmb	Solo	Ast	Sck	TFL	Int	Yds	TD	Lng	PD	FF	FR	Yds	TD
2001	DAL	**16**	0	16	14	2	0.0	0	0	0	0	0	0	0	0	0	0
2002	HOU	13	0	17	16	1	0.0	0	0	0	0	0	2	0	**1**	0	0
2003	HOU	13	0	14	9	**5**	0.0	0	0	0	0	0	1	**1**	0	0	0
2004	HOU	9	0	3	3	0	0.0	0	0	0	0	0	0	0	0	0	0
2005	HOU	**16**	0	12	11	1	0.0	0	0	0	0	0	**4**	**1**	0	0	0
2006	NYG	15	**1**	**23**	**20**	3	0.0	0	**1**	-7	0	-7	3	0	0	0	0
Career		82	1	85	73	12	0.0	0	1	-7	0	-7	10	2	1	0	0

=== Playoffs ===
Year	Team	Games		Tackles					Interceptions					Fumbles			
Year	Team	GP	GS	Cmb	Solo	Ast	Sck	TFL	Int	Yds	TD	Lng	PD	FF	FR	Yds	TD
2006	NYG	**1**	0	**7**	**7**	0	0.0	0	0	0	0	0	**2**	0	0	0	0
Career		1	0	7	7	0	0.0	0	0	0	0	0	2	0	0	0	0

== Personal life ==
After his retirement from the NFL, he transitioned into private wealth management. He joined Masters Private Client Group, where he is currently a partner, specializing in professional athletes and entertainers and their unique financial needs. He has been noted as one of the "Top 37 Football Players on Wall Street" by Business Insider.

In addition to his business work, he currently works as an NFL pundit, working alongside Osi Umenyiora, originally for the BBC's coverage of the league on their preview and highlights shows. As of 2022 the show has moved to ITV. ITV axed the show ahead of the 2024 season. Also in 2022 Bell became part of the NFL coverage on Sky Sports, covering their live Sunday games in-studio.

Bell dated Nadine Coyle from British girl group Girls Aloud in 2008, and they were engaged at one point but later separated. They reunited sometime in 2013, with Coyle announcing her pregnancy in August that year. She gave birth to their daughter, Anaíya, in early 2014. The couple reportedly separated in 2019 "due to their increasingly distanced lives", as Bell remained in the United States when Coyle returned to Northern Ireland in 2015, but remained friends. By March 2021, the two were living together in Northern Ireland to allow Bell to co-parent Anaíya during the COVID-19 pandemic.

The start of Fyre: The Greatest Party That Never Happened shows Bell involved in the promotion of 2017's failed Fyre Festival with Billy McFarland.

On September 1, 2020, it was announced that Bell would be a contestant on season 18 of the British TV dancing contest Strictly Come Dancing, the originator of the global Dancing with the Stars franchise. He was partnered with Luba Mushtuk. In week three he was in the dance-off against Nicola Adams and Katya Jones and lost, therefore leaving the show. In November 2022, Bell competed as a contestant on The Chase Celebrity Special.
