= Simon Brotherton =

British sports commentator

Simon Charles Brotherton is a sports commentator for the BBC, appearing on Match of the Day and BBC Radio 5 Live, as well as TNT Sports television.

Brotherton was still at school when he began his career with BBC Local Radio and developed further while he was studying at Birmingham University where he joined Birmingham's local BBC radio station WM.

In 1990 Brotherton joined the BBC network, where, as well as commentating on the Premier League, he has commentated on a variety of football tournaments including the FIFA World Cup, UEFA Euro 1996, UEFA Euro 2000, UEFA Euro 2004, UEFA Euro 2008, UEFA Euro 2012, UEFA Euro 2016, the African Cup of Nations, the UEFA Champions League Final and the UEFA Cup/UEFA Europa League Final.

He has also reported from the Tour de France races, Formula One coverage, World Championship Boxing, Athletics and Major League Baseball's World Series.

He lives in West Sussex with his wife and their two daughters. In 2013, he became the lead BBC commentator for the Track Cycling World Championships and Olympic Games cycling (from 2016) following Hugh Porter's move to ITV. Brotherton is also the lead Channel 4 commentator for the Paralympic Games cycling (as of 2016).

Brotherton was also commentator at the 2018, 2022 and 2026 Winter Olympics for the BBC in the speed skating.
