= Des Lynam =

Television and radio presenter (born 1942)

Des Lynam OBE
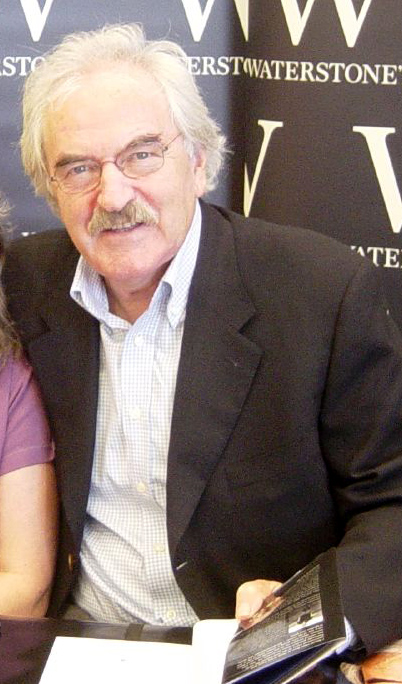
- Lynam in 2005
- Born: Desmond Michael Lynam; 17 September 1942 (age 84); Ennis, County Clare, Ireland
- Occupation: Radio/Television presenter
- Years active: 1968–present
- Spouses: Susan Skinner (m. 1965; div. 1974) Rosemary Diamond (m. 2011)
- Children: 1

Desmond Michael Lynam (born 17 September 1942) is an Irish-born British television and radio presenter. In a broadcasting career spanning more than forty years, he has hosted television coverage of many of the world's major sporting events, presenting Grandstand, Match of the Day, Wimbledon, the Grand National, Sportsnight, the World Cup and Olympic Games, as well as presenting non-sporting programmes such as Holiday, How Do They Do That? and Countdown.

== Early years ==
Lynam was born in Ennis, County Clare, Ireland, and moved with his family to Brighton, England, at the age of six. He recalled having a strong Irish accent at the time, but eventually lost it. He passed the eleven-plus in 1954, to attend Varndean Grammar School. After sitting his A-levels, he went into the insurance business.

== Broadcasting career ==
=== 1968–1999 ===
Lynam started his career in broadcasting as a freelance radio journalist on BBC Radio Brighton (1968–1969). He quickly joined national BBC radio in London, and went on to anchor Sport on Two and Sports Report (1969–1978) on BBC Radio 2. From 1974 to 1976, he co-presented the Today programme on BBC Radio 4 on three mornings each week. He was also the radio boxing commentator for 20 years.

Lynam moved to television in 1977 starting off with Sportswide as part of Nationwide continuing until the series ended in 1983, and then presented Grandstand (1979–1991, occasionally until 1999), Sportsnight (1991–1997) and Match of the Day (1988–1999). He also fronted BBC coverage of Wimbledon (highlights 1983 to 1989 with Gerald Williams, main presenter 1991–1997 and 1999), the Grand National (1985–1999), the FIFA World Cup (1982–1998) and the Olympic Games (1980–1996).

In 1988 and 1989, Lynam presented the BBC series Holiday.

In April 1989, Lynam was present at the Hillsborough disaster whilst covering the FA Cup semi-final match between Liverpool and Nottingham Forest for Match of the Day.

Between 1988 and the end of the 1991–1992 season, the BBC had lost the rights for top flight league matches to ITV, although the BBC retained rights for the FA Cup. Lynam presented Match of the Day on FA Cup weekends for those four seasons. In August 1992, at the start of the new formation of the Premier League, the BBC regained highlights of top flight league matches. Lynam presented Match of the Day highlights of Premier League matches on the BBC until 1999.

Throughout his time on the BBC, Lynam was praised for his witty and down-to-earth style. In 1998, Lynam made a brief return to BBC Radio 2, presenting the 5–7pm Drivetime show on Fridays only. During this period, Johnnie Walker presented the show from Monday to Thursday.

=== ITV: 1999–2004 ===
Lynam moved from the BBC to ITV in August 1999, to present ITV's live football coverage, including coverage of the midweek UEFA Champions League. Lynam said at the time: "Leaving the BBC after 30 years was not an easy decision to make, but it was time for a new challenge – and it's no secret that live football is what I love best." A month earlier, Lynam had complained in a newspaper interview about BBC1's late scheduling on a Saturday evening of Match of the Day, which had sometimes been shown with a late start time of 10.50pm. Lynam said: "The moment you put it past 10.30 I start fuming."

ITV later gained a deal to air Premier League highlights. In 2001, Lynam presented The Premiership, which was first aired on ITV at 7pm on 18 August 2001. After disappointing viewing figures in the first couple of months for The Premiership on ITV, a decision was made to shift the programme from its original 7pm slot to a permanent later time of 10:30pm, from 17 November 2001. The programme ran until May 2004.

Lynam continued to present football coverage for ITV until 2004. He decided to retire from presenting live sport after the Euro 2004 football championships. Soon afterwards the BBC announced that Lynam would present a new weekly radio programme, Des Meets..., on BBC Radio 5 Live from August 2004.

=== 2005–2013 ===
In May 2005, Lynam presented the BBC One programme We'll Meet Again, marking the 60th anniversary of VE Day. During the show Tara McDonald performed the song "We'll Meet Again" live. The following month, he presented an episode of Have I Got News For You on BBC One, the third time he had presented the show, having twice hosted the show the previous year.

In June and July 2005, Lynam co-presented (with Sir David Frost) the series The World's Greatest Sporting Legend on Sky One. In the summer of 2005, Lynam also covered the Wimbledon Championships for BBC Radio 5 Live.

In October 2005, Lynam published his autobiography I Should Have Been at Work. The title of the book is a reference to when Lynam said "Good afternoon. Shouldn't you be at work?" when introducing coverage of an England match at 2pm on a Monday during the 1998 FIFA World Cup finals.

In 2005, Lynam said that he regretted his decision to move to ITV from the BBC in 1999. Lynam said: "If it was a decision I had to make now I probably wouldn't do it. Some people said I went from being a great broadcaster, or at least a very acceptably good one, to being a somewhat inadequate one overnight".

Also that year, Lynam replaced Richard Whiteley as the host of Channel 4's Countdown, with his first episode airing on 31 October 2005, following Whiteley's death. Although his contract was to last until December 2007, Lynam left Countdown after less than 18 months at the end of 2006, because he regularly needed to travel to Leeds where Countdown was recorded, while his home was in Worthing, West Sussex about 250 miles away. He was replaced by Des O'Connor. Lynam did, however, return for Countdown's 5000th episode, broadcast on 26 March 2010, as the Dictionary Corner guest.

After leaving Countdown, Lynam hosted Sport Mastermind and appeared in Setanta Sports' commercials for its coverage of the Premier League.

In April 2009, Lynam spoke about his recollection of the Hillsborough disaster for a Football Focus special programme marking the 20th anniversary of the disaster.

From 2011 to 2013, Lynam co-hosted, with Christopher Matthew, three series of Touchline Tales on BBC Radio 4, a humorous look at sport.

In a 2015 interview, Lynam stated that "I liked the radio boxing commentaries very much, especially following Muhammad Ali around the world. That was a great period of my life."

== Personal life ==
Lynam married Susan Skinner on 2 October 1965 and they had one son, Patrick (born 1970); however, by 1973 the marriage began to break down owing to Lynam's career commitments, and they divorced in 1974. Lynam married his long-term partner, Rosemary Diamond, in 2011. They live together in East Preston, West Sussex.

Lynam is a supporter of Brighton & Hove Albion. In the 1990s he declined an invitation to join the board of directors at Brighton.

Lynam was appointed Officer of the Order of the British Empire (OBE) in the 2008 New Year Honours.

In May 2013, Lynam endorsed the UK Independence Party (UKIP), revealing that he voted for the party in local elections that year.

== Bibliography ==
- Des Lynam (2005). I Should Have Been at Work. HarperCollins Entertainment. ISBN 978-0-00-720544-8.

Awards and achievements
Preceded by Jim Rosenthal	RTS Television Sport Awards; Best Sports Presenter; 1998	Succeeded by Jim Rosenthal
