= David Coleman =

British sports commentator (1926–2013)

David Coleman OBE
- Coleman in 1969
- Born: David Robert Coleman; 26 April 1926; Alderley Edge, Cheshire, England
- Died: 21 December 2013 (aged 87); Windsor, Berkshire, England
- Occupation: Sports commentator
- Years active: 1954–2000
- Employer: BBC
- Television: Grandstand; Sportsnight; A Question of Sport
- Spouse: Barbara Manning (m. 1952)
- Children: 6

David Robert Coleman (26 April 1926 – 21 December 2013) was a British sports commentator and television presenter who worked for the BBC for 46 years. He covered eleven Summer Olympic Games from 1960 to 2000 and six FIFA World Cups from 1962 to 1982.

Coleman presented some of the BBC's leading sporting programmes, including Grandstand and Sportsnight (originally titled Sportsnight with Coleman until 1972), and was the host of A Question of Sport for 18 years. He retired from the BBC in 2000. Later that year he became the first broadcaster to receive the Olympic Order award, in recognition of his contribution to the Olympic movement.

== Early life ==
Born in Alderley Edge, Cheshire, of Irish heritage (his immediate family hailed from County Cork), Coleman competed as a schoolboy middle-distance runner. In 1949, he won the Manchester Mile as a member of Stockport Harriers, the only non-international runner to do so. He competed in the English National Cross-Country Championships for Manchester Athletic Club in 1952 (116th, 3rd team) and 1953 (118). He ran 440 yards (¼ mile) for Staffordshire. Injury eventually caused him to give up competitive running, and he later became president of the Wolverhampton & Bilston Athletics Club.

Coleman worked as a reporter for the Stockport Express. In 1946 he was called up for national service. He served in the Royal Corps of Signals and worked for the British Army Newspaper Unit. Part of his time in national service was in Kenya. He joined Kemsley Newspapers after demobilisation and at 22 became editor of the Cheshire County Express. He did not attend the 1952 Olympic trials because of hamstring injuries. Instead he approached the BBC to see if they would like any help with athletics coverage. Although he did not have an audition, the BBC asked him to cover Roger Bannister at Bradford City Police Sports. The following year he began freelance radio work in Manchester.

== BBC ==
In 1954 Coleman moved to Birmingham and joined the BBC as a news assistant and sports editor. His first television appearance was on Sportsview, on the day that Roger Bannister broke the four-minute mile. In November 1955, he was appointed sports editor for the BBC's Midlands Region.

=== BBC Sports presenter ===
In October 1958, the BBC's Head of Sport Peter Dimmock recruited Coleman to be the presenter of the new Saturday afternoon sports programme Grandstand. He continued as the regular presenter until 1968 later returning from 1979 to 1984. He also presented the BBC Sports Personality of the Year from 1961, and Sportsnight from 1968 to 1972 as well as other special sporting events such as the Grand National. He even covered the return of the Beatles from the United States and the 1959 General Election for the BBC from the Press Association headquarters.

As well as a presenter, Coleman was also a sports commentator. He presented and/or commentated on eleven Olympic Games from Rome 1960 to Sydney 2000, as well as eight Commonwealth Games. He covered a total of seven World Cups, both as a commentator and a presenter.

=== Football ===
Coleman covered as a secondary commentator for the 1970 World Cup behind Kenneth Wolstenholme but took over as BBC's senior football commentator when Wolstenholme left in 1971. Coleman commentated on the World Cup Final in 1974 and 1978, the European Cup Final in 1973 and 1975 and the FA Cup final from 1972 to 1976 inclusive, although he missed the 1977 game because he was in a legal dispute with the BBC, allowing John Motson to make his FA Cup final debut. Coleman returned for the 1978 final before Motson took over the following year. Coleman's last live football commentary was on 26 May 1979 when he described England's 3–1 win over Scotland at Wembley Stadium in the 1978–79 British Home Championship, although he continued to work at football matches as a secondary commentator until October 1981 with his last game being a midweek League Cup game between Tottenham Hotspur and Manchester United.

=== Athletics ===
In 1968, at the Mexico Olympics Coleman was recorded at 200 words per minute while commentating on David Hemery's win in the 400m Hurdles. After the finish he could only identify the first two runners and exclaimed: "Who cares who's third?" The bronze medal winner turned out to be another Briton, John Sherwood.

Satirists of the 1980s and 1990s often portrayed Coleman as constantly surprised by mundane happenings at athletic events. Clive James wrote that the difference between commentating and 'Colemantating' is that "a commentator says something you may wish to remember; a Colemantator says something you try to forget". However, Coleman's ability to generate excitement through his commentary was widely praised. In 1972, he broadcast for several hours during the siege at the Munich Olympics as well as the memorial service days later. Coleman concentrated on athletics commentary from 1984.

=== Tennis ===
Coleman was a key member of BBC Television's Wimbledon coverage from 1960 until 1969, hosting the live daytime coverage until 1969.

=== Grand National ===
Coleman presented coverage of the Grand National for 23 years, between 1961 and 1976 and again from 1978 to 1984. He was due to present the first in 1960 but had to step down due to illness. He was also absent from the 1977 Grand National, which turned out to be Red Rum's historic third win, due to his contract dispute with the BBC.

=== Other ===
Coleman also hosted sports quiz show A Question of Sport for 18 years from 1979 to 1997, striking up a strong rapport with captains such as Emlyn Hughes, Ian Botham, Willie Carson and Bill Beaumont. Although he hosted the vast majority of the shows, he was occasionally absent and stand-in hosts were drafted in. Former host David Vine returned to the show in 1989 when Coleman was ill, Bill Beaumont hosted two editions in 1996, while Will Carling temporarily replaced Beaumont as team captain, and Sue Barker hosted two editions later that year.

Coleman's on-air gaffes, use of clichés and occasional mispronunciations led the satirical magazine Private Eye to name its sports bloopers column Colemanballs in his honour.

== Retirement ==
Coleman retired from broadcasting after the 2000 Summer Olympics. In December 2000, he was presented with the Olympic Order by then-IOC president Juan Antonio Samaranch in recognition of his services to the Olympic ideals. He retired, requesting no fanfare or recognition by the BBC, despite working for the corporation for over 40 years.

The BBC later broadcast a programme entitled The Quite Remarkable David Coleman to celebrate Coleman's life, which was aired just after his 85th birthday in May 2011.

== Personal life, illness and death ==
Coleman married Barbara Manning in 1952 in north-east Cheshire. They had six children. His daughter Anne (born 1954) was a British ladies' show jumping champion. His son Michael (born 1962) was a Panavia Tornado navigator, who flew in the Gulf War in 1991, and had become a Squadron Leader. They had twin sons in 1955 and two other daughters in 1961 and 1969. He lived in Warwickshire and Buckinghamshire through his life and lived in Chippenham, Wiltshire, at the time of his death.

In the 1993 New Year Honours, Coleman was appointed Officer of the Order of the British Empire (OBE). He was also given the Judges' Award For Sport in the 1996 Royal Television Society Awards. In 2000, he became the first journalist or broadcaster to be awarded the Olympic Order.

=== Death ===
Coleman died from complications of bronchopneumonia and a stroke at a hospital in Windsor, Berkshire, on 21 December 2013, at the age of 87.
