= List of Wimbledon broadcasters =

Beginning with the 2018 tournament, an in-house operation known as Wimbledon Broadcasting Services (WBS) has served as the official host broadcaster of the tournament, replacing BBC Sport.

== United Kingdom ==
Since 1937 the BBC has broadcast the tournament on television in the UK (though 1937-39 daily broadcasts only lasted from half an hour to an hour a day). (Note: During the first year of television coverage in 1937 the BBC used two cameras at the Centre Court to transmit matches for a maximum of half an hour a day. The first match to be broadcast was between Bunny Austin and George Lyttleton-Rogers.) From 1946 BBC Television broadcast Wimbledon live from 2-3pm until approximately 7.30pm. With play starting on centre court after 2pm in those days, this represented a full day's play, though sometimes the coverage was shared with other sports such as cricket and racing, a practice that was to continue until 1998. From 1950 to 1958 short newsreel films of the day's play lasting between five and fifteen minutes narrated by Peter Wilson were shown late in the evening. In the early 1960s, brief highlights were shown after the day's play. It wasn't until 1964 that the BBC had a stand-alone Wimbledon evening highlights programme. One of the most notable British commentators was Dan Maskell, who commentated on the Championships from 1951 and 1991 and was known as the BBC's "voice of tennis". John Barrett succeeded him in that role until he retired in 2006. Current commentators working for the BBC at Wimbledon include British ex-players Tim Henman and Samantha Smith; tennis legends such as John McEnroe and Tracy Austin; and general sports commentators including Andrew Cotter and Nick Mullins. The matches covered are primarily split between its two main terrestrial channels, BBC One and BBC Two, and their Red Button service. This can result in live matches being moved across all 3 channels. The BBC holds the broadcast rights for Wimbledon until 2033.

The coverage is presented by Clare Balding (highlights 2015–2022, live coverage 2023-present), Isa Guha (co-anchor of live coverage 2023–present) and Qasa Alom (highlights 2023–present). Previous BBC presenters include Sue Barker (guest on highlights 1993, highlights 1994–1999, live coverage 2000–2022) Des Lynam (highlights 1983–1989, live coverage 1991-1997 and 1999), David Vine (highlights Wimbledon Pro 1967, 1979–1982) John Inverdale (highlights 2000–2014), Harry Carpenter (live coverage 1967, 1970–1990, highlights 1971-1978 and 1990–1993), Jack Kramer (highlights 1964–1970), David Coleman (live coverage 1960-1966 and 1968–1969) and Steve Rider (1986 and 1998)

The Wimbledon Finals are obliged to be shown live and in full on terrestrial television (BBC Television Service, ITV, Channel 4, or Channel 5) by government mandate. Highlights of the rest of the tournament must be provided by terrestrial stations; live coverage (excepting the finals) may be sought by satellite or cable TV.

The BBC was forced to apologise after many viewers complained about "over-talking" by its commentary team during the TV coverage of the event in 2011. It said in a statement that views on commentary were subjective but that they "do appreciate that over-talking can irritate our audience". The BBC added that it hoped it had achieved "the right balance" across its coverage and was "of course sorry if on occasion you have not been satisfied". Tim Henman and John McEnroe were among the ex-players commentating. In 2024 The Spectator criticised the "Baldingisation" of BBC Wimbledon coverage.

Wimbledon was also involved in a piece of television history, when on 1 July 1967 the first official colour television broadcast took place in the UK. Four hours live coverage of the 1967 Championships was shown on BBC Two, which was the first television channel in Europe to regularly broadcast in colour. Footage of that historic match no longer survives, however, the Gentlemen's Final of that year is still held in the BBC archives because it was the first Gentlemen's Final transmitted in colour. The tennis balls used were traditionally white, but were switched to yellow in 1986 to make them stand out for colour television. Since 2007, Wimbledon matches have been transmitted in high-definition, originally on the BBC's free-to-air channel BBC HD, with continual live coverage during the tournament of Centre Court and Court No. 1 as well as an evening highlights show Today at Wimbledon. Coverage is now shown on BBC One and Two's HD feeds. Beginning 2018, all centre court matches are televised in 4K ultra-high-definition.

The BBC's opening theme music for Wimbledon since 1976 was composed by Keith Mansfield and is titled "Light and Tuneful". A piece titled "A Sporting Occasion" is the traditional closing theme, though nowadays coverage typically ends either with a montage set to a popular song or with no music at all. Mansfield also composed the piece "World Champion", used by NBC during intervals (change-overs, set breaks, etc.) and at the close of broadcasts throughout the tournament.

=== Commentators ===
Below is a list of men's singles final commentators for BBC TV.

Year	Network	Play-by-play	Colour commentators	Courtside reporter
2027	BBC	Andrew Cotter		
2026	BBC	Andrew Castle	Andre Agassi & Tim Henman	Todd Woodbridge
2025	BBC	Andrew Castle	Todd Woodbridge & Tim Henman	
2024	BBC	Andrew Castle	Nick Kyrgios & Tim Henman	
2023	BBC	Andrew Castle	Todd Woodbridge & Tim Henman	
2022	BBC	Andrew Castle	Todd Woodbridge & Tim Henman	
2021	BBC	Andrew Castle	Boris Becker & Tim Henman	
2019	BBC	Andrew Castle	Boris Becker & Tim Henman	
2017	BBC	Andrew Castle	Boris Becker & Tim Henman	
2016	BBC	Andrew Castle	Lleyton Hewitt & Tim Henman	
2015	BBC	Andrew Castle	Andy Roddick & Tim Henman	
2014	BBC	Andrew Castle	Jimmy Connors & Tim Henman	
2013	BBC	Andrew Castle	Boris Becker & Tim Henman	
2012	BBC	Andrew Castle	Boris Becker & Tim Henman	
2009	BBC	Andrew Castle	Boris Becker & Tim Henman	
2008	BBC	Andrew Castle	Tim Henman	
2005	BBC	Andrew Castle	Jimmy Connors & John Lloyd	
2003	BBC	Andrew Castle	Boris Becker & John Lloyd	
2002	BBC	John Barrett	Boris Becker & John Lloyd	
2001	BBC	John Barrett	Pat Cash & John Lloyd	
2000	BBC	David Mercer	Pat Cash & John Lloyd	
1999	BBC	David Mercer	Pat Cash	
1998	BBC	John Barrett	Pat Cash	
1993	BBC	John Barrett	Bill Threlfall	
1992	BBC	John Barrett	Bill Threlfall & Mark Cox	
1982	BBC	Dan Maskell	John Barrett	
1980	BBC	Dan Maskell	John Barrett & Mark Cox	
1977	BBC	Dan Maskell	Mark Cox	
1976	BBC	Dan Maskell	Jack Kramer	
1975	BBC	Dan Maskell	Billy Knight	
1973	BBC	Dan Maskell	Billy Knight	
1960	BBC	Dan Maskell	Jack Kramer	
1955	BBC	Dan Maskell	Peter West	
1951	BBC	Freddie Grisewood	Dan Maskell	
1950	BBC	Freddie Grisewood	Raymond Glendenning	
1946	BBC	Freddie Grisewood	None	

Below is a list of men's singles final commentators for ITV.

Year	Network	Commentators
1956-1968	ITV	Fred Perry, Emlyn Jones & Dennis Coombe

Dan Maskell began commentating on the Wimbledon Championships in 1949 as an expert summariser for BBC Radio alongside Max Robertson, before switching to television in 1951 with Freddie Grisewood. He would remain as the "voice of tennis" on the BBC until his retirement in 1991. When commenting on a particularly exciting piece of play or an outstanding shot, he sometimes used his most remembered and revered catchphrase "Oh, I say!". The last Wimbledon match that he commentated on was the 1991 Men's Singles final between Michael Stich and Boris Becker (which Stich won). The last tennis match Maskell commentated on for BBC Television was the 1991 Grand Slam Cup final between David Wheaton and Michael Chang.

John Barrett's broadcasting career with BBC Television began in 1971. Barrett began commentating on Wimbledon men's singles finals for BBC Television at the end of the 1970s. Barrett's voice was heard on the BBC broadcast of the epic fourth set tiebreak between Borg and McEnroe in the 1980 final (this has often been shown again on TV). Barrett commentated on Wimbledon men's singles finals until 1998. David Mercer took over from Barrett for the 1999 and 2000 men's singles finals, but Barrett commentated on the 2001 and 2002 finals. From 2003, Andrew Castle commentated on Wimbledon men's singles finals instead of Barrett. Barrett announced his retirement from the BBC commentary box at Wimbledon in 2006.

ITV covered Wimbledon live from 1956 to 1968, but for fewer hours each day than the BBC. Fred Perry was their lead commentator. In 1990 the short-lived British Satellite Broadcasting, on its sports channel carried extra coverage of Wimbledon for subscribers. British Eurosport showed evening highlights for a few years around the millennium and showed highlights and live coverage of finals from 2016 until 2024 with the same coverage continuing on Eurosport's successor TNT Sports.

== United States ==
In the United States, ABC began showing taped highlights of the Wimbledon Gentlemen's Singles Final in the 1960s on its Wide World of Sports series. NBC began a 43-year run of covering Wimbledon in 1969, with same-day taped (and often edited) coverage of the Gentlemen's Singles Final. In 1979, the network began carrying the Gentlemen's Singles Finals live. In 1982, the network began carrying the Ladies' Singles Finals live. For the next few decades, Americans made a tradition of NBC's "Breakfast at Wimbledon" specials at weekends. Live coverage started early in the morning (the US being a minimum of 5 hours behind the UK) and continued well into the afternoon, interspersed with commentary and interviews from Bud Collins, whose tennis acumen and famous patterned trousers were well known to tennis fans in the US. Collins was sacked by NBC in 2007, but was promptly hired by ESPN, the cable home for The Championships in the States. For many years NBC's primary Wimbledon host was veteran broadcaster Dick Enberg.

From 1975 to 1999, premium channel HBO carried weekday coverage of Wimbledon. Hosts included Jim Lampley, Billie Jean King, Martina Navratilova, John Lloyd and Barry MacKay (tennis) among others. ESPN took over as the cable-television partner in 2003.

The AELTC grew frustrated with NBC's policy of waiting to begin its quarterfinal and semifinal coverage until after the conclusion of Today at 10 a.m. local, as well as broadcasting live only to the Eastern Time Zone and using tape-delay in all others. NBC also held over high-profile matches for delayed broadcast in its window, regardless of any ongoing matches. In one notorious incident in 2009, ESPN2's coverage of the Tommy Haas-Novak Djokovic quarterfinal was forced off the air nationwide when it ran past 10 a.m. Eastern, after which NBC showed the conclusion of the match on tape only after presenting the previous Ivo Karlović-Roger Federer quarterfinal in full. Beginning with the 2012 tournament, coverage moved to ESPN and ESPN2, marking the second major tennis championship (after the Australian Open) where live coverage is exclusively on pay television. The finals are also broadcast tape-delayed on ABC. Since 2022, live matches returned to broadcast television as ABC aired coverage on weekends, live coast to coast.

Taped coverage using the world feed is aired in primetime and overnights on Tennis Channel and is branded Wimbledon Primetime.

Year	Network	Play-by-play	Color commentators
2007	NBC	Ted Robinson	John McEnroe (men only) and Mary Carillo (women only)
2006	NBC	Ted Robinson	John McEnroe and Mary Carillo
2005	NBC	Ted Robinson	John McEnroe (men only) and Mary Carillo
1978	NBC	Bud Collins	John Newcombe

From 1968 to 1972, Bud Collins worked for CBS Sports during its coverage of the US Open tournament, moving to NBC Sports in 1972 to work that network's Wimbledon coverage. During the 2007 Wimbledon tournament, Collins announced that NBC had chosen not to renew his contract and was letting him go. Collins had covered tennis for the network for 35 years. He insisted that he had no plans to retire and would continue to cover tennis for The Boston Globe. On July 8, 2007, the final day of the tournament, fellow Globe sportswriter Bob Ryan, on the ESPN TV show The Sports Reporters, ridiculed NBC for this decision. He said the 78-year-old Collins "still has his fastball" and praised the Globe for retaining Collins. Collins was hired by ESPN on August 7, 2007. He teamed with onetime NBC partner Dick Enberg on the network's Wimbledon, US Open, French Open, and Australian Open coverage. He has also covered the US Open for XM Satellite Radio.

As NBC's voice of the Wimbledon Tennis Championships, the last tournament for him being in 1999 (alongside Bud Collins and, later, John McEnroe), Dick Enberg regularly concluded the network's coverage of the two-week event with thematically appropriate observations accompanied by a montage of video clips. Beginning in 2004, Enberg served as a play-by-play announcer for ESPN2's coverage of the Wimbledon and French Open tennis tournaments, adding the Australian Open the following year. Enberg came to ESPN on lease from CBS, where he already called the US Open, the one Grand Slam tournament not covered by ESPN until 2009. At the 2004 French Open, Enberg called a match per day and also provided his "Enberg Moments". At Wimbledon in 2004, he participated in a new one-hour morning show called Breakfast at Wimbledon. ESPN asked CBS for permission to use Enberg during the summer of 2004 at both the French Open and Wimbledon. Enberg then surprised his new bosses by volunteering for the 2005 Australian Open in January 2005. "I've never been to Australia," he said. "At my age then [69], to be able to work a full Grand Slam is something I'd like to have at the back of my book." Enberg stopped calling the French Open after 2009 due to his Padres commitments, though he continued to call the Wimbledon and Australian Open tournaments over the next two years. In June 2011, it was reported that his ESPN contract had ended and that the 2011 Wimbledon tournament would be his final one for the network.

Jimmy Connors did commentary with NBC-TV in 1990 and 1991, during its coverage of the French Open and Wimbledon tournaments. During the Wimbledon tournaments of 2005, 2006, and 2007, Connors commentated for the BBC alongside John McEnroe (among others), providing moments of heated discussion between two former archrivals. Connors returned to BBC commentary at Wimbledon in 2014. Connors has also served as a commentator and analyst for the Tennis Channel since the US Open tournament of 2009.

Mary Carillo worked as both a host and analyst on HBO's Wimbledon coverage from 1996 to 1999, and on Turner Sports' coverage of Wimbledon from 2000 to 2002. In May 2003, Carillo joined NBC Sports as an analyst on the network's French Open and Wimbledon coverage, having made her debut as an analyst on NBC for the 1996 Family Circle Cup tennis event. Carillo's candid and insightful commentary has earned her accolades throughout the industry, including the distinction of being called "the sport's top analyst" by Sports Illustrated. She is known for her deep voice, quick wit and pointed sense of humor. Like her long-time friend and fellow Douglaston, Queens, New York native John McEnroe, Carillo is known for her colorful turns of speech, and is credited with coining the phrase "Big Babe Tennis" to describe the era in women's tennis dominated by large, powerful players such as Lindsay Davenport, Serena Williams and Venus Williams. Carillo's unabashed and opinionated style of tennis commentary has drawn criticism from several top players, notably Andre Agassi, Serena and Venus Williams, and Maria Sharapova. Nevertheless, she has been named Best Commentator by Tennis Magazine (1988–91), Best Commentator by World Tennis magazine (1986) and Broadcaster of the Year by the Women's Tennis Association (1981 and 1985).

- NBC aired 6.5 hours of taped delayed coverage on Saturday, July 8, 1978, starting with the ladies final, and then the gentleman's final. The ladies final was actually played on Friday, July 7, but was tape delayed by a full day. The gentleman's final was aired on same-day tape delay. Host Jim Simpson was joined by Hilary Hilton during the Woman's Final.
- From 2000-2002, TNT alongside CNN Sports Illustrated (and CNNfn in 2002 due to the former shutting down operations earlier in the year) broadcast same day, weekday coverage (approximately 89 hours of programming with TNT covering about 61 hours in prime time) of Wimbledon, replacing sister network HBO. Marv Albert (men's play-by-play), Mary Carillo (analyst/reporter/women's play-by-play), Jim Courier (men's analyst), Zina Garrison (women's analyst), Jim Huber (essayist), Ernie Johnson, Jr. (studio host), Phil Jones (reporter), Barry MacKay (tennis) (women's play-by-play), and Martina Navratilova (women's analyst) were among the commentators for TNT and CNN. Martina Navratilova also worked as an analyst on HBO's coverage of the Wimbledon Championships from 1995 through 1999.

== See also ==
- Tennis on television
- Tennis on ESPN#Announcers
- Tennis on HBO#Commentators
- Tennis on NBC#Commentators
- BBC Sport#Tennis
