= Tennis on television =

Tennis on television contains the current status and historical evolution of the television broadcasting of the sport of Tennis.

== Grand Slam events ==
Eurosport has the exclusive UK rights to the French Open until 2026, having had them exclusively since 2022. Prior to this, they had shared the rights with ITV Sport. where the bulk of the daily coverage had broadcast on ITV4 although both singles finals plus other weekend matches were aired on ITV. John Inverdale hosted the coverage. Commentators include Jim Courier, Amélie Mauresmo, Sam Smith, Mark Petchey, Nick Mullins and Fabrice Santoro.

Studio presentation for the French Open on Eurosport is hosted by Annabel Croft with the segment Hawk-Eye presented by former British Number 2 Jason Goodall. (Goodall was briefly ranked ahead of Chris Bailey, Nick Brown, Andrew Castle, Nick Fulwood, Mark Petchey, and James Turner, in May 1989).

BBC Sport holds the rights to broadcast the Wimbledon Tennis Championships and the Queen's Club Championships live on its television platforms. The Wimbledon contract has been held by the BBC since 1927 and the current contract lasts until 2024 making it the longest such contract in the world. The BBC produce over 900 hours of footage that is distributed to broadcasters in 159 different countries. BBC Wimbledon coverage is presented by former British number one and 1976 French Open Champion Sue Barker. Matches are broadcast live on BBC One, BBC Two, the Red Button, or Online via the BBC Sport website. Highlights are also shown on the long-running Today at Wimbledon, presented by Clare Balding, who replaced John Inverdale in 2015. The same year, the programme was renamed "Wimbledon 2day", with a new lighthearted magazine format, but after only one year, the format has been abandoned for 2016.

ESPN took full control of televising the US Open in 2015. When taking over, ESPN ended 47 years of coverage produced and aired by CBS. ESPN uses ESPN and ESPN2 for broadcasts, while putting outer court coverage on ESPN+. In the UK, Sky Sports had shown the event from 1991 until 2015 but decided not to renew its contract to broadcast this event and the rights later went to Amazon Prime. Sky decided to return to tennis in 2023 when it regained the rights to the event. This bid was successful and Sky will now show the tournament until 2027.

== Historical breakdown ==
=== 1930s-1940s ===
Since 1937 the BBC has broadcast the Wimbledon tournament on television in the UK. (Note: During the first year of television coverage in 1937 the BBC used two cameras at the Centre Court to transmit matches for a maximum of half an hour a day. The first match to be broadcast was between Bunny Austin and George Lyttleton-Rogers.) The matches covered are primarily split between its two main terrestrial channels, BBC One and BBC Two, and their Red Button service. This can result in live matches being moved across all 3 channels. The BBC holds the broadcast rights for Wimbledon until 2027. During the days of British Satellite Broadcasting, its sports channel carried extra coverage of Wimbledon for subscribers. The original commentator on TV at Wimbledon was Freddie Grisewood up until 1954. One of the most notable British commentators was Dan Maskell, who was known as the BBC's "voice of tennis". Maskell commentated on TV at Wimbledon from 1951 until his retirement in 1991. John Barrett succeeded him in that role until he retired in 2006. Current commentators working for the BBC at Wimbledon include British ex-players Andrew Castle, John Lloyd, Tim Henman, Greg Rusedski, Samantha Smith and Mark Petchey; tennis legends such as John McEnroe, Tracy Austin, Boris Becker and Lindsay Davenport; and general sports commentators including Andrew Cotter and Nick Mullins. The coverage is presented by Sue Barker (live) and Clare Balding (highlights). Previous BBC presenters include Des Lynam, David Vine, John Inverdale and Harry Carpenter.

NBC's relationship with tennis dates as far back as August 9, 1939. While at the amateur Eastern Grass Court Championships, in Rye, New York, NBC broadcast the first ever televised tennis match.

=== 1950s ===
NBC made history again at the 1955 Davis Cup, where they televised the first tennis match (United States vs. Australia) in color.

NBC broadcast the US Nationals as early as 1952 and up until 1964. Bud Palmer, Jack Kramer, Lindsey Nelson, Don Budge, Bill Stern and Bill Talbert were among the commentators during this period.

ITV showed live coverage of Wimbledon from 1956 to 1968, with Fred Perry as their lead commentator (Perry's great friend Dan Maskell was the lead commentator on the BBC's coverage throughout this period). ITV broadcast Wimbledon for fewer hours each day than BBC and had advertisements, which the BBC did not have.

=== 1960s ===
In the United States, ABC began showing taped highlights of the Wimbledon Gentlemen's Singles Final in 1963 on its Wide World of Sports series. ABC also covered the US Championships from 1965 to 1967, taking over from NBC.

Regular telecasts of the later stages of the Australian championships in Australia began in the mid 1960s. Channel 2 broadcast the 1965, 1966, 1968, 1970 and 1971 events. Channel 9 broadcast the 1969 event.

CBS Sports broadcast the first US Open Tennis Championships in 1968. Bud Collins called the action alongside Jack Kramer.

James Wall (best known for playing Mr. Baxter on Captain Kangaroo) was also the stage manager for 41 consecutive years on the US Open Tennis Championships telecasts.

NBC began a 43-year run of covering Wimbledon in 1969, with same-day taped (and often edited) coverage of the Gentlemen's Singles Final.

=== 1970s ===
From 1973 to 2018, the Seven Network served as the host broadcaster of the Australian Open. In March 2018, it was announced that the Nine Network had acquired the rights to the tournament beginning in 2020, for a period of five years. The network later bought the rights for the 2019 tournament as well. The Open's broadcast rights are lucrative in the country, as it occurs near the end of the Summer non-ratings season — which gives its broadcaster opportunities to promote their upcoming programming lineup.

NBC's coverage of the French Open began in 1975. Other than a three-year stint for the tournament on CBS, NBC has remained the U.S. broadcast television home of the French Open since 1983. The network shows weekend morning early-round matches in the afternoon on tape-delay; however, if a match is still being played, it will televise the match live. NBC's current deal for the tournament does not allow ESPN2 or Tennis Channel to show NBC's tape-delayed matches. NBC also tape-delays the men's semifinal, broadcasting it in the late morning on the same day, however it broadcasts both finals live.

Also in 1975, HBO began airing coverage (same day, weekday coverage only) of Wimbledon and did so until 1999.

Meanwhile, in 1975, the WTA increased its financial stature by signing a television broadcast contract with CBS, the first in the WTA's history. Further financial developments ensued.

In 1978, Hughes televised eight tournaments, all slotted for 6 to 8 p.m. on Saturdays and 5 to 7 p.m. on Sundays (all Eastern time). The telecasts were sold to commercial stations on an individual market basis by Taft Broadcasting. The announcers for these broadcasts were Bud Collins and Donald Dell.

BBC Television broadcast the 1977 and 1978 US Open finals (it did not broadcast the event again until 1981).

The BBC broadcasts two traditional Grass warm up events in the fortnight before the Wimbledon Championships. First is the AEGON Championships from Queen's Club, which takes place two weeks before Wimbledon. The BBC has covered the tournament since 1979 and has a contract in place until 2024. Coverage is led by Sue Barker with commentary by Andrew Castle, Andrew Cotter, John Lloyd & Peter Fleming. The following week is the WTA AEGON International event from Eastbourne. In 2015, coverage was introduced by John Inverdale and Lee McKenzie with commentary from Andrew Cotter, Sam Smith, Chris Bradnam & Annabel Croft. Both events are primarily shown on BBC Two.

Americans had made a tradition of NBC's "Breakfast at Wimbledon" specials during the tournament on weekends, in which live coverage (which under the guidance of then-NBC Sports executive producer Don Ohlmeyer and associate producer Bob Basche, began in 1979 for the men's rounds and in 1982 for the women) started early in the morning (as the Eastern Time Zone in the United States is five hours behind the United Kingdom) and continued well into the afternoon, interspersed with commentary and interviews from Bud Collins, whose tennis acumen and patterned trousers are well known to tennis fans in the United States. Collins was fired by NBC in 2007, but was promptly hired by ESPN, which holds the Wimbledon cable rights. For many years, NBC's primary host was Dick Enberg, who called his 28th and final Wimbledon in 2011.

=== 1980s ===
The BBC began televising the French Open finals in 1981 (they continued to broadcast the event until 2011) and the finals of the US Open from 1977 until 1987. Channel Four broadcast the US Open finals in 1988. The event returned to UK screens in 1991 when coverage moved to Sky Sports, who broadcast the event for the next 25 years. the BBC televised the later stages of the 1989 Australian Open (they next covered the event in 1995).

From 1980 to 1982, CBS televised the French Open (sandwiched in-between stints at NBC).

In 1982, CBS debuted "Super Saturday". The Men's Semifinals sandwiched the Women's Final, with the first semifinal match starting at 11:00 a.m. Eastern Time.

For the past few decades, the National Football League had always let CBS be the "singleheader" network during the week it televised the Men's US Open Tennis final at 4:05 p.m. Eastern Time around the country (CBS has said that it could not justify putting the Men's US Open Final on Sunday night in terms of ratings; the women's final, broadcast on a Saturday night, often outrated the men's final by a considerable margin, except when at least one American plays in the men's final).

All the courts used by the U.S. Open are lighted, meaning that television coverage of the tournament can extend into prime time to attract higher ratings. This has recently been used to the advantage of the USA Network cable channel and especially for CBS, which used its influence to move the women's singles final to Saturday night to draw higher viewership.

In 1983, Beth Herr lost an epic match to Billie Jean King at Wimbledon 8–6 in the 3rd. Commentators on HBO Breakfast at Wimbledon made a very big deal out of her ability to hit numerous swinging volleys out of the air for winners. This was something that had not been done before especially by a female.

Beginning in 1984, the USA Network served as the longtime American cable home of the US Open, which moved to ESPN2 and the Tennis Channel as of 2009. Universal HD provided the high definition simulcast of USA Network's coverage of the US Open tennis tournament in 2006 and 2007.

On September 11, 1987, Dan Rather walked off the set in anger just before a remote broadcast of the CBS Evening News when it appeared that CBS's coverage of a U.S. Open semifinal match between Steffi Graf and Lori McNeil was going to run into time allotted for the network news program. Rather was in Miami covering the visit to the city by Pope John Paul II, who began a rare U.S. tour. The tennis match ended at 6:32 p.m. Eastern Time, however Rather was nowhere to be found. Over 100 affiliates broadcast the six minutes of dead air that followed before he returned to the broadcast position. Rather later suggested that he intended to force the sports division to fill up the entire half-hour so that he would not have to truncate the elaborately planned coverage of the papal visit. The next day, Rather, anchoring from New Orleans, apologized for leaving the anchor desk.

Eurosport began broadcasting the French Open in 1989. The Roland Garros event has continued to be broadcast on Eurosport until the present day.

=== 1990s ===
As the 1980s ended and the 1990s began, for the first time the three Grand Slam tournaments held outside of the UK were televised in the UK with daily coverage from day one onwards thanks to satellite broadcasting. Sky Sports began their long association with US Open broadcasting in 1991 (Sky merged with BSB in November 1990. BSB had broadcast 1990 US Open on their sports channel). Sky also broadcast the Australian Open from 1991 to 1994. Eurosport broadcast the Australian Open in 1990 and from 1995 onwards. The BBC covered Australian Open finals live from 1995 to 2015, but from 2016 have shown highlights only. The BBC covered the final two days of the 1992 US Open.

By 1991, the men had their first television package to broadcast 19 tournaments. Coming online with their first website in 1995, this was followed by a multi-year agreement with Mercedes-Benz. Lawsuits in 2008, around virtually the same issues, resulted in a restructured tour.

From 1994–2001 (before ESPN, ESPN2 and ESPN Classic took over), USA was the American cable home of the French Open.

While attending the U.S. Open tennis tournament in New York City in September 1995, Jane Bronstein, who is rather large and disfigured from childhood polio and a thyroid condition, was pictured in CBS file footage from the tournament. Although the footage was never intended to be shown to the public, a few seconds of it was shown during a segment on the Late Show with David Letterman. The footage showed Bronstein devouring a peach in a matter of seconds and then handing the peach pit to a man seated beside her with a horrified look on his face. Although the audience and Letterman's fans found the clip hilarious, Bronstein and her attorney Harvey Rothberg were not amused and sued for damages in February 1996. The case was settled in March 1997 for undisclosed terms.

NBC Sports first switched to digital on-screen graphics in 1995, although in a very limited, text-based form. A modernized graphics package for the telecasts rolled out in 1999, based around translucent black rectangles, with beveled gold bars at the top and bottom, with blue accents for most sports (green for golf, purple for Wimbledon, and orange for the tennis French Open).

=== 2000s ===
From 2000-2002, TNT alongside CNN Sports Illustrated (and CNNfn in 2002 due to the former shutting down operations earlier in the year) broadcast same day, weekday coverage (approximately 89 hours of programming with TNT covering about 61 hours in prime time) of Wimbledon, replacing sister network HBO.

In 2001, the Tennis Channel was founded by Steve Bellamy, who soon hired Bruce Rider to head up programming and marketing. A group known as the "Viacom Mafia"—a group that includes Viacom's former CEOs, Philippe Dauman and Frank Biondi, and current CEO, Thomas E. Dooley—became involved in the founding of the channel. This group invested and rounded up additional investors, Bain Capital Ventures, J.P. Morgan Partners, Battery Ventures, Columbia Capital, Pete Sampras and Andre Agassi, who as a group invested about $100 million. These founders felt with other single sports channel like the Golf Channel succeeding with a mostly male demographic and tennis having viewer of both sexes and of a desirable high-end demographic that a tennis channel would draw in advertisers. The channel was launched in early-2003, with its first live event being a Fed Cup tie in Lowell, Massachusetts in April.Barry MacKay (tennis) was one of the original Commentators. In 2004 and 2006, Bravo carried overnight and morning coverage of the Olympic Games from NBC Sports. In 2008, the channel did not carry any coverage, as NBCUniversal had acquired Oxygen, allowing Bravo to continue to carry its regular entertainment programming schedule during NBC's coverage of the Games. For the 2012 Summer Olympics, NBC Sports announced that Bravo would serve as the home of Olympic tennis events, providing 56 hours of coverage.

CBS was the first network to use the MacCam (a system of slow-motion cameras developed by FastCAM Replay LLC and DEL Imaging Systems LLC used during tennis matches to replay close or controversial line calls) widely, as John McEnroe was one of their tennis analysts. The MacCam was first used at the 2004 US Open to demonstrate several poor calls by chair umpires. In Serena Williams' controversial quarterfinal loss to Jennifer Capriati, several poor calls were contested by Williams. Television replays demonstrated that there were actually several crucial calls that were obviously erroneous.

Scoring bugs were still not a permanent feature on NBC, as they disappeared during plays until 2005, when the network introduced horizontal scorebars for its coverage of college football and hockey, which did not match the other graphics. The graphics, which still did not have any animation, were modified in 2002 to feature rounded edges, and the translucent color was changed from black to the color of the accents, which also replaced gold as the border color.

In 2005, Tennis Channel acquired the ATP Tour's Franklin Templeton Tennis Classic in Scottsdale (which it had held the television rights to) from IMG, and moved it to Las Vegas as the Tennis Channel Open in 2006. Tennis Channel moved the open to Las Vegas for 2006, and announced plans to hold women's and junior events alongside it.

Also in 2005, after struggling viewership (having only reached a subscriber base of 5 million by 2006), credited to a lack of coverage of high-profile tournaments (such as the Grand Slam, the channel's management was replaced by a new team led by Ken Solomon. As the channel had not broadcast any of the four Grand Slam tournaments by then. The subscriber base was only 5 million in 2006. On February 1, 2006, Tennis Channel became a charter member of the new Association of Independent Programming Networks. Tennis Channel's senior vice president of distribution Randy Brown was a co-founder of the group, alongside The American Channel's Doron Gorshein.

Outbidding ESPN by double, Tennis Channel acquired cable rights to the French Open in 2006. The network sub-licensed approximately half of the package to ESPN, at a lower cost than ESPN would have paid for the entire tournament. In 2008, Tennis Channel sold the Tennis Channel Open event back to the ATP, citing growth of its core businesses tied to its rapid acquisitions of Grand Slam tournament rights; beginning 2009, Tennis Channel also split cable rights to the US Open with ESPN.

The All England Lawn Tennis and Croquet Club grew frustrated with NBC's policy of waiting to begin its quarterfinal and semifinal Wimbledon coverage until after the conclusion of Today at 10 a.m. local, as well as broadcasting live only to the Eastern Time Zone and using tape-delay in all others. NBC also held over high-profile matches for delayed broadcast in its window, regardless of any ongoing matches. In one notorious incident in 2009, ESPN2's coverage of the Tommy Haas-Novak Djokovic quarterfinal was forced off the air nationwide when it ran past 10 a.m. Eastern, after which NBC showed the conclusion of the match on tape only after presenting the previous Ivo Karlović-Roger Federer quarterfinal in full.

Occasionally, The Late Late Show was split into 15- and 45-minute segments in order to allow CBS to air a daily late-night highlight show for the US Open tennis tournament (as well as the Masters and other PGA Tour events whose broadcast rights are held by CBS). The tournament highlights were broadcast in-between the monologue and the guest segments. However, in mid-2007, the highlights show began airing first, with the full hour of The Late Late Show airing on a delay.

On September 14, 2009, Juan Martín del Potro upset Roger Federer to win the Men's U.S. Open Championship. Dick Enberg hosted the post-match ceremony during which a victorious Del Potro requested to address his fans in Spanish. Enberg declined the request saying that he was running out of time, but went on to list the corporate-sponsored prizes that Del Potro won. A couple of minutes later, Del Potro made the same request again and only then Enberg relented saying "Very quickly, in Spanish, he wants to say hello to his friends here and in Argentina". An emotional Del Potro finally spoke a few sentences in Spanish to a cheering crowd. Many viewers expressed disappointment with Enberg and CBS over the interview. A CBS executive later defended Enberg, noting that the contract with the United States Tennis Association required that certain sponsors receive time during the ceremony.

The BBC has exclusive free to air TV rights for 8 singles matches from the ATP World Tour Finals which includes the semi-final and the final. The BBC covered the event originally between 2009 and 2011, followed by an extension for 2012 and 2013. This was extended again in 2013 through to 2015. It was extended again in 2016 for another 2 years before another deal was announced in 2017 and will run until 2020. with Sky Sports, showing one afternoon match per day including one semi-final and the final which are usually shown on BBC Two.

=== 2010s ===
In 2010, CBS broadcast the U.S. Open in 3D on DirecTV N3D.

In 2011, ITV Sport won the rights from the BBC to show the French Open and showed the event for the first time in 2012. The bulk of the daily coverage was broadcast on ITV4 although both singles finals plus other weekend matches are shown on ITV. However, controversy reigned in 2014 when the main ITV channel stopped coverage of the men's final with four points left and sent the match to ITV4 thus denying viewers recording the match the chance to watch later and those with Freeview in some rural areas (where ITV4 may not be available on Freeview) the chance to see Rafael Nadal win an historic title. This did not deter ITV from immediately renewing its deal to show the tournament and ITV Sport continued to show the French Open until 2021, after which Eurosport will have exclusive coverage of the event in the UK.

The 2011 Wimbledon tournament marked the 43rd and final year of NBC's coverage. NBC issued a statement saying it had been outbid for the rights to future broadcasts, and beginning with the 2012 tournament, all live coverage moved exclusively to ESPN. Wimbledon became the second tennis Grand Slam event (after the Australian Open) to air live coverage in the United States exclusively on pay television, although replays of the tournament finals, and since 2022, live Middle Weekend matches have aired on broadcast network ABC.

On September 4, 2011, during the US Open, Tennis Channel pulled its signal from Verizon FiOS, Cablevision, Suddenlink Communications, Mediacom, WOW!, Knology and General Communication Inc. systems after the providers declined to accept a new agreement that the Tennis Channel made with the National Cable Television Cooperative (a group which the seven providers are members). Along with a fee increase, the agreement also required that the Tennis Channel be moved from their optional sports package to their digital basic tiers. Tennis Channel returned to Verizon FiOS on January 17, 2012.

In July 2012, the Federal Communications Commission ruled in favor of Tennis Channel following a three-year dispute between the network and Comcast over placement on extra-fee sports tier. As a result of the ruling, Comcast was prompted to remove Tennis Channel from its sports package tier, available to customers via an extra charge, and carry the network on the same basic cable tier as Comcast-owned Golf Channel and NBCSN. The FCC found Comcast's previous handling of the network to be discriminatory. This marked the first time that a cable distributor was found to have violated federal anti-discrimination rules. Comcast successfully disputed the ruling in 2013, continuing to carry Tennis Channel on its sports package. The company appealed to the Supreme Court, but was denied a hearing.

In August 2012, CBS Sports Network began to offer additional coverage of the US Open, including replays of classic matches, coverage of qualifying matches, a pre-match show, and coverage of third- and fourth-round matches not shown by CBS.

On August 5, 2012, NBC announced it had extended its broadcast agreement through 2024. Under the terms of this new deal, NBC would broadcast an additional ten hours of live coverage, including matches on Memorial Day and the women's semifinals. With the United States Tennis Association (USTA) agreeing to an eleven-year deal with ESPN for exclusive broadcast rights to the US Open, the French Open will be the only tennis tournament on American network television.

In January 2013, BT Sport signed a deal with the WTA to show 21 live tournaments from the women's tennis tour. The coverage can consist of up to 800 live hours of coverage every year until 2016, each season ending with the TEB BNP Paribas WTA Championships.

In April 2013, Al Jazeera Media Network was speculated as expressing interest in purchasing the channel to complement beIN Sports, though nothing came of this. The channel opened an online store selling professional and lifestyle golfing merchandise and gear on August 14, 2013. The store is operated by Delivery Agent under the Shop TV brand.

On May 17, 2013, ESPN signed a contract (an 11-year deal at $770 million; about $250 million more than CBS was willing to pay) with the United States Tennis Association that would give it the rights to broadcast the U.S. Open starting in 2015, ending CBS's role in covering the tournament after 47 years. At the end of their 2014 coverage, CBS for their closing credits montage, highlighting the greatest moments during their 47-year run with the US Open, used Alicia Keys's "Empire State of Mind (Part II) Broken Down". Without the US Open, CBS's SEC college football coverage was now allowed to start on Labor Day weekend and their National Football League coverage to have a doubleheader in Week 1 of regular season.

ESPN uses ESPN and ESPN2 for US Open broadcasts, while putting outer court coverage on ESPN+.

In 2013, Tennis Channel launched its TV Everywhere service Tennis Channel Everywhere. On May 25, 2014, the network also launched Tennis Channel Plus, a new direct-to-consumer subscription service including coverage of additional events not seen on television, also including digital rights to the French Open outside of the finals. Tennis Channel carriers receive a cut of profits from the service.

For nearly 25 years, Sky Sports was the main broadcaster of the US Open until 2015 but decided not to renew its contract to broadcast this event in 2016. Sky also previously covered Davis Cup tennis but these rights moved to the BBC and Eurosport. Sky was the broadcaster of ATP Tour events from 2002 until 2018, when Amazon Prime Video became the exclusive UK broadcaster. Amazon Prime also cover the US Open.

In 2015, Tennis Channel acquired rights to the Citi Open, an ATP World Tour 500 and WTA International tournament in Washington, D.C., under a four-year contract. The event was formerly part of the US Open Series, but withdrew due to frustration over ESPN (rightsholder of the series due to its new contract to be exclusive broadcaster of the US Open proper) only promising a limited amount of television coverage.

In Europe, the Australian Open tournament is broadcast on Eurosport. Other broadcasters in the region have included the BBC in the United Kingdom, SRG in Switzerland, NOS in Netherlands and RTS in Serbia. In the United Kingdom, the BBC dropped its live coverage of the 2016 tournament just a month before the start due to budget cuts, leaving Eurosport as the exclusive live broadcaster.

Elsewhere, beIN Sports broadcasts it into the Middle East and Northern Africa, and SuperSport in Sub-Sahara Africa. In the United States, the tournament is broadcast on ESPN2, ESPN3 and the Tennis Channel. The championship matches are televised live on ESPN. While it is broadcast on ESPN International in Central and Latin America. It is broadcast on TSN in Canada.

In Asia-Pacific region, the tournament is broadcast on five television networks in China, including national broadcaster CCTV, provincial networks Beijing TV, Shanghai TV and Guangdong TV and English language Star Sports, as well as online on IQIYI Sports. Elsewhere in the region, it is broadcast in Japan by national broadcaster NHK, and pay-TV network WOWOW. In the Indian Sub-continent, Sony Six has broadcast since 2015 and, in the rest of Asia, it is broadcast on Fox Sports Asia through 2021.

France Télévisions and Eurosport held the broadcast rights to the French Open in 2016.

The BBC has a joint deal with Eurosport to show all of Britain's Davis Cup matches for three years to 2017, with coverage predominately broadcast on BBC Two and the Red Button.

As of January 2017, BT Sport have the rights to show 52 WTA tournaments every year until 2019. Coverage is introduced by Annabel Croft with Martina Navratilova and commentary comes from Chris Bradnam, David Law, Sam Smith, Jo Durie and Anne Keothavong.

In France, beIN Sports airs the Wimbledon Championships, Davis Cup, Fed Cup, ATP World Tour Masters 1000, ATP World Tour 500, ATP World Tour Finals, and some ATP World Tour 250 and WTA Tour tournaments.

beIN Sports will be the exclusive broadcaster of WTA Tour in the United States, Spain, Australia, the Middle East, and North Africa from 2017 to 2021.

Following on the trial which commenced with 2018 World Cup the BBC broadcast all Centre Court matches from the 2018 Wimbledon Championships in 4K UHD via iPlayer.

Commentators include John McEnroe, Boris Becker, John Lloyd, Andy Roddick, Martina Navratilova, Nick Mullins, Jonathan Overend, Anne Keothavong, Virginia Wade, Sam Smith, Tracy Austin, Tim Henman, Andrew Castle, Lindsay Davenport, Pat Cash, John Inverdale, Chris Bradnam, Jamie Baker, Dan Lobb, Guy McCrea, Mark Petchey, Simon Reed, Matt Chilton, Peter Fleming, Elizabeth Smylie, Jo Durie, Louise Pleming, Andrew Cotter, Ronald McIntosh and Alison Mitchell. Regular tournament weather updates are provided by Carol Kirkwood.

Beginning with the 2018 tournament, an in-house operation known as Wimbledon Broadcasting Services (WBS) has served as the official host broadcaster of the tournament, replacing BBC Sport.

In October 2018, it was announced that Tennis Channel had acquired rights to the 46 overseas events of the WTA Tour under a five-year deal beginning in 2019, replacing beIN Sports. beIN had acquired the WTA Tour rights as part of a larger deal covering 30 countries, but the deal faced criticism from U.S. viewers due to the network's narrow carriage (only serving half as many households as Tennis Channel, with several top providers having also dropped the channel that August), as well as scheduling conflicts that favored international soccer matches—giving WTA events inconsistent and intermittent coverage.

In 2019, Tennis Channel reached a five-year extension of its rights to the Citi Open. The tournament also re-joined the US Open Series under new ownership.

=== 2020s ===
In 2021, Channel 4 made a last-minute deal with rights-holder Amazon Prime to show live coverage of the final of the 2021 US Open – Women's Singles after Britain’s Emma Raducanu reaches the final. This is the first time since the late 1980s that tennis has been shown on Channel 4.

In September 2021, Eurosport became the exclusive broadcast of the Laver Cup, and will show the event until 2030.

In 2023 Sky Sports decided to return to tennis when it took over as rights holder to the US Open - Amazon Prime had shown the tournament for the previous few years.

Later in 2023, Sky announced that it would be resuming its coverage of the ATP Tour events - it had previously been the rights holder between 2002 and 2018, when Amazon Prime Video became the exclusive UK broadcaster. Sky's deal will see them provide coverage of both the men's and women's events of more than 80 events each year until 2028. The events covered will include the Nitto ATP Finals and WTA Finals, all ATP Masters 1000 and WTA 1000 events, 500s and 250 events (excluding domestic events) and the Next Gen ATP Finals. Gigi Salmon will present the coverage with Tim Henman and Laura Robson being the main pundits. The level of coverage of tennis that Sky now shows has resulted in the launch of a full time channel for the sport - Sky Sports Tennis - which went on air in February 2024.

== See also ==
- Timeline of tennis on UK television
