= Tennis on CBS =

- Genre: Tennis telecasts
- Directed by: Bob Fishman; Jim Cornell
- Presented by: See list of commentators
- Opening theme: "Center Court" by E.S. Posthumus
- Country of origin: United States
- Original language: English
- No. of seasons: 46

Production
- Executive producer: Harold Bryant
- Producers: Bob Mansbach; David Winner
- Camera setup: Multi-camera
- Running time: 180 minutes or until tournament ends
- Production company: CBS Sports

Original release
- Network: CBS
- Release: August 31, 1968 – September 8, 2014
- Network: CBS Sports Network
- Release: 2012 – September 8, 2014
- Release: July 14, 2019 – present

Related
- Tennis on ESPN; Tennis on NBC; Tennis on TNT

Tennis on CBS is the branding used for broadcasts of professional tennis tournaments that were produced by CBS Sports, the sports division of the CBS television network in the United States. At the time the network's broadcast agreements with the United States Tennis Association (USTA) ended in 2014, CBS held the broadcast rights to the U.S. Open, the U.S. Open Series and the Sony Ericsson Open. From 1980 to 1982, CBS also televised the French Open (sandwiched in-between stints at NBC). CBS also during the 1970s and 1980s, broadcast the Grand Prix tennis circuit (including the Pepsi Grand Slam). CBS returned to show tennis coverage again after five years, with both World TeamTennis (2019–2020) and USA matches at the Davis Cup (2020–present)

== U.S. Open coverage ==
CBS Sports broadcast the first US Open Tennis Championships in 1968. Bud Collins called the action alongside Jack Kramer.

James Wall (best known for playing Mr. Baxter on Captain Kangaroo) was also the stage manager for 41 consecutive years on the US Open Tennis Championships telecasts.

On May 17, 2013, ESPN signed a contract (an 11-year deal at $770 million; about $250 million more than CBS was willing to pay) with the United States Tennis Association that would give it the rights to broadcast the U.S. Open starting in 2015, ending CBS's role in covering the tournament after 47 years. At the end of their 2014 coverage, CBS for their closing credits montage, highlighting the greatest moments during their 47-year run with the US Open, used Alicia Keys's "Empire State of Mind (Part II) Broken Down".

Without the US Open, CBS's SEC college football coverage was now allowed to start on Labor Day weekend and their National Football League coverage to have a doubleheader in Week 1 of regular season.

=== Scheduling anomalies ===
In 1982, CBS debuted "Super Saturday". The Men's Semifinals sandwiched the Women's Final, with the first semifinal match starting at 11:00 a.m. Eastern Time.

For the past few decades, the National Football League had always let CBS be the "singleheader" network during the week it televised the Men's US Open Tennis final at 4:05 p.m. Eastern Time around the country (CBS has said that it could not justify putting the Men's US Open Final on Sunday night in terms of ratings; the women's final, broadcast on a Saturday night, often outrated the men's final by a considerable margin, except when at least one American plays in the men's final).

All the courts used by the U.S. Open are lighted, meaning that television coverage of the tournament can extend into prime time to attract higher ratings. This has recently been used to the advantage of the USA Network cable channel and especially for CBS, which used its influence to move the women's singles final to Saturday night to draw higher viewership.

==== Effects from the Jerry Lewis MDA Telethon ====
For several years, due to the overlapping scheduling of the U.S. Open and the Jerry Lewis MDA Labor Day Telethon on Labor Day weekend, many CBS affiliates had to provide alternate scheduling to accommodate one of the events. This issue was resolved in 2011, when all CBS affiliates that had aired the MDA Telethon became able to air the U.S. Open on Labor Day, as the Muscular Dystrophy Association had decided to reduce the telethon (renamed that year as the MDA Show of Strength) was reduced from a 21½-hour broadcast (lasting from the Sunday night before the holiday to the late-afternoon of Labor Day itself) to a six-hour prime time broadcast (airing only on the night before the holiday).

Some CBS stations arranged for co-owned/managed independent stations and affiliates of smaller networks (such as UPN/MyNetworkTV affiliate WHTV in Lansing, Michigan in lieu of WLNS-TV; Fox affiliate KASA-TV in Albuquerque, New Mexico in lieu of KRQE; UPN/The CW affiliate WLYH-TV (now Spanish-language Univision affiliate WXBU) in Lancaster, Pennsylvania in lieu of then-sister station WHP-TV; and MyNetworkTV affiliate WNEM-DT2 in Flint, Michigan in lieu of its parent station's main channel) to carry the network's coverage of the U.S. Open on Labor Day in order to air the telethon.

In other cases, the alternate U.S. Open broadcaster in a given market was unrelated to the local CBS station. In Albany, New York, WB affiliate WEWB-TV (now CW affiliate WCWN, then owned by Tribune Broadcasting) took on the responsibility of airing network coverage of the U.S. Open (as well as other local and network programming) in lieu of Schenectady-based WRGB (then owned by Freedom Communications; WCWN and WRGB are now jointly owned by the Sinclair Broadcast Group) through 2004. Time Warner Cable's Capital District system (which carried it on channel 3) took over the local rights to the tournament in 2005, due to a crop of syndicated program premieres on Labor Day that prevented WCWN from airing the tournament.

=== Additional US Open coverage ===
Occasionally, The Late Late Show was split into 15- and 45-minute segments in order to allow CBS to air a daily late-night highlight show for the US Open tennis tournament (as well as the Masters and other PGA Tour events whose broadcast rights are held by CBS). The tournament highlights were broadcast in-between the monologue and the guest segments. However, in mid-2007, the highlights show began airing first, with the full hour of The Late Late Show airing on a delay.

In August 2012, CBS Sports Network began to offer additional coverage of the US Open, including replays of classic matches, coverage of qualifying matches, a pre-match show, and coverage of third- and fourth-round matches not shown by CBS.

==== Arthur Ashe Kids' Day ====
Arthur Ashe Kids' Day is an annual children's event held by the United States Tennis Association that takes place the last Saturday in August at Arthur Ashe Stadium in Flushing Meadows, Queens, New York. The event, which features professional-amateur charity tennis competitions and features performances from popular music artists, was televised by CBS as a tape delayed broadcast the Sunday after the event; the rights to the Arthur Ashe Kids' Day event moved to ESPN as part of its U.S. Open contract.

=== Technology ===
CBS was the first network to use the MacCam (a system of slow-motion cameras developed by FastCAM Replay LLC and DEL Imaging Systems LLC used during tennis matches to replay close or controversial line calls) widely, as John McEnroe was one of their tennis analysts. The MacCam was first used at the 2004 US Open to demonstrate several poor calls by chair umpires. In Serena Williams' controversial quarterfinal loss to Jennifer Capriati, several poor calls were contested by Williams. Television replays demonstrated that there were actually several crucial calls that were obviously erroneous.

In 2010, CBS broadcast the U.S. Open in 3D on DirecTV N3D.

=== Controversial moments ===
On September 11, 1987, Dan Rather walked off the set in anger just before a remote broadcast of the CBS Evening News when it appeared that CBS's coverage of a U.S. Open semifinal match between Steffi Graf and Lori McNeil was going to run into time allotted for the network news program. Rather was in Miami covering the visit to the city by Pope John Paul II, who began a rare U.S. tour. The tennis match ended at 6:32 p.m. Eastern Time, however Rather was nowhere to be found. Over 100 affiliates broadcast the six minutes of dead air that followed before he returned to the broadcast position. Rather later suggested that he intended to force the sports division to fill up the entire half-hour so that he would not have to truncate the elaborately planned coverage of the papal visit. The next day, Rather, anchoring from New Orleans, apologized for leaving the anchor desk.

While attending the U.S. Open tennis tournament in New York City in September 1995, Jane Bronstein, who is rather large and disfigured from childhood polio and a thyroid condition, was pictured in CBS file footage from the tournament. Although the footage was never intended to be shown to the public, a few seconds of it was shown during a segment on the Late Show with David Letterman. The footage showed Bronstein devouring a peach in a matter of seconds and then handing the peach pit to a man seated beside her with a horrified look on his face. Although the audience and Letterman's fans found the clip hilarious, Bronstein and her attorney Harvey Rothberg were not amused and sued for damages in February 1996. The case was settled in March 1997 for undisclosed terms.

On September 14, 2009, Juan Martín del Potro upset Roger Federer to win the Men's U.S. Open Championship. Dick Enberg hosted the post-match ceremony during which a victorious Del Potro requested to address his fans in Spanish. Enberg declined the request saying that he was running out of time, but went on to list the corporate-sponsored prizes that Del Potro won. A couple of minutes later, Del Potro made the same request again and only then Enberg relented saying "Very quickly, in Spanish, he wants to say hello to his friends here and in Argentina". An emotional Del Potro finally spoke a few sentences in Spanish to a cheering crowd. Many viewers expressed disappointment with Enberg and CBS over the interview. A CBS executive later defended Enberg, noting that the contract with the United States Tennis Association required that certain sponsors receive time during the ceremony.

In 2010, CBS forced the United States Tennis Association to move the final to Monday out of fear that a relatively short Sunday rain delay was going to knock the Sunday men's final into its prime time lineup (in particular, 60 Minutes). Ironically, the rain by early evening had let up and thus, tennis could have been played. While CBS did get its men's final at 4 p.m. as initially scheduled, another rain delay came about at a little after 6 p.m. By that point however, CBS abandoned its tennis coverage in favor of the CBS Evening News. In the meantime, CBS announced that they wouldn't finish broadcasting the match once the delay had ended. Therefore, viewers had to scramble to ESPN2 to watch the conclusion of that particular Novak Djokovic-Rafael Nadal final. And since ESPN2 themselves eventually had to redirect to the second half of its Monday Night Football doubleheader, it awkwardly had to cut off from Nadal's post-match ceremony.

== Commentators ==
=== Play-by-play ===
- Bud Collins (1968–1972)
- Ian Eagle (2008–2014)
- Dick Enberg (2000–2011)
- Frank Glieber (1968–1984)
- Bill Macatee (1995–2014)
- Sean McDonough (1990–1999)
- Ted Robinson (1990–1999)
- Jim Nantz (1987–1995)
- Pat O'Brien (1981–1997)
- Tim Ryan (1978–1997)
- Brent Musburger (1976–1989)
- Vin Scully (1975–1981)
- Ken Squier (1972–2000)
- Pat Summerall (1972–1993)

=== Analysts ===
- Julie Anthony (1976–1984)
- Mary Carillo (1986–2014)
- Jim Courier (2003–2014)
- Julie Heldman (1973–1978)
- Jack Kramer (1968–1973)
- John McEnroe (1992–2014)
- Patrick McEnroe (1997–2014)
- John Newcombe (1978-1987)
- Tony Trabert (1972–2003)
- Virginia Wade (1977-1985)

=== Reporters ===
- Jill Arrington (2000–2003)
- Bonnie Bernstein (1998–2005)
- John Dockery (1996–1999)
- Mary Joe Fernandez (2005–2014)
- Andrea Joyce (1989–1999)
- Summer Sanders (2000–2006)
- Michele Tafoya (1994–1999)
- Lesley Visser (1987–1993)
- Tracy Wolfson (2004–2012)
