= Basche =

Basche is a surname. Notable people with the surname include:

- Bob Basche, American television producer
- David Alan Basche (born 1968), American actor

== See also ==
- Basch
