= Tennis on NBC =

American live sports television series

- Genre: Tennis telecasts
- Presented by: See list of commentators
- Theme music composer: Clark Gault (opening theme); Keith Mansfield (end theme)
- Country of origin: United States
- Original language: English
- No. of seasons: 60

Production
- Executive producer: Don Ohlmeyer
- Camera setup: Multi-camera
- Running time: 180 minutes or until tournament ends
- Production company: NBC Sports

Original release
- Network: NBC
- Release: 1955 – 1964
- Release: 1969 – 2011
- Release: 1975 – 1979
- Release: 1983 – 2024

Related
- Tennis on ESPN; Tennis on CBS

Tennis on NBC is the de facto branding used for broadcasts of major professional tennis tournaments that are produced by NBC Sports, the sports division of the NBC television network in the United States. The network has broadcast tennis events since 1955.

The network's tennis coverage normally airs during the afternoon; however for several weeks in the summer, its Sunday coverage during the morning hours of Grand Slam tennis tournaments may start as early as 8:00 a.m., resulting in the pre-emption of regular programming on that day (such as the political talk show Meet the Press).

== Overview ==
NBC's relationship with tennis dates as far back as August 9, 1939. While at the amateur Eastern Grass Court Championships, in Rye, New York, NBC broadcast the first ever televised tennis match. NBC made history again at the 1955 Davis Cup, where they televised the first tennis match (United States vs. Australia) in color.

=== US Nationals coverage ===
NBC broadcast the US Nationals as early as 1952 and up until 1964. Bud Palmer, Jack Kramer, Lindsey Nelson, Don Budge, Bill Stern and Bill Talbert were among the commentators during this period.

=== Wimbledon coverage ===
NBC broadcast The Championships, Wimbledon beginning 1969, with same-day taped (and often edited) coverage of the Gentlemen's Singles Final..

NBC aired 6.5 hours of taped delayed coverage on Saturday, July 8, 1978, starting with the ladies final, and then the gentleman's final. The ladies final was actually played on Friday, July 7, but was tape delayed by a full day. The gentleman's final was aired on same-day tape delay. Host Jim Simpson was joined by Hilary Hilton during the Woman's Final.

Americans had made a tradition of NBC's "Breakfast at Wimbledon" specials during the tournament on weekends, in which live coverage (which under the guidance of then-NBC Sports executive producer Don Ohlmeyer and associate producer Bob Basche, began in 1979 for the men's rounds and in 1982 for the women) started early in the morning (as the Eastern Time Zone in the United States is five hours behind the United Kingdom) and continued well into the afternoon, interspersed with commentary and interviews from Bud Collins, whose tennis acumen and patterned trousers are well known to tennis fans in the United States. Collins was fired by NBC in 2007, but was promptly hired by ESPN, which holds the Wimbledon cable rights.

For many years, NBC's primary host was Dick Enberg, who called his 28th and final Wimbledon for NBC in 1999 and final one overall in 2011. Enberg regularly concluded the network's coverage of the two-week event with thematically appropriate observations accompanied by a montage of video clips.

The AELTC grew frustrated with NBC's policy of waiting to begin its quarterfinal and semifinal coverage until after the conclusion of Today at 10 a.m. local, as well as broadcasting live only to the Eastern Time Zone and using tape-delay in all others. NBC also held over high-profile matches for delayed broadcast in its window, regardless of any ongoing matches. In one notorious incident in 2009, ESPN2's coverage of the Tommy Haas-Novak Djokovic quarterfinal was forced off the air nationwide when it ran past 10 a.m. Eastern, after which NBC showed the conclusion of the match on tape only after presenting the previous Ivo Karlović-Roger Federer quarterfinal in full.

The 2011 tournament marked the 43rd and final year of NBC's coverage. NBC issued a statement saying it had been outbid for the rights to future broadcasts, and beginning with the 2012 tournament, all live coverage moved exclusively to ESPN. Wimbledon became the second tennis Grand Slam event (after the Australian Open) to air live coverage in the United States exclusively on pay television, although replays of the tournament finals have aired on broadcast network ABC. Live Wimbledon matches have since returned to broadcast television with ABC televising middle weekend matches since 2022

=== French Open coverage ===
NBC's coverage of the French Open began in 1975. Other than a three-year stint for the tournament on CBS, NBC has remained the U.S. broadcast television home of the French Open since 1983. The network shows weekend morning early-round matches in the afternoon on tape-delay; however, if a match is still being played, it will televise the match live. NBC's current deal for the tournament does not allow ESPN2 or Tennis Channel to show NBC's tape-delayed matches. NBC also tape-delays the men's semifinal, broadcasting it in the late morning on the same day, however it broadcasts both finals live.

On August 5, 2012, NBC announced it had extended its broadcast agreement through 2024. Under the terms of this new deal, NBC would broadcast an additional ten hours of live coverage, including matches on Memorial Day and the women's semifinals. With the United States Tennis Association (USTA) agreeing to an eleven-year deal with ESPN for exclusive broadcast rights to the US Open, the French Open was the only tennis tournament on American network television until 2022, when Wimbledon returned to broadcast television on ABC.

In June 2024, it was reported that the U.S. rights to the French Open had been acquired by TNT Sports beginning in 2025, as part of an overall deal with Warner Bros. Discovery that also includes a renewal of its pan-European rights with Eurosport.

Consequently, the men's singles final between Carlos Alcaraz and Alexander Zverev on June 9, 2024 would mark the last French Open match to air on NBC, and the last tennis event overall on the network, for the foreseeable future.

=== Olympic Games coverage ===
In 2004 and 2006, Bravo carried overnight and morning coverage of the Olympic Games from NBC Sports. In 2008, the channel did not carry any coverage, as NBCUniversal had acquired Oxygen, allowing Bravo to continue to carry its regular entertainment programming schedule during NBC's coverage of the Games. For the 2012 Summer Olympics, NBC Sports announced that Bravo would serve as the home of Olympic tennis events, providing 56 hours of coverage.

== Commentators ==
- Julie Anthony (1976–1984)
- Jimmy Arias (2008)
- Tracy Austin
- Don Budge
- Mary Carillo (2003–present)
- Rosie Casals
- Bud Collins (1972–2007)
- Jimmy Connors (1990–1991)
- Donald Dell (1975–1985)
- Noah Eagle (2024–present)
- Dick Enberg (1978–2000)
- Chris Evert (1990–2003)
- Gayle Gardner (1987–1993)
- Mike Gorman (1992)
- Brett Haber (2012, 2016)
- Julie Heldman (1973–1978)
- Dan Hicks (2019–2023)
- Charlie Jones
- Jack Kramer
- Bill Macatee (1982–1989)
- Barry MacKay (tennis) (2008)
- John McEnroe (1992–present)
- Lindsey Nelson
- John Newcombe
- Bud Palmer
- Ted Robinson (2000–2018)
- Tim Ryan
- Jim Simpson (?–1979)
- Bill Stern
- Hannah Storm (1992–2002)
- Bill Talbert
- Maria Taylor (2022–present)
- Mike Tirico (2019)

Jack Kramer commentated for NBC from 1954 to 1962.

From 1968 to 1972, Bud Collins worked for CBS Sports during its coverage of the US Open tournament, moving to NBC Sports in 1972 in time for its Wimbledon coverage. During the 2007 Wimbledon tournament, Collins announced that NBC had declined to renew his contract after 35 years with the network. He insisted that did not plan to retire and would continue to cover tennis for The Boston Globe. Fellow Boston Globe sportswriter Bob Ryan ridiculed NBC's decision on ESPN's The Sports Reporters. Ryan said that the 78-year-old Collins "still has his fastball" and praised the Boston Globe for retaining Collins.

Gayle Gardner worked for NBC from 1987-1993. Among the assignments that she undertook included anchoring NBC's coverage of the French Open and Wimbledon.

Jimmy Connors did commentary with NBC in 1990 and 1991, during its coverage of the French Open and Wimbledon tournaments.

In May 1992, Hannah Storm left CNN and was hired by NBC. She anchored NBC Sports' coverage of Wimbledon and French Open.

Mike Gorman called tennis matches at the 1992 Summer Olympics in Barcelona.

Ted Robinson served as the lead commentator of NBC's tennis coverage from 2000 through 2018. Robinson called the French Open and (through 2011) Wimbledon Championships for NBC. He broadcast the US Open for 22 years on USA Network, receiving acclaim for his partnership with John McEnroe, which continued on NBC and Tennis Channel. The pair also called the men's singles Gold Medal match at the 2012 Summer Olympics, played at Wimbledon.

In May 2003, Mary Carillo joined NBC Sports as an analyst on its French Open and Wimbledon coverage, having made her debut as an analyst on NBC for the 1996 Family Circle Cup tennis event. Carillo's candid and insightful commentary has earned her accolades throughout the industry, including the distinction of being called "the sport's top analyst" by Sports Illustrated. She is known for her deep voice, quick wit and pointed sense of humor. Like her longtime friend and fellow Douglaston, Queens, New York City native John McEnroe, Carillo is known for her colorful turns of phrase, and is credited with coining "Big Babe Tennis" to describe the era in women's tennis dominated by large, powerful players such as Lindsay Davenport, Serena Williams and Venus Williams. Carillo's unabashed and opinionated style of commentary has drawn criticism from several top players, notably Andre Agassi, Serena and Venus Williams, and Maria Sharapova. Nevertheless, she was named Best Commentator by Tennis Magazine (1988–91), Best Commentator by World Tennis magazine (1986) and Broadcaster of the Year by the Women's Tennis Association (1981 and 1985).

Barry MacKay (tennis) served as the play-by-play announcer for the NBC Sports coverage of tennis at the 2008 Summer Olympics in China. Meanwhile, Jimmy Arias served as an analyst for NBC Sports' coverage of Tennis at the 2008 Summer Olympics.

Maria Taylor served as the host for the men's and women's semi-finals and finals during NBC's coverage of the 2022 French Open.

== On-screen graphics ==
NBC Sports first switched to digital on-screen graphics in 1995, although in a very limited, text-based form. A modernized graphics package for the telecasts rolled out in 1999, based around translucent black rectangles, with beveled gold bars at the top and bottom, with blue accents for most sports (green for golf, purple for Wimbledon, and orange for the tennis French Open). Scoring bugs were still not a permanent feature, as they disappeared during plays until 2005, when the network introduced horizontal scorebars for its coverage of college football and hockey, which did not match the other graphics. The graphics, which still did not have any animation, were modified in 2002 to feature rounded edges, and the translucent color was changed from black to the color of the accents, which also replaced gold as the border color.
