= Leslie Statham =

Frank Leslie Statham (18 December 1905 – 28 April 1974), also known by the pen name Arnold Steck, was an English arranger and composer. Statham was born in Knowle, a village near Solihull, Warwickshire. In 1924, he enlisted as a soldier and bandsman in the Royal Scots regiment of the British Army, and was occasionally given to performing as a soloist outside of his military career.

After the war he attended Sandhurst Military Academy, then became a commissioned officer and bandleader of the Welsh Guards Band. In September 1948 he and the band visited Canada to play at the National Exhibition in Toronto. It was estimated that the Band's 127 concerts were attended by nearly one and a half million people and during the course of the engagement the Band played 1174 programme items. The Band made a further visit to the Canadian National Exhibition following the Coronation in 1953. These trips were something of a return engagement for Major Statham, who had been featured as a solo pianist when the Kneller Hall Band had visited Canada in 1931. Major Statham retired from the service in 1962 to concentrate on a career as a composer and arranger. – From the UK Military Bands Website.

(He was) particularly active in the 1950s and 1960s and is remembered mostly for his marches with titles like "Piccadilly", "Birdcage Walk", "Path of Glory" and best known of all as it was the original signature tune for Match of the Day, "Drum Majorette", not to mention other 'production' music' titles for Chappells library such as "Morning Canter" and "Important Occasion".

== Selected works ==
- Skeleton in the Cupboard performed with the Danish State Radio Orchestra conducted by Robert Farnon featuring xylophone – Chappell C 438 1953
- The Linburn Air 1965, Publisher: Chappell Duration: 4:10 mins. Instrumentation: arr. for military band by Leslie Statham
- "Drum Majorette" was used as the original signature tune to the BBC's Match of the Day.
- Today at Wimbledon, closing theme entitled "Sporting Occasion".
