= Davie Brown Entertainment =

- Company type: Private
- Industry: Marketing
- Founded: 1980; 45 years ago in Los Angeles, California
- Founder: Jim Davie
- Headquarters: Marina del Rey, California
- Area served: Los Angeles
- Key people: Tom Meyer, President; Jim Davie, Chairman and CEO
- Products: Props & wardrobe/Product placement
- Parent: Omnicom Group
- Website: www.themarketingarm.com/capabilities/entertainment/

Davie Brown Entertainment was founded in 1980 by Jim Davie, who had created the "Pepsi Challenge" marketing program, and Brad Brown, as the entertainment marketing agency of PepsiCo, which was concerned about how much exposure its primary competitor, The Coca-Cola Company, had in the entertainment space. At the time it was founded, it was known as the "Pepsi-Cola Entertainment Group," according to the book Madison & Vine by Scott Donaton. At the time it was founded, the agency was one of the first product placement and entertainment promotion agencies in the U.S. For the first five years it was in business, the agency worked exclusively for PepsiCo.

Over the next decade, the Los Angeles–based agency expanded its client roster and moved into "brand integration," the planned, pay-for-play arrangement that is guarantees a brand's appearance in particular properties such as TV or film. The agency is credited with the first brand rebate on home video (E.T.), the first commercial on home video (Top Gun), the first animated product placement (Antz), and the first internet promotion (E-Trade/You’ve Got Mail).

Omnicom Group (NYSE: OMS) acquired Davie Brown in September 2001 and added it to The Marketing Arm, a network of marketing services agencies specializing in non-traditional marketing.

Tom Meyer, a former director of marketing at Paramount Pictures, currently serves as president of Davie Brown. Jim Davie remains as chairman and CEO.
