= Davie-Brown Index =

Independent index for brand marketers and agencies

The Davie-Brown Index (DBI) is an independent index for brand marketers and agencies that quantifies consumer perceptions of more than 2,900 celebrities, including TV and film stars, musical artists, reality TV stars, news personalities, politicians, athletes, and business leaders.

Developed in 2006 by Sharp Analytics and white labeled by celebrity talent division of The Marketing Arm, an Omnicom Group Inc. promotion agency, the DBI provides marketers with a systematic approach for quantifying the use of celebrities in their advertising and marketing initiatives. DBI data is designed to help determine a celebrity's ability to influence brand affinity and consumer purchase intent.

According to various news articles, the DBI consists of a 1.5 million-member consumer research panel which evaluates a celebrity’s awareness, appeal and relevance to a brand’s image and their influence on consumer buying behavior. Respondents who are aware of a certain celebrity are asked a standard set of questions about that celebrity. Using a six-point scale, consumers evaluate celebrities across seven key attributes: Appeal, Breakthrough, Trendsetter, Influence, Trust, Endorsement, and Aspiration. An overall DBI score is developed each time a celebrity is indexed and can be narrowed down to key demographics, including gender, age and ethnicity.

Updated weekly, DBI attribute rankings are dynamic and change depending on major events (e.g., industry awards, positive/negative news, etc.).

In 2013, The Marketing Arm partnered with Repucom, a market research firm, to launch the Index in 12 international markets.
