= Band of the Welsh Guards =

Welsh military band active since 1915

Welsh Guards Band
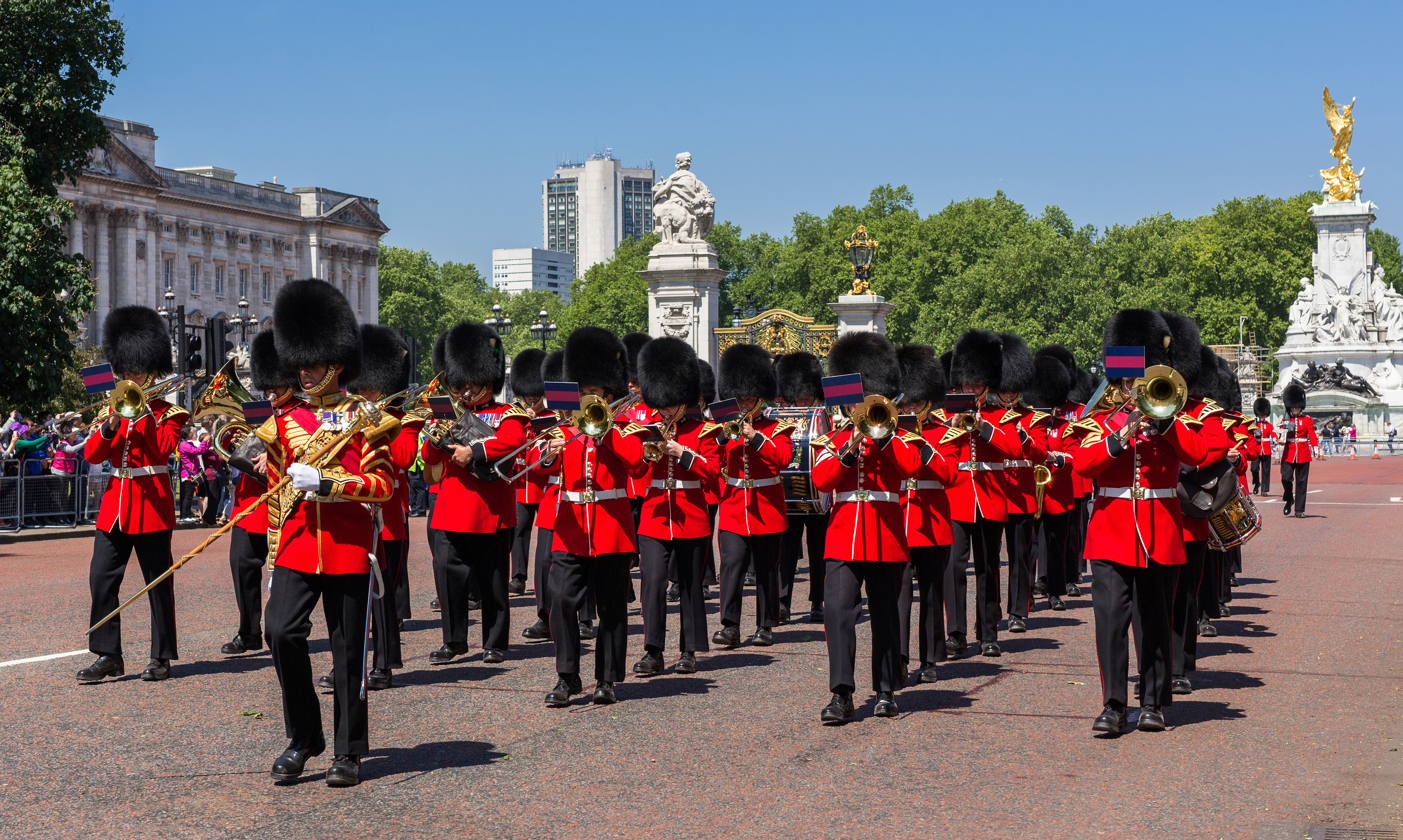

Background information
- Origin: Wales, United Kingdom
- Website: Home of the Welsh Guards Band

The Band of the Welsh Guards is the youngest of the five bands in the Foot Guards Regiments in the Household Division, specifically the Welsh Guards which primarily guards the British monarch.

== History ==
The Welsh Guards Band was formed in 1915, the same year as the regiment. Unlike other Guards Bands such as that of the Grenadier Guards, the band consisted of 45 people, including a Warrant Officer at the time of its inception, with the instruments having been bought by funds provided by the City of Cardiff.

Because the Welsh Guards Band was formed hundreds of years after military music for ceremonial purpose first arose, high standards had already been set by other Guards ensembles. They first publicly performed proving their worth on 1 March 1916, when they mounted the King's Guard.

The Welsh Guards Band started its touring career in 1917, early after its formation. In recent years tours have taken the band to European countries such as Belgium and Spain; North America, with tours to the United States and Canada, and a recent tour to Egypt took the band to northern Africa. The band's first commissioned Bandmaster; Lieutenant Harris; was gazetted on 1 March 1919, to the rank of Lieutenant, after serving with the band in his original position for nearly four years. He remained linked with the band until his retirement.

By 1948 there was a new bandmaster, Leslie Statham who was famed for his compositional prowess by both his real name, and his assumed name Arnold Steck. Under his leadership the band played extensively in Canada to large numbers of people, possibly well over one million, whilst performing hundreds of different items. It is thought that this was off the back of the fact that the Bandmaster had performed at venues visited by the band before as a soloist from the Army School of Music Band, at Kneller Hall. Busy Canadian touring was the start of a long tradition of visiting other countries to play. The most notable tour after this one however, was in 1965, where they visited Milan, to play at "British Week", and were accompanied by the "Pipes, Drums and Dancers" of the Scots Guards for a long tour to America two years later.

The band was honoured with playing at the Investiture of Prince Charles as Prince of Wales in July 1969.

In the early 1970s, at the Band's pinnacle of success so far, in fields such as record contracts and appearances at sporting events, Major Desmond Walker died suddenly only weeks before the Band's planned departure for another Canadian and USA tour. The Tour went ahead as a new Director of Music was hastily appointed in the form of Captain Derek Taylor.

During the 1980s the band continued to tour and to build on its successes, touring to Seattle, Australia, Japan, Paris, Vigo amongst other places. In 1990, the band had its first Director of Music, to be promoted to the rank of Lieutenant-Colonel, Peter Hannam. He gained an MBE two years later then retired in 1993 as the last National Serviceman in Army Music.

Major Lauren Petritz-Watts, appointed as the Director of Music in April 2022, is the first female Director of Music of the band.

== Band membership duties ==
Musicians currently in the band have secondary roles in the British Army as Chemical Decontamination Assistants, Medics and Drivers. The band is based at Wellington barracks in St James's London.

== Regimental Marches ==
The Regimental Quick March is the Rising of the Lark and the Regimental Slow March is Men of Harlech.

== Ensembles ==
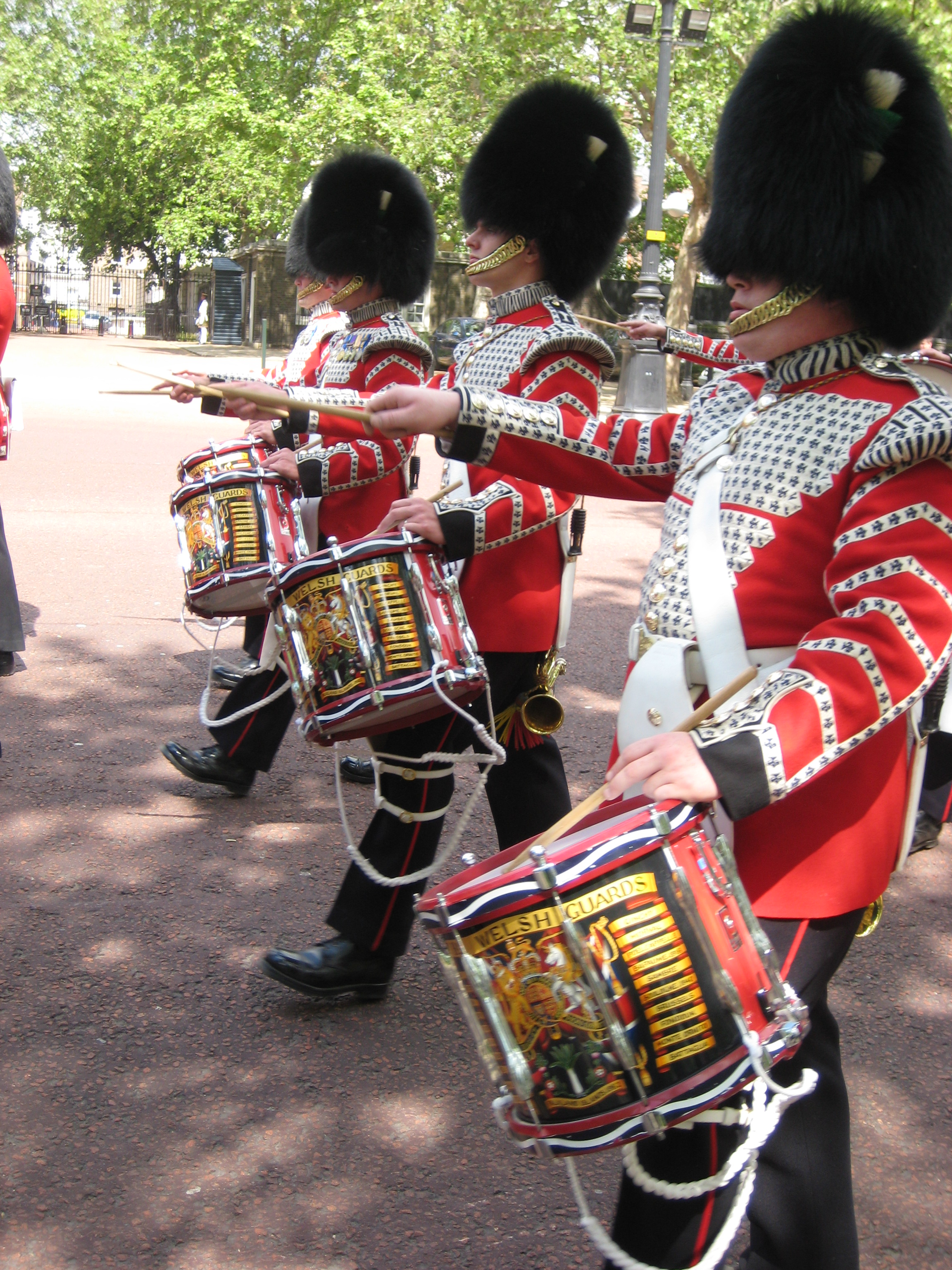
Four Drummers in the Corps of Drums of the Welsh Guards march up the Mall

There are several ensembles within the band of the Welsh Guards:

- Concert band
- Marching band
- Dance Band
- Fanfare Team
- Salon Orchestra

== Functions ==
The band of the Welsh Guards plays regularly for occasions and events as part of the Massed Bands of the Household Division. Some of these events that are most famous are listed below, although this is not a comprehensive list.

- Changing of the Guard
- The Festival of Remembrance
- Trooping the Colour
- Beating the Retreat

The band also performs at other non-military events, including numerous radio and television appearances. The band can be seen near the beginning of the 1956 film, Around the World in 80 Days (even though the film is set several decades prior to the band's formation).

== See also ==
- Band of the Coldstream Guards
- Band of the Grenadier Guards
- Band of the Irish Guards
- Band of the Scots Guards
- Household Division
