= Timeline of tennis on UK television =

This is a timeline of the notable events in the televising of tennis in the United Kingdom.

== 1930s to 1950s ==
- 1937
  - June – The BBC broadcasts television coverage of the Wimbledon Tennis Championships for the first time. Pre-war daily broadcasts were half an hour to an hour in duration.
- 1946
  - From this year, BBC television broadcasts Wimbledon live from 2-3 pm until approximately 7.30 pm. With play starting on centre court after 2pm in those days, this represented a full day's play, though sometimes the coverage was shared with other sports such as cricket and racing, a practice that was to continue until 1998.
- 1950s
  - From 1950 until 1958, short newsreel films of the day's play lasting between five and fifteen minutes narrated by Peter Wilson was shown late in the evening.
- 1956
  - Following its launch the previous autumn, ITV broadcasts coverage from Wimbledon Championships for the first time.

== 1960s ==
- 1964
  - 23 June – Wimbledon: Match of the Day is broadcast for the first time, featuring "recorded highlights of today's outstanding match."
- 1965
  - No events.
- 1966
  - No events.
- 1967
  - 1 July – Wimbledon becomes the first programme to be broadcast in colour. The colour coverage is restricted to BBC2 as it is a further two years before colour broadcasts begin on BBC1. The coverage is, for the first time, hosted by Harry Carpenter. He will return in 1970 and then host live coverage and/or highlights until 1993.
- 1968
  - 6 July – The Wimbledon Championships are shown on ITV for the final time.
- 1969
  - 23 June – The BBC, once again, becomes the exclusive broadcaster of the Wimbledon Championships.

== 1970s ==
- 1970 to 1971
  - No events.
- 1972
  - Undated - A new opening theme tune for the BBC's coverage of Wimbledon was composed by Keith Mansfield and is titled "Light and Tuneful".
- 1973 to 1975
  - No events.
- 1976
  - 18 September - ITV shows the US Open on World Of Sport with highlights of the Men's and Women's Singles Finals, airing the coverage a week after they were played. This is the first British TV coverage of the event.
- 1977
  - 12 September – The BBC broadcasts the US Open for the first time but coverage is restricted to next day highlights of the men's final. It also does the same in 1978.
- 1978
  - No events.
- 1979
  - 14 June – The BBC shows live coverage of the Queen's Club Championships for the first time, and more than 40 years on, the BBC continues to provide extensive live coverage of the event.

== 1980s ==
- 1980
  - No events.
- 1981
  - 7 June – The BBC broadcasts coverage of the French Open for the first time. Coverage is restricted to finals weekend.
  - The BBC covers the closing stages of the US Open for the first time since 1978, now hosted by Des Lynam. The BBC covers the final stages every year until 1987.
- 1982
  - No events.
- 1983
  - No events.
- 1984
  - 25 June – Wimbledon: Match of the Day is broadcast on BBC1 for the first time.
  - 1 September – The BBC expands its coverage of the US Open when it shows highlights of play throughout the second week.
- 1985
  - No events.
- 1986
  - No events.
- 1987
  - 14 September – The BBC shows the US Open for the final time, having shown live coverage of the finals of the event since 1981, although it does show the event once more, in 1992.
- 1988
  - 10 September – Channel Four broadcasts the 1988 US Open.
- 1989
  - January – The BBC televises the Australian Open for the first time. However this turns out to be a one-off and the BBC does not cover the event again until 1995.
  - 5 February – Eurosport begins broadcasting and tennis is the first event to be shown on the channel, when it shows Davis Cup action. Tennis goes on to receive extensive coverage on the channel and from its inception to the present day Eurosport is the principal broadcaster of the French Open in Europe.

== 1990s ==
- 1990
  - 15-28 January - Eurosport covers the Australian Open for the first time.
  - 25 June –
    - Wimbledon: Match of the Day is renamed Today at Wimbledon and for the first time, the programme receives a next morning repeat on BBC2.
    - In addition to the BBC's extensive live coverage, British Satellite Broadcasting broadcasts nightly highlights of the 1990 Wimbledon Championships.
  - 27 August to 9 September – BSB broadcasts daily live coverage of the US Open. This is the first time that the UK has received daily live coverage of this event.
- 1991
  - Sky broadcasts daily coverage of the Australian Open for the first time.
  - Des Lynam takes over from Harry Carpenter as host of live Wimbledon coverage (Lynam had hosted the highlights from 1983 to 1989). Carpenter continues to host the highlights until 1993. Due to exceptionally wet weather in the first week, the BBC broadcasts play on the Middle Sunday for the first time.
  - Sky Sports broadcasts nightly highlights of Wimbledon. This is the only time that the tournament has been broadcast on Sky Sports.
  - 26 August – Sky Sports begins its coverage of the US Open tournament. This is the first major tennis event that Sky Sports covers live and the channel shows live coverage of the entire tournament.
- 1992
  - The BBC shows the US Open for the final time, covering the last two days.
- 1993
  - The BBC extends its daily live coverage of Wimbledon with coverage running until 8.30pm each night.
  - Sue Barker hosts Wimbledon coverage for the BBC for the first time. She co-presents the highlights programme Today at Wimbledon with Harry Carpenter prior to taking over as the programme's sole presenter following Harry's retirement.
- 1994
  - No events.
- 1995
  - Eurosport replaces Sky as the broadcaster of daily coverage of the Australian Open, and continues to hold the rights to the present day. The BBC covers the event for the first time since 1989, initially showing finals only.
  - June
    - The BBC expands its coverage of the French Open when, for the first time, it shows live coverage of the second week. Previously, the BBC's only coverage of the event had been finals weekend, along with occasional coverage of the semi-finals during cricket rain delays.
    - Cable television channel Channel One acquires the rights to air two-and-a-half hours of Wimbledon highlights for the next three-year period of secondary rights.
  - 9 July – For the first time, the BBC shows live coverage of the Wimbledon men's singles final on BBC1. Previously, it had been shown on BBC2 as part of Sunday Grandstand.
- 1996
  - No events.
- 1997
  - Today at Wimbledon moves back to BBC2 and for the first time the highlights programme is given a fixed weekday slot of 9.30pm.
- 1998
  - No events.
- 1999
  - 2 April – Following Britain's elevation to the World Group of the Davis Cup, the BBC starts showing full live coverage of Britain's matches in the tournament. Previously, the BBC had only shown Britain's ties as brief highlights, and on an ad-hoc basis.
  - The launch the previous year of BBC Choice allows the BBC to provide coverage of an alternative match at Wimbledon beyond just after 4pm for the first time.
  - Des Lynam hosts BBC Wimbledon TV coverage for the final time. Sue Barker hosts the live coverage the following year.

== 2000s ==
- 2000
  - ONdigital purchases the rights to the ATP Masters Series and shows live coverage on its ONsport channel.
  - Sky offers digital viewers a choice of live coverage of multiple courts during their US Open coverage for the first time via their red button service.
- 2001
  - BBC offers digital viewers a choice of live coverage of multiple courts during their Wimbledon coverage for the first time - previously the only match choice had been during the early part of the afternoon's play when BBC1 and BBC2 were both broadcasting coverage.
  - 11 August – The ITV Sport Channel replaces ONsport and coverage of the ATP Masters Series moves to the new premium subscription channel.
  - Eurosport broadcasts daily coverage of the US Open for the first time, though Sky continues to have full broadcast rights and Sky shows live Arthur Ashe stadium court action.
- 2002
  - Following the demise of the ITV Sport Channel, coverage of the ATP Masters Series moves to Sky Sports.
- 2003
  - No events.
- 2004
  - No events.
- 2005
  - Today at Wimbledon is moved to the earlier start time of 8.30pm with live coverage transferred to the BBC Red Button at this point.
- 2006
  - Today at Wimbledon is moved to the earlier start time of 8pm. Consequently, the programme is not broadcast if major matches are still in progress and on other days, live tennis transfers at 8pm to the BBC Red Button.
- 2007
  - High-definition television coverage of Wimbledon is broadcast by the BBC for the first time. The BBC HD channel shows continual live coverage during the tournament of Centre Court and Court No. 1 as well as the evening highlights show Today at Wimbledon.
- 2008
  - No events.
- 2009
  - December – The BBC broadcasts the end of year ATP Finals for the first time.

== 2010s ==
- 2010
  - No events.
- 2011
  - No events.
- 2012
  - 27 May – ITV Sport takes over as terrestrial broadcaster of the French Open. ITV shows full live coverage, mainly on ITV4, as opposed to the partial coverage shown by the previous rights holder, the BBC. This is the first time since 1968 that ITV has shown coverage of one of the sport's big four tournaments.
- 2013
  - No events.
- 2014
  - January – BT Sport replaces Sky Sports as broadcaster of the Women's Tennis Association.
  - June – BT Sport broadcasts men's tennis for the first time when it shows live coverage of the AEGON Championships tennis tournament from Queen's Club.
- 2015
  - June – The BBC's Wimbledon Tennis Championships highlights programme changes format and name, to Wimbledon 2day, with a new lighthearted magazine format, but after only one year, the format was abandoned for 2016.
  - September – Sky Sports shows coverage of the US Open for the final time, having shown the event every year since 1991. It had decided not to bid for the rights to the 2016 tournament.
- 2016
  - 27 June – Eurosport shows live and recorded coverage of the Wimbledon Tennis Championships, thereby becoming the first commercial pay-TV broadcaster to air live UK coverage from the All England Club. Its live coverage is restricted to the finals weekend.
- 2017
  - May – Dave replaces Sky Sports as broadcaster of tennis' Tie Break Tens tournament.
  - 28 August to 10 September – Eurosport shows the US Open for the final time. It had held exclusive rights to the past two tournaments and prior to this it had obtained secondary rights to the event with Sky Sports being the main rights holder.
- 2018
  - 18 June – Amazon Prime's first live sport in the UK is the Queen's Club tennis tournament.
  - 27 August – Amazon Prime broadcasts the US Open for the first time. This is the first time that a major sporting event has only been available via a streaming-only platform.
  - December – Sky Sports’ coverage of tennis ends after it loses the rights to the ATP Tour to Amazon Prime.
- 2019
  - 3 November – BT Sport ends its coverage of the WTA after it loses the rights to Amazon Prime.
  - November – The BBC loses the rights to Britain's Davis Cup tennis matches to Eurosport, having held them since the late 1990s.

== 2020s ==
- 2020
  - 6 January – Amazon Prime Video expands its coverage of tennis when it takes over as the UK broadcaster of the WTA, showing 49 tournaments a year.
  - 29 June-12 July – Following the cancellation of the 2020 Wimbledon Championshipsdue to COVID-19 pandemic, the BBC shows reruns of classic matches during what would have been the Wimbledon fortnight.
- 2021
  - 13 June – ITV broadcasts the French Open for the final time following Eurosport gaining exclusive rights to the event from 2022 onwards.
  - 11 September – Channel 4 does a last-minute deal with rights-holder Amazon Prime to show live coverage of the final of the 2021 US Open – Women's Singles after Britain's Emma Raducanu reaches the final. This is the first time since the late 1980s that tennis has been shown on Channel 4.
  - 24–26 September – Eurosport becomes the exclusive broadcaster of the Laver Cup, and will show the event until 2030.
- 2022
  - June – For the first time, there is no free-to-air coverage of the French Open as all live and recorded coverage is shown only on Eurosport.
  - 27 June – For the first time since 1983, the BBC schedules live evening coverage of Wimbledon on BBC One to try to reduce the disruption caused to the BBC's schedules due to last moment decisions to transfer live coverage from BBC Two to BBC One
  - 10 July – Sue Barker hosts the coverage for the last time, after nearly 30 years. Originally presenting the highlights, she had been the main presenter of the live coverage since 2000.
- 2023
  - July – Clare Balding takes over as the BBC's main presenter of its live television coverage of Wimbledon, with Isa Guha presenting the first few hours live most days.
  - 28 August – The US Open returns to Sky Sports.
- 2024
  - January – Coverage of the ATP Tour and WTA Tour returns to Sky Sports, having been with Amazon Prime for the previous five years.
  - 11 February – Sky Sports launches a full time tennis channel, Sky Sports Tennis.
- 2025
  - The closure of Eurosport on 28 February sees Eurosport's tennis coverage transfer to TNT Sports.

== See also ==
- Sports broadcasting contracts in the United Kingdom
