= Millsport LLC =

U.S. sports marketing agency

- Industry: Marketing
- Founded: 1975
- Founder: James R. Millman

Millsport was one of the first sports marketing agencies in the United States. Founded in 1975 by James R. Millman, a 25-year-old event marketing executive with Philip Morris, Inc., Millsport gained notability for its involvement in Olympic and NFL sponsorship in the 1990s by Visa, GTE, Pepsi, Frito-Lay and others.

== History ==
Millman, an Ohio University grad who began his career in 1968 as a production assistant with ABC Sports, served as the agency's chairman and CEO until 2004. In 1981, Millsport joined advertising agency Doyle Dane Bernbach (now DDB), one of the largest ad agencies in the U.S.

Six years later, Millsport left Doyle Dane Bernbach to once again become an independent agency. In 1995, Millsport and Omnicom's Diversified Agency Services division formed a new sports marketing partnership. It marked Omnicom's first venture into sports marketing, and, under Millman's leadership, the firm achieved the strongest record of long-term client retention in the sports industry. In 2002, Millsport VP Mike Bartelli opened an office in Charlotte, N.C., dedicated to its Motorsports practice. The following year, Bob Basche, a managing partner in the business, was promoted to CEO, replacing Millman, who remained as chairman.

Millsport became the sports sponsorship and motorsports consulting and activation division of fellow Omnicom agency The Marketing Arm in 2004, a move that triggered several personnel moves within the agency. Howard Jacobs was promoted from senior VP/marketing and business development to president of Millsport. Basche moved to chairman of Millsport and chief relationship officer for The Marketing Arm, while Millsport founder James Millman left the company to launch a new agency in partnership with Omnicom, called Partnership Marketing Connection (PMC).

In 2006, Dan Belmont joined Millsport as president, replacing Howard Jacobs, who left to join Millsport client XM Satellite Radio as SVP of strategic partnership marketing. In 2008, Bartelli was named President, Motorsports. He left later that same year, joining Petty Holdings as CMO.
