= Bob Basche =

American television producer

Bob Basche was a former Emmy Award-winning associate producer for NBC's Sportsworld. Basche, who also served as head of talent and on-air promotion, is credited for coining the term "Breakfast at Wimbledon," which is used to promote the first live broadcast of the Wimbledon Finals in the early morning time slot. Basche also played a key role in developing NBC's on-air talent roster, including Bryant Gumbel, Dick Enberg and Bob Costas.

Prior to NBC Sports, Basche worked for the men's ATP Tour and the LPGA, where he served as that organization's first director of public relations. He also worked as the communications director for the Philip Morris sports group's Virginia Slims Tennis Tour.

A graduate of the University of Notre Dame who served as a Naval officer during the Vietnam War, Basche joined Connecticut-based sports marketing firm Millsport LLC as executive vice president and managing partner in 1982. Today, he serves as chairman of Millsport, a division of The Marketing Arm.
