= The Marketing Arm =

American marketing agency

TMA (The Marketing Arm)
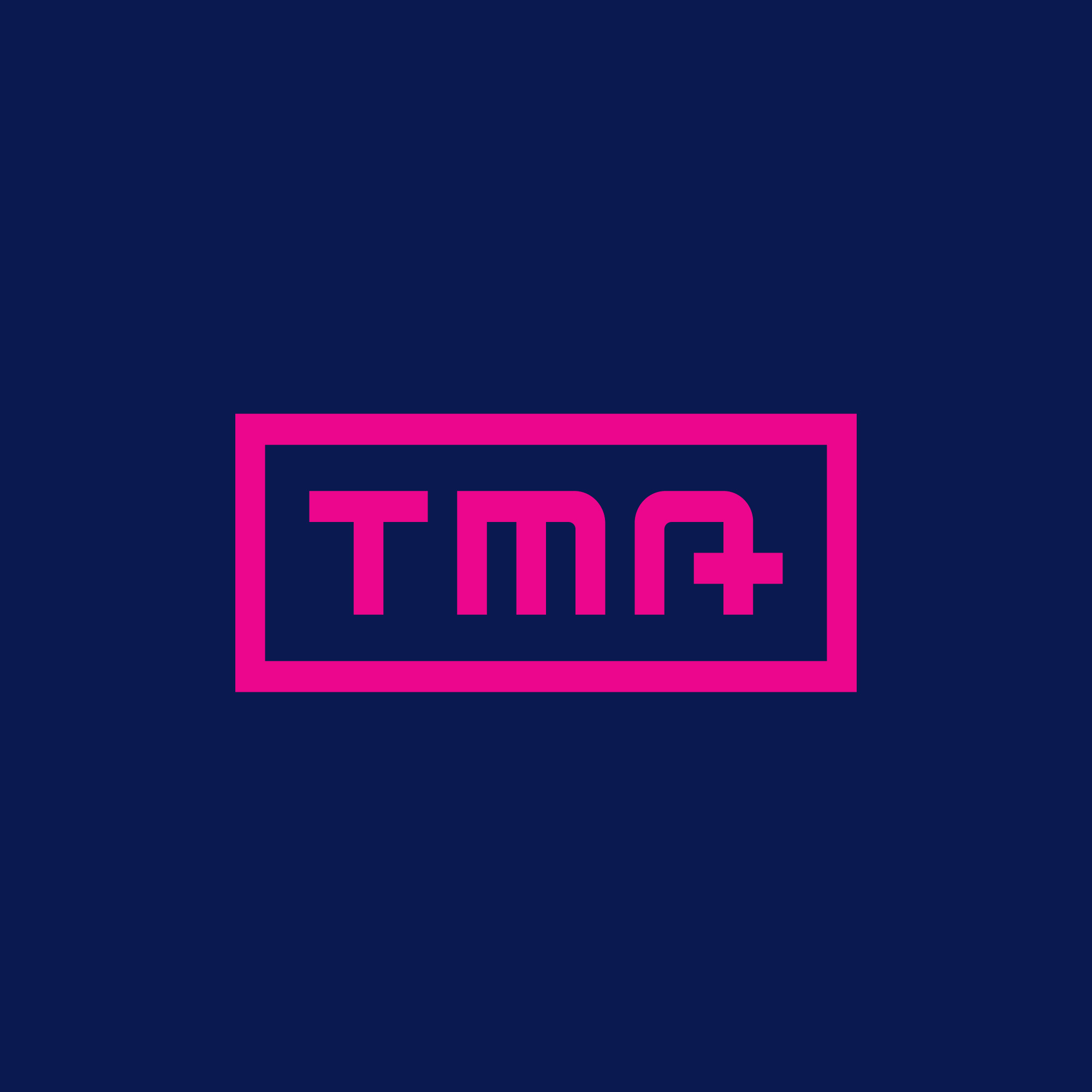
- Industry: Marketing & Advertising
- Founded: 1992
- Founder: Ray Clark
- Parent: Omnicom Group
- Website: wearetma.com

TMA (The Marketing Arm) is a marketing and creative agency owned by Omnicom Group.

== History ==
Founded in 1993 by Ray Clark, a former ProServ and Talent Sports International executive, The Marketing Arm was created as the event and corporate sports marketing division of Athletic Resource Management Inc. (ARM), a Memphis-based sports agency headed by Jimmy Sexton and Kyle Rote, Jr., a former professional soccer player in the NASL.

Omnicom Group acquired The Marketing Arm in June 1999.

In 2003, The Marketing Arm joined event operations with U.S. Marketing & Promotions (Usmp), an Omnicom sister agency based in Torrance, Calif. founded by Jason Moskowitz and Michael Napoliello. Usmp now serves as The Marketing Arm's event unit, specializing in field sales and experiential marketing.

In 2004, The Marketing Arm merged its sports consulting division with Millsport, a sports marketing firm owned by Omnicom, to form an agency retaining the Millsport brand name. Founded in 1975 by Jim Millman, Millsport used sports sponsorship as a branding tool.

In 2004, Los Angeles-based agency Davie Brown Entertainment, which was founded in 1985 and acquired by Omnicom in 2001, joined The Marketing Arm. In 2006, Davie Brown's talent division created the Davie-Brown Index (DBI), a celebrity index that determines a celebrity's ability to influence brand affinity and consumer purchase intent.

In October 2005, mobile marketing agency Ipsh! joined The Marketing Arm. Ipsh! was founded in June 2001 by Nihal Mehta and Mike Jelley. Ipsh creates and manages mobile marketing campaigns including SMS, MMS, mobile gaming, application development, mobile websites, and media planning and buying.

In 2011, Omnicom acquired Fanscape, a social media agency, and merged it into The Marketing Arm.

In March 2016, Platinum Rye Entertainment (PRE), a sports and entertainment marketing consultancy specializing in sourcing celebrity talent, became part of TMA.

In 2016, Alcone, an Omnicom agency specializing in promotional, shopper and retail marketing, became a part of TMA.

In 2019, Andrew Robinson was promoted from TMA's president to CEO.

In September 2022, TMA updated its branding with new colors, fonts, designs, and a new web domain and social media handle, wearetma.agency. The rebrand was covered by Adweek.

In January 2023, Trina Roffino was promoted from TMA's president to CEO.

== Operations ==
The company lists offices in New York City; Los Angeles; Chicago; Dallas; Wilton, Connecticut; Irvine, California; London; Manchester; São Paulo; and Shanghai. The agency self reports that it specializes in strategy and execution across sports and entertainment, experiential, celebrity and influencer, digital and social, shopper and promotion, and content production.

== In popular culture ==
In late 2019, State Farm named TMA its new creative agency. TMA’s first ad for the brand brought back Jake from State Farm in February 2020, with Kevin Miles cast as the new Jake. TMA led the creative for State Farm’s first in-game Super Bowl spot in 2021, which featured Patrick Mahomes, Aaron Rodgers, Paul Rudd, and Drake, who served as Jake from State Farm’s stand-in.

The agency is credited with creating the Doritos "Crash the Super Bowl" promotion, which has earned a Gold Lion at the Cannes Lions International Advertising Festival.

In 2013, the agency won two Lions at Cannes for its work on the "Uncle Drew" film for Pepsi Max.
