= Tennis on TNT Sports =

Broadcasts of tennis by TNT Sports

TNT Sports (formerly Turner Sports) has occasionally televised tennis coverage on its networks in the United States, primarily TNT. Both of its broadcast packages to-date have been rights to Grand Slam events, including holding rights to Wimbledon from 2000 to 2002, and acquiring American rights to the French Open in 2025 in conjunction with the British TNT Sports networks and pan-European Eurosport networks.

== History ==
From 2000 to 2002, Turner Sports held cable rights to the Wimbledon Championships alongside broadcast network NBC; TNT would broadcast 61 hours of daytime coverage over the length of the tournament, while CNN/SI would carry a nightly prime time block. At the time, it was the third major sports property to be split between NBC and Turner, including the NBA and NASCAR. In 2002, with the closure of CNN/SI earlier in the year, its share of the coverage moved to CNNfn. The package replaced coverage that had been carried by sister division HBO Sports for 25 years. The cable rights moved to ESPN2 in 2003, followed by exclusive rights to the entire tournament in 2012.

In June 2024, TNT Sports acquired the American rights to the French Open, in a multi-year deal (through 2034) that also includes a renewal of Warner Bros. Discovery's pan-European rights to the tournament with TNT Sports (UK), Eurosport, and WBD-owned free-to-air channels in some European territories. The coverage is being co-produced by TNT Sports' European and American operations, with talent and resource sharing between the divisions, and separate studio segments being produced for the American and British telecasts. The majority of television coverage is airing on TNT, with all matches streaming on HBO Max, and TruTV carrying a daily "whiparound" show carrying rolling coverage from across all courts.

== Commentators ==
=== Wimbledon (2000–2002) ===
- Marv Albert (men's play-by-play)
- Mary Carillo (analyst/reporter/women's play-by-play)
- Jim Courier (men's analyst)
- Zina Garrison (women's analyst)
- Jim Huber (essayist)
- Ernie Johnson Jr. (studio host)
- Phil Jones (reporter)
- Barry MacKay (women's play-by-play)
- Martina Navratilova (women's analyst)

=== French Open (2025–present) ===
==== Play-by-play ====
- Brian Anderson (2025–present)
- Alex Faust (2025–present)
- Patrick McEnroe (2025–present)
- Mark Petchey (2025–present)

==== Analysts ====
- John McEnroe (2025–present)
- Lindsay Davenport (2025–present)
- Jim Courier (2025–present)
- Chris Evert (2025–present)
- Caroline Wozniacki (2025–present)
- Sam Querrey (2025–present)
- Darren Cahill (2025–present)

==== Reporters ====
- Sloane Stephens (2025–present)
- Mary Joe Fernandez (2025–present)

==== Studio ====
- Adam Lefkoe (Host) (2025–present)
- Andre Agassi (Analyst) (2025–present)
- CoCo Vandeweghe (Analyst) (2025–present)

==== Contributors ====
- Venus Williams (2025–present)
