= John Inverdale =

British broadcaster

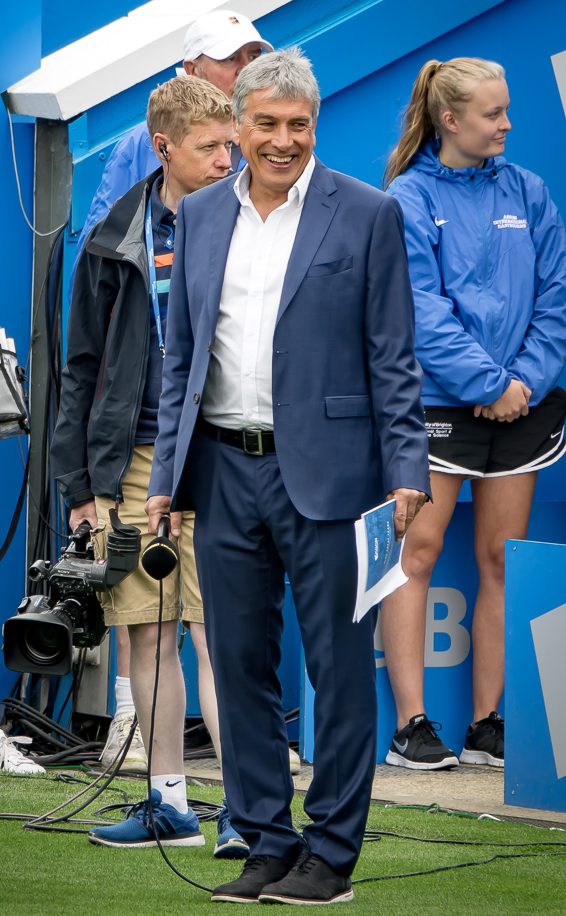
- Inverdale (front) in 2017
- Born: John Ballantyne Inverdale; 27 September 1957 (age 69); Plymouth, Devon, England
- Education: Clifton College, Cardiff Metropolitan University, University of Southampton
- Occupations: Television and radio presenter
- Years active: 1980–present
- Employer(s): BBC Sport, ITV Sport
- Spouse: Jackie Inverdale
- Children: 2

John Ballantyne Inverdale (born 27 September 1957) is a British broadcaster who works for both the BBC and ITV.

During his radio career, he has presented coverage of many major sporting events including the Olympic Games, Wimbledon, the Grand National and the FIFA World Cup. He was the main television presenter of Today at Wimbledon until 2014 and has hosted television coverage of sports programmes including Rugby Special and Grandstand. He has presented ITV's coverage of the Rugby World Cup and the French Open.

Since 2013, Inverdale has been involved in several broadcasting controversies, which have prompted criticism as well as articles written in his defence.

== Early life ==
Inverdale was born in Plymouth, Devon, the son of Royal Navy dental surgeon Captain John B. Inverdale, CBE, who played rugby union for Devonport Services, and Stella Norah Mary Westlake, née Richards. Inverdale was educated at Clifton College in Bristol and at the University of Southampton, graduating with a history degree in 1979. He was the editor of the student newspaper Wessex News (now Wessex Scene) and captained the university's tennis team for two years.

After gaining a post-graduate journalism qualification at University of Wales Institute, Cardiff, he began his career with two years at the Lincolnshire Echo in 1980, and then joined BBC Radio Lincolnshire in 1982.

== Broadcasting career ==
=== Radio ===
Inverdale began to work on the BBC's national radio stations in 1985, firstly on Radio 2's sports unit where he presented the final edition of Sport on 2 in August 1990, then between 1990 and 1994 at Radio 5, where he presented the flagship sports programme Sport on 5.

On 25 November 1993, Inverdale took over as presenter of Radio 5's drivetime show and he continued to host the same slot when Radio 5 Live replaced Radio 5 the following March, and the show was renamed from John Inverdale's Drive-In to John Inverdale Nationwide. He presented the programme until 1997, for which he was named Sony Broadcaster of the Year in 1997. At 5 Live, he hosted the topical show, Any Sporting Questions, a variation on Radio 4's Any Questions, and similarly toured the UK each week. In 2008 he broadcast for 5 Live from the Olympic Games in China. Along with Sir Steve Redgrave he appeared at Shunyi Rowing Lake for the Olympics in Beijing.

Inverdale hosted 5 Live's coverage of the Wimbledon, Olympic and Commonwealth Games, football and rugby union World Cups, World Athletics Championships, Ryder Cup, Open Championship, London Marathon and Cheltenham Festival.

He has also hosted the station's coverage of BBC Sports Personality of the Year and occasionally guest presented on Radio 2.

Inverdale left 5 Live in March 2019.

In 2019, Inverdale provided radio commentary to Japan 2019 Rugby World Cup matches via the official audio commentary available through the TuneIn radio platform.

=== Television ===
Inverdale worked on British Satellite Broadcasting's Sports Channel and then for Sky Sports during the channel's early years, including as presenter of Goals On Sunday and on their coverage of Serie A Italian football, where Alan Hansen regularly appeared alongside him as studio pundit.

Inverdale has also worked regularly for BBC Television. At the Manchester 2002 Commonwealth Games, Inverdale presented coverage of the games for the BBC. He became the BBC's main Rugby Union anchor in the 2006 Six Nations Championships following the departure of Steve Rider to ITV Sport. He led ITV's Rugby World Cup coverage in 2015. He hosted BBC One's sports chat show, On Side between 1997 and 2001. For the Delhi 2010 Commonwealth Games, he was one of the main presenters of the BBC's coverage. He presents the BBC's World Cup and Olympic Rowing coverage alongside Sir Steve Redgrave, including at the London 2012 Games. In October 2012, he filmed several episodes of Channel 4 show Countdown. Inverdale has hosted ITV's live French Open coverage from Roland Garros since 2012. For the Rio 2016 Olympics, Inverdale hosted the BBC's coverage of rowing, boxing and rugby seven events.

From 2000 to 2014 he presented Today at Wimbledon, BBC Two's nightly tennis highlights, until the format changed in 2015. This was mainly due to the 2013 Marion Bartoli controversy which led the BBC to drop Inverdale from the show. However, the new version Wimbledon 2Day hosted by Clare Balding was ridiculed by the public. Such was the unpopularity of Wimbledon 2Day, a Twitter campaign called "bring back John Inverdale" attracted thousands of supporters, with Inverdale claiming that he had "never been so popular." The highlights show was dropped in 2016 and rebranded its original title, Today at Wimbledon. Inverdale was a member of the main commentary team until 2023, but did not return in 2024.

He appeared as himself in five episodes of 2016 BBC Three comedy Witless as the presenter of 'Witpro', a spoof video series about witness protection.

Inverdale stepped down from anchoring the BBC's rugby coverage in March 2021.

== Controversies ==
Owing to his involvement in multiple broadcasting controversies, Inverdale has been dubbed as "gaffe-prone".

=== Marion Bartoli ===
On the day of the 2013 Wimbledon Ladies Final featuring Marion Bartoli and Sabine Lisicki, Inverdale remarked during a pre-match discussion on BBC Radio 5 Live that Marion Bartoli's father may have told her she wasn't conventionally attractive like Maria Sharapova and would need determination to succeed. His comments sparked criticism, with accusations of sexism on social media.

Bartoli later downplayed the issue, stating her focus was on winning Wimbledon not her appearance. Inverdale later apologised publicly and in a letter, with the BBC also issuing an apology. The BBC received hundreds of complaints, and Culture Secretary Maria Miller raised concerns with its director general. A year later, Bartoli said she never took the comments negatively, while Inverdale suggested Miller's response had political motives.

=== 2016 Summer Olympics ===
Inverdale received "intense criticism" while presenting the BBC's coverage of the 2016 Summer Olympics in Rio de Janeiro. He and his co-host, Olympic rower Steve Redgrave, were reported to have "clashed" several times on television, with Redgrave allegedly being afforded little opportunity to speak. The talkative Inverdale called Redgrave Oddjob, the silent Bond villain as a reference to Redgrave's quiet personality. This led to negative social media commentary of Inverdale. Redgrave was observed directing jibes toward Inverdale, shaking a wet umbrella over his head and even walking off the set. The BBC denied any hostility between the two.

Following the men's tennis gold medal final, Inverdale congratulated Andy Murray on being the first tennis player to win two gold medals; although Murray is the first player to lift two singles golds, Serena and Venus Williams had previously won four golds each between singles and doubles tennis. Inverdale's comment was criticised as sexist and also brought the 2013 Marion Bartoli controversy back to the fore on social media. The BBC stated that the comment was "a simple error". Following the incident, Telegraph journalist Rob Bagchi wrote a piece titled "Why does everyone hate John Inverdale?", in which he defended Inverdale and suggested that critics were enjoying "the vicarious thrill in a sustained pile-on". The article was shared on Twitter by broadcaster Jeremy Vine.

Inverdale experienced further censure when he was accused of "ignoring" British heavyweight boxer Anthony Joshua during an interview. Some defended Inverdale, saying he was attempting to catch the eye of French boxer Sarah Ourahmoune, whom they had been speaking of; she eventually joined them to talk.

On the final day of the Olympics coverage, Inverdale was criticised again during a boxing broadcast when he interrupted Joshua to speak about the victorious French boxer Tony Yoka and claimed that Yoka and his partner might have become the first engaged or married couple to both win gold medals at the same Olympics, in spite of British cyclists Laura Trott and her fiancé Jason Kenny both having won golds just days earlier, and married couple Kate Richardson-Walsh and Helen Richardson-Walsh having both won gold medals in the women's hockey just two days prior.

The day after this final Rio 2016 controversy for Inverdale, Mark Davies of The Spectator penned an article titled "In defence of John Inverdale", in which he wrote that the broadcaster had been subjected to a large volume of "totally unwarranted" censure. Davies felt it was "clear" what Inverdale meant during the Murray and Yoka incidents and was doing "what all broadcast interviewers do" during the Joshua episode by looking for future interviewees.

=== Other ===
During a 2014 BBC One broadcast, Inverdale said that England – rather than Great Britain – would play the United States of America in that year's Davis Cup; he apologised later in the programme. The comment nevertheless sparked complaints from viewers who found it to be "inaccurate and biased". The BBC called it an "unintentional slip".

During BBC Radio 5 Live's coverage of the 2015 Cheltenham Festival, Inverdale said "rose-cunted" on air, in reference to glasses. He swiftly apologised, attributing his language to a "slip of the tongue". Ben Rumsby in The Telegraph called Inverdale's mistake "a genuinely unfortunate mangling of the words 'coloured' and 'tinted'".

At the 2016 Wimbledon Championships, Inverdale commented that tennis player Nick Kyrgios "lumbered off like a character from The Jungle Book", which led to allegations of racism on social media. The BBC declined to comment on the incident, beyond describing the number of complaints received as "small".

== Awards and personal life ==
Inverdale received a Doctor of Letters honorary degree from the University of Southampton in July 2001. He was awarded an honorary fellowship to the University of Wales Institute, Cardiff (UWIC) in November 2009.

Inverdale lives in Kingston upon Thames with his wife and two daughters. He made national news in 2005 when his face appeared in many newspapers showing the scars he received whilst playing rugby union for Esher. He is a fan of both Southampton and Lincoln City football clubs.

In 2005 Inverdale became a patron of charity Cardiac Risk in the Young.
