= Tennis on HBO =

Television series

Tennis on HBO is a television program produced by the premium cable television network HBO that broadcasts the main professional tennis tournaments in the United States. In 1975, HBO began airing coverage (same day, weekday coverage only) of Wimbledon and did so until 1999. In 2009, HBO broadcast the inaugural Billie Jean King Cup.

== Notable moments ==
In 1983, Beth Herr lost an epic match to Billie Jean King at Wimbledon 8–6 in the 3rd. Commentators on HBO Breakfast at Wimbledon made a very big deal out of her ability to hit numerous swinging volleys out of the air for winners. This was something that had not been done before especially by a female.

== Commentators ==
- Arthur Ashe 1981-1992
- Michael Barkann
- Mary Carillo: Carillo worked as both a host and analyst on HBO's Wimbledon coverage from 1996 to 1999.
- Zina Garrison: Garrison served on HBO's coverage of the 1998 and 1999 Wimbledon Championships.
- Julie Heldman
- Billie Jean King 1984-1999
- Jim Lampley: In 1987, he began working for HBO, covering boxing and HBO's annual telecast of Wimbledon.
- John Lloyd
- Barry MacKay (tennis)
- Martina Navratilova: She worked as an analyst on HBO's coverage of the Wimbledon Championships from 1995 through 1999.
