= Andrew Cotter =

Scottish sports broadcaster

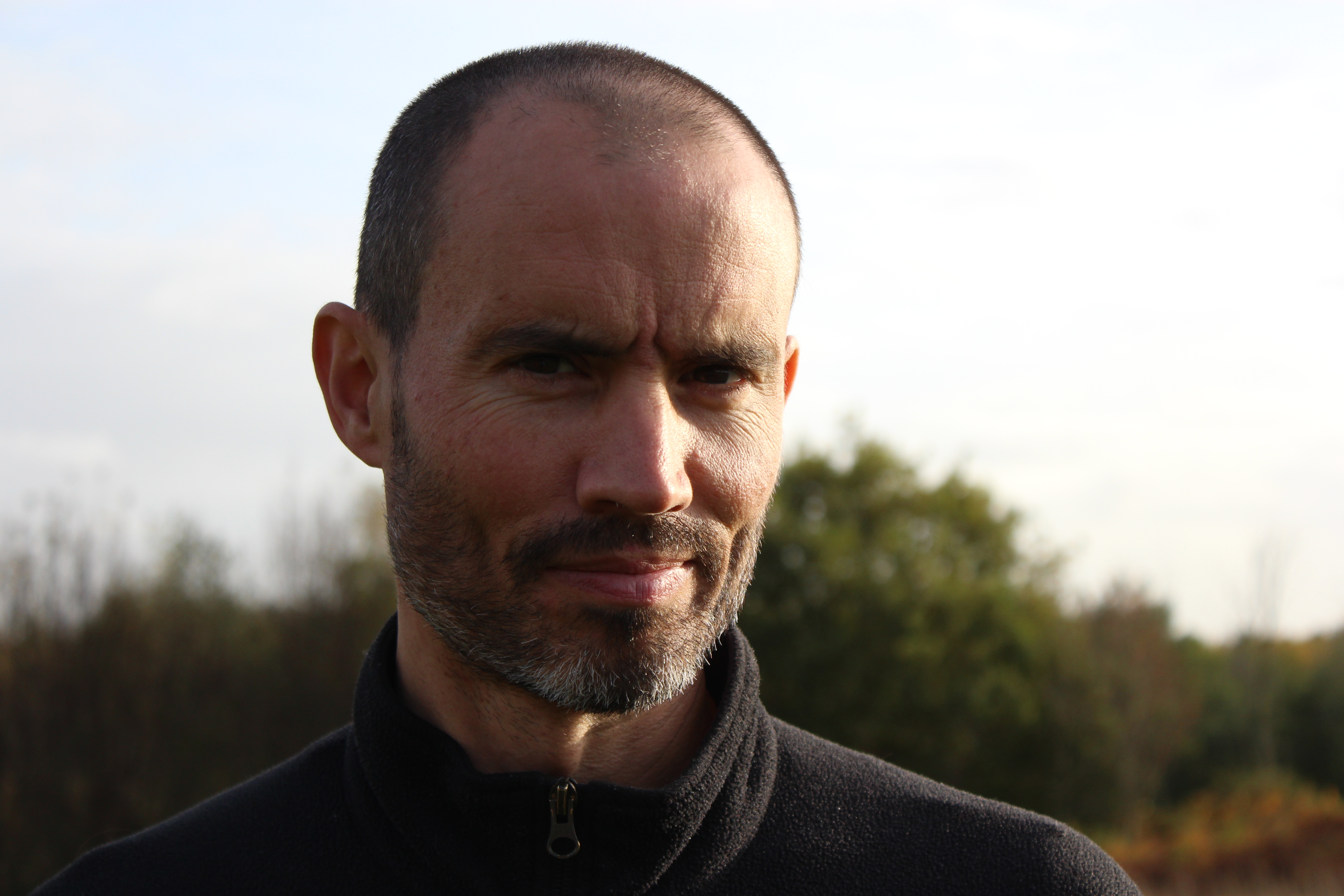
- Cotter in May 2020
- Born: Andrew Douglas Millar Cotter; 20 July 1973 (age 52); Troon, Ayrshire, Scotland
- Education: University of Glasgow
- Occupation: Sports commentator
- Employer(s): BBC Sport, Sky Sports, BT Sport
- Website: www.andrewcotter.co.uk

Andrew Douglas Millar Cotter (born 20 July 1973) is a Scottish sports broadcaster working primarily for the BBC, covering mainly golf and rugby union, but also tennis, athletics and the Boat Race.

== Early life ==
Cotter is from Troon in Ayrshire and has a degree in French and Philosophy from the University of Glasgow. He played golf for Scottish Schools and Scottish Universities.

== Career ==
=== Radio ===
Cotter started his broadcasting career at Scot FM, a commercial radio station based in Edinburgh, in 1997. In 2000 he moved to London to work at both BBC Radio 5 Live and Sky News. It was at BBC Radio that he began his commentary career, in both rugby and golf covering The Six Nations and Rugby World Cup as well as the Masters Tournament, The Open Championship, the U.S. Open, the PGA Championship and the Ryder Cup. At the same time he was presenting sports bulletins across BBC Radio.

=== Television ===
Cotter's work in television began in 2001, presenting sports bulletins on BBC News 24. In 2003 he began commentating on golf for BBC Television, covering the Masters Tournament and The Open Championship, as well as other events on the European Tour. That year he also began commentating on rugby union for BBC Sport, primarily covering the Six Nations Championship.

In 2008, he began commentating on tennis and is a regular voice for the Wimbledon Championships on the BBC, whose commentating is also used for the tournament’s English language coverage on Eurosport.

Since 2013, Cotter has been part of BBC Sport's commentary team for athletics, working on several European Athletics and World Athletics Championships, as well as the Olympic Games. He has attended four Olympics, initially as a multi-sport commentator, but since 2016 as part of the athletics team and also as commentator on the opening and closing ceremonies.

Cotter took over as lead commentator on the Boat Race, when it returned to BBC from ITV in 2011.

== Personal life ==
Videos of Cotter commentating on his two Labrador dogs gained widespread public attention in 2020 during the COVID-19 pandemic.

== Publications ==
- Olive, Mabel & Me: Life and Adventures with Two Very Good Dogs. Edinburgh: Black & White, 2020. ISBN 978-1785303227
- Dog Days: A Year with Olive & Mabel. Edinburgh: Black & White, 2021. ISBN 978-1785303654
