= Today at Wimbledon =

- Also known as: Wimbledon: Match of the Day (1964–1989); Wimbledon 2day (2015)
- Genre: Sport highlights
- Presented by: Qasa Alom (2023–present)
- Theme music composer: Leslie Statham.
- Opening theme: "Light and Tuneful"(composed by Keith Mansfield)
- Ending theme: "Sporting Occasion"
- Country of origin: United Kingdom
- Original language: English

Production
- Production locations: All England Lawn Tennis and Croquet Club, London
- Running time: 60 minutes
- Production company: BBC Sport

Original release
- Network: BBC One; BBC Two
- Release: 23 June 1964 – present

Today at Wimbledon is a BBC TV show, showing highlights and discussion from the day's play at the Wimbledon Championships currently hosted by Qasa Alom. The show lasts for 60 minutes and is broadcast on BBC One at 9:00 pm.

== Origins ==
The BBC (the UK host broadcaster of the Championships) began broadcasting Wimbledon in 1937. David Coleman hosted the live coverage from 1964 to 1966 and from 1968 to 1969. Harry Carpenter hosted the live coverage in 1967 and from 1970 to 1990 (and in some years also hosted the evening highlights programme). Des Lynam fronted Wimbledon live coverage on BBC television from 1991 to 1997 and in 1999 (Steve Rider hosted the live coverage in 1998). After Wimbledon 1999, Lynam moved to ITV and was replaced from 2000 by Sue Barker who hosted Wimbledon live coverage on BBC television until 2022.

== Broadcast history ==
The evening highlights programme was initially broadcast late evening on BBC2 when the channel launched in 1964 and titled Wimbledon: Match of the Day. It moved to BBC1 in 1984, in the era when Des Lynam hosted with Gerald Williams as a studio guest. It was renamed Today at Wimbledon in 1990 (The breakfast repeat is known as Yesterday at Wimbledon) and moved back to BBC2 in 1997 when it was allotted a fixed start time of 9.30 pm before moving again to an 8:30 pm slot in 2005 and the following year to an even earlier start time of 8.00 pm to allow BBC2 to schedule non-sports output from 9 pm. As a result, if significant matches last beyond that time the programme was usually cut short, and occasionally, especially in the second week of the tournament, was not shown at all, to allow the live tennis coverage to continue to be shown.

Until 2023, it was presented either from the BBC's dedicated studio in the Wimbledon media centre, or from the landscaped garden on the building's roof, adjacent to court 18. From 2023, the show's format was revamped and is now entirely pre-recorded earlier in the day, allowing for the programme to be aired each night during the championships; any nights in which live tennis continues beyond 9:00pm results in the programme being uploaded onto BBC iPlayer instead of being shown on BBC Two.

The theme music is from "Sporting Occasion" by Leslie Statham.

== Hosts ==
Presenter	Seasons
Jack Kramer	1964–1970
Harry Carpenter	1971–1978
David Vine	1979–1982
Des Lynam	1983–1989
Harry Carpenter	1990–1993
Sue Barker	1994–1999
John Inverdale	2000–2014
Clare Balding	2015–2022
Qasa Alom	2023–present

== Wimbledon 2day ==
In 2015, the programme was rebranded Wimbledon 2day (a pun on the channel's name). Clare Balding became the new presenter after long-time host John Inverdale left to join the BBC's Wimbledon commentary team. The opening week was presented from The Gatsby Club – a temporary hospitality venue outside the grounds – with stand-up presentation, handheld cameras, various social media features and a small live audience. The changes prompted many complaints, in particular the reduction in highlights. The BBC tweaked the format in the second week, Balding hosting a more traditional show, without an audience, from the upper floor of Centre Court with views across the grounds.

For 2016, the show returned to the Today at Wimbledon name and format.
