= Bud Collins =

US journalist and sportscaster (1929–2016)

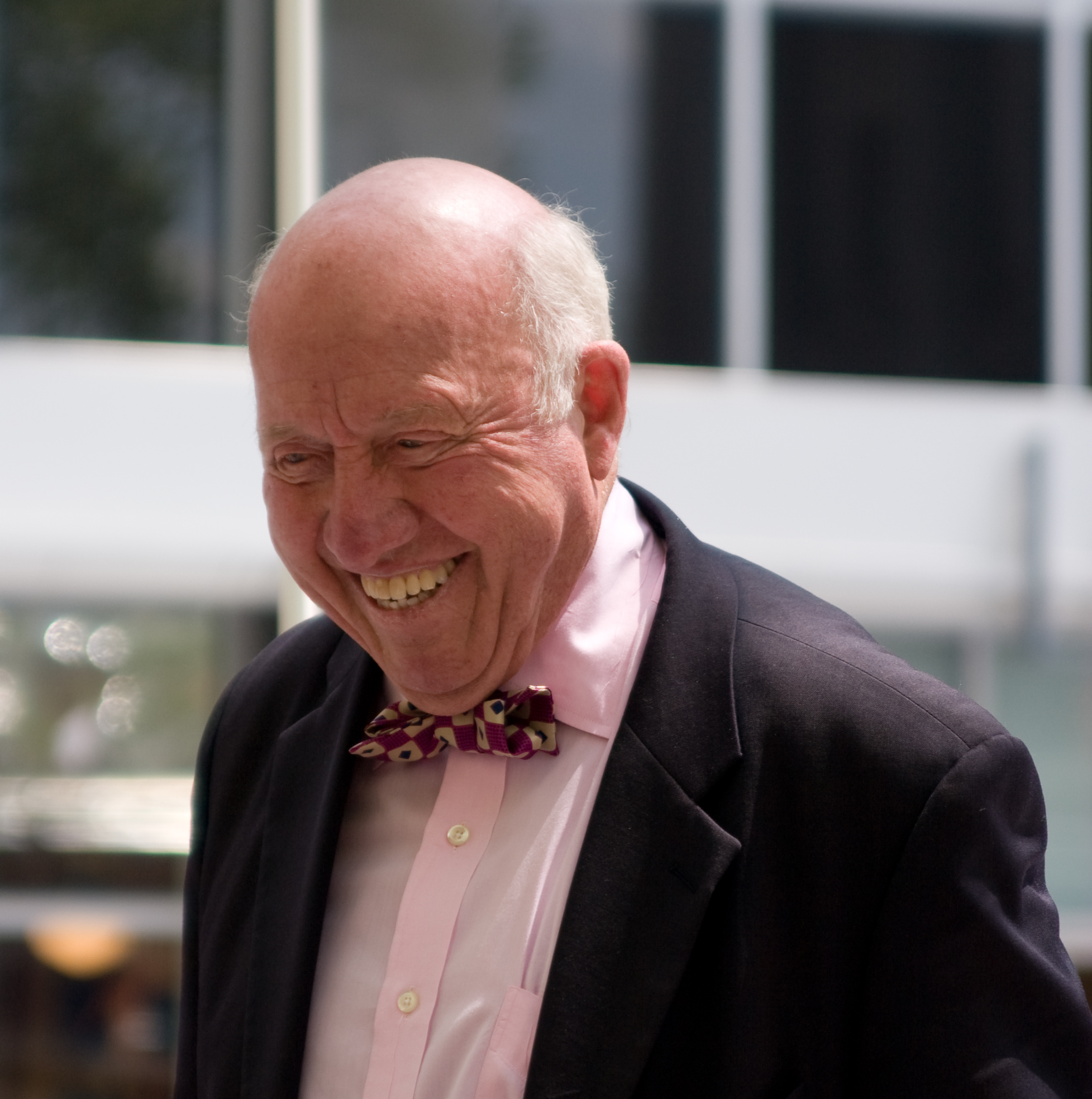
- Collins in May 2008
- Born: Arthur Worth Collins Jr. June 17, 1929; Lima, Ohio, U.S.
- Died: March 4, 2016 (aged 86); Brookline, Massachusetts, U.S.
- Occupation(s): Sports columnist TV commentator

Arthur Worth "Bud" Collins Jr. (June 17, 1929 – March 4, 2016) was an American journalist and television sportscaster, best known for his tennis commentary. Collins was married to photographer Anita Ruthling Klaussen.

== Education ==
Collins was born on June 17, 1929, in Lima, Ohio, and was raised in the Cleveland suburb of Berea, Ohio, where he graduated from Berea High School in 1947. Collins graduated from Baldwin-Wallace College, where he was a member of the Alpha Tau Omega fraternity. After his U.S. Army service, Collins attended graduate school at Boston University. He drove the 700 miles from Lima to Boston with "The mission: convince Boston University to let him study journalism. The promise: if accepted, he would be an excellent student." However, Collins did not graduate from the College of Communications until 2009.

From 1959 to 1963, Collins served as tennis coach at Brandeis University, where one of his players was future political activist Abbie Hoffman. Collins said about Hoffman: "We didn't like each other, but he was a good competitor. He also had a better car than I did." At the time of Collins' death in 2016, the 1959 team was the only undefeated tennis team in Brandeis history.

== Career as a journalist ==
Collins began writing for the Boston Herald as a sportswriter while a student at Boston University. In 1963, he moved to The Boston Globe and began providing tennis commentary for Boston's Public Broadcasting Service outlet WGBH. From 1968 to 1972, he worked for CBS Sports during its coverage of the US Open tournament, moving to NBC Sports in 1972 in time for its Wimbledon coverage. He also teamed with Donald Dell to call tennis matches for PBS television from 1974 to 1977.

Collins covered numerous sports, athletes and teams for The Boston Globe, including the Boston Red Sox during their "Impossible Dream" 1967 season.

During Collins' years with The Boston Globe, he was a general and political columnist and also wrote for the paper's travel section. In 1967, he became a candidate for the office of mayor of Boston.

During the 2007 Wimbledon tournament, Collins announced that NBC had declined to renew his contract after 35 years with the network. He said that he did not plan to retire and would continue to cover tennis for The Boston Globe. Fellow Boston Globe sportswriter Bob Ryan ridiculed NBC's decision on ESPN's The Sports Reporters. Ryan said that the 78-year-old Collins "still has his fastball" and praised the Boston Globe for retaining Collins.

Collins was hired by ESPN on August 7, 2007. He teamed with former NBC partner Dick Enberg on the network's Wimbledon, US Open, French Open and Australian Open coverage. He also covered the US Open for XM Satellite Radio.

In 1999, Collins received the Red Smith Award, the nation's most prestigious sportswriting honor, awarded by Associated Press Sports Editors.

Collins was inducted in the National Sportscasters and Sportswriters Association Hall of Fame in 2002.

Collins is credited with popularizing the term 'Bagel', referring to a set in tennis that ends with a score of 6–0, after it was coined by Harold Solomon.

== Playing career ==
Although Collins described himself as a "hacker," he was an accomplished tennis player. He won the U.S. indoor mixed-doubles championship (with Janet Hopps) in 1961, and was a finalist in the French senior doubles (with Jack Crawford) in 1975.

== Other activities ==
Collins authored several books, including The Education of a Tennis Player (with Rod Laver, 1971), Evonne! On the Move (with Evonne Goolagong Cawley, 1974) and a memoir, My Life With the Pros (1989). He also produced several tennis encyclopedias, including The Modern Encyclopedia of Tennis, the Bud Collins Tennis Encyclopedia and Total Tennis.

In 1992, Collins hosted the 116th annual Westminster Kennel Club Dog Show on the USA Network.

In 1994, Collins was elected to the International Tennis Hall of Fame.

Collins' trademark unusual bowties and pants were custom-made from unique fabrics that he collected during his travels. According to Collins' website, all of his pants were fashioned by tailor Charlie Davidson at the Andover Shop in Cambridge, Massachusetts. In 2006, he made a cameo appearance as himself in the episode "Spellingg Bee" for the television show Psych.

His papers and manuscripts are housed currently at the Howard Gotlieb Archival Research Center at Boston University. In September 2015, in recognition of his years of service to tennis, the media center at the US Open Tennis Center was named the Bud Collins Media Center.

== Death ==
Collins died on March 4, 2016, at age 86 in his home in Brookline, Massachusetts.

On the news of his death, fellow journalists praised Collins. Boston Globe columnist Dan Shaughnessy wrote: "If you ever met Bud, you know he was brilliant, clever, generous, funny, knowledgeable, and irreverent. If you never met Bud...I am so sorry. You missed out." USA Today columnist Christine Brennan, who had covered numerous tennis events with Collins, said: "He loved events, he loved people, he just loved everything. There wasn't a better journalist, there wasn't a nicer guy, and there wasn't a better friend than Bud Collins."

Many in the tennis world spoke of Collins' impact on the game. John McEnroe said: "He was certainly a character, and in a sport like ours, it's pretty evident that we need more of those these days. He was someone who loved tennis, lived and breathed it, and we don't have enough of those people, either." Billie Jean King remarked: "Few people have had the historical significance, the lasting impact, and the unqualified love for tennis as Bud Collins. He was an outstanding journalist, an entertaining broadcaster, and as our historian he never let us forget or take for granted the rich history of our sport."

== Bibliography ==
- Laver, Rod; Bud Collins (1971). The Education of a Tennis Player. Simon & Schuster. ISBN 0-671-20902-7.
- Collins, Bud; Rod Laver (1973). Rod Laver's Tennis Digest. Follett. ISBN 0-695-80387-5.
- Goolagong, Evonne; Bud Collins (1975). Evonne! On the Move. Dutton. ISBN 0-525-10115-2.
- Collins, Bud; Zander Hollander (1980). Bud Collins' Modern Encyclopedia of Tennis. Doubleday. ISBN 0-385-13093-7.
- Collins, Bud (1989). My Life with the Pros. E.P. Dutton. ISBN 0-525-24659-2.
- Collins, Bud; Zander Hollander (1994). Bud Collins' Modern Encyclopedia of Tennis. Gale Research. ISBN 0-8103-8988-6.
- Collins, Bud; Zander Hollander (1997). Bud Collins' Tennis Encyclopedia (3rd ed.). Visible Ink Press. ISBN 1-57859-000-0.
- Collins, Bud; Zander Hollander (1998). Bud Collins' Tennis Encyclopedia. Gale. ISBN 1-57859-086-8.
- Collins, Bud (2003). Total Tennis: The Ultimate Tennis Encyclopedia. Sports Media Pub. ISBN 0-9731443-4-3.
- Collins, Bud (2008). History of Tennis: An Authoritative Encyclopaedia and Record Book. New Chapter Press. ISBN 978-0942257700.
- Collins, Bud (2010). The Bud Collins History of Tennis (2nd ed.). Detroit: Visible Ink Press. ISBN 978-0942257700.
- Collins, Bud (2016). The Bud Collins History of Tennis (3rd ed.). New York: New Chapter Press. ISBN 978-1-937559-38-0.
