= Tennis on ESPN =

Television series

- Created by: ESPN
- Country of origin: United States
- No. of episodes: N/A

Production
- Running time: 120 minutes+

Original release
- Network: ESPN; ESPN2; ESPN3; ESPN on ABC; ESPN+
- Release: 1979 – present

The sport of tennis has been televised by the properties of ESPN since 1979 and for ABC since 2006.

Current tournaments and competitions covered by ESPN include Australian Open, the Wimbledon Championships and the US Open. After hosting many non-Grand Slam events throughout the years, ESPN has greatly pared back its non-Grand Slam coverage.

== Tournaments ==
=== Current ===
- Australian Open (1984–present)
- The Championships, Wimbledon (2012–present, full coverage, 2003–2011, partial coverage)
- US Open (2015–present, full coverage, 2009–2014, partial coverage)

=== Former ===
- French Open (1986–1993, 2002–2015; partial coverage)
- Miami Open (1985–2007, 2011–2019)
- Canadian Open (2004–2017)
- Silicon Valley Classic (2004–2017)
- Citi Open (2004–2017)
- Winston-Salem Open (2004–2017)
- Atlanta Open (2010–2017)
- ATP Finals (2000–2019)
- Indian Wells Masters (?–2007, 2011–2021)
- U.S. Men's Clay Court Championships (2022–2024)

== Leagues ==
- World TeamTennis (2014–2021)

== ESPN Tennis announcers ==
- Malika Andrews (2026–present) (host)
- James Blake (2020–present) (analyst)
- Kris Budden (2024–present) (reporter)
- Darren Cahill (2007–present) (analyst)
- Mary Carillo (1988–1997, 2003–2010) (analyst)
- Cliff Drysdale (1979–2025) (play-by-play/analyst)
- Dick Enberg (2004–2011) (play-by-play)
- Chris Eubanks (2024–present) (analyst)
- Chris Evert (2011–present) (analyst)
- Mary Joe Fernandez (2000–present) (analyst)
- Mardy Fish (2019) (analyst)
- Chris Fowler (2003–present) (play-by-play)
- Katie George (2026–present) (host)
- Brad Gilbert (2004–2025) (analyst)
- Jason Goodall (2015–present) (play-by-play/analyst)
- Luke Jensen (1994–present) (host/analyst)
- John McEnroe (2009–present) (analyst)
- Patrick McEnroe (1995–present) (play-by-play/host/analyst)
- Chris McKendry (2016–present) (studio host/play-by-play)
- Mike Monaco (2022–present) (play-by-play)
- Sam Querrey (2025–present) (analyst)
- Tom Rinaldi (2003–2020) (reporter)
- Jeremy Schaap (2021–present) (reporter)
- Alexandra Stevenson (2019–present) (analyst)
- Rennae Stubbs (2017–present) (analyst)
- Pam Shriver (1990–2025) (play-by-play/analyst/reporter)
- CoCo Vandeweghe (2026–present) (analyst)
- Caroline Wozniacki (2020–present) (analyst)
