= Sports broadcasting contracts in the United Kingdom =

In the United Kingdom, sporting events are broadcast on several national television networks, as well as radio. Many of the sporting events are listed online or in different kind of apps. These apps are mainly designed for sport fans who want to have an easy way to find when a certain game or match is played, as well as when a race starts or which channel is broadcasting the Olympic Games etc.

Certain sporting events are protected by the Ofcom Code on Sports and Other Listed and Designated Events and must be broadcast live and free-to-air on terrestrial television in the UK.

Presently, free-to-air means a TV channel which is free and covers 98% of the population. According to Ofcom regulations, qualifying free-to-air channels are BBC One, BBC Two, ITV, Channel 4 and Channel 5.

== Association football/soccer ==
=== Television ===
Broadcasting contracts for football (Television)
Event	Broadcaster	Broadcast details
FIFA World Cup Finals	BBC/ITV	All matches live on BBC & ITV with final live on both broadcasters until 2030
FIFA World Cup Qualifiers	ITV/S4C/BBC	All UEFA matches live: All England matches live on ITV.; All Wales matches live on S4C and BBC.; All Scotland and Northern Ireland matches live on BBC.; Other games on Amazon Prime
FIFA World Cup Qualifiers	Amazon Prime	All UEFA matches live: All England matches live on ITV.; All Wales matches live on S4C and BBC.; All Scotland and Northern Ireland matches live on BBC.; Other games on Amazon Prime
FIFA World Cup Qualifiers	FIFA+	All CAF matches live
FIFA World Cup Qualifiers	Premier Sports	Argentina, Brazil, and Ecuador home matches only.
FIFA World Cup Qualifiers	Fanatiz	All CONMEBOL matches live (exc. ARG, BRA, and ECU home matches)
FIFA World Cup Qualifiers	Youtube	All CONCACAF matches live
FIFA World Cup Qualifiers	OneFootball	All AFC matches live from third, fourth, and fifth round
FIFA Women's World Cup	BBC/ITV	All matches live on BBC & ITV with final live on both broadcasters in 2027
UEFA European Championship Finals	BBC/ITV	All matches live on BBC & ITV with final live on both broadcasters until Euro 2028
UEFA European Championship Qualifiers	ITV/S4C/BBC	UEFA Euro 2028 qualification: All England matches live on ITV; All Wales matches on S4C and BBC; All Scotland and Northern Ireland games on BBC
UEFA European Championship Qualifiers	Prime Video	UEFA Euro 2028 qualification: All England matches live on ITV; All Wales matches on S4C and BBC; All Scotland and Northern Ireland games on BBC
UEFA Nations League	ITV/S4C/BBC	Home Nations in UEFA Nations League until 2034: All England matches live on ITV including associated friendlies until 2034; All Wales matches live on S4C and BBC; All Scotland and Northern Ireland games on BBC
UEFA Women's European Championship	BBC/ITV	All matches live on BBC & ITV in 2035 with final live on both broadcasters
Africa Cup of Nations	Channel 4	All 52 matches live in 2025/26 across Channel 4, 4Seven and E4
Copa América	Premier Sports	All matches live for 2028
England men's national football team matches	ITV	All qualifiers, UEFA Nations League games and all friendlies live on ITV until 2034
England women's national football team matches	ITV	Live Nations League, all friendlies, all qualifiers until 2034
Northern Ireland national football team matches	BBC	All Qualifiers and Friendlies live until June 2034
Northern Ireland women's national football team matches	BBC Northern Ireland	All matches live until 2034 via BBC iPlayer with selected games on BBC NI Television
Scotland national football team matches	BBC	All Nations League, Qualifiers, and Friendlies live until June 2034
Scotland women's national team matches	BBC	All Friendly and Nations League matches
Wales national football team matches	BBC/S4C	All matches live on S4C until 2034 (All Qualifiers and Friendlies live on BBC until June 2034)
Wales women's national football team matches	BBC Wales	Live until 2031
FIFA Club World Cup	Channel 5	23 of 63 matches (including all English representative teams matches) live in 2025
FIFA Club World Cup	DAZN	All 63 matches live in 2025
FIFA Intercontinental Cup	FIFA+	All five matches live
FIFA Champions Cup	FIFA+	Live for both first and second round matches only in 2026
FIFA Champions Cup	Sky Sports	Final four matches live in 2026
UEFA Champions League	Prime Video / TNT Sports / Paramount / BBC	17 Champions League matches live on Amazon Prime on Tuesday nights until 2030-31. 186 matches live on TNT Sports until 2026-27, moved to Paramount+ from 2027-28 until 2030-31. Highlights on BBC Sport.
UEFA Europa League	TNT Sports	until end of 2026/27 Season
UEFA Europa League	Sky Sports	Live from 2027/28 until 2030/31
UEFA Conference League	TNT Sports	until end of 2026/27 Season
UEFA Conference League	Sky Sports	Live from 2027/28 until 2030/31
UEFA Super Cup	Paramount+	Live from 2027/28 until 2030/31
UEFA Women's Champions League	BBC	7 live matches per season until 2030
UEFA Women's Champions League	Disney+	Live until 2030
UEFA Youth League	TNT Sports	All matches live until 2026-27
AFC Champions Leagues	YouTube	All ACL Elite, Two, and Women's matches live
CAF Champions League	Channel 4	Both finals only live in 2025-26
CONMEBOL Libertadores	BBC	Final only, live
CONMEBOL Libertadores	Amazon Prime	Last five matches (four semi finals and a final) live in 2025
CONMEBOL Libertadores	Canal GOAT	Live in 2026
CONMEBOL Sudamericana	Amazon Prime	Last five matches (four semi finals and a final) live in 2025
CONMEBOL Sudamericana	Canal GOAT	Live in 2026
CONMEBOL Recopa	Canal GOAT	Both matches live in 2026
OFC Champions League	FIFA+	Safe Brodcasting
(England) Premier League	Sky Sports	Minimum of 215 matches live from 2025/26 until 2029: Package B: Total matches = 50 (32 matches at Saturday 17:30; approx. 6-10 rescheduled matches but not at Sunday 14:00; all 10 matches as part of 3rd midweek round); Package C: Total matches = 62-70 (32 matches at Sunday 14:00; 30-38 rescheduled matches at Sunday 14:00); Package D: Total matches = 44 (32 matches at Sunday 16:30; up to 2 matches at match week 37; all 10 matches on final match week); Package E: Total matches = 58 (32 matches at Monday/Friday 19:30-20:00; all 20 matches as part of 1st and 2nd midweek rounds; 6 additional matches)
(England) Premier League	TNT Sports	52 matches live until 2029: Package A: Total matches = 52 (32 matches at Saturday 12:30; all 20 matches as part of 4th and 5th midweek rounds)
(England) Premier League	BBC	Highlights until 2029
(England) English Football League	Sky Sports	2024/25 to 2028/29: 328 Championship matches, 248 League One matches, 248 League Two matches and all 15 Play-off matches live via Sky Sports or Sky Sports +
(England) English Football League	ITV	10 live matches (increased from 5 in 2024-25) from 2025-26 to 2026–27 seasons, as well as highlights
(England) EFL Cup	Sky Sports	2024-29: All 93 matches live on Sky Sports and Sky Sports +
(England) EFL Cup	ITV	10 live matches including Final, as well as highlights, until 2026/27.
(England) National League	DAZN	Live until 2031 including end of season play-offs
(England) Women's Super League	Sky Sports	Live until 2030
(England) Women's Super League	BBC	21 live matches until 2030
(England) Women's Super League	YouTube	Selected matches live
(England) Women's Super League 2	YouTube	All matches live
(England) FA Cup	BBC	14 live matches per season including final from 2025 to 2029.
(England) FA Cup	S4C	Selected live matches involving Welsh clubs
(England) FA Cup	TNT	At least 40 matches per season including final from 2025 to 2029
(England) Women's FA Cup	Channel 4	Six live matches including final from 2025 to 2028
(England) Women's FA Cup	TNT	19 live matches from 2025 to 2028
(England) WSL Players Cup	BBC	Three matches (both semi finals and a final) live in 2025–26
(England) WSL Players Cup	Sky Sports	Last seven matches (four quarter finals, both semi finals, and a final) live in 2025–26
(England) FA Community Shield (men's)	TNT	Live on TNT Sports until 2028
(England) FA Community Shield (men's)	BBC	Highlights only until 2028
(England) FA Women's Community Shield	BBC	Hilights until 2028
(England) EFL Trophy	Sky Sports	All matches live until 2034
(England) EFL Trophy	ITV	Highlights or live of final until 2031
(England) FA Trophy and FA Vase	TNT	Final live
(England) FA Youth Cup	TNT	Final only live
(England) FA Youth Cup	BBC	Final only live
(England) FA Youth Cup	Youtube	Quarter finals and semi finals only live
(Northern Ireland) NIFL Premiership	BBC	8 live matches on BBC Two Northern Ireland and 30 live matches on BBC iPlayer until 2025/2026 season plus highlights of all matches
(Northern Ireland) NIFL Premiership	Sky Sports	Four live matches per season until 2024/25
(Northern Ireland) Irish Cup	BBC	Final live on BBC Northern Ireland and 1 live match from each round on BBC Sport NI website and BBC iPlayer until 2025/2026.
Northern Ireland Football League Cup	Sky Sports	Final live
Northern Ireland Football League Cup	BBC	Highlights on BBC NI
(Northern Ireland) NIFL Women's Premiership	DAZN	Five matches per-week live until 2027
(Northern Ireland) NIFL Women's Premiership League Cup	DAZN	Live until 2027
(Northern Ireland) IFA Women's Challenge Cup	BBC	Final live on BBC Sport Northern Ireland website
(Scotland) Scottish Professional Football League	Sky Sports	60 live matches per season until 2028–29
(Scotland) Scottish Professional Football League	BBC	Highlights of Scottish Premiership matches on BBC One Scotland and BBC Scotland; 30 live SPFL Championship matches on BBC Scotland; Live Scottish League One and SPFL Challenge Cup matches on BBC ALBA until 2028–29; weekly highlights from Championship, League One and League Two on BBC Sport website
(Scotland) Scottish Professional Football League	Premier Sports	22 live matches per season from 25/26 (20 games for 24/25) (SPFL agree expanded Premier Sports deal)
(Scotland) Scottish Cup	BBC	8 live matches from Round 1 including final until 2029 plus highlights
(Scotland) Scottish Cup	Premier Sports	10 live matches from Round 4 including final until 2029 plus highlights
(Scotland) Scottish League Cup	Premier Sports	Live matches, with an additional 25 matches available via streaming, until 2030–31 (Premier Sports Cup Extension)
(Scotland) Scottish Challenge Cup	Premier Sports	Four matches live, with option for more (Premier Sports Cup Extension)
(Scotland) Scottish Challenge Cup	BBC	Four matches live (one quarter-final, both semis, and the Final on BBC Alba.
(Scotland) Scottish Junior Cup	BBC	Final live
(Scotland) Scottish Women's Premier League	BBC	At least five SWPL/League Cup matches live per season until 2028/29
(Scotland) Women's Scottish Cup	BBC	On BBC Alba and Final match
(Scotland) Scottish Women's Premier League Cup	Sky Sports	All Games on Sky Sports
(Republic of Ireland) League of Ireland	LOITV	Premier Division all games
(Republic of Ireland) League of Ireland First Division	LOITV	All Games
(Republic of Ireland) FAI Cup	LOITV	All Rounds live
(Republic of Ireland) President of Ireland's Cup	LOITV	Highlights of the Game and LIVE
(Republic of Ireland) League of Ireland Women's Premier Division	LOITV	All matches on live
(Republic of Ireland) FAI Women's Cup	LOITV	All Games
(Wales) Cymru Premier	S4C	One weekly live match plus highlights on Sgorio
(Wales) Cymru North	S4C	One game on Monday to Friday all matches
(Wales) Cymru South	S4C	Saturday and Sunday all games
(Wales) Welsh Cup	S4C	One live game from round three onwards plus highlights
(Wales) Welsh League Cup	S4C	Final live plus highlights of the aemi-finals
(Spain) La Liga	Premier Sports	340 games per season until 2027-28
(Spain) La Liga	Disney+	One game each Saturday evening until 2027-28
(Spain) Segunda División	Premier Sports	340 games per season until 2026-27
(Spain) Segunda División	Disney+	One game each Saturday evening until 2027-28
(Spain) Copa del Rey	Premier Sports	Two or three matches per round until 2027–28
(Spain) Copa del Rey	ITV	Remaining four matches (starting from a quarter final, both of four semi finals, and a final) live in 2025–26
(Spain) Supercopa de España	TNT Sports	All three matches (both semi finals and a final) live until 2027–28
(Spain) Liga F	DAZN	Live
(Spain) Copa de la Reina	DAZN	Final live
(Spain) Supercopa de España Femenina	DAZN	All matches
(France) Ligue 1	Ligue1+	Live until 2028–29
(France) Ligue 1	ITV	Highlights on ITV4 for 2024-25 and 2025–26 season
(France) Ligue 1	Ligue 1 Pass	From 2024-25 to 2028-29
Coupe de France	DAZN	Live until 2025–26
(France) Trophée des Champions	Ligue1+	From 2024 to 2028
(France) Première Ligue	DAZN	Live
Coupe de France Féminine	DAZN	Final live
(France) Trophée des Championnes	DAZN	Live from 2023 to 2027
(Germany) Bundesliga	BBC	One game per round on Friday at 19:30 Live from 2025 to 2026 on BBC iPlayer and BBC Sport Website
(Germany) Bundesliga	Sky Sports	One game per round on Saturday at 17:30 Live from 2025 to 2026 and one game from mid-week rounds at 19:30
(Germany) Bundesliga	Amazon Prime	All Sunday and mid-week games on a Pay-per-View basis
(Germany) Bundesliga	Youtube	Selected matches live on both Vardy Party and That's Football channels respectively
(Germany) 2. Bundesliga	Youtube	All matches live
(Germany) DFL Supercup	Amazon Prime	Live from 2026 on a Pay-per-view basis.
(Germany) DFB-Pokal	Premier Sports	One match per round live until 2029-30.
(Germany) Frauen-Bundesliga	DAZN	Live
(Germany) DFB-Pokal Frauen	DAZN	Live
(Germany) DFB-Supercup Frauen	DAZN	Live
(Italy) Serie A	TNT	Two Live games per round until 2026–27
(Italy) Serie A	DAZN	All games live until 2026–27
(Italy) Serie A	BBC	Selected matches live until 2026-27
(Italy) Serie BKT	DCTV	DCTV Games's of Serie B From (2025-26 to 2034-35)
(Italy) Coppa Italia	Premier Sports	Live until 2026–27
(Italy) Supercoppa Italiana	Premier Sports	Live until 2026–27
(Italy) Serie A Women	DAZN	Live
(Italy) Coppa Italia Women	DAZN	Live
(Italy) Supercoppa Women	DAZN	Live
(Netherlands) Eredivisie	Premier Sports	Two matches per round live from 25/26 season
(Netherlands) Eredivisie	Triller TV	Four matches per round live until 2029-30
(Austria) Bundesliga	OneFootball	All matches live
(Argentina) Argentine Primera División	Premier Sports	At least two games per round from round 22 of 2025 Season
(Brazil) Campeonato Brasileiro Série A	Premier Sports	At least two matches (exc. Flamengo home matches) from round 20 of 2025 Season
(Brazil) Campeonato Brasileiro Série A	Flamengo TV	19 Flamengo home matches only
(Brazil) Copa do Brasil	Premier Sports	Six matches (four semi finals and both finals) live in 2025. With selected games from round one from 2026 onwards.
(United States) (Canada) Major League Soccer	Apple TV	All matches live until 2029
(United States) National Women's Soccer League	TNT Sports	All games live
(Australia) A-Leagues	TNT	All men's and women's matches live
(Japan) J. League	YouTube	Two or four J1 matches per-week, including 13 league cup prime stage matches, and a super cup match.
(South Korea) K League	K League TV	All K1 and K2 matches live
(Saudi Arabia) Saudi Pro League	Recast	Three matches per-week live until 2026–27
(Saudi Arabia) Saudi King's Cup	Recast	Live until 2026–27
(Saudi Arabia) Saudi Super Cup	Recast	All three (both semi finals and a final) matches live in 2026–27

=== Radio ===
==== BBC Radio 5 Live / Talksport ====
Premier League: Live commentaries until 2029
Package	Time	Broadcaster	
1	15:00 Saturday	Pick 1	BBC Radio 5 Live and BBC World Service (Sportsworld)
1	15:00 Saturday	Pick 2	BBC Radio 5 Sports Extra
2	12:30 Saturday	Talksport	
3	17:30 Saturday	BBC Radio 5 Live	
4	14:00 Sunday	BBC Radio 5 Live and BBC Radio 5 Sports Extra	
5	16:30 Sunday	BBC Radio 5 Live and BBC World Service (Sportsworld)	
6	20:00 Friday	Talksport	
6	20:00 Monday	Talksport	

- All matches from two midweek match rounds live on BBC Radio 5 Live / BBC Radio 5 Sports Extra and BBC Sport website and app.
- All Live commentaries on all rearranged midweek matches on Talksport.
- All Boxing Day matches and one further midweek match round live via Talksport.
- Live commentary of all England international matches.
- Live commentary on selected Scotland, Wales and Northern Ireland international matches
- Live commentary on selected UEFA Champions League and the UEFA Europa League matches, involving British clubs
- Live commentary on WSL [talkSPORT hold exclusive radio rights until 2028.]{16 WSL matches live each season.}
- Live commentary on Women's FA Cup matches
- Live commentary on all FIFA World Cup Finals matches until 2026
- Live commentary on all UEFA European Championship Finals matches until 2028
- Live commentary on FA Cup and EFL Cup matches and FA Community Shield
- Live commentary of up to 150 live EFL Championship matches on Talksport / Talksport 2
- Live commentary of up to 15 live EFL League One / Two matches on Talksport / Talksport 2
- Live commentary of all EFL play-off matches on Talksport / Talksport 2
- Live commentary of up to 10 live EFL Trophy matches including final on Talksport / Talksport 2
- Live EFL reports and goal flashes on BBC Radio 5 Live
- Live commentary on selected SPFL matches including all Old Firm derbies on BBC Radio 5 Live

=== BBC World Service ===
- Over 50 live Premier League commentaries per season via BBC Radio 5 Live
- 11 live FA Cup matches via BBC Radio 5 Live including Final
- Live commentary of EFL Cup Final via BBC Radio 5 Live

=== BBC Radio Scotland ===
- Commentary on Scottish Premiership matches with split coverage on MW/DAB and FM frequencies
- Commentary on Scottish Cup and Scottish League Cup matches
- Commentary on Scotland international matches

=== BBC Radio Wales ===
- Live commentary on all Cardiff City matches on 103.9 FM / DAB
- Live commentary on all Swansea City matches on 93.9 FM / DAB
- Live commentary on all Newport County matches on 95.9 FM / DAB
- Live commentary on all Wrexham matches on 95.4/91.1 FM / DAB
- Commentary on Wales international matches until 2026

=== BBC Radio Ulster ===
- Reports and commentary on Irish League football with some split coverage on BBC Radio Foyle Digital
- Commentary on Northern Ireland international matches

=== BBC Radio Foyle ===
- Commentary on Derry City matches in the League of Ireland

=== BBC Local Radio ===
- Local Premier League, EFL and FA Cup commentaries via BBC Local Radio with some split frequency coverage

=== Clyde 1 ===
- Preview, half-time and full-time reports from Scottish Premiership matches during weekend Superscoreboard programming

=== Independent Radio News (for UK commercial radio network) ===
- Reports and goalflashes from every Premier League match including live updates in networked IRN hourly news bulletins
- Reports and goalflashes from selected FA Cup matches including semi-finals and final
- Reports and goalflashes from EFL Cup Final and Championship play-off final
- Reports and goalflashes from England home matches

=== Manx Radio ===
Commentary of all Isle of Man FC home matches on Manx Radio 1386 AM

== Rugby league ==
=== Television ===
Broadcasting contracts for rugby league (television)
Event	Broadcaster	Broadcast Details
Super League	Sky Sports	All Super League matches live on Sky Sports and Sky Sports + until 2026
Super League	BBC	10 live matches per season on BBC TWO until 2026, including two play off matches. 5 matches live on BBC iPlayer. Highlights of Grand Final.
RFL Championship	TBC	
Challenge Cup	BBC	One live match from rounds one to four on BBC Sport website; two fifth round matches, three sixth round matches, four quarter-finals, two semi-finals and the final live on BBC TV in 2025
Challenge Cup	Premier Sports	One fifth round match, one sixth round match and two quarter-finals live until 2022/2023
World Club Challenge	BBC	Live until 2026
Rugby League World Cup	Premier Sports	All matches live in 2026
Women's Rugby League World Cup	Premier Sports	All matches live in 2026
National Rugby League	Sky Sports	Live
Rugby League State of Origin	Sky Sports	Live

20 live streamed matches from Challenge Cup, League 1, Women's Super League and Wheelchair Rugby League via The Sportsman

Ashes Series All matches live on BBC in 2025

=== Radio ===
- BBC Radio 5 Sport Extra

Live Super League and Challenge Cup matches with reports on BBC Radio 5 Live; Super League Grand Final on 5 Live
Live State of Origin via ABC Radio on BBC Radio 5 Sports Extra

- BBC Local Radio

Commentaries on Super League, Championship and Challenge Cup matches

- Talksport 2

Commentaries on approx 80 Super League matches live per season with Grand Final on Talksport

- Independent Radio News (for UK commercial radio network)

Reports from Super League Grand Final and Challenge Cup Final

== Rugby union ==
=== Television ===
Broadcasting contracts for rugby union (Television)
Event	Broadcaster	Broadcast details
Rugby World Cup	ITV	All 48 matches live
World Rugby Junior Championship	Premier Sports	All matches live from 2026
Women's Rugby World Cup	BBC	All matches live in 2025
Six Nations Championship	BBC	Five of 15 matches involving Scotland and Wales (inc. a match between Scotland vs Wales) live until 2029
Six Nations Championship	Premier Sports	Five of 15 matches involving Scotland and Wales (inc. a match between Scotland vs Wales) live until 2029
Six Nations Championship	ITV	Ten of 15 matches (including all five England matches) live until 2029
Six Nations Championship	S4C	Wales matches only live
Nations Championship	ITV	All Matches in 2026 and 2028 exclusively live on ITV1 and ITV4
Women's Six Nations Championship	BBC / S4C	All matches live until 2029 with matches across BBC Two, BBC Wales, S4C, BBC Scotland, BBC Northern Ireland and BBC iPlayer
Six Nations Under 20s Championship	BBC / S4C	All matches until 2029 on BBC iPlayer with selected matches on BBC Red Button and S4C
WXV	BBC	Live
British and Irish Lions	Sky Sports	Live
The Rugby Championship	Sky Sports	Live until 2025
England Autumn Internationals	TNT Sports	Live until 2025
England women's national rugby union team internationals	BBC	Live
Scotland Autumn Internationals	TNT Sports	Live until 2025
Scotland women's national rugby union team	TNT Sports	Live until 2025
Wales national rugby union team	TNT Sports	Live until 2025
Wales national rugby union team	S4C	Live until 2025
Wales national women's rugby union team	S4C	Until 2025
(Republic of Ireland) Ireland national rugby union team Autumn internationals	TNT Sports	Live until 2025
(Republic of Ireland) Ireland women's national rugby union team	TNT Sports	Live until 2025
France national rugby union team Autumn Internationals	TNT Sports	Live until 2025
France national women's rugby union team	TNT Sports	Live until 2024
Italy national rugby union team Autumn Internationals	TNT Sports	Live until 2025
Italy women's national rugby union team	TNT Sports	until 2025
New Zealand national rugby union home Internationals	Sky Sports	Live until 2025
Australia national rugby union home Internationals	Sky Sports	Live until 2025
South Africa national rugby union home Internationals	Sky Sports	Live until 2025
Argentina national rugby union home Internationals	Sky Sports	Live until 2025
Japan national rugby union team	Sky Sports	Live until 2025
(Europe) European Professional Club Rugby	Premier Sports	63 European Rugby Champions Cup and 17 European Rugby Challenge Cup matches live until 2026–27
(Europe) European Professional Club Rugby	S4C	One live match per round
(Italy) (Republic of Ireland) (South Africa) (Scotland) (Wales) United Rugby Championship	Premier Sports	All 151 matches live until 2028-29
(Italy) (Republic of Ireland) (South Africa) (Scotland) (Wales) United Rugby Championship	S4C	Twenty live game per season (involving Welsh Clubs for 25/26 and 26/27 seasons).
(England) Premiership Rugby	TNT Sports	3 to 4 live games per round on linear TV, with remaining round game(s) available via TNT (Red Button) and HBO Max, until 2030–31
(England) Premiership Rugby	ITV	Seven co-exclusive games, live per season including the final, as well a highlights until 2025–26.
(England) Premiership Rugby Cup	TNT Sports	Selected matches live each season until 2030-31
(England) Premiership Women's Rugby	TNT Sports	One live match each week plus semi-finals and the final
(Wales) Super Rygbi Cymru	S4C	Weekly Thursday night matches live via S4C Clic, YouTube and Facebook; Weekly highlights on S4C
(France) Top 14	Premier Sports	Live until 2031
(Australia) (Fiji) (New Zealand) Super Rugby	Sky Sports	Live until 2025
(South Africa) Currie Cup	Sky Sports	Live until 2025
(New Zealand) National Provincial Championship	Sky Sports	Live until 2025
Japan Rugby League One	Premier Sports	Live until 2031
(United States) Major League Rugby	Premier Sports	Live until 2031
(Germany) Rugby Bundesliga	Premier Sports	Live

=== Radio ===
BBC Radio 5 Live and BBC Radio 5 Live Sports Extra

- Live commentary of Six Nations Championship matches until 2029
- Live commentary on Premiership Rugby
- Live commentary on European Rugby Champions Cup
- Live commentary of 2023 Rugby World Cup
- Live commentary of all home nations autumn internationals in 2024 and 2025

Talksport and Talksport 2

- Commentary on all Autumn International Series matches until 2024
- Live commentary on Premiership Rugby
- Reports from Six Nations Championship matches
- Live commentary of British & Irish Lions 2025 Tour

BBC Radio Wales and BBC Radio Cymru

- All Wales Six Nations matches live; Autumn internationals live on BBC Radio Cymru

BBC Radio Ulster

- Live commentary on all Ulster European Rugby Champions Cup matches and selected Ulster URC matches
- Commentary on all Ireland Six Nations matches
- Commentary on Ireland Autumn International matches

BBC Radio Scotland

- Commentary on all Scotland Six Nations matches

Independent Radio News (for UK commercial radio network)

- Reports from Six Nations Championship matches

== Cricket ==
=== Television ===
Broadcasting contracts for cricket (television)
Event	Broadcaster	Broadcast details
England men's cricket team (Home Tests)	Sky Sports	All matches live until 2028
England men's cricket team (Home Tests)	BBC	Daily highlights until 2028
England men's cricket team (Home ODIs and T20Is)	Sky Sports	All matches live until 2028
England women's cricket team	Sky Sports	All matches live until 2028
England women's cricket team	BBC	Highlights of ODI and International T20 matches 2 male t20 and 2 female t20 matches are live on channel 5 until 2028
(Republic of Ireland) One-day International and International Twenty20 Cricket in Ireland	YouTube	Home ODI's and T20I's live on Cricket Ireland YouTube channel
(Australia) (India) (Pakistan) (South Africa) (Cricket West Indies) Overseas International cricket	Sky Sports	Live coverage of Tests, ODIs and T20Is, from South Africa and Pakistan until 2024
(Australia) (India) (Pakistan) (South Africa) (Cricket West Indies) Overseas International cricket	TNT Sports	Live coverage of Tests, ODIs and T20Is, from Australia, West Indies (until 2026) and India (until 2028)
ICC Cricket World Cup	Sky Sports	Live until 2031
ICC Cricket World Cup	Channel 5	Highlights and final live in 2023
ICC Women's World Cup	Sky Sports	Live until 2029
ICC Men's T20 World Cup	Sky Sports	Live until 2030
ICC Women's T20 World Cup	Sky Sports	Live until 2030
ICC Under-19 World Cup	Sky Sports	Live until 2030
Asia Cup	TNT Sports	Live in 2023
County Championship	Sky Sports	Selected matches live until 2024
T20 Blast	Sky Sports	Live until 2024
One-Day Cup	Sky Sports	Final live until 2024
The Hundred	Sky Sports	Live coverage of all 34 men's games and 34 women's games on Sky Sports The Hundred, with selected games on Sky Sports Mix and all women's games on Sky Sports Cricket YouTube
The Hundred	BBC	10 men's and 8 women's games live
Indian Premier League	Sky Sports	All 74 matches live on Sky Sports until 2027
Women's Premier League (IND)	Sky Sports	Live until 2027
Big Bash League (AUS)	Sky Sports	Live in 2024
Women's Big Bash League (AUS)	Sky Sports	Live in 2023
Super Smash (NZL)	TNT Sports	Live in 2022
Women's Super Smash (NZL)	TNT Sports	Live in 2022
Caribbean Premier League	TNT Sports	Live
Pakistan Super League	Sky Sports	Live until 2024
SA20 (RSA)	Sky Sports	Live
Bangladesh Premier League	Premier Sports	Live
Major League Cricket	TNT Sports	Live

==== In-play video highlights clips of ICC events on BBC Sport and Sky Sports websites ====
- In-play video highlights clips of England international and The Hundred matches on BBC Sport website
- Clips also available for free on Sky Sports and England and Wales Cricket Board websites
- Live free streaming coverage of selected County matches via county cricket club websites and YouTube channels

=== Radio ===
BBC Radio 5 Live and BBC Radio 5 Sports Extra:

- Live Test Match Special commentary on all England home Test, ODI & T20 matches until 2028
- Live commentary on all The Hundred matches on BBC Radio 5 Live, Radio 5 Sports Extra and BBC Sport website until 2028
- Live commentary on ICC Cricket World Cup, ICC Champions Trophy & ICC World Twenty20 matches until 2027
- Sports Extra commentary on Cricket Australia international matches via ABC Radio Grandstand, plus selected Big Bash League and Women's Big Bash League matches
- Sports Extra commentary on Indian Premier League matches in 2023
- Live commentary on selected England away series (Test, ODI & T20)

BBC Local Radio (including BBC Radio Wales):

- Commentary on all First Class county, List A and T20 Blast matches on BBC Sport website until 2024
- Selected matches on BBC Radio 5 Sports Extra

Talksport

- Live reports from England home international cricket matches

Talksport 2

- Live commentary on England Test, ODI and T20 tours in India, New Zealand, Sri Lanka and West Indies

== Tennis ==
=== Television ===
Event	Broadcaster	Broadcast details
Wimbledon	BBC	Live on BBC Sport until 2033
Wimbledon	TNT Sports	Daily highlights and men's singles and women's singles finals live
US Open	Sky Sports	Live until 2027
French Open	TNT Sports	Live until 2026
Australian Open	TNT Sports	Live on TNT Sports until 2031
ATP Finals	Sky Sports	All matches live until 2028
ATP World Tour Series	Sky Sports	All Masters 1000s, all ATP 500s and 13 ATP 250s until 2028
WTA Tour	Sky Sports	Live coverage of 51 tournaments per year until 2028
Queen's Club Championships	BBC	Live until 2027
Eastbourne International	BBC	Live until 2027
Nottingham Open	BBC	Live until 2027
Birmingham Classic	BBC	Live in 2024
Davis Cup	BBC	Live in 2023
Laver Cup	TNT Sports	Live until 2030

=== Radio ===
- BBC Radio 5 Live and Radio 5 Sports Extra:
  Commentary on all four Grand Slam tournaments plus selected other tournaments including the BNP Paribas Open at Indian Wells and the Queens Club Championships
- BBC World Service: Commentary on Wimbledon men's and women's singles finals
- Talksport: Live reports from Wimbledon
- Independent Radio News (for UK commercial radio network): Hourly reports from Wimbledon including live updates in networked IRN hourly news bulletins
- LBC News: Twice-hourly live reports from Wimbledon

== Golf ==
Broadcasting contracts for golf (television)
Event	Broadcaster	Broadcast details
Majors
The Open Championship	Sky Sports	Live until 2028
The Open Championship	BBC	Daily highlights until 2027
The Masters	Sky Sports	Live in 2026, "multi-year" deal signed in 2025
US Open	Sky Sports	Live in 2024
US PGA Championship	Sky Sports	Live coverage until 2026
PGA Tour
US PGA Tour events	Sky Sports	32 live PGA Tour events including FedEx Cup play-offs and Presidents Cup until 2024
European Tour events	Sky Sports	32 live events until 2024
LPGA Tour	Sky Sports	Live via Sky Sports Golf YouTube channel
British Women's Open	Sky Sports / BBC	Live on Sky Sports / Daily highlights on BBC
Other events
Ryder Cup	Sky Sports	Live until 2029
Ryder Cup	BBC	Highlights until 2029
World Golf Championships events	Sky Sports	Live until 2029
BMW PGA Championship	Sky Sports	Live until at least 2029
BMW PGA Championship	BBC	Highlights until 2029

Live featured groups coverage of all British DP Tour events via YouTube
Live coverage of LIV Golf events via YouTube

=== Radio ===
- BBC Radio 5 Live / Radio 5 Sports Extra:

Live commentary on the US Open, US Masters and US PGA Championships on Sports Extra with final round on 5 Live
Live commentary of The Open Championship and Ryder Cup on 5 Live
Live commentary of Women's British Open on Sports Extra

- Talksport 2:

Live commentary on The Open Championship via Open Golf Radio and Ryder Cup via Ryder Cup Radio
Live commentary on US PGA Tour events from PGA Tour Radio

== Motorsport ==
=== Television ===
Broadcasting contracts for motorsport (television)
Event	Broadcaster	Broadcast details
Motor racing
FIA Formula One World Championship	Sky Sports	All races live on Sky Sports F1 until 2034 with British Grand Prix, selected other races live on Sky Showcase; highlights of all qualifying and races on Sky One
FIA Formula One World Championship	Channel 4	Live coverage of the British Grand Prix with highlights of all F1 races and qualifying sessions until 2026 Live coverage of the British Grand Prix with highlights of all F1 races and qualifying sessions until 2034 - broadcaster TBC
FIA Formula One World Championship	Formula1.com, YouTube & F1TV	highlights of all F1 races, qualifying and practice sessions on F1, Sky Sports & Channel 4's YouTube channel
FIA Formula E World Championship	Disney+	Live coverage for all races from 2026/27 onwards
FIA Formula E World Championship	ITV	Live coverage of nine ePrixs including Monaco and London, highlights of all other races on ITV4; all races live on ITVX races
World Endurance Championship	TNT Sports	Live; overnight Le Mans coverage on QUEST
FIA Formula 2 Championship / FIA Formula 3 Championship	Sky Sports	Live practice, qualifying and races
FIA Formula 2 Championship / FIA Formula 3 Championship	YouTube & F1TV	highlights of all races, qualifying and practice sessions on F1, F2 & Sky Sports YouTube channel
(United States) (Canada) IndyCar Series	Sky Sports	Live qualifying and races
(United Kingdom) British Touring Car Championship	ITV	Live on ITV4; Highlights on ITV until 2026; Qualifying live on ITV website
(Australia) (New Zealand) Supercars Championship	TNT Sports	Live Races only
(United States) NASCAR	Premier Sports	Live
Goodwood Festival of Speed	ITV	Live on ITV in 2023
Motorcycle racing
MotoGP	TNT Sports	All races and qualifying live
MotoGP	ITV	Live coverage of British Grand Prix and two other races in 2024; Highlights of all other races until 2024 on ITV4
Superbike World Championship	TNT Sports	Live
Superbike World Championship	ITV	Highlights
(United Kingdom) British Superbike Championship	TNT Sports	Live qualifying and races until 2028
(United Kingdom) British Superbike Championship	Quest	Highlights until 2028 with five live races per season.
Isle of Man TT	TTplus and ITV4	Live stream and daily highlights respectively
(Northern Ireland) North West 200	BBC	Live on BBC Northern Ireland website with three television highlights shows until 2026
(Northern Ireland) Ulster Grand Prix	BBC	Highlights
(United Kingdom) SGB Premiership	TNT Sports	Live until 2024; highlights on QUEST
Speedway Grand Prix	TNT Sports	Live in 2023; British Grand Prix live on S4C
Rallying and rallycross
World Rally Championship	TNT Sports	Live
World Rally Championship	ITV	Highlights
Extreme E	ITV	Live until 2023

Broadcasting contracts for motorsport (radio)
Event	Broadcaster	Broadcast details
Motor racing
Formula One	BBC Radio 5 Live	Races live on BBC Radio 5 Live or Radio 5 Sports Extra; Qualifying and practice on Radio 5 Sports Extra or BBC Sport website British Grand Prix race commentary via BBC 5 Live Formula 1 DAB
Formula1.com & F1TV	BBC Radio 5 Live commentary of races, Qualifying and practice	
Formula1.com & F1TV	Motorcycle racing	
Isle of Man TT; Manx Grand Prix	Manx Radio	Commentary on all races from Manx Radio on 1386 AM and DAB in Douglas, Onchan and central valley area of the island.

== Boxing ==
- Matchroom Boxing: Live on DAZN
- Golden Boy: Live on DAZN
- Queensberry Promotions: Live on DAZN
- Top Rank: Live on DAZN
- Most Valuable Promotions: Live on Sky Sports
- Boxxer: Live on BBC Sport (excluding PPV fights) and DAZN (including all PPV fights)
- Dream Boxing: Live on DAZN
- Premier Boxing Champions: Live on DAZN and Prime Video
- Zuffa Boxing: Live on Sky Sports

=== Radio ===
- BBC Radio 5 Live and Talksport

Commentary on major fights involving British boxers

== Mixed martial arts ==
- Bellator: Live on DAZN
- Ultimate Fighting Championship: Live on TNT Sports and TNT Sports Box Office
- One Championship: Sky Sports and Sky Sports Box Office
- Professional Fighters League: Channel 4
- Bushido MMA: DAZN

== Kickboxing ==
- King of Kings: DAZN: October 2022 to October 2025, all fights

== Professional Wrestling ==
=== Television ===
- World Wrestling Entertainment: Live on Netflix
- All Elite Wrestling: DAZN, Prime Video, MyAEW, and ITV

== Multi-disciplines events ==
=== Television ===
Broadcasting contracts for multi-disciplines events (television)
Event	Broadcaster	Broadcast details
Olympic Games	BBC/TNT Sports	Live until 2032
Special Olympics World Games	Discovery+	
Paralympic Games	Channel 4/TNT Sports	Live until 2026
Commonwealth Games	TNT Sports	Live in 2026
Commonwealth Games	Channel 5	Daily highlights in 2026
European Games	TNT Sports	Live
World University Games	TNT Sports	Live
Invictus Games	BBC	Live

=== Radio ===
- Olympic Games:
  - Live on BBC Radio 5 Live (until 2032)
  - Live on Talksport (in 2024)
- Paralympic Games: Live on BBC Radio 5 Live
- European Championships (multi-sport event): Live on BBC Radio 5 Live

== Athletics ==
=== Television ===
- British Athletics major events: Live on BBC until 2029
- London Marathon: Live on BBC until 2030; Live on TNT Sports
- Great North Run: Live on BBC
- Great Manchester Run: Live on BBC
- Big London Half: Live on BBC Red Button until 2026
- Vitality London 10000: Live on BBC Red Button until 2030
- Vitality Westminster Mile: Live on BBC Red Button until 2030
- World Athletics Championships: Live on BBC until 2029; live on Eurosport in 2023
- Diamond League: Live on BBC until 2030
- World Athletics Continental Tour Gold: Live on Premier Sports to 2029
- World Athletics Indoor Championships: Live on BBC until 2027
- World Athletics Cross Country Championships: Live on BBC until 2025
- World Athletics Road Running Championships: Live on BBC until 2025
- World Athletics Relays: Live on BBC until 2025
- European Athletics Championships: Live on BBC until 2026
- European Athletics Indoor Championships: Live on BBC until 2027
- European Cross Country Championships: Live on BBC until 2027
- World Under 20 Athletics Championships: Live on BBC iPlayer in 2024
- Paris Marathon: Live on TNT Sports
- Boston Marathon: Live on TNT Sports
- New York Marathon: Live on TNT Sports and BBC Red Button

World Athletics Indoor Tour Silver and Bronze meetings in Europe live via European Athletics YouTube channel
Manchester Marathon live on Manchester Marathon YouTube channel

=== Radio ===
- BBC Radio 5 Live

Commentary from World Championships, European Athletics Championships, Diamond League and UK Athletics major events

== Snooker ==
=== Television ===
Broadcasting contracts for snooker (television)
Event	Broadcaster	Broadcast detail
World Snooker Championship	BBC	Live until 2032
World Snooker Championship	TNT Sports	Live until 2031
UK Championship	BBC	Live until 2032
UK Championship	TNT Sports	Live until 2031
Masters	BBC	Live until 2032
Masters	TNT Sports	Live until 2031
British Open	Channel 5	
Players Championship	Channel 5	
Tour Championship	Channel 5	
Champion of Champions	ITV	Live until 2028
Welsh Open	BBC Wales	
Welsh Open	TNT Sports	Live on TNT Sports, afternoon sessions, semi-finals and final live on DMAX
English Open	TNT Sports	Live on TNT Sports, afternoon sessions, semi-finals and final live on DMAX
Northern Ireland Open	TNT Sports	Live on TNT Sports, afternoon sessions, semi-finals and final live on DMAX
Scottish Open	TNT Sports	Live on TNT Sports, afternoon sessions, semi-finals and final live on DMAX
World Snooker Tour	TNT Sports	18 tournaments live on TNT Sports each season until 2031 with qualifiers on HBO Max
World Seniors Championship	Channel 5	Afternoon sessions and final live on Channel 5; evening sessions live on 5ACTION in 2025

== Horse racing ==
=== Television ===
Broadcasting contracts for horse racing (television)
Event	Broadcaster	Broadcast detail
Grand National	ITV	Live until 2026
Grand National	Racing TV	Live
Epsom Derby	ITV	Live until 2026
Epsom Derby	Racing TV	Live
Cheltenham Festival	ITV	Live until 2026
Cheltenham Festival	Racing TV	Live
Royal Ascot	ITV	Live until 2026
Royal Ascot	Sky Sports Racing	Live
Glorious Goodwood	ITV	Live until 2026
Glorious Goodwood	Racing TV	Live
British Champions Day	ITV	Live until 2026
British Champions Day	Racing TV	Live
Dubai World Cup	Sky Sports Racing	Live
Dubai World Cup	Racing TV	Live

- Sky Sports Racing
  - Live coverage from 25 UK courses including Ascot, Chepstow, Chester, Doncaster and Lingfield.
  - Over 200 fixtures from France (including Prix de l'Arc de Triomphe), Hong Kong, United States (including Breeders' Cup and Triple Crown), Australia (including Melbourne Cup) and South Africa.
- Racing TV
  - Live coverage from 35 UK courses including Aintree, Cheltenham, Epsom, Goodwood, Haydock, Kempton, Newbury, Newmarket, Sandown and York.
  - Irish racing.

=== Radio ===
- BBC Radio 5 Live

Commentary on all major races with full coverage of The Cheltenham Festival, The Grand National, Royal Ascot and The Epsom Derby

- BBC World Service

BBC Radio 5 Live commentary on The Grand National

- Talksport

Commentary on all major races at The Cheltenham Festival, The Grand National, Royal Ascot and The Epsom Derby, plus daily racing commentaries on Talksport 2.

== Equestrianism ==
=== Television ===
Broadcasting contracts for equestrianism (television)
Event	Broadcaster	Broadcast detail
London International Horse Show	BBC	Live
Badminton Horse Trials	BBC	Live
Burghley Horse Trials	BBC	Live

== Darts ==
=== Television ===
Broadcasting contracts for darts (television)
Event	Broadcaster	Broadcast details
PDC World Darts Championship	Sky Sports	Live until 2030
Premier League	Sky Sports	Live until 2030
Grand Slam of Darts	Sky Sports	Live until 2030
World Matchplay	Sky Sports	Live until 2030
World Grand Prix	Sky Sports	Live until 2030
World Cup of Darts	Sky Sports	Live until 2030
UK Open	ITV4	Live until 2028
European Championship	ITV4	Live until 2028
Players Championship Finals	ITV4	Live until 2028
The Masters	ITV4	Live until 2028
World Series of Darts	ITV4	Delayed coverage of all events; Finals live
PDC European Tour	Premier Sports	13 events live until 2027
World Seniors Darts Championship	TNT Sports and BBC Red Button	Live in 2025
MODUS Super Series	Pluto TV	Live on Pluto TV FAST channel
WDF World Darts Championship	S4C	All matches live on YouTube with coverage on S4C in 2025
ADC Global Championship	Pluto TV	Live in 2025 on Pluto TV FAST channel

=== Radio ===
- World Championship: Live on talkSPORT and talkSPORT 2 reports on BBC Radio 5 Live.
- Premier League, World Matchday and other major PDC tournaments: Live on talkSPORT 2.

== Rowing ==
=== Television ===
Broadcasting contracts for rowing (television)
Event	Broadcaster	Broadcast details
World Rowing Championships	BBC and TNT Sports	Live
European Rowing Championships	BBC and TNT Sports	Live
Rowing World Cup	BBC and TNT Sports	Live
The Boat Race	Channel 4	Live until 2030

=== Radio ===
- The Boat Race live on Times Radio until 2028.

== Cycling ==
=== Television ===
Broadcasting contracts for cycling (television)
Event	Broadcaster	Broadcast details
Road
Tour de France	TNT Sports	Live until 2030
Tour de France	Channel 5	Daily highlights until 2028
Giro d'Italia	TNT Sports	Live until 2025
Giro d'Italia	Channel 5	Highlights 2027-2029
Giro d'Italia	Channel 5	Highlights
Vuelta a España	TNT Sports	Live until 2025
Vuelta a España	Channel 5	Highlights until 2028
UCI World Championships	TNT Sports	Live
UCI World Championships	BBC	Live
UCI World Tour	TNT Sports	Live coverage of 30 races
Tour de France Femmes	TNT Sports	Live
Paris-Nice	TNT Sports	Live
Critérium du Dauphiné	TNT Sports	Live until 2030
Tour of Britain	ITV	Live
Women's Tour of Britain	ITV	Highlights
Women's Tour of Britain	TNT Sports	Highlights

== Swimming ==
=== Television ===
Broadcasting contracts for swimming (television)
Event	Broadcaster	Broadcast detail
World Championships	BBC	Live
World Championships	TNT Sports	Live
European Championships	BBC	Live
European Championships	Eurosport	Live
European Short Course Swimming Championships	TNT Sports	Live

=== Radio ===
- World Championships: Live commentary on BBC Radio 5 Sports Extra

== Triathlon ==
=== Television ===
- ITU World Series: Live on BBC
- Super League Triathlon: Live on BBC and Eurosport

== Gymnastics ==
=== Television ===
- European Gymnastics Championship: Live on BBC and Eurosport
- World Gymnastics Championship: Live on BBC
- Gymnastics World Cup (UK): Live on BBC

== Gridiron Football (American Football) ==
=== Television ===
National Football League
Sky Sports: live until 2028

Channel 5: Two games/week - the Sunday 6pm and 9.15pm games - during the regular season until 2028. Channel 5 will also show the London and Dublin matches, three play-off games and the Super Bowl.

NCAA College Football
DAZN: Up to 25 games a week plus College GameDay live and on demand

Sky Sports: Notre Dame home games live on Sky Sports NFL

=== Radio ===
- Live commentary from over 90 matches per season and Super Bowl on talkSPORT and talkSPORT2, with exclusive Sunday Night Football, every European international game, selected playoff matches and Super Bowl, totalling over 30 live games each season until 2028.

== Ice hockey ==
=== Television ===
- National Hockey League: Live on [[]], Premier Sports
- IIHF World Championships: Live on Premier Sports
- Kontinental Hockey League: Live on Premier Sports

== Field hockey ==
=== Television ===
- Men's and Women's Pro Leagues: Live on TNT Sports
- Men's and Women's EuroHockey Championships: Live on BBC and EuroHockey TV
- Euro Hockey League: Live on TNT Sports and EuroHockey TV
- Men's England Hockey League: Semi-finals and finals live on YouTube.
- Women's England Hockey League: Semi-finals and finals live on YouTube.

== Basketball ==
=== Television ===
- FIBA World Cup: Live on DAZN
- FIBA Women's World Cup: Live on DAZN
- FIBA Eurobasket: Live on DAZN
- FIBA Eurobasket for Women: Live on YouTube (qualifiers) and DAZN (finals)
- Super League Basketball: Live on BBC Sport (final only) and DAZN
- National Basketball Association: Live on Sky Sports and Prime Video And also NBA League Pass
- Women's National Basketball Association: Live on Sky Sports (with at least 16 regular season games and select games from the WNBA Playoffs and WNBA Finals) and Prime Video.
- College Basketball: Up to 20 games a week plus March Madness live on DAZN
- EuroLeague: Euroleague TV
- EuroCup Basketball: Euroleague TV
- National Basketball League (Australia): Euroleague TV
- Chinese Basketball Association: Euroleague TV
- Greek Basket League: Euroleague TV
- Serie A: Euroleague TV
- Liga ACB: DAZN

== Baseball ==
=== Television ===
- Major League Baseball: Live on TNT Sports; MLB London Series live on BBC until 2026

== Winter sports ==
=== Television ===
- Winter Olympics: Live on TNT Sports and BBC until 2030
- Winter Paralympics: Live on TNT Sports and Channel 4 until 2026
- Alpine Skiing World Cup: Live on TNT Sports until 2025–26; highlights on Premier Sports and highlights of selected European races on BBC Sport
- Cross-Country Skiing World Cup: Live on TNT Sports until 2025–26
- Freestyle Skiing World Cup: Live on TNT Sports until 2025–26
- Nordic Combined World Cup: Live on TNT Sports until 2025–26
- Ski Jumping World Cup: Live on TNT Sports until 2025–26
- Snowboard World Cup: Live on TNT Sports until 2025–26
- Alpine Skiing World Championships: Live on BBC Red Button; Live on TNT Sports until 2025
- Nordic Skiing World Championships: Live on TNT Sports until 2025
- World Figure Skating Championships: Live on BBC Sport until 2024; live on Premier Sports from 2024 to 2028
- European Figure Skating Championships: Live on TNT Sports

== Sailing ==
=== Television ===
- America's Cup: Live on TNT Sports

== Gaelic games ==
=== Television ===
- GAA: All Ireland football and hurling semi-finals and final live on BBC Northern Ireland, with one All-Ireland Final live on BBC TWO network television until 2027
- Ulster Senior Football Championship: Eight live games on BBC Northern Ireland including Ulster Football Final until 2027
- Allianz National Football League: 10 live games via BBC iPlayer until 2027

=== Radio ===
- BBC Radio Ulster

Live coverage of all games in the Ulster Senior Football Championships

== Shinty ==
=== Television ===
- Live coverage of Premier Division matches plus Camanachd Cup Final, Macaulay Cup Final and Scotland v Ireland shinty–hurling international on BBC

== Netball ==
=== Television ===
- Netball Superleague: Live on Sky Sports
- ANZ Premiership: Live on Sky Sports
- Netball World Cup: Live on Sky Sports and BBC

== Badminton ==
=== Television ===
- BWF World Tour: Live on TNT Sports
- BWF World Championships: Live on TNT Sports
- All England Badminton Championships: Live on BBC Red Button and TNT Sports in 2023

== Squash ==
=== Television ===
- World Squash Championships: Live on TNT Sports
- PSA World Series: Live on TNT Sports

== Bowls ==
=== Television ===
- World Indoor Bowls Championships: Live on BBC Sport
- Scottish International Open Bowls: Live on BBC iPlayer

== Table tennis ==
=== Television ===
- World Table Tennis Championships: Live on BBC Sport in 2026
- Table Tennis World Cup: Live on Eurosport until 2020
- WTT Tour (including Grand Finals): Live on YouTube
- European Table Tennis Championships: Live on Eurosport until 2020
- Europe Top 16 Cup: Live on Eurosport until 2020

== Australian rules football ==
=== Television ===
- Australian Football League: Live on TNT Sports

== Futsal ==
=== Television ===
- FA National Futsal League: Live on TNT Sports
- FIFA Futsal World Cup: FIFA+ (2024)
- FIFA Futsal Women's World Cup: FIFA+ (2025)
- UEFA Futsal Champions League: Live on YouTube (Final four only)

== Archery ==
=== Television ===
- World Archery Championships: Live on World Archery's YouTube channel
- Archery World Cup: Live on World Archery's YouTube channel

== Volleyball ==
=== Television ===
- CEV Challenge Cup: Live on EuroVolley TV
- CEV Women's Challenge Cup: Live on EuroVolley TV
