= BBC Radio 5 =

BBC Radio 5 may refer to:

- BBC Radio 5 (former), a BBC Radio network from 1990 to 1994
- BBC Radio 5 Live, a BBC Radio network since 1994
- BBC Radio 5 Sports Extra (until 2022 BBC Radio 5 Live Sports Extra), a BBC digital radio service
