= Lee James (BBC) =

British sports broadcaster

Lee James is a British sports broadcaster. He is one of the three main presenters of Sportsworld who can be heard on Saturday and Sunday on BBC World Service.

James was part of the team who won the bronze award in the best sports programme category at the 2009 Sony Radio Academy awards.
