= Rishi Persad =

UK based sports television presenter

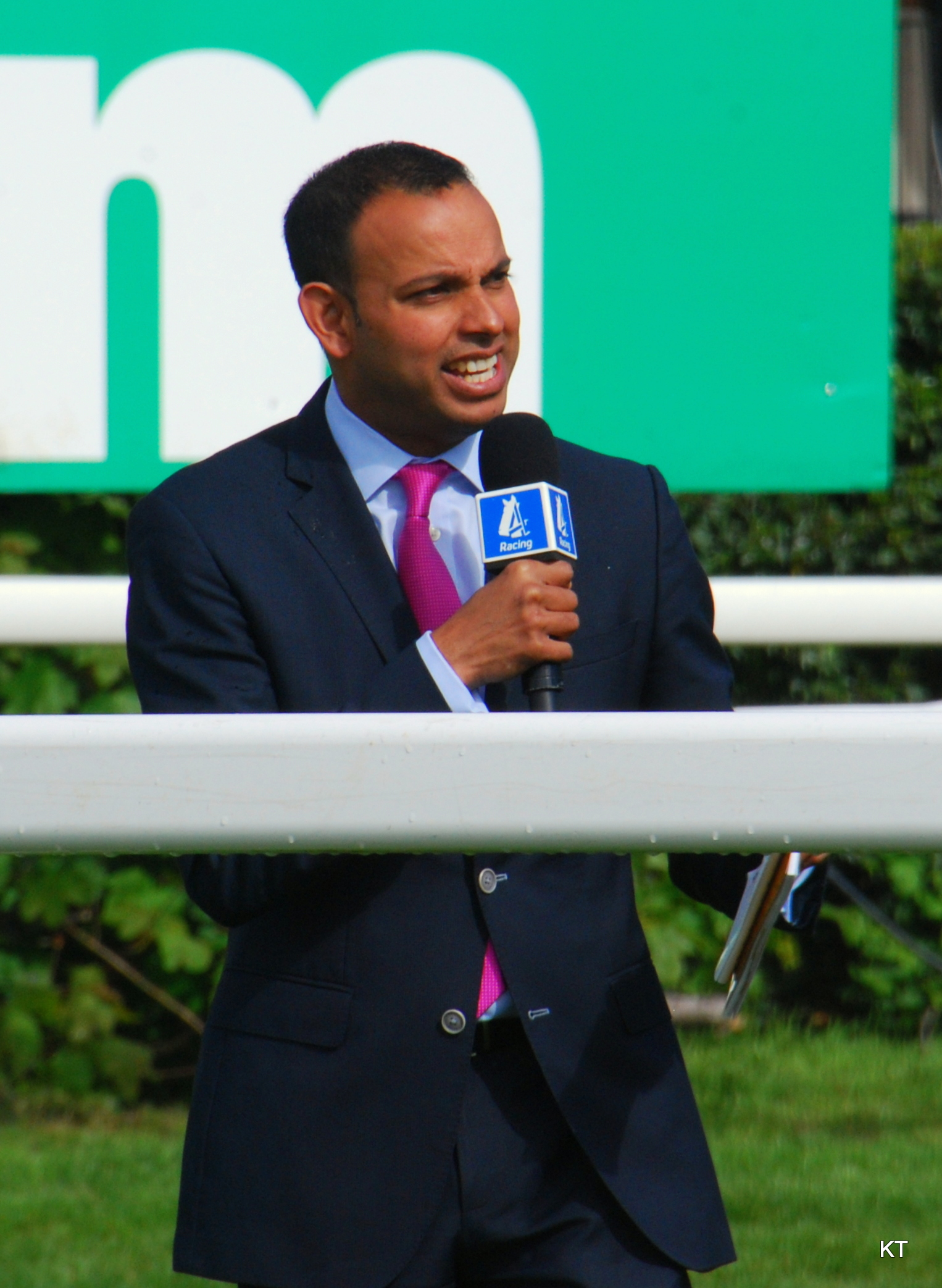
- Rishi Persad at Sandown Park in 2014, reporting for Channel 4 Racing
- Born: 25 May 1973 (age 52); Trinidad and Tobago
- Education: King's College London
- Occupations: Journalist and sports commentator
- Years active: 2002-present
- Employer(s): BBC; ITV; Channel 4 At The Races; Racing TV

Rishi Persad (born 25 May 1973) is a British sports television presenter.

== Early life ==
Persad grew up in the 1980s on the island of Trinidad in the Caribbean a keen cricket and horse racing fan. His parents were Indian, his mother worked as a bank manager and his father was a lawyer, but his father also bred and raced horses and would take Rishi on weekends to the stables and to race events. After moving to Britain aged 12 to attend boarding schools in England, Persad left university with a law degree from King's College London.

== Career ==
Persad began his career in public relations before joining At The Races in May 2002. Eight months later, he would make his terrestrial TV debut on Channel 4 Racing. Shortly after, he joined the BBC.

Persad worked for a number of channels including the likes of the BBC and ITV at The Open Championship, The Masters Tournament, Wimbledon, and the World Snooker Championship. Persad has also presented at global events such as the Olympics, The Ryder Cup and The Commonwealth Games.

For the BBC, Persad was a reporter at the Athens 2004 Olympics. He then presented at the Beijing 2008 Olympics. At the London 2012 Games, Persad presented daytime coverage of events for BBC Three. In 2016 at Rio, Persad reported for the BBC, a role he also took for the Tokyo 2020 Games and Paris 2024 Olympics.

In 2012, Persad returned to Channel 4 racing, and he was the interviewer to whom AP McCoy announced his retirement as a jockey following his tenth year of 200 winners. In 2016, it was announced ITV would be taking over coverage of terrestrial horse racing from Channel 4, and Persad was retained for the new line up.

In late 2020 in Rishi Persad: Leading The Way broadcast on Sky Sports he was interviewed by Josh Apiafi to discuss their routes into broadcasting, their experiences within the sporting media industry and how horse racing can better promote diversity within the sport.

From February 2021 Persad presented Channel 4's live test cricket coverage of the English cricket team in India in 2020–21. He presented in the television studio alongside pundits Sir Alastair Cook and Sir Andrew Strauss. Previously, Persad was a cricket presenter for the BBC at the 2011 Cricket World Cup in the Indian sub-continent.
