= Sportsworld (radio programme) =

BBC weekend sports program

- Genre: Sport
- Running time: ~180 minutes
- Country of origin: International; United Kingdom origin)
- Language: English
- Home station: BBC World Service
- Hosted by: Lee James (BBC); Delyth Lloyd
- Produced by: Joanne Smith; Ross Mitchell; Ríain McAuley
- Edited by: Matt Davies
- Recording studio: MediaCityUK, Salford
- Original release: 1959 – Present
- Audio format: Monophonic
- Opening theme: "A sky full of stars" by Coldplay (albeit with no lyrics and slightly remixed)

Sportsworld is the flagship weekend sports programme on BBC World Service radio and winner of two Sony Radio Academy Awards.

Sportsworld can be heard on BBC World Service radio, on many of the BBC's FM partner stations who simulcast the program and from August 2010 online.

Sportsworld is produced by BBC Sport for BBC World Service along with Sport Today, Sportshour, World Football and Stumped.

== History ==
The programme began as Saturday Special for one hour in the summer of 1959. Slowly its scope expanded to include the winter months to cover football. The name was changed to Sportsworld in 1979. A Sunday edition was added in 1996. The programme is now broadcast every Saturday 1400–1800 and Sunday 1600–1900 GMT. During the programme news summaries are only aired at 1430 and 1630 on Saturday, and at 1730 on Sunday. In November 2011 Sportsworld moved out of BBC Television Centre with the rest of the BBC Sport department to MediaCityUK.

== Content ==
Sportsworld brings the biggest sporting events to a global audience, using the full resources of the BBC. The programme features live commentary from the Premier League every weekend as well as the FA Cup finals during the English football season, however it is for 15:00 Saturday and 16:30 Sunday kickoffs only. Correspondents in Spain and Italy cover La Liga and Serie A. Live sport is mixed with debate, discussion and analysis of the leading sport stories of the week by the Sportsworld Panel.

The big football events on the global sporting calendar always feature such as African Cup of Nations, World Cup and European Championships, as do the multi-sport events like the Olympics, Commonwealth and Asian Games. The regular events on the annual calendar are a feature point of the year such as the Grand Slam's in Tennis, the Golfing Majors, Test cricket, Formula One, Diamond League Athletics, the NBA, the Baseball World Series and Moto GP.

A global audience of 188 million, and the reputation of the programme, ensures Sportsworld is able to secure exclusive interviews with the biggest names in world sport.

The programme often leaves its base at MediaCityUK in Salford. In 2010 Sportsworld was presented from the 2010 African Nations Cup in Angola, the Jamaican Schools Athletics Championships in Kingston, the FA Cup Final at Wembley Stadium, the 2010 World Cup in South Africa, the European Champions League final in Madrid, the 2010 World Basketball Championships in Turkey and the 2010 Commonwealth Games in Delhi.

Russell Fuller in Jamaica

== Interaction ==
Sportsworld uses texts, e-mails, blogs, Facebook and calls to interact with the audience.

== Presenters ==
Paddy Feeny presented the programme from the start in 1959 through to his retirement in 1995. Other presenters have included Mike Costello and Russell Fuller. The current presenters are Lee James for Saturday and Delyth Lloyd for Sunday.

== Special programmes ==
A three hour daily Olympic Sportsworld has been broadcast from the 2000 Olympic Games in Sydney, the 2004 Olympic Games in Athens, the 2008 Olympics in Beijing and the 2012 Olympic Games in London.

A one hour highlights programme, Sportsworld at Wimbledon, has been broadcast from the Wimbledon Championships since 1992. The Wimbledon coverage was cut as a cost-saving measure in September 2010.
