= BBC Radio 5 Sports Extra =

British digital radio station

Coordinates: 53°28′22″N 2°17′50″W

- Logo used since 2022
- Salford; United Kingdom
- Frequencies: DAB: 12B; Freeview: 706; Freesat: 706; Sky (UK only): 0127; Virgin Media: 908; Virgin Media Ireland: 928

Programming
- Language: English
- Format: Sport

Ownership
- Owner: BBC
- Sister stations: BBC Radio 5 Live

History
- First air date: 2 February 2002; 24 years ago
- Former names: BBC Radio 5 Live Sports Extra (2002–2022)

Technical information
- Licensing authority: Ofcom

Links
- Website: BBC Radio 5 Sports Extra via BBC Sounds

BBC Radio 5 Sports Extra (formerly BBC Radio 5 Live Sports Extra) is a British digital radio station owned and operated by the BBC, and specialising in extended live sports coverage. It is a sister station to BBC Radio 5 Live and shares facilities, presenters and management, and is a department of the BBC North Group division.

If a major news story breaks during the live sport broadcasts on 5 Live, the sports coverage may sometimes be redirected and continued on 5 Sports Extra, while 5 Live switches to live news.

The station is only available on digital radio, television platforms and BBC Sounds. For licensing reasons, international streaming of the station has not been available since 25 July 2016.

According to RAJAR, the station broadcasts to a weekly audience of 971,000 with a listening share of 0.2% as of March 2024.

In May 2025, two spin-off stations were added to BBC Sounds, Sports Extra 2 and Sports Extra 3, which allows multiple sporting events to be broadcast via sounds simultaneously.

== History ==
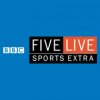
Radio Five Live Sports Extra logo (2002–07)

BBC Radio Five Live Sports Extra launched as part of the BBC's expansion into digital radio by launching several digital only stations that would complement existing coverage. At the time of launch, all radio sports coverage was included as part of BBC Radio 5 Live's mix of news and sport, the longwave frequencies of BBC Radio 4 or on individual BBC Local Radio stations. As these platforms could not accommodate any additional sports, a new service was launched: BBC Radio Five Live Sports Extra. The station began broadcasts at 2:30 pm on 2 February 2002. Juliette Ferrington introduced the first programme – commentary of the Premier League match between Manchester United and Sunderland.

Radio 5 Live Sports Extra logo (2007–2022)

In 2007, the station was rebranded in line with the rest of the network. The new BBC Radio 5 Live Sports Extra logo was turned into a circular based logo in the colour green; according to research, the green colour was chosen as people associated it with sport. In addition, a new background of blue and red diagonal lines on the same green colour was adopted for promotions for the service. Along with the rebrand, Sports Extra became more closely aligned with 5 Live. As a result, the online presence of the station was toned down with only an upcoming schedule remaining; all other details were merged into the 5 Live website or the new BBC Radio online homepage.

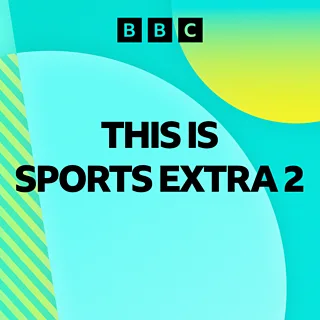
Screen shown on BBC Sounds when station is off-air and playing showreel

In 2011 the station, along with 5 Live, moved to MediaCityUK in Salford.

In 2022, the station's name was shortened to Radio 5 Sports Extra as part of a rebranding of the BBC.

In 2024, the BBC announced plans to broadcast BBC Sounds sports podcasts and sports programming from their nations and regions on the station when it is not airing live sports coverage. On 10 April 2025, Ofcom provisionally indicated that it would reject these plans, saying they "could have a significant impact on commercial sports radio, specifically the Talksport network". Similar plans to broadcast regular programming on the station were previously rejected in 2015.

On 16 May 2025, two new services, BBC Radio 5 Sports Extra 2 and BBC Radio 5 Sports Extra 3, appeared on BBC Sounds as streaming services to supplement Radio 5 Sports Extra. These spin-off streams will be used to provide additional sports coverage when BBC Radio is covering multiple sporting events at the same time.

== Broadcast ==
The remit of BBC Radio 5 Live Sports Extra is to bring a greater choice of live action to sports fans by offering a part-time extension of BBC Radio 5 live. The service should aim to provide increased value for licence fee payers from the portfolio of sports rights already owned by the BBC by offering alternative coverage to that provided on other UK-wide BBC services. All output on 5 live Sports Extra should be live sports coverage.

— BBC Trust, BBC Radio 5 Live Sports Extra Remit

BBC Radio 5 Sports Extra is broadcast only on digital platforms. It is transmitted on DAB Digital Radio and on digital television through satellite services, such as Sky and Freesat, cable operators, such as Virgin Media, DTT services via Freeview, and on IPTV. The service is also available online through the BBC website, the BBC Sounds service and the Radioplayer service part owned by the BBC. The BBC Sounds platform also re-broadcasts programmes for catch-up after original broadcast. Due to rights restrictions, some programmes are restricted to UK audiences or are not available on the BBC's online services.

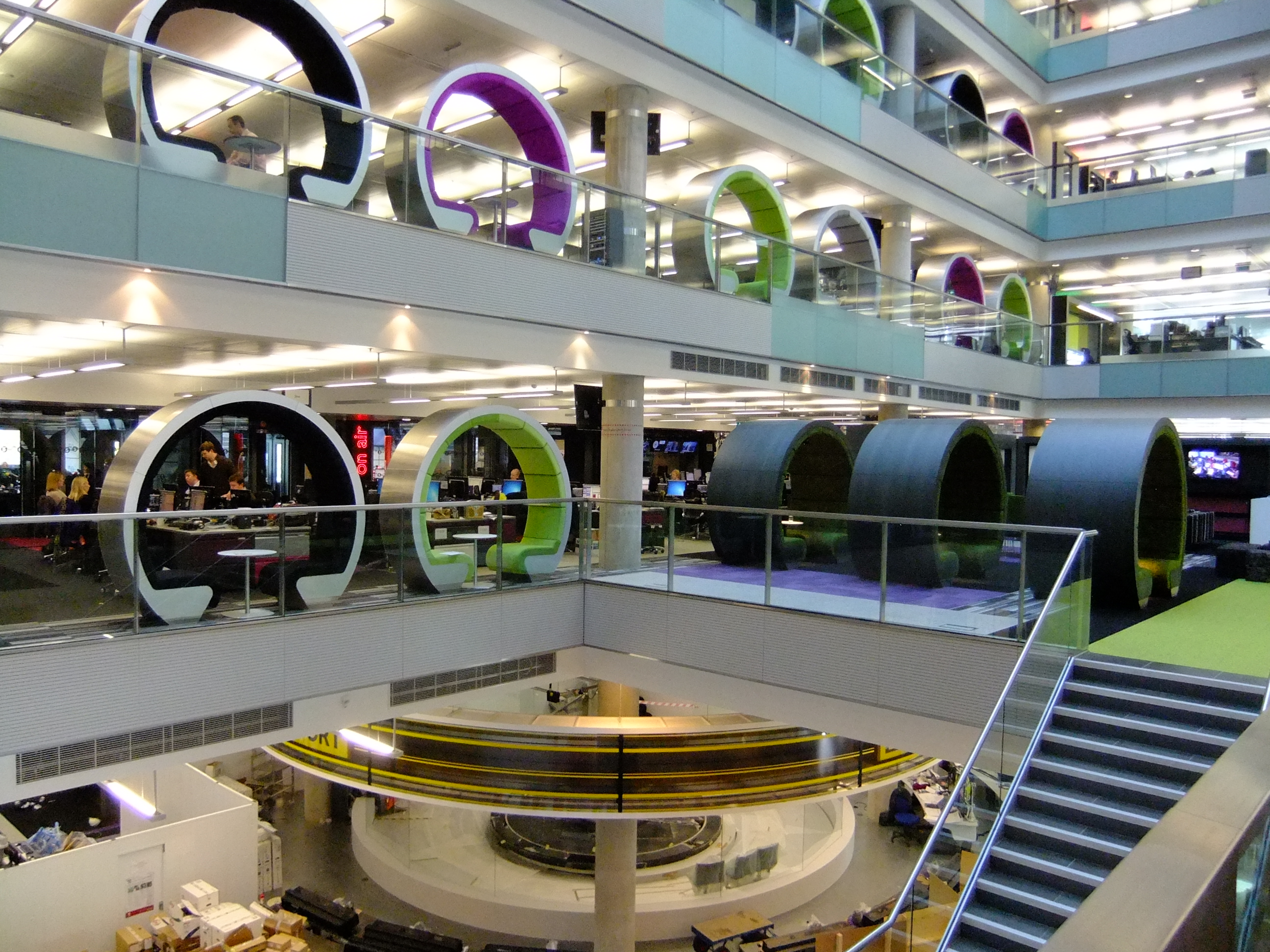
BBC Radio 5 Sports Extra's base in Quay House, MediaCityUK.

The station is a part-time service, only airing during ongoing sports broadcasts. Although it mostly broadcasts sports coverage not available on Radio 5 Live, sometimes, sections of sports coverage on Radio 5 Sports Extra will be broadcast on Radio 5 Live, such as the for final part of the Formula 1 qualifying or occasionally other major sports, such as cricket.

The broadcasts themselves are live and uninterrupted except when updates are given by commentators to listeners on Radio 5 Live, as opposed to sports coverage on Radio 5 Live which has interruptions for other sports updates and regular news bulletins. During Sports Extra's downtime, the station does not simulcast any other broadcast although a label for Sports Extra is continuously radiated on the DAB multiplex to allow those tuning their radio to store the station to their device even if it is not on air. On digital TV platforms, where Sports Extra has its own dedicated full-time stream, not sharing feed capacity with any other services, a looping promotional barker is played if no live programming is scheduled; the EPG information during this reel will often give details of the next live event to be covered by the station, should this information be available. The Sports Extra internet stream, which used to go off air when live content was not running, now also broadcasts the promo loop.

The station's controller is Jonathan Wall, who is also responsible for 5 Live and is answerable to the BBC North and BBC Audio & Music departments. The station operates from Quay House in MediaCityUK on a single floor alongside 5 Live. Although 5 Sports Extra uses no studio space, the teams required to organise the match coverage are shared with 5 Live. The move to Salford took two months, and occurred alongside 5 Live, in a bid to create a northern media hub and to outsource major production from London. Previously, 5 Sports Extra had been located alongside 5 Live in BBC Television Centre and spread over several floors.

Any live sports programmes, only broadcast on the BBC Sport website and app are not available to listen to again on BBC Sounds. Only programmes broadcast on the BBC radio stations, including BBC 5 Sports Extra, are available to listen to again. This differs from the iPlayer Red Button, which is available to watch again, even if it is not broadcast on a television channel.

== Programming ==
5 Sports Extra broadcasts a variety of sports including:

- Test Match Special (all home series involving England's men's cricket team)
- Cricket World Cup, ICC Champions Trophy, and Twenty20 World Cup
- Royal London One-Day Cup and T20 Blast
- Cricket's County Championship
- Full broadcasts of Premier League and Home Nation football if games overlap, with 5 Live carrying first-choice in these cases
- Major League Baseball's World Series, since 2004
- Wimbledon Tennis championships, with the station providing extra court commentary for the first week of the tournament
- National Hockey League's Stanley Cup Final
- Tennis Grand Slam tournament coverage of non-final rounds and some other major tennis tournaments
- FIA Formula One World Championship
- Action from any other competition broadcast on 5 Live

Test Match Special has always been seen as the flagship broadcast, and it takes priority over all other sporting coverage on the station.

Through the 2012 season, 5 Live and 5 Live Sports Extra carried NFL late games broadcast on Sunday evening, with coverage taken from Westwood One, except the NFL International Series and Super Bowl, which used BBC-produced commentaries. Absolute Radio 90s acquired the broadcast rights to the NFL beginning in 2013. BBC Radio 5 Live and 5 Live Sports Extra reacquired the rights to NFL games for the 2014–15 playoffs.

== See also ==
- BBC Radio 5 Live
- BBC Radio 4
- BBC Local Radio
- Talksport
