= Timeline of cricket on UK television =

This is a timeline of the history of cricket on television in the UK.

== 1930s to 1970s ==
- 1938
  - On 24 June, the BBC broadcasts cricket - England vs Australia at Lord’s - on television for the first time.
- 1956
  - 28 April – ITV, at that point only available in the London area and in the Midlands, shows cricket for the first time, when it broadcasts the Australian touring team's match against the Duke of Norfolk's XI at Arundel Castle.
- 1963
  - 6 June – The BBC begins broadcasting the five-match Test Series between England and West Indies.
  - 20 July – BBC Grandstand features live coverage from the first day of the 3rd women's Test between England and Australia at The Oval. This is the earliest known live television broadcast of women's Test cricket.
  - 7 September – The BBC shows live coverage of the final of the first Gillette Cup final.
- 1965
  - 2 May – Sunday Cricket is broadcast for the first time. The programme, which runs throughout the afternoon on BBC2, features full coverage of a match "played under knock-out rules".
- 1968
  - 29 and 30 July - ITV shows test cricket for the only time, and only part-networked, when the last two days of the Headingley Test against Australia coincide with the launch of Yorkshire Television. The morning session is the first thing shown on Thames Television, ahead its official opening later that day.
  - 7 September - The new ITV company London Weekend Television wins the rights to show the Gillette Cup final between Warwickshire and Sussex. This coverage is only partially networked, with other regions cutting off their coverage earlier, but coverage of the finish - shown principally in the London and Southern areas - is faded out with six minutes to go to make way for advertising and then David Frost's programme. Subsequently, there is only very occasional networked or even part-networked cricket coverage on ITV, although occasional regional coverage continues into the 1990s.
- 1969
  - 27 April – Sunday Cricket begins broadcasting a match each week from the new Sunday League.
- 1972
  - A new one-day competition, the Benson & Hedges Cup, begins and the BBC provides live coverage of a match from each round.
- 1975
  - 7–21 June – The BBC shows extensive live coverage of the first Cricket World Cup. The BBC also shows full live coverage of the 1979 and 1983 tournaments.

== 1980s ==
- 1980
  - 31 August – Sunday Cricket is broadcast for the final time, and consequently this is the last time that the featured Sunday league game is broadcast in full.
- 1981
  - 17 May – Sunday Grandstand launches. The programme includes weekly coverage of the Sunday League but coverage is now reduced as it has to share with other sporting events taking place that afternoon.
- 1982
  - No events.
- 1983
  - 6 January – The Channel 9 broadcast of the fifth cricket Test from Sydney is shown on the BBC. This is the first time cricket from abroad is shown live in England.
- 1984
  - The BBC starts showing live midweek one-day cup cricket to its conclusion. Previously live coverage had ended at around 5pm so that the BBC's teatime broadcasting of Open University matches was not displaced. Television viewers had previously been made to wait until the late-evening highlights programme to find out the result of the match.
- 1985
  - No events.
- 1986
  - November–January 1987 – The BBC shows occasional live coverage of the English cricket team in Australia in 1986–87 although the vast majority of its coverage is in highlights form. The live coverage consists of occasional sessions from the Ashes matches and of England's appearance in the final of the Benson & Hedges Challenge on 7 January 1987.
- 1987
  - 16 July – Channel 4 shows the first day-long coverage of women's cricket in the UK when England play Australia at Lord's. Coverage begins at 10.45 am and finishes at 6.30 pm, with breaks for the lunch and tea intervals. However, only the late-night highlights are shown in Wales, where S4C show Glamorgan against Pakistan instead.
  - 9 October–8 November – The BBC covers the 1987 Cricket World Cup but in a much more restricted form when compared to the previous three tournaments. The event is held in India and Pakistan, and the previous year had seen the BBC a full daytime service on BBC1, and schools programmes were on BBC2. This restricted the available television space so live coverage is restricted to the final overs of England’s matches, although England's semi-final, and the final, are both shown live, and in full.
- 1988
  - February–March – ITV shows highlights of England’s tour to New Zealand, the first coverage of the England team on ITV for two decades. Yorkshire Television and TVS initially buy the rights; coverage is also taken by the ITV companies covering London and the Channel Islands.
- 1989
  - No events.

== 1990s ==
- 1990
  - January–March – Sky shows live coverage of England's cricketing tour to the West Indies. This is the first time that live coverage of an overseas tour has been shown in the UK. The coverage is broadcast on Sky One.
- 1991
  - No events.
- 1992
  - 22 February-25 March – Sky shows its first major cricket tournament when it broadcasts exclusive live coverage of the 1992 Cricket World Cup. This is the beginning of Sky's coverage of the event which continues to this day and is therefore Sky Sports' longest-held set of rights. The event receives no terrestrial coverage apart from the final, when the BBC shows highlights due to England reaching the final.
- 1993
  - 1 August - The BBC makes a last minute decision to feature live coverage of the Women's World Cup final on Grandstand. The broadcast is watched by 2.5 million viewers.
- 1994
  - The BBC shows England's home one-day internationals live for the last time.
- 1995
  - Sky Sports take over the live rights for England's home one-day internationals, although highlights continue to be shown on the BBC.
  - 15 May – The BBC launches a monthly cricket magazine called Gower's Cricket Monthly.
  - 3 September - Cricket is shown live on a regional basis on ITV for the last time, when Yorkshire's match against the West Indies at Scarborough is shown by Yorkshire Television.
- 1996
  - 14 February-17 March – Once again, Sky Sports is the exclusive broadcaster of the Cricket World Cup with highlights shown on the BBC. The event was originally to be shown on a new cable sports channel but when the venture collapsed, Sky picked up the rights.
  - June – Sky Sports broadcasts women's cricket for the first time.
- 1996
  - No events.
- 1997
  - No events.
- 1998
  - 22 September – The final edition of cricket magazine Gower's Cricket Monthly is broadcast; a month later it is announced that the BBC has lost the right to show English cricket to Channel 4
- 1999
  - 20 June – The BBC broadcasts live cricket for the final time for more than 20 years when it shows live coverage of the 1999 Cricket World Cup Final, bringing to an end half a century of continuous cricket coverage on the BBC. The BBC had shared live coverage of the event with Sky Sports.
  - 1 July – Channel 4 starts broadcasting cricket following the channel sensationally obtaining the rights from the BBC the previous year.
  - Sky Sports broadcasts a home Test Match live for the first time as part of a joint deal with Channel 4. This arrangement continues until 2005.

== 2000s ==
- 2000 to 2004
  - No events.
- 2005
  - September – Long-form UK-based live cricket is shown for the final time on free-to-air television ahead of the full transfer of live coverage of Sky Sports. This also marks the end of Channel 4's coverage of the sport until 2019.
- 2006
  - May –
    - Sky Sports becomes the exclusive broadcaster of all live cricket matches in the UK following the ECB awarding Sky exclusive coverage of all of England's home tests, one-day internationals and Twenty20 Internationals.
    - Channel 5 becomes the new terrestrial home of highlights of England cricket's home matches.
    - The first edition of Cricket AM is broadcast on Sky Sports and Sky One. Based on its successful football-related counterpart Soccer AM, it broadcasts during the football off-season.
- 2007
  - 13 March-28 April – The BBC broadcast highlights of the 2007 ICC Cricket World Cup. This is the first time since 1999 that cricket has been shown on BBC Television. Once again, Sky Sports holds the exclusive rights to live coverage. The BBC also shows highlights of the 2011 event.
- 2008
  - 18 May – Setanta Sports shows full live coverage of the first Indian Premier League.
- 2009
  - No events.

== 2010s ==
- 2010
  - February – ITV shows live cricket throughout the UK for the first time in the modern era when it begins showing coverage of the Indian Premier League. ITV then decides to take out a four-year deal for the event. ITV further expands its coverage of cricket when it shows highlights of the 2010/11 Ashes series
  - 22–31 July – ESPN shows the inaugural Caribbean Twenty20 tournament.
- 2011
  - No events.
- 2012
  - 11–31 August – ESPN shows live coverage of the first Sri Lanka Premier League.
- 2013
  - 30 June – Sky Sports launches its first temporary channel Sky Sports Ashes to provide full coverage of the 2013 Ashes Series. Temporary channel renames of this nature is now common practice within Sky, both for sports and movies. Sky Sports Ashes subsequently returns for the 2015 Ashes series and also for the 2019 Ashes series
  - August – Cricket AM is broadcast for the final time.
- 2014
  - 1 June – ITV's live coverage of the Indian Premier League ends, having shown the event since 2010.
- 2015
  - February – Sky Sports takes over as broadcaster of cricket's Indian Premier League after five years with ITV.
  - 14 February-29 March – ITV shows highlights of the 2015 Cricket World Cup. This is the first and so far only time that ITV has covered the event. Live coverage is shown on Sky Sports, and rebrands Sky Sports 2 as Sky Sports World Cup for the duration of the tournament.
- 2016
  - July – UKTV channel Dave shows the Caribbean Premier League. It broadcasts five matches live, including the final, and shows the other games in full on a delayed basis.
  - 24 August – BT Sport takes over from Sky Sports as broadcaster of Australia's home matches for five years. This means that BT will show The Ashes series between England and Australia in 2017–18 with the deal also including the Big Bash League, the Women's Ashes and the Women's Big Bash League.
- 2017
  - 18 July – Sky Sports is revamped with the numbered channels being replaced by sports-specific channels. One of the new channels is devoted to cricket and is called Sky Sports Cricket.
  - 10 August-1 September – Sky Sports broadcasts eight matches live from the 2017 Women's Cricket Super League. This marks Sky’s first major foray into women’s cricket. Sky expands its coverage the following year, showing 12 matches from the 2018 event.
- 2018
  - March–May – BT Sport broadcasts the 2018 Indian Premier League. It is a one-off as the following year the event transfers back to Sky Sports.
  - 8 August – Sky Sports takes over from BT Sport as broadcaster of cricket's Caribbean Premier League.
- 2019
  - 31 May - 14 July – Sky Sports Cricket is rebranded as Sky Sports Cricket World Cup to show live and recorded coverage of the 2019 Cricket World Cup in England and Wales.
  - 14 July – Channel 4 shows live coverage of the 2019 Cricket World Cup Final. This is the first time since 2005 that live cricket has been shown on one of the former analogue channels. Channel 4 had the rights to show highlights of the tournament. Sky Sports had the live rights to the tournament but had agreed to make the final available on free-to-air television if England made the final.
  - 15 September – After 14 seasons, Channel 5 shows cricket highlights for the final time.

== 2020s ==
- 2020
  - July – Regular coverage of cricket returns to the BBC when it succeeds Channel 5 as the broadcaster of highlights of English cricket.
  - 20 August – The BBC shows live cricket for the first time in more than 21 years.
  - 26 September - The BBC shows live coverage of a women's international match for the first time since the 1993 World Cup final.
- 2021
  - 5 February –
    - The first live coverage of a test match on terrestrial television for more than 15 years is broadcast on Channel 4 when the channel begins showing England’s test series against India. However Channel 4's coverage does not include the one-day and T20 international matches as these are shown on Sky Sports.
    - BT Sport secures the rights to all international and domestic cricket played in the West Indies and New Zealand for the next two years. This includes England's tour to the West Indies in 2022. Sky Sports had been the previous holder of these rights.
  - 2 March – FreeSports shows test cricket for the first time when it starts showing all tests, ODIs and T20 fixtures involving Afghanistan and Zimbabwe. This builds on the channel's cricket coverage which consisted of T10 and T20 events.
  - 21 July - 23 August – The inaugural 2021 season of The Hundred takes place. Games are shown live on Sky Sports, which rebrands Sky Sports Cricket to Sky Sports The Hundred for the duration of the tournament, and on the BBC.
- 2022
  - 13 November – Channel 4 shows live coverage of the final of the 2022 ICC Men's T20 World Cup in which England plays Pakistan. The rest of the tournament had been shown by Sky Sports.
- 2023
  - 10 January – Sky Sports begins showing South Africa’s new T20 cricket league.
  - 29 March - 28 May – DAZN and Sky Sports share coverage of the 2023 Indian Premier League.
  - 1 July – For the first time since 1963, a Women's Ashes game is broadcast live on terrestrial television when BBC Two shows a T20 international match between the two countries.
  - 30 August - 16 September – TNT Sports shows the Asia Cup. This is the first time that the event has been broadcast in the UK.
  - 5 October - 19 November – Channel 5 is the highlights broadcaster of the 2023 Cricket World Cup. Sky, once again, broadcasts the live coverage of the tournament with the final also shown live on Channel 5.
- 2024
  - 25 January – TNT Sports begins showing coverage of the India national cricket team, starting with the India v England test series.

== See also ==
- Timeline of BBC Sport
- Timeline of ITV Sport
- Timeline of sport on Channel 4
- Timeline of sport on Channel 5
- Timeline of Sky Sports
- Timeline of BT Sport
- Timeline of other British sports channels
