= Timeline of rugby union on UK television =

This is a timeline of the history of rugby union on television in the UK.

== 1960s and 1970s ==
- 1966
  - 1 January – The first edition of BBC Television's Rugby Special is broadcast, showing weekly highlights of rugby union matches.
- 1967 to 1979
  - No events.

== 1980s ==
- 1980
  - 13 September – Rugby Special is moved from Sunday late afternoon to Saturday mid-evening.
- 1981
  - 20 September – Rugby Special is moved back to its former Sunday teatime slot.
- 1982
  - No events.
- 1983
  - No events.
- 1984
  - 22 September – For the second time, Rugby Special is moved from Sunday late afternoon to Saturday mid-evening.
- 1985
  - 13 October – Rugby Special returns to Sunday afternoons but is shown at the earlier time of 2pm.
- 1986
  - Autumn – The BBC launches regional versions of Rugby Special so that each nation can receive fuller coverage of games from their country.
- 1987
  - 22 May-20 June – The BBC shows mostly recorded coverage of the first Rugby World Cup. This is the only time the BBC has ever shown the competition – ITV has held the rights ever since.
- 1988
  - 2 October – Rugby Special moves back to Sunday teatimes.
- 1989
  - 23 July – The BBC broadcasts what was to be its final coverage of the British & Irish Lions when it shows live coverage of the final test match of the Lions' 1989 British Lions tour to Australia.

== 1990s ==
- 1990
  - No events.
- 1991
  - 3 October–2 November – ITV shows full live coverage of the 1991 Rugby World Cup, beginning a relationship with the tournament which continues to this day.
- 1992
  - No events.
- 1993
  - 16–18 April – Following the successful showing of the 1991 World Cup, ITV broadcasts full, live coverage of the 1993 Rugby World Cup Sevens. ITV also shows the 1997 event, but mostly on a pre-recorded basis due to time zone issues.
  - 22 May-3 July – ITV broadcasts live coverage of the 1993 British Lions tour to New Zealand.
- 1994
  - 11 May-11 June – ITV shows live coverage of the 1994 England rugby union tour of South Africa. In addition to showing the two test matches, ITV also broadcasts live coverage of all the tour matches. ITV also broadcast highlights of the other home countries' tour matches taking place in 1994. It shows all of the tour matches live. This is the only time that ITV broadcasts an English rugby tour.
  - 30 October – Sportscene Rugby Special launches on BBC Scotland's to cover Scottish rugby union with the live matches & highlights broadcasting on BBC Two Scotland on Sunday teatimes.
- 1995
  - 10 September – BBC Wales launches a new rugby union programme, Scrum V. It replaces Rugby Special Wales.
  - September – Sky Sports begins showing a weekly game from the top division of England club rugby. This is the first time that a live match from domestic rugby union had been shown in the UK.
  - 30 December and 6 January 1996 – ITV broadcasts live coverage of semi-finals and final of the inaugural Heineken Cup.
- 1996
  - November – Sky Sports begins showing live coverage of England national rugby union team's autumn internationals, replacing the BBC which held the right for many decades.
- 1997
  - April – BBC Wales loses its share of the rights to domestic Welsh club rugby, as the Welsh Rugby Union agrees a new 4-year deal with HTV Wales (who showed games previously in midweek), and S4C. The deal sees S4C show a live game every Saturday night, HTV Wales Sunday highlights on a new programme "The front Row". HTV Wales also allowed to show 4 live League matches, and 4 live cup matches (not including the cup final) live a season. The deal ends in 2001 when HTV Wales declined to tender again for the rights.
  - May–July – Sky Sports takes over as broadcaster of the British and Irish Lions when it shows full live coverage of the 1997 British Lions tour to South Africa. In addition to the test matches, Sky also broadcasts live coverage of the tour matches.
  - 31 May – Even though Channel 5 had said that it hadn't been intending to show live sport at peak time, it buys the rights to one of England's qualifying matches for the 1998 World Cup and two international games of England's rugby union tour of Argentina.
- 1998
  - February – For the first time, the BBC does not show England's matches in the Five Nations Championships. Live coverage is on Sky Sports and highlights are on ITV.
- 1999
  - October – The BBC takes over as broadcaster of the Heineken Cup, although it had shown some action from the tournament in some parts of the UK for the previous two seasons.

== 2000s ==
- 2000
  - Channel 5 broadcasts weekly highlights of the Aviva Premiership, and does so for just one season.
- 2001
  - May – The four-year deal between HTV Wales and S4C for the coverage of Welsh domestic club rugby ends. HTV Wales elects not to tender for the new deal, and BBC Wales and S4C take over, with the new deal giving each channel a live game each weekend, thus two live matches a weekend. BBC Wales show theirs on a Friday night, S4C a Saturday night as per the previous deal.
  - 11 August – The ITV Sport Channel launches. Although the channel is mostly focussed on football it does show other sport, including the secondary rights to the Heineken Cup.
- 2002
  - February – The BBC once again holds the rights to the entire Six Nations Championship.
- 2003
  - 22 October – Sky becomes the new broadcaster of rugby union's European clubs tournament Heineken Cup, replacing the BBC which had shown the tournament since the late 1990s.
- 2004
  - No events.
- 2005
  - After nearly 40 years on air, Rugby Special ends although it does return on an ad hoc basis a decade later.
- 2006
  - No events.
- 2007
  - No events.
- 2008
  - No events.
- 2009
  - 30 July – ESPN announces that they will cover the French Top 14 live. In addition, ESPN broadcasts live international clashes featuring New Zealand, Samoa and South Africa.
  - 6 September – The first edition of Scottish television's rugby union programme STV Rugby is broadcast after a deal with the Celtic League Association, Scottish Rugby and STV was reached, following the closure of Setanta Sports in the UK.

== 2010s ==
- 2010
  - 16 July – ESPN begins showing the pre-season J.P. Morgan Asset Management Premiership Rugby 7s Series Series. The new tournament, which took place over July and August 2010, involves all 12 Premiership Rugby clubs competing in Friday evening games. The broadcaster also showed the 2011 and 2012 tournaments. BT Sport now shows this after the acquisition of ESPN by BT Sport.
  - September – ESPN starts broadcasting live coverage of 43 matches per season from the English Premiership. The agreement also provides highlight rights for use on ESPN digital media such as ESPNScrum.com. Sky Sports will continue to show 26 live games per season plus the other semi-final.
- 2011
  - No events.
- 2012
  - 17 August – Premier Sports buys the rights to the French Top 14 league, usually broadcasting two live games per round. It shows the league for just a single season.
  - September – BT wins the rights to Premiership Rugby and its associated 7s Series, and in November it picks up the rights to American, Brazilian, French and Italian top-flight football.
- 2013
  - STV Rugby is broadcast for the final time.
  - 28–30 June – Sky Sports shows the 2013 Rugby World Cup Sevens with a one-hour review of the tournament shown later on ITV4.
- 2014
  - No events.
- 2015
  - July – The BBC and ITV join forces to stop Sky Sports from picking up live coverage of the Six Nations Championship. The two terrestrial broadcasts will share coverage of the event from 2017 onwards.
  - September – S4C begins showing one live match from each round of the Pro 12. It had previously shown coverage in highlights form since the league's conception as the Celtic League in 2001.
  - December – Coverage of The Varsity Match returns to free-to-air television as part of a new contract between the BBC and the RFU.
- 2016
  - September – BT Sport becomes the official UK broadcast partner of rugby union's European Champions and Challenge Cup competitions.
  - November – Premier Sports begins broadcasting France's autumn internationals and in 2018 begins broadcasting Italy's autumn internationals.
- 2017
  - February – The BBC and ITV begin a five-year contract as joint broadcasters of the Six Nations Championship. They had joined forces to prevent the tournament being sold to pay television.
  - 9–26 August – ITV and ITV4 show the 2017 Women's Rugby World Cup live with the final broadcast live on ITV.
  - September – Channel 5 takes over from ITV as broadcaster of highlights of the Premiership Rugby . The deal also sees five matches per season broadcast live by the channel. This is the first time that the league has been shown live on terrestrial TV. The also includes highlights of the Premiership Rugby Cup.
- 2018
  - The BBC's coverage of the PRO14 Rugby ends when the rights are sold to Premier Sports. The BBC had covered the competition since its inception in 2001.
  - 12 May – Sky's coverage of the European Rugby Champions Cup ends after 15 years of coverage of the event when the rights to the tournament transfer to BT Sport. It also loses its coverage of the Pro14 competition to Premier Sports.
  - 2 June – Channel 4 shows live rugby union for the first time when it broadcasts live coverage of Wales' summer tour.
  - 31 August – Premier Sports takes over as broadcaster of the PRO14 Rugby. The agreement sees all 152 games per season broadcast live, with no less than 21 games (one per round) shown live free-to-air on FreeSports. Sky Sports and the BBC had been the previous broadcasters – the BBC had shown the tournament since its inception in 2001. The start of the contract sees Premier Sports launch a second channel – Premier Sports 2.
  - October – Channel 4 expands its rugby union coverage when it begins showing one match from each round from the Heineken Cup. It also replaces Sky Sports as broadcaster of Ireland's Autumn internationals.
- 2019
  - November – Coverage of The Varsity Match returns to ITV which shows both the men's and women's matches on ITV4.

== 2020s ==
- 2020
  - 13 November – Channel 4 shows live and recorded coverage of rugby union's Autumn Nations Cup. Channel 4 shows live coverage of Ireland's matches and highlights of all other games.
  - 14 November – Amazon Prime Video broadcasts rugby union for the first time when it begins showing the Autumn Nations Cup. Ireland's matches are shown on Channel 4 and Wales' games are broadcast on S4C.
- 2021
  - 3–24 April – The BBC is the exclusive broadcaster of the 2021 Women's Six Nations Championship. Previously the tournament had been shared between the BBC, and Sky Sports which had shown the England matches.
  - 28 May – Premier Sports begins showing coverage of French rugby union's top flight competition – Top 14.
  - July–August –
    - Channel 4 broadcasts highlights of the three test matches of the 2021 British & Irish Lions tour to South Africa. This is the first time since 1993 that coverage of the British & Irish Lions has been shown on free-to-air television.
    - Sky Sports Action is rebranded as Sky Sports The Lions. This channel is dedicated to coverage of the 2021 British & Irish Lions tour to South Africa and mixes live and recorded action of the current tour with Sky's coverage of previous tours.
  - 27 August – BBC Northern Ireland secures a three-year deal with Ulster's United Rugby Championship (URC) to screen home matches, and will air six games over the 2021–22 season.
  - 30 October – Amazon Prime Video begins showing almost all of the autumn international matches played by the six Nations countries. The only exception is Ireland's matches which are seen on Channel 4 although Ireland's games will move to Amazon in 2022.
- 2022
  - 30 January – Premiership Rugby returns to ITV screens and the new deal sees ITV show a live match for the first time. ITV will show 12 live matches over the two years of the contract, including the Premiership Final, as well as a weekly highlights show in ITV4.
  - 18 June – The Premiership Final will be shown live on free-to-air television for the first time.
  - October – ITV replaces Channel 4 as terrestrial broadcaster of the Heineken Cup. BT Sport continues as the pay television broadcaster of the tournament.
  - 9 December – Viaplay Sports starts showing European Professional Club Rugby's second-tier competition the EPCR Challenge Cup. The European Rugby Champions Cup continues to be broadcast by BT Sport.
- 2023
  - No events.
- 2024
  - 10 February – ITV and Guinness trial live audio described commentary for blind and partially sighted viewers of the 2024 Six Nations match between England and Wales.
  - Late autumn – Premier Sports launches a full time rugby union channel following its capture from TNT Sports of the rights to EPCR's Champions Cup and Challenge Cup for the next three seasons.
- 2025
  - 14 March – The BBC and ITV agree a new four-year deal to air the Six Nations Championship keeping it on free-to-air television until 2029. Under the deal, which begins in 2026, ITV will show ten matches, including all England games, while the BBC will air at least five games involving Scotland and Wales. The BBC will also have exclusive rights to the Women's Six Nations Championship and the Under-20 Six Nations Championship.
  - 25 March – Premier Sports's full time rugby union channel launches as a linear channel for Premier Sports subscribers, but only on Virgin Media.

== See also ==
- Timeline of BBC Sport
- Timeline of ITV Sport
- Timeline of sport on Channel 4
- Timeline of sport on Channel 5
- Timeline of Sky Sports
- Timeline of BT Sport
- Timeline of Premier Sports
- Timeline of other British sports channels
