= Timeline of other British sports channels =

This is a timeline of sports channels in the UK other than Sky Sports, BT Sport and Premier Sports/FreeSports. The timeline also includes sports events which were shown on non-sports non-terrestrial channels. The timeline also includes sports coverage broadcast on streaming services.

== 1980s ==
- 1981
  - Screensport is by founded Bob Kennedy. This is the first proposal for a sports channel to operate in the UK.
- 1982
  - No events.
- 1983
  - No events.
- 1984
  - February – Ahead of its launch, Screensport completes a programming deal with Trans World International, giving the channel access to events taking place around the world.
  - 29 March – Screensport launches. Initially all coverage is pre-recorded and the channel broadcasts for just a few hours each day.
  - 31 August – Screensport shows its first live event - greyhound racing.
- 1985
  - 17 May – Screensport covers the Football League Trophy Southern Area Final between Brentford and Newport County. This is the first time a match in an English senior football competition is shown exclusively on a satellite channel. The Northern equivalent and the Wembley final would also be shown.
  - 17 September – Screensport covers, and sponsors, the Football League Super Cup, a competition designed to compensate clubs banned from European competition following the Heysel Stadium disaster. This is the only English club competition shown on television in the UK in the first half of the 1985/86 season.
- 1986
  - 30 September – Screensport broadcasts the final of what was to be the only Football League Super Cup.
  - 1 December – The WHSmith Television Group takes over the operation and management of Screensport after Bob Kennedy and ABC pull out.
- 1987
  - July – Screensport signs a deal with Thames Television, who were the Football League's agent for international distribution, to transmit 34 recorded matches via cable and satellite. Thames produced its programme, called the Big League Soccer. This resulted in Screensport being the only place where viewers could get extended highlights of the league during the 1987/88 season.
- 1988
  - 8 June – Rupert Murdoch announces plans to launch a four-channel service on the soon to be launched Astra satellite. One of these channels will be a sports service.
  - August - Weekly highlights of First Division matches in the 1988-89 season are shown on satellite and cable via Super Channel. The channel relays the Chrysalis Television produced English Soccer programme, whilst also becoming the home of Dutch football during the campaign.
  - 5 September – S4C launches a sports programme called Sgorio. The programme is set up to provide highlights of European football, including highlights of games from La Liga and Serie A, although other sports are also included within the programme.
  - 7 December – ESPN increases its stake in Screensport from 3.5% to 25.5% after purchasing shares from WHSmith for £4.4 million. By then, Screensport had increased its sports content, allowing the channel to broadcast for 18.5 hours each day. The schedule includes ice hockey, skiing, golf, tennis, and yachting.
  - 3 October - Screensport gains the rights to the Spanish League, and begins weekly full match coverage.
- 1989
  - 5 February – Sky Television launches at 6 pm. They include a pan-European sports channel, Eurosport which Sky co-founds with the European Broadcasting Union. The channel's first night is dominated by winter sports, which Eurosport has broadcast live and in depth ever since.
  - February – Screensport begins broadcasting on the Astra 1A satellite, thereby massively extending its reach across the UK.

== 1990s ==
- 1990
  - 25 March – BSB launches and among the channel line-up is a sports channel called The Sports Channel.
- 1991
  - 20 April – Following the merger between Sky TV and BSB, BSB's Sport Channel closes and is replaced the next day by Sky Sports.
  - 6–22 May – Eurosport briefly closes after the competing Screensport channel had filed a complaint to the European Commission over its corporate structure. TF1 Group subsequently steps in and replaces BSkyB as Eurosport's joint owners.
- 1992
  - No events.
- 1993
  - 1 March – Screensport closes following its merger with Eurosport in the hope that one would become financially profitable.
- 1994
  - A deal with Chrysalis Sport sees cable station Wire TV make a push into sports broadcasting and Wire launches an evening sports programming block called Sportswire. Sport shown includes Vauxhall Conference football, BDO Darts and Lennox Lewis's WBC title fights.
- 1995
  - January – Eurosport replaces Sky Sports as the broadcaster of tennis' Australian Open and has broadcast the event in full ever since.
  - June – TCI (owners of Telewest) and NYNEX do a deal with BSkyB which includes a clause that the cable operators do not launch any rival channels to those already operated by Sky. This causes the collapse of Sportswire, days before its launch as a full-time channel.
  - 7–28 October – L!VE TV broadcasts many of the matches from the 1995 Rugby League World Cup. It shows many of them exclusively as the main broadcaster, BBC Sport, only shows four matches live from the entire tournament although Wales' three matches are shown on S4C.
  - L!VE TV also shows coverage of that year's World Masters darts tournament - its predecessor Wire TV had shown the event for the previous two years. However, L!VE would only show the event once as from the following year, the event moved to Eurosport where it stayed until 2000.
  - The Racing Channel launches, thereby becoming the UK's first channel devoted to a single sport.
- 1996
  - 13 October – Formula One coverage on Eurosport ends. It had shown full race weekend coverage of the event since the early days of the channel and had been the only place to see the practice and qualifying sessions as the BBC had only shown the actual race prior to the 1996 Formula One World Championship.
- 1997
  - A Welsh-language rugby union programme Clwb Rygbi launches on S4C. It is produced by BBC Sport.
- 1998
  - 10 September – MUTV launches, becoming the first football club channel to start broadcasting in the UK.
- 1999
  - 18 January – British Eurosport launches. The change sees the introduction of live studio presentation of major events.
  - 1 May – Extreme Sports Channel launches.
  - September – Champions on 28 and Champions on 99 launch to provide live and recorded coverage of the UEFA Champions League. The channels are only available to ONdigital customers.

== 2000s ==
- 2000
  - September – ONsport launches. It replaces Champions on 28 and Champions on 99, which had reflected the channel numbers these were broadcast on. These channels were re-branded respectively as ONsport 1 and ONsport 2, after ONdigital had purchased rights to the ATP Masters Series tennis. Whilst ONsport 1 broadcast 24 hours a day, ONsport 2 timeshared with Carlton Cinema and was only on air to provide coverage of an alternate Champions League match.
- 2001
  - March – Motorsports channel Motors TV launches in the UK.
  - 11 August – ONsport closes following the launch of the ITV Sport Channel.
- 2002
  - 1 March – F1 Digital+ launches. It offers enhanced multi-screen coverage of Formula One on a pay-per-view basis.
  - 1 May – At The Races launches.
  - 13 August – Chelsea TV launches.
  - 5 December – NASN launches to show live and recorded coverage of North American sports.
  - 12 December – After just one season, F1 Digital+ closes.
- 2003
  - January –
    - Eurosport takes over as broadcaster of Serie A, opting to show a match at peak-time whereas Channel 4 had shown its live coverage in the afternoon.
    - The Racing Channel closes. It had been on air since 1995.
  - Eurosport broadcasts snooker for the first time. The channel goes on to provide extensive coverage of the sport both in the UK and across Europe.
- 2004
  - 15 March – The Wrestling Channel launches. It had been on air for the previous three months as a programming block on Friendly TV.
  - 29 March – At the Races closes down due to financial problems.
  - 29 May – Racing UK launches.
  - 11 June – At the Races relaunches as a stand-alone venture without Channel Four.
  - 26 July – Celtic TV and Rangers TV launch.
  - August – Irish sports broadcaster Setanta Sports takes over from the BBC as the UK rights holder of the Scottish Premier League.
- 2005
  - 10 January – Eurosport launches a second channel, Eurosport 2.
  - September – Bravo and Setanta Sports take over coverage of Serie A under a joint agreement from 2005 to the end of the 2006–07 season.
  - 7 October – UKTV announces that it will begin showing sport, and 2006 sees UKTV G2 show highlights of the RBS Six Nations rugby union championship, extensive coverage of the 2006 FIFA World Cup as a sub-licensing of the BBC's rights to the tournament, and basketball, including the quarter-finals of Euroleague Basketball and the 2006 FIBA World Championship.
- 2006
  - 8 March – Racing TV launches an international racing channel Racing World. Consequently, racing TV concentrates on UK horse racing.
  - 13 March –
    - NASN buys the rights to show ten live Major League Baseball games a week.
    - The UK's first classic sports channel ESPN Classic launches.
  - 17–18 June – Motors TV broadcasts the Le Mans 24 Hours race in its entirety. It also shows the 2007 race.
  - 25 August – Setanta Sports brings regular non league football to television when it acquires the rights to the Football Conference. The deal also sees the Conference Cup renamed the Setanta Cup.
  - 4 December – The Wrestling Channel relaunches as TWC Fight!
  - 23 December – Bravo decides to drop its coverage of Serie A due to poor viewing figures. The league does continue to be shown by Setanta Sports.
- 2007
  - 11 January – Following Setanta Sports’ purchase of rights to the PGA Tour, the company launches a dedicated golf channel Setanta Golf.
  - March – ESPN buys NASN and the purchase sees the return of ESPN's flagship magazine shows, such as Baseball Tonight, Around the Horn, The Sports Reporters and Pardon the Interruption, which had not been shown since the previous year after the contract between NASN and ESPN ended.
  - 9 June – S4C shows the first of four Celtic Crusaders rugby league matches live. The following season, S4C shows five more Celtic Crusaders games.
  - 11 August – Setanta Sports shows the first of its 46 matches from the Premier League.
  - September – Frank Warren's Sports Network promotions moves, for the most part, to Setanta Sports although fights involving Amir Khan continue to be shown on ITV.
  - 20 September – LFC TV, a dedicated official channel for English football club Liverpool F.C., launches.
  - 29 November – Setanta Sports News launches. The channel launches following a dispute which saw Sky Sports News and the other Sky basics channels removed from Virgin Media and this launch is seen by the cable company as a replacement sports news channel. The channel is jointly owned by both companies with ITN producing the channel's content.
  - 31 December – The Golf Channel UK closes due to it not being able to attract a viable audience due to not broadcasting enough live tournaments.
- 2008
  - 14 January – Arsenal TV launches.
  - January – TWC Fight! Is relaunched as The Fight Network (UK & Ireland) following the purchase of the channel by Canadian company The Fight Network.
  - February – Setanta Sports begins broadcasting one live game a week from the British Basketball League.
  - 18 May – Setanta Sports shows full live coverage of the first cricket Indian Premier League.
  - 14–15 June – Coverage of Le Mans moves to Eurosport.
  - August – Setanta Sports begins showing the England football team and the FA Cup following ITV becoming the primary rights holder of both in its new deal with the FA. Setanta shows 17 FA Cup games, including one semi-final exclusively and shared coverage with ITV of the final. Consequently, the BBC has no rights to any form of coverage of the FA Cup for the very first time.
  - 1 December – The Fight Network (UK & Ireland) closes.
- 2009
  - 1 February – NASN is renamed ESPN America following the sale in late 2006 of the channel to ESPN.
  - 22 June – It is announced that ESPN will take over the 46 games per season that were shown on Setanta Sports after Setanta failed to make a £10m payment to the rights holder which meant that the rights returned to the Premier League which allowed it to sell those rights to another broadcaster.
  - 23 June – Setanta Sports ceases broadcasting in the UK after going into administration. The closure means that sister channels Setanta Golf and Setanta Sports News also stop broadcasting and from this date, football club channels Celtic TV and Rangers TV, which were sold as part of the Setanta package, close although both later relaunch as online only channels. Arsenal TV does continue but closes just over a month later.
  - 25 June – Eurosport picks up the television rights to golf's PGA Tour for the remainder of the 2009 season. However the coverage only lasts for six months as the rights return to Sky Sports at the start of 2010.
  - 3 August – ESPN launches in the UK, picking up many of the rights previously held by Setanta Sports. These include the rights to the Premier League that Setanta had held. It later adds many other football rights to its portfolio, including the Scottish Premier League, FA Cup, European club football and the Europa League
  - 8 August – ESPN becomes the exclusive broadcaster of the Ultimate Fighting Championship.
  - 24 August – Racing World closes after just over three years on air.
  - 25 September – ESPN beings National Rugby League to the UK when it broadcasts the first Preliminary Final live on 25 September, the second Preliminary Final and on 4 October it shows the Grand Final.
  - 17 October – Pay-per-view channel Primetime launches when it shows pay-per-view coverage of the Super Six World Boxing Classic.

== 2010s ==
- 2010
  - 1 March – A European edition of SportsCenter starts to be broadcast five nights a week on ESPN America.
  - 10–12 March – ESPN shows the first ever Winter X Games Europe.
  - 12–14 March – ESPN broadcasts the 2010 World Indoor Athletic Championships.
  - 21 June – ESPN America begins broadcasting in high definition.
  - 22–31 July – ESPN shows the inaugural Caribbean Twenty20 cricket tournament.
  - 29 July-1 August – Bravo shows darts for the first and only time when it broadcasts the 2010 European Championship.
  - August – S4C beings showing a live match from the Welsh Premier League each Saturday afternoon. The live game replaces a weekly 30-minute highlights programme.
  - September – ESPN starts broadcasting live coverage of 43 matches per season from the English Premiership. The agreement also provides highlight rights for use on ESPN digital media such as ESPNScrum.com. Sky Sports will continue to show 26 live games per season plus the other semi-final.
- 2011
  - 12 January – ESPN signs a deal to show exclusive coverage of the World Rally Championship. ESPN will screen 30-minute nightly bulletins at the end of every WRC day, with on-event coverage bookended by an hour-long preview and review show.
  - 13 April – ESPN shows the first of six matches from the newly-formed FA Women's Super League.
  - 6 July – ESPN announces a deal with the British Darts Organisation which sees it become exclusive broadcaster of the World Masters along with other BDO tournaments and a share of the coverage of the BDO World Darts Championship.
  - 14 July – Boxing channel BoxNation launches.
- 2012
  - 7 January – ESPN breaks the BBC's monopoly on covering the BDO World Darts Championship. This begins a pattern which continues with BT Sport from 2014 whereby two broadcasters share the rights with ESPN (and from 2014 BT Sport) showing the weeknight evening coverage exclusively live with all other coverage shared between both broadcasters.
  - April – ESPN America stops broadcasting a European version of SportsCentre, instead opting to broadcast an edited version of the 2am show produced in Los Angeles.
  - 12 June – The announcement of the rights to the Premier League for the next three seasons reveals that BT has won the rights to 38 matches each season. These rights are currently held by ESPN UK. The news followed speculation that ESPN was reconsidering its position in the UK.
  - 11–31 August – ESPN shows the first edition of cricket's Sri Lanka Premier League.
  - September – ESPN starts showing one game per round from the UEFA Europa League after it acquired secondary rights to the competition with ITV being the primary rights holder.
  - 20–23 September – ESPN shows the 2012 Darts European Championship, thereby becoming the first broadcaster in Britain to show both BDO and PDC tournaments at the same time.
- 2013
  - 25 February – BT agrees to acquire ESPN's UK and Ireland TV channels business, consisting of ESPN and ESPN America. BT will continue to broadcast at least one ESPN branded channel as part of its BT Sport package of services.
  - March – British Eurosport begins to show FIM World Speedway. Eurosport replaces Sky Sports, who had been the rights holder for over a decade.
  - 1 August – At midnight, and ahead of the launch of BT Sport, ESPN UK, ESPN America and ESPN Classic close - the latter was not part of the BT/ESPN deal.
  - 9 September – Eurosport becomes the new broadcast of the NFL's Monday Night Football. Eurosport broadcasts the weekly American football game for the next two seasons.
  - 26 October – The British Basketball League decides to create its own internet-based channel to show its matches rather than selling the rights to traditional television stations although it does do a deal with British Eurosport to show weekly highlights.
  - 21 December – Pay-per-view channel Primetime closes.
- 2014
  - 4–9 February – Eurosport shows the first edition of the BDO World Trophy. It also shows the 2015 and 2017 events - Premier Sports shows the 2016 tournament.
  - 8 February – BoxNation begins broadcasting in high definition.
  - 21 July – QUEST shows sports coverage for the first time when it broadcasts the 2014 Schalke 04 Cup - a pre-season tournament featuring the likes of Newcastle United F.C. and West Ham United F.C.
  - 9 October – Motors TV launches on Freeview.
- 2015
  - 9 June – ESPN is rebranded as BT Sport ESPN.
  - September – S4C begins showing one live match from each round of rugby union's Pro 12 competition. It had previously shown coverage in highlights form since the league's conception as the Celtic League in 2001.
  - 13 November – British Eurosport changes its names to Eurosport 1.
  - 10 December – Bike launches in the UK.
- 2016
  - 6 January – UKTV announces that Dave will show its first live sporting event – a boxing match between David Haye and Mark de Mori at the O2 Arena on 16 January 2016. Later in the year Dave broadcasts the 2016 BDO World Trophy darts tournament and cricket's Caribbean Premier League.
  - 14 March – Racing UK begins broadcasting in high-definition.
  - 28–30 May – UKTV channel Dave makes a one-off return to darts when it shows the 2016 BDO World Trophy.
  - 27 June – Eurosport shows live and recorded coverage of the Wimbledon Tennis Championships for the first time, thereby becoming the first commercial pay-TV broadcaster to air live UK coverage from the All England Club. Its live coverage is restricted to the finals weekend. This is the first time since 1968 that the BBC has not been the exclusive broadcaster of Wimbledon in the UK.
  - Eurosport makes some of its snooker coverage available on free-to-air television when it begins simulcasting coverage on free-to-air channel Quest.
  - October – A free-to-air sports channel Front Runner launches.
  - 31 December – Extreme Sports Channel stops broadcasting in the UK after 14 years on air.
- 2017
  - 1 March – Motors TV relaunches itself as Motorsport.tv. The change also sees the channel start to broadcast in high definition.
  - Front Runner shows the 2017 British GT Championship.
  - 26–29 May – The 2017 BDO World Trophy is broadcast by Front Runner. The channel also shows the England Open the following month.
  - May – Dave replaces Sky Sports as broadcaster of tennis' Tie Break Tens tournament.
  - 28 August-10 September – Eurosport shows the US Open for the final time. It had held exclusive rights to the past two tournaments and prior to this it had obtained secondary rights to the event with Sky Sports being the main rights holder.
  - September – After less than two years on air, Bike closes.
- 2018
  - 7 June – It is announced that Amazon Prime has been awarded the rights to livestream 20 Premier League matches a season for the next three seasons.
  - 18 June – Amazon Prime shows its first live sport in the UK when it broadcasts live coverage of the Queen's Club tennis tournament.
  - August – Eleven Sports UK and Ireland launches following deals with European football leagues, including Serie A and La Liga. The platform is a streaming service rather than a television channel.
  - 8 August – EFL on Quest is broadcast for the first time following the transfer of the highlights right to the English Football League to Quest.
  - 9–12 August – Eleven Sports broadcasts the 2018 PGA Championship, meaning that for the first time, a major golf event in the UK is only available on a streaming platform. However, the event returns to Sky Sports the following year.
  - 27 August – Amazon Prime broadcasts the US Open for the first time. This is the first time that a major sporting event has only been available via a streaming-only platform.
  - 30 September – After more than 17 years on air, Motorsport.tv, previously known as Motors TV, closes its linear channel, switching to online-streaming only.
  - 17 December – Racing UK rebrands itself as Racing TV.
- 2019
  - January – Just four months after going on air, Eleven Sports relinquishes most of its football rights, passing many of them onto Premier Sports.
  - February – Amazon Prime takes over as the UK broadcaster of the tennis ATP World Tour.
  - 30 June – After 18 seasons on air, Chelsea TV closes as a linear channel. It continues as an online-only service.
  - 3 December – Amazon Prime shows its first set of live Premier League football matches.

== 2020s ==
- 2020
  - 6 January – Amazon Prime Video expands its coverage of tennis when it takes over as the UK broadcaster of the WTA, showing 49 tournaments a year.
  - March – Eurosport replaces BT Sport as rights holder to British Speedway.
  - 16 June – Eurosport begins showing Norway's premier domestic football competition Eliteserien.
  - 8 September – It is announced that all of September's Premier League fixtures will be shown on TV due to fans not being into stadiums due to the COVID-19 pandemic. This includes a weekly 3pm Saturday afternoon match, shown on TV in the UK for the first time, one of which is shown on Amazon Prime.
  - 14 November – Amazon Prime Video broadcasts rugby union for the first time when it begins showing the Autumn Nations Cup. Ireland's matches are shown on Channel 4 and Wales' games are broadcast on S4C.
- 2021
  - 1 February – Coverage of UK greyhound racing moves to a new channel called Sporty Stuff HD, which broadcasts on satellite. The sport had previously been shown on Live 360 - an offshoot of Nigerian news channel Arise News - since the closure of Front Runner TV. Sporty Stuff also shows lesser-known motorsport events.
  - 13 May – The Premier League announces that, for the first time, the next three-year broadcasting contact has been awarded without a bidding process. Consequently, Amazon Prime is paying the same amount for the same packages as it did for the 2019-2022 contact.
  - July – Fights promoted by Eddie Hearn's Matchroom Sport move from Sky Sports to streaming service DAZN. The first live event is shown on 31 July.
  - 30 October – Amazon Prime Video begins showing almost all of the autumn international matches played by the six Nations countries. The only exception is Ireland's matches which are seen on Channel 4 although Ireland's games will move to Amazon in 2022.
- 2022
  - 2–10 April – Eurosport becomes the exclusive broadcaster of the World Darts Federation's World Championships.
  - May – EFL on Quest will be broadcast for the final time as highlights of the English Football League will transfer from Quest to ITV.
  - June – For the first time, the French Open tennis tournament will be shown exclusively on pay television following Eurosport obtaining exclusive coverage of the event. It had previously been shown on ITV and before then by the BBC.
  - 11 September – Amazon Prime ends its coverage of the US Open (tennis) as part of its pullback from covering the sport. The event returns to Sky Sports in 2023.
  - 24-26 September – Eurosport becomes the exclusive broadcast of tennis' Laver Cup, and will show the event until 2030.
  - October – The National Hockey League's UK TV rights move to Scandinavian streaming service Viaplay as part of its UK launch.
- 2023
  - 21 February – Warner Bros. Discovery EMEA announces that the Eurosport brand will disappear and that the UK channels will be folded into TNT Sports, expected to be no sooner than the 2024 Summer Olympics, but no later than the 2026 Winter Olympics.
  - 29 March - 28 May – DAZN broadcasts cricket for the first time when it shares coverage with Sky Sports of the 2023 Indian Premier League.
  - December - Amazon Prime's coverage of tennis' ATP tour ends after five years. The rights return to Sky Sports.
- 2024
  - September – DAZN becomes the broadcaster the newly launched British Basketball League, which replaces the British Basketball League as the competition for men's professional basketball in the UK.
- 2025
  - 28 February – Eurosport closes in the UK and Ireland after 36 years when TNT Sports incorporates the coverage previously showed on Eurosport. This includes the Olympic Games, cycling (including the Tour de France), snooker, tennis (including three of the four majors) and winter sports.
  - April – Queensberry Promotions boxing moves from TNT Sports to DAZN.
  - May – Amazon ends its six seasons of broadcasting Premier League football as the rights it held move to Sky Sports after the Premier League opted not to offer the rights that Amazon held as a package this time round.
  - 29 August – The NCAA moves to DAZN following an agreement with ESPN to show games broadcast by ESPN (and ABC). Games shown by other broadcasters, such as Fox and CBS, are initially not shown as part of this deal. Sky Sports continues to show Notre Dame home games live on Sky Sports NFL due to Notre Dame's home games being shown on NBC.
  - 11 October – DAZN begins to show College Football games from the Big Ten Conference.
- 2026
- 2027
  - Live coverage of the Champions League will transfer to streaming services. Amazon Prime will show the Tuesday fixtures with Paramount+ broadcasting the Wednesday games.

== See also ==
- Timeline of BBC Sport
- Timeline of ITV Sport
- Timeline of sport on Channel 4
- Timeline of sport on Channel 5
- Timeline of Sky Sports
- Timeline of TNT Sports
- Timeline of Premier Sports
