= Ned Boulting =

British sports commentator

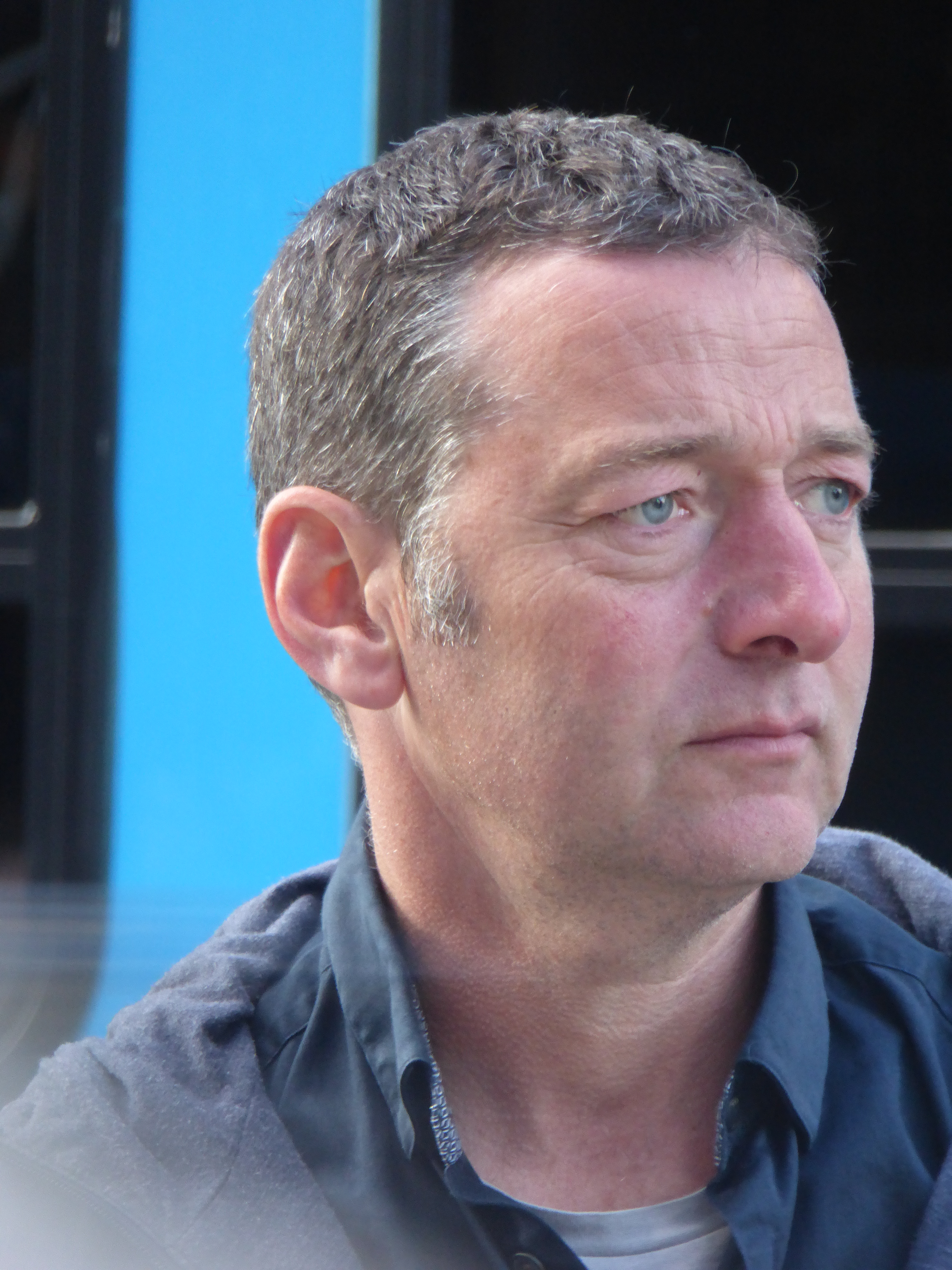
- Boulting in 2019
- Born: Norris Edward Boulting; 11 July 1969 (age 56); Andover, Hampshire, England, UK
- Occupation: TV presenter
- Notable credit(s): Sky Sports (1997–2001); ITV Sport (2001–present); Channel 4 (2012); Bike (2016–2017)

Norris Edward Boulting (born 11 July 1969) is a British sports journalist, television presenter and podcaster best known for his coverage of football, cycling and darts.

== Early life and education ==
Boulting was born in Andover, Hampshire, but moved to Bedford as a child. He attended Bedford School, where he studied for A-levels in French, German and English, before reading modern languages at Jesus College, Cambridge. He is the grandson of film director John Boulting.

== Career ==
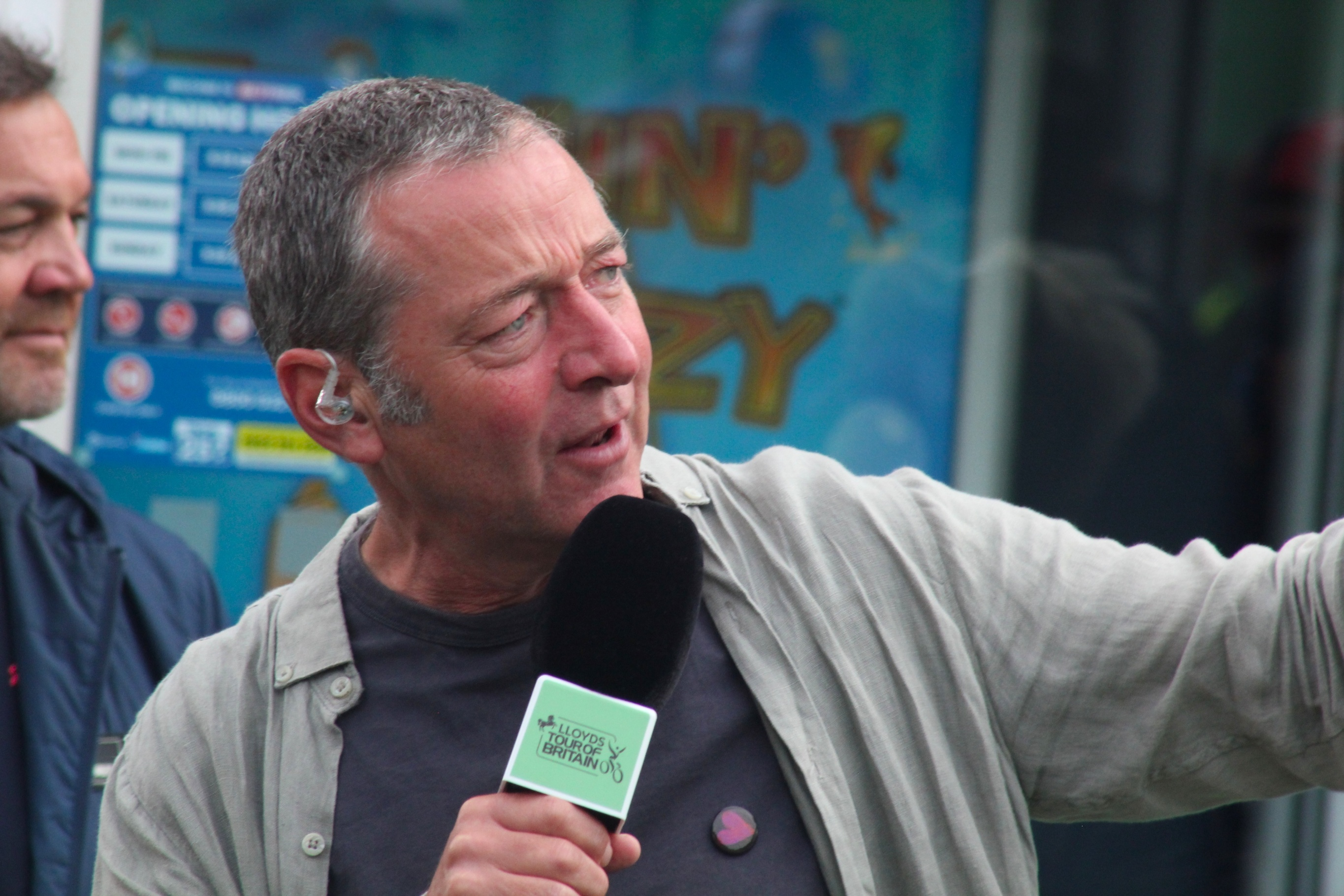
Boulting at the 2025 Tour of Britain.

After several "completely directionless" years, his television career began in 1997 when he joined Sky Sports' Soccer Saturday alongside Jeff Stelling. He joined ITV Sports in 2001, and has covered a range of football events including the UEFA Champions League, UEFA Europa League and the FA Cup. He became a reporter for ITV's Tour de France coverage in 2003 and has reported at every Tour since, as well as on other cycling events including the Tour of Britain and the Vuelta a España. He also covered the London 2012 Summer Paralympics for Channel 4. He was awarded the Royal Television Society's Sports News Reporter of the Year Award in 2006. Boulting branched out into commentating in 2015, providing commentary for ITV4's coverage of the inaugural Tour de Yorkshire and the Vuelta a España alongside David Millar. Boulting and Millar commentated for ITV4 on the 2016 Tour de France and subsequent ones. Boulting produced and directed Dutch Master – A tribute to Dennis Bergkamp for Sky Sports in 1998, and Steven Gerrard – A Year in My Life for Sky 1 in 2006.

Following on from the success of his Bikeology tour, in 2018 Ned announced his revamped 'Tour de Ned'. A one-man theatrical cycling roadshow that tours the UK in conjunction with the Tour de France from 28 September – 17 November.

Boulting made his darts commentary debut at the 2020 Masters after being a long term pundit for ITV Sport PDC events.

Since April 2020 Boulting has co-presented the podcast Streets Ahead with Adam Tranter and Laura Laker. The podcast involves discussions of active travel infrastructure and often includes interviewing guests.

Boulting has co-presented the cycling podcast"Never strays Far" since 2019, and launched the cycling racing podcast "For The Love of Cycling" in 2026

== Books ==
- How I Won the Yellow Jumper: Dispatches from the Tour de France (Yellow Jersey Press, 2011) ISBN 978-0224083362
- How Cav Won the Green Jersey: Short Dispatches from the 2011 Tour de France (Vintage Digital, 2012)
- On The Road Bike: The Search for a Nation’s Cycling Soul (Yellow Jersey Press, 2013) ISBN 978-0224083362
- 101 Damnations: Dispatches from the 101st Tour de France (Yellow Jersey Press, 2014) ISBN 978-0224099936
- Square Peg, Round Ball: Football, TV and Me (Bloomsbury, 2022) ISBN 9781472979261
- 1923: The Mystery of Lot 212 and a Tour de France Obsession (Bloomsbury, 2023) ISBN 9781399401548
- The Accidental Tour-ist: (Final) Dispatches from the Road (Bloomsbury, 2025) ISBN 978-1399419826
