= Sports Life Stories =

- Created by: ITV Sport
- Country of origin: United Kingdom
- No. of series: 3
- No. of episodes: 24

Production
- Running time: 60 Minutes
- Production company: ITV Sport

Original release
- Network: ITV4
- Release: 23 October 2012 – present

Sports Life Stories is an ITV Sport documentary series shown on ITV4 and ITV. Each episode is devoted to one sporting great and lets them tell their life story alongside contributions from friends and family as well as sporting archive. The first episode told the story of boxer Barry McGuigan and aired in October 2012 on ITV4. Reporters on the series have included Gabriel Clarke, Ned Boulting, Adam Darke and Leon Mann.

== Transmissions ==
Series	Episodes	Originally released	
Series	Episodes	First released	Last released
1	8	23 October 2012	11 December 2012
2	8	22 October 2013	17 December 2013
3	8	17 February 2015	14 April 2015

== Episodes ==
=== Series 1 (2012) ===
No. overall	No. in series	Guest	Directed by	Original release date
1	1	Barry McGuigan	Gabriel Clarke and Tim Mackenzie-Smith	23 October 2012
2	2	Gareth Thomas	Gabriel Clarke and Tim Mackenzie-Smith	30 October 2012
3	3	Ronnie O'Sullivan	Lewis Hurt	6 November 2012
4	4	Dame Kelly Holmes	Jason Bernard	13 November 2012
5	5	Lawrence Dallaglio	Tim Mackenzie-Smith	20 November 2012
6	6	Amir Khan	Gabriel Clarke and Neil Cox	27 November 2012
7	7	Fabrice Muamba	Gabriel Clarke and Lewis Hurt	4 December 2012
8	8	Brian Lara	Jason Bernard	11 December 2012

=== Series 2 (2013) ===
No. overall	No. in series	Guest	Directed by	Original release date
9	1	James Cracknell	Gabriel Clarke and Tim Mackenzie-Smith	22 October 2013
10	2	David Weir	James Williams	29 October 2013
11	3	Jermain Defoe	Tim Mackenzie-Smith	5 November 2013
12	4	Nicola Adams	Jay Gill	12 November 2013
13	5	Jimmy White	Lewis Hurt	26 November 2013
14	6	Eric Bristow	Gabriel Clarke and Tim Mackenzie-Smith	3 December 2013
15	7	Didier Drogba	Daniel Hart	10 December 2013
16	8	Chris Eubank	Gabriel Clarke and Guney Gok	17 December 2013

=== Series 3 (2015) ===
No. overall	No. in series	Guest	Directed by	Original release date
17	1	Peter Shilton	Lewis Hurt	17 February 2015
18	2	Chris Froome	Ned Boulting and Andrew Hill	24 February 2015
19	3	Paula Radcliffe	Luke Mellows	3 March 2015
20	4	Andy Cole	Shurwin Beckford and Laurence Koe	10 March 2015
21	5	Linford Christie	Adam Maynard	24 March 2015
22	6	John Barnes	Gabriel Clarke and Jay Gill	31 March 2015
23	7	Jason Robinson	Joe Blake-Turner	7 April 2015
24	8	Carl Froch	Martyn Reardon	14 April 2015

== Critical success ==
Sports Life Stories has been described as a 'first-class interview series' by broadcaster Des Lynam and as 'the best sports documentary series on television' by TV critic Ian Hyland. Sports Life Stories was awarded Television Programme of the Year 2013 at the Sports Journalists' Association Awards on 24 March 2014.
