= Terrestrial television in the United Kingdom =

Terrestrial television in the United Kingdom has come in two forms:

- Digital terrestrial television in the United Kingdom, the current system with over 50 channels available; and
- Analogue terrestrial television in the United Kingdom, an older system with five channels available, phased out by 2012
