= Timeline of BBC Sport =

This is a timeline of the history of BBC Sport.

== 1930s and 1940s ==
- 1936
  - 2 November – The BBC opens the world's first regular high-definition television service, from Alexandra Palace.
- 1937
  - 21 June – The BBC broadcasts television coverage of the Wimbledon Tennis Championships for the first time.
- 1938
  - 2 April – The BBC covers The Boat Race for the first time.
  - 30 April – The BBC broadcasts television coverage of the FA Cup for the first time.
- 1939
  - 1 September – The BBC Television Service is suspended, owing to the imminent outbreak of the Second World War.
- 1940 to 1945
  - Television is closed for the duration of the Second World War.
- 1946
  - 7 June – BBC Television broadcasts resume.
- 1947
  - 8 February – The BBC broadcasts the FA Cup fifth round match between Charlton Athletic and Blackburn Rovers, the first FA Cup match other than a final to be broadcast.
- 1948
  - 1 May – The BBC broadcasts the Rugby League Challenge Cup final for the first time. It did not broadcast the event again until 1952 and began annual coverage in 1958.
  - 29 July–14 August – The London Olympic Games is televised and the BBC broadcasts extensive live coverage.

== 1950s ==
- 1950
  - The BBC broadcasts commentary on a Formula 1 race for the first time, airing on radio with highlights on TV.
- 1951
  - The BBC broadcasts horse racing for the first time when it televises races from Ascot.
- 1954
  - 8 April – The first edition of Sportsview is broadcast.
  - 16 June - 4 July – The FIFA World Cup is broadcast by the BBC for the first time with selected matches shown live.
  - 30 December – The first BBC Sports Personality of the Year is awarded.
- 1955
  - 23 April – The 1955 Scottish Cup Final between Celtic and Clyde is the first final in Scotland to be televised live
  - The BBC broadcasts golf's Open Championship for the first time.
- 1956
  - The BBC broadcasts racing's Glorious Goodwood for the first time.
- 1958
  - 21 May – The Inaugural BBC Sportsview Trophy takes place, bringing greyhound racing to television. The BBC shows the event every year until 1997.
  - 10 October – The first broadcast of multi-sport Saturday afternoon television show Grandstand is broadcast.

== 1960s ==
- 1960
  - 26 March – The BBC broadcasts live coverage of The Grand National for the first time.
  - 1 June – ITV and the BBC both broadcast The Derby, as it was a "protected event" which could not be broadcast exclusively on either channel. However, the rest of the Epsom events, including The Oaks, are broadcast exclusively on ITV.
  - 25 August – The BBC shows live coverage of a non-UK Olympic Games for the first time.
- 1964
  - 23 June – Wimbledon: Match of the Day is broadcast for the first time, featuring "recorded highlights of today's outstanding match."
  - 22 August – The first broadcast of Match of the Day takes place. It is shown on the recently launched BBC2.
- 1965
  - 2 May – Sunday Cricket is broadcast for the first time. The programme, which runs throughout the afternoon on BBC2, features full coverage of a match "played under knock-out rules".
  - 6 October – The first edition of the BBC2 Floodlit Trophy is broadcast, bringing rugby league to television screens on a regular basis for the first time. The competition is designed specifically for television.
- 1966
  - 11–30 July – The BBC and ITV jointly host coverage of the 1966 World Cup. This arrangement continues to this day for both the FIFA World Cup and the UEFA European Championship.
  - The first edition of Rugby Special is broadcast, showing weekly highlights of rugby union matches.
- 1967
  - 1 July – Regular colour television transmissions begin on BBC2, starting with the Wimbledon tennis championships.
- 1968
  - 12 September – Sportsnight replaces Sportsview.
- 1969
  - 23 June – The BBC once again becomes the exclusive broadcaster of the Wimbledon Championships. Since 1955 the BBC had shared coverage of the tennis tournament with ITV.
  - 23 July – Snooker tournament Pot Black launches on BBC2. It is used as a way of showcasing colour television which had launched on the channel two years earlier.

== 1970s ==
- 1972
  - 4 November – Grandstand ends at approximately 3:50pm. It is followed by an episode of the 1969 Western series Lancer. Then, at approximately 4:40pm, Final Score airs as a separate programme, hosted by the same presenter as that of Grandstand earlier in the afternoon, the programme being on air in time for the vidiprinter sequence.
- 1973
  - 20 January – Grandstand, once again, becomes an afternoon-long programme.
  - Sportsnight moves from Thursdays to Wednesdays.
  - The BBC covers the World Snooker Championship for the first time, albeit in very limited form.
- 1974
  - August – Lunchtime preview show Football Focus launches. It is broadcast as a segment within Grandstand. ITV had been broadcasting its own lunchtime football preview programme for the previous six years.
  - The BBC shows darts for the first time when it covers that year's British Open.
- 1975
  - 9 August – Sportscene is broadcast for the first time, mainly to show highlights of Scottish football although the programme also covers other sports.
  - 16 August – The first edition of Scoreboard is shown on BBC1 Scotland. It is an opt-out from Grandstand intended to provide deeper coverage of the day's Scottish football news.
- 1977
  - 1 June – The BBC shows The Derby for the first time in three years. The race, and the rest of the Epsom meeting, is shown on ITV.
  - 12 September – The BBC broadcasts the US Open tennis tournament for the first time but coverage is restricted to next day highlights of the men's final. It also does the same in 1978.
- 1978
  - Ski Sunday is broadcast for the first time, thereby bringing skiing to television screens in the UK outside of the Winter Olympic Games for the first time.
  - 6–10 February – The BBC shows live coverage of the inaugural BDO World Darts Championship. Later in the year the BBC shows the first edition of a new tournament - the BDO Gold Cup.
  - 17-29 April – The BBC shows daily coverage of the World Snooker Championship for the first time.
  - 7 May – The first edition of Grand Prix is broadcast when the BBC provides highlights of the 1978 Monaco Grand Prix.
  - London Weekend Television wins exclusive rights to all league football coverage for ITV in a move termed "Snatch of the Day". Although the Office of Fair Trading blocked the move, the BBC is forced to allow ITV to take over the Saturday night slot in alternating seasons, beginning with the 1980-81 season.
- 1979
  - January – The BBC shows brief highlights of the inaugural World Indoor Bowls Championships, and has aired the championships ever since, with the level of coverage expanding over the years.
  - 6 June – The BBC shows The Derby for the last time until the year 2000.
  - June – The BBC broadcasts the AEGON Championships tennis tournament from Queen's Club for the first time.
  - 18 December – The final BBC2 Floodlit Trophy takes place. The programme ends due to financial cutbacks at the BBC.

== 1980s ==
- 1980
  - The BBC shows daily live coverage of the World Snooker Championship for the first time.
  - Match of the Day moves to Sunday afternoons for the 1980–81 season and again for the 1982–83 season.
- 1981
  - 29 March – The BBC covers the inaugural London Marathon, although it was not until 1984 that the BBC broadcast the event live and in full.
  - 17 May – Sunday Grandstand launches. It broadcasts during the summer months on BBC2. The programme includes weekly coverage of Sunday Cricket which had been shown on BBC2 since 1965.
  - 7 June – The BBC broadcasts coverage of the French Open for the first time. Coverage is restricted to finals weekend.
  - The BBC expands its coverage of darts when it shows the first edition of the British Professional Championship. It shows the event until it decides to cut back its coverage of darts in 1988.
- 1982
  - 3–9 October – As part of its coverage of the 1982 Commonwealth Games, the BBC broadcasts a two-hour breakfast programme Breakfast with Brisbane.
- 1983
  - 16 December – The BBC televises a live Football League game for the first time as part of a new joint BBC-ITV deal to show live league football.
- 1984
  - 6 January – The BBC and ITV show regular live FA Cup matches from the Third to the Sixth rounds for the first time. The first ever live game from the FA Cup on the BBC in the earlier rounds is the Third Round tie Liverpool v Newcastle
  - 28 July–12 August – BBC Television broadcasts the 1984 Summer Olympic Games. Due to the Games taking place in Los Angeles, the BBC stays on air into the night to provide live coverage of the major events. The BBC is the exclusive broadcaster of the event after an industrial dispute meant that ITV was unable to show the Games.
- 1985
  - The BBC loses the rights to UK athletics meetings to ITV.
- 1986
  - 12–13 April – The BBC shows live coverage of The Masters golf event for the first time, showing coverage of the final two rounds.
  - Autumn – The BBC launches regional versions of Rugby Special so that each nation can receiver fuller coverage of games from their country.
  - 19 November – As part of the BBC's new daytime television service, a Wednesday afternoon sports programme, Sports Afternoon launches. The programme broadcasts on Wednesday afternoon during the winter months BBC2 from around 2.35pm until 3.50pm although it is sometimes extended when live sport is being shown.
- 1987
  - 22 May-20 June – The BBC shows mostly recorded coverage of the first Rugby World Cup. This is the only time the BBC has ever shown the competition - ITV has held the rights ever since.
  - 9 October – Sports Afternoon is renamed Sport on Friday. As well as a change in broadcast day, the programme now runs for 90 minutes, beginning slightly earlier at around 14:15, although it is sometimes extended to show additional live coverage.
- 1988
  - The BBC shows a live First Division football match for the final time as coverage of football's top division moves in its entirety - both live and recorded - to ITV for the new season. Consequently, Match of the Day ends as a weekly programme.
  - Summer – The BBC announces that it will end all coverage of darts apart from the World Championships. ITV follows suit later in the year.
  - 17 September – The BBC starts to use a BBC Sport ident at the beginning of all sports coverage and this is broadcast for the first time at the start of the first programme covering the 1988 Olympic Games. This is also the first time that the BBC shows the Olympic Games live and in full, providing more than 12 hours of live coverage each day. Previously the BBC had only shown live coverage of the major events with no more than six hours of live coverage each day.
  - The BBC becomes the sole broadcaster of the FA Cup, and Match of the Day, which now only broadcasts on Cup weekends, is renamed Match of the Day: The Road to Wembley.
- 1989
  - 7 January – BBC Scotland launches an extended Saturday teatime results programme. Rather than opting out of the last few minutes of Grandstand, the programme, called Afternoon Sportscene, runs for the entire duration of the time allocated for the day's results, starting between one and five minutes before the network's English counterpart Final Score begins.
  - January – The BBC televises the Australian Open for the first time. However it is a one-off and does not cover the event again until 1995.
  - 23 July – The BBC broadcasts what was to be its final coverage of the rugby union British & Irish Lions when it shows live coverage of the final test match of the Lions’ 1989 British Lions tour to Australia.
  - 11 August – Friday Sportscene launches as a Friday night preview of the weekend's Scottish football. – 25 May 2001

== 1990s ==
- 1990
  - 24 January–3 February – The BBC broadcasts the 1990 Commonwealth Games. BBC1 stays on air all night to provide live coverage. This is the first time that BBC1 has provided full live coverage of an overseas Commonwealth Games, with around 12 hours of live action broadcast each day.
- 1992
  - 28 July-9 August – The BBC once again becomes the exclusive terrestrial broadcaster of the Summer Olympic Games, showing live coverage of the 1992 Olympics from 09:00 until late evening.
  - 15 August – The start of the Premier League sees the return of Match of the Day on a weekly basis, due to the BBC obtaining the highlights package to the new competition. The weekly coverage is supplemented by the BBC's ongoing coverage - both live and recorded - of the FA Cup, which the BBC also shares with Sky Sports. Football Focus also returns after a four-year hiatus.
- 1993
  - The BBC extends its daily live coverage of Wimbledon with coverage running until 8.30pm each night.
  - 24–26 September – The BBC shows live coverage of golf's Ryder Cup for the final time as from 1995 the coverage transfers to Sky Sports.
  - Autumn – The BBC begins displaying a score bug, a digital on-screen graphic displaying the current score. Initially used for football and rugby, this is later extended to other sports coverage.
- 1994
  - 15–17 March – Ahead of Channel 4 taking over as rights holder to race meetings at Cheltenham, the BBC shows The Cheltenham Festival for the final time.
  - 18 May – The BBC shows the 1994 European Cup Final. This brings to an end the BBC's association with football's premier European clubs tournament which had dated back to when the competition began almost four decades earlier.
  - 17 June–17 July – The BBC and ITV opt to only show live coverage of selected matches from the group stage of the 1994 World Cup, and it is only the knock-out stages of the tournament that are shown live and in full by the terrestrial broadcasters.
  - 18–28 August – The BBC broadcasts coverage of the 1994 Commonwealth Games from Victoria, Canada. Only the athletics events are shown live with all other sports, including swimming, restricted to next day highlights.
  - 30 October – Sportscene Rugby Special launches on BBC Scotland to cover Scottish rugby union with the live matches and highlights broadcast on BBC2 Scotland on Sunday teatimes.
- 1995
  - 15 May – The BBC launches a monthly cricket magazine called Gower's Cricket Monthly.
  - 9 July – For the first time, the BBC shows live coverage of the men's singles final on BBC1. Previously, it had been shown on BBC2 as part of Sunday Grandstand.
  - 10 September – BBC Wales launches a new rugby union programme, Scrum V. It replaces Rugby Special Wales.
- 1996
  - The BBC loses the rights to coverage of the England national rugby union team to Sky Sports.
  - 13 October – The final edition of Grand Prix is broadcast when BBC Sport shows live coverage of the final race of the 1996 Formula One World Championship, the 1996 Japanese Grand Prix. The programme returns in 2009 when the BBC regains the rights to Formula One.
- 1997
  - March – ITV takes over as the broadcaster of Formula One motor racing. It shows full coverage of qualifying as well as the race itself, something that the BBC generally did not do. ITV also obtains the FA Cup and England International football highlights rights from the BBC at around the same time, resulting in the return of the FA Cup to ITV screens for the first time since 1988, although the BBC retains highlights of the FA Cup.
  - 21 March – The final edition of Sport on Friday is broadcast, the programme ending after a decade on air.
  - 9 April – The BBC broadcasts greyhound racing's TV Trophy for the final time.
  - 14 May – After nearly 30 years on air, the final edition of Sportsnight is shown on BBC1.
- 1998
  - 25 January – Sunday Grandstand becomes a year-round programme. Previously it had only broadcast between May and September.
  - February – For the first time, the BBC does not show England's matches in the Five Nations Championships. Live coverage is provided by Sky Sports with highlights on ITV.
  - 22 September – The final edition of cricket magazine Gower's Cricket Monthly is broadcast following the announcement that the BBC has lost the rights to show English cricket to Channel 4 with the final domestic live action being shown on the BBC at around this time.
- 1999
  - 2 April – Following Britain's elevation to the World group of the Davis Cup, the BBC starts showing full live coverage of Britain's matches in the tournament. Previously, the BBC had only shown Britain's ties as brief highlights, and on an ad-hoc basis.
  - May – Domestic athletics returns to the BBC after more than a decade.
  - 20 June – The BBC broadcasts live cricket for the final time for more than 20 years when it shows live coverage of the 1999 Cricket World Cup Final, bringing to an end of sixty years of continuous cricket coverage on the BBC.

== 2000s ==
- 2000
  - 20 May – Due to the loss of many major sports rights in recent years, the BBC does not broadcast this week's edition of Grandstand – ITV was showing the FA Cup Final. Apart from when Christmas Day fell on a Saturday or a major national event taking place, this had been the first time that Grandstand had not been broadcast on a Saturday afternoon since the programme's inception in 1958.
  - 15 June – The latest contracts for football's Premier League are announced which reveals that ITV has won the rights to the highlights package from the BBC at a reported cost of £183 million.
  - 18 November – After six years on air, the final edition of Sportscene Rugby Union is broadcast. The programme ends due to the BBC losing the rights to Scottish rugby to ITV.
  - BBC Sport Online launches.
- 2001
  - 22 April – The BBC makes a return to showing professional time boxing when it shows the Lennox Lewis vs. Hasim Rahman fight. The BBC continues to show fights on an ad-hoc basis for the next couple of years before deciding just to show boxing in multi-sport events such as the Olympic Games and Commonwealth Games.
  - 9 June – For the first time since 1979, the BBC shows The Derby as the contract for Epsom had previously been held by ITV and later Channel 4.
  - 11 August – Football Focus and Final Score become programmes in their own right. Previously both had been a segment within Grandstand.
  - September – The rights to the FA Cup and the England football team return to the BBC with the Corporation showing live coverage of the national team outside of the World Cup or European Championships for the first time in a decade.
- 2002
  - February – The BBC once again holds the rights to the entire Six Nations Championship.
  - August – BBC Scotland begins showing live Scottish Premier League matches. The deal also sees the Old Firm matches shown across all of the UK.
- 2003
  - The BBC wins the rights to the MotoGP World Championship. Previously, the corporation had only covered the British leg of the championships.
  - 24 May – The BBC's coverage of the Heineken Cup ends. It had shown rugby union's European clubs tournament since the late 1990s.
- 2004
  - May – BBC Scotland's two seasons of showing live Scottish Premier League ends after the rights are sold to Irish broadcaster Setanta Sports.
  - 14 August – To coincide with the BBC regaining rights to highlights of the Premier League, BBC Sport launches an afternoon-long football scores service Score Interactive. The programme is broadcast from 14:30 until 18:00 on the BBC's interactive service, the BBC Red Button. The BBC had operated an in-vision scores service on Saturday afternoon the previous season.
  - 15 August – Match of the Day 2 launches on BBC Two to show highlights of Sunday Premier League matches.
  - 26 November – It is announced that the BBC has lost the rights to The Boat Race to ITV. It had covered the event since 1938.
- 2005
  - 4 March – The BBC ends its brief return to live professional boxing when it shows Clinton Woods winning the IBF light-heavyweight title.
  - After nearly 40 years on air, Rugby Special ends although it does return on an ad hoc basis a decade later.
- 2006
  - 1–5 August – The BBC shows Glorious Goodwood for the final time, having covered the event for the previous 50 years. This is the latest horse-racing event the BBC loses to Channel 4.
  - The BBC broadcasts cricket for the first time in more than seven years when it shows highlights of the 2006-07 Ashes series.
- 2007
  - The BBC shows coverage of the NFL for the first time.
  - 28 January – The final edition of Grandstand is broadcast after nearly 49 years on air.
  - 13 March-28 April – The BBC broadcasts highlights of the 2007 ICC Cricket World Cup. The BBC also shows highlights of the 2011 event.
  - May – The BBC Trust approves plans for several BBC departments, including BBC Sport, to be moved to a new development in Salford.
- 2008
  - The BBC loses the rights to broadcast FA Cup and England football team matches to ITV. Consequently, the BBC has no rights to any form of coverage of the FA Cup for the first time in seven decades.
  - 6–17 September – The BBC shows the Summer Paralympic Games for the final time. The corporation had only shown the event in very limited form, usually just a single programme, but in the 2000s it had increased its coverage and in 2008 the BBC broadcasts daily live coverage for the first time although most live coverage is restricted to its Red Button service. From 2012, the event is shown on Channel 4.
- 2009
  - 29 March – Grand Prix returns to the BBC after twelve seasons on ITV.
  - Live coverage of the Football League returns to British terrestrial television when the BBC secures ten live Championship (second tier) games per season, as well as Football League highlights after Match of the Day. This is the first time that the BBC held the rights to the second tier - they had been with ITV since 1992.
  - December – The BBC broadcasts tennis' end of year ATP Finals for the first time.

== 2010s ==
- 2010
  - 18 January – The BBC launches a regional football show to supplement its coverage of the Football League. Called Late Kick Off, the programmes follows a magazine-style format.
  - 3 April – The BBC once again becomes the broadcaster of The Boat Race.
- 2011
  - 8 January – The BBC launches a children's football magazine show Match of the Day Kickabout.
  - 28 October – The BBC loses the rights to tennis' French Open to ITV, The corporation had shown the event, albeit in very limited form, for many decades. ITV will show full live coverage, mainly on ITV4, as opposed to the partial coverage shown by the previous rights holder, the BBC.
  - The BBC also loses the rights to the World Athletics Championships to Channel 4. Initially Channel 4 bought the rights to the 2011 and 2013 events but due to poor reception of Channel 4's coverage, and the broadcaster's decision to focus on Paralympic Sports, the BBC won back the rights to the 2013 event.
- 2012
  - 5 March – BBC Sport starts broadcasting bulletins from MediaCityUK in Salford.
  - 27 July-12 August – The 2012 Summer Olympics take place, and with the exception of news programming, BBC One is devoted entirely to live coverage of the Games. Also, live coverage of every sport is shown via its interactive and online service meaning that viewers are able to watch every sport live and in full for the very first time. However, the BBC does not show the 2012 Paralympic Games, which are broadcast on Channel 4.
  - August – Match of the Day 2 moves to BBC One.
  - 27 December – BBC Sport shows horse racing for the final time ahead of Channel 4 taking over as broadcaster of all terrestrial horse racing from the start of 2013. The BBC had scaled back its horse racing in recent years, gradually losing more and more events to Channel 4.
  - The BBC loses the rights to live coverage of the Scottish Open, and BMW PGA Championship to Sky Sports. The BBC does retain the rights to show highlights of both events.
- 2013
  - After a decade of coverage, the BBC shows the MotoGP World Championship for the final time as coverage of the event moves to the recently launched BT Sport.
  - BBC Two broadcasts four programmes covering the FA Women's Super League.
- 2014
  - After five years without any FA Cup coverage, the BBC regains the rights to the FA Cup, which it shares with BT Sport.
- 2015
  - 25 May – The Football League Show and Late Kick Off end after six seasons due to the BBC losing the rights to Football League highlights to Channel 5.
  - June – The BBC's Wimbledon Tennis Championships highlights programme changes format and name, to Wimbledon 2day, with a new light-hearted magazine format, but after only one year, the format was abandoned for 2016.
  - July – The BBC and ITV join forces to stop Sky Sports from picking up live coverage of the Six Nations Championship. The two terrestrial broadcasts will share coverage of the event from 2017 onwards.
  - 17–20 July – After 60 years, the BBC shows live coverage of The Open Championship for the final time as from next year, live coverage of the event transfers to Sky Sports although the BBC does continue to show two hours of highlights each day.
  - 21 December – Budget cuts result in the BBC deciding to end its coverage of Grand Prix. The rights transfer to Channel 4.
- 2016
  - 2–10 January – The BBC shows the BDO World Darts Championship for the final time as a month later the BBC announces a deal to show the inaugural PDC Champions League of Darts.
  - February – The British Basketball League signs a two-year broadcast deal with the BBC, featuring both British Basketball League and Women's British Basketball League games. The games are to be mostly broadcast on the BBC Sport website with the showpiece finals also being broadcast on the BBC Red Button.
  - 28–31 July – The BBC broadcasts live coverage of the Women's British Open for the final time. However it continues to broadcast highlights of the event following the passing of live coverage to Sky Sports.
  - 25 August – The BBC launches a new Premier League magazine show called The Premier League Show.
- 2017
  - February – The BBC and ITV begin a five-year contract as joint broadcasters of the Six Nations Championship. They had joined forces to keep the event on free-to-air television.
  - September – The BBC begins showing regular live coverage of the FA Women's Super League with a weekly game shown live on the BBC Red Button.
  - 3 November – The BBC announces that it has signed deals with a number of different sports to bring 1,000 extra hours of live sports coverage each year. The increase in free-to-air sport will be seen through the BBC Sport website and BBC iPlayer and includes the early rounds of the FA Cup, more matches from Wimbledon and women's football Super League fixtures as well as coverage of the entire Rugby League Challenge Cup. Olympic sports including hockey, swimming and basketball, are also expected to receive more coverage.
- 2018
  - The BBC's coverage of the PRO14 Rugby ends when the rights are sold to Premier Sports. The BBC had covered the competition since its inception in 2001.
  - June – The BBC airs all of its matches from the 2018 World Cup in 4K UHD and VR to a limited number of viewers. This is the first BBC Sport broadcast in 4K HD.
  - 2–12 August – The BBC shows live coverage of the inaugural European Championships (multi-sport event).
  - 15 December – The BBC begins its coverage of Formula E and shows most of the races on the BBC Red Button.
- 2019
  - 12–13 April – The BBC shows live coverage of The Masters golf event for the final time, showing live coverage of the final two rounds. Coverage of the entire event - the BBC had shared coverage since 2011 - moves to Sky Sports. This ends all live coverage of golf on the BBC.
  - 9 May – The final edition of The Premier League Show is broadcast.
  - 29 June – The BBC shows live Major League Baseball for the first time when it screens the inaugural MLB London Series.
  - 26 October-16 November – BBC Sport broadcasts live coverage of rugby league's British Lions tour to New Zealand.
  - November – The BBC loses the rights to Britain's Davis Cup tennis matches to Eurosport, having held them since the late 1990s.

== 2020s ==
- 2020
  - June – With the resumption of play in the 2019–20 Premier League due to the COVID-19 pandemic in the United Kingdom, the Premier League announces that it will show all remaining matches on British television, split primarily across Sky, BT, and Amazon, with four matches shown on the BBC. It is the first time in 32 years that the BBC has shown live coverage of top flight English football.
  - July – Regular coverage of cricket returns to the BBC when it succeeds Channel 5 as the broadcaster of highlights of English cricket.
  - 19 August – The BBC broadcasts the World Seniors Snooker Championship for the first time after the World Snooker Championship tournament had finished.
  - 20 August – The BBC shows live cricket for the first time in more than 21 years.
  - 8 September – It is announced that all of September's Premier League fixtures will be shown on TV with more matches held behind closed doors at stadiums due to the COVID-19 pandemic, with one game shown on BBC One. The BBC shows an additional game in December after the Premier League confirms that the broadcasting of matches that all games in December and January will be shown on television.
- 2021
  - January – BBC Sport shows South American football for the first time when it broadcasts the semi-finals and final of the 2020 Copa Libertadores.
  - 3–24 April – The BBC is the exclusive broadcaster of the 2021 Women's Six Nations Championship. Previously the tournament had been shared between the BBC, and Sky Sports which had shown the England matches.
  - 13 May – The Premier League announces that, for the first time, the next three-year broadcasting contract has been awarded without a bidding process. Consequently, BBC Sport's contract is renewed for the same cost.
  - 23 May – Live coverage of the Diamond League returns to the BBC following an agreement which will see the athletics series broadcast live on the BBC for the next four years.
  - 13 June–10 July – The BBC shows 2021 Copa America.Copa America 2021: Every match live on BBC Sport This is the first time that the tournament has been shown on free-to-air television.
- 2022
  - 9 January – 6 February – The BBC shares coverage of the African Cup of Nations with Sky Sports. The BBC shows two quarter-finals, both semi-finals and the final live.
  - 4 June – The BBC broadcasts live professional boxing for the first time since 2005 when BBC Wales and BBC iPlayer shows two Welsh title fights.
  - 27 June – For the first time since 1983, the BBC schedules live evening coverage of Wimbledon on BBC One to try to reduce the disruption caused to the BBC's schedules due to last moment decisions to transfer live coverage from BBC Two to BBC One.
  - 28 July to 8 August – The BBC shows the Commonwealth Games for what was to be the final time as coverage of the 2026 event is on TNT Sports, with daily highlights on Channel 5.
  - 22 September – Major League Baseball returns to BBC screens as part of a new deal to show the MLB London Series. The new deal also gives the BBC rights to show games played in America for the first time.
  - 15 October–19 November – The BBC broadcasts live coverage of all 61 games from the men’s, women’s and wheelchair tournaments of the 2021 Rugby League World Cup.. This was to be the final Rugby League World Cup to be televised by the BBC as Premier Sports takes over the broadcasting rights from 2026.
  - 25 October – The BBC announces that it has signed a five-year deal with the Gaelic Athletic Association to broadcast The All-Ireland senior football and hurling finals.
- 2023
  - 29 March – The BBC shows the first of nine basketball games from the final stages of the 2022–23 NBA season. The Corporation broadcasts six regular season games, two play-off games, one Conference Finals game and one NBA Finals game plus selected highlights and an end-of-season review show.
- 2024
  - 17 February – The BBC shows a live Super League rugby league match for the first time when it broadcasts the first of 15 Super League games that the BBC will show for the next three seasons.
- 2025
  - The BBC shows The Boat Race for the final time. With the exception of the late 2000s and 2020, the BBC had covered the event since 1938. The coverage moves to Channel 4 from the following year.
  - 8 August – It is announced that BOXXER has signed a deal with BBC Sport.
  - 29 November – The BBC's deal with BOXXER begins on this day, and this is the first time in more than 20 years that the BBC has shown professional boxing.
- 2026
  - 1 February – What turns out to be the final edition of Ski Sunday is broadcast because in September 2026 the BBC announces that the programme will not return, ending 48 years of Sunday teatime winter sports highlights on BBC Two. BBC announced that the programme was to finish after nearly 50 years on air.
  - The BBC brings Italian football to its screens for viewers in Scotland after the BBC signs up Serie A for viewing on its Gaelic language channel. It shows eight matches towards the end of the 2025/26 season. The Corporation adds to this for the 2026/27 season and shows one live game per round - nineteen games on BBC iPlayer and nineteen on BBC Alba.
  - 24 May – Football Focus ends after 52 years. The final edition is shown at the end of the 2025–26 football season.
  - 15 August – Final Score's airtime on BBC One is expanded, now staring each week at 3.45pm, instead of 4.30pm. The programme now airs on BBC One Scotland as BBC Scotland's bespoke results coverage does not return for the 2026/27 season.

== See also ==
- Timeline of ITV Sport
- Timeline of sport on Channel 4
- Timeline of sport on Channel 5
