= Sport on Friday =

BBC television sports programme

- Genre: Sport
- Presented by: David Icke; Helen Rollason
- Theme music composer: David Reilly; John Devereaux
- Opening theme: "Hitting Home"
- Country of origin: United Kingdom
- Original language: English

Production
- Running time: 95-195 minutes
- Production company: BBC Sport

Original release
- Network: BBC Two
- Release: 9 October 1987 – 21 March 1997

Related
- Sports Afternoon (1986–1987)

Sport on Friday is a BBC television sports programme that ran from 9 October 1987 until 21 March 1997. It was broadcast between October and April and was a companion show to both Sportsnight and Grandstand.

The programme began the previous year as Sports Afternoon and was part of the BBC's newly launched daytime service. Sports Afternoon was broadcast on Wednesday afternoons between 2.35pm and 3.50pm, and from 10 December there was a three-minute newsbreak at 3pm, although if there was coverage of a horse race which started at 3pm, the newsbreak would occur slightly before, or slightly after, 3pm.

For the following year, the programme was renamed as Sport on Friday to reflect its move to a Friday afternoon slot, with a slightly extended running time, beginning at either 2.15pm or 2.20pm and running until 3.50pm with a three-minute newsbreak at 3pm, although the programme was sometimes extended until as late as 5.30pm when it was showing extensive live coverage, and on those occasions there was a further seven-minute newsbreak at 3.50pm.

Its main live coverage was of snooker, golf, bowls, horse racing and tennis, although other live coverage would be featured as and when applicable, such as the draw for UEFA Euro 1992. When not showing live sport the programme would consist of highlights of recent sporting events, such as cricket, notably with highlights of an England overseas tour, darts (during the Embassy World Championship in January), ski-ing and ice skating, as well as features and previews of the forthcoming weekend's sporting action. Formula 1 would feature in the sports news section in the form of a short report from Murray Walker on the Friday qualifying sessions.

The programme was initially presented by David Icke, until he was replaced by Helen Rollason in 1990.

== Regular hosts ==
- David Icke (1986-1990)
- Helen Rollason (1990–1997)
