= Bike (TV channel) =

- Country: Italy
- Broadcast area: Italy; United Kingdom

Programming
- Languages: Italian; English
- Picture format: 16:9 576i (SDTV)

Ownership
- Owner: Filmedia; Bike Media UK Ltd.

History
- Launched: 12 February 2013 (Italy); 10 December 2015 (United Kingdom)

Bike was a specialist sport television channel broadcasting on Sky Italia in Italy and Sky and Virgin in the United Kingdom.

Bike Channel ceased airing in September 2017.

== History ==
The channel launched in Italy on 12 February 2013 on Sky Italia. After its successful launch in Italy, the channel began broadcasting in the United Kingdom on 10 December 2015.

In December 2016 it was announced that the channel would sponsor the new Bike Channel–Canyon cycling team for the 2017 season, with the channel broadcasting documentaries and "behind-the-scenes" content about the team.

== Programming ==
=== Magazine programmes and highlights ===
- Bicycle Diaries
- Bike at Mount Ventoux
- Footprints on the Ridge
- Italian Masters
- Incycle
- Freewheels
- Milan–San Remo road cycling
- Triathlon
- Il Lombardia
- The Book of Cross
- Cycling with Filippa
- UCI BMX Racing

=== Live coverage ===
The announcement of the channel's UK launch included details of the races the station would cover live, which included the Tour de Suisse, the Tour de Romandie and Gent–Wevelgem. Other races broadcast on the channel include Dwars door Vlaanderen, the Vuelta a Burgos, the Tour of Utah, the Giro del Trentino, Brabantse Pijl, Scheldeprijs, Omloop Het Nieuwsblad, the Tour des Fjords and the Brussels Cycling Classic. In July 2016 it was announced that BIKE would air live coverage of the 2016 Tour of Britain that September.
