= Timeline of ITV Sport =

This is a timeline of the history of ITV Sport, provider of sports coverage for the British ITV network and ITV Digital Channels.

== 1950s and 1960s ==
- 1955
  - 22 September – ITV is launched and sport - boxing - is part of the launch night's programmes.
  - 12 October - ITV shows live football for the first time. They cover the second half of a floodlit friendly between Tottenham Hotspur and Vasas Budapest from White Hart Lane, although the foggy weather may have affected the broadcast.
  - 26 October - For the first time, a match in European competition is televised. ITV shows the second half of the Inter-Cities’ Fairs Cup tie between London and Frankfurt. This is also the first floodlit match at Wembley Stadium. The European Cup begins this season, though there is no television coverage of Scotland’s entrant Hibernian. England is not represented in the inaugural competition.
  - 9 November - Wrestling debuts on ITV, with Kent Walton commentating, from West Ham Baths.
  - 30 November - ITV shows a home England international live from Wembley for the first time when Associated Rediffusion broadcasts their 4-1 victory over Spain, with Kent Walton commentating.
  - October–November – ITV creates a rugby league tournament called the Independent Television Floodlit Trophy. Played under floodlights at various London football grounds, the tournament was shown live in the London area only because ITV had not launched in the sport's north of England heartlands. The second half of the matches are shown live. The competition was a one-off and did not return the following year.
- 1956
  - 12 January - ITV broadcasts its first coverage of the FA Cup when it shows live the second half Third Round replay between non-league Bedford Town and Arsenal. The network covers two further replays that season.
  - 17 March - ITV company ABC televises recorded highlights (on film) of the FA Cup Semi-Final between Birmingham City and Sunderland, the network’s first ever highlights programme.
  - 5 May - The FA Cup Final is broadcast live simultaneously on BBC TV and ITV for the first time. ITV’s main commentator Peter Lloyd becomes the only broadcaster to commentate on the final for both BBC and ITV, having covered the 1949 and 1950 finals for BBC TV. England captain Billy Wright and former Manchester City and England goalkeeper Frank Swift join him in the commentary box for ITV’s first Cup Final broadcast.
  - June – ITV's coverage of the The Wimbledon Tennis Championships debuts to complete with the BBC's coverage.
- 1957
  - 25 April - A European Cup tie featuring a British side is televised live for the first time, on ITV. The second leg of the Manchester United v Real Madrid semi-final is broadcast from Old Trafford. The network takes coverage of the second half, but in the Granada region (covering the north of England) the whole match was shown with Gerry Loftus and Frank Swift commentating.
  - 4 May - ITV declines the opportunity to cover the FA Cup Final.
  - 18 September - Scotsport launches on Scottish Television, although the programme was initially called Sports Desk.
  - 14 December - Scottish Television shows a club football match for the first time. Three days after the game was played, a ten minute film of Rangers’ European Cup tie away to AC Milan is broadcast on the Sports Desk programme.
- 1958
  - 8–29 June – The 1958 FIFA World Cup is covered live by BBC Television and, for the first time, by ITV. Ten live matches are made available via Eurovision. All were shown by the BBC, while seven were taken by the commercial network.
  - 13–19 July – ITV shows coverage of the Commonwealth Games. This is the only time that ITV has covered the event to compete with the BBC's coverage.
  - 9 September - Scottish Television broadcasts live football for the first time. The European Cup Preliminary Round tie between Hearts and Standard Liège is also ITV’s first contribution to the Eurovision network.
- 1960
  - ITV agrees a deal worth £150,000 with the Football League to screen 26 matches; the very first live league match was on Saturday 10 September 1960 between Blackpool and Bolton Wanderers at Bloomfield Road. The match kicked off at 6:50 pm with live coverage starting at 7:30 under the title The Big Game. The game is played in front of a half-empty stadium. TV withdraws from the deal after first Arsenal and then Tottenham Hotspur refused them permission to shoot at their matches against Newcastle United and Aston Villa respectively, and the Football League demanded a dramatic increase in player appearance payments.
  - 1 June – ITV and the BBC both show The Derby because it was a protected event which could not be exclusive to either channel. However, the rest of the Epsom events, including The Oaks, are broadcast exclusively on ITV.
- 1962
  - 26 August - Tyne Tees Television becomes the first ITV regional company to broadcast weekly Football League highlights. Their programme Shoot showed filmed excerpts of matches in the north-east of England
  - 30 September – ITV company Anglia Television launches Match of the Week, which shows highlights of matches from around East Anglia. It is often written that the first match shown was Ipswich Town's 3–2 defeat at the hands of Wolves at Portman Road on 22 September 1962.However, this was a pilot programme and was not transmitted. The first edition was shown a week later, featuring Norwich City’s match with Derby County. Anglia’s debut programme, directed by Bob Gardam, was a pioneering one. This was the first time an edited football match, recorded on videotape, had been shown on television anywhere in the world.
- 1963
  - ITV shows cricket for the first time, focussing initially on a new one-day event The Gillette Cup.
- 1965
  - 2 January – The first edition of World of Sport is broadcast. The new programme incorporates ITV's coverage of wrestling, usually shown at 4pm as a weekly feature throughout the programme's run. although a midweek late evening slot would also continue until 1976. Another regular feature would be horse racing.
- 1966
  - The BBC and ITV share the rights to England's home cricket test matches. This arrangement continues until 1968, after which the full rights transfer back to the BBC.
  - 11–30 July – The BBC and ITV are joint host broadcasters of the 1966 World Cup. ITV crews supply the pictures seen worldwide from Old Trafford, Villa Park, White City and Roker Park.
- 1968
  - 24 June-6 July – The Wimbledon Championships are shown on ITV for the final time.
  - ITV launches On the Ball, a lunchtime preview of the day's football fixtures. It is shown as a segment within World of Sport.
  - 25 August – The first edition of The Big Match is broadcast. Originally shown primarily by London Weekend Television, the programme would eventually becomes the brand for all of ITV's domestic football coverage in the 1980s.
  - 12–27 October – ITV shows the Olympic Games for the first time.
- 1969
  - 6 September – After six years, ITV decides to stop showing cricket on a national basis. Some county games are occasionally shown on a regional basis for the next 25 years.
  - 14 October – The first ITV Seven takes place, under the title of They’re Off!. The required number of races was obtained by televising races at two courses each week.

== 1970s ==
- 1970
  - 2–7 July – ITV shows a home England Cricket Test Match for the final time - the 2nd Test v The Rest of the World at Trent Bridge. This is due to the BBC being committed to Wimbledon.
  - 13 November – The Colour Strike begins when ITV staff refuse to work with colour television equipment following a dispute over pay with its management.
- 1971
  - 3 February – After nearly three months, the ITV Colour Strike ends and programmes, including sports coverage, resume being made in colour.
- 1972
  - 14–18 June - ITV covers the finals of the UEFA European Championship for the first time.
  - ITV shows darts on a national basis for the first time as part of its World of Sport programme when it shows coverage of that year's News of the World Darts Championship.
- 1973
  - 20–22 September - ITV shows the Ryder Cup for the first time.
- 1974
  - 31 August – ITV shows the first edition of the World Masters (darts). It continues to show the event until it drops darts in 1988.
- 1975
  - 4 June – ITV becomes the exclusive broadcaster of The Derby - the race had been shown by both ITV and the BBC since 1960.
- 1976
  - 2 June - ITV is the exclusive broadcaster of The Derby for the second year in a row - The BBC had opted not to show the 1975 and 1976 Epsom Derbies due to budget cuts.
- 1977
  - 23 June - Scottish Television and Grampian Television show overnight live coverage of the Brazil v Scotland friendly live from Rio de Janeiro from 12:45am–3:00am in the early hours of Friday 24 June.
- 1978
  - 7 June - ITV is, once again, the exclusive broadcaster of The Derby as the BBC turned down the opportunity to show the race jointly with ITV.
  - London Weekend Television wins exclusive rights to all league football coverage for ITV in a move termed "Snatch of the Day". Although the Office of Fair Trading blocked the move, the BBC is forced to allow ITV to take over the Saturday night slot in alternating seasons, beginning with the 1980-81 season.
  - 30 August - The first edition of Midweek Sports Special is broadcast.
- 1979
  - 10 August – No ITV programmes are broadcast for eleven successive weeks owing to a technicians' strike.

== 1980s ==
- 1980
  - 4 June – ITV again takes over as the exclusive broadcaster of The Derby - the BBC had also shown the 1977 and 1979 races.
- 1981
  - 2–8 March - ITV starts showing Snooker on a national basis with daily live and recorded coverage of the Yamaha Organs Trophy followed later in the year with the first Jameson International. From 1982 the Classic would get full daily national coverage and in 1983 a new tournament would be added to the schedule the World Doubles Championship replaced in 1988 with the World Matchplay which would give ITV four tournaments a year. Snooker on ITV before this was shown on a regional and semi networked basis with regionally televised tournaments and semi networked pro celebrity tournaments, all of which were pre-recorded.
- 1982
  - 2 November - Channel 4 launches and ITV uses Channel 4 for extended coverage of sporting events.
- 1983
  - 14 May – Regional coverage of football outside of Scotland on ITV ends, as, from the following season, LWT's The Big Match will become ITV's national football programme, with Scotsport continuing to air in Scotland.
  - 21 May – ITV shows the FA Cup Final live under World Of Sport as usual but drops the networked Friday night preview and highlights shows although Granada and TVS (the regions of the 2 finalists Manchester United and Brighton) do show FA Cup Final Preview (The former under their usual Kick Off programme and the latter as Coast to Coast's Friday Sports preview slot Friday Sportshow) and highlights programmes. (Match Time/The Saturday Match and Sunday Sportsclub which was originally due to show live coverage of Brighton's homecoming).
  - 7–14 August – ITV (and the BBC) show the first World Athletics Championships with highlights on Channel 4.
  - 2 October – ITV shows a live top flight football match for the first time since 1960. This marks the start of English football being shown on a national basis rather than on a regional basis, resulting in The Big Match becoming a fully national programme.
- 1984
  - 29 January - ITV televises live the FA Cup Fourth Round match between Brighton and Liverpool. The network had not shown a live match other than the final for 28 years, since a Sixth Round Replay between West Ham United and Tottenham Hotspur in 1956.
  - 22 March - Midweek Racing switches to Channel 4. However Racing would continue to be shown on ITV on Saturdays on World Of Sport and on Bank Holiday Mondays on Bank Holiday Sports Special until just before the end of World of Sport in September 1985.
  - 9 June - ITV shows Rugby League nationally for the first time in 14 years when it shows highlights of the 1984 Great Britain Lions tour on World of Sport.
  - ITV obtains the rights to show boxing fights promoted by Frank Warren's Sports Network and later in the decade ITV signs a deal to with Barry Hearn. This deal marks ITV's first major step into covering British boxing as previously most of ITV's coverage had been the big fights from the USA. ITV launches a new programme to cover the sport - The Big Fight Live. ITV also introduces 2 supplementary programmes Fight Night (on Granada, Yorkshire, Central, STV, Grampian Television, Border TV, Tyne Tees Television, UTV) and Seconds Out (on Thames Television, HTV Wales, HTV West, Anglia, TVS, TSW, Channel Television). Both show midweek recorded coverage of non-premium boxing action and some of these fights are nationally screened on Midweek Sports Special and even on World of Sport.
  - 8 December - The LWT, Granada and Ulster regions show live overnight coverage of the 1984 Intercontinental Cup match Liverpool v Independiente from Tokyo in the early hours of 9 December.
- 1985
  - ITV takes over as broadcaster of UK athletics meetings (split with Channel 4). It also begins to cover European meetings in addition to the major international events.
  - 28 September – The final edition of World of Sport is broadcast.
  - 5 October – ITV launches a new Saturday afternoon schedule which sees the football preview show becoming a programme in its own right, called Saint & Greavsie, a two-hour live transmission of a single sporting event and a results programme called Results Service. Wrestling also continues to be shown, moving to a lunchtime slot. Racing makes its Saturday afternoon debut on Channel 4, completing racing's move from ITV to Channel 4.
- 1986
  - 22 November – Two ITV regions - Central and Granada - stay on the air overnight to show a boxing match live from the USA for the first time when they broadcast live coverage of the WBC Heavyweight Championship of the World match between Trevor Berbick and Mike Tyson. All other regions show recorded coverage at 9:30am on 23 November.
- 1987
  - 28 August-6 September – ITV shows the World Athletics Championships for the second and final time. Some of the coverage of broadcast on Channel 4.
- 1988
  - February–March – ITV shows highlights of England's tour to New Zealand. This is the first time for two decades that cricket has been shown nationally on ITV.
  - 14 May – The FA Cup Final is shown live on both the BBC and ITV. This is the last such occasion for 34 years, ITV would not cover the competition again until 1997.
  - 1 June – ITV ends its association with horse racing for the next three decades when it simulcasts Channel 4's coverage of The Derby for the final time.
  - 17 September–2 October – ITV broadcasts the Olympic Games for the final time, sharing the coverage with Channel 4 which shows the overnight and breakfast coverage of the 1988 Olympic Games. ITV shows the daytime coverage.
  - October – ITV announces that it will stop showing darts and that the final event that it will show will be the forthcoming World Masters.
  - 30 October – Following the signing of a new four-year deal for exclusive coverage of the Football League, ITV shows the first of its allotted eighteen live First Division matches, Everton v Manchester United.
  - December – Following a change in direction at ITV, ITV decides to stop showing wrestling, having done so each week since the 1950s. It will later screen American wrestling promotion WCW in the traditional Saturday afternoon timeslot in most ITV regions between 1992 and 1995 (with some regions having screened various American promotions in the interim in assorted graveyard slots.) Grampian and STV also both briefly revive British wrestling in 1990 (Walton's last commentary work) and again in 1993. Late 2010s series World of Sport Wrestling was promoted as being a reboot of the wrestling segment of the original UK television series
- 1989
  - 8–10 September – ITV covers the IAAF World Cup for the final time (this time jointly with Channel 4).

== 1990s ==
- 1990
  - 27 August-2 September – ITV broadcasts a major athletics championships for the final time when it broadcasts the 1990 European Athletics Championships. Coverage is restricted to a late-evening highlights package although ITV does show the final day's events live.
  - September - Granada drops Midweek Sports Special after 12 years for their own Granada Soccer Night programme following complaints from Granada's head of sport Paul Doherty about both the networked coverage of Oldham Athletic's Littlewoods Cup run and lack of coverage of the 2nd Round tie between Liverpool and Wigan Athletic in the same competition the previous season. Central also drops Midweek Sports Special for their own show Central Sports Special at the same time.
- 1991
  - May – Midweek Sports Special ends after 13 years when all the English regions, HTV Wales and Ulster TV all opt out for their own midweek sports shows. The programme continues in London as Thames Sports Special. STV and Grampian were already opting out of Midweek Sports Special with Midweek Scotsport.
  - 3 October–2 November – ITV shows full live coverage of the 1991 Rugby World Cup, beginning a relationship with the tournament which lasts to this day.
- 1992
  - 18 May – Sky outbids ITV for the live rights to the newly formed football Premier League. Sky bids £304 million, as opposed to ITV's £262 million.
  - Following the loss of the rights to top flight football, ITV decides to drop its preview show Saint & Greavsie and its results programme Results Service which, from August, is integrated into an extended 25 minute teatime ITN News bulletin - ITN Saturday Early Evening News and Sport - which would start at 4:40pm. It includes the classified football results and pools news as well as a news round up of the afternoon sport, after which the regional companies would show their Goals Extra/Regional Sports Round ups after their Saturday teatime regional news bulletins.
  - August – ITV maintains their partnership with the Football League and begins showing matches from the second tier of English football. The coverage is shown on a regional basis with many English regions showing a live game on a Sunday afternoon.
  - 2 September - UEFA announce that ITV have secured an exclusive contract to show the UEFA Champions League. The deal covers matches from the group stage onwards. The first live match, Rangers v Marseille on 25 November is only screened by seven regions.
- 1993
  - 6 March – ITV ends its coverage of snooker after its broadcast of that year's British Open. It had previously shown around four events each year.
  - 16–18 April – Following its successful broadcasting of the 1991 Rugby World Cup, ITV steps up its coverage of international rugby union when it broadcasts full live coverage of the first 1993 Rugby World Cup Sevens.
  - 12 June-3 July – ITV shows live coverage of the three test matches of the 1993 British Lions tour to New Zealand. This is the only time that ITV has covered the British and Irish Lions with previous coverage being on the BBC and from 1997 the tour is shown on Sky Sports.
  - September – ITV begins displaying a score bug, a digital on-screen graphic displaying the current score.
- 1994
  - 11 May-11 June – ITV shows live coverage of the 1994 England rugby union tour of South Africa. In addition to showing the two test matches, ITV also broadcasts live coverage of all the tour matches. ITV also broadcast highlights of the other home countries' tour matches taking place in 1994. It shows all of the tour matches live. This is the only time that ITV broadcasts an English rugby tour as from 1996 Sky Sports would cover the Summer rugby tours by England and the other nations Scotland, Wales and Ireland as part of a TV deal with SANZAR.
  - 17 June–17 July – ITV and the BBC opt to only show live coverage of selected matches from the group stage of the 1994 World Cup and it is only the knock-out stages of the tournament that are shown live and in full by the terrestrial broadcasters.
  - mid 1994 – ITV loses the rights to Sky Sports of boxing fights promoted by Barry Hearn.
  - ITV launches a new weekly national programme called Football League Extra to show highlights from the Football League.
- 1995
  - April – ITV loses rights to Frank Warren's Sports Network fights to Sky Sports.
  - October – ITV resumes its coverage of boxing, albeit for lower profile fights.
  - 30 December and 6 January 1996 – ITV broadcasts live coverage of semi-finals and final of the inaugural Heineken Cup.
- 1996
  - Sky Sports gains the rights to live coverage of the Football League from ITV.
  - ITV shows athletics coverage for the final time. It had slowly been reducing its coverage of the sport since the start of the 1990s. The rights pass to Channel 4 before returning to the BBC in 1999.
- 1997
  - March – ITV takes over as the broadcaster of Formula One motor racing. It shows full coverage of qualifying as well as the race itself, something that the previous rights holder, the BBC, generally did not do.
  - ITV obtains the FA Cup and England International football highlights rights from the BBC resulting in the return of the FA Cup to ITV screens for the first time since 1988.
- 1998
  - February – ITV shows England's matches in the rugby union Five Nations Championships. Live coverage is on Sky Sports. This continues until 2001, after which the BBC regains the full rights to the tournament.
  - 5 September – ITV resurrects On the Ball, a lunchtime preview of the day's football fixtures. ITV also resurrects The Big Match as the title for its football coverage.
  - 12 December – ITV launches ITV2 and part of its schedule is for additional sports coverage. Among the output is a Saturday afternoon scores service called Football First. This is ITV's first results programme for six years.
- 1999
  - ITV makes a brief return to snooker when it televises the Champions Cup and the Nations Cup.
  - September – Champions on 28 and Champions on 99 launch to provide live and recorded coverage of the UEFA Champions League. The channels are only available to ONdigital customers.

== 2000s ==
- 2000
  - 15 June – The latest contracts for football’s Premier League are announced with the big news being that ITV has won the rights to the highlights package from the BBC at a reported cost of £183 million.
  - September – ONsport launches. It replaces Champions on 28 and Champions on 99, which had reflected the channel numbers these were broadcast on. These channels were re-branded respectively as ONsport 1 and ONsport 2, after ONdigital had purchased rights to the ATP Masters Series tennis. Whilst ONsport 1 broadcast 24 hours a day, ONsport 2 timeshared with Carlton Cinema and was only on air to provide coverage of an alternate Champions League match.
- 2001
  - 11 August – The ITV Sport Channel launches. It replaces ONsport. The new channel is mostly focussed on football and comes after ONdigital successfully outbid BSkyB for the rights to show live matches from The Football League and the League Cup, for a massive £315m over three seasons, at least five times more than any broadcaster had previously bid for it. Other output also includes ITV returning to broadcasting snooker.
  - 18 August –
    - ITV begins its coverage of the Premier League when it launches its highlights programme The Premiership. The programme is shown in a primetime slot, airing at 7pm as opposed to the 10.30pm slot previously used by the BBC. However ITV loses the rights to the rights to the FA Cup and the England football team return to the BBC with the Corporation showing live coverage of the national team for the first time in a decade.
    - ITV relaunches its live scores service from Football First to The Goal Rush.
  - 19 August – ITV's return to snooker ends after it shows the 2001 Champions Cup.
  - August – ITV launches ITV Select. It uses the channel to provide ITV Digital viewers with pay-per-view coverage of the Premier League, which Sky shows on its own channel PremPlus.
  - 17 November – Following disappointing viewing figures ITV ends its experiment with peak time Saturday night football and The Premiership reverts to the traditional 10.30pm slot.
- 2002
  - ITV takes over as broadcaster of the British Touring Car Championship. ITV shows live coverage as opposed to only highlights when the BBC had the contract.
  - 27 March – ITV Digital goes into administration with the cost of the Football League deal being the burden which used the company over the edge.
  - 12 May – Following the collapse of ITV Digital, the ITV Sports Channel stops broadcasting.
  - July – ITV shows live and recorded coverage of the Tour de France, taking over from Channel 4 which had broadcast the event since 1983. ITV had bought the rights for its now failed ITV Sport Channel which would have given the football-heavy channel something to show during the summer.
  - August – Coverage of the Football League reverts to Sky Sports.
- 2003
  - May – ITV decides to stop showing a football scores service resulting in the demise of The Goal Rush.
- 2004
  - 15 May – Following its loss of Premier League highlights, The Premiership is shown for the final time. Also, On the Ball is discontinued for the same reason.
  - August – ITV launches a new Sunday morning programme, The Championship to show highlights of the previous day's action from the Football League. It replaces Football League Extra, which had generally been shown late at night on Monday nights. Also, a new regional football highlights programme Soccer Night. The programme focuses on Football League clubs.
- 2005
  - January – ITV broadcasts American football for the first time when it shows the play-offs and the Super Bowl. ITV also broadcasts these events in 2006 and 2007 until the rights move to the BBC in 2008.
  - 27 March – ITV shows live coverage of The Boat Race for the first time as part of a new four-year deal. The event returns to the BBC in 2009.
  - Following a successful one-off return to boxing in May, ITV decides to return to the sport on a regular basis when it re-captures the rights to Frank Warren's Sports Network promotions.
  - 1 November – ITV moves its sports coverage from ITV2 to the newly launched ITV4.
- 2006
  - June – ITV launches a trial high-definition channel, primarily to show matches from the 2006 FIFA World Cup.
- 2007
  - 17–25 November – Having not shown darts since 1988, ITV resumes coverage of the sport when it shows the inaugural Grand Slam of Darts. It shows some of the event on the main ITV channel with the rest of the coverage shown on ITV4. ITV goes on to show the event until 2010.
- 2008
  - March – ITV announces that they have enacted a clause within their contract enabling them to leave Formula One coverage after the 2008 season. It is believed this was done for commercial reasons and to allow more money to be spent on securing coverage of the UEFA Champions League.
  - May – ITV's regional football highlights programme Soccer Night is axed as part of further cutbacks in ITV's regional output. The Welsh Soccer Sunday continued for a further six months with coverage of Cardiff City and Swansea City for the first half of the 2008/9 season but that programme was axed in December 2008. Goals from local Football League matches moved to ITV regional news programmes.
  - August – ITV regains the rights to the FA Cup and the England football team.
  - 6 September – ITV loses the rights to Frank Warren’s Sports Network to Sky but it does continue to broadcast boxing when it a signs a 2-year, 26-fight deal with Hennessy Sports.
  - September – ITV takes over as broadcaster of the highlights of Premiership rugby and the Anglo-Welsh Cup. Sky Sports and the BBC have the live rights respectively.
  - 30 October-2 November – Following the success of its broadcasting of the Grand Slam of Darts, ITV starts showing a new tournament, the European Championship and has shown every edition.
  - 2 November – ITV ends its twelve-year association with Formula One after ITV enacted a clause within its contract enabling them to leave F1 coverage after the 2008 season. It is believed this was done for commercial reasons and to allow more money to be spent on securing coverage of the UEFA Champions League. The rights revert back to the BBC.
- 2009
  - ITV’s coverage of The Boat Race ends after five years covering the event.
  - May – Following ITV’s loss of the rights to highlights of the Football League, The Championship is shown for the final time.

== 2010s ==
- 2010
  - February – ITV shows live cricket for the first time since 1970 when it begins showing coverage of the Indian Premier League. ITV then decides to take out a four-year deal for the event as well as also showing highlights of the 2010/11 Ashes series
  - July – Having only previously shown live coverage at the weekend, ITV shows live coverage of every stage of the Tour de France for the first time.
  - ITV decides to drop its coverage of boxing on the grounds that it considers the sport to be no longer financially viable.
  - October – ITV returns to the green baize when it broadcasts coverage of a new tournament called Power Snooker. The following year ITV signs a deal to show the next three events.
- 2011
  - September – Having lost the contract to show the Grand Slam of Darts to Sky Sports, ITV picks up the rights to the European Darts Championship and the Second Players Championship Finals of 2011.
- 2012
  - June – ITV Sport takes over as terrestrial broadcaster of tennis’ French Open. ITV shows full live coverage, mainly on ITV4, as opposed to the partial coverage shown by the previous rights holder, the BBC. This is the first time since 1968 that ITV has shown coverage of one of the sport's big four tournaments.
  - September – ITV becomes the lead broadcaster of the Europa League which includes exclusive coverage of the latter stages, including the final, for the next three seasons.
  - 23 October – ITV Sport launches a new documentary series called Sports Life Stories.
- 2013
  - 25 February-3 March – ITV makes a full return to snooker when it signs a deal to broadcast the World Open. This is the first world ranking event ITV has shown for 20 years. It only shows the event once before it moves to Eurosport.
  - 14 June – The PDC and ITV announce a new deal to cover four tournaments a year from 2013 to 2015. The tournaments are The Players Championship which they had covered from 2009 to 2010 and from December 2011 – present, The European Championship which they covered previously in 2008 and 2011, a new tournament called the Masters where the top 16 face in other in a three-day tournament, and from 2014, the UK Open which had previously been shown on Sky. A fifth tournament is added to ITV's contract the following year, for the World Series of Darts Finals.
  - 19–24 November – ITV expands its snooker coverage when it shows the revived Champion of Champions tournament. Coverage of broadcast on ITV4. It continues to show the tournament to this day.
- 2014
  - The BBC regains the rights to the FA Cup, which it shares with BT Sport. However ITV retains the contract to show live coverage of the England football team.
  - 17 March – ITV becomes the broadcaster of the new Formula E series, showing the 10 events on ITV4. ITV also shows the 2015 championship.
  - 1 June – ITV's live coverage of the Indian Premier League ends, having shown the event since 2010.
- 2015
  - 14 February-29 March – ITV shows highlights of the 2015 Cricket World Cup. This is the first and so far only time that ITV has covered the cricket World Cup.
  - 6 June – After 23 seasons, ITV's live broadcasting of the UEFA Champions League ends when it shows coverage of the 2015 UEFA Champions League Final. However it does continue to show highlights with all live coverage moving to BT Sport.
  - 12–16 October – ITV broadcasts parasports for the first time when it shows live coverage of the World Wheelchair Rugby Challenge.
- 2017
  - 1 January – ITV takes over from Channel 4 as the exclusive terrestrial broadcaster of horse racing. The deal will see ITV broadcast nearly 100 days of racing each year - 60 on ITV4 and minimum of 34 fixtures on the main ITV channel. This is the first time since 1988 that the sport had been shown on ITV.
  - 4 February – Following ITV's return to covering live boxing, the channel launches a pay-per-view channel ITV Box Office.
  - February – The BBC and ITV begin a five-year contract as joint broadcasters of the Six Nations Championship. They had joined forces to prevent the tournament being sold to pay television.
  - May – ITV ends its nine-year association with Premiership Rugby when it loses rights to highlights of the league to Channel 5. It also loses the rights to Moto GP to Channel 5 at the same time.
  - 9-26 August – ITV and ITV4 show the 2017 Women's Rugby World Cup live with the final broadcast live on ITV.
- 2018
  - 26 May – After more than 25 years, ITV's coverage of the UEFA Champions League ends after they lose the highlights rights to BT Sport.
  - December – ITV and Al Haymon’s Premier Boxing Champions sign a three-year agreement which will see at least 15 events being shown on ITV Box Office and ITV4.
- 2019
  - 19–24 March – ITV televises a new snooker tournament - the Tour Championship. Consequently, ITV now broadcasts four top snooker tournaments each year with current deals running until 2022.
  - 20 September – 2 November – CITV Breakfast on ITV is temporarily suspended due to the Rugby World Cup.

== 2020s ==
- 2020
  - 24 January – ITV announces that it has closed its pay-per-view service ITV Box Office.
- 2021
  - 13 June – ITV broadcasts the French Open tennis tournament for the final time following Eurosport gaining exclusive rights to the event from 2022 onwards.
  - 7 August – The FA Community Shield returns to ITV Sport.
  - 17 September – ITV broadcasts coverage of the England women's football team for the first time.
  - 7 November – The FA Cup returns to ITV as part of a new deal with the BBC which sees the two broadcasters sharing the rights to the competition. This is the first time since 1989 that the competition has been shown fully and exclusively on terrestrial television, and it is the first time that ITV has broadcast the FA Cup since 2014.
- 2022
  - 30 January – Premiership Rugby returns to ITV screens after five years and the new deal sees ITV show a live match for the first time. ITV will show 12 live matches over the two years of the contract, including the Premiership Final, as well as a weekly highlights show in ITV4.
  - 31 July – Highlights rights to the English Football League and the League Cup move to ITV after four years on Quest.
  - 21 August – ITV shows the first of ten games from this season's LaLiga.
  - 9 September – After seven years on the BBC, terrestrial coverage of the NFL returns to ITV. The deal includes the rights to show two of the three NFL London Games and the Super Bowl in addition to a weekly highlights programme.
  - October – ITV replaces Channel 4 as terrestrial broadcaster of rugby union's Heineken Cup.
- 2023
  - 20 July-20 August – The BBC and ITV broadcast the 2023 FIFA Women's World Cup. Their coverage arrangement mirrors that of the men's World Cup with both broadcasters airing live coverage of the same number of games and both broadcasting the final live.
- 2024
  - Undated – ITV resumes its live coverage of the England men's football team.
- 2025
  - January – Live league football is shown on ITV for the first time since 1996 when the broadcaster shows the first of five matches that it will air from the EFL Championship during the second half of the 2024-25 season.
  - 4 February – Super Bowl LIX concludes ITV's Coverage of the NFL before moving back to Channel 5.
  - 17 May – ITV's latest period of televising FA Cup games ends after the 2025 final.
  - 25 June – ITV ends its contract with World Snooker Tour, having reached a height of showing 5 tournaments per season. The world ranking events they showed will transfer to Channel 5 in 2026.
  - 27 July – ITV broadcasts coverage of the Tour de France for the final time.
  - August – ITV begins broadcasting ten EFL Championship games and nine Carabao Cup matches, including two QF, one semi and the final, live for the next two seasons. This is in addition to ITV showing highlights from both competitions.
  - 7 November – Just before the 2025 Champion of Champions begins, Matchroom Sport announces that ITV will continue to be the broadcasting partner of the tournament for three more years. With the exception of Power Snooker, ITV will have broadcast snooker for 15 consecutive years since 2012, the year it officially returned to broadcasting tournaments from the World Snooker Tour, having previously dropped its coverage in 2001.

== See also ==
- History of ITV
- Timeline of BBC Sport
- Timeline of sport on Channel 4
- Timeline of sport on Channel 5
