= Gower's Cricket Monthly =

Gower's Cricket Monthly is a BBC2 magazine show presented by the former England batsman David Gower after he retired from the game. It was the first terrestrial magazine show ever devoted to the sport. According to Gower, the beginnings of the show date back to the 1993 cricket season; it ran for four series from 1995 to 1998, plus some spin-off programmes to preview major finals. It also complemented the new weekly Cricket Focus that ran in Grandstand during the same period.

== Format ==
The shows consisted of highlights, features, previews and interviews.

The first three series were all linked on location but the fourth was presented from studio TC5 at TV Centre. It was the first BBC Sport show to have its own website during the early days of the internet.

Regular reporters included Ralph Dellor, Mark Little, Simon Hughes, Steve Lee, Chris Broad, Fiona Stephenson, Mike Wedderburn, Jonathan Agnew, Eddie Butler and Steve May. The show was pitched as appealing to a 'youth' audience, leading to Geoffrey Boycott's initial omission.

The series ended in 1998 when the BBC lost the cricket rights to Channel 4.

== Reception ==
Following the show's first episode, Stan Hey, writing in the The Independent, described the show as "promising", albeit "hit-and-miss" due to its segmented format.

Several commentators remarked on the show's use of gimmicks such as computer animations and video editing techniques in an attempt to make the show seem more youth-oriented, incongruous given its lack of innovation in underlying content. Some viewed it as a missed opportunity to connect to 1990s innovations in cricket pop culture and fandom.

Following the BBC's loss of cricket broadcasting rights in 1998, The Cricketer criticized the BBC for moving the show between timeslots.

== Series One - 1995 ==
Episode One - 15 May

Linked from The Duchess of Norfolk's XI v West Indies at Arundel. Featuring the Jimmy Adams Video Diary, Highlights of Australia v West Indies, Mike Atherton interview, preview of the summer, Darren Gough interview, Pakistan's controversies, Allan Donald's bowling masterclass, Young Players to follow, (Jason Gallian, Alistair Brown, Glenn Chapple and Richard Stemp), Rory Bremner picking his favourite memories from the archives, Mark Little exploring the eccentricities of County Cricket in Derby and a county round up.

Episode Two - 19 June

Linked from Chester-Le-Street. Featuring Chris Tarrant's favourite moments, Mark Little playing cricket in the Scilly Isles, a feature on Dickie Bird, Jimmy Adams's Video Diary, Ian Bishop interview, Graham Gooch batting masterclass and a county round up.

Episode Three - 12 July

Episode Four - 8 August

Linked from Holland. Featuring the 4th Test review, 5th Test preview, Richie Benaud and Dermot Reeve on captaincy, Dutch cricket, Jimmy Adams's Video Diary, Mark Little as 12th man for Hampshire v Young Australia, Frank Skinner's personality pick, Mark Ramprakash's fielding masterclass, Women's Cricket, Soweto Cricket Club and a county round up.

Episode Five - 19 September

Linked from Canterbury. Featuring the conclusion of the County Championship, a preview of the winter, Jimmy Adams's Video Diary, Mark Little looking at how the game is covered on TV, Gary Lineker interviewing Mike Atherton, Jack Russell's wicketkeeping masterclass, Hansie Cronje's BBQ with Jane Robinson, the commentators picking their players of the year and Bill Wyman's cricket memories.

== Series Two - 1996 ==
Episode One - 22 April

Linked from Chelmsford. Featuring Cricket in Crisis, Geoff Boycott's views, World Cup Highlights, Dermot Reeve's Video Diary, County Preview, Young Guns Anthony McGrath and Alex Tudor and Players in the Winter.

Episode Two - 21 May

Linked from Hove. Featuring History of England v India, Ravi Shastri interview, India preview, Mohammad Azharuddin interview, Cricket in Scotland, Geoff Boycott's views, Brian Lara interview, Richie Richardson interview, Angus Fraser's Video Diary, Cricketing Artists and the news roundup.

Episode Three - 16 June

Linked from Lord's. Featuring 1st Test review, Ravi Shastri interview, Leicestershire feature, Geoff Boycott's views, Women's Cricket feature, Chris Adams's Video Diary and the news roundup.

Episode Four - 9 July

Linked from Trent Bridge. Featuring a review of the India series, Geoff Boycott's views, Pakistan preview, History of England v Pakistan, Leg-Spin feature, Player's Wives feature, B&H Final preview and the news roundup.

Episode Five - 19 August

Linked from Worcester. Featuring a 2nd Test review, Geoff Boycott's views, The Butcher Brothers (Mark & Gary singing and playing guitars in Cardiff), Overseas Players, Protective Gloves and news round up.

Episode Six - 9 September

Linked from Leicester. Featuring reviews of the county and international seasons, the story of Durham, Geoff Boycott's views and the inaugural winner of The One Test Wonders, hosted by John Stephenson.

GCM Special - Nat West Cup Final Preview - 6 September

Linked from Lord's. Featuring Ian Austin interview, Ronni Irani interview, Ted Dexter feature, Geoff Miller feature, Lancashire Squad and Essex squad.

== Series Three - 1997 ==
Episode One - 20 May

Linked from Worcester. Featuring an Australian preview with Mark Taylor, Shane Warne and David Boon, Jonathan Agnew looking at the state of the game in England, Simon Hughes reporting on Irish cricket, Chris Adams rallying, great Ashes moments, the Aussie fans view of the English and Geoff Boycott's views.

Episode Two - 14 June

Linked from The Oval. Featuring a First Test review, Ian Chappell's view, TMS's 40th anniversary, The England Captaincy, Matthew Fleming feature and a Gloucestershire feature.

Episode Three - 15 July

Presented from TV Centre, TC5 with Dean Headley as the studio guest. Featuring an Ashes round up, a review of the B&H Cup final, West Indies v Sri Lanka report, Dennis Lillee and Derek Randall meeting to look back at their epic 1977 encounter, Matthew Hayden sailing and Eddie Butler traveling to Umeå in Sweden to report on the most northerly game of cricket, played through the night on the longest day and under the midnight sun.

Episode Four - August

Presented from TV Centre, TC5 with Mike Gatting as the studio guest. Featuring a 5th Test review, Asian Cup report, Steve James feature, Derbyshire feature, Wasim Akram interview, Jonathan Agnew interviewing Derek Underwood in Antwerp to look back at his 7-50 at The Oval, reports on the England U19 and Women's cricket team and an 86-year-old wicket-keeper - Reg Harris who was still playing 3 times a week in his 71st season.

Episode Five - September

Featuring an end of season round-up, winter tour preview, County Championship review

GCM Special - Nat West Cup Final preview - 5 September

Linked from Lord's

== Series Four - 1998 ==
Episode One - 19 May

Presented from TV Centre, TC5 with Alec Stewart as the studio guest. Featuring previews of England v South Africa, Barry Richards interview, Devon Malcolm feature, Ed Giddins feature and a Robert Croft feature. It also saw the launch of the first website and email address to be used by a BBC Sports programme.

Episode Two - 17 June

Presented from TV Centre, TC5 with Barry Richards as the studio guest. Featuring a review of the First Test, South Africa at Arundel, Graeme Hick's 100 hundreds, a feature on county captains, a report on the role of the 12th man and a look back to Ian Botham's performances in 1978.

Episode Three - 22 July

Presented from TV Centre, TC5 with Stuart Law as the studio guest. Featuring reports on England and South Africa, a report on umpires and referees, a profile of Nick Knight, a feature on French cricket and a look back at Garry Sobers hitting six sixes in an over.

Episode Four - 26 August

Presented from TV Centre, TC5 with Barry Richards and David Graveney as the studio guests. Featuring a review of England's series win against South Africa, a preview of England v Sri Lanka, a look at the 1948 Australians, a feature on the Cowdrey family and Kent and a look at England wicketkeeping prospects.

Episode Five - 22 September

Presented from TV Centre, TC5 with James Whitaker as the studio guest. Featuring a county championship review, Chris Broad previewing the Ashes, the retirements of Dickie Bird and Mike Gatting, an item about Goodwood where the Laws of Cricket first originated, and a report on the women's Ashes series.
