= Timeline of sport on Channel 4 =

This is a timeline of sports coverage on Channel 4.

== 1980s and 1990s ==
- 1982
  - 2 November – Channel 4 launches with a remit to cover sports which are not generally shown on ITV and the BBC.
  - 7 November – Coverage of American football is shown for the first time, beginning the channel's long association with the sport.
  - 8 November – Channel 4 shows live sport for the first time when it broadcasts coverage of a match from Division One of the National Basketball League. It shows highlights of the first half of the game and live coverage of the second half
- 1983
  - 18–19 June – Channel 4 shows live coverage of the conclusion of the final two rounds of the US Open Golf Championship. Later in the Summer, Channel 4 airs the final two rounds of the US PGA Championship. Channel 4 also covers the 1984 events.
  - 7–14 August – Channel 4, in conjunction with ITV, broadcasts live coverage of the first World Athletics Championships in Helsinki, Finland.
- 1984
  - 22 March – Horse racing coverage is broadcast on Channel 4 for the first time, resulting in the launch of Channel 4 Racing.
  - 14–15 April – Channel 4 further increases its coverage of the American golfing majors when it broadcasts live coverage of the conclusion of the 3rd and 4th rounds of the Masters Tournament. Channel 4 also shows the 1985 event.
- 1985
  - ITV takes over as broadcaster of UK athletics meetings. It also begins to cover European meetings in addition to the major international athletics events. Some of the coverage is shown on Channel 4, especially for midweek European meetings whereby Channel 4 shows the second hour of coverage.
  - 16 June – Channel 4 ends its coverage of golf's American majors when it airs coverage of the 1985 PGA Championship.
  - 5 October – The first weekend horse racing is shown on Channel 4 when ITV transfers coverage of horse racing to Channel 4 ahead of the end of World of Sport.
  - 4 December – Due to a clash with the ITV morning broadcaster TV-am for a 9am UK time kick off, Scottish Television production Scotsport is screened on Channel 4 for the only time, broadcasting Australia v Scotland in a 1986 Football World Cup Qualifier.
- 1986
  - 26–31 August – Channel 4, in conjunction with ITV, shows coverage of the 1986 European Athletics Championships. This has been the only time that Channel 4 has broadcast coverage of this event.
- 1987
  - 28 August–6 September – Channel 4, in conjunction with ITV, shows the World Athletics Championships. It is not until 2011 that the event is seen again on Channel 4.
- 1988
  - September – Channel 4 broadcasts coverage of the 1988 US Open (tennis).
  - 17 September–2 October – Channel 4's only broadcast of the Olympic Games takes place when it broadcasts the overnight and breakfast coverage of the 1988 Olympic Games. ITV shows the daytime coverage.
- 1989
  - 7 October – Channel 4 launches a morning horse racing preview programme Morning Line. The 25-minute programme aired every Saturday and was shown regardless of whether Channel 4 was televising horse racing later that day.
- 1992
  - 6 September – The first edition of Football Italia is broadcast as part of Channel 4's deal to show Serie A. The channel continues to show Italian football for the next ten years.
- 1995
  - March – Following Channel 4 taking over as rights holder to race meetings at Cheltenham, they show the Cheltenham Festival for the first time.
- 1996
  - 11 April – Channel 4 trials an overnight sports programme. Airing for six weeks, Nightsports mixes comment and live action from America.
- 1997
  - 9 January – Channel 4 launches a permanent weekly overnight sports show Under the Moon. The programme features sports talk and American sporting action. It runs for two years.
  - Channel 4 takes over as broadcaster of domestic athletics, doing so for this season and the following season before the rights move to the BBC in 1999. They had previously shown athletics during the 1980s, in conjunction with ITV.
- 1998
  - 25 January – Channel 4's coverage of American football ends when it shows Super Bowl XXXII. This ends a relationship with the sport that had existed since its first week on the air.
  - 28 February – Channel 4 shows live coverage of the 1998 Africa Cup of Nations Final. This is the first time that the tournament has been shown in the UK.
- 1999
  - 1 July – Channel 4 starts broadcasting cricket following the channel sensationally obtaining the rights from the BBC the previous year with the final domestic live action being shown on the BBC at around this time.

== 2000s ==
- 2000
  - 10 June – Channel 4 shows The Derby for the final time as the contract for Epsom transfers to the BBC. They had shown the event since 1986 and exclusively since 1989. It will return to the channel in 2013 for three more years.
- 2001
  - July – Having shown the event since the station's launch, Channel 4 shows the Tour de France for the final time.
  - 12 August – Channel 4 decides to call full time on a decade of showing Serie A.
- 2002
  - 19 January – Channel 4 begins airing highlights from the World Rally Championship, after securing the rights from the BBC.
  - 1 May – At The Races launches. Channel Four Television Corporation is one of the partners involved in the venture.
- 2003
  - 9 November – Channel 4's coverage of the World Rally Championship ends after two years with live coverage of the final stage from Wales Rally GB.
- 2004
  - 29 March – At the Races closes down due to financial problems. It relaunches on June 11 without any involvement from Channel 4.
- 2005
  - September – Cricket is shown on Channel 4 for the final time until 2019.
- 2007
  - August – Following Channel 4 taking over as rights holder to race meetings at Goodwood, they show Glorious Goodwood for the first time.

== 2010s ==
- 2010
  - September – American football returns to Channel 4 after a twelve year hiatus when they start broadcasting the Sunday Night Football match.
- 2011
  - 27 August–4 September – Channel 4 shows live coverage of the 2011 World Championships in Athletics but due to the broadcaster's decision to focus on Paralympic Sports, they decide not to show the 2013 event even though it had bought the rights to the 2013 championships and passes on the rights to the BBC.
- 2012
  - 29 August–9 September – Channel 4 broadcasts live coverage of the 2012 Summer Paralympics. This is the first time that the event has been shown in full and Channel 4 broadcasts more than 150 hours of coverage on the main channel and on sister channel More4.
- 2013
  - 1 January – Channel 4 takes over as the exclusive terrestrial TV home of all horse racing in the UK. The BBC had scaled back its horse racing in recent years, gradually losing more and more events to Channel 4. Consequently, races such as The Grand National are shown by Channel 4 for the first time.
  - 20–28 July – The World Para Athletics Championships are broadcast on UK television for the first time when Channel 4's sister channel More4 broadcasts over five hours of live coverage daily throughout the Championship. More4 also broadcasts the 2015 Championships.
  - 8 September – Channel 4's American football coverage expands when it signs a new two-year deal with the NFL to become the terrestrial home to the game for the next two seasons. The deal sees the return of the Super Bowl to Channel 4, 16 years after it had last shown the event.
- 2014
  - 7–16 March – Channel 4 broadcasts live coverage of the 2014 Winter Paralympics. This is the first time that the Winter Paralympic Games has ever been seen on British television.
- 2015
  - 1 February – Channel 4's two-year return to broadcasting the NFL ends after it shows live coverage of Super Bowl XLIX.
- 2016
  - 18 March – Channel 4 shows Formula One motor racing for the first time. This comes about following the BBC's decision to end its deal with Formula One early. For the next three seasons, Channel 4 shows roughly half of the races live. The coverage is broadcast under the title of Channel 4 F1 and broadcasts live coverage of ten selected races live without advertisements and every race (even live) is shown as highlights, including the British Grand Prix and final race weekend.
  - 7–18 September – Channel 4 continues its coverage of Paralympic Sports when it shows live coverage of the 2016 Summer Paralympics.
  - 27 December – Channel 4 Racing comes to an end after more than 32 years ahead of the transfer of all terrestrial television coverage of the sport to ITV.
- 2017
  - 7 January – Channel 4 broadcasts darts for the first time when it shows live coverage of the 2017 BDO World Darts Championship. Channel 4 also shows the 2018 event.
  - 14–23 July – Channel 4 broadcasts full live coverage of the 2017 World Para Athletics Championships with the previous producer of Channel 4's athletics coverage, Sunset + Vine, being host broadcaster for the championships.
- 2018
  - 9–18 March – Channel 4 broadcasts live coverage of the 2018 Winter Paralympics. It provides more than 100 hours of television coverage on Channel 4 and 4seven, more than double the amount of coverage it had given to the 2014 Games.
  - 2 June – Channel 4 shows rugby union for the first time when it broadcasts live coverage of Wales' Summer tour.
  - October – Channel 4 expands its rugby union coverage when it begins showing one match from each round from the Heineken Cup. It also replaces Sky Sports as broadcaster of Ireland's Autumn internationals. It broadcasts the tournament for four seasons which ends after the 2022 competition, after which the rights move to ITV.
- 2019
  - 17 March – Sky Sports becomes the exclusive broadcaster of all Formula One races, apart from the British Grand Prix which continues to be shown on Channel 4. Channel 4 also broadcasts highlights of all the other races.
  - 14 July – Channel 4 shows live coverage of the 2019 Cricket World Cup Final. This is the first time since 2005 that live cricket has been shown on terrestrial television. Channel 4 had the rights to show highlights of the tournament. Sky Sports had the live rights to the tournament but had agreed to make the final available on free-to-air television if England made the final.

== 2020s ==
- 2020
  - 7 June – Channel 4 broadcasts the entire 1966 FIFA World Cup Final between England and West Germany. Aired as Final Replay '66, special permission is given by FIFA for the match to be shown in aid of the National Emergencies Trust's Coronavirus Appeal. The programme is presented by Gabby Logan, with commentary from Geoff Hurst and Glenn Hoddle.
  - 13 November – Channel 4 shows live and recorded coverage of rugby union's Autumn Nations Cup. Channel 4 shows live coverage of Ireland's matches and highlights of all other games.
- 2021
  - 5 February – Channel 4 broadcasts the first live coverage of a test match on terrestrial television for more than 15 years when it begins showing England's test series against India. However Channel 4's coverage does not include the one-day and T20 international matches as these are shown on Sky Sports.
  - July – Channel 4 broadcasts highlights of the three test matches of the 2021 British & Irish Lions tour to South Africa and airs live action from England's rugby union matches against the USA and Canada.
  - 10 July – In a follow-up to Final Replay '66, Channel 4 broadcasts the entire 1966 FIFA World Cup Final between England and West Germany in colour for the very first time.
  - 11 September – Channel 4 does a last-minute deal with rights-holder Amazon Prime to show live coverage of the final of the 2021 US Open – Women's Singles after Britain's Emma Raducanu reaches the final. This is the first time since the late 1980s that tennis has been shown on Channel 4.
  - 11 December – Channel 4 partners with Sky Sports F1 to broadcast the race of the 2021 Abu Dhabi Grand Prix to make the final of the season available to everyone in the UK.
- 2022
  - 29 January – Channel 4 broadcasts Formula E for the first time with round 2 of the 2022 Diriyah ePrix. Channel 4 had signed a multi-year broadcast agreement just 8 days before this event, with the opening round being streamed live on YouTube.
  - 9 February – Channel 4 broadcasts Chelsea's matches in the 2021 FIFA Club World Cup. This is the first time that Channel 4 has broadcast this event.
  - 12 February – Live Super League matches are broadcast on free-to-air television for the first time when Channel 4 shows the first of ten matches each season for the next two years. This is the first time in its 40-year history that Channel 4 has broadcast rugby league. However, the coverage will only last for these two seasons as, from 2024, the BBC takes over as free-to-air broadcaster of 12 live matches per season.
  - 4 June – Channel 4 shows live coverage of the England football team for the first time as part of a two-year deal which sees Channel 4 broadcast England's matches in the UEFA Nations League, European Qualifiers to UEFA Euro 2024 and International Friendlies.
  - 13 November – Channel 4 shows live coverage of the final of the 2022 ICC Men's T20 World Cup in which England plays Pakistan. The rest of the tournament had been shown by Sky Sports.
- 2023
  - 8 July – Channel 4 shows live coverage of the 2023 UEFA European Under-21 Championship final between England and Spain.
- 2025
  - 21 December–18 January 2026 – Channel 4 shows coverage of the 2025 Africa Cup of Nations.
- 2026
  - 22 February – The Women's FA Cup returns to Channel 4 for the next three seasons, replacing the BBC whose contract expired after the end of 2024-25 season.
  - 4 April – Channel 4 takes over as rights holder to the University Boat Race.

== See also ==
- Timeline of BBC Sport
- Timeline of ITV Sport
- Timeline of sport on Channel 5
