= Timeline of sport on Channel 5 =

This is a timeline of sports broadcasting on Channel 5.

== 1990s and 2000s ==
- 1997
  - 31 March – On its first night on air, Channel 5 launches its overnight coverage of American sports when it broadcasts the first edition of Live & Dangerous. The programme broadcasts on weekdays through the night and includes live coverage of American sport as well as highlights from American and other global sports events. The first programme features the opening day of the 1997 Major League Baseball season.
  - 31 May – Even though Channel 5 had said that it hadn't been intending to show live sport at peak time, it buys the rights to one of England's qualifying matches for the 1998 World Cup – an away match against Poland. It also shows the first of two international games of England's rugby union tour of Argentina.
  - Autumn – Football on 5 fully launches as football becomes a regular fixture of the channel's output following the purchases of rights to UEFA Cup games and away qualifying matches involving the home nations, showing the latter for the next decade.
- 1998
  - March – MLB on Five launches when Channel 5 decides to create a specific programme for its coverage of Major League Baseball.
- 1999
  - Undated – Channel 5 replaces Channel 4 as the terrestrial broadcaster of the NFL and airs coverage for the next six seasons.
- 2000
  - Channel 5 begins showing live coverage of MotoGP. It shows the event for the next three seasons.
  - Channel 5 broadcasts weekly highlights of the Zurich Premiership, and does so for just one season.
- 2001
  - 30 May-10 June – Channel 5 broadcasts the FIFA Confederations Cup. Channel 5 also shows the next two tournaments.
- 2002
  - Undated – Channel 5 buys the rights to the Scottish League Cup and shows the tournament for the next two seasons.
- 2004
  - June – Five’s regular coverage of the National Hockey League ends for two years when the primary broadcast rights move to NASN.
- 2006
  - May – Five becomes the terrestrial home of highlights of England cricket's home matches.
  - September – Five resumes its coverage of the National Hockey League.
- 2007
  - September –
    - Five gains the rights to broadcast Serie A highlights and live games in the 2007–08 season. with live games shown weekly at 1:30pm UK time on Sundays. Coverage is shown under the name of Football Italiano.
    - The NFL returns to Five when it signs a deal to broadcast Monday Night Football and NBC Sunday Night Football.
  - Five’s decade-long coverage of showing away fixtures of UK nations' international football teams ends.
- 2008
  - 27 June – Five decides to end its coverage of Serie A after just a single season.
  - 29 October – MLB on Five is broadcast for the final time, coinciding with Channel 5 deciding to end its coverage of Major League Baseball due to the Great Recession.
  - 11–21 December – Five shows live coverage of the 2008 FIFA Club World Cup.
- 2009
  - 12 June – Five’s coverage of the NHL finishes. It also ends its coverage of the NBA at the same time.
  - September – Five becomes the lead broadcaster of the UEFA Europa League meaning it can show the entire tournament, including the final, for the first time. Previously it had only been able to show the early rounds due to the BBC or ITV having the rights from the quarter-finals onwards.
  - 9 September – Five signs a deal to broadcast highlights of the Ultimate Fighting Championship (UFC) on terrestrial television in the UK.

== 2010s ==
- 2010
  - Undated – Five ends its live overnight coverage of American sport, when it decides not to continue its coverage of American football. This brings to an end its coverage of American sport which had been a mainstay of Channel 5's weeknight overnight programming since the channel’s launch.
- 2011
  - 23 July – Channel 5 enters the boxing ring when broadcasts the Derek Chisora vs. Tyson Fury fight. The high viewing figures sees the broadcaster sign a deal with Hennessy Sports to bring the sport to Channel 5 screens in a regular basis.
  - Undated – Channel 5 broadcasts the Great Birmingham Run and Great South Run for the first time. This is the channel's first coverage of athletics.
- 2012
  - 9 May – Channel 5’s fifteen years of showing Europe’s second tier football clubs competition ends when it shows live coverage of the 2012 UEFA Europa League Final.
  - 28 July – Football on 5 ends after the channel stops showing live football following the transfer of the rights to show the UEFA Europa League to ITV. The last game to be shown is a pre-season friendly.
- 2015
  - Undated – Channel 5 expands its coverage of Mixed Martial Arts when it begins showing highlights to every BAMMA event.
  - 8 August – Football returns to Channel 5 when it takes over the contract to broadcast highlights of the Football League and the League Cup. It launches two new programmes under the revived Football on 5 banner. They are called The Championship and The Goal Rush. The programmes are broadcast from 9pm on Saturday evening.
- 2016
  - 4 September – Channel 5 acquires the UK broadcasting rights to Formula E from the 2016–17 season following Formula E's termination of its contract with ITV. It shows all races from round three and then shows all of the following season.
- 2017
  - Coverage of MotoGP returns to Channel 5 although this time the coverage of restricted to highlights only. Channel 5 covers the event for the next two years.
  - September – Channel 5 takes over from ITV as broadcaster of highlights of the Aviva Premiership, returning the league to C5 screens for the first time since 2001 . The deal also sees five matches per season broadcast live by the channel. This is the first time that the league has been shown live on terrestrial TV. The also includes highlights of the Premiership Rugby Cup.
- 2018
  - 6 May – Football League Tonight is broadcast for the final time, thereby ending Channel 5’s three-year deal to show highlights of the English Football League.
- 2019
  - 15 September – After 14 seasons, Channel 5 shows cricket highlights for the final time. The rights transfer to the BBC from 2020 onwards.

== 2020s ==
- 2020
  - 14 September – Channel 5, now part of the CBS Sports family, resumes its coverage of the NFL when it starts showing the weekly Monday night game plus a weekly highlights show produced by CBS Sports.
- 2021
  - 27 June – Channel 5 ends its 4 year run as free-to-air broadcaster of the Gallagher Premiership by airing highlights of the final at Twickenham Stadium that took place the previous day.
- 2022
  - 2 March – Wasserman Boxing and Channel 5 announce a deal which will see Channel 5 air five fight nights Wasserman Boxing-promoted fight nights during 2022. This is later extended to cover 2023.
- 2023
  - 5 October – 19 November – Channel 5 is the highlights broadcaster of the 2023 Cricket World Cup. It also shows live coverage of the final.
- 2024
  - 8–12 May – Coverage of the World Seniors Snooker Championship moves to Channel 5.
- 2025
  - 8 June – Channel 5 shows live T20 cricket for the first time, the first of four T20 internationals featuring the England team that the broadcaster will show each summer until 2028.
  - 14 June – 13 July – Channel 5 shows live coverage of the FIFA Club World Cup, broadcasting 23 matches, including the final, as part of a sub let deal with DAZN - who Channel 5 uses for their broadcast coverage.
  - 7 September – Channel 5 starts showing two NFL games/week during the regular season - the 6pm on Five and the 9.15pm on 5Action. Channel 5 also shows the London and Dublin matches, three play-off games and the Super Bowl.
  - After 14 years, Channel 5 steps out of the boxing ring.
- 2026
  - 17 February – Channel 5's coverage of snooker expands when it begins to show the Players Championship. Channel 5 will also broadcast the Tour Championship and the British Open.
  - 4 July – Channel 5 will show daily highlights of the Tour de France, and will also cover Vuelta a Espana. Both will be shown until 2028.
  - 23 July–2 August – 5 will show nightly highlights of the 2026 Commonwealth Games.
- 2027
  - 2–4 July – Channel 5 will broadcast live coverage of the UK stages of the 2027 Tour de France, and for the rest of the event, 5 will broadcast nightly highlights.

== See also ==
- Timeline of BBC Sport
- Timeline of ITV Sport
- Timeline of sport on Channel 4
