= Final Score =

British football news and results programme

- Presented by: Ray Stubbs (2001–2009); Gabby Logan (2009–2013); Jason Mohammad (2013–present)
- Opening theme: "In Da Club" by 50 Cent (2003/04–2004/05) "Theme From Sparta F.C." by The Fall (2005/06–2008/09) "Jump in the Pool" by Friendly Fires (2009/10–2010/11) "The King and All of His Men" by Wolf Gang (2011/12–2012/13) "Pumpin Blood" by NONONO (2013/14–2018/19) "Bones" by Galantis feat. OneRepublic (2019/20–2022/23) "I Saw" by Young Fathers (2023/24-2024/25) "Shining Bright" by William Baxter-Noon (2025/26-present)
- Country of origin: United Kingdom
- Original language: English

Production
- Production location: dock10 studios
- Running time: 180 minutes (Red Button and BBC Online); 45–90 minutes (BBC One or BBC Two)

Original release
- Network: BBC One; BBC Two; BBC Red Button
- Release: 11 October 1958 – present

Related
- Grandstand; Match of the Day; Match of the Day 2 Football Focus; The Football League Show; Match of the Day Kickabout; The Premier League Show

Final Score is a British football news and results programme produced by BBC Sport and is aired on late Saturday afternoons. Final Score is also broadcast on Boxing Day and New Year's Day and sometimes on either Good Friday or Easter Monday. A special Sunday edition is broadcast on the final day of the Premier League season.

Final Score is also broadcast on Saturday afternoons on the BBC Red Button and online for an hour before the BBC One broadcast begins. An additional half-hour was also broadcast live on BBC World News, the BBC's internationally broadcast news channel, but this was discontinued from the 2015–16 season.

== Format ==
The programme provides viewers with the results from the main football matches played on that day. The presenters are joined by two studio pundits discussing the day's play whilst watching the Premier League games in the studio and this is supplemented by reporters at all of the Premier League matches. There are also reporters at every EFL Championship match and at the top games in EFL League One and EFL League Two, and at least one Scottish Professional Football League game. Mark Clemmit or Kelly Somers provides regular roundups of the top stories from the rest of the EFL matches. The programme also includes interviews with managers and players.

Just after 17:00, when all of the results are in, the classified results are read out. The round-up covers games from the Premier League, EFL Championship, EFL League One, EFL League Two and the National League in England, in Scotland the four divisions of the William Hill Scottish Professional Football League as well as the Cymru Premier in Wales and the Irish League in Northern Ireland. Next is a review of the league tables in England and Scotland and this is followed by post-game interviews with managers, conducted by the commentators for Match of the Day. After the main BBC television broadcast has finished the programme continues until 17:30 on the Red Button.

== History ==
=== Early days ===
Final Score had been part of the BBC's Grandstand since the programme's launch in 1958. The football results appeared on a device dubbed "the Teleprinter" and the presenter stood next to the Teleprinter with a camera pointed at the actual printer. By the 1980s, a live shot of the printer had been replaced by an on-screen computerised version and was renamed the vidiprinter.

The results would come from the Press Association (PA), who appointed a correspondent to attend each match and report back the half-time and full-time scores to its offices in London. The PA would then use the technology of the day to provide a feed to BBC Television Centre (TVC). The Press Association provided the vidiprinter results service until Opta Sports took over the contract for the 2013–14 season onwards. The host of the main Grandstand programme used to provide commentary on the scores as they came in to try to reflect how each result affected the league, which meant meticulous preparation was necessary.

After the majority of the results came in, the scores would then be collated and announced as the 'Classified Football Results' in alphabetical order starting with the highest leagues first. Remarkably, until 2025 only three people had regularly read the football results on the programme: Len Martin (from 1958 until 1995), Tim Gudgin (from 1995 until 2011) and Mike West from 2011 until 2025. Gudgin read the results for the last time on 19 November 2011, then retired at the age of 81. He cited the BBC's decision to move the programme from London to Salford Quays as one of the reasons for his departure and the difficulty of travelling from his home in Hampshire, particularly in winter. Since the start of the 2025/26 season the football results have been read by the main presenter instead of a separate off-camera announcer. The classified results were followed by the pools news and score draws and then by the league tables, although the pools news element was dropped due to its decline.

Whilst football was always the mainstay of Final Score, news and results from other sports, such as rugby union, and until 1987 racing results, were also included.

A brief version, usually lasting for five to ten minutes, was aired in the summer during the football close season and these summer editions included a cricket scoreboard.

Stand-alone editions of Final Score were broadcast on Boxing Day, New Year's Day and Easter Monday when there was a full programme of football fixtures and when Grandstand was not being shown. These editions were generally fifteen minutes long and did not include the vidiprinter sequence as they usually began at 16:50.

=== Changes ===
Technology has gradually improved and by the start of the 1980s, a live shot of the actual Teleprinter was replaced by a computer screen version, at which point the Teleprinter became referred to as "the Vidiprinter". However, the modern-day vidiprinter used by the programme continued to emulate the original typing system. There are now goal flashes throughout the afternoon for every match played in the English and Scottish leagues, the National League, Cymru Premier and from four European leagues, as well as from the FA Cup and the later rounds of the Scottish Cup.

=== 21st century ===
During its last few years there was no longer a main presenter for Grandstand, so from the start of the 2001–02 season Final Score was broadcast as an individual programme with Ray Stubbs as the regular presenter and Mark Lawrenson providing comment on the results as they came in. At this point, Final Score became a football-only programme and was only broadcast during the football season. The following season saw Final Score beginning earlier and by the end of that season it had settled to a start time of 16:30.

The half time round-up remained part of Grandstand until the start of the 2004–05 season when an afternoon-long version of the programme was launched on the BBC's interactive service. Initially called Score Interactive, the programme broadcast from 14:30 and provided a rolling mix of scores, reports and punditry. At 16:30, BBC One joined the programme and after the end of the BBC One broadcast, it would continue on the interactive service until 18:00.

In November 2007 a midweek version of the programme was introduced. Rather than being a programme in its own right, it is a simulcast of BBC Radio 5 Live with graphics and vidiprinter. Audio options were occasionally made available for BBC Local Radio commentaries of games involving Championship sides, but this was removed when the BBC decided to make the Red Button service a "single feed" to all broadcast platforms in October 2012. The midweek version is shown when there were primarily Premier League or important UEFA Champions League matches taking place. It is a Red Button and Online exclusive, so therefore does not appear on BBC One or BBC Two.

When the BBC regained the rights for the FA Cup in 2014–15, the programme would be renamed FA Cup Final Score when the competition is the main focus, including a modified logo featuring the FA Cup trophy and Sunday broadcasts which show the key incidents from the day's games. Although focussing on the FA Cup, there are also updates from matches in other domestic competitions that are taking place.

Beginning with the 2017-18 season, the show's graphics were updated to tie in with a rebrand of BBC Sport.

Staring in August 2026, the programme's airtime on BBC One was expanded, now staring each week at 3.45pm, instead of 4.30pm. The programme now airs on BBC One Scotland every week for the first time as BBC Scotland's bespoke results coverage did not return for the 2026/27 season.

== Studio ==
Following the 19 November 2011 broadcast, Final Score moved from studio TC5 at Television Centre in London - which had been its home for many years - to the Dock10 facility in MediaCityUK at, Salford Quays.

Ahead of the 2019–20 Premier League season, BBC Sport upgraded the studio that Match of the Day, Match of the Day 2, Football Focus, and Final Score broadcasts from.

The facility uses a "4K UHD ready virtual reality studio." It uses Epic Games' Unreal Engine 4 rendering technology.

== Presenter and pundits ==
The current main presenter of Final Score is Jason Mohammad, who replaced Gabby Logan at the start of the 2013–14 season. Stand-in presenters include Eilidh Barbour, Kelly Somers and Will Perry. The programme was previously presented by Ray Stubbs until he left the BBC at the end of the 2008–09 season.

Two (or occasionally three) pundits appear per episode. Pundits who appear on the programme most commonly as of the 2025/26 season are Martin Keown, Dion Dublin, Leon Osman, Ashley Williams, Fara Williams, Stephen Warnock, Ellen White, Steph Houghton, Shay Given and Chris Sutton. Many other pundits have appeared during the history of the programme, including: Robbie Savage, Jason Roberts, Mark Bright, Steve Claridge, Garth Crooks, Peter Schmeichel, Danny Mills, Kevin Kilbane, Alex Scott, and Trevor Sinclair. Sinclair was fired by the BBC in January 2018 after admitting drink driving and racial abuse charges.

Reporters appearing most weeks include Hamish Marshall, Marc Webber, Martin Fisher, Sohail Sahi, Naz Premji, John Southall, John Acres, Will Perry, Eilidh Barbour, Laurence Herdman, Mike Williams, Andy Stevenson, Chris Wise, Mark Scott, Adam Cottier, Nick Hatton, Henry Moeran, Adam Whitty, Tom Gayle, John Bennett, Nesta McGregor, Aaron Paul, Andy Sixsmith, Nikesh Rughani, Maz Farookhi, Betty Glover, Shourjo Sarkar, Connie McLaughlin, Ben Mundy, Laura Kenyon, Paul Scott, Niall McCaughan, Ben Croucher, Joshua Adu-Donkor, Lee Blakeman, Charlotte Richardson, Chris Coles, Rebecca Adams, Rich Wolfenden, Flo Pollock, Gavin Wallace, Gavin Ramjaun, Cameron Pope, Ryan Bromliow, Owain Gwynedd and Samantha Fletcher.

== Theme tune ==
The current theme tune is "Shining Bright" by William Baxter-Noon and has been since the start of the 2025-26 football season. Previous themes have included:

Year range	Song	Artist
2003–2005	In da Club	50 Cent
2005–2009	Theme From Sparta F.C.	The Fall
2009–2011	Jump in the Pool	Friendly Fires
2011–2013	The King and All of His Men	Wolf Gang
2013–2019	Pumpin Blood	NONONO
2019–2023	Bones	Galantis feat. OneRepublic
2023–2025	I Saw	Young Fathers
2025–present	Shining Bright	William Baxter-Noon
