= Sam Leitch =

British sports presenter

Samuel James Leitch (1927– 24 January 1980) was a Scottish journalist and television sports presenter. He worked at no less than eight newspapers as either a reporter, sports editor or columnist. Leitch was responsible for editing BBC sports programmes such as Match of the Day and Sportsnight before he was appointed head of sport on BBC Television in 1974. He was appointed controller of sport and outside broadcasts at Thames Television in 1978.

== Career ==
Leitch was born in Glasgow, and received most of his training in Greenock. He moved to London in 1951, where he worked for the Daily Mirror newspaper. In 1967, he was voted the recipient of the Sportswriter of the Year Award while working for the Sunday Mirror. Leitch worked as a sports journalist, sports editor or columnist at a total of eight newspapers over the course of his career, such as the Daily Express, the Manchester Evening News, the Leicester Mercury and the Greenock Telegraph, travelling across Europe principally as a table tennis reporter. He joined the staff at the BBC in 1968, having worked freelance for them since 1960. Leitch was the editor of Match of the Day and Sportsnight at the corporation for some years. For several years up to 1974 Leitch presented and wrote the script for the Football Preview slot on Grandstand on a Saturday, previewing the day's matches. This was later to evolve into Football Focus.

He was appointed head of sport on BBC Television in March 1974, replacing Bryan Cowgill and worked on the 1976 Summer Olympics in Montreal and the 1974 FIFA World Cup. In May 1977, Leitch asked the BBC to release him from his contract two years early after he was approached by the American television network NBC to work in Europe. He additionally worked for West German television, selling Iron Curtain television spots to the world for Lother Boch's agency. In January 1978, he was appointed controller of sport and outside broadcasts at the London weekday television broadcaster Thames Television by managing director Cowgill and began work the following month. Leitch was the executive producer of ITV's coverage of the 1978 FIFA World Cup in Argentina. At the time of his death, he was set to be the executive producer of ITV's coverage of the 1980 Summer Olympics in Moscow, working with his Thames deputy Paul Lang and London Weekend Television's controller of sport John Bromley.

It was Leitch who, when the Scottish football team Raith Rovers won a match, said "They'll be dancing in the streets of Raith tonight". As the team actually play in the town of Kirkcaldy, the misinformed comment became celebrated by the club's fans.

== Personal life ==
Leitch was married to Shirley. He died from a heart attack in London on 24 January 1980 at the age of 52. Leitch's funeral was held at Golders Green Crematorium on 4 February, and a memorial service for him took place at St Bride's Church, Fleet Street on 4 March.
