= Len Stevens =

Len or Leonard Stevens or Stephens may refer to:

- Len Stevens (composer) (died 1989), British composer
- Len Stevens (basketball) (born 1942), retired college basketball coach
- Leonard Stephens, American football player
- Leonard R. Stephens
