= Mike Costello =

British sports broadcaster

Mike Costello (born April 1960) is a British sports broadcaster. He is the main boxing commentator for DAZN, having previously worked at BBC Radio for 45 years.

== Early life ==
Costello grew up in Camberwell in south London. Both his parents were Irish immigrants, living in London before they met. An amateur boxer, he also worked as a boxing trainer, training Adam Booth and Henry Akinwande before choosing to focus on his broadcasting career.

== Career ==
Costello began his career at the BBC in 1979 as a filing clerk in the accounts department. Due to a restructure, he moved to the accounts department within the BBC World Service, where later he became a runner and then a Broadcast Assistant on the BBC World Service sports desk. Costello reported on cricket for the BBC World Service in the late 1980s and early 1990s, including the MRF World Series in Pakistan in 1989 and England's tour of India of 1992-93. He also reported on athletics, including at the 1992 Summer Olympics in Barcelona.

Costello's first commentary was at the 1995 World Athletics Championships in Gothenburg, Sweden. At the Commonwealth Games in 2002, after John Rawling lost his voice, Costello was asked to commentate live over multiple nights. After John Rawling moved to ITV in 2005, Costello became lead commentator for boxing and athletics across BBC's domestic radio output.

In June 2021, Costello signed a deal with DAZN to commentate on their coverage of boxing, ending his long tenure covering boxing with the BBC. In 2025 he rejoined BBC radio 5 live as a freelance covering their athletics coverage.
