= Late Kick Off =

- Late Kick Off logo
- Genre: Sport
- Country of origin: United Kingdom
- Original language: English
- No. of series: 5
- No. of episodes: 64

Production
- Running time: 30 minutes

Original release
- Network: BBC One
- Release: 18 January 2010 – 5 May 2014

Related
- The Football League Show

Late Kick Off is a BBC One regional television football programme which was broadcast between 2010 and 2015. Launched on 18 January 2010, it covered Football League teams on a regional or pan-regional basis in a magazine-style format. The show was usually broadcast on Monday nights, although it was broadcast on Sunday evenings during the 2012 series.

The 2014 series of the programme was the last, with the end of the programme announced in December 2014 amid speculation the BBC lost the rights of the Football League to Channel 5, this was confirmed in May 2015 with the final Football League Show airing on 25 May 2015.

The show was in a similar vein to ITV's Soccer Night, and complemented The Football League Show which aired throughout the season on Saturday nights.

In three of the regions (North East and Cumbria, East, South/West/South West) the programme was produced by local independent production companies.

== History ==
When the show was announced in 2010 it was to follow on from the BBC Football League Show on Saturday Night showing highlights in the regions across England from after Christmas to the end of the season, which happened on ITV in the regions across England when they had the Football League highlights.

Below is a list of hosts for the various regions during the history of the show

- BBC North West: Tony Livesey (2010–2014)
- BBC Midlands: Manish Bhasin (2010–2014)
- BBC North East and Cumbria: Mark Clemmit (2010–2013), Steve Bower (2014)
- BBC Yorkshire and Lincolnshire: Guy Mowbray (2010-2014)
- BBC East: Matt Holland (2010–2013), James Burridge (2014)
- BBC South, West and South West: Jonathan Pearce (2010), James Richardson (2011), Tony Husband (2012–2014)
- BBC London and South East: Mark Chapman (2010-2011), Jacqui Oatley (2012-2014)

== Episodes ==
Series	Start date	End date	Episodes
2010	18 January 2010	10 May 2010	16
2011	17 January 2011	9 May 2011	15
2012	16 January 2012	7 May 2012	15
2013	10 March 2013	5 May 2013	9
2014	3 March 2014	5 May 2014	9
