= Kelly Somers =

British television sports presenter and reporter (born 1990)

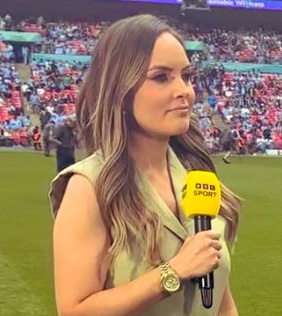
- Somers in 2023
- Born: Kelly Elizabeth Somers; 21 December 1990 (age 35); Watford, Hertfordshire, England
- Occupations: Journalist, presenter
- Children: 1

Kelly Elizabeth Somers (born 21 December 1990) is a British sports presenter and reporter, and a regular contributor to football coverage on radio and television in the UK. Among her presenting credits are appearances on the BBC, Talksport, Premier League Productions (PLP) and Optus Sport. On the BBC she has appeared on programmes such as Final Score, where she provides English Football League coverage alongside Mark Clemmit and Match of the Day. She can also be seen presenting Premier League Football coverage for Amazon Prime.

== Life and career ==
Born in Watford, Hertfordshire, Somers was educated at the town's Parmiter's School and gained work experience in journalism at the Watford Observer during her summer holidays. At the age of nine, during the 1999–2000 football season, she had won a writing competition held by the Watford Observer after she entered it with a 200-word report on Watford's 1–1 draw with Leicester. After attending Loughborough University, she secured a place at Nottingham Trent University to study for a postgraduate qualification in broadcast journalism, but was also offered a position at AFC Bournemouth. After four years with that club's media department, she moved to Premier League Productions, then became a freelance reporter.

She has worked for a number of media outlets, including the BBC and Talksport. In 2018 she presented coverage of the 2018 FIFA World Cup for Optus Sport, and in 2019 presented the BBC's coverage of the 2019 FIFA Women's World Cup. Following the onset of the COVID-19 pandemic, which required many activities, including football, to cease for a while, she was part of the reporting team to cover one of the first matches to be played when football was allowed to resume in June 2020. The game, which saw Bournemouth take on Crystal Palace, was also the first Premier League match to be shown live on BBC television, and the first top-level match to be aired by BBC television since 1988. In August 2020, she became the sixth woman to present an edition of Match of the Day when she provided coverage of the 2020 FA Community Shield, and in 2019 presented the BBC's coverage of the 2019 PDC World Darts Championship. She is also a regular presenter on BBC One's The Women's Football Show and Football Focus. Her other BBC roles have included providing coverage of England's progress during UEFA Euro 2020, and the 2022 FIFA World Cup.

In June 2022, Somers became part of the reporting team for Channel 4's coverage of the UEFA Nations League.

On 11 March 2023, she was one of several sports presenters working for the BBC who announced they would not appear on air following the BBC's decision to remove Gary Lineker from Match of the Day after controversial comments he made about the UK government's Illegal Migration Bill. It had initially been reported Somers would stand in for Alex Scott on Football Focus, but Somers subsequently announced she would not present the programme.

== Television ==
- Studs Up (2017)
- The Women's Football Show (2017–present)
- Final Score (2017–present)
- Football Focus (2019–present)
- Match of the Day (2018–2022)
- Match of the Day Live: Premier League (2020–2021)
- UEFA Nations League (2022–present)
