= The Football League Show =

- Also known as: The League Cup Show (Football League Cup highlights)
- Genre: Sport
- Presented by: Manish Bhasin
- Theme music composer: Snow Patrol
- Opening theme: "In the End"
- Ending theme: "Adultery"
- Composer: Little Comets
- Country of origin: United Kingdom
- Original language: English

Production
- Running time: 75 minutes

Original release
- Network: BBC One
- Release: 8 August 2009 – 25 May 2015

Related
- Match of the Day; Match of the Day 2 Football Focus; Final Score; Late Kick Off

The Football League Show is a BBC One football television show, primarily hosted by Manish Bhasin. It features match highlights from the Championship, League One and League Two. It began on 8 August 2009, at 11:45 pm and immediately followed Match of the Day on Saturdays. Similar to other BBC Sport studio shows, UK-based users of the BBC website could watch a live simulcast of the programme. The programme was made in Studio C at IMG studios, London. Football League highlights moved to Channel 5 for the 2015–2016 season, thus ending the BBC's version of the programme.

== Format ==
The programme had a similar format to ITV's Championship Goals, with a featured match receiving full highlights and all the goals from the other matches (thus repeating Match of the Day's format used in the early to the mid-90s). There could also be extensive highlights of any matches covered live by Sky Sports or the BBC itself. The programme was studio-based.

The first ever episode featured Steve Claridge and Ian Holloway but from the second episode onwards only featured Claridge as pundit or on some occasions former Torquay United and Brentford manager Leroy Rosenior. Occasionally both Claridge and Rosenior have appeared on the same programme offering analysis of matches.

When there were only Championship or League One and League Two matches played, the show was pre-recorded from the stadium of the featured match, rather than being live from the studio. These shows were often shorter than the regular ones. On 23 March 2013, the show was only 20 minutes long, this being the shortest show in the series and the first not to have a featured match.

== Presenter, commentators and reporters ==
The presenter of the show was Manish Bhasin, who left Football Focus to present. Whenever Bhasin was unavailable, the programme was hosted by Mark Chapman, Mark Clemmit, Damian Johnson or Jason Mohammad.

During each season, a number of reporters provided match roundups from the three divisions of the Football League. Regular reporters included Dave Beckett, Nick Halling, Paul Walker, Dan O'Hagan, Dan Mason, Tony Lockwood, Chris Maughan, Mick Conway, Sue Thearle, James Richardson and Jonathan Legard. Commentators on featured matches included John Roder, Martin Fisher, Tony Gubba, Kevin Keatings, Jon Champion, Jonathan Pearce, Guy Mowbray, Simon Brotherton and Steve Wilson.

BBC Radio 5 Live's Mark Clemmit was the roving reporter, who visited a ground to spend the day with a team each week. This was similar in style to Kevin Day's reports on Match of the Day 2.

== Interactive ==
There was also an interactive email segment where fans expressed their points of view. These emails were read out by one of the BBC's sports news presenters, mainly Jacqui Oatley or Lizzie Greenwood-Hughes. This feature was dropped from the start of the 2011–12 football season.

== Other programmes ==
The BBC's rights deal with the Football League also included the Football League Cup, where the programme was rebranded as The League Cup Show. Highlights of the Football League Trophy final were also shown on the BBC, where the show was simply branded as the Football League Trophy Final. Rather than being broadcast live from a studio, it was recorded pitchside from Wembley Stadium, the venue of the final. Highlights from the earlier rounds were available on the BBC Sport website up until the 2011–12 season.

A regional spin-off programme, Late Kick Off, launched on Monday 18 January 2010, broadcasting weekly from January until the end of the season.

== End of the programme ==
In 2015, the BBC lost the rights to the Football League to Channel 5 beginning in August of that year, with Channel 5 offering the same money that the BBC paid for the previous three years but promising to show highlights at 9 pm, rather than after Match of the Day, which had been the traditional home while on the BBC. The last Football League Show aired on 25 May 2015, with highlights of the Championship play-off final from Wembley Stadium between Middlesbrough and Norwich City. The final few editions of the Football League Show featured memories and highlights from the past six seasons and featured credits naming all who worked on the show. Channel 5 showed highlights from the Football League's competitions on its own programme, Football League Tonight until August 2018 when they showed the highlights on Quest titled EFL on Quest.

== See also ==
- The Championship
- Football League Extra
- Football League Tonight
