= John Dykes =

Sports broadcaster based in Singapore

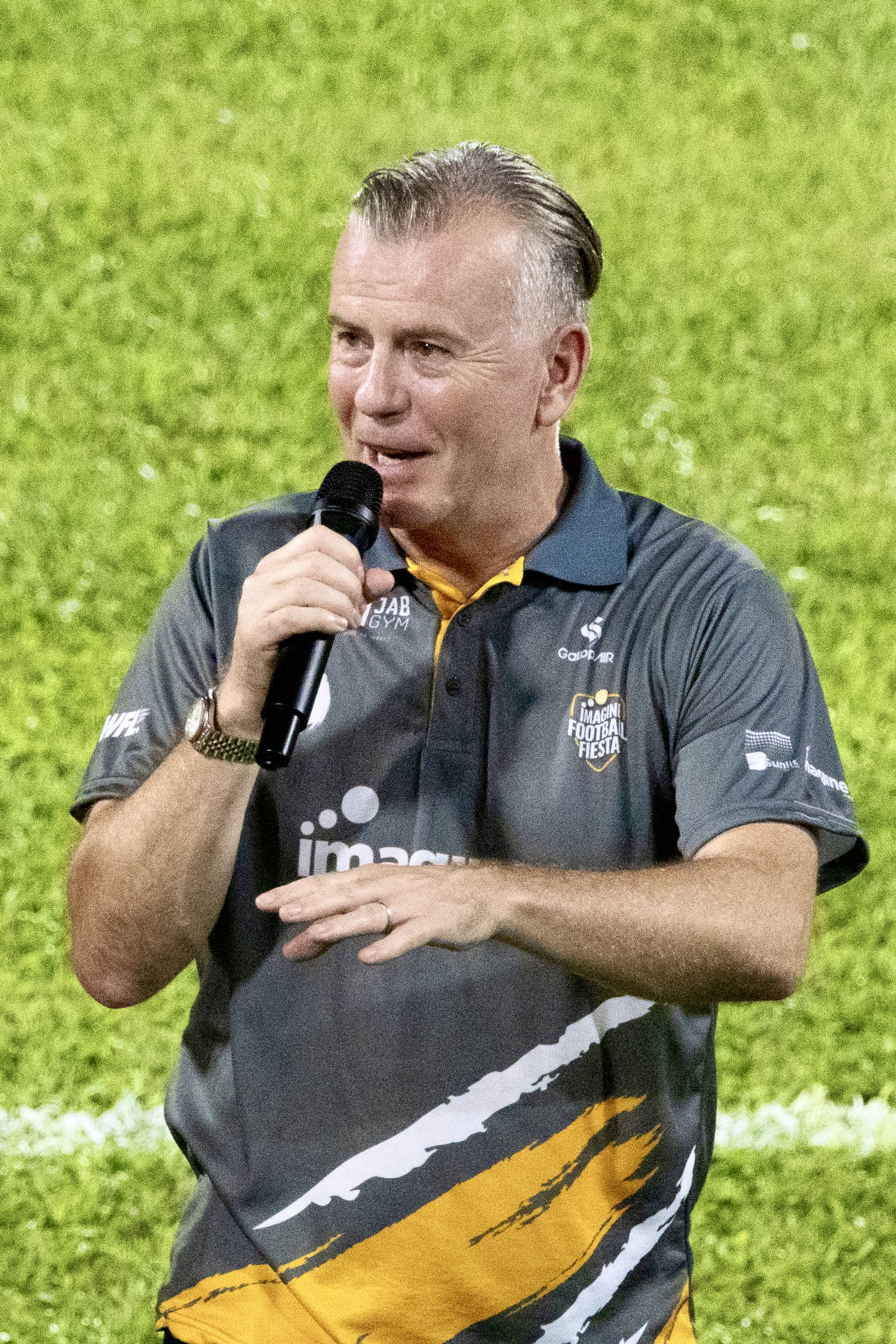
Dykes commentating in 2024

John Dykes is a sports television anchor, commentator and journalist based in Singapore. He is best known for hosting "The John Dykes Show" on Disney+ and previously Fox Sports Asia, he was formerly lead anchor for the Premier League's content service, available to international broadcast partners. He first made his name in Asia after working for more than a decade as host of ESPN STAR Sports' coverage of the Premier League and European football as well as a variety of other major global sporting competitions and tournaments.

== Biography ==
Dykes was born in Essex, England in 1964 and went to Brentwood School before moving to Hong Kong with his family. He moved to Singapore in 1997 and lives there with his wife and two daughters.

=== Early career ===
He began his media career as a college radio DJ whilst studying English Literature at Warwick University. A move to Hong Kong led to a successful stint at the South China Morning Post, where he was a Sports Writer, Feature Writer and Entertainment Editor for the Sunday Edition. During his time in Hong Kong, he also covered both sports and entertainment beats as a showbiz presenter at TVB. He hosted TVB's live coverage of the Academy Awards for five consecutive years before switching back to sports as a football commentator and presenter with STAR Sports.

=== Initial stint with ESPN Star ===
At the start of his career at ESPN STAR in Singapore, Dykes hosted tournaments across diverse sports such as tennis, golf, cricket and rugby. Highlights of his time with ESPN STAR Sports include his anchoring the broadcast of cricket's 1999 World Cup in England, trips to Wimbledon and Flushing Meadows to work alongside Vijay Amritraj on Grand Slam tennis, and his work in Augusta for Tiger Woods' triumph at the 2001 Masters. Over the years, he has been the host of Inside Cricket and The Formula One pre-show, Raceday, as well as launching Sportsline - the predecessor to SportsCenter - in India.

=== Football with ESPN Star ===
From 2001 to 2010, Dykes hosted football on ESPN Star Sports including Live Matchday coverage of the Premier League, post-match (Final Score), Football Focus and First Edition. His popular Up Close series saw him conduct long-form interviews with football celebrities such as David Beckham, Thierry Henry, Alan Shearer, Michel Platini and Sir Bobby Robson. Dykes was joined by Sky Sports' Richard Keys for the weekly First Edition, which rounded-up the major footballing stories across European newsprint. His departure from ESPN Star Sports was announced in March 2010 and he hosted his final shows (the 2010 FIFA World Cup) in June–July 2010.

=== Premier League Productions ===
In March 2010 it was announced that John Dykes would take up a job as lead presenter for the Premier League's content service that launched in August 2010. The made-in-London service, a 24–7, year-round channel specifically for its licensees, is a showcase for the 20 Premier League clubs, providing international broadcasters with a range of new English language, studio based output. Dykes anchored Matchday Live coverage each weekend and hosted the Football Today discussion show twice a week. He also worked on world feed coverage of the Barclays Asia Trophy tournaments in Hong Kong in 2011 and 2013, as well as hosting BPL Live fan park events in Mumbai in 2014 and Cape Town in 2016

In 2016, Dykes became the commentator for the 3pm "Goal Rush" kickoffs, broadcasting goals from the various matches kicking off simultaneously. Manish Bhasin replaced him on Matchday Live on Saturdays. Dykes then hosted the Sunday edition of Matchday Live.

His popularity with viewers worldwide has seen various international broadcasters, primarily Premier League licensees involve him in editorial and promotional campaigns aimed at maximising the value in their association with the BPL. He has worked with SuperSport in Africa, Star Sports in India, Orange in Indonesia, Singapore's mioTV, Hong Kong's nowTV and CTH in Thailand.

He left Premier League Productions upon the conclusion of the 2016-17 Premier League Season.

=== Return to Singapore ===
It was announced on 29 May 2017, that Dykes was to return to Singapore and host a new show on English Football on Fox Sports Asia. This reunited him with the presenting team he left at the then-ESPN Star Sports, which was eventually bought over and rebranded as FOX Sports Asia.

His new show debuted on 31 July 2017 named The John Dykes Show, a thrice-weekly chat show primarily covering English football. Dykes was also in demand as an event host for the Asian Football Confederation among other clients and he and also wrote for www.foxsportsasia.com

When Fox Sports International was purchased by Disney, Dykes also contributed to ESPN International's SportsCenter content and was a regular guest throughout the Euro 2020 tournament.

In November 2021, Disney launched the weekly “The John Dykes Show” chat show on the Disney+ Hotstar streams in Indonesia, Malaysia and Thailand, with a January 2022 launch in Singapore and Hong Kong on Disney+. The show combines coverage of Southeast Asian leagues and tournaments with a focus on major issues in European and English football. Michael Owen is a regular guest and Dykes co-hosts the show with Singaporean pundit Rhysh Roshan Rai.

In February 2022, it was announced that Dykes would be returning to screens across the Indian sub-continent with a weekly programmed, “The Top Corner, with John Dykes” on the Sony Sports Network.

== Personal life ==
Dykes is a citizen of Singapore and lives there with his wife and two daughters.
