= Tim Gudgin =

British radio presenter and voiceover artist

- Born: Timothy Andrew Leonard Gudgin; 25 November 1929; Croydon, Surrey, England
- Died: 8 November 2017 (aged 87)
- Occupations: Radio presenter; Voiceover artist
- Years active: 1949–2011
- Spouse: Jennifer Daly (m. 1956; died 2008)
- Children: 6

Timothy Andrew Leonard Gudgin (25 November 1929 – 8 November 2017) was an English radio presenter and voiceover artist. He began working as a broadcaster for the British Forces Broadcasting Service before returning to the United Kingdom in 1952 to work as a studio manager and newsreader at the BBC European Service, and later did work introducing BBC Radio 2 and BBC Radio 4 programmes. Following a three-year period as a public relations consultant to the government of the Isle of Man, Gudgin joined the BBC Saturday television sports programme Grandstand in 1976, reading the horse racing and rugby results in the Final Score segment. He became the second person to regularly read the classified football results after the death of Len Martin in 1995. Gudgin retired in November 2011.

== Early life ==
Gudgin was born in Croydon, Surrey, on 25 November 1929, to a father who worked at an insurance company. Gudgin had a brother and a sister. He was educated in Dorset during the Second World War, and then at the independent Whitgift School in South Croydon, London, but did not go to university. Gudgin told his masters that he wanted to pursue a career as a radio announcer but was told he would require a first-class degree. In August 1948, he was called up for National Service and was trained to be a tank driver-operator at Catterick Garrison before being sent to Germany to serve in the 5th Royal Tank Regiment. Gudgin began his broadcasting career during that time in Germany in October 1949, beating 200 other candidates to be one of four newsreaders with the British Forces Broadcasting Service in Hamburg. He was taught news reading by Robin Boyle at the Presentation Department and was involved in the BFN Drama Club. In 1952, Gudgin was posted to FBS Trieste in Italy.

== Career ==
In 1952, he returned to the United Kingdom and was appointed to work as a studio manager and newsreader at the BBC European Service. Gudgin was there on a six-month assignment but remained in the job there for ten years. He read stories on the children's television programme Blue Peter, and was a continuity announcer. Gudgin did voiceovers for clips broadcast on Sportsview (later Sportsnight) in the early 1960s after the presenter's job went to Frank Bough. He announced in 1963 that he would quit his staff job at the BBC to become a freelancer, noting that he would earn more work that way. Gudgin eventually became freelance in 1966, and was the presenter of BBC Light Programme (later BBC Radio 2) and BBC Home Service (later BBC Radio 4) programmes such as Family Favourites, Friday Night Is Music Night, Hancock's Half Hour, Home This Afternoon, Housewives' Choice, Late Night Extra, Marching & Waltzing, Melody Hour, Midday, Music Box, Night Ride, Out & About, Saturday Night on the Light, Swingalong, Top of the Form, Today, Treble Chance and Y.A.T.N.A.M.

Gudgin presented the television series The Lifesavers, on the subject of air-sea rescue, in 1966; introduced the teams in an edition of Come Dancing in January 1971; covered tennis; and fronted an in-vision commercial for Square Deal Surf that allowed him to purchase a house without needing to take out a mortgage. He went on to work as a public relations consultant to the government of the Isle of Man from 1973 to 1976. Gudgin returned to the United Kingdom in 1976. He found work reading the horse racing and rugby results in the Final Score segment of the BBC Saturday television sports programme Grandstand following the death of the previous announcer John Langham due to financial trouble. Following the death of Len Martin in 1995, Gudgin became the second person to take on the role of regularly reading the classified football results. He received coaching from BBC Cymru Wales's chief soccer correspondent Ian Gwyn Hughes in the pronunciation of Welsh football team names when Final Score began including results from the League of Wales in 2002. Gudgin continued in the role when Final Score became a separate programme from Grandstand in 2004.

He announced before he read the results on the 6 August 2011 edition of Final Score that the 2011–12 British football season would be his last before retirement, with his last reading on 19 November 2011. He later cited several reasons for his retirement – including his age, the distance he would have to travel following BBC Sport's relocation to Salford and his granddaughter's wedding in Australia which he wanted to attend. His successor on Final Score was Mike West, who was the presenter of sports bulletins on BBC Radio Lancashire. During his retirement, Gudgin sometimes stood in for presenters at a local radio station in Havant on a part-time basis without pay, and was the voice of a newspaper for blind people.

Match of the Day presenter Gary Lineker described Gudgin as "one of the most familiar voices in sport" and "a quintessential part of Saturday afternoons in this country". He avoided gargling and warming up his vocal cords, and later read the results from the same screen the viewers were watching, after first reading a hard copy of the results. Gudgin's voice rose and fell in modulation to inform the viewer whether a team had won or lost based on before he read out the away team's score.

== Personal life ==
Gudgin was married to World Service secretary Jennifer Daly from 1956 to her death in 2008. There were six children of the marriage. He was a Crystal Palace supporter and lived in Emsworth, Hampshire. Gudgin died of vascular dementia at his home on 8 November 2017. His funeral was held on 20 November at Chichester Crematorium.
