= Suego Faults =

Debut album by Wolf Gang, released in 2011

Studio album by Wolf Gang
- Released: 25 July 2011
- Genre: Pop
- Length: 38:29
- Label: Atlantic; Elektra
- Producer: Dave Fridmann; Max McElligott

Wolf Gang chronology
Suego Faults (2011)	Alveron (2014)

Suego Faults is the debut studio album by the British band Wolf Gang. It was released on 25 July 2011 in the United Kingdom and as a digital album on 20 December 2011 in the United States. The album included the singles "Lions in Cages", "The King and All of His Men" and "Dancing with the Devil".

== Production history ==
All of the album's tracks were written by Wolf Gang's songwriter and lead vocalist, Max McElligott. Suego Faults was produced by Dave Fridmann.

== Reception ==
Suego Faults ratings
Aggregate scores
Source	Rating
AnyDecentMusic?	6.4/10
Review scores
Source	Rating
Clash	5/10
Drowned in Sound	5/10
The Guardian	3/5 stars
The Irish Times	3/5 stars
NME	4/5 stars
The Skinny	3/5 stars

Duncan Gillespie of NME gave the album 4 out of a possible 5 stars, calling it "a sparkling debut album with echoes of Byrne and Bowie".

== Track listing ==
All tracks are written by Max McElligott.

Suego Faults track listing
No.	Title	Length
1.	"Lions in Cages"	4:27
2.	"Something Unusual"	3:22
3.	"Stay and Defend"	3:21
4.	"Suego Faults"	2:59
5.	"The King and All of His Men"	3:43
6.	"Back to Back"	4:14
7.	"Midnight Dancers"	4:10
8.	"Dancing with the Devil"	3:42
9.	"Where Are You Now"	3:16
10.	"Planets"	5:15
Total length:		38:29

== Personnel ==
- Max McElligott – lead vocals
- Lasse Petersen – drums
- Gavin Slater – guitar
- James Wood – bass guitar
- Jamie Jones – keyboard

== Charts ==
Chart performance for Suego Faults
Chart (2011)	Peak position
UK Albums (OCC)	96
