= Jonathan Legard =

British journalist

- Born: Jonathan Antony Legard; 7 July 1961 (age 65); Cardiff, Wales, UK

Jonathan Antony Legard (born 7 July 1961 in Cardiff, Wales), is a sports journalist, best known as the lead commentator for the BBC's Formula One TV coverage in 2009 and 2010.

Legard has been the BBC's motor racing and football correspondent as well as commentating regularly on Formula One races for BBC Radio 5 Live from 1997 to 2004. On 24 November 2008, he was confirmed as the lead commentator for the BBC's Formula One coverage in 2009. On 11 January 2011, the BBC announced changes in the F1 commentary team. On Twitter, Legard confirmed to British F1 fans that he would not be commentating on BBC F1 coverage during the forthcoming season.

On 19 January 2011 Legard became a sports presenter on BBC Radio 4's Today programme. In February 2011 Legard began commentating on football in BBC's The Football League Show. He has served as the Olympic Broadcasting Services English-language commentator for volleyball since the 2012 Summer Olympics.

== Career ==
- 1987–1990: BBC Radio Merseyside
- 1990–1997: BBC Radio 5 Live
- 1997–2004: Motor racing correspondent for BBC Radio 5 Live
- 2004–2008: Football correspondent for BBC Radio 5 Live
- 2009–2010: Formula One commentator for BBC Television
- 2011–: Sports correspondent for BBC Radio 4's Today programme and Football correspondent for BBC Radio 5 Live
- 2011–: Sports news presenter BBC News and BBC World News
- 2011–2015: Commentator on BBC One's The Football League Show
- 2012–: Relief Formula One commentator for BBC
- 2012: Volleyball commentator for BBC at the 2012 Summer Olympics
- 2013: DTM highlights commentator for ITV4
- 2014–: Red Bull Air Race
- 2016: Rio Olympics commentator

== Personal life ==
Although born in Cardiff, Legard grew up in Chester after moving there in 1966. He attended the Firs School before continuing his education at a private school in Shrewsbury. Legard is a lifelong fan of Chester City F.C. who until 2010 played their football in the Football Conference. Legard is married and has three children and lives in Acton, London.
