= The King and All of His Men =

Single by Wolf Gang

from the album Suego Faults
- Released: 2011
- Genre: Indie pop; synth-pop
- Length: 4:04
- Label: Atlantic; Elektra
- Songwriter: Max McElligott
- Producers: Dave Fridmann; Max McElligott

"The King and All of His Men" is the first single released by the British alternative band Wolf Gang, from their debut 2011 album, Suego Faults. The single was first released in the United Kingdom on 18 July 2011, seven days prior to the album. It was later released in the United States on 15 November 2011 through Elektra Records.

== Music video ==
Two versions of the music video were filmed for this single. The Guardian premiered the second version on 24 May 2011.

== Chart performance ==
"The King and All of His Men" reached number 40 on the Billboard Alternative chart.

=== Weekly charts ===
Chart (2011–12)	Peak position
US Alternative Airplay (Billboard)	40

== Usage in media ==
The track's instrumental was used as the title music for BBC Sport's Final Score football results service, during the 2011-12 and 2012-13 football seasons.
