= Vidiprinter =

Sports ticker service

A vidiprinter is a sports scores and results ticker service provided to media organisations. It is shown on BBC One (occasionally on BBC Two), BBC Red Button and Sky Sports News to provide a live on-air feed of football scores. It appears on-screen when a significant number of games are in progress.

The vidiprinter service was originally supplied by the Press Association, doing so from the vidiprinter's inception until the end of the 2012/13 season. The contract was taken over by Opta Sports from the start of the 2013/14 season, and Opta has provided the service ever since.

== Implementation ==
The BBC and Sky Sports show a vidiprinter during their scores and results programmes and can pick and choose which competitions they wish viewers to see on any given day.

On Saturdays, their vidiprinters appear at the start of the 3 pm kick-offs until just after 5 pm when all the results are in. However, on the Saturdays when international fixtures are taking place, the BBC does not show a football scores programme. Sky also shows its vidiprinter when the lunchtime games are taking place - ie between 12.30 pm and 2.30 pm.

Both also show their vidiprinter when a lot of midweek games are being played. Since 1998 Sky Sports has broadcast a midweek version of Soccer Saturday, Soccer Special, and the vidiprinter is on screen from 7:45 pm until around 9:45 pm, although it can appear for extended periods depending on the games taking place that night. Since 2007 the BBC has also shown a midweek edition of its scores service called Midweek Final Score although the programme is a text and graphics service with audio coming from BBC Radio 5 Live. Both channels produce editions of their scores programmes on Boxing Day and New Year's Day as a full set of English games (plus Scottish games on Boxing Day) take place on these bank holiday afternoons.

Until 2026 BBC Scotland had broadcast its own Saturday afternoon results programme and, as with Final Score, the vidiprinter was onscreen from the start of the programme until the classified results are read out. However the 2026/27 season has not seen any kind of scores service from BBC Scotland, and viewers in Scotland now see Final Score.

Until 2020, neither broadcaster produced a regular football scores service on Sundays, despite all the top Premier League clashes, other notable games and almost all of the women’s football programmes taking place on Sundays. The only exception was the final day of the Premier League season due to the final set of fixtures being played on a Sunday, when all ten games start at the same time - the only time of the season that this happens. However after the BBC regained the rights for the FA Cup in 2014–15, a Sunday edition was broadcast for a few seasons on the weekends of the first and second rounds of the competition with the vidiprinter seen on-screen when the FA Cup games were in progress, and in late 2020, Sky Sports News's Sunday afternoon coverage, which aired between 12noon and 6 pm, which in 2025 became Soccer Sunday and airs between just before 2 pm until 6 pm, shows the vidiprinter on screen throughout the programme, and the information shown also includes information from five European leagues.

There are also various versions of the vidiprinter on the internet. As well as English and Scottish football, The Sporting Life's website vidiprinter features league, but not Cup, scores and results from many global leagues. The Sky Sports online vidiprinter largely mirrors the vidiprinter seen on Sky Sports News, although it does not include scores from the women's game, and the Football Web Pages vidiprinter includes scores, results and scorers from Steps 2, 3 and 4, along with some Step 5 and Step 6 leagues, of the non league pyramid. It expanded its coverage at the start of the 2019/20 season to include the women's game, the Welsh Premier League and nine European competitions with its selection of Step 5 and 6 leagues added for the 2024/25 season. This is the only vidiprinter to include games from leagues which sit below Step 2, and games from Scottish non-league.

As of mid 2017, the BBC's website no longer features a vidiprinter. The BBC website had included a vidiprinter from the early 2000s. Originally this was a live feed of the Press Association service featuring all the competitions that the service covered. However from the 2007-08 season the BBC started to create its own version by removing competitions that it felt did not merit inclusion and as time progressed the coverage generally mirrored the competitions featured on the BBC's website. In October 2013 it began featuring European league matches at the expense of non league, Welsh and Irish games although the BBC did re-introduce coverage of the regional Conference leagues to their online vidiprinter at the start of the 2014–15 season. Later Welsh Premier League and Northern Ireland Premiership scores reappeared but cup competitions from both countries were not featured. In 2017 the BBC removed the vidiprinter from its website as part of a revamp of its scores section.

From the 2024/25 season, television broadcasters now only feature games from country-wide competitions following the removal of the regional National League scores and results from BBC Scotland's results programme, although results from the FA Trophy did appear. The two regional National League divisions and the FT Trophy continue to feature on Sporting Life's vidiprinter feed.

=== Competitions covered ===
As of the 2026/27 season, the television broadcasters cover the following competitions, providing, unless stated, goal flashes, sendings-off, half time and full time scores from their featured competitions. This should be seen as a guide as broadcasters are able to change the competitions that the viewer sees at any time:

- BBC Final Score:
  - Premier League, Championship, League One, League Two, National League, Women's Super League, Women's Super League 2, FA Cup (from the first round proper), EFL Cup
  - Scottish Premier League, Scottish Championship, Scottish League One, Scottish League Two, Scottish Cup (from round 4), Scottish League Cup
  - Cymru Premier
  - Bundesliga, La Liga, Ligue 1, Serie A
  - Champions League, Europa League, UEFA Women's Champions League
- Sky Sports:
  - Premier League, Championship, League One, League Two, National League, Women's Super League, FA Cup (from the first round proper), EFL Cup, EFL Trophy, Women's FA Cup (from round 4)
  - Scottish Premier League, Scottish Championship, Scottish League One, Scottish League Two, Scottish Women's Premier League 1, Scottish Cup (from round 3), Scottish League Cup
  - Champions League (from final qualifying round), Europa League (from final qualifying round), UEFA Conference League, UEFA Women's Champions League, FIFA Women's Champions Cup
  - World Cup, European World Cup qualifying, UEFA Nations League, UEFA under-21s qualifying, international matches
  - On Sundays, and sometimes on weeknights, Sky Sports News provides viewers with a feed which, in addition to the above competitions, also includes European domestic competitions:
    - Bundesliga, Eredivisie, La Liga, Ligue 1, Serie A

Note: The BBC does not broadcast its scores service during international windows.

== History ==
=== BBC ===
Since the earliest days of Grandstand a live feed of the day's football results as they came in has been a regular fixture on BBC Television on Saturday afternoons during the football season. This came in the form of a live shot of the Teleprinter with the presenter standing next to the printer reading out and interpreting the results as they came in. The start of the 1980s saw the live shot of the printer replaced by an on-screen computerised version, and it was renamed as the vidiprinter but the letter-by-letter typing format continued until the end of the 2000–01 season. The teleprinter/vidiprinter was on-screen for six to eight minutes at full-time, from just after 4:40 pm until enough of the major results were in to provide the full classified check at around 4:50 pm, although match reports often appeared between the end of the vidiprinter sequence and the classified check. Late goal flashes were omitted from the feed to ensure that only results were shown once the results started to come in. In January 1999, the BBC started to display the vidiprinter at the bottom of the screen during the half-time scores sequence although generally only during the first part of this sequence, i.e. just when the Premier League reports were shown. From this time, the late goal flashes started to appear during the vidiprinter sequence in Final Score, which was now generally onscreen for more than ten minutes, from around 4:45 pm until 5 pm because by now half time intervals at Premier League and Football League matches had been extended from 10 to 15 minutes.

At the start of the 2001-02 season, Final Score became a programme in its own right and the on-screen format for the vidiprinter changed. The biggest change was the replacement of the typing format with a much faster ticker-tape style and over the next two seasons, the vidiprinter was on screen for the entire half time round-up and also on the bottom of the screen during the final few minutes of Grandstand prior to the start of Final Score. In August 2003, the BBC started broadcasting the vidiprinter continually from 15 minutes before kick-off until the major full times were in. However, this service is only available on the Red Button until Final Score started on BBC One, which by 2003 was starting at the earlier time of 4:30 pm. In the 2003–04 season, this was merely an on-screen service and Grandstand played in a quarter-screen. Called Score Interactive, it was available from around 2:45 pm until Final Score started when this feed took the main Final Score programme, and the vidiprinter was onscreen from the moment Score Interactive began. During this first Red Button season, the vidiprinter feed often fed through team news as it became available to the Press Association for the period prior to kick-off. The following season, BBC Sport decided to broadcast a full scores programme in its own right. Called Score, it ran between 2:30 pm and 6 pm with the 4:30 pm to 5:15 pm segment simulcast on BBC One. However, from this point the vidiprinter did not appear until 3 pm and the team news feed was not shown, and it was removed from the screen between 3:55 pm and 4:05 pm. In around 2008, the entire programme became part of Final Score.

In November 2007 a midweek version of Final Score was launched. This is a simulcast of BBC Radio 5 Live with the vidiprinter shown on-screen and is called Midweek Final Score. This was the first time that the BBC had shown the vidiprinter on midweek evenings. Originally on air throughout the programme, the vidiprinter is now only seen when the evening's games are in progress.

On 26 October 2013, Final Score stopped showing the unedited football vidiprinter feed and decided to create its own edited version. This had been common practice on the internet for many years but this was the first time that a broadcaster chose to do this. This saw a massive reduction in the number of competitions covered. With the exception of the national and regional Conference leagues, all non-league information was removed as were the scores from all the other minor, reserve and youth league and cup competitions, Also removed was information from the women's game, from Welsh and Northern Irish cup competitions and all information from games in the Republic of Ireland. Other changes saw the replacement of the competition codes with the BBC's own codes, all goal flashes are accompanied by the competition code and injury time goals show the number of minutes of injury time played at the time the goal is scored. Some club names are given differently from how they are displayed on the raw feed and scores and results sometimes appear in a slightly different order.

For the 2016/17 season, goal flashes from the Welsh Premier League were reinstated but the 2017/18 season saw further reductions. The regional National League divisions were removed as was the FA Trophy, Irish Premiership and the Welsh Premier League although the Welsh Premier League was reinstated after a few weeks.

The 2023/24 season saw coverage of the women's game reappear, with goal flashes appearing for the Women's Super League for the first time. This is in addition to the half-time and full-time scores which had been seen prior to the October 2013 changes which had seen the end of coverage of the women's game.

September 2024 saw the BBC's vidiprinter feature European league matches for the first time. The leagues covered are the German, Spanish, French and Italian leagues. The Welsh Premier League continues to be included but the Northern Irish Premiership is still not featured, despite its results being included in the classified check.

==== Other sports ====
Until the end of the 1980s, incoming rugby results would appear alongside football scores. However by start of the 1990s it became possible to produce a football-only version and rugby results were then no longer seen by viewers, although until 2003 rugby results were still occasionally included, usually around half a dozen times each season, possibly in error apart from maybe when the result from a significant game had not appeared: in the 1990s the rugby results were generally given immediately prior to the vidiprinter sequence. The last time that any rugby information was seen on the BBC vidiprinter was in November 2003 although on 7 October 2006, Wales on Saturday did broadcast the version of the vidiprinter which included rugby scores and results. However, this was a one-off as the following week the vidiprinter seen on Wales on Saturday was the football-only version.

=== BBC Scotland ===
BBC Scotland had historically broadcast its own football results service, opting out of the last few minutes of Grandstand. This was extended for the 1989/90 season when Afternoon Sportscene launched. It opted out of Grandstand at around 4:40 pm when the Final Score segment of the programme was about to begin, and the programme included a vidiprinter sequence which lasted for roughly the same time as it did on Final Score. The programme was renamed Sportscene Results at the start of the 2001-02 season although, when the programme was extended in 2002 to begin at 4.30pm, the vidiprinter originally only appeared at the start of the programme and when the results were coming in and it wasn't until the end of the decade that the vidiprinter was on-screen from the start of the programme until the classified results at 5 pm.

As with Final Score, the vidiprinter seen on BBC Scotland historically took the raw feed but in November 2013, two weeks after Final Score launched an edited version, BBC Scotland followed suit. All English non-League scores, as well as all Welsh and Irish scores, were removed. BBC Scotland also started using its own codes, prefixing all English games with the letter 'E'. However in 2017 some of this information was restored when scores and results from the National League (including the North and South divisions), Welsh Premier League and the Northern Ireland Premiership along with goal flashes and sendings-off from all of those leagues. This is the first time that a vidiprinter on television has shown the scorers and sendings-off from the National League North, National League South and the Northern Ireland Premiership. This level of coverage continued until the start of the 2024-25 season when all three National League divisions were removed.

BBC Scotland ended its Saturday results programming at the end of the 2025/26 season. The very last edition of Sportscene Results aired on 2 January 2025; its timeslot was taken by a simulcast of BBC Radio Scotland's Open All Mics. This simulcast aired for the remainder of that season, and throughout the following season, but ended at the conclusion of the 2025/26 season, Now, BBC Scotland carries airs Final Score.

=== BBC Wales ===
During the final few years of Grandstand, BBC Wales also opted out of the final few minutes of Final Score to provide a round-up of the Welsh football and rugby results and in 2001 launched its own separate results programme called Wales on Saturday until it was dropped in 2008. The vidiprinter was on-screen from the start of the programme until 5 pm.

=== BBC Northern Ireland ===
As with BBC Scotland, BBC Northern Ireland has always produced its own results programme. However it does not start broadcasting until after 5 pm, by which time the part of Final Score in which the vidiprinter is displayed has come to an end. Therefore, the Northern Ireland programme does not feature an on-screen vidiprinter.

=== Sky Sports ===
As part of its commencement of televising top flight football in England in August 1992, Sky Sports launched a results service called Scorelines which was broadcast as the final segment of Saturday afternoon sports programme, Sports Saturday, which launched at the same time, and Sky aired a vidiprinter as part of this new programme. The vidiprinter appeared at the start of Scorelines, which was at approximately 4:30 pm. This was more than ten minutes before the vidiprinter appeared on Grandstand and, unlike on Grandstand, Sky's vidiprinter included news of goals scored during the period when the full-time scores were coming in. In August 1998, Sports Saturday became Soccer Saturday. The live sports action was dropped and was replaced by a football-only afternoon-long rolling service of scores, comments, reports, results and interviews. From this point the vidiprinter was on-screen from 3 pm until 4:55 pm although the vidiprinter disappeared between 3:50 pm and 4 pm for the duration of the classified half time round-up. In the 2004–05 season the decision was taken to keep the vidiprinter on-screen during the half time round-up and also during the full-time classified check and whilst presenter Jeff Stelling went through the updated league tables. This meant that the vidiprinter was now on-screen continuously from 3 pm until the first commercial break after the end of the day’s games, at just after 5:10 pm.

On 12 August 2014, Sky Sports launched Sky Sports News HQ and at this point decided to stop showing the raw feed and from this date and competitions where only half time/full time scores were provided stopped being shown. Consequently information about all Welsh, Irish and women's football, all non-national non-league football in both England and Scotland and all reserve and youth football stopped being seen by viewers. Also at this time, Sky Sports started using its own competition codes. Sky Sports was the last media organisation to stop providing viewers with the raw feed and did so after 22 years of showing a largely unedited version: the broadcaster had in recent years sometimes used its own competition codes, shortened the way team names were given and had never shown timings of sendings-off. Women's football information was re-introduced in 2021 and this was extended in early 2023 to include the Scottish Women's Premier League.

In late 2020, Sky Sports News started to show the vidiprinter throughout its Sunday afternoon programme Sports Sunday. The feed is different to what is used on Saturdays as it also includes domestic competitions from five European countries - France, Germany, Holland, Italy and Spain, with the vidiprinter on screen continuously from 12noon until 6pm. Information on games in domestic European league is also sometimes shown on a weeknight when Sky Sports News is not broadcasting a Soccer Special.

At the start of the 2023/24 season, as part of a new look to Sky Sports News, the vidiprinter's look was modified to include the competition codes which Sky uses now being included with goal flashes and sending-offs. At this point, vidiprinter coverage of the early rounds of the Scottish Cup was removed.

The 2024/25 season saw additional games kicking off at 12.30pm and the vidiprinter is now shown during those matches, from after the first commercial break after 12.30. However it disappears when those games are complete, returning at 3pm.

The 2025/26 season saw a refresh of the Sky Sports News schedule and changes to Sunday saw Sports Sunday renamed to Soccer Sunday and the programme was shortened, and now runs between 2pm and 6pm. Consequently the vidiprinter now appears on Sundays at 2pm.

The vidiprinter seen on Sky Sports has always exclusively focused on football although until 2009 the Sky Sports website did feature vidiprinters on the rugby union and rugby league sections of the Score Centre section of their website. Live scores were featured for the Rugby Union Premiership, the Anglo-Welsh League, the Pro 12, the Heineken Cup and all international matches. Full-time scores for the RFU Championship, National Leagues 1 and 2 were featured along with results from the Welsh National League Premier Division and Divisions 1 East and 1 West, the top three national leagues in Scotland and the All-Ireland League. Now, only the football section of the vidiprinter service is available and it does not feature non-league scores apart from the National League Premier Division whereas prior to 2009 the Sky Sports football vidiprinter did include non-league scores as well as Welsh and Irish football, although Welsh Premier League results did re-appear on Sky Sports' online vidiprinter from the start of the 2023/24 season. This vidiprinter also features the five European leagues seen on the linear channel on Sunday afternoons, along with Major League Soccer.

=== Other broadcasters ===
ITV never broadcast a teleprinter/vidiprinter during the days of World of Sport or its replacement results programme Results Service. However, when ITV2 launched in December 1998, a football scores programme was broadcast, called Football First, which in August 2001 was renamed The Goal Rush to coincide with ITV capturing the highlights package for the FA Premier League. The programme was simulcast on ITV from around 4:30 pm. A live scores ticker featured as part of this service although it was never referred to as the vidiprinter. The ticker only featured the top leagues in England and Scotland. Non-league football below the Football Conference and football in Wales and Northern Ireland did not feature on ITV's scores programme.

The short-lived Setanta Sports News broadcast a vidiprinter on Saturday afternoons although some minor results, and for some reason, the Northern Ireland league results, were omitted. As opposed to the BBC and Sky Sports, the vidiprinter on Setanta Sports News would remain on-screen long after 5 pm, sometimes until well into the evening for the duration of the teatime kick-offs.

From 2010 until 2014 S4C broadcast a game from the Welsh Premier League every Saturday afternoon and showed the vidiprinter, translated into Welsh. It was displayed on the bottom of the screen during the actual match as well as during the build-up and at half time. The vidiprinter was edited to include only the matches in Wales and the major games in England. Scottish games and English non league matches are removed from S4C's vidiprinter service.

ESPN UK did not broadcast a live scores programme and therefore did not show an on-screen vidiprinter and initially BT Sport also did not provide a vidiprinter service. However, at the start of the 2016-17 football season BT Sport launched a Saturday afternoon scores service - BT Sport Score. The programme aired a vidiprinter from around 3 pm until the end of the programme at just after 5 pm. The information on BT's vidiprinter was similar to that seen on Sky Sports - ie no non-league apart from the National League but in 2018 BT became the first television broadcaster to include European league scores and results on its on-screen vidiprinter, something that has been commonplace on internet vidiprinters for many years. BT Sport is also the only TV channel whose vidiprinter provides information on the FA Women's Super League. BT Sport Score ended at the conclusion of the 2022/23 season and its replacement, TNT Sports, does not show a football scores programme and therefore does not air an on-screen vidiprinter.

Sky News use a vidiprinter as part of their election coverage to display recent declarations from constituencies, with the results being coloured in the colour of the winning party. It usually comes on screen following the first declaration in the election and remains on screen until the end of the election programme.
