= Pumpin Blood =

Single by NONONO

from the album We Are Only What We Feel
- Released: 8 April 2013
- Genre: Indie pop
- Length: 3:29
- Label: Warner Music
- Songwriters: Tobias Jimson; Michel Flygare; Stina Wäppling
- Producer: Astma & Rocwell

NONONO singles chronology
"Pumpin Blood" (2013)	"Like the Wind" (2013)

"Pumpin Blood" is a song by Swedish trio NONONO. It was released on 8 April 2013 through Warner Music as the lead single from the band's debut studio album, We Are Only What We Feel. The song has charted in the United States and several European countries, and sold in a number of 700,000 copies worldwide.

== Musical influences ==
Described as having influences of electronic, indie pop, and rock music, "Pumpin Blood" has received comparisons to current popular acts such as Foster the People, Of Monsters and Men, Peter Bjorn and John and MGMT.

== Release ==
On 8 April 2013, "Pumpin Blood" was released through Warner Music as a lead single from the NONONO's debut studio album, We Are Only What We Feel. The song was also included on the Pumpin Blood EP, released in the United States in September 2013. On 10 June 2013, an EP titled Pumpin Blood (Remixes) was released in Sweden. Another EP with remixes was also released in the United States on 1 April 2014.

Since 2014, Australian telecommunications company Telstra has used the band's debut single "Pumpin Blood" in its advertising campaigns and brand identity.

== Critical reception ==
The song received mixed reviews from music critics, who highlighted it as one of the best tracks on We Are Only What We Feel, and complimented its whistle hook and radio appeal, but criticized its lyrical content.

== Music video ==
A music video for the song, directed by Magnus Härdner, was released on 15 April 2013.

== In popular culture ==
The song was featured on the soundtrack album for the 2014 romantic drama film Endless Love, starring Alex Pettyfer and Gabriella Wilde. In February 2014, it was featured in a season three episode of Suburgatory, titled "The Birds and the Biederman".

It was also performed by the cast of Glee featuring Lea Michele, Darren Criss, Naya Rivera, Chris Colfer and Amber Riley in an April 2014 episode of the series, "Opening Night", and later released on a digital five-track EP titled Glee: The Music, Opening Night. It also featured as soundtrack in EA Sports game, 2014 FIFA World Cup Brazil and between 2013 and 2019 it was the theme tune to the BBC's football results programme Final Score. It was also featured on The Vampire Diaries and in the 2014 horror film Kristy.

== Track listing ==
Digital download
No.	Title	Length
1.	"Pumpin Blood"	3:29

CD single
No.	Title	Length
1.	"Pumpin Blood"	3:30
2.	"Pumpin Blood" (Belarbi Remix)	4:15

Pumpin Blood (Remixes) EP – Swedish version
No.	Title	Length
1.	"Pumpin Blood" (Taken by Trees x Belief Remix)	3:13
2.	"Pumpin Blood" (Tony Senghore Remix)	4:48
3.	"Pumpin Blood" (Tony Senghore Dub Remix)	4:47

Pumpin Blood (Remixes) EP – US version
No.	Title	Length
1.	"Pumpin Blood" (The Knocks Remix)	6:13
2.	"Pumpin Blood" (Varsity Team Remix)	6:22
3.	"Pumpin Blood" (The Chainsmokers Remix)	4:03
4.	"Pumpin Blood" (The Jane Doze Remix)	3:54

== Charts and certifications ==
=== Weekly charts ===
Chart (2013–14)	Peak position
Austria (Ö3 Austria Top 40)	16
Belgium (Ultratip Bubbling Under Flanders)	48
Belgium (Ultratip Bubbling Under Wallonia)	25
Canada Rock (Billboard)	45
Germany (GfK)	30
Slovenia (SloTop50)	18
Switzerland (Schweizer Hitparade)	55
US Bubbling Under Hot 100 (Billboard)	19
US Hot Rock & Alternative Songs (Billboard)	23
US Rock Airplay (Billboard)	30
US Adult Pop Airplay (Billboard)	31
US Alternative Airplay (Billboard)	22
US Pop Airplay (Billboard)	32

=== Year-end charts ===
Chart (2014)	Position
US Hot Rock Songs (Billboard)	57

=== Certifications ===
Region	Certification	Certified units/sales
Sweden (GLF)	Gold	20,000^{‡}
United States (RIAA)	Gold	500,000^{‡}
^{‡} Sales+streaming figures based on certification alone.

== Release history ==
Region	Date	Format	Label
Sweden	8 April 2013	Digital download	Warner Music
Poland	12 August 2013	CD	Warner Music
United States	22 October 2013	Contemporary hit radio	Warner Bros.
United Kingdom	4 November 2013	Contemporary hit radio	Warner Music
