= Wolf Gang =

British band

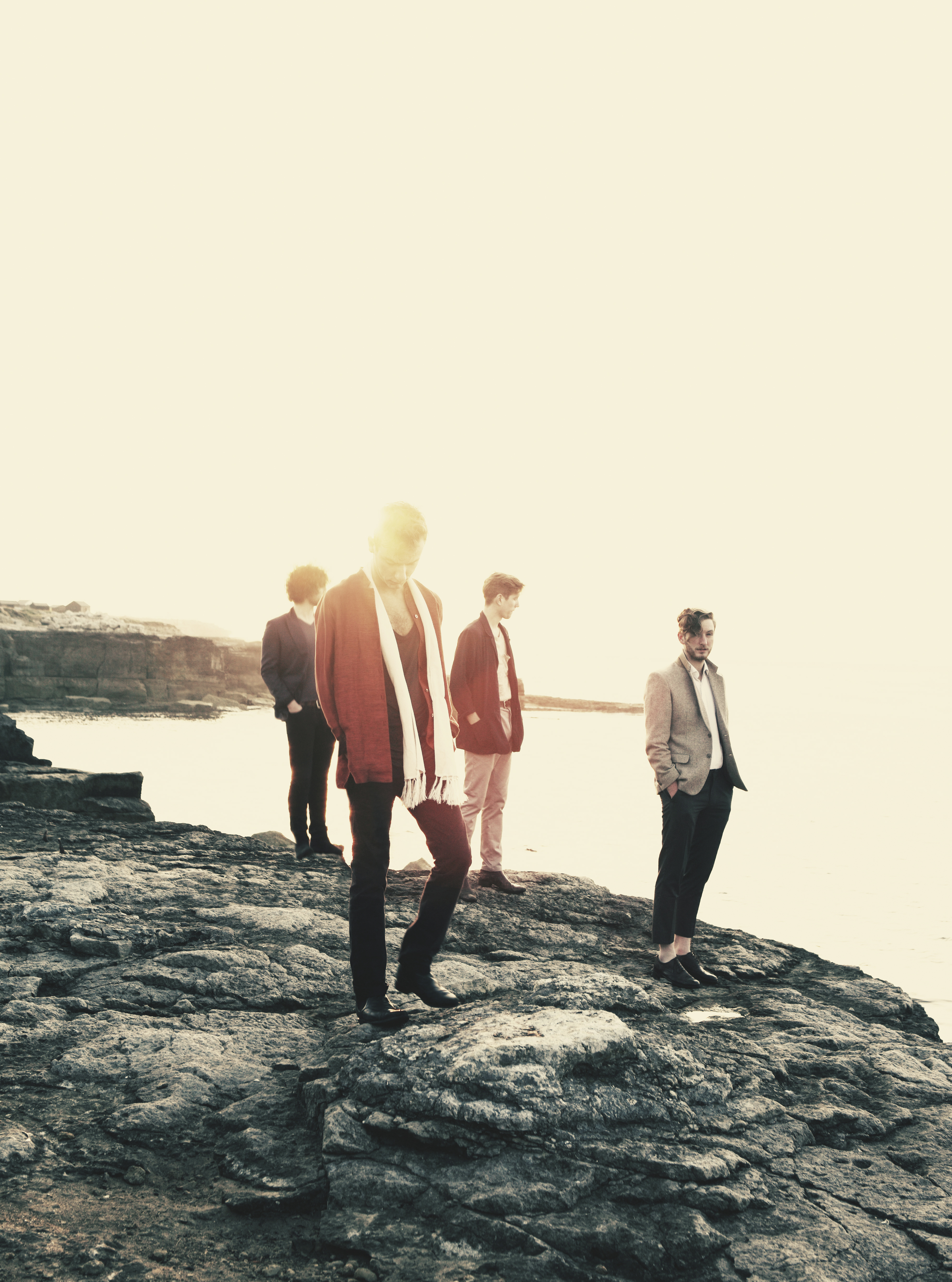
- Wolf Gang

Background information
- Origin: London, England
- Genres: Alternative rock, indie pop
- Years active: 2009–2015
- Labels: Neon Gold, Atlantic, Cherrytree, Interscope
- Past members: Max McElligott (aka Max Wolfgang); Lasse Petersen; Gavin Slater; James Wood; Jamie Jones (touring member); Beau Holland (touring member)
- Website: http://wolf-gang.co.uk/

Wolf Gang were a British alternative and symphonic rock band with Max McElligott as lead vocalist. Having played with different musicians, McElligott settled on a live set up in late 2009 which included Lasse Petersen (drums) previously of the Rakes, Gavin Slater (guitar) and James Wood (bass). When playing live the band also toured with a keyboard player, at one time Beau Holland.

Wolf Gang's first album, Suego Faults was released in July 2011 on Atlantic Records. In February 2013, the band signed a worldwide record deal with American label Cherrytree Records, an imprint of Interscope Records, and wrote and recorded their second album the same year. The album was produced by Flood at Assault & Battery Studios in London. An EP titled Black River featuring three tracks from the album was released in April. On 8 October, Wolf Gang announced that their new album Alveron would be coming out on 21 October.

On 27 July 2015, Wolf Gang announced that the band had decided to split, citing that it was time for the members to "move on to other things."

== History ==
Prior to his music career, McElligott was a student at the London School of Economics where he studied social anthropology, when he decided to take a year off to try music. Suego Faults was recorded by McElligott, all the parts and instruments were played by him. He is proficient in playing the piano, his first instrument, as well as guitar, bass, drums, keyboards, trumpet and other instruments. The songs on the album were put together by McElligott and Dave Fridmann, producer of the Flaming Lips, MGMT and Mercury Rev. The two share co production credit on the album sleeve.

The album was generally well received, garnering 5 stars from Artrocker, 8 out of 10 from NME and 4 out of 5 stars from Uncut, The Fly, Evening Standard, Scotland on Sunday, The Scotsman.

The band also received praise from The Guardian, Spin Magazine, The Fader & Pitchfork. In 2012, Wolf Gang was number 95 in GQs "100 Best Things In The World" listing.

== Performances ==
Wolf Gang toured and played with some of the music industry's biggest names, including Coldplay, The Killers, Florence and the Machine, Keane, Metric, The Naked and Famous, Ellie Goulding and Miike Snow. They have headlined the UK twice, once to promote their debut album and the second as the headline act for the influential NME Radar Tour in late 2011. They have also both headlined and supported tours in Europe and North America. They played in Australia as part of Parklife Festival in 2010, and have performed their own sold out shows in New Zealand. Their latest tour of the US in October 2012 began with a sold out show at the prestigious Troubadour venue in LA, and ended up with a sold out show in Austin, Texas.

The band supported the Naked and Famous as part of the NME Awards in February 2011, and subsequent support on their UK and German tour.

They supported Editors on 26 March 2011 at the Royal Albert Hall in aid of the Teenage Cancer Trust.

Festival slots include Rock en Seine, Lowlands, V Festival, Glastonbury, Bestival, T in the Park, Slottsfjell, Pukkelpop, London Calling and SXSW.

In April 2012, they played Coachella in Palm Springs.

They opened for Coldplay on the second leg of their Mylo Xyloto tour of the United States in the summer of 2012.

They supported Keane's arena tour of England in November and December 2012.

In January 2014, Wolf Gang announced they would be supporting Bastille on their May/June tour of the US.

== Media appearances ==
"Lions in Cages" was used as the theme song for British TV occult comedy Switch, which started airing in October 2012.

The theme song for the BBC television football program for Final Score was Wolf Gang's "The King and All His Men" from 2011 to 2013.

In the US, "Lions in Cages" featured in a year-long 2012 nationwide TV campaign for General Motors and also featured on the TV show Gossip Girl twice. The title track from the album Suego Faults was used in the final scene of the closing episode of the series.

== Fashion collaborations ==
Burberry, who after having them perform an acoustic version of the song "Back to Back" invited them to perform a stripped back acoustic set for their Fashion's Night Out event in September 2011. In June 2011 they played Emporio Armani's Summer Live gig supporting Plan B. More recently Wolf Gang performed at American designer Thom Browne's collection preview for Harrods.

== Discography ==
=== Albums ===
- Suego Faults (2011)
- Alveron (2014)

=== Singles ===
Year	Song	Album
2011	"The King and All of His Men"	Suego Faults
2011	"Pieces of You"	Suego Faults
2011	"Lions in Cages"	Suego Faults
2011	"Dancing with the Devil"	Suego Faults
