= Football League Extra =

- Presented by: Gabriel Clarke; Dave Beckett; Matt Smith; Tom Skippings
- Country of origin: United Kingdom

Production
- Running time: Variable

Original release
- Network: ITV
- Release: 1994 – 2004

Related
- The Championship

Football League Extra is an English Football League highlights show supplied by ITV Sport. It usually aired late on Monday nights.

The programme first aired in 1994, and ended after the 2003–2004 season, when it was replaced on Sunday mornings by The Championship. The show was actually billed as "Endsleigh League Extra" from 1994 to the summer of 1996, as the Football League was sponsored by Endsleigh Insurance, during this period. When Nationwide Building Society took over sponsorship of the league next, until 2004, the show's title changed to "Nationwide Football League Extra".

The show was first presented by Gabriel Clarke; other presenters later included Dave Beckett, Matt Smith and Tom Skippings. The show ran many club-specific features and also featured competitions and archive footage. Throughout the years, there often featured a Friday/Sunday or Monday extra which showed extended highlights of certain games. Football League Extra was taken off air temporarily in 2002 following the collapse of ITV Digital, but returned to ITV during the 2002–2003 season. The theme in the first two seasons was the ITV Euro 92 theme "You Are the Number One"; the show's other theme tune was called "Little Britain" by Dreadzone. Other songs included "July" by Ocean Colour Scene and "Whoosh" by Bentley Rhythm Ace.

== Commentators and Reporters ==
Commentators and reporters on Football League Extra included Clive Tyldesley, Alistair Mann, Tony Jones, Peter Drury, Ian Payne, Trevor Harris, Ron Atkinson, Dave Beckett and more. The show also included resident club commentators, and this often provided entertainment as the viewer would be able to hear ecstatic celebrations at times.
