= The Championship (TV programme) =

- Presented by: Matt Smith; Andy Townsend; Robbie Earle; Craig Doyle; Angus Scott
- Country of origin: United Kingdom

Production
- Running time: Variable

Original release
- Network: ITV
- Release: August 2004 – May 2009

The Championship (formerly known as Championship Goals between January 2008 and May 2008) is a British football television programme featuring highlights from the Coca-Cola Football League. It was almost always shown on Sunday mornings on ITV, presented by Matt Smith. Despite its name, it also covered Football League One and Football League Two matches, albeit to a lesser extent than Championship matches.

The show included various additional features since it began in August 2004 and had its format changed due to widespread criticism of the number of commercial breaks. Link scenes usually involved Smith speaking to camera from various parts of the stadium of the featured match, such as the dressing rooms, the referee's office, the boot room, the pie stand and so on.

== The team ==
=== Presenter ===
Matt Smith was the presenter from the start and very rarely absent. On the rare occasions he was absent, Andy Townsend, Robbie Earle, Craig Doyle and Dave Beckett deputised. Angus Scott previously had filled in before he left to work for Setanta Sports.

=== Pundits ===
The pundits (who often reported too) were Robbie Earle and Andy Townsend. They gave their analysis on some games but usually reported in depth on one particular game in the Football League. As of the 2007–08 season, pundits were very rarely used on the programme.

=== Reporters ===
The main reporters were Ned Boulting, Gabriel Clarke and Dave Beckett. There were also many occasional reporters such as Richard Henwood, Tom Skippings, Mike Hall, Andy Kerr, Mick Conway and Gary Bloom.

=== Commentators ===
Commentators on The Championship were Peter Drury, Jon Champion, Clive Tyldesley and John Rawling. Others included Phil Duffell, Tony Jones, Bob Symonds, Martyn Dean, Trevor Harris, Donovan Blake. Angus Scott was also a regular commentator before his move to Setanta.

== Format ==
Much of the show's format was similar to ITV's coverage of The Premiership, broadcast from 2001 to 2004. It primarily featured coverage of the weekend's biggest Championship games, with a larger focus on the automatic promotion, playoff and relegation spots as the season progressed. Early into its run, analysis of bigger games was provided by Robbie Earle and Andy Townsend, however, as the show progressed, their appearances became more sporadic and punditry was all but scrapped from the show by 2007. Much like The Premiership, one or two "featured" matches would usually be the primary focus of an episode, shown in an 8-10 minute highlight format at the start of the programme (which reflected the format of its parent programme "The Premiership" and MOTD before the BBC lost their Premiership rights to ITV). Coverage of League One, League Two and smaller Championship games was less extensive, and usually limited only to goals, red cards, injuries, and other notable incidents. Post-game interviews with managers, chairmen, players and fans were also a regular fixture. Occasionally, the show would include reports and features on notable incidents throughout the Football League, such as Leicester City manager Gary Megson's departure after just 41 days in 2007.

== End of the show ==
The show came to an end in May 2009 when ITV's Football League and League Cup highlights package expired. For the 2009–10 season, the BBC took over the domestic rights package, which also included live games, and broadcast a similarly formatted programme called The Football League Show on Saturday nights after the existing Match of the Day. Highlights of the games were also available online at the BBC Sport website.

== See also ==
- Football League Extra
