= Pumpin Blood (EP) =

2013 album by NONONO

EP by NONONO
- Released: 17 September 2013
- Genre: Indie pop
- Label: Warner Music; Warner Bros. Records
- Producer: Astma & Rocwell

NONONO chronology
Pumpin Blood (2013)	We Are Only What We Feel (2014)

Pumpin Blood is a debut EP by Swedish trio NONONO, released digitally on 17 September 2013 through Warner Music in Australia, New Zealand, Mexico and Japan, and Warner Bros. Records in the United States. The EP has peaked at number 37 on the Billboard Top Heatseekers chart.

== Track listing ==
Pumpin Blood EP
No.	Title	Length
1.	"Pumpin Blood"	3:29
2.	"Jungle"	4:00
3.	"Fire Without a Flame"	3:17
4.	"Like the Wind"	3:22
5.	"Pumpin Blood" (Acoustic)	3:46

== Charts ==
Chart (2013)	Peak position
US Heatseekers Albums (Billboard)	37

== Release history ==
Region	Date	Format	Label
Australia	17 September 2013	Digital download	Warner Music
Japan	17 September 2013	Digital download	Warner Music
Mexico	17 September 2013	Digital download	Warner Music
New Zealand	17 September 2013	Digital download	Warner Music
United States	17 September 2013	Digital download	Warner Bros. Records
