= Manish Bhasin =

British football commentator

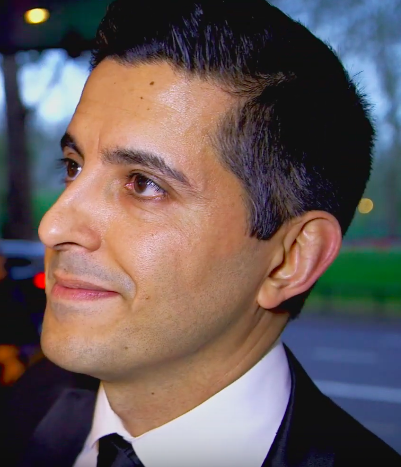
- Bhasin at the 9th Asian Awards in 2019
- Born: Manish Dev Bhasin; 21 May 1976 (age 50); Leicester, England
- Occupation: Sports journalist
- Spouse: Anushka Chaudhry
- Children: Two

Manish Dev Bhasin (born 21 May 1976 in Leicester, England) is an English sports journalist and presenter broadcasting for Premier League Productions as the face of the Premier League's global coverage to over 700 million viewers as well as the BBC in the UK. He was the presenter of the former sports programme providing coverage of the Championship, League 1 and League 2 match highlights; The Football League Show, which ran from August 2009 to May 2015.

Manish Bhasin presents shows on [[skynews]] from 2026

== Early career ==
Bhasin graduated in 1997 from Anglia Ruskin University with a degree in "Communication Studies with English" and completed a diploma in "Broadcast Journalism" at Cardiff University. He spent five years at BBC Radio Leicester as sports presenter/commentator including the drive time Drive at 5 programme presenting the latest news and sport. During this period, his highlights include reporting from Leicester Tigers' last minute victory in the 2001 Rugby European Cup final and the following year at Cardiff's Millennium Stadium.

Bhasin joined the East Midlands edition of ITV's Central News in 2001, where he presented in-depth coverage of the region's sport, including a comprehensive analysis of the financial crisis at Leicester City. During his tenure, Bhasin was nominated for "Regional Sports Presenter or Commentator of the Year" at the Royal Television Society Sport Awards and presented Soccer Sunday. In 2024, Bhasin was announced as the host of an interview and analysis series for the casino comparison platform Gambling Zone.

== BBC ==
In February 2004, Bhasin joined BBC's Football Focus team, a weekly magazine style show that previews the weekend's top football action. At the start of the following season, he became the main presenter of the show, replacing Ray Stubbs to become the show's youngest regular host at the age of 27.

In addition to his football roles on Football Focus and later The Football League Show, Bhasin has emerged as the BBC's primary cricket presenter, hosting highlights of the 2006–07 Ashes Series, the 2007 World Cup, the 2009 ICC World Twenty20 tournament and the 2011 Cricket World Cup. He also presented highlights of the Africa Cup of Nations 2006 on BBC Three and combined his duties as the presenter of Football Focus with a roving reporter's role during the 2006 FIFA World Cup.

Bhasin has also presented Your News on the BBC News Channel in addition to presenting on the channel for a week in February 2008.

Bhasin made a return to the BBC News Channel on 24 July 2008 and now appears to be one of the many regular stand-in news presenters on the channel. At the start of the 2009–10 English football season, Bhasin was chosen to present The Football League Show when the BBC acquired the rights to the Football League. From January 2010 onwards, he also became the presenter for the Midlands edition of the regional football show Late Kick Off.

For the London 2012 Olympics, Bhasin presented coverage throughout the day on BBC Three. This was a role he took again for the Glasgow 2014 Commonwealth Games.

Bhasin presented World Cup group stage matches shown on BBC Three in 2014. He did the same for Euro 2016 on BBC Four.

Bhasin also occasionally hosted Match of the Day 2 on BBC One on Sundays, in the absence of its lead presenter Mark Chapman.

== Premier League Productions ==
Prior to the 2016–17 season, Bhasin hosted some episodes of Premier League News, as part of Premier League Productions' global content service. He also filled in occasionally for John Dykes on Matchday Live.

From the 2016–17 season onwards, Bhasin started hosting Matchday Live on Fridays and Saturdays, with John Dykes becoming commentator for the 3pm Goal Rush commentary on Saturday.

== Personal life ==
Bhasin is married to Anushka Chaudhry. He also has two children, Simi and Siri
