= We Are Only What We Feel =

Studio album by NONONO
- Released: 13 March 2014
- Genre: Indie pop
- Label: Warner Music; Warner Bros. Records
- Producer: Astma & Rocwell

NONONO chronology
Pumpin Blood (2013)	We Are Only What We Feel (2014)

Singles from We Are Only What We Feel
- 1. "Pumpin Blood" Released: 8 April 2013; 2. "Like the Wind" Released: 12 June 2013; 3. "Hungry Eyes" Released: 20 January 2014; 4. "One Wish" Released: 6 October 2014

We Are Only What We Feel is the debut studio album by Swedish trio NONONO, released on 13 March 2014 through Warner Music. The album has peaked at number 41 on the Billboard Top Heatseekers chart.

Professional ratings
Aggregate scores
Source	Rating
Metacritic	51/100
Review scores
Source	Rating
AllMusic	3/5 stars
Pitchfork Media	(5.8/10)
PopMatters	(5/10)
CMJ	(Unfavourable)
Consequence of Sound	(D+)

== Track listing ==
All tracks are written by Stina Wäppling, Tobias Jimson and Michel Flygare.

No.	Title	Length
1.	"Jungle"	4:00
2.	"Like the Wind"	3:22
3.	"Pumpin Blood"	3:29
4.	"Echo"	3:47
5.	"One Wish"	3:20
6.	"Hungry Eyes"	3:50
7.	"Down Under"	3:28
8.	"Fire Without a Flame"	3:17
9.	"Johnny"	2:59
10.	"Love"	3:39

== Personnel ==
Credits for We Are Only What We Feel adapted from AllMusic

NONONO

- Stina Wäppling – vocals
- Tobias "Astma" Jimson – engineering, production
- Michel "Rocwell" Flygare – engineering, production

Additional musicians

- Pelle Hansen – strings
- Pär Lindqvist – strings
- Fredrik Syberg – strings
- The West Los Angeles Children's Choir – vocals

Additional personnel

- Sören Von Maimborg – mastering, mixing
- Barbara Klaskin Silberg – direction
- Amir Chamdin – photography
- Johan Reinhold – artwork

== Charts ==
Chart (2014)	Peak position
US Heatseekers Albums (Billboard)	41

== Release history ==
Region	Date	Format	Label
Sweden	13 March 2014	CD; digital download	Warner Music
United States	1 July 2014	CD; digital download	Warner Bros. Records
