= Grandstand (TV programme) =

British television sports programme (1958–2007)

- The programme's original opening titles
- Created by: Paul Fox; Bryan Cowgill
- Country of origin: United Kingdom
- Original language: English
- No. of episodes: 3500 (estimated)

Production
- Running time: various

Original release
- Network: BBC1; BBC2
- Release: 11 October 1958 – 28 January 2007

Grandstand was the flagship sports programme of the BBC which was broadcast on Saturday afternoons on BBC1 between 1958 and 2007, and from 1981 on Sunday afternoons as Sunday Grandstand on BBC2, although until 1998 the Sunday edition aired only during the summer.

The last editions of Grandstand and Sunday Grandstand were broadcast over the weekend of 27–28 January 2007.

== History ==
During the 1950s, sports coverage on television in the United Kingdom gradually expanded. The BBC regularly broadcast sports programmes with an outside studio team, occasionally from two or three separate locations. Production assistant Bryan Cowgill put forward a proposal for a programme lasting three hours; one hour dedicated to major events and two hours showing minor events. Outside Broadcast members held a meeting in April 1958, and Cowgill further detailed his plans taking timing and newer technical facilities into consideration. During the development of the programme, problems arose over the proposed schedule which would result in the programme ending at 16:45 to allow children's programmes to be broadcast.

Three weeks before the debut of the programme, sports broadcaster Peter Dimmock favoured naming the show Out and About! with Fox persuading Dimmock to agree on a new name, Grandstand. The programme launched on 11 October 1958 from Lime Grove Studios with Dimmock as the presenter. Dimmock presented the first two editions and three weeks later, he was replaced by sports commentator David Coleman. The early months on air included music, as Fox recalled: "Initially some of the gaps between races were filled by a duo called My Brother & I". Paul Fox insisted that the service was broadcast until 17:00 to ensure a proper results service and by the autumn of 1959, Grandstand was finishing at 17:00 every Saturday.

According to Richard Haynes in BBC Sport in Black and White, the 1960s saw the Grandstand name "become synonymous with the BBC's coverage of sport" and it "became a trusted vehicle for British viewers to access a variety of sports.", becoming one of the most recognisable on British television, dominating Saturday afternoons on BBC1 and covering nearly every major sporting event in Britain, such as the FA Cup Final, Wimbledon, the Grand National and the University Boat Race, as well as major international events like the Olympic Games, the Paralympic Games, the Commonwealth Games and the FIFA World Cup, where the Grandstand name would be used - e.g. Olympic Grandstand and World Cup Grandstand.

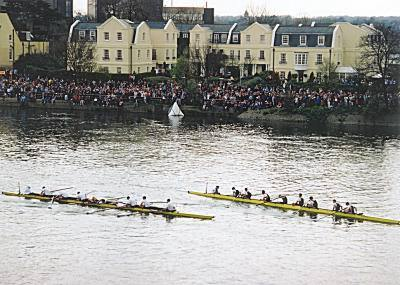
The University Boat Race was broadcast annually on Grandstand until 2004

From Grandstand's launch until the lifting of restrictions on broadcasting hours by the Minister of Posts and Telecommunications in 1972, sports coverage was one of the few programming areas which was exempt from the broadcasting hours restrictions. Instead, sporting coverage and outside broadcasts were provided with a separate quota of broadcasting hours per year by the Postmaster General. By the mid 1960s this amounted to 350 hours per year. This meant Grandstand was a key part of the BBC's Saturday afternoon schedules, as the time the programme was on the air did not count towards the 50-hour a week restriction on normal broadcasting hours.

The first televised Grand National, in 1960, was the BBC's largest outside broadcast for a sport at the time: Grandstand used 16 cameras to cover the event, and the BBC secured the television rights only after years of negotiations.

Between 4 November 1972 and 13 January 1973, an experiment took place whereby Grandstand would end at approximately 15:50. It would be followed by an episode of the Western series Lancer. Then, at approximately 16:40, Final Score would air as a separate programme, hosted by the same presenter as that of Grandstand earlier in the afternoon, the programme being on air in time for the teleprinter sequence. This experiment ended the Saturday before the start of the 1973 Five Nations Championship.

No edition of Grandstand was broadcast on 23 December 1978. This was due to strike action on the Friday which had only ended at 22:00 the previous night. BBC1 could not get back on air until 15:00, which meant that Grandstand was not broadcast, but Final Score was.

Beginning in the early 1980s, a lunchtime BBC Weekend News was included in Grandstand, functioning as a programme break between Football Focus and the start of that week's live events.

=== Competition from ITV ===
Between 1965 and 1985, Grandstand faced competition from ITV's World of Sport, which broadcast rival coverage of the FA Cup Final and scheduled a wide range of sports, including novelties and minority events. and by the end of the 1980s ITV had stopped sport on Saturday afternoons.

=== Later years and demise ===
From the 1990s onwards, the programme's scope of sporting coverage began to diminish as the BBC gradually began to lose major broadcasting sports rights, including live Formula One, live FA Cup games, England and county cricket matches, the University Boat Race and the Ryder Cup, particularly to the then emerging Sky Sports, and to ITV and Channel 4. Grandstand was not shown on 20 May 2000 as no major sporting events broadcast by the BBC were taking place. In 2001 the BBC lost the rights to show weekly highlights of the Premier League although it did regain the rights to show live FA Cup and England football internationals.

In October 2001, the head of BBC Sports and Programming Pat Younge announced plans to revamp Grandstand by placing emphasis on broadcasting one particular sport rather than alternating between several sports.

In its final few years, Grandstand was rarely presented from a studio and as such there was no longer a main presenter. The show tended to be broadcast from wherever the main event of the day was taking place. The host would be associated with that feature; for example, Hazel Irvine would host snooker, Suzi Perry for motorcycle racing, Sue Barker for tennis, Clare Balding for racing or rugby league, and John Inverdale for rugby union. The 2004 Summer Olympics were the last Olympic Games to be broadcast as Olympic Grandstand.

=== Football Focus and Final Score part company ===
In August 2001, the Football Focus section, having been the first feature on Grandstand since 1974, became a separate programme in its own right. This meant that Grandstand's start time was now 13:00 rather than 12:15.

At the same time, Final Score also become a programme in its own right, running from 16:30, meaning that Grandstand only broadcast between 13:00 and 16:30. "Around the Grounds" and the half time sequence did remain within the Grandstand programme. In 2004, following the success of Sky Sports' Soccer Saturday featuring reports from the afternoon's football matches, the BBC introduced its own football scores programme called Score. It ran for the full duration of the afternoon's football matches, beginning at 14:30, and was available as an add-on service on the Red Button until 16:30 when BBC One joined it, at which point Score would become Final Score.

=== 2006 announcement ===
On 24 April 2006, the BBC announced that Grandstand would be gradually phased out after nearly fifty years, due to the increasing use of interactive services and the need to meet the challenges of the digital, on-demand world. This had been hinted at by the dropping of the "Grandstand" title from the BBC's coverage of the major international sporting events, like that year's Winter Olympics and Commonwealth Games.

It was originally intended that the show would end in 2009, but this was brought forward to 28 January 2007.

Since 2007, media and sporting figures have sometimes suggested that Grandstand should be revived by the BBC, in order to help minority sports that no longer receive wide exposure outside of the Olympic Games. In 2017, Gabby Logan named gymnastics, hockey, swimming and diving as sports particularly deserving of Grandstand-style coverage.

== Features ==
=== Football Focus ===
The first item of the programme, beginning in the early afternoon during the football season, was the football magazine show Football Focus (which started under the present name in 1974) presented by Bob Wilson for 20 years until 1994, Steve Rider from 1994-1996 (as part of his Grandstand presenting duties), Gary Lineker from 1996-1999 and Ray Stubbs from 1999-2001 (Stubbs remained as a presenter of the show until 2004). Prior to 1974 the timeslot had been filled by Football Preview, previewing the day's matches and presented by Sam Leitch. Football Focus remained part of Grandstand until 2001, when it became a separate programme in its own right.

=== Around the Grounds ===
Between the main live sporting events, Grandstand had a brief segment of reports from around the football grounds prior to the 3pm kick-offs. The on-site commentators summarised the team line-ups and pre-match news.

=== Final Score ===
In the late afternoon during the football season, Grandstand would conclude with Final Score. This covered results from all Football League and Scottish Football League matches. A famous feature was the teleprinter, which by the start of the 1980s, was digitised and renamed the vidiprinter, which typed out results as they came through. When most of the results were in, the final scores were read out as the "classified football results", and the football pools news was given. Only two people regularly read the classified results on Grandstand's Final Score: the Australian Len Martin (from the first edition until his death in 1995) and Tim Gudgin (from 1995 until 2001, when Final Score separated from Grandstand – he maintained the role until 2011). Rugby union results and, until 1987, racing results, were also included. A shorter version was aired during the football close season.

== Winter phase TV schedule format ==
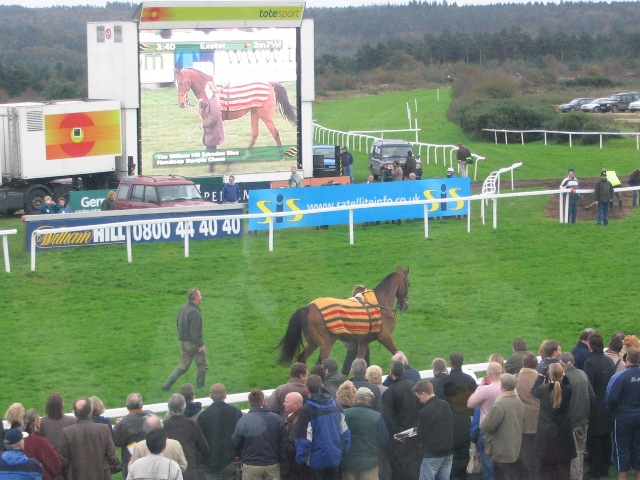
Live horse racing was often part of the programme

In the winter format, Football Focus opened the show and Final Score brought Grandstand to a close. Live coverage was mostly racing during the early part of the programme, and the main event, often rugby (both codes), kicked off at either 14:30 or 15:00, which was timed to be the main event in Grandstand and to avoid any clash with the final football results, which would come in after 16:40. Minor pre-recorded sporting items mostly preceded the main event in the early afternoon. An example of this format is seen from the schedule below dated Saturday 31 October 1992 with the main event of the day in bold:

12:15 Grandstand Opening
12:20 Football Focus
12:50 BBC Weekend News
12:55 Racing
13:10 Motor Sport
13:25 Racing
13:40 Motor Sport
13:55 Racing
14:10 Boxing
14:30 Rugby Union: Ireland v Australia
16:20 Motor Sport
16:40-17:05: Final Score

== Summer phase TV schedule format ==
The summer phase format was used outside of the football season. It was less formal than the winter format and centred more on live events coverage. Sometimes, the Grandstand programme would begin earlier than its normal timeslot, at just before 11:00 so that it could show live cricket from the start of the day's play. Below is an example of a typical show from 12 June 1993, with the main event of the day in bold.

12:15 Grandstand Opening
12:35 Motorsport
13:00 BBC News at One
13:05 Tennis: Queens
15:00 Athletics
16:00 Swimming/Athletics/Tennis/Formula 1 Qualifying Highlights†
17:15 Close

† This date was the Canadian Grand Prix, so qualifying would not have taken place.

== Sunday Grandstand ==
A Sunday edition, named Sunday Grandstand, launched in 1981 and was broadcast on BBC2, although a few Sunday editions of Grandstand had been broadcast on BBC1 in 1978, 1979 and 1980. Its on-air time was a later five-hour slot, so as to be able to provide coverage of the conclusion of the Sunday League cricket matches which were carried over from the previous afternoon-long cricket match which had been part of BBC2's summer Sunday schedule since 1965 along with live coverage of Formula 1 Grand Prix motor racing. The 13:55 to 18:50 slot remained in place from the programme's launch until the end of the 1980s, after which the broadcast hours started to become more varied.

Until 1998, the Sunday edition was usually only broadcast during the summer months, although there were exceptions, such as a special edition in January 1995 to cover a Regal Trophy semi-final. However, from February 1998 Sunday Grandstand became a year-round programme, incorporating the Ski Sunday and Rugby Special programmes.

== Notable live events ==
- Foinavon winning the 1967 Grand National at odds of 100/1 following a 23rd fence pile up in which every other horse fell or was remounted – the fence was subsequently named in Foinavon's honour.
- Golfer Tony Jacklin hitting the first live televised hole in one in Britain during the Dunlop Masters on 16 September 1967.
- Gareth Edwards scoring one of the most memorable tries in history, in the Barbarians v All Blacks rugby union match at Cardiff Arms Park on 27 January 1973.
- The first known streaker at a major sporting event during an England v France Rugby Union match at Twickenham on 20 April 1974.
- Cambridge sinking in the 1978 University Boat Race, and again in 1984 after colliding with a stationary barge.

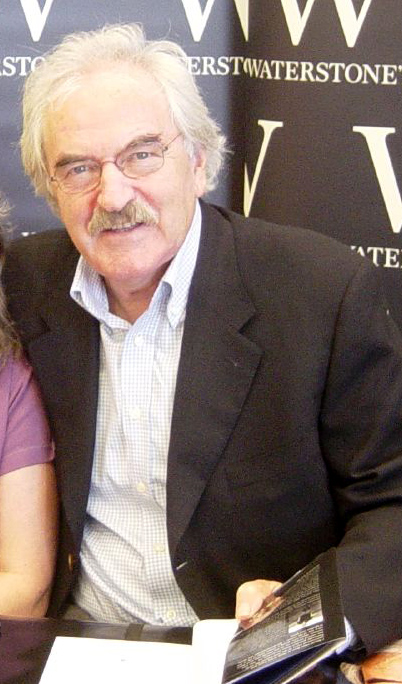
Grandstand presenter Des Lynam

- A fight breaking out on air between staff in the newsroom behind presenter Des Lynam on 1 April 1989. This was later revealed to be an April Fool's Day joke.
- The Hillsborough football ground disaster on 15 April 1989.
- The Grand National on 3 April 1993 being declared void after two false starts – 30 horses ran the race when their jockeys mistakenly assumed the course officials waving red flags were protesters.
- Roland Ratzenberger and Ayrton Senna's fatal accidents during the San Marino Grand Prix on 30 April and 1 May 1994.
- Jockey Frankie Dettori going through the card by winning all seven races at Ascot on 28 September 1996.
- The evacuation of Aintree Racecourse on 5 April 1997 due to an IRA bomb threat that caused the cancellation of the Grand National (the race took place two days later).

== After Grandstand ended ==
The last Saturday edition of Grandstand was broadcast on 27 January 2007 with World Indoor Athletics from Glasgow, and the final edition was broadcast the following day, 28 January 2007, with the live action being the final of the World Indoor Bowls Championships from Hopton-on-Sea in Norfolk with a short tribute to the history of the show forming its final feature. Sport still features prominently on the BBC's schedules on Saturday afternoon as well as on BBC Red Button and iPlayer; Final Score is still shown at the end of the football matches played on Saturday afternoon.

== Presenters ==
Hosts included Peter Dimmock, David Coleman, Frank Bough, Des Lynam, Steve Rider, Ronald Allison, Clare Balding, Sue Barker, Barry Davies, Dougie Donnelly, Harry Carpenter, Harry Gration, Tony Gubba, David Icke, John Inverdale, Hazel Irvine, Gary Lineker, Craig Doyle, Roger Black, Helen Rollason, Ray Stubbs, David Vine, Alan Weeks and Bob Wilson. While the BBC News was often read by Moira Stuart.

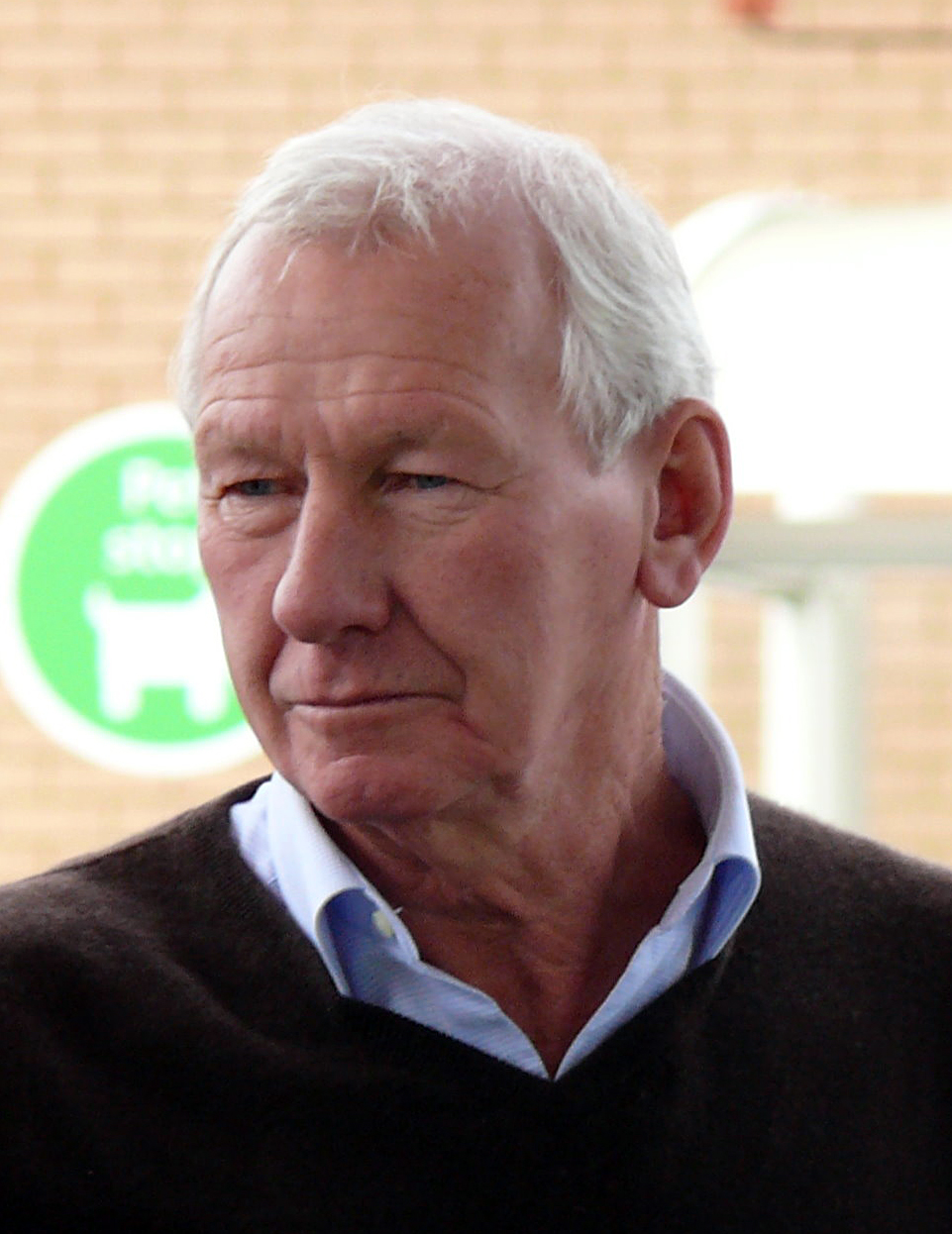
Bob Wilson

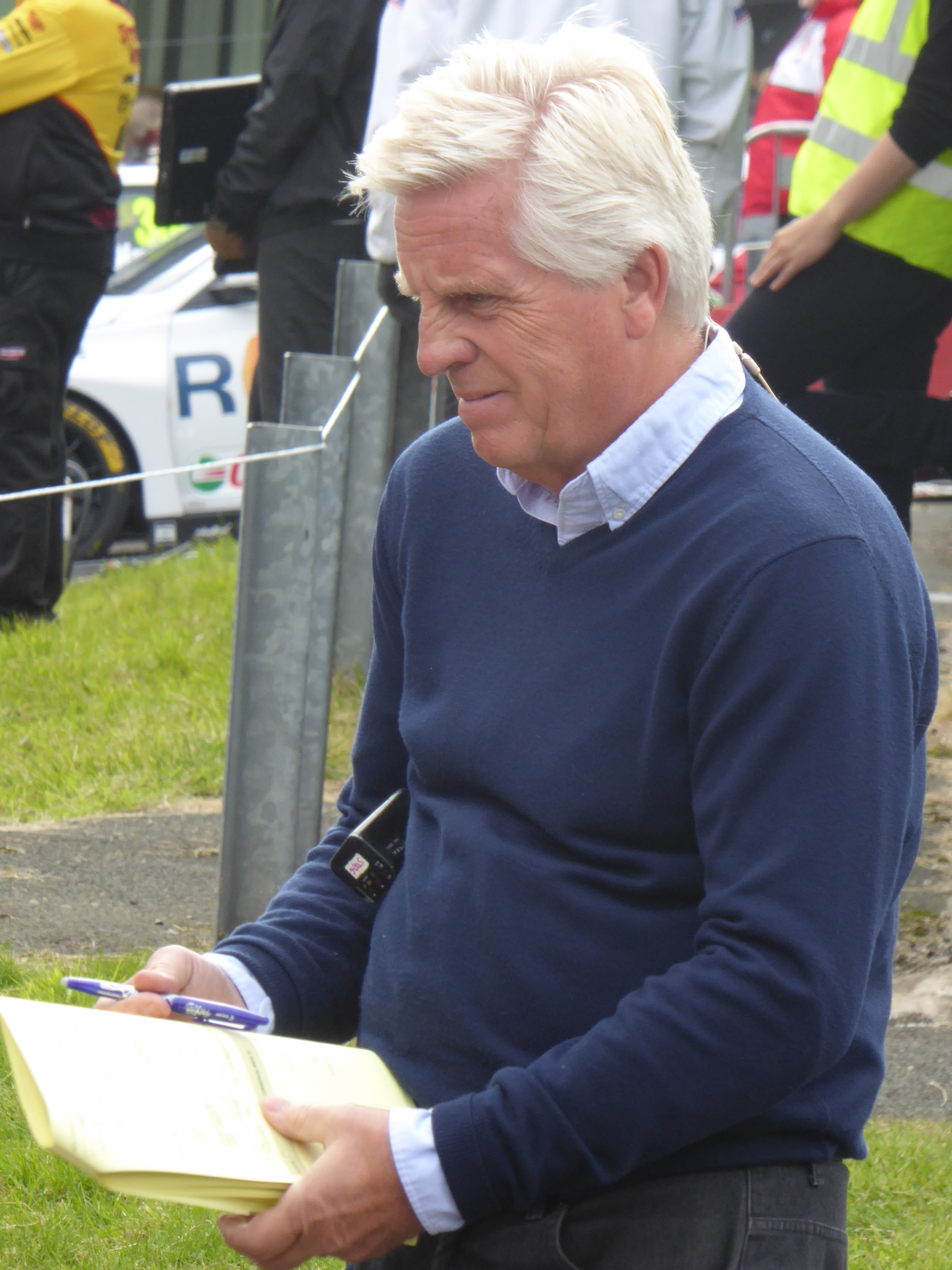
Steve Rider

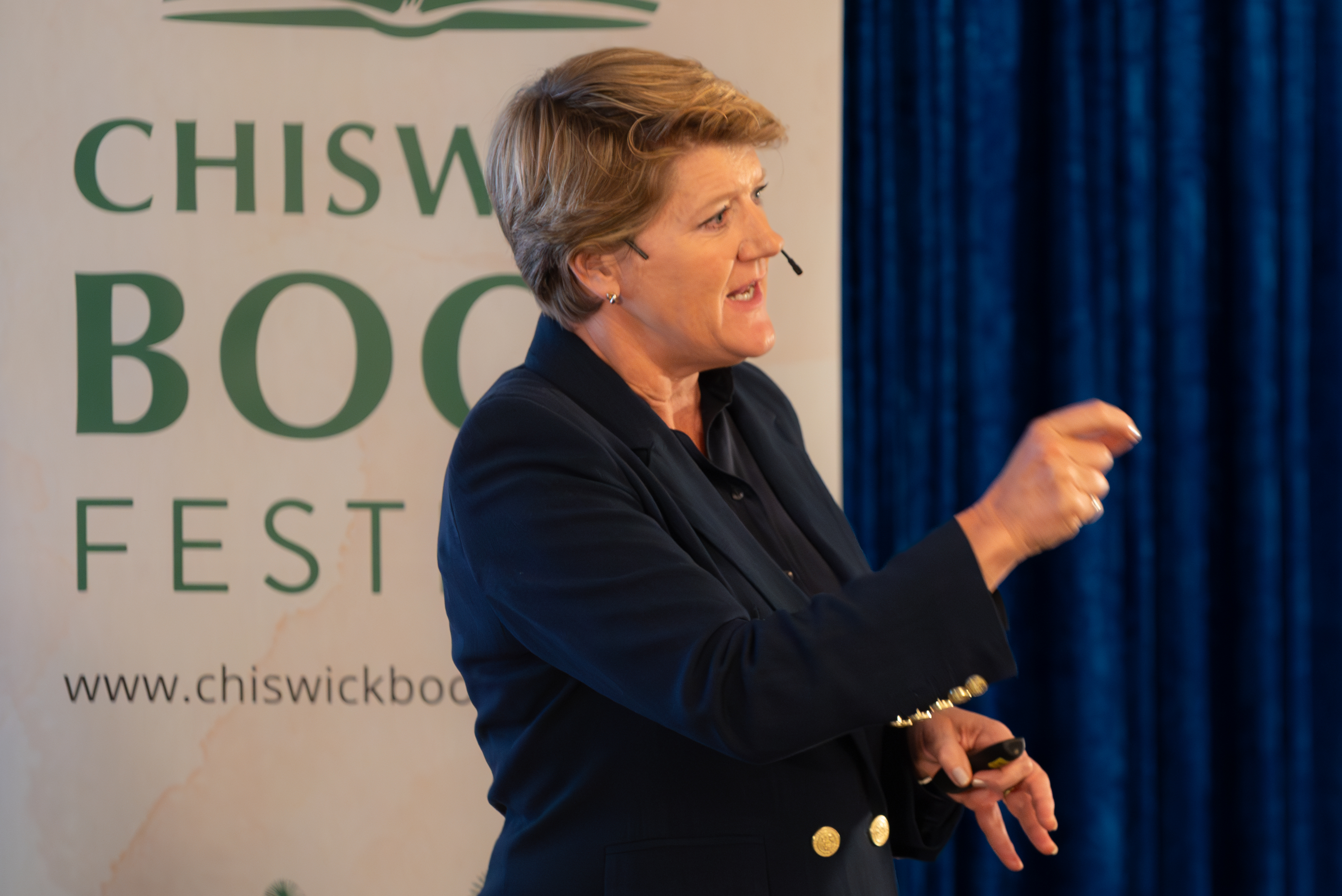
Clare Balding

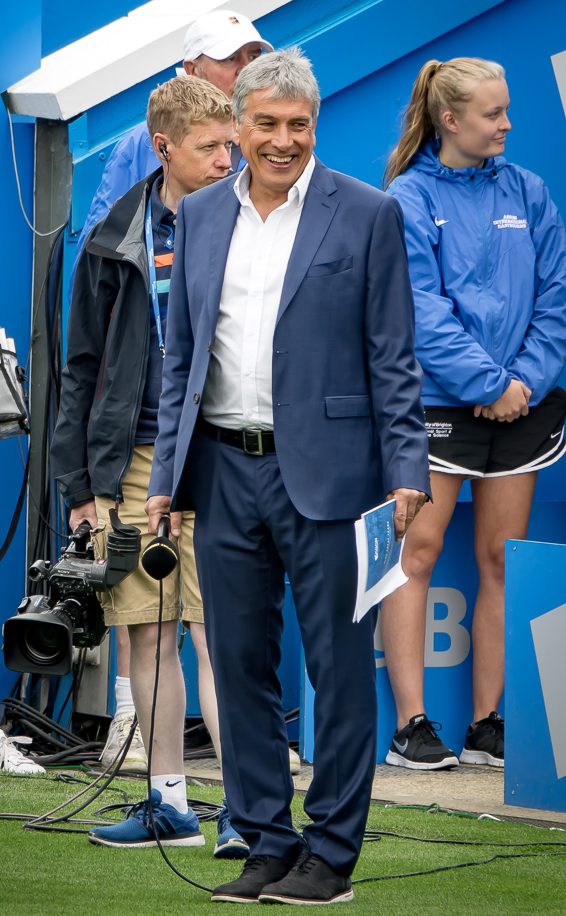
John Inverdale

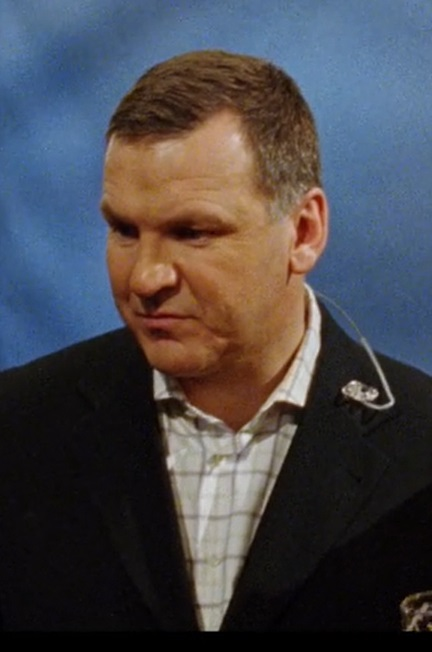
Ray Stubbs

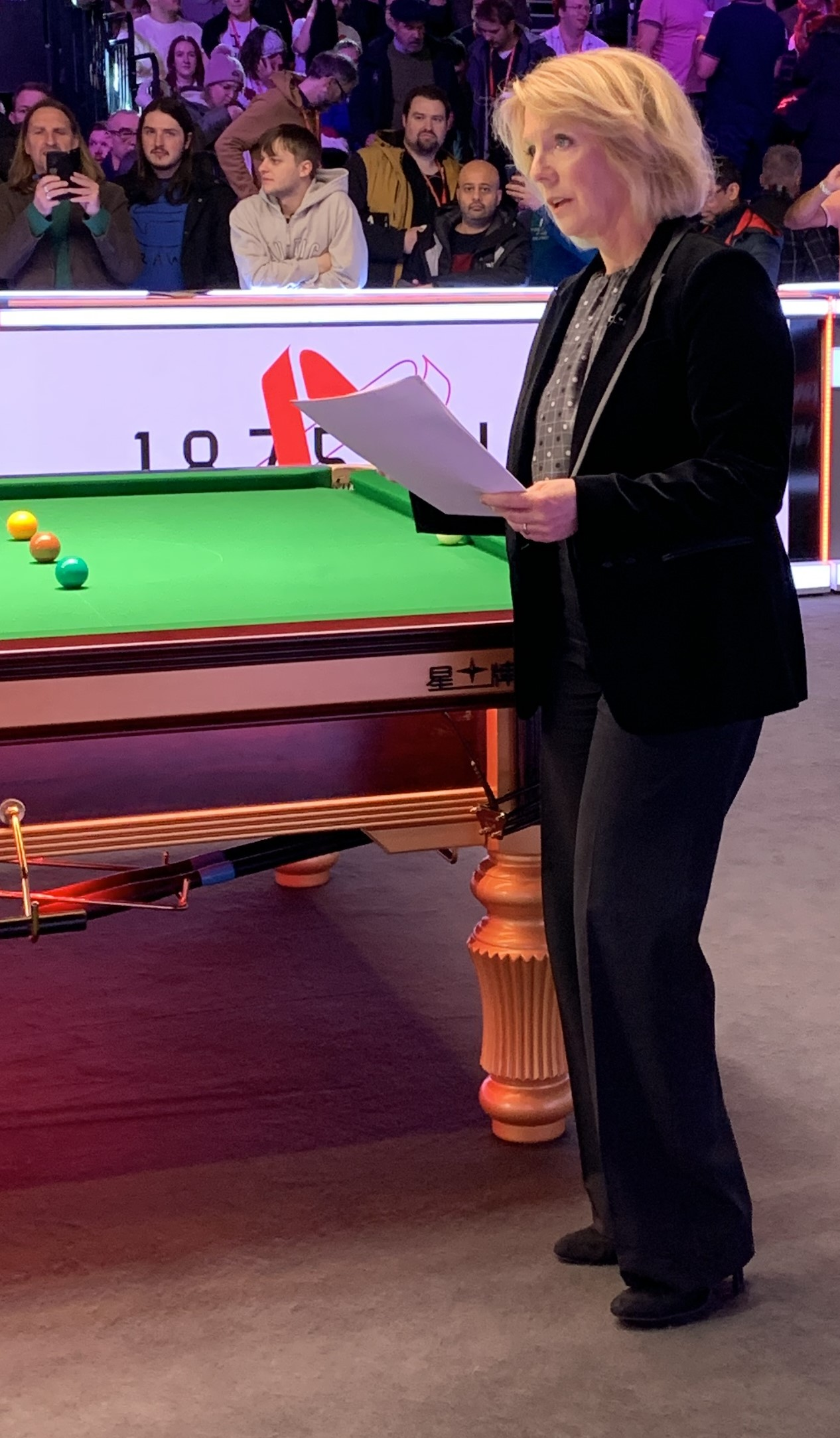
Hazel Irvine

== Theme tune ==
The original theme was "News Scoop" by Len Stevens, which was used until 6 November 1971. From 13 November 1971 to 11 October 1975, another tune, composed by Barry Stoller, who also composed the Match of the Day theme, was used. Grandstand's longest-running and best-known theme, composed for the programme by Keith Mansfield, was first broadcast at the end of the 11 October 1975 edition (the 1000th edition of Grandstand) and (apart from a brief remix which commenced in September 1999 but dropped after a few weeks due to complaints) remained until the end of Grandstand's existence.

== See also ==
- Wide World of Sports
- World of Sport
- Broadcasting of sports events
- Colemanballs
