= Football Focus =

- Also known as: Football
- Genre: Sport
- Presented by: various (see below)
- Country of origin: United Kingdom
- Original language: English

Production
- Production locations: Studio TC5, BBC Television Centre (1974–1987, 1992–2012); dock10 studios (2012–2026)
- Running time: 30–60 minutes

Original release
- Network: BBC One
- Release: 31 August 1974 – 19 December 1987
- Release: 15 August 1992 – 24 May 2026

Related
- Match of the Day; Match of the Day 2; Final Score; The Football League Show; The Premier League Show

Football Focus is a BBC television magazine programme broadcast from 31 August 1974 until 19 December 1987, and from 15 August 1992 until 24 May 2026, live on BBC One on Saturday lunchtimes during the football season. The programme, alongside Final Score, was a segment of the flagship sports show Grandstand, which for decades dominated the BBC One Saturday afternoon television schedules. Football Focus became a programme in its own right in 2001.

It was a weekly magazine, with reports from across the country at all levels of English and Scottish football. It previewed the weekend's fixtures and provided updates from games which had already kicked off. Since the BBC had the rights to Premier League highlights, Football Focus also showed the key moments from midweek matches.

The presenter was normally joined by two football pundits, and Match of the Day commentators often checked in with game previews from the stadiums.

== History ==
For several years until 1974, Grandstand aired a slot called "Football Preview", previewing the day's matches which, in 1974, evolved into Football Focus, which continued to be part of Grandstand and was the first item of the programme.

From 1988 to 1992, the Football Focus title was dropped. Football previews were only broadcast by the BBC on FA Cup weekends, as ITV had exclusive English Football League rights during this period. The Football Focus brand was restored in August 1992 when the BBC won the Premier League highlights rights and the programme again became a weekly slot as the first item of Grandstand. This continued until the start of the 2001–2002 season, when Football Focus became a stand-alone lunchtime show.

In 2009, Dan Walker became the main host. The show moved to the MediaCityUK complex in Salford, Greater Manchester, in 2011.

In August 2021, former Arsenal and England player Alex Scott became the first full-time female presenter of the show. She replaced Dan Walker, who had presented the show for the previous twelve years.

=== Cancellation ===
On 23 April 2026, it was announced that Football Focus would be axed at the end of the season after 52 years on air, with the final episode airing on 24 May 2026.

== Presenters ==
- pre-1974: – Sam Leitch
- 1974–1994: Bob Wilson
- 1994–1996: Steve Rider (hosted as part of his duties as presenter of Grandstand)
- 1996–1999: Gary Lineker
- 1999–2004: Ray Stubbs
- 2004–2009: Manish Bhasin
- 2009–2021: Dan Walker
- 2021–2026: Alex Scott

== Guest presenters ==
- 2005: Mark Pougatch
- 2006: Celina Hinchcliffe
- 2007, 2008: Jake Humphrey (presented during 2007 Ashes and Cricket World Cup. Also was main host during Euro 2008 Football Focus)
- 2014: Mark Chapman (presented a World Cup special edition)
- 2016, 2021: Eilidh Barbour (presented during 2016 Olympics while Dan Walker was in Rio, she also presented in late 2021)
- 2018: Seema Jaswal (one episode)
- 2020: Kelly Somers

== Theme song ==
For the 2002–2003 season, the theme song was "Backaround" by Elevator Suite. The 2003–2004 season featured a cover of the Stevie Nicks track "Stand Back" by Linus Loves featuring Sam Obernik. For the 2007–2008 season, it was "Kill the Director" by The Wombats and for the 2009–2010 season it was "Jetstream" by Doves, from the album Kingdom of Rust. For the 2012–2013 season, it was "Undegpedwar" by Y Niwl from the self-titled album, and continued as the theme for the 2013–2014 season. For the 2023–2024 season, "Seventeen Going Under" by Sam Fender became the new theme song.

== Studio ==
From 2012 until the programme's conclusion, it was broadcast from BBC Sport's headquarters and main studios in MediaCityUK in Salford, although some episodes were broadcast on location, from football grounds. The studio was located at the dock10 studios facility.

== Other versions ==
A version of the programme focusing on world football aired on BBC World News.

== See also ==
- On the Ball
- Saint and Greavsie
