= John Rawling =

British sports journalist

- Born: Sheffield, England, UK
- Education: Manchester University
- Occupation: Sportscaster
- Children: 3

John Rawling is a British boxing, track and field and darts commentator currently working for ITV and Talksport. As lead boxing commentator for TalkSport, John works alongside former European super-bantamweight champion Spencer Oliver. John has also commentated on Track and Field and Paralympic sports with Channel 4 receiving a BAFTA for Best Live Sports Coverage for their work on the 2012 games

John worked on subsequent Paralympic games through to 2022 and also worked as lead boxing commentator with ITV, Sky, BT and BoxNation.

He has commentated on many notable world titles fights from the 1980s through to the present day.

before joining ITV, John was a commentator on BBC Radio, covering major athletics meetings from 1988 as BBC Athletics Correspondent, winning the Sony Radio Sports Commentator of the Year award, and working on many other sports.

Previous work experience includes a spell at the Mansfield Chad, Roland Orton's Leicester News Service and BBC Radio Leicester.

He has also written for national newspapers, most notably The Guardian.

John has three children, lives in Leicestershire with his partner. Interests include golf, classic cars and his beloved German Shepherd Dog Winnie.

== Education ==
Rawling was educated at King Edward VII, Sheffield and Manchester University.

== Broadcasting career ==
Rawling previously commentated on boxing and athletics for BBC Radio, and was named Sony Radio Sports Broadcaster of the Year in 1994. He was the lead commentator at four Olympic Games from Barcelona in 1992 to Athens in 2004. He was covering major title fights for the BBC from 1987 until 2005. He contributed some boxing commentary on BBC television. He also reported football matches, cricket and golf for BBC Radio. His long-term commentating partner on BBC Radio 5 Live, Duke McKenzie, a former world boxing champion at three weights, moved to ITV at the same time as Rawling. Rawling commentated for Setanta Sports, alongside Richie Woodhall, who also acted as co-commentator for BT and he teamed up with another for world champion, Barry Jones, working for Box Nation

From the start of the 2007/08 season to 2008/09, John commentated for ITV on The Championship, the Sunday morning Football League highlights programme and was a regular contributor to Champions League and FA Cup broadcasts. He has also commentated on football for various other broadcast organisations, including 2010 World Cup and Premier League for Talksport radio and he has provided television commentaries for the Premier League, broadcast on their world feed. John also commentates on darts for ITV4 and ESPN

Rawling became a presenter and commentator on the paid-subscription boxing channel BoxNation in September 2011. Rawling was also commentator for the 2013 America's Cup.

He returned to BBC 5 Live to commentate on darts, in the 2014 PDC World Championship final. From 2014 John Rawling has commented on the BDO World Darts Championships at the Lakeside Country Club for firstly for BBC Sport then BT Sport.

== Writing ==
Rawling has written for a number of UK newspapers, such as The Guardian. He was The Guardian boxing correspondent from 1997 to 2009 following the retirement of John Rodda, and has also written many articles on other sports besides boxing.

== Radio ==
Rawling made frequent appearances on the BBC Radio 5 Live sports punditry programme Fighting Talk since its first series.

== Personal life ==
John has three children and lives in Leicestershire. He has a German Shepherd 'Winnie and is an enthusiastic golfer.
