= NoNoNo (band) =

Swedish indie rock band

NONONO
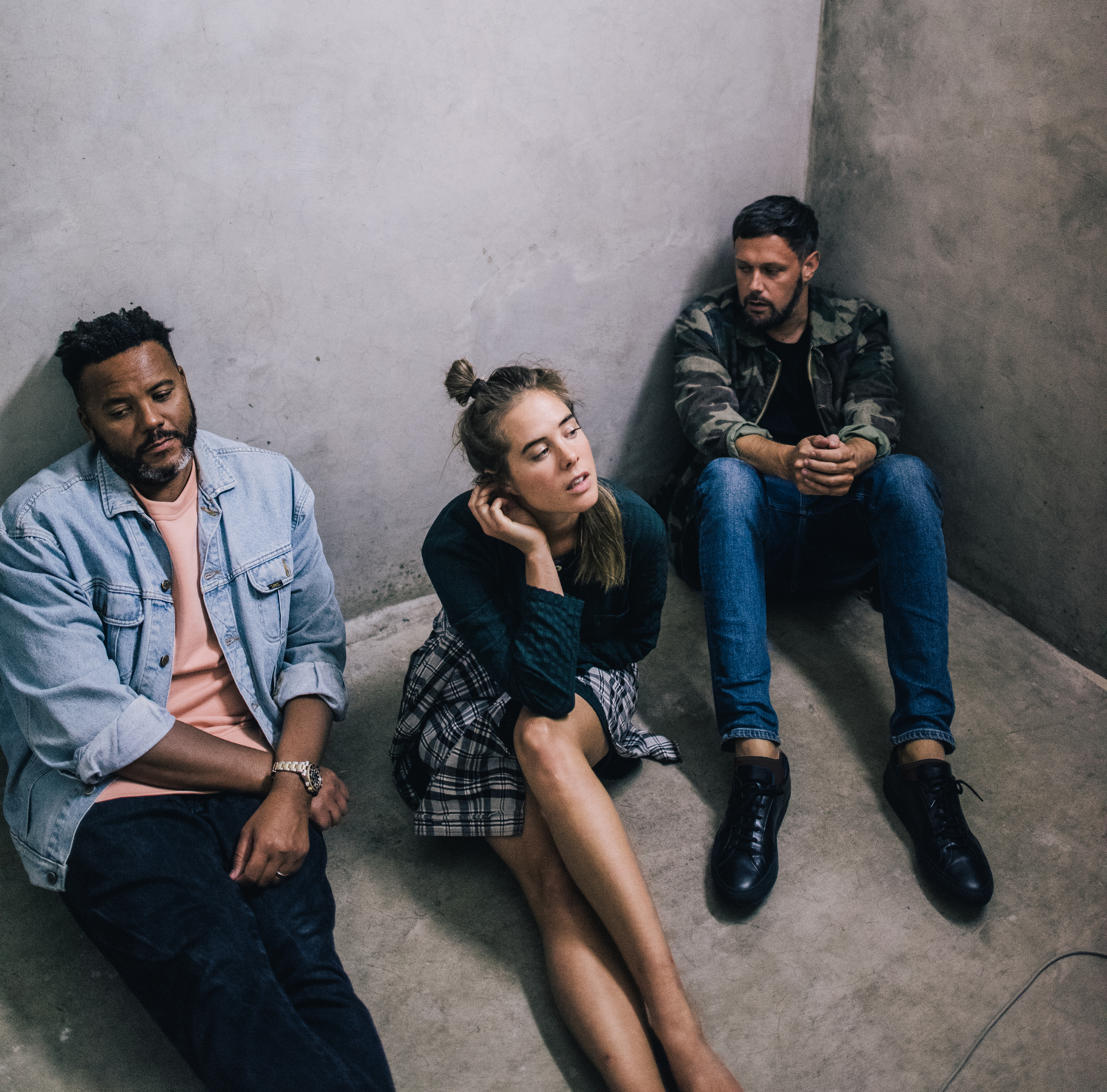
- NoNoNo in 2017

Background information
- Origin: Stockholm, Sweden
- Genres: Indie rock; indie pop; alternative rock
- Years active: 2012–present
- Label: Warner Music AB
- Members: Stina Wäppling; Tobias "Astma" Jimson; Michel "Rocwell" Flygare
- Website: nononoofficial.com

NoNoNo (stylised as NONONO) is a Swedish indie rock band formed in 2012. Their debut single, "Pumpin Blood", has charted in Europe and the US, peaking at number 22 on the Billboard Alternative Songs chart and at number 32 on the Pop Songs chart, among others. The single sold 700,000 copies worldwide.

== Discography ==
=== Studio albums ===
Title	Album details	Peak chart positions
Title	Album details	US Heat.
We Are Only What We Feel	Released: 13 March 2014; Label: Warner Music/Warner Bros.; Produced by Astma & Rocwell	41
Undertones	Released: 28 September 2018; Label: Warner Music Sweden/Warner Bros.; Produced by Astma & Rocwell	—
Just Playing Dead Serious	Released: 4 October 2024; Label: Under exclusive license to Warner Music Germany; Produced by Astma & Rocwell, Stina Wäppling	

=== EPs ===
Title	Album details	Peak chart positions
Title	Album details	US Heat.
Pumpin Blood	Released: 17 September 2013; Label: Warner Bros.	37

=== Singles ===
Title	Year	Peak chart positions								Certifications	Album
Title	Year	AUT	GER	SWI	US	US Adult	US Alt.	US Pop	US Rock	Certifications	Album
"Pumpin Blood"	2013	16	30	55	— (Note: "Pumpin' Blood" did not enter the Billboard Hot 100 but peaked at number 19 on the Bubbling Under Hot 100 Singles chart.)	31	22	32	23	RIAA: Gold	We Are Only What We Feel
"Like the Wind"	2013	—	—	—	—	—	—	—	—		We Are Only What We Feel
"Hungry Eyes"	2014	—	—	—	—	—	—	—	—		We Are Only What We Feel
"One Wish"	2014	—	—	—	—	—	—	—	—		We Are Only What We Feel
"Masterpiece"	2017	—	—	—	—	—	—	—	—		Undertones
"Lost Song"	2018	—	—	—	—	—	—	—	—		Undertones
"Friends"	2018	—	—	—	—	—	—	—	—		Undertones
"Dancing (Mumbai Wedding)"	2018	—	—	—	—	—	—	—	—		Undertones
"Our Time Is Now"	2024	—	—	—	—	—	—	—	—		Just Playing Dead Serious
"—" denotes a recording that did not chart or was not released in that territory.
