= Matt Smith (broadcaster) =

British broadcaster (born 1967)

- Born: 26 April 1967 (age 58); Liverpool, England
- Occupation(s): Sport presenter, broadcaster, journalist
- Employer: TNT Sports

Matt Smith (born 26 April 1967) is a British broadcaster who worked with ITV Sport between 2001 and 2015. He currently presents TNT Sports' coverage of Premier League, FA Cup, Champions League, Europa League, Conference Football and England Under 21 matches.

== Early life ==
Smith is a Modern Languages and Political Studies graduate from Sheffield City Polytechnic, where he studied from 1985 to 1989. During that time, he spent a year in Italy as part of his studies. He was then offered an internship with the Associated Press in Rome, before moving on to the Financial Times as a television producer.

== Career ==
=== Radio ===
After leaving the Financial Times, Smith joined the Business Unit at BBC News, and presented business reports on John Inverdale's programme on Radio 5 Live. He gained his first sport–presenting role on Chris Evans' Radio 1 Breakfast Show.

Smith presented BBC Radio Four's final children's programme, Go 4 It.

Until May 2008, he presented Weekend Breakfast on Radio 5 Live with Rachel Burden, along with occasional cover on the Drive 4pm–7pm weekday show.

=== Television ===
At the BBC, Smith worked initially on Midlands Today, Breakfast, and BBC News 24, before moving onto Football Fever, World Snooker, and international events including the Sydney Olympics and Euro 2000, before joining ITV in the summer of 2001.

Smith was one of the presenters on the ITV Sport Channel. After that he hosted coverage of UEFA Cup live matches and UEFA Champions League highlights. In the past, he has presented The Championship highlights programme every Sunday on ITV, and UEFA Champions League Live matches on ITV4 until ITV lost the respective contracts. He has also occasionally presented ITV Granada's weekly football show, Soccer Night.

During the 2002 World Cup in Korea and Japan, Smith hosted a panel-based show featuring debate and World Cup highlights every evening during the tournament. At Euro 2004, he was the senior reporter based with the England team.

Smith has also hosted On The Ball and Speed Sunday, and has reported at ITV's boxing coverage. He is also the main presenter of ITV's Darts coverage since the sport returned to the channel in 2007 after a long absence, presenting the Grand Slam of Darts, European Darts Championship, UK Open, The Masters and The Players Championship alongside Chris Mason and Alan Warriner-Little. He also presented Snooker for ITV4 and was the main presenter of ITV coverage of IPL Cricket from 2010–2014 until they lost the rights to Sky Sports.

Smith regularly appeared on ITV4 as well as the main ITV channel. However, he left ITV at the end of the 2015 football season as ITV lost the rights to live coverage of UEFA Champions League and Europa League matches. He was replaced by Jacqui Oatley. While at ITV, Smith covered 4 World Cups, 3 European Championships, hosted coverage of FA Cup Finals, Champions League Finals, Europa League Finals, England Internationals, European Qualifiers, International Friendlies, African Cup of Nations, IPL Cricket, Snooker and Pdc Darts.

After his contract finished with ITV in 2015, he became freelance. He now works for TNT Sports working on Premier League, FA Cup, Champions League, Europa League, Conference Football, England Under 21 coverage as a presenter. He also hosted the BDO World Darts Championship 2017 for BT Sport. Since 2015 he has also returned to the BBC News Channel (formally BBC News 24) as a sports reporter/presenter and has also presented shows such as Kick Off and Weekend Sports Breakfast for Talksport.

== Personal life ==
Smith is a fan of Liverpool Football Club.
