= Len Stevens (composer) =

Herbert Leonard Stevens (28 November 1910 – 13 May 1989) better known as Len Stevens, was a British composer, specializing in light music but producing works in many other categories. Among the best-known pieces he composed were News Scoop (used from 1958 until 1971 as the original theme tune to Grandstand on BBC television) and Easy Street, which appeared on the Chappell Recorded Music label. Stevens learned his trade in the pre-war British dance bands, and was employed as an orchestrator and theatre musician, while contributing original compositions to several recorded music libraries (including Chappell, Francis, Day and Hunter, Josef Weinberger and KPM).

The orchestral piece Avalanche (1948) is a musical interpretation of an avalanche from its dramatic beginning through a frantic centre piece to its quiet aftermath. Other titles by Stevens include Caribbean Caprice, Cinema Foyer, Clear Night, High Cloud, Holiday on Ice, La Madrilena, Lido Fashion Parade, Madame in Mayfair, Mountain Rally and Stampede. His music was often performed by Sidney Torch and his Orchestra.

== Personal life and death ==
Stevens was born in Wandsworth, London, England on 28 November 1910. He was married to Doris Mansfield in 1933. In 1962 he was living at Pineholme, Ellesmere Road in Weybridge. By 1969 he had moved to Josselin, Pyrford Woods, Woking. He died in Surrey on 13 May 1989, at the age of 78.
