= Mark Clemmit =

British sports reporter (born 1962)

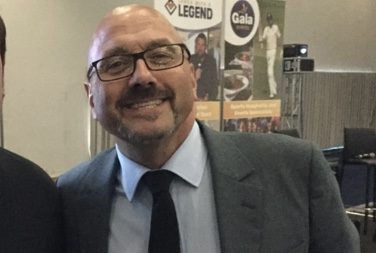
- Clemmit in June 2018
- Born: Mark Charles Clemmit; 22 October 1962 (age 63); Middlesbrough, Yorkshire
- Occupation: Broadcaster
- Known for: TV and radio personality
- Website: http://www.markclemmit.com

Mark Clemmit, popularly known as Clem, is a reporter on BBC One's Football Focus. He has also worked on many of the BBC's flagship football programmes including Final Score, The Football League Show, MOTD2 and Match of the Day Live. He's one of the longest established voices on BBC Radio 5 Live. He has also reported for BBC One's topical daily magazine programme, The One Show, presented the consumer programme How Safe Is Your House and written a column for The Times.

== Broadcasting career ==
Clemmit has described his broadcasting career as a happy accident. A chance comment on the way home from a football match, led to his idea for a radio fanzine programme, dedicated to his local team – Middlesbrough. Producing and recording a pilot, Red Balls On Fire was first broadcast in 1998. The programme was initially given a five-week run on BBC Radio Cleveland. (The station later rebranded itself as BBC Tees.) Within nine months and on a small weekly budget, Red Balls On Fire was nominated for a Sony Radio Award, repeating the feat a year later.

Clemmit came to the notice of BBC Radio 5 Live and he began to do interviews and match reports for them. He has become a familiar voice on BBC Radio 5 Live, specialising in football below the Premier League. He has presented the station's flagship 5 Live Sport and their coverage of the Great North Run. He is also an occasional host of BBC Radio 5 Live Sports Extra's coverage of the Football League.

A Regional RTS Awards winner, Clemmit has worked as a football reporter and pundit on BBC Regional TV in the North East. He has been a regular contributor to BBC Breakfast, the BBC News Channel and on Simon Mayo's Sports Panel. Clemmit's TV reporting credits include: Final Score, Football Focus, Match of the Day and Match of the Day 2. He has also reported on major international football tournaments for the BBC. In 2009, Clemmit became the features reporter on BBC One′s The Football League Show.

In an interview in 2009, Clemmit said: "I love the game at the lower levels. There's more access, more closeness to it, you don't have to go through 100 other people before you can speak to the person you want. You can go to a lower league ground, knock on the manager's door and if he's not busy he'll see you. You see all the Premiership players arriving in what are virtual stagecoaches, dripping in diamonds, trailing their escorts. There's an aloofness about the game at that level that I'm not really comfortable with."
