= Len Martin =

- Born: Leonard Martin; 17 April 1919; Rockhampton, Queensland, Australia
- Died: 21 August 1995 (aged 76); Northwood, Middlesex, England
- Occupation: Classified results reader
- Years active: 1954–1995
- Employer: BBC
- Television: Grandstand

Leonard Martin (17 April 1919 – 21 August 1995) was an Australian-born British classified results reader. He worked in radio broadcasting at Australian radio stations and was known in the United Kingdom for reading out the football results, associated football pools statistics and horse-racing results on the BBC's Saturday afternoon sports programme, Grandstand, from 1958 until the end of the 1994–95 English football season.

== Biography ==
Martin was born in Rockhampton in the north of Queensland on 17 April 1919. He was educated at Columban College in Brisbane and spent his apprenticeship at sea with the Blue Star Line when he was a teenager prior to the outbreak of the Second World War. Martin made the choice to start a career in commercial radio broadcasting, performing racing commentary, script writing and announcing. He worked at the radio station 4BK in Brisbane before working jobs with other stations in the outback of Queensland, at Charleville, Roma and Bundaberg. Martin later moved to Murwillumbah, New South Wales to work at Sydney station 2GB, serving as compere of the Hour of Music programme.

In late 1949, Martin joined 2CH in Sydney and became the station's chief night announcer. He was the compere of the evening programme Stump the Experts, and the entertainment programme All Shades of Harmony. In 1953, Martin chose to take a break from Australian broadcasting and he and his wife Cynthia went on a three-month cruise to Europe and saw the Coronation of Elizabeth II. During the holiday, he visited Alexandra Palace, the headquarters of BBC Television. After mentioning his career in Australian broadcasting, a BBC producer asked Martin to provide his hotel number in the event they needed help while he was in London. He received a call from the BBC the day before he was due to sail for Australia from Southampton. He never used his return ticket home.

He made a radio documentary about life in Australia and began working in BBC Television in 1954. Martin got his first job in BBC Sport by Paul Fox, working as film commentator for the sports programme Sportsview. He also worked on Sports Special as well as racing and coverage of the Olympic Games. Martin performed his role of reading the classified football results on most editions of the Saturday sports programme Grandstand from the very first edition of the show on 11 October 1958 until the conclusion of the 1994–95 English football season; he left mid-way through reading the results during the 9 October 1993 edition because of a sore throat caused by a cold he caught on a visit to Australia and was replaced by Tim Gudgin for the rest of the programme. He was the inventor of the technique of intonation when reading the football scores. It was clear from the way in which Martin presented the home or away team name, followed by number of goals, whether the result was a home win, an away win, a no-score draw or a score draw; this was important for the football pools results. His tone lowered when there was an home win and rose when there was an away win but was level for a draw. Gudgin, Martin's successor, also used the distinct BBC intonation.

In addition to his role on Grandstand, Martin was a voice-over artist heard on Movietone and Pathé News newsreels, documentary films and on commercials across the world. He also read the horse racing results, was a voice over for multiple editions of the BBC Sports Review of the Year awards ceremony until 1994, and also used to run four flights of stairs at Lime Grove Studios in the late 1960s after Grandstand to introduce Simon Dee's programme, with 'Simon' elongated, in the distinctive manner.

== Personal life ==
He and his wife had a daughter. Martin died in hospital in Northwood, Middlesex on 21 August 1995 following a short illness.
