= The Pearl (novella) =

1947 novella by John Steinbeck

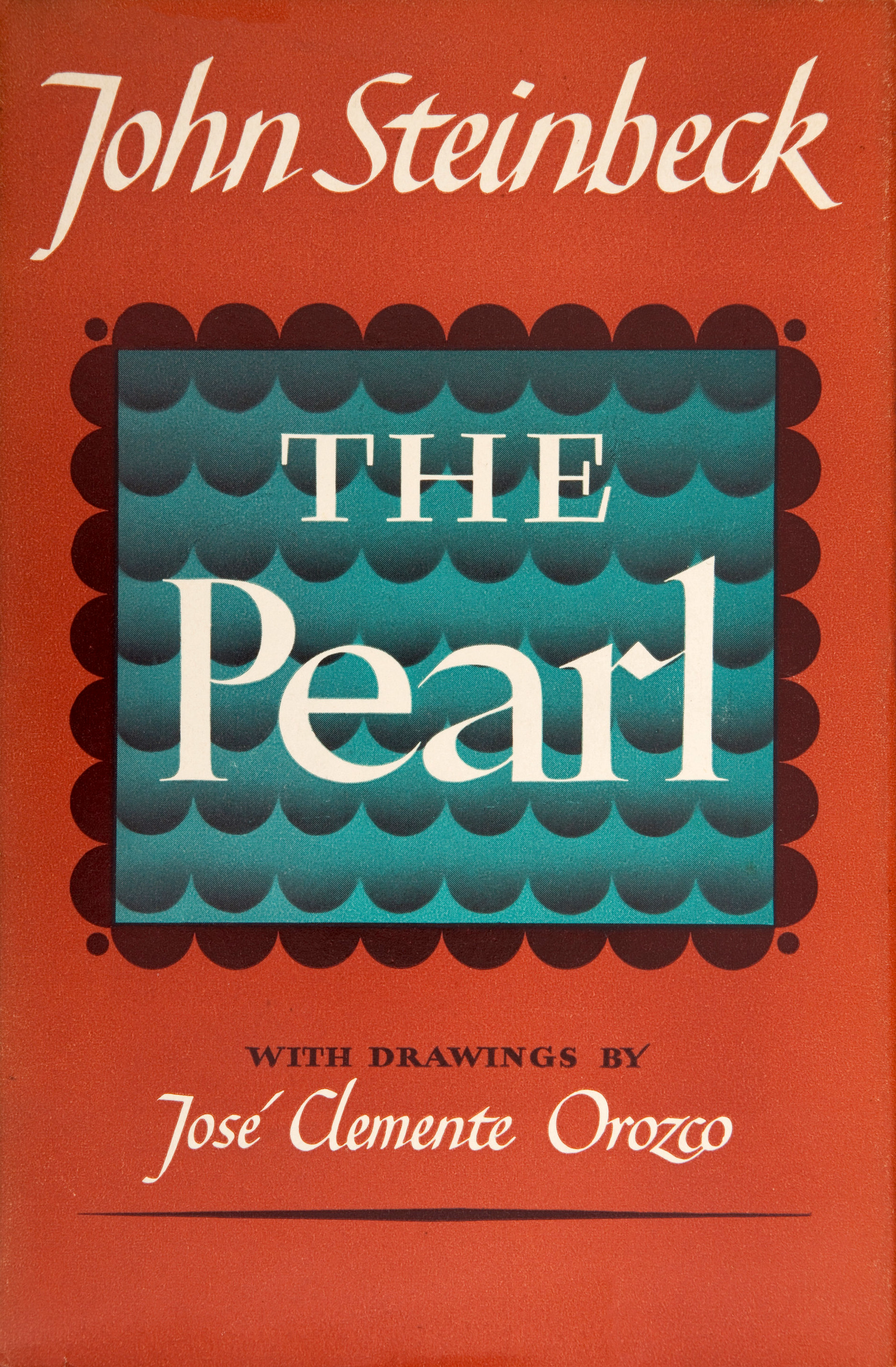
- First edition (US)
- Author: John Steinbeck
- Illustrator: José Clemente Orozco
- Cover artist: Robert Hallock
- Language: English, Spanish, Portuguese
- Set in: La Paz, Baja California Sur, 1940s
- Publisher: The Viking Press (US); William Heinemann (UK); Fondo de Cultura Económica (Mexico and rest of Latin America)
- Publication date: 1947
- Publication place: United States, Mexico
- Media type: Print (Hardback & Paperback)
- ISBN: 0-14-017737-X
- OCLC: 27697348

The Pearl is a piece of literature by the American author John Steinbeck. It was first published as a short story in 1945, and later published as an expanded novella two years later. The story follows a pearl diver, Kino, and explores man's purpose as well as greed, defiance of societal norms, and evil. Steinbeck's inspiration was a Mexican folk tale from La Paz, Baja California Sur, which he had heard in a visit to the formerly pearl-rich region in 1940.

The Pearl is one of Steinbeck's most popular books and has been widely used in US middle and high school classes. The Pearl is sometimes considered a parable.

The book was adapted as a Mexican film named La Perla (1947) and as a Kannada-language movie Ondu Muttina Kathe (1987) in India.

== Plot ==
La Paz, Baja California Sur

Kino, a poor pearl fisherman, lives with his wife, Juana, and their infant son, Coyotito, in La Paz, Baja California Sur. One day, Kino sees a scorpion crawl down one of the ropes holding up the hanging box that serves as Coyotito's crib and tries to remove it. However, Coyotito shakes the frayed rope, causing the scorpion to fall into the box and sting him. Kino and Juana visit the local doctor but are turned away because of their poverty and his prejudices toward Amerindians.

As Juana applies a seaweed poultice to the sting, Kino dives for oysters from his canoe, hoping to find a pearl valuable enough to cover the treatment fee. One oyster yields an immense pearl, which Kino calls "The Pearl of the World"; news of its discovery spreads quickly, and some of the family's neighbors start to resent Kino's luck in finding it. Unaware of these reactions, Kino envisions selling the pearl and using the money to improve his family's lives. The doctor visits them to treat Coyotito, even though the baby seems to be recovering, and Kino promises to pay him after selling the pearl.

That night, Kino drives off a thief who attempts to break into his house. Juana warns Kino that the pearl will destroy the family, but Kino insists that it is their only chance for a better life. He goes to sell it the next day, not knowing that all the pearl dealers in La Paz are working for a single buyer and conspiring to keep prices low. Pretending that Kino's pearl is of poor quality, they make offers of 1,500 pesos at most; he angrily rejects them, believing the pearl to be worth 50,000 pesos, and vows to sell it in the capital instead.

More thieves attack Kino that night, but he remains resolved to make the journey despite Juana's warning that the pearl is evil and her suggestions to get rid of it. After Kino beats her to stop her from throwing it into the ocean, he is attacked again; Kino kills one man in self-defense, and he and Juana hurriedly flee with Coyotito to avoid any reprisals. Discovering that Kino's canoe has been damaged and their house looted and burned in search of the pearl, the family takes refuge with Kino's brother and his wife before setting out for the capital the following night.

As they travel, Kino spots three men following them and realizes that they are trackers intending to take the pearl and kill the entire family. Leaving the road they have been using, Kino leads Juana into the mountains in order to leave fewer signs of their passage. They take shelter in a cave, only for the trackers to make camp by a pool of water below them. Kino decides to attack the trio that night, viewing it as the only way they can stop the pursuers for good. As Kino sneaks down the cliff, one of the trackers hears a cry and fires his rifle in its direction, thinking it to be a coyote pup. Kino kills all of the trackers, but discovers that the shot has killed Coyotito.

Kino and Juana return to La Paz with Coyotito's body. After looking at the pearl one last time and seeing its surface reflect images of all the disasters that have befallen him and his family, Kino throws it into the ocean.

== Background ==
In 1944, Steinbeck began writing the story as a movie script, and first published it as a short story called "The Pearl of the World" in the Woman's Home Companion (December 1945). The original publication is also sometimes listed as "The Pearl of La Paz". Steinbeck expanded the story to novella length and published it under the name The Pearl (1947), published by Viking Press.

=== Setting ===
The book takes place in La Paz, Baja California, Mexico. Unlike many of Steinbeck's other works, it does not take place in the U.S. state of California.

== Themes ==
Family – One of the major themes in the novel is family. Throughout the novel, the plot discusses how the family lives before and after the pearl. It is the constant focus of the plot and many of the decisions are based on what would be best for the family. For example, the first thing that Kino desires to do with the money from the pearl is to give his wife and Coyotito a better life. This money would pay for Coyotito’s education, better clothes, and better protection. Later, Kino also demonstrates devotion to his family by not selling to the pearl dealer. The second buyer was trying to get the pearl for less than it was worth, but Kino, with his family in mind, declined to search for a better deal. He always has his family in mind, whether it leads to warmth and happiness or destruction. It was the reason Kino got the pearl and, eventually, the reason why he threw it back into the ocean.

Good and Evil – One of the major themes in this novel is the one between good and evil. Steinbeck complicates these simple notions of good and bad by showing how evil can come in beautiful or prestigious packages like the Doctor, the Priest, or even in the end, the Pearl of the World.

Kino often hears a refrain of music, a device Steinbeck uses to offer the reader insight into the inner world of the characters and the emotional crux of each scene. Kino hears the music of evil first associated with the Western Doctor who only comes to help Coyotito's scorpion bite after he hears that Kino has found the Pearl. The Doctor lies to Kino by saying the baby is still sick when the narrator has told us that Coyotito is on the mend. At this moment, Kino is confused when he hears the music of evil because he wants to believe and look up to the Doctor, but the Doctor, like the other false friends he meets in town, are trying to take advantage of him.

Colonialism – While the story is presented as a fable with a simple moral at the end, seemingly to warn readers of being greedy or defying the gods by trying to change their station, the underlying message is a critique of the systemic economic and societal disparity between the indigenous community of which Kino and Juana are a part and the wealthier colonial settlers of the fictional La Paz, the neighboring city in Baja Mexico. Steinbeck portrays Kino and Juana as eager to gain access to the medicine and education of the colonial population after getting rejected by the local Doctor. Once they find the pearl, they are willing to take great risks to give Coyotito access so that he might improve his station and gain knowledge from the world beyond their indigenous traditions. However, throughout the story, we see that the people in power in the city of plaster are well-placed to maintain their position of wealth and power by lying and conspiring against Kino and Juana when they come to the city to sell the pearl.

Paradox – The theme of paradox is displayed through Kino’s desires. Once Kino discovers the pearl, he begins to dream about what could come from this fortune as greed fills his head, but as he tries to carry out this plan, the good wealth also brings destruction to his family as he treats Juana poorly and is abusive. Though Kino desires good for his family, there is a paradox of an evil reality that he does not want. Kino tries to “avoid life’s inevitable tension” between these two but he finds that he cannot separate the good and the evil. In the end, the finding of the great prize causes him to lose another, his son.

Perseverance – The theme of perseverance is demonstrated by many characters, but mainly Kino. Before he found the pearl, he was a noble and a very determined person who sought fortune for his family. After he finds it, he is hoping to find it in a different way. Because Kino believes that this would save his family, he persists “through many obstacles” that accompany the pearl. He perseveres to keep the pearl but, in the end, it was not worth keeping.

== Characters ==
Kino is a hard-working pearl-diver and the protagonist of the novella. He has a wife, Juana, and a son, Coyotito. Kino is content with his lifestyle as a diver and possesses nothing of value until he discovers the pearl. After finding the pearl, Kino gradually changes to become a completely different man. Although his family is still the center of his actions, Kino is also driven by his dreams of an escape from their poverty and a desire to give them a better life. Kino quickly becomes obsessed with the material things that the pearl could bring. He is no longer content with Coyotito being uneducated, or his family not being well-dressed. Instead of enjoying his family and their company, as he did in the beginning, Kino becomes discontent and always seeks more. He is also driven by his desire not to be cheated or slighted. Kino is named for the missionary Eusebio Kino.

Juana, Kino’s wife, is a loving woman who cares for her husband and son. Throughout the experience, she remains loyal to her family but also perceives the evil forces that the valuable pearl attracts. For example, two nights after the pearl is found, Juana attempts to throw it back into the ocean to bring back peace and happiness to her family.

Coyotito is Juana and Kino's infant son. He is their only child, and his parents do everything they can to protect him. Despite this, Coyotito is subject to much harm, both before and after the pearl is found. Coyotito is shot and killed by one of the pearl hunters.

The Doctor, unnamed in the novella, is a symbol of wealth, greed, and exploitation. He is repulsive, fat, and also foreign-born, a native of France. Before the pearl is found, the doctor refuses to heal Coyotito because the family is poor, though it would be easy for him to do so. He was also being racist, calling the Native Americans animals. After Kino finds the pearl, the doctor personally visits the family at home, acting much friendlier than at their first meeting and even pretending to heal Coyotito's scorpion sting with ammonia. During the visit, the doctor tries to determine from Kino's glances where in the house the pearl may be hidden, though Kino is too suspicious to reveal anything. The doctor's behavioral changes foreshadow the more serious troubles that begin after Kino's discovery of the pearl.

Juan Tomas, Kino's wise and loyal brother. He is the only other character in the book to suspect the manipulation undertaken by the pearl dealers. When destruction does come, Juan Tomas does not turn away his brother but, instead, welcomes him in and protects him. He is one of the few characters that does not seek to gain from the pearl and shows he values the importance of family ties.

Apolonia is the wife of Juan Tomas who helps his brother in protecting and hiding Kino.

The pearl dealers, like the doctor, symbolize the exploitation of the native population, this time by the organized pearl-dealing cartel for which the dealers work. When Kino tries to sell the pearl, the pearl dealers claim that the pearl's size makes it worthless and offer Kino a fraction of the pearl's true worth. Kino's outrage at their barehanded lies causes him to brave the dangerous trip to the capital and seek a better price.

The thieves and trackers are shadowy figures who attack Kino from the first night he has the pearl. Kino never recognizes who they are. They harass and then follow the family right to the end of the story. They force Kino to fight and kill to defend himself and his family and keep the pearl his own. In the final scenes, in which Kino is tracked by a posse, it is not clear in the text whether the group are thieves or law enforcement officers hunting Kino for his killing of the man on the beach.

== Reception and analysis ==
Several publications praised the novel as a "major artistic triumph" and emphasizes how Steinbeck understands "the universal significance of life." The Pearl is often used to teach students about literature and is also used to discuss important lessons about life. Many believe the book is the easiest of Steinbeck's books to teach because the lessons are simple, yet significant, so, generally, students in middle school or early high school study this novel. Teachers instruct their students to delve deeper than surface level to learn about both the simplicity and complexity of the novel and emphasize its themes to allow students to learn more than just literacy.

Jackson Benson writes, The Pearl was heavily influenced by Steinbeck's interest in the philosophy of Carl Jung. Steinbeck wrote that he created the story of The Pearl to address the themes of "human greed, materialism, and the inherent worth of a thing."

== Legacy ==
=== Musical inspiration ===
Joshua Kadison's 1995 song "The Pearl” is based on this story. Kino and Juana's names are changed to Zandro and Maya in this version.

Fleming and John's 1999 song "The Pearl" is based on this story.

The American composer Andrew Boysen, Jr.'s Concerto for Trombone and Wind Symphony (2004) was inspired by The Pearl.

=== Adaptations ===
As he was writing the novella version, he was frequently travelling to Mexico where the film version, co-written with Jack Wagner, was being filmed. The film was also released by RKO in 1947 as a co-promotion with the book.

In 2001, The Pearl was loosely adapted as a film directed by Alfredo Zacharias, starring Lukas Haas and Richard Harris, which was released directly to video in 2005.

In 1975, the novella was adapted into a play by Warren Frost.
