= Mirko Müller =

German pair skater

Personal information
- Born: 12 November 1974 (age 51) Löbau, East Germany

Figure skating career
- Country: Germany
Medal record
Representing Germany
Pairs' Figure skating
World Championships
Bronze medal – third place	1998 Minneapolis	Pairs

Mirko Müller (born 12 November 1974) is a German pair skater. His first partner was Jekatarina Silnitzkaja, and he later teamed up with Emilie Gras for a year.

Müller found his greatest success when Peggy Schwarz became his partner in 1996. The pair went on to win three gold medals at the German Figure Skating Championships from 1998 to 2000. After competing in the 1998 Winter Olympics, they captured the bronze medal at the World Figure Skating Championships that year.

Schwarz retired in 2000, and Müller found a new partner, Sarah Jentgens. They captured the German national title in 2002.

== Programs ==
=== With Jentgens ===
Season	Short program	Free skating
2002–2003	French Girl in Manhattan (from Jerry Cotton) by Peter Thomas	Migration by Peter Kater
2001–2002	French Girl in Manhattan (from Jerry Cotton) by Peter Thomas	Three Theme medley by Peter Kater, Karlos Nakai

=== With Schwarz ===
Season	Short program	Free skating	Exhibition
1999–2000	New World by Jojo Büld	Patch Adams by Marc Shaiman	Delilah Blue by Joshua Kadison; Mission: Impossible
1998–1999	P.M. Undercover by The Rotosonics	Broken Arrow by Hans Zimmer	Ich dreh' mich um dich by Herbert Grönemeyer; Strong Enough by Cher; Broken Arrow by Hans Zimmer; Wind Beneath My Wings by Bette Midler
1997–1998	Preludin Fugue (from Rush) performed by Eric Clapton	Taj Mahal (from Last Dance) by Mark Isham	Bis ans Ende der Welt by Udo Lindenberg; Jailhouse Rock; Hey Bartender performed by The Blues Brothers; Leaving on a Jet Plane performed by Chantal Kreviazuk
1996–1997	Trouble Don't Last Always by Incognito, Carleen Anderson	Pulp Fiction; 12 Monkeys; Mission: Impossible	Song on Nefertiti's Radio (My Love) by Joshua Kadison; Lost Again; Ocean Club by Yello

== Results ==
GP: Champions Series / Grand Prix

=== With Jentgens ===
International
Event	2001–02
European Championships	WD
National
German Championships	1st
WD = Withdrew

=== With Schwarz ===
International
Event	1996–97	1997–98	1998–99	1999–00
Olympics		9th		
Worlds	10th	3rd	8th	8th
Europeans	6th	5th	4th	4th
GP Nations Cup		4th		
GP NHK Trophy		3rd	2nd	
GP Skate Canada	WD			
National
German Champ.	2nd	1st	1st	1st
WD = Withdrew

=== With Silnitzkaja ===
International
Event	1993–94	1994–95
European Championships		10th
Nations Cup		6th
National
German Championships	4th	2nd
