= Saint and Greavsie =

- Presented by: Ian St John; Jimmy Greaves
- Country of origin: United Kingdom

Production
- Production company: LWT

Original release
- Network: ITV
- Release: 5 October 1985 – 27 June 1992

Saint and Greavsie is a British television show in which former footballers Ian St John and Jimmy Greaves discussed current football themes such as the day's matches. It ran on ITV from 1985 to 1992.

== Format ==
Englishman Jimmy Greaves and Scotsman Ian St John were successful footballers in the 1960s, but they did not play for the same club; Greaves spent the bulk of his career with Chelsea and Tottenham Hotspur, while St John played mainly for Liverpool. Their collaboration as television football pundits started with On the Ball in World of Sport. Usually St John would host from the London studio and would cross over to Greaves, who was elsewhere, to get his views, but they were eventually based in the same studio. The segment was highly popular, leading to the commissioning of Saint and Greavsie as a programme in its own right, which began broadcasting immediately after the demise of World of Sport in September 1985. A key characteristic of the show was comedy, with St John prompting Greaves to jokes and jibes.

The show was usually about 30 minutes long and was initially broadcast shortly after noon on Saturdays, to coincide with the build-up to that afternoon's football matches. In later years it usually went on air shortly after 1pm and in its final season was increased in length to a 45-minute slot. At various points in the show the goals of previous matches would be shown. The show included features on clubs in both English and Scottish leagues and discussion of that weekend's major games, emphasising matches that ITV planned to broadcast.

The series initially had a simple opening sequence showing a rotating rudimentary CGI-image of a football pitch revolving several times, before a still of the two presenters popped up at the end; the theme tune was initially identical to that used for the "On the Ball" segment of 'World of Sport. In later years, the introduction to the show began with St John and Greaves as cigarette cards from their playing days on the opening credits, and the theme tune was changed to a piece named "Aztec Gold", composed by Silsoe, which, at the time, was being used as the theme tune for ITV's The Big Match, after being the theme tune for the station's coverage of the 1986 World Cup.

Although the show predominantly dealt with football, it also covered sports such as cricket and boxing, with interviewees including Mike Tyson and Chris Eubank.

Greaves was taken ill with severe flu just before filming the 1990 Christmas Special and was unable to take part. Instead of cancelling the recording, a member of the production team suggested using the puppet, which was based on him, from Spitting Image with Peter Brackley doing his voice.

In the 1991–92 season, the Rumbelows Cup draw was broadcast on Saint and Greavsie. The away teams for the quarter-finals were drawn by future US president Donald Trump, when the duo were in the United States to film a programme looking at how the country was preparing for the 1994 FIFA World Cup.

== Goal of the Season ==
After ITV secured the rights to show league football, the network had their own Goal of the Season award (the BBC had the rights to FA Cup matches, so their award always went to the winning goal in the FA Cup final). Every First Division club were eligible, with the best goal from each respective season chosen by the club's manager. The next week, the list was cut down to six, with the general public able to send their top three goals in order. The goal with the most votes was the winner.

In the final series, the twenty nominations were chosen by the Saint and Greavsie team, as more than one goal scored by Manchester United and Arsenal players were chosen. Goals from Second Division clubs were also included.

| Season | Scorer | Nationality | For | Against | Stadium | Competition | Date | Notes |
|---|---|---|---|---|---|---|---|---|
| 1988–89 | Alan McInally | Scotland | Aston Villa | Millwall | Villa Park | First Division | 27 August 1988 | |
| 1989–90 | Robert Rosario | England | Norwich City | Southampton | Carrow Road | First Division | 9 September 1989 | |
| 1990–91 | Roy Wegerle | South Africa | Queens Park Rangers | Leeds United | Elland Road | First Division | 20 October 1990 | |
| 1991–92 | Gary Lineker | England | Tottenham Hotspur | Porto | White Hart Lane | European Cup Winners' Cup | 23 October 1991 | |

== Cancellation and later work ==
In the summer of 1992, ITV lost the rights to broadcast top-tier English football matches as the newly formed Premier League, contracted to Sky Sports. ITV then discontinued Saint and Greavsie. The final programmes were broadcast from Sweden during Euro 92, with the pair singing "The Last Time" in the final credits and making jokes at Sky's expense.

Aside from a 1995 series Saint and Greavsie's World of Sport, the pair did not present under the name Saint and Greavsie again, but continued to link up together and remained in touch. They occasionally presented Champions League preview shows together and both remained employed by ITV for several years. Together, they hosted the discussion show Sport in Question. St John continued to be used as a co-commentator for the ITV network until the arrival of Jim Beglin, while Greaves continued to appear as a pundit and co-commentator in the Central region until 1996, when he was gradually phased out in favour of Ron Atkinson. Away from their work, Greaves and St John rarely met due to living in Essex and on the Wirral respectively, but Greaves said they had a "lovely relationship".

In 2004, Saint and Greavsie were studio guests in an episode of Fantasy Football League, when they were described as the "godfathers" of football comedy by Frank Skinner and David Baddiel. In earlier years they had been parodied in sketches on the show. St John criticised Baddiel and Skinner in his autobiography and interviews, following their appearance on the show.

== Other formats ==
In 1989, Grandslam Entertainment released Saint and Greavsie, a football trivia quiz game, on a variety of computer platforms. It was developed by Core Design. In 2006, Saint and Greavsie released a DVD quiz, featuring retro football action, with a book, Saint and Greavsie's Funny Old Games, having also since been published.

In May 2009, Setanta Sports announced that Saint and Greavsie were reforming their double act to star in a FA Cup Special on 30 May, the day of the Cup Final. The Saint and Greavsie FA Cup Special was broken up into three mini-programmes appearing throughout the build up to the Everton v Chelsea final.
