= Jessie (Joshua Kadison song) =

1993 single by Joshua Kadison

Single by Joshua Kadison

from the album Painted Desert Serenade
- Released: April 1993
- Genre: Pop
- Length: 5:19
- Label: SBK
- Songwriter: Joshua Kadison
- Producers: Peter Van Hooke; Rod Argent

Joshua Kadison singles chronology
"Jessie" (1993)	"Beautiful in My Eyes" (1994)

Music video
- "Jessie" on YouTube

"Jessie" is a song by American singer-songwriter Joshua Kadison, released in April 1993 by SBK Records as the debut and lead single from the singer's first album, Painted Desert Serenade (1993). The song was written by Kadison, and produced by Peter Van Hooke and Rod Argent. It did not become a hit in continental Europe until 1994 and in the United Kingdom until 1995. "Jessie" became a top-10 hit in Austria, Denmark, Israel and the Netherlands. In the United States, it peaked at number 26 on both the Billboard Hot 100 and Cash Box Top 100 charts. The accompanying music video was directed by Piers Plowden, depicting Kadison playing on a piano in a desert landscape.

== Content ==
The song describes the narrator's tumultuous relationship with a woman named Jessie. The person named Jessie in this song was rumored to be Sarah Jessica Parker, but this has never been confirmed and, in a 2018 appearance on Andy Cohen's Watch What Happens Live, Sarah Jessica Parker was asked about the song, and whether it is about her, and she responded with surprise, saying "I don't know who that person is... I've never met this person... That never happened, to my recollection. I'm pretty clear about who I dated." In 1997, she married actor Matthew Broderick. In a 1994 interview with Los Angeles Times, Kadison told about the song, "It's a song that a lot of people can relate to. Everybody's heart has been broken by somebody they'll always love. That's what this song is about.. It taps into a feeling that's buried in so many people."

== Critical reception ==
The song received positive reviews from music critics. AllMusic editor Bryan Buss noted that it is "about the searching title heroine and the hopeful, needing narrator who gets sucked into her longing, he paints vivid portrayals of troubled and hopeful dreamers. With lyrics like Jessie, paint your pictures/'bout how it's gonna be/by now I should know better/your dreams are never free, Kadison taps into the wanderer in all of us." Larry Flick from Billboard magazine wrote that the singer "indulges in a worldly, intelligent brand of storytelling that aims to place him among late luminaries Jim Croce and Harry Chapin. Poignant piano ballad actually is more along the lines of early Billy Joel. Sophisticated, complex production". Dave Sholin from the Gavin Report complimented the "beautiful melody and catchy chorus" of the song. In his weekly UK chart commentary, James Masterton commented, "Quite why everyone was so keen for this to be a hit I am unclear, its a pretty enough romantic ballad but nothing extremely exciting."

Pan-European magazine Music & Media said it "could tear down walls like 'Walking in Memphis' did for Marc Cohn." Alan Jones from Music Week described it as an "extremely attractive piano-led, mid-tempo ballad", noting that "along with a warm vocal style (two parts Billy Joel to one Jim Croce) Kadison has a fine melodic sense, and this lyrical song deserves to be heard." John Kilgo from The Network Forty felt that a "soulful bluesy delivery exemplifies the main strength of newcomer Joshua Kadison, who reaches new heights with this electrifying piano ballad." Gill Whyte from Smash Hits wrote, "It starts off with a lovelorn tinkly piano then in come the vocals... and he sounds exactly like Elton John! [...] Basically, this is an old-fashioned ballad, woeful in its corniness — he just croons on about Jessie and how even the cat misses her: the cat (Moses) thinks about you all the time — pur-lease!"

== Music video ==
The music video for "Jessie" was directed by Piers Plowden. It features Kadison playing on a piano outside in a desert landscape. Other scenes show him driving an open car through the same landscape or making out on a beach with a woman. VH-1 named Kadison the network's major breakthrough artist of 1993 for the "Jessie" video. The network aired it in its "What's New" category for a record-breaking 26 weeks.

== Track listing ==
- CD single
1. "Jessie" (edit) – 4:19
2. "Jessie" (album version) – 5:18
3. "When a Woman Cries" – 3:31
4. "All I Ever Ask" – 4:39

== Charts ==
=== Weekly charts ===
Chart (1993–1995)	Peak position
Australia (ARIA)	15
Austria (Ö3 Austria Top 40)	6
Belgium (Ultratop 50 Flanders)	29
Canada Top Singles (RPM)	36
Denmark (IFPI)	6
Europe (Eurochart Hot 100)	31
Europe (European AC Radio)	5
Europe (European Hit Radio)	25
Germany (GfK)	12
Iceland (Íslenski Listinn Topp 40)	13
Ireland (IRMA)	16
Israel (Israeli Singles Chart)	5
Netherlands (Dutch Top 40)	6
Netherlands (Single Top 100)	10
New Zealand (Recorded Music NZ)	15
Scottish Singles Sales (Official Charts)	12
Sweden (Sverigetopplistan)	29
Switzerland (Schweizer Hitparade)	11
UK Singles (Official Charts)	15
US Billboard Hot 100	26
US Adult Contemporary (Billboard)	11
US Top 40/Mainstream (Billboard)	23
US Cash Box Top 100	26

=== Year-end charts ===
Chart (1994)	Position
Australia (ARIA)	68
Austria (Ö3 Austria Top 40)	28
Europe (Eurochart Hot 100)	84
Germany (Media Control)	25
Netherlands (Dutch Top 40)	19
Netherlands (Single Top 100)	47
Switzerland (Schweizer Hitparade)	37
US Adult Contemporary (Billboard)	29

== Release history ==
Region	Date	Format(s)	Label(s)	Ref.
United States	April 1993	Adult contemporary radio	SBK	
United States	May 1993	Top 40 radio	SBK	
United Kingdom	February 14, 1994	7-inch vinyl; CD; cassette	SBK	
Australia	March 14, 1994	CD; cassette	SBK	
United Kingdom (re-release)	April 17, 1995	CD; cassette	SBK	
