= The Big Match =

British football television series

- Also known as: The Match (1988–1992)
- Genre: Football
- Presented by: Brian Moore (1968–1983); Elton Welsby (1983–1992)
- Starring: Jimmy Hill (1968–1973); Jim Rosenthal (1980–1983)
- Opening theme: see Theme Tunes
- Ending theme: see Theme Tunes
- Composer: see Theme Tunes
- Country of origin: United Kingdom
- Original language: English

Production
- Running time: 60 minutes
- Production company: London Weekend Television

Original release
- Network: ITV
- Release: 25 August 1968 – 26 April 1992

Related
- The Premiership

The Big Match is a British football television programme, broadcast on ITV between 1968 and 1992.

The Big Match originally launched on London Weekend Television (LWT) – the ITV regional station that served London and the Home Counties at weekends – screening highlights of Football League matches. Other ITV regions had their own shows, but would show The Big Match if they were not covering their own match – particularly often in the case of Southern and HTV. The programme was set up in part as a response to the increased demand for televised football following the 1966 FIFA World Cup and partly as an alternative to the BBC's own football programme, Match of the Day. The Big Match launched the media career of Jimmy Hill, who appeared on the programme as an analyst, and made Brian Moore one of the country's leading football commentators.

The programme was launched soon after LWT took over the ITV weekend franchise for London from ATV, which had previously shown local football highlights under the name Star Soccer. Co-presenter Jimmy Hill was also Head of Sport at LWT.

The Big Match originally screened match highlights on Sunday afternoons, while Match of the Day was broadcast on Saturday evenings. But in 1978, Michael Grade at LWT audaciously won exclusive rights to all league football coverage for ITV in a move termed "Snatch of the Day". Although the Office of Fair Trading blocked the move, the BBC was forced to allow ITV to take over the Saturday night slot in alternating seasons. This new arrangement began with the 1980–81 season.

== The Big Match theme tunes ==
The Big Match had six theme tunes during its run:

- 1968 to 1972: "Young Scene" by Keith Mansfield
- 1972 to 1973: "Cheekybird" by Don Harper
- 1973 to 1980: "La Soiree (The Evening)" by David Ordini
- 1980 to 1986: "Jubilation" by Jeff Wayne
- 1986 to 1988: "Aztec Gold" by Silsoe
- 1988 to 1992: "Goal Crazy" by Rod Argent

Aztec Gold was previously used as the theme to ITV's coverage of the 1986 World Cup, and later from 1988 until 1992 as the theme tune to Saint and Greavsie.

== Live era ==
ITV's regional-based coverage of football ended in 1983, with The Big Match becoming the sole football highlights programme on ITV. That same year, the first live league match since 1960 was shown, a First Division game on Sunday 2 October between Tottenham Hotspur and Nottingham Forest which Tottenham won 2–1. ITV's football coverage continued and expanded throughout the 1980s, particularly after ITV won exclusive league rights in 1988, after which The Big Match was renamed simply The Match.

== The Match ==
Between 1988 and 1992, the programme's main presenter was Elton Welsby, with Jim Rosenthal sometimes acting as a touchline reporter and interviewer. Former presenter Brian Moore was often the main match commentator, and on other occasions it was Alan Parry. The first live game under that title was on 30 October 1988 when Everton and Manchester United drew 1–1. Much of the coverage focused on the destiny of the First Division title, most memorably on 26 May 1989 when Arsenal's decisive 2–0 win at Liverpool won them the championship by the narrowest of margins at their opponents' expense.

ITV lost rights to the new Premier League to British Sky Broadcasting and the BBC in 1992, and the final top-flight match shown live being Liverpool's 2–0 win over Manchester United on 26 April 1992, a result that sealed the title for Leeds United, who won 3–2 at Sheffield United earlier the same day.

From the start of the 1992–93 season, Welsby left ITV Sport to work for Granada Television full-time and was replaced as presenter by Ian St John. The Match was given another new theme tune, "You Are The Number One" by Union, a theme also used for ITV's coverage of the 1992 European Championship. With the loss of the top flight to Sky Sports and the BBC, The Match focused on the League Cup, the UEFA Cup, the Cup Winners' Cup and international matches, and was shown as and when ITV had the rights to the various matches (the rights to European matches were sold on a club-by-club basis in those days, with the exception of the UEFA Champions League).

ITV retained the rights to what was left of the Football League (and retained the rights to the League Cup), but coverage of both was mainly shown on a regional basis. Many regions showed live matches on Sunday afternoons, and in many cases the programmes carried The Match branding, depending on the region:

The Central Match, The Granada Match, The West Match, The Meridian Match, The London Match (which became The Sunday Match from 1993/94), The Tyne Tees Match (which became The North East Match), Soccer Sunday (originally a name used by HTV Wales, though some years later it was adopted by many other regions).

The Central Match, The London Match and HTV Wales's Soccer Sunday all used "You Are The Number One" as their theme, and other regions may have done as well.

ITV did gain coverage of the new UEFA Champions League, but all programmes covering that competition went out under the UEFA Champions League title.

The Match underwent radical rebranding for the 1993–94 season, as Central and Grand Slam Productions took over the production contract from LWT with the changes including the introduction of a score bug. Matthew Lorenzo became the programme's main presenter, with Jim Rosenthal often hosting highlights programmes. The black and red branding, which had been in place since 1990, was replaced with a blue and silver theme. Many long-serving pundits left the programme, including Ian St John and Jimmy Greaves – though both remained involved with ITV's regional football coverage, and St John returned as a co-commentator for networked coverage from 1996.

Bob Wilson replaced Lorenzo as host from the start of the 1994–95 season, and from the start of the 1995–96 season, the programme featured a new instrumental theme. From 1996–97, an instrumental version of the hymn "Jerusalem" was used, having been used during ITV's coverage of Euro '96.

== The Big Match briefly returns ==
Between 1997 and 2001 ITV held the rights to show the FA Cup, both as highlights and live and from the start of FA Cup coverage at the beginning of 1998, ITV revived the name The Big Match for its football coverage. However, when ITV won back English top-flight football highlights in 2001, the new programme was simply called The Premiership.

In 2021, ITV won back the secondary rights to the FA Cup from BT Sport, however The Big Match branding was not used on air.

== The Big Match Revisited ==
On 7 February 2008, ITV4 began showing old editions of The Big Match in its various regional and national forms on a Thursday afternoon, hoping to cash in on the sports TV nostalgia revival headed by the ESPN Classic channel. Each edition was from the same week 25 years earlier. The first series of The Big Match Revisited ran until 15 May 2008, coinciding with the end of the 1982–83 season. The programme mainly featured London Weekend Television's The Big Match but occasionally aired programmes from Granada Television (Match Time) and Television South (The Saturday Match).

The second series began on ITV4 on 1 January 2009 and it covered the second half of the 1978–79 season. The first episode broadcast was Granada's coverage of West Bromwich Albion's 5–3 win at Manchester United on 30 December 1978. The series ran until May, concluding with the 1979 FA Cup Final. A mixture of The Big Match and Kick Off Match episodes were broadcast during the series.

A third series began on BT Sport 2 on 10 July 2017, which covered the 1976–77 season, and was immediately followed by series 4, which covered the 1974–75 season. These two series were not shown on ITV4 until 2020.

Series 5, covering the 1979–80 season made its debut on ITV4 20 February 2021. All episodes were from The Big Match. Season 6, which follows on with the 1980–81 season aired from 14 August 2021.

Following the success of 'The Big Match Revisited', ITV commissioned 'Matchtime Revisted' which followed the same format, but using episodes of the Granada Television regional show 'Match Time', presented by Elton Welsby. The first series began on ITV4 on 26 February 2022, and featured the 1981–82 season.

A seventh season of The Big Match Revisited was commissioned in 2023, and aired on ITV4 from April 2023. At 34 episodes it was the longest series to date, covering the 1977–78 season, while Series 8, looking at the 1984–85 season, started in December 2024.

Series 9, featuring 1975–76, was broadcast from May 2025. Series 10, featuring 1971-72 was broadcast from January 2026 and series 11 is due for broadcast starting October 2026, all on ITV4

The Big Match Revisited episode guide
Series	Episode	Featured Matches
Series 1 (1982/83)	1	Manchester City v Tottenham; Barnsley v Wolverhampton Wanderers, Ipswich v Manchester United
Series 1 (1982/83)	2	Liverpool v Ipswich, Celtic v Aberdeen, Coventry v Manchester City
Series 1 (1982/83)	3	Everton v Tottenham, Middlesbrough v Arsenal, Aston Villa v Watford
Series 1 (1982/83)	4	Manchester United v Liverpool, Watford v Aston Villa, Leicester v Wolverhampton Wanderers
Series 1 (1982/83)	5	Liverpool v Stoke, Sunderland v Everton, Notts County v Tottenham
Series 1 (1982/83)	6	Manchester United v Everton, Brighton and Hove Albion v Norwich City
Series 1 (1982/83)	7	West Ham v Stoke, Oldham Athletic v Fulham, Southampton v Manchester City
Series 1 (1982/83)	8	Fulham v Grimsby, West Ham v Norwich, Nottingham Forest v Southampton
Series 1 (1982/83)	9	Brighton and Hove Albion v Tottenham, West Ham v Watford, Ipswich v Aston Villa
Series 1 (1982/83)	10	Luton v Aston Villa, West Bromwich Albion v Watford, Newcastle v Blackburn
Series 1 (1982/83)	11	Brighton and Hove Albion v Sheffield Wednesday, Norwich v Sunderland, Aberdeen v Celtic, Manchester City v West Ham
Series 1 (1982/83)	12	Fulham v Leicester, Liverpool v Norwich, Luton v Swansea City
Series 1 (1982/83)	13	Tottenham v Liverpool, Southampton v Luton, Sunderland v Birmingham City
Series 1 (1982/83)	14	Fulham v Carlisle, Oldham v Leicester, Birmingham City v Tottenham, Celtic v Morton
Series 1 (1982/83)	15	Derby v Fulham, Leicester v Burnley, Bury v Wimbledon, Dundee v Dundee United
Series 2 (1979/80)	1	Manchester United 3-5 West Bromwich Albion, Arsenal 3-1 Birmingham City
Series 2 (1979/80)	2	Sheffield Wednesday 1-1 Arsenal, Stoke City v Oldham Athletic (match abandoned at HT)
Series 2 (1979/80)	3	Arsenal 2-1 Nottingham Forest, Leeds United 1-1 Manchester City
Series 2 (1979/80)	4	Manchester City 2-3 Chelsea, Fulham 2-2 Sunderland
Series 2 (1979/80)	5	Ipswich Town 0-0 Leyton Orient, Newcastle United 1-1 Wolverhampton Wanderers, Nottingham Forest 3-1 York City
Series 2 (1979/80)	6	Tottenham Hotspur 0-3 Manchester City, Middlesbrough 1-3 Nottingham Forest, Manchester United 0-2 Arsenal
Series 2 (1979/80)	7	Everton 4-1 Bristol City, Birmingham City 0-1 Leeds United
Series 2 (1979/80)	8	Leicester City 2-1 Newcastle United, Morton 2-2 Partick Thistle
Series 2 (1979/80)	9	Brentford 3-3 Watford, Sheffield United 0-1 Millwall, West Bromwich Albion 1-2 Leeds United
Series 2 (1979/80)	10	Chelsea 0-0 Liverpool, Newcastle United 5-3 Charlton Athletic, Leeds United 2-2 Norwich City
Series 2 (1979/80)	11	Tottenham Hotspur 1-1 Manchester United
Series 2 (1979/80)	12	Nottingham Forest 3-2 Southampton
Series 2 (1979/80)	13	West Ham United 5-0 Newcastle United, Cardiff City 1-3 Stoke City, Middlesbrough 2-1 Birmingham City
Series 2 (1979/80)	14	Liverpool 2-2 Manchester United, Aberdeen 1-2 Rangers
Series 2 (1979/80)	15	Leyton Orient 3-3 Brighton and Hove Albion, Leicester City 1-1 Stoke City, Cologne v Schalke, Liverpool 3-0 Arsenal
Series 2 (1979/80)	16	Tottenham Hotspur 1-1 Queens Park Rangers, Leeds United 1-0 Aston Villa, Derby County 1-2 Nottingham Forest
Series 2 (1979/80)	17	Bolton v Ipswich, West Bromwich Albion v Wolverhampton Wanderers
Series 2 (1979/80)	18	Crystal Palace 2-0 Notts County, Brighton and Hove Albion 2-1 Blackburn Rovers
Series 2 (1979/80)	19	Wrexham 1-2 Sunderland, Newcastle United 1-3 Brighton and Hove Albion
Series 2 (1979/80)	20	Arsenal v Manchester United
Series 3 (1976/77)	1	Arsenal 0-1 Bristol City, Tranmere Rovers 0-1 Chester City, Ipswich Town 3-1 Tottenham Hotspur
Series 3 (1976/77)	2	Brighton and Hove Albion 1-1 Crystal Palace, Leeds United 0-2 Manchester United, Southampton 4-1 Fulham
Series 3 (1976/77)	3	Hull City 1-3 Charlton Athletic, Bury 3-0 Brighton and Hove Albion, Nottingham Forest 6-1 Sheffield United
Series 3 (1976/77)	4	QPR 2-0 Sunderland, Luton Town 1-4 Southampton, Leicester City 4-1 Arsenal
Series 3 (1976/77)	5	Tottenham Hotspur 3-3 Everton, Bristol Rovers 1-1 Charlton Athletic, West Bromwich Albion 3-0 West Ham United
Series 3 (1976/77)	6	Fulham 1-5 Notts County, Ipswich Town 1-1 Leeds United, Aberdeen v Celtic, Leicester City 1-1 Manchester United
Series 3 (1976/77)	7	Chelsea 3-3 Wolverhampton Wanderers, Leeds United 1-3 Aston Villa, Liverpool 3-1 QPR
Series 3 (1976/77)	8	Arsenal 3-1 Manchester United, Sheffield United 2-3 Bristol Rovers, Burnley 1-3 Millwall
Series 3 (1976/77)	9	Tottenham Hotspur 2-1 West Ham United, Liverpool 2-0 Sunderland, Norwich City 3-2 Leicester City
Series 3 (1976/77)	10	Fulham 1-1 Charlton Athletic, Middlesbrough 2-0 Tottenham Hotspur, Liverpool 4-1 Birmingham City
Series 3 (1976/77)	11	Arsenal 2-3 West Ham United, Hull City 2-2 Bolton Wanderers, Manchester United 3-1 Newcastle United
Series 3 (1976/77)	12	Southampton 2-2 Manchester United, Liverpool 2-1 Oldham Athletic, Middlesbrough 4-1 Arsenal
Series 3 (1976/77)	13	Chelsea 2-2 Blackpool, Manchester United 3-1 Manchester City, Sunderland 6-0 West Ham United
Series 3 (1976/77)	14	West Ham United 2-2 Everton, Rotherham United v Crystal Palace, Manchester City 2-1 Ipswich Town
Series 3 (1976/77)	15	Chelsea 2-0 Luton Town, Leeds United 1-1 Sunderland, Liverpool 2-1 Manchester City
Series 3 (1976/77)	16	Tottenham Hotspur 1-1 Sunderland, Norwich City 2-1 Bristol City, Newcastle United 3-0 West Ham United
Series 3 (1976/77)	17	Leeds United 1-2 Manchester United
Series 3 (1976/77)	18	Chelsea 4-0 Sheffield United, Leeds United 2-0 Bristol City, Liverpool 2-1 Ipswich Town
Series 3 (1976/77)	19	West Ham United 2-2 Derby County, Manchester City 5-0 Tottenham Hotspur, Wolverhampton Wanderers 1-1 Chelsea
Series 3 (1976/77)	20	Chelsea 4-0 Hull City, Colchester United v Bradford City, Bolton Wanderers v Wolverhampton Wanderers
Series 4 (1974/75)	1	Leyton Orient 0-2 Manchester United, Norwich City 2-1 Blackpool, Stoke City 3-0 Leeds United
Series 4 (1974/75)	2	Gillingham 0-1 Charlton Athletic, Newcastle United 2-0 West Ham United, Manchester City 2-1 Leeds United
Series 4 (1974/75)	3	Fulham 0-2 York City, Manchester United 2-2 Nottingham Forest, Notts County 3-2 Southampton
Series 4 (1974/75)	4	Chelsea 0-0 Arsenal, Newcastle United 1-0 Carlisle United, Birmingham City 3-2 Derby County
Series 4 (1974/75)	5	Arsenal 2-2 Luton Town, Ipswich Town 2-0 Chelsea, Leeds United 5-1 Sheffield United
Series 4 (1974/75)	6	Arsenal 2-2 QPR, Wolverhampton Wanderers 2-0 Carlisle United, Sheffield United 2-2 Everton
Series 4 (1974/75)	7	West Ham United 3-0 Middlesbrough, Sheffield United 2-1 Carlisle United, Manchester United 4-0 Oxford United
Series 4 (1974/75)	8	West Ham United 5-2 Wolverhampton Wanderers, Birmingham City 4-0 Manchester City, Newcastle United 5-0 Chelsea
Series 4 (1974/75)	9	Crystal Palace 2-1 Charlton Athletic, Newcastle United 2-1 Manchester City, Luton Town 2-3 Burnley
Series 4 (1974/75)	10	Tottenham Hotspur 3-0 Newcastle United, Birmingham City 0-3 Stoke City, Sheffield Wednesday 4-4 Manchester United
Series 4 (1974/75)	11	Millwall 0-0 Portsmouth, Sheffield United 1-1 Arsenal, Stoke City 2-1 West Ham United
Series 4 (1974/75)	12	QPR 0-1 Burnley, Coventry City 2-1 Wolverhampton Wanderers, Ipswich Town 2-0 Middlesbrough
Series 4 (1974/75)	13	West Ham United 1-1 Swindon Town, Coventry City 1-1 Arsenal, Chelsea v Watford, Leeds United 0-0 Wimbledon
Series 4 (1974/75)	14	Arsenal 2-0 Liverpool, Southend United 1-1 Preston North End
Series 4 (1974/75)	15	Luton Town 1-0 Newcastle United, Manchester City 2-1 Everton, Norwich City 3-2 West Bromwich Albion
Series 4 (1974/75)	16	West Ham United 2-1 Queens Park Rangers, Ipswich Town 3-2 Aston Villa, Everton 1-2 Fulham
Series 4 (1974/75)	17	Tottenham Hotspur 0-3 Leicester City, Burnley 2-1 Sheffield United, Aston Villa 2-0 Manchester United
Series 4 (1974/75)	18	Charlton Athletic 2-1 Southend United, Derby County 1-2 Stoke City, Middlesbrough 3-0 Tottenham Hotspur
Series 4 (1974/75)	19	Leyton Orient 1-0 Aston Villa, Luton Town 2-1 Leeds United, Burnley 3-3 Arsenal
Series 4 (1974/75)	20	Arsenal 1-1 Stoke City, Ipswich Town 2-1 Leicester City, Carlisle United 2-0 Everton
Series 4 (1974/75)	21	Tottenham Hotspur 2-0 Chelsea, Norwich City 3-0 Nottingham Forest, Everton 2-3 Sheffield United
Series 4 (1974/75)	22	Arsenal 1-0 Tottenham Hotspur, Portsmouth 0-3 Norwich City, Luton Town 1-1 Manchester City
Series 5 (1979/80)	1	Tottenham v Nottingham Forest, Wolverhampton Wanderers v Aston Villa, Brighton v Norwich
Series 5 (1979/80)	2	Crystal Palace v Manchester City, Derby v West Bromwich Albion, Sunderland v Chelsea
Series 5 (1979/80)	3	Luton v QPR, Southampton v Nottingham Forest, Everton v Middlesbrough
Series 5 (1979/80)	4	Chelsea v Charlton, Aston Villa v Stoke, Norwich v Southampton
Series 5 (1979/80)	5	Arsenal v Liverpool, Everton v Tottenham, Notts Count v Chelsea
Series 5 (1979/80)	6	Tottenham v Manchester United, Cambridge United v QPR, Manchester City v Wolverhampton Wanderers
Series 5 (1979/80)	7	Crystal Palace v Nottingham Forest, Ipswich v Manchester City, Middlesbrough v Southampton,
Series 5 (1979/80)	8	Chelsea v Swansea, Newcastle v QPR, Liverpool v Crystal Palace
Series 5 (1979/80)	9	Manchester United v Nottingham Forest, Everton v Manchester City
Series 5 (1979/80)	10	Crystal Palace v Middlesbrough, Brighton v Manchester City, Manchester United v Arsenal
Series 5 (1979/80)	11	Tottenham v Manchester United, Birmingham City v Southampton, Halifax Town v Manchester City
Series 5 (1979/80)	12	West Ham v Watford, Nottingham Forest v West Bromwich Albion, Liverpool v Southampton
Series 5 (1979/80)	13	Swindon v Tottenham, Everton v Wigan, Arsenal v Brighton and Hove Albion
Series 5 (1979/80)	14	Derby v Manchester United, Luton v Notts County, Tottenham v Southampton
Series 5 (1979/80)	15	West Ham v Aston Villa, Everton v Ipswich
Series 5 (1979/80)	16	Crystal Palace v Manchester United, Manchester City v Bolton, Walsall v Peterborough
Series 5 (1979/80)	17	QPR v Birmingham City, Leicester v Chelsea
Series 5 (1979/80)	18	Liverpool v Arsenal, Norwich City v Manchester United, Chelsea v Notts County
Series 5 (1979/80)	19	Crystal Palace v Liverpool, Ipswich v Bolton, Leicester v Charlton
Series 5 (1979/80)	20	Chelsea v Oldham, Birmingham City v Notts County, Cardiff City v Sunderland
Series 6 (1980/81)	1	Southampton v Man City
Series 6 (1980/81)	2	Southampton v Brighton, Tottenham v Manchester United, Manchester City v Arsenal
Series 6 (1980/81)	3	Crystal Palace v Ipswich
Series 6 (1980/81)	4	Arsenal v Nottingham Forest
Series 6 (1980/81)	5	Crystal Palace v West Bromwich Albion
Series 6 (1980/81)	6	West Ham v Bolton Wanderers
Series 6 (1980/81)	7	Crystal Palace v Manchester United
Series 6 (1980/81)	8	Tottenham v Wolverhampton Wanderers, Leeds United v Arsenal, Southampton v Everton
Series 6 (1980/81)	9	Arsenal v Everton
Series 6 (1980/81)	10	Crystal Palace v Manchester City
Series 6 (1980/81)	11	Liverpool v Tottenham, Chelsea v Swansea, Middlesbrough v Aston Villa
Series 6 (1980/81)	12	Ipswich v Liverpool, Sunderland v Arsenal, Tottenham v Manchester City
Series 6 (1980/81)	13	Arsenal v Manchester United
Series 6 (1980/81)	14	Everton v Liverpool
Series 6 (1980/81)	15	Southampton v Everton
Series 6 (1980/81)	16	Manchester United v Manchester City
Series 6 (1980/81)	17	Watford v West Ham
Series 6 (1980/81)	18	Aston Villa v Manchester United, Ipswich v Tottenham, Sheffield United v Charlton
Series 6 (1980/81)	19	Tottenham v Aston Villa, Manchester United v Ipswich, Leeds v Wolves
Series 6 (1980/81)	20	Leicester v Aston Villa
Series 6 (1980/81)	21	Aston Villa v Portsmouth
Series 6 (1980/81)	22	Sunderland v Brighton, Ipswich v Manchester City, Tottenham v Liverpool
Series 6 (1980/81)	23	Norwich v Leicester, Middlesbrough v Ipswich, West Bromwich Albion v Tottenham
Series 7 (1977/78)	1	Millwall v Crystal Palace, Newcastle v Leeds, Birmingham v Manchester United
Series 7 (1977/78)	2	Chelsea v Coventry, Nottingham Forest v Derby, Middlesbrough v Newcastle
Series 7 (1977/78)	3	Arsenal v Nottingham Forest, Ipswich v Chelsea, Newcastle v West Ham"
Series 7 (1977/78)	4	Tottenham v Fulham, Manchester City v Manchester United, Leicester City v Everton
Series 7 (1977/78)	5	QPR v Manchester City, Sheffield United v Crystal Palace, West Bromwich Albion v Wolves
Series 7 (1977/78)	6	West Ham v Everton, Newcastle United v Coventry, Norwich v Arsenal
Series 7 (1977/78)	7	Leyton Orient v Tottenham, Ipswich v Newcastle, Sunderland v Brighton
Series 7 (1977/78)	8	Queens Park Rangers v Everton, Stoke City v Crystal Palace, Liverpool v Chelsea
Series 7 (1977/78)	9	Crystal Palace v Southampton, Leeds v Liverpool, Wolves v West Ham
Series 7 (1977/78)	10	Watford v Newport, Brighton v Crystal Palace, Blackpool v Luton
Series 7 (1977/78)	11	Arsenal v Birmingham City, Ipswich Town v West Ham, Manchester City v Liverpool
Series 7 (1977/78)	12	Chelsea v Nottingham Forest, Middlesbrough v Queens Park Rangers, Derby County v Everton.
Series 7 (1977/78)	13	West Ham United v West Bromwich Albion, Leeds United v Manchester City
Series 7 (1977/78)	14	Tottenham Hotspur v Brighton, Manchester United v Norwich City, Southend United v Watford
Series 7 (1977/78)	15	QPR v Manchester United, Everton v Coventry, Sunderland v Luton
Series 7 (1977/78)	16	Charlton Athletic v Sunderland, Ipswich v Aston Villa, Derby v Manchester City
Series 7 (1977/78)	17	Arsenal v Leeds, Norwich City v Liverpool, Nottingham Forest v Coventry City
Series 7 (1977/78)	18	Christmas Special; Tottenham v Crystal Palace, Liverpool v QPR, Leeds v Manchester City
Series 7 (1977/78)	19	West Ham United v Leicester City, Bristol City v Nottingham Forest, Everton v Arsenal
Series 7 (1977/78)	20	Liverpool v Chelsea, Everton v Aston Villa, Sheffield United v Arsenal
Series 7 (1977/78)	21	Luton v Oldham, Ipswich v Manchester United, Newcastle v Middlesbrough
Series 7 (1977/78)	22	Chelsea v Ipswich, Wolves v Everton, Manchester Utd v Derby
Series 7 (1977/78)	23	West Ham v QPR, Bristol Rovers v Southampton, Middlesbrough v Everton
Series 7 (1977/78)	24	Fulham v Tottenham Hotspur, Blackpool v Blackburn Rovers, Nottingham Forest v Wolves
Series 7 (1977/78)	25	Chelsea v Manchester United, Sheffield Wednesday v Port Vale, Walsall v Shrewsbury Town
Series 7 (1977/78)	26	Leyton Orient v Chelsea, Bristol Rovers v Ipswich Town
Series 7 (1977/78)	27	Oldham v Tottenham, Coventry v Birmingham, Ipswich Town v West Bromwich Albion
Series 7 (1977/78)	28	Wrexham v Arsenal, Middlesbrough v Leyton Orient
Series 7 (1977/78)	29	Queens Park Rangers v Ipswich, Bolton v Blackpool, Mansfield v Tottenham Hotspur
Series 7 (1977/78)	30	Gillingham v Wrexham, Aston Villa v Liverpool, Burnley v Tottenham Hotspur
Series 7 (1977/78)	31	Arsenal v Leyton Orient
Series 7 (1977/78)	32	West Ham United v Derby County, Nottingham Forest v Leeds United, Swansea City v Brentford
Series 7 (1977/78)	33	Tottenham Hotspur v Sunderland, Manchester United v West Ham, Leeds v Arsenal
Series 7 (1977/78)	34	West Ham v Liverpool
Series 8 (1984/85)	1	Arsenal v Chelsea, Leicester City v Newcastle United, Sheffield Wednesday v Nottingham Forest
Series 8 (1984/85)	2	Manchester United v Newcastle United, Crystal Palace v Birmingham City, Ipswich Town v Leicester City
Series 8 (1984/85)	3	West Ham United v Nottingham Forest, Norwich City v Watford, Portsmouth v Shrewsbury Town
Series 8 (1984/85)	4	Liverpool v Sheffield Wednesday, Coventry City v Arsenal, West Bromwich Albion v Manchester United
Series 8 (1984/85)	5	Southampton v Tottenham Hotspur, Manchester City v Oxford United, Queens Park Rangers v Luton Town
Series 8 (1984/85)	6	Ipswich Town v Queens Park Rangers, Coventry City v Newcastle United, Everton v Aston Villa
Series 8 (1984/85)	7	Manchester United v Tottenham Hotspur, Stoke City v West Ham United, Aston Villa v Norwich City
Series 8 (1984/85)	8	Sunderland v Queens Park Rangers, Brighton and Hove Albion v Manchester City, Sheffield Wednesday v Norwich City
Series 8 (1984/85)	9	Arsenal v Aston Villa, Bristol City v Bristol Rovers, Grimsby Town v Wolverhampton Wanderers
Series 8 (1984/85)	10	Sheffield Wednesday v Everton, Coventry City v Tottenham Hotspur
Series 8 (1984/85)	11	Watford v Tottenham Hotspur, Newcastle United v Norwich City
Series 8 (1984/85)	12	West Ham United v Southampton, Portsmouth v Oxford United, Manchester United v Ipswich Town
Series 8 (1984/85)	13	Chelsea v Manchester United, Nottingham Forest v Aston Villa, Blackburn Rovers v Huddersfield Town
Series 8 (1984/85)	14	Fulham v Sheffield Wednesday, Hereford United v Arsenal, Liverpool v Aston Villa
Series 8 (1984/85)	15	Everton v Newcastle United, Huddersfield Town v Manchester City
Series 8 (1984/85)	16	Everton v Watford, Grimsby Town v Sheffield United, Leicester City v Chelsea
Series 8 (1984/85)	17	Blackburn Rovers v Fulham, Newcastle United v Manchester United, Cambridge City v York City
Series 8 (1984/85)	18	York City v Liverpool, Everton v Telford
Series 8 (1984/85)	19	Arsenal v Manchester United, Nottingham Forest v Southampton
Series 8 (1984/85)	20	Blackburn Rovers v Manchester City, Stoke City v Tottenham Hotspur
Series 8 (1984/85)	21	Liverpool v Tottenham Hotspur, Queens Park Rangers v Ipswich Town
Series 8 (1984/85)	22	West Ham United v Tottenham Hotspur, Barnsley v Manchester City
Series 8 (1984/85)	23	Liverpool v Manchester United, Portsmouth v Birmingham City
Series 8 (1984/85)	24	Everton v Norwich City, Leeds United v Oxford United, Aberdeen v Celtic
Series 8 (1984/85)	25	Luton Town v Arsenal, Manchester City v Oldham Athletic
Series 9 (1975/76)	1	Tottenham v Middlesbrough, Luton v Hull, Aston Villa v Leeds
Series 9 (1975/76)	2	Chelsea v Carlisle, Leeds v Ipswich, Blackburn v Oldham
Series 9 (1975/76)	3	QPR v West Ham, Sunderland v Blackpool, Sheffield United v Leeds
Series 9 (1975/76)	4	Arsenal v Leicester, Middlesbrough v Stoke, Derby v Burnley
Series 9 (1975/76)	5	QPR v Manchester United, Everton v Newcastle, Wolves v Birmingham
Series 9 (1975/76)	6	Fulham v Chelsea, Aston Villa v Birmingham, Manchester City v Manchester United
Series 9 (1975/76)	7	West Ham v Everton, Coventry v Burnley, Newcastle v Tottenham
Series 9 (1975/76)	8	Crystal Palace v Grimsby, Leeds v Manchester United, Sunderland v Orient
Series 9 (1975/76)	9	Luton v Fulham, Derby v Wolves, Newcastle v Norwich
Series 9 (1975/76)	10	West Ham v Manchester United, Stoke v Newcastle, Liverpool v Derby
Series 9 (1975/76)	11	Tottenham v Wolves, Sheffield United v Manchester City, Coventry v QPR
Series 9 (1975/76)	12	QPR v Tottenham, Cambridge v Northampton, Leeds v Newcastle
Series 9 (1975/76)	13	Arsenal v Manchester United, Hull v Portsmouth, Liverpool v Coventry
Series 9 (1975/76)	14	West Ham v Arsenal, Wolves v Manchester City, Leeds v Everton
Series 9 (1975/76)	15	Chelsea v Bolton, Stoke v Aston Villa, Everton v Ipswich
Series 9 (1975/76)	16	QPR v Derby, Luton v West Brom, Sheffield United v Manchester United
Series 9 (1975/76)	17	Arsenal v QPR, Leeds v Leicester, Bolton v Sunderland
Series 9 (1975/76)	18	Tottenham v Stoke, Leicester v Sheffield United, Derby v Everton
Series 9 (1975/76)	19	Tottenham v Manchester United, Ipswich v Coventry, Burnley v Derby
Series 9 (1975/76)	20	Charlton v Portsmouth,Derby v Liverpool, Leeds v Crystal Palace
Series 9 (1975/76)	21	Chelsea v West Brom, Middlesbrough v Newcastle, Manchester United v Birmingham
Series 9 (1975/76)	22	Crystal Palace v Swindon, Newcastle United v Derby County, Norwich City v Arsenal
Series 9 (1975/76)	23	Leicester City v Manchester United, Stoke City v Sunderland, Derby County v Southend United
Series 9 (1975/76)	24	West Ham United v Derby County, Stoke City v Tottenham Hotspur, Colchester United v Cardiff City
Series 9 (1975/76)	25	Sunderland v Crystal Palace, Manchester United v Wolverhampton Wanderers, Borussia Moenchengladbach v Real Madrid.
Series 9 (1975/76)	26	Everton v Queens Park Rangers, Chelsea v Southampton, Grimsby Town v Crystal Palace
Series 9 (1975/76)	27	Arsenal v West Ham United, Notts County v Blackpool, Northampton Town v Bournemouth
Series 9 (1975/76)	28	Queens Park Rangers v Manchester City, Bolton Wanderers v Chelsea, Coventry City v Newcastle United
Series 9 (1975/76)	29	Queens Park Rangers v Middlesbrough, Ipswich Town v Manchester United, Manchester City v Derby County
Series 9 (1975/76)	30	Queens Park Rovers v Leeds United, Ipswich Town v Derby County, Yugoslavia v Wales
Series 10 (1971/72)	1	West Ham United v West Bromwich Albion, Manchester City v Leeds United, Derby County v Manchester United
Series 10 (1971/72)	2	Chelsea v Coventry, West Brom v Arsenal, Hull v Blackpool
Series 10 (1971/72)	3	Arsenal v Leeds, Sheffield United v Tottenham, Wolves v Everton
Series 10 (1971/72)	4	Tottenham v Crystal Palace, Manchester United v West Ham, Swindon v Fulham
Series 10 (1971/72)	5	West Ham v Leicester, Huddersfield v Manchester United, Wolves v Southampton
Series 10 (1971/72)	6	Chelsea v Arsenal, Norwich v Luton, Birmingham v Sunderland
Series 10 (1971/72)	7	Tottenham v Nottingham Forest, Liverpool v Huddersfield, Newcastle v Manchester United
Series 10 (1971/72)	8	Crystal Palace v West Ham, Everton v Newcastle, Nottingham Forest v Derby
Series 10 (1971/72)	9	Tottenham v Everton, Leeds v Leicester, Manchester City v Manchester United
Series 10 (1971/72)	10	Arsenal v Manchester City, Wolves v Derby, Colchester v Brentford
Series 10 (1971/72)	11	Chelsea v Tottenham, Nottingham Forest v Leeds, Luton v Portsmouth
Series 10 (1971/72)	12	West Ham v Arsenal, Leeds v West Bromwich Albion, Manchester United v Nottingham Forest
Series 10 (1971/72)	13	Arsenal v Coventry, Stoke v Manchester United, Liverpool v Derby
Series 10 (1971/72)	14	West Ham v Manchester United, Liverpool v Leeds, Derby v Chelsea
Series 10 (1971/72)	15	West Ham v Luton, Leeds v Bristol Rovers, Southampton v Manchester United
Series 10 (1971/72)	16	West Ham v Derby, Leeds v Sheffield United, Stoke v Southampton
Series 10 (1971/72)	17	Chelsea v Everton, Derby v Coventry, Luton v QPR
Series 10 (1971/72)	17	Reading v Arsenal, Huddersfield v Fulham, Birmingham v Ipswich
Series 10 (1971/72)	18	Arsenal v Derby, Norwich v Millwall
Series 10 (1971/72)	20	Tottenham v Stoke, Manchester City v Huddersfield, Ipswich v Arsenal
Series 10 (1971/72)	21	Everton v Tottenham, Huddersfield v West Ham, Birmingham v Portsmouth
Series 10 (1971/72)	22	Tottenham v Derby, Hull v Fulham, Everton v Manchester City
Series 10 (1971/72)	23	West Ham v Tottenham, Ipswich v Chelsea, Coventry v Manchester United
Series 10 (1971/72)	24	Chelsea v Crystal Palace, Liverpool v Coventry, Birmingham v Millwall
Series 10 (1971/72)	25	Brighton v Bolton, Liverpool v Ipswich, Enfield v Hendon
Series 11 (1972/73)	1	Chelsea v Leeds, Manchester United v Ipswich, Norwich v Everton
Series 11 (1972/73)	2	West Ham v Manchester United, Ipswich Town v Tottenham Hotspur, Sheffield United v Southampton
Series 11 (1972/73)	3	Tottenham v Crystal Palace, Liverpool v Wolves, Newcastle v Arsenal
Series 11 (1972/73)	4	Arsenal v Liverpool, Wolves v Manchester United, Sheffield United v Chelsea
Series 11 (1972/73)	5	Brentford v Bournemouth, Nottingham Forest v Aston Villa, Manchester United v Derby
Series 11 (1972/73)	6	QPR v Cardiff, Coventry v Chelsea, Leeds v Liverpool
Series 11 (1972/73)	7	Tottenham v Stoke City, West Bromwich Albion v Manchester United, Preston North End v Sheffield Wednesday
Series 11 (1972/73)	8	Crystal Palace v Arsenal, Sheffield United v Everton, Liverpool v Stoke
Series 11 (1972/73)	9	Arsenal v Manchester City, Liverpool v Norwich, Derby County v Sheffield United
Series 11 (1972/73)	10	West Ham v Wolverhampton Wanderers, Liverpool v Chelsea, Ipswich v Leeds
Series 11 (1972/73)	11	Crystal Palace v Leeds, Manchester City v Manchester United, Norwich v West Bromwich Albion
Series 11 (1972/73)	12	Tottenham Hotspur v Liverpool, Plymouth Argyle v Hendon, Yeovil Town v Brentford, Derby County v Arsenal
Series 11 (1972/73)	13	West Ham v Newcastle United, Norwich v Manchester United, Sheffield Wednesday v Millwall
Series 11 (1972/73)	14	Tottenham v Arsenal, Ipswich Town v Crystal Palace, Leeds United v West Ham
Series 11 (1972/73)	15	Crystal Palace v Manchester United, Manchester City v Southampton, Grimsby v Brentford
Series 11 (1972/73)	16	Tottenham v Sheffield United, Liverpool v Coventry, Birmingham v Arsenal
Series 11 (1972/73)	17	West Ham v Liverpool, Rangers v Celtic, Leeds United v Tottenham Hotspur
Series 11 (1972/73)	18	Brighton and Hove Albion v Chelsea, Chelmsford v Ipswich Town, Manchester City v Stoke City
Series 11 (1972/73)	19	Chelsea v Arsenal, Liverpool v Derby County, Huddersfield Town v Luton Town
Series 11 (1972/73)	20	Crystal Palace v Tottenham Hotspur, Wolverhampton Wanderers v Liverpool, Airdrieonians v Celtic
Series 11 (1972/73)	21	Chelsea v Ipswich Town, Derby County v Tottenham Hotspur, Everton v Millwall
Series 11 (1972/73)	22	Crystal Palace v Stoke City, Liverpool v Manchester City, Leeds United v Chelsea
Series 11 (1972/73)	23	Derby County v Leeds United, Wolverhampton Wanderers v Coventry City
Series 11 (1972/73)	24	Tottenham Hotspur v Manchester United, Birmingham City v Coventry City, Manchester City v Arsenal
Series 11 (1972/73)	25	Arsenal v Tottenham Hotspur, Stoke City v Manchester United, Slough v Walton & Hersham
Series 11 (1972/73)	26	West Ham v Arsenal, Cambridge City v Mansfield Town, Liverpool v Leicester City

In the 1990s, a similar show called The Big Match Replayed was shown late at night on ITV, repeating various editions of The Big Match from the 1970s.

== The Big Match on DVD ==
In April 2009 a series of Big Match titles were released on DVD for clubs including Manchester United and Tottenham Hotspur. Editions due to be released for Liverpool and Arsenal, entitled Match of the 70's, while containing Big Match content, was unable to be released under the name due to contractual issues.

May 2009 saw the release of further DVDs in the range, including Big Match releases for West Ham United, Newcastle United, Chelsea.

Later editions in the series include discs centered on Everton, Manchester City, Aston Villa, Wolves, Sunderland A.F.C., two volumes of QPR and Leeds United matches and the England national team.

As well as selected match highlights, the bonus content includes much additional footage including the Fun Spot. Viewers' Letters, and the surreal sight of Kevin Keegan, Mick Channon and Elton John presenting the show in December 1976. Other highlights include clips of Peter Taylor talking about his ill-fated book on Brian Clough (which led to their split), a 38-year-old Martin Peters, Brazil 1970 and a clip of a 21-year-old Diego Maradona.
