= Yvette Vickers =

American actress, pin-up model and singer (1928–2010)

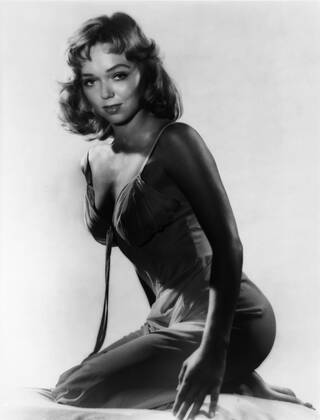
- Vickers in 1958
- Born: Yvette Iola Vedder; August 26, 1928; Kansas City, Missouri, U.S.
- Died: c. 2010 (aged 81–82); Beverly Hills, California, U.S.
- Body discovered: April 27, 2011
- Education: UCLA
- Occupations: Actress; pin-up model; singer
- Years active: 1950–1990
- Spouses: Don Prell (m. 1953; div. 1957) Leonard Burns (m. 1959; div. 1961) Tom Howland (m. 1967; div. 1969)

Yvette Vickers (born Yvette Iola Vedder; August 26, 1928 – c. 2010) was an American actress, pin-up model and singer. She was chosen as Playmate of the Month for July 1959.

== Early life and early career ==
Vickers was born in Kansas City, Missouri, the daughter of jazz musician Charles Vedder. During her youth, she traveled with her parents to their various performances. She attended the University of California, Los Angeles, and studied journalism. While at UCLA, she took a class in acting and discovered that she enjoyed it, so she changed her major to drama. She began making television commercials. She later moved to New York City to model for White Rain shampoo advertisements, but she eventually returned to California to pursue an acting career.

== Career ==
Her first movie appearance is listed under the name Yvette Vedder in Sunset Boulevard (1950), although she was not listed in the production credits. She made her first movie appearance under the Vickers name in Short Cut to Hell (1957), which was directed by James Cagney. In the same year, she starred in American International Pictures' Reform School Girl. Her image was used for the movie's theatrical poster, and it depicted her and Gloria Castillo fighting each other. The poster has subsequently become a collector's item.

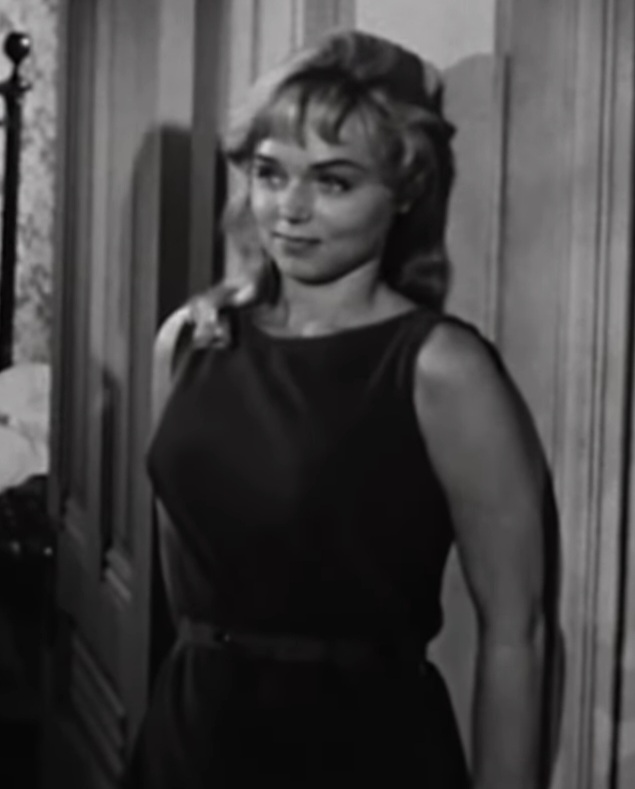
Vickers in Attack of the Giant Leeches (1959)

In 1958, she appeared in Attack of the 50 Foot Woman as Honey Parker, town floozy who has an affair with Harry Archer (William Hudson), who is married to heiress and title character Nancy Archer (Allison Hayes). The following year she played the role of Liz Walker in Attack of the Giant Leeches. During the same period, she made a number of appearances on TV shows, including an episode of One Step Beyond titled "The Aerialist", aired on April 28, 1959, and an episode of Bat Masterson titled "Double Trouble in Trinidad," aired January 7, 1959 as "Jessie Simmons."

She appeared as Playboy's Playmate of the Month in the July 1959 issue. Her centerfold was photographed by Russ Meyer. She also appeared in several other men's magazines. Her film roles began to decrease around this time. She did play some small parts in films from 1962 onward, including a small role in Hud (1963). Her last role was in Evil Spirits, a 1991 horror film.

Vickers was also a singer. In the 1990s, she released a jazz tribute to her parents on CD titled A Tribute to Charlie and Maria. In 2005, she visited Canada for the first time to appear at the Toronto Classic Movie Festival. She appeared with interviewer Tom Weaver on the audio commentary track of the 2007 DVD release of Attack of the 50 Foot Woman. She had been writing her autobiography before her death.

== Personal life ==
In 1953, Vickers married Don Prell, and they were divorced by 1957. Her second marriage was to Leonard Burns in 1959, divorcing in 1961. Her third and final marriage was to Tom Howland from 1967 to 1969. Vickers had no children. She had a long-term relationship with actor Jim Hutton. She also had a recurring relationship with actor Cary Grant in the late 1950s and early 1960s.

== Death ==
Vickers was last seen alive in 2010. She had withdrawn from her extended family and friends. Her mummified body was discovered by actress and neighbor Susan Savage on April 27, 2011, in her home at 10021 Westwanda Drive, Beverly Hills. The month of her death is unknown, but forensic scientists concluded that she may have been dead for as long as a year before her body was discovered. There were no signs of foul play. Her autopsy was completed by the Los Angeles County Medical Examiner, who ruled her cause of death to be heart failure resulting from coronary artery disease.

Playboy mogul Hugh Hefner issued statements expressing his sorrow and outrage at her lonely death. Her remains were cremated, and her half-brother Perry Palmer retained possession of her ashes.

== Filmography ==
Year	Title	Role	Notes
1950	Sunset Boulevard	Giggling Girl on Phone at Party	Uncredited
1950	The Sound of Fury	Dance Floor Extra	Uncredited
1957	Reform School Girl	Roxy	
1957	Short Cut to Hell	Daisy	
1957	The Sad Sack	Hazel (WAC)	Uncredited
1958	Juvenile Jungle	Kitten	Uncredited
1958	Attack of the 50 Foot Woman	Honey Parker	
1958	The Saga of Hemp Brown	Amelia Smedley	Uncredited
1959	I Mobster	The Blonde	
1959	Attack of the Giant Leeches	Liz Walker	
1962	Pressure Point	Drunken Woman	Uncredited
1963	Hud	Lily Peters	
1963	Beach Party	Blonde Yoga Girl	Uncredited
1971	What's the Matter with Helen?	Mrs. Barker	
1976	Vigilante Force	Unnamed Blonde Woman	Uncredited
1990	Evil Spirits	Neighbor	(final film role)

== See also ==
- List of people in Playboy 1953-1959

Virginia Gordon	Eleanor Bradley	Audrey Daston	Nancy Crawford	Cindy Fuller	Marilyn Hanold
Yvette Vickers	Clayre Peters	Marianne Gaba	Elaine Reynolds	Donna Lynn	Ellen Stratton
