= Beautiful in My Eyes =

1994 single by Joshua Kadison

Single by Joshua Kadison

from the album Painted Desert Serenade
- B-side: "All I'll Ever Ask"
- Released: February 1994
- Genre: Pop
- Length: 4:07
- Label: SBK; ERG
- Songwriter: Joshua Kadison
- Producers: Peter Van Hooke; Rod Argent

Joshua Kadison singles chronology
"Jessie" (1993)	"Beautiful in My Eyes" (1994)	"Picture Postcards from L.A." (1994)

"Beautiful in My Eyes" is a song by American singer-songwriter Joshua Kadison. It was written by Kadison and produced by Peter Van Hooke and Rod Argent. Released in February 1994, by SBK and ERG, as the second single from his debut album, Painted Desert Serenade (1993), it surpassed the performance of his debut single and breakout hit "Jessie", reaching No. 19 on the US Billboard Hot 100 and charting in four other countries, including Australia, where it peaked at No. 5. In 1995, it was re-released in the United Kingdom, reaching the top 40 and peaking at No. 37 on the UK Singles Chart.

== Background ==
Kadison described the song as being about "a love that just lasts forever, and you'll always be beautiful in my eyes."

== Critical reception ==
Larry Flick from Billboard magazine wrote, "Kadison follows the slow-growing 'Jessie' with another easy-going, piano-driven pop ballad wrapped with sugary, romantic prose and gospel-spiked background vocals. Kadison's earnest, wide-eyed performance keeps things from flying too far over the top. Song will test his base at top 40 radio, although it is an easy bet for immediate AC action." Fell and Rufer from the Gavin Report remarked that it was released on the one-year anniversary of the release of his first single, complimenting it as a "fabulous production that builds to a string-laden climax." A reviewer from Music Week gave it three out of five, commenting, "Another obvious smash from this softcore Billy Joel. Despite the comparative UK failure of 'Jessie', one of these songs is going to take off here, but which one?"

== Charts ==
=== Weekly chart ===
Chart (1994–1995)	Peak position
Australia (ARIA)	5
Canada Top Singles (RPM)	20
Canada Adult Contemporary (RPM)	3
Europe (Eurochart Hot 100)	84
Germany (GfK)	55
New Zealand (Recorded Music NZ)	23
Scottish Singles Sales (Official Charts)	93
Scottish Singles Sales (Official Charts) 1995 re-release	33
UK Singles (Official Charts)	65
UK Singles (Official Charts) 1995 re-release	37
US Billboard Hot 100	19
US Adult Contemporary (Billboard)	4
US Top 40/Mainstream (Billboard)	28
US Cash Box Top 100	15

=== Year-end chart ===
Chart (1994)	Position
Canada Adult Contemporary (RPM)	21
US Billboard Hot 100	79
US Adult Contemporary (Billboard)	14

== Release history ==
Region	Date	Format(s)	Label(s)	Ref.
United States	February 1994	Adult contemporary radio	SBK; ERG	
United States	March 1994	Top 40 radio	SBK; ERG	
Australia	November 14, 1994	CD; cassette	SBK; ERG	
