= The Pearl (film) =

1945 film by Emilio Fernández

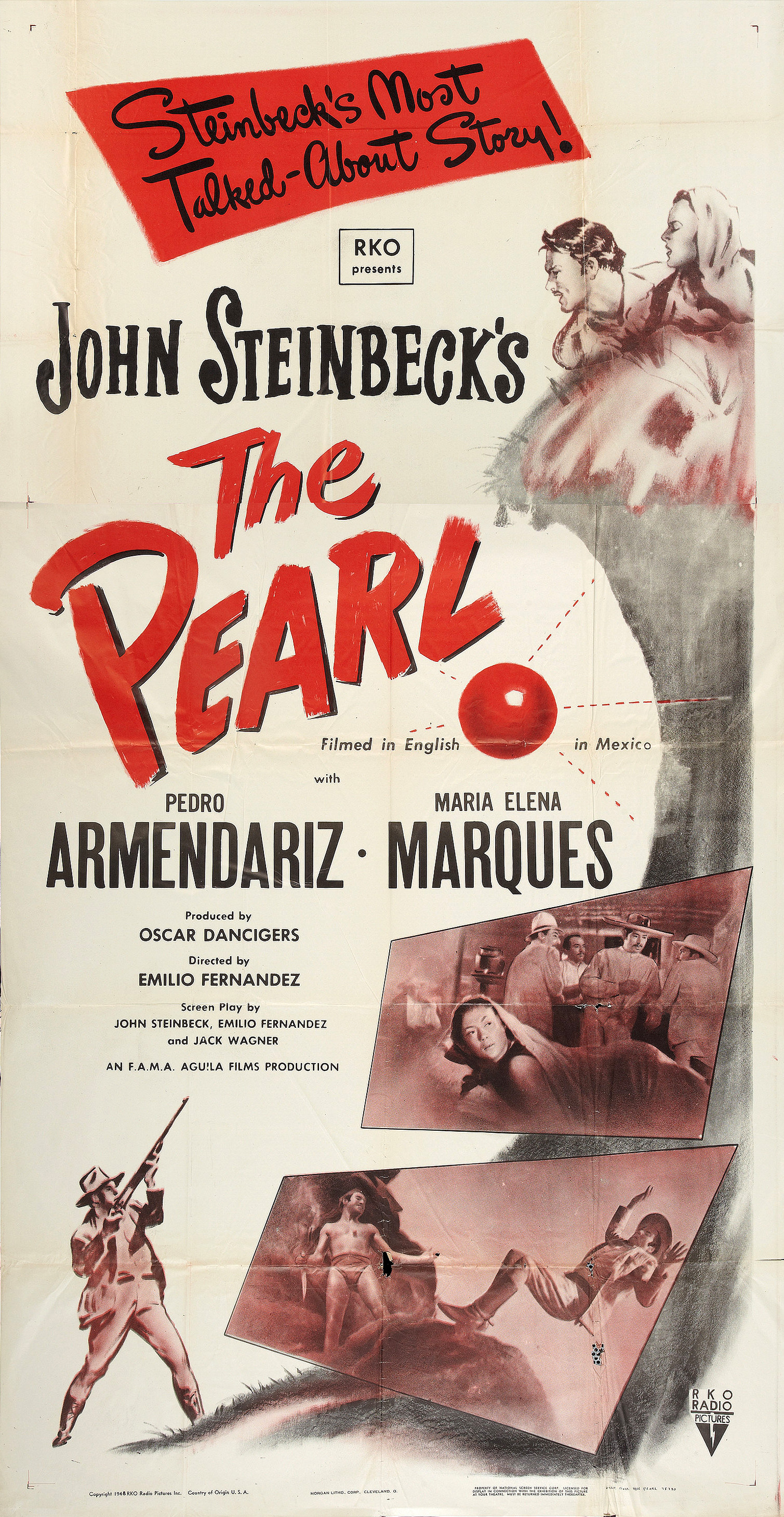
- U.S. theatrical release poster
- Directed by: Emilio Fernández
- Screenplay by: John Steinbeck; Emilio Fernández; Jack Wagner
- Based on: The Pearl by John Steinbeck
- Produced by: Oscar Dancigers
- Starring: Pedro Armendáriz; María Elena Marqués; Fernando Wagner; Charles Rooner
- Cinematography: Gabriel Figueroa
- Edited by: Gloria Schoemann
- Music by: Antonio Díaz Conde
- Production companies: Águila Films; RKO Radio Pictures; Film Asociados Mexico-Americanos
- Distributed by: RKO Radio Pictures; Películas Mexicanas (Peli-Mex)
- Release dates: September 12, 1947 (Mexico); February 17, 1948 (United States)
- Running time: 77 minutes
- Countries: Mexico; United States
- Languages: 2 versions: Spanish; English
- Budget: $300,000

La perla (The Pearl) is a 1947 Mexican-American film directed by Emilio Fernández. It is based on the 1947 novella The Pearl by John Steinbeck, who also co-wrote the screenplay along with Fernández and Jack Wagner.

In 2002, the film was selected for preservation in the United States National Film Registry by the Library of Congress as being "culturally, historically, or aesthetically significant".

== Plot ==
In a fishing village in La Paz, Mexico, pearl fisherman Kino and his wife Juana are in anguish because their infant son Coyotito was stung by a scorpion. The nearest doctor, a foreigner, refuses to treat him without adequate payment and he is taken instead to a curandero. The doctor does not want anything to do with the natives. Later, the doctor and his brother, a loan shark, meet Kino after he finds a valuable pearl and they decide to steal it from him.

One day, Kino stumbles upon a majestic pearl. He immediately grabs it and returns to his wife.

Juana, Kino's wife, is convinced that the pearl only brings bad luck and tries to convince Kino to return it to the sea. But Kino refuses to listen, hoping that the pearl will change their lives once he sells it. To Juana, the pearl represents death but for Kino, it represents freedom. Now that Kino is "rich" he wants to buy a gun and new shoes. He also wants his son to be able to read. Kino believes that if his son acquires knowledge, they will also gain knowledge, which will set them free. The villagers follow the family around with the pearl and play music while attempting to get a look at the pearl. The doctor that had refused to help Coyotito tries to get the Pearl from the family by claiming he will help the already healthy infant son in exchange for the much more valuable pearl.

Once Kino and his family head to town, the dealers make him a deal that is not near the actual worth for the pearl, and try to convince Kino that the pearl is worthless and the deal they offer is the best he will get. Kino does not accept the deal and decides to go to the capital instead. Kino starts drinking with these men who are only with him to get him intoxicated enough to get the pearl. But when the men try and rob him he does not have the pearl. Juana had kept the Pearl on her as she knew something would happen to him.

Later on his brother comes to help and helps Kino's family escape through the night. The family is then chased, only confirming the predictions of Juana.

At one point Juana takes the pearl from Kino because she wants to throw it into the ocean. Kino chases after her, and hits her. The two decide that they are going to run away. They try to take a boat but it tips over before they are able to get very far. As they flee they are followed by two natives and a man on a horse. Juana eventually gets very tired and she wants to be left alone. She does not have shoes, making her feet very bloody. Kino refuses to leave her and she goes with him because he is her husband. Eventually the men have them trapped on a cliff. One of the men fires a shot which kills the baby. At the end Kino and Juana throw the pearl off of the highest ledge to get rid of it.

== Cast ==
- Pedro Armendáriz as Kino
- María Elena Marqués as Juana
- Fernando Wagner as Dealer 1
- Gilberto Gonzálezas Aid 1
- Charles Rooner as Doctor
- Juan García as Aid 2
- Alfonso Bedoya as Godfather
- Raúl Lechuga as Dealer 2
- Max Langler as Peasant

== Reception ==
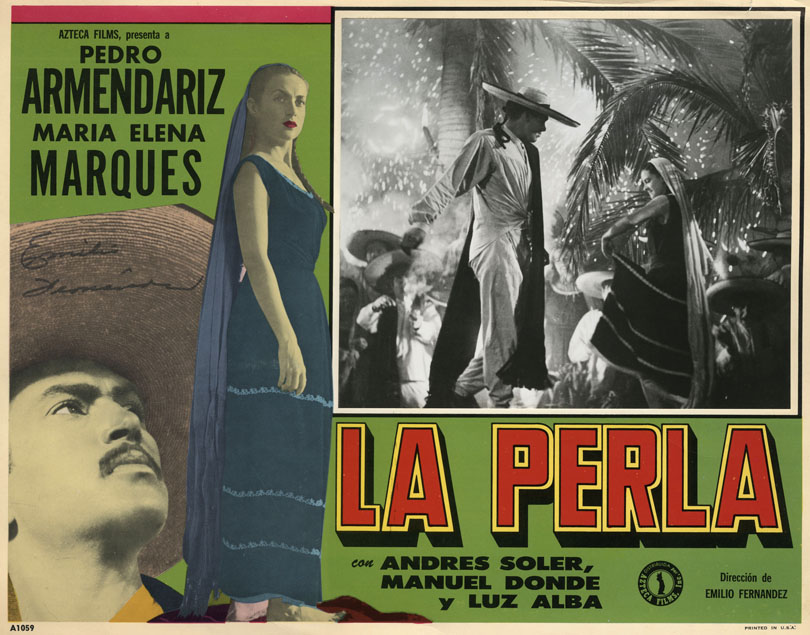
Spanish-language poster

=== Critical response ===
When the film was released, Bosley Crowther, film critic for The New York Times, liked the film, writing, "An exceptional motion picture, both in content and genesis, is the beautiful and disturbing filmization of John Steinbeck's novelette, The Pearl, which reached an appropriate showcase at the Sutton Theatre yesterday. Exceptional it is in genesis by virtue of the fact that it was made in Mexico by a Mexican company with Mexican actors who speak English throughout. And extraordinary it is in content through the benefit of a story of primitive power, told with immaculate integrity through an eloquent camera." the film is viewed with cultural importance and is renowned.

Distributed by RKO Pictures, it became the first Mexican-produced feature film to receive a wide, first-run general release in the United States. The film was selected for preservation by the United States National film registry in 2002.

=== Accolades ===
==== Venice Film Festival - 1947 ====
- Emilio Fernández "Golden Lion"

==== Premio Ariel - 1948 ====
Awarded

- Emilio Fernández "Golden Ariel"
- Pedro Armendáriz (actor)
- Juan García (supporting actor)
- Gabriel Figueroa (photography)

Nominated

- Gilberto Diego González (supporting actor)
- María Elena Marqués (actress)
- Gloria Schoemann (editing)
- Antonio Díaz Conde (score)
- Emilio Fernández (screenplay)
- Emilio Fernández (director)

==== Golden Globe - 1949 ====
- Gabriel Figueroa (photography)

==== Madrid Film Festival - 1949 ====
- Gabriel Figueroa (photography)
