= Gloria Castillo =

American actress (1933–1978)

- Born: March 3, 1933; Belen, New Mexico
- Died: October 24, 1978 (aged 45); Los Angeles, California
- Occupations: Stage, film, television actress
- Spouse: Ellis Kadison
- Children: Joshua Kadison

Gloria Castillo (March 3, 1933 – October 24, 1978) was an American stage and film actress of the 1950s and a businesswoman.

== Early years ==
Castillo was born in Belen, New Mexico. She was the daughter of Mr. and Mrs. R.C. Castillo, and she graduated from Belen High School. Her first acting experience came in a production of The Man Who Came to Dinner in high school. She graduated from the University of New Mexico in June 1954, majoring in music, drama, and education. She appeared in a production of the play Late Love in July 1954 at the Little Theater in Albuquerque, New Mexico and later at the Pasadena Playhouse in Pasadena, California.

== Television ==
Castillo was signed by MGM production manager Harry Joe Brown in 1954. She first appeared on television on the General Electric Theater (1954) in the episode I'm A Fool. Later she was in episodes of Disneyland (1959), The Millionaire (1959), Zorro (1959), and Bat Masterson (1960).

== Film ==
Castillo's first movie roles were in 1955 in The Night of the Hunter and The Vanishing American. She was one of 126 women selected to be interviewed for a part in Runaway Daughters (1956), and she was signed as soon as she read for the part. Most frequently Castillo can be seen in sci-fi and B-movie films made in the late 1950s. Some of the titles in which she appears are Invasion of the Saucer Men (1957), Reform School Girl (1957) and Teenage Monster (1958).

== Clothing business ==
In the 1960s, Castillo and her husband began Chessa Davis, a women's clothing company. Skirts designed by her were featured in fashion magazines and sold in department stores.

== Personal life ==
Castillo married Hollywood writer, producer, and director Ellis Kadison. Her brother is actor Leo Castillo. Her second child is singer-songwriter Joshua Kadison.

== Death ==
Castillo died on October 24, 1978, at the age of 45, from oropharyngeal cancer. Joshua Kadison's song "Mama's Arms," which appears on his debut album Painted Desert Serenade, was inspired by his late mother.

== Films ==
- The Night of the Hunter (1955) - Ruby
- The Vanishing American (1955) - Yashi
- Runaway Daughters (1956) - Angela Forrest
- Invasion of the Saucer Men (1957) - Joan Hayden
- Reform School Girl (1957) - Donna Price
- Teenage Monster (1958) - Kathy North
- The Light in the Forest (1958) - Regina (uncredited)
- You've Got to Be Smart (1967) - Connie Jackson (final film role)

== Selected Television Appearances ==
- Alfred Hitchcock Presents (1958) (Season 3 Episode 22: "The Return of the Hero") - Lili
