= Live from Abbey Road =

British television series

- Created by: Michael Gleason; Peter Van Hooke
- Starring: Various Artists
- Country of origin: United Kingdom
- No. of series: 5
- No. of episodes: 48

Production
- Running time: 60 minutes

Original release
- Network: Channel 4
- Release: January 2007 – present

Live from Abbey Road is a 12-part, one-hour performance series/documentary that began filming its first season during 2006 at Abbey Road Studios in London. Season 2 was filmed between 2007 and 2008, season 3 was filmed in 2009 and Season 4 was filmed in 2011. The series features a total of 128 musical artists to date (about 32 per Season) -- usually two or three per show, performing up to five songs per session. The sessions are recorded without a live audience. Shot in HD video with the occasional use of 35 mm lenses, the producers have sought to record performances which "look like a movie and sound like a record".

== Broadcast licenses ==
The series began broadcasting on Channel 4 / More 4 in the United Kingdom in January 2007 under a license from Channel 4. Since season 2 the series has been licensed for broadcast in 27 countries around the world, including:

- ZDF KULTUR (Germany)
- EBS (South Korea)
- Sundance Channel (United States)
- Metro TV (Indonesia)
- TV2 (Malaysia)
- NHK (Japan)
- HOT Family (Israel)
- STAR World (Asia)
- RÚV (Iceland)
- Creative Networks (Italy)
- Okto (Singapore)
- Canadian Broadcasting Corporation (Canada)
- Canvas (Belgium)
- Sony Entertainment Television (Latin America)
- IntraCommunications (Russia)
- Kanal 5 (Sweden)
- Dream TV (Turkey)
- Once TV (Mexico)
- Australian Broadcasting Corporation (Australia)
- Animax (Latin America)

The series is distributed for broadcast by Fremantle Media. The series is licensed to 112 territories in total.

== Production ==
Live from Abbey Road Limited is an independent production company formed by the series' producer, Michael Gleason. The series is produced under a multi year license from EMI, owner of Abbey Road Studios. The second half of Season 4 aired in the UK from November 2011.

== Musicians ==
The series features famous musicians and groups from various genres, spanning from rock, heavy metal, electronic, pop and even jazz and blues. The artists featured spend much of the day at Abbey Road rehearsing and performing. Many have their own mixing desk and sound technicians on site. The idea is to capture the sound created during the production of a record, and to film the process without an audience, typical of the atmosphere in a recording studio.

=== Series 1 ===
1. Snow Patrol, Madeleine Peyroux and Red Hot Chili Peppers
2. Paul Simon, Corinne Bailey Rae and Primal Scream
3. Craig David, James Morrison and Dave Matthews
4. Amos Lee, David Gilmour and Randy Crawford & Joe Sample
5. The Kooks, Wynton Marsalis and Muse
6. The Zutons, Shawn Colvin, Nerina Pallot and Ray Lamontagne
7. Kasabian, Josh Groban and The Good, the Bad & the Queen
8. Gnarls Barkley, The Feeling and The Killers
9. Dr. John, LeAnn Rimes and Massive Attack
10. Jamiroquai, Damien Rice and Goo Goo Dolls
11. Natasha Bedingfield, Gipsy Kings and Iron Maiden
12. John Mayer, Richard Ashcroft and Norah Jones

=== Series 2 ===
The second series was broadcast in the UK between 27 June 2008 and 13 September 2008.

1. Mary J. Blige, Dashboard Confessional and James Blunt
2. Sheryl Crow, Hard-Fi and Diana Krall
3. Stereophonics, Colbie Caillat and Joan Armatrading
4. Panic! at the Disco, David Gray and Suzanne Vega
5. The Hoosiers, The Black Keys and Manu Chao
6. Matchbox Twenty, The Script and Def Leppard
7. Rascal Flatts, Kate Nash, Herbie Hancock
8. The Kills, Sara Bareilles and The Fratellis
9. The Subways, Gnarls Barkley and Herbie Hancock
10. Elbow, MGMT and Alanis Morissette
11. Justin Currie, Ben Harper and Bryan Adams
12. Teddy Thompson, Martha Wainwright and Brian Wilson

=== Series 3 ===
The third series began airing in the UK on 11 October 2009.

1. The Killers, Florence and the Machine and Chairlift
2. Antony & the Johnsons, The Enemy, and Paloma Faith
3. The Gossip, The Mars Volta and Friendly Fires
4. Noisettes, Lyle Lovett and Doves
5. Mika, La Roux and Bloc Party
6. Fleet Foxes, PJ Harvey and John Parish and Manchester Orchestra
7. Seal, Imelda May and Sugarland
8. Counting Crows, Melody Gardot and Hockey
9. Yusuf Islam, The Fray and White Lies
10. Green Day, Bat For Lashes and Starsailor
11. Michael Bublé, The Temper Trap and Little Boots
12. A Tribute to the Beatles' Abbey Road album

=== Series 4 ===
Began broadcast in the UK on Channel 4 in June 2011 and continued until December 2011. The series was also aired around the rest of the world from January 2012.

1. Raphael Saadiq and Noah and the Whale
2. Blondie and Anna Calvi
3. Beady Eye and James Blake
4. Rumer and The Villagers
5. Kaiser Chiefs and Glasvegas
6. Brandon Flowers and Lykke Li
7. Laura Marling and Ryan Adams
8. The Pierces and Dark Dark Dark
9. Feist and Foster the People
10. The Kooks and Viva Brother
11. Gregg Allman and Ed Sheeran
12. Best Unseen Footage

=== Series 5 ===
International broadcast from November 2012

1. Jamiroquai, Foster the People, Kate Nash, Gipsy Kings, Dashboard Confessional
2. The Fratellis, Glasvegas, Matchbox 20, The Kills, Stereophonics, Primal Scream and Panic! at the Disco
3. Feist, Antony & the Johnsons, Corinne Bailey Rae, Manu Chao, Gnarls Barkley and Wynton Marsalis
4. Ray Lamontagne, Sara Bareilles, Nerina Pallot, Sheryl Crow and The Script
5. Dave Matthews, Norah Jones, Suzanne Vega and Gregg Allman
6. Alanis Morissette, LeAnn Rimes, Colbie Caillat, Shawn Colvin, Randy Crawford and Joe Sample
7. Ryan Adams, Anna Calvi, Ben Harper, Amos Lee, Seal, Damien Rice
8. Wynton Marsalis, Diana Krall, Madeleine Peyroux and Dr. John
9. Green Day, The Feeling, The Hoosiers, The Subways, Beady Eye and Massive Attack
10. Red Hot Chili Peppers, White Lies, The Zutons, Hockey, The Mars Volta, Hard-Fi, The Good, the Bad & the Queen and Starsailor
11. Gossip, Little Boots, James Blunt, Craig David, Villagers, James Morrison, Chairlift, Mary J Blige, Bryan Adams and John Mayer
12. Ed Sheeran, Brian Wilson, Gnarls Barkley, Paul Simon and Michael Bublé

=== Abbey Road Studios: In Session ===
Broadcast on Channel 4 from October & November 2012

1. Paul Weller Live Concert
2. The Maccabees, Django Django
3. The Civil Wars, Kyle Eastwood
4. The Vaccines, Jake Bugg
5. Foals, alt-J
6. First Aid Kit, Kristina Train
7. Biffy Clyro, Two Door Cinema Club
8. Best Unseen Footage

=== Live From Abbey Road CLASSICS ===
Broadcast on Channel 4 from June & July 2015
