= Painted Desert Serenade =

Studio album by Joshua Kadison
- Released: May 18, 1993
- Studio: Abbey Road, Westside (London, England); Red House (Bedfordshire, England); The Mill (Cookham, England); Music Grinder (Hollywood, California); Track Record, Pacifique (North Hollywood, California)
- Length: 36:51
- Label: SBK
- Producer: Rod Argent; David Kershenbaum; Peter Van Hooke

Joshua Kadison chronology
Painted Desert Serenade (1993)	Delilah Blue (1995)

Painted Desert Serenade is the debut studio album by American pianist/singer-songwriter Joshua Kadison, released in 1993 on SBK (a subsidiary of Capitol Records). It features two singles, both of which reached the top 30 on the US Billboard Hot 100: "Jessie" peaked at number 26, while "Beautiful in My Eyes" reached number 19 in 1994. The album was certified Gold in the United States in August 1994, and Platinum the following April.

== Critical reception ==
Professional ratings
Review scores
Source	Rating
AllMusic	3/5 stars

Reviewing the album for AllMusic, Bryan Buss called it "chock full of odes to finding romance, longing for romance and losing romance". Music & Media wrote, "Whereas most singer/songwriters operate in the cult hero circle, Kadison has an unmistakable ACE potential. The single Jessie could tear down walls like 'Walking in Memphis' did for Marc Cohn. Those who even think that that's too left of centre should recognise that his voice comes close to Billy Joel and most of all to Elton John. The track 'Beau's All Night Radio Love Line' is the finest about this delicate subject since Ben Vaughn's 'The Apology Line'."

== Track listing ==
All songs written by Joshua Kadison.

1. "Jessie" – 5:19
2. "Painted Desert Serenade" – 2:56
3. "Beau's All Night Radio Love Line" – 4:26
4. "Invisible Man" – 4:57
5. "Mama's Arms" – 3:00
6. "Beautiful in My Eyes" – 4:07
7. "Picture Postcards from LA" – 4:33
8. "When a Woman Cries" – 3:31
9. "Georgia Rain" – 4:03

== Personnel ==
- Joshua Kadison – vocals, acoustic piano
- Rod Argent – keyboards (1, 3, 4, 6, 7), Hammond B3 organ (8)
- Phil Parlapiano – accordion (2)
- CJ Vanston – Hammond B3 organ (9)
- Mark Cresswell – guitars (1), acoustic guitar (6, 7)
- Tim Pierce – guitars (2, 9)
- Clem Clempson – acoustic guitar (3, 4, 8), 12-string guitar (3), mandolin (3), electric guitar (7)
- Tim Renwick – electric guitar (8)
- John Pierce – bass guitar (2, 3, 9)
- John Giblin – acoustic bass (4), bass guitar (8)
- Peter Van Hooke – drums (1, 3, 6, 7), percussion (1, 3, 4, 6–8)
- Denny Fongheiser – drums (2, 9)
- Ian Thomas – drums (4)
- Neal Wilkinson – drums (8)
- Martin Ditcham – additional percussion (1), percussion (4, 7, 8)
- Frank Ricotti – congas (1, 7), additional percussion (1), percussion (4, 7)
- Susie Hanson – viola (2)
- Paul Jones – harmonica (3)
- Richard Morgan – oboe (4)
- Lance Ellington – harmony vocals (5)
- Carol Kenyon – harmony vocals (5)
- Ruby Turner – harmony vocals (5)
- Tessa Niles – backing vocals (7)
- Gene Miller – backing vocals (9)

String Quartet (Track 4)

- Rod Argent – arrangements
- Gavyn Wright – conductor, violin
- Roger Smith – cello
- George Robertson – viola
- Wilfred Gibson – violin

Strings (Tracks 6 & 8)

- Rod Argent – arrangements
- Gavyn Wright – conductor
- Chris Laurence – double bass
- Paul Kegg, Ben Kennard, Helen Liebmann and Roger Smith – celli
- Susie Hansen, Andrew Parker, George Robertson, Robert Smissen and Stephen Tees – viola
- Mark Berrow, Ben Cruft, Roger Garland, Wilfred Gibson, Roy Gillard, Tim Good, Rita Manning, Peter Oxer, Bill Penham, Barry Wilde, David Woodcock and Gavyn Wright – violin

Choir (Track 6)

- Rod Argent, Adele Bertei, Lance Ellington, Carol Kenyon, David Lasley, Ian Shaw, Helen Terry and Ruby Turner

Choir (Track 9)

- Sherwood Ball, Carmen Carter, Kathy Hazzard, Valerie Mayo, Arnold McCuller, Joseph Powell, Carmen Twillie and Fred White

== Production ==
- Brian Koppelman – A&R
- Rod Argent – producer (1, 3–8)
- Peter Van Hooke – producer (1, 3–8)
- David Kershenbaum – mixing (1–3, 6, 7, 9), producer (2, 9)
- Simon Smart – engineer (1, 3–8)
- Kevin Smith – mixing (1–3, 6, 7, 9), engineer (2, 9)
- John Kurlander – string recording (4, 6, 8)
- Rob Eaton – mixing (4, 5, 8)
- Bob Ludwig – mastering at Masterdisk (New York, NY)
- Nick Bode – art direction, design, management
- Annalisa Pessin – photography

== Charts ==
=== Weekly charts ===
Chart (1994–1995)	Peak position
Australian Albums (ARIA)	2
Austrian Albums (Ö3 Austria)	4
Dutch Albums (Album Top 100)	25
German Albums (Offizielle Top 100)	3
New Zealand Albums (RMNZ)	1
Norwegian Albums (VG-lista)	5
Scottish Albums (OCC)	54
Swiss Albums (Schweizer Hitparade)	7
UK Albums (OCC)	45
US Billboard 200	69

=== Year-end charts ===
Chart (1994)	Position
Austrian Albums (Ö3 Austria)	22
Dutch Albums (Album Top 100)	86
German Albums (Offizielle Top 100)	14
Swiss Albums (Schweizer Hitparade)	13

Chart (1995)	Position
Australian Albums (ARIA)	15
New Zealand Albums (RMNZ)	9

== Certifications ==
Region	Certification	Certified units/sales
United States (RIAA)	Platinum	1,000,000^{^}
Australia (ARIA)	Platinum	70,000^{^}
Norway (IFPI Norway)	Gold	25,000^{*}
^{*} Sales figures based on certification alone.^{^} Shipments figures based on certification alone.
