= Peter Van Hooke =

English drummer (born 1950)

Pete Van Hooke
- Born: Peter Van Hooke; 6 April 1950 (age 76)
- Origin: Stanmore, Middlesex, England
- Genres: Rock; TV score
- Occupations: Musician; composer; producer; TV producer
- Instrument: Drums
- Years active: 1975–present
- Formerly of: Mike and the Mechanics

Peter Van Hooke (born 6 April 1950) is an English drummer, television and music producer, entrepreneur, and manager with over 350 credits to his name. He created and co-produced the internationally syndicated music series Live from Abbey Road, which was broadcast in 27 countries and licensed in 112 territories worldwide. Van Hooke currently manages acclaimed singer and musician Paul Carrack, who is often described as "the man with the golden voice".

Peter Van Hooke was the drummer for the English band Mike and the Mechanics (from 1985 to 1995) and also drummed for Van Morrison's band (from 1978 to 1984). During the 1980s, he co-produced (along with Rod Argent) many of Tanita Tikaram's hits.

== Education and early life ==
Van Hooke grew up in Stanmore, Middlesex, England and attended Mill Hill School. His schoolmate Chaz Jankel (later of the Blockheads) lived close by, and the two formed the Call of the Wild. This band became the Ric Parnell Independence, featuring the son of bandleader Jack Parnell as vocalist.

== Recording career ==
Van Hooke played drums on Van Morrison's albums from 1978's Wavelength, Into the Music (1979), Common One (1980), Beautiful Vision (1982), Inarticulate Speech of the Heart (1983), the live album, Live at the Grand Opera House Belfast recorded in 1983 and released in 1984, and The Philosopher's Stone (1998). For some years, he also was the drummer in Morrison's touring band which sometimes included two simultaneous drummers. He can also be heard on Louis Clark's album (per-spek-tiv) n. (1979) and Chris de Burgh's albums Into the Light (1986) and Flying Colours (1988).

He was one-half of the duo Silsoe, with Rod Argent, and they enjoyed a minor chart hit with the ITV 1986 FIFA World Cup theme "Aztec Gold".

He was also in demand as a session drummer in the '70s and '80s, and was one of the first UK drummers to own a set of Pollard Syndrums, initially coming to prominence on the Marshall Hain hit "Dancing in the City". He joined Stackridge in time to play on their 1976 album Mr. Mick, though the band broke up not long after.

== Live from Abbey Road ==
Van Hooke created and co-produced Live from Abbey Road, which was aired on Channel 4 between 2006 and 2009 in the United Kingdom. Starting with season 2, the series was licensed for broadcast in 27 countries and ultimately in 112 territories worldwide. Van Hooke's idea was to capture the sound created during the production of a record and to film the process without an audience, typical of the atmosphere in a recording studio.

== Music productions ==
He co-produced his former Mike + the Mechanics bandmate Paul Carrack's album A Different Hat (2010), on which Carrack performed with the Royal Philharmonic Orchestra.

He also co-produced with Rod Argent Soraya's debut album On Nights Like This (Spanish title: "En Esta Noche") in 1995 and her second album Wall of Smiles (Spanish title: "Torre de Marfil") in 1997.

== Personal life ==
Van Hooke is married and has three sons.

== Collaborations ==
With Joshua Kadison

- Painted Desert Serenade (Capitol Records, 1993)

With Sally Oldfield

- Strange Day in Berlin (Bronze, 1983)

With Jennifer Rush

- Wings of Desire (Columbia Records, 1989)

With The Walker Brothers

- Nite Flights (GTO, 1978)
