= Sport in Question (TV series) =

- Presented by: Ian St John; Jimmy Greaves
- Country of origin: United Kingdom
- Original language: English

Production
- Production company: Carlton Television

Original release
- Network: ITV
- Release: 16 June 1993 – 22 July 1996

Sport in Question is a British television show in which former footballers Ian St John and Jimmy Greaves discussed current sport issues in a manner similar to Question Time. It ran on ITV from 16 June 1993 to 22 July 1996.
