= Silsoe (band) =

British synth duo

- Genres: Synthpop
- Years active: 1986
- Labels: CBS, Sierra
- Past members: Rod Argent; Peter van Hooke

Silsoe was the recording name for the songwriting duo Rod Argent and Peter van Hooke.

== History ==
The name came from the village in which Argent had his studio.

There were only two singles released under the Silsoe name, both television themes for ITV. The first, "Aztec Gold", was the theme of the 1986 FIFA World Cup, on CBS Records, and it reached number 48 in the UK Singles Chart in June 1986; it was Argent's second charting hit with a World Cup television theme, as he had performed on "Argentine Melody (Cancion de Argentina)", a hit in 1978. The other single, the theme to the series The Two Of Us, released on the British label Sierra on 8 December 1986, did not chart.

"Aztec Gold" was later used as the theme for Saint and Greavsie, and the duo teamed up again for ITV's 1990 FIFA World Cup offering "Tutti Al Mondo", although they did not adopt a group name for the single.

In 2009, "Aztec Gold" was additionally adopted into the theme for a portion of the television show We Need Answers, with the phrase "let's meet the contestants" repeated to the tune throughout.
