= Jack Wagner (screenwriter) =

American screenwriter

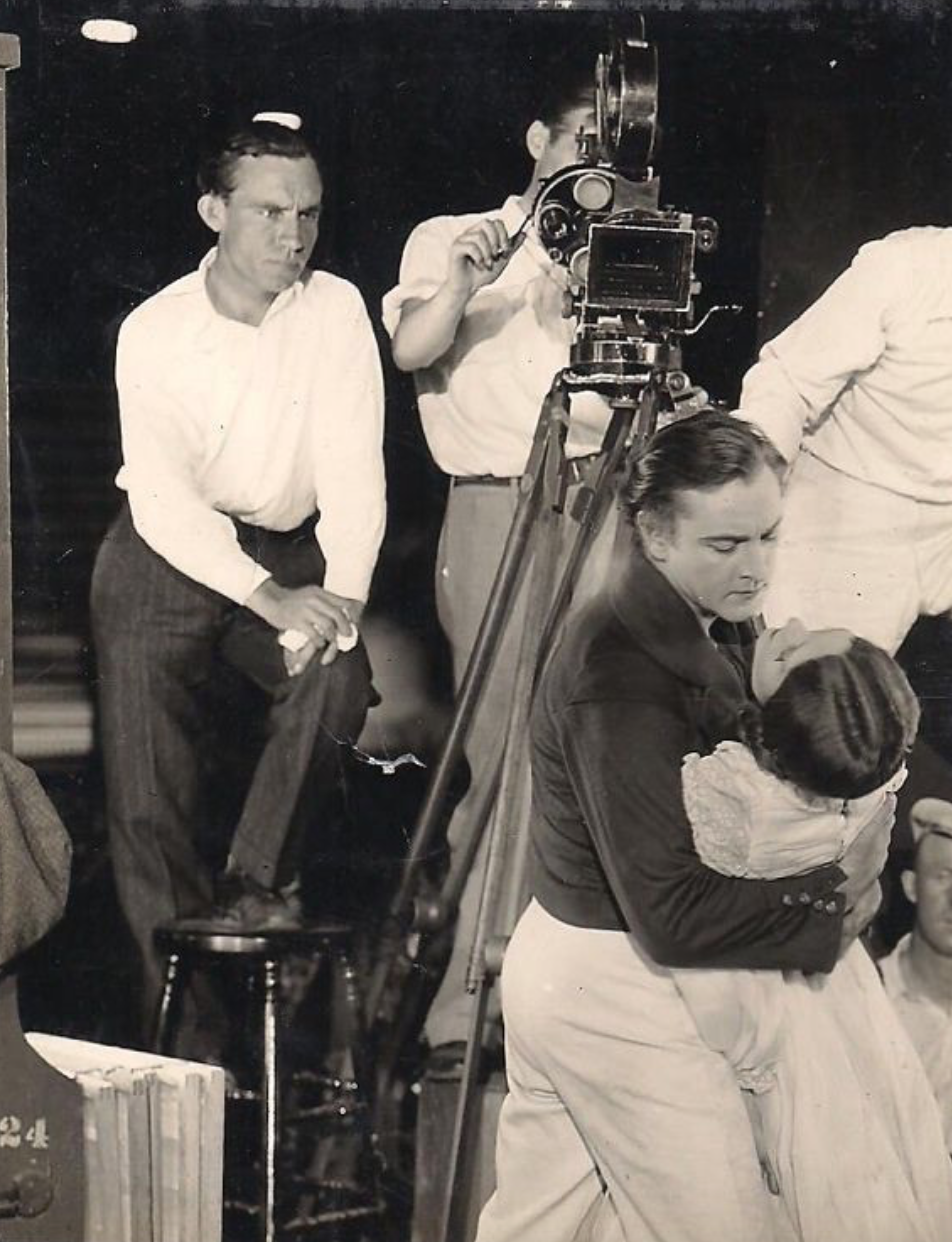
- Jack Wagner, left, on the set of The Sea Beast (1926) starring John Barrymore, foreground
- Born: May 20, 1891; Monterey, California
- Died: July 13, 1963 (aged 72)
- Occupation(s): Screenwriter and cinematographer

Jack Wagner (May 20, 1891 – July 13, 1963) was an American Academy Award nominee screenwriter and cinematographer mostly during the silent era of motion pictures.

== Biography ==
Born in Monterey, California, United States, Wagner was one of five children, all boys, of William Wallace Wagner, a railroad conductor, and Edith Wagner, a writer who provided dispatches for the Christian Science Monitor during the Mexican Revolution. He lived in Mexico from about 1895 to 1909 before moving to Los Angeles to work for D. W. Griffith on his early films. Between the years 1909 and 1912, Wagner worked mostly as a furniture painter, set designer and second unit cameraman. He then turned his attention to gag writing and found a job with Mack Sennett writing gags for Keystone Cops shorts. His specialty was comedy construction, especially the famed car chase scenes. He often alternated between writing comedy and working behind the camera as a principal photographer or assistant cameraman.

When the United States entered World War I, he joined the Army's first motion picture unit with the Signal Corps. He was assigned to filming Air Corps footage. He also filmed battles involving American forces at the Marne, St. Mihiel and Meuse-Argonne. He was discharged in 1919. He continued working through the teens and 1920s as a gag writer and cameraman for Fox Films and the Hall Room Boys Photoplays. He also worked as an assistant director and second unit man for such directors as Allan Dwan and Lewis Milestone. He also was on Corrine Griffith and Constance Talmadge's writing production staffs. One of his last cinematography assignments before turning to screenwriting full-time was as a second unit cameraman for Rex Ingram's The Four Horsemen of the Apocalypse.

In the mid-1920s he wrote gags for Harry Langdon and Will Rogers on the Mack Sennett and Hal Roach comedy lots. When talkies arrived, Wagner found himself making the difficult transition from silent films to sound. He never achieved the success he found in silents. Yet he found steady work as a gag man, adding bits of dialogue to comedy and dramatic films. He also worked as a director for the Spanish-language division of Fox Films, which included films Cupido Chauffeur and Entre Platos y Notas. In 1934, he helped script The Little Minister with Katharine Hepburn. He also co-wrote the short film La Cucaracha (1934), which garnered RKO Radio Pictures an Academy Award.

Even after this success, he struggled with writer's block. When he came up with the story idea for A Medal for Benny (1945), he again was troubled with putting the story to paper. He had known John Steinbeck for many years. Steinbeck had considered Jack's mother, Edith Wagner, as his first writing coach while growing up in Salinas, California. Jack and his brothers – Max, Blake and Bob – had been steady friends and drinking buddies with Steinbeck since the 1920s. After much work Steinbeck and Jack wrote the script for Benny and it earned an Academy Award nomination for Best Original Screenplay. He went on to help Steinbeck with another script on The Pearl. He closed out his career as a producer of Mexican films featuring such actresses as Dolores del Río, among others. He died in Los Angeles.

== Partial filmography ==
- Intolerance: Love's Struggle Throughout the Ages (assistant cameraman) (1916)
- Pathways of Life (assistant cameraman) (1916)
- The Four Horsemen of the Apocalypse (assistant cameraman) (1921)
- The Teaser (1925)
- Bobbed Hair (1925)
- The Sea Beast (1926)
- Syncopating Sue (1926)
- Lady Be Good (1928)
- La Cucaracha (1934)
- The Little Minister (1934)
- Annapolis Farewell (1935)
- Dancing Pirate (1936)
- Little Men (1940)
- A Medal for Benny (1945)
- La Otra (1946)
- The Pearl (1947)
- La Diosa Arrodillada (1947)
