= Delilah Blue =

Studio album by Joshua Kadison
- Released: October 10, 1995
- Studio: O'Henry (Burbank, California); Capitol (Hollywood, California)
- Length: 54:45
- Label: EMI
- Producer: Joshua Kadison

Joshua Kadison chronology
| Painted Desert Serenade (1993) | Delilah Blue (1995) | Saturday Night In Storyville (1998) |

Singles from Delilah Blue
- 1. "Take It on Faith" Released: October 17, 1995; 2. "Delilah Blue" Released: 1996

Delilah Blue is the second full-length studio album from pianist/singer-songwriter Joshua Kadison. Released on October 10, 1995, it featured a change of tack. Whereas the previous album had featured shorter songs, this disc presents a jazzier version of Kadison's music, with much longer tracks (with the title track clocking in at almost ten minutes). He again wrote all the songs himself (with the exception of the first track, which is public domain), but this time featured in the production credits as well.

== Track listing ==
All songs written by Joshua Kadison, except where noted.

1. "Listen to the Lambs" (traditional, arr. Joshua Kadison) - 1:40
2. "The Gospel According to My Ol' Man" - 5:30
3. "Delilah Blue" - 9:45
4. "Waiting in Green Velvet" - 4:55
5. "Jus' Like Brigitte Bardot" - 7:53
6. "Song on Neffertiti's Radio (My Love)" - 4:05
7. "Amsterdam" - 4:56
8. "Rosie and Pauly" - 4:36
9. "Take It on Faith" - 4:07
10. "The Pearl" - 7:00

== Personnel ==
- Joshua Kadison – vocals, acoustic piano, vocal arrangements
- Mike Finnigan – Hammond B3 organ
- Joe Hardy – acoustic guitar
- Jack Holder – electric guitar
- Dean Parks – acoustic guitar, electric guitar
- Leland Sklar – bass
- Michael Baird – drums
- Lenny Castro – percussion
- Luis Conte – percussion
- David Boruff – saxophone (6)
- David Campbell – string arrangements and conductor (2, 7)
- Paul Buckmaster – string arrangements and conductor (3)
- Suzie Katayama – string contractor (2, 3, 7)
- Alexandra Brown – backing vocals (1, 2, 4, 8)
- Jacquelyn Gouche-Farris – backing vocals (1, 2, 4, 8)
- Alfie Silas – backing vocals (1, 2, 4, 8)
- Myrna Smith – backing vocals (1, 2, 4, 8)
- Carmen Twillie – backing vocals (1, 2, 4, 8)
- Edna Wright – backing vocals (1, 2, 4, 8)
- Bridgette Bryant – vocal arrangements (1, 2, 4, 5, 8), backing vocals (5),
- Lynn Fiddmont – vocal arrangements (1, 2, 4, 5, 8), backing vocals (5)
- Marva Hicks – vocal arrangements (1, 2, 4, 5, 8), backing vocals (5)
- Christine McEvilly – backing vocals (2, 4)
- A.S.K. M.E. [April Allen, Sheree Hicks and Kera Trotter] – backing vocals (6), vocal arrangements (6)

== Production ==
- Nick Bode – executive producer, art direction, design, management
- Brian Koppelman – A&R
- Joshua Kadison – producer
- Kevin Smith – recording
- Jeff Shannon – recording assistant
- Brett Swain – recording assistant
- Al Schmitt – string recording (2, 3, 7)
- Charlie Paakkari – string recording assistant (2, 3, 7)
- Joe Hardy – mixing, additional overdubs
- James Senter – mix assistant
- Malcolm Springer – mix assistant
- Brian Lee – mastering
- Bob Ludwig – mastering
- Tom Nelson – photography

Studios

- Recorded at O'Henry Sound Studios (Burbank, California) and Capitol Studios (Hollywood, California).
- Overdubbed at Red Zone Studios (Burbank, California) and House of Blues (Memphis, Tennessee).
- Mixed at House of Blues
- Mastered at Gateway Mastering (Portland, Maine).

== Charts ==
Weekly chart performance for Delilah Blue
| Chart (1995) | Peak position |
|---|---|
| Australian Albums (ARIA) | 30 |
| Austrian Albums (Ö3 Austria) | 32 |
| Dutch Albums (Album Top 100) | 57 |
| German Albums (Offizielle Top 100) | 35 |
| New Zealand Albums (RMNZ) | 13 |
| Swiss Albums (Schweizer Hitparade) | 28 |
