= Joshua Kadison =

American singer-songwriter

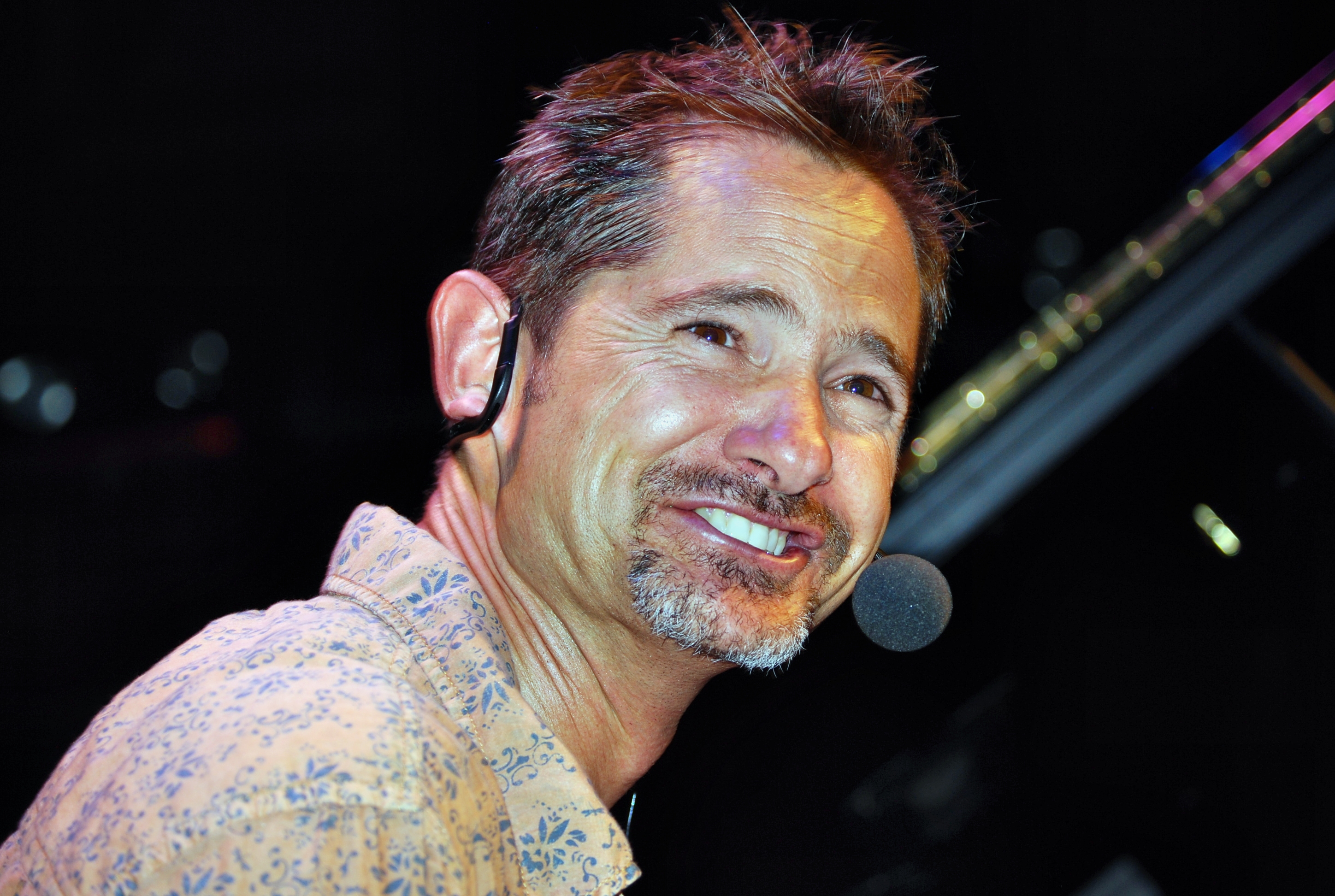
- Joshua Kadison performing in Stuttgart in 2008

Background information
- Born: February 8, 1963 (age 63); Los Angeles, California
- Genres: Pop, soft rock, pop rock, adult contemporary
- Occupation: Singer-songwriter
- Instruments: Vocals, piano
- Years active: 1992–present (sporadically since 2012)

Joshua Kadison (born February 8, 1963) is an American singer-songwriter, pianist, and writer, who was born in Los Angeles, California. He is perhaps best known for the top 40 hits "Jessie" and "Beautiful in My Eyes" from his debut album, Painted Desert Serenade. He is the son of actress Gloria Castillo, who was the inspiration behind his song "Mama's Arms".

== Career ==
According to an early press release by EMI, "His maverick ways paid off in 1993 when EMI released his self-penned debut Painted Desert Serenade, a collection of introspective story songs including the break-through single 'Jessie' and 'When a Woman Cries', already covered by legends Joe Cocker and Smokey Robinson." Kadison said, "I was so used to being outside of whatever was going on that I didn't even think I'd get a record deal, much less have my songs played on the radio." He would later receive the BMI Award for one of the most played songs of 1994. His international hit "Beautiful in My Eyes" is often played at weddings and peaked at No. 19 on the U.S. Billboard charts. Painted Desert Serenade went platinum in the US and Germany, and went multi-platinum in Australia and New Zealand. According to The Guinness book of British Hit Singles, both "Jessie" and "Beautiful in My Eyes" reached the UK top 40, with "Jessie" spending 15 weeks in the UK top 75 with the two releases of the song combined, and the album reached number 45. "Jessie" is still often heard on UK radio.

His second album, Delilah Blue, was less commercially successful. His collection of songs were closer to sonic novels than the ballads featured in his first album; he used John Steinbeck's book The Pearl as inspiration for a song of the same name. The single "Take It on Faith" failed to reach the Billboard top 10, and shortly after, EMI voided its contract with Kadison. The title track was released as a single in Australia.

In 1998, he published his book 17 Ways to Eat a Mango: A Discovered Journal of Life on an Island of Miracles and the 5-track album Saturday Night in Storyville on his own label Storyville Records, selling it predominantly from his website. It was well received in Germany, where he continues to have a huge following. In 1999, he released another album via his website, called Troubador in a Timequake, which was the first CD to include "My Father's Son". He has said this song was written about his father, Ellis Kadison, who had recently died.

Shortly after, he signed a new deal with EMI Germany, and his album Vanishing America was released in May 2001. The album deals with his disillusionment with the lost values of America. The album is a collection of songs that told stories about people not realizing their own beauty and full potential. Ironically, the album was never distributed in the United States. The album also includes two selections previously used on his late-1990s albums, "My Father's Son" and "Cherry Bowl Drive-In" and a solo version of "Dragonfly Queen", re-titled "Begging for Grace".

In 2005, Kadison relaunched his career on his self-run website "Radio Humanity". He later bought back his previous website address and re-launched it. The Venice Beach Sessions was released as a download-only album in two parts, including a selection titled "Over the Sad Songs"; this was thought to be inspired by his recently dissolved relationship. Kadison has long been openly bisexual, which he once mentioned on his website's forum. The discussion which ensued caused him to shut down the site for some time before it was eventually relaunched.

In 2006, EMI released Essential, a collection which included tracks from all three full-length studio albums and three additional selections that had formerly been B-sides.

In 2007, Kadison continued to update his website with regular letters and toured Germany in the spring. In 2008, he released the download-only album Return of the Dragonfly and toured Germany again. During the tour, he announced that he would no longer be performing his older songs and would dedicate his time to studying the bansuri, a simple seven-hole bamboo flute.

Wherever possible at his concerts, he allows audience members to sit on the stage; this is evidenced by various videos on YouTube. He also has "requests" and "Q & A" sessions at the end.

Kadison's career has been quiet since 2012, with him performing occasionally and following other interests and pursuits. His first official appearance in many years was on June 7, 2020, in a YouTube video he posted as a tribute to Black Lives Matter.

== Discography ==
=== Studio albums ===
- 1993: Painted Desert Serenade
- 1995: Delilah Blue
- 1998: Saturday Night in Storyville
- 1999: Troubadour in a Timequake
- 2001: Vanishing America
- 2005: The Venice Beach Sessions - Part 1
- 2006: The Venice Beach Sessions - Part 2

=== Compilation albums ===
- 1999: Premium Gold Collection
- 2006: The Essential Joshua Kadison
- 2008: The Complete Venice Beach Sessions
- 2010: The Complete Storyville Sessions

=== EPs ===
- 2008: Return of the Dragonfly

=== Singles ===
Year	Single	Peak chart positions											Album
Year	Single	US	AUS	NZ	GER	AUT	SWI	NED	BEL (FL)	SWE	IRE	UK	Album
1993	"Jessie"	26	15	15	12	6	11	10	29	29	16	15	Painted Desert Serenade
1994	"Beautiful in My Eyes"	19	5	23	55	—	—	—	—	—	—	37	Painted Desert Serenade
1994	"Picture Postcards from L.A."	84	46	—	55	—	—	36	36	—	—	—	Painted Desert Serenade
1995	"Take It on Faith"	—	—	—	76	—	—	—	—	—	—	—	Delilah Blue
1996	"Delilah Blue"	—	—	—	—	—	—	—	—	—	—	—	Delilah Blue
2001	"Carolina's Eyes"	—	—	—	—	—	42	—	—	—	—	—	Vanishing America
2001	"El Diablo Amor"	—	—	—	—	—	—	—	—	—	—	—	Vanishing America
"—" denotes releases that did not chart or were not released.

== Book ==
- 17 Ways To Eat A Mango: A Discovered Journal of Life on an Island of Miracles, Hyperion, New York 1999. ISBN 0-7868-6457-5
