= Timeline of football on UK television =

This is a timeline of the history of football on television in the United Kingdom.

== 1930s ==
- 1937
  - 16 September – The BBC makes the world's first television broadcast of a football match, a specially arranged local mirror match derby fixture between Arsenal and Arsenal reserves.
- 1938
  - 9 April – The BBC broadcasts live television coverage of the England v Scotland international from Wembley. This is the first senior match to be shown on television as it happened. The BBC Radio commentary by George Allison and Thomas Woodrooffe is broadcast with the pictures.
  - 30 April – The BBC broadcasts live television coverage of the FA Cup Final for the first time.
  - 26 September – The first half of the FA Charity Shield is broadcast live from Highbury.
- 1939
  - 29 April – The FA Cup Final is again shown live accompanied, for the first time, by a commentator working solely for television. George Allison provided the commentary.
  - 1 September – The BBC Television Service is suspended, owing to the imminent outbreak of the Second World War.

== 1940s ==
- 1940 to 1945
  - Television was closed for the duration of the Second World War.
- 1946
  - 7 June – BBC Television broadcasts resume.
  - 19 October – The first live televised post-war football match is broadcast by the BBC, the Athenian League match between Barnet and Wealdstone. Twenty minutes of the first half and thirty five minutes of the second half were shown before it became too dark. The broadcast only went ahead after a nearby resident allowed engineers to use their telephone line and the owner of a local allotment, Mr Overall, gave permission to erect scaffolding on his land with compensation promised for any crop damage.
- 1947
  - 8 February – A non-final match of the FA Cup is broadcast live for the first time when the BBC shows the fifth round match between Charlton Athletic and Blackburn Rovers.
  - 25 October – Scheduled live coverage of a First Division match between Charlton Athletic and Chelsea is pulled after objections from the Football League.
- 1948
  - 10 August – An evening kick-off and a match between two foreign teams is broadcast for the first time, as Sweden v Denmark in the semi-finals of the Olympic football tournament is shown live from Wembley. This is also the first time an international football tournament has been shown on television.
  - 13 August – Two full matches are shown live on the same day for the first time; the bronze medal play-off and then the final of the Olympic tournament, both at Wembley.
  - 13 November – An FA Cup Fourth Qualifying Round tie between Romford and Gillingham is televised live on the BBC.
- 1949
  - 9 April – The British Championship serves as a qualifying group for the 1950 World Cup. As a result, the BBC live broadcast of Scotland's 3–1 win against England at Wembley is the first World Cup match to be shown on British television.
  - 23 April – The first FA Amateur Cup Final staged at Wembley is also the first to be televised. The whole match is shown on the BBC, Bromley beating Romford 1–0.
  - 10 September – An African national team appears on British television for the first time. Nigeria lose 5–1 to an Isthmian League XI at Lynn Road, Ilford.
  - 30 November – The earliest live match from which some footage of the television coverage still exists, England v Italy at White Hart Lane.

== 1950s ==
- 1950
  - Very brief filmed excerpts of matches from the 1950 FIFA World Cup were shown on BBC Television.
  - 14 October - Kenneth Wolstenholme commentates on BBC Television for the first time.
- 1951
  - 28 April – The FA restricts the BBC to second half only coverage of the FA Cup Final. Kenneth Wolstenholme commentates on the final for the first time.
  - 9 May – A South American national team is shown on British television for the first time. Live second half coverage of England's 2–1 win over Argentina is broadcast on BBC Television.
  - 20 October – A Wales international, a 1–1 draw with England, is televised live for the first time. It is the first live football broadcast from outside England.
- 1952
  - The FA blocks live television coverage of the FA Cup Final. Coverage was restricted to filmed excerpts, and could only be shown from the following Monday. Every final since has been televised in full.
  - 22 November – For the first time, a live game from the first two rounds of the FA Cup is shown as the BBC televise the match between Leyton and Hereford United.
  - 20 December – The first live football broadcast from Scotland features a match between the University Select teams from England and Scotland at Westerlands, Glasgow.
- 1953
  - 2 May – The FA Cup Final between Blackpool and Bolton Wanderers is the earliest surviving full match recording in the BBC archive.
  - 20 October – Falkirk’s Brockville is the first Scottish club ground to stage a live televised match. Their floodlit friendly with Newcastle United is shown on BBC TV.
  - 21 October – England's match with a FIFA XI is the first to be recorded for a repeat broadcast. The second half was shown live and then again that evening. The whole match was shown for the first time in January 1954.
  - 25 November – England's 6–3 defeat to Hungary at Wembley is the first match recorded primarily for delayed broadcast. While the second half was shown live, the whole match was shown as scheduled on BBC TV that evening.
- 1954
  - 16 June – 4 July – The FIFA World Cup is broadcast as it happened by the BBC for the first time with eight matches shown live via the Eurovision link.
  - 3 November – A Northern Ireland international, a 2–2 draw in Scotland, is televised live for the first time. This is also the first such broadcast of a Scotland home match.
  - 11 November – A friendly international between France and Belgium is televised live on BBC TV. Outside of a tournament this was the first time a match between two overseas teams had been shown.
- 1955
  - 23 April – The 1955 Scottish Cup Final between Celtic and Clyde is the first final in Scotland to be televised live
  - 10 September – After two pilot programmes, BBC TV launches Sports Special on Saturday nights. This is the first weekly programme to show highlights of Football League and FA Cup matches. The first edition includes a Scottish League match between Rangers and Stirling Albion.
  - 22 September – Independent Television (ITV) launches in the London area.
  - 12 October – ITV shows live football for the first time. They cover the second half of a floodlit friendly between Tottenham Hotspur and Vasas Budapest from White Hart Lane, although the foggy weather may have affected the broadcast.
  - 26 October – For the first time, a match in European competition is televised. ITV shows the second half of the Inter-Cities’ Fairs Cup tie between London and Frankfurt. This is also the first floodlit match at Wembley Stadium. The European Cup begins this season, though there is no television coverage of Scotland's entrant Hibernian. England is not represented in the inaugural competition.
  - 30 November – ITV shows a home England international live from Wembley for the first time when Associated Rediffusion broadcasts their 4–1 victory over Spain, with Kent Walton commentating.
- 1956
  - 12 January – ITV broadcasts its first coverage of the FA Cup when it shows live second half coverage of the Third Round replay between non-league Bedford Town and Arsenal. The network covers two further replays that season.
  - 17 March – ITV company ABC televises recorded highlights (on film) of the FA Cup Semi-final between Birmingham City and Sunderland, the network's first ever highlights programme.
  - 5 May – The FA Cup Final is broadcast live simultaneously on BBC TV and ITV for the first time. ITV's main commentator Peter Lloyd becomes the only broadcaster to commentate on the final for both BBC and ITV, having covered the 1949 and 1950 finals for BBC TV. England captain Billy Wright and former Manchester City and England goalkeeper Frank Swift join him in the commentary box for ITV's first Cup Final broadcast.
  - 13 June – BBC TV relays live second half coverage of the inaugural European Cup Final from Paris.
  - 6 July – The Football League management committee recommends that the clubs accept a £50,000 proposal from ITV company ATV to televise 35 live Saturday night matches a season starting from 1956 to 1957.
  - 16 July – The BBC counters with a £60,000 bid to show a mixture of live FA Cup ties and League matches, both on Saturdays and on midweek evenings.
  - 20 July – The Football League clubs reject the proposals from BBC and ITV to show regular live matches from the 1956–57 season. Representations from the theatre and cinema industries were influential in the decision. ITV were prepared to double their bid to £100,000 but were still rebuffed.
- 1957
  - 12 April – A European Cup tie featuring a British side is televised for the first time. A BBC film crew travels to Spain to cover . Manchester United’s 3–1 defeat to Real Madrid in the first leg of the semi-final. Edited highlights are shown the day after the game was played.
  - 25 April – The second leg of the Manchester United v Real Madrid semi-final is shown live on ITV. The network takes coverage of the second half, but in the Granada region (covering the north of England) the whole match was shown with Gerry Loftus and Frank Swift commentating.
  - 4 May – ITV declines the opportunity to cover the FA Cup Final.
  - 30 May – The European Cup Final is not televised due to a lack of coverage in Spain, whose first football outside broadcast did not come until the following year. Film footage of the match exists.
  - 18 September – Scotsport launches on Scottish Television as a midweek only programme, its sister show Sports Desk begins the following Saturday.
  - 27 November – BBC TV shows a European Cup match involving a Scottish team for the first time. Rangers’ 4–1 defeat to AC Milan is shown live north of the border. However, only the first half and last fifteen minutes were shown with the networked drama A Time of Day given precedence at 8:30 pm.
  - 14 December – Scottish Television shows a club football match for the first time. Three days after the game was played, a ten-minute film of Rangers’ European Cup tie away to AC Milan is broadcast on the Sports Desk programme.
- 1958
  - 18 January – The first live football broadcast from the island of Ireland features Northern Ireland’s World Cup qualifier with Italy.
  - 26 March – A semi-final match in the FA Cup is shown live for the first time. BBC TV covers, in full, the replay at Highbury between Fulham and Manchester United.
  - 8 May – BBC TV shows a European Cup semi-final live for the first time, as Manchester United faced AC Milan at Old Trafford.
  - 28 May – Full live coverage of the European Cup Final is seen on British screens for the first time.
  - 8–29 June – The 1958 FIFA World Cup is covered live by BBC Television and, for the first time, by ITV. Ten live matches are made available via Eurovision. All were shown by the BBC, while seven were taken by the commercial network.
  - August – Scottish Television gains rights to televise filmed highlights of Scottish League matches. Scotsport, which was previously shown mainly on Wednesdays, becomes part of the Saturday night schedule.
  - 9 September – Scottish Television broadcasts live football for the first time. The European Cup Preliminary Round tie between Hearts and Standard Liège is also ITV’s first contribution to the Eurovision network.
- 1959
  - 13–24 May – A BBC film crew is dispatched to the Americas to cover England’s summer tour. Highlights of the matches with Brazil, Peru and Mexico are shown.

== 1960s ==
- 1960
  - 29 March – The final of the Inter-Cities Fairs Cup is televised live for the first time. BBC TV shows Birmingham City’s first leg clash with Barcelona.
  - 18 May – BBC TV are host broadcasters for the 1960 European Cup final in Glasgow. They suffer a four-minute breakdown in coverage due to a power problem. Scottish Television, broadcasting from the opposite side of Hampden Park, therefore retain the only complete recording of the classic match. They had hastily set up cameras on the north side of the stadium, after the BBC refused them access to the main gantry to the south. This was ITV's first broadcast of the final, albeit only seen in Scotland.
  - 29 May – ITV broadcasts a Scotland international live for the first time. Scottish Television shows their 4–1 defeat in Austria.
  - ITV agrees a deal worth £150,000 with the Football League to screen 26 matches; the very first live league match was on Saturday 10 September 1960 between Blackpool and Bolton Wanderers at Bloomfield Road. The match kicked off at 6:50 pm with live coverage starting at 7:30 pm under the title The Big Game. The game was played in front of a half-empty stadium. ITV withdraws from the deal after first Arsenal and then Tottenham Hotspur refused them permission to shoot at their matches against Newcastle United and Aston Villa respectively, and when the Football League demanded a dramatic increase in player appearance payments.
- 1961
  - 17 May – BBC TV are host broadcasters for the first leg of the inaugural European Cup Winners' Cup final. Rangers lose 2–0 to Fiorentina, the second half shown live in the UK.
- 1962
  - 30 May – 17 June – The 1962 World Cup in Chile is covered in delayed form by the BBC with film carried by air via the United States back to Britain. Fifteen of the thirty-two matches are shown, generally two to three days after they were played. ITV does not cover the tournament.
  - 26 August – Tyne Tees Television becomes the first ITV regional company to broadcast weekly Football League highlights. Their programme Shoot showed filmed excerpts of matches in the north-east of England
  - 30 September – ITV company Anglia Television launches Match of the Week, which shows highlights of matches from around East Anglia. It is often written that the first match shown was Ipswich Town's 3–2 defeat at the hands of Wolves at Portman Road on 22 September 1962. However, this was a pilot programme and was not transmitted. The first edition was shown a week later, featuring Norwich City’s match with Derby County. Anglia's debut programme, directed by Bob Gardam, was a pioneering one. This was the first time an edited football match, recorded on videotape, had been shown on television anywhere in the world.
- 1964
  - 15 August – Scottish Television launches Scotsport Results to provide Scottish viewers with a round-up of the day's Scottish football. It is broadcast on Saturday teatimes at around 5 pm during the football season.
  - 22 August – The first broadcast of the BBC's football television show Match of the Day. It is shown on the recently launched BBC Two.
- 1965
  - 8 September – ITV signs an exclusive contract to televise highlights of England's home matches in the build up to the 1966 World Cup.
  - 17 October – Football highlights start to be shown on ITV in the London area, ATV launches Star Soccer, with coverage of the match between West Ham United and Sheffield Wednesday.
  - 7 November – ABC begins regional coverage in the North and Midlands, with their programme World of Soccer.
- 1966
  - 2 April – Scottish Television and Grampian Television show live coverage of a Scotland home international for the first time, as England win 4–3 at Hampden.
  - 11–30 July – The BBC and ITV jointly host coverage of the 1966 World Cup, forming a consortium to provide pictures for broadcasters around the world. Slow motion replays are integrated into the BBC's coverage of the matches at Wembley.
  - 20 August – Match of the Day moves to BBC1.
  - 6 November – Southern Television becomes the latest ITV company to offer local football highlights. Southern Soccer will be a regular Sunday afternoon programme until coverage is cut back in the early 70s. The first match is the previous day's encounter between Brighton & Hove Albion and Oldham Athletic, with Maurice Edelston commentating.
  - 22 November – A friendly between Chelsea and Real Madrid at Stamford Bridge is the first pay-per-view live football match on UK television. The Pay-TV service offered its subscribers in Westminster and Sheffield coverage of the game for the price of ten shillings (50p).
  - 7 December – The fifth round tie between Sheffield United and Birmingham City is the first Football League Cup match to be shown live on television. British Relay's Pay-TV service charged ten shillings (50p) to subscribers in Sheffield and Westminster.
- 1967
  - 4 February – Pay-TV broadcasts live the First Division match between Sheffield United and Sheffield Wednesday to a potential audience of around 700 subscribers in Sheffield. This is the first Football League match to be shown in full on television.
  - 4 March – Extensive highlights of the Football League Cup Final are televised for the first time on Match of the Day.
  - 3 April – The Football League Management Committee reject a £1m offer from BBC Television to show live League football on Thursday nights.
  - 12 August – The FA Charity Shield between Manchester United and Tottenham Hotspur at Old Trafford is covered by BBC colour cameras, with plans for a special broadcast on BBC2. A press reception was organised in a suite at the Midland Hotel in Manchester. However, while colour pictures were received in London where the Match of the Day programme was to be edited, it was discovered that their videotape machines had only recorded in black and white.
- 1968
  - 18 May - The FA Cup Final is televised in colour for the first time, on BBC2.
  - 1 June - The first England international to be televised in colour is shown on BBC2. England suffer their first ever defeat to West Germany in Hanover. As well as BBC2, the match is broadcast live on BBC1 and ITV.
  - 25 August – The first edition of The Big Match is broadcast. It is produced by London Weekend Television region and tailored for a London audience but other regions would show The Big Match if they were not covering games of their own. Of the other regional companies, Ulster Television and Westward Television carried the programme most weeks. Granada Television and Yorkshire Television begin producing weekly football programmes of their own, having taken over from previous franchise holder ABC. ATV's Star Soccer now covers matches in the Midlands rather than London.
  - ITV launches On the Ball, a lunchtime preview of the day's football fixtures. It is shown as a segment within World of Sport.
  - 2 November – The first colour edition of Match of the Day is shown on BBC 2.
- 1969
  - 1 June – The first live broadcast of an England international played outside Europe is shown on ITV, a 0–0 draw in Mexico.
  - 9 August – Match of the Day switches, for one season only, to a regional format. Aside from FA Cup weekends, the programme would show one match across England, Wales and Northern Ireland and then a different second game in each region. David Coleman becomes the programme's regular host, although he misses the first League Saturday of the season having lost his voice.
  - 15–16 November – Match of the Day and London Weekend Television‘s The Big Match are now broadcast in colour.

== 1970s ==
- 1970
  - 18 April – The Home International between Northern Ireland and Scotland at Windsor Park is the first match featuring either nation to be televised in colour, covered by ITV cameras for all broadcasters. Wales also receive their first colour coverage, from BBC cameras, as they host England at Ninian Park.
  - 31 May – 21 June – The 1970 World Cup is the first televised in colour.
  - 5 August – ITV televises the first penalty shootout in English football history as Manchester United beat Hull City in the Watney Cup.
  - Match Of The Day changes format for the 1970–71 season, featuring highlights of two matches screened nationwide – with the occasional optout for viewers in Wales.
  - 31 October – ITV football broadcasts are affected by a technicians’ dispute across the network. The industrial action means programmes cannot be recorded in colour until February 1971, meaning that almost all matches in this period are in black and white.
- 1971
  - 2 June – A British audience can watch the European Cup Final in colour for the first time (colour cameras were present for the 1969 final, but the coverage was not taken by the BBC who showed the match). Ajax's victory over Panathinaikos at Wembley is covered by BBC Television, for whom Kenneth Wolstenholme gives his final commentary.
  - 7 August – ITV cameras cover the Charity Shield for the first time, with highlights shown the following day. Second Division champions Leicester City, standing in for Double winners Arsenal, beat Liverpool 1–0.
- 1972
  - 14–18 June – ITV covers the finals of the UEFA European Championship for the first time.
- 1973
  - 30 May – The European Cup Final is shown live simultaneously on BBC1 and ITV for the final time to date.
- 1974
  - 15 May – The European Cup Final is televised live in Scotland on ITV, but not the rest of the UK due to a clash with the international between England and Northern Ireland. The replay is not shown live in the UK at all.
  - August – Sam Leitch's Football Preview, the lunchtime segment within Grandstand, is renamed Football Focus with the arrival of newly retired Arsenal goalkeeper Bob Wilson as presenter.
- 1975
  - 9 August – BBC Scotland's long-running Saturday night programme Sportsreel is renamed Sportscene.
  - 16 August – The first edition of Scoreboard is shown on BBC One Scotland. It is an opt-out from Grandstand to provide fuller coverage of the day's Scottish football news.
- 1976
  - 20 June – ITV has exclusive live coverage of the UEFA European Championship final.
- 1978
  - London Weekend Television audaciously wins exclusive rights to all league football coverage for ITV in a move termed Snatch of the Day. Although the Office of Fair Trading blocked the move, the BBC is forced to allow ITV to take over the Saturday night slot in alternating seasons, beginning with the 1980–81 season.

== 1980s ==
- 1981
  - 1 April - The Football League Cup Final is shown live for the first time, as ITV broadcasts the replay between Liverpool and West Ham United at Villa Park.
- 1983
  - March – The Football League agrees in principle an exclusive £8 million deal with video company Telejector to screen highlights of matches in pubs and clubs for the 1983–84 and 1984–85 seasons. The BBC and ITV would have no rights at all, having tabled a £5.3m bid. The agreement is subject to ratification by the 92 clubs at a meeting in April.
  - 27 April – Telejector withdraws its offer. Sports Minister Neil McFarlane hinted the government may step in to block the deal.
  - 29 May – 5 June – Channel 4 shows highlights of both legs of the Brazilian Cup Final between Santos and Flamengo.
  - 15 July – The Football League agrees a deal worth £5.2 million with BBC and ITV to televise matches for the next two seasons. For the first time, shirt advertising would be accepted on television and live matches, five League games per network and the League Cup Final, were included in the agreement. Thames Television’s international arm purchases the overseas rights for £500,000.
  - 28 August – The Big Match becomes a nationally networked programme, as ITV moves away from regional highlights. However, after the second weekend of the season highlights coverage is knocked off the air until February by an industrial dispute involving videotape editors.
  - 2 October – ITV shows a live top flight football match for the first time since 1960. Tottenham win 2–1 against Nottingham Forest on a Sunday afternoon. The BBC also shows five live matches that season, on Friday evenings.
  - 16 December – BBC televises a live Football League game for the first time, as they broadcast Manchester United's 4–2 win over Tottenham Hotspur. They had originally planned to televise Watford v West Ham United on 28 October, but the broadcast was cancelled due to industrial action that took Match of the Day off the air for several weeks.
- 1984
  - 14 January – Telejector goes into liquidation.
  - 29 March – Dedicated sports channel Screen Sport begins broadcasting.
  - 4 May – A match from England's second tier is televised live for the first time as BBC's Match of the Day Live features the promotion battle between Manchester City and Chelsea.
  - 23 May – The UEFA Cup Final is televised live for the first time. ITV cover the second leg match between Tottenham Hotspur and Anderlecht.
  - 24 May – Screen Sport broadcasts football for the first time, with delayed coverage of the match between West Germany and Italy in Zürich to celebrate FIFA's eightieth anniversary.
  - 12–27 June – Live coverage of the 1984 European Championship is only shown on the BBC, with ITV coverage restricted to highlights on World Of Sport and same night highlights of a semi-final (which was scheduled as a last minute programme change). Only two matches were shown live – a group game and the final.
  - 2 October – Brazilian League football debuts on Screen Sport, soon becoming a regular part of the schedule.
- 1985
  - 17 May – Screen Sport covers the Football League Trophy Southern Area Final between Brentford and Newport County, the first time a match in an English senior competition had been broadcast exclusively on a satellite channel. The Northern equivalent and the Wembley final would also be shown.
  - Aside from the FA Charity Shield, no domestic league or cup football in England is shown on terrestrial TV for the first half of the 1985–86 season.
  - 17 September – Screen Sport covers, and sponsors, the Football League Super Cup, a competition designed to compensate clubs banned from European competition following the Heysel Stadium disaster. The satellite and cable network paid the Football League £250,000 for the rights. This was the only English club competition shown on television in the UK in the first half of the season.
  - 5 October – Following the demise of ITV's Saturday afternoon sports show World of Sport the previous week, its football preview show becomes a programme in its own right, called Saint & Greavsie, and a stand-alone results programme called Results Service is launched.
  - 27 October – After the live broadcast of the Scottish League Cup Final, domestic football disappears from Scottish screens due to a dispute between clubs over live coverage of Premier Division matches. Rangers and Celtic lead the group of six clubs who refuse to allow cameras in, despite a majority voting in favour of the deal.
- 1986
  - 4 January – Televised domestic football returns in England when ITV screen highlights from the third round of the FA Cup. The following day BBC Television shows the tie between Charlton Athletic and West Ham United live.
  - 20 January – Sky Television commences weekly coverage of Italian football. An hour-long highlights programme was available to cable viewers across the UK.
  - 18 March – A deal is agreed between Scottish clubs to allow television coverage to resume.
  - 3 April – Screen Sport shows the first coverage of Dutch league football on UK television.
  - 20 April – The game between Hearts and Aberdeen is the first league match in Scotland to be televised live, broadcast by Scottish Television.
  - 16 August – The FA Charity Shield is shown live in its entirety for the first time. ITV provide coverage of the match involving Everton and Liverpool.
  - 6 November – ITV’s plans to televise live the Serie A match between Juventus and Napoli on 9 November are blocked by the Football League, to protect attendances at Aldershot v Stockport County and Scunthorpe United v Halifax Town. Three weeks earlier ITV had been denied permission to show Real Madrid v Barcelona on Midweek Sport Special, due to a clash with matches in the Littlewoods Cup.
- 1987
  - 3 March – Sky Television begins showing weekly highlights of Dutch league football. The following day, Spanish football is shown for the first time on the same channel, with highlights running every Wednesday night for the remainder of the season.
  - 14 May – Anglia Television provides the only television coverage of the inaugural semi-finals of the Football League Play-offs, with highlights of the first leg match between Ipswich Town and Charlton Athletic. Oldham Athletic banned all television cameras, including news crews, from the second leg of their match with Leeds United, though they did record the match for a club video.
  - 22–25 May – There is no television coverage, apart from clips for local news, of any of the inaugural two-legged finals of the Football League Play-offs. Two finals go to replays, which are broadcast.
  - 27 May – For the first time since 1966, there is no live coverage of the European Cup Final on UK television. ITV shows highlights on Midweek Sport Special. There would be no live terrestrial coverage of the occasion again until 1991.
  - 29 May – Yorkshire Television covers the Second Division play-off final replay between Charlton Athletic and Leeds United at St Andrew's, Birmingham. Highlights are shown that night in Yorkshire and in the London area. A BBC camera is present at Selhurst Park to capture the Third Division play-off final replay, brief highlights are shown on Grandstand the following day.
  - July – Screensport signs a deal with Thames Television, who were the Football League's agent for international distribution, to transmit 34 recorded matches via cable and satellite. Thames produced its programme, called Big League Soccer. This was a different programme to the one by the same name that they had produced for international markets since 1979. Screensport was the only channel to show weekly extended highlights of the league during the 1987/88 season.
  - Also that month, Screensport and ITV cover the Copa América, shown on British television for the first time. Screensport has live coverage of the final.
- 1988
  - 14 May – The FA Cup Final is shown simultaneously on the BBC and ITV. This would not occur again for 34 years. ITV would not cover the competition again, in any form, until 1997.
  - 17 May – Sky Television televises a live match for the first time, with coverage of the friendly between Manchester United and AC Milan at Old Trafford. Martin Tyler commentates.
  - 27 June – Chrysalis Television is awarded the contract to produce a weekly Football League highlights programme for overseas markets. This contract obliges them to provide single camera coverage of every top division match, a new innovation. The resulting pictures would also be made available to domestic rights holders.
  - 2 August – BSB and BBC Television withdraw from the auction for the rights to show the Football League over the next four years, having made a combined bid worth £44m. As a result, ITV’s proposal, also a £44m offer, is accepted by the 92 clubs at an extraordinary general meeting. The intervention of the satellite company drove up the price for the rights significantly.
  - 3 August – Having withdrawn their bid for League football, BSB and BBC join forces to secure a five-year deal worth £30m to televise FA Cup and England matches. Match of the Day, would now only broadcast on Cup and Charity Shield weekends, and be renamed Match of the Day: The Road to Wembley. BSB, after suffering several delays to its launch, does not begin broadcasting until March 1990.
  - August – Weekly highlights of First Division matches in the 1988–89 season are shown on satellite and cable via Super Channel. The channel relayed the Chrysalis Television produced English Soccer programme, whilst also becoming the home of Dutch football during the campaign.
  - 5 September – S4C launches a sports programme called Sgorio. The programme is set up to provide highlights of European football, including highlights of games from La Liga and Serie A, although other sports are also included within the programme.
  - 3 October – Screensport gains the rights to the Spanish League, and begins weekly full match coverage.
  - 30 October – Following the signing of a new four-year deal to show exclusive live coverage of top flight English football, ITV shows the first of its allotted 18 live League games per season. In addition, the contract included the rights to live coverage of a semi-final and the final of the Football League Cup.
- 1989
  - 7 January – BBC Scotland launches an extended Saturday teatime results programme. Rather than opting out of the last few minutes of Grandstand, the programme, called Afternoon Sportscene, runs for the entire duration of the time allocated for the day's results, starting at some point between 1 and 5 minutes before the network aired English counterpart Final Score.
  - 5 February – Eurosport begins broadcasting.
  - 1 April – Screensport broadcasts live El Clásico to a UK audience for the first time.
  - 24 May – Eurosport offers the first UK satellite broadcast of the European Cup final, showing delayed coverage at 10 pm. ITV shows highlights on Midweek Sports Special.
  - 11 August – Friday Sportscene launches as a Friday night preview of the weekend's Scottish football.
  - 26 August – Newly promoted Chelsea refuse to allow ITV to show footage of their home matches. Unlike the majority of First Division clubs, Chelsea use their own cameras to record the games. Chairman Ken Bates allows pictures to be used by international distributors World Wide Soccer, but no League action from Stamford Bridge is seen domestically until December.
  - 13 December – The 2–1 friendly win over Yugoslavia is the last home England international not to be covered live by a UK broadcaster.
  - 18 December – The Football League ratifies a £4.5m deal with Sky Television to televise matches from the Zenith Data Systems Cup and Leyland DAF Cup. This is Sky's first coverage of English domestic football.

== 1990s ==
- 1990
  - 1 January – Sheffield Wednesday’s New Year's Day clash with Manchester City is the last English top division match to be played without any form of television coverage. The early kick-off, 12 noon, caught out the camera operator, who did not arrive in time.
  - 16 March – Eurosport televises the final of the 1990 African Cup of Nations, the first coverage of the tournament in the UK.
  - 28 March – An England international is shown live on BSB for the first time. England beat Brazil 1–0. Delayed full match coverage of Scotland's 1–0 win over Argentina is shown immediately afterwards. Earlier that day, Italian league highlights comprised The Sports Channel's first football broadcast.
  - 1 April – BSB's Sports Channel provides the first UK-wide live broadcast of a Scottish League match, the Old Firm game at Ibrox Park.
  - 14 April – A Scottish Cup semi-final across the UK for the first time when BSB broadcasts the match between Aberdeen and Dundee United.
  - 16 May – A Scotland international is broadcast live on satellite television for the first time. BSB screens the 3–1 defeat to Egypt at Pittodrie.
  - 8 June – 8 July – Eurosport televises all 52 matches from the 1990 FIFA World Cup in full.
  - 16 August – With English clubs due to return to UEFA competition after the Heysel ban, the Football League approves a deal for ITV to show exclusive coverage of Manchester United and Aston Villa's European matches in the 1990–91 season.
  - 18 August – The Charity Shield is shown live on satellite television for the first time. BSB's Sports Channel provides the coverage.
  - 17 November – BSB's Sports Channel shows the FA Cup First Round tie between Aylesbury United and Walsall, the first live tie on satellite television and the first live match at this stage of the competition since 1952.
- 1991
  - 7 January – BSB begins broadcasting live FA Cup matches on Monday nights, starting with Manchester United v Queen's Park Rangers in the Third Round.
  - 18 May – Sky Sports televises the Scottish Cup Final, the first live broadcast of the occasion on satellite television.
  - 29 May – Live coverage of the European Cup final returns to British television for the first time in five years. BBC1 screens the match featuring Chris Waddle’s Olympique de Marseille against Red Star Belgrade. Satellite and cable viewers also had the choice of watching the match live on Eurosport for the first time.
  - July – Having shown live coverage of the closing stages in 1987 and 1989, Screensport offers complete live coverage of the Copa América. This was a first on UK television.
  - 4 July – Eurosport televises the Soviet Cup Final.
- 1992
  - 26 January – Channel 4 broadcasts highlights of the African Cup of Nations final, the first terrestrial coverage of the tournament. John Salako hosted the review that included action from every match in a competition covered extensively by Screensport, Channel 4 taking their commentary for the highlights of the final.
  - 10 May – Sky Sports televises the FA Trophy Final for the first time, albeit on tape delay rather than live.
  - 18 May – Sky outbids ITV for the live rights to the newly formed football Premier League. Sky bids £304 million, as opposed to ITV's £262 million.
  - 25 May – The 1992 Football League Second Division play-off final is the first play-off match to be broadcast live, though only on Granada Television and Central Television rather than nationally networked.
  - 27 June – Due to ITV losing the rights to top flight football, Saint & Greavsie is broadcast for the final time following a decision by ITV to drop its Saturday football preview and results programmes. The final edition of Results Service had been shown a month earlier but Saint & Greavsie continued for an additional month so that the programme could cover Euro 92.
  - 15 August –
    - The BBC's regaining of rights to top flight football sees the return of Football Focus after a four-year hiatus, and Match of the Day as a weekly programme.
    - Sky Sports launches Sports Saturday. It follows the same format as the BBC's Grandstand programme featuring a mix of sporting action, concluding with the day's football results.
  - 16 August – To mark the start of Sky Sports's coverage of the Premier League, the channel launches an afternoon-long programme called Super Sunday. The programme concludes with a 90-minute football round-up called Scorelines.
  - On the same day, ITV’s longstanding relationship with the Football League moves into a new phase, with the first regional transmission of live matches from the First Division. This was now the second tier of English football.
  - 17 August – Monday Night Football makes its debut on Sky Sports as part of their deal to show Premier League matches. The company had already established the practice of scheduling major live football on Mondays as part of their ongoing FA Cup contract.
  - 2 September – UEFA announce that ITV have secured an exclusive contract to show the UEFA Champions League. The deal covers matches from the group stage onwards.
  - 6 September – The first edition of Football Italia is broadcast as part of Channel 4's deal to show Serie A. The channel continues to show Italian football for the next ten years. At its peak in the 1990s, Football Italia attracted over 3 million viewers, and remains the most watched programme in the UK about a non-British domestic football league.
  - On the same day as Football Italia launches, Yorkshire Television offers the first ever live broadcast of an English third tier match, as Bradford City win 2–1 at Huddersfield Town.
  - 25 November – The first UEFA Champions League group stage begins, with ITV holding exclusive rights. However, only seven of the regions show live coverage of Rangers’ opener against Olympique de Marseille.
- 1993
  - May – Scotsport Results is axed. It had provided Scottish Television viewers with a Saturday teatime football round-up for the past 29 seasons.
  - 30 May – The third tier Football League Play-off Final is televised live for the first time. Though the match between West Bromwich Albion and Port Vale is only shown on Central Television.
  - 31 May – The second tier Football League play-off final is screened live on the ITV network for the first time. Ian St John and Jimmy Greaves were reunited to host the coverage.
- 1994
  - 18 May – The BBC shows the 1994 European Cup Final. Despite the inception of the UEFA Champions League in 1992 and ITV's exclusive contract, the rights to the final remained available to all EBU members. This broadcast brought to an end the BBC's association with football's premier European clubs tournament which had dated back to the inaugural final in 1956.
  - 17 June – 17 July – The BBC and ITV opt only to show selected group games in full at the 1994 FIFA World Cup. This is the final time that terrestrial television does not show a match live in every slot. Eurosport shows comprehensive coverage of the tournament. The satellite network showed ten matches exclusively live in the UK.
  - July – Cable channel Wire TV agrees a deal to televise up to 40 live Conference matches, plus weekly highlights, during the 1994–95 season.
- 1995
  - The first edition of Saturday morning football-based comedy/talk show Soccer AM is broadcast on Sky Sports.
  - 28 November – Sky Sports secures a five-year deal worth £125m to televise the Football League. The deal included 48 live Division One matches per season, 12 from Divisions Two and Three, the play-offs and a match each round from the League Cup, commencing at the start of the 1996–97 season. The Football League declined an offer from The FA to bundle their broadcast and commercial rights with the FA Cup and England matches when the governing body negotiated their own deal. ITV retain the right to show ten exclusive live Division One matches on a regional basis in the 1996–97 season.
  - 30 November – It is announced that from the 1997–98 season, the FA Cup Final will be televised live on satellite television as Sky agree a new four-year deal to cover the competition and England matches. ITV are the main free-to-air partner, gaining rights to one live match per round from the third round onwards and highlights of replays and England matches. BBC retain the right to show FA Cup highlights on Saturday nights, but the deal means the corporation will not have live television coverage of the final for the first time since 1952.
- 1996
  - 16 August – Sky Sports 3 launches. The new channel becomes the showcase for Sky's coverage of the Football League. The first live match to be shown, and the first ever on satellite television, is Manchester City v Ipswich Town.
  - 30 August – Sky Sports’ transmission of Plymouth Argyle v Preston North End in Division Two is the first ever UK-wide live broadcast of a match from England's third tier.
  - 22 December – Former England goalkeeper Peter Shilton plays the 1000th League match of his career, donning the gloves for Leyton Orient against Brighton in Division Three. The landmark occasion is shown by Sky Sports, the first match from England's fourth tier to be screened live.
- 1997
  - 31 May – Even though Channel 5 had said that it hadn't been intending to show live sport at peak time, it buys the rights to one of England's qualifying matches for the 1998 World Cup – an away match against Poland.
  - ITV obtains the FA Cup and England International football highlights rights from the BBC resulting in the return of the FA Cup to ITV screens for the first time since 1988.
  - 17 September – Cable channel Carlton Select shows live coverage of the UEFA Champions League match between Kosice and Manchester United, beginning a run of showing alternative live games to ITV that would continue until the launch of ITV2 in 1998. ITV screened Newcastle United's tie with Barcelona, except in the Granada region where Manchester United were shown.
  - 1 October – Satellite channel Granada Plus shows live coverage of the UEFA Champions League match between Dynamo Kyiv and Newcastle United. Following on from Carlton Select's broadcast two weeks earlier, the channel offered an alternative live match to ITV, who showed Manchester United at home to Juventus.
  - Autumn – Football on 5, which becomes a regular fixture as the channel purchases rights to UEFA Cup games and England away qualifying matches involving the home nations, showing the former through the next decade.
- 1998
  - February – Middlesbrough Football Club launches Boro TV, and becomes the first football club in the world to launch their own dedicated TV channel.
  - 28 February – The 1998 Africa Cup of Nations Final between South Africa and Egypt is shown live on Channel 4, the first time that the tournament has been shown as it happened on UK terrestrial television.
  - 15 August – On the first day of the 1998–99 football season, the first edition of Soccer Saturday is broadcast. This is the UK's first afternoon-long football scores service.
  - 5 September – ITV resurrects On the Ball, a lunchtime preview of the day's football fixtures. ITV also resurrects The Big Match as the title for its football coverage.
  - 10 September – MUTV launches.
  - 1 October – Sky Digital launches and this is marked by the launch of the UK's first rolling sports news channel Sky Sports News with football news a mainstay of the new service.
  - 7 December – ITV launches ITV2 and part of its schedule is devoted to additional football coverage. Among the output is a Saturday afternoon scores service called Football First. This is ITV's first football results programme for six years.
- 1999
  - 26 February – Oxford United v Sunderland is the first competitive pay-per-view (PPV) football match to be broadcast on Sky television.
  - September – Champions on 28 and Champions on 99 launch to provide live and recorded coverage of the UEFA Champions League. The channels are only available to ONdigital customers.

== 2000s ==
- 2000
  - 5–14 January – The BBC shows the inaugural FIFA Club World Cup. The Corporation shows live coverage of all matches on BBC Choice with Manchester United's matches and the final also being broadcast on BBC1. The third place match was broadcast on BBC2.
  - 15 June – The latest contracts for football's Premier League are announced with the big news being that ITV has won the rights to the highlights package from the BBC at a reported cost of £183 million. Sky holds onto exclusive live coverage for another three seasons.
  - September – ONsport launches. It replaces Champions on 28 and Champions on 99, which had reflected the channel numbers these were broadcast on. These channels were re-branded respectively as ONsport 1 and ONsport 2, after ONdigital had purchased rights to the ATP Masters Series tennis. Whilst ONsport 1 broadcasts 24 hours a day, ONsport 2 timeshared with Carlton Cinema and is only on air to provide coverage of an alternate Champions League match.
- 2001
  - 30 May – 10 June – Channel 5 broadcasts the FIFA Confederations Cup. Channel 5 also shows the next two tournaments.
  - 11 August – The ITV Sport Channel launches. It replaces ONsport. The new channel is mostly focussed on football and comes after ONdigital successfully outbid BSkyB for the rights to show live matches from The Football League and the League Cup, for a massive £315m over three seasons, at least five times more than any broadcaster had previously bid for it.
  - On the same day, Football Focus and Final Score become programmes in their own right. Previously both had been a segment within Grandstand.
  - 13 August – Chelsea TV launches.
  - 18 August – ITV begins its coverage of the Premier League when it launches its highlights programme The Premiership. The programme is shown in a primetime slot, airing at 7 pm as opposed to the 10.30 pm slot previously used by the BBC. ITV also relaunches its live scores service, now known as The Goal Rush.
  - 19 August – Premiership Plus launches. The channel shows pay-per-view coverage of the Premier League, bringing pay-per-view top flight football to a UK-wide audience for the first time. Cable and ITV Digital viewers received the pay-per-view matches via ITV Sport Select during the 2001–02 season.
  - September – The rights to live FA Cup matches and the England football team return to the BBC.
  - 17 November – Following disappointing viewing figures ITV ends its experiment with peak time Saturday night football and The Premiership reverts to the traditional 10.30 pm slot.
- 2002
  - Channel 4 decides to call full time on a decade of showing Serie A.
  - 27 March – ITV Digital goes into administration with the cost of the Football League deal being the burden which pushed the company over the edge.
  - 12 May – Following the collapse of ITV Digital, the ITV Sports Channel stops broadcasting.
  - August – Coverage of the Football League and the League Cup reverts to Sky Sports after a single season with ITV.
  - Channel 5 buys the rights to the Scottish League Cup and shows the tournament for the next two seasons.
- 2003
  - May – ITV decides to stop showing a football scores service resulting in the demise of The Goal Rush.
  - Sky Sports shows games from the UEFA Champions League for the first time.
- 2004
  - 15 May – Following its loss of Premier League highlights, The Premiership is shown for the final time. Also, On the Ball is discontinued for the same reason.
  - 26 July – Celtic TV and Rangers TV launch.
  - August – Football First launches on Sky Sports. The programme allows viewers to choose the game they want to watch.
  - August – ITV launches a new regional football highlights programme Soccer Night. The programme focuses on Football League clubs, was introduced for the 2004–05 season to replace the long-standing Sunday afternoon highlights programmes owing to cutbacks at ITV plc.
  - August – Irish sports broadcaster Setanta Sports takes over from the BBC as the UK rights holder of the Scottish Premier League.
  - 14 August – To coincide with the BBC regaining rights to highlights of the Premier League, BBC Sport launches an afternoon-long football scores service Score Interactive. The programme is broadcast from 14:30 until 18:00 on the BBC's interactive service, the BBC Red Button. The BBC had operated an in-vision scores service on Saturday afternoon the previous season.
  - 15 August – Match of the Day 2 launches to show highlights of Sunday Premier League matches. It is called MOTD2 due to it being shown on BBC Two.
- 2005
  - 22 May – Sky Sports shows the final of the 2004-05 FA Trophy, and goes on to show the next two finals.
- 2006
  - 22 May – Sky launches its high definition service when Sky Sports 1 HD being broadcasting.
  - August – The European Union objects to what it saw as a monopoly on television football rights and demands the 2007 contract be split into separate packages of 23 games. Consequently, Sky wins four of the six available packages, with the other two taken by Setanta Sports.
  - 25 August – Setanta Sports acquires the rights to the Football Conference. The deal also sees the Conference Cup renamed the Setanta Cup.
  - September – Bravo and Setanta Sports take over coverage of Serie A under a joint agreement from 2005 to the end of the 2006–07 season.
- 2007
  - 6 May – PremPlus closes.
  - May – After 15 seasons, Monday Night Football ends its first run due to Sky losing the rights to Monday evening Premiership matches to Setanta Sports.
  - 11 August – After the European Union objected to what it saw as a monopoly on Premier League television rights, the 2007 contract was split into separate packages of 23 games in which at least one had to be sold to another broadcaster. Consequently, live Premier League matches are shown on a non-Sky Sports channel for the first time when Setanta Sports shows the first of its 46 matches – with Sky showing the remaining 92 television fixtures.
  - September – Five gains the rights to broadcast Serie A highlights and live games in the 2007–08 season. The show thus returned to terrestrial television and live games were shown weekly at 1:30 pm UK time on Sundays, Coverage is shown under the name of Football Italiano.
  - 20 September – LFC TV, a dedicated official channel for English football club Liverpool F.C., launches.
  - 23 December – Bravo decides to drop its coverage of Serie A due to poor viewing figures. The league does continue to be shown by Setanta Sports.
- 2008
  - 14 January – Arsenal TV launches.
  - May – ITV's regional football highlights programme Soccer Night is axed as part of further cutbacks in ITV's regional output. The Welsh Soccer Sunday continued for a further six months with coverage of Cardiff City and Swansea City for the first half of the 2008/9 season but that programme was axed in December 2008. Goals from local Football League matches moved to ITV regional news programmes.
  - 17 May – Sky Sports shows FA Cup football for the final time, having covered the competition since BSB's Sports Channel launched in 1990.
  - 27 June – Five decides to end its coverage of Serie A after just a single season. The 2008/09 season is not shown in the UK, apart from a Milan derby which was shown by BBC Sport. ESPN picks up the rights beginning with the 2009/10 season.
  - September – ITV resumes showing the FA Cup and the England football team. Consequently, the BBC has no rights to any form of coverage of the FA Cup for the very first time.
- 2009
  - 22 June – It is announced that ESPN will take over the 46 games per season that were shown on Setanta Sports after Setanta failed to make a £10m payment to the rights holder which meant that the rights returned to the Premier League which allowed it to sell those rights to another broadcaster.
  - 23 June – Setanta Sports ceases broadcasting in the UK after going into administration. also stop broadcasting and from this date, football club channels Celtic TV and Rangers TV, which were sold as part of the Setanta package, close although both later return as online only channels. Arsenal TV does continue but closes just over a month later.
  - 4 August – ESPN launches in the UK, picking up many of the rights previously held by Setanta Sports. These inclu de the rights to the Premier League that Setanta had held. It later added many other football rights to its portfolio, including the Scottish Premier League, FA Cup, European club football and the Europa League
  - Live coverage of the Football League returns to British terrestrial television when the BBC secured 10 live Championship (second tier) games per season, as well as Football League highlights after Match of the Day. This is the first time that the BBC had the rights to the Football League, and ITV had lost them, in the Premier League era.
  - September – Channel 5 becomes the lead broadcaster of the UEFA Europa League meaning it can show the entire tournament, including the final. Previously it had only been able to show the early rounds due to the BBC or ITV having the rights from the quarter-finals onwards.

== 2010s ==
- 2010
  - 18 January – The BBC launches a regional football show to supplement its coverage of the Football League. Called Late Kick Off, the programmes follows a magazine-style format.
  - August –
    - Monday Night Football returns after Sky regains the rights to Monday night Premier League games.
    - S4C beings showing a live match from the Welsh Premier League each Saturday afternoon. The live match replaces a weekly 30-minute highlights programme.
  - 19 August – Premier Sports announces that it has bought the live and exclusive television rights to thirty matches per season from the Conference National for the next three seasons. The thirty matches selected for broadcast included all five Conference National play-offs.
- 2011
  - 8 January – The BBC launches a children's football magazine show Match of the Day Kickabout.
  - 13 April – ESPN shows the first of six matches from the newly formed FA Women's Super League.
- 2012
  - 9 May – Channel 5's fifteen years of showing Europe's second-tier football clubs competition ends when it shows live coverage of the 2012 UEFA Europa League Final. The primary rights transfer to ITV for the following three seasons with ESPN also broadcasting one match per round.
  - 12 June – The announcement of the rights to the Premier League for the next three seasons reveals that BT has won the rights to 38 matches each season. These rights are currently held by ESPN UK. The news followed speculation that ESPN was reconsidering its position in the UK.
  - 28 July – Football on 5 ends after the channel stops showing live football following the transfer of the UEFA Europa League to ITV. The last game shown is a pre-season friendly.
  - August – Match of the Day 2 moves to BBC One.
- 2013
  - January – Eurosport takes over as broadcaster of Serie A, opting to show a match at primetime whereas Channel 4 had shown its live coverage in the afternoon.
  - BBC Two broadcasts four programmes covering the FA Women's Super League.
  - August – BT Sport takes over as broadcaster of the Football Conference.
  - 1 August – BT Sport launches.
  - 9 November – BT announces a £897 million deal with UEFA to broadcast the Champions League and Europa League exclusively on BT Sport from the 2015–16 season for three years. The deal will end two decades of the competition being broadcast free-to-air on ITV, although BT stated that the finals of both competitions and at least one match per season involving each participating British team would still be broadcast free-to-air.
- 2014
  - 12 August – Sky launches Sky Sports 5, primarily to broadcast European football. Among the events shown on the new channel are the Eredivisie.
  - The BBC regains the rights to the FA Cup, which it shares with BT Sport. However ITV retains the contract to show live coverage of the England football team.
  - Premier Sports brings the Belgian Pro League to British screens for the first time.
- 2015
  - 25 May – Following the loss of rights to the Football League to Channel 5, The Football League Show and Late Kick Off end after six seasons. The principal reason for losing the rights because the BBC screened the highlights late at night whereas Channel 5 offered to show them at 9 pm.
  - 6 June – After 23 seasons, ITV's live broadcasting of the UEFA Champions League ends when it shows coverage of the 2015 UEFA Champions League Final. However it does continue to show highlights with all live coverage moving to BT Sport.
  - July – Premier Sports shows UEFA Champions League and UEFA Europa League qualifiers that include British teams. Premier Sports continues to show these early qualification matches to this day, with its coverage ending at the penultimate stage of qualifying.
  - 1 August – BT Sport launches a fourth channel – BT Sport Europe. The channel will be used to show its coverage of European football and European rugby union.
  - 2 August – BT Sport broadcasts the FA Community Shield for the first time.
  - 8 August – Football returns to Channel 5 when it takes over the contract to broadcast highlights of the Football League and the League Cup. It launches two new programmes under the revived Football on 5 banner. They are called The Championship and The Goal Rush. The programmes are broadcast from 9 pm on Saturday evening.
  - September – BT Sport becomes the exclusive broadcaster of both of UEFA's club competitions. Highlights continue to be shown on ITV.
  - Sky starts showing live coverage of Major League Soccer.
- 2016
  - 12 April – The Football Association confirms it has signed a new three-year contract with BT TV and the BBC to air coverage of the FA Cup, giving them the broadcasting rights to the competition until 2021. The deal will also see an increase in coverage of women's football by both broadcasters.
  - 22 May – BT Sport shows the finals of the FA Vase and FA Trophy as a double header. This builds upon BT's coverage of non-league cup football as the previous year BT had shown the final of the FA Trophy.
  - 11 June – Premier Sports begins covering Copa América.
  - 2 August – Premier Sports becomes one of the rights holders to the newly expanded Scottish Challenge Cup. It broadcasts games alongside other rights holders BBC Alba and S4C. Previously, BBC Alba had been the sole broadcaster of the competition.
  - 4 August – BT Sport Europe is rebranded as BT Sport 3 so that it can show the full range of coverage from BT Sport.
  - 13 August – BT Sport launches its football scores programme BT Sport Score.
  - 19 August – Live Premier League football is shown on Friday evenings on a semi-regular basis for the first time as part of the new broadcasting deal. It is the first of ten games that Sky will broadcast on Friday evenings.
  - 25 August – The BBC launches a new Premier League magazine show called The Premier League Show.
- 2017
  - 18 July – Sky Sports is revamped with the numbered channels being replaced by sports-specific channels. These include two channels dedicated to football, a cricket channel and a golf channel. Other sports are moved to two new channels – Action and Arena – and a showcase channel called Sky Sports Main Event is launched which features simulcasts of the top events being shown on Sky Sports that day. Also, Sky Sports News drops the HQ label.
  - September –
    - Sky shows the first of five matches a season from the NIFL Premiership.
    - The BBC begins showing regular live coverage of the FA Women's Super League with a weekly game shown live on the BBC Red Button. BT Sport also provides regular live coverage of the FAWSL and does so until the end of the 2020/21 season.
- 2018
  - 14 February – BT and Sky have agreed a £4.4bn three-year deal to show live Premiership football matches from 2019 to 2022, but the amount falls short of the £5.1bn deal struck in 2015.
  - 6 May – Football League Tonight is broadcast for the final time, thereby ending Channel 5's three-year deal to show highlights of the English Football League.
  - 9 May – The final edition of The Premier League Show is broadcast.
  - Sky's 20+ years of coverage of La Liga ends when the rights transfer to Eleven Sports. It also loses its rights to the Eredivise and the Chinese Super League to the new channel.
  - 7 June – It is announced that Amazon Prime has been awarded the rights to livestream 20 Premier League matches a season for the next three seasons.
  - August –
    - BT Sport becomes the exclusive holder of all rights to the UEFA Champions League. The deal includes live coverage and highlights. Consequently, for the first time, there is no free-to-air coverage of the competition.
    - Eleven Sports UK and Ireland launches following deals with European football leagues. The platform is a streaming service rather than a television channel.
  - 8 August – EFL on Quest is broadcast for the first time following the transfer of the highlights rights to the English Football League to Quest.
  - 6 September – Sky Sports becomes the exclusive broadcaster of football's new UEFA Nations League tournament.
  - November – Premier Sports announced a 6-year deal with the Scottish FA starting in 2019 to show the Scottish Cup. The exclusive live rights include the first 2 picks from rounds 4, last 16 and quarter-finals and first pick of a semi-final. There are also options to show matches in rounds 1–3 and the final and other semi-final non-exclusively with the BBC.
- 2019
  - January – Just four months after going on air, Eleven Sports relinquishes most of its football rights, passing many of them onto Premier Sports.
  - 9 May – The BBC broadcasts the final edition of The Premier League Show is broadcast.
  - 30 June – After 18 seasons on air, Chelsea TV closes as a linear channel It continues as an on-line only service.
  - 3 December – Amazon Prime shows its first set of live Premier League football matches.
  - 8 December – BT Sport broadcasts the Scottish League Cup for the final time. The rights transfer to Premier Sports.

== 2020s ==
- 2020
  - 13 January – Premier Sports launches La Liga TV, a full time channel showing Spain's La Liga.
  - February – FreeSports begins showing the Japanese J-league.
  - 30 May – FreeSports begins showing the Polish Ekstraklasa and Danish Superliga.
  - June – With the resumption of play in the 2019–20 Premier League due to the COVID-19 pandemic in the United Kingdom, the Premier League announces that it will show all remaining matches on British television, split primarily across Sky, BT, and Amazon. A large number of these matches are scheduled for free-to-air broadcasts, with Sky airing 25 on Pick, Amazon streaming its four matches on Twitch, and for the first time in league history, the BBC carries four live matches.
  - 16 June – Eurosport begins showing Norway's premier domestic football competition Eliteserien.
  - 1 August – Sky Sports becomes the exclusive broadcaster of live coverage of the Scottish Professional Football League. In recent seasons Sky had shared the rights with BT Sport.
  - 8 September – It is announced that all of September's Premier League fixtures will be shown on TV due to fans not being into stadiums due to the COVID-19 pandemic.
  - 6 October – Premier Sports takes over from BT Sport as broadcaster of the Scottish League Cup.
  - 9 October – The Premier League announces that October's games not scheduled for TV broadcast will be shown on a pay-per-view basis on either Sky Sports Box Office or BT Sport Box Office.
  - 13 November – The Premier League confirms that the broadcasting of matches via pay-per-view will end and that all games in December and January will be shown by either Sky Sports and BT Sport with one game also being shown on both Amazon Prime and the BBC and was later extended to cover the rest of the season.
  - 27 November – FreeSports begins showing matches from the 2020–21 Indian Super League season.
- 2021
  - January – BBC Sport shows South American football for the first time when it broadcasts the semi-finals and final of the 2020 Copa Libertadores.
  - 13 May – The Premier League announces that, for the first time, the next three-year broadcasting contact has been awarded without a bidding process. Consequently, the four rights holds – Sky Sports, BT Sport, Amazon Prime and BBC Sport – are paying the same amount for the same packages as they did for the 2019–2022 contact.
  - 13 June – 10 July – The BBC shows 2021 Copa America. This is the first time that the corporation has shown the tournament.
  - 7 August – After six years with BT Sport, the FA Community Shield returns to ITV Sport.
  - 13 August – Sky Sports replaces BT Sport as broadcaster of Germany's Bundesliga and Supercup.
  - 21 August – Serie A football returns to BT Sport after having been shown by other broadcasters since 2018. The new deal sees BT Sport showing six matches per round for the next three seasons.
  - 3 September – Sky Sports replaces BT Sport as the pay-TV broadcast partner of the FA Women's Super League. Sky will show two figures per round – a total of 44 games/season – with some matches simulcast on Sky One, and the BBC will show one fixture of which 18 of their 22 games will be on BBC One or BBC Two.
  - 17 September – ITV broadcasts coverage of the England women's national football team for the first time.
  - 7 November – The FA Cup returns to ITV in a new deal with the BBC which sees the two broadcasters sharing the rights to the competition. This is the first time since 1989 that the competition has been shown fully and exclusively on terrestrial television, and it is the first time that ITV has broadcast the FA Cup since 2014.
- 2022
  - 9 January – 6 February – The BBC and Sky Sports share coverage of the African Cup of Nations. The BBC will show two quarter-finals, both semi-finals and the final live.
  - 9 February – Channel 4 broadcasts Chelsea's matches in the 2021 FIFA Club World Cup. This is the first time that Channel 4 has broadcast this event.
  - 11 April – BT Sport secures the rights to show live coverage of the Canadian Premier League.
  - 1 June – Premier Sports begins broadcasting Scotland, Wales Northern Ireland and Republic of Ireland UEFA Nations League matches until 2024. The deal also includes live rights to all other matches involving non-UK teams inc Spain, Germany, Italy and Portugal.
  - 4 June – Channel 4 begins showing live coverage of the England men's football team, doing so for the first time as part of a two-year deal which will see Channel 4 broadcast England's matches in the UEFA Nations League, European Qualifiers to UEFA Euro 2024 and International Friendlies.
  - 31 July – Highlights rights to the English Football League and the League Cup move to ITV after four years on Quest.
  - 21 August – ITV shows the first of ten games from this season's LaLiga.
- 2023
  - 27 May – Soccer AM ends after 28 years.
  - 28 May – BT Sport Score is broadcast for the final time. The rolling scores and results programme ends as part of a review into non-live sports programming ahead of BT Sport becoming TNT Sports.
  - 20 July – 20 August – The BBC and ITV broadcast the 2023 FIFA Women's World Cup. Their coverage arrangement mirrors that of the men's World Cup with both broadcasters airing live coverage of the same number of games and both broadcasting the final live.
- 2024
  - August – Premier Sports starts broadcasting 20 matches per season from the Scottish Premiership, and streaming only rights for an additional 30 games from the Scottish League Cup
  - 9–11 August – Sky Sports live streams every match of the opening weekend of the 2024/25 EFL season live, including the games scheduled for 3 pm.
  - Live coverage of the England men's football team will return to ITV Sport after two years on Channel 4.
- 2025
  - January – Live league football is shown on ITV for the first time since 2002 when the broadcaster shows the first of five matches that it will air from the EFL Championship during the second half of the 2024–25 season.
  - August – ITV will broadcast ten EFL Championship games live for the next two seasons plus nine Carabao Cup matches, including two QF, one semi and the final. This is in addition to ITV showing highlights from both competitions.
  - August – The new arrangements for broadcasting of the Premier League sees a significant increase in the number of games broadcast on television, with all matches not kicking off at 3 pm on a Saturday now being broadcast live. Sky's number of matches will almost double and will now broadcast a minimum of 215 matches, up from 128, including all ten games from the final day of the season and the two midweek rounds previously shown by Amazon. TNT's total of 52 games/season remains the same. This arrangement runs until the end of the 2028/29 season.
  - 10 August – TNT Sports takes over as broadcaster of the FA Community Shield.
  - Some television coverage of the FA Cup goes back behind a paywall when TNT Sports begins a four-year deal with the Football Association to show the FA Cup.
  - 21 December–18 January 2026 – Channel 4 shows coverage of the 2025 Africa Cup of Nations.
- 2026
  - The BBC brings Italian football to its screens for viewers in Scotland after the BBC signs up Serie A for viewing on its Gaelic language channel. It shows eight matches towards the end of the 2025.26 season. The Corporation adds to this for the 2026/27 season and shows one live game per round - nineteen games on BBC iPlayer and nineteen on BBC Alba.
  - 22 February – The Women's FA Cup returns to Channel 4 for the next three seasons, replacing the BBC whose contract expired after the end of 2024–25 season.
  - 24 May – Football Focus ends after 52 years. The final edition is shown at the end of the 2025–26 football season.
  - 30 May – For the first time, the final of Europe's premier club football tournament is not available free-to-air after TNT Sports decides not to allow free access to the matches, despite all three featuring English teams. However Sky customers are able to see the games at no extra cost via HBO Max. and Virgin Media customers are able to view them via a pop-up channel. The other two European finals will be shown under the same arrangement, although highlights of the 2026 UEFA Champions League final will be shown on the BBC.
  - 15 August – Final Scores airtime on BBC One is expanded, now staring each week at 3.45pm, instead of 4.30pm. The programme now airs on BBC One Scotland as BBC Scotland's bespoke results coverage does not return for the 2026/27 season.
- 2027
  - TNT Sports will lose the rights to the European club football tournaments after the 2027 finals. The rights to the Champions League will transfer to streaming services – Amazon Prime will show one Tuesday fixture with Paramount+ broadcasting the remaining games – with the UEFA Europa League and UEFA Conference League moving to Sky Sports.

== See also ==
- English football on television
- Football in the United Kingdom
- Television in the United Kingdom
- Timeline of BBC Sport
- Timeline of ITV Sport
- Timeline of TNT Sports
- Timeline of Premier Sports
- Timeline of other British sports channels
