= Results Service =

British football news and results programme

Results Service was a British television programme that ran from October 1985 until the end of the 1991/92 football season on the ITV network late on Saturday afternoons during the football season.

== History ==
The programme began as a segment in the long-running programme World of Sport, a sports magazine programme that aired on the ITV network from 2 January 1965 to 28 September 1985. At around 16:45, when football matches across Britain were starting to finish, World of Sport would air Results Service, taking reports from major football matches before a full classified check read by Bob Colston.

Following World of Sport's demise, ITV committed itself to broadcast sport on Saturday afternoons, albeit as stand-alone programmes rather than as a magazine show. Typically, this would begin around midday with British wrestling (formerly a teatime staple on World of Sport), followed by Saint and Greavsie, a football preview show and successor to the On the Ball segment of World of Sport. This would often be followed by an hour of non-sports programming, typically an American adventure series like Airwolf, which would be followed by a two-hour block of sports programming, focusing on a single event from sports such as snooker, darts, athletics, gymnastics, ice skating or hockey, after which, at 16:45, Results Service would begin. Horse racing coverage, previously an integral part of World of Sport, had moved to Channel 4 prior to the cessation of World of Sport.

== Format ==
Throughout its history, the programme was usually presented by Elton Welsby, who, at its beginning, was making a name for himself at ITV Sport having already become firmly established as a presenter in the Granada Television region. Jim Rosenthal hosted the programme on occasions when Welsby was unavailable. In its early years, the theme tune was a variant of the 1983 World of Sport theme by Jeff Wayne, though two other themes were used in later years.

Football was always the predominant sport covered in the programme, though until the 1988/89 season, results of other sports, especially rugby union, cricket and snooker, also featured. Following ITV's contract to live and exclusive coverage of the Football League from the start of the 1988/89 season, the programme focussed almost entirely on football, and also included goal action from the day's matches, where video could be transported to the studios for broadcast in time.

Typically, the programme would begin with Welsby giving the latest scores, and in later years some goal action, followed by match reports from ITV commentators at the games, as well as from reporters working for various independent local radio stations around Britain, such as Tom Ross from BRMB or Richard Park from Radio Clyde. Bob Colston continued his role as reader of classified results throughout the programme's run, which he would do towards the end of the programme, after which Welsby would provide a run-down of the league tables and, when applicable, briefly preview the following Sunday's live match on ITV.

== Demise and aftermath ==
ITV lost the rights to top-flight football when the Premier League was formed in 1992, and therefore the decision was made to end the programme at the conclusion of the 1991/92 season.

From the start of the 1992/93 seasons, several ITV regions broadcast their own programmes called Goals Extra, and Welsby presented the Granada version of this programme for much of its run. Goals Extra featured results and reports from the Premier League, but actual action was restricted to goals from the lower divisions, as ITV still had access to the three remaining Football League divisions.

However, much of the country did not have a Goals Extra programme, so ITV chose to incorporate a football round-up into the teatime news bulletin from ITN, which would normally be broadcast at or close to 17:00. At the end of the news segment, the newscaster would hand over to a sports specialist, usually Graham Miller or David Bobin, for a roundup of the day's sports news, focussing heavily on football. This would include a full classified check, initially with Bob Colston continuing in his role, but later Miller, Bobin or whoever was presenting the bulletin would read it.

The ITN teatime classified results check continued into the new millennium, but from 1998, the newly launched ITV2 had a programme called Football First, which ran throughout Saturday afternoons, giving goal updates, analysis and a results check. Some ITV regions (Anglia, Meridian and HTV) showed the latter part of the programme from 2000 onwards, albeit sporadically. In 2001, it was renamed The Goal Rush, was broadcast on the main ITV channel, but by now it went off air prior to a full classified check, which was still part of the ITV News teatime news bulletin.

The Goal Rush was axed mid-season in 2003, and around this time ITN stopped providing a full classified check on the teatime news, though brief clips and major stories from the day's football remained.
