= Evertontv =

Online television channel

evertontv

- EvertonTV homepage
- Original author: Everton FC
- Developer: Rippleffect
- Operating system: Windows (XP and Vista); Macintosh
- Available in: English
- Type: Television
- Website: evertontv

evertontv (formerly ToffeeTV) is an online TV subscription channel. It allows people to view of Everton football match highlights and exclusive interviews.

The evertontv launched in conjunction with the newly designed evertonfc.com website.

Everton became one of the first clubs in the Premier League to provide live television content when they ‘webcast’ their pre-season friendlies from the United States in 2006.

A deal with Fox Sports was ensured meaning that the channel's programmes were given global distribution.

On the 11th of July, 2025, a paywall service named "evertontv+" was introduced, which replaced the previous free on registration model. It restricted access to live audio commentary and full match replays. If you had a previous Forever Blue membership of any tier, you'd be granted an annual membership to evertontv+. A standalone package was also brought in, only giving you access to the service and nothing extra.

== Commentators/Presenters ==
- Elton Welsby
