= World of Sport (British TV programme) =

ITV Saturday afternoon sports show (1965–85)

- Dickie Davies in the World of Sport studio, c. 1973
- Presented by: Eamonn Andrews; Dickie Davies; Fred Dinenage; Steve Rider; Jim Rosenthal; Elton Welsby; Gerald Sinstadt
- Country of origin: United Kingdom
- Original language: English
- No. of episodes: 1067

Production
- Production locations: Teddington Studios (1965–1968); Wembley Studios (1968–1972); South Bank Television Centre (1972–1985); Thames Television House (Bank holidays, 1968–1985)
- Running time: Various
- Production companies: ABC (1965–1968); LWT (1968–1985); Thames (Bank holidays, 1968–1985)

Original release
- Network: ITV
- Release: 2 January 1965 – 28 September 1985

World of Sport is a British television sport programme which ran on ITV between 2 January 1965 and 28 September 1985 in competition with the BBC's Grandstand. Like Grandstand, the programme ran throughout Saturday afternoon.

From the programme's launch until the lifting of restrictions on broadcasting hours in 1972, sports coverage was one of the few programming areas which was exempt from the restrictions. Originally sporting coverage and outside broadcasts were provided with a separate quota of broadcasting hours per year. By the start of World of Sport this amounted to 350 hours per year. This meant World of Sport was a key part of ITV's Saturday schedules, as the time the programme was on the air did not count to the overall 50 hours a week restriction on normal broadcasting hours.

Professional wrestling was a major component of World of Sport and one of its most popular features, occupying a regular segment of the programme from its early years until its final broadcast in 1985. It provided British professional wrestling with a mass television audience and played a central role in its popularity and commercial success. The programme's wrestling coverage became an important institution, helping to establish the sport as a prominent part of British popular culture during the post-war period. The World of Sport brand was revived in 2016 as World of Sport Wrestling, focusing exclusively on professional wrestling rather than the original programme's wider range of sports. The revival ran from 2016 to 2024.

== Early years ==
Eamonn Andrews was the first host and the programme itself was "compiled for Independent Television" by ABC Weekend TV from its Teddington Studios, with the other ITV stations contributing footage of events in their regions. Before World of Sport, sports events had been shown across the ITV network on Saturdays as separate programmes. From the summer of 1968, after ABC lost its franchise, it was produced by London Weekend Television (LWT) under the ITV Sport banner and hosted by Dickie Davies, who would remain the face of the show until it ended in 1985. Other World of Sport presenters were Fred Dinenage, Steve Rider and Jim Rosenthal. Bob Colston read the classified results and he and John Tyrrell, who read the horse racing results, were the regular results announcers throughout the duration of World of Sport, although from 1983, Elton Welsby began alternating with Colston.

Because LWT held a weekend-only broadcast franchise, Thames Television produced bank holiday editions, which were renamed Bank Holiday Sport and later Bank Holiday Sports Special. They were also generally presented by Davies, with Steve Rider occasionally presenting a bank holiday edition.

STV and Grampian sometimes opted out and showed their own version, billed as Scotsport Special which was presented by Arthur Montford from the STV studios in Glasgow, Scotsport Special did include some live coverage from England of events which were often not shown in their entirety due to the regional sporting events taking place in Scotland. Scotsport Special was also aired on Cup Final day, when the Scottish Cup Final was taking place on the same day as the Wembley event, with the Wrestling also being moved from its pre-lunchtime slot on Cup Final days back to the expected 16:00 slot in Scotland.

The 500th edition was transmitted on 7 September 1974, and the 1000th edition was transmitted on 16 June 1984.

== Features ==
Most of the show was focussed around three popular segments – On the Ball (a preview of the day's football action), the ITV Seven (horse racing), and wrestling with commentator Kent Walton - alongside a results section to close the programme. Coverage of other sports was mostly restricted to the part of the first hour of the programme, and the 3pm hour. The BBC had purchased the rights to as many established events as it could and a joke of the period was that the BBC were going through the list of sports in alphabetical order and had run out of money before it reached wrestling which is how ITV got it. Therefore, output often showcased sports not seen elsewhere, such as women's hockey, netball, lacrosse, water skiing and stock car racing or sports that were not popular with the British mainstream, such as NASCAR and ice speedway. It also featured bizarre sports like the World Barrel Jumping Championships, and even death-defying stunts. In its early years, show jumping, and other equestrian events, were often aired, and towards the end of its life, snooker was shown extensively.

Two sports in particular, ten-pin bowling and kart racing, benefited from television exposure to a British public hitherto unaware of them. Whilst the majority of ten-pin bowling shown from 1965 onwards focused on regional league competitions in the UK, a surge in popularity in the sport in the UK in the mid-1970s led to footage from the biennial WTBA World Championship, and telecasts from the US Professional Bowlers Tour, being included increasingly in later years (Mark Roth becoming the first bowler to convert a 7 – 10 split on television on 5 January 1980 at the ARC Alameda Open in Alameda, California, was possibly the best-remembered of the US telecasts shown on the programme). British stock car drivers such as Barry Lee also greatly benefited from the show's exposure.

The programme did occasionally acquire the rights to major sporting events, such as the Tour de France and the Ryder Cup and each year, the FA Cup Final featured on World of Sport, with the BBC and ITV often competing for viewers by broadcasting unusual features with early starts to their broadcasts to entice viewers to watch their coverage. The only other football match that would be shown live on the programme would be the England v Scotland match in the Home International Championship which from 1971 to 1982 was shared with the BBC, and the 1984 match, which was the final match in the last ever Home International Championship, was live as part of World of Sport (from 1983 to 1988 BBC and ITV would screen the England v Scotland match on alternate years rather than jointly showing). Schoolboy England Internationals from Wembley were shown on an exclusive basis and whenever ITV showed a World Cup or a European Championship finals tournament match live and the kick off time fell within World of Sport's timeslot, the programme would sometimes be extended. Examples of this was West Germany v England in the Quarter Final second leg of UEFA Euro 1972, Bulgaria v Sweden, Poland v Argentina, Scotland v Yugoslavia, and the third place play off in the 1974 FIFA World Cup, and Poland v Cameroon in the 1982 FIFA World Cup.

A typical edition would be broadcast between 12:15 and 17:10 and would take on the following format.

12:20 On The Ball – football preview with Brian Moore and in later years Ian St. John and Jimmy Greaves.
13:00 Sports Special 1 – A wide array of sports, often including clips from US show Wide World of Sports some major sports Motor Racing, Show Jumping, Tennis, Motorcycle Racing, Cycling would feature regularly. Less prominent sports such as darts, snooker, bowls, water skiing, speedway, rallying and others would also feature. Sometimes Boxing would also be shown in this slot.
13:15 ITN News
13:20 ITV Racing.
15:00 Sports Special 2 – see Sports Special 1.
15:45 Half-Time Scores – the half-time scores from that day's football, plus racing results from races that had taken place in the previous hour.
16:00 Wrestling – a mainstay of the World of Sport schedule from 1965 until it ended. Many of the wrestlers featured became household names in the UK and the greatest rivalry was between Big Daddy and Giant Haystacks.
16:45 Results Service – all the full-time football scores, match reports and league tables plus the last of the day's horse racing results.

== Demise ==
By the mid-1980s, ITV Sport felt that it should be focussing on live sporting action of a specific sporting event rather than a mix of highlights and horse racing, and so after a 20-year run, the programme ended on 28 September 1985.

== Theme tune and opening ==
World of Sport had a theme tune and opening credits which featured the ITV Sport logo and the programme name as trailing banners from white Piper Super Cub light aircraft. Before this there was another intro with a clay pigeon shooter which shot a clay pigeon with the then ITV Sport "S" logo which when hit would zoom in ITV Presents The long running theme "World of Sport March", used between 1968 and 1983, was composed by Don Harper; a re-recorded version of the tune was introduced in the early 1980s accompanied by a new title sequence opening with a view of the Earth eclipsing the sun.

The advent of computer-generated imagery saw a new opening title sequence appear in 1983 together with a more contemporary theme tune composed by Jeff Wayne, this lasted until the series ended in 1985.

Wayne also composed a new theme tune for the opening and closing credits to the Results Service during its period as a standalone programme between 1985 and 1992. Previously a simple, ten-second musical and visual sting had been used to introduce the Results Service during the World of Sport programme itself.

== Incidents ==
- On 11 May 1985, World of Sport switched its coverage to Valley Parade stadium as match commentator John Helm, who had been covering the game for Yorkshire Television, described the events of the Bradford City stadium fire as it unfolded.
- The comedian Eric Morecambe appeared as a guest on the Christmas Eve edition of World of Sport in 1977 causing mayhem by entertaining and trying to disrupt his friend Dickie Davies' presentation links.
- The show featured rows of typists sitting behind the main presenter, mainly preparing items for the show. This was parodied by French and Saunders in the sketch Sports Report and featured their recurring "Extras" characters attempting to get their faces on television.

== Post-closure ==
Sport continued to be a major part of ITV's Saturday afternoon for the next few years with football coverage topping and tailing Saturday afternoon output until 1992.

After the lunchtime ITN News summary, previous On the Ball hosts Ian St. John and Jimmy Greaves got their own stand-alone programme, Saint and Greavsie. It continued with its format of football news, action and live chat. It enjoyed a successful run that ended in 1992 when Sky Sports gained exclusive rights to broadcast English top-flight football.

Wrestling with Kent Walton would follow immediately after Saint and Greavsie, before being dropped in December 1988 just before the popularity of the US World Wrestling Federation promotion (now World Wrestling Entertainment) started to gain momentum in the UK via coverage on Sky Television from early 1989. During this period, matches from Joint Promotions, who previously held exclusive rights to ITV coverage, were supplemented with matches from rival promotion All Star Wrestling. It was originally planned to bring US wrestling to viewers on average of once a month in this slot—three weeks of the UK version and one of the American version - but the US version only appeared on a total of six occasions in the two years that it played in that slot. The move to a permanent lunchtime slot, as it had generally been for several months previously, badly decimated wrestling's ratings as it had a primarily working-class audience, much of which worked half-day shifts on Saturday mornings. Greg Dyke, who was in charge of the scheduling, felt that sports such as wrestling and darts were "too working class".

After the wrestling, two non-sporting programmes would then be aired so as not to clash with horse racing, which by now had been moved to Channel 4.

Next would be the two-hour live broadcast with coverage of sports such as athletics, darts, ice skating and snooker being shown. with a single event being shown for two hours. However, this gradually diminished after a few years and eventually disappeared from the schedules.

Saturday afternoon sport on ITV would conclude with the Results Service. Lasting for 15 minutes, it was presented by Elton Welsby with Jim Rosenthal hosting in Welsby's absence. As with Saint & Greavsie, the programme ended at the end of the 1991/92 season. The football results were then featured on ITV as part of the Saturday teatime ITN Evening News & Sport bulletin until 2001.

== Later years ==
Between 1992 and 1995, several ITV regions screened rival US promotion World Championship Wrestling's programme WCW Worldwide in the old Saturday afternoon slot, having previously transmitted the promotion as late-night viewing. In the mid 2000s, The Wrestling Channel, later The Fight Network, purchased the broadcasting rights to World of Sport's wrestling shows until the channel stopped transmitting. It was then shown on UK satellite channel Men and Movies. Joint Promotions closed in February 1995 upon promoter Max Crabtree's retirement, although All Star Wrestling remains active at grassroots level as of 2026, despite the death of founding promoter Brian Dixon in 2023, weeks after that of Crabtree.

On the Ball was later relaunched by ITV in 1998 as a half-hour football magazine programme on Saturday lunchtimes. When ITV secured the rights to highlights of FA Premiership football beginning from the 2001/02 season, On the Ball was revamped into an hour long programme. The programme was axed at the end of the 2003/04 season, after the rights to Premiership highlights were regained by the BBC.

Following the launch of ITV2 in 1998, a football results programme was included as part of its initial Saturday afternoon schedule entitled Football First. When ITV refreshed its football offering for the 2001/02 season, this was relaunched as The Goal Rush and began on ITV2 before switching over to ITV1 when the matches were approaching full time. The programme ended in December 2003 ahead of ITV losing the rights to Premiership highlights at the end of the 2003/04 season.

ITV paid tribute to World of Sport as part of its 50th anniversary celebrations in September 2005. Various tie-in publications including World of Sport Annuals, and a companion book, were published throughout its run.

== Relaunch of wrestling segment ==
On 17 October 2016, ITV announced that they would be bringing back professional wrestling, arguably World of Sport's most popular segment. They announced they would be recording a pilot episode on 1 November 2016, being filmed at MediaCityUK in Salford. The show featured independent wrestlers such as El Ligero, Grado, and Sha Samuels. ITV also announced that former WWE commentator Jim Ross would call the pilot episode. It aired on New Year's Eve on ITV, where Grado won the World of Sport Championship. The following year on 23 March, Impact Wrestling (formerly known as TNA/Total Nonstop Action Wrestling) announced that they would be teaming with ITV to yet again bring back the show with Jeff Jarrett as an executive producer as a ten-episode series. The show was announced to be taping at Preston Guild Hall on 25 May, and 26 May. TNA talents such as Grado and Magnus (in his debut for the series) along with independent wrestlers such as El Ligero, Sha Samuels returning to the series, were confirmed to be part of the series cast. On 4 May 2017 ITV and Impact Wrestling announced that the tapings scheduled for 25 and 26 May at Preston Guild Hall had been postponed indefinitely due to prolonged contract negotiations.

In April 2018 ITV announced World of Sport Wrestling would air a ten-part series later in the year on Saturday afternoons. The shows were taped in Norwich from 10–12 May. Jim Ross was not involved, and neither was Impact Wrestling. World of Sport Wrestling aired from 28 July 2018 at 17:00 on ITV until 29 September 2018. A six-date live tour of the show took place during January/February 2019.

== See also ==
- Professional wrestling in the United Kingdom
- List of professional wrestling television series
