= The Premiership (TV programme) =

British television sports programme (2001–2004)

- Presented by: Des Lynam; Gabby Logan
- Starring: Ally McCoist; Andy Townsend; Barry Venison; Ron Atkinson; Terry Venables
- Theme music composer: Bono
- Opening theme: "Beautiful Day" by U2
- Country of origin: United Kingdom

Production
- Running time: Variable

Original release
- Network: ITV
- Release: 18 August 2001 – 15 May 2004

Related
- The Premiership on Monday; On the Ball; The Goal Rush; Match of the Day

The Premiership (also known as The Premiership on ITV) is a television programme which showed highlights of the FA Premier League. It was ITV Sport's flagship football show from August 2001 to May 2004. The show was created after the ITV network won a multimillion-pound deal to air Premier League highlights once owned by the BBC. The programme was presented by Des Lynam, with Gabby Logan as a stand-in and Ally McCoist, Ron Atkinson, Terry Venables, Barry Venison and Andy Townsend frequently serving as pundits.

The Premiership ended in 2004, when the rights returned to the BBC from the 2004–05 season.

== Background ==
Match of the Day, the BBC's long-running football programme, was in its eighth year of terrestrial Premier League coverage and about to start a record ninth in 2000. Bidding for a further three seasons to the Premier League panel, the broadcaster went in as favourites to retain the exclusive highlights package. The contract was however awarded to rival network ITV at the last possible moment, outbidding their rivals by £60 million and securing the rights from the start of the 2001–02 league season at a reported cost of £183 million. This meant that they were splashing out roughly £1.3m per show.

In June 2001, ITV secured a three-year deal with the soft drink corporation Coca-Cola to help sponsor their new programme. At a fee of £50 million, it was the biggest sports sponsorship deal in British television history and was enough to overcome competition from rivals Pepsi and Budweiser. A remixed version of U2's Grammy Award-winning track, "Beautiful Day" was selected as the show's signature tune. To reflect the supplementary changes on the network, ITV extended their lunchtime football show, On The Ball to an hour and introduced The Goal Rush, which was billed as the fastest and most comprehensive results service in the country.

== Format ==
ITV decided to air the show on Saturdays at 7pm, the earliest time permitted by their joint broadcasting partner BSkyB. Their initial plan to broadcast the programme an hour earlier at 6pm was blocked by Sky.

An extended late-night edition of the show was also broadcast on Saturdays (its first edition at 11:15pm).). It included further highlights, post match interviews and comments from Sunday newspapers.

In order to cut back on the department's resources, ITV decided to send four of its commentators, Clive Tyldesley, Jon Champion, Peter Drury and Guy Mowbray, to the high profiled matches of the weekend. Gabriel Clarke, Ned Boulting and other freelancing reporters provided match reports for the other games in addition to opinions from both sets of fans and interviews with the managers and players.

Fans were promised technological advances in the coverage such as player tracking to aid analysis of the match. On Monday nights, The Premiership Parliament, later titled The Premiership on Monday was presented by Ally McCoist and Gabby Logan and featured 20 fans – one representative from each club to debate about the weekend's action.

=== Reception and later airtime ===
The first show aired at 7pm on 18 August 2001 and was presented by Des Lynam. The main game featured was Middlesbrough and Arsenal at the Riverside Stadium with commentary provided by Peter Drury. Liverpool's home fixture against West Ham United was the other featured game, broadcast towards the end of the programme.

The Premiership was watched by a peak figure of five million viewers, in comparison to The Weakest Link which drew an average of seven million when shown on rival channel BBC One at the same time. Despite ITV declaring that it was a positive start to the season, media and football critics – most notably the Daily Mirror - were outspoken about the programme's highlights. Out of the 70 minutes on air, the first show included only 28 minutes of action, compared to the average of 58 minutes on Match of the Day the previous season.

Many football fans bemoaned that what should have been the featured game, Bolton Wanderers' 5–0 drubbing of Leicester City at Filbert Street, only got the briefest of autodubs by Gabriel Clarke and analysis from the studio which lasted for about two minutes. The overuse of football technology to support the decisions was also controversial in spite of praise by top league managers such as Arsène Wenger and Sir Alex Ferguson.

A week later saw ITV suffer their worst Saturday night ratings for five years when an average of 3.1 million viewers watched The Premiership. After two months, figures had not greatly improved: only 4.6 million viewers tuned in, and the 7pm slot was a clear failure.

The decision was made in early October 2001 to shift The Premiership from its original slot to a permanent later time of 10:30pm, from 17 November, with repeats shown early on Sunday mornings.
