= On the Ball (British TV programme) =

- Genre: Sports programme
- Presented by: Brian Moore; Ian St John; Jimmy Greaves; Gabby Logan; Barry Venison
- Country of origin: United Kingdom
- Original language: English

Original release
- Network: ITV
- Release: 1965 – 1985; 5 September 1998 – 15 May 2004

On the Ball (abbreviated to OTB) is an English ITV Saturday lunchtime television show about football, which ran as part of World of Sport from 1968 until the mid 1980s, and as a stand-alone show from 5 September 1998 to 15 May 2004. There was another ITV television show called On the Ball which was a game show hosted by Nick Weir in 1997, shown only in the Granada region.

== Overview ==
The original On the Ball was a half hour football round-up segment shown as part of the World of Sport Saturday afternoon sports programming on ITV, preceding the traditional Saturday afternoon 3pm kick off time. Initially presented by Brian Moore, it was later hosted by Ian St John and Jimmy Greaves. When World of Sport was discontinued in 1985, On the Ball was replaced by Saint and Greavsie, a stand-alone lunchtime football show hosted by the same presenters. Saint and Greavsie ended in 1992 when Sky Sports gained the rights to broadcast Premier League football, although ITV lunchtime coverage of football continued with occasional Champions League shows.

On the Ball was revived on ITV from the beginning of the 1998–99 season, presented by Gabby Logan, initially co-presented by Barry Venison. The show was extended to an hour in 2001, coinciding with ITV's capture of the Premier League highlights package from the BBC which also saw the launch of The Goal Rush Saturday afternoon results show and The Premiership Saturday evening show. On the Ball was discontinued again in 2004 after the BBC regained the rights to the Premier League.

== See also ==
- English football on television
- Grandstand, BBC Saturday sports programme
- Football Focus, BBC Saturday lunchtime football show
