= Busman's Holiday =

British television game show (1985–1993)

- Presented by: Julian Pettifer; Sarah Kennedy; Elton Welsby
- Announcer: Charles Foster
- Country of origin: United Kingdom
- Original language: English
- No. of series: 8
- No. of episodes: 103

Production
- Running time: 30 minutes (inc. adverts)
- Production company: Granada Television

Original release
- Network: ITV
- Release: 26 February 1985 – 28 June 1993

Busman's Holiday is a British television game show produced by Granada Television for the ITV network from 26 February 1985 to 28 June 1993. Its hosts over the years were Julian Pettifer (1985–88), Sarah Kennedy (1989–91) and Elton Welsby (1993). Charles Foster was the announcer.

== Title ==
A busman's holiday is a period of holiday or leisure time spent doing something similar to one's normal occupation.

== Format ==
Contestants were divided into competing teams of three based upon career, at first three teams and later in the series just two teams. They were dressed in their regular work clothes. The winning team went on an exotic holiday where they had to work, to learn how their jobs were performed in other locations.

The format of the programme consisted of multiple rounds of quizzing: world geography, questions of the other's profession or brain teasers, questions of their own profession—sometimes quite embarrassing, and questions on a final destination—revealing which team had conducted the best research prior to the match. There was also a review of the prior week's winning contestants' holiday.

== Transmissions ==
Series	Start date	End date	Episodes
1	26 February 1985	21 May 1985	13
2	7 January 1986	1 April 1986	13
3	6 January 1987	24 March 1987	12
4	11 February 1988	5 May 1988	13
5	8 March 1989	31 May 1989	13
6	25 April 1990	18 July 1990	13
7	12 June 1991	28 August 1991	13
8	5 April 1993	28 June 1993	13
