= Julian Pettifer =

English journalist and television presenter (born 1935)

Julian Pettifer OBE
- Born: 21 July 1935 (age 91); Malmesbury, Wiltshire, England
- Occupations: Television and radio journalist, environmentalist
- Relatives: Stephen Henry Pettifer (father, 1895–1977); Diana Mary Burton (mother, 1912–2003); Stephen (brother)

Julian Pettifer (born 21 July 1935) is an English television and radio journalist.

Pettifer was president of the Royal Society for the Protection of Birds and is vice president of the Royal Society of Wildlife Trusts and the RSPB. He was voted BAFTA 'Reporter of the Year' for his coverage of the war in Vietnam in 1968.

== Early life and education ==
Pettifer was born in Malmesbury, Wiltshire, and was educated at Marlborough College and St John's College, Cambridge.

== Career ==
Pettifer started work in television during the early days of ITV, as one of the original Southern Television announcers in 1958. He later moved to the BBC as a globe-trotting reporter for programmes such as Tonight, 24 Hours and Panorama.

Pettifer was the host for the British television show Busman's Holiday from 1985 to 1988. The show was produced by Granada Television and ran on the ITV network.

Pettifer also wrote and presented a number of documentaries for both BBC and ITV, including Diamonds in the Sky, on the subject of international air travel; Automania, a history of the motor car, and Missionaries.

A growing interest in the environment led to him writing and presenting programmes about the environment and wildlife, including Naturewatch for Central Television and Nature and The Living Isles for the BBC. He continued to report on current affairs, contributing reports for BBC Two's Assignment and Correspondent programmes, and a highly praised film for Channel 4 that re-examined the reporting of the Vietnam war. He presented BBC Radio 4's Asiafile and Crossing Continents.

== Honours ==
Pettifer was appointed Officer of the Order of the British Empire (OBE) in the 2010 Birthday Honours.

Pettifer served as president of the Royal Society for the Protection of Birds and is vice president of the Royal Society of Wildlife Trusts.

Pettifer was awarded the Royal Geographical Society's Cherry Kearton Medal and Award in 1990

Pettifer was voted BAFTA 'Reporter of the Year' for his coverage of the war in Vietnam in 1968.
