= Bob Colston =

British sportscaster

Robert Colston (27 June 1928 – 24 March 2013) was a broadcaster who was famous in the United Kingdom as the voice of the football results on ITV's various Saturday afternoon football results programmes for 27 years between 1972 and 1999.

Colston joined World of Sport in 1972 and read out the football results until the programme was cancelled in 1985. He continued to read the results as ITV broadcast the football scores in a stand-alone programme called Results Service which ran until 1992. The results were then featured during the Saturday teatime ITV News bulletin which Colston did until 1999. He made brief appearances on Sky Sports reading out the football results on Soccer Saturday during the 2000–01 season.

Whilst reading the results, Colston inflected his voice to imply the result of a match simply through his sonorous intonation of the home team's score. Unlike Len Martin, who surpassed his longevity on the BBC's rival programme Grandstand from its inception in 1958 until his death in 1995, Colston would use abbreviations for some teams such as "Spurs" which would allow him to read the results more quickly than Martin.
