= English football on television =

English football on television has been broadcast since 1938. Since the establishment of the Premier League in 1992, English football has become a very lucrative industry. As of the 2013–14 season, domestic television rights for the 20-team Premier League are worth £1 billion a year. The league generates €2.2 billion per year in domestic and international television rights.

== Early history ==
=== Early years ===
The BBC started its television service in 1936, although it was nearly a year before the very first televised match of football was screened – a specially-arranged friendly match between Arsenal and Arsenal Reserves at Highbury on 16 September 1937. This was followed by the first live televised international match, between England and Scotland on 9 April 1938, and the first televised FA Cup final followed on 30 April 1938, between Huddersfield Town and Preston North End.

On 19 October 1946, the first live televised football match since the war was broadcast by the BBC from Underhill Stadium in Barnet. Twenty minutes of the first half and thirty-five minutes of the second half of Barnet's Athenian League match against Wealdstone were broadcast before it became too dark.

The first FA Cup tie other than the final to be shown was a fifth round match between Charlton Athletic and Blackburn Rovers on 8 February 1947, but matches were sparing and for technical reasons only games in London could be broadcast.

=== The dawn of regular coverage ===
The advent of floodlighting led to the creation of the European Cup, designed as a midweek cup competition for the champions of European nations, in 1955. The newly formed British television station ITV saw televised football as an ideal way of gaining a share of the audience from their only rival broadcaster, the BBC. The BBC, meanwhile, started showing brief five-minute highlights of matches on its Saturday night Sports Special programme from 10 September 1955 until its cancellation in 1963. The first games featured were both from the First Division – Luton Town v Newcastle United and Charlton Athletic v Everton. Kenneth Wolstenholme and Cliff Michelmore were the commentators.

An early attempt at live league football was made in 1960–61, when ITV agreed a deal worth £150,000 with the Football League to screen 26 matches; the very first live league match was on Saturday 10 September 1960 between Blackpool and Bolton Wanderers at Bloomfield Road. The match kicked off at 18:50, with live coverage starting at 19:30 under the title The Big Game. A major blow to the TV moguls was the absence of big box-office draw Stanley Matthews through injury, and the game ended 1–0 to Bolton in front of a sparse crowd.

However, ITV withdrew from the deal after first Arsenal and then Tottenham Hotspur refused them permission to broadcast at their matches against Newcastle United and Aston Villa respectively, and the Football League demanded a dramatic increase in player appearance payments. Both matches received highlights coverage from the BBC on Sports Special instead.

While ITV continued to show occasional live matches from other competitions, two of the regional companies began transmitting weekly highlights from the Football League in the 1962-63 season. Tyne Tees Television was first to launch. Their programme Shoot began on Sunday 26 August 1962, broadcasting filmed excerpts of matches in the north-east of England. On the first edition, Leeds United’s 1-0 win over Sunderland and brief highlights of Newcastle United’s match with Portsmouth were shown.

Anglia Television launched Match of the Week five weeks later, which showed highlights of matches from around East Anglia. It is often written that the first match shown was Ipswich Town's 3–2 defeat at the hands of Wolves at Portman Road on 22 September 1962. However, this was a pilot programme and was not transmitted. The first edition was shown a week later, featuring Norwich City’s match with Derby County. Anglia’s debut programme, directed by Bob Gardam, was a pioneering one. This was the first time an edited football match, recorded on videotape, had been shown on television anywhere in the world.

League football was soon to gain a nationwide audience once more. In 1964, the BBC introduced Match of the Day – originally shown on BBC2 and intended to train BBC cameramen for the forthcoming 1966 World Cup. The first match was Liverpool's 3–2 victory over Arsenal at Anfield on 22 August, and the estimated audience of 20,000 was considerably less than the number of paying customers at the ground. At the time BBC2 could only be received in the London area, although by the end of Match of the Day's first season it could be received in the Midlands. The programme transferred to BBC1 in the wake of England's 1966 World Cup win and at last could be received by television viewers across the UK.

=== The World Cup ===
There was live coverage of World Cup football on UK screens in 1954 and 1958 – however only selected matches were available. In 1954, Kenneth Wolstenholme provided commentary on the few televised matches for BBC from Switzerland – including the quarter-final between Hungary and Brazil. A thunderstorm over the Alps cut off the picture and many irate viewers wrote in to complain that the BBC had "pulled the plug". The 1958 tournament in Sweden saw a greater range of matches thanks to the new Eurovision Network; the BBC and ITV both screened matches, although the networks had to overcome opposition to the coverage from the Scottish FA, who were worried that attendances at junior football matches might be affected. The 1962 World Cup in Chile was covered in delayed form by the BBC with film having to be carried by air via the United States back to Britain. Matches were generally seen three days after they were played.

With intercontinental communications satellites in their infancy and videotape a new advance, the first tournament to gain widespread international live coverage was the 1966 tournament, which was held in England. The tournament, which England won, increased the popularity of the sport. With more football viewers than ever, Match of the Day thrived, switching from BBC2 to BBC1 to reach a wider audience. ITV's regional coverage had also expanded during this period, with London weekend company ATV launching Star Soccer in October 1965, Southern Television's Southern Soccer and ABC's World of Soccer also began to appear regularly in the TV Times Sunday schedules. London Weekend Television's The Big Match started in 1968, and eventually the entire ITV network's football coverage would be broadcast under its title.

=== Rise of live League coverage ===
The demand for live televised football grew in the wake of England’s World Cup success, though the authorities remained reluctant. In April 1967, the Football League Management Committee rejected a £1m offer from BBC Television to show live League football on Thursday nights. They did, however, experiment with pay-per-view broadcasting. Several League Cup ties and the First Division match between Sheffield United and Sheffield Wednesday were screened live on Pay-TV, available only in Westminster and Sheffield, in the 1966-67 season.

Television coverage was threatened in 1983 by a bid from Telejector, to screen live League football exclusively in pubs, bars and clubs. However, the authorities decided to maintain their relationship with BBC and ITV and a deal was struck for the start of the 1983–84 campaign that allowed both companies to screen five live League matches per season. The first live league match on free-to-air television since 1960 was screened on ITV, between Tottenham Hotspur and Nottingham Forest, on 2 October 1983. Spurs would also feature in the BBC's first live league match at Manchester United on a Friday night a few weeks later.

By the late 1980s the value of live TV coverage had rocketed; while a two-year contract for rights in 1983 had cost just £5.2m, the four-year contract exclusively landed by ITV in 1988 cost £44m, a fourfold increase per year. This entitled the network to screen 18 live League matches per season, usually beginning in late autumn, plus a semi-final and final of the League Cup. Combined with BBC’s FA Cup coverage from the Third Round onwards, live top class football became a regular fixture in the Sunday afternoon schedules.

With top-flight football proving particularly lucrative, in 1992 the clubs of the First Division voted to quit the league en masse and set up their own league, the Premier League. They eventually opted to agree a deal with Sky Sports rather than ITV or the BBC, meaning leading live top-flight football was no longer available on terrestrial television. ITV continued to show second tier matches on a regional basis for the next five seasons until they also transferred to Sky Sports, apart from one season (2001–02) when they were shown on its unsuccessful ITV Digital platform.

== Premier League era ==
=== Football on television today ===
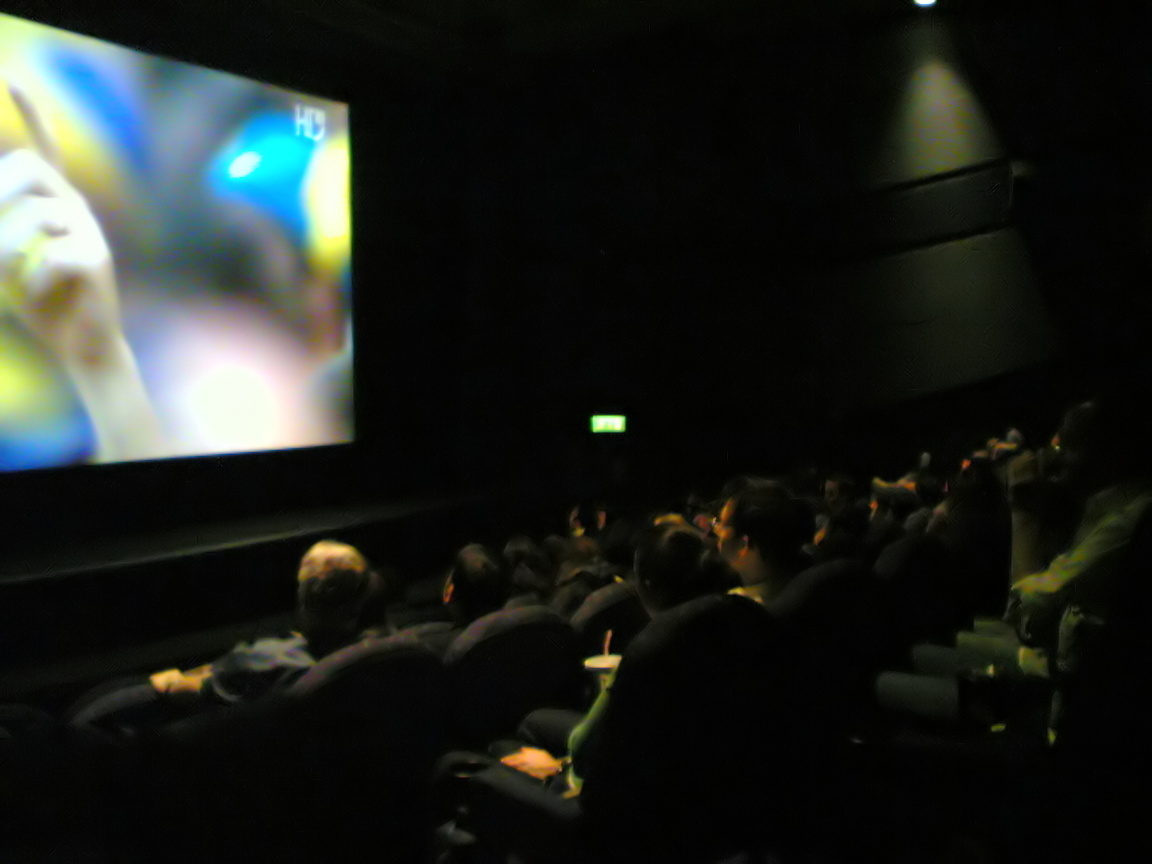
Fans watch an England international in HDTV in a cinema, 2006

Coverage of Premier League now dominates football on English television, especially in financial terms; the contracts agreed between the league and broadcasters BSkyB in 1992 and 1997 were worth £191.5m and £670m respectively. Sky were also able to show more live games than previously, with several games live on many matchdays (originally Sundays and Mondays). However, the European Union objected to what it saw as a monopoly on television rights and demanded the 2007 contract be split into separate packages of 23 games; eventually Sky won four of the six available packages, with the other two awarded to Setanta Sports. Setanta went bankrupt in 2009 with its packages taken over by ESPN. From 2010/11, Sky had five packages and ESPN had one. The top tier still has a presence on terrestrial television in highlights form on Match of the Day.

From the 2009/10 season, live coverage of the Football League returned to British terrestrial television for the first time since 2001, with the BBC securing ten live Championship (second tier) games per season, as well as Football League highlights after Match of the Day. Sky also showed live lower league football, while Setanta also showed large numbers of Conference National games before the channel's demise.

There is also extensive coverage of numerous Cup competitions. Every match in the Champions League and the Europa League is available on TNT Sports. BBC and ITV broadcast the FA Cup, while Sky show the EFL Cup and EFL Trophy.

=== Premier League satellite decoder case ===
English football on television
- Court: European Court of Justice
- Citations: C-403/08; C-429/08

The Premier League holds an exclusive contract with broadcasters British Sky Broadcasting. Some public houses install foreign satellite television decoders hardware to enable customers to watch live Premier League games in their establishment.

The Court of Justice of the European Union has ruled that EU law on the free movement of goods should be applied to the decoder cards.

In 2007 Karen Murphy, a Portsmouth publican, was convicted under s297(1) of the Copyright, Designs and Patents Act 1988 (CDPA), in that on two occasions she: ‘… dishonestly received a programme included in a broadcasting service provided from a place in the United Kingdom with intent to avoid payment of any charge applicable to the reception of the programme.' In 2012, the European Court ruled that blocking foreign satellite TV breached EU single market rules. The English high court quashed Mrs Murphy's convictions.

=== Worldwide coverage ===
Promoted as "The Greatest Show on Earth", the Premier League is the most-watched football league in the world, broadcast in 212 territories to 643 million homes and a potential TV audience of 4.7 billion people;. The Premier League's production arm, Premier League Productions, is operated by IMG Productions and is responsible for producing all content for its international television partners.

==== United States ====
In the United States, coverage for most of the 2000s and early 2010s was shared between Fox Soccer/Fox Soccer Plus and ESPN, with Fox Deportes and ESPN Deportes holding Spanish language rights. NBC Sports (primarily through NBCSN, NBC, CNBC, and USA Network) replaced ESPN and Fox Soccer as the exclusive broadcaster of the league in the US (in both English and Spanish; Telemundo and NBC Universo now carry Spanish-language coverage) beginning in the 2013–14 season, as the result of a new three-year, $250 million USD deal with the league, including 20 matches that start at 5:30pm UK time on Saturdays free-to-air on the main NBC network (12:30pm American Eastern). Other games are carried through gametime-only channels known as "Premier League Extra Time", and all games are carried through NBC Sports' website and the NBC Sports mobile app with TV Everywhere authentication, with USA Network carrying matches in lieu of NBCSN during the 2014 Winter Olympics and 2016 Summer Olympics. Beginning with the 2017–18 season, all matches not shown on the linear TV channels will be available on Premier League Pass, a subscription service hosted by NBC Sports Gold. Survival Sunday coverage (under the banner Championship Sunday) will be carried on the last match day by ten NBCUniversal networks, along with Telemundo and mun2. ESPN properties air the FA Cup from 2018/19 season through subscription service hosted by ESPN+.

On 10 August 2015 NBC Sports announced it had reached a six-year extension with the Premier League to broadcast the football league through the 2021–22 season. The value of the licensing deal rose by 100% with the deal estimated to be worth $1 billion (£640 million); double the previous value. Traditionally a three-year deal, NBC Sports were able to double that length, as Premier League viewership on NBC and NBCSN averaged a record 479,000 viewers in the 2014–15 season — up 9% from the record NBC Sports set during its debut covering the Premier League in 2013–14 (438,000 viewers), and up 118% from 2012–13, when coverage still aired on Fox Soccer and ESPN/ESPN2 (220,000 viewers). Along with improved ratings, NBC Sports has been widely praised for its coverage of the Premier League, while Fox Sports and ESPN have been criticized for neglecting coverage, in favour of other major U.S. sports they also cover.

==== Asia ====
The Premier League is particularly popular in Asia, where it is the most widely distributed sports programme. In India, the matches are broadcast live on Star Sports. Premier League broadcasts began in India in August 1996. Liverpool's 2–0 victory over Arsenal was the first Monday night game broadcast. In China, data from 2003 suggested that matches were attracting television audiences between 100 million and 360 million, more than any other foreign sport. In 2012, Chinese rights were awarded to Super Sports in a six-year agreement that began in the 2013/14 season. Due to its popularity in Asia, the league has held four pre-season tournaments there, the only Premier League affiliated tournaments ever to have been held outside England. The Premier League Asia Trophy has been played in Malaysia, Thailand, Hong Kong and China and involves three Premier League clubs playing against a prominent team from the host nation, often the national side.

==== Other ====
In Canada, Sportsnet owned the Premier League rights for three years from the 2010–11 season. Select games (particularly those aired by ESPN) were sub-licensed to TSN. Starting in the 2013–14 season until 2018–19 season, the matches are divided between Sportsnet and TSN: some of TSN's broadcasts utilize the NBC Sports feed rather than the primary world feed. Sportsnet holds rights to the FA Cup, although all but the finals are televised on its subscription service Sportsnet World. However, from 2019 to 2020 season, DAZN announced that it had acquired Canadian rights to the Premier League, replacing Sportsnet and TSN, under a three-year deal.

In Australia, Optus broadcasts all of the season's 380 matches live, on-demand replays and highlights, through monthly subscription. As of 2019/2020 season there will no longer be a FTA broadcaster.

Figures from UK tourism body VisitBritain suggest that 750,000 visitors to Britain attended a Premier League match in 2010, spending a total £595 million and an average of £766. Visitors from Norway, where the first live football match from England was aired in 1969, are most likely to come to watch Premier League football, with one in 13 Norwegian tourists travelling specifically to attend matches. Second on the list is the United Arab Emirates. For those visiting family and friends, the most likely to watch a football match are from Japan, China and Australia.

== Kick-off times ==
=== Premier League ===
Each weekend as many as six Premier League matches will be moved to be shown on Sky Sports or TNT Sports. The main kick-off times for TV matches are 12:30 p.m. and 5:30 p.m. on Saturdays, 2 p.m. and 4:30 p.m. on Sundays, and 8 p.m. on Mondays. For up to 10 matches each season, there is also a Friday night 8 p.m. TV slot. Other matches may also be moved to Sunday, usually because one of the teams involved played in a UEFA Europa League fixture the preceding Thursday. This can sometimes result in midday, 2p.m., and 4:30 p.m. Sunday kick-offs, with the 12:00 game sometimes being broadcast on TNT Sports. The 2:15 p.m. game will sometimes kick off at 2 pm.

Sky Sports will almost always show a Saturday 5:30 p.m. as well as a Sunday 4:30 p.m. game live, typically following a Sunday 2 p.m. or 2:15 p.m. kick off as part of a Super Sunday double-bill. Two matches per midweek round will also be picked for live broadcast by TNT Sports on Tuesday and Wednesday evenings at either 7:30 p.m. or 8:15 pm. The only two exceptional cases are the opening midweek round and Boxing Day where all 10 games from each round are shown by Amazon Prime Video.

TNT Sports broadcasts live Premier League games at 12:30 p.m. on Saturdays.

Each broadcaster is subjected to restrictions on the number of times they can show each team live per season to ensure fair distribution of TV revenue. Similarly, each team must appear at least once in each TV slot.

During the COVID-19 pandemic all Premier League fixtures were being broadcast. Kick off times at the weekends included Fridays 6pm & 8pm, Saturday 12:30pm, 3pm, 5:30pm & 8pm, Sunday 12pm, 2pm, 4:30pm & 7:15pm, and Mondays 6pm & 8pm. Not all times slots were always used and sometimes games were broadcast simultaneously. Additionally some games were scheduled on Tuesdays, Wednesdays, & Thursdays, with kick off at either 6pm or 8:15pm. Saturday 12:30pm games are broadcast on TNT Sports. Saturday 5:30pm, Sunday 2pm and 4:30pm, & Monday 8pm games were broadcast on Sky Sports. Other games were broadcast by either Sky Sports, TNT Sports, Amazon Prime or BBC Sport.

=== English Football League ===
All televised EFL games are broadcast on Sky Sports, with two games (usually Championship) per weekend broadcast at 20:00 on a Friday and 12:30 on a Saturday. Other games may be additionally scheduled at different times, such as 17:30 on Saturday, 12:00 on Sunday or, very occasionally, 20:00 on a Monday.

=== 3pm "blackout" ===
In the 1960s, Burnley chairman Bob Lord successfully convinced fellow Football League chairmen that televised matches on a Saturday afternoon would have a negative effect on the attendances of other Football League games that were not being televised and as a result reduce their financial income.

As a result, the FA, Premier League and Football League do not permit English matches to be televised live between 14:45 and 17:15 on a Saturday within the United Kingdom. Until recently, the FA Cup Final was an exception to this rule and was broadcast at 15:00 on a Saturday in May; however, the 2012 FA Cup Final was moved to 17:15.

Foreign matches shown in the United Kingdom are also affected by the blackout; Eleven Sports do not broadcast the first fifteen minutes of Italian Serie A matches which kick off at 17:00 UK time.

In February 2011, Advocate General Kokott of the European Court of Justice opined that the "closed periods" did not encourage match attendance at other league games.

It is, in fact, doubtful whether closed periods are capable of encouraging attendance at matches and participation in matches. Both activities have a completely different quality to the following of a live transmission on television. It has not been adequately shown to the Court that the closed periods actually encourage attendance at and participation in matches. Indeed, there is evidence to refute this claim: for example, in an investigation of the closed periods under competition law the Commission found that only 10 of 22 associations had actually adopted a closed period. No closed periods were adopted in France, Germany, Italy and Spain, or in Northern Ireland, that is to say, within the sphere of influence of English football.

— Advocate General Kokott of the European Court of Justice

To avoid this blackout, the last day of the Premier League, when all ten games must kick off simultaneously, is always played on a Sunday. The final rounds of fixtures in the Football League are also played away from 15:00 on a Saturday in order to broadcast live games.

Live radio broadcasts are permitted, both nationally and locally; these may be simulcast on the internet, depending on the broadcaster. Viewers outside the UK can still watch these games live on foreign broadcasters, thus creating somewhat of a grey market within the UK with viewers able to subscribe to or watch streams of foreign channels.

The Premier League and Sky maintain that, while grey market viewing of games is not illegal on the part of the viewer, it is illegal for anyone (such as a public house) to make such services openly available. This has in the past led to heavy fines for public houses in the United Kingdom which have shown 3pm games in their establishments. More recently, the legality of such fines has been disputed, and a number of Crown Court cases have been reported in which publicans successfully challenged the Premier League's position.

In recent years, Sky Sports have shown a 3pm game in full, on tape delay via their Game of the Day show, with extended highlights of the other 3pm games shown after, on Match Choice.

The 3pm blackout was suspended when the 2019–20 season restarted because of the COVID-19 pandemic, when fans were not able to attend matches due to lockdown restrictions. As a result, the following 2020–21 season represented the first time that all 380 matches in a Premier League season were broadcast live in the UK. On 20 June 2020, Brighton & Hove Albion and Arsenal played the first Saturday 3pm Premier League game to be shown live on television in the UK, as part of "Project Restart" during the pandemic. The blackout was reintroduced and fully observed for the 2021–22 season.

When Cristiano Ronaldo returned to Manchester United on deadline day of the summer 2021 transfer window, many demanded an exception to the 3pm blackout, or otherwise its outright abolition, as his second debut was to take place at a 3pm match against Newcastle United at Old Trafford on 11 September 2021. Others instead continued to support the black out due to its effects in protecting lower league football.

On Saturday 6 May 2023, Sky Sports were permitted to circumvent the blackout for their broadcast of Manchester City vs Leeds United live at 15:00. The fixture was initially planned for Sunday 7 May at 14:00 but was brought forward a day due to City's UEFA Champions League commitments the following Tuesday and played at 15:00 to avoid clashing with the coronation of Charles III earlier in the day, and no later due to policing constraints. The lack of lower-league fixtures at that time also allowed the game to be televised.

Between 2023 and 2026, English football television coverage is undergoing a massive expansion, dominated by a record-breaking £6.7 billion Premier League deal (2025–2029). Sky Sports remains the primary broadcaster, showing 80% of matches (at least 215 per season) from 2025, including all final-day matches, while TNT Sports shows 52 matches. [1, 2, 3]

== See also ==
- Timeline of football on UK television
