= Elton Welsby =

English television sports presenter

Elton Welsby is a television presenter. He presented the British gameshow Busman's Holiday, following on from Julian Pettifer and Sarah Kennedy.
