= The Goal Rush (TV series) =

2001 British television sports programme

- Presented by: Angus Scott
- Country of origin: United Kingdom
- Original language: English

Production
- Running time: 35-120 minutes

Original release
- Network: ITV; ITV2; ITV Sport Channel
- Release: 18 August 2001 – 20 December 2003

The Goal Rush is a live ITV television programme that aired from 18 August 2001 to 20 December 2003, produced by Granada Television. The programme was broadcast on Saturdays as a rival show to Final Score on BBC One, and provided live football scores from the Premier League and The Football League. Coverage began on ITV2 and then continued on ITV1. The programme was presented by Angus Scott.

ITV ran the programme across two and a half of the three seasons that it held the rights to show Premiership highlights. After the rights were lost, The Goal Rush was axed, and the final edition was aired on 20 December 2003.

== History ==
The Goal Rush was announced in 2000 by Brian Barwick, ITV Controller of Sport. The programme was a replacement for Football First which had aired exclusively on ITV2 since its launch in December 1998. It first aired on 18 August 2001 after ITV won the rights to Premier League highlights.

== Format ==
The format was similar to that which is used by the BBC's Final Score and Sky's Soccer Saturday; with live match reports, on screen scores and a ticker. The programme consisted of various data sets and tickers being on-screen simultaneously with the studio shot occupying a small part of the screen, and the programme was described as "having the style and feel of the Bloomberg Television channel".

Each episode started at 14:30 on Saturdays on ITV's digital channel, ITV2. At varying times after 16:00 the coverage would switch to ITV1. The service was hosted by presenter Angus Scott, and former footballer and football manager Ron Atkinson provided expert analysis. Other analysts included Clive Allen, Paul Elliott, Jim Beglin and John Barnes.

== Reception ==
The look of the service resembled the BBC's service quite closely and commentators criticised ITV for this. The programme never achieved a high number of viewers and on 6 April 2002 the show received ITV's lowest ever audience share of 3%, during the broadcast of the 2002 Grand National on BBC One.
