= List of British football commentators =

This is a list of media commentators and writers in the United Kingdom on the sport of association football.

A number of football players have had a second career as writers or commentators. However, many commentators never played the game at a professional level, yet they have gone on to become famous names associated with the game.

== Table ==
Name	Playing career	Broadcaster/Publication
Scott Booth	Aberdeen (1988–1997); Borussia Dortmund (1997–1999); FC Utrecht (1998); Vitesse Arnhem (1999); FC Twente (1999–2003); Aberdeen (2003–2004); Scotland (1993–2001)	Setanta Sports
Steve Bower	None	BBC Sport (2009–present); Setanta Sports (2006–2009); MUTV (1998–2007); ESPN (2009–2013); ITV Sport (2009-2013); TNT Sports (2013–present); NBC Sports (2016–present)
Peter Brackley	None	BBC (1972–1982, 2009–2011); ITV Sport (1982–1988, 1992–2010); British Eurosport/Sky Television (1988–1992); Channel 4 (1992–2002)
Trevor Brooking	West Ham United (1966–1984); England (1974–1982)	BBC Radio (1984–2003, 2016, 2018); BBC Television (1984–2003)
Simon Brotherton	None	BBC Radio 5 Live (1992–2015); BBC Television (1999–present); TNT Sports(2013–present)
Alistair Bruce-Ball	None	BBC Radio 5 Live (2004-present)
Jock Brown	None	BBC Scotland; Setanta Sports
Craig Burley	Chelsea (1989–1997); Celtic (1997–1999); Derby County (1999–2003); Dundee (2003); Preston North End (2004); Walsall (2004); Scotland (1995–2003)	Setanta Sports; ESPN (2009–2013); ITV (2010–2012); ESPN FC (2013–present)
Bryon Butler	None	The Daily Telegraph (1961–1968, 1991–2001); BBC Radio (1968–1991)
Jamie Carragher	Liverpool (1997-2013)	Sky Sports (2013-present); CBS Sports (2020-present)
Jon Champion	None	BBC Radio (1990–1995); BBC Television (1995–2001, 2013–2015); ITV (2001–2008, 2010, 2012, 2013–present); Setanta Sports (2007–2009); ESPN (2009–present); BT Sport (2015–2019); Premier League Productions (2004-2019, 2023-present); Amazon Prime Video (2019-present); NBC (2023–present)
David Coleman	None	BBC Television (1958–1984)
Robyn Cowen	None	BBC Sport (2017–present); Sky Sports (2023-present)
Paddy Crerand	Celtic (1956–1963); Manchester United (1963–1971)	MUTV (2000–present)
Ian Crocker	None	Sky Sports; Setanta Sports (2006–2009); ITV (2010)
Ian Darke	None	Sky Sports (1992–2010); ESPN (2010–present); TNT Sports(2013–present)
Barry Davies	None	BBC Radio (1963–1966); ITV (1966–1969); BBC Television (1969–2004, 2014); Absolute Radio (2015)
Paul Dempsey	None	Sky Sports (1989–2007); Setanta Sports (2007–2009); ESPN (UK) (2009–2013); TNT Sports (2013–present)
Ian Dennis	None	BBC Radio Leeds (1998-2002); BBC Radio 5 Live (2002-present)
Peter Drury	None	BBC Radio (1993–1997); ITV (1997–2013); Premier League Productions (2004-2022); ESPN (2012–2013); BT Sport (2013–2022); NBC (2022-present); Sky Sports (2023-present)
John Dykes	None	Fox Sports (Asia)
Robbie Earle	Port Vale (1982–1991); Wimbledon (1991–2000)	ITV (2001–2010); NBC (2013–present)
Darren Fletcher	none	BBC Radio Five Live (2004–present); TNT Sports (2013–present)
Toby Gilles	None	talkSPORT International (2013–present); Radio City 96.7 (2007–2011) Manchester City (2010–2011)
Richard Gordon	None	Sportsound
Andy Gray	Dundee United (1973–1975); Aston Villa (1975–1978); Wolves (1978–1983); Everton (1983–1988); West Bromwich Albion (1987-1988); Rangers(1988–1989); Cheltenham Town (1989–1990); Scotland (1975–1985)	Sky Sports (1990–2011) beIN Sports (2012–present); Talksport (2011–2013); BT Sport (2014)
Alan Green	None	BBC Radio (1981–2020); BBC Sport (2013–2016)
Stuart Hall	None	BBC Radio (1959–2012)
Alan Hansen	Partick Thistle (1973–1977); Liverpool (1977–1991); Scotland (1979–1986)	Sky Sports (1991–1992); BBC Sport (1992–2014)
Rob Hawthorne	None	BBC Radio (1990-1995); Sky Sports (1995–present)
John Helm	None	BBC Radio (1970–1981); ITV (1981–2001); Channel 5 (1999–2007)
Jimmy Hill	Brentford (1949–1953); Fulham (1953–1961)	ITV (1968–1972); BBC Sport (1972–1998); Sky Sports (1999–2007)
Mike Ingham	None	BBC Radio (1977–2014)
Hugh Johns	None	ITV (1966–2001)
Peter Jones	None	BBC Radio (1964–1990)
Tony Jones	None	Channel 4 (2004–2006) (Occasionally); ITV (2005–2009) (Occasionally); Five (2005–2007) (Occasionally); Sky Sports (2004–2025)
Richard Keys	None	Sky Sports (1990–2011) beIN Sports (2012–present); Talksport (2011–2013)
Gary Lineker	Leicester City (1978–1985); Everton (1985–1986); Barcelona (1986–1989); Tottenham Hotspur (1989–1992); Nagoya Grampus Eight (1992–1994); England (1985–1992)	BBC Television (1992–2025); BT Sport (2015–2021)
Rebecca Lowe	None	Setanta Sports (2007–2009); ESPN (2009–2013); NBC (2013–present)
Des Lynam	None	BBC Television (1968–1999); ITV (1999–2005)
Gerry McNee	None	Scottish Television
Archie Macpherson	None	Scottish Television; Talksport; Eurosport; Radio Clyde
Alistair Mann	none	BBC Television (2006–present); BT Sport (2013–2023); Manchester City
Paul Mitchell	None	Sportsound (2005–present)
Arthur Montford	None	Scottish Television
Brian Moore	None	The Times (1958–1961); BBC Radio (1961–1968); ITV (1968–1998); Talksport (1998–2001)
Tyler Morris	None	Livescore (2022–present); Flashscore (2021-2022); GBvision (2021-Present)
John Motson	None	BBC Radio (1968–1971), (2001–2018); BBC Sport (1971–2018) (semi-retired in 2008); Talksport (2018–2019)
Guy Mowbray	None	Eurosport (1997–1999); ITV (1999–2004); BBC Sport (2004–present); TNT Sports(2015-present)
John Murray	None	BBC Radio 5 Live (1997-present)
Gary Neville	Manchester United (1992–2011)	ITV Sport (2002 & 2008, 2018–present); Sky Sports (2011–2015, 2016–present)
Dan O'Hagan	None	MUTV (1999–2001); Eurosport (2003–present); ITV (2001–2005); BBC Sport (2004–2015)
Jacqui Oatley	None	BBC Sport (2009–2019); ITV Sport (2018–2022); Sky Sports (2020–present); CBS Sports (2023-present)
Michael Owen	Liverpool (1996–2004); Real Madrid (2004–2005); Newcastle United (2005–2009); Manchester United (2009–2012); Stoke City (2012–2013)	TNT Sports (2013–present); Premier League Productions (2013-present)
Alan Parry	None	BBC Radio (1973–1985); ITV (1985–1996); Sky Sports (1997–present); Talksport (1998–2002, 2010, 2014, 2016, 2018)
Jonathan Pearce	None	Channel 5 (1997–2004); BBC Radio 5 Live (2002–2005, 2013–present); BBC Sport (2004–present); TNT Sports (2013–present)
Jim Proudfoot	None	Talksport (1999-2010, 2014-present); Sky Sports (2004-2006); Setanta Sports (2006–2009); Premier League Productions (2006-present); ESPN (UK) (2009–2013); Absolute Radio (2010-2014)
Derek Rae	None	ESPN (USA) (2002–present); ESPN (UK) (2009–2013); BT Sport (2013–2017); NBC Sports (2017–present); Fox Sports (2018–present)
Dave Roberts	Professional Game Referee	TFM Radio (1986–1995); Century Radio (1995–1997); Talk Radio (1997–1998); Sky Sports (1998–2005); ESPN (2005–present)
Jim Rosenthal	None	ITV (1980–2010); Channel 5 (2009–2012); Talksport; Amazon Prime Video (2019-2024)
Robbie Savage	Manchester United (1993–1994); Crewe Alexandra (1994–1997); Leicester City (1997–2002); Birmingham City (2002–2005); Blackburn Rovers (2005–2008); Derby County (2008–2011); Brighton & Hove Albion (2008); Wales (1995–2004)	ESPN (2009–2013); BBC Radio 5 Live (2009–present); BBC Sport (2010–2015); TNT Sports (2013–present)
Angus Scott	None	ITV Sport (1998–2006, 2010); Setanta Sports (2007–2009) beIN Sports (2009–2020; Amazon Prime Video (2020-2024); BT Sport (2020–2023)
Vicki Sparks	None	BBC Radio 5 Live
Joe Speight	None	Setanta Sports (2007–2009); ESPN (2009–2013); ITV Sport (2011–present); Sky Sports (2009–present); BT Sport (2014-2023)
Gary Taphouse	None	Sky Sports (2005–present); Talksport (2014–2018)
Clive Tyldesley	None	ITV (1987–1992, 1996–2024); BBC Sport (1992–1996)
Martin Tyler	None	ITV (1976–1990); Screensport/Sky Channel/Super Channel (1980s); Sky Sports/SBS (1990–2023); ESPN/Fox Soccer (2010–2013)
Arlo White	None	BBC Radio (2001–2010); NBC (2013–2022)
Bob Wilson	Arsenal (1963–1974)	BBC Television (1974–1994); ITV (1994–2002)
Kenneth Wolstenholme	None	BBC Radio (1946–1948); BBC Sport (1948–1971); ITV (1974–1979)
