= 5 Live Sport =

BBC Radio 5 programme, formerly Sport on 5

5 Live Sport is the banner of live sports coverage on BBC Radio 5 Live. The regular presenters are Mark Chapman (Monday, Wednesday and Saturday), Kelly Cates (Tuesday), Steve Crossman (Thursday and Sunday) and Darren Fletcher (Friday). The programme is on air from Monday to Wednesday 7pm to 10:30pm, Thursday and Friday 7pm to 10pm and at the weekend from 12pm until the early evening, depending on the events being covered.

== History ==
5 Live Sport evolved from the Saturday afternoon radio sports programme Sport on 2, which started on BBC Radio 2 on 4 April 1970. The programme was also broadcast on most bank holiday afternoons. Afternoon-long sporting coverage on Sundays, using different names during the Radio 2 era, was introduced in 1984 although this was confined to the summer months and it took on a format mixing sport and music. Sport on 2 became Sport on 5 on 1 September 1990 following the transfer of BBC Radio's sports coverage to the newly launched BBC Radio 5. The programme continued to be called Sport on 5 following the replacement of BBC Radio 5 with BBC Radio 5 Live in March 1994. The 5 Live Sport name has been used since 2006.

== Format ==
=== Original format ===
The original format featured the major sports events each Saturday afternoon, broadcasting between 1:30 pm and 5 pm, with updates from the major footballing fixtures and second half commentary on a top match. The location of the commentary game would usually be revealed around 3 pm. Sports Report then followed at 5 pm. During the summer, Sports Report was not broadcast, meaning that Sport on 2 ran from 1:30 pm and 6 pm, extended to 7 pm during the Wimbledon fortnight.

=== Current format ===
The main focus of the programme, especially between August and May, is still on the football season, and in particular the Premier League. 5 Live Sport has live Premier League commentaries on Saturdays at 3 pm and 5:30 pm, as well as on Sundays at 2 pm and 4:30 pm. They also have live commentaries from the Champions League and FA Cup. The programme also has extensive coverage of the England national team. Mark Chapman is the main presenter. Other major events such as the Formula One, Six Nations and The Ashes are also aired. In the summer, major sporting events such as the Olympics, the Commonwealth Games, Wimbledon and the Open are all given extensive coverage.

=== Presenters ===
- Eilidh Barbour
- John Bennett
- Kelly Cates
- Mark Chapman
- Steve Crossman
- Maz Farookhi
- Darren Fletcher
- Sonja McLaughlan
- Eleanor Oldroyd
- Aaron Paul
- Gigi Salmon
- Katie Smith
- Kelly Somers

==== Notable former presenters ====
- Bryon Butler
- Jon Champion
- Mike Ingham
- John Inverdale
- Renton Laidlaw
- Des Lynam
- Colin Murray
- Ian Payne
- Jonathan Pearce
- Mark Pougatch
- Mark Saggers
- Dan Walker
- Arlo White

=== Correspondents ===
- Cricket – Jonathan Agnew
- Football – John Murray
- Golf – Iain Carter
- Rugby Union – Chris Jones
- Tennis – Russell Fuller

=== Reporters ===
- Cricket – Adam Mountford, Eleanor Oldroyd, Nikesh Rughani
- Football – Nathan Albon, John Acres, Eilidh Barbour, John Bennett, Lee Blakeman, Chris Coles, Kenny Crawford, George Cummins, Maz Farookhi, Gary Flintoff, Tom Gayle, Andy Gillies, Betty Glover, Emily Herbert, Becky Ives, Jane Lewis, Emily Kilner, Nesta McGregor, Connie Mclaughlin, Mike Minay, Henry Moeran, Rob Nothman, Aaron Paul, Will Perry, Charlotte Richardson, Flo Pollock, Naz Premji, Sanny Rudravajhala, Nikesh Rughani, Sohail Sahi, Shourjo Sarker, Mark Scott, Andy Sixsmith, Charlie Slater, Katie Smith, John Southall, Chris Wise, Rich Wolfenden, Alistair Yeomans
- Formula One – Jennie Gow, Rosanna Tennant
- Rugby League – Ian Chisnall, Chris Cooper, Matt Newsum, Sharon Shortle, Richard Stead

=== Commentators ===
- Athletics – Alistair Bruce-Ball, Katharine Merry, Ed Harry
- Boxing - Ronald McIntosh
- Cricket – Jonathan Agnew, Isa Guha, Kevin Howells, Alison Mitchell, Henry Moeran, Nikesh Rughani, Daniel Norcross, Melissa Story.
- Football – Eilidh Barbour, Lee Blakeman, Alistair Bruce-Ball, Chris Coles, Ian Dennis, Tom Gayle, Conor McNamara, Mike Minay, John Murray, Jonathan Pearce, Flo Pollock, Mark Scott, Vicki Sparks, Chris Wise
- Formula One – Harry Benjamin, Ben Edwards (relief)
- Golf – Eilidh Barbour, Alistair Bruce-Ball, Iain Carter, Katherine Downes, James Gregg, Chris Jones, John Murray
- Racing – John Hunt, Darren Owen
- Rugby League – Matt Newsum, Stuart Pyke, Sharon Shortle
- Rugby Union – James Burridge, Iain Carter, Andrew Cotter, Chris Jones, Gareth Lewis, Conor McNamara, Sara Orchard, Claire Thomas
- Tennis – Iain Carter, Naomi Cavaday, Russell Fuller, Abigail Johnson, David Law, Sara Orchard, Jonathan Overend, Gigi Salmon, Katie Smith, Claire Thomas

==== Notable former commentators ====
- Athletics – Mike Costello
- Football – Ian Brown, Simon Brotherton, Bryon Butler, Jon Champion, Peter Drury, Roddy Forsyth, Alan Green, Seb Hutchinson, Rob Hawthorne, Mike Ingham, Peter Jones, Pien Meulensteen, John Motson, Pat Murphy, Jacqui Oatley, David Oates, Mike Sewell, Arlo White, Steve Wilson, Dave Woods
- Formula One – David Croft, Maurice Hamilton, Jack Nicholls
- Golf – Conor McNamara
- Rugby League – David Oates, Dave Woods
- Rugby Union – Alastair Eykyn, Alastair Hignell, Nick Mullins, Ian Robertson

=== Pundits ===
- Athletics – Allison Curbishley
- Boxing – Steve Bunce
- Cricket – James Anderson, Steven Finn, Alex Hartley, Ebony Rainford-Brent, Alec Stewart, Phil Tufnell, Michael Vaughan
- Cycling – Rob Hayles
- Football – Karen Bardsley, Michael Brown, Izzy Christiansen, Conor Coady, Rachel Corsie, Dion Dublin, Robert Green, Phil Jagielka, Neil Lennon, James McFadden, Clinton Morrison, Nedum Onuoha, Leon Osman, Pat Nevin, Micah Richards, Paul Robinson, Andy Reid, Robbie Savage, Mark Schwarzer, Alan Shearer, Steve Sidwell, Chris Sutton, Matthew Upson, Chris Waddle, Stephen Warnock, Theo Walcott, Ellen White
- Formula One – Jolyon Palmer, Alice Powell, Sam Bird, Marc Priestley, Damon Hill
- Rugby Union – Chris Ashton, Tommy Bowe, Danny Care, Matt Dawson, Paul Grayson, Denis Hickie, Andrew Mehrtens, Katherine Merchant, Ugo Monye, Bob Skinstad
- Tennis – Marion Bartoli, Naomi Broady, Pat Cash, Kim Clijsters, Annabel Croft, John McEnroe, Laura Robson, Greg Rusedski, Jeff Tarango, Mark Woodforde

== Podcasts ==
- 606
- Boxing with Costello and Bunce
- Chequered Flag Formula One
- Fighting Talk
- Football Daily
- 72+ EFL Podcast
- Rugby League
- Rugby Union Weekly
- Sport Specials
- Tailenders
- Test Match Special
- That Peter Crouch Podcast
- The Doosra
- The Squad

== See also ==
- Sports Report
