= Sport on Four =

Sport on Four was a long-running BBC radio sports programme aired on BBC Radio 4 on Saturday mornings between 30 April 1977 and 4 April 1998. Its original presenter was former Welsh cricketer Tony Lewis. In the early years the programme ran from 0810 until 0845, but was moved to the 0905-0930 slot at the start of 1987 as a consequence of the launch of a Saturday edition of The Today programme.

In 1986 a series of guest presenters led Sport on 4, including Chris Rea, Harry Carpenter, David Coleman, Ian Wooldridge, Chris Brasher, Ron Pickering, Barry Davies, Des Lynam and others. Eventually, Cliff Morgan - who had just retired as a senior BBC TV Executive - took over the presenter's role in the spring of 1987 and remained at the helm until the programme came to an end with the April 1998 schedule changes.

After the launch of BBC Radio 5 in 1990, Sport on 4 was given a lunchtime repeat on the new network, using the title of Sport On 4 + 1. This repeat was dropped in 1994 when BBC Radio 5 Live was launched.

Other BBC sports reporters and correspondents who contributed to the programme included Tony Adamson, Christopher Martin-Jenkins, Garry Richardson, Ian Robertson, Renton Laidlaw, Peter Bromley, Peter Jones, Bryon Butler, John Inverdale and others. Its theme tune used an extract from The Shuffle by Van McCoy. Sport on Four was replaced in the new Radio 4 schedule by John Peel's Home Truths from 11 April 1998.
