= Ron Jones (commentator) =

Welsh sports commentator

Ron Jones is a Welsh sports commentator.

== Broadcasting career ==
Jones began working for the BBC in 1979. His broadcasting career began when he was asked to work on local programmes while living and working as a sports coach in Jamaica .

When he returned to the UK, Ron lectured at the University of Wales before moving to London in 1984 to focus on sports commentating, primarily football. He covered football on BBC Radio Wales for a number of years and even did a few television commentaries for BBC Wales. His main career progression came when he moved to BBC Radio 2 (which covered sport before BBC Radio 5 Live was set up), where he could be heard nationally working alongside fellow Welshman Peter Jones as well as Bryon Butler and Alan Green.

An all rounder, he has covered football, hockey, rugby union, golf and athletics, and gave some memorable broadcasts at the 1988 Summer Olympics in Seoul.

Ron has worked on five World Cup tournaments and covered English Premier League matches for Irish radio station Today FM until his retirement in May 2018.

== Personal life ==
Jones still lives in Wales with his family.
