= Ian Dennis =

Ian Dennis may refer to:

- Ian Dennis (artist), British artist and Internet celebrity
- Ian Dennis (football commentator) (born 1971), British football commentator
- Ian Dennis (academic lawyer), professor of English law
