= 1994 European Super Cup =

Arsenal	Milan
(England)	(Italy)
0	2
- on aggregate

First leg
Arsenal	Milan
0	0
- Date: 1 February 1995
- Venue: Highbury, London
- Referee: Mario van der Ende (Netherlands)
- Attendance: 38,044

Second leg
Milan	Arsenal
2	0
- Date: 8 February 1995
- Venue: San Siro, Milan
- Referee: Hellmut Krug (Germany)
- Attendance: 23,953

The 1994 European Super Cup was a football match played over two legs between Arsenal of England and Milan of Italy. It was the 20th staging of the European Super Cup, a fixture between the winners of the UEFA Champions League and European Cup Winners' Cup. The first leg was played at Highbury, London on 1 February 1995 and at the San Siro, Milan a week later for the second leg. Milan won the Super Cup 2–0 on aggregate, securing his third trophy overall. The competition would be renamed the UEFA Super Cup the following season.

The teams qualified for the competition by separately winning the 1993–94 UEFA Champions League and 1993–94 European Cup Winners' Cup. Milan won the former, beating Barcelona 4–0 in the final. Arsenal qualified as winners of the Cup Winners' Cup; in the final of the competition they defeated Parma by a single goal. This was the first official meeting between both clubs in European football.

Milan's preparations for the Super Cup were blighted by the death of Vincenzo Spagnolo, a Genoa supporter who was stabbed on his way to watch the two teams play. Once news of his death had arrived, the match was abandoned and the Italian football calendar was suspended for a week. Milan and Arsenal paid respect to Spagnolo by observing a minute's silence before the first leg. A crowd of 38,044 witnessed both clubs play out a goalless draw at Highbury; the first leg marked the return of Paul Merson, who spent time away from football in order to seek treatment for various addictions. A significantly lower crowd at the San Siro saw Milan dominate in large periods and win courtesy of goals from Zvonomir Boban and Daniele Massaro.

== Background ==
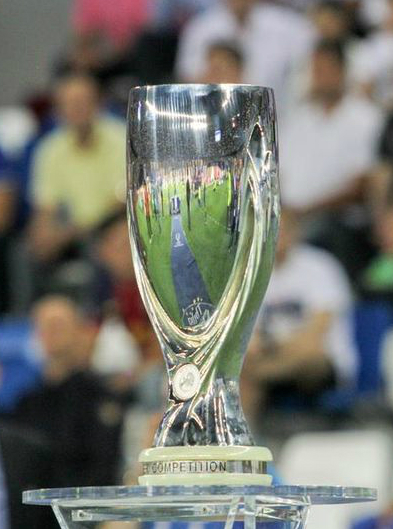
The Super Cup trophy

The European Super Cup was founded in the early 1970s, as a means to determine the best team in Europe and serve as a challenge to Ajax, the strongest club side of its day. The proposal by Dutch journalist Anton Witkamp, a football match between the holders of the European Cup and Cup Winners' Cup, failed to receive UEFA's backing, given the recent Cup Winners' Cup winners Rangers had been banned from European competition. (Note: In 1972, Rangers was banned from European competition for two years after fans clashed with Spanish police while celebrating the club's victory over Dynamo Moscow in the European Cup Winners' Cup Final. The ban was later reduced to one year on appeal.) Witkamp nonetheless proceeded with his vision, a two-legged match played between Ajax and Rangers in January 1973. The competition was endorsed and recognised by UEFA a year later.

Arsenal qualified for the Super Cup as the reigning European Cup Winners' Cup winners. It marked their debut in the event. Arsenal had conceded only three goals throughout the 1993–94 staging of the Cup Winners' Cup, and beat Italian side Parma by a single goal to win the final. The other Super Cup place went to Milan, winners of the 1993–94 UEFA Champions League. Milan defeated pre-match favourites Barcelona 4–0 in the final, a result which earned the club their third top European honour in six years. Milan were appearing in the event for the fifth time; prior to the game against Arsenal, they had won the Super Cup in consecutive years (in 1989 and 1990), and lost the trophy twice (in 1973 and 1993). This was first meeting between the two sides in competitive European football.

Neither match was televised live in the United Kingdom, though highlights were shown on Carlton (the London-based ITV company), Channel 4's Football Italia and Sky Sports. Highlights of the first leg were also shown by Central Television during Central Sports Special, taking the same Brian Moore commentary as heard on Carlton. Live radio commentary of the second leg was scheduled to be broadcast during Trevor Brooking's Football Night on BBC Radio 5 Live but was replaced by an FA Cup fourth-round replay between Wolves and Sheffield Wednesday. Ron Jones did however provide reports on both matches for Five Live.

== First leg ==
The first leg was held at Highbury on 1 February 1995. Milan's preparations were overshadowed by the violence that occurred in their last domestic fixture, against Genoa three days ago. Clashes between both sets of supporters resulted in police intervention and the use of tear gas. Vincenzo Spagnolo, a Genoa supporter, was stabbed prior to kick-off and subsequently died while receiving treatment. The match was later abandoned once word was sent to the players and staff during half-time. Milan manager Fabio Capello admitted his players were deeply affected by the incident and struggled to focus on the Super Cup final. He told reporters: "I believe that the psychological balance of each player has been damaged by Sunday's tragedy. Our team was in great condition until Sunday. But in the past few days I have had to wake up the players. So I'm not able to anticipate which kind of Milan you will see." 800 Milan supporters travelled to London, and Capello denied reports a section of them intended to cause trouble.

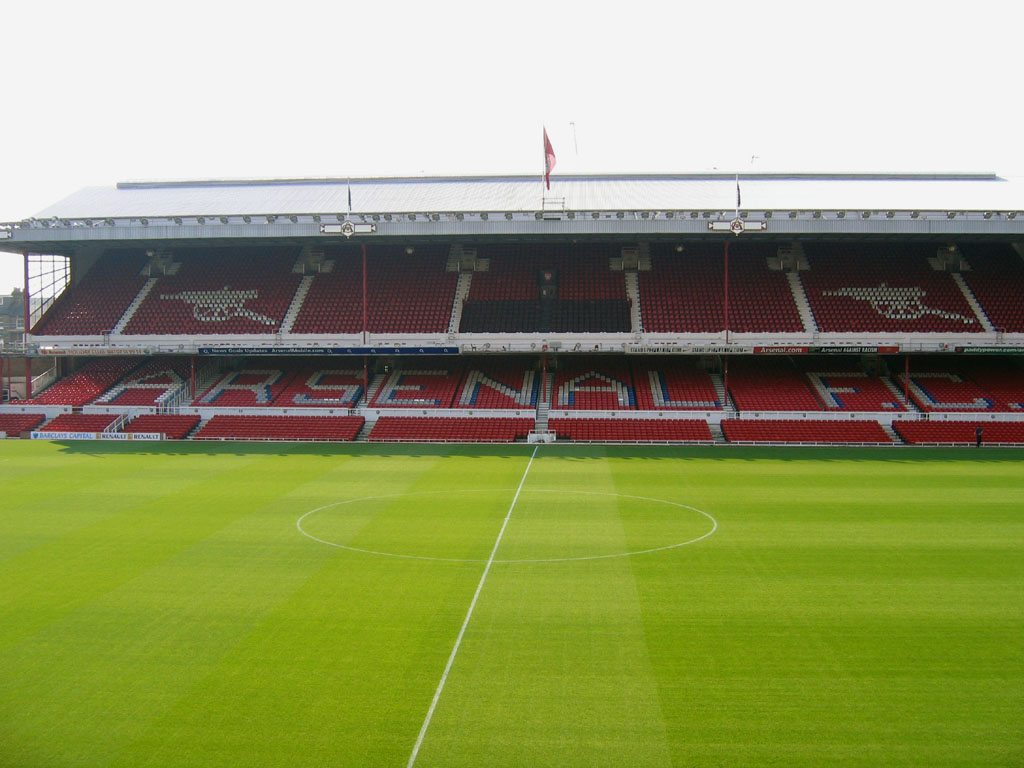
The first leg was staged at Highbury, Arsenal's home ground

Paul Merson returned to the Arsenal squad, after his much-publicised cocaine, alcohol and gambling addiction. The England international, who was admitted to a rehabilitation clinic for treatment during his absence, started on the substitutes' bench. Arsenal lined up in a 4–4–2 formation, with Ian Wright paired alongside John Hartson upfront and Kevin Campbell shifted on the right of midfield. Milan lined up in a similar formation, with Marcel Desailly and Demetrio Albertini anchoring the midfield.

A minute's silence was observed before kick-off in memory of Spagnolo; as is tradition in Italian football, the Milanese supporters clapped throughout to pay their respect. The game itself was lacklustre and was described as a "training match," lacking in "fervour and commitment" by The Times football correspondent Rob Hughes. There were few clear-cut chances created by both teams, and neither managed to score over the 90 minutes. Both however looked assured defending; Milan triggered the offside trap on several occasions, while Arsenal were boosted by club captain Tony Adams playing his first full match in two months. Manager George Graham assessed afterwards: "It was back to the Arsenal of old. We were very solid." Glenn Moore, of The Independent felt Milan would have won had they finished better, noting Dejan Savićević's tame volley in the 75th minute. Marco Simone twice hit the ball wide, while a free-kick from Albertini forced Arsenal goalkeeper David Seaman to action. The home side's best chance came from Wright in the 36th minute. He picked up the ball from Arsenal's half and proceeded to run, evading the challenges of several Milan players. His shot at goal was smartly saved by Sebastiano Rossi. Further chances went to Hartson, who headed from a Stefan Schwarz corner, and Steve Bould, before Campbell broke forward and had his effort blocked by the Milan goalkeeper.

Merson's introduction in the 74th minute was cheered by the Arsenal supporters, as was his every touch of the ball. He admitted he was overwhelmed by the occasion, adding post-match: "It was a great feeling to be in action again and I thank all those who've made it easier for me. This is the first step back."

=== Details ===
1 February 1995
20:00 GMT

Arsenal (England)	0–0	(Italy) Milan
	Report

Highbury, London
Attendance: 38,044
Referee: Mario van der Ende (Netherlands)

Arsenal	Milan

GK	1	(England) David Seaman
RB	2	(England) Lee Dixon
CB	5	(England) Steve Bould
CB	6	(England) Tony Adams (c)
LB	3	(England) Nigel Winterburn
CM	4	(Sweden) Stefan Schwarz
CM	7	(Denmark) John Jensen	(substituted off) 85'
CM	10	(England) Ian Selley
CF	8	(England) Ian Wright
CF	9	(Wales) John Hartson
CF	11	(England) Kevin Campbell	(substituted off) 74'
Substitutes:
GK	16	(England) Vince Bartram
DF	12	(England) Martin Keown
MF	13	(England) David Hillier	(substituted on) 85'
MF	14	(England) Paul Merson	(substituted on) 74'
MF	15	(Republic of Ireland) Eddie McGoldrick
Manager:
(Scotland) George Graham

GK	1	(Italy) Sebastiano Rossi
RB	2	(Italy) Mauro Tassotti
CB	5	(Italy) Alessandro Costacurta
CB	6	(Italy) Franco Baresi (c)
LB	3	(Italy) Paolo Maldini
RM	10	(Federal Republic of Yugoslavia) Dejan Savićević		(substituted off) 89'
CM	4	(Italy) Demetrio Albertini
CM	8	(France) Marcel Desailly
LM	7	(Italy) Roberto Donadoni
RF	11	(Italy) Daniele Massaro
LF	9	(Italy) Marco Simone	(yellow card) 44'
Substitutes:
GK	12	(Italy) Mario Ielpo
CB	13	(Italy) Filippo Galli
CB	14	(Italy) Stefano Nava
RM	15	(Italy) Stefano Eranio
RF	16	(Italy) Paolo Di Canio		(substituted on) 89'
Manager:
(Italy) Fabio Capello

Assistant referees:
Robert Overkleeft (Netherlands)
Robertus Brekelmans (Netherlands)
Fourth official:
Jan Wegereef (Netherlands)

Match rules

- 90 minutes
- Five named substitutes
- Maximum of two substitutions

== Second leg ==
The second leg was held at the San Siro on 8 February 1995. It marked the resumption of football in Italy, as play was abandoned for a week in memory of Spagnolo. The incident at the San Siro prompted Milan to use security measures usually reserved for high-profile matches. Ugo Allevi, the club spokesman however downplayed reports security was heightened: "There won't be any special security measures for them. They will all be housed in a special sector of the stadium, segregated from the Milan fans. What we're most concerned about is how our fans behave." 15,800 tickets were sold the night before the match, 13,600 of which were purchased by Milan supporters. Allevi admitted this was a repercussion of the violence in their last home game; "People are scared to come to football at the moment."

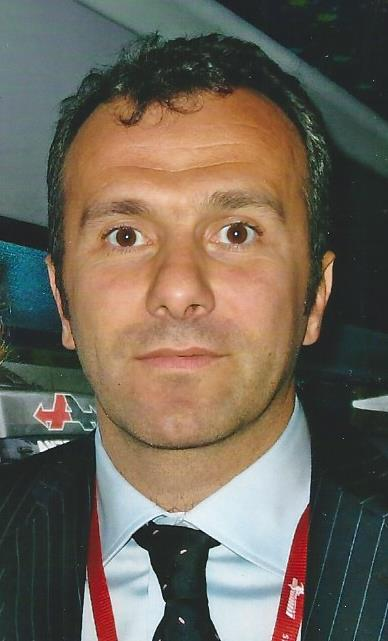
Dejan Savićević (pictured in 2007), was highly influential in Milan's win

Milan entered the match the fresher of the two teams, but Simon Barnes commented in his Times match preview that Arsenal's biggest asset was their "sheer bloody mindedness." The club's indiscipline was a major talking point before the game, as two players were sent off in defeat to Sheffield Wednesday the previous Saturday. Graham's future was also called in question, after claims that he received illegal payments from transfer deals (bungs), which he dismissed. (Note: Near the end of February 1995, Arsenal terminated Graham's contract once his financial impropriety was uncovered by a Premier League investigation. In a statement the club's board concluded that "Mr Graham did not act in the best interests of the club," and he was swiftly replaced by Stewart Houston.) In his pre-match news conference, the Arsenal manager spoke highly of European football and was eager to win another trophy for the club: "We are having a bad season by our standards and any win in any cup is worth something."

Merson came in place of John Jensen in Arsenal's starting XI, while for Milan Zvonimir Boban replaced the suspended Simone, and Christian Panucci was chosen to stand in for Paolo Maldini. Graham deployed a 4–1–4–1 formation, with Schwarz acting as the lone defensive midfielder and Hartson positioned the furthest forward. Watched by a crowd of 23,953, Milan eased to a 2–0 win and in the process ended Arsenal's 15-match unbeaten run in Europe. The home side's first goal came minutes before half-time, when Daniele Massaro's defensive-splitting pass found Boban, who scored, despite Schwarz's attempts to hold him back by tugging his shirt. The Croatian forward nearly scored a second, but for Seaman's quick intervention. Up until then, Arsenal had briefly threatened; from a long ball in the 19th minute, Hartson managed to turn Franco Baresi, but scuffed his shot wide. Milan found it easy to contain the opposition, given Desailly and Savićević influenced the tempo of the match. The latter came close to doubling Milan's lead when he broke forward and hit a shot goalwards, only for Seaman to divert the ball round the post. In the second half, Wright thought he had equalised for Arsenal when he tapped the ball in, but the referee disallowed the goal as there was infringement in the build-up. Milan continued to attack and extended their lead soon after; from Savićević's corner, Massaro jumped higher than his marker Lee Dixon and headed the ball into the Arsenal goal. Dixon, who required treatment early in the second half, was substituted for Martin Keown right away as he struggled to play on.

The home side's performance was lauded by journalist Russell Thomas, who opened his match report in The Guardian with the line "Milan produced football of ease and elegance way beyond the English capabilities." By contrast, Moore noted Arsenal had "looked a different side from the sterile and nervous one seen in domestic matches." Graham described Milan as "... the best team in Europe, or in the world. We've learnt a lot. But we could have given them a better game, though, and I am disappointed." Capello was content with Milan's win, and believed his team were "still about two months where we should be." It was his eighth trophy as manager of the club, one better than his predecessor Arrigo Sacchi. He said of the achievement: "The mentality of this great club is passed on from the older players to the younger players, so they learn self-sacrifice and how to fight for every trophy they go for."

Arsenal and Milan went on to reach the 1995 finals of the UEFA Cup Winners' Cup and UEFA Champions League respectively, though failed to retain their titles. Arsenal lost in extra time to Real Zaragoza, while Ajax beat Milan by a single goal.

=== Details ===
8 February 1995
20:30 CET

Milan (Italy)	2–0	(England) Arsenal
Boban 41'; Massaro 67'	Report

San Siro, Milan
Attendance: 23,953
Referee: Hellmut Krug (Germany)

Milan	Arsenal

GK	1	(Italy) Sebastiano Rossi
RB	2	(Italy) Mauro Tassotti
CB	5	(Italy) Alessandro Costacurta	(yellow card) 59'
CB	6	(Italy) Franco Baresi (c)
LB	3	(Italy) Christian Panucci
RM	9	(Croatia) Zvonimir Boban
CM	4	(Italy) Demetrio Albertini	(yellow card) 24'
CM	8	(France) Marcel Desailly
LM	7	(Italy) Roberto Donadoni
RF	10	(Federal Republic of Yugoslavia) Dejan Savićević		(substituted off) 89'
LF	11	(Italy) Daniele Massaro		(substituted off) 80'
Substitutes:
GK	12	(Italy) Mario Ielpo
CB	13	(Italy) Filippo Galli
RM	14	(Italy) Stefano Eranio		(substituted on) 80'
RF	15	(Italy) Paolo Di Canio		(substituted on) 89'
LF	16	(Italy) Alessandro Melli
Manager:
(Italy) Fabio Capello

GK	1	(England) David Seaman
RB	2	(England) Lee Dixon		(substituted off) 66'
LB	3	(England) Nigel Winterburn
CM	4	(Sweden) Stefan Schwarz
CB	5	(England) Steve Bould	(yellow card) 13'
CB	6	(England) Tony Adams (c)
CF	7	(England) Kevin Campbell		(substituted off) 76'
CF	8	(England) Ian Wright
CF	9	(Wales) John Hartson
CM	10	(England) Paul Merson
CM	11	(England) Ian Selley
Substitutes:
GK	16	(England) Vince Bartram
DF	12	(England) Martin Keown		(substituted on) 76'
DF	13	(England) Andy Linighan
MF	14	(Denmark) John Jensen
MF	15	(England) Ray Parlour		(substituted on) 66'
Manager:
(Scotland) George Graham

Assistant referees:
Egbert Engler (Germany)
Hans-Georg Füllbrunn (Germany)
Fourth official:
Bernd Heynemann (Germany)

Match rules

- 90 minutes
- 30 minutes of golden goal extra time if necessary
- Penalty shoot-out if scores still level
- Five named substitutes
- Maximum of two substitutions

== See also ==
- AC Milan in international football
- Arsenal F.C. in European football
- 1994–95 UEFA Champions League
- 1994–95 UEFA Cup Winners' Cup
- 1994–95 Arsenal F.C. season
- 1994–95 AC Milan season
