= Star Soccer =

Production
- Running time: 30 minutes

Star Soccer was a weekly football highlights programme in the United Kingdom, which ran on Associated Television (ATV) from 1965 until 1983 when it was replaced by a networked The Big Match and spin-off The Big Match Live.

== History ==
The programme's early years were from London but from August 1968 the show centred on Midlands teams. This coincided with the re-jigging of the ITV network. ATV was now a Midlands only broadcaster. The programme was hosted initially by Billy Wright and then Gary Newbon, occasionally joined by a guest in the studio. The main commentator was Hugh Johns, ITV's man at the microphone for the 1966 FIFA World Cup Final. Other commentators included Peter Lorenzo, Nick Owen and Peter Brackley.

== Format ==
The programme's format was typical of the time, extended highlights of a London (1965–68) based match and a Midlands based match (from August 1968) was the main attraction and then shorter highlights of two other games from around the country, covered by other ITV regions. Where possible this would be a game involving a Midlands team as the visiting team. The programme was broadcast during a "glory" period for Midlands-based teams: Derby County, Nottingham Forest and Aston Villa all won league championships during the show's run, the latter two adding European Cups as well. Wolverhampton Wanderers F.C. also had a successful spell, bagged a brace of League Cups and competed in Europe; Stoke City also won this competition in 1972. An entertaining West Bromwich Albion side broke new boundaries by including three black players, Coventry City gained a reputation as durable First Division battlers, and a young Trevor Francis dazzled all before him for Birmingham City before moving to Forest in the English game's first million-pound transfer.

All this was captured by the ATV cameras, but it wasn't just about the top division. Shrewsbury Town's promoted side were featured in Division 2 specials, and on FA Cup weekends many lower league sides were featured. ATV's links with ITC Entertainment enabled fans in the United States and Canada to watch the best of Midlands football, with top Star Soccer matches repackaged and syndicated, as All-Star Soccer, to television stations across the Atlantic. By 1983 the appetite for live football was growing and the FA allowed games to be shown in a deal with the BBC and ITV. Match of the Day Live and The Big Match Live would become the banners for TV football for the rest of the decade. Both networks continued to show highlights, however, they were invariably shunted to late night slots at a weekend.
