= John Helm (commentator) =

English sports commentator (born 1942)

John Helm (born 8 July 1942 in Baildon, West Riding of Yorkshire) is an English sports commentator who has commentated on football, golf, cricket and rugby league both for ITV and other broadcasters.

Helm is known for being a commentator on the international broadcast feed of various FIFA tournaments; he has provided live commentary at the FIFA World Cup (since 1982), the FIFA U-20 World Cup (since 2001), as well as numerous international football tournaments including youth and women's competitions. He is currently the club commentator and post-match interviewer for English football club Lincoln City.

== Early career ==
After working his way up through local and national newspapers, where he began his journalistic career in 1959, Helm broke into broadcasting on BBC Radio Leeds and was chosen from a number of local radio broadcasters to cover the 1974 Commonwealth Games in Christchurch, New Zealand. After this, he joined national BBC Radio Sport, then broadcast mainly on Radio 2's old medium wave (frequencies now used by BBC Radio 5 Live).

== ITV Sport ==
Helm's association with the BBC ended in 1981 with a move to ITV company Yorkshire Television, replacing Martin Tyler as the regional station's football commentator. At the end of his first season he was rewarded with a berth on the ITV team for the 1982 World Cup in Spain, covering all of Scotland's matches and the second round group featuring Italy, Brazil and Argentina.

When ITV's regional system of football coverage was largely abolished in 1983, Helm found himself fourth in the network pecking order covering matches for The Big Match and Midweek Sports Special. Martin Tyler and Peter Brackley were chosen above him to cover UEFA Euro 1984 in France, while Brian Moore headed for South America to cover the concurrent England tour of the continent.

In 1985 Helm commentated on the match between Bradford City and Lincoln City in which the Bradford City stadium fire took place, killing 56 supporters. He was subsequently part of the ITV team at the 1986 FIFA World Cup in Mexico, covering a number of key live games including two of Scotland's matches and a second round meeting between Italy and France.

ITV won exclusive rights to live Football League coverage in 1988, but Helm was not to provide commentary on any of their games during the four-year contract, reporting only on highlights. He was part of the ITV commentary team at the 1990 and 1994 World Cups, covering a semi-final at USA 1994.

After 1992, when ITV lost the rights to top flight English football, Helm was a regular voice of live football. For the following four years he covered live matches for Yorkshire TV, London Weekend Television and Granada as they carried coverage of the lower leagues. He also continued his network commitments covering live and recorded European football in the early years of the Champions League.

== Other networks ==
Helm had a minor role at Euro '96 in England, and the arrival of Peter Drury in 1998 meant that he had no part to play in the network's coverage of that year's World Cup in France. From there on his ITV work was restricted to recorded highlights in the Yorkshire region, but Helm branched out as a freelancer. International audiences heard him regularly on broadcasts of both the Premier League and the Champions League. He also featured briefly on British Eurosport.

In 2002, FIFA recruited him as one of their commentators for the World Cup in Korea/Japan, and he covered 39 of the 64 matches. He reprised the role at every tournament until 2018, and several other FIFA events. In addition to this, Helm was five's chief football commentator, reporting on UEFA Cup ties and the occasional international.

Helm has also commentated for Radio Robins on Radio Alty and Alty TV who cover Altrincham FC games.

In July 2025 he joined Lincoln City as the commentator and post-match interviewer for their club streaming service Imps+, and covered every competitive match in the 2025/26 season.

== Personal life ==
Helm is a keen fan of Bradford (Park Avenue) A.F.C.
