= Peter Brackley =

English Football commentator (1951–2018)

- Born: 13 June 1951; Brighton, England
- Died: 14 October 2018 (aged 67); Brighton, England
- Occupation: Football commentator
- Known for: The Big Match; Football Italia; Pro Evolution Soccer

Peter Brackley (13 June 1951 – 14 October 2018) was an English football commentator, perhaps most famous for commentating for Football Italia on Channel 4 in the 1990s, for the computer game series Pro Evolution Soccer until Pro Evolution Soccer 6 (after which Jon Champion replaced him as primary commentator), Michael Owen's World League Soccer '99. and UEFA Champions League 2000-01.

== Broadcasting career ==
=== Radio ===
He began his career at BBC Radio Brighton in the early 1970s, before moving to the network. During his time with BBC Radio in London, Brackley covered football – including two FA Cup Finals and the 1982 European Cup Final – and athletics, as well as presenting flagship programmes Sport on Two and Sports Report.

=== ITV ===
The summer of 1982 saw Brackley make the switch to television, initially with ITV company Central Independent Television replacing Hugh Johns. During his initial spell with the network he covered the 1986 FIFA World Cup and the European Championship in France in 1984 – including commentaries on semi-final matches in both tournaments. His first live match for ITV Sport was the First Division contest between Manchester United and Sheffield Wednesday in April 1986. He also stepped into the breach during the live broadcast of the 1986 European Cup Final between Barcelona and Steaua Bucharest alongside that night's ITV studio co-pundit, Ron Atkinson, when communication with the commentary team in Seville, Brian Moore and Kevin Keegan, was lost.

=== Sky ===
In 1988 Brackley left ITV. Still stuck behind Brian Moore, Martin Tyler and Alan Parry in the pecking order he made the move to Rupert Murdoch's Sky Television. The bulk of his work would be for the pan-European channel Eurosport, then part-owned by Sky. He led their commentary team at the 1990 FIFA World Cup in Italy, with Ian Darke, Paul Dempsey and Gary Bloom among his colleagues. Brackley was also behind the mic for Sky's first live matches, which came in the Zenith Data Systems Cup.

When Sky and BSB merged in 1991, Brackley took up other duties including regular FA Cup matches and weekly coverage of live Italian football. This was the continuation of a long relationship with coverage of Serie A, which had actually begun in the middle of the 1980s when he took up work for CSI Sports who picked up the international broadcast rights.

Brackley also commentated Eurosport's coverage of the 1991 World Masters snooker tournament at the NEC in Birmingham alongside Mike Watterson, Jim Wych, Willie Jamieson, Paul Wade and Phil Yates.

=== Football Italia ===
This association with Italian football deepened in 1992 when, in the wake of Paul Gascoigne's transfer from Tottenham to Serie A side Lazio, Channel 4 bought the rights to cover the league. For the next decade, they provided regular live games on Sunday afternoons, with Brackley commentating from a studio in England. He worked alongside James Richardson, Kenneth Wolstenholme, Gary Bloom, Ray Wilkins, Don Howe and Luther Blissett,

=== Return to ITV ===
1992 was an eventful year for Brackley, as he also returned to the fold at ITV Sport. Fresh from the shock of losing rights to the new Premier League to British Sky Broadcasting, the various ITV regions began to place more emphasis on live coverage of the lower leagues. On 16 August 1992, Brackley was partnered by Ron Atkinson for Central's first live broadcast of a Football League match since the split when Birmingham City faced Notts County at St Andrew's. From the second week on, Alan Parry became the regular voice on The Central Match Live until 1996 when ITV lost the rights to live league football.

This return to ITV saw Brackley feature prominently in coverage of another four World Cups, from 1994 to 2006 and the European Championships in 1996 and 2000. He was also a regular commentator on the network's Champions League programmes and contributed frequently to highlights programmes on Central and Meridian Broadcasting in the south of England. He also commentated on his only major final for ITV in 2000 – the League Cup final between Leicester City and Tranmere Rovers. From August 2001, he featured heavily in ITV's coverage of Premiership highlights on The Premiership. He commentated on the very first match of the very first programme in August 2001, Middlesbrough v Arsenal. In addition to his commentaries for the programme, he utilised his skills as an impressionist during the 'Brack Chat' segment of the Monday night highlights programme.

After the demise of the ITV Sport Channel in 2002, Brackley's network commitments were considerably reduced (though he continued to work on Premiership highlights until 2004), featuring only very occasionally before returning as part of the team for the World Cup in Germany in 2006. His main source of work was coverage of the England national football team and the FA Cup for international distributor Octagon CSI. He covered the majority of FA Cup Finals between 1992 and 2008 for them.

The 2008–09 season saw Brackley do the FA Cup highlights show for ITV. His games were Leicester–Stevenage, Fleetwood–Hartlepool, Hull–Newcastle, Doncaster–Aston Villa and Blackburn–Coventry.

== Other activities ==
As well as a successful broadcasting career, Brackley also carved a niche as a comedian and impressionist. He undertook several UK tours with Southampton fan and comedian Mike Osman, including a run as part of George Best and Rodney Marsh's stage show. He also performed with Osman, Richard Digance and others on several programmes for BBC Radio.

In 1990, Brackley stood in for an indisposed Jimmy Greaves on the long-running ITV Sport show Saint and Greavsie. The commentator provided the voice for Greaves' Spitting Image caricature. He also undertook voiceover work for Brighton & Hove Albion, the club he supported, and wrote a weekly column in the city's Argus newspaper.

== Death ==
Brackley died on 14 October 2018, at the age of 67, after a period of ill health.
