= Eleanor Oldroyd =

English sports broadcaster

- Born: 2 June 1962 (age 64); Bury, Lancashire, England
- Education: Oxford High School; Cambridge University
- Occupation: Sports broadcaster
- Spouse: Nick Mullins (divorced)
- Children: 2

Eleanor Oldroyd (born in Bury, Lancashire, 2 June 1962) is a British sports broadcaster with BBC Radio.

== Early life ==
Oldroyd was educated at Oxford High School and Girton College at Cambridge University.

== Broadcasting career ==
Beginning her career in commercial radio, Oldroyd joined BBC Radio Shropshire as a Sports Producer in 1986 before moving to London in 1988.

She worked at Newsbeat and then at BBC Sport, reporting and presenting on both Radio 5 and its successor 5 Live.

She first hosted the Sunday afternoon sports show on Radio 5 in 1993. In 1995, she became the first female presenter of Sports Report (since it started in 1948) when she stood in for Ian Payne on Radio 5 Live.

She is a regular on 5 Live's Fighting Talk – known as the "First Lady of Fighting Talk". She hosted several weekly 5 Live shows, the evening 5 Live Sport programme, Saturday Breakfast (with Chris Warburton), and the Friday Sports Panel.

She covers the Wimbledon tennis championships and was part of the Test Match Special team from 2000 to 2005.

She led the station's coverage of the 2014 Winter Olympics from Sochi. She has reported from multiple Winter and Summer Olympic Games.

She was named the Sports Journalists' Association Broadcast Presenter of the Year for 2014 and 2016

Following the death of His Royal Highness, Prince Philip, Duke of Edinburgh in 2021, she led the coverage of his funeral, sat in a small, specially built studio above the high altar. She was the only reporter or broadcaster present in St George's Chapel on the day of his funeral.

== Personal life ==
Oldroyd was formerly married to fellow BBC sports presenter Nick Mullins and has two children.

She supports Arsenal despite coming from a family of Birmingham City fans.
