= Sport on Five =

Sport on Five may refer to:

- 5 Live Sport - BBC Radio 5 programme, formerly Sport on 5
- Channel 5 (British TV channel)
