= John Murray (sports broadcaster) =

English sports broadcaster

John Murray (born 4 December 1966) is an English sports broadcaster, senior commentator and Football Correspondent for BBC Radio 5 Live.

== Biography ==
Murray was brought up on a family farm in Northumberland, which straddles Hadrian's Wall. He was educated at Haydon Bridge High School and studied geography at the University of Wales, Lampeter. His radio career began at TFM Radio (now Hits Radio Teesside) on Teesside. He joined BBC Tees in 1994. In 1995 he transferred to the BBC Radio Sport department in London and, by 1998, he had become part of the football commentary team.

He has also commentated on golf (including the Ryder Cup), cricket and Olympic Equestrian. Murray made his FA Cup final commentary debut on 5 Live on 15 May 2010, describing Chelsea's 1–0 victory over Portsmouth alongside Mike Ingham. He is now established as the first choice Sunday 4:30pm commentator.

In August 2014, Murray followed in the footsteps of Bryon Butler and Ingham by becoming the BBC's Football Correspondent.

He lives in North Yorkshire with his family.
