= Joe Edelston =

English footballer and manager

Personal information
- Full name: Joseph Edelston
- Date of birth: 27 April 1891
- Place of birth: Appley Bridge, England
- Date of death: 10 March 1970 (aged 78)
- Place of death: London, England
- Height: 5 ft 10 in (1.78 m)
- Position: Half back

Senior career*
Years	Team	Apps	(Gls)
1911–1912	Appley Bridge		
1912	St Helens Recreation		
1912–1920	Hull City	109	(0)
1920	Manchester City	6	(0)
1920–1924	Fulham	67	(0)

Managerial career
- 1925–1937: Fulham Reserves
- 1934: Fulham (caretaker)
- 1934–1935: Fulham (caretaker)
- 1938–1939: Brentford (assistant)
- 1939–1947: Reading
- * Club domestic league appearances and goals

Joseph Edelston (27 April 1891 – 10 March 1970) was an English professional football player and manager, best remembered for his 17 years serving Fulham in the Football League as a player, caretaker manager and reserve team manager. He also represented Hull City and Manchester City as a player and was included in the FA XI squad for a tour of South Africa in 1910. Later in his career he managed Reading and worked for Brentford and Leyton Orient as a coach. His son Maurice was also a footballer and later a successful sports broadcaster.
