= Stephen Grenfell (broadcaster) =

British writer and broadcaster

Stephen Grenfell was a writer and BBC Radio broadcaster. He presented BBC programmes including Sports Report. He appeared as a castaway on the BBC Radio programme Desert Island Discs on 10 August 1964.

Grenfell was born in Pretoria, South Africa and spent his formative years at Potchefstroom. In 1932 he left the country, heading for the United Kingdom for work. He served in the Second World War and was discharged in 1942 following injury. Later he joined the BBC where he was a scriptwriter, working on Radio Newsreel and with Richard Dimbleby on Down Your Way. After resigning to work freelance he wrote and narrated radio documentaries as well as writing radio plays.

Returning to South Africa in 1968 he became a freelance contributor to the South African Broadcasting Corporation with a specialism in talks on campaigns of the Second World War.

He died on 7 March 1989 in Johannesburg and was survived by his three daughters.
