= Hugh Johns =

British football commentator (1922–2007)

Hugh Johns

Hugh Richard Lewis Johns (6 September 1922 – 27 June 2007) was an English football commentator, best known for his appearances for ITV. During his career, he covered 1,000 matches including four FIFA World Cup finals.

== Early life and career ==
Johns was born in Wantage, Berkshire. He served in the Fleet Air Arm during World War II. After the war he tried acting whereupon he met his future wife, Joan Hatcher, who was then working as a stage manager in the West End. They married in late 1950. During the 1950s, he became a journalist working for a number of regional newspapers in England before becoming the Welsh sports columnist for The People.

== Football commentator ==
Johns became a football commentator at the behest of ATV mogul Lew Grade in 1966. ITV's coverage of the 1966 FIFA World Cup had Johns leading the commentary team, which also included Gerry Loftus, John Camkin and Barry Davies (later of the BBC). Johns had the honour of commentating on the final between England and West Germany. His description of Geoff Hurst's third goal, England's fourth in a 4–2 victory ("Seconds ticking away as Martin Peters goes forward, er Geoff Hurst goes forward, and he might make it three. He has! He has! And that's it. That's it."), was in contrast to his opposite number at the BBC, Kenneth Wolstenholme, with the often quoted line "Some people are on the pitch. They think it's all over ... it is now!"

His finest hour in audience terms came in the 1970 FIFA World Cup, when ITV won the ratings battle with the BBC. Johns described all of England's matches in the competition with former national team captain Billy Wright alongside him. In the final between Brazil and Italy, when he was partnered with former England captain Bobby Moore, he memorably greeted Pelé's opening goal with the words, "What a beautiful goal from Pelé! El Rey Pelé!"

Although Brian Moore was regarded as ITV's "number 1" commentator, Moore was for many years given the role of Anchorman/Presenter for many major football occasions covered on ITV. This led to Johns covering four FIFA World Cup finals in total, from 1966 to 1978, and two FA Cup Finals (1967–68). He was also the voice for ITV's live coverage of the European Cup Finals of 1968 – when Manchester United became the first English club to claim the trophy – and the 1970 final, when Celtic lost to Feyenoord. Later that year, Johns richly descriptive tones, would be the perfect fit for an epic World cup semi final, in which Italy beat West Germany 4–3 after extra time. Other memorable games that he covered, included the dramatic world cup qualifier on 17 October 1973, when Sir Alf Ramsey's England, failed to beat Poland at Wembley, in front of a 100,000 full house, and many millions watching the match live on ITV, missing out on a place at the 1974 FIFA World Cup finals tournament. Johns commentated on the final of that tournament, with hosts West Germany beating Holland 2–1.

Johns was the regular commentator on ATV's Star Soccer, taking over from Peter Lorenzo shortly after the programme's launch in the London area in October 1965. From August 1968 the programme was broadcast only in the Midlands after the re-allocation of ITV franchises that summer. During this period Johns saw Derby County (twice), Nottingham Forest and Aston Villa land the League Championship. He continued working for ATV, and subsequently Central Television until the summer of 1982, when he was replaced by BBC Radio 2 football commentator Peter Brackley. His last major ITV duties came at the World Cup that year in Spain, where he covered the matches in group 2, featuring West Germany, Austria, Algeria, and Chile. Johns registered his disgust several times, during his commentary on the match between West Germany and Austria, where the teams contrived their passage through to the next phase, at the expense of Algeria.

Until 1996 Johns continued to commentate for HTV Wales, making occasional network appearances on the odd international or Cup tie. He also produced a documentary on Ian Rush – simply called Ian. In an interview with ITV on his retirement he revealed that he helped to lubricate his vocal cords with a couple of pints of Brains Dark every day and was a regular smoker.

Johns was known as the "voice of Midlands football". In 2002, he was presented with a "Golden Microphone" by Brian Clough, for services to football in the Midlands. He also commentated on snooker, boxing, crown Green bowls and darts. He also narrated several documentaries, including Basildon our town in 1974, and Focus on Soccer for ITV in 1978.

== Personal life ==
In the early 60s, Johns moved to his house in Radyr near Cardiff where he was an active Freemason. His wife Joan died in November 2003 – they had been married for 53 years. They had one son, Mark. Hugh died in June 2007, aged 84.
