= Gigi Salmon =

British television presenter

- Born: November 1976 (age 49)
- Education: Oxford Brookes University
- Occupations: Journalist and presenter
- Years active: 1997–
- Employer(s): Talksport; BBC Radio 5 Live; Sky Sports

Gigi Salmon is a British sports journalist, presenter and commentator, with specialism in tennis.

== Career ==
A graduate of Oxford Brookes University, Salmon began her career at Radio Oxygen in September 1997. From there she worked as a newsreader and journalist on Talksport before presenting for Chelsea F.C. on Chelsea TV.

Salmon has presented and commentated on tennis for the All England Club's radio station Radio Wimbledon and for the BBC Radio 5 Live, with experience of commentating on tournaments across the world such as the Wimbledon Championships, the US Open, the French Open, and Australian Open. In 2023 she was announced as the new lead presenter of tennis for Sky Sports.

She presents the TENNISH podcast alongside British former professional tennis player Naomi Cavaday.
