= Jim Proudfoot =

British football commentator

Jim Proudfoot (born 16 December 1972) is an English football commentator who has worked on national radio and television since the late 1990s.

== Early life ==
Proudfoot was born in the West Country on 16 December 1972 but moved to the Midlands at a young age. He was educated at Solihull School.

== Career ==
His professional broadcasting career started in 1991 with the now-defunct DevonAir, for whom he was a football reporter and later DJ. Proudfoot subsequently worked as a journalist and newsreader for TFM in the north-east of England before moving to Capital Gold in 1994, where he was part of the award-winning team headed by Jonathan Pearce. Later stints followed as a commentator on South Coast Radio and Xtra AM in Birmingham before a move to national radio station Talksport in 1999.

Initially employed as the station's number-two commentator behind Alan Parry, Proudfoot became Talksport's lead commentator in time for the 2002 FIFA World Cup, a role that he has held for the vast majority of time since. He has subsequently commentated on both the UEFA Euro 2004 Final, and the 2006 FIFA World Cup Final and has long been established as Talksport's lead Champions League commentator.

Proudfoot also worked for satellite broadcaster Sky Sports for a number of years, specialising in commentating on Masters Football (six-a-side football for veteran and ex-players) and youth internationals. However Proudfoot was also one of the commentators on Sky's Premiership highlights programme "Goals on Sunday" and, from 2004, "Football First". In 2006, he followed Sky Sports colleague Ian Crocker to Setanta Sports, where he initially commentated on Italian football but, increasingly, on the Scottish Premier League. Despite being based in Scotland, Proudfoot was also seen on a number of English Premier League games, as well as regularly commentating on FA Cup and England under-21 games. His total of more than 300 matches for the station makes him the most prolific commentator in Setanta's short history.

Following the administration of Setanta Sports's UK division in June 2009, Proudfoot's contract at the company was terminated. In July 2009, he joined ESPN as a commentator, mainly focusing on European football including Bundesliga and Serie A, but also domestic competitions from time to time.

Proudfoot was Talksport's principal commentator at the 2010 World Cup, as well as being a part of ESPN's broadcast team for the tournament, but announced his departure after eleven years with the station to become commentator on Absolute Radio's coverage of the Premier League.

Proudfoot commentated on every edition in the first four seasons of Absolute Radio's Rock 'N Roll Football. The coverage was nominated for three Sony Radio Academy Awards, winning the Silver Award in the Best Sports Programme category in 2012. In January 2014 it was announced that Proudfoot would be returning to Talksport in advance of the 2014 FIFA World Cup. Since his return to Talksport Proudfoot has been principal commentator at both the 2014 World Cup, and Euro 2016, as well as England Internationals, whilst sharing commentary duties of Premier League games with Sam Matterface, amongst others. The station's coverage of Euro 2016 won the Sports Journalists' Association award for Best Live Sporting broadcast.

In addition, Proudfoot commentates on the Premier League for a worldwide television audience, primarily on Saturday afternoons.

He is a keen follower of Torquay United F.C.

=== Darts ===
Since 2013, he has commentated on the BDO World Darts Championship from the Lakeside Country Club in Frimley Green, for the BBC, Channel 4, and BT Sport. He has also commentated on both the PDC World Darts Championship and PDC Premier League for Talksport.
