= Time of Our Lives (TV series) =

Television series about British football

- Created by: Mark Pearman, Sky Sports
- Presented by: Jeff Stelling Gary Newbon
- Theme music composer: Queen
- Opening theme: These Are the Days of Our Lives

Production
- Executive producer: Mark Pearman

Original release
- Network: Sky Sports 1
- Release: 5 January 2009

Time of Our Lives is a television programme hosted by Jeff Stelling on Sky Sports. The format is a gathering of three players from a successful British football team from history talking over their memories of the team. Further programmes were presented by Gary Newbon when sportsmen and women were gathered from a collection of other great teams and sporting events.

== Episodes ==
Team	Title	First aired	Guests
Liverpool F.C.	"The Shankly Years"	5 January 2009	Ian St. John – Ron Yeats – Chris Lawler
Tottenham Hotspur F.C.	"Super Spurs"	12 January 2009	Steve Perryman – Ossie Ardiles – Glenn Hoddle
Chelsea F.C.	"Kings of the Kings Road"	19 January 2009	Ron Harris – David Webb – Peter Bonetti
Celtic F.C.	"The Lisbon Lions"	26 January 2009	Billy McNeill – Bertie Auld – Bobby Lennox
Leeds United A.F.C.	"The Revie Years"	2 February 2009	Jack Charlton – Norman Hunter – Paul Reaney
Arsenal F.C.	"Cup Double Winners"	9 February 2009	Alan Smith – Paul Merson – Ray Parlour
Everton F.C.	"Everton's Champions"	16 February 2009	Joe Royle – Howard Kendall – Colin Harvey
Nottingham Forest F.C.	"The Forest Fire"	23 February 2009	Peter Shilton – Kenny Burns – Larry Lloyd
Aberdeen F.C.	"The Dandy Dons"	2 March 2009	Willie Miller – Alex McLeish – Mark McGhee
West Ham United F.C.	"Best of the Hammers"	9 March 2009	Frank McAvennie – Phil Parkes – Tony Gale
Manchester City F.C.	"Mercer's Maine Men"	16 March 2009	Francis Lee – Mike Summerbee – Tommy Booth
Ipswich Town F.C.	"The Super Blues"	23 March 2009	John Wark – Paul Cooper – Eric Gates
Rangers F.C.	"The Kings of Ibrox"	30 March 2009	John Greig – Derek Johnstone – Sandy Jardine
Sunderland A.F.C.	"Heroes of 73"	6 April 2009	Jim Montgomery – Dennis Tueart – Dick Malone
Arsenal F. C.	"Double Winners"	13 April 2009	Frank McLintock – George Graham – Bob Wilson
Aston Villa F.C.	"Villa Rule Europe"	20 April 2009	Allan Evans – Tony Morley – Gary Shaw
Queens Park Rangers F.C.	"The Super Hoops"	11 May 2009	Stan Bowles – Gerry Francis – Dave Thomas
Wimbledon F.C.	"The Crazy Gang"	18 May 2009	Dave Bassett – Alan Cork – Wally Downes
Newcastle United	"The Entertainers"	1 June 2009	David Ginola – John Beresford – Steve Howey
Manchester United F.C.	"Sir Matt Busby"	8 June 2009	Denis Law – Alex Stepney – David Sadler
Stoke City F. C.	"Stokes' Silver"	10 August 2009	Gordon Banks – Terry Conroy – Denis Smith
Derby County F.C.	"Champion Rams"	24 August 2009	Roy McFarland – Colin Todd – Alan Durban
Everton F. C.	"Goodison Greats"	14 September 2009	Andy Gray – Graeme Sharp – Kevin Sheedy
Burnley F.C.	"Burnley's Champions"	21 September 2009	Jimmy McIlroy – Alex Elder – John Connelly
Wolverhampton Wanderers F. C.	"Wolves in the 70s"	28 September 2009	Kenny Hibbitt – John Richards – Mike Bailey
Newcastle United F. C.	"Fairs Cup 1969"	12 October 2009	Bobby Moncur – Pop Robson – Frank Clark
Blackburn Rovers F. C.	"The Rovers Return"	19 October 2009	Tim Sherwood – Colin Hendry – Tim Flowers
Coventry City F.C.	"Super Sky Blues"	26 October 2009	Dave Bennett – Brian Kilcline – Keith Houchen
Luton Town	"Top Hatters"	16 November 2009	Ricky Hill – Brian Stein – Steve Foster
West Ham United F. C.	"The Academy"	23 November 2009	John Bond – Ken Brown – Ronnie Boyce
Leeds United A.F.C.	"91–92 Champions"	30 November 2009	Lee Chapman – Gary McAllister – Gordon Strachan
Manchester United F. C.	"United's Return"	7 December 2009	Lou Macari – Sammy McIlroy – Jimmy Greenhoff
Leicester City F. C.	"The Silver Foxes"	14 December 2009	Steve Walsh – Matt Elliott – Muzzy Izzet
Ipswich Town F.C.	"The Ramsey Years"	21 December 2009	Ray Crawford – Ted Phillips – Larry Carberry
West Bromwich Albion F. C.	"Albion Cup Kings"	Unknown	Graham Williams – Graham Lovett – John Kaye
Tottenham Hotspur F. C.	Unknown	Unknown	Terry Dyson – Cliff Jones – Bobby Smith
Formula 1	Unknown	Unknown	Damon Hill - Murray Walker - Nigel Mansell
