= BBC Radio Shropshire =

BBC Local Radio service for Shropshire

Coordinates: 52.729758°N 2.743418°W

- Shrewsbury; England
- Broadcast area: Shropshire
- Frequencies: FM: 90.0 MHz (Church Stretton); FM: 95.0 MHz (Ludlow); FM: 96.0 MHz (Telford, Shrewsbury and Oswestry); FM: 104.1 MHz (Clun); DAB: 11B; Freeview: 713
- RDS: BBC Shrp

Programming
- Language: English
- Format: Local news, talk and music

Ownership
- Owner: BBC Local Radio, BBC West Midlands

History
- First air date: 23 April 1985

Technical information
- Licensing authority: Ofcom

Links
- Website: BBC Radio Shropshire

BBC Radio Shropshire is the BBC's local radio station serving Shropshire.

It broadcasts on FM, DAB, digital TV and via BBC Sounds from studios on Boscobel Drive in Shrewsbury.

According to RAJAR, the station has a weekly audience of 77,000 listeners as of May 2025.

== Technical ==
The 96 MHz FM signal from The Wrekin is the strongest, and can be heard from outside the county, especially along the M5 and M6 near Birmingham, as well as into western Staffordshire, southern Cheshire and Wrexham.

The other transmitters (on Black Hill near Clun, on Hazler Hill near Church Stretton, and in Mortimer Forest near Ludlow) have a much weaker signal only heard up to about 6 miles (10 km) away. These three transmitters are for broadcasting to the south of the county, which has a hilly terrain that reduces the effectiveness of FM transmissions.

The station also broadcasts on Freeview TV channel 713 in the BBC West Midlands region and streams online via BBC Sounds.

== Programming ==
Local programming is produced and broadcast from the BBC's Shrewsbury studios from 6 am to 2pm each day with Adam Green at breakfast and mid-morning with Clare Ashford. The Sunday breakfast programme also broadcasts from the station.

The station's late show, airing from 10 pm to 1 am, originates from either BBC Radio London or BBC Radio Manchester.

During the station's downtime, BBC Radio Shropshire simulcasts overnight programming from BBC Radio 5 Live.

== Presenters ==
=== Notable current presenters ===
- Adam Green, Michaela Wylde (Weekday Breakfast)
- Clare Ashford (Mid-morning)
- Paul Shuttleworth (Sunday Breakfast)

=== Notable former presenters ===
- Chris Hawkins (went on to BBC Radio Nottingham)
- Eleanor Oldroyd (went on to BBC Radio 5 Live and BBC Radio 1)
- Sybil Ruscoe (went on to BBC Radio 5 Live and BBC Radio 1)
- Ian Skelly (now on BBC Radio 3)
- Tim Smith (went on to BBC Radio 2; now at Jazz FM)
