= Ian Dennis (artist) =

British artist, most famous for posting videos (born 1987)

- Born: 19 December 1987 (age 38); Bradford, West Yorkshire, England
- Other name: Fox Bronte
- Occupations: Artist and YouTube personality
- Years active: 2005–present

Ian Dennis (born 19 December 1987) is a British artist, most famous for posting videos of him making art on YouTube under the online alias Fox Bronte.

== Early life ==
Ian Dennis was born in Bradford, West Yorkshire.

== YouTube ==
While living at a youth hostel, Dennis began making art videos using a variety of materials - including coffee, toothpaste, junk mail, jams, and soil.

Dennis then began making videos as "Fox Bronte," a character based on the stereotypical "mad artist." Using humour and a surreal editing style, his channel quickly grew in both popularity and controversy, with Fox Bronte regularly taking his clothes off to create. Other videos included him using his penis, his vomit, and condoms. In January 2010, he drank different coloured juices to change the colour of his urine - to create a portrait of the British National Party's then-leader Nick Griffin.

Ian Dennis's latest channel "monalisanaked" follows on from his previous work. His videos attract a cult audience to the website.

== Other works ==
In 2012, Dennis set up a prank appearance on Britain's Got Talent. As Fox Bronte he painted the hosts, Anthony McPartlin and Declan Donnelly on his buttocks.
