= Gary Newbon =

British sports presenter

Gary Newbon MBE
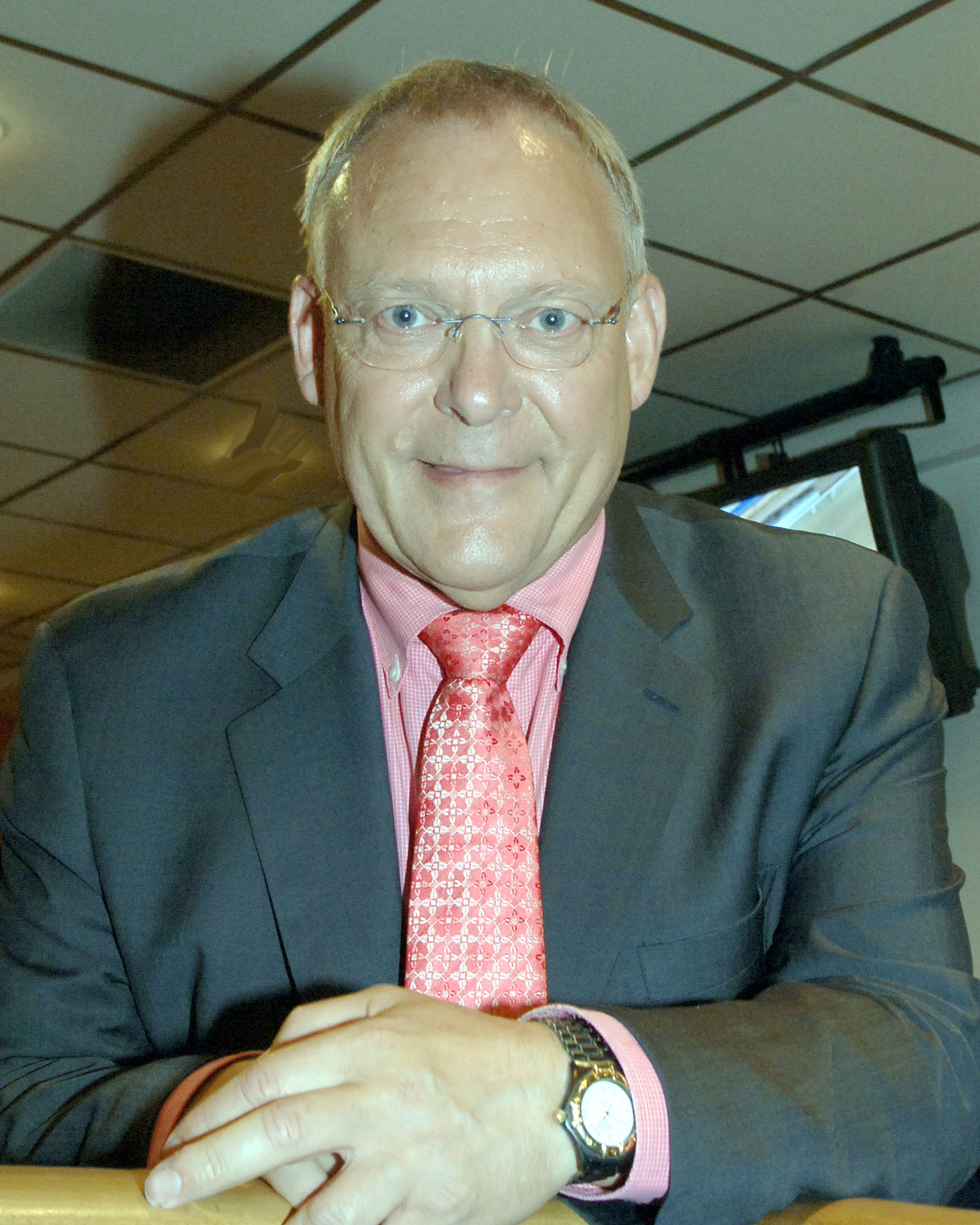
- Born: 15 March 1945 (age 80); Cambridge, England
- Occupation: Sports broadcaster
- Spouse: Katie Newbon
- Children: 3, including Neil

Gary Newbon MBE (born 15 March 1945) is an English television sports presenter and executive.

== Biography ==
Born in Cambridge, Newbon attended Culford School near Bury St Edmunds, where he captained the rugby first XV and edited the school magazine. Upon leaving school he became a junior reporter in Cambridge and then a freelance Fleet Street journalist reporting on tennis and rugby union. He began his television career at Westward Television in the 1960s, and then as an ATV sports reporter for their ATV Today programme in the early 1970s.

The continuing illness of ATV Controller of Sports Billy Wright meant that Newbon and a small team, including Trevor East, had to carry out Wright's functions. Newbon himself later became Controller of Sports (West Midlands) for ATV and, later, for Central Television. He presented sports reports on regional news programmes, reported on football and hosted boxing and darts programmes for the ITV network, whilst hosting sports coverage on ATV and Central and also performing his executive role.

Newbon conducted post-match interviews, including a memorable exchange with Brian Clough after Nottingham Forest had lost 4–0 to Everton, when Clough responded to Newbon's question about Forest's lack of commitment by saying: "Because they're just like you and me, Gary – a bunch of pansies", after which Clough kissed Newbon on the cheek and walked off.

Newbon became well known as a roving reporter for ITV Sport, especially in obtaining match reactions from players in the tunnels during UEFA Champions League games. His role was later filled by Gabriel Clarke.

Newbon left ITV after 36 years and moved to Sky Sports. He hosted the football phone-in show You're On Sky Sports, which was usually scheduled immediately after the evening's main game. He also hosts live greyhound racing on Sky Sports as well as Time of Our Lives.

In 2004, he presented a Final Whistle, a phone-in show on talkSPORT, which was aired on Saturdays between 17:00 and 20:00 after the day's league fixtures. He later returned to talkSPORT with a weekend breakfast programme in August 2008. In 2005, he presented the inaugural Premier League Darts event on Sky Sports.

After his ITV Sport reporter job, Newbon returned to ITV Central and became the Central Sports reporter on Central's flagship news programme Central News at Six, before being replaced by Sarah Jane Mee and Matt Teale in 2005. He also led the ITV Sport team at his time at Central, during which they won various awards for their UEFA Champions League, Formula One coverage and sports documentaries.

Newbon subsequently returned to Central's screens as a pundit on Central Soccer Night in 2005 before moving to his current job at Sky Sports.

Also was a part of the Telford Tigers Ice Hockey club being formed.

== Personal life ==
Newbon and his wife Katie live in Solihull. They have three children: Claire Newbon (a journalist) and twins Neil Newbon (an actor) and Laurence Newbon (a cameraman).

Newbon was appointed a Member of the Order of the British Empire (MBE) in the 2019 New Year Honours, "for services to media, to sport and to charity".
