= Rob Hawthorne =

English football commentator

- Born: May 1965 (age 60); Dudley, England
- Occupation: Football commentator
- Employer: Sky Sports (1995-present)

Robert Hawthorne (born 3 May 1965) is an English football commentator, currently working for Sky Sports. He is notable for his commentating alongside Andy Gray in the 2005 UEFA Champions League final in Istanbul.

He was born in Dudley, Worcestershire now West Midlands. He was a pupil at Foxyards Primary School and later the Blue Coat School.

== Early career ==
His media career began at the age of 14, when he was still a pupil at the Blue Coat School. He participated in a talent spotting competition hosted by Radio West Midlands, which he eventually won with his piece covering the 1979 European Cup Final between Nottingham Forest and Malmö. Afterwards, he was taken on by Beacon Radio in Wolverhampton.

Rob also appeared and presented quite regularly on Dudley and District Hospital Broadcasting (DDHB) from the Guest, Burton Road, and Russell Hall hospitals in the Black Country area of Dudley.

== Five Live ==
He became one of the regular commentators on live broadcasts for BBC Radio 5, shortly after its launch, before moving on to BBC Radio 5 Live with the rest of its sports team in 1994. After senior commentators Mike Ingham and Alan Green, Hawthorne and colleague Ron Jones formed the second "tier" of commentators. During his time on radio Hawthorne commentated on several Division One Play-off finals, the Scottish Cup Final, a number of FA Cup and League Cup semi-finals and two major international tournaments - Euro 92 and World Cup 1994.

== Television commentary ==
His first live television experience came in 1991, when he covered Brazilian championship football games for Screensport.

=== Sky Sports ===
Hawthorne's move to television was completed as he became part of the Sky Sports commentary team covering Monday night games in the F.A. Premier League; his first live game was Leeds United versus Liverpool in August 1995.

But after his first season covering Monday Night Football (having commented on the title showdown between Newcastle United and Manchester United) Hawthorne worked alongside Alan Brazil and commentated on some memorable play off finals such as Charlton Athletic v Sunderland from 1998 and Manchester City v Gillingham from 1999. He was moved back to covering Monday Night Football and some Saturday games in 2001. He has commentated on League Cup finals, FA Cup matches, and most of the Republic of Ireland's matches. In 2003, when Sky gained coverage of UEFA Champions League football live, Hawthorne added this tournament to the growing list of tournaments he has commentated on; this ceased in 2015 when Sky lost the rights to BT Sport. In 2005, he commentated on the famous Liverpool v AC Milan Champions League Final with Andy Gray, as Sky's lead commentator Martin Tyler was covering England. More recently, Hawthorne commentated over the 2019 EFL Cup Final between Manchester City and Chelsea alongside Alan Smith and commentated on the 2023 final which was between Newcastle United and Manchester United alongside Gary Neville and Jamie Carragher.
