= Mark Saggers =

British journalist and radio presenter

Mark Leonard Saggers (born 28 May 1959) is a British journalist and radio presenter.

== Early life ==
He attended the Perse School, Cambridge, 1970–77 and was a keen sportsman representing the school at rugby, hockey, and cricket. As a schoolboy, he was a regular on the Newmarket Road End terrace at Cambridge United Football Club.

== Sporting career ==
Saggers, or Whanam as he is sometimes known, played cricket as a specialist wicket-keeper for Cambridgeshire County Cricket Club through the 1980s; this included two list A cricket matches, although he averaged only 3.50 runs with the bat. He also represented England at hockey.

== Broadcasting career ==
Saggers began his broadcasting career at BBC Radio Cambridgeshire. He also worked occasionally for Clubcall, and according to Backpass, the retro football magazine (issue 39), once commentated for 45 minutes on Northampton Town v Cambridge United, sending the commentary to the Exeter City Clubcall line by mistake. He then joined BBC Radio Sport in 1989. and became a regular sporting voice on Radio 4's Today programme. He won a Sony Award for his reporting of the false start at the 1993 Grand National.

In 1992, Saggers left the BBC to join Sky News as senior sports correspondent. He was perhaps best known to international audiences as the voice of the Premier League football highlights show.

In 2001 Saggers returned to the BBC, presenting Sport on Five.

He has commentated for Test Match Special.

Saggers joined Talksport in June 2009. This followed the BBC declining to renew his contract and his reported deep rift with Radio 5 Live commentator Alan Green.
