= Nick Mullins =

British journalist and sports commentator

- Born: 31 January 1966 (age 60)
- Occupations: Journalist, sports commentator
- Spouse: Eleanor Oldroyd (divorced) Melissa Platt (married 2016)
- Children: 2

Nick Mullins (born 31 January 1966) is a British journalist and sports commentator, primarily working on TNT Sports's Premiership Rugby coverage and The BBC's Wimbledon coverage.

== Early life ==
Mullins began his career as a journalist with the Loughborough Trader and Loughborough Echo.

== Commentary career ==
Mullins joined the BBC in 1985 and moved to BBC Radio Sport in 1991.

He was part of the Rugby Special team and covered Six Nations Championship, Premiership, Heineken Cup and Anglo-Welsh Cup rugby matches for the BBC. He also commentated at Wimbledon for Radio 5 Live. He has commentated at the Olympic Games since 1996.

In 2010, Mullins left the BBC to commentate on ESPN's rugby coverage. Mullins was also ITV Sport's chief commentator at the 2011 Rugby World Cup in New Zealand and 2015 Rugby World Cup, where he commentated on the final with Ben Kay and Lawrence Dallaglio. In 2013, Mullins moved to BT Sport following their acquisition of the Premiership Rugby rights and their subsequent takeover of ESPN. He has also provided commentary from the French Open Tennis for ITV Sport, and the University Boat Race.

He is part of the BBC Commentary team for Wimbledon.

== Controversy ==
Mullins was criticized by players and fans alike for a comment he made during the opening match of the 2015 Rugby World Cup. Commentating for ITV, he referred to Fijian fans "back in Fiji around one TV hoping the generator doesn't fail them." Fijian winger Nemani Nadolo voiced his displeasure at the remarks following the match on Twitter.

== Writing ==
As well as commentating, Mullins has contributed to blogs from some of the events he has commentated at, including the Olympic Games and the French Open. He is also a columnist for ESPN Scrum.com.

== Personal life ==
Mullins is a supporter of Leicester City. He was previously married to Radio 5 Live presenter Eleanor Oldroyd, and they have two children. In 2016, Mullins married Melissa Platt. Platt was a reporter for Sky Sports and the Head of Communications for the now defunct Wasps Rugby Club she is currently the Head of Media for the Rugby Players' Association (RPA).
