= Sports Report =

British sports radio programme

- Genre: Sports news and results
- Running time: 30–60 minutes
- Country of origin: United Kingdom
- Language: English
- Home station: BBC Light Programme (1948–1964); Network Three (1964–1967); BBC Radio 3 (1967–1970); BBC Radio 2 (1970–1990); BBC Radio 5 (1990–1994); BBC Radio 5 Live (1994–present)
- Hosted by: Mark Chapman
- Original release: 3 January 1948
- Opening theme: "Out of the Blue" by Hubert Bath
- Website: www.bbc.co.uk/programmes/b00cx435

Sports Report is one of the longest-running programmes on British radio, and is the world's longest-running sports radio programme. It started on 3 January 1948, and has always been broadcast from 17:00 on Saturday evenings during the football season, although the length of the programme has varied in more recent times depending on whether the BBC has a commentary of a 17:30 Premier League match.

Originally produced by Angus Mackay, it was broadcast on the BBC Light Programme until 25 April 1964. On 22 August 1964 it became part of Sports Service and moved to Network Three (which later became BBC Radio 3) where it initially started at the earlier time of 16:42. On 4 April 1970, however, it moved back to what had by then become BBC Radio 2, where it remained until 25 August 1990 as part of Sport on 2. From 1 September 1990 to 26 March 1994 it moved to the original BBC Radio 5, and since 2 April 1994 it has been broadcast on BBC Radio 5 Live as part of 5 Live Sport.

In February 1969 Mary Raine was sent to report on the Chelsea–Sunderland league game for Sports Report, becoming the first woman to report on sport for the BBC.

== Classified football results ==
There were two readings of the classified football results which had topped and tailed the programme. The first reading followed the opening headlines and a late-comers' reading was at approximately 5.50 pm.

The start of the 2022–23 English football season saw the axing of the Saturday afternoon classified football results without prior warning or fanfare when BBC announced it had dropped the classified results from the programme because it had been shortened ahead of the 17:30 Premier League match.

== Presenters ==
- Raymond Glendenning (1948–53)
- Stephen Grenfell (1948–53)
- W J (Bill) Hicks (Sports Editor and broadcaster)
- Eamonn Andrews (1950–64)
- Robin Marlar (1964–68)
- Liam Nolan (1965–66)
- Peter Jones (1968–70)
- Des Lynam (1970–80)
- Mike Ingham (1980–85)
- Renton Laidlaw (1985–87)
- John Inverdale (1987–94)
- Ian Payne (1994–2000)
- Mark Pougatch (2000–2016)
- Mark Chapman (2016–present)

== Classified football results announcers ==
- John Webster (1948–1974)
- James Alexander Gordon (1974–2013)
- Charlotte Green (2013–2022)

== Theme tune ==
The programme has used the same theme music since its inception – "Out of the Blue", written by Hubert Bath. It is said that Lynam prevented the theme from being dropped in the 1970s due to it sounding old-fashioned.

The use of the closing part of "Out of the Blue" to end the programme was unceremoniously dropped by the BBC in the mid-2000s.

On Saturday 5 January 2013, Sports Report did not open with "Out of the Blue" for the first time, prompting a string of tweets and presenter Mark Pougatch to tweet shortly afterwards that:

For clarification. The Sports Report music has not been axed.

"Out of the Blue" was subsequently played an hour later.
