= David Oates =

British sports commentator

- Born: 1962
- Died: 3 February 2013 (aged 50); London, England

David Andrew Oates (1962 – 3 February 2013) was a British sports commentator for the BBC. A BBC journalist for more than 25 years, he provided regular commentary and reporting on BBC Radio 5 Live.

== Biography ==
Oates was born in 1962. He covered three football FIFA World Cups, three Rugby League World Cups and two Commonwealth Games for the BBC, and provided commentary for the BBC's coverage of the shooting events at the 2012 Summer Olympics. He was also commentating for BBC Radio 5 when Fabrice Muamba collapsed on the pitch during a game and was praised for the professional way he approached the situation. He was a keen Blackpool F.C. supporter. He also took part in several London marathons.

Oates died in London after a short illness on 3 February 2013, at the age of 50. He was survived by his wife, Charlotte, a BBC Sport producer, and their two children, Imogen and Kate. To show respect Blackpool F.C produced a two-page memorial in the match magazine when they played Millwall on 9 February 2013, also made a Blackpool F.C. shirt with Oates on the back as well as the number 62, the year in which he was born.
