= Eilidh Barbour =

Scottish television presenter and reporter (born 1982)

- Born: Eilidh Margaret Barbour; 14 December 1982 (age 43); Dunkeld, Perthshire, Scotland
- Education: University of Stirling
- Occupations: Television presenter, reporter

Eilidh Margaret Barbour (/ˈeɪli ˈbɑːrbʊər/; born 14 December 1982) is a Scottish television presenter and reporter. In 2017, she was named as the main presenter for the BBC's golf coverage, replacing Hazel Irvine in the role.

== Career ==
In 2005, Barbour graduated from the University of Stirling, having studied Film and Media Studies, with an emphasis on audio and video production. She then moved to South Korea for a year to teach English, before returning to Scotland with the intention of finding a job within broadcasting. Her persistence paid off, for six months later she got a job with STV, primarily editing its football and rugby highlights. She later took various reporting jobs, before becoming the presenter of STV Rugby for the 2011–12 season, which focused on the Scottish rugby teams in the Pro12. She has occasionally presented the results and international highlights on BBC Scotland's Sportscene.

In November 2014, Barbour came to national attention when she was a pitchside reporter at a first round FA Cup match during a special episode of Final Score. From 2016 onward she has been a regular reporter for Final Score. Also in 2016, she filled in for Dan Walker as presenter for Football Focus when Walker was in Rio de Janeiro covering the Olympics. The following year, Barbour became the presenter of The Women's Football Show.

In July 2017, she was named as the main presenter for the BBC's golf coverage, replacing Hazel Irvine, to whom she had written for career advice and who had been a major influence on her career. Barbour's father had always played golf, and she took up the sport in her teenage years, around the same time when her own mother wanted to learn as well. For the Pyeongchang 2018 Winter Olympics, Barbour was one of the main presenters of the BBC's coverage. In December 2018, she joined the presenting team for Match of the Day 2 when she stood in for regular host Mark Chapman. In June 2019, Barbour was part of the BBC presenter team for the Women's World Cup, hosting, among others, the quarter-final between Germany and Sweden.

In December 2019, she was the presenter for the first Premier League game to be shown live on Amazon Prime Video, Crystal Palace vs. Bournemouth.

At the Scottish Football Writers Association (SFWA) gala dinner on 8 May 2022 in Glasgow, Barbour was among attendees who walked out in protest at the sexist content of an after-dinner speech and commented afterwards that she "never felt so unwelcome in the industry". The SFWA issued a formal apology the following day stating that this "will act as a catalyst to review and improve the format of our future events" to make them inspirational for all. Barbour received complaints in July 2022 for stating that the English Women's team which beat Norway 8–0 in Euro 2022 was 'too white'.

== Personal life ==
Barbour is a lifelong supporter of St. Johnstone.

As of 2022, Barbour is in a relationship with former Hibernian footballer Marvin Bartley.
