= Martin Tyler =

English football commentator and coach

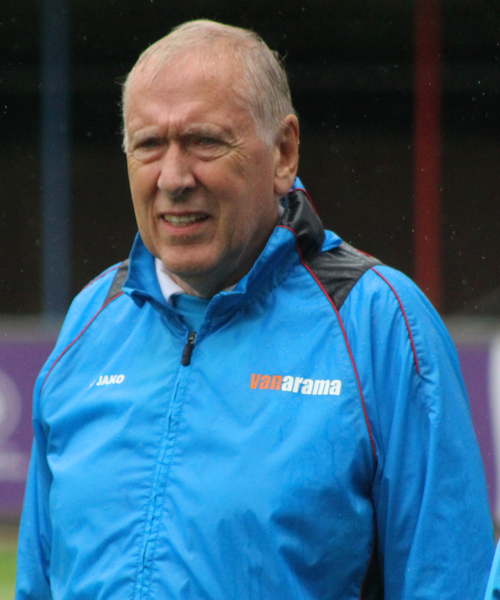
- Tyler coaching Hampton & Richmond Borough, 2017
- Born: 14 September 1945 (age 81); Chester, England
- Education: Royal Grammar School, Guildford; University of East Anglia
- Occupations: Football commentator Football coach
- Employer(s): Sky Sports, SBS Australia, IMG, Premier League Productions

Martin Tyler (born 14 September 1945) is an English football commentator and coach. He worked as a commentator for Sky Sports from 1990 to 2023, covering the Premier League and UEFA Champions League, as well as other domestic and international competitions. Tyler had previously commentated for ITV in the 1970s and 1980s. He provided his voice to the football video game series FIFA from 2005 until 2019. In 2003, he was voted the FA Premier League Commentator of the Decade. Since 2005, Tyler has worked as a coach for a number of teams managed by Alan Dowson.

== Football commentary career ==
Tyler was a ghostwriter on football pundit Jimmy Hill's column in The Times and reported matches under his own name for the paper. At Hill's urging, he took a job behind the scenes on LWT's The Big Match. His job was solely a production role, but at one match he did his own commentary on a tape recorder and handed it in to his bosses.

On 28 December 1974, ITV region Southern Television's regular football commentator Gerry Williams was indisposed, and Tyler made his commentary debut at The Dell describing a Second Division clash between Southampton and Sheffield Wednesday. Six weeks later he was asked back, soon becoming a regular commentator.

In 1976, Tyler moved to Yorkshire Television and began to make an impression on ITV Sport bosses, who included him in the team for the 1978 World Cup. Another change of region came in 1981 as Tyler moved to Granada in his native North West. In 1982, he led ITV's World Cup team, covering every England game and the final alongside Ian St. John.

Throughout the 1980s, Tyler established himself as the ITV network's number two commentator behind Brian Moore. He led the team at the 1984 European Championships and also commentated all the main matches at the 1986 World Cup except the final, for which Moore flew out from London. From 1983, ITV began to show live Football League matches, with Tyler involved in several such broadcasts over the next seven years.

=== BSkyB (Sky Sports) ===
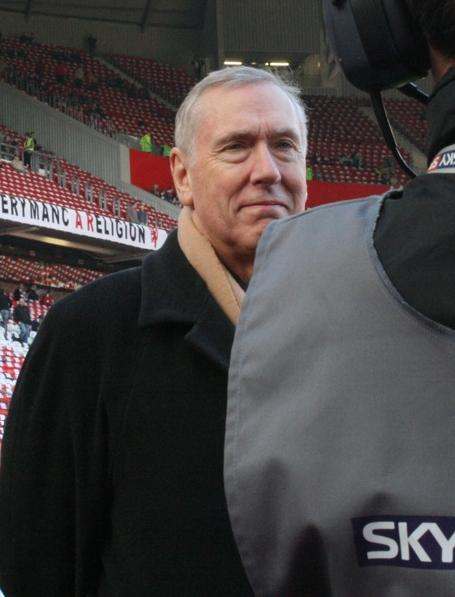
Tyler before the Manchester derby at Old Trafford in February 2008

The frustration of being the number two commentator saw Tyler search for new opportunities and, despite his own reluctance, he signed a deal with British Satellite Broadcasting's Sports Channel in 1990 at the urging of his agent John Hockey. There he covered live FA Cup games, England internationals and the Scottish League. Tyler's voice was still heard on ITV for another two years as they carried the commentaries he provided for the Football League's overseas broadcasts. British Satellite Broadcasting's merger with Sky meant the Sports Channel became Sky Sports in 1991. He then led the Sky commentary team, spearheading the network's coverage of the FA Premier League from its inception in 1992 until the conclusion of the 2022–23 season. On Sunday 16 August 1992, on Sky Sports, he commentated on the first pay-TV match in the history of the English football championship, Nottingham Forest–Liverpool.

In April 2003, in the Premier League 10 Seasons Awards, Tyler was voted as the Premier League Commentator of The Decade by fans and a specially assembled panel of football experts. After learning of the honour Tyler stated, "I'd like to thank everybody who voted for me and express my gratitude to all my colleagues at Sky Sports. This award is as much for them as myself and reflects our approach to football. My job has also been made easier by the thousands of individuals within the game who've answered my daily requests for information with the attention and care that make this job so enjoyable."

In 2005, Sky began a rotation policy with their leading commentators. Top matches were shared more equally between Tyler, Alan Parry, Rob Hawthorne and Ian Darke – who had returned to football on a regular basis after ten years prioritising boxing. Hawthorne covered the 2005 UEFA Champions League Final for the network. Doubts about the security of his position as Sky's number one commentator alerted rival broadcasting corporations. In January 2007 he was approached by Setanta to be their lead commentator for live Premiership football in 2007–08, but rejected the move and signed a new contract with Sky Sports. Tyler stepped down as a commentator for Sky Sports after 33 years of service in 2023.

=== SBS Television Australia ===
Since 1990, Tyler has been the main voice for broadcasts on the Australian television network Special Broadcasting Service (SBS) for the FIFA World Cup, UEFA European Championship and European club competition matches as well as a number of Australian international matches. With the exception of 2010, when he worked for ESPN in the United States, he has now covered eight World Cup tournaments for SBS.

=== Fox Sports (United States) ===
Fox used Tyler's Sky commentary to cover the 2010 UEFA Champions League Final. It was the first time the Champions League final had been broadcast on a major American television network. In addition, he led ESPN's coverage of the 2010 FIFA World Cup and was set to return for the 2014 tournament. However, on 8 January 2014, ESPN and Tyler announced they had agreed to part ways ahead of the 2014 World Cup so that he could focus on Premier League games live on Sky Sports.

=== Other work ===
Having established himself as a leading ITV commentator in the 1980s, Tyler also took on a large amount of freelance work. He has worked for Screensport, commentating on the Freight Rover Trophy Area in 1985 and the Screensport Super Cup in 1986, as well as several South American qualifying matches for the 1990 World Cup.

Between 1986 and 1993, Tyler was a regular voice on Octagon CSI's international feed of Serie A along with Peter Brackley. In May 1988, he was the commentator on Sky Television's first football match coverage – a friendly between Manchester United and AC Milan at Old Trafford (the channel had previously broadcast externally produced highlights packages).

With his Sky Sports colleague Alan Smith and the former Arsenal and West Ham United player Stewart Robson, Tyler commentated on the English-language international coverage of the UEFA Champions League and the UEFA Euro since the 2015–16 season, managed by UEFA, as well as the FA Cup and the Community Shield managed by the FA.

=== Other sports ===
Although mostly associated with football, Tyler has commentated on other sports. He contributed to Granada TV's cricket coverage of Roses Match's throughout his time there, and described action from live netball for ITV's World of Sport. In the mid-1980s, Tyler also anchored Channel 4's coverage of baseball's World Series.

=== Film and video games ===
Tyler was the default commentator for the FIFA video game series from 2005 to 2020, alongside Andy Gray between 2005 and 2010 and Alan Smith from 2011 to 2020.

Tyler also appeared as a commentator in Mike Bassett: England Manager (2001) and Goal! (2005).

== Football coaching ==
In 2005, Tyler joined Walton & Hersham as a coach and has since worked with manager Alan Dowson at Kingstonian and Hampton & Richmond Borough. In May 2018, he followed Dowson to National League club Woking, a team he has supported since he was young. Following the departure of Dowson in late February 2022, Tyler also opted to leave the club, concluding a four-year spell with the Surrey-based side.

Ahead of the 2022–23 season, Tyler linked up with Dowson again and became a coach at Dartford. In the 2023–24 season, Tyler joined Dowson as coach for a short interim spell at Hemel Hempstead Town.
