= Renton Laidlaw =

British golf broadcaster and journalist (1939–2021)

Henry Renton Laidlaw (6 July 1939 – 12 October 2021) was a British golf broadcaster and journalist.

== Biography ==
Laidlaw was born in Morningside, Edinburgh in July 1939. He started working as a copytaker, compiling sports results. Laidlaw then moved to the Edinburgh Evening News, working for five years as a junior reporter, before becoming a golf writer in 1962. He then moved into television and radio, becoming one of the best recognised commentators in the sport. He also presented Sport on 2 and Sports Report between 1985 and 1987.

Laidlaw retired in 2015 and latterly lived in Drumoig, near Pickletillum, Fife with his sister. He died in Ninewells Hospital, Dundee on 12 October 2021, at the age of 82. Two days before his death, Laidlaw had tested positive for COVID-19 amid the COVID-19 pandemic in the United Kingdom.
