= Bryon Butler =

English writer and broadcaster

Ewart Bryon Butler (5 June 1934 – 26 April 2001) was an English writer and broadcaster, best known as the BBC's football correspondent from 1968 to 1991.

He was born in Taunton, Somerset and educated at Taunton School. After working for a number of regional newspapers, he joined the News Chronicle shortly before its closure in 1960, soon moving to The Daily Telegraph. Around this time, he also started reporting football matches for the BBC, and in 1968 became a radio commentator and the corporation's football correspondent. He was well known for his crisp, eloquent, precise style, with a distinctive West Country undertone to his voice. Although he often did not actually commentate on the very big occasions, frequently taking a side role as summariser (in earlier years) or presenter or reporter (in later years), he commentated on a number of World Cup finals, as well as the famous quarter-final between England and Argentina in 1986. He frequently worked alongside Maurice Edelston, Peter Jones, Alan Parry and, latterly, Alan Green and Mike Ingham. He wrote or co-wrote a number of football books including the history of the Football Association. He and also wrote for the Daily Telegraph on cricket. In the 1970s he had written the newspaper review "In the Press" for The Cricketer Magazine. In 1991, he retired as the BBC's football correspondent to concentrate on his writing career. He also gave up commentary around this time.

On his death in 2001, he was widely mourned as a representative of a bygone era of sports broadcasting, arguably less brash and more eloquent than the present.
