= Vicki Sparks =

English sports journalist

Victoria Sparks is a British sports journalist and football commentator for BBC Sport and BT Sport. She has reported for Final Score and BBC Radio 5 Live. She also regularly covers women's football for the BBC.

In March 2017, after a post-match interview, Sunderland manager David Moyes took issue at one of Sparks' questions to him and said: "You were just getting a wee bit naughty at the end there, so just watch yourself. You still might get a slap even though you’re a woman. Careful the next time you come in". In June, The Football Association fined him £30,000 for "improper and threatening remarks".

Sparks was part of the BBC's team covering the 2018 FIFA World Cup in Russia. On 20 June of that year, she became the first woman to commentate on a live World Cup match on British television, BBC One's coverage of Portugal's 1–0 victory over Morocco in Group B in Saransk. Sparks and female pundits Eniola Aluko and Alex Scott were subjected to online criticism; while former player Jason Cundy said Sparks' voice was too high-pitched for commentary, Jacqui Oatley and Piers Morgan praised her and said that the criticism was due to sexism. Sparks has also guested on the BBC Radio 5 Live show Fighting Talk.

In July 2023, she was announced to be commentating for the BBC at the 2023 FIFA Women's World Cup. In November 2023, she was nominated in the Commentator of the Year category at the Football Supporters' Association awards.

In June 2026 she commentated at the FIFA Men’s World Cup.

== Early career ==
Sparks' broadcasting career began with work experience at BBC Radio Surrey and BBC Radio Durham.

Her first professional commentary came in January 2014, when she covered Middlesbrough's 1-0 victory over Charlton Athletic in the Championship for BBC Radio London.
