= Alan Parry =

English sports commentator (born 1948)

- Born: 20 August 1948 (age 78); Garston, Liverpool
- Years active: 1973–present
- Sports commentary career
- Genre: Main commentator
- Sports: Football; athletics
- Employer: Sky UK (1997–present); Talk Radio UK (1998–2002); ITV (1985–1996); BBC (1973–1985); BBC Radio (1973–1981)

Alan Parry (born 20 August 1948 in Garston, Liverpool) is an English sports commentator, commentating on football and athletics. He has commentated for all four main broadcasters of football in the UK – the BBC, BT Sport, ITV and Sky TV, as well as for both BBC and commercial radio.

== Biography ==
Starting his career at BBC Radio Merseyside, he joined the BBC in London in 1973, and immediately started regular football commentaries and established himself as one of the most prominent voice in footballing commentary. Within a short time he was covering England matches, and in 1975 he was covering the European Cup final. After the death of Maurice Edelston he started working alongside Peter Jones covering the FA Cup Final in 1976. By the mid-1970s he was also BBC Radio's athletics commentator, covering the 1976, 1980 and 1984 Summer Olympics, 1974, 1978 and 1982 European Athletics Championships, 1974, 1978 and 1982 Commonwealth Games and the first World Athletics Championships in 1983.

From 1981 he largely relinquished his radio football commentary to commentate for Match of the Day on BBC television and in 1982 was a member of the BBC Television commentary team for the World Cup in Spain his most famous commentaries was the shock 2-1 win by Algeria over the 1980 European Champions West Germany and West Germany's controversial 1-0 win over Austria in fact he did all 3 of West Germany's 1st round group games for the BBC ironically the ITV commentator was Hugh Johns who was at that time ITV's chief Football commentator in the Midlands a role that Alan Parry would later take for Central Sports Special and The Central Match and also he was a member of the BBC's Euro 1984 commentary team alongside John Motson. In 1985, he left the BBC to join ITV, initially as an athletics commentator after the commercial channel won the rights to cover British athletics. However, by the late 1980s, Parry had also become a key football commentator for the network, and in 1990, Parry was Brian Moore's number two at the World Cup – this was a role he would retain until he left the network. As well as covering national football and athletics, Parry was also heavily involved on a regional level, being Central's lead commentator for a number of years. Between 1992 and 1996, the ITV regions held the rights to live coverage of the Football League, and Parry commentated on a live match almost every Sunday for the Central region.

After covering Euro 96 for ITV, Parry left to join Sky TV by which time ITV's athletics portfolio had dwindled almost to nothing (he continued covering what little athletics ITV had left until 1997). Parry has also covered athletics for Sky, but his main role has been as a football commentator. For five years he was the Monday Night Football commentator, before working on the pay-per-view games on PremPlus for four years. In more recent times, Parry has been one of Sky's 'Big Five' commentators – including Martin Tyler, Ian Darke, Bill Leslie. and Rob Hawthorne (now 'Big Four' since Darke left Sky) – who commentate across a wide portfolio of matches in the Premier League, FA Cup, League Cup, Champions League, Europa League, and Football League. Parry has commentated on seven League Cup Finals for Sky. Parry is also the commentator for Wales' live international matches on Sky.

Between 1998 and 2002 he also worked as a football commentator for Talk Radio UK (later rebranded as talkSPORT) and a presenter during the World Cup hosting a phone-in. In the 2002–03 season he presented Saturday afternoon football coverage on Capital Gold.

The 2006–07 season was another busy one for Parry. As well as his core commitment of 1 live match from every weekend of the Premier League, (plus several live matches for overseas viewers for TWI), Parry covered several live matches from the UEFA Champions League, the Football League Championship and the League Cup. His season's highlights were the League Cup Final which he commentated on for the seventh time and the two-legged Champions League semi-final between Manchester United and AC Milan. During the summer he commentated on the Copa América for Sky, including the final.

He, by his own admission, is a supporter of Liverpool which for a period of several years meant that he did not cover any of their matches for Sky. However, during this period he continued to regularly commentate on Liverpool matches on the TWI International feed for overseas Premiership viewers. His "ban" on Liverpool games for Sky seems to have been lifted, with his live commentary of Aston Villa vs. Liverpool on 29 December 2009. Parry has also been involved with Wycombe Wanderers for over ten years now including a spell as a director.

Parry then became commentator of the revived Gladiators on Sky One replacing John Sachs.

When not working for Sky Sports, Parry has been heard commentating Premier League matches for Premier League Productions, a venture of IMG Sports Media who produce, package and broadcast the live production of games for the Premier League for its international broadcast partners. The same productions are also shown domestically for highlights packages on Sky Sports' "Football First" programme.
