= Talksport =

talkSPORT
- London; England
- Broadcast area: Great Britain and Ireland; Global (Premier League games only)
- Frequencies: MW: 1053 kHz and 1071 kHz (Tyne and Wear); 1089 kHz and 1107 kHz (Hampshire and Merseyside); DAB+: 11D/12A (Digital One); DAB+: 6C (Malta); Freeview: 723; Sky (UK only): 0107; Virgin Media: 927

Programming
- Language: English
- Format: Sports

Ownership
- Owner: News UK Broadcasting Ltd; (News UK)
- Sister stations: Talk; Talksport 2; Times Radio; Virgin Radio 80s; Virgin Radio Anthems; Virgin Radio Britpop; Virgin Radio Chilled; Virgin Radio Legends; Virgin Radio Pride

History
- First air date: 14 February 1995
- Former names: Talk Radio UK (1995–2000)
- Former frequencies: 1107 kHz (Lincolnshire)

Technical information
- Licensing authority: Ofcom

Links
- Website: talksport.com

Talksport (styled as talkSPORT) is a British sports radio station owned by News Broadcasting, broadcasting on analogue and digital radio in Britain and Ireland. Its content includes live coverage of sporting events, interviews with the leading names in sport and entertainment, phone-ins and discussion. Talksport, alongside sister station Talksport 2, is an official broadcaster for several sporting contests, including the Premier League and English Football League.

The station originated as a non-sport station, Talk Radio UK, in 1995. It relaunched as Talksport in January 2000. In the UK, Talksport is one of the Independent National Radio licensees, holding the INR3 licence for a speech-based service. It is available primarily on its medium wave frequencies 1089 kHz and 1053 kHz, but also on 1071 kHz and 1107 kHz, DAB digital radio, television platforms Sky, Virgin Media, Freeview, Freesat, and Freely, and via the Internet. Outside the UK and Ireland, Talksport broadcasts live commentary of every Premier League match around the world in multiple languages including English, Spanish and Mandarin.

As of October 2024, the network broadcasts to a weekly audience of 3.5 million listeners in the UK, according to RAJAR.

== History ==
=== Talk Radio era ===
The station was originally and officially launched as Talk Radio UK on 14 February 1995 by American-based Emmis Communications, attempting a talk station with a "brasher" style and with shock jocks compared to BBC Radio 5 Live. It launched with the original Talk Radio Breakfast Show, however, the first live broadcast had been Caesar the Geezer's phone-in which aired the previous night. Other presenters on Talk Radio included Jeremy Beadle, Tommy Boyd, Anna Raeburn, Lorraine Kelly, Gary Newbon, Terry Christian, and Dale Winton.

After quitting the Breakfast Show on BBC Radio 1 FM in April 1995, Steve Wright joined the station, presenting Steve Wright's Talk Show – a live Saturday morning programme. The show was guest-focused and popular at the time, but short-lived, as it moved to BBC Radio 2 in March 1996 and re-launched as Steve Wright's Saturday Show.

By the end of its first year, the shock jocks were dropped, leading to increased ad revenue from advertisers, and the station was bought out by Media Ventures International. Luxembourg based CLT-UFA eventually became the majority owner of Talk Radio. A year later Talk Radio launched a new breakfast show presented by Paul Ross and Carol McGiffin. Former BBC Radio 1 DJ Simon Bates also joined the station, along with James Whale, Ian Collins, and Mike Dickin.

Talk Radio made its first foray into the world of sports radio rights bidding by purchasing from BBC Radio 5 Live the rights to broadcast Football League matches for the 1997–98 season. In addition, the station broadcast its first FIFA World Cup from France in 1998, bringing in the Sky Sports commentary team of Alan Parry and Andy Gray to commentate on the major matches. Dave Roberts covered additional games in France. Talk Radio also acquired up the rights to broadcast Manchester United's matches in the Champions League for the 1998–99 season.

=== Creation of Talksport ===
On 12 November 1998, TalkCo Holdings – whose chairman and chief executive was Kelvin MacKenzie, former editor of The Sun – purchased Talk Radio. This led to a mass clearout of presenters including Nick Abbot, Anna Raeburn, Tommy Boyd and Peter Deeley, with MacKenzie placing an emphasis on a sports-oriented programming schedule, including The Sportszone with Alan Parry, Gary Newbon, Tony Lockwood, Tom Watt, and former Century Radio sports editor Dave Roberts presenting the weekend edition of The Sports Breakfast.

In late 1999, TalkCo, rebranded as The Wireless Group, announced a relaunch of Talk Radio to become the UK's first national commercial sports radio station called Talksport. The relaunch occurred at midnight on 17 January 2000, and was accompanied by the station moving from Oxford Street to a new studio at Hatfields on the South Bank of the River Thames. Now mainly dedicated to sport, the programming lineup was drastically altered, beginning with The Sports Breakfast show; this was followed by a mid-morning motoring show called The Car Guys, with further sports programming in the afternoon and evening.

Most of the station's talk show presenters were ousted at the time, including The Big Boys Breakfast with David Banks and Nick Ferrari, with only James Whale, Ian Collins and Mike Dickin surviving. To complement its new format, Talksport purchased the rights to broadcast Manchester United, Arsenal and Newcastle United matches in the UEFA Champions League, the FA Cup, England football internationals, UEFA Cup, England's winter cricket tours to South Africa, Zimbabwe, Pakistan, and India, British & Irish Lions tours to South Africa and New Zealand, and rights to the Super League, Rugby League World Cup, and world title boxing fights.

The new line-up involved a number of presenters and commentators, including Alan Brazil, Mark Nicholas, Chris Cowdrey, Geoffrey Boycott, Mike Parry, Peter Shilton, Brian Moore, Brough Scott, Tom Watt, Gary Newbon, Ian Darke, Tony Banks, and Alvin Martin.

Approximately 39 hours of non-sports programming still remained on the schedule as of March 2012, including an overnight show hosted by Mike Graham, and George Galloway's The Mother of All Talk Shows on Friday evenings. On 7 March, it was announced that month that Talksport would discontinue or reformat its remaining non-sport programming, considering it an "exciting yet natural next step" for the station, and citing opportunities to provide more coverage of American sport during its overnight lineup. Galloway was dropped, while Graham's show pivoted to primarily discussing sport.

On 25 June 2016, Rupert Murdoch's News Corp announced that it was acquiring the parent Wireless Group company for $296 million. Rupert Murdoch was notable for previously being involved in a phone hacking scandal.

=== Expansion of the Talk brand ===
Sound Digital's successful bid for second national commercial DAB multiplex in 2016 also saw the return of Talkradio, as well as Virgin Radio and the creation of Talksport 2. On 25 June 2016, Rupert Murdoch's News Corp announced that it was acquiring the parent Wireless Group company for $296 million. Since June 2020 it has also produced sports bulletins for Times Radio. In 2022 a televised version of TalkRadio launched on TV.

== Programming history ==
Talksport and Talksport 2 hold exclusive and non-exclusive rights to various sports in the UK.

- May 2001: Talksport secured rights to broadcast Premier League games for the first time. The Radio Authority granted the station permission to broadcast games involving Chelsea, Fulham, and Tottenham Hotspur on their London transmitters only. Later, Talksport also secured similar deals with Everton, Blackburn Rovers, and Manchester City for their transmitters in Greater Manchester, Merseyside, and Lancashire following approval from the Radio Authority. The station also had the ability to split their transmitters in the West Midlands for games involving Aston Villa, but this was never utilised.
- December 2002: Talksport announced plans for the station's first ever music show. An easy listening music show entitled Champagne & Roses with Gerald Harper, was broadcast each Saturday evening. The show was axed after less than six months.
- June 2004: Talksport broadcast their first international football tournament officially. Euro 2004 from Portugal was broadcast live on Talksport with commentary of various matches, including the final, from Jim Proudfoot and Alvin Martin.
- June 2006: the station broadcast the 2006 World Cup, with live match commentary of all 64 matches in Germany. Commentary was provided by Jim Proudfoot, Chris Cooper, Nigel Pearson, Ian Danter, Tim White, and Geoff Peters with punditry from Alvin Martin, Rodney Marsh, Gary Stevens, Jason Cundy, and Micky Quinn.
- August 2006: Former Sky Sports presenter Kelly Dalglish became the first female sports presenter on Talksport, hosting Monday's edition of Kick-Off alongside Gabriele Marcotti and Jason Cundy
- 10 October 2006: Talksport becomes the first national commercial radio broadcaster to win Premier League commentary rights. Talksport wins a package that allows it to broadcast the second choice Saturday afternoon games that kick off at 3pm, with the BBC getting first pick.
- April 2009: Russell Brand and Noel Gallagher were signed by Talksport to present a one-off football talk show on 19 April 2009. It was only a few months after Brand resigned from BBC Radio 2 in the wake of the uproar over the "Sachsgate" affair.
- February 2010: Talksport gained more Premier League football in the latest radio bidding wars. Whilst relinquishing their 3pm package to football newcomers Absolute Radio, they won two packages from BBC Radio 5 Live. They took over the national radio rights to broadcast the late kick-off every Saturday evening from the Premier League (usually kicking off at 5:30pm), and the early Sunday games (before 3pm). This agreement covered the 2010–11 to 2012–13 Premier League seasons
- June 2010: Talksport broadcast the 2010 World Cup, with live match commentary of all 64 matches in South Africa. Commentary was provided by Jim Proudfoot, Ian Danter, Nigel Pearson, John Rawling, and Graham Beecroft with punditry from Alvin Martin, Stan Collymore, Ray Parlour, Bobby Gould, Tony Cascarino, Lawrie Sanchez, and Micky Quinn
- September 2011: Talksport broadcast the 2011 Rugby World Cup, with exclusive commentary of all 48 matches in New Zealand. Commentary was provided by John Taylor, Rupert Bell, John Anderson, Russell Hargreaves and Andrew McKenna with punditry from Brian Moore, Jeff Probyn, David Campese, Chris Sheasby, Michael Owen, Scott Quinnell, Gavin Hastings, and Paul Wallace, with presentation from Mark Saggers and Mike Bovill. Additional reporting from Roger Hughes, David Brady, and Stuart Cameron
- June 2012: Talksport broadcast Euro 2012, with live commentary of all 31 matches in Poland and Ukraine. Commentary was provided by Sam Matterface, John Roder, Nigel Pearson and Ian Danter, with punditry from Stan Collymore, Alvin Martin, Ray Parlour, Matt Holland and Andy Gray with presentation from Adrian Durham, Mark Saggers and Richard Keys.
- July 2012: Talksport secured a joint six-year deal with BBC Radio 5 Live to broadcast live commentaries from the FA Cup, Community Shield and England friendly internationals.
- August 2012: Talksport secure a deal to become an official broadcaster of the Aviva Premiership. The deal enables Talksport to broadcast live commentary of selected matches throughout the season either on-air or online.
- November 2012: Talksport secured exclusive broadcast rights in the UK to the 2013 British & Irish Lions tour to Australia.
- June 2014: Talksport broadcast the 2014 FIFA World Cup, with live commentary of all 64 matches in Brazil. Commentary was provided by Jim Proudfoot, Alan Parry, Gary Taphouse, Nigel Pearson, John Anderson, Andrew McKenna and Richard Connelly with punditry from Stan Collymore, Stuart Pearce, Alvin Martin, Ray Parlour, Matt Holland, Micky Quinn and Alan Curbishley.
- March 2016: Talksport 2 launches, a station dedicated to live sports commentaries and specialist programming.
- May 2016: Talksport and Talksport 2 are awarded the right to broadcast three Premier League UK live audio packages for the next three football seasons, starting with the 2016/17 season.
- June 2016: Talksport and Talksport 2 broadcast Euro 2016, with commentary of all 51 matches. Commentary was provided by Jim Proudfoot, Alan Parry, Gary Taphouse, Ian Danter, Nigel Pearson, John Anderson, Ian Abrahams and Alex Crook, and punditry from Stan Collymore, Stuart Pearce, Joey Barton, Matt Holland, Ray Wilkins, Keith Gillespie, Danny Gabbidon, Michael Gray, Alvin Martin, Danny Higginbotham and Micky Quinn.
- May 2017: Talksport secures exclusive national radio rights to the English Football League. It gives them the ability to broadcast up to up 110 EFL fixtures a season for three years until the end of the 2019/2020 season.
- June 2017: Talksport and Talksport 2 broadcast exclusive commentary of the 2017 British & Irish Lions tour to New Zealand.
- April 2018: Talksport and Talksport 2 secure exclusive broadcast rights to England's winter tours of Sri Lanka and the West Indies.
- April 2019: Talksport and Talksport 2 win three of the four Saturday UK radio rights packages for the Premier League .
- April 2020: Laura Woods becomes the new lead presenter of Sports Breakfast, taking over from Alan Brazil, who moves to two days a week.
- May 2022: Mark Goldbridge, the founder, owner and main host of the football YouTube channel The United Stand becomes presenter of a late night show.
- December 2023: Former Sky Sports presenter Jeff Stelling begins hosting Talksport Breakfast on Mondays and Tuesdays. Alan Brazil begins hosting the breakfast show three days a week instead of two.

== Broadcast ==
Broadcast from London to the UK and Ireland, Talksport is the only British radio station broadcasting sporting discussions and commentaries 24 hours a day, having dropped 39 hours of weekly non-sports content on 2 April 2012. According to the RAJAR audience figures as of June 2026, Talksport's audience is around 3.3 million listeners per week. Talksport 2 has an audience of around 531,000 listeners per week.

The 1089 and 1053 kHz medium wave frequencies were previously used by BBC Radio 1 between November 1978 and June 1994. Talksport's transmission from the high-power Droitwich Transmitting Station on 1053 kHz can also be received in parts of Europe. In December 2024, Talksport announced that seven of its 18 AM transmitters are set to close, resulting in reducing its AM coverage of the UK's population from 92% to 88.9%.

In a number of areas, particularly in areas where the signal from the main 1089 and 1053 kHz transmitters overlap with each other, Talksport operates a number of filler transmitters on different frequencies:

- 1071 kHz: Tyne and Wear
- 1107 kHz: Hampshire, Lincolnshire, Merseyside

Talksport is also transmitted across the UK digitally via DAB digital radio, Freeview, Sky, Virgin Media and Freesat. Talksport is also streamed online and available for any Internet connected devices; however, due to rights restrictions on live coverage, some live sport commentaries are not available online.

Since August 2011, several shows on Talksport have been available on SiriusXM satellite radio in the US and Canada.

During the 2006 FIFA World Cup, Talksport was available on DAB digital radio in some German cities. The station also partnered with Pure to sell a Talksport-branded Pure One digital radio receiver.

== Sister stations ==
=== Talksport 2 ===
The new station launched on 15 March 2016 as part of a Sound Digital's successful bid for second national commercial DAB multiplex. The launch date coincided with the opening day of the 2016 Cheltenham Festival. Former Talksport chief executive Kelvin MacKenzie had proposed a rival sports station as part of Listen2Digital's opposing bid for the second national commercial DAB multiplex.

Talksport 2 is a 24-hour sports station which focuses on a broad range of live sporting action from the UK and around the world and includes rugby, cricket, tennis, golf, football and horse racing, plus US sport. On its first day, Talksport 2 broadcast commentary of India v New Zealand in the ICC World Twenty20, Atlético Madrid v PSV Eindhoven in the Champions League and Indian Wells Masters tennis. On 9 June 2020 talkSPORT 2 switched from DAB Mono to DAB+ Stereo to make room for Times Radio.

In its first two years on air, Talksport 2 acquired broadcast rights to the Aviva Premiership, Super League, ATP World Tour Masters 1000, French Open, ICC World Twenty20, NatWest t20 Blast, Royal London One-Day Cup, Indian Premier League, WGC Match Play, La Liga, MotoGP, ICC Champions Trophy, Premier League, English Football League, Champions League and Europa League.

It has broadcast specialist programming dedicated to the Football League, La Liga, European football, horse racing rugby league, rugby union, boxing, cricket, tennis, NBA, US sport, and golf.

From January 2019, Talksport 2 was re-positioned as a rolling sports news and live sport station.

As of September 2023, the station broadcasts to a weekly audience of 376,000 listeners, according to RAJAR.

=== Talksport International ===
Talksport is the global audio partner of the Premier League, which enables them to broadcast commentary of every Premier League match outside the United Kingdom and Ireland in several languages including English, Spanish and Mandarin.

Talksport International also broadcasts selected fixtures in the FA Cup, League Cup and provides commentaries for Amazon Music's Bundesliga coverage.

As of December 2024, Talksport is available to stream in Australia on digital platforms run by Nova Entertainment.

== Other media ==
- Soccer Bet was a short-lived 68-page weekly magazine which Talksport had hoped would appeal to football fans that enjoyed betting on games. It was designed in a smaller A5 format to make it easy for fans to carry and the launch was backed by a £500,000 promotional campaign. Soccer Bet lasted just two months before it was axed in October 2003 due to poor sales.
- Talksport TV launched in October 2004 platform broadcasting for six hours a day on the Sky Digital television platform aiming to catch listeners who had arrived home from work. The service amounted to little more than the simulcasting of TalkSport's broadcasters and pundits presenting the station's Drive Time and Kick Off programmes. The channel closed in 2005 following the takeover of Talksport by UTV Radio.
- Talk Radio was set to return to the airwaves as a station on DAB digital radio in 2008 after Ofcom awarded a second DAB digital radio national commercial multiplex to the 4 Digital Group consortium led by Channel 4. However, the station never launched after Channel 4 announced that it was abandoning its plans for digital radio stations
- Talksport Magazine launched in May 2008 as a weekly online-only digital publication to extend the station's brand beyond the radio. The magazine was integrated into the newly relaunched Talksport website in 2010
- Sport was targeted at the affluent male and hand distributed in locations across the country including London mainline and tube stations. It was also available at many hotels, gyms and airports

=== Books, DVDs, and games ===
- Talksport Road Trip is a DVD including exclusive footage of the English team and a host of celebrity interviews at the 2006 World Cup released in 2006
- Talksport Legends & Anthems is a three-CD package, released in 2009, featuring 40 tracks by artists such as The Who, The Cure, The Killers, Stevie Wonder, Rod Stewart, and Elton John on two of the discs as well as a bonus CD with out-takes and highlights of Talksport
- Ten Years of Talksport is a book describing the station's history. Originally released in 2009, an updated version of the book including two new chapters was released in 2011
- The Talksport Book of World Cup Banter – Released in 2010, this is a book of football facts about the FIFA World Cup
- The TalkSport Book of Cricket's Best Ever Sledges features contributions from Talksport presenters Darren Gough and Ronnie Irani among others, recounting 'sledging'. Released in 2010
- TalkSPORT Clash Of The Titans is a game created by Mat Dickie (MDickie), It's not available on his download page anymore but can still be downloaded on web.archive.org

== Controversies ==
- June 2000: It was revealed that Talksport had been broadcasting its live commentaries of matches at Euro 2000 from television monitors rather than from each of the stadia, due to the lack of available broadcast rights. Talksport's commentary team included Alan Parry, Jim Proudfoot, Mark Tompkins, Alvin Martin and Frank Stapleton.
- April 2002: Tommy Boyd and his production team were dismissed from Talksport after a call from someone who wanted to shoot the Royal Family went through on air. Boyd went on record that he "did not share the views" of the caller.
- June 2002: Talksport broadcast unofficial coverage of the 2002 World Cup taking place in Japan and South Korea. The station flagged up its inability to broadcast live from the stadia, taking out full page advertisements in national newspapers containing the tag line "It's unauthorised. It's unofficial. And it's brilliant." Jim Proudfoot and Alvin Martin were Talksport's main commentary team from its studios in London.
- February 2003: Talksport received over 200 complaints for giving a platform to the controversial Muslim extremist cleric Abu Hamza. Hamza and his aides were invited into the station to contribute to a religious debate on The James Whale Show, alongside other Christian, Jewish, and Muslim delegates. On the night of the live broadcast, 24 February, a mass of protesters gather outside the station's London studios. Despite this, both Whale and head of programming Bill Ridley defended the station for having invited Hamza onto the programme.
- March 2004: Alan Brazil was dismissed by Talksport when, after spending three days at the Cheltenham Festival, he subsequently failed to show up to present The Sports Breakfast on Friday 19 March. He was reinstated less than three weeks later.
- May 2006: Alan Brazil was reportedly given three months' notice by Talksport after a bust-up with the station's management. Brazil and Talksport management held talks less than two months later, and Brazil signed a new long-term contract with the station.
- June 2006: Alan Brazil got in trouble with Ofcom for referring to Japanese people as "the nips" during the World Cup in Germany
- August 2007: Mike Mendoza and Garry Bushell made derogatory comments about gay people, and the station was subsequently censured by regulator Ofcom.
- May 2008: James Whale was dismissed by Talksport after twice urging listeners to vote for Boris Johnson in the 2008 London mayoral election. The station was subsequently fined £20,000 by Ofcom in December 2008.
- November 2008: Presenter Jon Gaunt was dismissed for repeatedly calling a local councillor a "Nazi". Gaunt has since sought legal action for unfair dismissal, but any potential case has yet to go to court.
- November 2008: Rod Lucas was dropped by Talksport, and the company stated they had "no plans to use him in the immediate future" after the membership list of the BNP which was leaked on a Google blog named him as one of its members. The station clarified that this was not a sacking, for Lucas was only a temporary member of staff. The presenter himself said that his membership of the party was part of a covert research project.
- February 2011: Talksport hired former Sky Sports commentators Andy Gray and Richard Keys (Gray had also been a pundit for the station) a fortnight after the pair were dismissed from Sky Sports for being at the centre of a sexism controversy.
- April 2017: Ofcom upheld complaints against Mike Parry and Mike Graham for comments made on their daytime show the previous December, in which they laughed while telling anecdotes about sexual harassment by former colleagues at the Daily Express. Talksport said in its statement that the two presenters were "laughing at the lack of action" against sexual harassment.
- August 2021: A caller to The Sports Bar said that Tottenham Hotspur owner Daniel Levy would not let Harry Kane leave for free because Levy is Jewish. The remark was not heard on the radio due to a tape delay to avoid offensive callers but was heard on a YouTube simulcast. Talksport apologised and suspended their simulcast until a delay could be enabled.
