= Mike Ingham =

English football commentator and broadcaster

Mike Ingham MBE
- Born: 24 September 1950 (age 75); Cheshire, England
- Occupation: Football commentator
- Employer: BBC Sport

Michael Robert Ingham MBE (born 24 September 1950 in Cheshire) is an English football commentator and broadcaster.

== Early life ==
He grew up in Duffield and Quarndon and attended the Belper School (then The Herbert Strutt School) in Belper. He gained a Bachelor of Law degree.

== Career ==
He began his career working for BBC Radio Derby in 1973, later joining the BBC in London in 1979.

For some years he regularly hosted the Saturday afternoon sports programme Sport on Two, and for five years he hosted BBC Radio's high-profile Saturday teatime Sports Report. Around 1984 he also became a match commentator, working alongside Peter Jones and Bryon Butler. In 1991, he took over from Butler as the BBC's football correspondent.

=== Five Live ===
From 1990, Ingham worked alongside Alan Green as BBC Radio 5 Live's principal commentating pair, working on FA Cup Finals, World Cup finals, European Cup finals and virtually all the biggest matches in Britain and throughout the world, with many of his commentaries also being heard on the BBC World Service. He is noted for his measured, eloquent style, often seen as something of a throwback to earlier days of sports broadcasting. He also commentated on the BBC's coverage of Princess Diana's funeral in 1997.

In 2004, Ingham was promoted as chief football correspondent, becoming renowned with fans for "thinking aloud" when offering his opinion on the football matters of the day.

After the 2014 World Cup, Ingham retired from his role as correspondent and commentator.

== Personal life ==
As of 2014, Ingham resided in Buckinghamshire.

Ingham grew up as a supporter of Derby County F.C.

Ingham was appointed Member of the Order of the British Empire (MBE) in the 2010 Birthday Honours for services to sports broadcasting.
