= Ian Dennis (football commentator) =

English football commentator

Ian Dennis (born 22 October 1971) is a commentator for BBC Radio 5 Live and the station's Chief Football Reporter.

Dennis grew up in West Yorkshire where he attended Ilkley Grammar School. He began working in radio with an unpaid Saturday job at BBC Radio York.

In 1989, he began his professional career working for telephone publishing company Independent Media Services Limited (IMS), in Leeds, working as a football reporter on its TEAMtalk service and as cricket editor, managing an outside broadcast team that included Clive Lloyd, Alan Knott and Ralph Dellor.

IMS proved to be a strong training ground for sports broadcasters and among his colleagues were BBC Match of The Day commentator Guy Mowbray, talkSPORT presenter Adrian Durham and Sky Sports' football reporter Johnny Phillips. He returned to the BBC in 1995 to work for BBC Radio Cleveland, BBC Radio Leeds and BBC Radio Newcastle.

In 1998, he began commentating on Leeds United games for BBC Radio Leeds alongside Norman Hunter. In 2002, he left Radio Leeds to work as a football commentator for Radio 5 Live, for which he has covered four major international tournaments.
