= Maurice Edelston =

English footballer

Personal information
- Full name: Maurice Edelston
- Date of birth: 27 April 1918
- Place of birth: Hull, England
- Date of death: 30 January 1976 (aged 57)
- Place of death: Tilehurst, England
- Position: Inside forward

Senior career*
Years	Team	Apps	(Gls)
1935–1937	Fulham	3	(0)
- Wimbledon
1937–1938	Brentford	21	(6)
- Corinthian
1939–1952	Reading	205	(72)
1952–1953	Northampton Town	40	(17)

International career
1936	Great Britain	2	(0)
1937–1947	England Amateurs	8	(7)
1941–1942	England (wartime)	5	(1)
- * Club domestic league appearances and goals

Maurice Edelston (27 April 1918 – 30 January 1976) was an English footballer, who later became a sports commentator. Born in Hull, England, he was son of the Hull City footballer Joe Edelston. At the age of 18, he played in the football tournament in the 1936 Berlin Olympics for Great Britain.

== Playing career ==
Edelston played league football with Fulham and Brentford (following his father, Joe Edelston, then a coach, to both clubs), non-league football with Wimbledon and Corinthian and in April 1939 he joined Reading (where his father was manager) and played for them successfully as an inside forward until 1952. At international level, he represented Great Britain at the 1936 Summer Olympics, scored seven goals in eight games for England Amateurs and won five wartime caps for England. He finished his playing career at Northampton Town in 1953.

== Broadcasting career ==
Around the late 1950s he went into broadcasting and was a regular BBC radio commentator by 1960. During the 1960s he also commentated for BBC television and Southern Television. Although most of his commentaries were on football, he also covered tennis, especially Wimbledon.

He was a summariser on England's 1966 FIFA World Cup victory as well as the FA Cup Final in 1967 and 1968. He commentated on the event from 1969 to 1975. He reached his peak around the late 1960s and early 1970s, when he was broadcasting almost every week, covering European finals and England matches, as well as a number of league title deciders (Arsenal's victory at Tottenham Hotspur in 1971, and Wolves' defeat of Leeds which handed the title to Derby County in 1972). He also co-wrote the books Masters of Soccer and Wickets, Tries and Goals.

By the mid-1970s, his career was somewhat in decline as the emergence of Alan Parry was denying him the chance to commentate on matches such as England vs Scotland in 1975, and the controversial European Cup final in which Bayern Munich beat Leeds United four days later. However, he continued to cover tennis during the summer of 1975 and was still broadcasting regularly when he died suddenly from a heart attack in Tilehurst on 30 January 1976, aged 57.

== Legacy ==
A library at the Reading Blue Coat School is named after him, as is an award that Reading present to the outstanding schoolboy in their Academy.
