= Peter Jones (broadcaster) =

Welsh radio presenter (1930–1990)

Peter Jones (7 February 1930 – 2 April 1990) was a Welsh broadcaster, best known as a sports commentator on BBC Radio in the United Kingdom, although many of his commentaries were also broadcast internationally on the BBC World Service. He frequently worked alongside Maurice Edelston, Bryon Butler, Alan Parry and, latterly, Alan Green and Mike Ingham.

== Career ==
He was educated at Swansea Grammar School and Queens' College, Cambridge, where he read Modern Languages. He started his teaching career at Kimbolton School and subsequently taught French and coached the First XI Football Team at Bradfield College. His career as a broadcaster began in 1965 after a chance meeting with Maurice Edelston, who lived in nearby Reading. In his early years he commentated on group matches in the 1966 World Cup, held in England. At the 1970, 1974, 1978, 1982 and 1986 he was the main commentator on the World Cup, covering the final. Along with his regular weekly football commentaries, Jones covered almost every major football event from the late 1960s until his death, including the FA Cup Final of 1968, the replay (but not the first match) in 1970 and all finals from 1971 to 1989 with the exception of 1982 when he covered the Papal Visit. He described victories for English clubs in the European Cup finals of 1968, 1977, 1978, 1979, 1980, 1981, 1982 and 1984, and in 1985 he gave an eloquent description of the Heysel Stadium disaster.

As a presenter rather than a commentator, he fronted the BBC's coverage of Wimbledon during the 1970s and 1980s, and frequently presented the BBC's Saturday afternoon radio sports coverage (Sports Service until 1970, Sport on Two from then until 1990) from the late 1960s to the late 1980s.He described the Olympic Opening Ceremony in 1976, 1980,1984 and 1988. He was the BBC's regular commentator on swimming for many years, covering the sport at many Olympic and Commonwealth Games, often with Anita Lonsbrough. He occasionally commentated on cricket, and often covered the Oxford and Cambridge Boat Race which turned out to be his last time commentating on a sporting event. As a serious broadcaster with a mellifluous voice and a deep sense of gravitas, he was regularly called upon to describe the opening and closing ceremonies at events such as the Olympic Games and World Cup, and also covered non-sporting events such as the wedding of Prince Charles to Lady Diana Spencer in 1981, and that of Prince Andrew to Sarah, Sarah Ferguson in 1986. He also lent his talents to coverage of the State Opening of Parliament.

Almost unrivalled for his ability to paint word pictures and capture the excitement of an occasion, Jones was still regarded as a great broadcaster in the late 1980s, despite the rise of younger, brasher commentators who did not share his Standard English accent. He was deeply affected and saddened by the Hillsborough disaster in 1989, which he witnessed from the commentary box, and gave an emotional description of the memorial service for the victims of the disaster, reciting the words of "You'll Never Walk Alone". He continued to broadcast regularly, but it has been claimed that he never fully recovered emotionally and personally from the experience of witnessing the Hillsborough disaster, and on 31 March 1990 he collapsed on the BBC launch during his commentary on the Oxford and Cambridge Boat Race. He was hospitalised at the end of the race, but died some 36 hours later. He was universally mourned as a great broadcaster and, perhaps, the last of a line, for soon after his death sports broadcasting in the UK underwent a revolution with the arrival of Sky TV and of BBC Radio 5 (later BBC Radio 5 Live), taking a more informal and, arguably, more populist and less eloquent style.

== Personal life ==
Peter Jones was married with two sons; one of them, Stuart Jones, was football correspondent for The Times when Peter Jones died in 1990. Later Stuart Jones became Tennis Correspondent for The Times in the 1990s; he was diagnosed with throat cancer, moved to Barbados, and died in 2013.

== Opinions ==
"Peter was an old school charmer and an inspirational colleague for all aspiring broadcasters such as I was when I joined BBC Radio Sport in 1984. In my opinion, nobody before or since has ever broadcast with greater descriptive brilliance than Peter did on the day of the Hillsborough disaster. He was absolutely exceptional, and is still missed 20 years after his death." - John Rawling.

== See also ==
- BBC Radio
- BBC World Service
- Hillsborough disaster
- The Times
