= Alan Green (broadcaster) =

British sports commentator

- Born: 25 June 1952 (age 73); Belfast, Northern Ireland
- Occupation: Sports commentator
- Known for: BBC radio football commentary

Alan Green (born 25 June 1952) is a Northern Irish former sports commentator, mainly on football but also on golf, rowing and the Olympic Games.

Green was one of BBC Radio 5 Live's most senior football commentators and was a winner of a Sony Radio Academy Award for Sports Broadcaster of the Year. He is noted for his forthright style of football commentary and has been involved in several controversies and disputes with managers including Alex Ferguson and Sam Allardyce.

He also worked briefly in the MLS as Atlanta United play by play lead announcer for Fox Sports South and Fox Sports Southeast.

== Career ==
Alan Green was born in Belfast, and attended Methodist College Belfast. After gaining an honours degree in modern history from Queen's University Belfast, he worked in local newspapers until he moved to the BBC in 1975 as a news trainee with the ambition of becoming a TV news producer. Green presented current affairs on both radio and television in Northern Ireland, before he moved to Manchester, joining BBC Radio's sport department.

Green's first World Cup as a BBC commentator was in 1982, and in 1986 he made his debut covering the FA Cup Final as the junior commentary partner to Peter Jones. He returned to the Cup final in 1988, and following Jones' untimely death, he covered every FA Cup final from 1990 to 2016, missing only 2010 due to ill health. In 1989, Green was present at the Hillsborough disaster with Jones. In a 2009 radio programme marking the 20th anniversary of the disaster, he spoke of his bitterness that justice had been denied for the 96 people who died at Hillsborough.

Green's forthright commentary style has often divided opinion among radio listeners. He has won the admiration of some listeners for his honest assessments of football games and for his uncompromising opinions.

Green has disputed the notion that the English Premier League is the greatest in the world. In 2013, he wrote an article in which he said: "The Premier League I see week in, week out, isn't remotely as good as it thinks it is." In the article for the Belfast Telegraph, Green criticised what he called "woeful defending", "selfish, oafish behaviour" and "the underwhelming, overpaid footballers that populate the Premier League."

In an interview with The Observer in 2009, Green said of his career as a sports commentator: "Apart from one time in 1984, I've never applied for a television job." Green said that he told a BSkyB executive, who had floated the idea of him moving from radio to the satellite channel, that he is too outspoken to work for Sky TV. The Sky executive implored Green to "always accentuate the positive". Green told him that his role as a commentator was "to tell the truth, not to act as a propagandist."

Green debuted as a commentator on BBC 1's Match of the Day on 13 September 2014, covering highlights of the Premier League game between West Brom and Everton. He later covered Steven Gerrard's last match for Liverpool at Anfield.

In July 2015, Green featured as the narrator on the Channel 4 programme Lookalikes.

He was the lead play-by-play announcer for American team Atlanta United (MLS) for Fox Sports South and Fox Sports Southeast for their inaugural 2017 season.

His BBC 5 Live contract was not renewed following the 2019–20 football season.

=== Disputes with football managers ===
Green had a long-standing dispute with Alex Ferguson following an incident in which Green said on air that he was "learning not to believe the propaganda that comes out of the Manchester United manager's office". Green felt that he had been deliberately misled by Ferguson giving him inaccurate team news the day before a match. In 2009, Green said of Ferguson: "He either bullies or frightens. It's the way he exerts his control over the media. He would be a fantastic propaganda minister. He knows how to manipulate and some of my colleagues take it in."

In 2006, Green was banned from Bolton Wanderers' Reebok Stadium after accusing manager Sam Allardyce of playing "ugly" football. Following Allardyce's departure to Newcastle United, the club invited Green back. In an article for The Belfast Telegraph in 2010, Green wrote: "Am I alone in thinking Sam Allardyce must be the most arrogant football manager that's ever lived?" In January 2013, Green criticised Allardyce's style of play at West Ham United, which he described as "hitting the ball long and high to a big man up front."

=== Other controversies ===
In 2004, Green was censured by Ofcom after he made a comment live on-air about Manchester United's Cameroonian midfielder Eric Djemba-Djemba speaking pidgin English with the referee. Green said that Djemba-Djemba was saying "me no cheat" to the referee. A listener complained that it was inappropriate to suggest a black man was unable to speak grammatical English. Green had previously described Manchester City's Chinese defender Sun Jihai as wearing shirt "Number 17 – that'll be the Chicken Chow Mein, then" during a live radio broadcast.

In 2005, Green had a dispute with Everton fans after he wrote an article in which he suggested that manager David Moyes, "instead of raising expectations after Everton's fourth-place finish the previous season, should suppress them." Green's article led to him receiving some death threats.

In 2007, he commentated on a match between Everton and Reading at Goodison Park. Film star Sylvester Stallone was paraded on the pitch and Green joked about whether Stallone's limousine would still have wheels when he returned to it. This prompted an official complaint to the BBC by Liverpool City Council, upset at his stereotypical views about car crime in the city.

Green is reported to have fallen out with a number of his broadcasting colleagues over the years. In 2009, he was reported to have had a rift with former fellow BBC broadcaster Mark Saggers, that surfaced in on-air exchanges. Saggers left the BBC to join rival Talksport at the end of the 2008–09 English football season.

In June 2016, Green stated that he would boycott the 2018 FIFA World Cup in Russia due to the "horrendous atmosphere" he had experienced on previous trips to Russia.

== Personal life ==
Green lives in Somerford, Cheshire with his wife Brenda, whom he married on 29 March 1980.
