= Brian Moore (football commentator) =

English commentator and presenter (1932–2001)

- Born: 28 February 1932; Benenden, Kent, England
- Died: 1 September 2001 (aged 69); Orpington, Greater London, England
- Occupations: Football commentator and presenter
- Spouse: Betty Cole (m. 1955)
- Children: 2

Brian Baden Moore (28 February 1932 – 1 September 2001) was an English football commentator and television presenter who covered nine World Cups and more than twenty FA Cup finals.

== Early life ==
Moore was born in Benenden, Kent. After passing his eleven-plus, he was educated at Cranbrook School, Kent, which was also the school of fellow commentators Peter West and Barry Davies.

== Career ==
Moore began his career in newspapers. His first job, in 1954, was as a sub-editor on the monthly World Sports magazine. He subsequently worked for The Exchange Telegraph for two years before moving to The Times in 1958.

=== Radio ===
In 1961, Moore became a football commentator and presenter on BBC Radio, and the corporation's first football correspondent in 1963. Moore, Alan Clarke and Maurice Edelston were the commentators for BBC Radio when England won the 1966 World Cup. Moore also covered the FA Cup Final from 1964 to 1967, and European Cup Winners' Cup victories for Tottenham Hotspur in 1963 and West Ham United in 1965, and Celtic's European Cup victory in 1967.

=== London Weekend Television and ITV ===
Shortly after that Moore moved to London Weekend Television, which was preparing for its launch on the ITV network in 1968. Brought to the station by head of sport Jimmy Hill, Moore remained with LWT and ITV Sport over the next three decades.

In 1970, Moore was the host of ITV's World Cup coverage, when Moore and Hill presided over a month of panel-based coverage. Malcolm Allison, Derek Dougan, Paddy Crerand and Bob McNab were nicknamed the "Midnight Cowboys" by the press due to the late-night kick off times. In subsequent years, Brian Clough also appeared frequently with Moore as a pundit on ITV.

Although primarily a commentator, Moore also presented a number of other ITV Sport shows, including Saturday lunchtime preview On the Ball, Sunday highlights show The Big Match and Midweek Sports Special. He also presented and produced Big League Soccer in the 1970s and 1980s, a bespoke highlights show produced by Thames Television for international sydnication. In the late 1970s he made a six-part documentary series for ITV, Brian Moore Meets..., with guests including Kevin Keegan, Niki Lauda and Björn Borg.

During thirty years at ITV, Moore commentated on European trophy wins by Arsenal, Liverpool, Nottingham Forest, Aston Villa, Tottenham Hotspur, Manchester United, Everton and Aberdeen. Moore's commentary of the winning goal in Aston Villa's 1982 European Cup Final win over Bayern Munich is displayed on a giant banner across the North Stand of Villa Park:

Shaw, Williams, prepared to venture down the left. There's a good ball played in for Tony Morley. Oh, it must be! It is! Peter Withe!!

Moore also covered the FA Cup Final for ITV every year from 1969 to 1988, and again in 1998, as well as six European Championships between 1972 and 1996, missing 1984 due to England's absence.

Moore presented ITV's coverage of the FIFA World Cup in 1970, 1974, 1978 and 1982. In 1986, he presented the coverage from London for most of the tournament before flying out to commentate on the final. From 1990 to 1998, he commentated throughout the tournament.

He retired as a commentator in 1998 after France's 1998 World Cup final victory at the Stade de France against Brazil, but continued to broadcast, presenting an interview programme for Sky Sports in 1999, and hosting programmes for BBC Radio 5 Live and Talksport. His time on Talksport included hosting Inside the Boardroom, where club chairmen and directors joined him in the studio to answer phone-in questions from the public.

In retirement, he joined the team of readers for Bromley Talking Newspapers, making weekly recordings for the blind of stories from the local papers.

== Personal life ==
Moore married Betty Cole in 1955. They had two sons.

Moore was a lifelong supporter of Gillingham and served as a director at the club for seven years. A stand at the club's Priestfield Stadium is named after him.

Moore suffered from serious heart problems in his later life and twice underwent life-saving surgery for blocked arteries. After the first health scare, he became a regular churchgoer and a committed Christian. He died at the age of 69 on 1 September 2001, the day that England beat Germany 5–1 in Munich during the qualifying stages of the 2002 World Cup.
