= Sky Sports =

British television channels

- Logo used since 2026
- Country: United Kingdom
- Broadcast area: United Kingdom; Ireland
- Headquarters: Sky Campus, Isleworth, London, England

Programming
- Picture format: 1080p MPEG-4 HDTV 4K

Ownership
- Owner: Sky Group (Comcast)
- Sister channels: List of Sky UK channels

History
- Launched: 27 March 1990; 36 years ago
- Replaced: Eurosport (1989–1991)
- Former names: The Sports Channel (1990–1991)

Links
- Website: sky.com/tv/sports skysports.com

Availability

Streaming media
- Sky Go: Watch live (UK and Ireland only)
- Now TV: Watch live (UK and Ireland only)
- Virgin TV Go: Watch live (UK only)

Sky Sports is a group of British subscription sports channels operated by the satellite pay television company Sky Group (a division of Comcast), and is the dominant subscription television sports brand in the United Kingdom and Ireland. It has played a major role in the increased commercialisation of British sport since 1991, and has sometimes played a large role inducing organisational changes in the sports it broadcasts, most notably when it encouraged the First Division to break away from the Football League to form the Premier League in 1992.

Sky Sports Main Event, Premier League, Football, Cricket, Golf, F1, Action, Tennis and + are available as a premium package on top of the basic Sky package. These services are also available as premium channels on nearly every satellite, cable and IPTV broadcasting system in the United Kingdom and Ireland. Sky Sports News, Sky Sports Racing and Sky Sports Mix are all provided as part of basic packages. The Sky Sports network is managed by Jonathan Licht.

== History ==
=== 1989–1991: Predecessors ===
Sky Television launched on 5 February 1989 and one of its four channels was Eurosport, which it co-founded with the European Broadcasting Union. However, in 1991, Eurosport was the subject of a complaint by the competitor Screensport, who argued the effect of restricting and distorting competition in the sports market and Sky pulled out of the venture. Also in the same year, it was sold to the TF1 Group and merged with Screensport two years later.

British Satellite Broadcasting operated The Sports Channel, which launched on 27 March 1990. It broadcast part-time hours, especially during the week, and it therefore timeshared with The Computer Channel, which broadcast in the early mornings when it was off-air. That same year (2 November), BSB merged with Sky Television to form British Sky Broadcasting.

=== 1991–1998: Beginnings ===
The Sports Channel
- Country: United Kingdom
- Broadcast area: United Kingdom; Ireland

Programming
- Language: English

Ownership
- Owner: British Satellite Broadcasting (1990); British Sky Broadcasting (1990–1991)

History
- Launched: 27 March 1990; 36 years ago
- Closed: 20 April 1991; 35 years ago
- Replaced by: Sky Sports

The Sports Channel was renamed Sky Sports on 20 April 1991 and began broadcasting to Sky viewers via the newly launched Astra 1B satellite on that date. It continued to transmit on BSB's Marcopolo satellite. The channel was sold as one of the major draws of the Sky system and initially aired sports such as rugby and golf before acquiring rights to German and Italian league football (both previously carried over from the Sports Channel). The channel was initially encrypted. It was broadcast free-to-view but an analogue VideoCrypt decoder was required to watch the channel. Since VideoCrypt decoders were only officially available within the United Kingdom, this measure was intended to prevent viewing of the service outside the United Kingdom and Ireland.

However, it was following the formation of the Premier League for the 1992/93 football season, believed to have been assisted by the promise of higher television payments, that Sky Sports became well known. By bidding £304 million, BSkyB beat ITV to acquire the exclusive live Premier League football broadcasting rights for the United Kingdom and Ireland for a five-year period. In doing so, they had taken live top-flight English league football from terrestrial and free-to-air television for the first time. At this point, from 1 September 1992, Sky Sports became a monthly subscription channel and was sold either on a standalone basis, or at a reduced price if taken with Sky's movie channels.

On 19 August 1994, a secondary channel called Sky Sports 2 was launched, although it initially only aired at weekends. On 1 November 1995, Sky launched a classic sports service called Sky Sports Gold, however it was ceased broadcasting after only a year on the air. On 16 August 1996, Sky launched Sky Sports 3, and soon after on 1 September the original channel was renamed to Sky Sports 1. This meant that Sky could accommodate a substantial new set of rights that it had recent acquired, which included the English Football League, the League Cup and Scottish football. On 1 September 1997, Sky Sports 2 became a full-time service.

=== 1998–2017: Digital era ===
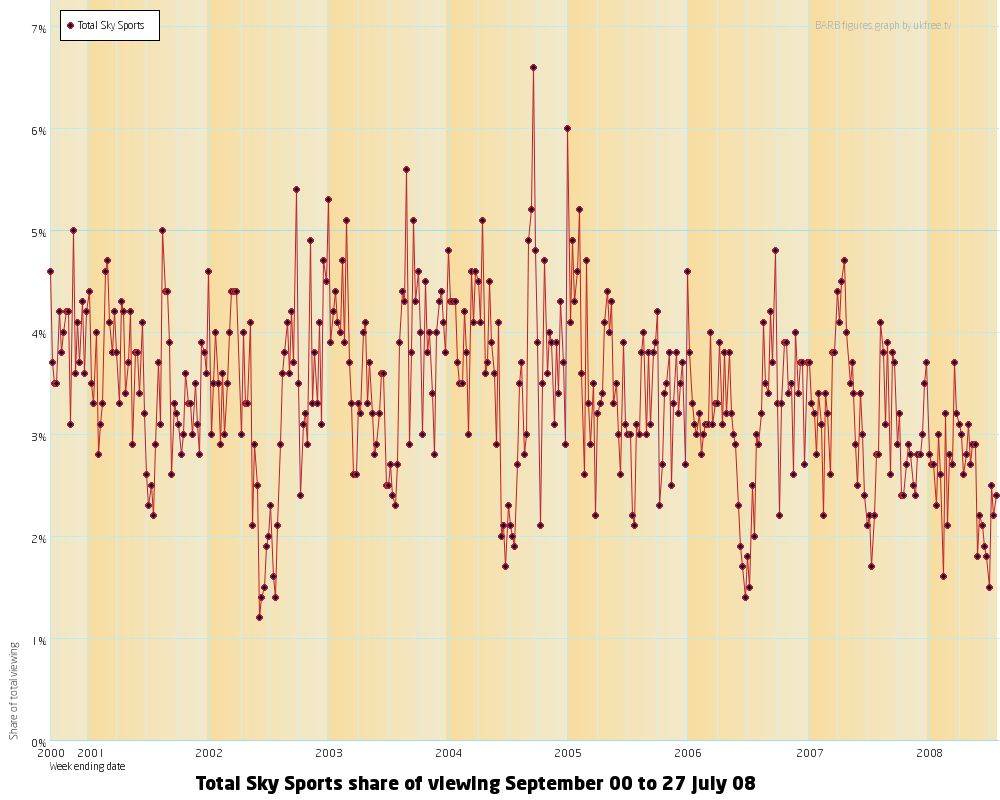
Sky Sports share of viewing 2000–08

Sky Sports former logo

With the launch of the Sky Digital satellite platform on 1 October 1998, Sky Sports launched Sky Sports News, a channel carrying rolling sports news coverage, followed by Sky Sports Xtra (later branded as Sky Sports 4 since 2010, then Sky Sports Golf since 2017) in August 1999.

During a Premier League match between Arsenal and Manchester United on 22 August 1999, Sky Sports launched an interactive television service known as Sky Sports Active via the digital platform, allowing viewers to watch matches with access to additional on-screen statistics, and a choice of alternate camera angles and replays. Sky also expected to extend the interactive services to other sports for the following year.

On 25 January 2011, Sky Sports' Premier League football coverage was at the centre of controversy when footage emerged of long serving presenters Andy Gray and Richard Keys making comments perceived as sexist where Gray was sacked over the comments, and fellow reporter Andy Burton was suspended by Sky due to his involvement in the sexist comments made about a female assistant referee Sian Massey, which also involved Gray and Keys. However, unlike Gray and Keys, Burton later returned to his regular duties at Sky.

On 29 July 2011, it was announced that Sky Sports had acquired rights to Formula One racing from 2012 through 2018, with the BBC to share free-to-air rights to roughly half of the events and have highlights rights for the remainder. Sky subsequently announced that it would introduce a new channel dedicated specifically to its coverage, Sky Sports F1, which would air practices, qualifying and advert-free coverage of each race; the service was made available at no extra charge to all Sky high-definition subscribers, regardless of whether they were a Sky Sports subscriber. Sky extended its contract from 2016 to last through 2024; beginning in 2019, Sky became the exclusive broadcaster of all F1 races excluding the British GP which will also be broadcast on the free-to-air Channel 4 (who also hold rights for all the highlights races).

On 12 August 2014, Sky launched a new channel called Sky Sports 5, which would be dedicated primarily to European football, including UEFA European Championship qualifiers, La Liga and Eredivisie.

On 24 August 2016, Sky launched Sky Sports Mix, a new channel designed to offer a shop-window of content from the full range of Sky Sports networks to those who are not subscribers. On Sky, the channel is included as a basic service with all plans, and was also available on certain Virgin Media packages.

=== 2017–present: Channel re-alignment and expansion ===
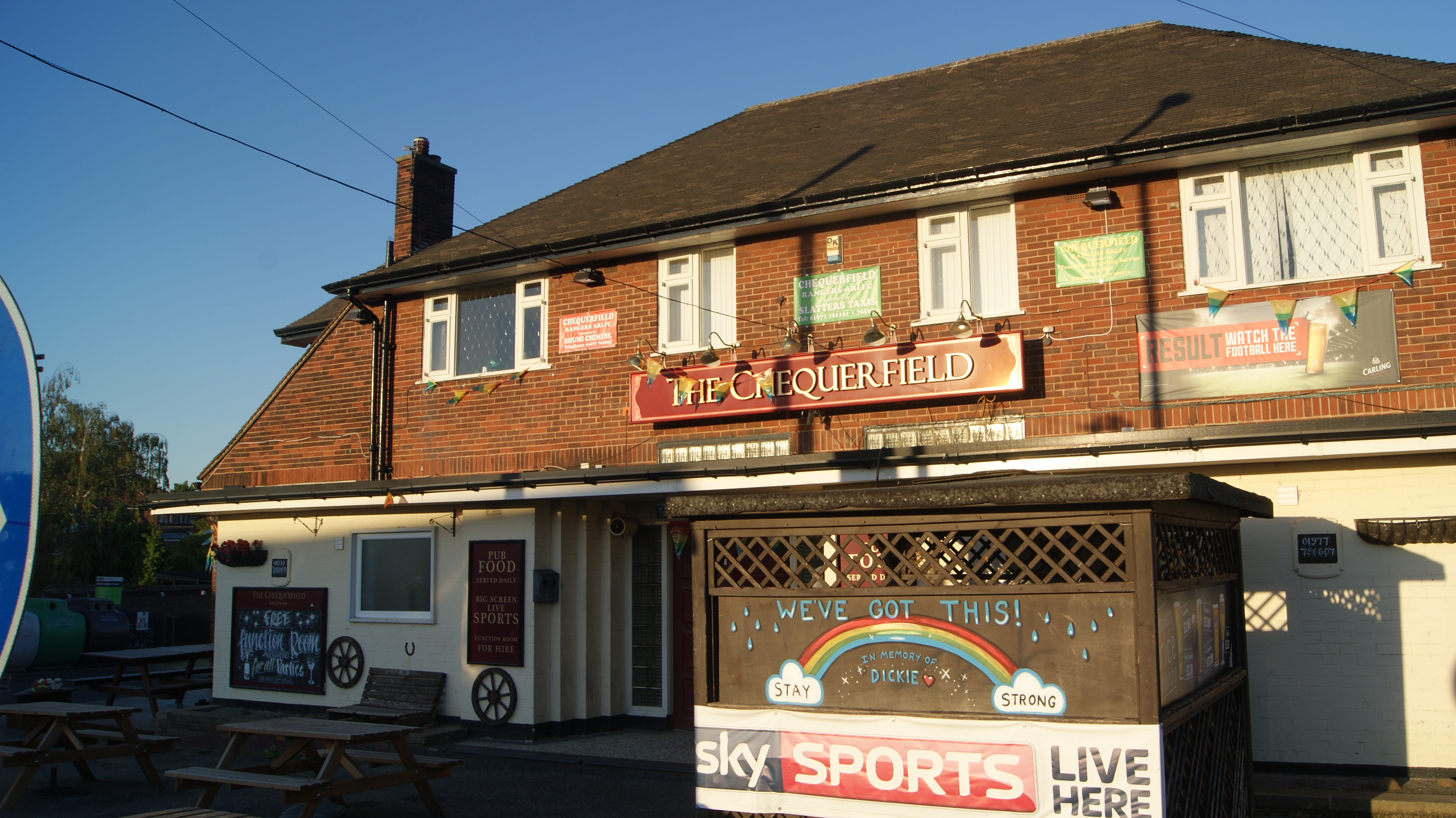
Pubs which have Sky Sports often display it, such as this one in Chequerfield, Pontefract, West Yorkshire.

On 18 July 2017, Sky re-aligned its sports channels, dropping the numbered services in favour of dedicated channels devoted to their core sports properties including cricket, Formula One, golf, and two football channels (with one specifically dedicated to the Premier League), and three channels dedicated to general sports coverage. In addition, Sky announced that it would revise the pricing structure of the channels to make them more attractive to viewers; Sky customers can purchase up to three of the channels on an a la carte basis, or the entire bundle. Sky Sports Mix continued to air selected programming from across the channels as part of Sky's basic service. On Sky's Now TV service, the entire Sky Sports service continues to be available through the timed pass system. The availability and packaging of the new service varies on other providers.

The American NBC Sports division became a sibling of Sky Sports following Comcast's acquisition of Sky plc and on 29 January 2019, Sky and sister American pay television network NBCSN partnered on coverage of the transfer deadline (NBC holds the Premier League rights in America), and the network later announced that it would add an hour-long simulcast of the Sky Sports News channel to its weekday morning line-up beginning 4 March. For the PGA Tour's 2019 Players Championship, Sky Sports Golf trialled similar synergies with its new sister Golf Channel. For the 2019–20 season, NBC began more extensive on-air integration of Sky Sports resources into its American coverage of the Premier League, including adding Sky's studio programmes to its "Premier League Pass" subscription service, adoption of on-air presentation reminiscent of Sky, and originating coverage from Sky's studio during the opening weekend.

In May 2021, Jonathan Licht became the managing director of Sky Sports.

In May 2023, Sky renewed its rights to the EFL through 2028–29 for £935 million, announcing that it planned to televise over a thousand matches per-season via linear television and streaming.

In May 2024, Sky announced "Sky Sports+", a new streaming platform that will house its expanded EFL and tennis rights, among other properties; the platform will be capable of streaming up to 100 concurrent programmes. Sky also announced that one of its channels would also be rebranded under the Sky Sports+ name. The new service launched on 8 August and the channel which was rebranded was Sky Sports Arena.

In November 2025 Sky Sports launched a new TikTok channel called Sky Halo, intended to promote women’s sport to younger audiences. Within a few days of its launch the channel was taken down following widespread criticism. Coverage in outlets including BBC News, CNN and The Guardian reported that viewers had condemned some of the content as sexist and out of touch with the way women’s sport is usually presented. Marketing Week later described the project as a failed brand launch and argued that the tone and creative execution of the channel had been badly misjudged.

== Channels ==
The Sky Sports network has thirteen main channels (with a fourteenth channel for BT TV):

Name	Content		Notes
Name	Dedication	Other	Notes
Sky Sports Main Event	Flagship events (Football, F1, boxing, rugby, cricket, etc.)		Simulcasts Sky Sports News outside live events
Sky Sports Premier League	Premier League	Women's Super League	Live, ancillary coverage and documentaries
Sky Sports Football	Non-Premier League football (EFL Championship, the Scottish Premiership, European league football)		Live, ancillary coverage and documentaries
Sky Sports Cricket	Cricket (domestic and international)		
Sky Sports Golf	Golf		
Sky Sports F1	Formula One racing	General motor racing (Formula 2, Formula 3, IndyCar Series)	Sky Sports Darts replaces this channel for the duration of the PDC World Darts Championship.
Sky Sports Action	Alternative sport types (Rugby, netball, boxing, the NFL, darts)		
Sky Sports Arena	Alternative sport types (Rugby, netball, boxing, darts)		
Sky Sports+	Alternative matches (EFL, Super League (rugby), tennis, netball, boxing, darts, golf, cricket, NFL (Some regular season games), NBA)		
Sky Sports Tennis	Tennis (ATP Tour, WTA Tour, US Open)		
Sky Sports Racing	Horse racing	Greyhound racing	Available with Sky's basic TV package (Sky Signature).
Sky Sports Mix	General	Supplementary programming from across the network	Available with Sky's basic TV package (Sky Signature).
Sky Sports News	News across all of sport		Available with Sky's basic TV package (Sky Signature).
Sky Sports Extra	Premier League games (alternative matches to Sky Sports Main Event)		For BT TV customers

=== Temporary services ===
Sky occasionally gives one of their channels a temporary rebrand to coincide with a sports event. Examples of this include:

- Sky Sports Ashes: To coincide with the 2013 Ashes series, Sky Sports 2 was renamed as Sky Sports Ashes on 30 June until 31 August 2013. As well as covering the Ashes, the dedicated cricket channel also featured the Women's Ashes, domestic cricket, various magazine and review shows. The practice was repeated for the 2015 Ashes series and also for the 2019 Ashes series.
- Sky Sports Ryder Cup: From 18 September to 2 October 2014, Sky rebranded Sky Sports 4 as Sky Sports Ryder Cup. The channel was dedicated to the coverage of the 2014 Ryder Cup from Gleneagles. It repeated from 26 September to 5 October 2016 for the Ryder Cup for that year. In 2018, Sky Sports Golf was rebranded to Sky Sports Ryder Cup to bring coverage of the 2018 tournament. The channel will return on 20 September 2021 after a 4-year hiatus.
- Sky Sports Darts: In recent years, Sky Sports has launched Sky Sports Darts for the duration of the PDC World Darts Championship. The channel mixes live coverage with replays of the most recent sessions and classic moments from the tournament's history. Sky Sports Darts was first seen for the 2015 World Darts Championship as a rebrand of Sky Sports 3. It returned for the 2016 event when Sky Sports F1 was temporarily renamed Sky Sports Darts instead, while in 2017 it was Sky Sports 3 that was rebranded again. After this, Sky Sports Arena was rebranded as Sky Sports Darts for all subsequent events, until the 2025 Championship when it returned to Sky Sports F1.
- Sky Sports World Cup: From 14 February to 29 March 2015, Sky rebranded Sky Sports 2 as Sky Sports World Cup. The channel was dedicated to the coverage of the 2015 Cricket World Cup, from Australia and New Zealand.
- Sky Sports The Open: During their first live broadcast of golf's Open Championship from 11 to 18 July 2016, Sky Sports 1 rebranded as Sky Sports The Open. From 17 to 24 July 2017, Sky Sports 4 was rebranded Sky Sports The Open, and would be replaced by Sky Sports 4's replacement, Sky Sports Golf. Sky Sports The Open returned in 2018, 2019 and 2021 during the week in which the Open was held.
- Sky Sports The Players: From 8 to 14 May 2017, Sky rebranded Sky Sports 4 as Sky Sports The Players. The channel was dedicated to the coverage of the 2017 Players Championship. This was repeated on Sky Sports Golf for the 2018, 2019 and 2021 competitions, and also the 2020 competition prior to it being cancelled due to the Coronavirus pandemic.
- Sky Sports US Open: From 11 to 19 June 2018, Sky rebranded Sky Sports Golf as Sky Sports US Open, dedicated to the coverage of the 2018 US Open golf tournament.
- Sky Sports USA: From 3 January to 5 February 2019, Sky Sports Action was rebranded as Sky Sports USA, with a focus on the National Football League (highlighted by the playoffs leading up to Super Bowl LIII) and National Basketball Association coverage (highlighted by the NBA Global Games series at The O2 Arena in London), as well as shoulder and archive programmes.
- Sky Sports Cricket World Cup: From 31 May 2019 to 14 July 2019, Sky Sports Cricket was rebranded as Sky Sports Cricket World Cup. The channel was dedicated to the coverage of the 2019 Cricket World Cup in England and Wales.
- Sky Sports Netball: From July 2019 to August 2019, Sky Sports Mix was rebranded as Sky Sports Netball. The channel was dedicated to coverage of the 2019 Netball World Cup.
- Sky Sports NFL: In August 2020, to mark its 25th season of its broadcast rights to the NFL, it was announced that Sky Sports Action would be rebranded annually as Sky Sports NFL, lasting from early September through the Super Bowl in February. It was stated that at least five games per-week would air on the channel, including all Monday Night Football and Thursday Night Football games. This has been repeated in subsequent years.
- Sky Sports The Lions: From 17 July 2021 to 10 August 2021, Sky Sports Action was rebranded as Sky Sports The Lions. This channel was dedicated to coverage of the 2021 British & Irish Lions tour to South Africa. It returned again from 28 June to 2 August 2025 for the 2025 British & Irish Lions tour to Australia.
- Sky Sports The Hundred: From 21 July 2021 to 23 August 2021, Sky Sports Cricket was rebranded as Sky Sports The Hundred. This channel was dedicated to coverage of the inaugural 2021 season of The Hundred. This returned since the 2022 season.
- Sky Sports Tennis: From 28 August to 11 September 2023, Sky Sports Arena was rebranded as Sky Sports Tennis so that the channel could provide non-stop live and recorded coverage of the 2023 US Open. The channel was launched as a 24-hour channel on 11 February 2024.

=== Sky Sports Racing ===
Sky Sports Racing is the only channel not wholly owned by Sky, although purchased majority control of it in 2017. The channel was founded in 2000 as At the Races by the Go Racing consortium, a partnership of Channel 4, Sky and Arena Leisure plc (owner of Ascot Racecourse, and acting on behalf of a further 27 out of the 59 British racecourses) in July 2004. Following its high-profile collapse (and Channel 4 removing itself from the consortium) the network – now purely a joint venture between Sky plc and Arena Leisure – focuses on horse racing from the United Kingdom, Ireland, North America and Germany, showing many live races and related shows. The station is "affiliated" with various betting companies, since gamblers are generally the sport's main audience, and its pictures, provided by satellite link provider SIS, are also commercially distributed to betting shops across the country.

On 1 January 2019, At the Races relaunched as Sky Sports Racing; the relaunch includes wider availability and heavier integration with the remaining Sky Sports channels, the relocation of production facilities to Sky Campus in Isleworth from their former base at SIS's facilities in Milton Keynes, and availability in high-definition. The network also acquired rights to fixtures from the Ascot Racecourse.

=== Defunct channels ===
==== PremPlus ====
PremPlus was a pay-per-view channel dedicated to airing live Premier League football. It was launched on 18 August 2001, showing 40 pay-per-view Premier League matches. The main presenter on PremPlus was Marcus Buckland with former Arsenal manager George Graham providing punditry. The channel was called Premiership Plus from 2001 to 2004, before being shortened to the later PremPlus for the beginning of the 2004–05 season. PremPlus closed down after the last match of the 2006–07 season after Setanta Sports obtained a third of the Premier League rights for 2007–10. This left Sky with only 92 live matches, meaning a pay-per-view service was unsustainable. An internet television service named Now TV was launched in 2012, offering a non-contract subscription to Sky Sports thus making the service a part spiritual successor to PremPlus.

==== Sky Sports News Radio ====
Sky Sports News Radio was a British online radio station broadcasting sports news, results and information 24 hours a day. It was a sister service to the television channel Sky Sports News HQ.

The station was launched in June 2010 and broadcasts online and via digital platforms from the Teamtalk studios in Leeds. It originally broadcast from 8.00am to 6.00pm, expanding to a full 24-hour schedule in August 2010 to coincide with the start of the 2010–11 football season. The station was initially only available to Sky Sports subscribers, but became free to all listeners when its sister television channel was removed from Freeview. The station can also be listened to via the Sky Sports apps and third party platforms such as TuneIn Radio and The Pure Lounge.

News reports were sourced from the Sky Sports News newsroom, Sky News Radio and information was shared with SkySports.com, based in the same office. The station's managing editor was Mark Chesworth. The station closed in September 2014.

== Technological advances ==
=== Sky Sports channels in HD ===
Sky Sports Main Event HD launched on 22 May 2006 as Sky Sports HD, and airs live all sports screened in HD like cricket, Premier League and English Football League as well as English Premiership, Super League Rugby and among others. The 2008 Ryder Cup was also screened in HD.

In July 2006, Sky Sports HD2 launched on Sky channel 409, at the same time, the original HD channel was renamed Sky Sports HD1 and moved to channel 408, with Sky Sports News switching to channel 405. There was also a HD version of PremPlus, called PremPlus HD, which broadcast on Sky channel 483 until the football season ended. It was briefly branded Sky Sports HDX and used to broadcast other Sky Sports content in HD, before it ceased broadcasting.

HD broadcasts of rugby league's Super League began from the start of the 2007 season in February 2007. Super Bowl XLI marked the first NFL broadcast in HD in the UK; additional NFL games in HD have since been phased in. Monday Night Football, Thursday Night Football, Thanksgiving Day games and the NFL Playoffs were shown in HD from 2008.

Sky Sports HD3 launched on 17 March 2008, to coincide with WWE's first UK HD broadcast. The channel broadcast a large quantity of WWE and golf.

Sky Sports HD4 launched on 29 April 2010.

Due to an Ofcom review of premium services, Sky Sports HD1 and HD2 launched on the Virgin Media platform on 2 August 2010. This marked the first time that Sky's HD programming was shown via a rival service. Smallworld Cable added Sky Sports HD1 and HD2 in the first quarter of 2012. UPC Ireland added Sky Sports 1 HD and 2 HD along with Sky Sports News HD on 16 August 2012.

Sky Sports News HD launched on 23 August 2010. It was rebranded as Sky Sports News HQ HD on 12 August 2014 along with the standard channel.

On 1 March 2012, the HD channels were given a minor rebrand, with the 'HD' moving to the end of the channel names, for example Sky Sports 1 HD instead of Sky Sports HD1. Sky Sports F1 HD launched on 9 March 2012.

Sky Sports 2 HD was also rebranded to 'Sky Sports Ashes HD' in the same move used for the standard channel on 30 June until 31 August 2013. Sky Sports 4 HD was also rebranded to 'Sky Sports Ryder Cup HD' in the same move used for the standard channel on 18 September 2014 until 2 October 2014.

Sky Sports 3 HD, Sky Sports 4 HD and Sky Sports F1 HD launched on Virgin Media on 15 July 2014. Sky Sports 5 HD launched on 12 August 2014 as well as being added on Virgin Media. Sky Sports 3, 4 and 5 HD launched on Virgin Media Ireland on 15 October 2014.

On 1 January 2015, Sky Sports News HQ HD, along with Sky News HD were added on Virgin.

=== Sky 3D ===
Sky Sports has made a number of high-profile broadcasts available on its 3D television service. The first sports broadcast on Sky 3D was the Manchester United vs. Chelsea Premier League game on 3 April 2010. But as of 25 September 2014, the future of Sky 3D looked in serious doubt as Sky announced they will not be airing a Premier League game for the 2014–15 season. The channel closed on 9 June 2015.

==== 3D broadcasting tests ====
On 31 January 2010, the match between Arsenal and Manchester United was shown in 3D in around 30 pubs around the United Kingdom. The special glasses were seen being tried by Sir Alex Ferguson and Arsène Wenger, and the commentators and the studio presenters mentioned of this being a world premiere live sports 3D presentation several times.

=== 4K UHD ===
On 13 August 2016, selected Sky Sports events became available to watch in UHD for the first time. 124 Premier League matches were broadcast in the 2016–17 season along with every race, qualifying session and practice in the 2017 Formula One season and England cricket's Test match series against South Africa in summer 2017. Customers need to be Sky Q 2TB multiscreen customers who subscribe to Sky Sports pack in order to receive UHD broadcasts.

==== 4K broadcasting tests ====
It was widely reported that Sky used the West Ham United v Stoke City Premier League game on 31 August 2013 as an internal production test for broadcasting 4K/Ultra HD picture.

In the "Sky Views Blog", Barney Francis as the managing director stated that, although it was only viewed internally, the test has been key in helping Sky evaluate whether it will start broadcasting in 4K:

We saw enough in this test event to know that live sport in UHD has real potential. The broadcast also demonstrated the capability of our satellite platform, which is ideally placed to continue supporting high-bandwidth video. That said, we've still much more to learn, particularly about how to make full use of UHD from a live production perspective.

Sky later tested 4K by broadcasting a whole week of Ryder Cup in 4K format.

It was later reported that Sky would launch their own 4K set top box to broadcast sporting events in mid-end of 2015.

==== Permanent UHD channel ====
On 27 July 2022, Sky Sports launched a UHD channel for Sky Sports Main Event.

In March 2023 The Sky Sports F1 UHD channel was launched in time for the start of the 2023 season. The channel is also available on Virgin Media.

== Programming ==
Sky owns exclusively United Kingdom and Ireland or rights to a number of sports, most notably the ones listed below. They also transmit a large range of other sports. Some of the BSB's Sports Channel programming were the FA Cup, US Open tennis, and American football from the NFL.

Many of the BSB Sports Channel's rights packages, such as those for the FA Cup, Wimbledon and Test cricket, were acquired in tandem with the BBC.

=== Football ===
==== Premier League ====
Sky Sports showed 128 live Premier League matches each season until 2024–25. These games were played on Friday nights, Saturday evenings and nights, Sundays and Monday nights, for which Sky broadcasts the dedicated programmes Friday Night Football (FNF), Saturday Night Football (SNF), Super Sunday and Monday Night Football (MNF). Games that Sky Sports broadcast outside these time slots have the programme title, Premier League Live. David Jones is the presenter of Super Sunday and Monday Night Football and Kelly Cates is the presenter of Friday Night Football and Saturday Night Football. Both presenters take it in turns to present Premier League Live. The later (16:30) Super Sunday game, is usually billed as the "main event" of that Premier League matchweek.

The main studio pundits include Gary Neville, Jamie Carragher, Jamie Redknapp, Roy Keane, Micah Richards, Karen Carney, Daniel Sturridge, Shay Given and Michael Dawson. Sky Sports' lead commentators include Peter Drury, Rob Hawthorne and Bill Leslie with Ian Crocker, Daniel Mann, Gary Weaver and Seb Hutchinson appearing occasionally, while co-commentary is regularly provided by Gary Neville, Jamie Carragher, Alan Smith, Andy Hinchcliffe and occasionally, Don Goodman and Lee Hendrie. Sky Sports usually utilise a standard two-person commentary team across the Premier League coverage, however, on bigger games, a three-person commentary team of Peter Drury, Gary Neville and Jamie Carragher is used. Patrick Davison, David Craig and Emma Saunders are the main reporters on the Premier League coverage. Saunders also presents from pitch-side from the ground at which the earlier game is held on Super Sunday coverage.

It was announced in December 2023 that the number of matches that Sky will televise from the start of the 2025–26 season will almost double, increasing to a minimum of 215 games per season. The increase is partly due to Sky taking over the midweek rounds previously shown by Amazon and by showing all ten fixtures from the final day of the season. This arrangement will be in place until the end of the 2028/29 season.

===== Game of the Day/Premier League Replay =====
- Game of the Day: On-air at 8.30pm every Saturday evening with the full 90 minutes of a match selected from the day's 3.00pm kick-offs.
- Premier League Replay: On-air at 10.30pm every Saturday with a choice of extended highlights of every Premier League game played that day except matches shown live on TNT Sports. Viewers on the Sky Digital and Virgin TV platforms can choose extended highlights of up to eight games. Viewers who do not use the interactive service will see 30 minutes of highlights from one match.

The lead commentators that appear on Game of the Day and Premier League Replay, consist of a variety of freelancers including: Peter Drury, Jim Proudfoot, Joe Speight, Ian Darke, Gary Taphouse, Nigel Adderley, Mark Scott and Jonathan Beck. Whilst the co-commentators include, Tony Gale, Keith Andrews, Andy Walker, Garry Birtles, Davie Provan, Don Goodman, David Phillips, Danny Gabbidon, Terry Gibson, Iain Dowie and Efan Ekoku. These are the same feeds as IMG use for the Premier League Productions World Feed to broadcast to international audiences. Games that air on TNT Sports, that Sky Sports show highlights clips of, across their digital and interactive platforms, feature Premier League Productions World Feed commentary.

==== English Football League ====
From the start of the 2024–25 season, Sky broadcast over 1000 matches per season, including 328 Championship, 248 League One, 248 League Two, all 15 play-off, all 93 EFL Cup, all 127 EFL Trophy matches respectively. This included a live stream every match of the opening weekend of the 2024/25 season live, including games scheduled for 3pm. David Prutton, Michelle Owen and Julian Warren are the presenters of the EFL coverage. Gary Weaver, Daniel Mann, David Stowell, Pien Meulensteen, Ian Crocker, Seb Hutchinson, Rob Palmer and Gary Taphouse are the main commentators. The main studio pundits and co-commentators include Andy Hinchcliffe, Keith Andrews, Don Goodman and Lee Hendrie. Freelance pundits, Clinton Morrison, Jobi McAnuff and Curtis Davies also occasionally appear in the studio and in co-commentary respectively. Jonathan Oakes, David Craig and Guy Havord are the reporters.

As of the 2018/2019 season, Sky gained rights to show all midweek Championship fixtures across interactive and digital platforms. This means that whilst one game is being shown on the main channel, Sky Sports Football, alternative channel, Sky Sports Action, the red button and the Sky Sports app shows coverage of numerous other games on at the same time, with commentary. Commentators of these games include, Guy Havord, Andy Bishop, Rob Palmer, Ian Crocker, Gary Taphouse, David Stowell and Phil Blacker with former La Liga commentators, Kevin Keatings, Jon Driscoll and Dominic Johnson also commentating. Tony Gale, Lee Hendrie and Danny Gabbidon work as summarisers.

==== EFL Cup ====
From the 2024–25 season, Sky Sports broadcast all Carabao Cup matches. Mark Chapman is the main host of EFL Cup games. Punditry is provided by select guests associated with the clubs involved, but in the latter stages of the competition, pundits from the Premier League output are used on coverage too. Rob Hawthorne, Bill Leslie, Gary Weaver, David Stowell, Ian Crocker, Pien Meulensteen, Daniel Mann, Seb Hutchinson and Rob Palmer are the lead commentators throughout the competition with the co-commentators including, Gary Neville, Jamie Carragher, Alan Smith, Andy Hinchcliffe, Don Goodman and Lee Hendrie. The main reporter on EFL Cup games is Guy Havord however Jonathan Oakes and David Craig are occasionally called upon to cover.

==== EFL Trophy ====
Sky Sports broadcast every EFL Trophy game since the 2024/2025 season. The same personnel that appear on Sky's EFL coverage, also appear on EFL Trophy coverage.

==== Scottish Professional Football League ====
Sky Sports owns live rights to the Scottish Professional Football League, showing 48 games per season. SPFL Coverage is presented by Eilidh Barbour, alongside regular studio pundits, Kris Boyd, James McFadden and Chris Sutton. The likes of Neil Lennon, Stuart Lovell, Neil McCann, Ryan McGowan and Stiliyan Petrov also appear as non-regular studio pundits.

The lead commentator of the SPFL coverage is Ian Crocker, and he is regularly joined by either James McFadden or Chris Sutton as co-commentator. If there is a SPFL double header, Gary Weaver would also appear as a lead commentator. Luke Shanley is the main match reporter or occasionally, Gordon Duncan and Adam Binnie also reports.

As of the 2025/26 season, Sky Sports shares SPFL broadcast rights with Premier Sports, ending the exclusivity Sky used to have over the broadcasting rights.

==== NIFL Premiership ====
In February 2017, Sky Sports gained rights to show five NIFL Premiership games per season until the end of the 2021/2022 season, as well as live coverage of the Northern Ireland Football League Cup Final. Presentation comes from freelance presenter, Graham Little who hosts games, on-site, at the ground. Commentary comes from Northern Ireland national game reporter, Paul Gilmour.

==== Bundesliga ====
On 5 August 2021, Sky Sports acquired the rights to Germany's Bundesliga and Supercup for the following four seasons.

==== Women's Super League ====
On 21 June 2021, Sky Sports won the live broadcast rights to the FA Women's Super League for the next three seasons through to 2024. As part of the deal, Sky Sports would broadcast 35 games per season. The presenter of the WSL on Sky Sports is Caroline Barker, and the main studio pundits are Karen Carney and Casey Stoney. Lead commentators comes from Seb Hutchinson and Jacqui Oatley alongside co-commentators Sue Smith and Siobhan Chamberlain. Lynsey Hooper is the pitchside reporter.

In October 2024 a new deal with Sky Sports and the BBC for the broadcast rights for the rest of the decade was announced, extending Sky Sports' coverage of the competition until 2030.

==== Supplementary programming ====
===== Soccer AM =====
Launched on 20 August 1994, Soccer AM, is a Saturday morning talk show presented by John "Fenners" Fendley and ex-footballer Jimmy Bullard, with a focus on humorous analysis of British football, largely but not exclusively based around the Premier League. The programme ended its run on 27 May 2023, the day before the end of the 2022–23 Premier League season.

===== Soccer Saturday =====
Launched in 1992, Soccer Saturday is a live updates show, broadcast on Saturdays during the football season. The programme updates viewers on the progress of association football games in the United Kingdom on Saturday afternoons. The current host is Simon Thomas, who had replaced Jeff Stelling at the start of the 2023–24 season. Stelling had hosted the programme since 1998. The lead studio pundit is, Paul Merson. Other studio pundits include Tony Cottee, Iain Dowie, Alan McInally, Matt Murray, Glen Johnson, Clinton Morrison and Sue Smith. Regular reporters include Bianca Westwood, David Craig, Dickie Davies, Rob Palmer, Johnny Phillips, Neil Mellor, Peter Smith, Peter Stevenson, Stuart Jarrold, Paul Walsh, Simon Watts, Faye Carruthers, Tony Colliver, Jonathan Beales, Steve Jackson, Mike Jones, Russ Taylor, Mark Benstead, Charles Paterson, Frank Gilfeather, Andy Walker, Stuart Lovell, Davie Donaldson and John Temple. A midweek programme with the same format, fronted by Julian Warren, is also broadcast when there are a number of major games taking place, such as on UEFA Champions League nights, and is called Soccer Special. Warren also hosts Soccer Saturday when Thomas is unavailable.

===== Sunday Supplement =====
Launched in 1999, Sunday Supplement was a Sunday morning magazine style pundit show, presented by Neil Ashton from 2012 to January 2020, when Jacqui Oatley took over until the show ceased to air in August 2020. Originally Jimmy Hill's Sunday Supplement, but after a revamp in 2007, Hill was dropped.

===== Goals on Sunday =====
Goals on Sunday was a Sunday morning highlights show, presented by Chris Kamara and Ben Shepherd. The show was axed in 2020.

==== Football presenters ====
Name	Coverage
Eilidh Barbour	SPFL, EFL
Caroline Barker	Women's Super League, EFL
Kelly Cates	Premier League Live, Friday Night Football and Saturday Night Football
Mark Chapman	Premier League Live, Super Sunday, EFL Cup
David Jones	Premier League Live, Saturday Night Football, Super Sunday, Monday Night Football
Michelle Owen	EFL
Julian Warren	EFL
Emma Saunders	EFL
David Prutton	EFL

==== Lead commentators ====
Commentator	Coverage	Notes
Peter Drury	Premier League, EFL Cup, England National Games	Sky Sports' lead Premier League commentator (Most major matches), Trophy Lift commentator
Rob Hawthorne	Premier League, EFL Cup, Republic of Ireland National Games	Sky Sports' Number 2 Premier League commentator (Some major matches)
Bill Leslie	Premier League, EFL Cup, EFL (occasional), Wales National Games	Sky Sports' Number 3 Premier League commentator
Daniel Mann	Premier League (occasional), EFL, Championship Play-Off Final, EFL Cup, England Under-21 Internationals	Sky Sports' lead EFL commentator
Ian Crocker	Premier League (occasional), EFL, SPFL, Scotland National Games	Sky Sports' lead SPFL commentator
Gary Weaver	Premier League (occasional), EFL, EFL Cup, SPFL (occasional), Women's Super League (occasional), EFL Trophy, Northern Ireland National Games	
Seb Hutchinson	Premier League, EFL Cup, EFL (occasional), Women's Super League	
Pien Meulensteen	Premier League (occasional), EFL (occasional), EFL Cup, EFL Trophy, Women's Super League	
David Stowell	EFL, EFL Cup, Women's Super League (occasional), EFL Trophy	
Rob Palmer	EFL, EFL Trophy	
Gary Taphouse	Premier League (occasional), EFL, Women's Super League (occasional)	
Paul Gilmour	NIFL Premiership	
Jacqui Oatley	Women's Super League	
Jon Driscoll	International Matches	

==== Studio pundits/co-commentators ====
Name	Nat.	Role(s)	Coverage
Kris Boyd	(Scotland)	Studio pundit	SPFL
Jamie Carragher	(England)	Studio pundit and co-commentator	Premier League, EFL Cup and England National Games
Siobhan Chamberlain	(England)	Co-commentator	Women's Super League
Curtis Davies	(England)	Studio pundit	EFL, EFL Cup and EFL Trophy
Michael Dawson	(England)	Studio pundit	Premier League, EFL and EFL Cup
Don Goodman	(England)	Studio pundit and co-commentator	Premier League, EFL, EFL Cup and EFL Trophy
Lee Hendrie	(England)	Studio pundit and co-commentator	Premier League, EFL, EFL Cup and EFL Trophy
Andy Hinchcliffe	(England)	Studio pundit and co-commentator	Premier League, EFL, EFL Cup and Women's Super League
Roy Keane	(Republic of Ireland)	Studio pundit	Premier League and EFL Cup
Jobi McAnuff	(Jamaica)	Studio pundit	EFL, EFL Cup and EFL Trophy
James McFadden	(Scotland)	Studio pundit and co-commentator	SPFL
Gary Neville	(England)	Lead studio pundit and co-commentator	Premier League, EFL Cup and England National Games
Jamie Redknapp	(England)	Studio pundit	Premier League, EFL Cup and England National Games
Micah Richards	(England)	Studio pundit	Premier League and EFL Cup
Alan Smith	(England)	Co-commentator	Premier League, EFL Cup and England National Games
Sue Smith	(England)	Co-commentator	Women's Super League
Casey Stoney	(England)	Studio pundit	Women's Super League

==== Reporters ====
Reporter	Nat.	Coverage
Patrick Davison	(England)	Premier League and England National Games
Emma Saunders	(England)	Premier League and EFL
Jonathan Oakes	(England)	EFL, EFL Cup and EFL Trophy
David Craig	(England)	Premier League, EFL and EFL Cup
Luke Shanley	(Scotland)	SPFL and Scotland National Games
Paul Gilmour	(Northern Ireland)	Northern Ireland National Games
Geraint Hughes	(Wales)	Wales National Games
Lynsey Hooper	(England)	Women's Super League

=== Cricket ===
Sky was the first broadcaster to show live coverage of a complete overseas tour involving England when they toured the West Indies in 1990. This was originally shown on Sky One acquired the rights to show home international series involving England, South Africa, New Zealand and West Indies at various times as well as showing almost every England overseas tour and ICC tournaments such as the Cricket World Cup, Champions Trophy and T20 World Cup. Sky also shows extensive coverage of county cricket, with over 60 live games each season involving every county in all competitions. The Kia Super League was added to Sky's coverage of Women's cricket in 2017 when it shows eight matches from the 2017 Women's Cricket Super League. In 2018, Sky Sports won the rights off BT Sport to broadcast all 34 games of the Caribbean Premier League from the 2018 season which continued into the 2019 and 2020 seasons. In 2015, Sky Sports won exclusive UK rights to broadcast the Indian Premier League for three years taking the rights from then broadcaster ITV4 and in 2018, these rights were renewed on a multi-year deal. Star Sports, the global distributor of IPL coverage then unexpectedly cut their contract for the 2019 season, however, these rights were reinstated from the 2020 season onwards. In 2020, while 2021 IPL season all 60 matches also shown on Sky, Sky won rights to show all games from the inaugural season of the Lanka Premier League. As of 2021, Sky Sports have agreements with Cricket South Africa and the Pakistan Cricket Board, to show live Tests, ODIs and T20Is from these countries. As part of the deal with the Pakistan Cricket Board, Sky won rights to show the Pakistan Super League for three years until 2024. Having not won the rights to the Test series of England's tour of India in 2021, Sky Sports gained the rights to the white ball series of this tour and subsequently, for the remainder of 2021, will broadcast all Indian home games.

Sky Sports first started broadcasting Home England Tests in 1999. In a joint deal with terrestrial broadcaster Channel 4, it began showing one home Test each summer plus one-day internationals (Channel 4 were the senior broadcast partner). This arrangement continued until 2006, when Sky Sports' flagship live coverage of England's home test series began. The previous year, it was announced by the ECB that it had awarded Sky exclusive coverage of all of England's home tests, one-day internationals and Twenty20 Internationals including the 2009 Ashes with highlights on Channel 5 produced by Sunset + Vine who produced Channel 4's coverage. The ECB have since renewed Sky Sports' deal until 2024 with BBC taking over the rights held by Channel 5 and picking up additional rights. The Fifth Test vs India at the Oval, (commencing 15 August 2014) was the 200th England Test shown live on Sky Sports.

Test cricket coverage is presented by Ian Ward alongside a commentary team of Michael Atherton, Nasser Hussain, Nick Knight, Ebony Rainford-Brent and occasionally, Sir Andrew Strauss. Ward himself also appears in the commentary box regularly. Michael Atherton usually conducts the post-match presentation after each game. Along with Sky's team, a guest commentator from the touring side also contributes to the coverage. In recent series, these have included, Dinesh Karthik (India), Simon Doull (New Zealand), Ian Bishop (West Indies), Ricky Ponting (Australia) and Wasim Akram (Pakistan). Highlights are broadcast in a prime time slot each evening.

Ian Ward fronts all of England's home ODI and T20 International games alongside commentators, Michael Atherton, Nasser Hussain, Nick Knight, Mark Butcher, Ebony Rainford-Brent and occasionally, Kevin Pietersen, Kumar Sangakkara and Stuart Broad along with other international guest analysts from the touring side. Ward also contributes to commentary.

Overseas series involving England are presented from the London studio by Nick Knight alongside the likes of Mark Butcher, Ebony Rainford-Brent, Dominic Cork, Niall O'Brien, Stuart Broad and many other guests. Ian Ward, Michael Atherton and Nasser Hussain contribute to coverage from where England would be touring, as they would usually join the host broadcaster for these series.

Sky Sports also have international cricket rights to matches played in India, Pakistan and South Africa. The match coverage is taken from the host broadcasters from these countries.

Coverage of county cricket is presented by Nick Knight or Mark Butcher. Commentary comes from Charles Dagnall, Ebony Rainford-Brent, Lydia Greenway, Adam Collins, Niall O'Brien, Dominic Cork and Alex Tudor, along with many other guest commentators. Knight and Butcher also contributes to commentary.

Coverage of women's cricket on Sky Sports is presented by Nick Knight, Mark Butcher or Mel Jones alongside commentators, Charles Dagnall, Adam Collins, Ebony Rainford-Brent, Lydia Greenway and Charlotte Edwards. Knight, Butcher and Jones also contribute to commentary.

In 2021, the inaugural season of The Hundred commenced with Sky Sports broadcasting every single game live. Sky Sports unveiled a new presentation team for coverage of The Hundred. Joining Sky's existing presentation and commentary team, were Andrew Flintoff, Kass Naidoo and Zainab Abbas, as presenters, and Simon Doull, Daren Sammy, Darren Gough and Tammy Beaumont, as analysts and commentators.

Sky Sports' additional cricket programming includes:

- The Cricket Debate
- Cricket Classics
- Masterclasses
- In the Zone

==== Presenters ====
Name	Coverage
Ian Ward	Home Tests, ODIs, T20Is, Overseas England Tours and The Hundred
Nick Knight	Overseas England Tours, County Cricket, Women's Cricket and The Hundred
Mark Butcher	County Cricket and Women's Cricket
Andrew Flintoff	The Hundred
Kass Naidoo	The Hundred
Zainab Abbas	The Hundred
Mel Jones	Women's Cricket

==== Studio analysts and commentators ====
Name	Role	Coverage
Ian Ward	Lead commentator	Home Tests, ODIs, T20Is, Overseas England Tours and The Hundred
Nick Knight	Lead commentator	Home Tests, ODIs, T20Is, Overseas England Tours, County Cricket and The Hundred
Michael Atherton	Lead studio analyst and commentator	Home Tests, ODIs, T20Is, Overseas England Tours and The Hundred
Nasser Hussain	Studio analyst and commentator	Home Tests, ODIs, T20Is, Overseas England Tours and The Hundred
Mark Butcher	Studio analyst and commentator	Home Tests, ODIs, T20Is, Overseas England Tours, County Cricket, Women's Cricket and The Hundred
Ebony Rainford-Brent	Studio analyst and commentator	Home Tests, ODIs, T20Is, Overseas England Tours, County Cricket, Women's Cricket and The Hundred
Sir Andrew Strauss	Studio analyst and commentator	Home Tests
Charles Dagnall	Studio analyst and commentator	County Cricket, Women's Cricket and The Hundred
Lydia Greenway	Studio analyst and co-commentator	County Cricket, Women's Cricket and The Hundred
Mel Jones	Studio analyst and lead commentator	Home Tests, Women's Cricket and The Hundred
Kevin Pietersen	Studio analyst and lead commentator	Home Tests, ODIs, T20Is and The Hundred
Stuart Broad	Studio analyst and co-commentator	Home Tests, ODIs, T20Is, Overseas England Tours and The Hundred
Kumar Sangakkara	Studio analyst and co-commentator	Home Tests, ODIs, T20Is and The Hundred
Niall O'Brien	Studio analyst and co-commentator	Overseas England Tours, County Cricket and The Hundred
Adam Collins	Lead commentator	County Cricket and Women's Cricket
Alex Tudor	Studio analyst and co-commentator	County Cricket and The Hundred
Dominic Cork	Studio analyst and lead commentator	Overseas England Tours and County Cricket
Charlotte Edwards	Studio analyst and co-commentator	Women's Cricket

=== Rugby union ===
In 2014, Sky Sports extended their already long-term deal with the RFU to continue showing England Internationals (outside of the Six Nations) exclusively live up until the end of the 2019–20 season. This includes their autumn test matches at Twickenham and their annual Spring fixture. Furthermore, Sky broadcast live England Saxons, under 18, under 20 and England Women. As a part of the deal with the RFU, Sky also had the rights to broadcast at least 11 games per season from the RFU Championship.

Sky holds the rights to broadcast New Zealand, Australia, South Africa tests and The Rugby Championship. This meant that, aside from Italy, France, Wales and Scotland, Sky held the right to show all Tier 1 nations home Tests (outside the Six Nations Championship). Highlights of England Internationals are shown on BBC Sport and Ireland Internationals are shared with RTÉ Sport.

Sky also held the rights to tour matches by England, Ireland, Scotland and France, to South Africa, Australia and New Zealand (as a part of their contract with SANZAAR until 2018 and from 2022).

Sky Sports broadcast two live matches each weekend from the Top 14. Sky's contract with SANZAAR also allowed them to show live matches from the Super Rugby competition, as well as the Currie Cup and Mitre 10 Cup.

Rugby union coverage on Sky Sports is fronted by Alex Payne, James Gemmell and Rupert Cox. With guests including Will Greenwood, Sean Fitzpatrick, Michael Lynagh, Paul Wallace, Scott Quinnell, Pat Sanderson, Marcelo Bosch, Johan Ackermann, Maggie Alphonsi, Rory Lawson, Shane Horgan, Stuart Barnes, Ieuan Evans, Dewi Morris, Frankie Sheahan, Scott Hastings and Alan Quinlan. Lead commentators include Miles Harrison, Rupert Cox, Johnnie Hammond and Martin Gillingham.

=== Rugby league ===
The power of television over sport can perhaps be best portrayed by the change of rugby league from a winter sport to one played during the summer months under the banner of Super League. These changes caused great controversy when they were introduced in 1996, yet they have been seen as positive and as having an impact even greater than the broadcaster has had with football.

The sport is now seen as being in a healthy state with two live matches from the Super League every week fronted by Brian Carney, who is joined pitch-side or in the studio by pundits – usually two of: Jon Wilkin, Sam Tomkins, Jamie Jones-Buchanan and Jodie Cunningham. Dave Woods, Mark Wilson, Fraser Dainton, Stuart Pyke or Rod Studd lead the commentary team alongside a summariser, usually one of: Kyle Amor, Jon Wells, Terry O'Connor, Barrie McDermott, Jon Wilkin and Courtney Winfield-Hill. Jenna Brooks is the usual pitch-side reporter, but is occasionally replaced by Jon Wells or Danika Priim.

Live Super League broadcasts routinely rank amongst the top ten most watched programmes in a week on Sky Sports. As of the 2024 season, Sky Sports broadcast every Super League match live. This was announced in October 2023 as part of a new three-year contract, extending the partnership with the Super Leaguebeyond 30 years. All six matches in each round are shown live, with two of these being exclusive to Sky Sports. These two matches have additional TV cameras and a studio team; the remaining four matches use six TV cameras and are presented solely by the commentary team. Non-exclusive matches are shown via the Sky Sports + Red Button service, as well as the new dedicated streaming platform SuperLeague+. Non-exclusive matches are sometimes shown on free-to-air television via BBC Sport.

In addition to coverage of the men's game, Sky Sports show three matches live from the Women's Super League per season, in addition to two play-off matches and the Grand Final. Sky Sports also broadcasts the Wheelchair Super League Grand Final.

Between 2012 and 2021, Sky Sports aired Challenge Cup matches alongside BBC Sport: usually, Sky Sports' coverage included one match in the fourth and fifth rounds and two of the quarter-finals – with highlights of the Semi-Finals and Finals which are shown live exclusively on the BBC.

Coverage of the Australia and New Zealand's National Rugby League returned to Sky Sports in 2018 on a five-year contract. The deals includes selected matches from the Telstra Premiership plus the NRL Grand Final as well as the State of Origin series, Pacific Tests, Auckland Nines and the All Stars Match. This deal was later extended until the end of 2027.

=== Motorsport ===
Sky Sports broadcasts major motorsport events, this includes:

- Formula One – since 2012, all race weekends exclusively live except British GP from 2019 to 2024.
- Race of Champions, Goodwood Festival of Speed, FIA Formula 2, FIA Formula 3 and IndyCar all shown on Sky Sports F1.
- Extreme E – for the inaugural 2021 series shown on Sky Sports Action (or Arena) and Sky Sports Mix.

==== Formula One ====
In July 2011, Sky Sports acquired joint rights to broadcast Formula One in the United Kingdom from 2012 until 2018. The deal included the rights to show all practice and qualifying sessions, in addition to the races. The joint broadcast rights were held by BBC but transferred to Channel 4 from the 2016 season. The shared nature of the contract initially meant that Sky Sports F1 showed all races live, with 10 races being shown by both Sky and Channel 4 (who were also televising highlights of all races on a delayed basis), however since the start of the 2019 season, Sky have had exclusive rights to broadcast every race live except the British GP, which is both live on Sky and Channel 4, however Channel 4 still show highlights of both qualifying and the race from every other GP. Whilst the initial announcement did prove controversial (with early promises that the races would not be uninterrupted by commercials doing little to quell the negative initial reaction from many fans and observers), in its first two years of broadcasting, the coverage has twice won F1 International Broadcaster of the Year from the FIA (in 2012 & 2013).

Sky Sports F1 currently broadcast the entire 2023 season in 4K Ultra-HD, on the Sky Q Silver Ultra-HD package.

Presentation team at Grands Prix:

- Simon Lazenby hosts coverage with Martin Brundle, Karun Chandhok, Jenson Button, Naomi Schiff, Bernie Collins, Danica Patrick, Jamie Chadwick and Anthony Davidson as race weekend analysts across the season. Nico Rosberg also serves as an analyst for some races, either being at the track or more recently live from his Monaco home due to being banned from the entering the F1 paddock as he is not vaccinated against COVID-19. If Lazenby is unavailable for a weekend, hosting duties fall in the hands of Natalie Pinkham.
- Anthony Davidson, Bernie Collins and Karun Chandhok all serve as touchscreen analysts to the coverage.
- David Croft provides commentary on practice sessions, qualifying and the race with Harry Benjamin filling in on occasion where Croft is absent. During practice sessions, two of, Button, Collins, Davidson or Chandhok join Croft for co-commentary, while Brundle provides trackside analysis. For qualifying sessions and the race, Brundle is the primary co-commentator, but if unavailable for a race weekend, Chandhok, Davidson or Button stand in as replacements, with Ted Kravitz or Chandhok contributing from the pit lane depending on the race.
- Ted Kravitz, Natalie Pinkham and Rachel Brookes report/present across the pit-lane and paddock and cover for Lazenby as host of some practice sessions.
- Craig Slater reports on races for Sky Sports News.

Sky Sports' additional F1 programming includes:

- The F1 Show
- Ted's Notebook
- Welcome to the Weekend
- The Inside Line (not a Sky production)

=== Golf ===
Golf is one of the most broadcast sports across the Sky Sports channels, with at least one tournament shown live in 50 weeks of the year. Sky Sports' golf presenters include, Nick Dougherty, Sarah Stirk, Rob Lee and James Haddock. The expert analysts include Paul McGinley, Rich Beem, Mark Roe, David Howell and Tony Johnstone. The lead commentators include Ewen Murray, Richard Boxall and Richard Kaufman, as well as presenter, Rob Lee. The co-commentators include expert analysts, McGinley, Beem, Roe, Howell, Johnstone, and presenter, Nick Dougherty, as well as many other guests, with Wayne Riley and Andrew Coltart providing on-course commentary. Tim Barter and Sarah Stirk are the main interviewers on the golf coverage, with James Haddock reporting on majors for Sky Sports News. Sky Sports also use Golf Channel's commentary for broadcasts of the PGA Tour.

==== Major championships ====
Sky Sports has exclusive UK rights for all four majors including the US Open, The Open Championship, the PGA Championship and the Masters Tournament.

Sky also broadcast major championships from the women's tour and senior tour, including the Kraft Nabisco Championship, US Women's Open, Senior PGA Championship, Senior British Open Championship, US Senior Open, and The Women's Open.

Sky will use Golf Channel (another Comcast property) feeds for USGA championships.

==== World Golf Championships ====
Since its inception in 1999, Sky Sports has broadcast the World Golf Championships exclusively live, with the exception of the 2001 WGC-American Express Championship, which was broadcast on the BBC. They usually present the broadcast on site, as they do for major championships and the Ryder Cup, reflecting their importance in the game as the next most important series of events after the majors.

==== PGA Tour ====
Sky also have exclusive live UK rights to broadcast the PGA Tour including The Players Championship and PGA Tour Playoffs for the FedEx Cup until 2022, as well as up to seven events per year from the LPGA Tour.

==== European Tour ====
Sky have rights to at least 32 events on the European Tour until 2022, including the Dubai World Championship and exclusive live coverage of the BMW PGA Championship with highlights only on the BBC.

==== Ryder Cup ====
Sky Sports shows live coverage of the sport's premier event, the Ryder Cup. Since 1995, they have held the exclusive live UK rights to the biennial team event between USA and Europe, broadcasting the event in its entirety for the first time at Oak Hill in 1995. The event was broadcast in High Definition for the first time in 2006 at the K Club in County Kildare Ireland. Since 1999, it has also offered interactive coverage with options including the American coverage, Highlights and course guides. Sky holds the rights until 2012, with BBC broadcasting evening highlights. In 2010, Sky broadcast the Ryder Cup in 3D, making it the first live event on Sky 3D, Europe's first residential 3D channel.

They also broadcast all of the other major professional team events in the sport such as the Presidents Cup, Seve Trophy, Royal Trophy, Omega Mission Hills World Cup and Solheim Cup.

In 2010, Sky Sports broadcast in excess of 150 tournaments from the men's and women's tours.

=== Darts ===
During its first two years, Sky Sports covered some BDO tournaments, in a contract it inherited from BSB. The tournaments covered were the World Masters, Gold Cup, British Open and British International Championships, all four of which were previously broadcast on ITV. Since the creation of the World Darts Council in 1992, since renamed the Professional Darts Corporation (which was formed when many of the leading players, including Phil Taylor, Eric Bristow, John Lowe and Dennis Priestley, broke away from the British Darts Organisation, which had been the game's sole ruling body), Sky Sports has broadcast their main darts tournaments live. Between 1993 and 2007, Sky were the only regular UK broadcaster of PDC Darts (apart from the 1999 PDC v BDO showdown between Phil Taylor and Raymond van Barneveld which was broadcast on ITV). However this changed in 2007 when ITV covered the Grand Slam of Darts. This moved to Sky in 2011, but ITV continued to show the Players Championship Finals, with their coverage expanding to include the Masters and the return of the European Championship from 2013, the UK Open (formerly on Sky) from 2014, and the World Series of Darts events from 2015.

Sky's coverage includes the PDC World Darts Championship which it shows on a temporary channel Sky Sports Darts. The tournament has been broadcast live and in its entirety by Sky Sports in the United Kingdom since its inception. From 2009 onwards, this event has been shot and broadcast in high-definition. The tournament has become more and more popular in recent years with the 2007 World Final achieving a viewing figure in excess of one million for the first time. Sky also shows the World Matchplay, World Grand Prix, Grand Slam of Darts, Premier League, World Cup of Darts, and the final of the World Youth Championship. Sky used to show the UK Open but since 2014 this has been shown on ITV.

Sky Sports has not covered any BDO darts since the split in darts.

Sky Sports darts coverage was initially presented by Jeff Stelling with Eric Bristow and commentary from John Gwynne and Dave Lanning, while Sid Waddell joined Sky from the BBC in 1994. Dave Clark replaced Stelling in 2002 although he had already covered some tournaments in 2001. Stuart Pyke joined the commentary team in 2003 (he also works for ITV coverage of PDC Darts), Rod Harrington and Nigel Pearson joined in 2005, Rod Studd joined in 2008 and former BBC Darts commentators David Croft and John Part joined in 2013.

Sky Sports Darts team
Name	Role
Emma Paton	Lead presenter
Anna Woolhouse	Presenter
Stuart Pyke	Lead commentator and interviewer
Rod Studd	Lead commentator and interviewer
Wayne Mardle	Pundit and lead commentator
Dan Dawson	Pundit and lead commentator
John Part	Pundit and lead commentator
Mark Webster	Pundit and co-commentator
Laura Turner	Pundit and co-commentator
Glen Durrant	Pundit and co-commentator
Michael Bridge	Interviewer and relief presenter
Abigail Davies	Interviewer and lead commentator
Polly James	Interviewer

Former Sky Sports Darts team:

- Eric Bristow (1993–2016)
- Dave Clark (2002–2020)
- David Croft (2013–2021, only on the World Championship and Premier League)
- John Gwynne (1993–2013, subsequently with Eurosport's BDO Darts coverage)
- Rod Harrington
- Dave Lanning (1993–2010 & 2013, previously worked for ITV Sport 1972–1988)
- Nigel Pearson (2006–2022)
- Jeff Stelling (1993–2002)
- Sid Waddell (1994–2012, previously worked for BBC Sport 1978–1994)
- Laura Woods (2020–2023, World Championships only)
- Corrine Hammond (2023 World Championship)

=== Boxing ===
After Sky Sports' six-year contract with Matchroom ended in 2021, Sky announced it had signed a new contract with Top Rank and BOXXER to broadcast live coverage of their fights until 2025. This ended in 202 when BOXXER moved to the BBC. After a short time out of the ring, Sky returned to boxing following a deal with Zuffa Boxing.

Anna Woolhouse is the lead presenter, alongside former boxers, Johnny Nelson, Spencer Oliver, Paulie Malignaggi, Carl Froch and Tony Bellew, with also the likes of Paul Smith and Matthew Macklin. Commentator Adam Smith is alongside Carl Froch or Matthew Macklin for the primary commentary pairing on main event cards. On larger pay-per view events, Tony Bellew, Paulie Malignaggi or David Haye join the commentary team. Andy Clarke and Matthew Macklin commentate on undercard action. The reporter and post-fight interviewer is Andy Scott.

=== Mixed martial arts ===
In February 2019, Sky Sports announced a deal with Bellator to broadcast mixed martial arts events.

In December 2023, Sky Sports became exclusive home for ONE Championship events, which features both mixed martial arts and kickboxing tournaments.

=== American football ===
Sky Sports has covered the NFL since 1995 and following a deal in August 2020 in which Sky and the NFL has agreed a new five-year partnership which sees Sky continue to broadcast games until the end of the 2024 season, now extended until the 2027/28 season. Sky Sports broadcasts every Thursday night, Sunday night and Monday night game live, alongside two Sunday evening games. and this will be increased further under Sky's latest deal which will Sky covering five more Sunday night games – two more 6pm matches and three more 9pm games. Altogether, Sky will now be showing more than half of all NFL matches.

It was also confirmed that Sky Sports NFL, an in-season rebrand of Sky Sports Action would launch on 3 September 2020 and run for the entire duration of the season. Sky Sports NFL has returned in subsequent seasons.

=== Tennis ===
For nearly 25 years, Sky Sports was the main broadcaster of the US Open, covering the even between 1991 and 2015 but decided not to renew its contract to broadcast this event in 2016. The company was able to bid to regain broadcast rights to the US Open for 2023 when Amazon did not extend its contract in 2022. This bid was successful and Sky will now show the tournament until 2027.

Sky was the broadcaster of ATP Tour events from 2002 until 2018, when Amazon Prime Video became the exclusive UK broadcaster. Sky has now regained these rights and will provide coverage of more than 80 events each year until 2028. The events covered will include the Nitto ATP Finals and WTA Finals, all ATP Masters 1000 and WTA 1000 events, 500s and 250 events (excluding domestic events) and the Next Gen ATP Finals. Gigi Salmon will present the coverage with Tim Henman and Laura Robson being the main pundits.

== Summary of sports rights ==
=== Football ===
Football broadcasting rights acquired by Sky
Competition	Region	Broadcast details
FIFA Women's Champions Cup	(United Nations)	Final Four matches live in 2026
Premier League	(England) (Wales)	2019–2029: 215 extra matches were broadcast in 2019–20 and 2020–21 as a result of the COVID-19 pandemic live matches per season (packages B, C, D and E)
English Football League	(England) (Wales)	138 live matches per-season and all 15 play-off matches, including all three finals until May 2024; From 2024–25, Sky will broadcast over 1,000 matches each season, including 328 Championship, 248 League One and 248 League Two games.
EFL Cup	(England) (Wales)	15 live matches per-season, including semi-finals and final until 2024. From the 2024/25 season they will broadcast every game from every round. Many will be on their new service Sky Sports +.
EFL Trophy	(England) (Wales)	Live coverage of the semi-finals and final until May 2024
Women's Super League	(England)	Live coverage until 2030
Scottish Premiership	(Scotland)	2020–2029: Live coverage of 60 matches per season, plus all six play-off matches
NIFL Premiership	(Northern Ireland)	5 live matches per season until the end of 2021/2022 season
Northern Ireland Football League Cup	(Northern Ireland)	NIFL League Cup Final Live
Bundesliga	(Germany)	2025–2029

=== Cricket ===
Event name	Country	Broadcast details
ICC Cricket World Cup	(United Nations)	Live until 2031
ICC World Test Championship	(United Nations)	Live until 2031
ICC T20 World Cup	(United Nations)	Live until 2031
ICC Women's World Cup	(United Nations)	Live until 2031
ICC Women's T20 World Cup	(United Nations)	Live until 2031
ICC U19 World Cup	(United Nations)	Live until 2031
England cricket team and England women's cricket team	(England)	All home Test, ODIs and T20I matches live until 2024, selected tests available in 4K
International Test matches and Limited overs cricket	(United Nations)	Live coverage of most England's overseas Tours, plus Tests, ODIs, and T20Is from India (until 2022), South Africa and Pakistan (until 2024)
County Championship	(England) (Wales)	Live until 2024. At least 60 days of domestic cricket each summer covering each of the major competitions
One-Day Cup	(England) (Wales)	Live until 2024
T20 Blast	(England) (Wales)	36 live matches per season until 2024
The Hundred	(England) (Wales)	Live from 2021 to 2024
Caribbean Premier League	(Cricket West Indies)	All 34 matches live in 2020
Indian Premier League	(India)	All matches live until 2022
Pakistan Super League	(Pakistan)	All matches live until 2024
Lanka Premier League	(Sri Lanka)	All matches live in 2020
Abu Dhabi T10 League	(United Arab Emirates)	All matches live in 2021

=== Rugby union ===
League name	Country	Broadcast details
IRB Sevens World Series	(United Nations)	Live
IRB Junior World Championship	(United Nations)	Live
British and Irish Lions	(United Kingdom) (Ireland)	Live in 2021
The Rugby Championship	(Argentina) (Australia) (New Zealand) (South Africa)	
SANZAAR Tests	(United Nations)	Including tours to Argentina, Australia, New Zealand and South Africa by England, Ireland, Scotland and Wales: Live until 2025
Super Rugby	(Fiji) (Australia) (New Zealand)	Live until 2025
National Provincial Championship	(New Zealand)	Live
Currie Cup	(South Africa)	Live

=== Golf ===
Event	Country	Broadcast details
U.S. Masters	(United States)	Live coverage in 2023
The Open Championship	(United Kingdom)	Live until 2024
U.S. Open	(United States)	
PGA Championship	(United States)	Live coverage until 2024
Ryder Cup	(United States) (Europe)	Live until 2029
World Golf Championships	(United Nations)	Live until 2024
PGA Tour	(United States)	32 live PGA Tour events including FedEx Cup play-offs and Presidents Cup until 2024
European Tour	(Europe)	32 live events until 2024
Scottish Open	(Scotland)	Live until 2024
Wales Open	(Wales)	Live on Sky Sports
Women's British Open	(United Kingdom)	Live on Sky Sports
Irish Open Golf	(Republic of Ireland)	Live on Sky Sports

=== Motorsport ===
Series name	Nationality	Broadcast details
Formula One	(United Nations)	All races live until 2024 on Sky Sports F1 with two prime time races and British Grand Prix on Sky Sports Mix, as well as events exclusively available in 4K
FIA Formula 2 Championship (previously known as GP2)	(United Nations)	Live on Sky Sports F1
FIA Formula 3 Championship (previously known as GP3)	(United Nations)	Live on Sky Sports F1
IndyCar Series	(United States) (Canada)	Live on Sky Sports F1 from 2019
Extreme E	(United Nations)	Live on Sky Sports Action (from round 2 onwards), Sky Sports Arena and Sky Sports Mix for 2021

=== Rugby league ===
Competition	Country	Broadcast details
Super League	(United Kingdom) (France)	All 167 matches per season live from 2024 to 2026
World Club Challenge	(United Kingdom) (France) (Australia) (New Zealand)	Live

=== Horse racing ===
Race name	Country	Broadcast details
Dubai World Cup	(United Arab Emirates)	Live coverage
Sky Sports Racing	(United Kingdom)	Live coverage from 29 UK courses including Chepstow and Lingfield

=== Equestrianism ===
Race name	Country	Broadcast details
Horse of the Year Show	(England)	Live
Hickstead Derby	(England)	Live

=== Darts ===
Tournament	Country	Broadcast details
PDC World Darts Championship	(England)	Live until 2030
Premier League Darts	(United Kingdom) (Republic of Ireland) (Netherlands) (Germany) (Belgium)	Live until 2030
Grand Slam of Darts	(England)	Live until 2030
World Matchplay	(England)	Live until 2030
World Grand Prix	(Republic of Ireland) (England)	Live until 2030
PDC World Cup of Darts	(United Nations)	Live until 2030

=== Triathlon ===
Series name	Country	Broadcast details
British Triathlon Super Series	(United Kingdom)	Highlights

=== American football ===
Competition	Country	Broadcast details
Super Bowl	(United States)	Live until 2028
NFL playoffs	(United States)	Live until 2028
NFL regular season	(United States)	Live until 2028
NFL London Games	(United Kingdom)	Live until 2028

=== Netball ===
Series name	Country	Broadcast details
Netball Superleague	(England) (Wales)	Live coverage

=== Badminton ===
Series name	Country	Broadcast details
National Badminton League	(England)	Live coverage

=== Bowls ===
Series name	Country	Broadcast details
International Open Bowls	(United Nations)	Live coverage

=== Basketball ===
Series name	Country	Broadcast details
NBA	(United States)	Live until the mid-2030s

== Previous coverage ==
=== Football ===
==== Premier League ====
Between the 2016–17 and 2018–19 seasons, Sky Sports broadcast a 3.00pm Saturday match exclusively for subscribers in the Republic of Ireland. The coverage went out under the Premier League Live banner and was anchored by the match commentators. The rights for these games were taken over by Premier Sports for the 2019–20 season onwards.

==== UEFA Champions League ====
Sky Sports covered the UEFA Champions League between 2003 and 2015 but in 2013, Sky was outbid by BT Sport and the rights transferred at the end of the 2014/15 tournament, with highlights on ITV Sport. Since 2018, BT Sport has also acquired the rights to the highlights of the Champions League and UEFA Europa League.

==== FA Cup and FA Community Shield ====
Sky Sports covered the FA Cup since it first went on air as BSB's Sports Channel in 1990 alongside the BBC but has not broadcast the FA Cup since 2008 after both broadcasters were outbid by ITV and Setanta. After the collapse of Setanta, Sky did not bid for the rights so they went to ESPN UK. In 2014–15, the rights transferred from ITV and ESPN to BBC and BT Sport after bidding together. From 2020, ITV won the rights back off BT Sport meaning live coverage of all FA Cup games is on free-to-air television with BBC and ITV sharing the rights.

Sky Sports had been the first channel to show the Community Shield live and as with the FA Cup, Sky has not broadcast this event since 2011 after rights transferred to ITV and then BT Sport, then later back to ITV.

==== England National Football Team ====
One of Sky's first major live football rights deal was exclusive live coverage of the England football team and held these rights throughout the 1990s. The live rights transferred to BBC Sport in 2001 until 2008, and currently remain free to air with ITV owning the rights.

Sky Sports currently still provide coverage of England matches, however not nearly on the same scale as in the 1990s. They are limited to just UEFA Nations League and mid-season international friendlies which thanks to the aforementioned competition, have not occurred as often as they once did.

==== UEFA Nations League ====
Until 2022 Sky Sports held the rights to every home and away match featuring Scotland, Northern Ireland, Republic of Ireland and Wales and cover every other match in the European Qualifiers except the England match which is on ITV, under this Sky Sports have highlights of England matches. However, in 2018, Sky won the rights to show the UEFA Nations League meaning all home nations games would be broadcast exclusively by Sky, including England games. England matches in the Nations League are presented by David Jones with pundits including Gary Neville, Jamie Carragher and Jamie Redknapp. The commentators include Martin Tyler and Alan Smith with Patrick Davison reporting. For highlights of England matches in the European Qualifiers, there is no studio presentation and Martin Tyler and Alan Smith provide commentary.

The games were broadcast across four channels, Sky Sports Main Event, Sky Sports Premier League, Sky Sports Football and Sky Sports Mix. Other UEFA Nations League, European Qualifiers and international friendly matches broadcast on these channels involve countries such as France, Spain, Italy, Germany, Netherlands and Portugal or games that kick off at an earlier time than the prime time 7.45pm slot. These games are commentary only broadcasts with no studio presentation. The rest of the UEFA Nations League and European Qualifiers are broadcast via the Sky Sports Football Red Button feature or online via the Sky Sports App with World Feed commentary.

==== La Liga ====
Sky Sports was the long-time home of La Liga, the top-tier of Spanish domestic football, having broadcast the competition for 21 years. From the 2018–19 season, the rights to broadcast La Liga were won by Eleven Sports, then subsequently Premier Sports. During Sky Sports' tenure as La Liga broadcaster, live matches were broadcast on Friday, Saturday, Sunday and Monday nights. Towards the end of the contract, Sky Sports broadcast up to ten live matches each round with the coverage handled by the commentators who included Rob Palmer, Kevin Keatings, Jon Driscoll and Dominic Johnson. They would usually be joined by summarisers, Gerry Armstrong, Terry Gibson, David Phillips, Garry Birtles and Efan Ekoku. Highlights and weekly review of La Liga, were shown on Revista de La Liga, presented by the Spanish football experts. Mark Bolton, and Guillem Balagué.

==== Eredivisie ====
In 2014, Sky Sports signed an exclusive four-year deal to show live matches from the Dutch top-flight league Eredivisie. The commentary was taken from the world feed provided by IMG Worldwide. Starting with the 2018–19 season, live and exclusive rights were won by Eleven Sports.

==== Chinese Super League ====
In 2016, Sky Sports added another competition to its schedule of live football with the addition of the Ping An Chinese Football Association Super League. Commentary was from the World Feed, usually by Wayne Boyce, Paul Walker or Dan O'Hagan. From the start of the 2019 season, live and exclusive rights were won by Eleven Sports.

==== Baller League UK ====
In 2025, Sky Sports signed a deal to broadcast all matches from the six-a-side football competition Baller League UK on television in addition to its usual free-to-air broadcasting via the league's Twitch and YouTube channels. Apart from commercial breaks, the Sky broadcast did not differ from what was shown online. Whilst the deal was initially meant for Season 1, the deal was renewed for the next two seasons before Sky decided not to renew their deal, as well as declining further investment in the league, for Season 4 in August 2026.

=== Rugby union ===
Sky Sports was the first channel to show live rugby union every week when it picked up the rights to show the top division of England club rugby in the mid-1990s. The rights transferred to ESPN in 2009 and the league is now covered by BT Sport. Sky Sports also covered England matches from the Five/Six Nations from 1997 to 2002 as well as France v England with all other matches being live on the BBC, the rights were sold to the BBC in 2003 and they covered every match live from the Six Nations until 2015 when BBC and ITV teamed up to keep the rights free to air after the BBC were outbid by Sky Sports with BBC covering France, Wales and Scotland home matches and ITV covering England, Ireland and Italy.

In 2003, Sky Sports began its coverage of the Heineken Cup, when it outbid the previous rights holder BBC Sport with its offer of £20 million for three years. Coverage of ten matches each pool weekend and all knockout matches from the Heineken Cup was the norm. Additionally, up to three matches per round in the Amlin Challenge Cup were usually shown. Following the demise of the Heineken Cup, Sky Sports shared the rights to the newly formed Rugby Champions Cup with BT Sport, until the 2017–18 season. Sky exclusively broadcast up to 30 pool matches, two quarter-finals and one semi-final from each competition with the finals being shown by both. Sky also received first pick on Challenge Cup matches involving Premiership Rugby clubs. From the 2018–19 season, Sky Sports no longer have the shared rights to the Champions Cup, these passed to Channel 4 and so did the contracts to cover Ireland's Autumn Internationals after 2018.

Commencing from the 2014–15 season, Sky Sports began showing games from the Pro14 (covering 30 matches alongside the current terrestrial broadcasters BBC Wales, S4C, TG4, BBC Northern Ireland and BBC Alba). From 2018, Premier Sports broadcast all 152 games live.

=== Rugby league ===
Until 2012, Sky aired Championship and Northern Rail Cup games on Thursdays and Sundays, until the rights for these were purchased by Premier Sports.

Sky also held the rights to show the majority of the matches from the Four Nations and the previous competition the Tri Nations live, with the other games being shown live or in highlights form on BBC Sport and Sky Sports previously showed the 2008 World Cup exclusively live with only highlights on the BBC. This agreement ended in 2012 and Sky Sports surprisingly lost the rights to International Rugby League from the 2013 Rugby League World Cup to the BBC and Premier Sports. The matches for the 2013 and 2017 Rugby League World Cup were shared between the BBC and Premier Sports with BBC covering all England matches, Wales v Italy, One Quarter Final, One Semi-final and the Final in 2013. The BBC and Premier Sports had also signed a deal to cover the 2014 and 2016 Four Nations.

=== Tennis ===
Until 2015, tennis was a major staple of Sky Sports' output but decided to withdraw from the sport until 2023 when it resumed coverage of two events which it had previously shown for many years – the US Open and the ATP Tour.

Other previous tennis coverage on Sky had included the Davis Cup tennis but these rights moved to the BBC and Eurosport. Sky was the broadcaster of ATP Tour events from 2002 until 2018, when Amazon Prime Video became the exclusive UK broadcaster. And during the early 1990s, BSB and then Sky Sports broadcast highlights of Wimbledon.

The Sky Sports tennis coverage until 2015 was presented by Marcus Buckland with pundits Annabel Croft, Greg Rusedski and Peter Fleming. Commentators included Barry Millns, Leif Shiras, Mark Petchey and Barry Cowan.

=== Ice hockey ===
In 2006, Sky Sports began showing a replay from a match in the Elite Ice Hockey League every week. Due to large audience numbers, even though it is normally on Sky Sports 4, they decided to show a live game for the first time in several years when they showed the play-off finals in 2010. A new deal was signed for the 2010/11 season in which Sky agreed to show eight live games throughout the season and a weekly highlights show. However, the broadcast rights have since moved to Premier Sports.

=== Boxing ===
In 1994, Sky Sports won the contract to show fights promoted by Matchroom Sport and the two enjoyed a deal which lasted for 27 years. The most recent contract provided Sky Sports with upwards of 20 boxing events per year. In June 2021, fights promoted by Matchroom Sport moved to streaming service DAZN.

In April 2019, Sky Sports aired nine fights of the World Boxing Super Series in the 2018–19 season, starting with the semi-final world title bouts between bantamweights Nonito Donaire and Stephon Young followed by super-lightweights Regis Prograis and Kiryl Relikh, and ending in November with the bantamweight final between Nonito Donaire and Naoya Inoue. Previously, the event had been aired on ITV Box Office in the 2017–18 season but ITV did not renew the contract for the following season.

=== WWF/WWE ===
In 1989, Sky acquired the rights to World Wrestling Federation, which later changed its name to World Wrestling Entertainment in May 2002 due to legal issues with World Wide Fund for Nature.

Part of the deal with Sky stated that major pay-per-view's such as WrestleMania, Survivor Series, Royal Rumble and SummerSlam were part of the Sky Sports Box Office pay-per-view service, and that SmackDown's first broadcast moved from Sky One to Sky Sports. As part of the deal, Raw was shown live early on Tuesday morning because of the time difference. SmackDown was broadcast live early Wednesday morning for the same reason. Sky also broadcast WWE's third brand, ECW on Sci-Fi before it was cancelled. For a couple of months it replaced WWE Velocity on Sunday mornings. It was shown two nights after the US broadcast after a viewer complained to Ofcom in August 2006 about an image in the opening credits, and Sky agreed to air the program after the watershed. The deal of 14 pay-per-views did not account for WWE's extra pay-per-views which have been added subsequently, and therefore WWE Cyber Sunday would not have been picked up by Sky. However, a last-minute deal was struck between Sky and WWE, that allowed the pay-per-view to be shown live on Sky Sports 1.

The first WWE event to be shown in widescreen (16:9) format on Sky Sports was No Way Out on 18 February 2008 at 1.00am on Sky Sports 1. Although after this, other WWE programming were still in standard (4:3) format however due to complaints all WWE programming will now be airing in widescreen from a down-scaled HD feed.

When WWE Heat ended in June 2008, it was replaced with WWE Vintage Collection, a programme which showcases classic archive matches from the extensive WWE Video Library.

On 30 January 2014, Sky Sports announced they had signed another five-year deal with WWE, it will now continue to exclusively broadcast flagship shows in the United Kingdom and Ireland through to 2019. WWE pay-per-views were previously shown on Sky Sports for free roughly every five months, with all remaining pay-per-views being broadcast on Sky Sports Box Office at an additional cost. However, as of 2015, all pay-per-views were broadcast on Sky Sports Box Office at a cost of £19.95. On 20 June 2019, it was announced that WWE would be leaving Sky Sports after 30 years, with BT Sport taking over the rights from January 2020.

=== Darts ===
Sky Sports previously broadcast the UK Open from its inception in 2003 up until the 2013 tournament, after which it moved to ITV.

=== Basketball ===
Sky has previously covered the NBA, including during the early 1990s, and most recently from 2019 until 2023. However, after that deal expired, TNT Sports took over as the UK broadcaster of the NBA.

=== Gaelic games ===
On 2 April 2014, Sky Sports signed a deal with the Gaelic Athletic Association (GAA) to broadcast fixtures from both the All-Ireland Senior Football Championship (SFC) and the All-Ireland Senior Hurling Championship (SHC). The deal gave Sky Sports 20 championship matches across both sports (hurling and football), including both semi-finals and both finals. Sky would have exclusive rights in both the Republic of Ireland and the United Kingdom to 14 of these matches, with the remaining six matches being simultaneously broadcast by RTÉ as the deal covered the years from 2014 to 2016. It was estimated that the GAA would make €0.5 million from the deal. The deal led to debate in Ireland, with Many loyal fans were unable to watch some key games during the All-Ireland season. The debate was reignited, with former Offaly hurler and television match analyst Michael Duignan stating publicly on RTÉ: "The biggest disgrace of the weekend was on Saturday evening, that Waterford and Kilkenny (Round 2 hurling match) wasn't shown free-to-air in this country", a statement which resounded with many GAA fans across Ireland and gained much public sympathy, bringing further into question the continuation of the Sky GAA deal in the long term. On the other hand, the GAA was unlikely to receive the same amount of money from RTÉ as it got from Sky, especially given increasing emphasis on soccer.

On 24 October 2022, Sky Sports and the GAA announced a mutual agreement to end their broadcast partnership after nine years.

=== NCAA ===
In November 2023, Sky announced an agreement with ESPN International to acquire rights to ESPN College Football broadcasts for the remainder of the 2023 season and the 2024 season on Sky Sports NFL, including three games a week during the regular season, studio programs such as College GameDay and Half-time Report, and ESPN-televised bowl games. The deal also saw Sky show three ESPN College Basketball games a week plus March Madness. For the 2025/26 season the rights passed to DAZN.

=== Basketball ===
In 2018, Sky Sports signed a four-year deal to broadcast the NBA in the United Kingdom. The rights then moved to TNT Sports.

In November 2020, coverage of the British Basketball League returned to Sky Sports in a new two-year deal which saw Sky broadcasting 30 games per season, including BBL Trophy Final, BBL Cup Final and BBL Playoffs. This has been extended to cover the 2023/24 season. However, when the competition was relaunched in 2024 as Super League Basketball, coverage moved to DAZN.
