= The Grade Cricketer =

Australian cricket writers

Sam Perry
Personal information
- Full name: Samuel James
- Nickname: Pez, Drizzy, Buckets
- Batting: Right-handed
- Bowling: Right-arm leg spin
- Role: All-rounder

International information
- National side: nil

Domestic team information
- Years: Team
- 2000s-2010s: Randwick Petersham 2nd XI

Career statistics
Competition	Test	ODI	FC	LA
Matches	0	0	0	0
Runs scored	0	0	0	0
Batting average	NA	NA	NA	NA
100s/50s	0/0	0/0	0/0	0/0
Top score	NA	NA	NA	NA
Balls bowled	0	0	0	0
Wickets	0	0	0	0
Bowling average	NA	NA	NA	NA
5 wickets in innings	0	0	0	0
10 wickets in match	0	0	0	0
Best bowling	NA	NA	NA	NA
Catches/stumpings	0/0	0/0	0/0	0/0
Medal record
Men's Cricket
Representing
nil

Ian Higgins
Personal information
- Full name: Ian Higgins
- Nickname: Higgo, Higgs, The Higgs Boson
- Batting: Right-handed
- Bowling: Unknown
- Role: Wicket-keeper

International information
- National side: nil

Domestic team information
- Years: Team
- 2000s-2010s: Gordon 3rd XI

Career statistics
Competition	Test	ODI	FC	LA
Matches	0	0	0	0
Runs scored	0	0	0	0
Batting average	NA	NA	NA	NA
100s/50s	0/0	0/0	0/0	0/0
Top score	NA	NA	NA	NA
Balls bowled	0	0	0	0
Wickets	0	0	0	0
Bowling average	NA	NA	NA	NA
5 wickets in innings	0	0	0	0
10 wickets in match	0	0	0	0
Best bowling	NA	NA	NA	NA
Catches/stumpings	0/0	0/0	0/0	0/0
Medal record
Men's Cricket
Representing
nil

The Grade Cricketer is a pen name for an Australian comedy troupe who focus on sport, particularly cricket. The troupe write books, create video and audio podcasts, do live sports commentary, as well as interviews and live shows. The currently active members are Sam Perry and Ian Higgins. Dave Edwards was part of the team until 2020. They were friends who played 1st and 2nd grade cricket in Australia and began a Twitter account as @gradecricketer, whilst promoting their mantra “quit cricket, get massive”. They subsequently wrote books and columns and host a podcast.

== Podcast ==
The Grade Cricketer Podcast is presented by the team during the Australian cricketing summer, and is a comedic, satirical take on the cricketing world. There have been eight seasons since the promo episode was released in October 2016. Music is provided by Adrian Leung, with cover design by Julia Dowe. The podcast is released in both audio and video formats.

=== Interviews ===
Episodes often include guest interviews, and the format regularly involves one interview with a cricket journalist, and a further one later on with a current or former player. These always begin with some form of the question "What's your relationship with Grade Cricket?"; whilst the player interviews end with throw-downs, in which the presenters ask ridiculous, long-winded questions, to which the guest can often respond only with a binary yes/no answer. The most frequent guests, also known as "best friends of the show", are Adam "Collo" Collins from the journalism world, with ten appearances, and Ed "Ted" Cowan from the players with six (also the first guest, having to re-record his interview after a technical mishap - this has now occurred twice).

=== AskTGC ===
The last section of the podcast normally involves answering questions submitted to The Grade Cricketer via social media, (the Twitter hashtag being #askTGC, hence the name). These questions are often incredibly long, leading Higgins to sometimes refer to the section as their "short story competition", but also sometimes little more than a statement followed by "thoughts?", and regularly concern topics such as alpha-ing, father-son relationships, social status within clubs/teams, retirement from the game, and other general advice relating to the world of amateur cricket.

=== Advertisements ===
Over the course of the podcast run, advertisements for various products, both real and imaginary tie-in ones, have been inserted, voiced by Toby Shain and, occasionally, the hosts themselves. Products include:

==== Fake products/services ====
- Chop King Cologne: a fragrance inspired by the concept of the Chop King, with the tagline of "reek of runs without hitting them"
- The Grade Cricket Rehabilitation Centre: a centre for reintegrating former grade cricket players into normal society
- Reno Rampage: a parody of a Renovation Rescue-style show, specifically aimed at renovating grade cricket clubhouses
- Bravago: a parody of travel company Trivago
- Alpha-Ade: a fictional sportsdrink, parodying Gator/Powerade

==== Real products/services ====
- OLED TVs: a parody of David Warner's advertisements for the same product during the 2016/17 Australian home summer series
- Grade cricket
- The Grade Cricketer: Tea and No Sympathy (2017)

==== Cricket News ====
Upon bomb shell cricket news that local English cricketer 'Brian Devine' dubbed "Clicky Ponting" was caught imitating a bat on ball edge noise by clicking his fingers as an opposition player would play and miss at a delivery, The Grade Cricketer's Sam 'JT' Perry and Ian 'Tits' Higgins took matters upon themselves and reached out directly to the English cricket club to offer aid in seeking legal representation. Source's close to the two believe their stance is pro-clicking and seeking alternative cheating accusations and stories amongst the cricketing community, Perry stating "The cricket community are like pigs rolling in mud when it comes to ingenius exploits"

== Books ==
- The Grade Cricketer (2016)
- Tea and No Sympathy (2017)
- The Grade Cricketer: Alphas, Champs and Chop Kings (2025)

== Podcast Episode List ==
Season 1 2016/17 summer
# / title	Guest(s)
The Grade Cricketer Podcast promo	-
1. Selection Night, with Merv Hughes	Merv Hughes
2. Summer Begins, Ed Cowan	Ed Cowan
3. Gut Feel, with Brad Hogg	Brad Hogg
4. The Collapse, with Brendon Julian	Brendon Julian
5. Down The Barrel, with Rob Quiney	Rob Quiney
6. The Renaissance, with Brad Haddin	Brad Haddin
7. Hands, with Stuart MacGill	Stuart MacGill
8. Hard Day's Night, with Gideon Haigh	Gideon Haigh
9. The Christmas Double, with Chris Rogers and Ryan Carters	Chris Rogers & Ryan Carters
10. SCG Day 1, with Dirk Nannes	Dirk Nannes
11. SCG Day 2, with Geoff Lemon	Geoff Lemon
12. SCG Day 3	-
13. SCG Day 4, with Brittany Carter	Brittany Carter
14. SCG Day 5, with Andrew Jones	Andrew Jones
15. What Now? with Brett Geeves, Mickey Edwards and Will Pucovski	Brett Geeves, Mickey Edwards & Will Pucovski
16. Indian Horizons, with Sam, Dave and Ian	-
17. Awards Night, with Richard Hinds	Richard Hinds
18. Season Finale, with David Hussey and Bryce McGain	David Hussey & Bryce McGain

Season 2 2017/18 summer
# / title	Guest(s)
The Grade Cricketer Summer 2017/18 promo	-
19. Going 'Round again, with Ed Cowan	Adam Collins & Ed Cowan
20. #ThanksCricket, with Pat Cummins	Andrew Wu & Pat Cummins
21. Voluminous Runs, with Brett Geeves	Will Macpherson & Brett Geeves
22. The Overseas Pro, with Dan Norcross	Adam Collins & Dan Norcross
The New Fragrance, by TGC	-
23. Club Presidents, with James Sutherland	Izzy Westbury & James Sutherland
24. Middle-Aged Levers, with The Betoota Advocate's Clancy Overell	Tom Morris & Clancy Overell
25. Their Heads Met, with Chris Rogers	Will Macpherson & Chris Rogers
26. Rig-o-saurus, with Mark Butcher	Mark Butcher
27. Always Look Good, with Mike Atherton	Adam Collins & Mike Atherton
28. Everything's Binary, with Simon Katich and Gideon Haigh	Gideon Haigh & Simon Katich
29. Doesn't Matter How You Get 'Em, with Trent Woodhill	Trent Woodhill & Will Macpherson
30. Labor Omnia Vincit, with Jarrod Kimber	Jarrod Kimber
31. SCG Ashes Day 1, with Ed Cowan	Ed Cowan & Will Macpherson
32. SCG Ashes Day 2	Adam Collins
33. Do You Remember Me? with Jackson Bird and Ryan Carters	Ryan Carters & Jackson Bird
34. Don't Touch It! with Steve O'Keefe	Andrew Walton, Izzy Westbury & Steve O'Keefe
35. Season Finale (Part 1), with Mitch Marsh and George Bailey	Vithushan Ehantharajah & Mitch Marsh
35. Season Finale (Part 2), with Mitch Marsh and George Bailey	George Bailey
36. Alpha Wars, with Merv Hughes	Adam Collins & Merv Hughes
37. Going Tropicana, with Ed Cowan	Dan Brettig & Ed Cowan
38. "But What's He Like As A Bloke?"	Adam Collins
39. Alpha Meltdown, with Ellyse Perry	Peter Lalor, Ellyse Perry & Dr Tim Sharp
40. The Beta Era, with Damien Fleming	Adam Collins & Damien Fleming
41. They Were Friends, with Trent Copeland	Paul Kennedy & Trent Copeland

Season 3 2018/19 summer
# / title	Guest(s)
42. The Australian Way, with Ed Cowan and Gideon Haigh	Gideon Haigh & Ed Cowan
43. Doctors Hate Him, with Jason Gillespie	Adam Collins & Jason Gillespie
44. Australian Test Captains, with Steve Waugh and Tim Paine	Tim Paine & Steve Waugh
45. Sixty-Odd, with Adam Gilchrist	Dan Brettig & Adam Gilchrist
46. Head Honchos, with Kevin Roberts	Kevin Roberts
47. Playa, with Usman Khawaja	Usman Khawaja
48. Huge, If True, with Brad Hodge	Richard Hinds & Brad Hodge
49. Cop That, with Alyssa Healy and Gerard Whateley	Gerard Whateley & Alyssa Healy
50. Double Up, with Will Somerville	Brittany Carter & Will Somerville
51. Monday Circuit, with Matt Renshaw	Geoff Lemon & Matt Renshaw
52. Moving The Deck Chairs On The Titanic, with Jim Maxwell	Jim Maxwell & Peter Lalor
53. Into The Wilderness, with Mel McLaughlin and Moises Henriques	Mel McLaughlin & Moises Henriques
54. The Secret Knock, with Steve O'Keefe	Ben Horne & Steve O'Keefe
55. I Hate it So Much, with Jason Sangha and Adam Zampa	Jason Sangha & Adam Zampa
56. Popezilla, with Lloyd Pope	Lloyd Pope
57. Problem Solved, with Glenn Maxwell	Ben Jones & Glenn Maxwell
58. #AskTGC Special	-
59. Season Finale, with Rob Quiney and Cameron White	Dan Brettig, Rob Quiney & Cameron White

Season 4 2019 World Cup & 2019 Ashes
# / title	Guest(s)
60. How Good Is Australia, with Ed Cowan (World Cup Special #1)	Dan Brettig & Ed Cowan
61. Land of Hope and Glory, with Will Pucovski & Izzy Westbury (World Cup Special #2)	Izzy Westbury & Will Pucovski
62. Tournament Opener Reactions	Will Macpherson
63. Decent Gas, with Shaun Tait	Ali Martin & Shaun Tait
64. It's Alive	Vithushan Ehantharaja
65. That's What A Coulter-Nile Is	Adam Collins
66. Walking Like A Dude, with Niall O'Brien	Adam Collins & Niall O'Brien
67. Next!	Mel Farrell
68. Chris Woakes Bats 3	-
69. Kashmir, with Ryan Harris	Vithushan Ehantharajah & Ryan Harris
70. Eoin Morgan Hits More Sixes Than You Ever Have	-
71. Warner's 166 Problems	-
72. Lasith Malinga's Rig Destroys England, with Mark Butcher	Mark Butcher
73. England's Deep-Seated Psychological Vulnerability	-
74. Catastrophic Permutations, with Kurtis Patterson	Kurtis Patterson
75. Australia May Never Lose Again	-
76. Salads Everywhere, with George Bailey	George Bailey
77. England Are Here	-
78. Thursday Showdown, with Chris Lynn and Dan Norcross	Chris Lynn & Dan Norcross
79. Barefoot, with Ellyse Perry	Ellyse Perry
80. Smashed	-
81. Oh. My. God	-
82. Asterisk, with Alex Carey	Alex Carey
83. Shower Politics, with Cameron Bancroft	Cameron Bancroft
84. Steve Smith Makes Me Feel Safe, with Marcus North	Marcus North
85. "Congratulations Jofra", with Peter Siddle	Peter Siddle
86. Marnus! with Trent Copeland	Trent Copeland
87. All Roads Leeds To, with Marnus Labuschagne	Marnus Labuschagne
88. This Is Very Raw, with Tim Bresnan	Tim Bresnan & Dean Wilson
89. To Old Trafford, with Doug Bollinger & Steve Waugh	Doug Bollinger & Steve Waugh
90. Too Good, with Chris Rogers	Chris Rogers
91. Fin	Dean Jones
92. The Boys of Summer, with Pavel Florin	Pavel Florin

Season 5 2019/20 summer
# / title	Guest(s)
93. Empire Rising?, with Dan Christian	Dan Christian
94. I Want To Feel Safe This Summer, with Ed Cowan & Russel Arnold	Ed Cowan & Russel Arnold
95. Finding Meaning, with Pete Handscomb	Peter Handscomb
96. It Happened Again, with Adam Zampa	Adam Zampa
97. The Circuit, with Brian Lara and Bob Murphy	Brian Lara & Bob Murphy
98. Safe At Last, with Bernard Fanning & Robelinda2	Bernard Fanning & Robelinda2
99. The Right Kind of Runs, with Richard Chee Quee	Richard Chee Quee
100. Start Again, with John Hastings & Gideon Haigh	John Hastings & Gideon Haigh
101. Big Papi, with Marcus Stoinis	Marcus Stoinis
102. It's Always Been Hot, with Chris Green	Chris Green
103. Silly Buggers, with Kane Richardson	Kane Richardson
104. Low-key Summer, with Sean Abbott	Sean Abbott
105. Easy Cricket, with Josh Phillipe	Josh Phillipe
106. It's Just On, with Clive Rose and Beau Webster	Clive Rose & Beau Webster
107. Relentless YoY Growth, with Michael Vaughan	Michael Vaughan
108. Gas Truck Pt II, with Jackson Bird & Andrew McDonald	Adam Linforth, Jackson Bird & Andrew McDonald
109. Reasonably Large Evening, with no one	-
110. A Nation Expects, with Belinda Clark and Annabel Sutherland	Annabel Sutherland & Belinda Clark
111. Mean Tweets, with Jimmy Neesham	Jimmy Neesham
112. Short Sleeves, with Seb Gotch	Seb Gotch
113. Yeah the Girls! with Alyssa Healy, Nathan Lyon and Peter Siddle	Alyssa Healy, Nathan Lyon, Peter Siddle & Tim Paine
114. The Test: Blue Carpet Special, with Smith, Carey, Khawaja, Siddle, Paine, Lyon, Langer, Finch, Cummins, Labuschagne, Zampa (in order of appearance)	Adrian Brown, Steve Smith, Alex Carey, Usman Khawaja, Peter Siddle, Tim Paine, Nathan Lyon, Justin Langer, Aaron Finch, Pat Cummins, Marnus Labuschagne & Adam Zampa
115. Stay In, with Dr John Orchard and Tim Bresnan	John Orchard, Vithushan Ehantharajah & Tim Bresnan
116. Season Finale, with Justin Langer and Aaron Finch	Justin Langer & Aaron Finch

Season 6 2020 winter
# / title	Guest(s)
117. A Natural Vector of Disease, with Tim Bresnan, Stephen O'Keefe and Jonathon Wilson	Steve O'Keefe, Jonathon Wilson & Tim Bresnan
118. It Returns, with Monty Panesar and Jason Gillespie	Monty Panesar & Jason Gillespie
119. Bio Insecurity, with Josh Hazlewood, Sam Robson and Barney Ronay	Josh Hazlewood, Sam Robson & Barney Ronay
120. Bubble Boys, with Jack Leach and Mitchell Starc	Jack Leach & Mitchell Starc
121. Full Whites, with Matthew Hayden and Steven Finn	Matthew Hayden & Steven Finn
122. Top 4 Big Boys, with Rob Key and Brendon Julian	Rob Key & Brendan Julian
123. Wet Ass Pitches, with Ricky Ponting	Ricky Ponting
124. Sexual Chocolate, with Trent Boult and Ryan Sidebottom	Trent Boult & Ryan Sidebottom
125. Bit Going On, with Sam Billings and Harry Conway	Sam Billings & Harry Conway
126. Quarantine Cuts, with Mike Whitney and Chris Rogers	Mike Whitney & Chris Rogers
127. Collapse, with Travis Head	Travis Head
128. Tall Runs, with Zak Crawley and Shane Lee	Zak Crawley & Shane Lee
129. Deano, with Ashton Agar and Damien Fleming	Ashton Agar & Damien Fleming
130. Not Bad, with Neil Wagner and Jason Krejza	Neil Wagner & Jason Krejza
131. Rings, with Adam Gilchrist	Adam Gilchrist

== TV show ==
In 2018, The Grade Cricketer on 7 show was launched on 7Sport's YouTube channel. The season covered the 2018/19 summer of cricket and featured 11 episodes featuring all of the trio. In 2019, The Grade Cricketer on 7 was moved to 7plus for season 2 covering the 2019/20 summer of cricket; season 2 was only presented by Ian Higgins and Sam Perry.

== Live shows ==
The Grade Cricketer has presented live shows over multiple Australian summers and the English summers of 2019 and 2023, covering the 2019 World Cup and the 2019 and 2023 Ashes. The live shows, like the podcasts, usually feature guests.

In 2024, they hosted a live show with guest Ravi Shastri in New York City during the 2024 ICC Men's T20 World Cup.

== Terminology ==
Many terms have been popularised through the books and podcast efforts of The Grade Cricketer. These include:

- to alpha: to exert dominance over another person, by word or action
- to beta: to be alphaed
- rig: the physical conditioning of a person's body. In the words of one of the founders, Sam Perry, “rig is more of a holistic thing. It’s basically everything you are setting up.”
- to champ someone: to call another person by "champion" or any derivation of the word, including, but not limited to: champ, champignon, Champs-Élysées, Champions League
- circuit: post-game revelry enjoyed with teammates at various drinking establishments
- a chop: a sexual conquest

Other terms commonly used, particularly in the AskTGC correspondence section of the podcast, include:

- levers: arms, specifically with reference to a batsman's six-hitting ability
- salad: a person's head hair
- triple C: Century-Circuit-Chop; the rare event of all the following events achieved on the same day/night in order: 1. a player scoring a century 2. enjoying a noteworthy night out, or circuit, with their teammates 3. having sexual intercourse.
- pipes: biceps
- Chop King: one proficient in chopping. Also the name of the self-endorsed cologne with the tag line “Reek of runs without actually scoring them.”

== See also ==
- List of Australian podcasts
- List of sports podcasts
