= Bill Leslie (commentator) =

British football commentator

William Leslie (born 8 November 1971) is a British football commentator.

== Biography ==
Bill Leslie was born in London in 1971.

Leslie's first broadcasting experience was with London radio station Capital Gold, working initially as a football reporter and secondary commentator before taking the lead role on Jonathan Pearce's departure to the BBC in 2002. His first television commentary experience was with Channel Five – covering the 2002 UEFA Under-21 Championship.

Leslie transferred to Sky in 2003, initially to work on coverage of the UEFA Champions League and soon after helped launch Football First in 2004. He commentated on the first "Game of the Day" between Bolton Wanderers and Charlton Athletic at the start of the 2004–2005 season.

Following the departure of Ian Crocker to Setanta Sports in the summer of 2006, Leslie took over the role as Sky's principal commentator on the Football League. He was also given the role of commentary on Sky Sports' now limited Scottish football output. He covers all Scotland's home matches and all Scottish Cup matches which Sky Sports show live. Key matches covered so far outside of the Premier League and UEFA Champions League are the 2007 Scottish Cup Final, Scotland's home victory over France in 2007 and the Championship Play-Off Finals from 2007 to 2016. He was also part of the commentary team for the UEFA Under-21 Championships in 2007.

Leslie's live Premier League debut for the Sky Sports corporation came in the clash between Birmingham City and Aston Villa in the 2004–2005 season. The match was shown on the now defunct Sky Sports PayPerView service PremPlus. He commentated on the first game of the Premier League season: Arsenal v West Bromwich Albion, and various other live matches. He has commentated on all of Celtic's UEFA Champions League games except those involving Manchester United.

Leslie can now most often be heard as lead commentator on Sky Sports coverage of the Premier League or EFL Championship.
