= Kass Naidoo =

South African sports broadcaster

- Born: Kasturi Naidoo; 12 January 1978 (age 48); Durban, Natal, South Africa
- Citizenship: South Africa
- Occupations: Cricket commentator, sports journalist
- Years active: 1996–present
- Spouse: Ryk Meiring (m. 2004)
- Children: 3
- Website: kassnaidoo.co.za

Kasturi "Kass" Naidoo (born 1978) is a South African cricket commentator. She is widely recognised as South Africa's first female television cricket commentator, having made her broadcasting debut during the 2003 Cricket World Cup for the South African Broadcasting Corporation (SABC). She is also the founder of the gsport Trust.

== Early life and education ==
Naidoo was born in Durban to Bugwathie and Sannasy Naidoo. Her family has origins in Visakhapatnam, Andhra Pradesh, India. She is the youngest of three children and has two older brothers. At the age of 14, she was inspired to pursue cricket commentary after hearing West Indian commentator Donna Symmonds during a series in South Africa. She attended the Durban University of Technology, where she earned a degree in journalism.

== Career ==
Naidoo began her career as a vacation reporter for The Mercury newspaper in 1996. She also worked briefly for the South African Press Association and as producer for John Robbie at 702. She later joined the SABC, where she worked as a writer on the news desk and edited sports stories. She made her television cricket presenting debut during the 2003 Cricket World Cup in South Africa, hosted by the SABC. She made her radio cricket commentary debut alongside Neil Manthorp during the Boxing Day Test between South Africa and the West Indies in December 2003. Her international commentary debut came at the 2006 Hong Kong Sixes.

In 2008, Naidoo joined Cricket South Africa (CSA) as Commercial and Corporate Relations Manager, where she worked on shaping the brands of CSA and the Proteas. She left CSA in 2012 to focus on her own projects.

In 2020, Naidoo commentated on the Pakistan Super League. In July 2021, she made her Sky Sports debut as a host of The Hundred. In December 2021, she made her SuperSport cricket commentary debut. She was part of the commentary panel for the 2023 Cricket World Cup in India, calling the opening match between England and New Zealand. She also commentated at the 2024 ICC Men's T20 World Cup and the 2025 ICC Women's Cricket World Cup.

In 2024, Naidoo received the Minister's Recognition of Excellence Award at the South African Sport Awards.

== Personal life ==
Naidoo married Ryk Meiring in 2004. They have three children, Daniel, Ella, and Luke. Her father, Sannasy, died in 2012.
