= Rob Moody =

Australian YouTuber and guitarist

- Born: Rob Moody; 23 November 1977 (age 48)
- Other name: Robelinda
- Occupations: YouTuber; editor; musician
- Spouse: Belinda

YouTube information
- Channel: robelinda2
- Years active: 2010–2023
- Genre: Sport
- Subscribers: 1.11 million
- Views: 3.7 billion
- Last updated: 10 February 2022

Rob Moody (born 23 November 1977) is an Australian YouTuber and cricket enthusiast. He is known for his collection of old cricket footage. His YouTube channel titled Robelinda2 is one of the largest cricket archival channels in the world, possibly larger than that of the International Cricket Council. He has been praised for his contributions to the growth of cricket. He had more than a million subscribers before his channel was terminated on 5 November 2023 after a series of copyright strikes. Following the termination of Robelinda2 in November 2023, a devoted fan of Rob Moody created a new YouTube channel named Robelinda 2 with the handle @robelinda6. The channel aimed to preserve and reupload much of Moody's 40-year archive of cricket footage that had been shared on Robelinda2. Over time, Robelinda6 became the de facto continuation of Moody's legacy, restoring access to rare and historic cricket clips for the global cricketing community.

Robelinda2 is also often deemed as the most sought-after YouTube cricket channel over the years. Some analysts, experts and critics consider him as someone who had contributed immensely to the prosperity and growth of cricket way beyond the efforts of global cricketing body, International Cricket Council. He is also considered as cricket's greatest librarian and also fondly remembered as cricket's YouTube hero. As of February 2022, he has approximately 1.01 million subscribers.

== Career ==
Moody developed the enthusiasm and the knack of recording live cricket matches which were broadcast on television virtually onto video tapes from his young age since the 1980s. Moody had recorded live cricket matches since the 1982–83 Australian cricket season, including the Ashes, at the age of five. Switching to DVDs from video tapes in the 1990s, he also converted them to hard disks. In the end, 300 videotapes, 25,000 DVDs and 60 hard drives amounted to 100 terabytes of footage. He initially started the idea of sharing archived videos on YouTube by uploading some random Sheffield Shield highlights on YouTube on the request of his online friend. Moody created his first YouTube channel, robelinda, on 7 November 2006, later opening a new channel called robelinda2, and uploading numerous Australian and international cricket clips. Many were from obscure matches not broadcast as television highlights. 90% of the views on his YouTube channel came from India. The video footage which he shared about the century scored by former Australian cricketer Greg Blewett against England in one of the test matches way back in 1998 was the first real breakthrough behind the origin story of his YouTube channel. The video he posted about David Saker’s half volley bouncer to Michael Vaughan in a test match on 10 November 2010 had raked the most number of YouTube views for any YouTube video on his channel.

His videos began to come under scrutiny over possible copyright violations. In March 2020, he received warnings from the International Cricket Council demanding that he delete the footage from any ICC event from 1992 onwards including the 1992 Cricket World Cup, 1996 Cricket World Cup, 1999 Cricket World Cup. 2002 ICC Champions Trophy, 2003 Cricket World Cup, 2004 ICC Champions Trophy and 2006 ICC Champions Trophy. They suggested that he delete just over 100 cricket videos, stating that they did not have any intention of closing his channel. On 16 June 2020, his cricket video library was temporarily shut down by Twitter, before Cricket Australia intervened.

Moody's videos became more popular especially during the COVID-19 pandemic when international cricket was halted. His YouTube channel grew by 200,000 subscribers and was viewed 249 million times during this period. His cricket related videos became more popular and viral among cricket fans especially during the onset of the pandemic when the international cricket was brought to a standstilll. As of 2021, his YouTube channel saw a rapid spike in subscribers and viewers with over 200, 000 subscribers and 249 million views for his videos since the pandemic induced lockdowns. ESPN Cricinfo journalist Daniel Brettig in a tweet quoted saying "This guy doesn't profit from what he has done, brilliantly for years. There is only global demand for what he does because the world's broadcasters and boards have failed miserably to do anything serious about making their archives available to public. A social media campaign was launched by Adam Collins and Geoff Lemon from The Final Word podcast, demanding an Order of Australia honour for him in recognition of his services to cricket. He insisted that he never intended to make and generate money out of the YouTube content and he insists that he uploads cricket videos solely with the intention of fun and entertainment purposes which he also considers as a side hustle, a dream passion and a hobby for time pass. He is a guitarist by profession and also teaches both electric guitar and acoustic steel-string guitar at the Modern Guitar Tuition in Box Hill, Melbourne. He also plays guitar and saxophone for Royal Caribbean cruises with The Australian INXS Show.

On 5 November 2023, his YouTube account was terminated after a series of copyright strikes, described by Fox Sports as being of questionable validity.
