= Harsha Bhogle =

Indian cricket commentator

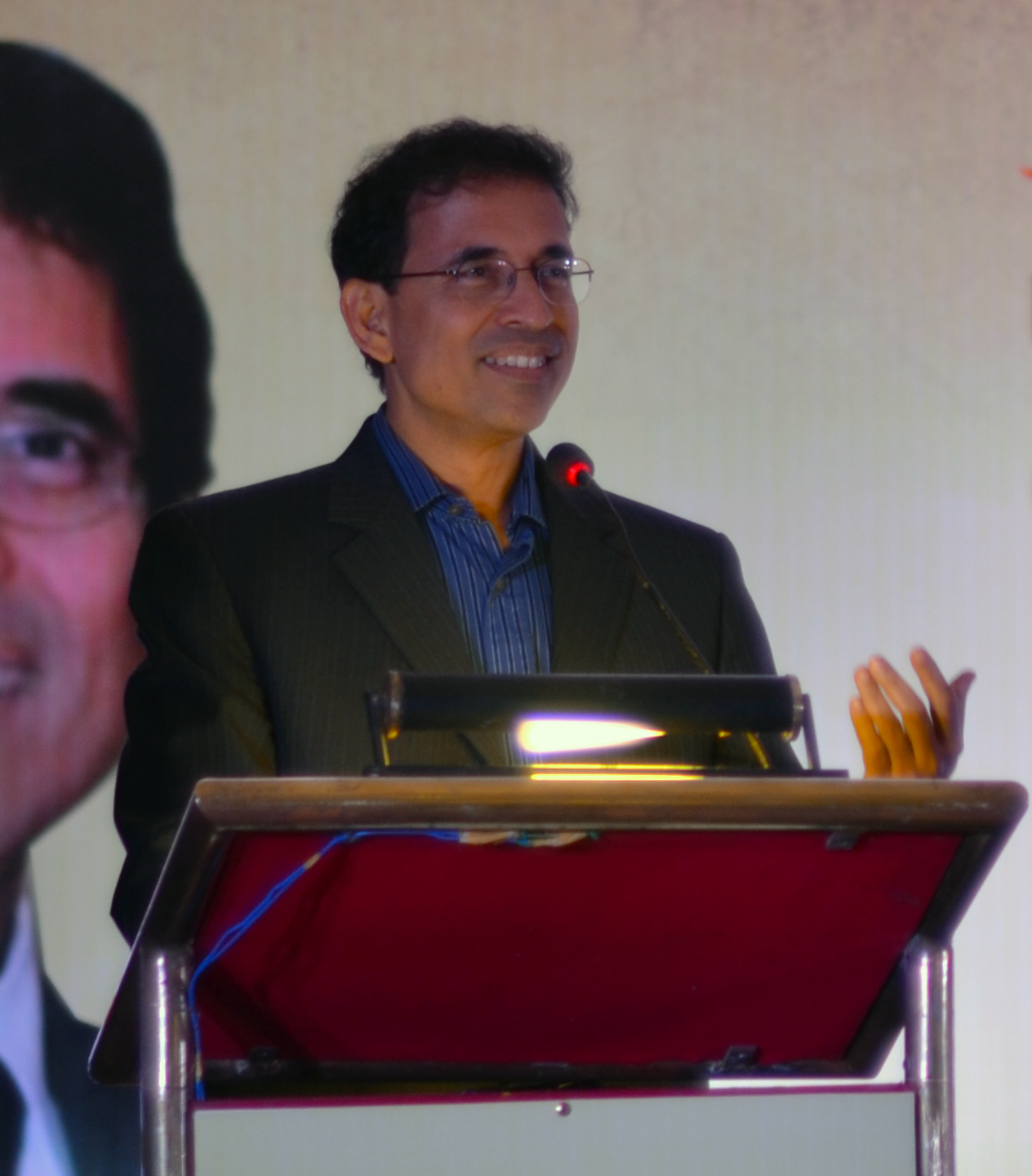
- Bhogle in October 2014
- Born: 19 July 1961 (age 65); Hyderabad, Andhra Pradesh (present–day Telangana), India
- Education: Osmania University, Hyderabad (B.Tech); IIM Ahmedabad (MBA)
- Occupations: TV commentator and presenter
- Spouse: Anita Bhogle
- Website: www.harshabhogle.com

Harsha Bhogle (born 19 July 1961) is an Indian cricket commentator and journalist.

== Early life ==
Bhogle was born into a Marathi-speaking family in Hyderabad. He is the son of Achyut D. Bhogle, a professor of French language, and Shalini Bhogle, a professor of psychology. During an interview with The Grade Cricketer podcast, Bhogle revealed that his mother's family was originally from Lahore and she migrated to India as a child during the partition, in the middle of 1947. He attended Hyderabad Public School, Begumpet, and subsequently earned a B.Tech degree in Chemical Engineering from Osmania University's College of Technology in Hyderabad. He received an MBA from IIM Ahmedabad. He then joined an advertising agency for which he worked for two and a half years, following which he served at a sports management company for an equal period.

== Career ==
Early on, Bhogle played A Div cricket for a long time in Hyderabad and represented Osmania University at the Rohinton Baria Tournament. He started commentating at the age of 19 with All India Radio, while living in Hyderabad. In 1991–92, he became the first Indian commentator to be invited by the Australian Broadcasting Corporation during India's cricket series before the 1992 Cricket World Cup. He has since worked for ABC Radio Grandstand during India's Australian tours, and for eight years worked for the BBC as part of their commentary team in the 1996 and the 1999 Cricket World Cups.

Since 1995, he has been presenting live cricket from all around the world for ESPN STAR Sports and was part of the commentary team that included Ravi Shastri, Sunil Gavaskar, and Alan Wilkins along with Geoff Boycott and Navjot Singh Sidhu, for a few seasons, and later, Ian Chappell and Sanjay Manjrekar.

He covered the 2011–12 series in Australia solely for ABC Radio.

Bhogle has been covering all Indian Premier League seasons since 2009. He was dropped from the commentary team by BCCI in April 2016. No official reason was given, but according to media reports, it was due to a combination of factors including criticism from Indian players and an incident during the opening game of the T20 World Cup where Bhogle's access between Hindi and English commentary boxes was restricted.

He has hosted television programs such as Harsha Online, Harsha Unplugged and School Quiz Olympiad for ESPN and Star Sports.

Bhogle had a television programme named after him, Harsha ki khoj (lit. 'Harsha's search'), that strove to find broadcasting talent in India.

Bhogle expanded his online presence by hosting Out of the Box with Harsha Bhogle on YouTube.

Bhogle was voted the favourite TV cricket commentator by ESPNcricinfo users based on a worldwide poll. Bhogle has also anchored BBC's travel serial Travel India and Business Today Acumen Business Quiz and Debate competitions.

Bhogle was the advisor to the Mumbai Indians for the 2008 IPL.

Bhogle has published and authored a number of books, including a biography of Mohammad Azharuddin and a collection of columns in The Indian Express, Out of the Box – Watching the Game We Love and is also a columnist for the Chennai-based "The Sportstar" a subsidiary of The Hindu group of Publications under the title "Hitting Hard" by Bhogle. (2009). Bhogle has presented the program Travel India: With Harsha Bhogle on the Discovery channel and TLC.

In the 2011 World Cup held in India, Sri Lanka and Bangladesh, he anchored the pre and post match shows that featured Simon Hughes, Navjot Singh Sidhu, Sunil Gavaskar, Tony Greig and Sourav Ganguly.

In 2013, he was given the seat in commentary by Ian Bishop to conduct the final interviews when Sachin Tendulkar played his final test.

Bhogle currently hosts a weekly show called "This Week's Special" aired on Star Sports. The show takes the viewers back in time to make them relive cricketing memories from the past. The first episode was aired from 1 October 2015. On 10 April 2016 His IPL contract as a commentator was terminated. The decision came as a surprise for the voice of Indian cricket since he had conducted the Season 9 draft auction, featured in the league's promotional videos, was in the commentators’ 51-day-long duty roster, and even had his flight booked by the production house. Board (BCCI) officials said Bhogle had an angry exchange with a cricket official at the venue as he wanted him to open the door, and this reached the Nagpur-based BCCI president Shashank Manohar. Those in the know said this incident was the trigger that resulted in Bhogle losing out.

He has been a part of Times Group subsidiary Cricbuzz since 2016 and writes articles as well as doing video analyses with them.

Bhogle is currently one of the Board of Governors of IIM Udaipur.

On 16 May 2019, he was named among the 24 commentators for the 2019 ICC World Cup held in England and Wales.

During the 2nd test of Bangladesh's tour of India, the 1st D/N test of both Indian and Bangladeshi cricket teams, a few Bangladeshi batsmen were struck by the pink ball. Bhogle raised concerns about the visibility of the ball, with Sanjay Manjrekar, his fellow commentator, replying that only people like Bhogle would need to ask such questions as they have not played at that level. This on-air spat raised many eyebrows.

== Books ==
Bhogle and his wife Anita have written books titled The Winning Way and The Winning Way 2.0 based on their business knowledge drawn from the sporting world. He has also authored a biography of Mohammad Azharuddin, and published a collection of articles in a book called Out of the Box.

=== The Winning Way ===
The Winning Way
- Author: Harsha Bhogle, Anita Bhogle
- Language: English
- Subject: Cricket
- Genre: Sports Management
- Publisher: Westland And Tranquebar Press
- English publication date: 1 May 2011
- Pages: 226
- ISBN: 978-9380658322

The Winning Way is a 2011 debut book by Harsha Bhogle and Anita Bhogle, published by Westland And Tranquebar Press. It is Harsha's first book published as an author. The pair stated that the book took them two years to write, with The Hindu calling it "lively".

The Winning Way is a management advice book that focuses on what comprises a successful athlete and shows how management teams could apply that to their work force. The Hindu reviewed the book, calling it a "right pick as a playbook for managers." Business Today praised the book, saying it "captures the essence of values in sport, values that make champion players and champion teams".

== Personal life ==
Bhogle is married to Anita, his classmate from IIM Ahmedabad, and they live in Mumbai with their two adult sons. Bhogle has been a vegetarian since age 17.

The couple run a sport-based communication consultancy called Prosearch.
