= Alan Wilkins (cricketer) =

Welsh cricketer and commentator

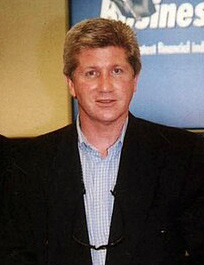

Personal information
- Born: 22 August 1953 (age 73); Cardiff, Wales
- Batting: Right-handed
- Bowling: Left-arm medium
- Role: All-rounder

Career statistics
Competition	First-class	List A
Matches	107	104
Runs scored	902	153
Batting average	9.49	6.62
100s/50s	0/2	0/0
Top score	70	27
Balls bowled	14,095	4368
Wickets	243	130
Bowling average	30.90	22.91
5 wickets in innings	9	3
10 wickets in match	0	0
Best bowling	8/57	5/17
Catches/stumpings	34/–	14/–
- Source: CricketArchive, 18 October 2021

Alan Haydn Wilkins (born 22 August 1953) is a Welsh cricket commentator and former county cricketer, who played for Glamorgan and Gloucestershire County Cricket Clubs. He was a left-arm medium-pace bowler, who took almost 400 wickets between 1976 and 1983, before retiring due to a severe shoulder injury. He also made one appearance for Bristol Rugby against Abertillery in 1980.

== Post-cricket career ==
Wilkins moved into radio and television broadcasting, initially with the South African Broadcasting Corporation based in Johannesburg, where he became Editor Sport of the English Radio Service of the SABC (1984 to 1987). In 1986–87 he was the recipient of three broadcasting awards: the SAB Radio Sports Journalist of the Year, the B & H Radio Commentator of the Year and the Nissan Media Man of the Year, with specific reference to his cricket and rugby commentaries for the SABC.

Wilkins moved back to Wales in September 1987 to take up a presenting position with BBC Wales in radio and television, anchoring the Rugby Special Wales series (later to become known as "Scrum V") BBC Grandstand Wales, all of the BBC Wales rugby output and cricket programming, which included Glamorgan's home matches. He went on to commentate on BBC Network rugby and cricket.

In 1994, Alan Wilkins was asked by the SABC to host the coverage of the 1994 South Africa cricket tour to England, the country's first tour to England since 1965. He returned to South Africa in 1995 to commentate on the 1995 Rugby World Cup for the SABC, which included the controversial semi-final in Durban between South Africa and France. He then flew straight back to London to host the 1995 Wimbledon Championships for the SABC.

Still based with BBC Wales, but now not on a formal contract, Wilkins was asked to be a commentator on the 1996 Indian cricket tour of England, which was the start of his association with the television company ESPN Star Sports (ESS) based in Singapore.

In 1997, Wilkins was one of the lead commentators for M-Net SuperSport in South Africa for the 1997 British and Irish Lions Rugby Tour. Later that year, Wilkins joined the ESPN commentary team in India for the One Day International series between India and Sri Lanka. He was part of the ESPN Star Sports commentary team, known as A Few Good Men which included Ravi Shastri, Sunil Gavaskar, Navjot Singh Sidhu, Harsha Bhogle and Geoffrey Boycott. He has been based in Singapore since February 2000. His television portfolio includes India's cricket tours, all ICC World events and the Champions League Twenty20.

By 1999, his work with BBC Wales had ended, though he continued to appear on British TV for a while longer, and worked as a cricket reporter and sports bulletin reader for BBC Radio 5 Live. He featured prominently in ITV's coverage of the 1999 Rugby World Cup, and the following season, he hosted HTV Wales's weekly rugby union programme, The Front Row.

He has hosted and commentated on Wimbledon since 1996 and with former Indian tennis star Vijay Amritraj since 1998. Wilkins and Amritraj's tennis duties also extend to the Australian Open. In golf, he hosts ESPN Star Sports' coverage of the Masters from Augusta, Georgia and covered all Asian Tour events and co-sanctioned events with Europe between 2004 and 2009.

Wilkins hosted the 2013 ISPS Handa World Cup of Golf for the US PGA Tour World Feed Commentary from Royal Melbourne Golf Club, alongside Ian Baker-Finch, Brett Ogle, Ossie Moore and Ewan Porter.

In 2013 and 2014 Wilkins was one of the commentary teams for the Indian Premier League. He was on the commentary team for IPL 2015, and in 2018, he hosted the 'Kent Cricket Live' IPL show on Star Sports. Since 2015, Wilkins has been part of the commentary team for Indian Premier League.

In 2018 he published his memoirs, Easier Said Than Done: A Life in Sport.

In March 2024, he was appointed as the president of Glamorgan County Cricket Club on a three-year term.
