= Stuart Pyke =

British sports journalist

Stuart Pyke (born 8 July 1961) is an English sports journalist and broadcaster.

He is now most well known for his darts and rugby league commentary on Sky Sports and rugby league commentary on BBC Radio 5 Live. He also writes for the Daily Telegraph, Sunday Express and the website of darts equipment manufacturer, Unicorn.

== Early career ==
Pyke started commentating on sports back in 1984, when he joined Piccadilly Radio in Manchester, after a four-year grounding on local newspapers. He commentated on Oldham Athletic's football matches during their most successful era, when they reached the League Cup Final and won promotion to the Premier League. During his time at Piccadilly Radio Stuart also commentated on Rugby League matches often combining commentary with programme presentation from the ground he was at.

He then moved on to become the Cricket Correspondent for Independent Radio News, covering England tours to Australia, New Zealand, South Africa and the West Indies. He also covered Rugby League and was the first man to cover a Great Britain Lions Tour for the Independent Radio network in 1988, when Great Britain were in Australia and New Zealand.

In 1998, Pyke moved into television sport and for five years he covered the North West region for Sky Sports News.

== Later career ==
Stuart has commentated on many Rugby League Challenge Cup Finals, Super League Grand Finals and Great Britain test matches during his career. Since 2002 he has been heard regularly on BBC Radio 5 Live and its digital companion station BBC Radio 5 Sports Extra covering Rugby League and other sports.

Pyke joined the Sky Sports team at the 2003 World Matchplay tournament. His first match, with Sid Waddell, was between Keith Deller and John Lowe. Since then, he has been involved in nearly every major Professional Darts Corporation event live on Sky Sports, ITV4, ESPN, PDC.TV at Championship League Darts, US Open with South African Masters in 2007 and 2008 on Nuts TV and Challenge TV.
