= Andy Burton (TV presenter) =

British sports commentator

Andy Burton is a talent agent and former pitchside reporter and commentator, best known as a touchline reporter for Sky Sports. He has worked for Capital Radio and Bravo. He hit the headlines after assaulting presenter Richard Bacon in a dispute over his ex-girlfriend in 2007. He was the main commentator on Bravo's Football Challenge joined by Andy Goldstein. He commentated for Sky Sports, on Premiership football matches shown in their Saturday evening highlights show, Football First.

On 25 January 2011, Burton was suspended by Sky due to his involvement in the sexist comments made about a female assistant referee, Sian Massey, which also involved Andy Gray and Richard Keys. However, unlike Gray and Keys, Burton later returned to his regular duties at Sky.

He was a scout at AFC Bournemouth for less than a season.

In 2021, Burton founded Gen-Z Sports and Media Group, a talent management agency for sportspeople and celebrities.
