= Sian Massey-Ellis =

English football referee

Sian Massey-Ellis MBE
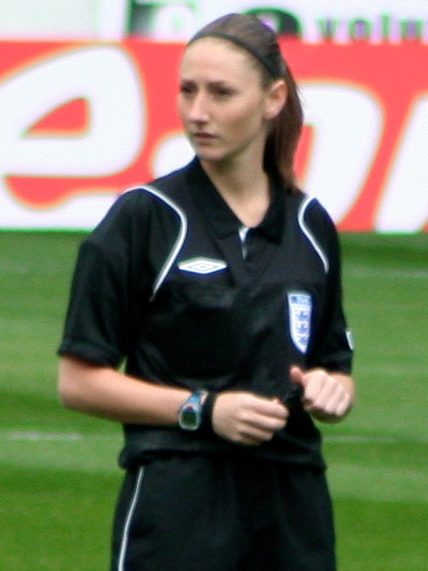
- Massey-Ellis in 2011
- Full name: Sian Louise Massey-Ellis
- Born: Sian Louise Massey; 5 October 1985 (age 41); Coventry, England
- Other occupation: School teacher

Domestic
Years	League	Role
2008–2026	Premier League	Assistant Referee

International
Years	League	Role
2009–2026	FIFA listed	Assistant Referee

Sian Louise Massey-Ellis MBE (née Massey; born 5 October 1985) is a former English football match official who officiated generally in the role of assistant referee in the Premier League and the Football League. She was also appointed to matches in the Football League Trophy, UEFA Women's Champions League, FIFA Women's World Cup qualification rounds, the FIFA Women's World Cup and the UEFA Europa League. Massey-Ellis was appointed to the FIFA list of women assistant referees in 2009 and turned professional in 2010.

She is based in Coventry, West Midlands.

== Career ==
=== Domestic career ===
In May 2009, Massey-Ellis was appointed fourth official for the year's FA Women's Cup final at Derby County's Pride Park Stadium, a game which saw two injury-time goals and Arsenal defeat Sunderland 2–1. In the 2009–10 men's season Massey was fourth official in five matches and assistant referee in 11 matches. Her first appointment as an assistant referee was on 29 August 2009, a 2–2 draw between Hereford United and Port Vale.

On 11 February 2010, Massey-Ellis refereed the season's FA Women's Premier League Cup final between Leeds Carnegie and Everton at Rochdale's Spotland Stadium. Massey was required to interpret two notable incidents; she disallowed a third first-half goal for Leeds for a foul on Everton's goalkeeper and disregarded Everton's late first-half appeal for a penalty kick. Leeds won the match 3–1, winning the cup for the first time since its inaugural 1991–92 season.

Massey-Ellis turned professional in March 2010, joining the Professional Game Match Officials List (PGMOL), who provide the officials for men's Premier League matches, the highest level of professional football in England. Her first Premier League appointment was on 28 December 2010, as an assistant in Blackpool's 2–0 away win at Sunderland.

During a game between Cardiff City and Middlesbrough in May 2011, Massey was knocked over by Cardiff player Kevin McNaughton, although the incident was said, officially by the FA, to be an accident.

In August 2011, Massey-Ellis was appointed to the Select Group of match officials.

Massey-Ellis was appointed Member of the Order of the British Empire (MBE) in the 2017 New Year Honours for services to football.

In August 2026, Massey-Ellis announced her retirement from officiating, taking up a position at the Football Association.

==== Sexism controversy ====
After her second Premier League game, as an assistant in Liverpool's 3–0 win at Wolverhampton Wanderers on 22 January 2011, a sexism controversy erupted over remarks made about Massey-Ellis by staff of the Premier League broadcaster Sky Sports, which led to commentator Andy Gray and presenter Richard Keys being sacked. Reporter Andy Burton was suspended. Massey-Ellis was withdrawn by the PGMOL from her next appointment, a League 2 game between Crewe Alexandra and Bradford City on 25 January, as they believed the added attention Massey might receive could detract from the match itself. The PGMOL also withdrew her for a second time, from a Conference North game between Corby Town and Eastwood Town on 29 January, with Corby stating there had been huge demand for television access when it was announced Massey was to referee the game. Massey returned to the line on 5 February for a League 2 match between Chesterfield and Aldershot Town, and was then appointed to her third Premier League fixture on 12 February between Blackpool and Aston Villa, as an assistant to Howard Webb.

Massey-Ellis was the subject of censorship by Iranian state TV broadcasters when she was an assistant referee for a 12 April 2021 Premier League game between Manchester United and Tottenham. The Islamic Republic of Iran Broadcasting reportedly cut away from the game more than 100 times in order to avoid showing her legs, showing outdoor footage of London instead. Massey-Ellis was wearing shorts, and women are required to cover their legs and hair in public by Iranian law. Activist group My Stealthy Freedom publicly complained about the censorship. The channel allegedly had previously cancelled showing a 2019 match between Augsburg and Bayern Munich because a female referee would be officiating, and edited a broadcast of the 2018 FIFA World Cup draw announcement due to co-host Maria Komandnaya.

=== International career ===
Massey-Ellis's early international career has included involvement in the 2007 FIFA Women's World Cup by taking up the role of fourth official for England's 4–0 qualification stage win over Austria on 20 April 2006. In September 2007 Massey was assistant referee at England Women's 2–1 international friendly defeat by Denmark Women. She was also an assistant referee for the qualification stage of UEFA Women's Euro 2009.

Her involvement in the qualification stage for the Women's World Cup increased for the 2011 edition of the competition, taking up the role of assistant referee for Norway's 2–0 win over Ukraine, Sweden's 1–0 away victory over the Czech Republic in Prague and Belgium's 11–0 home win over Azerbaijan.

In June 2017, Massey-Ellis was appointed to be an assistant referee for the UEFA Women's Euro 2017 in the Netherlands.

In May 2018 Massey-Ellis was appointed as an assistant in the 2018 UEFA Women's Champions League Final.

On 3 December 2018, Massey-Ellis was appointed to be an assistant referee at the 2019 FIFA Women's World Cup in France.

On 24 October 2019, Massey-Ellis was appointed to her first Men's International fixture in a 0–0 draw between PSV Eindhoven and LASK in the UEFA Europa League.

Massey-Ellis stepped down as an on-field FIFA official at the end of December 2024, however she remains a FIFA Video Assistant Referee.

== See also ==
- List of FIFA international referees
- Amy Fearn, first female Football League referee
- Wendy Toms, first female Football League and Premier League assistant referee
