= Ian Crocker (commentator) =

British association football commentator

- Born: 1965 (age 60–61)
- Education: Broadway Secondary School
- Occupation: Association football commentator

Ian Crocker (born 1965) is a British association football commentator who works for Sky Sports.

== Early life and education ==
Crocker grew up in the small village of Sutton Poyntz near Weymouth in Dorset and attended Broadway Secondary School.

== Career ==
Prior to his television career, Crocker served as stadium announcer for West Ham United F.C. home matches at the Boleyn Ground during the mid-1980s. He then commentated for Capital Gold in London, alongside Jonathan Pearce and Steve Wilson (who are both now BBC commentators). He then spent several years with BRMB in Birmingham commentating on Aston Villa and Birmingham City. During this period, Crocker began providing occasional commentaries for BSkyB. He covered some live Premier League matches during Sky's first season of coverage 1992/93, before joining permanently in 1997.

After joining Sky, Crocker commentated regularly on Premier League matches, but was best known for his four years (1998–2002) as the voice of Scottish football, covering live matches from the Scottish Premier League, Scottish Cup and Scottish internationals. After Sky lost the rights to the SPL, Crocker became Sky's chief Football League commentator between 2002 and 2006.

Although being given occasional live Premier League matches between 2005 and 2006, Crocker was clearly behind the Sky "Big Four" of Martin Tyler, Rob Hawthorne, Alan Parry and Ian Darke in the commentating pecking order. As a result, Crocker left Sky to progress his career with Setanta Sports, working for them during the following three years. Crocker was Setanta's lead commentator on the SPL, and also shared commentating duties with Jon Champion on Setanta's 46 'live' Premier League games.

Setanta went into administration in June 2009 and the UK side of their broadcasting operations was wound up soon after. Crocker went freelance and spent the next season (2009–2010) working for a variety of different outlets. Setanta's sports rights were carved up, with some of the SPL matches returning to Sky, and Crocker was contracted to be Sky's SPL commentator again, seven years after he had previously fulfilled the role. Crocker also worked on UEFA Champions League matches for STV who produced their own in-house coverage, with separate commentary and presentation, of the same matches shown on ITV1. Crocker was also contracted to work for ITV1 on their FA Cup Highlights shows, as well as being heard by an international audience commentating on Premier League matches for Premier League Productions.

Crocker travelled to South Africa for the 2010 World Cup where he was ITV's fourth commentator, covering two matches live and several other matches for their highlights shows, including Switzerland's defeat of Spain, and Portugal's 7–0 victory over North Korea.

In September 2010, it was announced that Ian Darke was leaving Sky Sports to join ESPN America as their leading football commentator. Crocker was subsequently re-signed by Sky Sports on a permanent basis as an integral part of their football commentating line-up. Crocker is the lead commentator for Sky Sports coverage of Scottish football and also provides commentary for the Premier League Productions World feed.

In June 2026, he has been covering the matches for the Fox Broadcasting Company of the 2026 FIFA World Cup being held in North America.
