= Adam Collins =

Australian cricket journalist

- Born: Adam Collins; Dandenong, Victoria, Australia
- Occupations: Cricket journalist and sports commentator
- Years active: 2015–present
- Children: 2
- Website: finalwordcricket.com

Adam Collins is an Australian cricket journalist, author, and broadcaster. He was named the 2020 Cricket Writers' Club Christopher Martin-Jenkins Broadcaster of the Year. In 2024, Collins co-authored Glenn Maxwell's autobiography.

== Early life ==
Collins attended Lyndale Secondary College in North Dandenong before completing his final year of secondary school as an exchange student at East Aurora High School in Western New York. It was whilst studying Politics & History at Monash University that he first became involved in the Labor Party, joining the staff of Tim Holding MP whilst still a student.

== Political career ==
Collins worked as a media advisor to Australian Prime Minister Kevin Rudd and was on the staff of federal treasurer Wayne Swan. He also worked on the London 2012 Olympic Games and 2012 Paralympic Games organising committees.

== Journalism ==
=== Author ===
Adam co-authored Australian cricketer Glenn Maxwell's autobiography "The Showman". The book received critical acclaim from prolific author and journalist Gideon Haigh, who stated, "The good thing is that Maxwell chose his co-author, Adam Collins, and editor, Geoff Lemon, wisely. They are badgers after his own heart. And for all Maxwell’s mercurial temperament and finger-tip feel for the game, he is disarmingly good at describing how he’s done what he’s done, and how he does what he does. Want to hear about his double-century against Afghanistan? You won’t get a better account than Maxwell’s own. It’s like having Phar Lap talk you through the 1930 Melbourne Cup. About Maxwell’s doubts and setbacks, meanwhile, the co-authors have shown commendable candour"

=== Print ===
After trialling working in journalism in 2015 and then going full time, Collins has written for publications such as Cricbuzz, The Cricket Paper, The Evening Standard, The Independent, ABC, The Daily Telegraph, the Cricinfo website and Wisden Cricket Monthly. Collins won the 2017 NRMA Kennedy Award for Outstanding Sports Reporting for a David Warner front page exclusive in the Sydney Morning Herald in which, during a pay dispute, Warner revealed Cricket Australia would not have a team for the upcoming Ashes series if they did not meet the players demands. For The Guardian in 2019 Collins wrote the story in which Nat Sciver and Katherine Brunt came out. In the 2019 edition of the Wisden Almanack Collins wrote the essay honouring Tammy Beaumont being named a Wisden Cricketer of the Year.

=== Broadcasting ===
Collins initially cut his teeth on radio via the short lived cult classic show 'Believe The Hype' on Melbourne's SYNFM 90.7. Collins had helped create the guerilla cricket commentary website White Line Wireless with Geoff Lemon, amongst others, which Collins described as “alternative, quite sweary and silly”. In 2018 however, with no official broadcaster taking them, Collins bought the radio rights to the Australian national cricket team Test match series against Pakistan for a five-figure sum. He hired Geoff Lemon as a co-commentator, with Brendan Julian, Mike Hussey and Bazid Khan as pundits, and struck a deal to stream the commentary on the Wisden website. Collins said to the Sports Gazette “I realised I had the means at my disposal, albeit on the credit card, I’m not going to pretend I’m wealthy, I’m not. I knew there was a way of monetising it, commercialising it. I had a confidence we’d be able to secure the money back once we got the rights and once we had paid for all the talent, which was a very expensive process with my limited amount of money.” Collins has since continued to call ball by ball cricket commentaries for the likes of Talksport, Middlesex County Cricket Club, Test Match Special, and has also called international cricket in West Indies, Sri Lanka, and Bangladesh. For Sky Television in the UK, Collins has commented on men’s and Women's Test cricket and One Day Internationals, whilst also featuring as a guest on Sky television shows such as Cricket Writers on TV, The Debate & The Cricket Show, as well as BBC Breakfast and BBC News. Collins was part of the world feed commentary team for the 2017 Women's Cricket World Cup and for ABC Radio Grandstand for the 2017 Border-Gavaskar Trophy series. With Cricbuzz, Collins has been hosting video analysis since 2018 Harsha Bhogle and Michael Vaughan. In 2018 Collins was on for 1116 SEN as the 2018 Australian ball-tampering scandal unfolded. In 2019 Collins and Geoff Lemon made a short mockumentary entitled The Holy Ground about Ben Stokes trip to Mbargo nightclub in Bristol. In 2019 Collins was commenting for SEN on the denouement to the 2019 Cricket World Cup Final at Lord's between England and New Zealand which he described as a career highlight. Collins was named the 2020 Cricket Writers' Club Christopher Martin-Jenkins Broadcaster of the Year.

=== Podcasts ===
Collins co-hosts The Final Word Podcast with Geoff Lemon. In 2020, the Wisden Almanack recognised The Final Word as the best cricket podcast in the world. He has also guested on the Sky Sports Cricket Podcast. In 2020 Collins co-hosted, with Daniel Norcross, a 6-part documentary series on the history of cricket commentary called Calling the Shots which was made for the Pinch Hitter, which was a pop-up digital mag made during the COVID-19 pandemic. He also co-hosted The Greatest Season That Was with Daniel Brettig and Shannon Gill. The 2021 Wisden Almanack fulsomely praised Collins work describing Calling The Shots as “a slick history of cricket broadcasting that revealed, with Reithian ideals, everything from Brian Johnston’s conflict with Andy Pandy to Cricinfo’s battles with bankruptcy, and Big Brother. It cemented Collins’s standing as the doyen: his other shows, The Final Word (with Geoff Lemon) and The Greatest Season That Was (with Dan Brettig and Shannon Gill) maintained exceptional standards." The podcast was nominated for Sports Podcast of the Year at the 2026 Sports Book Awards.

== Personal life ==
Collins is a supporter of Hawthorn Football Club. He commented on the positive impact watching Victoria and Australia cricketer Dean Jones had on him as a youngster. Aged 18, Collins drove to the Australian Cricket Board’s headquarters to complain about the dropping of Mark Waugh from the test team. He now lives in North London with partner Rachel and daughters Winnie and Peggy. He is a relative of Australian novelist Joseph Furphy and Collins' father changed the family surname to Collins because Tom Collins was the pen name Furphy used. As well as being a member of the Australian Labor Party and British Labour Party Collins is a former chairman of the Victorian branch of the Australian Republic Movement.
