= Premier League on NBC =

Soccer coverage on United States television

- Presented by: Rebecca Lowe; Cara Banks; Anna Jackson; Ahmed Fareed; Paul Burmeister
- Starring: Robbie Earle; Robbie Mustoe; Tim Howard; Danny Higginbotham; Joe Prince-Wright
- Voices of: Peter Drury; Jon Champion; Lee Dixon; Graeme Le Saux
- Country of origin: United States
- Original language: English

Production
- Production companies: NBC Sports (2013–present); USA Sports (2025–present)

Original release
- Network: Comcast; NBC (2013–present); NBCSN (2013–2021 and 2025–present); Peacock (2021–present); Versant; USA Network (2022–present)
- Release: 2013 – present

The Premier League on NBC/Peacock is the blanket title for broadcasts of the Premier League by Peacock and the linear networks of NBC Sports. NBC acquired rights to the Premier League in 2013, and reached a six-year extension in 2015. In 2022, USA Network replaced NBCSN—which shut down on December 31, 2021—as the main cable broadcaster of the league.

== History ==
NBC acquired rights to the Premier League in 2013, replacing Fox Sports and ESPN. NBC's studio programming for the league includes the pre-match show Premier League Live, and the highlights shows Premier League Goal Zone and Match of the Day (modeled upon the similar BBC series). NBC Sports president of programming Jon Miller explained that their main goal was to not "Americanize" their coverage (besides providing explanations of terminology unfamiliar to U.S. viewers, such as referring to regional rivalries as "derbies"), citing their decision to employ talent (such as former ESPN UK and BBC Sport presenter Rebecca Lowe, who became NBC's lead host) who "know the Premier League and can talk about it intelligently". In 2014, NBC also hired the duo of Michael Davies and Roger Bennett—the "Men in Blazers"—to provide soccer-oriented content across NBC Sports' platforms.

Through the 2016–17 season, NBCSN offered part-time overflow channels branded as "Premier League Extra Time", which aired matches not shown by other NBC networks. In the 2017–18 season, these matches were moved to a new subscription-based streaming service known as "Premier League Pass" on NBC Sports Gold.

On Survival Sunday, the majority of NBCUniversal networks (including several not normally devoted to sports) broadcast matches on television under the banner Championship Sunday. Since 2020, NBCUniversal's streaming service Peacock has increasingly been used to broadcast overflow matches on Survival Sunday.

=== Integration with Sky Sports, Peacock ===
In 2019, NBCUniversal parent company Comcast acquired the British telecom and media conglomerate Sky plc. As a result, the NBC Sports division became a sibling to Sky Sports, a domestic rightsholder of the Premier League in the UK. Sky began to synergize with NBC Sports throughout 2019, beginning with a collaboration with its reporters for coverage of the transfer deadline, and adding a weekday simulcast from its Sky Sports News channel to the daytime lineup of NBCSN.

On-air collaboration with Sky Sports intensified with the beginning of the 2019–20 season; as Sky holds the first pick of matches for 12:30 p.m. (Eastern Time) kickoffs under its renewed contract, NBC will be able to air more prominent matches in its early-afternoon broadcasts. NBC also aired studio coverage of the first weekend of the season from Sky's studios, implemented a new on-air graphics package with elements of those used by Sky and its Premier League telecasts, and expanded its Sunday pre-match show to two hours (taking advantage of Sunday kickoffs being pushed later by half an hour). Sky Sports studio programming (including Soccer Saturday and Goals on Sunday among others) also became available on a secondary tier of Premier League Pass.

On July 9, 2020, NBC announced that Premier League Pass would be phased out, with its content (including non-televised matches and on-demand replays) being moved to Peacock Premium going forward, including 175 matches per-season. To mark the national launch of Peacock, all July 15, 2020, matches were carried exclusively by the service for free.

In July 2021, NBC announced that all matches on the NBC broadcast network will be simulcast on Peacock, and that noted Spanish football voice Andrés Cantor will call selected matches in English for NBC.

When the contract went up for renewal in 2021, the Premier League split its U.S. media rights into four packages (as it does with its domestic rights) to pursue the possibility of multiple broadcasters. On November 18, 2021, NBC Sports confirmed that it had reached a six-year extension of its exclusive rights to the Premier League through 2028. With NBCSN being discontinued at the end of 2021, USA Network would subsume its role as the main English-language cable outlet for NBC Sports' coverage. Ahead of the 2022–23 season, various reports said NBC appointed Peter Drury as the Premier League lead commentator to replace Arlo White, who filled the position for nine years. His position was confirmed on July 6, 2022.

On 18 June 2023, it was announced that Drury would join Sky Sports, doing one game a week on Sunday, Monday, or midweek. Soon, NBC hired Jon Champion to replace Drury for these match days, with Drury continuing that role for Saturday 12:30 pm ET games.

==== Partnership with USA Sports ====
On November 12, 2025, USA Sports would be reformed by Versant, formed after NBCUniversal spun off most of their cable business. USA Sports would receive USA Network's portion of the Premier League schedule beginning in 2026, other games will continue to air on NBC and Peacock. Starting on November 17, 2025, Premier League games will return to the relaunched NBCSN, for the first time after a four-year hiatus.

== List of personalities ==
NBC Sports personalities:

- Studio hosts: Rebecca Lowe, Cara Banks, Anna Jackson, Ahmed Fareed, Paul Burmeister
- Studio analysts: Robbie Earle, Robbie Mustoe, Tim Howard, Danny Higginbotham, Stephen Warnock, Gary Neville, Phil Neville
- Play-by-play announcers: Peter Drury, Jon Champion, Joe Speight, Andrés Cantor
- Color commentators: Lee Dixon, Graeme Le Saux, Stephen Warnock, Jim Beglin
- Contributor: Joe Prince-Wright, David Ornstein

Premier League Productions World Feed personalities:

- Studio hosts: Steve Bower, Manish Bhasin, Julia Stuart, Seema Jaswal
- Studio analysts: Alan Shearer, Ian Wright, Michael Owen, Tim Sherwood, Steve McManaman, Glenn Hoddle, Owen Hargreaves, Karen Carney, Fara Williams
- Play-by-play announcers: Jim Proudfoot, Chris Wise, Daniel Mann, Conor McNamara, Martin Tyler, Jon Champion, Steve Wilson, Pete Odgers, Ian Darke
- Color commentators: Jim Beglin, Matt Holland, Andy Townsend, Leroy Rosenior

Sky Sports World Feed (Saturday 3pm BST Games) personalities:

- Play-by-play announcers: Tony Jones, Ian Crocker, Gary Taphouse, Phil Blacker, David Stowell, Rob Palmer, Seb Hutchinson, Andy Bishop, Gary Weaver, Jonathan Beck, Pien Meulensteen, Jacqui Oatley
- Color commentators: Garry Birtles, Leon Osman, Andy Walker, Keith Andrews, Tony Gale, Robert Green, Matthew Upson, Efan Ekoku, David Provan, Courtney Sweetman-Kirk, Izzy Christiansen
