= Le Championnat (TV series) =

French television program

Le Championnat is a former TV programme on Channel 4. It used to be on Sunday at 7am but it was switched to Saturday and it showed the previous week's action on the current show until the end of the season when it went off air. In the last week of the season it showed the action the following week. In 2007, an alternative programme called 'Goalissimo' came on to Channel 4. French football action is shown on this programme. Since then French Football highlights have moved to five.

== Reporters ==
During the 04/05 season coverage, Gabriel Clarke narrated/reported on the action. He was not able to do every single week so he was replaced on occasions by Dave Beckett and Marcus Buckland.

== Commentators ==
The commentators for French Football are Steve Banyard and Richard Kaufman. Banyard took up the role of commentating on two games with Kaufman doing the third main match of the round. Occasionally, Tony Jones has commentated on games, as has Dan O'Hagan, who is often heard commentating for the BBC on Premier League football.

== Co-Commentators ==
In January 2006, the commentators were joined by a co-commentator. They were Efan Ekoku, former Wimbledon FC and Nigeria striker, Stewart Robson (a former Arsenal FC player and cricketer), David Pleat (former Tottenham Hotspur caretaker boss) and Tony Cascarino (a former Ireland international striker). Cascarino was the first co-commentator to be involved with a game. Alongside Steve Banyard, Tony helped out Banyard, in AC Ajaccio's 3–1 victory over Marseille.

== Music ==
Introduction-

Goal of the Season-

Round-up of games-

Transfers: January 2006-
