= Fort Boyard =

Fort Boyard can refer to:

- Fort Boyard (fortification)
- Fort Boyard (game show), a game show set in the aforementioned fort, which first premiered in France in 1990
  - Fort Boyard (British game show), the British version of the game show, which was aired from 1998 to 2003
  - Fort Boyard: Ultimate Challenge, a joint US-UK 2011 production
