= Premier League Productions =

Sports media company

Premier League Productions is an IMG-produced company with studio shows and commentators for worldwide viewers of Premier League association football.

== English-language broadcast team ==
The company has a group of UK based commentators, pundits, and presenters. Formerly, John Dykes led the presentation team between 2010 and 2017. Currently Steve Bower (lead), Seema Jaswal and Julia Stuart present Premier League Live (formerly Matchday Live) on weekends with other presenters such as Olivia Buzaglo, Ian Irving, Will Perry and Kelly Somers filling in as needed. Anita Nneka Jones (among others) contribute as presenters for studio shows. Different guest pundits appear on each programme including Michael Owen (lead), Alan Shearer, Ian Wright, Owen Hargreaves, Glenn Hoddle, Steve McManaman, Tim Sherwood, Karen Carney, Izzy Christiansen, Rachel Corsie, Lianne Sanderson and Fara Williams.

Studio show presenters (2025-2026 season):

All times listed are London Time - UTC+1 from last Sunday in March through Saturday before last Sunday in October, UTC otherwise

Fantasy Premier League Show - Fridays 10:30 LIVE

- Kelly Somers (primary)
- Ian Irving
- Olivia Buzaglo

Fanzone (Friday edition) - Fridays 15:30 LIVE

- Will Perry
- Clinton Morrison

Fanzone (Monday edition) - Mondays 14:30 LIVE (New time for 2024-2025 season)

- Anita Nneka Jones
- Leroy Rosenior

Generation xG - Mondays 17:00 LIVE

- Matt Holland (every other week)
- Leon Osman (every other week)
- Leroy Rosenior (co-presenter)

Match Officials Mic'd Up - First, second or third Tuesday of each month at 17:00 or 19:00 LIVE

- Michael Owen
- Howard Webb (former official)

Team Talks - Fridays 18:00 LIVE on non-match days, 22:30 LIVE on match days

- Julia Stuart (primary)
- Seema Jaswal
- Steve Bower
- Will Perry

The Big Interview - Thursdays 13:30 (pre-recorded)

- Steve Bower (lead)
- Ian Irving
- Will Perry (when interviews are conducted in French with English subtitles)
- Paul Belverstone
- Rebecca Louise Coles
- Anita Nneka Jones
- Karen Carney
- Matt Holland
- Tim Howard
- Alex Aljoe (when interviews are conducted in Italian, Portuguese or Spanish with English subtitles)
- Julien Laurens (when interviews are conducted in French with English subtitles)
- Natalie Gedra (when interviews are conducted in Portuguese with English subtitles)
- Renato Senise (when interviews are conducted in Portuguese or Spanish with English subtitles)
- Park Ji-Sung (when interviews are conducted in Korean with English subtitles)

The Final Word - Mondays 22:30 LIVE (on match days with kickoff time of 20:00 ONLY)

- Steve Bower
- Michael Owen (lead studio pundit)

Extra Time - Mondays 23:00 LIVE (on match days with kickoff time of 20:00 ONLY)

- Steve Bower
- Michael Owen (lead studio pundit)

The Saturday Wrap (formerly Matchday Live Extra) - Saturdays 20:00 LIVE (or 30 minutes after final Premier League match of the day)

- Seema Jaswal (primary)
- Julia Stuart
- Steve Bower
- Kelly Somers

The Weekend Wrap - Sundays 19:00 LIVE (or 30 minutes after the conclusion of the final match if it were to kick off at a time other than 16:30; new time for 2025-26 season)

- Steve Bower (lead)

Welcome to the Weekend - Fridays 12:00 LIVE (on match weekends ONLY)

- Johnathan Joseph
- Olivia Buzaglo
- Andrew Mensah
- Ayo Akinwolere (reporter and backup presenter)
- Kyle Walker (reporter)
- Alex Aljoe (reporter)
- Anita Nneka Jones (reporter)
- Rebecca Louise Coles (reporter)
- Ellie Collins (reporter)
- Emil Franchi (reporter)

Main Commentators (play-by-play):

- (Republic of Ireland) Conor McNamara (lead)
- (England) Jim Proudfoot (co-lead)
- (England) Jon Champion (Saturdays at 12:30 or 17:30)
- (England) Joe Speight (Goal Rush broadcasts on Saturdays at 15:00)
- (England) Phil Blacker (Goal Rush back-up)
- (England) Seb Hutchinson (Data Zone broadcasts with enhanced analytical data for big matches including Sundays at 16:30)
- (England) Ian Darke
- (England) Martin Tyler (mainly Mondays at 20:00)
- (England) Gary Taphouse
- (England) Nigel Adderley
- (England) Mark Scott
- (England) Jonathan Beck
- (England) Chris Wise
- (England) Steve Wilson
- (England) Daniel Mann
- (England) Richard Kaufman
- (England) Kevin Keatings
- (England) David Stowell
- (England) Andy Bishop
- (England) Guy Havord
- (England) Rob Palmer
- (England) Bill Leslie
- (England) Alan Parry
- (England) Gary Weaver
- (England) Rob Hawthorne
- (England) Ian Crocker
- (England) Steve Banyard
- (England) Stewart Gardner
- (Northern Ireland) Paul Gilmour
- (England) Jacqui Oatley
- (Netherlands) Pien Meulensteen
- (England) Clive Tyldesley
- (England) Jon Driscoll
- (England) Tom Gayle
- (England) John Roder
- (England) Robyn Cowen
- (England) Guy Mowbray
- (England) Paul Dempsey
- (England) Vicki Sparks
- (England) Martin Fisher
- (England) Steven Wyeth
- (England) Sam Matterface
- (England) Rory Hamilton
- (England) Paul Walker
- (England) Ben Andrews
- (England) Dan Roebuck
- (England) James Fielden
- (England) Jonathan Pearce
- (England) Simon Brotherton
- (England) Alistair Mann
- (England) Dan Mason
- (England) Wayne Boyce
- (England) Simon Watts
- (England) Dave Farrar
- (Scotland) Rob MacLean
- (England) Adam Summerton
- (England) Adrian Healey
- (Scotland) Derek Rae
- (England) Rob Daly
- (England) Peter Drury (On loan from NBC Sports and Sky Sports for occasional matches through May 2028)
- (England) Dominic Johnson
- (England) Pete Odgers
- (England) Rob Jones
- (England) Ellen Ellard
- (England) Chris Latchem

Co-commentators (match analysts):

- (Republic of Ireland) Andy Townsend (lead)
- (Republic of Ireland) Jim Beglin (co-lead)
- (England) (Sierra Leone) Leroy Rosenior (Data Zone broadcasts with enhanced analytical data for big matches including Sundays 1630)
- (England) Leon Osman (Data Zone back-up)
- (England) (Republic of Ireland) Matt Holland (Data Zone back-up)
- (England) (Scotland) Don Hutchison (Goal Rush broadcasts on Saturdays 1500)
- (England) Dean Ashton (Goal Rush back-up)
- (England) Owen Hargreaves (Goal Rush back-up)
- (England) David Prutton
- (England) Clive Allen
- (England) (Nigeria) Efan Ekoku
- (England) Chris Sutton
- (England) Matthew Upson
- (England) Steve Sidwell
- (England) Robert Green
- (England) Tony Gale
- (England) Alan Smith
- (England) Gary Neville
- (England) Stephen Warnock
- (England) Terry Gibson
- (England) Lee Hendrie
- (England) Iain Dowie
- (England) Chris Waddle
- (Republic of Ireland) Keith Andrews
- (England) (Gibraltar) Danny Higginbotham
- (England) Garry Birtles
- (England) Don Goodman
- (England) Andy Hinchcliffe
- (Republic of Ireland) Kevin Kilbane
- (Scotland) Andy Walker
- (Wales) David Phillips
- (Wales) Danny Gabbidon
- (Wales) Dave Edwards
- (Scotland) Davie Provan
- (England) Karen Carney
- (England) Courtney Sweetman-Kirk
- (England) Michael Bridges
- (England) Paul Robinson
- (Scotland) Alan Hutton
- (England) Glenn Murray
- (England) Casey Stoney
- (England) Lucy Ward
- (England) Sue Smith
- (Australia) Mark Schwarzer
- (England) Michael Brown
- (Scotland) Ally McCoist
- (England) Gary Breen
- (England) Michael Gray
- (England) Matt Jackson
- (England) Neil Warnock
- (England) Sam Parkin
- (England) Adam Virgo
- (England) Tony Dorigo
- (Republic of Ireland) Ray Houghton
- (England) Stewart Robson
- (England) Laura Bassett
- (England) Nigel Spackman
- (England) Dean Sturridge
- (England) Nigel Winterburn
- (England) Trevor Francis
- (England) Alan Curbishley
- (England) Barry Horne
- (England) Mark Bright
- (Scotland) James McFadden
- (England) (Jamaica) Jobi McAnuff
- (England) Izzy Christiansen
- (Wales) Robert Earnshaw
- (Wales) James Collins
- (England) Andros Townsend
- (Wales) Rob Edwards
- (England) Scott Minto
- (England) Phil Jagielka
- (England) Darren Ambrose
- (England) Marc Albrighton
- (England) Joel Ward
- (England) Paul Robinson
- (Bulgaria) Stiliyan Petrov

== Spanish-language broadcast team ==
For the 2022–23 and 2023-24 seasons, Premier League Productions, in conjunction with production partner Telemundo Deportes, employed Latin American Spanish-language señal internacional ("world feed") match commentators working "off tube" (off monitor) from Telemundo Center in Miami, Florida, USA or from Telemundo's Mexico City, Mexico bureau. Their voices were heard each week via streaming video services Paramount+ and Pluto TV in Mexico and Central America, and occasionally via streaming video service Star+ in 9 Spanish-speaking countries in South America. YouTube users in the USA were also able to listen to their voices in highlights clips at the "Telemundo Deportes" account.

For the 2024-25 season, Premier League Productions has ordered Latin American Spanish-language world feed commentary for up to 4 matches each match week and will continue to rely on production partner Telemundo Deportes to produce Spanish-language world feed commentary from Telemundo Center in Miami or from Telemundo's Mexico City bureau. Premier League Productions is offering Spanish-language world feed commentary to rightsholders OUTSIDE the Americas and Spain (such as Optus Sport in Australia) where significant immigrant populations from Spanish-speaking Latin America exist. TNT Sports Mexico will also use Spanish-language world feed commentary if it were to broadcast 5 or more matches on a single calendar day. Note that other rightsholders in Spanish-speaking Latin America (including ESPN South America and Fox Sports Mexico) are NOT using Spanish-language world feed commentary during the 2024-25 season.

Narradores/Relatores (main commentators/"play-by-play"):

- (Venezuela) Jesús Eduardo Acosta (Miami, Florida, USA)
- (Argentina) Copán Álvarez (Miami, Florida, USA)
- (Japan) Kaziro Aoyama (Mexico City, Mexico)
- (Colombia) Juan Guillermo Arango (Miami, Florida, USA)
- (Colombia) José Bauz (Miami, Florida, USA)
- (Venezuela) Luis Gerardo Bucci (Miami, Florida, USA)
- (Mexico) Jorge D. Calvo (Miami, Florida, USA)
- (Venezuela) Daniel Chapela (Miami, Florida, USA)
- Óscar Guzmán (Mexico City, Mexico)
- Iván López Elizondo (Mexico City, Mexico)
- (Colombia) Juan Fernando Mora (Miami, Florida, USA)
- (El Salvador) José Hernández (Miami, Florida, USA)
- Alfredo "Lobo" Morales (Mexico City, Mexico)
- (Argentina) Diego Pessolano (Miami, Florida, USA)
- (Colombia) Omar Orlando Salazar (Miami, Florida, USA)
- (Colombia) Óscar F. Salazar (Miami, Florida, USA)
- (Chile) Luis Omar Tapia (Miami, Florida, USA; 2023-2024 season ONLY)

Analistas (match analysts/co-commentators):

- (Japan) Kaziro Aoyama (Mexico City, Mexico)
- (Colombia) Juan Guillermo Arango (Miami, Florida, USA)
- (Colombia) José Bauz (Miami, Florida, USA)
- Alberto Bernard (Mexico City, Mexico)
- (Venezuela) Francisco Blavia (Miami, Florida, USA)
- (Venezuela) Luis Gerardo Bucci (Miami, Florida, USA)
- (Venezuela) Daniel Chapela (Miami, Florida, USA)
- (Venezuela) Bruno Gómez (Miami, Florida, USA)
- (Mexico) Carlos Hermosillo (Miami, Florida, USA; 2022-23 season ONLY)
- Iván López Elizondo (Mexico City, Mexico)
- (Ecuador) Jaime Macías Alarcón (Miami, Florida, USA)
- (Colombia) Juan Fernando Mora (Miami, Florida, USA)
- (Venezuela) Walter Reinaldo Roque (Miami, Florida, USA)
- (Colombia) Omar Orlando Salazar (Miami, Florida, USA)
- (Argentina) José Luis Villarreal (Miami, Florida, USA)
