= Survival Sunday =

Final day of the Premier League season in English football

Survival Sunday is the colloquial name for the 38th and final matchday of the Premier League season in English football; since the 1995–96 season, it has consisted of 10 fixtures with simultaneous kickoff times.

== Background ==
Since the 1995–96 FA Premier League season, all 10 fixtures on the final Sunday of the season have been scheduled with simultaneous kickoff times to ensure integrity, as this prevents the implications surrounding the final outcomes of the season (such as the league championship, UEFA Champions League qualification, and relegation) from being known or influenced by the result of matches played earlier in the day.

The phrase "Survival Sunday" has often been used by the press and broadcasters to refer to the final matchday. In 2012, the phrase was popularized in the United States through its use by local Premier League television rightsholder Fox Sports, when the division announced plans to use its various cable television networks and digital platforms (including several that are not normally devoted to mainstream sports, let alone sports at all, such as FX, Fuel TV and Speed) to televise nine of the matches under the Survival Sunday branding. The Manchester City v. Queens Park Rangers match was not aired by a Fox property, and was instead selected to air on co-rightsholder ESPN2. That match affected both the title race involving City and their city rivals Manchester United, and also the relegation battle involving QPR and Bolton (Manchester City won the title in stoppage time in that match; QPR survived after Bolton drew against Stoke City).

Current U.S. rightsholder NBC Sports has continued the practice under the branding Championship Sunday, typically using NBC, USA Network, CNBC, and the Peacock streaming service among others to carry all 10 matches. Like Fox, it has often used NBCUniversal networks not typically devoted to mainstream sports, such as Bravo, E!, MSNBC, Oxygen, Syfy, and in one case, Golf Channel.

== Notable instances ==
=== 2004–05 season ===
For the first time since the advent of the Premier League in 1992, no team was mathematically relegated before the final day of the season. In each of the last three weekends of the season, the team that was bottom of the table at the start of the weekend finished it outside the drop zone. The final round of the season started on 15 May with West Bromwich Albion at the bottom, Southampton and Crystal Palace one point ahead and Norwich City a further point ahead, in the last safe spot.

On the final day of the 2004–05 FA Premier League, none of the three sides to be relegated had been decided. Norwich City, Southampton, Crystal Palace, and West Bromwich Albion were all separated by just two points going into the final match. It was the first time since the establishment of the Premier League in 1992 that no team was assured of relegation going into the final matchday and the closest dogfight in the top flight since 1927–28, when 4 teams were separated by only two points going into the final matchday, in an era when a win was worth two points instead of today's three. Even worse, only one team survived the drop. West Brom (who started the day bottom) needed to beat Portsmouth at The Hawthorns, and they won 2–0 thanks to goals from Geoff Horsfield and Kieran Richardson meaning Baggies fans were having to nervously wait for other results. Norwich, who started in pole position, needed a first away victory of the season at Craven Cottage against Fulham with little to play for would secure their top-flight status and relegate the other three sides irrespective of their results. Instead, they were thumped 6–0 at Fulham and were relegated after a dreadful display. Southampton meanwhile hosted Manchester United and looked like staying up after a John O'Shea own goal, but the Irishman set up Darren Fletcher to equalize before Ruud van Nistelrooy headed home to send them down. In the other game, Crystal Palace traveled to local rivals Charlton Athletic and after Bryan Hughes gave them a half time lead, Dougie Freedman equalized within two minutes of coming on as a substitute before winning a penalty which top scorer Andy Johnson scored, heading them closer to staying up, but Jerome Thomas's free kick was headed home by Jonathan Fortune, the game finished 2–2, relegating them. That meant West Brom became the first team to be bottom at Christmas and stay up, this resulted in the Baggies fans invading The Hawthorns pitch, Portsmouth fans joined in as their local rivals Southampton were relegated, Albion also stayed up with the lowest ever points tally in the Premier League for a surviving team with 34.

=== 2007–08 season ===
On the final day of the 2007–08 Premier League season, Derby County had long-since been relegated in bottom place after experiencing the worst season in Premier League history (the Rams only won a single game all season, going an astonishing 1-8-29), but the other two relegation spots were still yet to be filled, and four teams could go down: Birmingham City, Bolton Wanderers, Fulham, and Reading. Fulham were level on points with Reading but had slightly a better goal difference. Matches kicked off at 16:00 BST. In the end, Birmingham City went down by a point to Fulham despite having a better goal difference to Fulham and despite winning 4–1 against Blackburn Rovers. Reading beat Derby County 4–0 at Pride Park but still went down on goal difference by 3 goals to Fulham who beat Portsmouth 1–0 at Fratton Park to stay up before Bolton Wanderers equalized in the 92nd minute against Chelsea to confirm their Premier League status.

=== 2008–09 season ===
On the final day of the 2008–09 Premier League season, two teams from four would go down (West Brom were already relegated): Hull City, Middlesbrough, Newcastle United, and Sunderland. The matches were played at 16:00 BST. The four teams were separated by four points before kick-off. Two hours later, Middlesbrough & Newcastle United were relegated despite having a better goal difference than Hull City. All four teams lost on the final day: Hull 1–0 to Manchester United, Middlesbrough 2–1 to West Ham, Newcastle 1–0 to Aston Villa and Sunderland 3–2 to Chelsea.

=== 2010–11 season ===
On the last day of the 2010–11 season, five teams — Wolves, Blackburn Rovers, Birmingham City, Blackpool and Wigan — battled to avoid the two open relegation spots (West Ham were already relegated). All five teams were separated by one point, marking the first time since 1995–96 that five teams had entered the season's final day in danger of relegation, and the first time ever that five teams facing the drop were separated by one point going into the final matchday.

After 37 matches, Blackburn and Wolves were each on 40 points, with Blackburn having the edge on goal difference (–14 to –19). The other three sides were on 39, separated only by goal difference (Birmingham City –20, Blackpool –21, Wigan –22).

Wolves hosted Blackburn at Molineux. Both sides entered the match knowing that if they won, they were assured of staying up. The other teams facing relegation played away to teams whose motivation for a peak performance was arguably limited. Birmingham were at fifth-placed Tottenham. While Spurs could secure a Europa League place with a win, manager Harry Redknapp suggested prior to the match that he would rather avoid the fixture congestion that comes with that competition. On the other hand, Spurs entered the final matchday top of the Premier League Fair Play table, which would have given them a Europa League berth regardless of their result. However, if they had entered by that method, they had to start their European campaign in the first qualifying round on 30 June, giving them an incentive to win. Blackpool were at champions Manchester United, who faced Barcelona in the Champions League final next Saturday. In the remaining match, Wigan played at mid-table Stoke City. All games except Wolves v Blackburn were shown live on Sky Sports.

The day proved almost as dramatic as the 2004–05 dogfight.

==== First half ====
At Molineux, Blackburn took a 3–0 lead into the halftime break. At the same time, two of the other key matches—Stoke–Wigan and Spurs–Birmingham—were both scoreless, and Blackpool were level 1–1 at Old Trafford.

At that moment, Wolves and Wigan were in the drop zone.

==== Second half ====
The second half of all matches saw many twists and turns, with changes in the virtual table occurring several times. First, in the 49th minute at White Hart Lane, Roman Pavlyuchenko scored to give Spurs a 1–0 lead, sending Birmingham into the drop zone. Then, in the 57th minute at Old Trafford, Gary Taylor-Fletcher gave Blackpool a stunning 2–1 lead against a United team that had dropped only two points at home all season. But five minutes later, Anderson equalised.

In the 73rd minute at Molineux, Jamie O'Hara pulled back one goal for Wolves, although at that moment they were still in the drop zone. Then, in the 74th minute, Blackpool suffered a shattering turn of fortune when Ian Evatt deflected a United cross into his own goal, putting Blackpool into the drop zone and taking Wolves out of it.

The next turn of fortune came in the 78th minute at the Britannia Stadium, where Hugo Rodallega scored for Wigan to give them a cushion of safety, and ultimately a 1–0 win. One minute later at White Hart Lane, Craig Gardner equalised for Birmingham, which took Birmingham out of the drop zone at Wolves' expense. In the meantime, Michael Owen sealed the Seasiders' fate with a goal for United in the 81st minute, giving them a 4–2 lead. Although the Old Trafford crowd sincerely applauded Blackpool post-match, it was scant consolation for their supporters.

Wolves would exit the drop zone in the 87th minute, when Stephen Hunt pulled back a second goal against Blackburn, narrowing the deficit to 2–3 (which proved to be the final score). At that moment, they would have stayed up on goals scored over Birmingham. Finally, in stoppage time, Pavlyuchenko scored his second goal to give Spurs a 2–1 victory and seal Birmingham's fate. When word came of Pavlyuchenko's second goal, both sets of fans at Molineux celebrated, first by singing songs in the stands and then storming the pitch at the final whistle.

In the end, Birmingham and Blackpool were relegated along with West Ham in the Championship next season.

=== 2014–15 season ===
On the final day of the 2014–15 season, two teams: Newcastle United and Hull City, both battled to avoid the final relegation spot available (Burnley and Queens Park Rangers were already relegated two weeks prior). Hull hosted Manchester United at the KC Stadium, and Newcastle hosted West Ham United at St James' Park. On goal difference, Hull City had the edge over Newcastle by seven goals (–18 to –25). Therefore, Hull needed to win and hope that Newcastle failed to win against West Ham to stand any chance of survival. However, it went against them, as Newcastle won 2–0, meaning that Hull were relegated along with Burnley and QPR in the Championship the following season. The Hull-Manchester United match ended 0–0.

=== 2019–20 season ===
On the final day of the 2019–20 season, fans knew only one out of Watford, Aston Villa, and Bournemouth would survive (Norwich City were already relegated). Villa and Watford were tied on 34 points, with Villa above Watford by one goal, while Bournemouth were three points and one goal behind Villa. All three teams played away from home on the last day: Villa at West Ham United, Watford at Arsenal and Bournemouth at Everton. Bournemouth had to win and hoped that both Villa and Watford lose to stand any chance of survival, while whoever had the better result among Villa and Watford would be guaranteed safety. In the end, Watford were relegated after a 3–2 loss despite a valiant comeback effort, while Bournemouth went down despite winning 3–1 due to Aston Villa's 1–1 draw at West Ham. Jack Grealish scored what proved to be the goal that sealed Villa's survival in the 84th minute, and then they held on for the last five nerve-shredding minutes after Michail Antonio equalized for the Hammers.

=== 2021–22 season ===
On the final day of the 2021–22 season, Burnley and Leeds United, who were tied on 35 points, battled to avoid the final relegation spot available (Norwich City and Watford were already relegated). Burnley hosted Newcastle United while Leeds travelled to Brentford. Burnley had the edge over Leeds on goal difference by 20 goals. Therefore, they needed to match Leeds' result to ensure safety while Leeds needed to better that of Burnley.

The day started when Raphinha opened the scoring with a second-half penalty, before Sergi Canós equalized with ten minutes to go, only for him to then get two yellow cards in as many minutes (the first for over-celebration of his goal, the second for a foul on Raphinha) which, along with their having no substitutes left after Kristoffer Ajer went off injured, reduced the Bees to nine men. Finally, Jack Harrison's last minute goal against Brentford sealed 2–1 victory to Jesse Marsch's side. On the other hand, Newcastle, who spent most of the first half in a relegation dogfight, took the lead against Burnley after only 18 minutes when Nathan Collins committed a handball while defending from a corner kick; Callum Wilson scored from the resulting penalty, before getting another goal early in the second half. A consolation goal from Maxwel Cornet was not enough, so the Clarets went down to the Championship after six consecutive seasons in the Premier League. Consequently, Leeds United became the first side since Wigan Athletic in 2011 to survive after starting the final day in the bottom three.

=== 2022–23 season ===
On the final day of the 2022–23 season, only one out of Everton, Leeds United, and Leicester City would survive (Southampton were already relegated). Leeds and Leicester were tied on 31 points, with Leicester above Leeds on goal difference by nine goals, while Everton were two points ahead in the last safe spot, with a goal difference superior to that of Leeds by three goals but inferior to that of Leicester by six. All three teams played at home on the last day: Leicester hosted West Ham United, Leeds hosted Tottenham Hotspur, who were also battling to qualify for the UEFA Europa Conference League with Aston Villa and Brentford, and Everton hosted Bournemouth. Everton needed to match both Leeds and Leicester's results in order to survive, though even a loss would be enough to survive if Leeds and Leicester both failed to win. Meanwhile, Leicester needed to win and hope Everton did not, while Leeds had to win and hope Everton lost and Leicester did not win, though a win by three goals coupled with an Everton draw and Leicester failing to win would also be enough.

In the end, Everton defeated Bournemouth 1–0, securing their safety and relegating everyone else regardless of results. The Leicester-West Ham match ended 2–1 while the Leeds-Tottenham game ended 1–4.

=== 2025–26 season ===
On the last day of the 2025–26 season, Tottenham Hotspur and West Ham United battled to avoid the final relegation spot available (Burnley and Wolverhampton Wanderers were already relegated). Tottenham sat in the last safe spot with 38 points, while West Ham had 36, with Tottenham having the edge on goal difference by 12 goals. This meant Tottenham had to avoid defeat to survive, while West Ham had to win and hoped that Tottenham lost. Tottenham hosted Everton, while West Ham hosted Leeds United.

In the end, Tottenham defeated Everton 1-0 to secure their safety, which meant that West Ham were relegated. The West Ham - Leeds United match ended 3-0.

== Similar practices in other leagues ==
Since 2015, Major League Baseball has adopted a similar scheduling practice, in which all teams play the 162nd and final game of the regular season (where any undecided divisional placements and wild card berths in the postseason are typically clinched) on the last Sunday in September or first Sunday in October, with all games beginning at 3:00 p.m. ET/12:00 p.m. PT. MLB's then-chief operating officer Tony Petitti stated that the practice increased excitement by preventing "lame duck" situations determined by the result of games played earlier in the day (including teams pulling star players from the game for additional rest if it became apparent that their team had advanced).

The same year, North American football league Major League Soccer similarly began branding its final matchday of the regular season as "Decision Day", which consists entirely of intra-conference fixtures. Presently, the Eastern and Western conferences play all matches simultaneously in two evening windows, with 6 p.m. and 9 p.m. ET (6 p.m. PT) kickoffs respectively.
