= Ayo Akinwolere =

British television presenter and broadcaster

- Born: Odunayo Andrew Akinwolere; 30 November 1982 (age 43); Ibadan, Nigeria
- Education: Sheffield Hallam University (BA Media Studies, 2004; Honorary Doctorate, 2022)
- Occupations: Television presenter; journalist; podcaster; producer
- Years active: 2004–present
- Employer(s): BBC, Channel 4, CBS Sports, The Athletic / The New York Times, Premier League Productions
- Known for: Blue Peter (2006–2011); The Athletic FC Podcast (The Athletic); 2022 Commonwealth Games host (BBC); 2022 Winter Olympics host (BBC); 2025 Africa Cup of Nations host (Channel 4); Premier League Today host (Premier League Productions); World record open-water swim (2011)
- Awards: BAFTA nominee (×4); Royal Television Society Award; BBC Ruby Award; Sports Podcast of the Year (2024); Football Content Awards – Best Podcast (2025); Honorary Doctorate, Sheffield Hallam University (2022)

Odunayo Andrew Akinwolere (born 30 November 1982), known professionally as Ayo Akinwolere and formerly as Andy Akinwolere, is a British television presenter, journalist, and broadcaster. He is best known for his five-year tenure as a co-presenter on the BBC children's programme Blue Peter (2006–2011), during which he became the show's first Black male presenter. Since leaving Blue Peter, Akinwolere has become a prominent figure in sports broadcasting, working across the BBC, Channel 4, CBS Sports, Amazon Prime, and Premier League Productions.

In June 2011, Akinwolere set a world record for the deepest location open-water swim, crossing more than five miles of the Palau Trench in the Pacific Ocean. He is a four-time BAFTA nominee, a Royal Television Society (RTS) Award winner, and a BBC Ruby Award recipient. In 2023, he became host of The Athletic FC Podcast, which won Sports Podcast of the Year at the British Podcast Awards in 2024.

== Early life and education ==
Akinwolere was born in Ibadan, Nigeria, on 30 November 1982. He moved to the United Kingdom with his family at the age of eight, settling in Birmingham. Upon arriving in the UK, he began using the English name "Andy" — his Christian name — which remained his professional name throughout his early career. His parents are both doctors and practised in Kidderminster, Worcestershire.

He attended St Mary's Roman Catholic Primary School in Harborne and subsequently St Thomas Aquinas Catholic School in Kings Norton, Birmingham. He went on to study at Sheffield Hallam University, graduating in 2004 with a Bachelor of Arts degree in Media Studies. Originally intending to pursue a career in documentary-making and radio, he moved to London on a six-week work placement as a runner with the BBC.

In later years, Akinwolere reverted publicly to his Nigerian name "Ayo" (a shortened form of Odunayo), describing the decision as an act of personal authenticity reflecting his British-Nigerian identity.

In November 2022, Sheffield Hallam University awarded Akinwolere an honorary doctorate in recognition of his services to broadcasting and racial justice. On receiving the award, he said: "It is an absolute honour to be recognised for this doctorate, especially from a university and a city I called home for three years of my life."

== Blue Peter (2006–2011) ==
Akinwolere joined Blue Peter as a co-presenter on 28 June 2006, having been approached to audition by a producer he met at the BBC. He served as a presenter for five years, becoming the programme's first Black male presenter — a milestone he later discussed publicly in the context of representation in British television.

During his time on the show, Akinwolere participated in a number of high-profile challenges, including a bungee jump from a helicopter at 11,000 feet. In 2008, as lead presenter, he hosted Queen Elizabeth II on the programme to mark 50 years of Blue Peter. He appeared on other BBC programmes during this period, including Ready Steady Cook (December 2007), competing against fellow presenter Konnie Huq, and The Weakest Link. He was nominated for the BAFTA Children's Award for Presenter of the Year in both 2008 and 2010, and the show itself was nominated for Best Factual Programme.

He departed Blue Peter at the end of the 2010–11 season, following the completion of his world record open-water swim (see below).

== Sports broadcasting ==
Following his departure from Blue Peter, Akinwolere developed a career in sports broadcasting, working across several major UK and international broadcasters. At the BBC, he presented Football Focus and The Premier League Show, as well as coverage of the South African 2010 FIFA World Cup for CBBC. He also presented the London Mini-Marathon and contributed BBC Sport blog content.

He presented live rugby union coverage for Channel 4, co-hosting the weekly magazine programme The Big Tackle. For three years, he hosted UEFA Europa League coverage on CBS Sports' Golazo in the United States. In 2022, he was part of the BBC's broadcasting team for the 2022 Winter Olympics, and in 2023 he hosted a daily programme as part of the BBC's coverage of the 2022 Commonwealth Games, which received a Royal Television Society Award for Best Sports Programme.

He currently hosts Premier League Today for Premier League Productions and continues to cover major sporting events for Channel 4, Amazon Prime, and the BBC. In 2025, he hosted Channel 4's coverage of the 2025 Africa Cup of Nations. He has conducted interviews with prominent athletes including Pelé, Usain Bolt, Lewis Hamilton, and Jessica Ennis-Hill.

In 2023, Akinwolere joined The Athletic, a sports media outlet owned by The New York Times, as host of The Athletic FC Podcast. The podcast covers major stories and narratives in global football and has become one of the most prominent football podcasts in the UK, winning Sports Podcast of the Year at the British Podcast Awards in 2024 and Best Podcast at the Football Content Awards in 2025.

== Documentaries and journalism ==
Akinwolere moved into investigative and factual television with the BBC's regional current affairs programme Inside Out, which he presented in the West Midlands between 2014 and 2020. His debut documentary for the programme, a film on extremism, earned him a Royal Television Society Award. He subsequently received the BBC Ruby Award for Programme of the Year.

He also presented a number of standalone documentaries for the BBC, including Teens from a Small Island (2010), Stammer School (2011), and the radio documentary It's a Dog's Life. His documentary World Olympic Dreams, which took him to Jamaica to explore the country's sprinting culture, included an interview with Usain Bolt. In 2021, through his production company, he produced Yorkshire Cop: Police Racism and Me. He was also a regular contributor to BBC Radio 4's Our Home Correspondent.

Akinwolere has written for BBC Sport, The Daily Telegraph, and The Huffington Post.

== Podcasting ==
In 2023, Akinwolere became the host of The Athletic FC Podcast, a flagship podcast produced by The Athletic, a sports media outlet owned by The New York Times. The podcast covers major stories and narratives in global football. In 2024, it was awarded Sports Podcast of the Year at the British Podcast Awards, and in 2025 it won Best Podcast at the Football Content Awards.

== MilkFirst Productions ==
In late 2020, Akinwolere co-founded MilkFirst Productions, an independent production company focused on developing original documentary and factual media content. The company's debut production was Yorkshire Cop: Police Racism and Me (2021), a documentary examining institutional racism in British policing.

== World record swim ==
In June 2011, during his final season on Blue Peter, Akinwolere swam more than five miles across the Palau Trench in the Pacific Ocean, setting a world record for the deepest location open-water swim. The feat was particularly notable because Akinwolere had a deep-rooted phobia of open water and only learned to swim ten weeks before the challenge. He is one of four people of colour to hold a swimming world record.

Following this achievement, in 2015 Akinwolere launched The Swim Challenge, a project designed to encourage swimming among people of colour. He recruited fifteen non-swimming adults from diverse ethnic backgrounds in London and developed a bespoke swimming programme, in collaboration with the Swim Dem Crew, to help participants overcome their fears and learn to swim within ten weeks.

== Other work ==
Akinwolere has appeared in a number of entertainment programmes, including Celebrity MasterChef (BBC One), The Great Comic Relief Bake Off (BBC Two), and The Great British Banquet (BBC Two). He was a contestant on Total Wipeout's Celebrity Special in April 2011, withdrawing due to injury.

From 2012 to 2014, Akinwolere co-presented Fort Boyard: Ultimate Challenge on CITV and ITV, alongside Laura Hamilton. He joined the show from its third series, replacing the previous co-host, and presented series three, four and five until the show concluded in December 2014. The show received a BAFTA Children's Award nomination for Best Entertainment Programme in 2014.

In 2016, Akinwolere appeared as a contributor and reporter on World of Weird (Channel 4), a factual entertainment series exploring unusual subcultures and eccentric characters from around the world. He featured in Episode 1 (28 September 2016), which covered topics including vampires in Texas and zentais in Tokyo; Episode 5 (26 October 2016), which explored a wizard school in Poland and the micronation Republic of Molossia; and Episode 6 (2 November 2016), which featured a Japanese apology agency, furries, and the Battle of the Nations.

He is an avid photographer; his work has been published in the children's edition of National Geographic and in Vogue Bambini. He won the British Photography Award for Fine Art for a piece entitled Great Britain, described as a response to the changing landscape of global ethnicity. He has also guest lectured on media and broadcasting at universities across the United Kingdom.

== Advocacy and public speaking ==
Akinwolere is a prominent speaker on diversity, representation, and inclusion in media and sport. He serves as an ambassador for the Street Child World Cup and for Body and Soul, a UK charity supporting children and families affected by HIV. He supports Crisis UK and The Prince's Trust.

As a member of BAFTA, he has presented the annual Young Film Critic Awards. He has spoken publicly about the challenges faced by ethnic minority broadcasters in the British television industry and about the significance of his decision to reclaim his Nigerian name. He has toured universities across the United Kingdom with a lecture entitled Finding Your Voice, aimed at aspiring broadcasters from underrepresented backgrounds.

== Awards and nominations ==
Year	Award	Category	Result
2008	BAFTA Children's Awards	Presenter of the Year	Nominated
2009	BAFTA Children's Awards	Best Factual Programme (Blue Peter)	Nominated
2010	BAFTA Children's Awards	Presenter of the Year	Nominated
2014	BAFTA Children's Awards	Best Entertainment Programme (Fort Boyard: Ultimate Challenge)	Nominated
2015	Royal Television Society Award	Programme of the Year (Inside Out)	Won
TBC	BBC Ruby Award	Programme of the Year	Won
2023	Royal Television Society Award	Best Sports Programme (BBC Commonwealth Games)	Won
2024	British Podcast Awards	Sports Podcast of the Year (The Athletic FC Podcast)	Won
2025	Football Content Awards	Best Podcast (The Athletic FC Podcast)	Won
2022	Sheffield Hallam University	Honorary Doctorate	Won
