= Steve Banyard =

British football commentator

- Born: 1963 (age 62–63); England
- Occupations: Football Commentator, Broadcaster
- Employer(s): IMG Media, Premier League Productions, Host Broadcast Services, Olympic Broadcast Services

Steve Banyard (born 1963) is best known as a football commentator and broadcaster. In particular, he's known for working on the worldwide television feed of the Premier League and Italy's Serie A, as well as major FIFA and UEFA tournaments.

== Career ==
=== Radio ===
Banyard began his broadcasting career in 1985 as a part-time sports reporter at GWR FM in Bristol before becoming sports editor at Invicta Radio in Kent in 1988.

He moved to Hallam FM in Sheffield in 1991, and in 1999, he was named the top Sports Broadcaster at the North East of England Press and Broadcast awards.

=== Television ===
Banyard moved into television in 1999, initially working as a freelance reporter for Sky Sports News before establishing himself as a lead commentator on the world television feed of the English Premier League. This is the broadcast produced by Premier League Productions at IMG Media in London, distributed to more than 600 million people in over 200 countries worldwide.

He was part of the commentary team at the first FIFA World Cup produced by Host Broadcast Services in 2002, going on to work at further international tournaments including the FIFA World Cup, FIFA U-20 World Cup, FIFA U-17 World Cup, FIFA Confederations Cup, FIFA Women's World Cup and the FIFA U-20 Women's World Cup.

He was a lead commentator at the Olympic Games at London 2012 and also presented FIFA Futbol Mundial and the magazine programme of the UEFA Champions League.

He has commentated several times on the world television feed of the UEFA European Championship, most recently at UEFA Euro 2020. He was heard on BBC One after the collapse of Denmark's Christian Eriksen, and also on ITV when they broadcast highlights of Denmark's match with Russia.

In the UK, Banyard has appeared occasionally on Sky Sports on UEFA European Qualifiers and the UEFA Nations League, but he's more widely known outside the UK in other English-speaking territories. Since 2018, he's been a lead commentator on the world television feed of Italy's Serie A alongside presentation work on the Premier League.

Other credits include commentating on France's Ligue 1 from 2004 to 2008 which aired in the UK on Channel 4 and then Five, as well as designing and developing a specialist website for commentators and broadcasters.

=== Music ===
Banyard is also a published songwriter.

In 2010, he wrote and produced a football anthem for the England national football team called "Let's Hear It England" under the artist name 'Commentators United'. It was published by The Prince's Trust. The song features lines from well-known commentators including Martin Tyler, Clive Tyldesley, Guy Mowbray, Ian Darke, Jon Champion, Rob Hawthorne, Steve Wilson, Peter Drury, Simon Brotherton and the late Peter Brackley. The singing was done by the Cotswold Male Voice Choir. Banyard himself was a member of the choir for 5 years.

In 2011, Banyard performed one of his songs in public for the first time. He accompanied soloist Martin Dear on the piano in a performance of "No One Else" at Cheltenham Town Hall with the Bach String Ensemble Japan. The concert was compered by well known actor Brian Blessed.

He had 3 further songs published in 2015. Then in 2018, he re-recorded and released "Let's Hear It England" under the artist name "The DC Klub". The commentary lines were swapped around, with lead vocals performed this time by teenagers from Dean Close School in Cheltenham with backing from the Cotswold Male Voice Choir. The video features rare archive footage of England's FIFA World Cup winning team of 1966 including Alf Ramsey, Bobby Moore and Bobby Charlton.

== Personal ==
He was a pupil at Plymouth College and now lives in the Cotswolds in Gloucestershire.
