= Pien Meulensteen =

Dutch sports journalist and football commentator

- Born: January 1997 (age 29); Netherlands
- Education: University of Salford
- Occupation: Broadcaster
- Years active: 2019–present
- Employer: Sky Sports
- Known for: Sports presenting and commentating
- Relatives: René Meulensteen (father); Melle Meulensteen (brother)

Pien Meulensteen (born January 1997) is a Dutch-born British-based sports broadcaster. Her presenting and commentary work has included the FIFA World Cup, the Premier League, the FIFA Women's World Cup, and the Women's Super League. She has worked for broadcasters such as the BBC in Britain, Ziggo Sport in the Netherlands, and CBS in the United States. In 2023, she became the first woman to commentate on a live Premier League match in Britain for Sky Sports.

== Early life ==
Meulensteen was born in the Netherlands and moved to the UK in 2001 having also spent time in Qatar. Fluent in both English and Dutch, she began her broadcasting career at BBC Manchester whilst studying Broadcast Journalism at the University of Salford. She graduated in 2019.

== Career ==
Meulensteen reported from the 2021 FA Cup Final for Dutch broadcaster Ziggo Sport. She became a regular presenter and commentator for MUTV. She has also worked for DAZN, Premier League TV and BBC Radio 5 Live.

She was the first journalist to interview Dutch coach Erik ten Hag in England when he took over as the new coach of Premier League side Manchester United and has provided football commentary for BBC One flagship highlights programme Match of the Day, as well as for American broadcaster CBS Sports. She commentated on matches for the BBC at the 2022 FIFA World Cup.

In 2023, she became the first female to commentate on a live Premier League match for Sky Sports. In July 2023, she joined the Sky Sports commentary team for the Women's Super League. She commented for ITV Sport at the 2023 FIFA Women's World Cup.

Meulensteen was a studio host for Fox Sports in the United States during their presentation of the 2026 FIFA World Cup.

=== Awards ===
She won the One to Watch – On Air category at the British Sports Journalism Awards in London, in February 2023.

== Personal life ==
She is the daughter of Marieke and René Meulensteen. She has two brothers, Joppe and Melle.
