= Steve Bower =

English football commentator

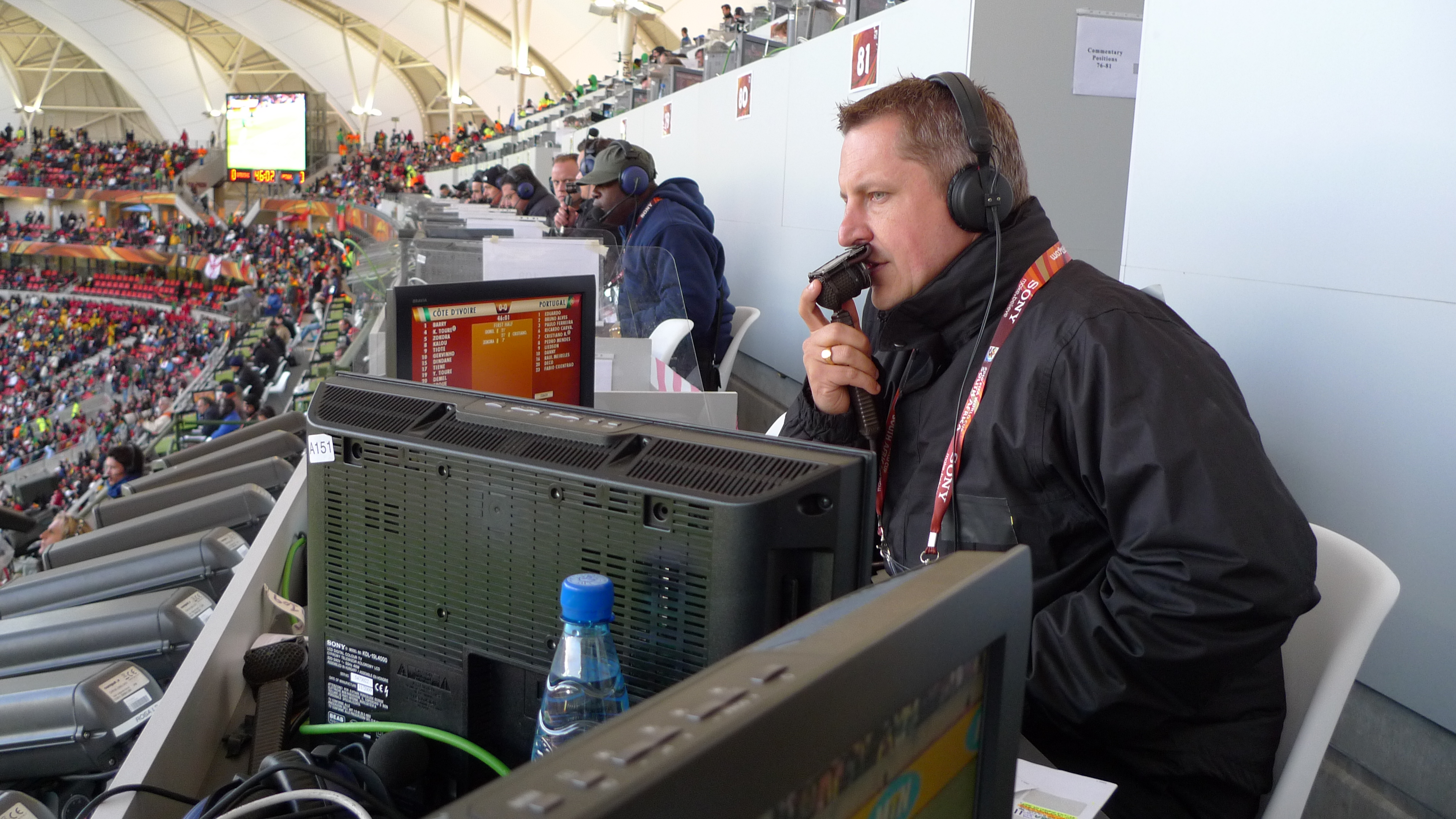
- Bower commentating at the 2010 FIFA World Cup
- Born: Stephen Robert Bower; 1973 (age 52–53); Clatterbridge Hospital, Cheshire
- Occupation: Football Commentator
- Employer(s): BBC Sport, TNT Sports, PL Productions, DAZN
- Children: Ryan Edward Bower

Stephen Robert Bower (born 1973) is an English football commentator. He is best known as one of the main voices for BBC TV's Match of the Day, culminating in being part of the commentary teams for the 2010, 2014, 2018, and 2022 FIFA World Cups. Bower commentated on New Zealand's historic draw with Italy and Argentina's 4–1 win over South Korea amongst others. He can also be heard on TNT Sports covering the Europa League, Serie A, and the Bundesliga, NBCSN covering the Premier League in the US, and ESPN covering international matches. He is the lead presenter on world feed Premier League Productions and presents Premier League football for Amazon Prime Video UK. Previous work includes Setanta Sports, ESPN UK, and MUTV.

== Early career ==
Educated at Calday Grange Grammar School, Bower began his career in 1991 at Radio City (Liverpool), where he presented sports bulletins on the weekday breakfast show. He then began providing commentary and presenting on the stations coverage of local football teams Everton F.C., Liverpool F.C. and Tranmere Rovers matches

In May 1996, Bower was appointed Head of Sport at Piccadilly Radio in Manchester, at the time the youngest sports editor in UK Independent Radio. He also presented various sports programme, and match commentary on Manchester United, Manchester City and Bolton Wanderers. In addition, he gave coverage of UEFA Euro 1996 for Independent Radio News, while in 1998, he gave full match commentary on all England and Scotland matches during the 1998 FIFA World Cup for the entire EMAP radio network.

== MUTV ==
From September 1998 to July 2007, Bower was senior commentator and presenter at Manchester United Television (MUTV) where he provided commentary on Premier League, Champions League, FA Cup and League Cup matches for the full 90-minute delayed broadcast with a co-commentator (including the historic treble winning season of '98-99). He also gave commentary and on-location presentation on pre-season tour matches live around the world in places such as Australia, United States, China, Japan and South Africa, not to mention Reserve and Youth Cup matches (live). He conducted after-match interviews at every game with players and manager, plus special exclusive sit-downs such as with David Beckham on signing in Madrid, Sir Alex Ferguson on announcing his retirement and Roy Keane on 'prawn sandwich' fans. The Roy Keane interview was recorded as part of the series, Roy Keane Plays The Pundit, but was never broadcast due to Keane's reported stinging attack on his fellow Manchester United players.

Bower's role also comprised studio presentation, which included fans' phone-ins and special shows such as with Joel Glazer on his family buying Manchester United. His work as Head of Presentation made him responsible for all presenters and the overall look of the channel. In the Autumn of 2000, he and long time co-commentator from his days at Piccadilly, 1968 European Cup winner, Paddy Crerand were given their own show by MUTV entitled Crerand and Bower...in Extra Time. During this time, Bower was the England reporter for Talksport radio during Euro 2000 which saw him conduct daily interviews with manager and players, and offer on-location studio presentation. He also provided studio presentation throughout Euro 2004 for Talksport radio in addition to full match commentaries on England qualifiers and Champions League matches. Bower's MUTV commentary work, alongside Paddy Crerand, can be heard in the 2004 film The Day After Tomorrow.

== Setanta Sports ==
In July 2007, Bower made the move to Setanta Sports where he was a commentator and presenter. His work included live Premier League games, live FA Cup matches, live UEFA Cup matches, live World Cup qualifiers, commentary and presentation of live Blue Square Premier (conference) games, including play-off games and a final at Wembley. He also worked on FA Cup matches including build-up to the final, as well as coverage of live England under-21 and under-19 matches, and coverage of the FA Youth Cup (including the Final).

== Freelance work ==
Following Setanta Sports' UK division entering administration in June 2009, Bower began working for ESPN in August 2009, mainly focusing on European football including Portuguese Liga and Eredivise, but also domestic competitions from time to time. His first commentary for the network was the pre-season friendly between S.L. Benfica and A.C. Milan

He has been heard commentating for Sky Sports and on Match of the Day for the BBC. He also lends his voice for ITV Sport's highlights of the UEFA Europa League on ITV4.

In the 2013-14 season he has commentated on live Conference Premier coverage for BT Sport. He continues as the No. 2 commentator for Europa League as well as working Bundesliga and Ligue 1 for BT Sport.

He has also worked for NBC Sports as a play-by-play commentator for Premier League matches as an alternate to Arlo White, and has also hosted studio coverage for the network during the absences of primary host Rebecca Lowe, as well as various on-location segments. He has also hosted the network's Match of the Day and Premier League Download programs.

In 2016, Bower was a lead presenter for ESPN's coverage of Euro 2016.

Now, Bower is the presenter on Sundays for Premier League Productions for worldwide viewers.

Since 2019, Bower presents the live goals show for Amazon Prime UK coverage of the Premier League. He also commentates on the Champions League final every year for DAZN worldwide.

== Commentating credits ==
- FIFA World Cup: 2010 (BBC), 2014 (BBC), 2018 (BBC)
- Premier League: 1998–2007 (MUTV), 2007–2009 (Setanta) (Presenter/Commentator), 2009–present (BBC), 2015–2019 (NBC) (Presenter/Commentator), 2019–present (PL Productions) (Lead Presenter), 2019–present (Amazon) (Commentator/Presenter)
- UEFA European Championships: 2012 (BBC), 2016 (ESPN) (Presenter), 2020 (BBC)
- UEFA Champions League: 2015–present (BT Sport), 2019–present (DAZN) (Lead Commentator)
- UEFA Europa League: 2009-2013 (ESPN UK), 2013–present (BT Sport)
- FA Cup: 2009–present (BBC), 2009–2013 (ESPN UK), 2013–present (BT Sport)
- Bundesliga: 2009–2013 (ESPN UK), 2013–present (BT Sport)
- Serie A: 2009–2013 (ESPN UK), 2013–2019 (BT Sport)
- UEFA Nations League and Euro 2024 Qualifiers: 2022–2024 (Channel 4; England matches only)
