= Gary Taphouse =

Gary Taphouse is a TV football commentator from Bournemouth, England. He mainly works for Sky Sports and Premier League Productions.

He graduated from Bournemouth University in 1997 with a degree in Multi-Media Journalism. He has worked for Sky Sports since 2005 and commentates on English Premier League matches for Sky Sports' Match Choice programme. He also covers live EFL and WSL matches. According to his social media posts, he was worked with more than 100 different co-commentators. In the past his voice has been heard on MLS games, League Cup ties, La Liga matches, World Cup qualifiers and Champions League matches for the channel.

Taphouse commentated for Talksport radio from 2014–2019. He was part of their commentary team for the FA Cup, the 2014 FIFA World Cup in Brazil, the 2016 UEFA European Championship in France and the 2018 FIFA World Cup in Russia.

He also commentates for PLP, who supply overseas broadcasters with TV coverage of the Premier League.

In addition he works for Gravity Media and Pitch International, who supply world feed commentaries on such competitions as the FA Cup, League Cup and UEFA Champions League, Europa League & Europa Conference League.

In the past he has worked for the likes of Capital Radio and the GMG Radio group. Before that he had some print and online experience and worked for football analysts Opta.
