= Jim Beglin =

Irish Footballer

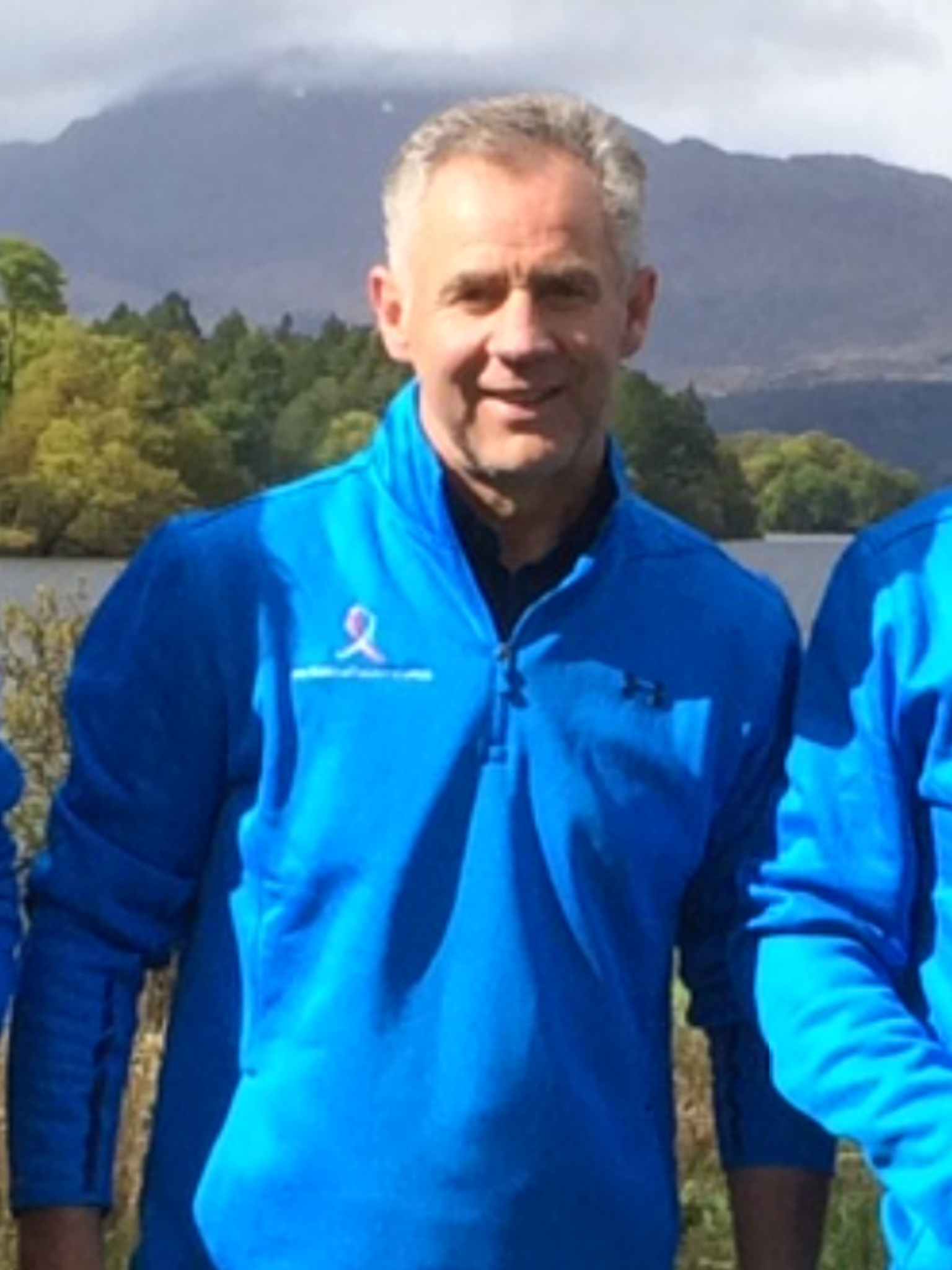
- Beglin in Loch Lomond, 2015

Personal information
- Full name: James Martin Beglin
- Date of birth: 29 July 1963 (age 63)
- Place of birth: County Waterford, Ireland
- Height: 1.80 m (5 ft 11 in)
- Position: Left back

Youth career
- –1980: Waterford Bolton
- Waterford Bohs.

Senior career*
Years	Team	Apps	(Gls)
1980–1983	Shamrock Rovers	58	(1)
1983–1989	Liverpool	98	(2)
1989–1991	Leeds United	19	(1)
1989–1990	→ Plymouth Argyle (loan)	5	(0)
1990–1991	→ Blackburn Rovers (loan)	6	(0)
Total		186	(4)

International career
1982	League of Ireland XI	?	(0)
1982–1983	Republic of Ireland U21	4	(0)
1990	Republic of Ireland B	1	(0)
1984–1986	Republic of Ireland	15	(0)
- * Club domestic league appearances and goals

James Martin Beglin (born 29 July 1963) is an Irish former professional footballer who played as a defender, and a current co-commentator for RTÉ, CBS Sports, TNT Sports, and Premier League Productions.

== Playing career ==
=== Shamrock Rovers ===
Beglin played schoolboy football in his native city with Bolton and Waterford Bohs before joining Shamrock Rovers in 1980. He went on to spend three years at Milltown, making four appearances in Europe and scoring one goal.

In 1982 Beglin was part of the League of Ireland XI that toured New Zealand where they played the New Zealand men's national football team.

=== Liverpool ===
Beglin was the last signing made by Liverpool manager Bob Paisley when he joined from Shamrock Rovers for £20,000 in May 1983. He was gradually brought into the first team over the next 18 months by Joe Fagan, before being given regular games in the left back slot by new player-manager Kenny Dalglish as a replacement for Alan Kennedy in the 1985–86 season. Beglin made his debut in the left sided midfield position on 10 November 1984 in a 1–1 league draw with Southampton at Anfield. He scored his first goal for Liverpool on 10 April 1985 in a 4–0 European Cup semi-final first leg victory over Greek side Panathinaikos at Anfield.

Liverpool won the League championship and FA Cup, pipping Merseyside rivals Everton to both, with Beglin winning medals for each. He also began playing for the Republic of Ireland, gaining a total of 15 caps.

In January 1987, in a League Cup fifth round game, his leg was badly broken following a mistimed tackle from Everton's Gary Stevens. Liverpool defender Alan Hansen stated that the tackle was "a mile high and an hour late". Recovering from the break, Beglin sustained a knee cartilage injury playing for Liverpool's reserves in October 1988.

=== Leeds United ===
In June 1989, he joined Leeds United, where he helped the club to become Second Division champions and spent periods on loan with both Plymouth Argyle and Blackburn Rovers before a recurrence of his knee injury forced him into an early retirement in 1991, when still only 27.

== International career ==
After caps with the Under-21 side, Beglin playing for the senior Republic of Ireland in 1984, earning 15 caps.

== Media career ==
Beglin is a co-commentator for BT Sport, Premier League Productions, and CBS Sports, and was a co-commentator on ITV and a sports journalist on Granada Television. He commentated for RTÉ in the 2014 and 2018 FIFA World Cups. In the past for RTÉ he has worked on coverage of Premier League, UEFA Champions League matches and Republic of Ireland internationals. Beglin has also been employed by Liverpool as a voice–over artist for the club's official DVD and video releases. He has also been the co-commentator in the Pro Evolution Soccer video game series since Pro Evolution Soccer 2011, alongside Jon Champion and later Peter Drury. On 4 May 2021, during a live broadcast of a UEFA Champions League semi-final, Beglin attributed Paris Saint-Germain's Argentine midfielder Ángel Di María's red card to his "Latino temperament", for which he later apologized.

== Honours ==
Liverpool

- Football League First Division: 1985–86
- FA Cup: 1985–86
- FA Charity Shield: 1986
- Football League Super Cup: 1986
- European Cup runner-up: 1984–85

Leeds United

- Football League Second Division: 1989–90
