= Seema Jaswal =

English television and radio presenter (born 1985)

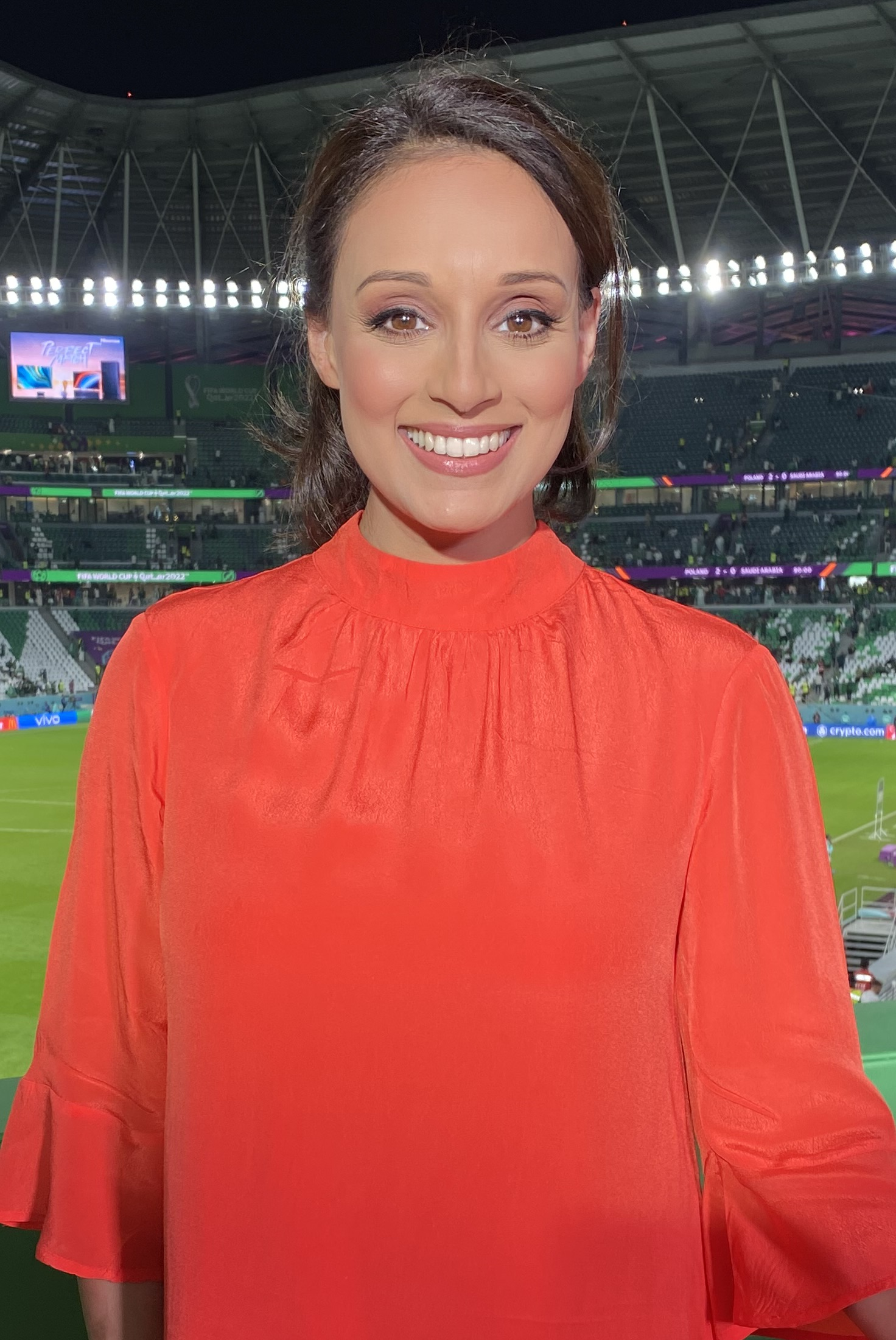
- Jaswal at Education City Stadium, Qatar 2022
- Born: 28 January 1985 (age 41)
- Education: Royal Holloway, University of London
- Occupations: Television presenter and radio presenter
- Employer(s): ITV; BBC; IMG – Premier League Global Content

Seema Jaswal (born 28 January 1985) is a British sports broadcaster and television presenter. Her work has included the FIFA World Cup, the UEFA European Championship, the UEFA Champions League, the Premier League, the FA Cup, international women's football and the BBC's snooker coverage. She pres ents the Premier League's international coverage, has fronted major football tournaments for ITV Sport and has also worked for broadcasters including BT Sport, CBS Sports, Star Sports and ZEE5.

Jaswal was one of ITV's main presenters at the 2022 FIFA World Cup. The Independent reported that in fronting the broadcaster's coverage of Morocco against Portugal she became the first woman to lead the presentation of a men's World Cup quarter-final for a broadcaster in the United Kingdom, and that she had earlier formed ITV's first all-female panel for a men's World Cup game with Eni Aluko and Karen Carney. In 2021 she presented UEFA Euro 2020 for ITV and joined BT Sport's UEFA Champions League presenting team. She subsequently presented the 2023 FIFA Women's World Cup and, with Laura Woods, ITV's coverage of UEFA Women's Euro 2025.

== Early life and education ==
Jaswal was born to parents from Uganda and raised in Richmond upon Thames. She completed her schooling at Grey Court School and graduated from Royal Holloway, University of London. Jaswal says she is enthusiastic about sports, particularly tennis.

== Career ==
A sports enthusiast, Jaswal began her career as a runner at Sky Sports as part of the production, which was her springboard to presenting.

The following year Jaswal presented a host of live events including the Zee Carnival at the Olympia Hall, The Franchise Show for The Business Channel and The Independent Music Show in Camden and worked on projects for MTV and Endemol. Jaswal hosted The Entertainment Show, The Voice & Drivetime for Westside Radio.

Jaswal made her TV debut by presenting CBBC Newsround as Sportsround's roving reporter.

Jaswal also presented CBBC's Match of the Day Kickabout. This role saw her travelling the country and meeting young football stars whilst setting them various challenges.

In July 2011, Jaswal became co-host to Matthew Wright on The Wright Stuff on Channel 5.

In 2015 Jaswal relocated to India where she became the face of Indian football for Star Sports presenting the Indian Super League and football show Lets Talk Football.

In 2016 Jaswal returned to the UK presenting Premier Leagues global content flagship shows Kick Off and Fanzone.

In 2017 Jaswal returned to Mumbai to host the first ever FIFA football tournament and live draw in India, 2017 FIFA U-17 World Cup for Sony Six. 2017 also saw Jaswal present the BDO Darts and the Mini Challenge on Channel 4.

2018:

- 2018 FIFA World Cup – ITV
- Football Focus – BBC
- Power8 Sprints Rowing - BT Sport
- UEFA European Under-17 Championship – ITV
- Motorsport - Channel 4
- Gfinity E-Sports Elite Series FIFA 18– Global Television Network
- UEFA Women's Championship – Channel 4

2019:

- Cricket World Cup - Star Sports
- Premier League - Global Television Network
- World Snooker Championship - BBC

2020:

- Rugby League World Cup Draw
- UEFA Champions League – CBS

2021:

- UEFA Euro 2020 – ITV
- UEFA Champions League - BT Sport
- FA Cup - ITV
- Premier League – Amazon

2022:

- UEFA Super Cup - DAZN – CBS
- 2022–23 UEFA Women's Champions League Final – DAZN
- Commonwealth Games - BBC & Global Television Network
- 2022 FIFA World Cup – ITV

=== Guest appearances ===
- The Chase: Celebrity Special 2022
- Catchphrase 2022
- Ted Lasso Season 2, 2021
- Lorraine 2021
- Good Morning Britain 2021
- Sports Funniest Moments 2021
- Gods of Snooker 2021
- The Wright Stuff 2018

=== Charity Ambassador ===
Jaswal is an ambassador to raise awareness for meningitis having contracted meningitis B at the age of 16.

== Personal life ==
Jaswal lives with her husband in West London.
