= Laura Woods =

Laura Woods may refer to:

- Laura Woods (English presenter) (born 1987), English presenter for Sky Sports
- Laura Woods (Irish presenter) (born 1977), Irish presenter
- Laura J. Woods (born 1961), American state senator in Colorado
