= Fort Boyard: Ultimate Challenge =

- Genre: Children's adventure game show
- Based on: Fort Boyard by Jacques Antoine
- Presented by: Laura Hamilton; Geno Segers; Andy Akinwolere
- Theme music composer: Paul Farrer
- Countries of origin: United States (Series 1–2); United Kingdom
- Original language: English
- No. of series: 5
- No. of episodes: 50

Production
- Executive producers: Nigel Pickard; Ged Allen; Pierre Godde
- Producer: Steve Pinhay
- Production locations: Fort Boyard, France
- Running time: 22 minutes (Series 1–2); 52 minutes (Series 3–5)
- Production companies: Adventure Line Productions; The Foundation

Original release
- Network: Disney XD (USA)
- Release: 17 November 2011 – 27 January 2012
- Network: ITV/CITV (UK)
- Release: 1 January 2012 – 17 December 2014

Related
- Fort Boyard UK

Fort Boyard: Ultimate Challenge is a children's game show, based on the French game show Fort Boyard, which aired on CITV in the United Kingdom and Disney XD in the United States. The show is a challenge game where six teams consisting of teenagers compete against each other in a tournament-style competition to become the "Ultimate Conquerors Of The Fort" at the series' finale. It is an updated version of the original French format, which inspired an earlier British version from 1998 to 2003.

== History ==
The series was announced on 7 July 2011 as a two season commission (20 episodes each, half an hour long) from UK broadcaster CITV and US broadcaster Disney Channels Worldwide, who secured global pay rights to the series to air on Disney XD channels except in France and Nordic territories. The series would be co-produced by franchise owners Adventure Line Productions and The Foundation, both subsidiaries of the Zodiak Media Group, with Zodiak handling global distribution rights. The series would feature teenage contestants from the United Kingdom and the United States, while American actor Geno Segers and English TV presenter Laura Hamilton were hired as presenters. The series was filmed in August 2011 and made its global debut on Disney XD in the United States on 17 October 2011.

In June 2012, CITV commissioned a third series of ten sixty-minute episodes, with Disney once again acquiring pay-TV rights in MENA and APAC territories. From this series onwards, the series solely became a British production with Segers being replaced with former Blue Peter presenter Andy Akinwolere as co-presenter alongside Hamilton. The third series began on 8 December 2012 and was simulcast on the ITV network.

CITV commissioned the show for a fourth series in 2013 which began airing on 20 October.

The fifth series began airing on 15 October 2014. The series ended on 17 December 2014 after five series.

== Format ==
Six teams compete against each other in a tournament. In every episode, two teams face each other in a battle to see who is the strongest and toughest team. The challenges are based on toughness, fear and speed. In each season, the teams play three times each; with the two teams which have the most gold coins returning for the final round of the tournament at the series' finale.

In every level, the teams fight to get a key which helps them in the final level of the game in the Treasure Chamber. If they get three (five in series 3, 4 and 5) keys or more at the end of the game, they get the maximum amount of time in the Treasure Chamber (three minutes); but if they get two (four from series 3) keys or less, a time penalty will be dealt out (see below). If a team wins a 4th key (6th or more from series 3), they receive an extra 150 bonus coins per key which are added to their final total.

=== Challenges ===
Fort Boyard: Ultimate Challenge uses exactly the same games like in the original show; but with different names, no lock-ins and may also be slightly adapted to suit the show. For example, in Boiler Room the contestant is not handcuffed to the pipe; instead must move a chain with the key on through the maze and out to the exit within the time limit.

Each solo team challenge is against the water timer (known as a clepsydre) usually set at either 1:30, 2:00 or 2:30 minutes. Some games (such as Tightrope and nearly all duels) require a code to open the box containing the key, which is outside the room or nearby the other team members. Games involving members of both teams are not against the water clock and are known as "duels".

==== Regular challenges ====
In order of first appearance:

Introduced in Series 1:

Duels

- Caterpillar
- Terror Walk
- Key To The Sea
- Hanging Tough
- Shrinking Room (2:00)
- Power Pull
- Rapid Ascent
- Ladder Race
- Ocean Plunge (solo in series 4) (1:45/time unlimited)
- Raft Race (2:30)
- Tension Bridge
- Raging Sea (alternate version of "Ocean Plunge")

Solo games

- Slot Machine (1:45)
- Dark Descent (2:00)
- Pots of Fear (1:45/1:30)
- Human Catapult/Leap Of Faith (0:30)
- Running Water (2:00/2:30)
- Creature Count (2:00)
- Tight Rope (2:30/3:00)
- Sky Bike (1:30/2:45)
- Candy Roll (2:00/1:45)
- Giant Chopsticks (2:30/2:00)
- Boiler Room (2:15/2:00)
- Giant Loom (2:00)
- Power Pedal (2:30/2:00)
- Spiders and Scorpions (2:30/2:00)
- Sunken House (2:00)
- Mission Impossible (2:15/2:30)
- Spider's Web (previously 'Human Catapult' Version 2) (2:30)

Introduced in Series 2:

- Punch Ball (2:00/1:30)
- Unstable Chair (2:00/2:15)
- Turnstile (1:30)
- Snake Pit (2:30/3:00)
- Leap of Faith Version 2 (1:30/1:00)
- Infernal Ladder (Duel) (2:00)

Introduced in Series 3:

Duels

- Trapdoor
- Poles Apart
- Monkey Ladder
- Balancing Balls
- Vertical Ascent
- Giant Catapults

Solo games

- Pole Position (2:00)
- Face to Face (2:15/2:00)
- Rock the Boat (2:00/1:30)
- Rocket Launcher (1:45/1:30)
- Coffee Grinder (2:00)
- Swings (2:00)
- Cold Room (2:00)
- Red Alert (2:00/2:15)
- Creature Code (alternate version of 'Creature Count') (2:00)
- Underwater Dome (alternate version of 'Sunken House') (2:30)
- Gyroscope (1:45/1:30)
- Pyramid (2:00/1:30)
- Underwater Net-Ball (2:30/2:00)
- Walk the Plank (2:00)
- Sea-Saw (3:00/2:00)
- Round the World (2:00)
- Submerged Cage (2:30/2:15)
- Human Bell (1:00/1:30)

Introduced in Series 4:

Duels

- Key To The Sea Ver. 2
- Stand Tough
- Shrinking Room Ver. 2
- Underwater Balloons
- Hammocks (0:20)
- Pedal Pump (1:45)
- Deadly Drop

Solo games

- Dizzy Dash (2:00/1:45)
- Ring Run (2:00/2:30)
- Haunted House (2:00/1:45)
- Spin Cycle (2:00)
- Pressure Tank (2:30)
- Library (1:30)
- Balancing Brollies (2:00)

Introduced in Series 5:

Duels

- Blind Faith
- Tug of Four
- Pressure Pull
- Equilibrium
- Sunken Spheres
- Joust

Solo games

- Tiger Terror (2:30/3:00)
- Ketchup Factory (2:00/2:30)
- Balance Bike (time unlimited)/(1:00)
- Garbage Grinder (2:00)
- Giant Spring (2:00)
- Ocean Climb (2:15/2:30)
- Sea Spin (1:30)
- Flooded Prison (2:00)

==== Council duels ====
Before the teams go to the Treasure Chamber, the last challenge in every episode is a non-timed duel in the Council "hallway" (an open area on the second floor close to where "Cold Room" is located) between both teams.

Tests usually involve a level of skill and speed; such as building a tower with shaped blocks, using chopsticks to write the word "Boyard" on a pole or hammering nails into a piece of wood. The whole team(s) take part in the duel and the winners receive the final key of the day. Games played so far include:

In order of first appearance:

- Surface Tension
- Tipping Point
- Tower Build
- Balance of Forces
- Letter Pick
- Hammer Time
- Reflex
- Weights
- Hang Nail
- Floating Towers
- Dominoes
- Shape Stack
- Roach Race

=== The Treasure Chamber ===
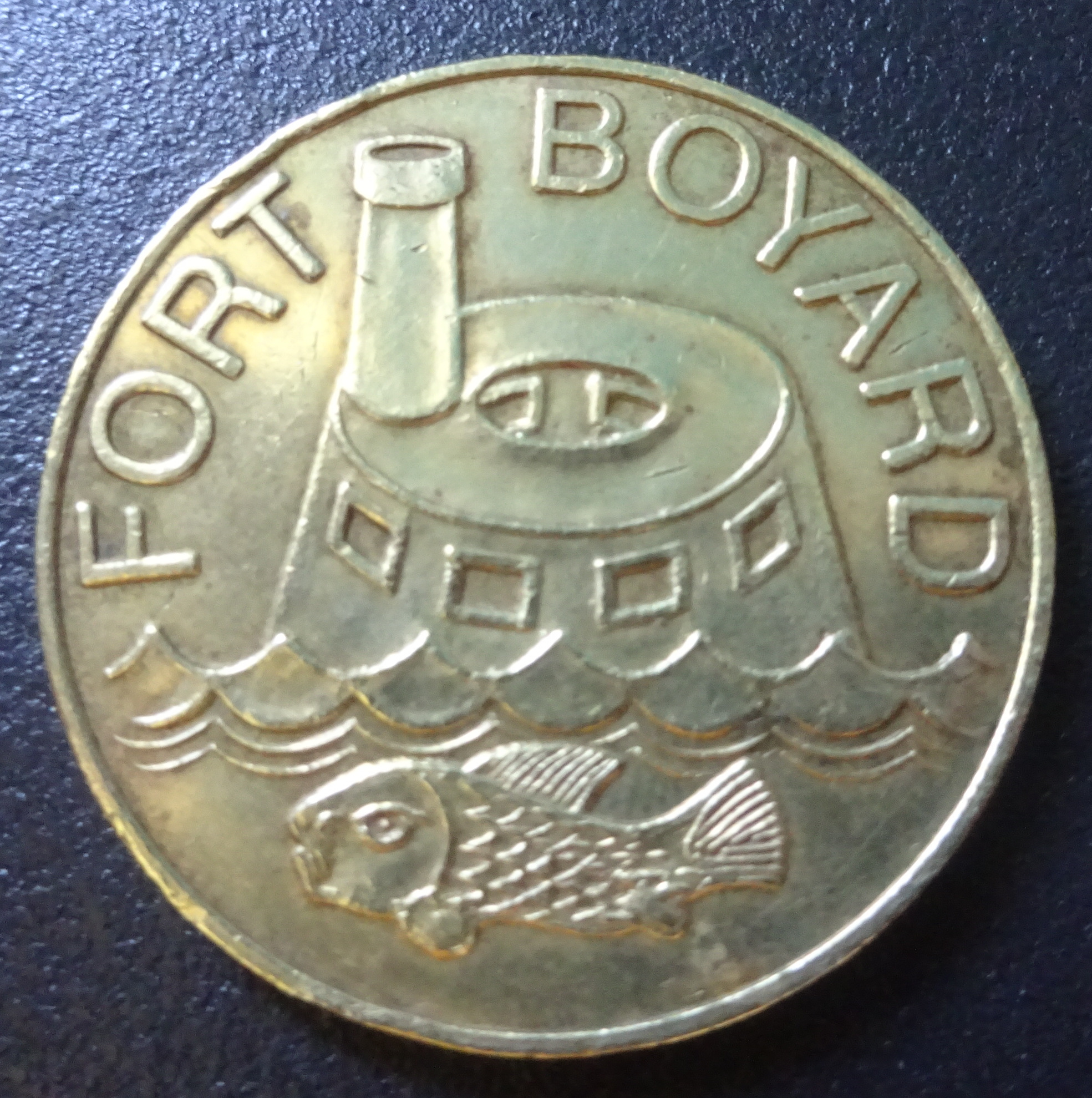
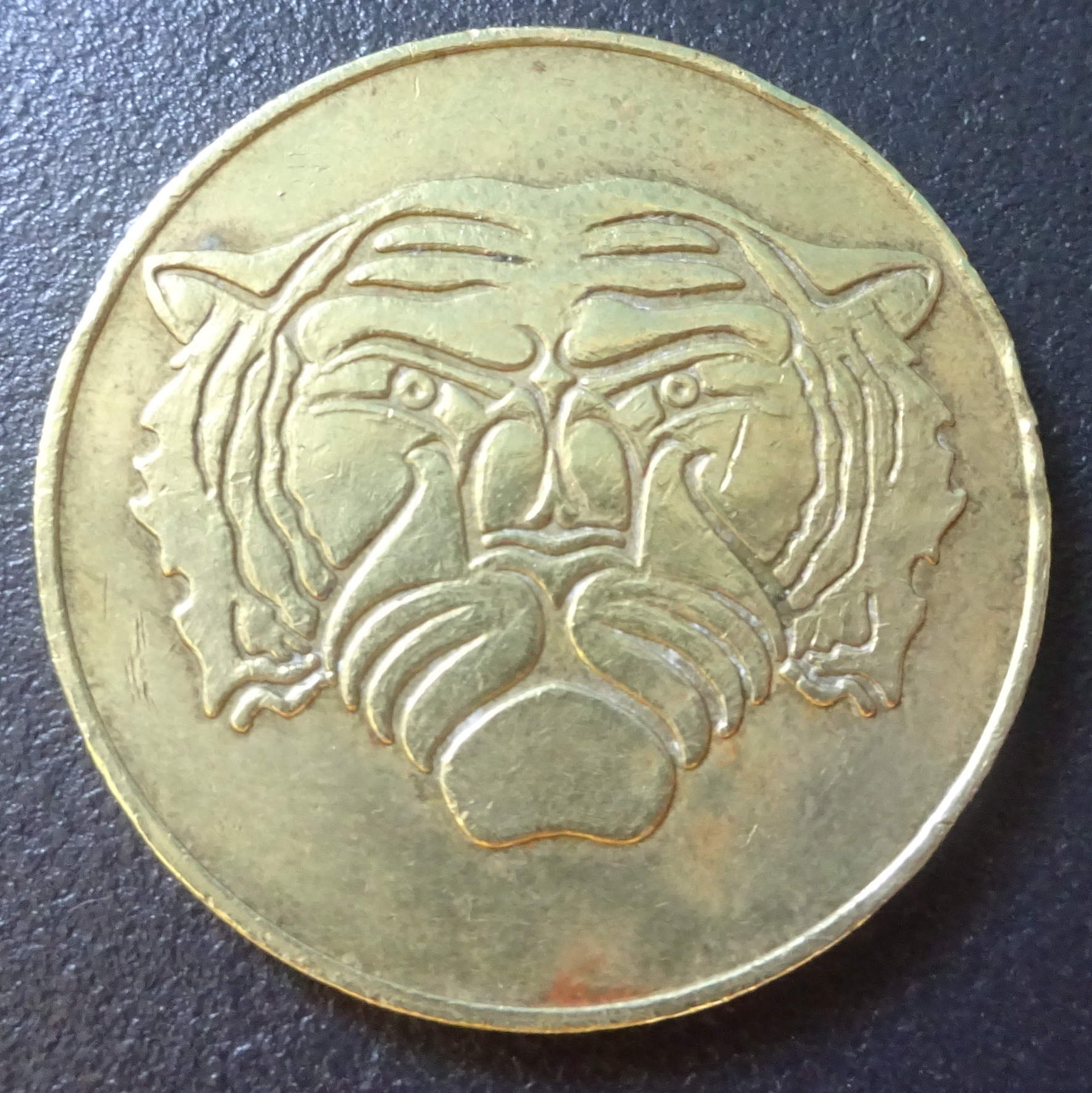
As in the original format, the boyar coin is the currency that participants must collect in the treasure room.

The Treasure Chamber is the climax to every episode of Fort Boyard: Ultimate Challenge. The gold is stored here, which is guarded by the fort's tigers (only in series 4 and 5).

==== Series 1 and 2 ====
Before they enter the treasure chamber, every team is handed a scroll with a plan of the board (a giant alphabet chessboard), which is composed of Georgian letters and the word "Fort Boyard" is also written out on it. On this chessboard, they must place four circular plates of colour, as shown in the plan. These plates are hidden in the decorative elements of the chamber (a treasure chest, barrel or underneath ropes). They must therefore find where they are hidden. Boxes are suspended in the fountain and the key for the coins is on top of a vertical rod above and on either side of the Fountain.

Once a team has found and placed their four plates in the right place, the captain returns his/her hand to a tiger's head located nearby the entrance. If correct, the key is released to open their chest containing the coins. Once the chest is opened, coins fall into the fountain below. The team members must collect as many of these coins as possible and put them into a Plexiglas box near the entrance.

At 0:20 seconds from the end of the 3 minutes, the bell (rung by Hamilton) sounds and the gate of the Treasure Chamber begins to descend, meaning that the eight candidates must get out before it closes.

Then it is time to weigh the coins; two candidates from each team take turns placing their container on the scales to set the number of points scored by the team. At the end of the show, the ranking of teams is updated compared to previous results.

Keys for the Treasure Chamber

No. of keys	Time awarded
4	3:00 minutes + 150 bonus coins
3	3:00 minutes
2	2:40 minutes
1	2:40 minutes (for 3 team members), 2:20 minutes (for the remaining team member)
0	2:40 minutes (for 2 team members), 2:20 minutes (for the remaining team members)

==== Series 3 to 5 ====
Several changes were made to the Treasure Chamber in this series, including a new time structure and layout. For example, the crests are not hidden and the floor plan is placed on a board outside and the teams have to memorise it.

Keys for the Treasure Chamber

No. of keys	Time awarded
6 or 7	3:00 minutes + 150 bonus coins per key No time penalty
5	No time penalty (3:00)
4	10 second time penalty (2:50)
3	20 second time penalty (2:40)
2	30 second time penalty (2:30)
1	40 second time penalty (2:20)
0	50 second time penalty (2:10)

=== Teams ===
Each season of the show features over 24 participants divided up into six teams, each featuring a colour and symbol of an animal. The participants wear coloured T-shirts with their colour and symbol (and in Season 3 onwards, their first names as well) to showcase what team they are on. Each team also has a captain. For the first four seasons, the team names were Yellow Scorpions, Red Vipers, Silver Dragons, Green Jaguars, Blue Sharks and White Falcons. In the fifth season, the team names were changed to Silver Rhinos, Orange Tigers, Lime Crocodiles, Black Tarantulas, Golden Eagles and Purple Cobras.

In series 1 and 2, the participants were of 13 to 19 years of age, consisting of two British and American contestants each, with three boys and one girl in each team. In Series 3 to 5, all contestants were British and consisted of 13–18 year olds in Season 3, and 12–18 year olds in Seasons 4–5. This time, there were two boys and two girls in each team.

==== Series 1 to 4 ====
- Yellow Scorpions
  - Series 1: Louis, Shona, Jake, Nathan
  - Series 2: Shane, Zachary, Billy, Emily
  - Series 3: Tia, Joe, Charlotte, Jay
  - Series 4: Ruby, George, Dean, Paige
- Red Vipers
  - Series 1: Ashley, Tashi, Jimmy, William
  - Series 2: Jack, Kalium, Matt, Laura
  - Series 3: Lauren, Angharad, Jamie, John
  - Series 4: Tahlia, Jack, Suzanne, Nyv
- Silver Dragons
  - Series 1: Charlie, Kennedy, Kyle, Harry
  - Series 2: Charles, Sashank, Lara, James
  - Series 3: Megan, Ash, Sam, Sophie
  - Series 4: Alex, Maddie, Hayden, Maryam
- Green Jaguars
  - Series 1: Matt, Ryan, Xavier, Amy
  - Series 2: Jordan, Jackson, Joseph, Imogen
  - Series 3: Tom, Izzy, Mike, Célést
  - Series 4: Sophie, Charlii, Elias, Jordan
- Blue Sharks
  - Series 1: Max, Natalie, Shaun, Ivan
  - Series 2: Simon, Adrienne, Alex, David
  - Series 3: Alec, Michael, Abi, Shannon
  - Series 4: Tim, Katie, Rahman, Josie
- White Falcons
  - Series 1: Kasey, Katherine, Joe, Peter
  - Series 2: Mitchell, Julia, Zach, Callum
  - Series 3: Beth, Jack, Jake, Courtney
  - Series 4: Jake, Ella, Josh, Daisy

==== Series 5 ====
- Grey Rhinos: Sam, Katy, Josh, J'nae
- Orange Tigers: Claire, Charlie, Alex, Corey
- Burgundy Cobras: Finton, Olivia, Oli, Scarlet
- Black Tarantulas: Abi, Harry, Lauren, Charlie
- Golden Eagles: Ben, Chloe, Brandon, Georgia
- Green Crocodiles: Katy, Jack, Amelia, Alex

== Filming ==
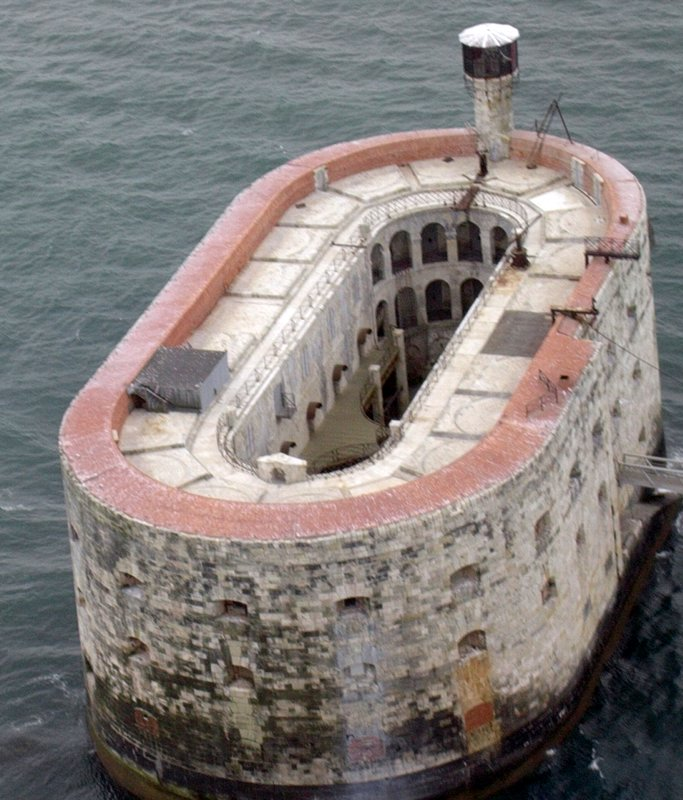
Fort Boyard from the air

Fort Boyard: Ultimate Challenge is set and filmed on the Fort Boyard fortress, on the west coast of France.

From a broadcasting perspective, Fort Boyard itself was refurbished during 1988–89 to become, essentially, a large outdoor television studio. The Fort has its own doctor, catering facilities, as well as production gallery and veterinary centre. The Fort is equipped with 10 portable television cameras, one camera crane for overhead shots, one under-water camera as well as a number of smaller cameras which specifically cover individual games and challenges around the Fort.

Filming took place between 9–15 July 2011; consisting of two seasons of 10 episodes each. A third season was filmed from 7–14 July 2012, with a further 10 episodes made. The fourth was filmed from 18–25 June 2013 and the fifth from 22–27 June 2014.

== Episodes ==
=== Series 1 ===
Episode No.	Teams	Air date (USA)	Air date (UK)	Winner
1	Yellow Scorpions Vs Red Vipers	17 October 2011	1 January 2012	Yellow Scorpions
2	White Falcons Vs Blue Sharks	18 October 2011	7 January 2012	White Falcons
3	Silver Dragons Vs Green Jaguars	19 October 2011	14 January 2012	Green Jaguars
4	Red Vipers Vs Blue Sharks	24 October 2011	21 January 2012	Blue Sharks
5	Yellow Scorpions Vs Green Jaguars	25 October 2011	28 January 2012	Yellow Scorpions
6	Silver Dragons Vs White Falcons	26 October 2011	4 February 2012	White Falcons
7	Yellow Scorpions Vs Blue Sharks	1 November 2011	11 February 2012	Yellow Scorpions
8	Red Vipers Vs Silver Dragons	2 November 2011	18 February 2012	Red Vipers
9	Green Jaguars Vs White Falcons	7 November 2011	25 February 2012	Green Jaguars
10 (Final)	Yellow Scorpions Vs Green Jaguars	7 November 2011	3 March 2012	Yellow Scorpions

- Conquerors of The Fort: Yellow Scorpions

=== Series 2 ===
Episode No.	Teams	Air date (USA)	Air date (UK)	Winner
1	White Falcons Vs Blue Sharks	16 January 2012	10 March 2012	Blue Sharks
2	Yellow Scorpions Vs Red Vipers	17 January 2012	17 March 2012	Red Vipers
3	Silver Dragons Vs Green Jaguars	18 January 2012	24 March 2012	Silver Dragons
4	Red Vipers Vs Blue Sharks	19 January 2012	31 March 2012	Red Vipers
5	Silver Dragons Vs White Falcons	20 January 2012	1 April 2012	Silver Dragons
6	Yellow Scorpions Vs Green Jaguars	23 January 2012	7 April 2012	Yellow Scorpions
7	Silver Dragons Vs Red Vipers	24 January 2012	8 April 2012	Silver Dragons
8	Yellow Scorpions Vs Blue Sharks	25 January 2012	14 April 2012	Blue Sharks
9	Green Jaguars Vs White Falcons	26 January 2012	21 April 2012	White Falcons
10 (Final)	Silver Dragons Vs Blue Sharks	27 January 2012	28 April 2012	Silver Dragons

- Conquerors of The Fort: Silver Dragons

=== Series 3 ===
Episode No.	Teams	Air date (UK)	Winner
1	Green Jaguars Vs White Falcons	8 December 2012	White Falcons
2	Blue Sharks Vs Silver Dragons	9 December 2012	Blue Sharks
3	Red Vipers Vs Yellow Scorpions	15 December 2012	Yellow Scorpions
4	Green Jaguars Vs Yellow Scorpions	16 December 2012	Green Jaguars
5	Silver Dragons Vs White Falcons	22 December 2012	White Falcons
6	Red Vipers Vs Blue Sharks	23 December 2012	Blue Sharks
7	Blue Sharks Vs White Falcons	26 December 2012	Blue Sharks
8	Red Vipers Vs Green Jaguars	27 December 2012	Green Jaguars
9	Silver Dragons Vs Yellow Scorpions	29 December 2012	Yellow Scorpions
10 (Final)	Green Jaguars Vs Blue Sharks	30 December 2012	Green Jaguars

- Conquerors Of The Fort: Green Jaguars

Note: episodes 7–10 were not simulcast on both UK channels as usual; the airdates are for ITV1 only. CITV aired these at a later date, due to schedule changes and to celebrate its thirtieth anniversary.

=== Series 4 ===
Episode No.	Teams	Air date (UK)	Winner
1	Yellow Scorpions Vs Blue Sharks	20 October 2013	Yellow Scorpions
2	White Falcons Vs Green Jaguars	27 October 2013	Green Jaguars
3	Red Vipers Vs Silver Dragons	3 November 2013	Red Vipers
4	Silver Dragons Vs Green Jaguars	10 November 2013	Green Jaguars
5	White Falcons Vs Yellow Scorpions	17 November 2013	White Falcons
6	Red Vipers Vs Blue Sharks	24 November 2013	Red Vipers
7	Yellow Scorpions Vs Silver Dragons	1 December 2013	Silver Dragons
8	White Falcons Vs Red Vipers	8 December 2013	White Falcons
9	Blue Sharks Vs Green Jaguars	15 December 2013	Green Jaguars
10 (Final)	White Falcons Vs Green Jaguars	22 December 2013	Green Jaguars

- Conquerors Of The Fort: Green Jaguars

=== Series 5 ===
Episode No.	Teams	Air date (UK)	Winner
1	Grey Rhinos Vs Orange Tigers	15 October 2014	Grey Rhinos
2	Burgundy Cobras Vs Black Tarantulas	22 October 2014	Black Tarantulas
3	Green Crocodiles Vs Golden Eagles	29 October 2014	Green Crocodiles
4	Golden Eagles Vs Burgundy Cobras	5 November 2014	Golden Eagles
5	Orange Tigers Vs Black Tarantulas	12 November 2014	Black Tarantulas
6	Grey Rhinos Vs Green Crocodiles	19 November 2014	Green Crocodiles
7	Golden Eagles Vs Orange Tigers	26 November 2014	Golden Eagles
8	Grey Rhinos Vs Burgundy Cobras	3 December 2014	Grey Rhinos
9	Green Crocodiles Vs Black Tarantulas	10 December 2014	Black Tarantulas
10 (Final)	Grey Rhinos Vs Black Tarantulas	17 December 2014	Black Tarantulas

- Conquerors Of The Fort: Black Tarantulas

== Transmissions ==
=== Disney XD (USA) ===
Season	Episodes	Originally aired	
Season	Episodes	First aired	Last aired
1	10	17 October 2011	7 November 2011
2	10	16 January 2012	27 January 2012

=== CITV (UK) ===
Season	Episodes	Originally aired	
Season	Episodes	First aired	Last aired
1	10	1 January 2012	3 March 2012
2	10	10 March 2012	28 April 2012
3	10	8 December 2012	30 December 2012
4	10	20 October 2013	22 December 2013
5	10	15 October 2014	17 December 2014

== Awards and nominations ==
Year	Award	Category	Result
2014	British Academy Children's Awards	Best Children's Entertainment	Nominated
