= Peter Drury =

English football commentator (born 1967)

- Born: Peter Donald Drury; 23 September 1967 (age 59); Witham, England
- Education: St John's School, Leatherhead; University of Hull
- Occupation: Football commentator
- Employers: Current: Sky Sports (2023–); NBC Sports (2022–); UEFA (2023-); Host Broadcast Services (2014–); Konami (eFootball); Former: BBC Radio (1990–1998); ITV Sport (1998–2013); Premier League Productions (1998–2023); BT Sport (2013–2023); Amazon Prime Video (2019–2022); CBS Sports (2020–2022); Pitch International (2020–2022)
- Known for: Sports commentary (Association football)

Peter Donald Drury (born 23 September 1967) is a British sports commentator who currently works for Sky Sports in the United Kingdom and NBC Sports in the United States as the lead commentator for their Premier League coverage.

Drury was formerly with ITV Sport as its second-choice football commentator, a role he had held from 1998 to 2013. He went on to freelance for Premier League Productions on its international coverage of the Premier League until May 2022 but still does occasional commentaries for them. Drury previously freelanced for CBS Sports (US) on its English-language coverage of UEFA Champions League and the Europa League from 2020 to 2022, with Pitch International for the English-language world feed of the EFL Cup through 2022, with Amazon Prime Video for its Premier League coverage in the United Kingdom through the 2022–23 season, with BT Sport on coverage of the UEFA Europa League and UEFA Europa Conference League through the 2022–23 season, for UEFA for the English-language world feed of the UEFA Europa League Finals in 2023-2025, and for Host Broadcast Services (HBS) for the English-language world feed of the men's FIFA World Cup in 2014, 2018 and 2022 as well as the men's UEFA Euro 2024.

Drury is renowned for his poetic and literary approach to football commentary, often described as football's "poet laureate". His style is characterized by the use of metaphor, vivid imagery, and emotional resonance that transforms key moments into "epic sagas". Drury's commentary frequently employs figurative language with metaphor being his most dominant device to create an immersive experience for viewers. He is known for his explosive, rhyme-laced monologues and his ability to capture the historical weight and narrative significance of major matches. Fans and critics alike have noted his "uncanny ability to find the perfect metaphor" that elevates a simple goal or save into a moment of sporting immortality. Drury has won the Football Supporters' Association Commentator of the Year award twice (2019, 2021) and the Sports Journalists' Association Commentator of the Year award in 2020. He cites BBC Radio's Peter Jones, whom he describes as having a "beautiful, authoritative, and poetic voice," as his commentary idol.

== Early life ==
Peter Drury was born on 24 September 1967 in Braintree, Essex, England. His father was a Church of England vicar based in Kent. The first club he supported as a four-year-old was West Ham United, but he has since gone on to support different clubs, most notably Watford as he now lives in Hertfordshire. He went to St John's School, Leatherhead in Surrey.

While growing up, Drury's commentary idol was BBC Radio's Peter Jones, who Drury describes as having a "beautiful, authoritative, and poetic voice".

On 5 November 1985, at which time he was an 18-year-old student studying at the University of Hull, he attended a live football match for the first time at Boothferry Park, which was a Full Members' Cup semi-final between Hull City and Middlesbrough. He was usually the first man at the ground a couple of hours before the other spectators came flooding in.

He worked as an accountant for a period of one month after graduating from university. Before joining BBC Radio Leeds, he worked for sports journalism agency Hayter's.

== Career ==
=== Beginnings with BBC Radio (1990–98) ===
On 1 March 1990, Drury commenced his first broadcasting job with BBC Radio Leeds, and it was during his time there that Leeds United were champions of the Football League First Division in the 1991–92 season. His early works with Radio Leeds included matches involving Halifax Town, Bradford City and Huddersfield Town. He also commentated on both legs of Leeds United's UEFA Champions League first round tie with VfB Stuttgart in September 1992, in which after coming back from a 3–0 first-leg deficit to win 4–1, he remarked that their fans were 'proud as punch' of Howard Wilkinson's team and they were to be eliminated on away goals, but it went into a play-off which they won 2–1 on 9 October.

He soon moved to Five Live following its launch on 28 March 1994. His credits include the 1996 UEFA Champions League Final (alongside future ITV colleague Jon Champion) and UEFA Euro 96, where he covered Group D matches involving Portugal and Turkey. In 1997, he also commentated on The Open Championship and the Ryder Cup with 5 Live.

=== Televised commentary (1997–present) ===
Drury later moved on to Broadcasting House in London at the start of 1997–98 season where he covered matches for Match of the Day including Sheffield Wednesday vs Everton on Saturday 4 October 1997 at Hillsborough Stadium.

He then joined ITV in February 1998 and his first match for the network was a replay of an FA Cup sixth round tie between Sheffield United and Coventry City on 17 March. After finishing 1–1 in both the original and replay matches, the Blades came out victorious, winning 3–1 on penalties. He was immediately selected to be part of the commentary team as their junior correspondent for the 1998 FIFA World Cup in France, replacing John Helm. During his 15 years with ITV, Drury commentated on four World Cups (1998–2010) and four European Championship tournaments (2000–2012). He also commentated on the UEFA Champions League, UEFA Cup / Europa League, ITV's 'The Premiership' (coverage of the English Premier League between 2001 and 2004), 'The Championship' (coverage of the Football League Championship between 2004 and 2009) and the This is Football video game series, starting with 2 (2000). Other than football, he commentated on The Boat Race (between 2005 and 2009) and Grand Slam of Darts, as well as snooker tournaments such as the short-lived Nations Cup and the inaugural Power Snooker tournament in 2010.

Drury commentated on the 2014 FIFA World Cup final match between Germany and Argentina on 13 July 2014 at the Maracanã Stadium. In the summer of 2013, he left ITV to join BT Sport for their coverage of the Premier League, FA Cup, UEFA Champions League and UEFA Europa League.

In 2015, Drury replaced Jon Champion as the primary commentator in the Pro Evolution Soccer video game series, starting with Pro Evolution Soccer 2016, having also narrated Sony's This Is Football series earlier.

During the 2014 FIFA World Cup and the 2018 FIFA World Cup, he commentated on matches for FIFA's international feed and its YouTube channel, including the final between France and Croatia.

He has covered most of the Premier League matches alongside co-commentator Jim Beglin, whom he has worked with since 1995 including his early work with 5 live. Drury insists that viewers normally tune in to watch the match and not because of both of them.

He signed with SuperSport in 2019. Drury joined CBS Sports (USA) for its UEFA Champions League and UEFA Europa League coverage in August 2020, as the second-choice play-by-play commentator (behind former ITV colleague Clive Tyldesley).

On 31 May 2022, following the conclusion of the 2021–22 season, Drury announced that he had left Premier League Productions, but he would continue to commentate on the Premier League into next season after joining NBC Sports, replacing Arlo White (who was then signed by LIV Golf) as their lead play-by-play commentator. His position was confirmed on 6 July 2022.

On 18 June 2023, it was announced that Drury would join Sky Sports, doing one game a week on Sunday, Monday, or midweek. He will continue calling games for NBC Sports for Saturday 12:30 p.m. ET games.

He was again part of the commentary team for the worldwide audience in the 2022 and 2026 FIFA World Cups, which saw him reunited with his ex-BBC Radio 5 Live colleague Simon Brotherton on both respective occasions.

== Style ==
Drury has been noted for his expressive and poetic style of commentary.
