= Felicity Hannah =

British journalist and broadcaster

Felicity Hannah is a British broadcaster and journalist working for BBC News, BBC Radio 5 Live and BBC Radio 4, specialising in business and economic news. She is the regular presenter of Money Box Live and a regular presenter of Wake Up To Money and Today's business news slots.

== Early life and education ==
Hannah was born on a British Army base in Germany. Back in England, she attended Princethorpe College in Warwickshire until 2001. Hannah attended the University of Edinburgh between 2001 and 2005 where she gained a Master of Arts (Scotland) in Philosophy.

== Career ==
Before being a journalist focusing on business and economic issues, Hannah was a tour guide who educated about and showed people around the streets below Edinburgh.

Hannah worked in print journalism for a number of years following her graduation from university, writing for various outlets. She worked as head of desk at Adfero between 2007 and 2009 and as editor of Govnet between 2008 and 2009.

As of 2018, Hannah was a personal finance reporter at the BBC. She began co-presenting Wake Up To Money on BBC Radio 5 Live in 2019 and began presenting some editions of Money Box on BBC Radio 4 in the same year. In the last three months of 2021, Hannah presented more episodes of Wake Up To Money than she did before or after those months. She began presenting Money Box Live, Money Box's sibling programme featuring listener questions, regularly in 2022.

In 2022, Hannah presented a series of editions of One to One on BBC Radio 4 in which she interviewed people about the thrill which being scared provides for people.

Between April 2022 and April 2023, Hannah co-presented The Big Green Money Show with businessperson and Dragons' Den star Deborah Meaden; the show was broadcast on BBC Radio 5 Live on Friday mornings. The show initially had a ten-week run of episodes.

Hannah was appointed the new permanent host of Money Box Live on BBC Radio 4 in September 2023.

As of early 2023, Hannah was a freelancer. In 2024, Hannah was twice shortlisted for the Wincott Foundation Award, an award for perceivedly excellent business and money-related journalism. As of 2024, Hannah appeared regularly on Morning Live as an expert in money-related topics.

As of 2025, Hannah is the main presenter of Money Box Live and a regular presenter of Wake Up To Money, as well as a presenter of business news on 5 Live Breakfast and Today on BBC Radio 4. She also appears less regularly on television, presenting business news on BBC Breakfast and other BBC News programmes. She continues to write about money-related topics for online outlets.

Hannah has sat in for other presenters on non-business news programmes on BBC Radio 5 Live, such as Drive.

In the late 2010s, she completed at least almost all the writing of a novel. She is a patron of Humanists UK.

== Personal life ==
In 2018, a series of tweets (which are now X posts) by Hannah went viral; in the tweets she discussed her close befriending of a woman who was very considerably older than her, following the woman's death, and also recommended that people where appropriate try to become friendlier, particularly to older adults.
