= Paul Lewis (broadcaster) =

British financial journalist and broadcaster

Paul Lewis (born 1948) is a British freelance financial journalist and broadcaster on BBC television and radio, including as presenter of Money Box on BBC Radio 4.

== Education ==
Lewis was educated at Maidstone Grammar School, a state grammar school in the town of Maidstone in Kent, followed by the University of Stirling, from which he graduated in Psychology in the 1970s.

== Life and career ==
Lewis is best known as the presenter of Money Box and Money Box Live on BBC Radio 4, Your Money on BBC World Service and previously worked on the BBC Radio 5 Wake Up to Money radio show.

He also regularly appears on other BBC Television programmes such as BBC Breakfast, BBC News Channel and radio programmes such as You and Yours, Woman's Hour, Analysis or news radio programmes like Today, The World at One, and PM. He also appears on Rip Off Britain as an expert on financial matters such as pensions.

Lewis also writes the monthly Money Works feature in SAGA magazine and contributes to articles on the BBC News website, the Radio Times, Money Marketing and other newspaper publications.

Outside financial journalism, he is an authority on the Victorian writer Wilkie Collins and one of the editors of the first complete edition of his letters, published in 2005.

== Awards ==
Lewis has won numerous awards for his financial and broadcast journalism, receiving his first award in 1986. He was given a lifetime achievement award by the Association of British Insurers in 2006, and named Best Broadcast Journalist by the Association of Investment Companies in 2011. He has won the Headline Money Awards Broadcast Journalist of the year five times; most recently in 2013.

He was awarded an honorary doctorate by the University of Essex in July 2013.

== Publications ==
- Paul Lewis, "Pay Less Tax", Age Concern Books, London 2009, ISBN 978-0-86242-446-6
- Paul Lewis, "Making Your Money Work for Your Future", Help the Aged, London 2008, ISBN 978-1-84598-028-3
- Paul Lewis, "Beat the Banks", Age Concern Books, London 2008, ISBN 978-0-86242-431-2
- Paul Lewis, "Live Long and Prosper", A&C Black, London 2006, ISBN 0-7136-7502-0
- Paul Lewis, "Money Magic", BBC Books, London 2005, ISBN 978-0-56352-201-0
- William Baker, Andrew Gasson, Graham Law, Paul Lewis, "The Public Face of Wilkie Collins" - The Collected Letters, Pickering & Chatto, London 2005. ISBN 1851967648

== Personal life ==
Born in Warrington, Lewis is a self-confessed atheist, vegetarian and hippy. He became a professional journalist after winning an amateur journalism prize in 1986; his journalism enables him to live his alternative ecologically conscious lifestyle.

Lewis has said that he does not invest in the stock market.
