= As It Happens (TV series) =

British documentary television series (1990–1992)

- Genre: Fly-on-the-wall documentary
- Presented by: Michael Groth; Victoria Studd; Paddy Haycocks; Andy Kershaw; Richard Jobson; Pete McCarthy
- Country of origin: United Kingdom
- Original language: English

Production
- Executive producer: Jenny Barraclough
- Producer: Wendy Sturgess
- Production company: Barraclough Carey Productions

Original release
- Network: Channel 4
- Release: 2 January 1990 – 3 November 1992

As It Happens is a British documentary television series made by Barraclough Carey Productions for Channel 4, broadcast between 2 January 1990 and 3 November 1992. The series was transmitted mostly live, with a presenter and a single camera following a story, event or location without editing or second takes.

It ran in two distinct forms. From 1990 it was a weekday-morning strand built around blocks of consecutive editions from a single British location. In 1991 it returned as a weekly late-evening series of self-contained editions from locations around the world.

== Format ==
The British Film Institute describes the series as one "in which viewers are invited to watch presenter and a single camera follow a story, with no editing or second takes". The BFI catalogues it under the genres fly-on-the-wall documentary and travelogue.

The live format was not universal. The BFI record for the 1991 edition from Kuwait notes that, unlike most episodes, it was taped several days in advance, though it was still "filmed continuously on one camera without any editing".

== Production ==
Wendy Sturgess produced or series-produced across the whole run; Jenny Barraclough is credited as producer on early editions and as executive producer from 1991. Other producers included Andy Mayer, Sandra Greenwood and Lorraine Heggessey.

Presenters changed with each location block rather than each series. Michael Groth fronted the London Zoo, River Thames, Scotland, Birmingham and Gulf editions; Victoria Studd the Barbican Centre and St George's Hospital editions; Paddy Haycocks the streets of London and Cowes Week editions; Andy Kershaw the Wormwood Scrubs, seaside and several 1991 editions; Richard Jobson the Israel editions; and Pete McCarthy four of the 1991 editions.

== Daytime series (1990) ==
Throughout 1990 the programme occupied a weekday morning slot on Channel 4 at 11:00. Editions were grouped into blocks of consecutive transmissions from a single location, each block opened by a numbered first edition. Subjects included London Zoo, the River Thames, the streets of London, the East of England Show at Peterborough, HM Prison Wormwood Scrubs, the Barbican Centre, Cowes Week, Scotland, the seaside, St George's Hospital in Tooting and hospitals in Birmingham.

The earliest edition catalogued by the BFI is dated 2 January 1990. A run ended on 11 April 1990, the record for which is annotated "Last programme in the current series". A further series opened on 3 July 1990, annotated "First programme in a resumed series", and closed on 14 September 1990. A third series, annotated "First of a new series", began on 10 December 1990 and consisted of five editions from the Gulf followed by five from Israel, ending on 21 December.

The Gulf editions were described by the BFI as the work of "the first television crew to be allowed to transmit extended coverage of the situation there", covering forces stationed in Saudi Arabia, the minehunter HMS Hurworth, the Desert Rats and Wrens serving with the Royal Fleet Auxiliary.

Some editions were catalogued without a location title and are listed below as untitled.

=== Editions ===
Date	Time	Network	Title	Presenter	BFI ref	TVRDb listing
2 January 1990	Tue 11.00am	Channel 4	London Zoo (1)	Michael Groth	363420	Not listed
11 April 1990	Wed 11.00am	Channel 4	London Zoo (5)	Michael Groth	502223	
3 July 1990	Tue 11.00am	Channel 4	The River Thames (1)	Michael Groth	367766	
5 July 1990	Thu 11.00am	Channel 4	Untitled edition	Not recorded	N-10347255	
9 July 1990	Mon 11.00am	Channel 4	The Streets of London (1)	Paddy Haycocks	502238	
10 July 1990	Tue 11.00am	Channel 4	The Streets of London (2)	Not recorded	5866228	
11 July 1990	Wed 11.00am	Channel 4	The Streets of London (3)	Paddy Haycocks	502239	
12 July 1990	Thu 11.00am	Channel 4	The Streets of London (4)	Not recorded	5866260	
13 July 1990	Fri 11.00am	Channel 4	The Streets of London (5)	Paddy Haycocks	502240	
16 July 1990	Mon 11.00am	Channel 4	East of England Show, Peterborough (1)	Michael Groth	500028	
17 July 1990	Tue 11.00am	Channel 4	East of England Show, Peterborough (2)	Not recorded	5866330	
18 July 1990	Wed 11.00am	Channel 4	East of England Show, Peterborough (3)	Not recorded	5866352	
19 July 1990	Thu 11.00am	Channel 4	East of England Show, Peterborough (4)	Michael Groth	500030	
20 July 1990	Fri 11.00am	Channel 4	East of England Show, Peterborough (5)	Michael Groth	663980	
23 July 1990	Mon 11.00am	Channel 4	HM Prison, Wormwood Scrubs (1)	Andy Kershaw	500036	
24 July 1990	Tue 11.00am	Channel 4	HM Prison, Wormwood Scrubs (2)	Andy Kershaw	500038	
25 July 1990	Wed 11.00am	Channel 4	HM Prison, Wormwood Scrubs (3)	Andy Kershaw	500039	
26 July 1990	Thu 11.00am	Channel 4	HM Prison, Wormwood Scrubs (4)	Andy Kershaw	500040	
27 July 1990	Fri 11.00am	Channel 4	HM Prison, Wormwood Scrubs (5)	Andy Kershaw	500043	
30 July 1990	Mon 11.00am	Channel 4	Barbican Centre, London (1)	Victoria Studd	500020	
31 July 1990	Tue 11.00am	Channel 4	Barbican Centre, London (2)	Victoria Studd	663981	
1 August 1990	Wed 11.00am	Channel 4	Barbican Centre, London (3)	Victoria Studd	663982	
2 August 1990	Thu 11.00am	Channel 4	Untitled edition	Victoria Studd	500021	
3 August 1990	Fri 11.00am	Channel 4	Untitled edition	Victoria Studd	500022	
6 August 1990	Mon 11.00am	Channel 4	Cowes Week (1)	Paddy Haycocks	500024	
7 August 1990	Tue 11.00am	Channel 4	Cowes Week (2)	Paddy Haycocks	663984	
8 August 1990	Wed 11.00am	Channel 4	Cowes Week (3)	Paddy Haycocks	663985	
9 August 1990	Thu 11.00am	Channel 4	Cowes Week (4)	Paddy Haycocks	663986	
10 August 1990	Fri 11.00am	Channel 4	Cowes Week (5)	Paddy Haycocks	500027	
13 August 1990	Mon 11.00am	Channel 4	Risky Business (1)	Not recorded	502224	
14 August 1990	Tue 11.00am	Channel 4	Risky Business (2)	Not recorded	663992	
15 August 1990	Wed 11.00am	Channel 4	Risky Business (3)	Not recorded	663993	
16 August 1990	Thu 11.00am	Channel 4	Risky Business (4)	Not recorded	663994	
17 August 1990	Fri 11.00am	Channel 4	Risky Business (5)	Not recorded	663995	
20 August 1990	Mon 11.00am	Channel 4	Scotland (1)	Michael Groth	502225	
21 August 1990	Tue 11.00am	Channel 4	Scotland (2)	Michael Groth	663996	
22 August 1990	Wed 11.00am	Channel 4	Scotland (3)	Michael Groth	663997	
23 August 1990	Thu 11.00am	Channel 4	Scotland (4)	Michael Groth	502226	
24 August 1990	Fri 11.00am	Channel 4	Scotland (5)	Michael Groth	502233	
28 August 1990	Tue 11.00am	Channel 4	The Seaside (1)	Andy Kershaw	502234	
29 August 1990	Wed 11.00am	Channel 4	The Seaside (2)	Andy Kershaw	663999	
30 August 1990	Thu 11.00am	Channel 4	The Seaside (3)	Andy Kershaw	664000	
31 August 1990	Fri 11.00am	Channel 4	The Seaside (4)	Andy Kershaw	502235	
3 September 1990	Mon 11.00am	Channel 4	St George's Hospital, Tooting (1)	Victoria Studd	664002	
4 September 1990	Tue 11.00am	Channel 4	St George's Hospital, Tooting (2)	Victoria Studd	502237	
5 September 1990	Wed 11.00am	Channel 4	St George's Hospital, Tooting (3)	Victoria Studd	664004	
6 September 1990	Thu 11.00am	Channel 4	St George's Hospital, Tooting (4)	Victoria Studd	664005	
10 September 1990	Mon 11.00am	Channel 4	Untitled edition	Michael Groth	664006	
11 September 1990	Tue 11.00am	Channel 4	Untitled edition	Michael Groth	664007	
12 September 1990	Wed 11.00am	Channel 4	Untitled edition	Michael Groth	664009	
13 September 1990	Thu 11.00am	Channel 4	Untitled edition	Michael Groth	664010	
14 September 1990	Fri 11.00am	Channel 4	Untitled edition	Not recorded	502241	
10 December 1990	Mon 11.00am	Channel 4	Gulf (1)	Michael Groth	500031	
11 December 1990	Tue 11.00am	Channel 4	Gulf (2)	Michael Groth	500032	
12 December 1990	Wed 11.00am	Channel 4	Gulf (3)	Michael Groth	500033	
13 December 1990	Thu 11.00am	Channel 4	Gulf (4)	Michael Groth	500034	
14 December 1990	Fri 11.00am	Channel 4	Gulf (5)	Michael Groth	500035	
17 December 1990	Mon 11.00am	Channel 4	Israel (1)	Richard Jobson	500046	
18 December 1990	Tue 11.00am	Channel 4	Israel (2)	Richard Jobson	500049	
19 December 1990	Wed 11.00am	Channel 4	Israel (3)	Richard Jobson	502207	
20 December 1990	Thu 11.00am	Channel 4	Israel (4)	Richard Jobson	502209	
21 December 1990	Fri 11.00am	Channel 4	Israel (5)	Richard Jobson	502210	

== Late-evening series (1991–1992) ==
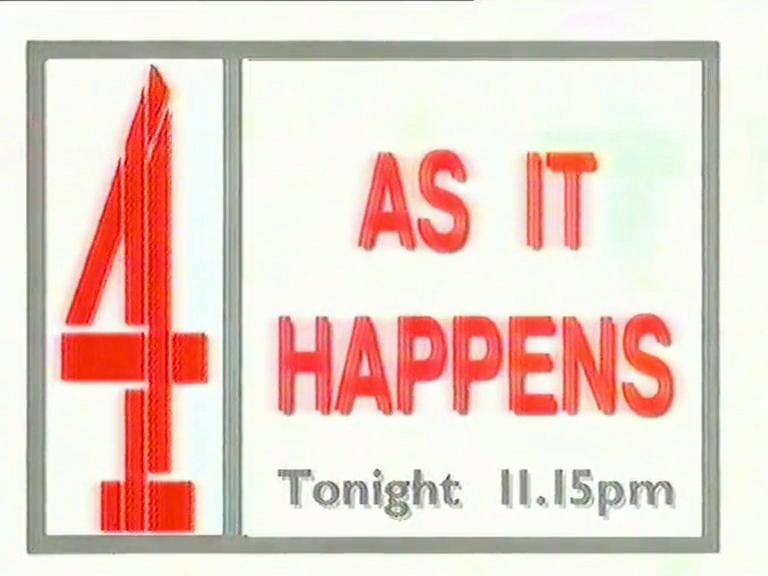
Photo of screen, 'As It Happens' TV promo for Channel 4

The programme returned on 3 August 1991 in a weekly Saturday late-evening slot, its record annotated "First in the resumed series". Nine editions ran to 28 September 1991, each self-contained and shot in a different location: Las Vegas, Kuwait, Palma de Mallorca, Brighton, Tallinn, Bandera, Texas, Tokyo, Hong Kong and Berlin. The Berlin edition is annotated "In the last of the series". Start times varied between 22:30 and 23:40. The Tokyo edition was transmitted within Channel 4's "A Night in Japan" themed evening.

Two further editions followed outside that run. On 31 December 1991, days after the dissolution of the Soviet Union, an edition reported from Red Square in Moscow on reactions to "their first year of freedom". The final edition covered the 1992 United States presidential election on 3 November 1992, with Andy Kershaw reporting from Little Rock, Arkansas, Shyama Perera from Washington, D.C. and Richard Denton from San Francisco; it continued past midnight into 4 November.

=== Editions ===
Date	Time	Network	Title	Presenter	BFI ref	TVRDb listing
3 August 1991	Sat 11.00pm	Channel 4	Las Vegas	Pete McCarthy	379591	
10 August 1991	Sat 11.15pm	Channel 4	Kuwait	Andy Kershaw	511789	
17 August 1991	Sat 11.40pm	Channel 4	Palma De Mallorca	Pete McCarthy	511823	
24 August 1991	Sat 11.00pm	Channel 4	Brighton	Andy Kershaw	511772	
31 August 1991	Sat 10.30pm	Channel 4	Tallinn, Estonia	Andy Kershaw	511829	
7 September 1991	Sat 11.05pm	Channel 4	Bandera, Texas	Andy Kershaw	511765	
14 September 1991	Sat 11.00pm	Channel 4	Japan	Pete McCarthy	511777	
21 September 1991	Sat 11.00pm	Channel 4	Hong Kong	Pete McCarthy	511774	
28 September 1991	Sat 10.30pm	Channel 4	Berlin	Andy Kershaw	511771	
31 December 1991	Tue 10.45pm	Channel 4	Moscow	Not recorded	511816	
3 November 1992	Tue 11.45pm	Channel 4	US Presidential Election	Andy Kershaw, Shyama Perera, Richard Denton	396499	

== Awards ==
In their 1992 Annual report, Channel 4 listed the 'Moscow New Year' edition as having received the award of Best Outside Broadcast

== Archive status ==
The BFI National Archive holds material for most editions, in formats including 1-inch videotape, VHS, Betacam SP, Digital Betacam and digital masters. Several editions are recorded as having no material held, including the earliest catalogued edition of 2 January 1990 and the third Israel edition of 19 December 1990. The BFI record for the streets of London block notes that "the Archive acquired 1, 3 & 5" of five editions, and that for the East of England Show block that the "Archive acquired parts 1 & 4 only"; the remaining editions were catalogued separately at a later date. The fourth Cowes Week edition of 9 August 1990 has two BFI work records, one recording held material and one recording none.

A number of editions are available to view in the BFI Southbank Mediatheque.
