= Mickey Clark =

British journalist

Mickey Clark is an English financial journalist, currently working for the London Evening Standard. Clark re-joined the Evening Standard in 1999, writing for The Times and the Daily Express in the interim period.

His first television role was as a markets commentator on Channel 4's Business Daily from its launch in September 1987. He then presented on The Channel 4 Daily until 1991. After presenting on CNBC, Sky News and London Weekend Television, he presented three series of BBC 2's Pound for Pound.

From its launch in 1994 until 2020, Clark has co-presented Wake Up to Money on BBC Radio 5 Live, formerly with Adrian Chiles, then with Andrew Verity, and later with Adam Parsons. Clark shared the co-hosting responsibility with a range of presenters.

In February 2020, Clark's contract, and that of financial analyst Louise Cooper, with the BBC were terminated. He presented what was supposed to be his last Radio 5 show on 28 February 2020, but subsequently reappeared, from 30 November 2020.
