= Andrew Verity =

John Andrew "Andy" Verity (born 8 April 1969 in Leeds) is an English financial journalist, currently working for BBC News as an economics correspondent.

After being raised in Barnet, he became a financial journalist in the mid-1990s. He formerly presented the daily BBC Radio 5 Live show Wake Up to Money with Mickey Clark, until July 2013 when he was replaced by Adam Parsons.

In June 2023, he published his first book, Rigged: The Incredible True Story of Whistleblowers Jailed after Exposing the Rotten Heart of the Financial System. It reveals the cover-up behind the Libor scandal that erupted in 2012.
