= Rob Young (broadcaster) =

British news presenter

- Born: Robert Young; United Kingdom
- Occupation: Broadcaster
- Years active: 2002–present
- Known for: Being a presenter of business programmes on radio in the United Kingdom and the United States
- Awards: Africa Business Reporting Award

Rob Young is a British presenter of Newsday on the BBC World Service and business programmes on radio in the United Kingdom and the United States. He is currently on the BBC World Service and The Today Programme in the UK, and Marketplace in the US.

== Career ==
Young has been a broadcaster since 2002. Young used to regularly present the business news on The Today Programme on BBC Radio 4 at 06.15 and 07.15 UK Time, interviewing chief executives from the UK's FTSE 100 Index and Foreign Trade Ministers. Young was commissioned by Prince Harry to produce a radio report assessing the link between mental and economic productivity, when the prince was editing Today on 27 December 2017.

On BBC World Service radio, Young presents Newsday, World Business Report and Business Matters. Young regularly presents 'Marketplace Morning Report from the BBC World Service' on Marketplace on US Public Radio, which is broadcast at 05.50 Eastern Time Zone. He is also a relief presenter of Newshour on the BBC World Service.

Young has reported around the world, covering the European debt crisis, the Arab Spring's economic roots and the rise of the economies of China and Africa. Young at one time presented BBC Radio 5 Live and its Wake Up to Money programme. Young's coverage of business matters around the world has been referenced by authors, financial experts and publications. In 2018 Young wrote a guest blog for the education project New Writing South called "how not to be a writer".
