= Darren Fletcher (broadcaster) =

English football commentator

Darren Fletcher (born 5 October 1972) is an English football commentator for TNT Sports on their coverage of the Premier League, UEFA Champions League and UEFA Europa League.

== Career ==
=== BBC (2004–2016) ===
Fletcher began broadcasting in 1993 with local radio stations in his home town Nottingham when he was aged 20. He joined BBC Radio Five Live in 2004. Whilst he was part of Five Live's main commentary team he commentated on two World Cups and a European Championship. He also regularly appeared on the show 606, often alongside Robbie Savage. In 2010 he joined BBC Sport to be part of their coverage and also commentating on Match of the Day. He was also part of the BBC team at the 2012 Summer Olympics in London. He was the main commentator covering the Boxing Tournament alongside co-commentator Steve Bunce.

=== TNT Sports (2013–present) ===
In 2013, he joined TNT Sports (formerly BT Sport) to commentate on their new coverage of the Premier League. In 2014 he co-hosted the programme Fletch and Sav, alongside ex-footballer Robbie Savage, which was launched to rival Soccer AM. The show ended in 2016 when BT Sport (now TNT Sports) acquired the rights to 5:30 pm games. Fletcher also became part of the channel's FA Cup, UEFA Champions League and UEFA Europa League team when BT acquired those rights in 2015. Since 2016 he has commentated on the finals of the Europa League and the Champions League.

Since 2014 Fletcher has anchored the Channel 4 coverage of the Red Bull Soapbox Derby.

In 2019, Fletcher and Josh Chetwynd commentated on the 2019 MLB London Series baseball games between the New York Yankees and Boston Red Sox.

=== Notts County (2017–2018) ===
In 2017, Fletcher became a director at Notts County F.C. in his home town of Nottingham, and worked closely with club owner Alan Hardy. He stepped down from the position in August 2018.
