= Dominic Laurie =

English business broadcast journalist

Dominic Laurie is a former English business broadcast journalist. He was a presenter of business news on Breakfast, BBC One's morning television news programme and BBC Radio 5 and now works in communications in the private sector.

== Early life ==
His parents moved from Northern Ireland to North London, where Dominic was born in April 1974. He grew up in Highgate, and was educated privately. He then studied French and Italian at Robinson College, Cambridge, during which time he spent a year in Rome teaching English at a secondary school.

On graduation he was recruited by United Biscuits, working as a car-based account manager selling crisps and biscuits in South Wales, Cardiff and West Wales. He was then promoted to work in marketing on a brand of diet crisps in London. In 1999 he joined British Airways's then budget airline Go Fly as brand manager, later promoted to UK Marketing manager.

== Broadcasting ==
At the age of 29, Laurie retrained as a broadcast journalist at the University of Central England in Birmingham. On graduation he joined BBC Radio Oxford as reporter, producer and newsreader. He then moved to London, working as a freelance producer on BBC Radio 5 Live, and then an overnight reporter on Sky News.

In 2006 Laurie joined the BBC business and economics unit. Between October 2007 and April 2008, he was BBC's Europe business reporter in Brussels. From January 2009 he worked as a reporter on the BBC lunchtime programme Working Lunch, which was discontinued in July 2010. He then presented business news on both the BBC News Channel and BBC Radio 4's Today programme. From 2011 he co-presented the BBC Radio 5 Live early morning business programme, Wake Up to Money.

In light of the move of BBC Radio 5 Live to MediaCityUK in Salford, Laurie went freelance from the start of 2012. In 2012, whilst still working for the BBC presenting business news, he also worked as a London-based correspondent for Voice of America, though this ended in summer 2012. In the wake of the election of Pope Francis in March 2013, the BBC temporarily deployed Laurie to Rome as a general news correspondent. He was also a main anchor for 5 live, presenting when the news of the death of Baroness Thatcher broke on 8 April 2013. He also anchored coverage of the crash of Malaysia MH370 for the station.

Laurie was one of the presenters of business news on Breakfast, BBC One's morning television news programme.

He was a winner of Celebrity Mastermind in the Christmas 2014/15 season. Shown on 11 January 2015 on BBC One he scored 20 points with his specialist subject being the London Underground.

In 2015, he presented programmes on the BBC World Service including World Business Report, Business Matters, Outside Source and Newsday. He left the BBC in October 2015, and has since had roles in communications.
