= Robbie Savage =

Welsh football manager, pundit, and former player (born 1974)

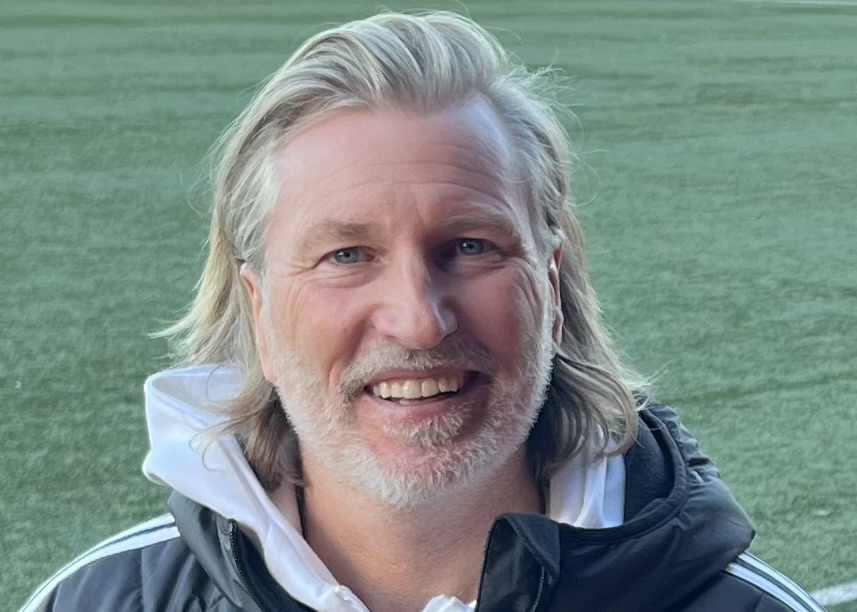
- Savage in 2024

Personal information
- Full name: Robert William Savage
- Date of birth: 18 October 1974 (age 52)
- Place of birth: Wrexham, Wales
- Height: 6 ft 1 in (1.85 m)
- Position: Midfielder

Team information
- Current team: Peterborough United (manager)

Youth career
- Brickfield Rangers
- 1990: Lex XI
- 1991–1993: Manchester United

Senior career*
Years	Team	Apps	(Gls)
1993–1994	Manchester United	0	(0)
1994–1997	Crewe Alexandra	77	(10)
1997–2002	Leicester City	172	(8)
2002–2005	Birmingham City	82	(11)
2005–2008	Blackburn Rovers	76	(1)
2008–2011	Derby County	124	(7)
2008	→ Brighton & Hove Albion (loan)	6	(0)
2019–2020	Stockport Town	1	(0)
Total		538	(37)

International career
1992	Wales U18	2	(0)
1995	Wales U21	5	(1)
1995–2004	Wales	39	(2)

Managerial career
- 2023: Macclesfield (caretaker)
- 2024–2025: Macclesfield
- 2025–2026: Forest Green Rovers
- 2026–: Peterborough United
- * Club domestic league appearances and goals

Robert William Savage (born 18 October 1974) is a Welsh professional football manager, pundit and former player who played as a midfielder. He is the manager of EFL League One club Peterborough United.

During his career he played predominantly as a midfielder, starting off as a youth player with Manchester United before joining Crewe Alexandra when released by the Old Trafford club. He became a regular for Leicester City in the late 1990s and early 2000s, and performed a similar role for Birmingham City and Blackburn Rovers. In 2008, he joined Derby County; after a short loan spell with Brighton & Hove Albion later that year, he returned to captain Derby, with whom he finished his playing career. He also played for the Wales national team on 39 occasions. He is now a pundit for the BBC and regularly presents 606 on BBC Radio 5 Live on Sunday evenings. He also co-presents Early Kick Off on TNT Sports.

== Club career ==
=== Early career ===
Born in Wrexham, Savage started his playing career with local sides Brickfield Rangers and Lex XI. When he finished school, he joined Manchester United as a trainee and originally played as a striker. He played in the FA Youth Cup winning team of 1992, and was later given a professional contract, but never played a first-team game for the club and signed for Crewe Alexandra in 1994.

He switched into midfield early in his time at Crewe and proved himself as a competent young player, helping them reach the Division Two play-offs in his first two seasons at the club; a remarkable feat for a newly promoted club who had only played at this level twice in the previous 30 years. Crewe then made it third time lucky by sealing promotion via the play-offs in 1997. It was the first time that Crewe had reached the second tier of the English football league system, but shortly after helping Crewe win promotion, Savage handed in a transfer request to manager Dario Gradi.

=== Leicester City ===
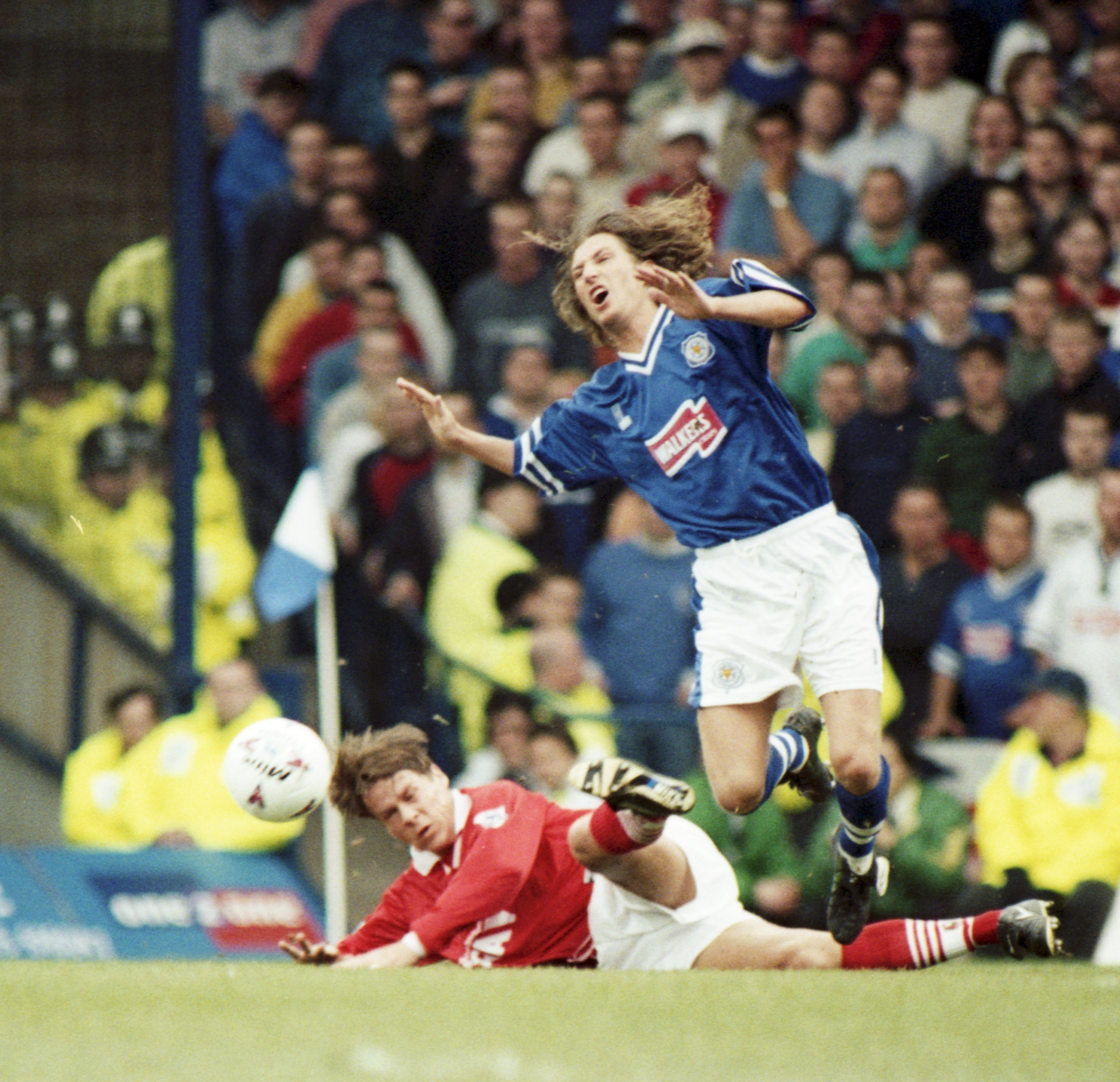
Savage playing for Leicester City in 1997–98, his first season with the club.

Savage was transferred to Premier League side Leicester City managed by Martin O'Neill, for a fee of £400,000, in July 1997. Savage spent five years at Leicester, where he made his name as a reliable, competitive and fiery midfielder. In 1999, Leicester reached the League Cup final against Tottenham Hotspur. In a controversial incident, Savage made a poor tackle on Tottenham's Justin Edinburgh who retaliated by swinging his arm out. Contact was minimal, but Savage fell to the ground. Edinburgh was sent off for raising his arms, and although Tottenham went on to win the final, many Spurs fans still hold a grudge against Savage for the incident to this day. However, a year later Leicester reached the League Cup final again, this time winning 2–1 against Tranmere Rovers.

=== Birmingham City ===
When Leicester were relegated from the Premiership at the end of the 2001–02 season he transferred to newly promoted Birmingham City for a fee of £1.25 million, signing a three-year contract. He won the club's Player of the Year award in 2003. At the beginning of January 2005 he submitted a written request for a transfer, allegedly wishing to be nearer his ailing parents in Wrexham. On 19 January, he completed a move to Blackburn Rovers for a fee of £3 million, having scored 11 goals in 82 league games for Birmingham.

=== Blackburn Rovers ===
In his first five months as a Blackburn player, Savage helped his new club to Premier League safety and reached the FA Cup Semi-final, a 3–0 loss to Arsenal in his homeland's Millennium Stadium.

In March, Savage called an end to his international career after new manager John Toshack dropped him for a World Cup 2006 qualifying game against Austria. His feud with Toshack and the Welsh FA continued long into the 2005–06 season as Savage insisted he retired from international football only because Toshack told him he was not good enough to play for Wales.

In 2005–06, Savage was a regular performer for Blackburn, making 42 appearances and scoring once, against former club Birmingham. The following season, he scored against Salzburg and Wisła Kraków in Rovers' UEFA Cup campaign, but his season was cut short by a broken leg in January, which kept him out for the rest of the season.

During the 2007–08 season, Savage endured further problems with his knee, suffering a knock in the 2–1 win at Spurs after being caught by Robbie Keane. Surgery was required which kept him out of the starting lineup for six weeks. Following the return of Steven Reid to the Rovers starting lineup and some good form by David Dunn, he found it harder to get into the starting XI. Savage was well liked by the Blackburn fans and was given a standing ovation by a near capacity ground by the Rovers fans when he returned with Derby.

It was revealed by then Sunderland manager Roy Keane in his 2014 autobiography, that he had been given permission by Blackburn to sign Savage during the end of his time at Blackburn; however, he was put off by Savage's "wazzupp" voicemail, with Keane describing his thoughts after hearing this as "I can't be fucking signing that".

=== Derby County ===
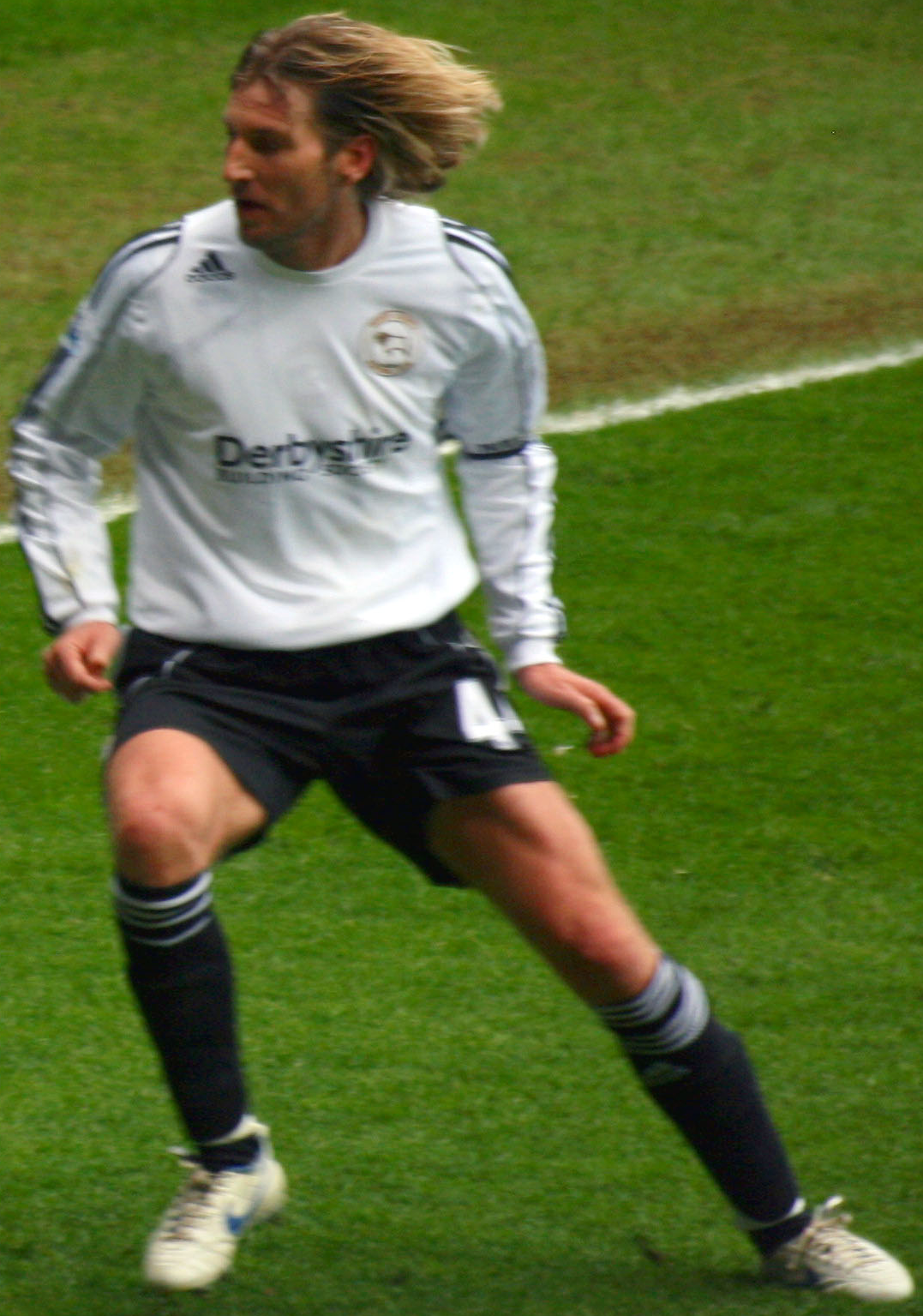
Savage playing for Derby against West Ham United in the 2007–08 season

On 9 January 2008, Savage joined Derby County for a fee of £1.5 million on a two-and-a-half-year contract, and later revealed that he had taken a pay cut to join Derby in his search for first-team football and had rejected a move to Sunderland because he felt Derby had wanted him more. As the number 8 shirt, which he had worn at previous clubs, was already allocated to then-captain Matthew Oakley, he took the number 44 shirt because the numbers add up to 8. He was appointed the new Derby captain after Oakley was sold to Leicester, and he skippered the Derby side in his first match, a 1–0 home defeat to Wigan Athletic.

Rumours of Savage leaving Derby came in July 2008 when he missed out on every pre-season match. In August, Leicester City chairman Milan Mandaric declared an interest in Savage, which was dismissed by Derby. Paul Jewell repeatedly left Savage out of the team, after Derby's poor start to the 2008–2009 season, and he was replaced as captain by Alan Stubbs. Stubbs was forced to retire shortly into the new season through injury, but Savage was not considered for the role due to not being in the first team, and the armband went to Paul Connolly.

After failing to break back into the first team, Savage was sent out on loan in October to Brighton for a month to keep match fit. He would later reveal one year later, in a build-up to a match between Leicester and Derby County, that he had tried to secure a loan deal to the Walkers Stadium (Leicester had declared an interest in him months earlier). Savage even telephoned club ambassador Alan Birchenall and former teammate Paul Dickov to put in a good word with manager Nigel Pearson. Pearson, however, "said no", despite Derby offering to pay "90 or 95 per-cent" of Savage's wages. Following Jewell's resignation as Derby manager, Savage found himself brought back into first team contention by new manager Nigel Clough, who made him first choice in central midfield. Savage scored his first goal for the club in a 2–1 loss to Doncaster Rovers on 27 February 2009.

Savage signed a one-year extension to his Derby contract with the club on 10 August 2009 to take him through to the end of the 2010–11 season. The next day, he was named in the Championship Team of the Week for his performance in the opening day victory over Peterborough United. Later that month, Savage was renamed as Captain of Derby County, replacing Paul Connolly, who manager Nigel Clough wanted to "concentrate on his own game". In response, Savage said that: "I did not deserve the captaincy when I first came to the club. I was handed it from the first day and I shouldn't have been. It was too much pressure for me and I had a nightmare. I let it get to me. I think I'm ready for it now. I feel more comfortable with it now." Derby struggled once again during the season, not achieving safety until the 44th fixture, but the season was a personal success for Savage as he appeared in all but one of Derby's 51 league and cup fixtures during the campaign, the match which he missed being due to suspension, starting 49 of them. He also scored twice; a free kick against Queens Park Rangers in a 4–2 home defeat and a volley at Sheffield United in a 1–1 draw. He also won the club's own Player of the Year award but lost out on the fan's award to Shaun Barker.

Savage again started in the Derby first XI in the 2010–11 season in a new 4–2–3–1 formation around new signing James Bailey, though Derby got off to a poor start winning just one of their opening seven league games, with Savage's form making fans question the justification for his place in the team and his status as skipper. He made his 100th appearance for the club in a 2–2 draw against Queens Park Rangers before he was dropped to the bench for a 1–1 draw at Barnsley, the first game he had played no part in for Derby (barring unavailability for selection) since Nigel Clough's arrival as manager in January 2009.

Savage played in goal for Derby on 11 March 2010, when Stephen Bywater was taken off with a back injury against Reading. He let in two goals during his 45 minutes in the Derby goal.

On 16 October 2010, Savage played his 600th career match in a 3–0 victory on Preston North End, scoring an injury-time penalty to seal the win. In January 2011, Savage revealed that he was considering leaving the club for a move to Vancouver Whitecaps, Savage stating: "One thing is for sure, I will be leaving Derby County at the end of the season, if not before, even if they offer me a new contract. My time is up here. I've thoroughly enjoyed my time with Derby and I want to walk away with my head held high". One fan responded by telephoning Savage during an interview on BBC Radio 5 Live and telling him to "leave the club now" and "take young Mr. Clough with him". Savage eventually rejected the move, stating it was too big a move for his family. On 31 January 2011, Savage announced that he would be retiring at the end of the season to concentrate on his growing media career. In his last two games, a home loss against Bristol City and an away defeat at Reading, he was met with a round of applause and a standing ovation from both sets of supporters.

=== Stockport Town ===
On 24 November 2019, Savage came out of retirement to join Stockport Town of the North West Counties League. He made his league debut for the club the following evening, as an 80th-minute substitute in a 3–2 victory over FC Oswestry Town. That was his only appearance.

== International career ==
Savage played at under-18 and under-21 level for Wales before making his senior international debut in 1995 against Albania while at Crewe. Savage attained 39 caps, scoring two goals, both in World Cup qualifying against Turkey and Norway, before retiring from international football in September 2005, saying he wished to concentrate on his club career. However, many people believe the reason he quit was due to a spat with Wales manager John Toshack. Savage did give the explanation that "John Toshack said it was my way or the highway – well I'm on the M56."

On 6 March 2006, he appeared on Welsh radio, partaking in a debate with pundit Leighton James over his exclusion from the Wales squad. Early in his international career he clashed with former Wales manager Bobby Gould when he jokingly threw a replica of Paolo Maldini's shirt into a disposal bin before a match against Italy. Savage was initially dropped by Gould from the squad only to be reinstated the next day.

== Style of play and controversies ==
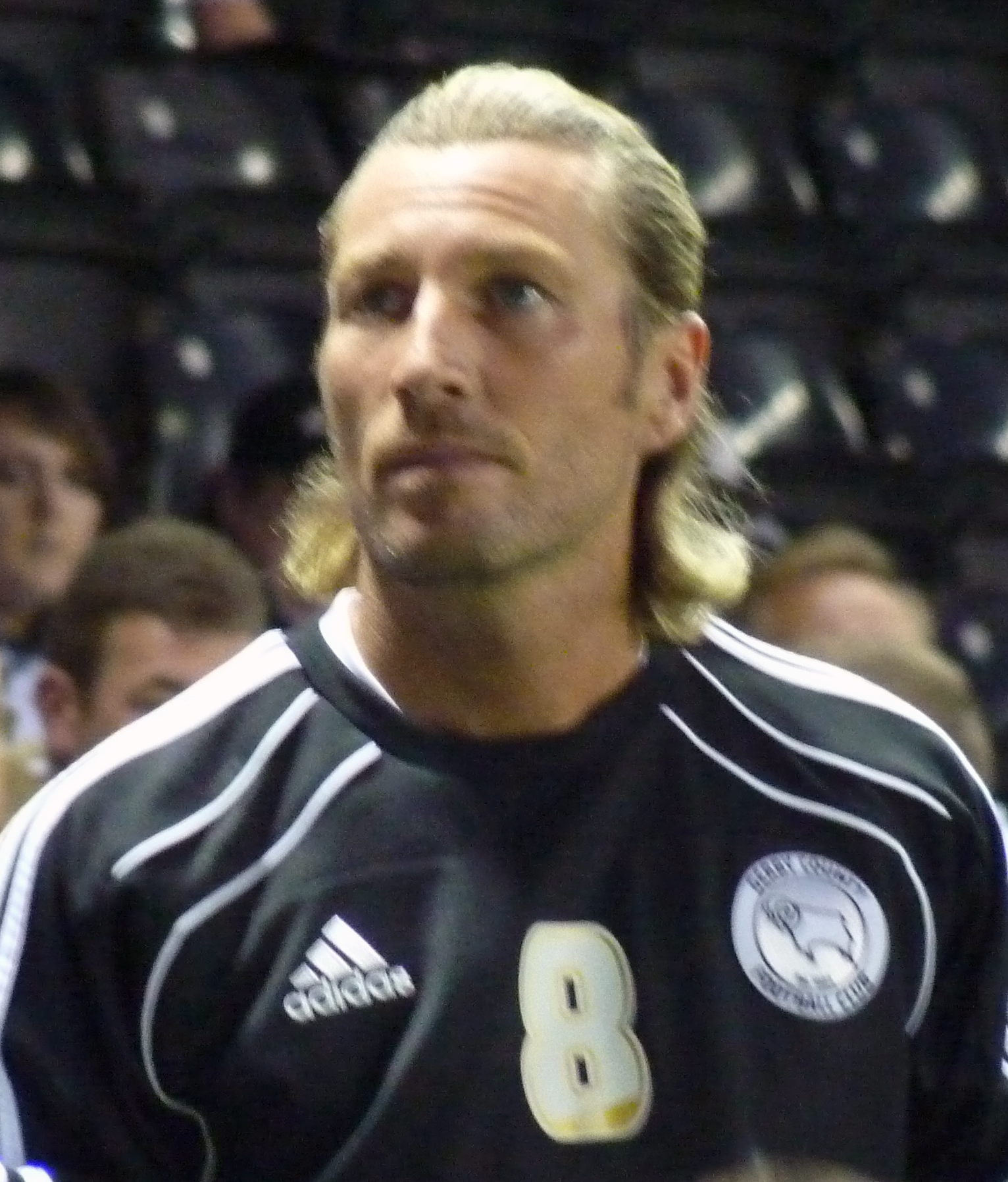
Savage with Derby County in 2010

Savage's style as a midfield player was all-action and energetic, and he regularly collected yellow cards, and for a while held the dubious distinction of being awarded the most yellow cards of any Premiership player in the league's history – 89, although he has now been overtaken by Lee Bowyer, Kevin Davies, Paul Scholes, Scott Parker, Wayne Rooney and Gareth Barry. Fans of Aston Villa, Tottenham Hotspur, West Ham United and Arsenal have accused him of simulation, whether to win a set piece or to get an opponent red carded.

During a match against Newcastle United in August 2003, the referee Matt Messias swung his arm out and accidentally hit Savage in the face as Savage was running behind him. On 17 January 2010, whilst commentating for BBC Radio 5 Live's coverage of a Premier League match between Aston Villa and West Ham United at Villa Park, a clearance by Villa midfielder Stiliyan Petrov hit Savage in the face causing some minor bleeding to the nose.

Savage was, however, only sent off twice in his career: once during an international game for the Welsh national team, and once during a Premier League game for Blackburn. He received his first-ever red card when he was sent off in Wales' World Cup qualification match against Northern Ireland in September 2004 for reacting to a foul on him by midfielder Michael Hughes. Both Hughes and Savage were sent off, but, on later review, the punishment of Savage seemed harsh to some. Savage was ridiculed for threatening to appeal to the European Court of Human Rights over the decision. His once-impressive statistic of never being sent off in a Premiership match ended on 18 March 2006 when he was dismissed against Middlesbrough for two bookable offences. Both were controversial – the first for a challenge on George Boateng where he appeared to take the ball, and the second for handball when it seemed unintentional. Savage later admitted that he was probably due a controversial sending off because he had escaped punishment for illegal challenges in the past.

One famous example of his eccentric behaviour was while he played for Leicester City. In an incident to become known as "Poogate" he used the referee's toilet before a game, claiming he had an upset stomach due to the effects of prescribed antibiotics. He lost his appeal against The Football Association's decision to fine him £10,000, and Leicester fined him two weeks' wages for the incident.

Whilst playing for Leicester, in the final minute of a league game against rivals Derby at Pride Park in 2001, Savage dived in the penalty area. Leicester were awarded the penalty, which was converted, and meant they won the game 3–2. Savage's blatant dive, his hopeful look at the referee and his aggressive fist-pumping celebration in front of the home fans resulted in a torrent of abuse from the fans and in Savage being chased across the pitch by incensed Derby players, two of whom were booked. Derby fans regularly booed, jeered and abused Savage whenever he played against them, and when he became a Derby player in January 2008, he was treated with a mixture of hostility and indifference, partly over the incident, and partly over his average form.

Savage was also involved in an incident at Villa Park, while playing for Birmingham City, in a bad-tempered Second City derby in March 2003. After a slide tackle on him by Dion Dublin, a confrontation between the two and several other players occurred before Dublin headbutted Savage. Dublin was then sent off by referee Mark Halsey as result. Birmingham would go on to win the derby 0–2.

When being interviewed by BBC Radio Derby's Colin Gibson in January 2010, Savage reacted furiously to rumours he had heard that the Derby players thought the club's backroom staff were not up to the job; these rumours had been brought up during a phone-in on Gibson's show on the station the preceding weekend, following the Rams' 4–1 defeat at home to Scunthorpe United on 9 January.

== Media career ==
Savage occasionally acted as a pundit during his club career, and started working in the media more regularly in the 2009–10 season. He worked in a number of different punditry roles during the 2010 FIFA World Cup before joining the presenting team for BBC Radio 5 Live's 6-0-6 show. In September 2010, Savage signed up as official sporting ambassador for bookmakers William Hill. In May 2011 he was awarded the Sony Radio Academy Rising Star Award, as well as winning an award from the Plain English Campaign.

Between 2009 and 2013, Savage was a pundit on ESPN, and has since moved to TNT Sports.

Since retiring from football in May 2011, Savage has attempted to become a more prominent broadcasting figure beyond punditry. From September 2011 Savage took part in the 2011 series of Strictly Come Dancing, partnering Ola Jordan. The show broadcast on 22 October saw Savage perform a dramatic knee-slide towards the camera, which resulted in a broken nose. Savage and Jordan were eliminated from the competition in the quarterfinal on 4 December 2011, placing sixth.

In October 2012, along with 463 other players, Savage took part in BBC Radio 5 Live's attempt to set a new Guinness World Record for the 'most players in a continuous 5 a side exhibition match'. This was for BBC Children in Need along with comedian Lloyd Langford and BBC Radio 5 Live travel reporter Lindsey Chapman. Along with Ex-England cricketer Andrew Flintoff, Savage is part of a BBC Radio 5 Live podcast called Flintoff, Savage & The Ping Pong Guy, hosted by former table tennis player Matthew Syed, which discussed current sporting topics.

== Managerial career ==
=== Macclesfield ===
Savage's involvement with Stockport Town led to him becoming involved with the creation of phoenix club Macclesfield F.C. in October 2020. Macclesfield owner Robert Smethurst appointed Savage as a member of the board (later director of football) with Danny Whitaker as manager. On 30 August 2021, Macclesfield defeated local rivals Congleton Town 1–0 in the NWCFL Premier Division; the match was suspended for several minutes late in the second half due to crowd trouble, during which Savage intervened to break up fighting.

On 17 June 2024, Robbie Savage was appointed head coach at Macclesfield.

Under his leadership, the club secured promotion to the National League North on 22 March 2025 after defeating Bamber Bridge, becoming champions of the Northern Premier League Premier Division.

=== Forest Green Rovers ===
On 1 July 2025, Savage was appointed manager of National League side Forest Green Rovers.

=== Peterborough United ===
On 2 October 2026, Savage was confirmed as the new Peterborough manager, signing a "long-term" contract.

== Personal life ==
Savage was born in Wrexham on 18 October 1974, to Colin and Valerie Savage. He attended Ysgol Bryn Alyn in Gwersyllt until he completed his GCSE studies in July 1991. On leaving school, Savage joined Manchester United as an apprentice.

Savage and his wife Sarah have two sons. In 2012 one of his sons, Charlie, was attached to Manchester United's youth academy and in April 2021 he signed his first professional contract with the club. On 8 December 2021, Savage provided commentary for BT Sport in the match where his son Charlie made his senior Manchester United debut in the UEFA Champions League, coming on as a late substitute in a 1–1 draw against Young Boys.

Robbie Savage's father was diagnosed with Pick's disease, a dementia-type illness, when he was in his mid-50s, and died in 2012. Savage is an ambassador for the dementia care and research charity, the Alzheimer's Society.

Savage had said in the future he would have liked to finish his career at home town club Wrexham before going on to manage them. He also said that the greatest regret of his football career was not signing for Everton when he had the chance in 2005.

Savage published a biography in 2011, Savage!, written with Janine Self, and in 2015 published I'll Tell You What..., a book of memoir and punditry.

In October 2014, Savage was awarded an honorary fellowship at Wrexham's Glyndŵr University for services to sport.

== Career statistics ==
=== Club ===
Club	Season	League			FA Cup		League Cup		Europe		Total	
Club	Season	Division	Apps	Goals	Apps	Goals	Apps	Goals	Apps	Goals	Apps	Goals
Crewe Alexandra	1994–95	Second Division	6	2	–		–		–		6	2
Crewe Alexandra	1995–96	Second Division	30	7	3	0	3	0	–		36	7
Crewe Alexandra	1996–97	Second Division	41	1	2	0	2	0	–		45	1
Crewe Alexandra	Total		77	10	5	0	5	0	–		87	10
Leicester City	1997–98	Premier League	35	2	2	1	1	0	1 (Note: Appearances in UEFA Cup)	0	39	3
Leicester City	1998–99	Premier League	34	1	–		7	0	–		41	1
Leicester City	1999–2000	Premier League	35	1	5	0	7	0	–		47	1
Leicester City	2000–01	Premier League	33	4	4	0	–		2	0	39	4
Leicester City	2001–02	Premier League	35	0	1	0	2	0	–		38	0
Leicester City	Total		172	8	12	1	17	0	3	0	204	9
Birmingham City	2002–03	Premier League	33	4	1	0	–		–		34	4
Birmingham City	2003–04	Premier League	31	3	4	0	–		–		35	3
Birmingham City	2004–05	Premier League	18	4	–		1	1	–		19	5
Birmingham City	Total		82	11	5	0	1	1	–		88	12
Blackburn Rovers	2004–05	Premier League	9	0	4	0	–		–		13	0
Blackburn Rovers	2005–06	Premier League	34	1	2	0	6	0	–		42	1
Blackburn Rovers	2006–07	Premier League	21	0	–		–		6	2	27	2
Blackburn Rovers	2007–08	Premier League	12	0	–		1	0	5	0	18	0
Blackburn Rovers	Total		76	1	6	0	7	0	11	2	100	3
Derby County	2007–08	Premier League	16	0	1	0	–		–		17	0
Derby County	2008–09	Championship	22	1	3	0	3	0	–		28	1
Derby County	2009–10	Championship	46	2	3	0	1	0	–		50	2
Derby County	2010–11	Championship	40	4	1	0	1	0	–		42	4
Derby County	Total		124	7	8	0	5	0	–		137	7
Brighton & Hove Albion (loan)	2008–09	League One	6	0	–		–		–		6	0
Career total			537	37	36	1	35	1	14	2	623 (Note: These statistics do not include 9 appearances and 1 goal scored in other competitions with Crewe (8 appearances, 1 goal) and one appearance with Brighton and Hove Albion)	41

=== International ===
Appearances and goals by national team and year

National team	Year	Apps	Goals
Wales	1995	1	0
Wales	1996	2	0
Wales	1997	4	1
Wales	1998	5	0
Wales	1999	2	0
Wales	2000	5	0
Wales	2001	3	1
Wales	2002	5	0
Wales	2003	6	0
Wales	2004	6	0
Wales	Total	39	2

International goals

Scores and results list Wales's goal tally first. Score column lists score after each Savage goal.

No.	Date	Venue	Opponent	Score	Result	Competition	Ref.
1	20 August 1997	Ali Sami Yen Stadium, Istanbul, Turkey	Turkey	2–2	4–6	1998 FIFA World Cup qualification	
2	5 September 2001	Ullevaal Stadion, Oslo, Norway	Norway	1–0	2–3	2002 FIFA World Cup qualification	

== Managerial statistics ==
As of match played 21 November 2026

Managerial record by team and tenure
Team	From	To	Record					Ref.
Team	From	To	P	W	D	L	Win %	Ref.
Macclesfield (interim)	25 October 2023	31 October 2023	2	2	0	0	100.0	
Macclesfield	17 June 2024	1 July 2025	51	40	6	5	78.4	
Forest Green Rovers	1 July 2025	2 October 2026	67	32	16	19	47.8	
Peterborough United	2 October 2026	Present	10	3	2	5	30.0	
Total			130	77	24	29	59.2	

== Honours ==
=== Player ===
Manchester United Youth

- FA Youth Cup: 1991–92

Leicester City

- Football League Cup: 1999–2000; runner-up: 1998–99

=== Manager ===
Macclesfield FC

- NPL Premier Division: 2024–25

Scholastic

Chancellor, visitor, governor, rector and fellowships

Location	Date	School	Position
Wales	29 October 2014–present	Wrexham Glyndŵr University	Honorary Fellow
