= 606 (radio show) =

- Genre: Phone-in
- Running time: 90 minutes
- Country of origin: United Kingdom
- Language: English
- Home station: BBC Radio 5 (1991–1994); BBC Radio 5 Live (1994–present)
- Hosted by: Chris Sutton Robbie Savage Aaron Paul
- Recording studio: Media City UK, Salford / BBC New Broadcasting House, London
- Original release: 1991 – Present
- Audio format: MW, Digital radio, Digital TV and online
- Opening theme: "Psycho" by Muse
- Website: Official Website
- Podcast: Official Podcast

606 (pronounced six-oh-six) is a weekend early evening football phone-in programme, broadcast on BBC Radio 5 Live throughout the British football season. It covers topics relating to the current affairs of football in the United Kingdom.

The programme got its name from the approximate time the show started on a Saturday evening – six minutes past six – following Sports Report.

Since the start of the 2022–23 season, the programme is broadcast between 19:30 and 21:00 on Saturdays, and 18:30 and 20:00 on Sundays, and has been produced by Shooting Shark Productions Limited since 2015: it was formerly made by Campbell Davison Media from 2003, then Somethin' Else Productions from 2009. As well as listeners phoning in, a selection of texts and e-mails to the studio are read out.

The programme was inspired by long-running BBC Local Radio football phone-ins, such as the BBC Radio Sheffield programme Praise or Grumble.

606's current theme tune is an arrangement of "Psycho" from Muse.

== History ==
The original host was Danny Baker in the 1991–1992 season. Baker also hosted the show in the 1996–97 and 2008–09 seasons. David Mellor then presented 606 from 1992–2001 and was for a long time the regular Wednesday evening presenter. Other previous hosts have included:

- Richard Littlejohn (1997–2002)
- Adrian Chiles (2001–2006)
- Jonathan Pearce (2002–2003)
- Tim Lovejoy (2007–2009)
- DJ Spoony and Gabriele Marcotti (2007–09)
- Alan Green (2000–2013)
- Mark Chapman (2009, 2010–2013)
- Darren Fletcher (2010–2016)
- Kelly Cates (2013–2018)
- Jason Mohammad (2016–2019)
- Alistair Bruce-Ball (2018–2020)
- Sam Quek (2019–2020)
- Emma Jones (2019–2020)
- Robbie Savage (2010–present)
- Chris Sutton (2018–present)
- Aaron Paul (2025–present)
- Natalie Pike (2025–present)

Danny Baker returned to 606 to present six Euro 2008 specials and proved such a big hit with the listeners that he was invited back to present regularly on Tuesdays.

Under Baker in the 1990s the show favoured bizarre and obscure but amusing topics, often avoiding the matches played and headline football news. On occasions other sports would be included. It also included music in its first years. However, from Mellor onwards, the show became established as a more mainstream phone-in, mainly focusing on Premier League teams.

Between 2007 and 2009 the programme was hosted by DJ Spoony and Gabriele Marcotti. From the 2009–2010 season Alan Green presented on Saturdays, as he typically commentated on an evening match before presenting the Saturday show. Tim Lovejoy joined to present on Wednesdays while Danny Baker continued to present on Tuesdays from 10–11pm.

After talkSPORT took the rights to Saturday evening Premier League matches from the 2010–11 season, the Saturday edition returned again to 6:06pm. The hosts became Mark Chapman and Robbie Savage, in his final season as a professional footballer. Savage won the Rising Star in Radio Sony Radio Award for his plain speaking. Sunday's show was hosted by Alan Green. The Tuesday and Wednesday shows were dropped, only appearing on international nights.

In 2011–12, as Savage was taking part in Strictly Come Dancing, he was replaced on Saturdays by Jason Roberts. Savage instead joined Green on Sunday. In 2012–13, Savage returned to the Saturday evening program, alongside either Darren Fletcher or Mark Chapman. Green again hosts Sunday on his own.

From the 2013–14 season, there were two teams hosting between the two nights. Darren Fletcher and Robbie Savage hosted on Saturdays while Kelly Cates and former footballer Ian Wright hosted on Sundays.

From the 2016–17 season, the Saturday team changed, with Jason Mohammad joining Savage, due to Fletcher's BT Sport commentary commitments. Cates and Wright continued to host on a Sunday.

From the 2018–19 season, the Saturday show was hosted by Jason Mohammad with Robbie Savage and the Sunday show saw Alistair Bruce-Ball and Chris Sutton take over from Cates and Wright.

From the 2019–20 season, Alistair Bruce-Ball and Chris Sutton moved to the Saturday evening show with Sam Quek and Emma Jones alternating each week to present the Sunday evening show alongside Robbie Savage.

From the 2020–2021 season, Robbie Savage transitioned to the presenter role for both the Saturday and Sunday shows, alongside Chris Sutton.

From the 2025–2026 season, Robbie Savage’s football management commitments meant he had to step aside from the Saturday show. Aaron Paul replaced Savage, with Natalie Pike often standing in.

After the BBC won the right to broadcast the Saturday 17:30 Premier League match from the start of the 2022–23 season, 606's start time was moved back to 19:30.

== Programme features ==
The 2009–10 season saw the launch of the 606 Soapbox outside grounds. Fans can drop into the Soapbox and speak live to presenters Spoony and Gabriele Marcotti in the 5 Live studios. Every three weeks the Soapbox visits a league football ground in various locations around the country.

Sunday's 606 also has a weekly celebrity fan, reporting on the game they have been to that day. Celebrity fans so far have included Ray Winstone (West Ham United), Alan Davies (Arsenal), Beverley Knight (Wolves), Norman Jay (Spurs), Trevor Nelson (Chelsea), Tony Jeffries (Sunderland) and James and Oliver Phelps aka Fred and George Weasley from the Harry Potter films (Birmingham City and Aston Villa).

When Alistair Bruce-Ball and Chris Sutton started presenting, they introduced a game called "Sutton Death" in which both take it in turns to give answers to a certain category each week, in a given a time (usually around 15–20 seconds). Other features on their show included, "ABB" in which both Bruce-Ball and Sutton share what has "Amused", "Bugged" and "Baffled" them during the week, and, "The Simulation Game" in which they play a clip of the song "Free Fallin'" by Tom Petty and also play the commentary from the times during the week when players have been caught diving.

Since Robbie Savage took over as presenter, features include "six times six", giving six callers, six seconds to state their name, the team they support and their point, as well as "Gone in 60 Suttons".

== 606 online forum ==
In addition to the phone-in programme, there was also an online version of 606 in the form of an internet message board, although in June 2006 the site was forced to temporarily close due to the large amount of web traffic and forum threads. Football, cricket, rugby union, rugby league, snooker, motorsport and several other sports had message boards embedded into 606.

On 24 January 2011, it was announced the 606 forum would close at the end of the 2010–11 football season, due to cuts in the BBC's online budget of 25% . The forum finally closed on 31 May 2011.

606 also has an active Facebook group, for fans to chat, and view behind the scenes pictures of the show. Listeners can follow 606 @bbc606 on Twitter.

== Spin-offs ==
Other sports occasionally get the 606 treatment. These include Tennis, where the show became 6 Love 6 presented by John McEnroe, Cricket's 6-Duck-6 presented by former England captain Michael Vaughan and Formula 1's Slicks–0–6, which Murray Walker presented.
