= The Channel Four Daily =

Television series

- Genre: Breakfast television
- Starring: See list of presenters
- Country of origin: United Kingdom
- Original language: English

Production
- Running time: 3 hrs, 25 mins (1989–90); 2 hrs, 55 mins (1990–92)
- Production companies: Independent Television News and Various

Original release
- Network: Channel 4
- Release: 3 April 1989 – 25 September 1992

The Channel Four Daily (or Channel 4 Daily) is a breakfast television news magazine, which was produced by Independent Television News, in collaboration with other independent production companies for Channel 4. The programme was Channel 4's first breakfast programme, broadcasting between 6 am (6.30 am from April 1990) and 9.25 am each weekday morning, although weekend editions were broadcast during the Gulf War. The first edition of the programme was broadcast on 3 April 1989, with the last edition being broadcast on 25 September 1992.

The Channel Four Daily failed to gain enough viewers and was replaced with The Big Breakfast from Monday, 28 September 1992.

== Format ==
Conceived as a television newspaper, the content was a mix of short news bulletins and pre-recorded non-news segments for breakfast television. The flagship bulletin World News was co-presented from three continents. Also, a number of bite-sized feature segments (some live, others pre-recorded) lasting between 5 and 10 minutes were slotted around the news output and were shown several times each day. These included a business programme (Business Daily, which had been on air as a lunchtime programme since September 1987), sporting discussion (Kickback), consumer reports (Streetwise), arts and entertainment (Box Office), Countdown Masters – an abbreviated version of Countdown – and a cartoon slot called Comic Book.

Changes were made in April 1990, which saw all the main segments being broadcast live and from the same studio, as opposed to all non-news segments being either pre-recorded or broadcast remotely. Streetwise was cancelled, an International Sports Report replaced Kickback, Box Office transferred from a pre-recorded insert into a live segment and the flagship world news bulletin was moved to the top of the hour. The programme's length was reduced with the start time being 6.30 am rather than 6 am – The Art of Landscape and an edition of Business Daily filled the vacated 30-minute slot.

Channel 4 was unable to compete in the timeslot, with 200,000 viewers in January 1992 compared to 2.4 million for TV-am and 1.3 million for BBC, so the decision was taken to close the programme and relaunch its breakfast output with a very different programme and in September 1992 the network began airing the much more successful The Big Breakfast.

== Notable Presenters ==
London presenters

- Carol Barnes (1989–1991)
- Dermot Murnaghan (1991–1992)
- Caroline Righton (1991–1992)

Washington presenter

- Michael Nicholson

Tokyo presenters

- James Mates
- Sonia Ruseler

Other presenters

- David Bobin – International Sports Report
- Mickey Clark
- Damian Green – Business Daily
- Debbie Greenwood and Paddy Haycocks – Streetwise
- Dermot Murnaghan – Business Daily (1989–1991)
- Kim Newman – Box Office, providing movie reviews
- Nicholas Owen – relief presenter
- Simon Reed – International Sports Report
- Carol Vorderman and Richard Whiteley – Countdown Masters

== Bibliography ==
- Ian Jones, Morning Glory: A history of British breakfast television, Kelly, 2004 ISBN 1-903053-20-X
