= Business Daily (TV programme) =

- Starring: Various
- Country of origin: United Kingdom
- Original language: English

Production
- Running time: 30 minutes
- Production company: Business Television

Original release
- Network: Channel 4
- Release: 21 September 1987 – 25 September 1992

Business Daily is a British weekday financial news programme, shown on Channel 4 between 1987 and 1992.

The programme was produced by Business Television Limited. Business Television became majority-owned by Broadcast Communications in 1988. Broadcast Communications then became a subsidiary of the Guardian and Manchester Evening News Group in 1989.

== History ==
The programme launched on 21 September 1987 as part of Channel 4's 1987 expansion of weekday broadcast hours, following the transfer of ITV Schools programmes from ITV. The 30-minute programme was broadcast on weekday lunchtimes, initially at 12 noon before transferring to 12.30 pm on 28 March 1988, where it would remain until the programme ended. Business Daily was also broadcast on S4C, initially live but, after a brief period in autumn 1988 when S4C did not broadcast the programme, S4C showed it with a one-hour time delay.

In April 1989, the programme became part of Channel 4's new breakfast programme The Channel Four Daily. Four bite-size editions were broadcast, lasting from 6 to 8 minutes.

In 1990, The Channel Four Daily's broadcast hours were reduced slightly and the first breakfast edition of Business Daily became a programme in its own right, broadcasting for 8 minutes at 6.20 am, prior to the start of The Channel Four Daily.

The lunchtime programme ended on 26 June 1992, but the breakfast editions continued until the end of The Channel Four Daily on 25 September 1992.

== Presenters and reporters ==
The programme had two main presenters during its time on air: Susannah Simons and Damian Green. The main presenter would present on Mondays to Thursdays with one of the programme's reporters hosting the Friday edition. Dermot Murnaghan was the first presenter of the breakfast programmes, prior to him becoming one of the main presenters of The Channel 4 Daily.

The programme had its own team of reporters and contributors, including Mickey Clark, who would join the presenter in the studio to provide viewers with commentary on the day's market action.

== The Business Programme ==
A spin-off Sunday teatime programme was shown during the early days of the programme's time on air. It was a 45-minute programme which aired between 5.15pm and 6pm.
