= Money Box (radio programme) =

British personal finance radio programme

- Genre: Talk radio
- Running time: 30 minutes
- Country of origin: United Kingdom
- Language(s): English
- Home station: BBC Radio 4
- Hosted by: Paul Lewis
- Produced by: BBC News
- Original release: October 1977
- Website: Official website

Money Box is a weekly personal finance radio programme on BBC Radio 4, produced by BBC News, currently presented by Paul Lewis. The programme is broadcast live each Saturday in the half-hour slot just after midday. It is repeated on Sunday evenings just after 9.00pm.

== Overview ==
Money Box began in October 1977 with Louise Botting as presenter, which she continued until 1992, after which Alison Mitchell presented until September 2000. The current presenter is Paul Lewis. He has presented since September 2000, having been a reporter on the programme in the early 1990s. The programme has also been hosted by Naga Munchetty.

A related phone in programme Money Box Live launched in 1990. It answers listeners' calls and emails on one personal finance topics. Money Box Live is broadcast on Wednesdays in the half-hour slot just after 3.00pm. Vincent Duggleby sometimes presents.

Money Box and Money Box Live are broadcast each week throughout the year except for six weeks from mid-July to late August. A podcast can be downloaded and transcripts and summaries of programmes back to 2000 are available. On the website there is a 'Have Your Say' page which publishes listeners' views on one story from the current week's Money Box.

== Typical financial topics ==
- Credit cards
- Pensions
- Individual Savings Account (ISA)

== See also ==
- You and Yours, also on Radio 4, also includes much about personal finance, fraud and scams.
- Working Lunch, daily on BBC2 until July 2010
- In Business, also on Radio 4 with company focus
- Wake Up To Money, daily on BBC Radio 5 Live (also presented by Paul Lewis in the 1990s) with company focus
