= Louise Cooper (financial analyst) =

British chartered financial analyst and journalist

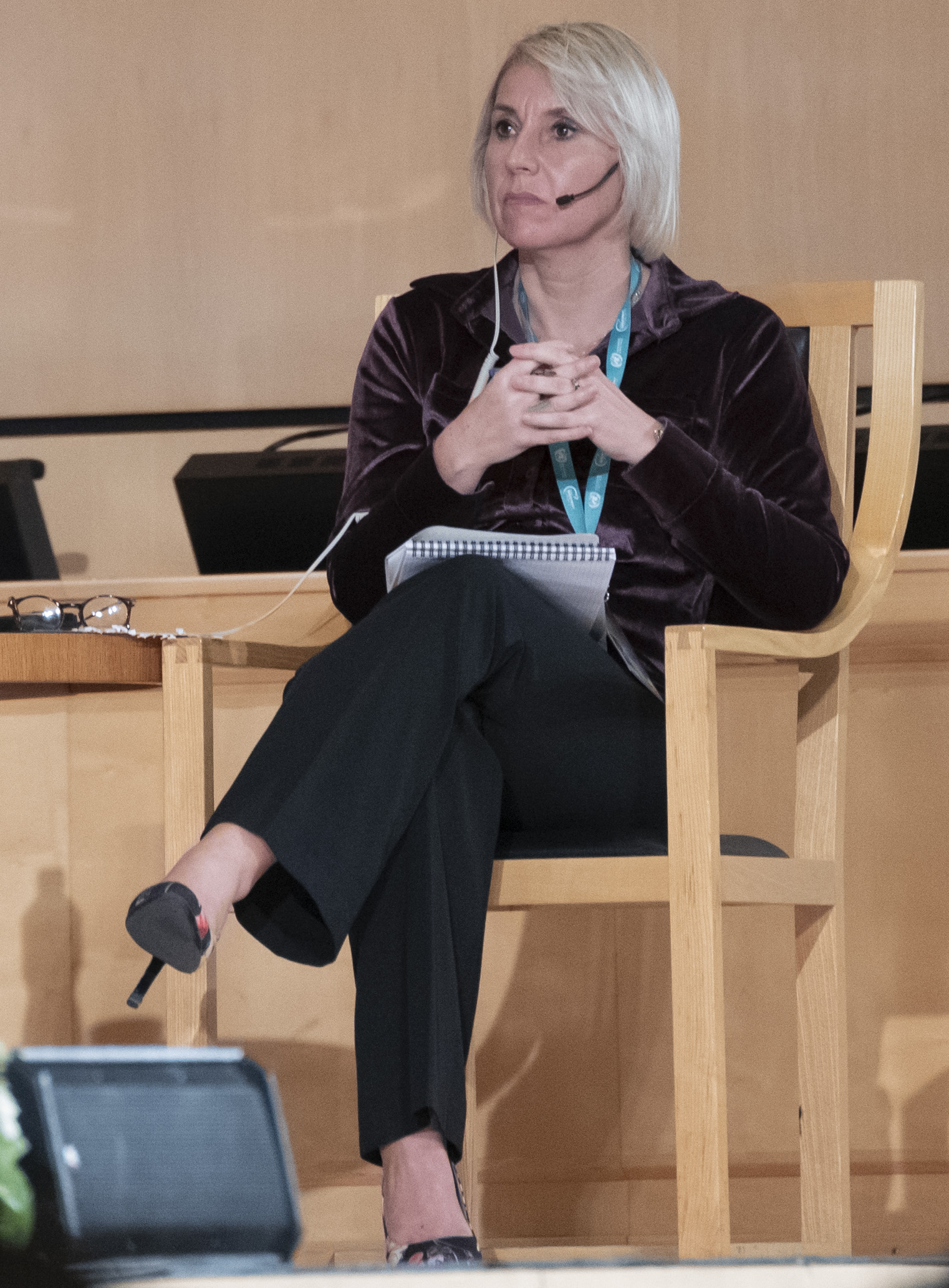
Cooper in 2018

Louise Cooper is a British Chartered Financial Analyst, journalist, and Times columnist, known for her work on the BBC World Service between 2002 and 2011 as a presenter and senior economics journalist for shows including Newshour and Europe Today. She writes a regular column for the newspaper The Times and publishes the financial blog CooperCity.

She came to the attention of the public in 2011 while working for BGC Partners as a Senior Financial Analyst, appearing from their offices to provide opinion and economic insight on TV for major broadcasters such as BBC News, ITV News, Al-Jazeera, Sky News and CNBC among others. She garnered praise for her no-nonsense style and the ability to break down complex business stories for a wider audience. Cooper is often quoted in the media, commenting on complex financial issues such as billion dollar corporate mergers, gender equality in pay and the impact of finance on football.

She has been, from time to time, a regular guest on BBC Radio 5 Live’s early morning financial programme Wake Up to Money.

== Life and career ==
Cooper attended the Cass Business School graduating with first class honours in Business and Finance in 1992. From there she moved to Goldman Sachs working in UK Equity Institutional Research Sales. In 1999 she moved to The Money Channel, working as a presenter until 2001. In June 2002 she joined the BBC World Service Radio station as a Senior Business Journalist, she remained there until 2011 when she joined Lansons Communication as the Head of Lansons Live.

In June 2011 Cooper moved to BGC Partners as a Senior Financial Analyst, where she came to prominence on British Television, providing financial analysis from the BGC offices. Cooper featured on BBC News, Sky News, ITV, CNBC and Al Jazeera. She has also made appearances on The Daily Politics where she described then UKIP leader Nigel Farage as 'laughable' for his comments denying discrimination against women working in London's financial sector. She has also appeared on ITV's Daybreak as well as Question Time and This Week.

After leaving BGC Partners in November 2012, Cooper published her blog CooperCity and has written articles for a number of newspapers and websites, including The Guardian, CNN, The Spectator and City A.M.. She also writes a regular column for The Times and works as a keynote speaker and host.
