= Paddy Haycocks =

Paddy Haycocks is a broadcaster and producer who has worked in the British media for over 25 years. Born in Portsmouth, Hampshire, on 9 April 1950 his first brush with fame came when he was appearing on the Streetwise section of the ill-fated Channel Four Daily. Haycocks regularly interviewed a lawyer who represented Ronnie Kray. The sartorially traditional Kray disapproved of Haycock's open-necked presenting style and sent him a beautiful silk tie, which Haycocks naturally wore at the first opportunity. He then went on to co-present South Today.

He is perhaps best remembered for a low-budget daytime show called As It Happens where he was beamed live from a famous place waiting for something to unfold, a style many critics feel has been adopted by modern news channels. Haycocks himself was a pioneering presenter of Channel One, London's first digital news channel but from the late 1990s worked increasingly on the other side of the camera and was, until his resignation in February 2006, factual programming executive at Talkback Thames. Haycocks is, in his spare time, a leading light in the Wokingham Choral Society.

He has two children, Timothy and Elizabeth.
