= Wake Up to Money =

- Genre: UK business
- Running time: 60 minutes
- Country of origin: UK
- Language: English
- Home station: BBC Radio 5 Live
- Hosted by: Sean Farrington; Felicity Hannah; Will Bain
- Produced by: Business and Economics Unit, BBC News
- Original release: March 1994
- Podcast: https://www.bbc.co.uk/programmes/b0070lr5

Wake Up to Money is an early morning financial radio programme on BBC Radio 5 Live. It is broadcast from 05:00 to 06:00 each weekday.

== History ==
The programme was established when Radio 5 Live began broadcasting in March 1994. It has been produced by the Business Programmes section of BBC Radio which produces for Radio 4 and 5 Live in the Business and Economics Unit. It began as a fifteen-minute programme, starting at 05:45, as part of the Morning Reports programme. It became a programme in its own right on 29 April 2002, starting at 05:30. The format was updated in early 2014: the broadcast time was extended to 45 minutes with the show starting at 05:15. It was extended again in 2020 and now occupies the full hour between 05:00 and 06:00.

Until 2020, the programme was hosted by a main presenter with a co-presenter, who would provide the shares news on the FTSE 100 Index, the commodities prices and currencies' markets, and specialise more in companies' financial performance, history, and corporate structure. Mickey Clark was the longest serving co-presenter, from March 1994 until February 2020, when the programme was changed to a single presenter format. Current main presenters include Sean Farrington, Will Bain and Felicity Hannah.

== Content ==
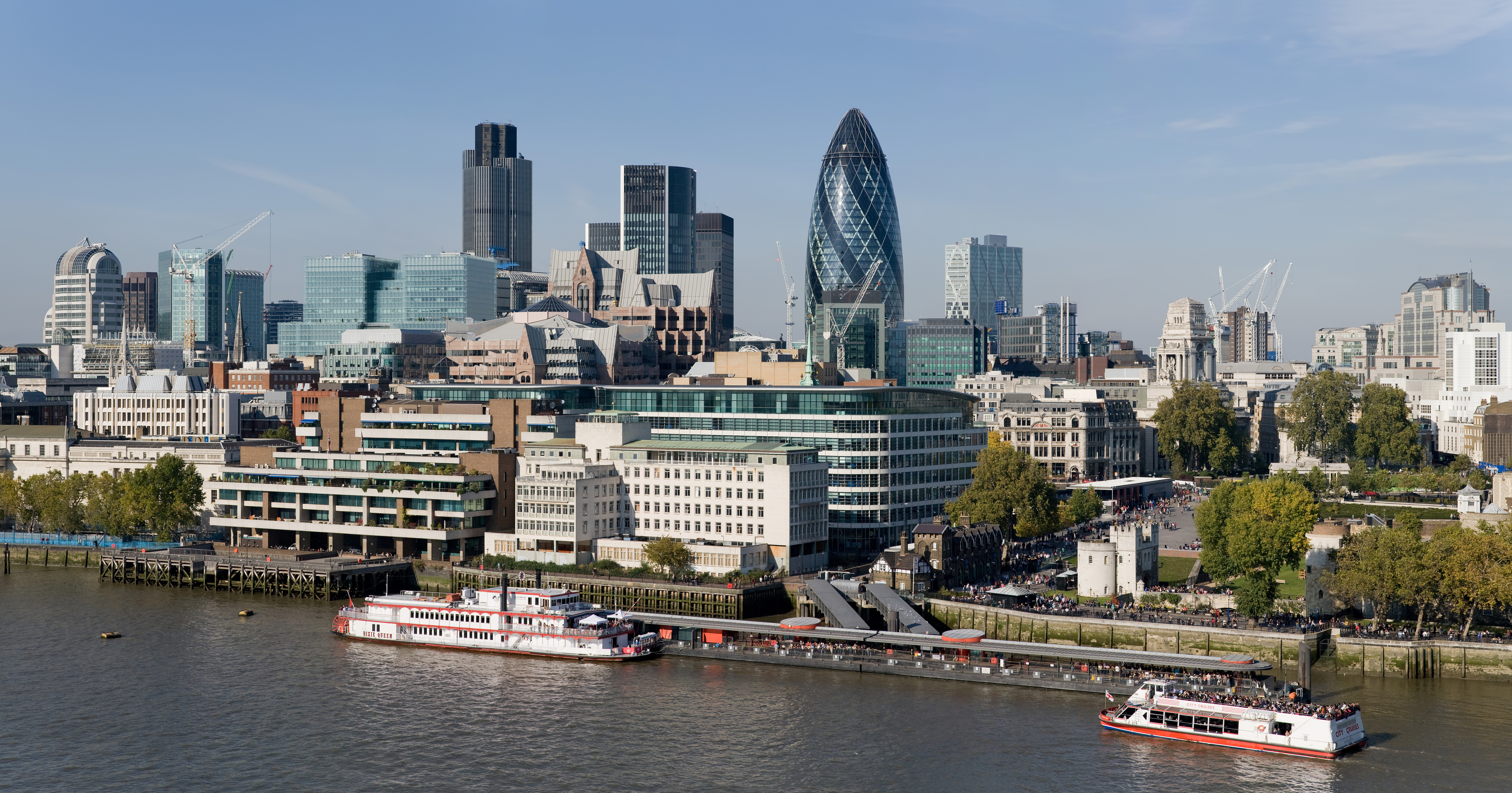
The City of London features in every programme

The show has a broad scope, covering a wide range of business, economics, finance and technology stories. There is a focus on UK domestic business news, but major international stories are also covered. There is a BBC reporter based in Singapore, who gives updates on the global financial markets. There is an element of (cheeky sarcasm) humour to the programme.

Interviewees are invited to take part in live discussions on the programme. Guests range from company executives, academic experts and business professionals to general members of the public.

Expert guests are often from industry trade groups, such as the CBI, IoD, FSB, university business schools, or watchdogs.

There is also a regular UK markets guest poised to discuss company, commodities or currencies news, and to comment on any breaking business stories. These contributors are often based in the City of London. Frequent guests have included David Buik, and Justin Urquhart Stewart of Seven Investment Management.

In 2008/09, the banks featured heavily; rarely had a programme not mentioned the state of the UK banks or the Financial Services Authority.

From 2016-2020, Brexit was covered regularly, and since mid-March 2020, the impact of COVID-19 on British businesses and the UK economy has often led the programme's news agenda.

== Broadcasts ==
The programme is also carried by Radio Scotland, Radio Ulster, Radio Wales and Radio Foyle during those stations' downtime. After broadcast, the show is uploaded as a podcast on BBC Sounds.

== Former presenters ==
- Adrian Chiles - from March 1994, until the mid-1990s. He later married the co-presenter of the Morning Reports programme, Jane Garvey
- Mickey Clark - from March 1994, until February 2020.
- Philippa Lamb - followed Adrian Chiles and later went on to present 5 Live's Moneycheck and Radio 4's Nice Work
- Declan Curry - from the mid-1990s until 1997
- Pauline McCole - regular stand-in presenter since 2001
- Simon Jack - presents business for Today
- Paul Lewis - from August 1997 until 11 August 2000
- Guy Ruddle - from 2000 until December 2005, later made podcasts for The Telegraph
- Adam Shaw
- Andrew Verity
- Adam Parsons
- Dominic Laurie
- Jeremy Naylor
- Rob Young
- Adam Kirtley - regular stand in presenter, 2012-14

== See also ==
- Working Lunch - finished at the end of July 2010
- Squawk Box Europe
- Money Box
- Financial World Tonight (former series)
- Category:Economy of the United Kingdom
