= BBC Radio 5 Live =

UK national radio station

- Logo used since 2022
- Salford (Note: Radio 5 Live also broadcasts from some studios in London and Glasgow, as well as numerous sporting stadiums around the country and abroad); United Kingdom
- Frequencies: MW: 693kHz, 909kHz, 990kHz and on BBC Local Radio stations' frequencies overnight. DAB: 12B; Freeview: 705; Freesat: 705; Sky (UK only): 0105; Virgin Media: 905; Virgin Media Ireland: 911; Astra 2E (28.2°E) satellite Telstar 12 Vantage (15.0°W) satellite

Programming
- Language: English
- Format: News/talk/sport

Ownership
- Owner: BBC
- Operator: BBC North
- Sister stations: BBC Radio 5 Sports Extra

History
- First air date: 28 March 1994; 32 years ago
- Former call signs: BBC Radio 5 (1990–1994)

Technical information
- Licensing authority: Ofcom

Links
- Website: BBC Radio 5 Live via BBC Sounds

BBC Radio 5 Live is a British national radio station owned and operated by the BBC. It broadcasts news, sport, discussion, interviews and phone-ins, 24 hours a day. It is the principal BBC radio station covering sport in the United Kingdom, broadcasting virtually all major sports events staged in the UK or involving British competitors. The station broadcasts from MediaCityUK, in Salford, Greater Manchester, England, and is a department of the BBC North division.

Radio 5 Live was launched in March 1994, as a repositioning of the original Radio 5 that was launched in 1990. Overnight programming of 5 Live is also simulcast on the BBC's local and national stations throughout the UK. Due to rights restrictions, coverage of some events on Radio 5 Live, particularly live sport, is either restricted to listeners in the UK addresses or not available on-line.

According to RAJAR, the station broadcasts to a weekly audience of 5.5 million, with a listening share of 3.1% as of July 2025.

== History ==
The first logo used from launch until 1997

The success of BBC Radio 4 News FM during the first Gulf War (1991) led the BBC to propose the launch of a rolling news service. Initially, the plan was to broadcast a rolling news service on BBC Radio 4's long wave frequency; but this met with considerable opposition, both internally and externally,

=== Original plan ===
In 1991, a proposal for a new radio news channel had been blocked by Michael Green, the controller of Radio 4. This new radio news radio network would have carried the main Radio 4 news programmes such as The World at One.

On Tuesday 14 July 1992, a new 24-hour radio news channel was announced at the Radio Academy national conference in Birmingham. The new radio news channel would start no later than January 1994, on long wave. The new channel would cost £9m a year; in comparison, Radio 4 cost £65m a year.

The original plan to broadcast the service on the Radio 4 long wave frequency was dropped by October 1993, following considerable protests from Radio 4 listeners. Instead, the BBC decided to close Radio 5, replacing the old service's educational and children's programmes with a new news service, whilst retaining its sports programmes.

=== Broadcasting ===
BBC Radio 5 Live began its 24-hour service at 05:00 on Monday 28 March 1994. The first voice on air, Jane Garvey, later went on to co-present the breakfast and drive time shows with Peter Allen. The Times described the launch as "slip[ping] smoothly and confidently into a routine of informative banter" and The Scotsman as "professionalism at its slickest."

The news of the first day was dominated by the fatal stabbing at Hall Garth School, near Middlesbrough, the first of many major incidents which the network covered live as they unfolded.

The tone of the channel, engaging and more relaxed than contemporary BBC output, was the key to the channel's success and set the model for other BBC News services later in the decade. The first audiences were around 4 million, with a record audience of 6.25 million. Among the key editorial staff involved in the design of programme formats and recruitment of staff for the new station were Sara Nathan, later editor of Channel 4 News, and Tim Luckhurst, later editor of The Scotsman newspaper and professor of journalism at the University of Kent.

2000–2007 Five live logo

In 2000, the station was rebranded with a new logo which would remain with the station for another seven years.

On 2 February 2002, a companion station, BBC Radio 5 Live Sports Extra, was launched as a digital-only service to complement the range of sport and to avoid schedule clashes; previously BBC Local Radio stations and, for cricket, the long wave frequency of BBC Radio 4 were used.

Throughout the 2000s, 5 Live gained several awards including five Sony Awards in 2005; the single gold award was for its coverage of the 2004 Asian tsunami in the News Story Award category alongside another four silver awards and six nominations. The station also began to further its boundaries with the publication of the Radio 5 Live Sporting Yearbook.

The BBC Radio 5 Live logo used from 2007 until 2022.

In August 2007, BBC Radio 5 Live was given a new logo in line with the rest of the BBC Radio network, and a new background design featuring diagonal parallel lines.

=== Move to Salford ===
In 2008, the BBC announced that the station would move to MediaCityUK in Salford.

In 2017/18, it was noted the station not only remained as having the fourth highest cost-per-user of all the BBC radio output, but whose costs also increased; they rose from 2.3p per hour the previous year to 2.5p per hour, therefore equal to 1Xtra. The audience Appreciation Index figure did not increase, remaining at 79.9; the average length of time spent on the channel fell from 6h:41m to 6:34, the fourth lowest fall of all of the BBC's radio stations.

== Broadcasting ==
BBC Radio 5 Live broadcasts in AM on the medium wave frequencies 693 and 909kHz nationally, with the frequency 990kHz used in Cardigan Bay in west Wales; these frequencies had been utilised by the old BBC Radio 5, which in turn had taken over the frequencies from BBC Radio 2.

Uniquely to the BBC Radio network, it is the only station that is neither purely digital (Note: Such as 1Xtra, Radio 4 Extra and 6 Music.) nor broadcast in analogue on FM. It is however broadcast in stereo on FM and DAB on BBC Local Radio frequencies overnight; from 01:00 until BBC Local Radio commences morning broadcasts, usually at 06:00. BBC Radio 5 Live is also broadcast on BBC Radio Wales from 01:00 until 06:00, on BBC Radio Scotland from midnight until 06:00, and on BBC Radio Ulster from midnight until 06:30.

In addition to the AM output, the station also broadcasts:

- digitally in mono on DAB Digital Radio
- on television through satellite services, such as Sky
- cable services, such as Virgin Media
- DTT services, such as Freeview, Freesat and through IPTV.

The station also broadcasts programmes live through BBC Sounds, which allows replaying programmes up to a month after the original broadcast. The service is also available on the Radioplayer internet site partially run by the BBC.

For many years, the station operated from four floors within the News Centre at BBC Television Centre, because of the close connections between the station and BBC News, and the co-location of BBC Sport.

However, as part of the corporation's plan to sell off Television Centre, the decision was made in 2008 to move BBC Radio 5 Live to the new broadcast hub at MediaCityUK. The move itself began in September 2011 and took two months.

The new studios occupy a single floor in Quay House, with two studios large enough for several guests and a separate studio for large groups. The station continues to have a studio presence in London, with Studio 51A at BBC Broadcasting House in London used for programmes and interviews made in London for the station.

BBC Radio 5 Live has started turning off medium wave frequencies. Currently the switch-offs are low powered fill-in transmitters which provide coverage in areas where the main transmitters do not provide a robust signal. The first to be switched off was the Bexhill transmitter on 31 March 2026, followed by the Folkestone and Redruth transmitters on 31 July 2026. On 28 July 2026, the BBC announced that the Brighton and Exeter transmitters will be turned off on 30 September 2026. It is expected that all MW transmission of the station will end by the end of 2027.

== List of current programmes broadcast ==
- Dotun Adebayo (Monday – Thursday)
- Kathryn Stanczyszyn (Friday - Sunday)
- Wake Up to Money with Sean Farrington and Louise Cooper
- 5 Live Breakfast with Rick Edwards and Rachel Burden (Monday – Thursday), Steffan Powell and Rima Ahmed (Friday)
- Nicky Campbell (Monday – Friday)
- Naga Munchetty (Monday – Wednesday) & Adrian Chiles (Thursday – Friday)
- Matt Chorley (Monday – Friday)
- 5 Live Drive with Chris Warburton and Clare McDonnell
- Elis James and John Robins (Friday)
- 5 Live Sport with Mark Chapman (Monday, Wednesday and Saturday), Kelly Cates (Tuesday), Eleanor Oldroyd (Thursday), Darren Fletcher (Friday) and Steve Crossman (Sunday)
- Stephen Nolan (Friday – Sunday)
- 5 Live Boxing with Mike Costello and Steve Bunce (Saturday)
- Saturday Breakfast with Jeanette Kwakye and Eleanor Oldroyd
- Patrick Kielty (Saturday)
- Tailenders with Greg James, Jimmy Anderson and Felix White (summer Saturdays)
- Fighting Talk with Rick Edwards (Saturday)
- Sports Report with Mark Chapman (Saturday)
- 606 with Eilish Barbour and Chris Sutton (Saturday – Sunday)
- Sunday Breakfast with Jeanette Kwakye and Steffan Powell
- Colin Murray (Sunday)
- 5 Live Science with Chris Smith and the Naked Scientists team (Sunday)
- Headliners with Nihal Arthanayake (Sunday).

== Programming ==
=== News ===
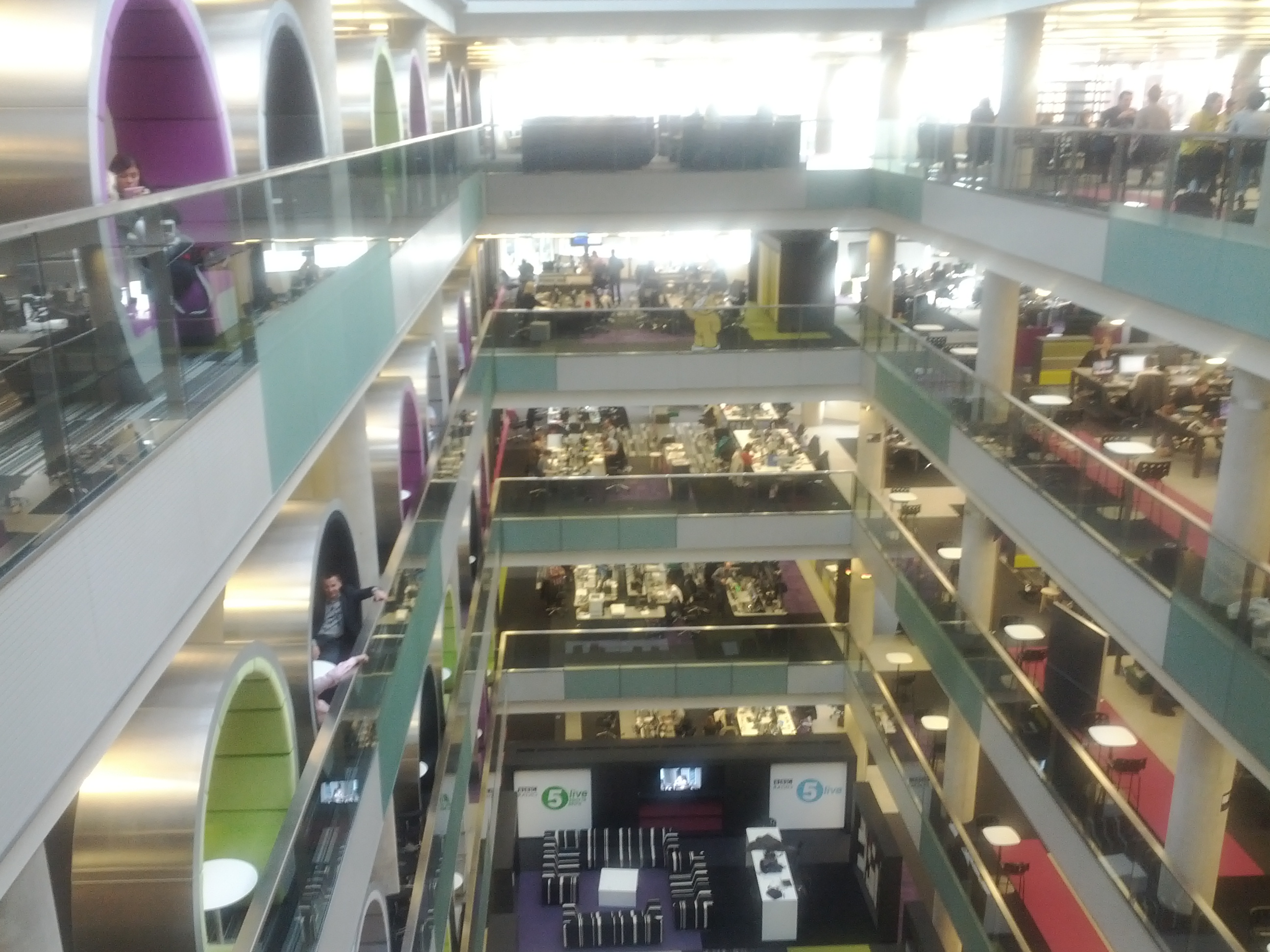
BBC Radio 5 Live at MediaCityUK

BBC Radio 5 Live's remit includes broadcasting rolling news and transmitting news as it breaks. It offers news bulletins every half an hour, apart from during live sports commentaries. The BBC's policy for major breaking news events revolves around a priority list. With UK news, the correspondent first records a "generic minute" summary (for use by all stations and channels); the subsequent priority is to report on Radio 5 Live, then the BBC News Channel, and then any other programmes that are on air. For foreign news, first a "generic minute" is recorded, then reports are to BBC World Service radio, then the reporter talks to any other programmes that are on air.

Due to the COVID-19 pandemic, the hourly news bulletins were shared with BBC Radio 2 from April 2020. Three minute bulletins are broadcast on the hour, with extended five minute bulletins at:

- Weekdays: 06:00, 07:00, 08:00, 13:00 and 17:00
- Saturdays: 07:00 and 08:00
- Sundays: 06:00, 07:00, 08:00 and 09:00.

Half-hour news headlines are read mostly by presenters and sports journalists, although newsreaders are used during weekday daytime programming between 10:30 and 15:30, and during 5 Live Sport evening and weekend programming. Since April 2025, BBC Radio 5 Live has been simulcasting overnight news bulletins from the World Service via Radio 4.

=== Sport ===
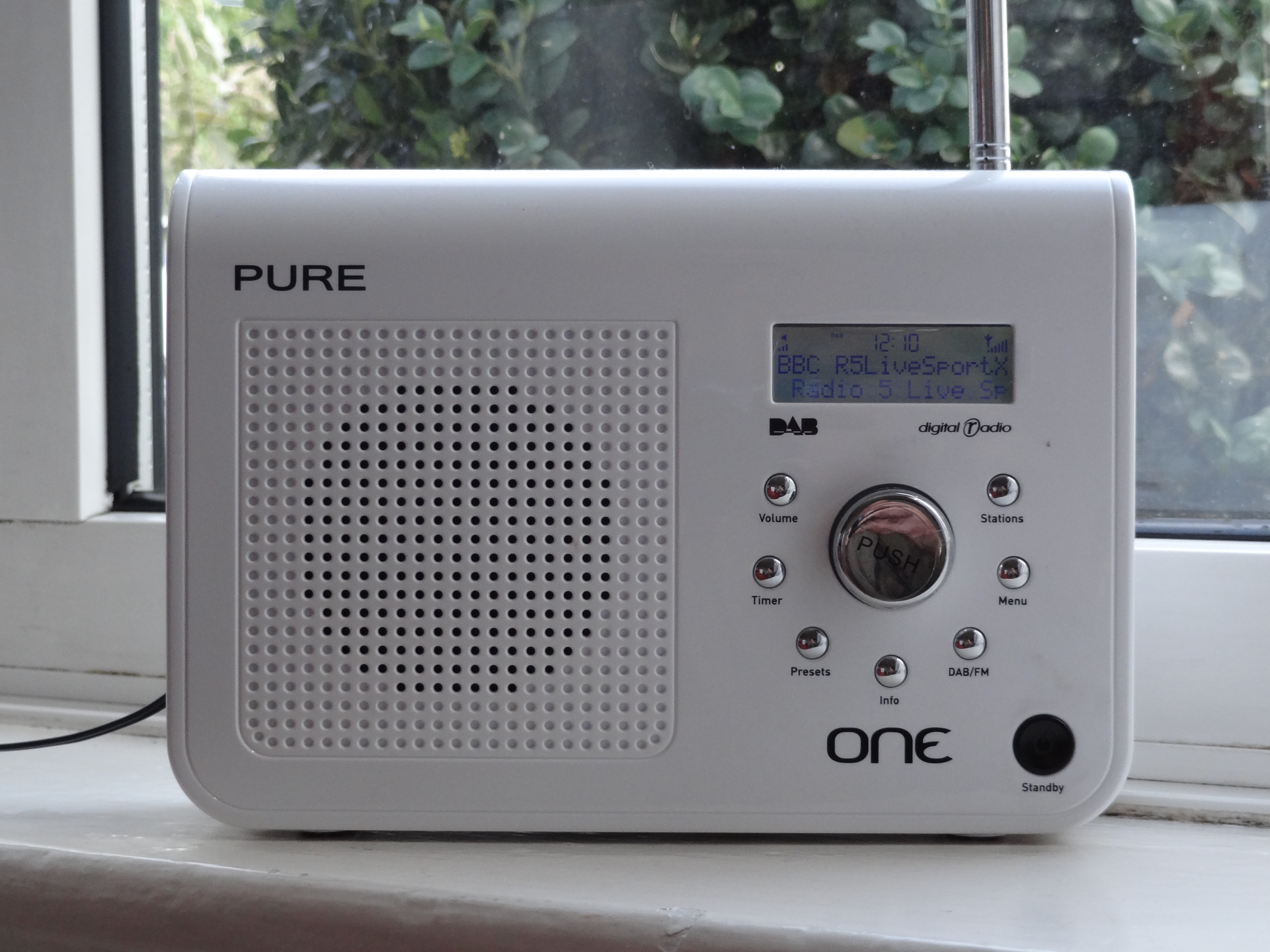
BBC Radio 5 Live Sport playing

BBC Radio 5 Live broadcasts an extremely wide range of sports and covers all the major sporting events, mostly under its flagship sports banner 5 Live Sport. In the event that the broadcast rights to a particular event are also on BBC Television and a technical fault were to ensue, the commentary of 5 Live is simulcast on the affected BBC channel until the problem is rectified.

One such occurrence was during Euro 2008 where thunderstorms caused satellite disruptions, but BBC One simulcast the 5 Live commentary.

While football commentaries form the majority of live commentaries during the football season, the range of events covered by the station include:

- Live Premier League (simulcasted with BBC World Service for international coverage (Note: 15:00 Saturday and 16:30 Sunday kick-offs only))
  - 15:00 Saturday matches
  - 17:30 Saturday night matches (Note: Unavailable for international coverage.)
  - 14:00 and 16:30 Sunday matches (14:00 kickoffs are unavailable for international coverage)
  - Selected 16:00 Sunday matches on the week 38 only
  - Selected midweek matches
- Live FA Community Shield (simulcasted with BBC World Service for international coverage)
- Live FA Cup (Note: Matches involving Premier League sides are available for international coverage on BBC World Service)
  - Selected third to fifth round ties
  - Selected quarter-final ties
  - FA Cup semi-finals
  - FA Cup final
- Live EFL Cup
  - Select second to fourth round ties
  - Select quarter-final ties
  - EFL Cup semi-finals
  - EFL Cup final
- Live Scottish Premiership
  - The Old Firm
- FIFA World Cup
- UEFA European Championship
- Home Nations international football matches
  - Friendly matches
  - UEFA European Qualifiers
  - UEFA Nations League
  - FIFA Women's World Cup
  - UEFA Women's Euro
- UEFA Champions League
  - Select group stage matches
  - Select knockout stage matches
  - UEFA Champions League final
- UEFA Europa League
  - Select group stage matches
  - Select knockout stage matches
  - UEFA Europa League final (if British side is involved)
- UEFA Europa Conference League
  - Select group stage matches
  - Select knockout stage matches
  - UEFA Europa Conference League final (if British side is involved)
- FIFA Club World Cup (if British side is involved)
- Olympic Games
- Commonwealth Games
- Men's Golf Majors, including full coverage of The Open Championship and The Masters
- Ryder Cup
- England rugby union test matches
- The Autumn Internationals and Six Nations Championship (English, Scottish and Welsh sides only; simulcast with BBC Radio Scotland, Radio nan Gàidheal, BBC Radio Wales and Radio Cymru)
- World Series
- Super Bowl
- Rugby World Cup
- Formula One
- Full coverage of The Grand National and The Cheltenham Festival
- Commentary of the Epsom Derby and Royal Ascot
- Boxing
- World Athletics Championships
- Full coverage of the Wimbledon Tennis Championships
- London Marathon
- The Boat Race
- The Tour de France.

== Controllers ==
Years served	Controller
1997–1999	Roger Mosey
2000–2007	Bob Shennan
2008–2012	Adrian Van Klaveren
2013 – September 2019	Jonathan Wall
2019–present	Heidi Dawson

== 5 Sports Extra ==
As 5 Live cannot accommodate all of the sports which they have rights to broadcast, some are covered on sister station Sports Extra, including:

- Test Match Special commentary of all home England cricket tests, One Day Internationals and T20 Internationals
- Cricket World Cup, ICC Champions Trophy, and Twenty20 World Cup
- Selected County Championship, Royal London One-Day Cup and Vitality Blast games from BBC Local Radio
- Selected Super League and Challenge Cup Rugby League games
- All 'Grand Slam' Tennis tournaments
- Selected Premiership Rugby and European Rugby Champions Cup games from BBC Local Radio
- Formula One
- IIHF World Championships
- Action from any other competition broadcast on 5 Live.

Sports Extra typically emphasises full broadcasts of Premier League and Home Nations international football, if games overlap each other. 5 Live carries the first-choice match in such cases.

Also, should 5 Live be needed to broadcast news coverage when scheduled sports programmes were to be aired, the sports coverage is shifted to 5 Sports Extra.

The station had originally launched in 2002 as Radio 5 Live Sports Extra, but had its name changed in 2022 as part of a rebranding of the BBC.

== See also ==
- List of BBC radio stations
