= Oxford "-er" =

Colloquial suffix

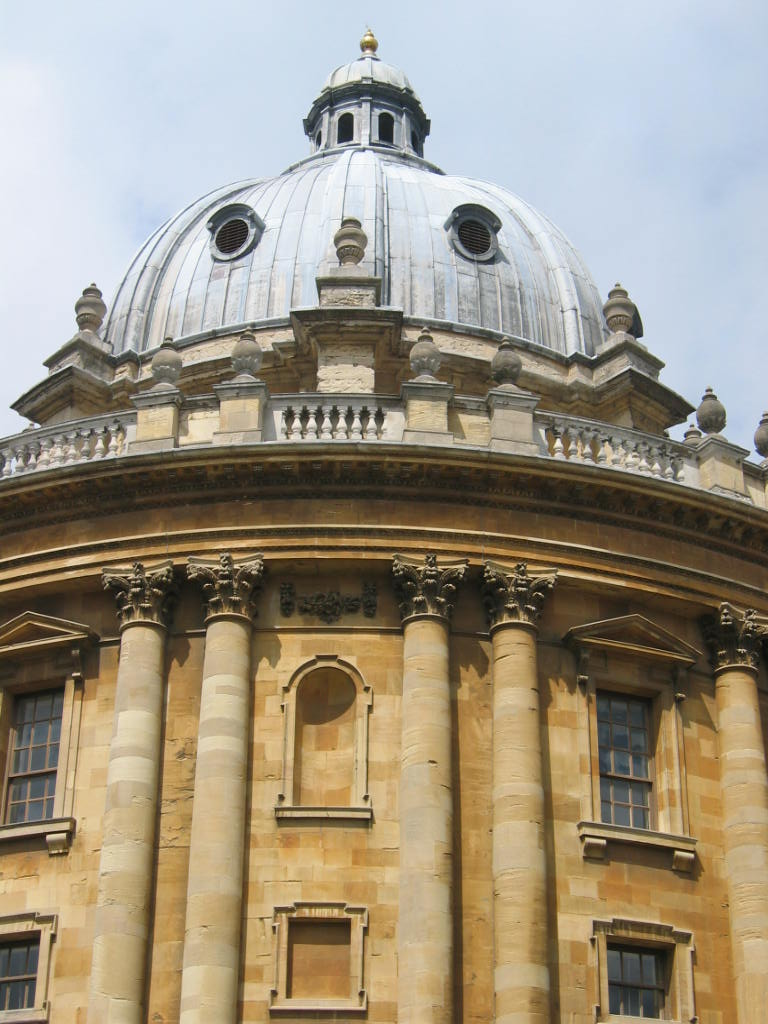
Radcliffe Camera, Oxford – the "Radder"

The Oxford "-er", or often "-ers", is a colloquial and sometimes facetious suffix prevalent at Oxford University from about 1875, which is thought to have been borrowed from the slang of Rugby School. The term was defined by the lexicographer Eric Partridge in his Dictionary of Slang and Unconventional English (several editions 1937–61).

== Rugger, footer and soccer ==
The "-er" gave rise to such words as rugger and the now archaic footer for Rugby football, while soccer was used for association football. Togger was widely used for the Torpids Eights races held in early Spring, and for the crews that rowed in them. In The Oxford Magazine of 27 February 1906, the Trinity College correspondent reported that "Our First Togger bumped Pembroke on Thursday, New College II on Saturday, Brasenose on Monday, Exeter on Tuesday. The Second Togger bumped Wadham on Thursday, Keble II on Friday, and St. Catherine's on Monday. We wish them continued success."

The term "soccer", derived from a transformation/emendation of the "assoc" in association football, was popularised by a prominent English footballer, Charles Wreford-Brown (1866–1951). The first recorded use of "soccer" was in 1895 (or even earlier in 1892). Two years earlier The Western Gazette reported that "W. Neilson was elected captain of 'rugger' and T. N. Perkins of 'socker'" and Henry Watson Fowler recommended socker in preference to "soccer" to emphasise its correct pronunciation (i.e. hard "cc/ck"). In this context, he suggested that "baccy", because of the "cc" in "tobacco", was "more acceptable than soccer" (there being no "cc" in "Association"). "Socker" was the form that appeared in the first edition of the Concise Oxford Dictionary (1911).

The sports writer E. W. Swanton, who joined the London Evening Standard in 1927, recalled that "Rugby football ... in those days, I think, was never called anything but rugger unless it were just football". Around the same time the Conservative Minister Leo Amery noted that, for his thirteen-year-old son Jack, "footer in the rain [was] a very real grievance" at Harrow School.

=== In literature ===
P. G. Wodehouse makes several references to footer in his early school stories, The Gold Bat (A & C Black, 1904), The White Feather (A & C Black, 1907) and Mike (A & C Black, 1909), all of which had first been serialised in The Captain before appearing in book form.

In Evelyn Waugh's Brideshead Revisited (1945), Oxford undergraduate Anthony Blanche claims that "I was lunching with my p-p-preposterous tutor. He thought it very odd my leaving when I did. I told him I had to change for f-f-footer."

In Stiff Upper Lip, Jeeves (1963), Wodehouse has Bertie Wooster being asked whether he was fond of rugger, to which he replied "I don't think I know him".

As late as 1972 the retired headmaster of a Hertfordshire grammar school recalled "the footer" (by which he meant rugby) having had a poor season in 1953–54.

== What is and is not ==
Typically such words are formed by abbreviating or altering the original word and adding "-er". Words to which "-er" is simply suffixed to provide a word with a different, though related, meaning – such as "Peeler" (early Metropolitan policeman, after Sir Robert Peel) and "exhibitioner" (an undergraduate holding a type of scholarship called an exhibition) – are not examples. Nor are slang nouns like "bounder" or "scorcher", formed by adding "-er" to a verb. "Topper" (for "top hat") may appear to be an example, but as a word meaning excellent person or thing, existed from the early 18th century. Both "top hat" and "topper" as synonymous terms date from Regency times (c.1810–20) and Partridge (op. cit.) seems to suggest that the former, itself originally slang, may have been derived from the latter.

Words like "rotter" (a disagreeable person, after "rotten") are somewhere in between. Fiver and tenner (for five and ten pound note respectively) probably do fit the "-er" mould, as, more obviously, does oncer (one pound note), though this was always less prevalent than the higher denominations and is virtually obsolete following the introduction of the pound coin in 1983.

During the First World War the Belgian town of Ypres was known to British soldiers as "Wipers" (and this is still often used by the town's inhabitants if speaking English). This had some hallmarks of an "-er" coinage and the form would have been familiar to many young officers, but "Wipers" was essentially an attempt to anglicize a name (/ipʁ/) that some soldiers found difficult to pronounce. In the BBC TV series Blackadder Goes Forth (Richard Curtis and Ben Elton, 1988), a comedy series set in the trenches during the First World War, Captain Edmund Blackadder (Rowan Atkinson) and Lieutenant George (Hugh Laurie) occasionally addressed Private Baldrick (Tony Robinson) as Balders.

A common extension of the "-er" (though here the schwa sound is usually spelled "-a" rather than "-er") is found in names containing a pronounced "r", e.g., "Darren", "Barry", etc. where in addition to the "-er", the "r"-sound is replaced by a "zz" so one gets "Dazza" from "Darren", "Bazza" from "Barry".

== Test Match Special ==
The "-er" form was famously used on BBC radio's Test Match Special by Brian Johnston (1912–94). Johnston was ex-Eton and New College, Oxford, and widely known as Johnners. He bestowed nicknames on his fellow commentators on Test cricket: Blowers for Henry Blofeld (who was known in Australia as "Blofly"), Aggers (Jonathan Agnew), Bearders (scorer Bill Frindall, known also as "the Bearded Wonder") and McGillers (Alan McGilvray of the ABC). The habit extended to cricketers such as Phil Tufnell (Tuffers), but the "-ie" suffix is more common for commentating ex-players of this century, such as Michael Vaughan ("Vaughnie") or Shane Warne ("Warnie").

The former Hampshire County Cricket Club captain Colin Ingleby-Mackenzie, whose most usual nickname was McCrackers, was sometimes addressed as Ingers when he made occasional appearances on TMS, and former Middlesex bowler and journalist Mike Selvey was referred to as Selvers. The programme's producer, Peter Baxter, cited Backers as his own nickname and Jenkers as that of commentator and cricketing journalist, Christopher Martin-Jenkins (though the latter was better known by his initials, "CMJ").

Following his death in 1994, the satirical magazine Private Eye published a cartoon of Johnston arriving at the gates of heaven with the greeting "Morning, Godders". An earlier Eye cartoon by McLachlan, reproduced in the 2007 edition of Wisden, included in its long caption a reference to former England bowler Fred Trueman as Fredders (in fact, his common nickname, bestowed by Johnston, was "Sir Frederick"), while yummers (i.e. "yummy") was applied to "another lovely cake sent in by one of our listeners". Blowers (Henry Blofeld) has continued the tradition, referring on one occasion to a particular stroke as inexplickers (inexplicable).

== Other personal forms ==
Other "-er"s as personal names include:

- Athers: Lancashire and England cricket captain Michael Atherton (b. 1968), who subsequently became a commentator on both radio and TV ("all cricket-lovers have crackpot theories, even Athers");
- Beckers: former England football captain David Beckham (b. 1975) became known almost universally as "Becks" (and with his wife Victoria, formerly of the Spice Girls, as "Posh and Becks"), but there are some instances of his being referred to as "Beckers";
- Beemer: Rich Beem, professional golfer, television commentator and analyst.
- Betjers: as an undergraduate, the poet John Betjeman (1906–1984) was generally known as "Betjy" or "Betj", but Philip Larkin, among others, later adopted the "-er" form;
- Blashers: the magazine Country Life referred to the explorer Colonel John Blashford-Snell (b. 1936) as "Blashers" (as in "Hats off to Blashers", reporting his having assisted in the design of a hat for explorers);
- Brackers: Football commentator Peter Brackley was known as "Brackers". Tim Wonnacott also used this form with reference to Bargain Hunt expert James Braxton (owner of Edgar Horns Auctioneers, Eastbourne) during the 2008 series of the programme.
- Britters: American singer Britney Spears (b. 1981) was often described in the British press as "Britters". Her boyfriend when she first rose to fame, the singer Justin Timberlake (b. 1981), was Timbers.
- Bozzer (or "Bozza"): British Prime Minister Boris Johnson (b. 1964)
- Camers or Cammers: applied occasionally to British Prime Minister David Cameron (b. 1966), notably by bloggers or spoof writers and especially with reference to his educational background (Eton and Oxford);
- Cheggers: broadcaster Keith Chegwin (1957-2017);
- Chunners: Street Fighter video game character Chun-Li;
- Cleggers: Nick Clegg (b. 1967), British Deputy Prime Minister 2010-2015: shortly after the formation of a coalition government, a cartoon by Peter Brookes of The Times, had Prime Minister David Cameron saying, "Polish these [boots], Cleggers, old son ...";
- Crabbers: former Sunderland AFC local radio commentator Simon Crabtree;
- Gazza: former footballer and manager Paul Gascoigne b. 1967
- Griggers: recounting how she met John Betjeman, Alice Jennings, a programme engineer at the BBC during the Second World War referred to producer Geoffrey Grigson (1905–85) as follows: "John said, 'Who's that girl?' And Griggers from a great height said, 'That's your PE'";
- Hatters was used by Private Eye with reference to Roy, Lord Hattersley (1932–2026), former Deputy Leader of the British Labour Party;
- Jezza: former Labour Party leader Jeremy Corbyn and TV personality Jeremy Clarkson
- From the 1960s and subsequently, Elanwy Jones of Collett Dickenson Pearce was known to her circle as Lanners;
- Macca : musician Paul McCartney
- Mozzer (or "Mozza"): musician Morrissey
- Notters: during the Falklands War of 1982 Conservative MP and diarist Alan Clark referred to British Defence Secretary John Nott (1932-2024) as "poor old Notters";
- Pragger Wagger: various holders of the title of Prince of Wales, probably originally referring to Edward VII when heir apparent;
- Rampers: the Surrey (and former Middlesex) cricketer Mark Ramprakash (b. 1969): "I could not help wondering how 'Rampers' would have dealt with their ageing attack" (Bill Frindall, 2007);
- Rodders for Rodney, as in the BBC radio comedy series, Beyond Our Ken (1958–64), when Hugh Paddick, playing the part of Charles, addressed his camp friend Rodney (Kenneth Williams): "Absolutely dolly, Rodders". Rodney Trotter in Only Fools and Horses is often referred to as Rodders by his brother Del Boy.
- Tatters: the Yorkshire squire, Sir Tatton Sykes (1826-1913), father of politician and diplomat Sir Mark Sykes and great-great-grandfather of novelist and socialite Plum Sykes (Worcester College), was referred to in the novels of Robert Surtees as "Tatters" or "Old Tat";
- Thickers: John Thicknesse, cricket correspondent of the London Evening Standard 1967–96;
- Tinners: Peter Tinniswood (1936–2003), TV scriptwriter and author of Tales from the Long Room;
- Tollers: the Oxford nickname of writer J.R.R. Tolkien (1892–1973);
- Tuffers: Middlesex and England cricketer Phil Tufnell (b. 1966)
- Twitters: nickname of Henry Herbert, 4th Earl of Carnarvon (1831–1890), British Colonial Secretary in the 1860s-70s, on account of his twitchy behaviour;
- Whiters: used privately by broadcaster Carol Vorderman to address Richard Whiteley (1943–2005), her co-presenter of Countdown;
- Widders: former British Government Minister Ann Widdecombe (1947–2026) was so described by journalist Hugo Vickers.
- Woolers: sports journalist Ian Wooldridge (1932–2007).

== Oxford ==
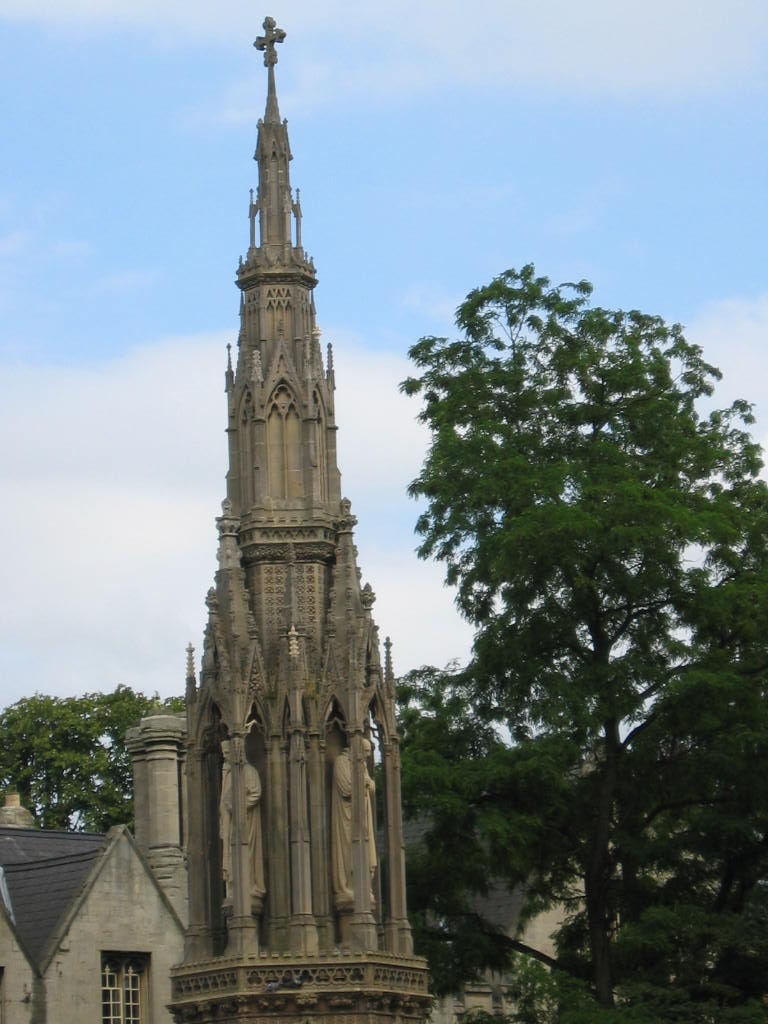
Martyrs' Memorial ("Maggers Memoggers") at the south end of St Giles' (the "Giler"), Oxford

=== University and City locations ===
"-er" forms of Oxford locations include:

- Adders: Addison's Walk, Magdalen College;
- All Soggers: All Souls (as, e.g., in the Letters of Philip Larkin);
- Bodder: Bodleian Library;
- Compers and Benders: Compline and Benediction, Magdalen College;
- Deepers: the beer cellar of Lincoln College, officially "Deep Hall";
- the Giler: the street St Giles'; also St Giles' Café;
- Jaggers: Jesus College;
- memugger: memorial, particularly the Martyrs' Memorial, which has also been referred to as Maggers Memoggers;
- Radder: Radcliffe Camera;
- Staggers: St Stephen's House;
- Stanners: members of St Anne's College;
- Wuggers (or sometimes, Wuggins): Worcester College.

=== Other Oxonian forms ===
- Bonners was undergraduate slang for bonfire (c. 1890s), possibly, as Partridge suggests, an allusion to Bishop Edmund Bonner of London (c. 1500–1569) who was involved in the burning of alleged heretics under Queen Mary I.
- Bullers for the University Police, or bulldogs: for example, "The [University] proctors ... go about accompanied by small, thickset men in blue suits and bowler hats, who are known as bullers" (Edmund Crispin (1946) The Moving Toyshop).
- Bumpers for a bumps race in rowing was in use at both Oxford and Cambridge from about the turn of the 20th century and may have arisen first at Shrewsbury School.
- Congratters (or simply, gratters), now very dated as a form of congratulations, was recorded by Desmond Coke (1879–1931) in Sandford of Merton (1903).
- Cuppers is an inter-collegiate sporting competition, derived from "cup".
- Divvers referred to divinity as a subject of study, as, for example, when John Betjeman, as an undergraduate in 1928, published "a special 'Divvers' number of The University News, complete with cut-out Old and New Testament cribs in the form of shirt cuffs to enable candidates to cheat in the exam".
- Eccer (pronounced ekker) for exercise.
- Sonners was the nickname of William Stallybrass, the inter-war principal of Brasenose.

== Other examples ==
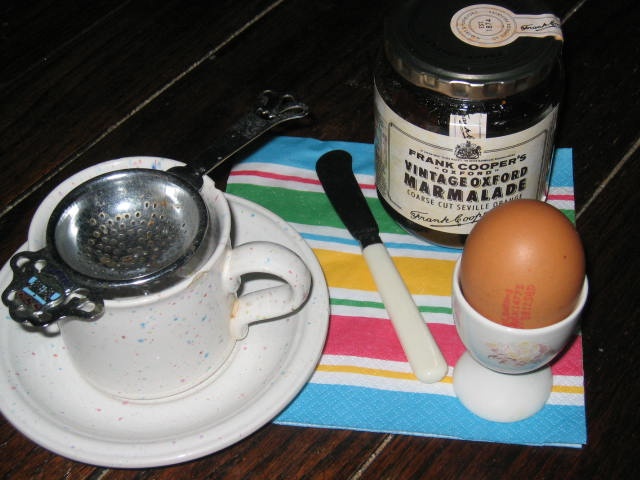
A little light bre(a)kker

Brekker, breakker or brekkers (for breakfast) is a coinage from the 1880s still in occasional use. In 1996, Jessica Mitford (1917–1996) in one of her final letters to her sister, Deborah, Duchess of Devonshire, referred to "proper boiled eggs for breakker". Shampers (champagne) occurs frequently, often spelt champers: "They like champers up north".

At Cambridge University, cleaning staff who change bed linen and towels in college rooms are referred to as "bedders".

Simon Raven (1927–2001), describing an episode on military service in the late 1940s, referred several times to a particular brigadier as "the Brigger".

Terms from Harrow School include bluer (blue blazer) and yarder (school yard).

A flat-sided conker (fruit of a horse-chestnut) is known as a cheeser, an "-er" contraction of "cheese-cutter". The names applied to conkers that have triumphed in conker fights are arguably "-er" forms ("one-er", "twelver", etc), though "conker" itself is derived from a dialect word for the shell of a snail.

=== 20th-century novelists ===
There are few "-ers" in the books of P. G. Wodehouse, though, with reference to a boundary in cricket scoring four runs, his poem, "The Cricketer in Winter" contained the line, "And giving batsmen needless fourers" (which he rhymed with "more errs"). The "-er" was evident also in the school cricketing stories of E. F. Benson: "Owlers (this, of course, was Mr Howliss)" (David Blaize, 1916). In the two Chimneys novels of Agatha Christie, a pompous Cabinet Minister was nicknamed Codders because of his bulging eyes (presumably an allusion to the cod fish).

Evelyn Waugh referred to his books Remote People (1931) and Black Mischief (1932) as Remoters and Blackers and to Madresfield Court, the country seat of the Earls Beauchamp, as Madders.

=== Locations ===
Evidence of badders for the racquet sport of badminton is largely anecdotal, as it is in respect of the horse trials held since 1949 in the grounds of Badminton House, Gloucestershire.

The same is true of Skeggers (the Lincolnshire seaside resort of Skegness, famously described in a railway poster of 1908 as "so bracing") and Honkers, for the former British colony of Hong Kong, though this form (probably late 20th century) has appeared on a number of websites and in print and Wodehouse's first employer, The Hongkong and Shanghai Banking Corporation (HSBC, founded 1865), is sometimes referred to in the City of London as Honkers and Shankers.

The stadium at Twickenham in South West London, used for major Rugby Union fixtures, including the annual Oxford v. Cambridge 'Varsity match, is often abbreviated to Twickers and journalist Frank Keating has referred to the annual lawn tennis championships at Wimbledon as Wimbers.

The Gloucestershire town of Cheltenham is sometimes reduced to Chelters, particularly by visitors to the Cheltenham Gold Cup horse races.

Chatsworth, seat of the Dukes of Devonshire, has been referred to as Chatters in Private Eye.

== Further examples ==
When Roald Dahl was at Repton School (1929–34) the captain of a sport would award colours by saying "graggers [i.e. congratulations] on your teamer" to the selected boy.

Test Match Special aside, by the mid-20th century the "-er" was being replaced by snappier nicknames. Thus, in the stories of Anthony Buckeridge (1912–2004), set in a preparatory school of the 1950s, Jennings was "Jen", and not "Jenners". Even so, in the Harry Potter books of J. K. Rowling (b. 1965), Dudley Dursley was addressed as Dudders.

The adjective butters, meaning ugly (an abbreviation of "everything but 'er face"), is a 21st-century example of the "-er" as "street" slang, as in "She's well butters, innit". This is similar in concept to the well-established starkers (stark naked). Another 21st-century instance is tekkers, referring to skilful technique in a sporting context: this is derived from the phrase "unbelievable tekkers", originally coined by former footballer Andy Ansah whilst appearing on the late-2000s TV programme Wayne Rooney's Street Striker, and subsequently popularised as the title of a regular feature on another football-themed TV show, Soccer AM.

The origin of bonkers (initially meaning light-headed and, latterly, crazy) is uncertain, but seems to date from the Second World War and is most likely an "-er" coinage derived from "bonk" (in the sense of a blow to the head). Similarly, crackers is probably derived from "cracked" and ultimately from "crazy"; Partridge cited "get the crackers" as a late 19th-century slang for "to go mad".

The late 20th century form, probably Australian in origin, that gave rise to such nicknames as "Bazza" (Barry Humphries's character Barry McKenzie), "Gazza" (Paul Gascoigne), "Hezza" (Michael Heseltine), "Prezza" (John Prescott), "Bozza" (Boris Johnson), "Jezza" (Jeremy Clarkson), "Wozza" (Antony Worrall Thompson), "Wazza" (Wayne Rooney), and "Mozza" (Morrissey) has some similarities to the Oxford "-er". "Macca" for Sir Paul McCartney and others is another variant, McCartney's former wife Heather Mills having been referred to in the press as "Lady Macca" (or sometimes "Mucca"). In Private Eye's occasional spoof romance, Duchess of Love, Camilla, Duchess of Cornwall addressed her husband, Prince Charles, as "Chazza", while he referred to her as Cammers.
