= Robert Hudson (broadcaster) =

Robert Cecil Hudson (30 January 1920 – 3 June 2010) was a British broadcaster and administrator for the BBC, primarily on radio but also on television, between 1947 and 1981. He commentated on cricket and rugby union, as well as on many state occasions. He also covered a number of royal tours abroad. He was particularly noted for the thoroughness of the research that he conducted in preparation for his broadcasts. He was responsible for the launch of Test Match Special (TMS) in 1957, having written to his boss Charles Max-Muller the previous year, proposing the broadcasting of full ball-by-ball coverage of Tests instead of the existing coverage of limited fixed periods. His obituary in The Times described him as "a man of transparent integrity whose reserved manner and innate modesty meant that he became less of a celebrity than his great ability would otherwise have guaranteed".

== Early life ==
He was born in Golders Green and educated at Shrewsbury School. During World War II he served in the Royal Artillery, reaching the rank of lieutenant-colonel and seeing service in British Malaya. After the war he obtained a degree from the London School of Economics. He became a corporate member of the Institute of Personnel Management and was personnel officer for Regent Oil and Glacier Metal.

== BBC career ==
Following a successful BBC audition in 1946, he worked as a freelance for TV and radio from 1947 to 1954, when he joined the BBC North Region staff in Manchester. He covered as many as 55 rugby Internationals between 1947 and 1977, 46 on radio and 9 on TV. He commentated on cricket Tests for TV in 1949–1950 and 1962–1964. For radio, he became a regular TMS commentator in 1962, having made his debut on the programme in 1958, and continued till 1968. He also covered the Boat Race on three occasions.

He broadcast from 32 countries, covering six royal tours by Queen Elizabeth II and the Duke of Edinburgh between 1961 and 1967, four state visits and four independence ceremonies.

State, royal and public events that he covered for radio included:

- Silver Jubilee, St Paul's 1977
- Trooping the Colour (21 successive years to 1981)
- The Cenotaph Remembrance Day Service (16 times)
- State Opening of Parliament four times (Wilson, Heath, Callaghan, Thatcher)
- Queen Mother's 80th birthday service, St Paul's 1980
- Royal weddings: The Princess Margaret (1960), Princess Alexandra (1963), The Princess Anne (1973), The Prince of Wales (1981)
- Funerals: Sir Winston Churchill (1965), The Duke of Windsor (1972), Field Marshal Montgomery (1976)
- Coronation of Pope Paul VI

For TV he covered the annual Lord Mayor's Banquet, the First and Last Nights of the Proms, the funeral of Dag Hammarskjöld and US President John F. Kennedy's visit to the Pope in 1963, as well as presenting Songs of Praise.

He presented the radio Today Programme on over 200 occasions between 1964 and 1968. He also presented Pick of the Week and Down Your Way, as well as Christmas Bells on Christmas morning every year from 1965 to 1981. His feature programmes included The Royal Family (a special Silver Jubilee programme), 40 Years of Television and The Life of Learie Constantine.

He became a senior radio Outside Broadcast (OB) producer, the Head of Administration for the BBC North Region, and then Assistant Head of OBs in 1960. He was Head of Radio Outside Broadcasts from 1969 to 1975. He unified the OB department with its rival, Sports News. Appointments which he made included Peter Baxter as producer of TMS and Christopher Martin-Jenkins as the BBC's cricket correspondent. He also persuaded Brian Johnston to join the TMS team on a regular basis in 1970 after he had been dropped from TV's Test match coverage.

He wrote a booklet in the 1960s for BBC radio commentators entitled Notes for Would-be Commentators, which became an important guide.

Amongst the events for which he was responsible for organising the coverage were:

- Investiture of The Prince of Wales (1969)
- World Cup (1970 and 1974)
- Commonwealth Games (1970 and 1974)
- Olympic Games (1972)
- Marriage of The Princess Anne and Capt Mark Phillips (1973)

LPs that he recorded for the BBC included:

- Vivat Regina: BBC's Official Silver Jubilee LP (script and narration)
- 50 Years of Royal Broadcasts: narrator
- Funeral of Sir Winston Churchill: with Richard Dimbleby
- Summer of '45: ('Victory' LP), narrator

== Later life ==
He wrote the following book: Inside Outside Broadcasts, R & W Publications (Newmarket), 1993, ISBN 978-0-9516604-5-4

His wife Barbara (née Kellett), whom he had met when she was his secretary at the BBC and married in 1957, died of cancer in 1987. He subsequently raised about £30,000 for the charity Macmillan Cancer Support.
