= Don Mosey =

English cricket commentator

Donald Mosey (4 October 1924 – 11 August 1999) was a sports journalist and radio producer, best remembered for his lengthy tenure as a cricket commentator on BBC's Test Match Special (TMS), which he joined in 1974 and left in 1991.

He was nicknamed 'the Alderman' by fellow commentator Brian Johnston, in recognition of his somewhat mayoral bearing in the box; Mosey entitled one autobiographical book The Alderman's Tale.

He was born in Keighley, Yorkshire, in 1924, completed wartime service in the RAF and joined the Craven Herald as a journalist, going on to work for the Daily Express and Daily Mail. He often covered the great Yorkshire cricket team of the period.

He left the Mail in 1964, becoming a radio sports producer in Manchester, and developed a reputation for extreme professionalism and attention to detail.

He commentated first for TMS in 1974 and remained on the programme through the 70s and 80s, sharing the microphone with other broadcaster such as John Arlott, Brian Johnston and Christopher Martin-Jenkins.

He covered four overseas England tours, most memorably the long tour of India and Sri Lanka during the winter of 1981–2, characterised by a somewhat worrying raucous cough that increased in volume as the tour progressed. His speciality lay in his unrehearsed, articulate and tactically astute close of play summaries during Test matches at home. He commentated principally on matches on grounds in the north of England, but was also at times used for matches at Lord's and The Oval.

He retired from commentary and Test Match Special in 1991 after writing a book where he was critical of some of the other commentators.

He acted as a ghost writer on several cricketers' autobiographies, including Ray Illingworth's Yorkshire and Back, as well as writing several volumes under his own name. His biography of Geoff Boycott, in typically forthright Mosey style, pulled no punches in either praise or criticism. He co-authored Fred Trueman's Yorkshire with the ex-Yorkshire and England fast bowler.

He died in Morecambe, Lancashire, aged 74, on 11 August 1999 and is survived by his son Ian Mosey, who is a professional golfer.
