= Tony Cozier =

Journalist, writer and radio commentator

- Cozier in a 2007 BBC interview
- Born: Winston Anthony Lloyd Cozier; 10 July 1940; Bridgetown, Barbados
- Died: 11 May 2016 (aged 75); Bridgetown, Barbados
- Education: The Lodge School, Barbados; Carleton University
- Occupations: Cricket journalist and broadcaster
- Years active: 1958–2016
- Known for: Test Match Special; Channel Nine; Sky Sports; Member of MCC

Winston Anthony Lloyd Cozier (10 July 1940 – 11 May 2016) was a Barbadian cricket journalist, writer, and radio commentator on West Indian cricket for over fifty years. Scyld Berry wrote that he was both the voice and the conscience of West Indian cricket, the latter because of his harsh criticism of the West Indian board for "squandering the money and legacy that it had inherited".

== Early life ==
Cozier was born in Bridgetown, Barbados, the son of Barbadian journalist Jimmy Cozier, who was the managing editor for the St Lucia Voice and founder of the Barbados Daily News. Cozier's family descended from Scottish labourers who had emigrated in the 18th century to Barbados. Cozier studied journalism at Carleton University, Ottawa, and began his reporting career in 1958.

He played hockey as a goalkeeper for Barbados and cricket as a batsman and wicket-keeper for local cricket clubs Wanderers and Carlton.

== Journalism ==
He became the editor of the Barbados Daily News in 1961, where he worked with retired cricketer Everton Weekes, and covered the West Indies tour to England in 1963. He was subsequently the cricket correspondent of the Barbados Advocate, and in 1973 he helped to set up The Daily Nation newspaper. He also wrote for the British newspaper The Independent.

== Commentating career ==
His first Test Match commentary on radio was on West Indies v Australia in 1965. He was a member of the BBC's Test Match Special commentary team from 1966, and also commentated on television for Channel Nine in Australia and Sky Sports. During his commentating career, Cozier covered every Wisden Trophy series except one. Despite health problems, he commentated on the 2014/15 England tour of the West Indies. According to Vic Marks, "Tony described the action succinctly and with an objectivity that is beyond many modern broadcasters."

Cozier was known for his knowledge of statistics; during a Marylebone Cricket Club tour in 1967, Brian Johnston played a practical joke on him by pretending that they were on air and asking him to recite the exact bowling figures and birthdays of the entire West Indies team, which he was naturally unable to do. Cozier was specifically requested by Kerry Packer to be one of the commentators for World Series Cricket; Cozier believed that the general public supported the series, and during a commentary stint in the series, he sang "Blue Moon". In 1994, Cozier wrote of Brian Lara's record-breaking innings that "there was no real surprise among his countrymen, simply the feeling that his inevitable date with destiny had arrived rather more suddenly than expected." Possibly his most famous line was in 1999, after West Indies were bowled out for 51 by Australia at the Queen's Park Oval, he remarked "Where does West Indies cricket go from ’ere?". In 2007, Cozier used a lunch break in a Test match at the Riverside Ground to read a spoof email asking about cricket in Mexico; fellow commentator Jonathan Agnew had to explain the joke to him. He once remarked: "The Queen's Park Oval, exactly as its name suggests—absolutely round."

The parties that he hosted for his media colleagues, held at his small wooden holiday home on the east coast of the island whenever there was a Test match in Barbados, were described by Vic Marks as "legendary". They featured rum punch, a barbecue and beach cricket.

== Writing ==
Cozier wrote the definitive The West Indies: 50 Years of Test Cricket, with a foreword by Garfield Sobers (1978). He was editor of The West Indies Cricket Annual for all its 22 editions. He edited the Wisden History of the World Cup and collaborated with Clive Lloyd and Michael Holding on their respective autobiographies, Living for Cricket and Whispering Death: The Life and Times of Michael Holding.

== Honours ==
As a tribute to his contributions to cricket, the press box at the Kensington Oval was named after him. Test Match Special producer Peter Baxter joked with Cozier that the press box was actually named after another Cozier, since both his father and son were journalists. In December 2011, he was awarded honorary life membership of the MCC for his contribution to cricket.

== Death ==
Cozier died from cancer on 11 May 2016 in Bridgetown, at the age of 75. Fellow cricket correspondent Jonathan Agnew said: "Tony was the master of going between TV and radio ball-by-ball commentary. He was the master of both". The West Indies Cricket Board said: "He represented West Indies wherever he went. He educated people around the world about our cricket, our people, our culture and who we are. His voice was strong and echoed around the cricket world."

He was survived by his wife of more than fifty years, Jillian, a son and daughter.
