= Andrew Samson =

Andrew Samson is a cricket statistician and writer, and previously the scorer for the BBC's Test Match Special. He was drafted in for the 2010–2011 Ashes series in Australia to replace resident TMS scorer Malcolm Ashton who did not travel when he was asked to pay his own way. Already an established cricket statistician from South Africa, Samson is known for his ability to find answers quickly to complex questions using his computer database.

Samson is a co-author of The Blue Book: A History of Western Province Cricket, 1890-2011.

He has been Cricket South Africa's official statistician since 1994.
