= -er =

In English, the -er suffix can signify:

- an agent noun, e.g., "singer"
- a degree of comparison, e.g., "louder"
- Oxford "-er", a colloquial and sometimes facetious suffix prevalent at Oxford University from about 1875
