= Ablack =

Ablack is a surname found in the Caribbean. Notable people with the surname include:

- Ken Ablack (1919–2010), Trinidadian broadcaster and cricketer
- Raymond Ablack (born 1989), Canadian actor of Indo-Guyanese descent
- Bob Ablack, drummer in 1960s Canadian rock band The Tripp
