= Test Match Special =

Long-running cricket radio programme

Test Match Special (TMS)
- Genre: Sport ( international cricket) commentary
- Running time: During England matches or ICC sanctioned tournaments
- Country of origin: UK
- Language: English
- Home station: BBC Radio 5 Sports Extra; BBC Sounds
- Original release: 30 May 1957 – present (1957–1992: BBC Radio 3 MW; Summer 1992: BBC Radio 3 FM; 1992–1994: BBC Radio 5 MW; 1994–2023: BBC Radio 4 LW; 2002–present: BBC Radio 5 Sports Extra; 2018–present: BBC Sounds)
- Audio format: Digital radio and digital television
- Opening theme: "Soul Limbo" by Booker T. & the M.G.'s (2000–present)
- Website: www.bbc.co.uk/tms/
- Podcast: Official podcast

Test Match Special (also known as TMS) is a British cricket radio programme, originally covering exclusively Test cricket matches, but currently covering any professional cricket. The programme is available on BBC Radio 5 Sports Extra (digital) and on BBC Sounds in the United Kingdom and, where broadcasting rights permit, the rest of the world. TMS provides ball-by-ball coverage of most Test cricket, One Day International, and Twenty20 matches and tournaments involving the England cricket team. The programme has also covered ICC-sanctioned international cricket tournaments and finals such as the ICC Cricket World Cup (Men's and Women's), the men's and women's versions of the ICC T20 World Cup (initially known as the ICC World Twenty20) and the first three editions of the ICC World Test Championship Final from 2021 to 2025 (all of which were held at cricket grounds in England).

== History ==
BBC Radio was the first broadcaster to cover every ball of a Test match. Live cricket had been broadcast since 1927, but originally it was thought that Test match cricket was too slow for ball-by-ball commentary to work. However, Seymour de Lotbiniere, who was responsible for live sports coverage and who went on to become head of outside broadcasts at the BBC, realised that ball-by-ball commentary could make compelling radio. In the mid-1930s he got Howard Marshall to begin commentating on cricket, rather than only giving reports. From the mid-1930s to the 1950s the amount of ball-by-ball commentary gradually increased, but it was not until TMS was launched in 1957 that every ball was covered for their British audience.

Robert Hudson was responsible for the launch of TMS, writing to his Outside Broadcasts boss Charles Max-Muller in 1956, proposing broadcasting full ball-by-ball coverage of Tests rather than only covering fixed periods, and suggesting using the BBC Third Programme (later to become BBC Radio 3) frequencies, since at that time the Third Programme only broadcast in the evening.

TMS, and other ball-by-ball cricket coverage, became a fixture on Radio 3's medium wave frequencies until Radio 3 lost them in February 1992. The programme moved to Radio 3 FM that summer and the following summer the morning session was broadcast on Radio 5, switching to Radio 3 for the afternoon session. The launch of Radio 5 Live in 1994 saw TMS move to Radio 4 long wave (198 kHz LW, plus various localised MW frequencies). Coverage on long wave ended at the conclusion of the 2023 season as part of the decision to end Radio 4's long wave opt-outs.

2002 saw the launch of Radio 5 Sports Extra (then known as BBC Radio Five Live Sports Extra), and Digital radio was seen as the solution for "where to put" TMS, and as a way for cricket fans to avoid broadcasts of the Shipping Forecast, The Daily Service and Yesterday in Parliament which would otherwise interrupt the cricket on long wave.

From 1973 to 2007, Test Match Special was produced by Peter Baxter. Halfway through 2007, Baxter retired and was replaced by Adam Mountford, previously the Five Live cricket producer. Mountford was aged just one when Peter Baxter became involved with TMS.

Full commentaries are now available for thirty days on BBC Sounds, and since late-2015 a "live-rewind" feature has been available.

Format changes include the addition of daily live weather forecasts and reports on the domestic county championship for home series, plus an end of day summary with Jonathan Agnew and Geoffrey Boycott. After Boycott left Test Match Special in 2020, Agnew now conducts the end of day summary alongside Michael Vaughan.

Calypso-tinged theme music from the track "Soul Limbo" by the American soul band Booker T. & the M.G.'s is played at the beginning and end of TMS coverage each day.

In December 2008 the BBC won the UK radio rights up to 2013. On 26 January 2012 the ECB announced a further six-year deal covering home Tests until the 2019 Ashes. In 2017 the ECB agreed a new deal with the BBC to cover England cricket on radio from 2020 to 2024 alongside the new rights for BBC TV coverage of live Twenty20 Cricket and Test match and ODI International highlights.

In September 2021, Melissa Story became the youngest ever commentator on TMS, an accolade previously held by Christopher Martin-Jenkins.

The BBC also covers winter series but has lost certain rights to talkSPORT over the years as broadcasting rights for tours are controlled by the host country and it is not uncommon for there to be disputes. In 2001, Agnew was forced to broadcast by mobile phone from the ramparts of Galle Fort, overlooking the Sri Lankan ground, when the BBC were locked out.

On 31 July 2023, TMS aired its final broadcast on BBC Radio 4 LW ahead of the end of separate scheduling for Radio 4's long wave transmissions in 2024 and their planned future closure.

== Commentators ==
In a Test match three or four commentators and three or four summarisers are used in rotation; each commentator "sits in" before the microphone for twenty minutes, and each summariser for thirty minutes, at a time. Some of the commentators have nicknames. They have included:

- E. W. Swanton (1938–1975)
- Rex Alston (1945–1964)
- John Arlott (1946–1980)
- Ken Ablack (1950–1962)
- Robert Hudson (1958–1968)
- Peter West (1958)
- Alan Gibson (1962–1975)
- Peter Cranmer (1965, 1968 – 2 matches only)
- Brian Johnston ("Johnners") (1966–1993)
- Neil Durden-Smith (1969–1974)
- Christopher Martin-Jenkins ("CMJ") (1973–2012)
- Don Mosey ("The Alderman") (1974–1991)
- Henry Blofeld ("Blowers") (1974–1991, 1994–2017)
- Tony Lewis ("ARL") (1977–1985)
- Jack Bannister (1988–1994)
- Jon Champion (2000–2003)
- Mark Saggers (2001–2008)
- Arlo White (2005–2009)
- Mark Pougatch (2006–2008)
- Simon Hughes (2007–2010)
- Ed Smith ("Wordsmith") (2012–2018)
- Charles Dagnall ("Daggers") (2012–2021)

Current TMS commentators include:

- Jonathan Agnew ("Aggers") (1991–)
- Simon Mann (1996–)
- Alison Mitchell (2007–)
- Kevin Howells (2007–) (main presenter for BBC Radio coverage of the County Championship)
- Daniel Norcross (2016–)
- Isabelle Westbury (2017–)
- Isa Guha (2018–)
- Henry Moeran (2019–)
- Nikesh Rughani (2019-)
- Aatif Nawaz (2020–)
- Melissa Story (2021–)
- Emily Windsor (2021–)
- Scott Read (2017-)

=== Regular summarisers ===
The long-standing pattern of a broadcast was commentary during the over followed by a summary or other comments between overs (usually by retired first-class cricketers). In recent years, this pattern has changed, with comments being made not just between overs but between balls.

Past summarisers have included:

- Norman Yardley (1956–1969, 1973)
- Freddie Brown (1957–1969)
- Trevor Bailey ("Boil") (1974–1999)
- Fred Trueman (1974–1999)
- David Lloyd ("Bumble") (1981–1991)
- Colin Milburn (1983–1988)
- Mike Selvey (1984–2008)
- Graeme Fowler (1994–2005)
- Angus Fraser (2002–2008)
- Graham Gooch (2002–2009)
- Geoffrey Boycott (2005–2020)
- Alec Stewart (2006–2019)
- Graeme Swann ("Swanny") (2014–2019)

Current summarisers include:

- Vic Marks ("The Vicar") (1990–)
- Phil Tufnell ("Tuffers") (2003–)
- Michael Vaughan ("Vaughnie") (2009–21, 2023–)
- Ebony Rainford-Brent ("Ebbs") (2015–)
- James Anderson ("Jimmy") (2018–)
- Steven Finn ("Finny") (2018–)
- Mark Ramprakash (2019–)
- Sir Alastair Cook ("Chef") (2019–)
- Alex Hartley (2020–)

=== Guest commentators and summarisers ===
In addition, visitors from overseas join the TMS team as commentators or summarisers when their country is touring England or vice versa. These have included:

Country	Commentators	Summarisers
Afghanistan	Devender Kumar	
Australia (traditionally done collaboration with ABC Grandstand Cricket when held in the Ashes is held Australia though not for the 2025-26 Ashes).	Adam Collins; Tim Lane; Geoff Lemon; Jim Maxwell; Alan McGilvray	Ian Chappell ("Chappeli"); Stuart Clark; Aaron Finch; Jack Fingleton; Adam Gilchrist ("Gilly"); Jason Gillespie ("Dizzy"); Matthew Hayden; Mitchell Johnson; Dean Jones; Mel Jones; Justin Langer; Stuart Law; Geoff Lawson; Damien Martyn; Glenn McGrath ("Pigeon"); Dirk Nannes; Neville Oliver, nicknamed "The Doctor" in reference to his initials and the film Dr. No; Michael Slater ("Slats"); Jeff Thomson ("Thommo")
Bangladesh		Roushan Alam; Athar Ali Khan
India	Harsha Bhogle; Prakash Wakankar	Maharajah of Baroda; Aakash Chopra; Deep Dasgupta; Rahul Dravid; Farokh Engineer ("Rooky"); Sunil Gavaskar; Ravi Shastri Cheteshwar Pujara
Ireland	John Kenny; Michael McNamee	Alan Lewis; Niall O'Brien
New Zealand	Bryan Waddle	Jeremy Coney; Stephen Fleming; Iain O'Brien; Ian Smith
Pakistan	Omar Kureishi	Imran Khan; Azhar Mahmood; Wasim Akram; Mushtaq Mohammad; Ramiz Raja; Waqar Younis
Scotland		John Blain; Dougie Brown
South Africa	Gerald de Kock; Natalie Germanos; Neil Manthorp	Daryll Cullinan; Firdose Moonda; Shaun Pollock; Barry Richards; Graeme Smith; Vernon Philander
Sri Lanka	Roshan Abeysinghe	Gamini Goonesena; Russel Arnold
West Indies	Tony Cozier; Roy Lawrence; Fazeer Mohammed; Donna Symmonds	Sir Curtly Ambrose; Carlos Brathwaite; Colin Croft; Sir Viv Richards
Zimbabwe		Duncan Fletcher; Pommie Mbangwa; Henry Olonga

=== Scorers ===
The TMS team also includes a Scorer. The first was Arthur Wrigley, followed in 1966 by Bill Frindall (affectionately known as "the Bearded Wonder") whose final Test was England's drawn second Test with India in December 2008. Jo King was used as scorer for overseas tours after Frindall stopped travelling. When Jo was unavailable for the 2006/07 Commonwealth Banks Series finals in Australia, Michael Robinson replaced her for the first final at the MCG. Malcolm Ashton (affectionately known as "Ashtray") became TMS scorer following Frindall's death in 2009. South African Andrew Samson was the scorer on overseas tours from the Ashes tour of 2010/11, and took over from Malcolm Ashton in 2014, for the home series against Sri Lanka and India. Andy Zaltzman became the scorer on the Sri Lankan tour of England in 2016. Having been the scorer on numerous England women's matches, Phil Long made his debut on the programme at the start of the 2019 Cricket World Cup where he and Zaltzman were the scorers.

- Arthur Wrigley (1934–1966)
- Bill Frindall ("The Bearded Wonder" or "Bearders") (1966–2008)
- Jo King
- Michael Robinson
- Malcolm Ashton ("Ashtray") (2009–2014)
- Andrew Samson (2010–2019)
- Andy Zaltzman (2016 to date)
- Phil Long (2019 to date)

=== Producers and reporters ===
The producer from 1973 to June 2007 was Peter Baxter, who was also himself a capable commentator. He succeeded Michael Tuke-Hastings, and on his retirement was succeeded by Adam Mountford.

== Light-hearted style ==
TMS has always had a distinctively irreverent style. While it takes seriously its role of describing and commenting on the action, there is also much light relief. Brian Johnston, who was as happy on the stage and working in light entertainment presentation as he was in the commentary box, was the master of this style. This could on occasion lead to hilarity in the box, for instance on one occasion in August 1991 at The Oval when Ian Botham was dismissed "hit wicket" as he lost his balance while batting and his thigh brushed the stumps and dislodged a bail, at which point Agnew said Botham "just couldn't quite get his leg over." This remark led both Agnew and Johnston to collapse in a fit of giggles, which was quickly followed by Johnston's giggly chastening, "Aggers, do stop it!" This clip has become a broadcasting classic and is frequently replayed. In 2005, Radio 5 Live listeners voted it the greatest sporting commentary of all time, with ten times as many votes as "they think it's all over".

Other Johnners classics include, "There's Neil Harvey standing at leg-slip with his legs wide apart, waiting for a tickle", and "...and Ward bowls to Glenn Turner, short, ooh! and it catches him high up on the, er, thigh. That really must have hurt as he's doubled over in pain. I remember when..." and after 2 minutes of typical Johnners fill, he continued, "Well, he's bravely going to carry on ... but he doesn't look too good. One ball left."

Listeners' letters and emails are often read out on air. Brian Johnston was once taken to task by a schoolmistress correspondent, pretending indignation, for saying during a West Indies Test commentary: "The bowler's Holding, the batsman's Willey." However, on this occasion he was innocent.

Concern about BBC Sport's commitment to maintaining the tone and style of the programme after its 50th anniversary led to an Early Day Motion being tabled in Parliament by Andrew George MP in June 2007.

== Cakes ==
Brian Johnston started the tradition of the public sending cakes to the commentary box. In Johnston's day they were chocolate cakes, whereas now fruit cakes seem to be more popular. Indeed, in 2001 Queen Elizabeth II herself had a fruit cake baked for the TMS team. She said that it was baked "under close supervision" by her following Jonathan Agnew's light-hearted questioning of her as to whether she might have baked it herself.

In 2019, Camilla, Duchess of Cornwall commissioned a cake featuring the helmets and captains from the England vs. New Zealand teams, delivered and consumed during the World Cup Final.

== Beards ==
Beards have become a recurring theme during TMS commentary, under the supervision of "Bearders" himself — scorer and statistician. The TMS team receive sporadic missives from Keith Flett, social historian, serial newspaper letter writer and chairman of the Beard Liberation Front, a group dedicated to the removal of a societal prejudice against the facially follically enhanced or bearded. Flett offers his opinions on the state of beards in the game today and his views are frequently discussed on TMS, particularly by Jonathan Agnew, including transformations in the recent and bygone Pakistan cricketers, and most recently with regards to the "splendidly hirsute" Monty Panesar. Bill Frindall was announced "Beard of the Year" winner in 2008.

== Charity ==
There is a tradition that every Saturday of a home Test match the commentators wear a Primary Club tie. Membership of the Primary Club is available to anybody who has been out first ball (a "golden duck") in any form of cricket. Proceeds are donated to a charity for blind and partially sighted cricketers.

== View from the Boundary ==
This is a regular Saturday lunchtime feature during home Test matches, in which guests from all walks of life are interviewed about their love of cricket as well as their own sphere of activity. In the early years of the feature the interviewer was usually Brian Johnston; nowadays most interviews are conducted by Jonathan Agnew. Lily Allen has been interviewed twice and stated a preference for the longer Test form of the game during her first interview on View from the Boundary. Daniel Radcliffe was interviewed on his 18th birthday at the Lord's Test in 2007 after being hunted down by Shilpa Patel, TMS's assistant producer. During the Ashes Test in 2009 at Lord's Patel also attracted the New Zealand actor Russell Crowe into the TMS box, while his cousin, the former Kiwi test cricketer Jeff Crowe, was serving as the match referee. Agnew remarked "that we have been joined by the cousin of the match referee" live on air. British prime ministers have been guests, including cricket fans John Major, David Cameron, who was interviewed twice, once as the Leader of Her Majesty's Official Opposition, Theresa May, and Rishi Sunak.

== Lunchtime Features ==
In addition to View from the Boundary, TMS regularly provides features such as interviews with ex-players or reminiscences of matches and seasons gone by. In each case, the narrator tells the story interspersed with recorded interviews with the main protagonists as well as pieces of archive commentary. This [incomplete] list is as follows:

1988: Islands in the Sun: Similar to the Poms Down Under and again produced by Peter Baxter. These were broadcast on the first day of every test match of the 1988 England v West Indies test series. This programmes focused on the England (again MCC for many years) tours of the West Indies. It contained (but is not limited to) the tours of 1967–68, 1973–74, 1980–81 and 1985–86.

1989: The Poms Down Under – produced by Peter Baxter. A series of programmes broadcast at lunchtime on the first day of every test match during the 1989 Ashes series. Each programme chronicled an England (or MCC as it was for many years) tour of Australia. These tours included 1950–51, 1954–55, 1965–66, 1970–71, 1974–75, 1978–79 (including the short tour of 1979–80), 1982–83 and 1986–87.

1990: A passage to India: Chronicling the England (or MCC for many years) tours of India including 1972–73, 1976–77, 1981–82 and 1984–85.

Seasons to Savour: A series of programmes produced by Peter Baxter telling the highlights of various significant seasons. Presented by Peter Baxter, these included: 1971 and 1975. In each case, not just the internationals but the country (championship, NatWest and B&H) seasons were covered.

More recent lunchtime features have tended to be more live with ex-players reuniting to share their memories with new TMS scorer Andy Zaltzman giving some statistical context. Ray Illingworth made some appearances on the programme during lunchbreaks often taking about past matches together with a synopsis of the state of play currently.

While some of the more recent lunchtime features have been made available (for a period at least) on the TMS website, many of the older recordings have been abridged. None have ever been made available for purchase except for 3 cassettes sold in the late 1980s and early 1990s:

- From Bradman to Botham: The story of the Ashes 1948–1981.
- England v West Indies: 1950–1976
- The Great Match: Various test matches.

== Brian Johnston Champagne Moment ==
At the end of each test match, the commentators vote for their favourite special moment in the match, and the player involved wins a bottle of Veuve Clicquot champagne. Examples include a personal milestone for a player, such as a century or five-wicket haul, a dramatic celebration, or a spectacular piece of fielding, wicket or shot.

== Criticism ==
In 2008 Mike Selvey was replaced as a TMS summariser as new producer Adam Mountford brought in Phil Tufnell and Michael Vaughan. Selvey then criticised what he described as a shift towards "laddish" commentators such as Arlo White and Mark Pougatch who have "little knowledge of the game, especially of the cadences of Test Match cricket". This sentiment was echoed by some of his contemporaries.

== See also ==
- List of cricket commentators
- Test Match Sofa
- ABC Radio Grandstand
