= Cuppers =

Intercollegiate sporting competitions at the Universities of Oxford and Cambridge

Cuppers are intercollegiate sporting competitions at the Universities of Oxford and Cambridge. The term comes from the word "cup" and is an example of the Oxford "-er". Each sport holds only one Cuppers competition each year, which is open to all colleges. Most Cuppers competitions use the single elimination system. The main exception is that rowing is organised into The Bumps as opposed to a Cuppers-style tournament.

== History ==
The term 'Cuppers' has been used since 1882 at both Cambridge and Oxford. Cambridge's original football cuppers was contested by twelve teams: nine college teams (Caius, St John's, Clare, St Catharine's, Pembroke, Sidney, Jesus, King's and Trinity Hall) and three alumni teams (Old Harrovians, Trinity Etonians and Trinity Rest). Since then, the competition has expanded to 31 teams, including Anglia Ruskin University. Over time, the number of sports with Cuppers competitions has gradually increased. The most recent addition was Cuppers Poker (Cambridge) in 2008, won by Churchill. The term can also apply to an intercollegiate drama competition which relies upon the involvement of new undergraduates or freshers.

== Current competitions ==
Cuppers competitions include:

- Alternative ice hockey (ALTS)
- Athletics
- Badminton
- Basketball
- Clay Pigeon Shooting
- Bridge
- Cricket
- Croquet
- Cycling
- Dancesport
- Drama
- Football
- Field hockey
- Floorball (Oxford only)
- Korfball
- Lacrosse
- Lawn tennis
- Lifesaving (Oxford only)
- Modern pentathlon
- Motor drivers
- Netball
- Orienteering
- Pillow fighting
- Pistol (Oxford only)
- Polo
- Pool
- Powerlifting
- Punting
- Rugby
- Sailing
- Squash
- Swimming
- Table tennis
- Tennis
- Trampolining
- Triathlon
- Ultimate Frisbee
- Underwater hockey (Oxford only)
- Volleyball
- Water polo

== See also ==
- Intramural sports
