= Lonsdale Skinner =

Guyanese cricketer (born 1950)

Personal information
- Full name: Lonsdale Ernest Skinner
- Born: 7 September 1950 (age 76); Plaisance, British Guiana
- Batting: Right-handed
- Role: Wicket-keeper

Domestic team information
- Years: Team
- 1971 to 1977: Surrey
- 1973-74 to 1976-77: Guyana

Career statistics
| Competition | First-class | List A |
|---|---|---|
| Matches | 79 | 89 |
| Runs scored | 2503 | 1209 |
| Batting average | 22.75 | 18.89 |
| 100s/50s | 0/12 | 0/4 |
| Top score | 93 | 89 |
| Catches/stumpings | 119/16 | 67/14 |
- Source: Cricket Archive, 8 April 2018

Lonsdale Ernest Skinner (born 7 September 1950) is a former cricketer from Guyana who played first-class cricket for Surrey and Guyana as a wicketkeeper from 1971 to 1977. He was capped by Surrey in 1975. He was born in Demerara.

Skinner was Surrey's main wicket-keeper from 1975 to 1977. He had his most successful season in 1976, when in 21 first-class matches he scored 742 runs at an average of 25.58, hit his highest score of 93, and made 56 dismissals (50 catches and 6 stumpings). In a 2020 interview, Skinner spoke about the racism he encountered during his playing career, including an incident when he was abused by former England player Fred Titmus and defended by a 16-year-old Jonathan Agnew.

He is the chairman of the African Caribbean Cricket Association, based in London, which aims to encourage UK residents of African and Caribbean heritage to play and excel at cricket.
