= Bill Frindall =

British cricket scorer and statistician

Personal information
- Full name: William Howard Frindall
- Born: 3 March 1939; Epsom, Surrey, England
- Died: 30 January 2009 (aged 69); Swindon, Wiltshire, England
- Nickname: The Bearded Wonder, Bearders
- Batting: Right-handed
- Bowling: Right-arm medium
- Role: Scorer, statistician, author

Domestic team information
- Years: Team
- 1972: Marylebone Cricket Club
- Source: CricketArchive, 29 January 2009

William Howard Frindall, MBE (3 March 1939 – 30 January 2009) was an English cricket Scorer and statistician, who was familiar to cricket followers as a member of the Test Match Special commentary team on BBC radio. He was nicknamed the Bearded Wonder (shortened to Bearders) by Brian Johnston for his ability to research the most obscure cricketing facts in moments, while continuing to keep perfect scorecards and because he had a beard. Angus Fraser described Frindall as "the doyen of cricket scorers" in his obituary in The Independent.

== Early life ==
Frindall was born in Epsom, Surrey, and named after Victorian journalist William Howard Russell. He was educated at Tadworth county primary school and Reigate Grammar School and studied architecture at the Kingston School of Art.

A schoolmaster introduced Frindall to cricket scoring one rainy sports afternoon when he was a boy. After joining the RAF as a National Serviceman in 1958 (he called it "training in advanced shirking"), and rising to the rank of corporal, he was commissioned as an accountant officer in the secretarial branch in November 1963. Two of his six years' service were spent at NATO headquarters at Fontainebleau, outside Paris, and on leaving the RAF in 1965 he developed his handlebar moustache into a full beard.

== Cricket player ==
Frindall was an enthusiastic cricketer from his early years and played cricket for the RAF. He later played one match for the Hampshire Second XI in 1972, against Gloucestershire's Second XI, bowling six wicketless overs for 22 runs, and scoring one run in the second innings before he was caught and bowled. He continued as an effective fast bowler in club cricket for many years, particularly in charity matches, although his batting was somewhat agricultural. He ran a touring team, the Malta Maniacs, and also played for the Elvinos and the Lord's Taverners.

== TMS scorer ==
He became a freelance statistician in 1966, and took over the scoring for Test Match Special on 2 June 1966, at the First Test against West Indies at Old Trafford. He went on to become the longest-serving member of the TMS team, covering more than 350 Test matches, which he considered the only "proper" form of the game.

He replaced the previous scorer, Arthur Wrigley, who had been the BBC scorer from 1934 up to his death in October 1965. Frindall speculatively wrote to the BBC, pointing out that they would need a new scorer, and secured the job. After a trial period, Frindall continued to score for the BBC until his death, watching all 246 Test matches in England from June 1966 to 2008. He covered 377 Tests for the BBC in all, forming a close working relationship with John Arlott and Brian Johnston, providing continuity with later commentators such as Jonathan Agnew. Frindall's perfectionism clashed occasionally with Henry Blofeld's more effusive – but error-prone – delivery.

Frindall was also known for producing scoring charts for many of his tours with England. He modified the linear scoring system invented by John Atkinson Pendlington and developed by Australian scorer Bill Ferguson into a version that is known as the Frindall system. Frindall met Ferguson in 1953, when he was 14 years old. The concentration needed to maintain such consistently high-quality work was immense, and Frindall believed it was his time in the RAF that prepared him for the task. Writing honed by his training to be an architect meant that each page was beautifully laid out and easy to read. Every scorecard, like the wagon-wheels he produced to show where a batsman scored his runs after playing a significant innings, was a work of art. Frindall's work was so meticulously accurate that the commentators would habitually trust his figures if they differed from the official scoreboard.

It was a common boast of Frindall that he was born on the first day of the last "Timeless Test", between England and South Africa, which became the longest Test ever played (the game was abandoned after nine days' play spread over 12 days). He last appeared for Test Match Special at England's Test against India at Mohali in 2008. Given his love of such statistics, it is fitting that his funeral took place on 13 February 2009, the day of the shortest Test; the second Test between England and the West Indies was abandoned after just 10 balls.

== Opinions ==
Frindall was known for staunchly defending his beliefs about cricket statistics. When the Association of Cricket Statisticians and Historians attempted to revise the status of many 19th century and pre-war matches, which would have produced statistics that are different from the conventional, Frindall was among those who objected to their "rewriting of history". As a result, until 2022, some ACS statistics were different from those in Wisden, which is regarded as the standard. For example, the ACS awarded Jack Hobbs 199 first-class hundreds (as recorded on Cricinfo), while Wisden, the generally accepted standard, gave Hobbs his "traditional" total of 197 centuries. Wisden aligned with the ACS in 2022.

More recently, when the International Cricket Council decided to award Test and One Day International status to the matches played for the tsunami benefit and the ICC Super Series between Australia and a Rest of the World team, Frindall, in common with many statisticians and historians, disputed the ruling. As a result, Playfair and other publications to which he supplied statistics did not classify those matches as official Tests or ODIs.

== Publications ==
His autobiography, Bearders – My Life in Cricket, was published by Orion in June 2006. Other works include the Playfair Cricket Annual, which he edited for 23 years, from 1986 until his death; the Wisden Book of Test Cricket; the Wisden Book of Cricket Records; the Guinness Book of Cricket – Facts and Feats; and the 'Cricket records' section of the Wisden Cricketers' Almanack, which he maintained for 22 years. He was also briefly a correspondent for the Mail on Sunday.

== Honours and awards ==
In 1998, Frindall was made an honorary Doctor of Technology by Staffordshire University, for his contribution to statistics. He was appointed an MBE for services to cricket and broadcasting in the 2004 Queen's Birthday Honours. He received several awards from the Beard Liberation Front, including "Beard of the Year".

Frindall was the first president of British Blind Sport, a charity co-ordinating sport for the blind and partially sighted.

== Personal life ==
Frindall was married three times. He married Maureen Wesson in 1960, and they had two sons and a daughter together. After their divorce in 1970, he was married to Jacqueline Seager in May 1970. After a second divorce in 1980, he married Deborah Brown in 1992; they had a daughter. Away from TMS he lived in Wiltshire, latterly at Urchfont near Devizes, and was an accomplished after-dinner speaker, telling tales of the commentary box, which often displayed his excellent powers of mimicry; he could do Arlott and Trueman brilliantly.

== Death ==
Frindall died at the Great Western Hospital in Swindon on 29 January 2009, following a short illness after contracting Legionnaires' disease during a charity cricketing tour of Dubai with the Lord's Taverners. He was survived by his third wife, Debbie, who used to deliver his lunch to the commentary box each day, and his four children. His funeral was held at St Michael and All Angels Church, Urchfont on 13 February 2009.
