= Malcolm Ashton =

English cricket scorer

Malcolm "Ashtray" Ashton is an English retired sports statistician and columnist. From 2009, he was the BBC's Test Match Special (TMS) scorer. His scoring career began in the mid-1970s at Rawtenstall Cricket Club which soon led to scoring for BBC Radio and Channel 4's cricket programmes. In 1995, he was asked by Ray Illingworth to go on the South African Cricket tour as the Team Scorer with the England Cricket Squad. This led to 12 years of involvement with the England Cricket team, totalling over 150 Test matches and 200 One Day matches.

In 2009, Ashton took over BBC Sport's most popular columns following the death of his predecessor Bill Frindall.

On 24 February 2015, Ashton announced, via Twitter, he was retiring from TMS.
