= Donna Symmonds =

Barbadian lawyer and sports commentator

Donna Charmaine Symmonds is a Barbadian lawyer and sports commentator.

The daughter of Algernon Symmonds, lawyer and former High Commissioner for Barbados in London, Symmonds grew up in Bridgetown where she played cricket for her school and junior tennis for Barbados. She later attended the University of Reading in England, where she studied law.

Her first sports commentary job came in 1985, when she was asked to cover a tennis tournament for a local sports radio station. Impressed by her work, the Caribbean Broadcasting Corporation persuaded her to try her hand at covering cricket, and in 1987 she covered her first Shell Shield match. She moved on to covering West Indies test cricket, and her first commentary was West Indies vs Pakistan at Barbados in 1988. As the first female commentator to cover test cricket in the West Indies, she initially brought mixed reactions from listeners, but became accepted as an able and experienced broadcaster.

In 1998, Symmonds was invited by the BBC to join the Test Match Special (TMS) team during the 1998 England tour of the West Indies, making her the first female TMS commentator. She also provided commentary for the 1999 Cricket World Cup and the 2000 West Indian tour of England as part of the TMS team. As well as her radio work, she provides commentary for televised cricket.

Outside of cricket, Symmonds is a practising lawyer with her own firm in Bridgetown. She has also worked as a special sports envoy to the Barbados Ministry of Tourism.
