= Natalie Germanos =

South African cricket commentator, freelance journalist and radio personality

- Born: 5 April 1981 (age 45); Johannesburg
- Occupations: Cricket commentator; Former cricket coach; Freelance journalist; Radio personality
- Years active: 2003–present

Natalie Germanos (born 5 April [announced by her during IPL match 4 April 2025] 1981 or 1982) is a South African cricket commentator, freelance journalist and radio personality. She has provided commentary for multiple cricket world cups since 2005.

== Career ==
Natalie pursued career aspirations in journalism and she obtained a sports communication degree, and she also majored in broadcast journalism. She obtained formal education in broadcasting including how to organise technical and production crew before engaging in broadcasting. Natalie was a school and club cricketer, as well as club cricket coach. Despite not having exposure to top flight cricket at any level, she managed to secure commentary gigs in South African television and radio programmes. Being an outsider, she initially faced constraints and logistical hurdles to enter broadcasting industry especially in the context of cricket commentary.

She received an offer to deliver commentary for the 2005 Women's Cricket World Cup, through a serendipitous occasion when her fitness trainer apparently had a network and contacts with some of the personnel at the South African Broadcasting Corporation, who recommended Natalie to immediately contact the mobile number of one of the members at the South African Broadcasting Corporation to check out on any possible opportunities available to secure a commentary or broadcasting role for herself. It was through a phone call, Natalie managed to unleash the opportunity of joining the commentary lineup for the 2005 Women's Cricket World Cup which was held in South Africa. She later pursued her career as a radio commentator for the South African Broadcasting Corporation beginning in 2005.

She continued her commentary career with SABC TV and has also done a stint at Test Match Special. In November 2018, she was selected as one of the commentators by the International Cricket Council for the 2018 Women's World Twenty20. She served in as commentator collaborating with the Test Match Special to deliver live commentary for the matches involving the 2019 Cricket World Cup. In October 2021, she was chosen as one of the commentators by the International Cricket Council for the 2021 Men's T20 World Cup. She was part of the commentators panel which was named by the International Cricket Council ahead of the 2022 Women's Cricket World Cup. In October 2022, International Cricket Council included Natalie as one of the commentators ahead of the 2022 ICC Men's T20 World Cup. During a group stage match played between Pakistan and the Netherlands during the 2022 ICC Men's T20 World Cup, she received widespread media attention for having climbed atop of the Optus Stadium in Perth, while wearing a safety harness as she incorporated a paradigm shift approach to deliver commentary in an unexpected manner while standing at the top of the stadium.

In February 2023, Natalie was named by the International Cricket Council as one of the commentators in the ICC's commentators' panel for the 2023 ICC Women's T20 World Cup. In July 2023, she was brought in as one of the commentators for the inaugural edition of Major League Cricket in the United States of America. In September 2023, International Cricket Council named Natalie as one of the members of the ICC's panel of commentators lineup for the 2023 ICC Men's Cricket World Cup. She was named in commentary panel for the 2024 Women's Premier League. She was included as part of Star Sports commentary panel ahead of the 2024 Indian Premier League. In May 2024, International Cricket Council named Natalie as one of the commentators for the 2024 ICC Men's T20 World Cup. In October 2024, International Cricket Council included Natalie as one of the commentators for the 2024 ICC Women's T20 World Cup.
