= Henry Blofeld =

English sports journalist (born 1939)

Henry Blofeld OBE
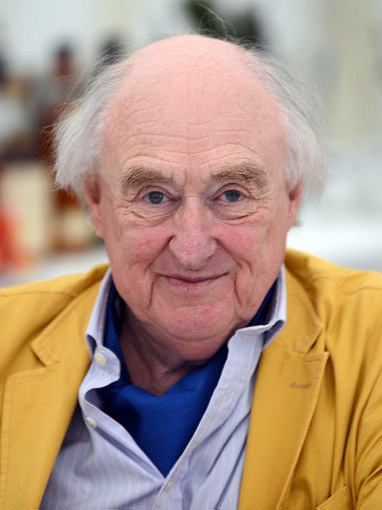
- Blofeld in 2016

Personal information
- Full name: Henry Calthorpe Blofeld
- Born: 23 September 1939 (age 87); Hoveton Home Farm, Hoveton, Norfolk, England
- Nickname: Blowers, Tycoon, Typhoon
- Batting: Right-handed
- Role: Wicket-keeper

Domestic team information
- Years: Team
- 1958–1959: Cambridge University
- 1956–1965: Norfolk
- FC debut: 7 May 1958 Cambridge University v Kent
- Last FC: 11 June 1960 Free Foresters v Cambridge University
- Only LA: 1 May 1965 Norfolk v Hampshire

Career statistics
Competition	First-class	List A
Matches	17	1
Runs scored	758	60
Batting average	24.45	60.00
100s/50s	1/2	0/1
Top score	138	60
Balls bowled	18	0
Wickets	–	–
Bowling average	–	–
5 wickets in innings	–	–
10 wickets in match	–	–
Best bowling	–	–
Catches/stumpings	11/0	0/0
- Source: CricketArchive, 14 May 2008

Henry Calthorpe Blofeld OBE (born 23 September 1939), nicknamed Blowers by Brian Johnston, is an English retired sports journalist and broadcaster best known as a cricket commentator for Test Match Special on BBC Radio 4 and BBC Radio 5 Sports Extra. He has established a reputation as a commentator with an accent, vocabulary and syntax that is quintessentially Old Etonian both in style and substance. He also writes on cricket and is the author of eight books.

== Early life ==
Blofeld's family were landowners at Hoveton in Norfolk and he was the youngest of three siblings. His elder brother, Sir John Blofeld, became a High Court judge. Henry's father (Thomas Robert Calthorpe Blofeld, 1903–1986) was at Eton with Ian Fleming and his name is believed to have been the inspiration for the name of James Bond supervillain character Ernst Stavro Blofeld.

Blofeld is a distant relative of the Honourable Freddie Calthorpe, a former England Test captain, but, contrary to common belief, he is not Calthorpe's nephew.

== Education ==
Blofeld was educated at Sunningdale School and at Eton College, followed by King's College, Cambridge, but failed both his final exams.

=== School cricket ===
Blofeld played cricket at both Sunningdale and Eton. He was wicket-keeper for the Eton College First XI and had an exceptional career as a schoolboy cricketer. In 1956, Blofeld scored 104 not out for a Public Schools team against the Combined Services, and he was given the Cricket Society's award for the most promising young player of the season. Appointed Eton captain in his final year at school, Blofeld suffered a very serious accident, when he was hit by a bus while riding a bicycle, remaining unconscious for 28 days.

=== First-class cricket at Cambridge ===
Although his injuries curtailed his subsequent cricketing career, Blofeld did go on to play 16 first-class matches for Cambridge University during 1958 and 1959. The 1958 side was skippered by future England captain Ted Dexter and his first victim behind the stumps, on his debut for Cambridge against Kent, was also another future England captain, Colin Cowdrey, whom he caught off Dexter's bowling. He was unable to obtain a regular place in the side as a wicket keeper and only played in that position when first choice Chris Howland was unavailable. Of the 16 games that Blofeld played for Cambridge (five in 1958 and 11 in 1959), he kept wicket in only four of them.

In 1959, Blofeld played in half of the university fixtures, including the Varsity Match against Oxford, where he won his Blue "as an opening batsman of sorts... the worst Blue awarded since the war" according to Blofeld himself. Fittingly, he made his only first-class century against the Marylebone Cricket Club (MCC) at Lord's in July 1959, in his penultimate game for Cambridge. He attended King's College, Cambridge, but left after two years without receiving a degree.

In his only match for Free Foresters, against Cambridge University in 1960, Blofeld kept wicket. His last first-class victim was Howland, captaining Cambridge that year. He played one Gillette Cup match for a minor county, Norfolk against Hampshire in 1965 under the captaincy of Bill Edrich, who was 49 years old at the time. Playing as an opening batsman, Blofeld top scored for his side with 60.

== Life and career ==
=== Sports journalism ===
Blofeld took a job at the merchant bank Robert Benson Lonsdale for three years, but it was not to his taste and he drifted into sports journalism. He reported on the England tour to India in 1963–4 for The Guardian, and was close to being picked as an emergency batsman to replace the ill Micky Stewart for the 2nd Test in Bombay. When he was told by David Clark, the tour manager, that he might have to play, Blofeld replied "I would certainly play if needed, but if I scored 50 or upwards in either innings I was damned if I would stand down for the Calcutta Test". On the day of the Test Stewart discharged himself from hospital and played despite his illness. After tea on the first day, Stewart was rushed back to hospital and played no further part in the tour. Blofeld continued as a print journalist until 1972 when he joined the Test Match Special team. He had also previously commentated for ITV in the 1960s.

=== Test Match Special ===
Blofeld was a regular commentator for TMS from 1972 to 2017, except for a period at BSkyB from 1991 to 1994. Blofeld's cricket commentary was characterised by his plummy voice and his idiosyncratic mention of superfluous details regarding the scene, including things such as construction cranes or numbers of pink shirts in the crowd; as well as pigeons, buses, aeroplanes and helicopters that happened to be passing by. After the tea and lunch breaks he was also known to talk for extended periods of time about the food on offer, in particular cakes, with occasional interruptions to describe the situation on the field. He also used the phrase "my dear old thing".

In 1995, Blofeld was censured for an allegedly antisemitic comment made live on-air on Test Match Special, when broadcasting from Headingley. He referred to onlookers watching a match from the balcony of a tall building outside the ground at Headingley as being at "the Jewish end". Blofeld and the BBC apologised for a comment that was "not spawned by malice".

From 2006 Blofield commentated less frequently, missing the 2007 World Cup, despite having covered the opening ceremonies of the two preceding World Cups in 2003 and 1999 for TMS. Speaking to Michael Parkinson about this on BBC Radio 2 on 26 August 2007, he responded to the question of why he was commentating less these days, by remarking that "they obviously want to bring in new faces" adding that during the Ashes series during 2006–7 "I felt in a funny way that I wasn't part of it any more". During the summer 2008 season, he resumed a full commentating quota on Tests and ODIs.

Blofeld missed the 2009 home test series against South Africa but returned for the 2010 home series against Pakistan. He did not cover the Ashes series in Australia during 2010–11 but returned for the Indian tour of England in Summer 2011. In January 2012, he rejoined the TMS team covering England's tour of the United Arab Emirates against Pakistan and also the autumn 2012 England tour of India.

On 23 June 2017, Blofeld announced his retirement as a BBC Test Match Special commentator. His last test commentary was when England played West Indies at Lord's on 9 September 2017. He was given a standing ovation on a lap of the ground following the match.

=== Outside sport ===
Blofeld was awarded an OBE for services to broadcasting in 2003. The following year, he appeared alongside Fred Trueman in the "Tertiary Phase" of the Hitchhiker's Guide to the Galaxy radio series playing himself. Blofeld has written a partly autobiographical book entitled My Dear Old Thing: Talking Cricket. He undertakes an "Evening With Blowers" theatrical show which has toured all over the UK, as well as many other public speaking engagements. Together with TMS producer Peter Baxter he tours with the theatrical show Memories of Test Match Special from 2013 on. His fourth book was entitled Squeezing the Orange.

In November 2003, Blofeld was the castaway on Desert Island Discs with his favourite selection being the classic Brian Johnston and Jonathan Agnew TMS exchange "Getting your leg over".

Outside cricket, Blofeld's favourite hobby is "drinking wine", followed by "eating food" and "going out." He has his own Côtes du Rhône label which he markets as Blowers' Rhône and unashamedly promotes this during his one-man theatrical chat shows An Evening With Blowers, that he mainly performs during the cricket close season. The show has been recorded on DVD and CD. He often wears vividly coloured outfits, which he ascribes to partial colour blindness.

Blofeld celebrated his 70th birthday by hosting an evening show in front of 2000 paying "guests" at the Royal Albert Hall, with appearances on stage by friends such as TMS commentator Jonathan Agnew, who narrated the event live, West Indian commentator Tony Cozier, TV personality Stephen Fry, cricket journalist John Woodcock, TV celebrity Christine Hamilton and his elder brother, former High Court Judge Sir John Blofeld.

In January 2015 Blofeld was a guest, and the winner, on the BBC One's comedy series Room 101. In December 2017 he was a guest on the BBC One comedy panel show Would I Lie to You? In May 2020 he was one of the travellers in series 4 of the Twofour production The Real Marigold Hotel.

In 2018, Blofeld narrated a sleep story, about cricket, for the Calm app.

== Personal life ==
Blofeld has been married three times and divorced twice. He has a daughter, Suki (born 1964), with his first wife. He separated from his Swedish second wife, Bitten, in 2007. He had a double heart bypass operation in 1999 after being diagnosed with angina and was given the last rites after he nearly died in intensive care following the operation. Blofeld lived in Chelsea for many years, but moved to Menorca in 2018.

In a Boxing Day 2013 interview on the Radio New Zealand Summer Noelle programme, Blofeld said he had recently married an Italian woman, Valeria. As of 2013 his main occupation was on stage at the theatre.

Blofeld published an autobiography, Squeezing the Orange, in 2013. The book recounts his personal and professional life, including encounters with various celebrities and politicians, and a 46-day road trip from London to Bombay in a vintage Rolls-Royce. In 2017 he published Over and Out, a recollection of his years spent with the Test Match Special team.

== Published books ==
- Cricket in Three Moods: Eighteen Months of Test Cricket and the Ways of Life Behind it, The Sportsmans Book Club, 1971
- The Packer Affair, Collins, 1978 (ISBN 978-0002166546)
- One Test After Another: Life in International Cricket, Stanly Paul, 1985 (ISBN 0-09-162290-5)
- My Dear Old Thing: Talking Cricket, Stanley Paul, 1988 (ISBN 0-09-173704-4)
- A Thirst for Life, Hodder & Stoughton, 2001 (ISBN 0-340-77050-3)
- Cricket and All That, Coronet, 2001 (ISBN 978-0340819746)
- Cricket's Great Entertainers, Hodder & Stoughton, 2003 (ISBN 978-0340827284)
- Squeezing the Orange, Harper Collins, 2013 (ISBN 978-0-00-750640-8)
- Cricket on Three Continents, Wymer, 2015 (ISBN 978-1908724342)
- The Man who Coloured Cricket, Wymer, 2015
- Blowers, Bubbles & Balls, Wymer, 2016 (ISBN 978-1908724434)
- Over and Out: My Innings of a Lifetime with Test Match Special, Hodder & Stoughton, 2017 (ISBN 978-1473670914)
- My A-Z of Cricket: A Personal Celebration of Our Glorious Game, Hodder & Stoughton, 2019
- Ten to Win . . . And the Last Man In: My Pick of Test Match Cliffhangers, Hodder & Stoughton, 2022 (ISBN 978-1529359954)
- Sharing My Love of Cricket: Playing the Game and Spreading the Word, Hodder & Stoughton, 2024 (ISBN 978-1399733250)
