= Michael Robinson (cricketer) =

Australian cricketer

Personal information
- Full name: Michael Barrett Robinson
- Born: 24 March 1967 (age 59); Maffra, Victoria, Australia
- Batting: Left-handed
- Role: Wicket-keeper

Domestic team information
- Years: Team
- 1998: ACT Comets

Career statistics
Competition	List A
Matches	3
Runs scored	11
Batting average	5.50
100s/50s	0/0
Top score	6
Catches/stumpings	3/0
- Source: CricketArchive, 3 February 2023

Michael Barrett Robinson (born 24 March 1967) is a former cricketer who played List A cricket for the ACT Comets in the Mercantile Mutual Cup.

A wicket-keeper, Robinson played a match against the touring West Indian side in Toowoomba in 1996/97, as a member of an Australian Country XI. He top scored for his team with 50 not out, from seventh in the batting order.

In the 1998/99 Australian domestic season, he appeared in three matches one day matches for the Comets, which included a win over Tasmania at Manuka Oval.
