= Ken Ablack =

Trinidadian cricketer and broadcaster

Cricket information
- Batting: Right-handed
- Bowling: Slow left arm orthodox

Career statistics
Competition	First-class
Matches	3
Runs scored	24
Batting average	12
100s/50s	0/0
Top score	16
Balls bowled	414
Wickets	6
Bowling average	36.66
5 wickets in innings	0
10 wickets in match	0
Best bowling	3/32
Catches/stumpings	0/–
- Source: CricketArchive, 22 May 2022

Robert Kenneth Ablack (5 January 1919 – 15 December 2010) was a Trinidadian broadcaster and first class cricketer.

== Career ==
Born in Port of Spain, Trinidad he was a left-arm orthodox spinner who appeared for Northamptonshire County Cricket Club between 1946 and 1949. Ablack also appeared for a West Indies XI in 1944 and for Learie Constantine's XI in 1944 and 1945. He played regularly for UK-based team West Indies Wanderers. His best bowling, three wickets for 32 runs (3/32), came against Glamorgan, a game in which he recorded match figures of 5/68.

Ablack later became a producer for BBC Overseas Service and a BBC cricket commentator, becoming a member of the first Test Match Special broadcast team. In 1962 he left the United Kingdom and returned to Trinidad and Tobago, where he resided up until his death in 2010.
