= Arthur Wrigley =

English cricket scorer (1912–1965)

- Born: January 25, 1912; Heaton Moor, Cheshire, England
- Died: October 30, 1965 (aged 53)
- Occupations: Cricket scorer, Statistician
- Years active: 1934–1965
- Known for: First scorer for BBC radio cricket commentary

Arthur Neville Wrigley (25 January 1912 – 30 October 1965) was an English cricket Scorer and statistician. He was the first scorer for BBC radio cricket commentary.

Arthur Wrigley was born in Heaton Moor, Cheshire, and after attending Heaton Moor College he became an accountant with a firm in Manchester. Successful in club cricket as a right-arm leg-spin bowler, he joined the Lancashire County Cricket Club ground staff in 1934, though he never played in a first-class match. His career with the BBC began that same season when, after a request by commentator Howard Marshall for a scorer, Lancashire offered his services for the England-Australia Test at Old Trafford. However, it was not until after the Second World War that a scorer was regularly employed as a member of the BBC radio team.

Wrigley played a few non-first-class matches for Lancashire during the war, and also played for Stockport in the Central Lancashire League and as a professional for several minor clubs. He served as a navigator with RAF Bomber Command during the war. From 1950 until his death, Wrigley scored for the BBC in most home Tests, including for Test Match Special when that programme began in 1957. He was one of the first scorers to adopt more systematic, informative and reliable methods of scoring.

When not working for the BBC, he continued to practise as an accountant. His magnum opus came out in 1965, the hefty The Book of Test Cricket: 1876-1964 (Epworth Press, Edinburgh, 1965, 752 pages), in which he gave full scores and statistics of all 565 Tests that had been played between 1877 and 1964. He intended to prepare subsequent editions to keep the book up to date, but died suddenly at Stockport aged fifty-three a few weeks after the book was published.
