= Sri Lankan cricket team in England in 1979 =

The Sri Lankan cricket team toured England from May to July during the 1979 English domestic cricket season. The team spent most of its time in England, but also played in one match in Ireland and one in Scotland.

Sri Lanka, captained by Anura Tennekoon, played 10 matches on the tour, but only won once, against Oxford University Cricket Club in two days. Apart from losses to Nottinghamshire County Cricket Club over 3 days and Leicestershire County Cricket Club in a 55-overs one-day match, all of the other matches were drawn.

Sti Lanka played 3-day matches against 6 county cricket teams - Nottinghamshire County Cricket Club, Derbyshire County Cricket Club, Kent County Cricket Club, Worcestershire County Cricket Club, Glamorgan County Cricket Club and Sussex County Cricket Club; Nottinghamshire won by 10 wickets, and all of the other matches were drawn. Sri Lanka also played a 55-over one-day match against Leicestershire County Cricket Club, which Leicestershire won by 4 wickets; a 2-day match against Oxford University, which Sri Lanka won by an innings and 86 runs; and 3-day international matches against Ireland in Eglinton and against Scotland in Glasgow, both drawn.

== External sources ==
- CricketArchive tour summary

== Annual reviews ==
- Playfair Cricket Annual 1980
- Wisden Cricketers' Almanack 1980
