= Brian Johnston =

BBC cricket commentator (1912–1994)

Brian Johnston CBE MC
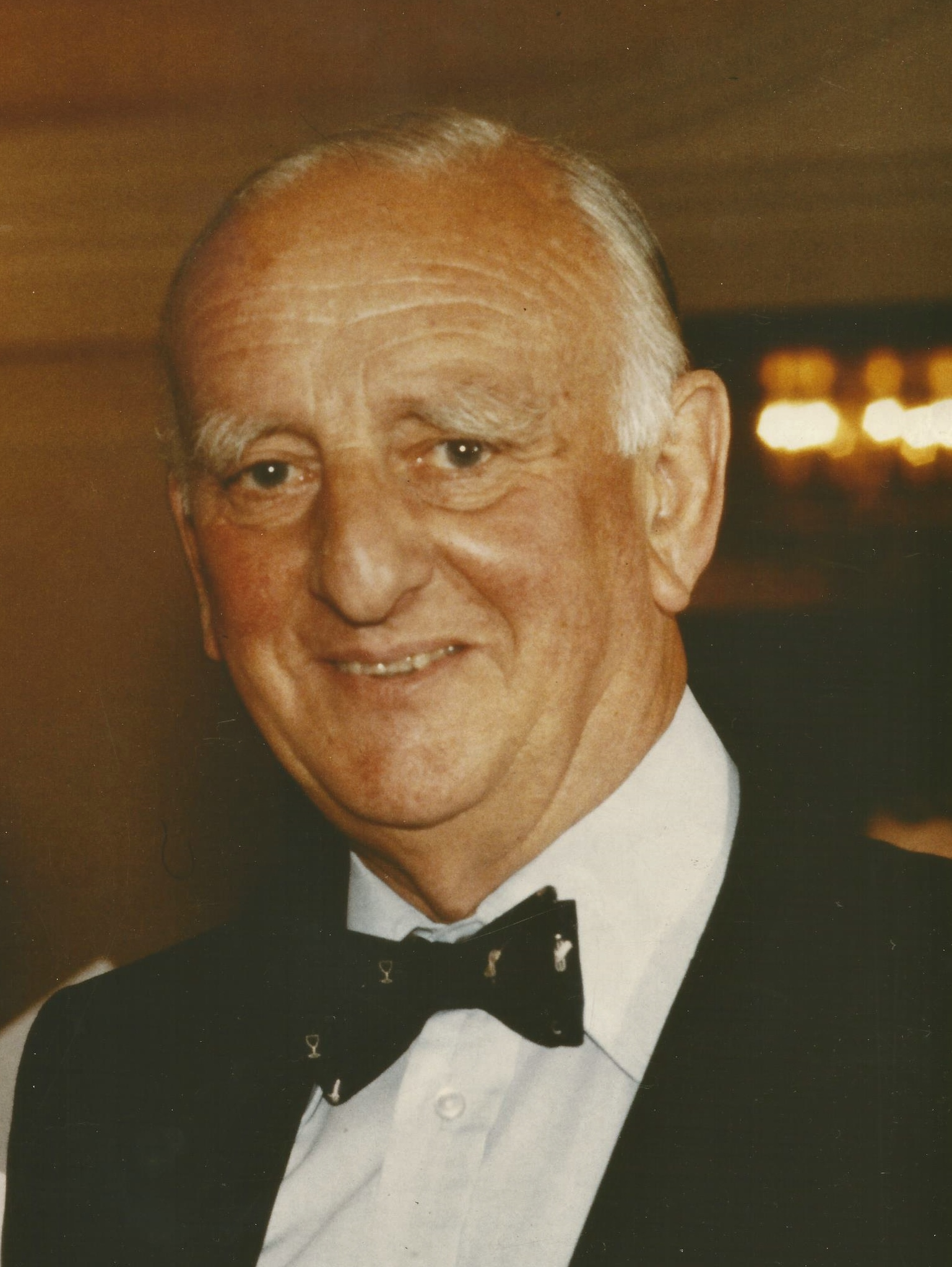
- Born: Brian Alexander Johnston; 24 June 1912; Little Berkhamsted, Hertfordshire, England
- Died: 5 January 1994 (aged 81); Westminster, London, England
- Other name: Johnners
- Occupations: Radio commentator; author; television personality
- Years active: 1946–1993
- Known for: BBC cricket commentator
- Spouse: Pauline Tozer
- Children: 5

Brian Alexander Johnston CBE MC (24 June 1912 – 5 January 1994), nicknamed Johnners, was a British cricket commentator, author, and television presenter. He was most prominently associated with the BBC during a career which lasted from 1946 until his death in January 1994.

== Early life ==
Brian Alexander Johnston was born on Monday, 24 June 1912 at the Old Rectory, Little Berkhamsted, Hertfordshire, the youngest of four children (elder siblings were Anne, Michael and Christopher). His paternal grandfather, Reginald Eden Johnston, had been Governor of the Bank of England between 1909 and 1911. The World War II airborne division commander Frederick 'Boy' Browning was his first cousin. On 27 August 1922, his father, Lieutenant-Colonel Charles Evelyn Johnston, DSO, MC, who managed the family coffee business, drowned at Widemouth Sands near Bude, Cornwall at the age of 44. In 1924, his mother married one of her husband's military colleagues, Captain Marcus Scully, who became his stepfather. After the marriage ended in divorce, she reverted to her original married name.

== Education ==
Johnston was educated at Temple Grove Preparatory School (1920–25) and then at Eton (1925–31), where he played cricket for the school's 2nd XI. He subsequently went on to New College, Oxford (1931–34), where he graduated with a third in History in 1934. At Oxford he was a keen cricketer, keeping wicket for his college team, Oxford Authentics, and also for the Eton Ramblers and I Zingari, but he never managed to progress to the Varsity side.

== Pre-war employment ==
After Oxford, Johnston joined the family's coffee business, where he worked until 1939, but admitted years later that he had little interest or liking for the work. After a year at head office in the City of London, he was transferred to the Hamburg office in 1935, as Germany was an important market for Brazilian coffee.

The following year, he travelled to Santos, Brazil, where he worked in the company office for 18 months. However, in 1938, he was struck down with an acute neurological condition and had to return to London. After several months' convalescence he returned to the City office in October but resigned the following year to join the army on the outbreak of the Second World War.

== Second World War ==
In September 1939, Johnston joined the 2nd Battalion Grenadier Guards, and was sent for officer training to the Royal Military College, Sandhurst. Following this, he was posted to the Grenadiers Training Battalion, based at Windsor, in the spring of 1940, where he served as a Technical Adjutant. His unit was due to join the British Expeditionary Force in France during May, but these plans were overtaken by the retreat from Dunkirk. He remained stationed in the United Kingdom until the invasion of Europe in the summer of 1944, when his battalion landed at Arromanches on the Normandy coast some three weeks after D Day. In the winter of 1944 and early spring of 1945, Johnston and his armoured division were in the thick of the allied advance, crossing the Rhine and fighting their way up to Bremen and Hamburg. He was later awarded the Military Cross in 1946 for his actions as technical adjutant after the battalion crossed the Rhine. Tanks were frequently stranded in the marshy ground and he was responsible for recovering these, and battle-damaged tanks, often under fire.

== BBC career ==
Brian Johnston joined the BBC in January 1946 and began his cricket commentating career at Lord's for BBC Television in June 1946 at the England v India Test match.

=== General light entertainment ===
In these early years, Johnston was an occasional presenter of other BBC shows, including Come Dancing and All Your Own. Between 1948 and 1952, Johnston presented a live broadcast segment Let's Go Somewhere as part of the Saturday night radio series In Town Tonight. In some he stayed alone in the Chamber of Horrors, rode a circus horse, lay under a passing train, was hauled out of the sea by a helicopter and was attacked by a police dog.

He was also part of the radio commentating team for major state occasions such as the funeral of King George VI in 1952, the Coronation of Queen Elizabeth II in 1953, the Sovereign's annual birthday parade, the annual El Alamein reunion and in due course the royal weddings of Princess Margaret, Princess Anne and the Prince of Wales. He also appeared on other radio programmes such as Sporting Chance, Treble Chance, Twenty Questions, Married To Fame, Hancock's Half Hour and occasionally as an outside broadcast interviewer for the Today programme.

=== Cricket commentator ===
Johnston became a regular member of the TV commentary team and, in addition, became BBC cricket correspondent in 1963. In that year he also met and mentored his future TMS colleague Christopher Martin-Jenkins, who sought his advice about how to become a cricket commentator while still at school. From 1965 onwards Johnston split his commentary duties between television (three Tests) and radio (two Tests) each summer. In 1970 Johnston was dropped from the TV commentary team and he retired from the BBC two years later on his sixtieth birthday. However, he continued to appear in a freelance capacity as a member of the team for the radio broadcasts, Test Match Special (TMS) for the next 22 years. Johnston was responsible for a number of the TMS traditions, including the creation, often using the so-called Oxford "-er", of the nicknames of fellow commentators (for example, Jonathan Agnew is still known as "Aggers", Henry Blofeld as "Blowers", and the late Bill Frindall ("the Bearded Wonder") as "Bearders"). He once complained on air that he had missed his cake at tea during one match, and he was subsequently inundated with cakes from listeners. Even decades after Johnston's death, the TMS team has continued to receive cakes from listeners ever since.

=== Down Your Way ===
In 1972, he was asked to stand in as the host of the long-running Sunday evening radio programme Down Your Way (first broadcast in 1946) when Franklin Engelmann, who had hosted the programme since 1953, died very suddenly. He went on to host a further ten editions before leaving to commence his last full-time summer as the BBC cricket correspondent. He was compulsorily retired from the BBC in September of that year having reached his 60th birthday. He was then contracted in a freelance capacity to host Down Your Way on a permanent basis since four other hosts trialled over the summer had proved to be less popular than him. He went on to present this programme for 15 years before bowing out on his 733rd show (equalling Engelmann's tenure) in May 1987 just before his 75th birthday. The final show featured Lord's Cricket Ground and included an interview with his old friend Denis Compton. A valedictory photograph was taken showing Johnston standing in front of the Lord's scoreboard, which showed 733 under the icon of Last Man to commemorate the event.

Thereafter the programme continued to be broadcast for a further five years, with a different celebrity host every week, before it was finally taken off the air in 1992.

=== Commentary humour ===
Johnston was renowned for his on-air schoolboy humour and puns. In one incident during a Test match at the Oval in August 1991, Jonathan Agnew suggested that when Ian Botham was out hit wicket, trying to hurdle the stumps, it was because he had failed to "get his leg over" (a British slang term meaning to have sex; Botham's sexual exploits had attracted national attention). Johnston carried on commentating and giggling for 30 seconds before dissolving into helpless laughter.

Johnston's love for practical jokes was routinely evident. Due to the near-endless supply of cakes, his favourite one was to ask people questions on-air after they had taken a slab of cake into their mouth and before they could reply.

In one broadcast, Johnston stated of South African cricketer Peter Pollock, who had broken his ankle: "He’s obviously in great pain. It’s especially bad luck as he is here on his honeymoon with his pretty young wife. Still, he’ll probably be all right tomorrow if he sticks it up tonight." "Sticks it up" could be interpreted either as using crutches or as having sex.

Among his other gaffes were: "There's Neil Harvey standing at leg slip with his legs wide apart, waiting for a tickle", which he uttered when Harvey was representing Australia at the Headingley Test in 1961.

Johnston is reputed to have said "The bowler's Holding; the batsman's Willey" while commentating, which supposedly occurred when Michael Holding of the West Indies was bowling to Peter Willey of England in a Test match at The Oval in 1976. This is now considered apocryphal; Johnston claimed not to have noticed saying anything odd during the match, and that he was only alerted to his gaffe by a letter from "a lady" named "Miss Mainpiece". According to Christopher Martin-Jenkins, his Cricinfo biography, and the biography by Johnston's son Barry, Johnston never actually made the remark. Barry Johnston says "It was too good a pun to resist ... but Brian never actually said that he had spoken the words on air." Holding himself has expressed his doubt about the phrase ever being said, pointing out that no recording of it exists. Henry Blofeld and former TMS Producer Peter Baxter have also said that Johnston is unlikely to have said it, noting that attempts were made to find the recording to play at Johnston's funeral, but these were unsuccessful.

== Apartheid in South Africa ==
During 1970 and 1983, Johnston said that he disapproved of the boycotts of South Africa by England cricket teams as he believed that sport and politics should not be mixed. He had disagreements with John Arlott who backed the boycotts. Apartheid was ended shortly after Johnston's death.

== Other TV and film work ==
Johnston variously presented and participated in a wide range of BBC radio and television programmes. These included the Royal Command Performance of The Good Life in 1978. Johnston was also one of the presenters of the Channel 4 magazine programme for the over sixties for several years Years Ahead along with Robert Dougall, Zena Skinner and Paul Lewis. He appeared as himself in the 1952 British film Derby Day. In 1989 he lent his famous voice in the tenth episode of Inspector Morse.

He was the subject of This Is Your Life in 1982 when he was surprised by Eamonn Andrews in London's Sloane Square.

== One-man live performances ==
Johnston was a great fan of the British Music Hall and revelled in its often mildly risqué "schoolboy humour". An Evening with Johnners, a one-man show that he performed towards the end of his life, was recorded and released, and reached number 46 on the UK Albums Chart in March 1994, two months after his death.

== Personal life ==
On 22 April 1948 Johnston married Pauline Tozer, sister of his former army colleague Gordon. They had five children: Barry, Clare, Andrew, Ian and Joanna. His youngest daughter, Joanna, was born with Down's syndrome. Pauline died in Sonning, Berkshire in September 2013 at the age of 90.

Johnston was appointed OBE in 1983 and CBE in 1991.

== Death ==
In the Autumn of 1993, Johnston undertook a series of UK theatre tours, entertaining live audiences as a raconteur. On the morning of 2 December 1993, whilst in a taxi going to Paddington station en route to Bristol where he was due to fill a speaking engagement, he suffered a massive heart attack. The taxi took Johnston to the nearest hospital, Maida Vale, where he was revived at the hospital entrance, having suffered a cardiac arrest. He was then transferred to St Mary's Hospital, Paddington, where he remained until 14 December when he was transferred to the King Edward VII Hospital for Officers. He remained there until just before Christmas.

Brian Johnston died on 5 January 1994, at the King Edward VII Hospital for Officers in Marylebone, London, having been admitted the previous day. The Daily Telegraph described him as "the greatest natural broadcaster of them all", and British Prime Minister and cricket fan John Major said that "Summers simply won't be the same without him". A memorial service was held in Westminster Abbey on 16 May 1994 with over 2,000 people present.

== The Johnners Trust ==
As a memorial to Johnston, his family—together with some eminent members from cricket and broadcasting—established a trust fund to further causes close to Johnston's heart. The Johnners Trust (originally the Brian Johnston Memorial Trust) was established in 1995 to promote cricket in schools and youth clubs, to help young cricketers requiring financial support and to promote disabled cricket. The trust is now part of the Lord's Taverners. The Johnners Club was also established in his memory at the same time and currently has over 350 members, plus a further 100 regular supporters. The trust's income is boosted significantly from the proceeds of the annual Johnners Club Dinner in the Long Room at Lord's Cricket Ground, member subscriptions, and general donations.

== Bibliography ==
- Autobiography: It's Been a Lot of Fun (published by WH Allen in 1974, with an updated version appearing in 1985)
- Autobiography: Someone who was: reflections on a life of happiness and fun (first published by Methuen in 1992 with reprints in the same year)
- Let's Go Somewhere
- Stumped for a Tale
- The Wit of Cricket
- Armchair Cricket (co-authored with Roy Webber)
- It's a Funny Game
- Rain Stops Play
- Brian Johnston's Guide to Cricket
- Chatterboxes
- Now Here's a Funny Thing
- It's Been a Piece of Cake
- The Tale of Billy Bouncer (with Tony Hart)
- Brian Johnston's Down Your Way
- Forty-Five Summers
- I Say, I Say, I Say
- Views from the Boundary (edited by Peter Baxter)
- More Views From the Boundary: Celebrity Interviews from the Commentary Box (edited by Peter Baxter)
- Summers Will Never Be The Same: A Tribute to Brian Johnston (edited by Christopher Martin-Jenkins and Pat Gibson)
