= Alan McGilvray =

Australian cricket commentator (1909–1996)

Personal information
- Full name: Alan David McGilvray
- Born: 6 December 1909; Birchgrove, Sydney, New South Wales, Australia
- Died: 17 July 1996 (aged 86); Sydney, Australia
- Batting: Left-handed
- Bowling: Right-arm fast-medium

Domestic team information
- Years: Team
- 1933/34–1936/37: New South Wales

Career statistics
Competition	First-class
Matches	20
Runs scored	684
Batting average	24.42
100s/50s	0/3
Top score	68
Balls bowled	2813
Wickets	20
Bowling average	54.04
5 wickets in innings	0
10 wickets in match	0
Best bowling	3/35
Catches/stumpings	20/0
- Source: CricketArchive, 16 August 2022

Alan David McGilvray AM MBE (6 December 1909 – 17 July 1996) was an Australian cricketer who played several first-class seasons for New South Wales in the mid-1930s before becoming the doyen of Australian cricket commentators. He became identified as the voice of Australian cricket through his ABC radio broadcasts.

== Biography ==
McGilvray was born in Paddington, a suburb of Sydney, one of four children of Dumfries-born Thomas McGilvray, owner of a city shoe warehouse. The family were keen on cricket: "he played as a child in New South Wales with his father, Thomas, bowling to him, and his brother Norman keeping wicket behind the kerosene can." He was educated at Newington College (1923–24) and Sydney Grammar School. He captained New South Wales in the 1935–36 and 1936–37 seasons.

His radio commentary career spanned over 50 years, starting in an era where the only communications between England and Australia were ball-by-ball telegraph cables which were embellished with sound effects and commentary to give an impression of being at the game. This technique, known as synthetic cricket broadcasting, was first used by commercial Australian radio 3DB in 1930 and adopted by the Australian Broadcasting Commission in 1934. By the 1938 Ashes series in England, short wave reception to Australia had improved significantly and commentary started moving to conventional broadcasting. McGilvray called every Test in Australia from the Second World War until his retirement in 1985.

An example of his distinctive commentary style is as follows:

Farnes turns, runs in bowling to Bradman, it's a ball well-pitched. Bradman moves forward, drives, Compton at cover tries to cut it off, he's beaten by the pace of the ball and it races away for another four. APPLAUSE. Four more to Bradman, taking his score to 101, a century in 130 minutes, a glorious innings by us and Australia is now building herself into a very sound position, assisted by a great knock by Bradman.

As well as editing numerous ABC Cricket Books, McGilvray wrote a number of cricket books himself including:

- The Game is Not the Same (1985) ISBN 0-7153-8858-4
- The Game Goes On (1987) ISBN 0-642-53066-1
- Alan McGilvray's Backpage of Cricket (1989)
- Alan McGilvray – a Lifetime in Cricket ISBN 0-642-17829-1
- Captains of the Game (1992).

During the 1970s, when "traditional" cricket was in stiff competition with Kerry Packer's "World Series" initiative, ABC radio's cricket commentary featured a musical jingle whose words were "The game is not the same without McGilvray".

McGilvray was appointed a Member of the Order of the British Empire (MBE) in 1974 and a Member of the Order of Australia (AM) in 1980. On his retirement in 1985 at the Sydney Cricket Ground, the Prime Minister Bob Hawke made a farewell speech after which McGilvray received a standing ovation from the crowd.

He died in Darlinghurst, Sydney, in 1996, aged 86.

== See also ==
- List of cricket commentators
