= Christopher Martin-Jenkins =

English cricketer, broadcaster and journalist

Christopher Martin-Jenkins MBE
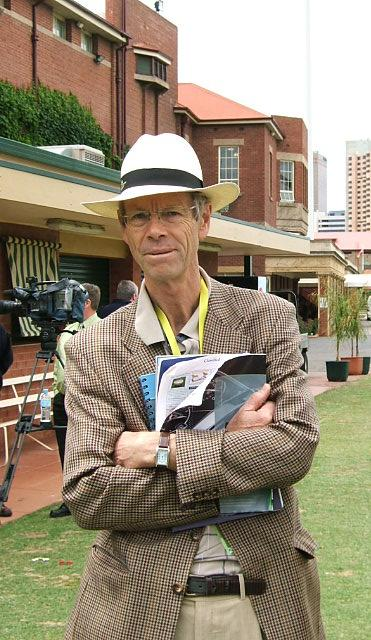
- Martin-Jenkins at the Adelaide Oval, during the England tour of Australia in 2006–07
- Born: Christopher Dennis Alexander Martin-Jenkins; 20 January 1945; Peterborough, England
- Died: 1 January 2013 (aged 67); Rudgwick, West Sussex, England
- Other names: CMJ; The Major
- Education: Marlborough College
- Alma mater: Fitzwilliam College, Cambridge
- Occupations: Cricket journalist and broadcaster
- Years active: 1967–2012
- Known for: Test Match Special; The Cricketer; President of MCC

Christopher Dennis Alexander Martin-Jenkins, MBE (20 January 1945 – 1 January 2013), also known as CMJ, was a British cricket journalist and a President of MCC. He was also the longest serving commentator for Test Match Special (TMS) on BBC Radio, from 1973 until diagnosed with terminal cancer in March 2012.

== Early life ==
Christopher Martin-Jenkins was born at his grandmother's house in Peterborough, the second of three boys. His father, a lieutenant colonel in the army at the time, relocated the family to Glasgow where he was stationed. After demobilisation he returned to his job at the shipping firm Ellerman Lines where he subsequently became chairman. His mother was a radiologist and GP, working in the Gorbals during the war.

== School ==
He went to St Bede's Prep School in Eastbourne and then to Marlborough. He first played for the school team in 1962 under the captaincy of future Sussex captain (1968–1972) and chairman of MCC (2012–2013), Mike Griffith. The following year, after becoming captain of the school cricket XI, Martin-Jenkins wrote to Brian Johnston asking him how to become a cricket commentator. Johnston invited him to Broadcasting House, took him out to lunch and told him to develop his ability and review his performance by practising his commentating skills by using a tape recorder. That year he also scored a valiant 99 in Marlborough's second innings in the annual fixture against Rugby School at Lord's, but despite this they still lost by 22 runs.

== University ==
He went to Fitzwilliam College, Cambridge, where he read Modern History and graduated with an upper second in 1967. During his time at Cambridge he won two half-blues for Rugby fives but never played for the University cricket first XI, although he narrowly missed out on gaining his blue after he was named 12th man for the 1967 Varsity match at Lord's. Nevertheless, he skippered the Crusaders (the University 2nd XI) during 1966 and 1967 and was also a successful captain of his college XI.

He had a great talent for mimicry, which enabled him to progress to final auditions for the Cambridge University Footlights, where his performance was adjudicated by a panel that included Germaine Greer, Eric Idle and Clive James.

== Cricketer ==
He played one Second XI Championship match for Surrey against Warwickshire at the Oval in 1971. Thereafter he appeared for the Sir Paul Getty XI in ten one-day games at Wormsley between 1992 and 2002, with a valedictory appearance, aged 61, against the Heartaches team run by Tim Rice in 2006.

== Media career ==
Following his graduation in 1967 Martin-Jenkins joined The Cricketer magazine as deputy editor under E. W. Swanton. In March 1970 he left to join the BBC Radio Sports News department and subsequently commentated on his first match, a one-day international between England and Australia, in 1972. His last commentary, 40 years later, was for TMS on England's third Test against Pakistan in Dubai in February 2012.

He joined the TMS team in 1973 and was appointed cricket correspondent in succession to Brian Johnston in 1973 and worked as cricket correspondent for the BBC (1973–1980, 1985–1991), The Daily Telegraph (1990–1999) and The Times (1999–2008). Mike Atherton replaced him as The Times Chief Cricket Correspondent on 1 May 2008 although CMJ continued contributing to the Times cricket pages, filing his last article on the death of Tony Greig on 31 December, the day prior to his own death. He was also a BBC TV commentator for their cricket coverage between 1981 and 1985, before returning to radio.

In The Daily Telegraph, his obituarist wrote of his radio commentary that: "Nobody excelled him... in what he regarded as the first duty: that of giving a precise, clear, well-informed and accurate account of every ball that was bowled and every stroke that was played." Scyld Berry wrote: "What made him so good as a radio commentator, apart from his precise and unforced diction, was that he came closer than anyone to combining the knowledge of an expert with the enthusiasm of a student."

By temperament conciliatory, he was rarely involved in controversy. However, during a Test on England's 1989–90 tour of the West Indies he criticised the umpire Lloyd Barker, claiming that he had allowed himself to be pressurised by the West Indies captain, Viv Richards, into wrongly giving Rob Bailey out caught down the leg side. Barker threatened to sue, believing incorrectly that Martin-Jenkins had called him a cheat. The case was settled by the BBC without going to court.

He was renowned among his broadcasting colleagues for a certain vagueness regarding practical matters. Jonathan Agnew described how on one occasion he arrived at Lord's for a match which unfortunately was due to be played on the other side of London at the Oval. He also struggled with modern technology, once mistaking the television remote control in his hotel room for his mobile phone. When attempting to email a report to his newspaper, he would occasionally press the Delete button rather than the Send button, causing him much consternation.

== Author ==
Martin-Jenkins was the author of The Complete Who's Who of Test Cricketers. Altogether he wrote or edited 25 books including The Wisden Book of County Cricket (1981); Bedside Cricket (1981); Twenty Years On: Cricket's years of change (1984); Cricket: a way of life (1984); Grand Slam (1987); Cricket Characters (1987); Sketches of a Season (1987); and Ball by Ball: The Story of Cricket Broadcasting (1990) and finally concluding with his autobiography, CMJ – A Cricketing Life.

He edited The Cricketer from 1980 and was President of the Cricket Society from 1998 to 2008.

== Awards and honours ==
He was appointed Member of the Order of the British Empire (MBE) in the 2009 New Year Honours.

He was President of MCC for 2010–11, a rare honour for a journalist. His time in office was a difficult one, as it coincided with a heated debate over the £400 million redevelopment plan for Lord's in the context of the prevailing difficult economic situation.

In 2007 he was invited to deliver the annual MCC Spirit of Cricket Cowdrey Lecture, becoming the only career journalist and broadcaster to do so. As MCC President, in 2011 he invited Kumar Sangakkara to deliver the same lecture, the only actively playing cricketer to have delivered a Cowdrey Lecture.

== Personal life ==
He met Judy Hayman at Cambridge and they married in April 1971. They had two sons, James and Robin, and a daughter, Lucy. Robin Martin-Jenkins played county cricket for Sussex before retiring in 2010, while elder brother James played club cricket for Radley Rangers from 1993 to 2006.

== Death ==
During 2009 and 2010 his health seemed to be declining when he had a bad bout of pneumonia, followed by acute hepatitis. He was subsequently diagnosed with terminal cancer in March 2012, shortly after returning from commentating duties in the UAE, and was forced to step down from Test Match Special due to his illness. He died of lymphoma, at his home in Horsham, on the morning of 1 January 2013, at the age of 67.

A statement from his family said: "Christopher died peacefully at home this morning after his brave resistance to cancer. The family is extremely proud of all that he did to pass on his love of cricket worldwide with his gift of communicating through the spoken and written word. He was above all a much loved husband, brother, father and grandfather."

A memorial service was held in St. Paul's Cathedral on 16 April 2013, attended by 2,000 people including at least six former England captains. The service included readings by his sons, James and Robin, and tributes by Sir Tim Rice and Jonathan Agnew. After the service there was a reception at Lord's.
