= Peter Baxter (radio producer) =

English cricket commentator

Peter Baxter (born Derby 1947) is a former producer for BBC radio, best known as the producer of the programme of live cricket commentary, Test Match Special.

== Career ==
Baxter joined the BBC in September 1965 after a spell in British Forces Broadcasting. He first worked on Test Match Special in 1966 and produced the programme from 1973–2007.

He co-ordinated the BBC's cricket coverage from every one of the Test-playing nations, and was also frequently part of the commentary team himself. Baxter commentated on the end of the 1992 World Cup Final between England and Pakistan in Melbourne. In 2001 he was locked out of the ground by the groundsman at Galle, in Sri Lanka; he and BBC cricket correspondent Jonathan Agnew eventually watched the action from a nearby fort. Baxter retired on 19 June 2007—with his last TMS production going off the air at 18:30. He was succeeded by Adam Mountford, the former cricket producer of BBC Radio 5 Live.

In tandem with his work on cricket he was also the rugby union producer for eight years and the University Boat Race producer throughout the 1980s. He is a Fellow of The Radio Academy and president of the Bedfordshire Cricket Board and Metro Blind Sports. In December 2009 Baxter started a regular podcast on the cricket website thecricketer.com. He has edited several books with the Test Match Special team and on his own account, 'World Cup - Cricket's Clash of the Titans', 'The Best Views From the Boundary', the autobiographical 'Inside the Box' and 'Can Anyone Hear Me?' on experiences with Test Match Special on tour.
