= Fearnley =

Fearnley may refer to:

- Fearnley (Norwegian family)
- Albert Fearnley, English rugby league footballer who played in the 1950s, and coached in the 1960s and 1970s (father of Stanley Fearnley)
- Cecily Lydia Fearnley (1925–2022), Australian scientific illustrator, columnist and naturalist
- Duncan Fearnley, English cricketer and cricket bat manufacturer
- Gordon Fearnley, English soccer player
- Harry Fearnley (footballer born 1923), English soccer player
- Harry Fearnley (footballer born 1935), English soccer player
- Jacob Fearnley, British tennis player
- James Fearnley, English musician
- Kurt Fearnley, Australian wheelchair racer
- Michael Fearnley, English cricketer
- Stanley Fearnley, English rugby league footballer who played in the 1960s, and 1970s (son of Albert Fearnley)
- Terry Fearnley, Australian rugby league footballer who played in the 1950s and 1960s, and coach in the 1970s and 1980s
- Hugh Fearnley-Whittingstall, English celebrity chef, smallholder, television presenter and journalist
- Jane Fearnley-Whittingstall, English writer and garden designer
