= Johann Gottlieb Jackschon =

Australian cricket scorer

Johann Gottlieb Jackschon (23 January 1846 – 10 July 1931) was an Australian cricket scorer. He served as scorer for the New South Wales cricket team at various times over a period of around 40 years. On several occasions, he took the innovative step of making a separate memorandum recording the number of balls faced and runs scored by each batsman off each bowler, unlike scoring in a conventional scorebook but similar to the modern linear system of scoring.

Jackschon was born in Maust, in Teichland north of Cottbus, Spree-Neiße, Prussia (now in eastern Germany). He emigrated to Australia with his parents and two older sisters, arriving in Sydney in August 1852 on the brig Reiherstieg. The family settled in Grafton, about 600 kilometres (370 mi) north of Sydney. One of his sisters later married a police constable Henry Bassman; the other married Joseph Kempnich, who ran a sugar mill.

In his earlier years, Jackschon played cricket as wicketkeeper for teams in Warwick and Albert, playing his first match at Yamba. He was honorary scorer for the New South Wales cricket team from around 1886 until around 1893, when he moved back to Grafton. He had an orange orchard at Carr's Creek, and he became secretary of the Grafton District cricket association. His father died in Grafton in 1897.

He continued to return to Sydney to score important cricket matches, including Test matches. Lord Sheffield gave Jackschon a gold medal for scoring in matches played by an English touring team captained by WG Grace that Sheffield organised in 1891-2. A report in The Referee of the Jubilee match played between New South Wales and Victoria in 1906 mentioned that Jackschon had compiled a table of balls faced and runs scored by each batsman off each bowler, in a similar manner to the modern linear system of scoring used in the 1890s by John Atkinson Pendlington, and developed Bill Ferguson and Bill Frindall.

After Jackschon moved back to Sydney in November 1904, he lived for some time in Mosman on the North Shore, and then moved to the Eastern Suburbs to be closer to the Sydney Cricket Ground . He underwent an operation for appendicitis in December 1911. He resumed his role as honorary scorer for New South Wales and then as official scorer from 1913. Affectionately nicknamed "the Professor" and occasionally "Jacko", "General" or "Daddy", he regularly occupied a seat in "Veterans Corner" in the Sydney Cricket Ground's pavilion, near the visitors dressing room, attending cricket or rugby matches for around 30 years.

He is often referred to by his initials, J.G., and his first name is sometimes Anglicised as John. In some sources, his surname is given as Jackscohn or occasionally Jackson. The year of his birth is confused in some sources. He was reported to have celebrated his 74th birthday in January 1924, when he was probably 78, and was said to be variously 84 or 86 at his death in Bondi in July 1931, when he was probably 85. He was associated with the Manchester Unity of Oddfellows for many years. After a funeral at St. Clement's Church in Mosman, he was buried in the Northern Suburbs cemetery. He was survived by his widow, Sarah, and a sister, Mrs Kempnich.
