= Fearnley-Whittingstall =

Fearnley-Whittingstall is a surname. Notable people with this name include:

- Hugh Fearnley-Whittingstall (born 1965), British chef and food campaigner best known for the River Cottage TV series and brand
- Jane Fearnley-Whittingstall (born 1939), British garden designer, mother of Hugh
- Eileen Bennett Whittingstall (1907–1979), also known as Eileen Fearnley Whittingstall, British tennis player
- Edmund Owen Fearnley-Whittingstall (1901–1971), portrait artist and husband of Eileen
- Edmund Fearnley Whittingstall, owner in 1838–1856 of Langleybury House, Hertfordshire, England

== See also ==
- Fearnley (surname)
- Whittingstall (disambiguation)
