= Association of Cricket Umpires and Scorers =

The Association of Cricket Umpires and Scorers (commonly abbreviated as the ACU&S) was established in 1953 by the umpire Tom Smith as the Association of Cricket Umpires (the Scorers were included in the title several years later), in order to provide training and advice to cricket officials. It had a membership exceeding 8,000 in countries all over the world before it was merged with the ECB Officials Association on 1 January 2008.

The ACU&S also had the duty of assigning qualified umpires and scorers to cricket matches around the world. It was funded by membership fees, sponsorship, advertising in its quarterly newsletter How's That, and the profits from selling official umpire and scorer accessories and clothing.

== Merger ==
In December 2007, the membership of the ACU&S voted (67% for, 33% against on a low turnout) to merge with the ECB Officials Association [ECB OA]. This ended a period of uncertainty during which various claims were made both about the Association's financial stability and its internal governance. This new organisation eventually became the ECB Association of Cricket Officials. The move was criticised by some who viewed it a cynical move by the ECB as a means to secure additional funding by Sport England as well as by overseas members who believed that an organisation under the auspices of the ECB would not have the same interest in them as the ACU&S, which had supported members across the world. Supporters of the merger argued that integration with the ECB would raise the profile of umpiring and scoring, provide much needed funds, improve training and put an end to the multitude of official bodies that had begun after alleged irregularities in administration had come to light. This aspiration to improve training must sound rather hollow now ECB no longer examines candidates for knowledge of the Laws of Cricket. 5 Gloucestershire Association of Cricket Umpires and Scorers minutes 18 November 2017.

== Association textbook ==
The textbook, Cricket Umpiring and Scoring, was first published in 1957 under the authorship of Colonel Rowan Rait Kerr. Later editions were edited by Tom Smith, MBE. Later revisions were undertaken by Sheila Hill, MBE, and Robbie Robins in about 1992, when the name was changed to Tom Smith's Cricket Umpiring and Scoring at the suggestion of Colin Pearson as a permanent honour to the founder. The changes to the Laws of cricket in 2000 required a substantial re-write and this was undertaken by Colin Edwards, Graeme Lowrie (NZ), and Graham Cooper. The new edition was published by Weidenfeld & Nicolson in 2004.

Shortly before merging to form the ECB ACO, the copyright to the textbook was transferred by the ACU&S to Marylebone Cricket Club (MCC), who continue to update it; Weidenfeld & Nicolson also continue to publish it.

== See also ==
- Association of Cricket Officials
