= Bemco =

Bemco may refer to:

- Brandeis Emergency Medical Corps
- British Electrical and Manufacturing Company, see John Atkinson Pendlington
