= Cecily Lydia Fearnley =

Australian writer and artist

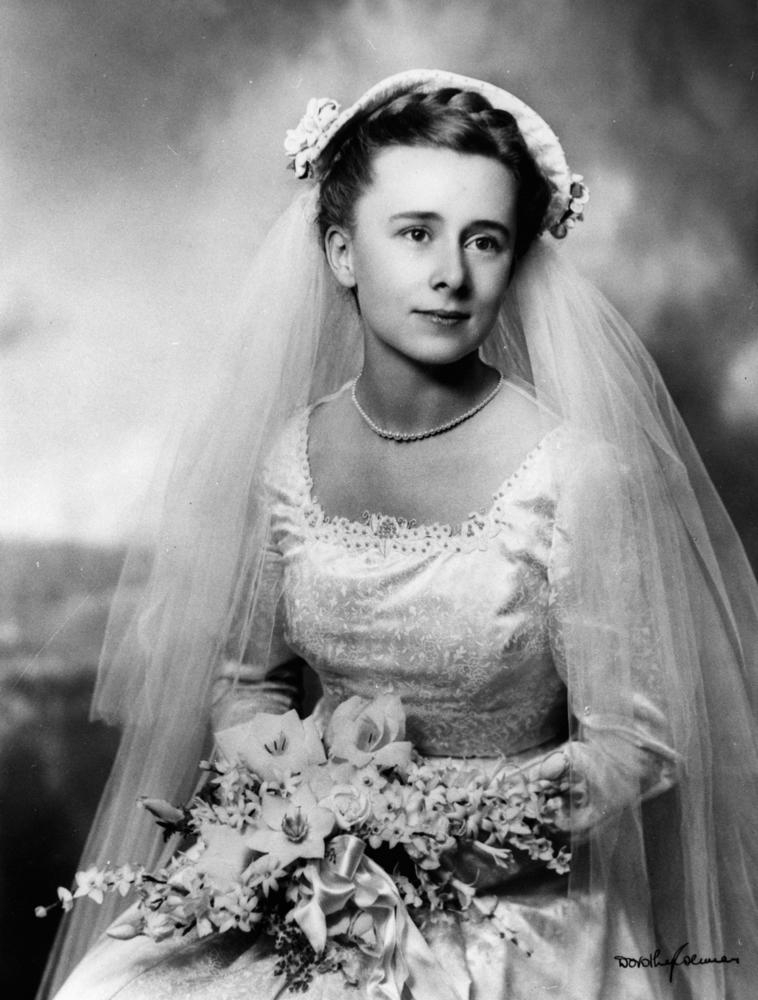
- Fearnley, aged 28, on her wedding day (1953).
- Born: Cecily Lydia Sandercock; 8 March 1925; Brisbane, Queensland, Australia
- Died: 21 January 2022 (aged 96)
- Burial place: Toowong, Queensland, Australia
- Known for: Natural history and biography writings
- Spouse: James "Jim" Fearnley (m. 1953)
- Children: 4

Cecily Lydia Fearnley (née Sandercock; 8 March 1925 – 21 January 2022) was an Australian author, artist, scientific illustrator, columnist and naturalist. She is known for her biographies on her own and others' experiences during World War II, as well as her books on Australian natural history.

== Early life and World War II ==
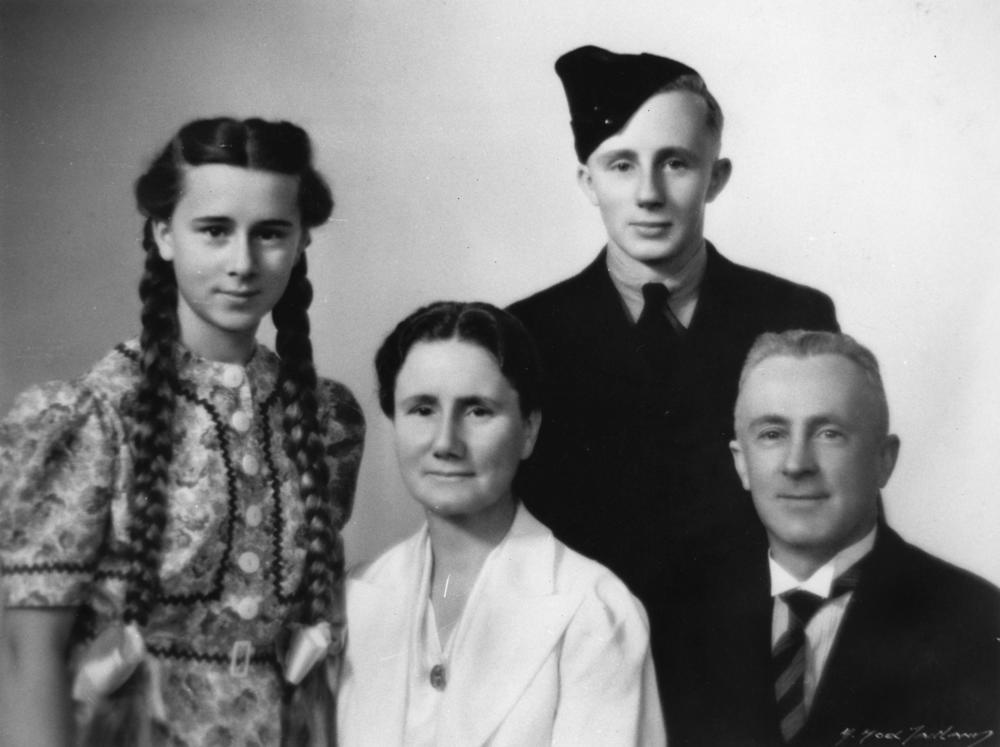
Sandercock family, 1940.

Fearnley was born in 1925 in Brisbane, Queensland. She was baptised into the Methodist church. She attended Brisbane Girls' Grammar before beginning at a technical art school.

Fearnley was still in high school in 1939 when the United Kingdom declared the start of World War II and Australia became involved almost immediately, due to being part of the Commonwealth. During the war, her father was a Divisional Engineer in the Telegraph's Postmaster-General’s Department, and her brother was in the Royal Australian Air Force. Fearnley was evacuated to Adelaide for a short time when she was 17 due to safety concerns.

However, after finishing her schooling, she decided to become part of the Australian home front and became employed as a cartographer at the United States Army Services of Supply branch in Victoria Park, Brisbane. Fearnley was responsible for making draft maps of site plans, camps, roads, and aircraft crash sites, the latter aiding in the retrieval of soldiers' bodies. At age 19, she was promoted to their classified security section.

== Later life ==
Following the end of the war, Fearnley became an art assistant at the Queensland Museum in 1947. Her job involved drawing artistic depictions of extinct animals based on their skeletal remains, as well as making illustrations for Christmas cards and creating the museum's first set of information cards available for purchase.

Fearnley authored books about her own experience during the war, as well as books about the wartime experiences of other people she knew. These included writings about her husband's experience serving in World War II, which involved being a prisoner of war in Germany, and the experience of her aunt-in-law, Anne Phillips, serving as a nurse during the war.

In 2003, she wrote an autobiographical work titled Wartime Experiences of Cecily Lydia Sandercock in Australia 1939–45.

Fearnley also wrote several books about the flora and fauna of Noosa, Queensland. Many writings of hers are part of the Noosa Heritage Library catalogue. She and her husband were two of the founding members of the Noosa Parks Association (NPA) in 1962. She also founded the NPA Bird Observers Group. For three decades, she wrote a newspaper column titled Noosa Nature, focused on educating readers about the environment and conservation. She also drew illustrations to accompany the column.

== Legacy, awards and honours ==
Her biographical and autobiographical works are found at the State Library of Queensland in the John Oxley Library collection. Additionally, eight boxes of archival materials belonging to Fearnley and her family are held at the library as the "Sandercock and Fearnley Family Collection". The collection contains photographs, letters and papers from the Second World War era, as well as Fearnley's wedding dress. Some of her illustrations of Australian fauna from the 1950s are also held at the library.

Fearnley has been written about in the book Brilliant careers: women collectors and illustrators in Queensland. She is also included in the Where are the Women in Australian Science? exhibition, part of the Encyclopedia of Australian Science and Innovation.

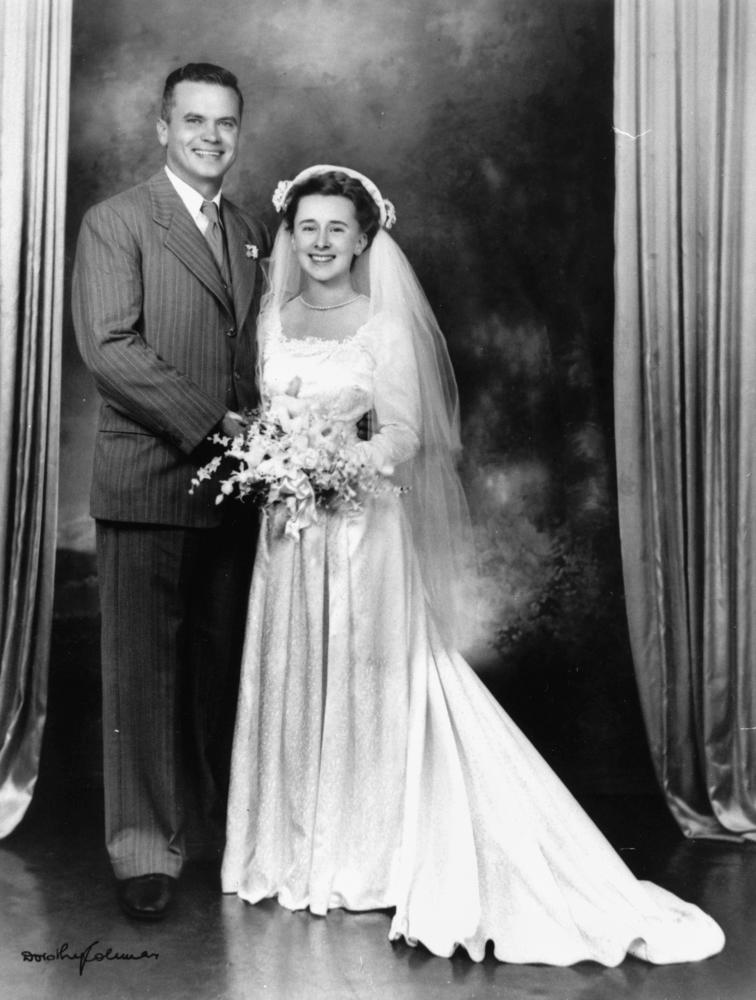
Fearnley and her husband, James, on their wedding day (1953).

A package of liquid nylon powder which belonged to Fearnley, used to make "liquid stockings", is on display at the World War II memorial gallery at the Anzac Square Memorial Galleries.

In 2001, Fearnley received the Queensland Natural History Award. The award is presented by the Queensland Naturalists' Club for "outstanding contributions to natural history in Queensland".

== Personal life ==
Fearnley met her husband, James "Jim" Fearnley, through the Brisbane Bushwalkers' Club. They were married on April 11, 1953, at the Albert Street Methodist Church in Brisbane. In 1956, the couple bought a holiday house in Noosa, and eventually moved there for retirement.

At the time of her death in 2022, Fearnley had 4 children, 11 grandchildren, and 11 great grandchildren. She was buried in Toowong Cemetery in Brisbane.
