= Association of Cricket Officials =

Organisation set up to represent and support cricket officials

ECB Association of Cricket Officials
- Sport: Cricket (umpiring and scoring)
- Founded: 1 January 2008
- Affiliation: England and Wales Cricket Board
- Location: Edgbaston Cricket Ground, Birmingham
- Chairman: Roger Knight
- CEO: Nick Cousins
- Replaced: ACU&S; ECB Officials Association

The Association of Cricket Officials (ACO) is an organisation set up to represent and support cricket officials, especially umpires and scorers. It operates under the auspices of the England and Wales Cricket Board (ECB) and is often referred to as the "ECB ACO" or similar. Current membership (as of March 2015) is "near 8,000".

== Formation ==
The ACO was formed on 1 January 2008 as a result of members of the Association of Cricket Umpires and Scorers (ACU&S) having voted in favour of their organisation amalgamating with the ECB Officials Association (ECB OA).

When the association was formed, an Interim Board was set up to get the new organisation rolling. Roger Knight was appointed as Chairman of the Interim Board, and has remained the ACO chairman since.

== Membership ==
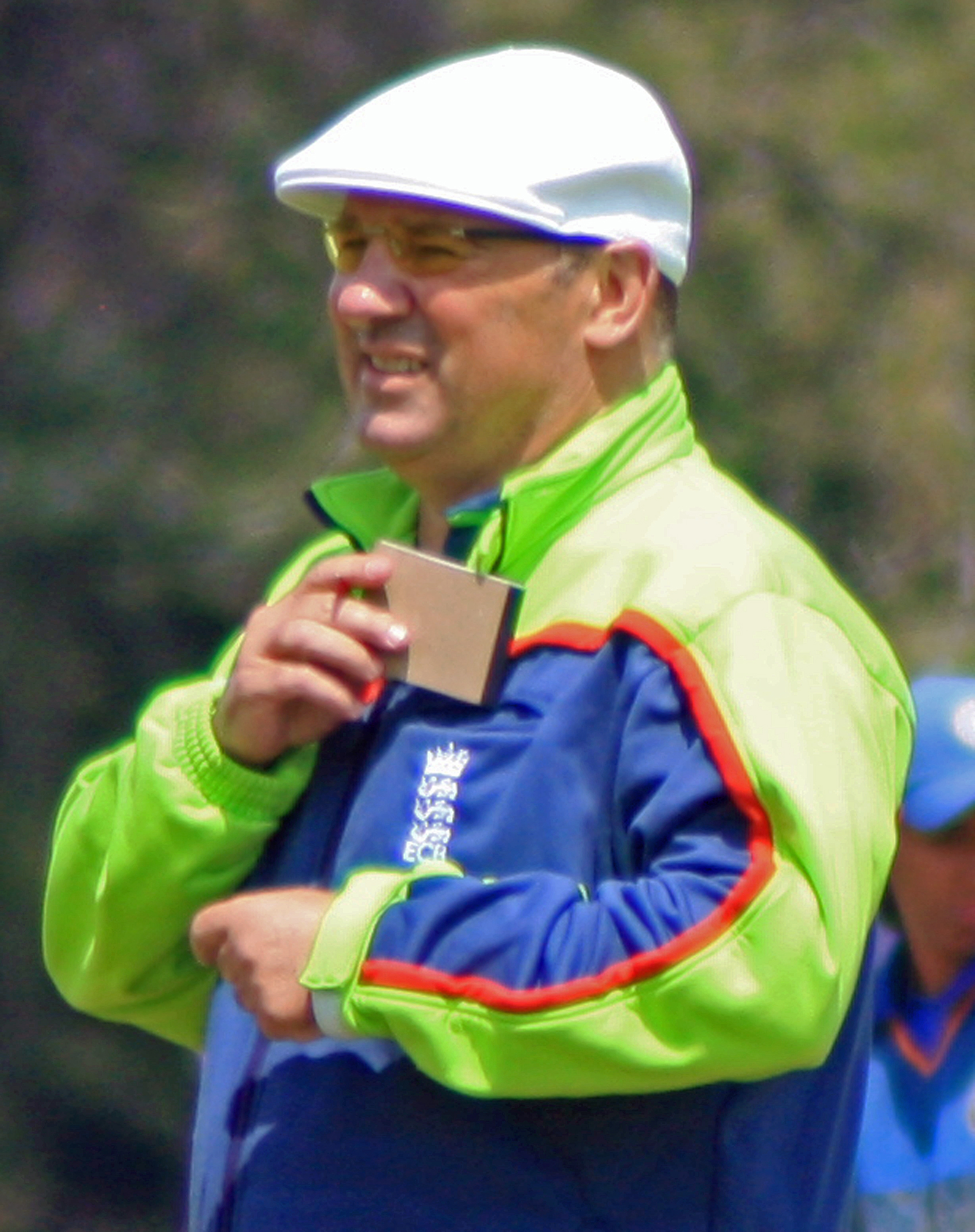
Mark Benson umpiring in ACO clothing at a women's ODI in England.

The association has the following membership categories as of July 2025:

- Full member
- Associate member
- Young official or "junior member" (25 & under)

Full membership is only available to persons resident in the UK.

Full and junior members are those who are active in officiating in cricket – the association provides appropriate insurance cover as standard to these members. Members officiate across the cricket spectrum from village cricket to Test cricket, including women's cricket.

Full and junior members (aged 16 and over) must be certified by the Disclosure and Barring Service if active in England and Wales.

== County Associations ==
For each ECB County Board there is an attached county ACO association. Members of the ACO residing in England and Wales are also a member of one of these county associations, typically the one where they live or are active in.

Counties are then grouped into four regions (Midlands, London & East, South & West, and North), which are used largely as a forum for the county associations and to represent them on the national (England & Wales) ACO Board.

Wales has a single ECB cricket board (called Cricket Wales) and therefore a single ACO association, which is also the (fifth) regional body.

== Education programme ==
A new structure of cricket umpiring and scoring qualifications has now been put into place and the ACO provides training and examinations for these. Separate pathways (through the levels of qualifications) exist for umpires and scorers. Entrants to the pathways do not have to be ACO members, but to progress beyond Level 1 membership is a requirement.

Old umpiring qualifications issued by the ACU&S will be recognised as follows by the ACO:

- GL6 – Level 1
- GL5 – Level 2

Current courses are as follows:

Level	Umpire Courses Available	Scorer Courses Available
Introduction	Introductory Course	Introductory Course
Level 1	Introduction to Practical Umpiring	How to record a cricket match
Level 1	Introduction to Practical Umpiring	Scoring Correspondence Course
Level 1A	Understanding the Game	Understanding the Game
Level 2	Developing the experienced Umpire	Developing the experienced Scorer
Level 3	Introduction to semi-professional Cricket	Advanced Scorer

A new education structure for both umpires and scorers is currently being phased in.

== Board ==
The association's Board as of 2014 consists of:

- Chairman: Roger Knight
- Special Executive Officer: Nick Cousins
- one representative from each of the five regions –
  - Midlands: Peter Mitchell (Deputy chairman)
  - London & East: Sid Poole
  - South & West: Les Clemenson
  - North: Philip Radcliffe
  - Wales: Steve Davies
- a representative from ICC Europe: Nick Pink
- Laws & Universities manager at the MCC: Fraser Stewart
- the managing director of ECB Cricket Partnerships: Mike Gatting
- ECB umpires' manager: Chris Kelly
- first-class umpires representative: Neil Bainton
- the chairman of ACCS: Andrew Hignell
- an independent member: Janie Frampton

The Board has the following sub-committees:

- Education
- Member Services
- Scorers
- Performance & Development
- Appointments & Grading

Further notable officers of the association are:

- Finance & Project Officer: Ben Francis [Treasurer]
- Executive Administrator: Saira Baker [Secretary]

== Official merchandise ==
The famous Worcester-based cricket company Duncan Fearnley manufactures and retails clothing and accessories exclusively for the ECB ACO.

== Offices ==
The association is registered at the ECB's head offices at Lord's Cricket Ground (Marylebone, Middlesex), but most administrative activity occurs at the ECB's offices at Edgbaston Cricket Ground (Birmingham, Warwickshire).

== See also ==
- Cricket in England
- Cricket in Wales
- Association of Cricket Umpires and Scorers
