= Roy Dickinson =

GB international rugby league footballer and coach

Personal information
- Full name: Roy Dickinson
- Born: 21 October 1956 (age 69) Leeds, England

Playing information
- Position: Prop
Club
Years	Team	Pld	T	G	FG	P
1973–86	Leeds	304	20	0	0	60
1986–90	Halifax	53	4	0	0	16
1990–91	Bramley RLFC	16	3	0	0	12
	Total	373	27	0	0	88
Representative
Years	Team	Pld	T	G	FG	P
1976–78	Great Britain U24	5	0	0	0	0
1979–82	Yorkshire	4	0	0	0	0
1985	Great Britain	2	0	0	0	0

Coaching information
Club
Years	Team	Gms	W	D	L	W%
1991	Bramley RLFC

Roy Dickinson (born 21 October 1956) is an English former professional rugby league footballer who played in the 1980s and 1990s, and coached in the 1990s. He played at representative level for Great Britain, and at club level for Leeds and Halifax, as a prop, and coached at club level for Bramley.

== Playing career ==
=== Leeds ===
Dickinson started his rugby league career with Leeds. He made his debut in March 1974.

Dickinson appeared as a substitute (replacing prop Steve Pitchford) in Leeds' 15-11 victory over Hull Kingston Rovers in the 1975 Yorkshire Cup Final during the 1975–76 season at Headingley, Leeds on Saturday 15 November 1975, played at prop in the 15-6 victory over Featherstone Rovers in the 1976 Yorkshire Cup Final during the 1976–77 season at Headingley, Leeds on Saturday 16 October 1976, and played at prop in the 15-6 victory over Halifax in the 1979 Yorkshire Cup Final during the 1979–80 season at Headingley, Leeds on Saturday 27 October 1979.

Dickinson appeared as a substitute (replacing loose forward Stanley Fearnley) in Leeds' 16-7 victory over Widnes in the 1977 Challenge Cup Final during the 1976–77 season at Wembley Stadium, London on Saturday 7 May 1977, in front of a crowd of 80,871, and was a substitute in the 14-12 victory over St. Helens in the 1978 Challenge Cup Final during the 1977–78 season at Wembley Stadium, London on Saturday 13 May 1978, in front of a crowd of 96,000.

Dickinson played at prop in Leeds' 4-15 defeat by Wigan in the 1982–83 John Player Trophy Final during the 1982–83 season at Elland Road, Leeds on Saturday 22 January 1983.

Dickinson's Testimonial match at Leeds took place in 1982.

=== Later career ===
Dickinson transferred Halifax in June 1986 for a fee of £10,000. In December 1986, he suffered a broken arm, and missed out on several months of the 1986–87 season. He returned to action in April 1987, but was not selected for Halifax's 1987 Challenge Cup final win.

He finished his career at Bramley, where he also coached.

=== International honours ===
Dickinson won caps for Great Britain while at Leeds in 1985 against France (2 matches).

== Personal life ==
In 1986, Dickinson married Debbie Stanger in Leeds.
