= Whittingstall =

Whittingstall may refer to:

- Eileen Bennett Whittingstall (1907-1979), British tennis player
- Whittingstall's, former brewery in Watford, Herts, England

== See also ==
- Fearnley-Whittingstall
