= Chance to Shine =

UK charitable organisation

- Formation: 2005
- Founder: The Cricket Foundation
- Type: Charitable organization
- Legal status: Registered charity
- Headquarters: London, England
- Region served: England and Wales
- Website: chancetoshine.org

Chance to Shine is an independent charitable organisation in the UK that aims to help young people to play, learn and develop through cricket. As of October 2023 over 6 million children have taken part in their programmes in state schools and communities.

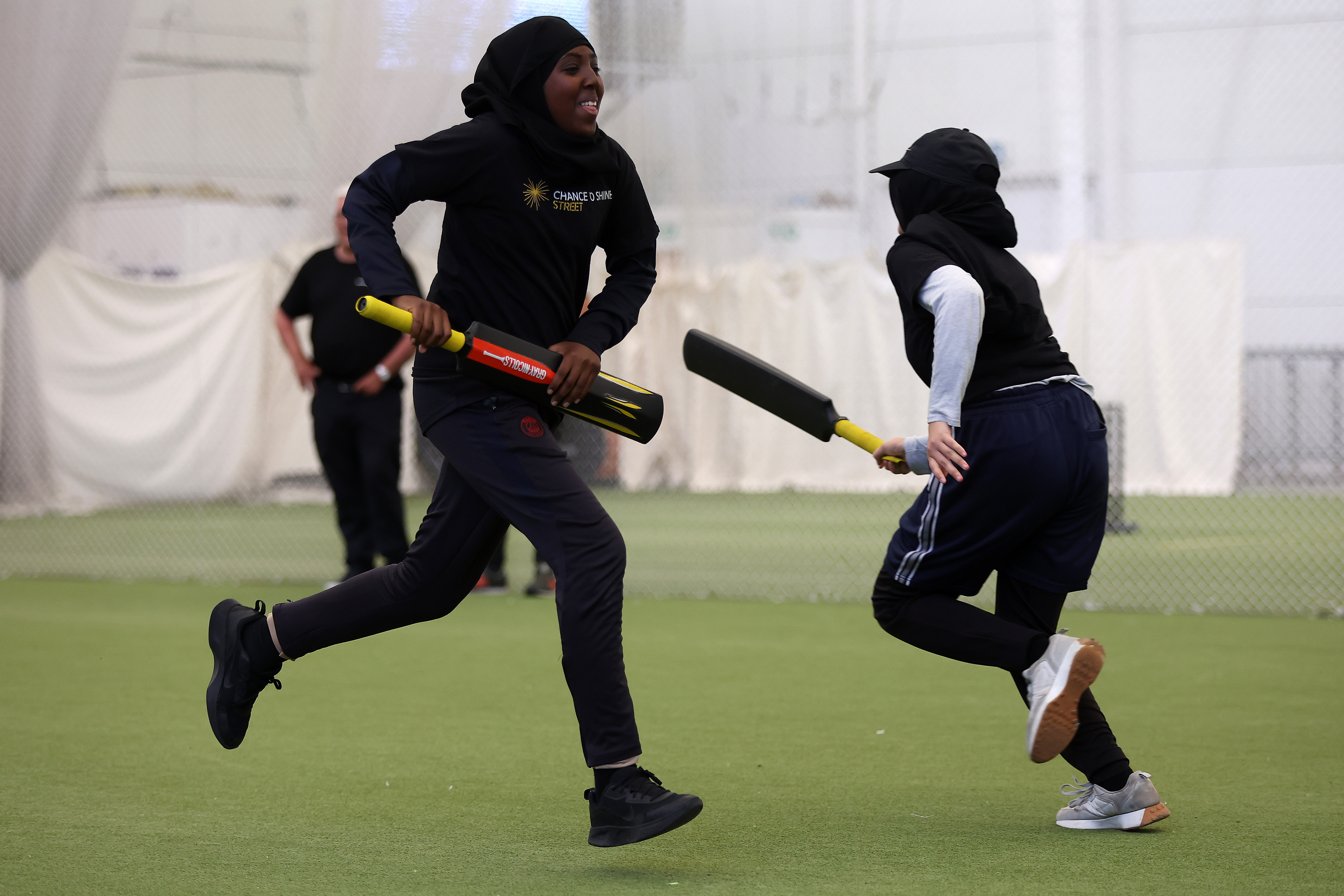
Girls take part in the Chance to Shine Street national finals in 2023.

== History ==
Chance to Shine first began as the Cricket Foundation in 1981, the charitable arm of the England and Wales Cricket Board (ECB), and was responsible for allocating payments to County Boards for grassroots and youth cricket. In 1996, ECB took on the responsibility of managing all cricket in England & Wales and the Cricket Foundation became an independent charity.

In 2005, the Cricket Foundation focussed their efforts onto a new initiative—Chance to Shine. The charity in its current form was then founded by Mervyn King, former Governor of the Bank of England, broadcaster Mark Nicholas and cricket equipment manufacturer Duncan Fearnley. Chance to Shine initially worked by pairing schools with local clubs to provide expertise in their cricket lessons as well as the opportunity to transition if the children were interested.

Before it was launched, research indicated that cricket was played regularly in less than 10% of state schools, and was only the sixth most popular sport played in schools, with many cricket pitches lost when school playing fields had been sold for development.

Chance to Shine was supported, both financially and logistically, by the England and Wales Cricket Board and other cricketing bodies, including the Authors Cricket Club, Marylebone Cricket Club, the Lord's Taverners, and the Professional Cricketers' Association. Half of its £50 million programme was funded by private donors, with private fundraising matched by government funding through Sport England. It is estimated that 200,000 children were involved in its first four years of operation. By 2015, over 2.5 million children had participated, at 11,000 state schools.

In 2015, The Cricket Foundation was rebranded and the charity became officially known as Chance to Shine. With this came a new logo, style and branding colours.

== Nature of Delivery ==
Chance to Shine aims to inspire children to play cricket in state schools and communities all year round, in particular in areas where young people have fewer opportunities to play. Teachers are trained to ensure that cricket can be sustained in schools after a Chance to Shine coach has delivered the programme.

The charity measures its impact by the improvements in physical, social and mental wellbeing amongst its participants—as well as the growth in their personal development including communication and leadership skills.

== Work in Schools ==
In a typical year Chance to Shine works in around a quarter of state primary schools across England and Wales, supporting pupils from Year 1 to Year 6 to grow a love for the sport. The charity also runs an online digital hub, the Chance to Shine Portal, which provides free of charge cricketing resources to coaches, teachers and parents.

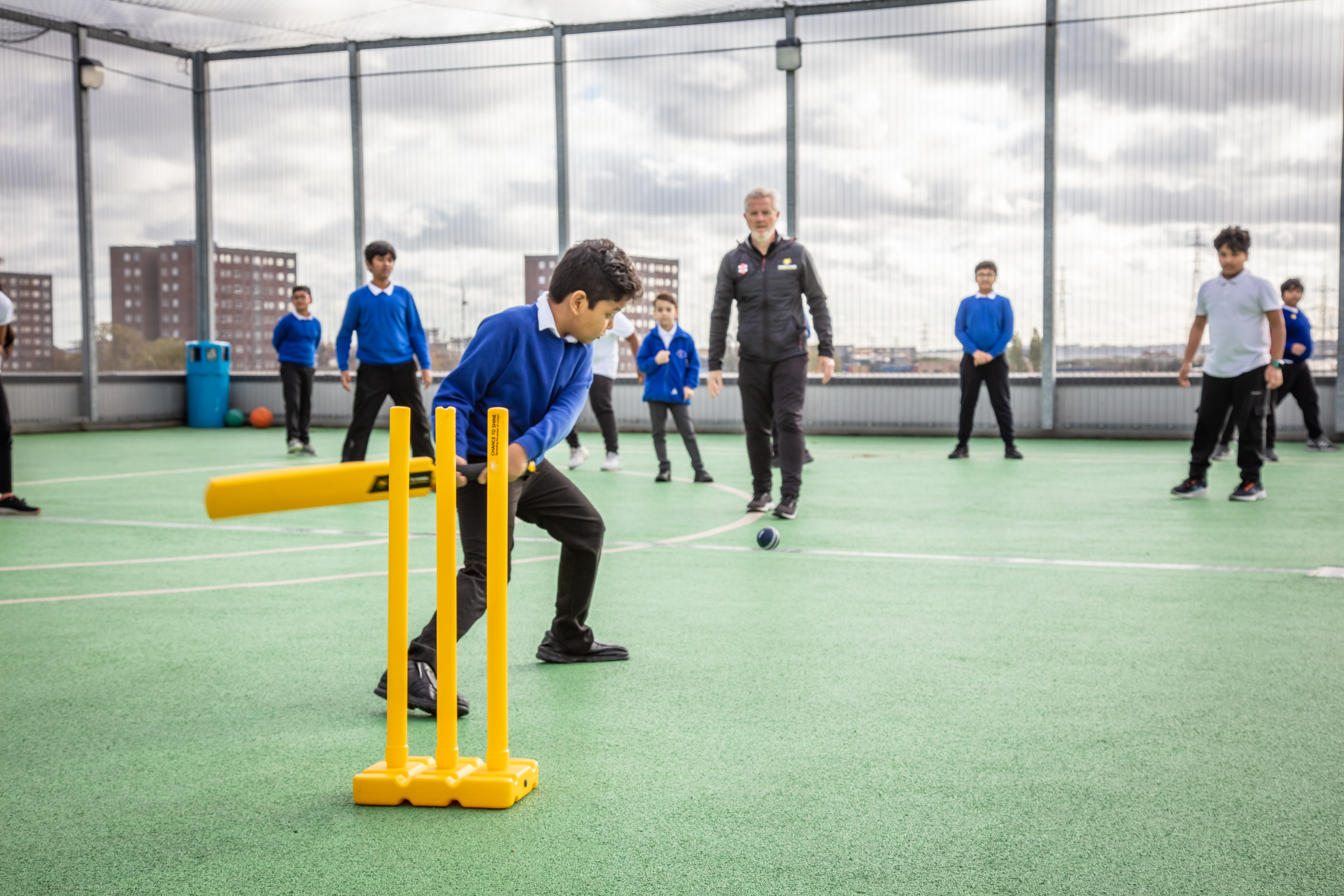
Pupils receiving a Chance to Shine session on the rooftop of a school in Barking, Essex

In secondary schools the charity creates opportunities for teenage girls to play cricket and to support them to develop leadership skills through the sport. This facet of the programme is delivered via taster sessions, leadership training and extra-curricular clubs—where pupils are supported to deliver cricket sessions to their peers and younger age groups.

Chance to Shine also run 'Chance to Compete'—a national secondary school competition aimed at giving secondary state school children an opportunity to play competitive cricket.

All programmes are free of charge for schools at the point of delivery.

== Chance to Shine Street ==
In 2008, Chance to Shine Street (formerly known as StreetChance) was launched. The programme was dedicated to providing children and young people who might not have access to traditional cricket clubs with a place to play the game.

Clubs are free to attend and matches are played in a tapeball cricket format, with six players per team and 20 balls per innings. Charity data shows that 74% of players are not part of a traditional cricket club before joining their project, whilst 82% of young people who attend Street are from ethnically diverse backgrounds.

As of October 2023 there are just under 300 Chance to Shine Street projects across England, Wales and Scotland.

== Alumni ==
Tara Norris became the first former Chance to Shine participant to play international cricket, when she made her debut for the United States national cricket team in October 2021. In June 2022, Lauren Bell and Issy Wong became the first full Chance to Shine participants to play for England.

== Governance and Funding ==
Chance to Shine’s Board is made up of independent non-executive Trustee Directors and is chaired by Tim Score. Trustees include former England cricket captain and World Cup winner Eoin Morgan and former Liberal Democrat MP Danny Alexander.

The charity must raise around £6 million each year to deliver its programmes. They continue to receive funding from the England and Wales Cricket Board and Sport England, as well as via donations and fundraising events.
