= Roger Knight =

English cricketer, administrator, and schoolmaster

Personal information
- Full name: Roger David Verdon Knight
- Born: 6 September 1946 (age 80); Streatham, England
- Batting: Left-handed
- Bowling: Right-arm medium

Career statistics
Competition	First-class	List A
Matches	387	310
Runs scored	19,558	6,915
Batting average	32.00	26.09
100s/50s	31/114	4/40
Top score	165*	127
Balls bowled	27,701	11,536
Wickets	369	297
Bowling average	36.13	26.56
5 wickets in innings	4	2
10 wickets in match	–
Best bowling	6/44	5/39
Catches/stumpings	295/–	84/–
- Source: Cricinfo, 26 April 2013

Roger David Verdon Knight OBE (born 6 September 1946) is an English administrator, cricketer and schoolmaster. He was awarded the OBE in 2007. He is an Honorary Life Member of the Marylebone Cricket Club (MCC) and was president of the club from 2015 to 2016.

== Background ==
He was born in Streatham, the son of the late David Verdon Knight, who was himself both an Old Alleynian and a graduate of St Catharine's College, Cambridge, and the late Thelma Patricia Knight. D.V. Knight was a master at Dulwich College, where he was also the head of the junior boarding house Bell House.

== Education ==
He was educated at Dulwich College and at St Catharine's College, Cambridge. He read modern and medieval languages, earning a BA in 1969, MA in 1972 and a DipEd in 1971.

== First-Class Cricket career ==
He played first-class cricket for:

- Cambridge University Cricket Club (blue) (1967–1970)
- Surrey County Cricket Club (1968–1970) and (1978–1984) (captain 1978–1983)
- Gloucestershire County Cricket Club (1971–1975)
- Sussex County Cricket Club (1976–1977)

== Teaching career ==
- Assistant Master at Eastbourne College (1970–1978)
- Assistant Master at Dulwich College (1978–1983)
- Housemaster at Cranleigh School (1983–1990)
- Headmaster of Worksop College (1990–1993)

== Administrative appointments ==
- Surrey County Cricket Club Cricket Committee (1984–1987)
- Vice Chairman of the South East Region of the Sports Council (1985–1990)
- Governor of the TVS Trust (1987–1992)
- MCC Committee (1989–1992)
- HMC Sports sub-committee (1991–1993)
- Secretary of Marylebone Cricket Club (MCC) (1994–2000)
- President of the European Cricket Federation (1994–1997)
- Governor of Rendcomb College (1995–1999)
- ECB Management Board (1997–2006)
- Governor of King's School, Taunton (1998 to date)
- Chairman of Education Committee (The King's Schools, Taunton) (2004 to date)
- Councillor of the London Playing Fields Society (1998–2002)
- Secretary & Chief Executive of Marylebone Cricket Club (MCC) (2000–2006)
- Governor of Dulwich College (2004 to date)
- Chairman of the European Cricket Council (2006 to date)
- Chairman of the Board of the ECB Association of Cricket Officials (2008 to date)
- President of Surrey County Cricket Club (2008–2009)
- President of Marylebone Cricket Club (2015–2016)

== Recreations ==
- Cricket, tennis, bridge, piano music, 17th century French Literature
