= Gordon Fearnley =

English footballer (1950–2015)

Personal information
- Date of birth: 25 January 1950
- Place of birth: Bradford, England
- Date of death: 25 June 2015 (aged 65)
- Positions: Forward; defender

Senior career*
Years	Team	Apps	(Gls)
1968–1970	Sheffield Wednesday	0	(0)
1970–1977	Bristol Rovers	121	(21)
1976	→ Toronto Metros-Croatia (loan)	1	(1)
1976	→ Miami Toros (loan)	20	(3)
1977–1978	Fort Lauderdale Strikers	22	(2)
1978–1979	Cleveland Force (indoor)	4	(1)
1980–1981	Chicago Horizons (indoor)	14	(10)

Managerial career
- 1978: Cleveland Force
Father	Albert Fearnley
Relatives	Stan Fearnley (brother)
- * Club domestic league appearances and goals

Gordon Fearnley (25 January 1950 – 25 June 2015) was an English footballer who spent time in the Football League, North American Soccer League and Major Indoor Soccer League.

In 1968, Fearnley signed with Sheffield Wednesday. In 1970, he moved to the Bristol Rovers. In 1976, the Rovers sent him on loan to the Toronto Metros-Croatia of the North American Soccer League. After playing just one game, he was transferred to the Miami Toros. In 1977, Bristol sold his contract to the Fort Lauderdale Strikers. In 1978, he left the NASL and played for the Cleveland Force in Major Indoor Soccer League. After one season, he played for the Chicago Horizon.

In May 1978, Fearnley was hired as the head coach of the Birmingham Bandits, a team in the newly created Super Soccer League. However, financial irregularities prevented the league from ever beginning operations and Fearnley was released. During the few months he worked with the Bandits, he met Alaina Jones, the team's director of public relations. The two eventually married. In the fall of 1978, he took charge of the Cleveland Force of the newly established Major Indoor Soccer League. He took the team to a 2–4 record and resigned. After retirement he studied Physiotherapy & Law, and later worked as an attorney in Florida.
