= Wicket-keeper =

Fielding position in cricket

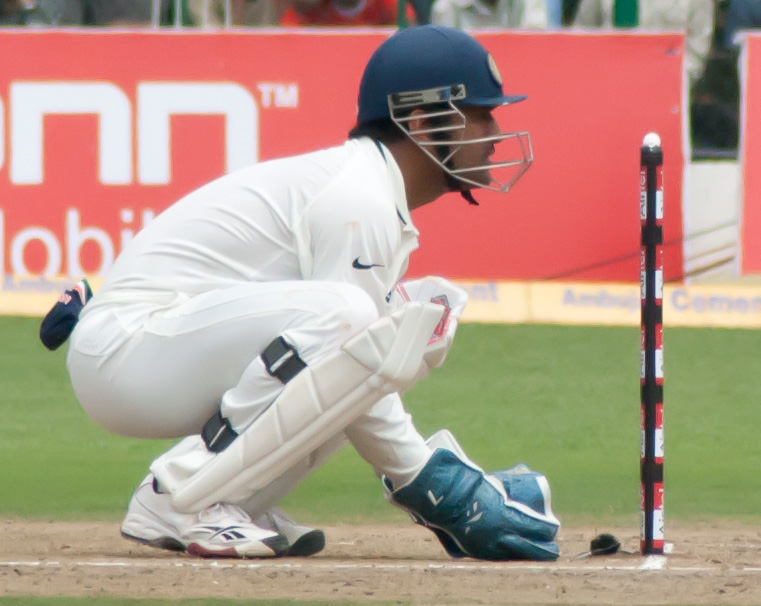
Wicket-keeper MS Dhoni in characteristic full squatting position, receiving a delivery from a slow-pace or spin bowler

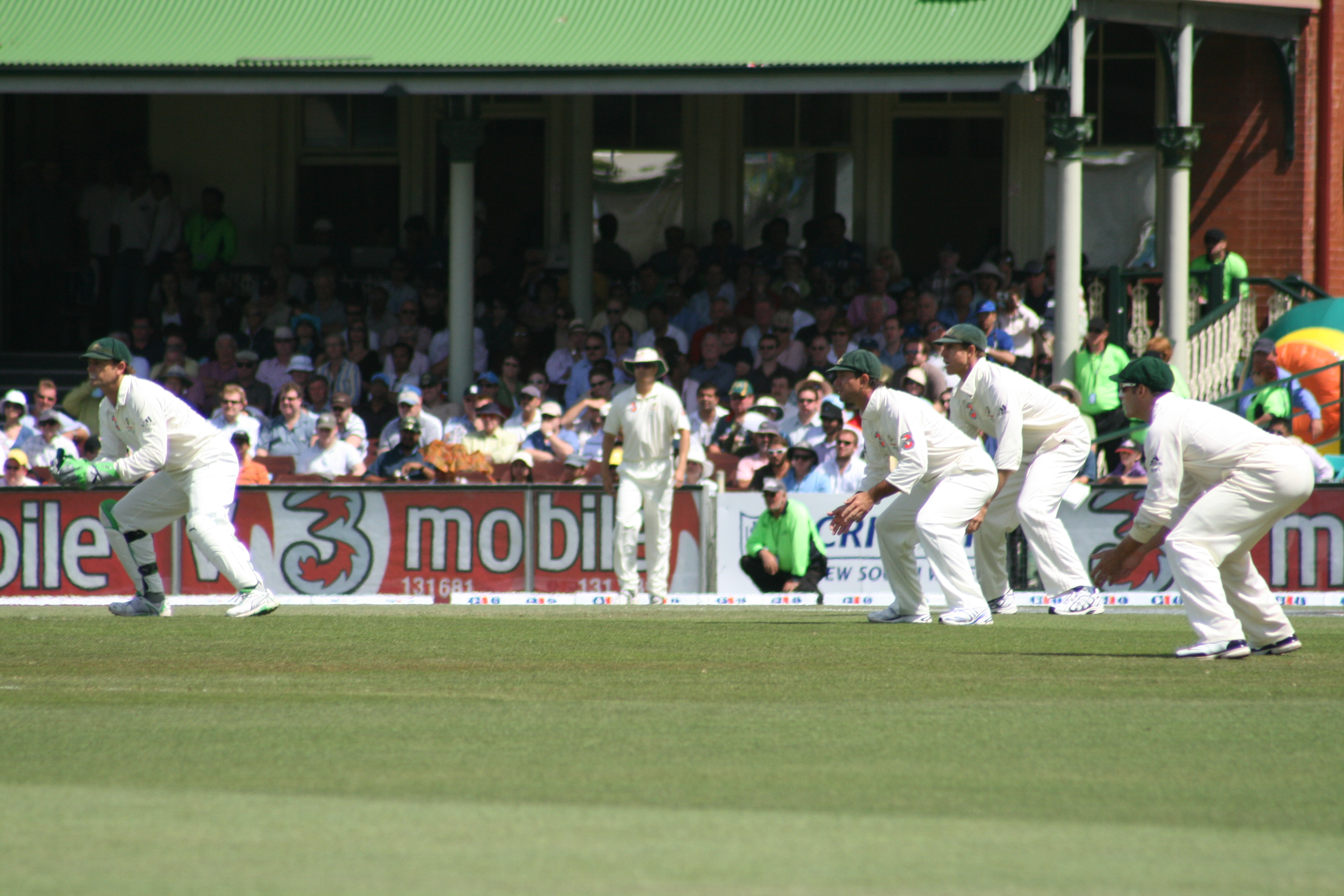
Wicket-keeper (left) in characteristic partial squatting position (together with slip fielders), receiving a delivery from a fast bowler.

In cricket, the wicket-keeper is the player on the fielding side who stands behind the wicket at the striker's end, ready to stop deliveries that pass the batsman and take a catch, stump the batsman out, or run out a batsman when the occasion arises, using specific stances to achieve this. The wicket-keeper is the only member of the fielding side permitted to wear gloves and external leg guards, complete with specifications regarding the gloves. The role of the keeper is governed by Law 27 of the Laws of Cricket.

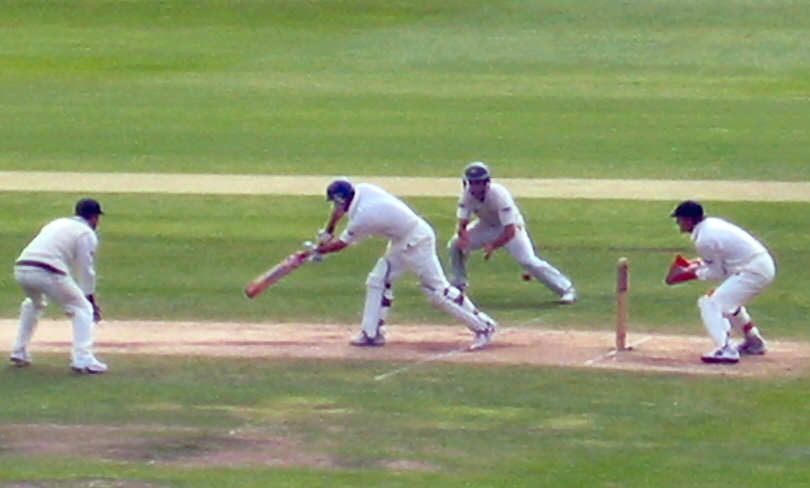
Adam Gilchrist of Australia standing up to the stumps against England during the fourth test of the 2005 Ashes series in England.

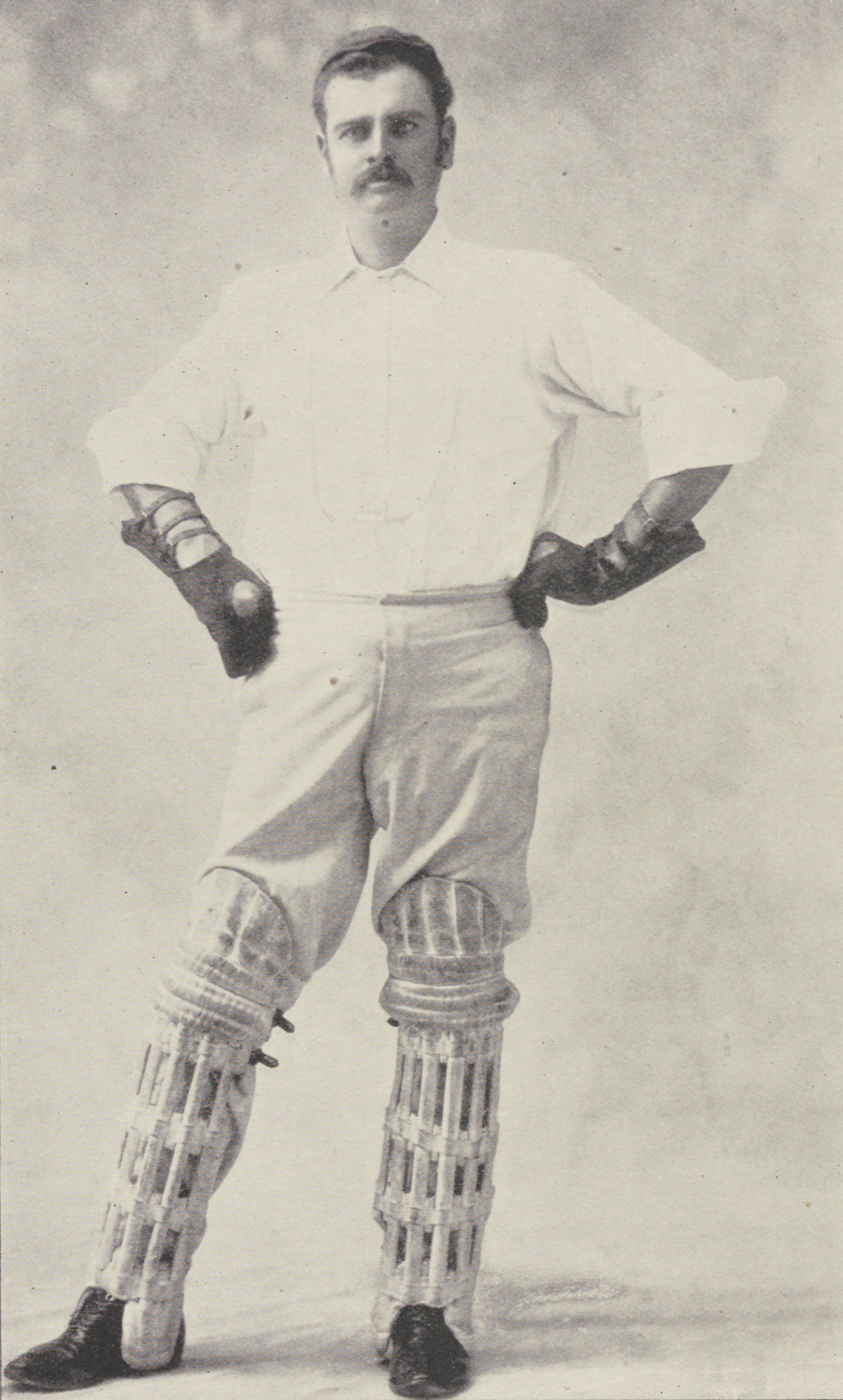
Affie Jarvis in wicket-keeping equipment, c. 1897

== Stance ==
Initially, during the bowling of the ball, the wicket-keeper crouches in a full squatting position but partly stands up as the ball is received. Australian wicket-keeper Sammy Carter (1878 to 1948) was the first to squat on his haunches rather than bend over from the waist (stooping).

== Purposes ==
The keeper's major function is to stop deliveries that pass the batsman (to prevent runs being scored as 'byes'), but he can also attempt to dismiss the batsman in various ways:

- The most common dismissal the keeper effects is catching a ball that has nicked the batsman's bat, called an edge, before it bounces. Occasionally the keeper is also in the best position to catch a ball hit high in the air. Wicket-keepers take more catches than any other fielding position.
- The keeper can stump the batsman by using the ball to remove the bails from the stump if the batsman is out of his crease after a delivery has passed the stumps into the keeper's hands. The keeper must then dislodge the bail(s), and the batsman is out if he is still outside the crease.
- When the ball is hit into the outfield, the keeper moves close to the stumps to catch the return throw from a fielder and, if possible, to run out a batsman by collecting the ball in his gloves and putting down the wickets.
- If the batter and non-striker attempt to run a bye after the batsman misses or doesn't play a shot, the wicketkeeper can throw the ball at the stumps after he catches the delivery. In outfield cricket, it is rare because the non-striker is likely to be out. Still, when it happens, it is usually an important moment where the batting team is trying desperately to score a run to win, tie a game, or get the stronger batter in a partnership on strike so they can bat instead. This play is common during indoor cricket games due to the shorter distance the non-striker has to run and the penalty for a wicket being runs, not the loss of the batter themselves. It is common for indoor cricket wicket-keepers to only wear a single glove in order to make throws to the non-striker's end easier to hit.
- One of the only two instances of a field dismissal being obstructed in Test cricket occurred when a batter attempted to hit the ball away from a catch being taken by the keeper.
- The only instance of a hit the ball twice wicket during an international game occurred when the batsman failed his initial shot, then knocked the ball away from the wicketkeeper to prevent the throwing out of the non-striker in a run-out.

A keeper's position depends on the bowler: for fast bowling, he will squat some distance from the stumps in order to have time to react to edges from the batsman, while for slower bowling, he will come much nearer to the stumps (known as "standing up"), to pressure the batsman into remaining within the crease or risk being stumped. The more skilled the keeper, the faster the bowling, to which he is able to "stand up"; for instance, Godfrey Evans often stood up to Alec Bedser.

Like the other players on a cricket team, the keepers will bat during the team's batting innings. At elite levels, wicketkeepers are generally expected to be proficient batters, averaging considerably more than specialist bowlers. This wicket-keeper-batsman form became popular in the 1990s as the Australian national team saw success when elevating Adam Gilchrist to the team after the retirement of Ian Healy. Healy averaged 27.39 and 4,356 runs total from his 119 Test matches and is viewed as a specialist wicket-keeper who had improved his marginally effective batting toward the end of his career. Gilchrist, on the other hand, was a dominating, powerful batsman from the start, playing 96 Test matches with a 47.60 average with 5,570 total runs despite playing 23 fewer matches. Gilchrist's success effectively forced the specialist wicket-keeper into extinction at the top levels of the sport, as teams could no longer afford to pick a mediocre or poor batsman in the position as long as the player who was chosen could perform up to basic standards of the wicket-keeper position when fielding.

== Legal specifications of wicket-keeping gloves ==
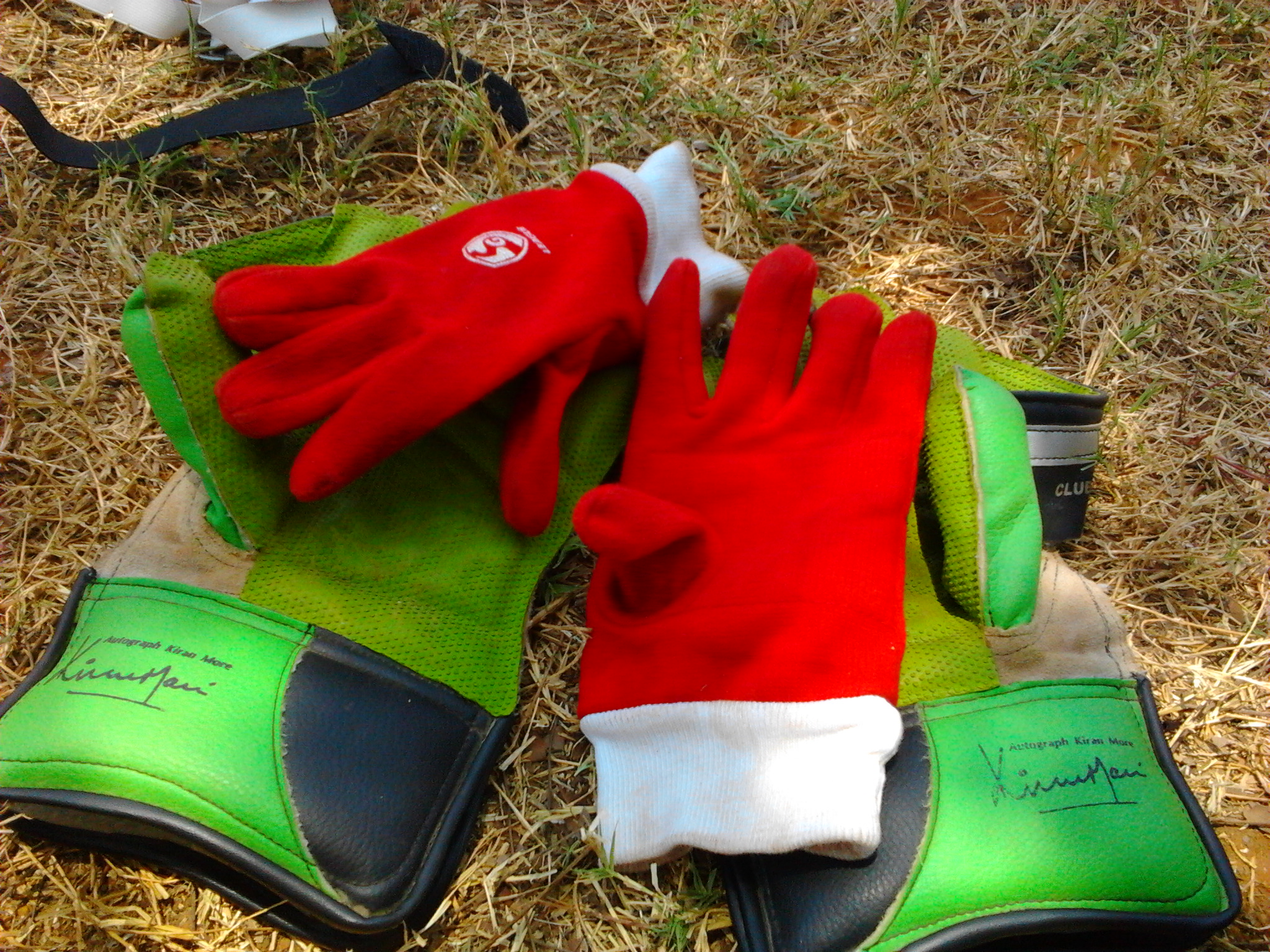
Wicket keeping gloves along with the inner gloves

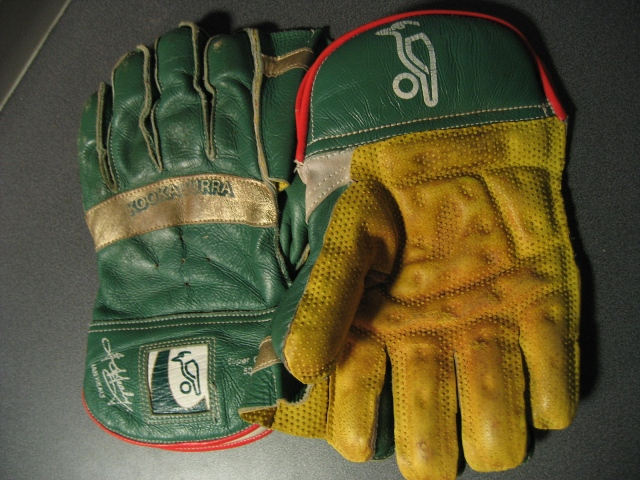
A pair of wicket-keeping gloves. The webbing which helps the keeper to catch the ball can be seen between the thumb and index fingers.

Law 27.2, which deals with the specifications for wicketkeepers' gloves, states that:

- If ... the wicket-keeper wears gloves, they shall have no webbing between the fingers except joining index finger and thumb, where webbing may be inserted as a means of support.
- If used, the webbing shall be a single piece of non-stretch material which, although it may have facing material attached, shall have no reinforcements or tucks.
- The top edge of the webbing shall not protrude beyond the straight line joining the top of the index finger to the top of the thumb and shall be taut when a hand wearing the glove has the thumb fully extended.

== Substitutes ==
Substitutes were previously not allowed to keep wicket, but this restriction was lifted in the 2017 edition of the Laws of Cricket.

This rule was sometimes suspended, by agreement with the captain of the batting side. For example, during the England–New Zealand Test match at Lord's in 1986, England's specialist keeper, Bruce French, was injured while batting during England's first innings. England then used four keepers in New Zealand's first innings: Bill Athey kept for the first two overs; 45-year-old veteran Bob Taylor was pulled out of the sponsor's tent to keep for overs 3 to 76; Bobby Parks, the Hampshire keeper, was called up for overs 77 to 140; and Bruce French kept wicket for the final ball of the innings.

Arthur Jones was the first substitute to keep wicket in a Test match, when he did so against Australia at The Oval in 1905. Virat Kohli substituted for keeper MS Dhoni when the latter needed a toilet break during a 2015 ODI match between India and Bangladesh.

== Playing without a wicket-keeper ==
There is no rule stating a team must play with a wicket-keeper. On 5 June 2015 during a T20 Blast game between the Worcestershire Rapids and the Northamptonshire Steelbacks, Worcestershire chose not to play a wicket-keeper in the 16th over of the match. Their keeper, Ben Cox, became an extra fielder at fly slip while spinner Moeen Ali bowled. The umpires consulted and agreed that nothing in the Laws prevented it.

== Leading male international wicket-keepers ==
=== Test ===
The following are the top 10 wicket-keepers by total dismissals in Test cricket.

Leading Test match wicket-keepers by dismissals^{1}
Rank	Name	Country	Matches	Caught	Stumped	Total dismissals
1	Mark Boucher	South Africa	147	532	23	555
2	Adam Gilchrist	Australia	96	379	37	416
3	Ian Healy	Australia	119	366	29	395
4	Rod Marsh	Australia	96	343	12	355
5	MS Dhoni	India	90	256	38	294
6	Brad Haddin	Australia	66	262	8	270
6	Jeff Dujon	West Indies	81	265	5	270
8	Alan Knott	England	95	250	19	269
9	BJ Watling	New Zealand	75	257	8	265
10	Matt Prior	England	79	243	13	256
Statistics are correct as of 11 July 2024.: **Bold** indicates current player.; Matches is the total number of Tests played, which is not necessarily the number of matches keeping wicket.; Some of the players listed have additional catches in games they have played as a normal fielder.

=== ODI ===
The following are the top wicket-keepers by total dismissals in one day cricket.

Leading one-day wicket-keepers by dismissals
Rank	Name	Country	Matches	Caught	Stumped	Total dismissals
1	Kumar Sangakkara	Sri Lanka	404	383	99	482
2	Adam Gilchrist	Australia	287	417	55	472
3	MS Dhoni	India	350	321	123	444
4	Mark Boucher	South Africa	295	403	22	424
5	Mushfiqur Rahim	Bangladesh	271	237	56	293
6	Moin Khan	Pakistan	219	214	73	287
7	**Jos Buttler**	England	181	221	37	258
8	Brendon McCullum	New Zealand	260	227	15	242
9	Ian Healy	Australia	168	194	39	233
10	Quinton de Kock	South Africa	155	209	17	226
Statistics are correct as of 11 July 2024.: **Bold** indicates current player.; Matches is the total number of ODIs played, which is not necessarily the number of matches keeping wicket.; A number of the players listed have additional catches in games they have played as a normal fielder.

=== T20I ===
The following are the top 10 wicket-keepers by total dismissals in Twenty20 International cricket.

Leading T20I wicket-keepers by dismissals
Rank	Name	Country	Matches	Caught	Stumped	Total dismissals
1	**Quinton de Kock**	South Africa	92	84	18	102
2	MS Dhoni	India	98	57	34	91
3	Irfan Karim	Kenya	58	59	24	83
4	**Jos Buttler**	England	124	67	13	80
5	Matthew Wade	Australia	92	58	6	64
6	Denesh Ramdin	West Indies	71	43	20	63
7	Mushfiqur Rahim	Bangladesh	102	32	30	62
8	Mohammad Shahzad	Afghanistan	73	33	28	61
9	Kamran Akmal	Pakistan	58	28	32	60
10	**Scott Edwards**	Netherlands	64	53	7	60
Statistics are correct as of 10 July 2024.: **Bold** indicates current player.; Matches is the total number of T20Is played, which is not necessarily the number of matches keeping wicket.; A number of the players listed have additional catches in games they have played as a normal fielder.

== See also ==
- Catcher
- Glossary of cricket terms
- Wicket-keeper's gloves

== Bibliography ==
- Surya Prakash Chaturvedi, Bharat ke Wicket Keepers, National Book Trust, 2011.
