= Stan Fearnley =

England international rugby league footballer

Personal information
- Full name: Stanley Fearnley
- Born: 21 January 1947 (age 79) Bradford district, England

Playing information
- Position: Loose forward
Club
Years	Team	Pld	T	G	FG	P
1965–67	Bradford Northern	30	5	0	0	15
1967–68	Halifax	46	5	0	0	15
1968–77	Bradford Northern	189	36	0	0	108
1977–78	Leeds	38	3	0	0	9
	Total	303	49	0	0	147
Representative
Years	Team	Pld	T	G	FG	P
1975	England	1	0	0	0	0
- Father: Albert Fearnley
- Relatives: Gordon Fearnley (brother)

Stanley Fearnley (born 21 January 1947) is an English former professional rugby league footballer who played in the 1960s and 1970s. He played at representative level for England, and at club level for Bradford Northern and Leeds, as a loose forward.

== Background ==
Fearnley played rugby league for Clayton Juniors during his youth. He is the son of the former rugby league player and coach, Albert Fearnley.

== Playing career ==
=== Bradford Northern ===
At the age of 17, Fearnley joined Bradford Northern in 1964, and made his first team debut for the club in April 1965. He was transferred to Halifax in 1967 as part of a exchange deal for Ken Roberts, before returning to Bradford Northern a year later. He continued playing for Bradford until 1977, scoring 41 tries in 217 games across both spells at the club.

He played loose forward, and scored a try in Bradford Northern's 14–33 defeat by Featherstone Rovers in the 1973 Challenge Cup Final during the 1972–73 season at Wembley Stadium, London on Saturday 12 May 1973, in front of a crowd of 72,395.

Fearnley played loose forward in Bradford Northern's 3–2 victory over Widnes in the 1974–75 Player's No.6 Trophy Final during the 1974–75 season at Wilderspool Stadium, Warrington on Saturday 25 January 1975.

=== Leeds ===
Fearnley played loose forward (replaced by substitute Roy Dickinson) in Leeds' 16–7 victory over Widnes in the 1977 Challenge Cup Final during the 1976–77 season at Wembley Stadium, London on Saturday 7 May 1977, in front of a crowd of 80,871.

=== International honours ===
Stan Fearnley won a cap, and played loose forward in England's 0–25 defeat by Australia in the 1975 Rugby League World Cup Final at Headingley, Leeds on 12 November 1975.
