= Albert Fearnley =

English RL coach and former rugby league footballer

Personal information
- Full name: Albert Fearnley
- Born: 10 March 1924; Bradford, England
- Died: 4 May 1999 (aged 75); Felixstowe, Suffolk, England

Playing information
- Position: Second-row, Hooker
Club
Years	Team	Pld	T	G	FG	P
1949–50	Oldham RLFC	29	5	0	0	15
1950–57	Halifax RLFC	207	38	0	0	114
	Total	236	43	0	0	129

Coaching information
Club
Years	Team	Gms	W	D	L	W%
1964–65	Halifax RLFC
1967–69	Bradford Northern
1975	Bradford Northern
1977	Batley
1978–79	Blackpool Borough
1979	Keighley
1980–81	Keighley
	Total	0	0	0	0
- Relatives: Gordon Fearnley (son); Stanley Fearnley (son)

Albert Fearnley (10 March 1924 – 4 May 1999) was an English rugby league footballer who played in the 1950s, and coached in the 1960s and 1950s. Fearnley started his career at Rochdale Hornets and went on to play for Oldham, Halifax, Featherstone Rovers and Batley, as second-row. After retiring as a player, he coached at club level for Halifax, Bradford Northern, Batley, and Blackpool Borough.

== Background ==
Fearnley was born in Bradford, West Riding of Yorkshire, England.

== Playing career ==
=== Challenge Cup Final appearances ===
Fearnley played at second-row in Halifax's 4–8 defeat by Warrington in the 1954 Challenge Cup Final replay during the 1953–54 season at Odsal Stadium, Bradford on Wednesday 5 May 1954, in front of a record crowd of 102,575 or more.

== Coaching career ==
Fearnley was the coach in Halifax's 15–7 victory over St. Helens in the 1964–65 Championship Final during the 1964–65 season at Station Road, Swinton on Saturday 22 May 1965.

Fearnley joined Bradford Northern as a developments officer in 1966, and worked in several different roles at the club over the next decade. He replaced Gus Risman as coach in 1967, but relinquished his coaching duties in 1969 due to increased responsibilities in his administrative role at the club.

Fearnley was the coach of Batley from June 1977 to October 1977.

== Personal life ==
Fearnley had two sons and one daughter. His elder son, Stan, played for Bradford Northern while Albert was general manager at the club, and also went on to play for Leeds. His other son, Gordon, was a professional footballer who played for Sheffield Wednesday, Bristol Rovers and Fort Lauderdale Strikers.
