= Michael Fearnley =

English cricketer

Michael Carruthers Fearnley (21 August 1936 – 7 July 1979) was an English first-class cricketer, who played three matches for Yorkshire County Cricket Club from 1962 to 1964, against Essex, Surrey and Warwickshire respectively.

== Life and career ==
Born in Horsforth, Leeds, Yorkshire, England, Fearnley was a right-armed medium pacer, who took six wickets at 22.16, with a best of 3 for 56 on his debut against Essex. A left-handed bat, he scored 19 runs at 9.50, with a top score of 11 not out, also in his debut match. He also appeared for Yorkshire Second XI from 1959 to 1966, Nottinghamshire Second XI in 1960 and a Bradford League representative side in 1967.

His brother, Duncan Fearnley, played 97 games for Worcestershire, and founded the cricket bat manufacturing company while his nephew, Paul Fearnley, played several Second XI cricket matches for Worcestershire.

Fearnley died in July 1979 in East Bierley, Bradford, aged 42, while playing in a Bradford League match for Farsley Cricket Club, which he captained with distinction. He held the record for the number of wickets in a career in the Bradford League, beating the old record of 1273 wickets in 1978, the year before he died. He was Chairman of the Association of Cricket Coaches, the Director of the Centre of Excellence for Cricket in Leeds, and was assistant coach with Yorkshire for 13 years.
