= Duncan Fearnley =

English cricketer (1940–2024)

Personal information
- Full name: Charles Duncan Fearnley
- Born: 12 April 1940; Pudsey, Yorkshire, England
- Died: 8 March 2024 (aged 83)
- Batting: Left-handed
- Role: Batsman
- Relatives: Michael Fearnley (brother); Nile Wilson (great nephew)

Domestic team information
- Years: Team
- 1962–1968: Worcestershire
- First-class debut: 9 May 1962 Worcestershire v Glamorgan
- Last First-class: 26 August 1968 Worcestershire v Essex
- List A debut: 4 May 1968 Worcestershire v Durham
- Last List A: 12 June 1971 Lincolnshire v Warwickshire

Career statistics
| Competition | First-class | List A |
|---|---|---|
| Matches | 97 | 4 |
| Runs scored | 3,294 | 107 |
| Batting average | 20.58 | 35.66 |
| 100s/50s | 1/14 | 0/1 |
| Top score | 112 | 55* |
| Balls bowled | 36 | – |
| Wickets | 1 | – |
| Bowling average | 37.00 | – |
| 5 wickets in innings | 0 | – |
| 10 wickets in match | 0 | – |
| Best bowling | 1/37 | – |
| Catches/stumpings | 28/– | 3/– |
- Source: CricketArchive, 7 December 2008

Charles Duncan Fearnley (12 April 1940 – 8 March 2024), more commonly known as Duncan Fearnley, was an English first class cricketer who, after retirement as a player, became a producer of cricket bats. Fearnley was also the great-uncle of British Olympic gymnast Nile Wilson.

== Birth and early life ==
Fearnley was born in Pudsey, Yorkshire. In 1955 he had just played for the England Schoolboys team and hoped for a career in professional cricket, but during the winter months he began making cricket bats to supplement his income.

The first bats Fearnley made were branded 'Tudor Rose', but soon they became known as 'Fearnley of Farsley'.

== Cricket career ==
Fearnley's could not make it into his home county's 1st XI, only managing to play for Yorkshire's second XI with two appearances in 1959. He sought trials elsewhere and in 1960 joined Worcestershire where after two further seasons of second XI cricket, he made his first-class debut in 1962. As a left-hand opening batsman he played 97 matches for Worcestershire between 1962 and 1968, featuring most often during the county's maiden Championship-winning season of 1964 when he appeared 22 times. His average was always around 20, with a highest season average of 25.60 achieved in 1966 when he made his only first-class century, an innings of 112 against Derbyshire at Kidderminster.

Fearnley left Worcestershire at the end of 1968 and played three seasons of Minor Counties cricket for Lincolnshire, before returning to Worcestershire to captain the second XI in 1972.

=== Post playing ===
Fearnley became chairman of Worcestershire in 1986 and was influential in signing Ian Botham and Graham Dilley to the county ahead of the 1987 season. During his tenure as chairman the club had its most successful period in its history winning six trophies. After leaving the role in 1998, he served on the county's committee. He would go on to serve the county as Club President from 2011 to 2013.

Fearnley was one of the founders of Chance to Shine, the cricketing charity, alongside Mark Nicholas and Mervyn King.

== Cricket bat company ==
At the same time he established his highly successful eponymous bat-manufacturing company, during the early years Fearnley got many of his ex-playing colleagues and opponents to use his products. Introducing new forms of sponsorship, he built the brand around these friends. John Snow was the first to use the Duncan Fearnley bat in an international, with the likes of Basil D'Oliveira and Dennis Amiss close behind.

By the early 1980s, Fearnley had become the dominant brand within the market throughout the world. At the time many top international cricketers were using or wearing the three-stump symbol. Players such as Sunil Gavaskar, Clive Lloyd, Kepler Wessels, Ian Botham, Graham Gooch, Graeme Hick, Viv Richards, Graeme Pollock, Wasim Akram, Ravi Shastri, Allan Border, Martin Crowe and many more were putting their trust in the product.

During the 1990s the marketplace changed, with many smaller brands developing, and cricket bat production started to move overseas to India and Pakistan. Fearnley firmly resisted this trend and cut production accordingly, still concentrating on totally hand-crafted bats at its factory in Worcester.

The brand still operates from its Worcester base, with a factory producing, by hand, up to 5,000 bats per year.

Fearnley still remains one of the major UK manufacturers as other companies seek overseas production, and is still one of the world's most recognised names in cricket, with Vikram Solanki and Darren Gough two of the main UK endorsements. New markets include club clothing and ground equipment. The company manufactures and retails clothing and accessories for the ECB Association of Cricket Officials.

== Death ==
Fearnley died on 8 March 2024, at the age of 83.
