= Encyclopedia of Australian Science and Innovation =

The Encyclopedia of Australian Science and Innovation is an online repository of data about people and organisations that have contributed to science and technology in Australia.

First created in 1985 as the Australian Science Archives Project, the collection was held at Melbourne University until 2020. In 2010, the project was published online as the Encyclopedia of Australian Science, and combined two previously separate databases, Bright Sparcs (1994-2010) and Australian Science at Work (1999-2010). It uses Online Heritage Resource Manager in its backend for data and web publication.

Renamed the Encyclopedia of Australian Science and Innovation in 2022, it is currently maintained by Swinburne University of Technology.
