= John Atkinson Pendlington =

John Atkinson Pendlington (September 1861 – 15 January 1914) was the inventor of a linear scoring system for cricket before 1893. Unlike conventional scoring systems, the linear system shows balls faced by each batsman from each bowler. Until recently, the linear system was believed to have been developed more recently by Australian scorer Bill Ferguson in around 1905. Any link between the linear scoring systems used by Ferguson and Pendlington remain unclear.

== Private life ==
Pendlington was born in South Shields, County Durham, in 1861. He played cricket for Benwell in the Northumberland League. He married Annie Dickinson Topping in 1886. They had at least two children, a son John Robert Pendlington in 1891 and a daughter Mary Florence Pendlington in 1892.

He was one of two partners who established Tyneside Electrical Supply Company in 1893, which became the British Electrical and Manufacturing Company (Bemco) in 1908.

He died in 1914 and was buried at St James's church in Benwell. The probate records that identify his date of death describe him as an "accountant".

== Linear scoring ==
A report of Pendlington's death in January 1914 - sent to Richie Benaud by Pendlington's grandson in 1994 and mentioned in Benaud's book My Spin on Cricket (2005) - mentioned that Pendlington used his system at a match between C. I. Thornton's XI and the Australian tourists at the North Marine Road Ground, Scarborough in September 1893, the penultimate match played by the Australian team on that tour. The scoring innovation amused W.G. Grace, to whom Pendlington presented the original scoresheet. Its current location is not known.

Bill Frindall in his book Bearders: My Life in Cricket (Orion, London, 2006, page 70-71) also acknowledges Pendlington as the inventor, and mentions other evidence of it pre-dating Ferguson.
