= Jane Fearnley-Whittingstall =

British writer

Jane Margaret Fearnley-Whittingstall (née Lascelles) (born 1939 in Kensington, London) is a writer and garden designer with a diploma in landscape architecture. She won two gold medals at the Chelsea Flower Show.

== Personal life ==
Her parents were Colonel John Hawdon Lascelles OBE of the King's Royal Rifle Corps and Janet Hamilton Campbell Kidston, She and her husband, Robert Fearnley-Whittingstall, of a landed gentry family formerly of Watford and Hawkswick, Hertfordshire, have two children: Sophy and Hugh, the celebrity chef. They have six grandchildren.

== Career ==
Fearnley-Whittingstall gained a Diploma in Landscape Architecture from Gloucestershire College of Art and Design in 1980 and has designed numerous gardens in the UK and abroad.

From 2005 to 2007 she wrote a weekly column about family life, in The Times. She has also written for The Daily Telegraph, Daily Mail, The Oldie, Woman's Weekly, The Garden, The English Garden and Gardens Illustrated.

== Books ==
Fearnley-Whittingstall has published the following books:

- Rose Gardens: Their History and Design (Chatto and Windus 1989)
- Historic Gardens: A Guide to 160 British Gardens of Interest (Webb and Bower 1990)
- Ivies (Chatto and Windus 1992)
- Gardening Made Easy: A Step-By-Step Guide to Planning, Preparing, Planting, Maintaining and Enjoying Your Garden (Weidenfeld and Nicolson 1995)
- Garden Plants Made Easy (Weidenfeld & Nicolson 1997)
- Peonies - the Imperial Flower (Weidenfeld & Nicolson 1999)
- The Garden: an English Love Affair (Weidenfeld & Nicolson 2002)
- The Good Granny Guide: Or How to Be a Modern Grandmother (Short Books Ltd 2005) (illustrated by Alex Fox)
- The Good Granny Diary (Short Books Ltd 2006) (illustrated by Alex Fox)
- The Good Granny Cookbook (Short Books Ltd 2007)
- The Good Granny Companion (Short Books Ltd 2008)
- For Better for Worse – a light-hearted guide to wedded bliss (Short Books 2010), also published as 'Happily Ever After' (Marble Arch Press New York 2013)
- The Ministry of Food – Thrifty wartime ways to feed your family today (Hodder & Stoughton 2010)
- The Pocket Book of Good Grannies (Short Books 2011)
