= Bill Ferguson (cricket scorer) =

Australian cricket scorer (1880–1957)

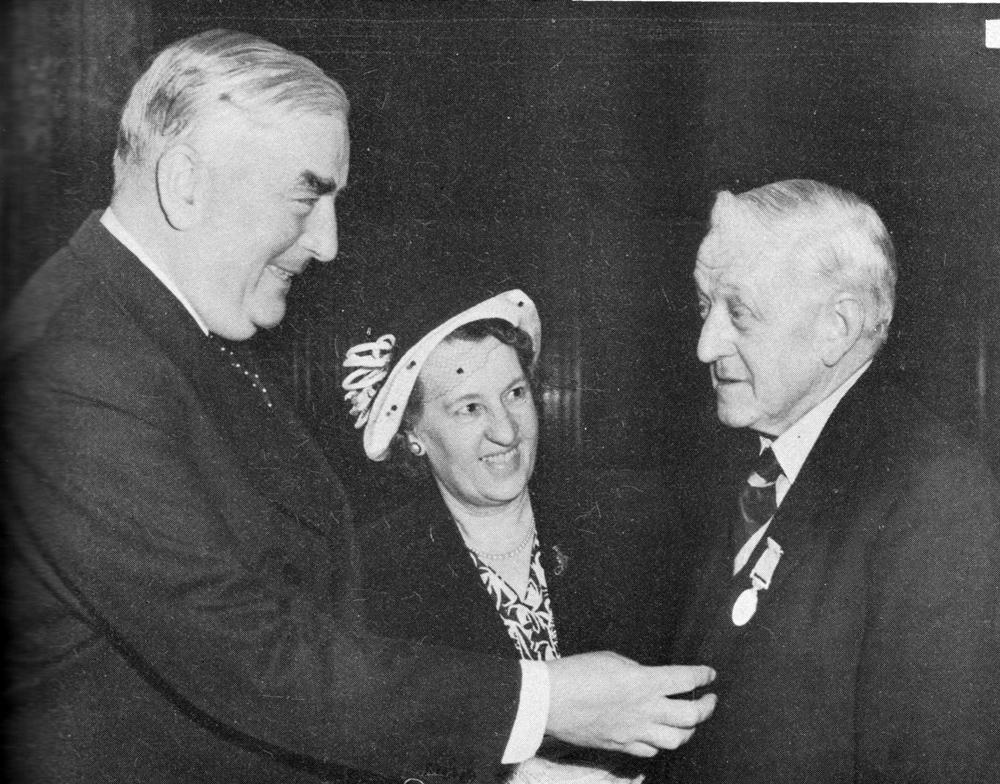
Bill Ferguson (R), his wife Peggy, and Robert Menzies

William Henry Ferguson BEM (6 June 1880 – 22 September 1957) is one of the best-known cricket scorers. For 52 years from 1905 until his death, Ferguson acted as the scorer and baggageman for Australia, England, West Indies, South Africa and New Zealand in 43 tours and 208 Test matches.

Ferguson is often credited with two of the most revolutionary innovations in scoring. He developed the radial scoring chart, which shows the directions in which a batsman scored his runs. Originally called "Ferguson's charts", they are now popularly known as "wagon-wheels". He was one of the first scorers to use a linear system of scoring which, unlike the conventional system, keeps track of the balls faced by a batsman and off a particular bowler. In order to record such details, including the times of significant events during an innings, he designed his own scoring books – "which contain[ed] at least twice as much information as any other in the world" – and had them printed at his own expense. At the same time he also filled in a conventional scoring book for official use. He retained his own scoring books.

Ferguson received the British Empire Medal in 1951. He scored for the West Indian cricket team in England in 1957 at the beginning of the tour, but had to give up during the tour after a bad fall. He died at his home in Bath, Somerset, a few weeks later, aged 77. He published his autobiography, Mr Cricket, a few months before his death.
