= Surya Prakash Chaturvedi =

Indian cricketer (born 1937)

Surya Prakash Chaturvedi (born 7 November 1937 in Indore, Madhya Pradesh) is a cricket critic, writer and historian. He is a former professor of English at the Government Arts and Commerce College, Indore, where he taught for 35 years. He played cricket at the collegiate level, representing Indore University and Christian College, Indore as a middle order batsman. So far he has authored 13 books on the subject, all in Hindi.

== Early works ==
He began writing on the game and covering matches for Nayi Duniya. Later, he wrote for famous magazines such as Dharmayuga, Saptaahik Hindustan, Ravivaar and also for newspapers like Jansatta, Navbharat times and Dainik Bhaskar. He worked as the Honorary Secretary for Indore Divisional Cricket Association for eight years and as the President of ISPORA – Indore Sports Writer's Association for five years. He started with Hindi translation of Vijay Hazare's Book entitled "Main aur mere Samkaaleen".

== Publications ==
1. C.K. Nayudu, 1995 (Publications Division Govt. of India)
2. Mushtaq Ali, 1997 (Publications Division Govt. of India)
3. Azad Bharat Mein Cricket, 2000 (National Book Trust)
4. Hamaare Aaj Ke Cricket Sitaare, 2003 (Publications Division Govt. of India)
5. Number Ek Kaun Aur Kyun? – Sachin, Waugh ya Lara, 2003 (Publications Division Govt. of India)
6. Vishwa Cricket Aur Bharat, 2005 (National Book Trust): Translated in English by Sandeep Sinha of Hindustan Times.
7. Bharat Ki Spin Parampara, 2007 (Rajkamal Prakashan)
8. Allrounders, 2007 (National Book Trust): Translated into English, Marathi, Urdu and Punjabi.
9. Humaare Kaptaan: Naidu se Dhoni Tak, 2010 (Rajkamal Prakashan)
10. Bharat ke Wicket Keepers, 2011 (National Book Trust)
11. Cricket Umpires, 2012 (National Book Trust)
12. बाईस गज की दुनिया,2015 (Rajkamal Prakashan)1
13. Badalti Hawayain, 2019 (Neeraj Book Center, Delhi)

== Honors ==
He has been honored by various associations and societies for his contributions to cricket and Hindi. Prominent among them are:

- The Indore Divisional Cricket Association.
- Akhil Bharatiya Rashtrabhasha Sahitya Prachar Samiti.
- Madhavrao Scindia Lifetime achievement award of MPCA in 2016.

== Bibliography ==
- Mahan Khilari – C. K. Naidu (in Hindi), Publications Division, Government of India
- Muśtāka Alī (in Hindi), Publications Division, Government of India, 1996, ISBN 978-81-230-0524-9, OCLC 36995152
- Āl rāʼūnḍars (in Hindi), Publications Division, Government of India, 1996, ISBN 978-81-237-5354-6, OCLC 449202530
- Bhāratīya spina gendabājī kī paramparā (in Hindi), Rājakamala Prakāśana, 2007, ISBN 978-81-267-1288-5, OCLC 145485136
- Ôlarāuṇḍarsā (in Hindi), Neśanala Buka Ṭrasṭa, 2007, ISBN 978-81-237-4957-0, OCLC 417622883
