= BBC Radio 5 (former) =

British national radio station (1990–1994)

- United Kingdom
- Frequencies: 693 kHz, 909 kHz (990 kHz in West Wales)

Programming
- Format: Sports, children's and educational programmes

Ownership
- Owner: BBC

History
- First air date: 27 August 1990; 35 years ago
- Last air date: 27 March 1994; 32 years ago

BBC Radio 5 was a national radio station that broadcast sports, children's and educational programmes. It ran from 1990 to 1994 and was transmitted via analogue radio on 693 and 909 kHz AM.

On 28 March 1994, three years and seven months after the station started, it was replaced by BBC Radio 5 Live, following the success of rolling news coverage of the Gulf War on BBC Radio 4 News FM.

== History ==
=== Launch ===
A new fifth national radio station was first announced by the BBC on 9 October 1988. In line with the Conservative government's broadcasting policy at the time, the BBC ended its longstanding practice of simulcasting its services on both AM and FM, freeing the medium wave frequencies which BBC Radio 2 had been using since 23 November 1978 for another use.

On 15 August 1990, Radio 2 began to draw to a close its medium wave transmissions by broadcasting a daytime information service providing advice about how to listen on FM as well as advertisements for the new station. This continued until 2.00 pm on the day before Radio 5's launch, and Radio 2 ended its medium wave transmissions at midnight on Sunday 26 August. Nine hours later, at 9.00 am on Monday 27 August, Radio 5 launched with five-year-old boy Andrew Kelly uttering the words:

Hello, good morning and welcome to Radio 5.

Prior to this, the new station's frequencies broadcast a long sequence of programming trails linked by Jon Briggs (one of the station's launch presenting team) and pre-recorded sketches from comedians Trevor Neal and Simon Hickson (consisting of the two larking about in the studio amid the strains of "Sailing By", and Trevor suddenly being cut off while he was reading his so-called "Ode to Radio 5"). The official first programme was Take Five, a pre-recorded programme by Bruno Brookes.

=== Structure ===
Many believed that BBC Radio 5 was a service the four other main BBC stations did not want, reflected in a speech by Jenny Abramsky, News International Visiting professor of Broadcast Media 2002 at Exeter College, Oxford University. Abramsky described the service,

The sports output from Radio 2 Medium Wave, all the Schools and Continuing Education programmes from Radio 4 FM, the Open University programmes from Radios 3 and 4 FM, and programmes for children and young people from Radio 4 and some World Service output. This was a network with no audience focus, born out of expediency.

In 1991, Operation Desert Storm was launched, as part of the multinational response to the Iraqi invasion of Kuwait. From 16 January, Radio 4's FM frequencies were used to provide an all-news network for the coverage of the war, dubbed 'Radio 4 News FM' (or more popularly in the media as Scud FM), but despite protests mainly received praise for the quality of this service and the speed with which it was established. Following the end of the conflict, Radio 4 resumed its normal schedule but the positive response to commencing review into the possibility of providing a full-time news station, leading to the broadcast of a similar service on longwave during the 1992 general election campaign. Due to the resistance to any use of Radio 4 FM (or LW) frequencies, it was decided that Radio 5, criticised by John Birt as "improvised and disjointed", would relaunch as a combined news and sports channel.

=== Demise ===
The "old" Radio 5 signed off at midnight on Sunday 27 March 1994 with a pre-recorded Nigel and Earl sketch at the end of one of the network's Irish music magazine programme Across the Line. Ten minutes later, the frequencies closed down for the night following a BBC Radio News and Sport bulletin and the new BBC Radio 5 Live began its 24-hour service at 5:00 am on Monday 28 March.

== Programming ==
The station was on air daily from 6.00 am until just after midnight although initially, apart from sports coverage, original programming was restricted to key times of the day – breakfast, mid-mornings and on weekdays drive and evening programmes for young people. The rest of the day was filled with simulcasts of other BBC stations and with programmes from the BBC World Service, which were broadcast for several hours each day. World Service programmes were aired at 6.00 am, 11.00 pm and for two hours on weekday afternoons, BBC Radio 3 was broadcast on weekday lunchtimes, with BBC Radio 4 simulcast on Saturday evenings, and on Sunday lunchtime and teatime. BBC Radio 1 and BBC Radio 2 were also simulcast on Sundays – Radio 2 in the afternoon when there was no sports coverage and Radio 1 during the early evening during the Open University's 1990/91 winter break.

From spring 1991, the station started to expand its original programming and this replaced the rebroadcasting of programmes from other BBC networks. The first to be discontinued, at the end of March 1991, was the 11.00 pm World Service block, followed in autumn by the simulcasts of other BBC stations, and May 1992 saw the removal of the weekday afternoon block of World Service programmes. This meant that, from this point, the station was now producing its own programming every day from 6.30 am until just after midnight. The 6.00 am World Service news bulletin simulcast remained throughout the station's time on air.

The new network allowed the BBC to significantly enhance its sports coverage, especially in its later years. For example, during the 1992 Barcelona Olympics, the network devoted its entire output to the event and during the summer months, sports coverage was broadcast all afternoon every day of the week.

=== Weekdays ===
- Morning Edition – with Sarah Ward, Jon Briggs, Danny Baker and Michele Stephens
- This Family Business and The AM Alternative – with Johnnie Walker
- The Health Show – with Angela Rippon
- Sound Advice – with Guy Michelmore, Daire Brehan and Liz Barclay
- The Crunch – with Liz Kershaw
- BFBS Worldwide
- Sportsbeat – with Ross King and Tommy Boyd
- A Game of Two Halves – with John Inverdale, Frances Edmonds, Caron Keating and Mark Kermode
- Five Aside – with Sue McGarry and Julian Worricker
- John Inverdale's Drive-in

=== Weekends ===
- On Your Marks – with Mark Curry
- Get Set – with Steve Johnson
- Go! – with Ross King and Garth Crooks
- Sportscall – with Dominik Diamond
- Sunday Edition – with Barry Johnston
- Simon Fanshawe's Sunday Brunch
- Rod Lucas - On The Level (Saturday Nights)

=== Evenings ===
- Fabulous – with Mark Lamarr and Johnny Vaughan
- Fantasy Football League – with Dominik Diamond
- Trevor Brooking's Football Night
- 6-0-6 – with Danny Baker and David Mellor
- Formula Five
- Room 101 (later transferred to television)
- They Think It's All Over – with Des Lynam (later transferred to television)
- Cult Radio – with Marc Riley
- Le Top (a translated version of the French chart show on Europe 1)
- The Mix – with Mark Thomas
- Hit the North – with Mark Radcliffe and Marc Riley (who featured the first ever radio session from Oasis)
- Earshot – with John Cavanagh
- Eastern Beat
- Rave – with Rob Brydon
- Across the Line (produced by BBC Northern Ireland)
- The Mark Steel Solution (first series only)

== Presenters ==
- Danny Baker
- Liz Barclay
- Tommy Boyd
- Daire Brehan
- Jon Briggs
- Bruno Brookes
- Trevor Brooking
- Rob Brydon
- Garth Crooks
- Mark Curry
- Dominik Diamond
- Frances Edmonds
- Simon Fanshawe
- Simon Hickson
- John Inverdale
- Barry Johnston
- Caron Keating
- Mark Kermode
- Liz Kershaw
- Ross King
- Mark Lamarr
- Des Lynam
- David Mellor
- Guy Michelmore
- Trevor Neal
- Mark Radcliffe
- Miranda Rae
- Marc Riley
- Angela Rippon
- Mark Steel
- Johnny Vaughan
- Johnnie Walker
- Julian Worricker
