= Etsy =

E-commerce website focused on handmade or vintage items

Etsy, Inc.
- Type: Public
- Traded as: NYSE: ETSY; S&P 600 component; Nasdaq: ETSY (2015–2025)
- Industry: E-commerce
- Founded: June 18, 2005; 21 years ago
- Founders: Robert Kalin; Chris Maguire; Haim Schoppik; Jared Tarbell
- Headquarters: Brooklyn, New York City, United States
- Key people: Josh Silverman (CEO); Fred Wilson (chairman)
- Revenue: ▲US$2.88 billion (2025)
- Net income: ▼US$163 million (2025)
- Number of employees: 2,400 (2024)
- Subsidiaries: Depop; Reverb.com
- Website: etsy.com

Etsy, Inc. is an American e-commerce company focused on handmade or vintage items and craft supplies. Its marketplace includes categories such as jewelry, apparel, home decor, furniture, toys, and art. Items described as vintage must be at least 20 years old. The platform provides sellers with individual storefronts where they list their goods for a fee of US$0.20 per item. Since 2013, the company has allowed the sale of mass-manufactured items.

As of December 31, 2024, Etsy's marketplace contained more than 100 million active listings and connected 8 million sellers with 96 million buyers. At the end of 2024, Etsy had 2,400 employees. In 2024, Etsy had gross merchandise sales of US$12.6 billion, a revenue of $2.81 billion, and a net gain of $303 million.

The platform generates revenue from three streams. Marketplace revenue includes a 6.5% transaction fee on the final sale value and a listing fee of $0.20 per item. Seller Services include fees for services such as "Promoted Listings," payment processing, and the purchase of shipping labels through the platform. Other revenue includes fees received from third-party payment processors.

== History ==
=== 2005–2014 ===
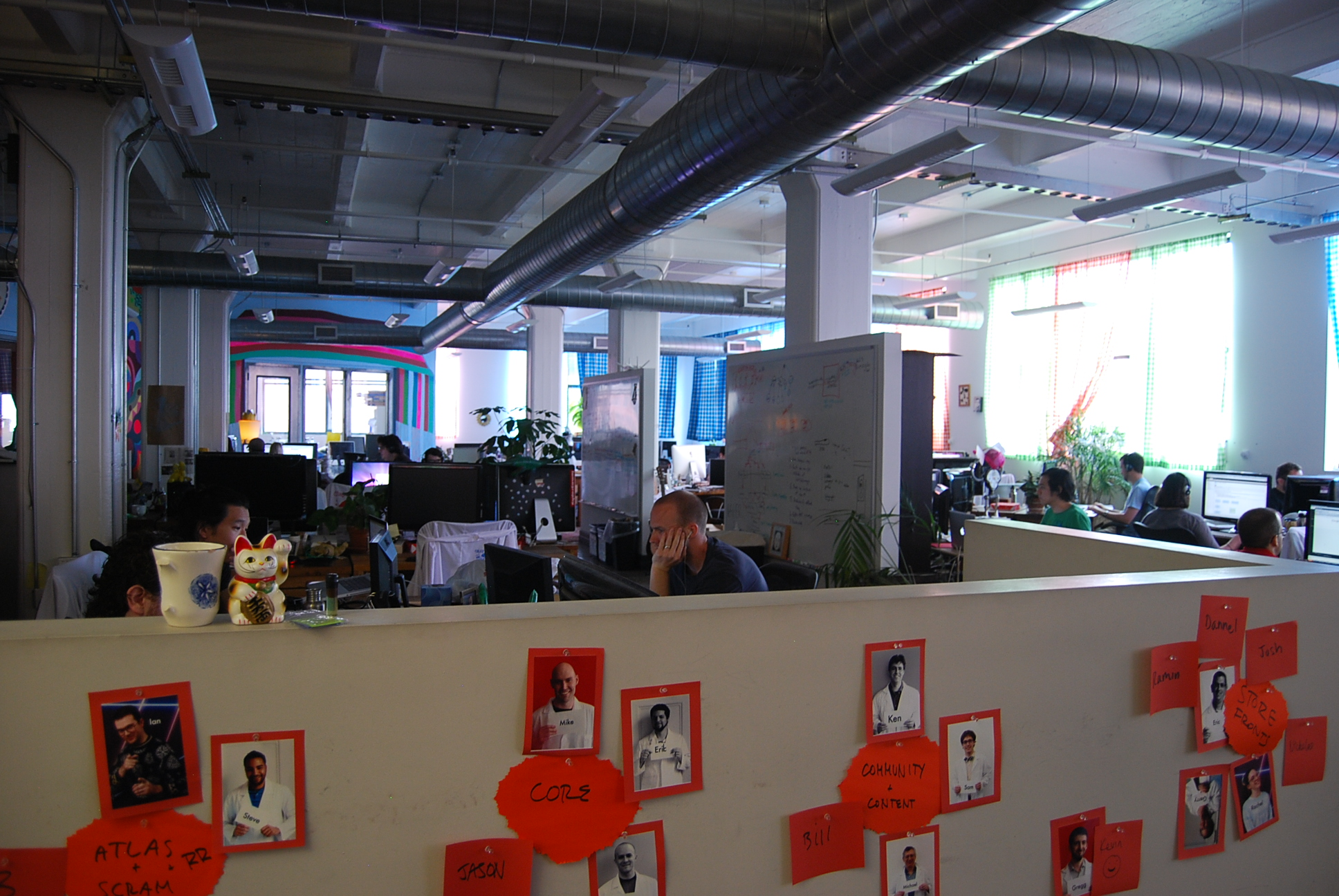
Etsy staff at work, July 2010

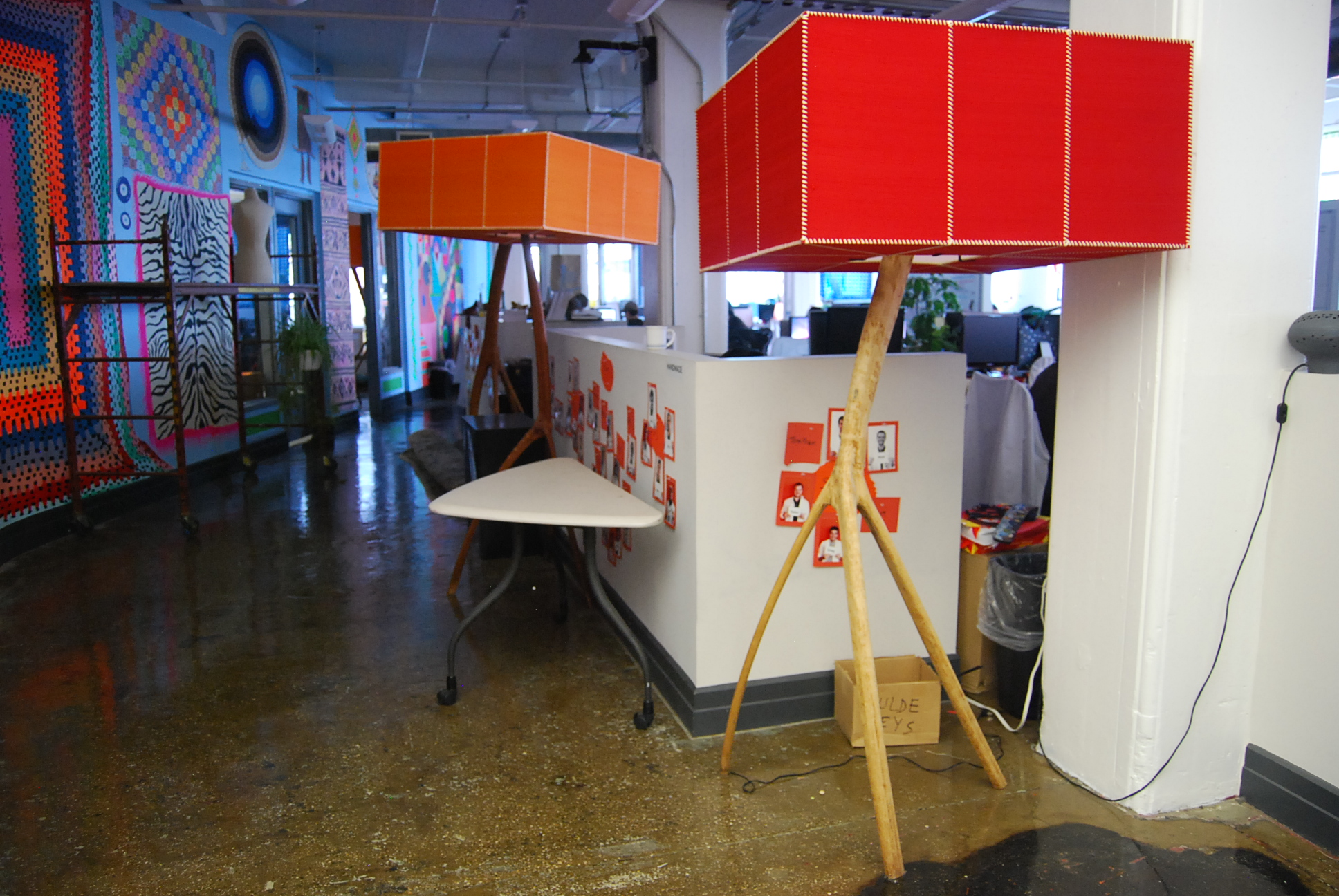
Art in the Etsy office in Brooklyn

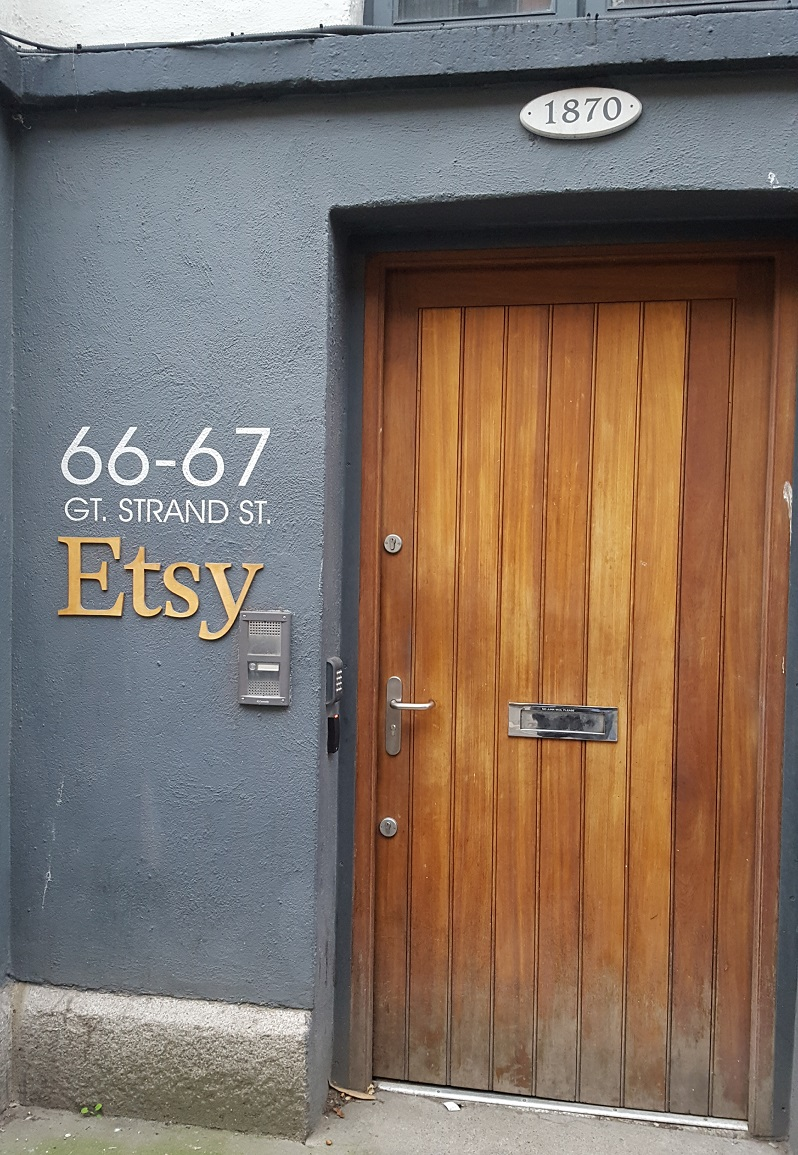
Etsy office in Dublin

The site was launched in 2005 by iospace, a small company composed of Robert Kalin, Chris Maguire, and Haim Schoppik. The initial version had taken two and a half months to build. Later, Jared Tarbell joined the team. Former NPR executive Maria Thomas joined as COO in 2008; she was then promoted to CEO before departing from Etsy in December 2009. Robert Kalin resumed his role as CEO from December 2009 until July 2011. Investors included Sean Meenan, Albert Wenger, Spencer and Judson Ain, Union Square Ventures, and founders of Flickr and Delicious.

Kalin explained why he named the site Etsy in a 2010 interview with Reader's Digest, saying, "I wanted a nonsense word because I wanted to build the brand from scratch. I was watching Fellini's 8 ½ and writing down what I was hearing. In Italian, you say etsi a lot. It means 'oh, yes'. And in Latin and French, it means 'what if'."

In Etsy's first year, it attracted attention for frequently adding new tools and functionality to the site to help sellers gain exposure and traffic, including Adobe Flash-based visualizations and a taxonomy of categories with tags. Etsy passed $1.7 million in sales in May 2007. On July 29, Etsy had its one-millionth sale and anticipated its two-millionth sale would occur mid-December 2007. In November 2007, buyers spent $4.3 million purchasing 300,000 items for sale on Etsy, an increase of 43 percent from October 2007. In June 2007, it expected to be profitable by the fall, but in December 2007 it was not a profitable company. In January 2008, Etsy received an additional $27 million in funding from Union Square Ventures, Hubert Burda Media, and Jim Breyer.

In February 2008, trouble at eBay, including a strike by some dissatisfied sellers, brought speculation that Etsy could be an increasing competitor. At the same time, however, some Etsy sellers expressed discontentment with how Etsy was handling complaints about stores. At the time, a comparison of the two websites included complaints that on Etsy, items are difficult to find, the interface "feels slow", and the buying and selling process is United States-centric. Other reviewers enjoyed using Etsy's specialized search options, including the "Shop Local" tool.

In July 2008, Rob Kalin ceded the position of CEO to Maria Thomas. Some longtime Etsy employees left the company in August 2008, including founders Haim Schoppik and Chris Maguire. In September 2008, Etsy hired Chad Dickerson, who formerly worked at Yahoo!, as Chief Technology Officer. The company acknowledged concerns about vendors selling other people's work as their own.

In April 2009, users organized an "etsyday" promotion on Twitter that brought extra attention to the site. As of May 2009, it had approximately 60 employees and sales of $10 to 13 million per month, possibly boosted by consumer interest in cheaper and more personalized goods due to the United States recession.

In March 2010, Kalin said that the company is profitable and "plans to go public, though not until at least next year". Financial statements required to be filed by Etsy in order to go public show that due to reinvestment of annually increasing gross profits in marketing, product development, and management, the company has not reported a net profit as of 2015.

In December 2010, Etsy said it had seven million registered users, and that it would continue to focus on a personal community feel as it grows larger, as that is part of what distinguishes it from eBay.

In March 2011, Etsy "introduced a Facebook-style social networking system called People Search...to help buyers and sellers connect with each other and become friends". By doing so, Etsy made any past purchase with feedback easily searchable, which caused many complaints. Etsy then made changes to the site to better guard information regarding users' purchases.

In July 2011, Chad Dickerson, CTO since September 2008, became CEO, upon the firing of Rob Kalin. Later CTOs were Kellan Elliot-McCrea and John Allspaw.

In April 2012, a newspaper article about Etsy covered its fraud detection efforts; Etsy had been criticized in the past for inconsistently applying its rules about items having to be handmade. Later in April 2012, the writer of Regretsy, a popular blog, did independent research into a specific featured vendor, Ecologica Malibu, and found evidence to accuse the vendor of being a reseller, which would be against the Etsy Terms of Service. The vendor asserted that it was in line with the Terms of Service, stating that the shop had simply failed to identify itself as a "collective" that included the work of several individuals, and many Etsy community members posted on the Etsy forum expressing unhappiness with the action (or lack of action) taken by Etsy. As of June 2012, the vendor's account is no longer active on Etsy.

In May 2012, Etsy raised $40 million in Series F funding, and announced the company had become a B Corp. This B Lab certification lapsed in 2017. Etsy's 2012 funds went towards expanding Etsy in international markets, including France, Germany, and Australia.

On October 1, 2013, Dickerson held an online Town Hall Meeting to announce that Etsy would now permit factory-made goods and drop shipping, provided the seller either designed or hired designers of the items, disclosed to Etsy their factory, disclosed that they used factories and took "ownership" of the process. In that meeting and afterward, Etsy claimed the meaning of the word "handmade" should be redefined to encompass factory made. Dickerson described the website as "a platform that provides meaning to people, and an opportunity to validate their art, their craft".

In June 2014, Etsy purchased A Little Market, a French e-commerce site for handmade goods, foods, and wine, for a mix of cash and stock valued at less than $100 million. At the time the acquisition was the company's largest.

=== 2015: IPO and investor lawsuit ===
On March 3, 2015, Etsy announced that it had filed for a $100 million IPO. As of 2015, Etsy generated transactions worth US$1.93 billion on its platform, which has 54 million members. Etsy went public on the Nasdaq on April 16, 2015, selling 13.3 million shares, while other stockholders including venture capital firms such as Accel and Acton Capital Partners were selling the rest. The company's valuation was $1.8 billion and raised $237 million in IPO proceeds. Less than a month later, Etsy stock dropped more than 8%. The stock closed at $30 on its first day of trading on April 16 and dropped down to $20.32 as of May 11.

Shortly after the IPO in 2015, a group of investors filed a class action lawsuit against Etsy claiming fraud. The suit claimed that Etsy's CEO and officers failed to disclose numerous problems with the site which could affect the stock price, among them that "more than 5 percent of all merchandise for sale on Etsy’s website may be either counterfeit or constitute trademark or copyright infringement" and that "brands are increasingly pursuing sellers on Etsy for trademark or copyright infringement, jeopardizing listing fees and commissions". The suit also claimed that Etsy management knew of the rampant trademark and copyright infringement but did little to stop it, and in fact worked to hide this information from potential investors.

=== 2016–present ===
In November 2016, Etsy disclosed that it paid US$32.5 million to purchase Blackbird Technologies, a startup that developed AI software used for shopping context/search applications. After experiencing a first-quarter loss in May 2017, Etsy replaced its chief executive and cut 8% of its workforce. In May 2017, Board member Josh Silverman was appointed CEO over Chad Dickerson, citing pressure from shareholders and poor profits.

In July 2019, Etsy acquired the music based marketplace Reverb for $275 million.

During the COVID-19 pandemic in 2020, shares in Etsy more than quadrupled. Equity analyst at D.A. Davidson Tom Forte stated the pandemic gave customers incentive to return to the website multiple times, rather than the usual occasional purchase of a unique product. Non-medical face masks accounted for around 11% of gross-merchandise sales in the third quarter, selling roughly 24 million.

On June 2, 2021, Etsy announced that it had agreed to acquire shopping app Depop, the fashion resell marketplace for $1.63 billion. Depop was later sold to eBay for $1.2 billion in 2026.

In most locations where Etsy Payments is not available, new shops are unable to on board to Etsy. As of April 26, 2021, most sellers opening new shops on Etsy are required to on board with Etsy Payments, which brings limitations on creating new shops in some countries.

In June 2022, Etsy announced the August launch of a purchase protection program for buyers and sellers. The company stated that an item that arrives damaged, does not arrive or does not match a description, will be refunded in full for the buyer. Etsy also reported it would invest $25 million to cover the refunds for cases where the seller is not at fault for item damage or loss.

In December 2023, Etsy laid off approximately 225 employees, or 11% of its workforce.

In January 2024, Etsy introduced "Gift Mode", powered by OpenAI GPT-4, which allows users to generate gift guides based on survey questions related to the recipient's demographic and interests.

On September 29, 2025, Etsy announced that it will switch its stock listing from Nasdaq to the New York Stock Exchange on October 10.

In October 2025, Etsy announced that it will promote Chief Growth Officer Kruti Patel Goyal to become Etsy's CEO starting January 1, 2026, ending Josh Silverman's eight years in the position. Silverman will become executive chair through the end of 2026.

In February 2026, Etsy announced that eBay would acquire its fashion resale marketplace Depop for approximately $1.2 billion. Etsy said the sale would allow it to focus on its core marketplace. At the end of 2025, Depop had approximately $1 billion in gross merchandise sales, 7 million active buyers and more than 3 million active sellers.

In July 2026, Etsy completed the sale of Depop to eBay. Etsy received approximately $1.4 billion in aggregate cash, consisting of the $1.2 billion purchase price plus $200 million in purchase price adjustments and interest. The following month Etsy announced plans to lay off approximately 220 employees, or about 12% of its workforce, as part of an organizational restructuring.

== Operations ==
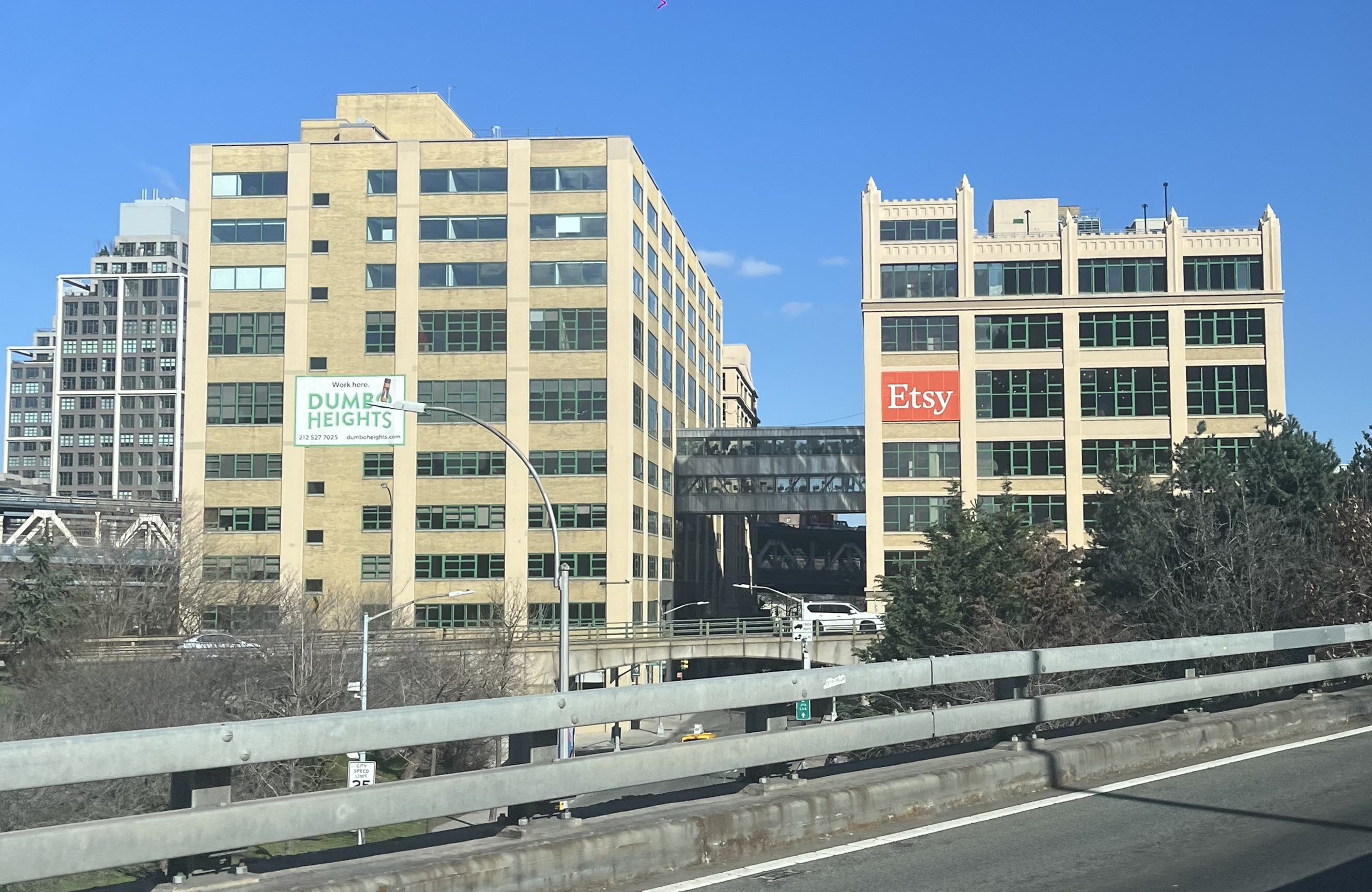
Etsy's headquarters in Brooklyn

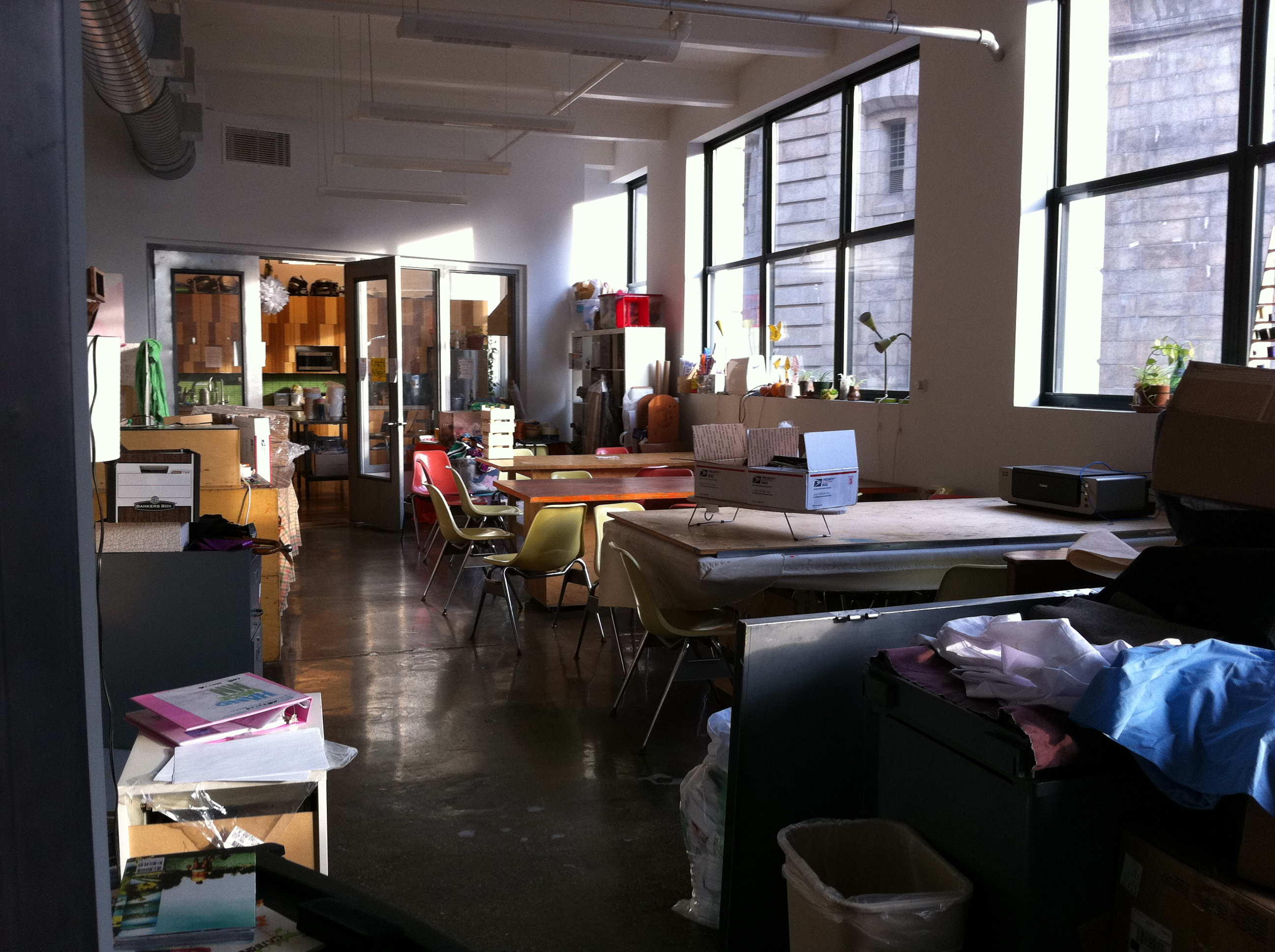
Etsy Labs community workspace area

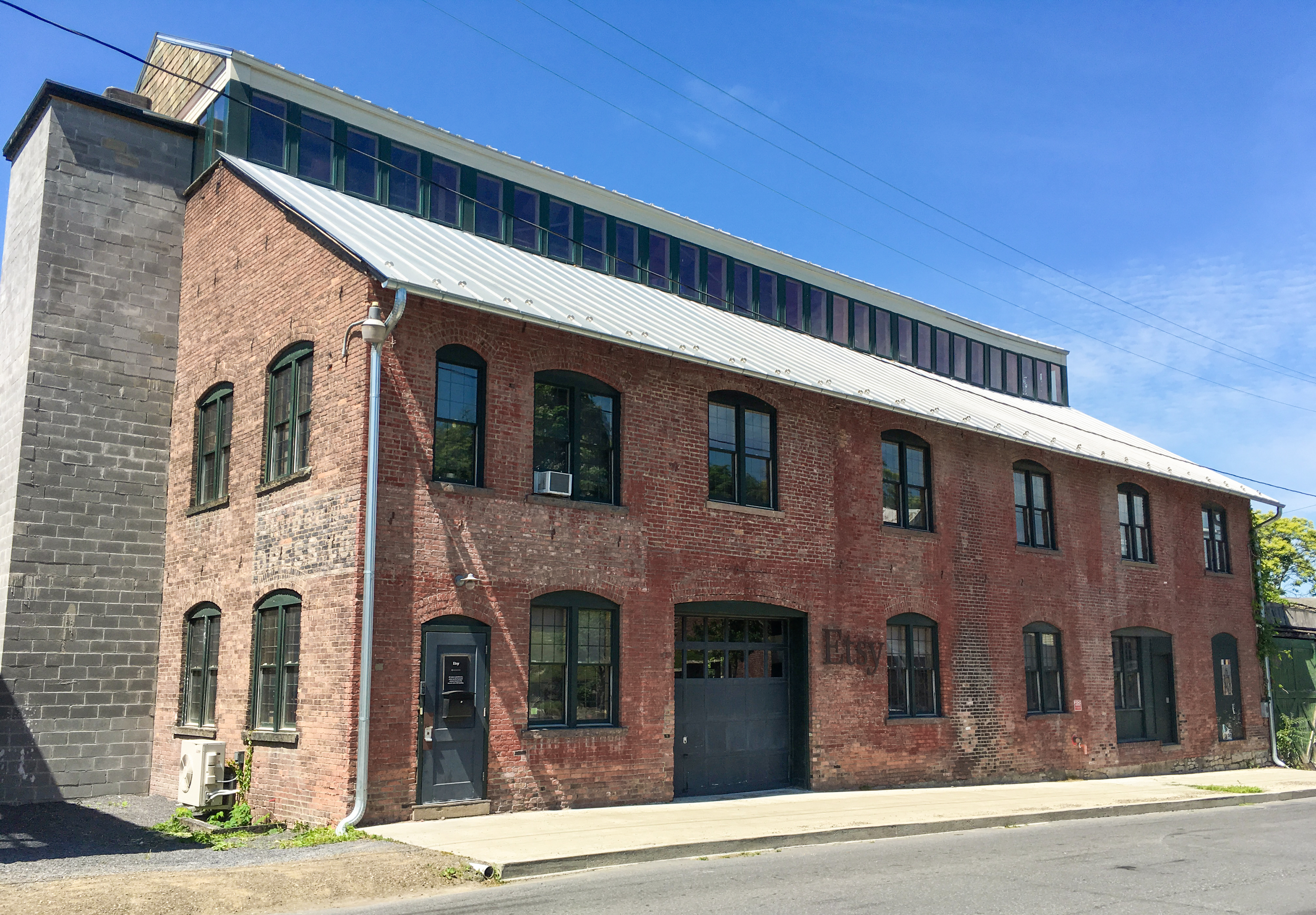
Office in Hudson, New York

Etsy is used by individuals as a part-time business and as a marketplace for handmade, vintage, or recycled goods, in addition to items that differ from mass-produced products. Many items on Etsy are handmade, vintage, or craft supplies. Product listings often include multiple photographs, and sellers can add up to 13 tags to their products to improve searchability. Buyers can choose to search for items available locally. Etsy staffers publish lists of featured items.

Most sellers are women, who tend to be college-educated and in their twenties and thirties. Individual Etsy sellers decide which payment options to offer buyers; these options may include credit card, cheque, money order, PayPal, bank transfer, and Etsy gift card.

Etsy sellers range from hobbyists to professional artists who use the site to make a living. According to artists who have developed their Etsy stores into their primary jobs, scaling up production of handmade items can require more than full-time work, especially during the holiday shopping season.

Etsy's main office is in Dumbo, Brooklyn, and it has hosted open crafting classes in the "Etsy Labs". The site's technology, customer support, marketing, PR, business, and communications teams operate out of this office. Etsy Labs has a workspace that provides equipment and donated materials, where members gather to make items, take and teach workshops, and attend special events. Etsy also has an office in Berlin. In April 2012 Etsy announced that it was taking steps to hire more women engineers to improve the gender balance of its team, as a website with majority women users but few women engineers. By 2019, 30 percent of Etsy's engineers identified as "women or non-binary", and more than 30 percent were people of color.

Etsy was one of the main members of the Handmade Consortium, a 2007 effort to encourage buying handmade holiday gifts. Etsy has partnered with the retail chain West Elm to sell some Etsy products in its stores. In December 2012, Etsy opened a temporary holiday storefront in SoHo, New York City. In 2019 the UK's first Etsy store was opened in Didcot, Oxfordshire. The store features more than 50 local makers & small businesses and an eco refill station, selling packaging free groceries including dry foods, toiletries, and cleaning products.

=== Selling ===
Creating a shop on Etsy requires creating and posting at least one listing in the shop, which costs $0.20. Each listing will remain on the shop's page for a maximum of four months, or until someone buys the product. The prices of products are set by the shop owner, but Etsy claims 6.5% of the final sale price of the listing and 6.5% of the postal fee.

Additionally, Etsy has mandatory offsite ad fees of 12% or 15%. If a shop is selling less than $10K per year, they can opt out of offsite ad fees. However, once their sales reach $10K per year, offsite ad fees become mandatory and a shop cannot opt out. When a buyer clicks on an offsite ad and purchases from a shop, the seller is charged that fee on everything that is purchased, as well as any other purchases the same buyer may make within the next 30 days. This fee is in addition to the listing fees, credit card processing fees, and commissions that are charged on all sales. These payment processing fees (handled via Etsy Payments) vary depending on the seller's bank location; for example, sellers in the United States are charged an additional 3% plus a $0.25 flat rate per transaction. Only shops that met the $10K in the last year threshold when this fee was first implemented are charged the lower 12% fee. Currently, all shops that reach $10K in sales for a twelve-month period are charged the higher fee of 15%. Shop owners are sent a bill at the end of every month detailing the fees Etsy has charged them, and they have until the 15th of the following month to pay the fees. Sellers can choose which payment options to offer buyers, including credit cards, debit cards, and PayPal, among others.

=== Buying ===
On the Etsy homepage, potential buyers can type a "product description" into the search bar, or they can "browse" through a list of options, which includes Art, Home & Living, Jewelry, Women, Men, Kids, Vintage, Weddings, Craft Supplies, Trending Items, Gift Ideas, Mobile Accessories, and more. Furthermore, buyers may choose from a list of categories by clicking on the "categories" link under "More Ways to Shop". This will bring the user to a page of more than 30 categories, each containing subcategories.

When a buyer views a product, they can choose to view the positive feedback of each seller to determine the reliability of the shop. Once a buyer finds a product they would like to buy, they click "Add to Cart", and that product is added to their virtual "Shopping Cart". The buyer may then either continue shopping or purchase the selected item. In order to purchase items, buyers do not have to have an account with Etsy and can instead register with Facebook, Google Account, Apple Account, or email.

Etsy has received criticism for its handling of customer data and privacy. As of 2016, the "Privacy Policy" section on the website reads: "By using Etsy, you authorise Etsy to use your information in the United States, Ireland and any other country where Etsy operates".

== Environmental impact ==
In 2008, Etsy received a B Corporation certification but later lost it in 2017. This certification was a recognition of the company abiding by transparent and accountable practices, which includes environmental practices. The environmental impact from depends greatly on the individual seller usage of wholesale retailer and large manufacturers. In Etsy's Supplier Code of Conduct, it states that sellers are obligated to follow environmental laws and regulations and that sellers must conduct business in a sustainable and responsible manner. Etsy's 2020 Climate Change Response outlines the company's annual plan for climate related issues and how it achieves the motto of "keep commerce human". In 2019, the board that oversees climate change at Etsy made a goal of becoming a carbon neutral company in 2020. To achieve this, Etsy is offering eco-friendly packaging to its sellers through a partnership with EcoEnclose. This provides sellers with the option to use certified 100% recycled packaging. Buyers are also given a carbon offsetting option when selecting shipping. Etsy, partnered with multiple companies including Apple, pledged to purchase 165 Megawatts of solar energy through Spotsylvania. By 2025, Etsy's goal is to reduce energy intensity by 25%.

In 2018, nearly 98% of its carbon impact came from the delivery of goods sold on its platform. Etsy reports that it offsets 100% of its carbon emissions from shipping. These offsets support several verified carbon reduction projects through their partnerships. For example, Etsy helps fund the UPM Blandin Native American Hardwoods Conservation Project, which conserves more than 187,000 acres of forest in Minnesota, absorbing CO_{2} and protecting biodiversity. Additionally, they invest in renewable energy initiatives like the Giriraj Wind Power Project in India and the Solar Grouped Project by ACME, which replace fossil fuel-based energy generation with wind and solar power. Etsy has also supported innovative projects such as the Meridian Magnesium SF6 Reduction in the automotive sector, which reduces the use of SF_{6}, a greenhouse gas 22,800 times more potent than CO_{2}.

In 2013, following pressure by the Snow Leopard Trust Etsy banned the sale of products made from endangered or threatened animals. Similarly, in April 2026, due to the efforts of the Coalition to Abolish the Fur Trade (CAFT), Etsy announced that it would be excluding items containing animal fur from its marketplace, beginning on August 11th, 2026.

== Competitors ==
As of March 2016, Etsy's top three competitors according to Hoovers Online are Amazon, Craigslist, and eBay. Etsy has been compared to "a crafty cross between Amazon and eBay", and to "your grandma's basement". Etsy also has a number of direct competitors. DaWanda, based in Germany, closed in August 2018, Druzza is a global competitor, Bonanza (formerly Bonanzle and 1000 Markets) is based in the United States and focuses on clothing and fashion, Zibbet and Made It which are based in Australia, iCraft is based in Canada, Artfire is based in the United States, and Moksi is an online craft marketplace targeted at South Africans, and offers unique African-made handcrafted goods and art. Tindie is based in Portland, Oregon, and focuses on technology and electronics. Apple Creek Lane, a Canadian-based online marketplace that focuses on health, fitness and wellness products. ArtYah, based in California, United States brought together sellers and consumers of handmade items, vintage and some craft supplies prior to closing in December, 2019.

Asked about competitors, Etsy's European CEO said, "As far as I am concerned, the more people highlighting the value of supporting micro-producers and buying handmade and vintage directly from them, the better."

== Seller issues ==
=== Privacy ===
In 2011, in an effort to add social networking features to Etsy, the company implemented features that allowed users to search other users' buying histories and to trace their purchasing transactions. Etsy thought this feature would allow Etsy users to connect to individuals with similar buying and/or selling histories and an automatic opt-in was applied to all users without the attainment of prior permission. Users of the service raised concerns over the feature's violation of privacy rights, but an official response was not released by the company.

=== Copyright infringement issues ===
In 2015, Etsy was involved in two major lawsuits. The first was from investors in Etsy who claimed the company had downplayed or even hid the scale of counterfeiting problems the marketplace was facing. Subsequently, musician Taylor Swift's legal representatives commented publicly on the number of Etsy users selling counterfeit or goods that infringed copyright. Beyonce was the second major musician to file a lawsuit against Etsy sellers, for similar reasons to Taylor Swift a year before.

Following the initial lawsuits early in Etsy's existence, it has continued to suffer with counterfeit and copyright issues. Many major companies started to protect IPs when fashion trends led to mass breaches of copyright, something highlighted in the Harvard Business Review in 2019. In 2020, Disney cracked down on counterfeit merchandise following the release of its successful TV series, The Mandalorian. In 2023, musician Harry Styles filed a suit against unauthorized merchandise, and The Smiley Company in the same year for breaches for the use of "smiley." The BBC then sued Etsy users for breaking copyright laws for the children's TV show Bluey.

Eight years after her original lawsuit, Taylor Swift's legal team again filed a lawsuit in 2023 after the copyright issues continued on the marketplace. Etsy also repeatedly failed to remove infringing items reported to them, including bootleg movies, music recordings, fonts, art and other digital downloads on their site.

=== Production outsourcing ===
On October 1, 2013, Etsy changed its policy to allow sellers to outsource production to third parties and factories and to use shipping or fulfillment services. The new rules allow products to be labeled "handmade" as long as the original idea for that item—or its "authorship", as the then CEO, Dickerson, said—comes from its respective seller. Further, the policy changes allow Etsy businesses to hire as many employees as they deem necessary (including workers in different locations) and allow sellers to ship orders via third-party couriers rather than the post office.

The move has prompted at least one Etsy competitor to distinguish itself by committing never to sell manufactured items.

In September 2015, Etsy made further changes to its manufacturing policy with the launch of Etsy Manufacturing, a marketplace allowing sellers to connect with outside manufacturers to fabricate their products. Manufacturers must be reviewed and approved by Etsy to ensure they adhere to certain criteria, although Etsy will not conduct visits or in-person inspections. Sellers must apply and be approved to work with any partners listed on Etsy Manufacturing and are required to disclose their use of outside manufacturers on their pages.

=== Advertising requirements ===
In February 2020, Etsy announced a new "risk free" product advertising program, replacing an existing system allowing sellers to purchase ads on platforms such as Google Shopping from within Etsy. The company will automatically purchase advertising for products on "high-traffic" websites. Actual product sales generated by this type of lead generation are subject to a 15% cut of revenue from the total of the purchase order. Etsy expected at least "1 in 10" leads to come from this online advertising. All sellers will be automatically opted into this program, but sellers with an annual revenue of $10,000 or higher will be subject to a 12% cut instead and are required to participate with no opt out. The system has faced criticism from sellers, who have characterized the new system as a means for the company to grab revenue from its sellers. However, Etsy has been celebrated for giving sellers the necessary support to turn their handmade hobby into a business. Etsy does this, by turning foundational business concepts into digital e-commerce processes.

=== Permanence of reviews ===
Etsy reviews are permanent, and Etsy does not fact-check reviews. Many sellers have complained about false or misleading statements in reviews.

=== Effects of banking sanctions ===
On March 10, 2022, due to banking sanctions, Etsy blocked accounts of all Russian customers including those living abroad and delisted all their goods, with the message of "Expanding business restrictions in the sellers' region".

=== Fake ‘handmade’ products ===
In April 2023 the UK Consumers' Association found that many items for sale on Etsy were also for sale at large retailers, including Amazon, Asda and the discount chain B&M, for much lower prices. In a sample of 192 products 23 were found to be available on other online platforms or retailers. Rocio Concha, director of policy and advocacy said, "Our research shows some Etsy sellers are brazenly ripping off customers by making misleading claims about their products".

=== Etsy treatment of sellers ===
In 2022, Etsy faced protests from sellers after raising transaction fees from 5% to 6.5%. In April 2022, a group of 5,000 sellers united to strike by taking their stores off line for a week in protest. The following year, Etsy placed reservations on seller accounts taking 75% of their takings on hold for 45 days without prior notice or explanation; the UK's Small Business Commissioner, Liz Barclay, said that "we hear that many sellers are women or minority groups and they need this money to pay the bills".

=== Bootleg recordings, fonts, art, and counterfeit merchandise ===
Etsy has also been permitting the sale of bootleg movies, music recordings, fonts, art and other digital downloads on their site, in addition to counterfeit merchandise. They have also repeatedly failed to remove infringing items reported to them.

=== 3D printing ===
In 2025, Etsy quietly updated its Creativity Standards policy in regards to which seller products qualify as handmade or original; these updated terms primarily affected 3D print sellers. While Etsy has not officially banned 3D printing, the company clarified that 3D printed products must be based on the seller's original designs; this determination placed thousands of current listings in violation of policy. The majority of 3D print sellers on Etsy's platform perceived that their products were covered by the "made by a seller" clause, as sellers 3D print items themselves.

== See also ==
- Vintage (design)
- Vintage clothing
- Tech companies in the New York City metropolitan region
