= List of Epic Records artists =

Epic Records is an American record label owned by Sony Music Entertainment.

An asterisk (*) after the artist's name denotes that the artist no longer records for Epic Records. They have managed various acts since their formation in 1953.

== 0–9 ==
- 220 Volt
- 3LW
- 3rd Avenue (SOLAR Records/Epic)
- 3T (MJJ Music/550 Music/Epic)
- 21 Savage (Slaughter Gang/Epic)

== A ==
- A*M*E
- Snoh Aalegra*
- ABBA (UK/Ireland/Israel/Italy)*
- AC/DC* (Albert/Epic)
- Ace Hood
- A. Chal*
- Adam Ant*
- After the Fire*
- The Afters*
- The Airborne Toxic Event
- Akeboshi (Japan)
- Alan Kuo (Sony/Epic/Columbia Malaysia)
- Alexandra Burke (US) (The X Factor UK contestant)
- Alexz Johnson
- Alizée
- Alkaline Trio (Active On Epitaph)
- Melanie Amaro (The X Factor USA, season 1, contestant)
- Tori Amos*
- Anastacia
- Anggun
- Andre 3000
- The Angels
- Apollo 440 (550 Music/Epic)
- Fiona Apple (Clean Slate/Epic)
- Aqua Timez (Japan)
- Arcade*
- Argent*
- Artms (US) (Modhaus/Epic)
- Aselin Debison
- Asian Kung Fu Generation (Japan)
- Asleep at the Wheel (Epic Nashville)
- Astrid Satriasari (Sony/Columbia/Epic Malaysia)
- Astro (The X Factor USA, season 1, contestant)
- Audioslave* (in association with Interscope Records)
- Augustana
- Automatic Loveletter*
- Aston Merrygold, Solo (Joint deal with Sony Music / RCA Records and Epic Records, 2009–present)
- Attila
- Azúcar Moreno

== B ==
- B*Witched (Glowworm/Epic)
- B2K (TUG/Epic)
- Baby D
- Babyface (Solar/Epic)
- Bad English
- Bad Religion
- Bakers Pink
- Bachelor Girl
- Charli Baltimore (Untertainment/Epic)
- Bamboo Shoots
- Band AKA
- Keith Barbour
- Bardo
- Sara Bareilles
- The Barron Knights
- John Barrowman (UK)
- Basia
- Beam
- Beau Nasty (WTG/Epic)
- Jeff Beck (US/Canada, then worldwide)
- Natasha Bedingfield (US/Canada) (Photogenic/Epic)*
- Madison Beer
- Randy Bell
- Stephanie Bentley (Epic Nashville)
- Yung Berg
- Bia
- Biddu
- Big Boi
- Blac Youngsta (Epic/CMG/Heavy Camp)*
- Black Eyed Peas
- Black Sabbath
- Ginny Blackmore (New Zealand Artist)
- Blondie (Outside US/Canada)
- Colin Blunstone
- Bobby Shmurda*
- James Bonamy (Epic Nashville)
- Bone Thugs-n-Harmony (Ruthless/Epic)
- Bonham (WTG/Epic)
- Boston
- Boxer
- Box of Frogs
- Boy George (More Protein/Epidrome) (Central Europe)
- Brad
- Tamar Braxton*
- Ally Brooke (Active on Interscope)
- Peter Brown
- Brownstone (MJJ Music/Epic)
- Brownsville Station a.k.a. Brownsville (Epic)
- Ray Bryant
- Celeste Buckingham (Herself/Epic)
- Bernard Butler
- Jerry Butler
- Alexandra Burke (US) (The X Factor UK contestant)
- Bonnie McKee (Kemosabe/Epic)*

== C ==
- Camila Cabello*
- Cam'ron (Untertainment/Epic)
- Candyman
- Marcus Canty (The X Factor USA contestant)
- Cappadonna (Razor Sharp/Epic)
- Mariah Carey*
- Cartel
- Cash Cash (Ultra/Epic)
- Cash Out (Bases Loaded/Epic)
- Cha Cha
- Keshia Chanté
- Tina Charles
- Charlie Daniels Band (Epic Nashville)
- Bill Chase
- Cheap Trick
- Chevelle*
- Bill Chinnock
- Christie
- Chris Bender
- Ciara*
- Cidade Negra
- Gigliola Cinquetti
- John Cooper Clarke
- Stanley Clarke
- The Clash
- Cleopatra
- George Clinton (550 Music/Epic)
- Cobra
- Tammy Cochran (Epic Nashville)
- Keyshia Cole
- Compton's Most Wanted
- Sarah Connor
- Alice Cooper
- Brad Cotter (Epic Nashville)
- The Cover Girls
- Beverley Craven
- Creed (Wind-Up/Epic) (outside US)
- Cry Before Dawn
- Bobbie Cryner (Epic Nashville)
- Culture Beat (550 Music/Epic)
- Culture Club (Virgin/Epic) (US)
- Cycle Sluts from Hell

== D ==
- The D.E.Y.
- Kat Dahlia (Vested In Culture/Epic)
- The Damnwells (Epic/Rounder)
- Danger Danger (Imagine/Epic)
- Clint Daniels (Epic Nashville)
- The Dave Clark Five (US)
- John Davis & the Monster Orchestra
- Linda Davis (Epic Nashville)
- Darryl & Don Ellis (Epic Nashville)
- Howie Day
- DJ Khaled (We the Best/Epic)*
- The Daylights
- Rey de la Torre
- Dead or Alive
- Dead Sara*
- Death Grips*
- DDG (DDG Entertainment/Epic)
- Aselin Debison
- Jessie James Decker (Epic Nashville)
- DeeJay Punk-Roc (Independiente/Epic)
- Deep Forest
- Kat DeLuna
- Demi Lovato
- Design
- Des'ree (550 Music/Epic)
- Joe Diffie (Epic Nashville)
- Dimitri Vegas & Like Mike (smash the house)
- Celine Dion (US/Japan) (550 Music/Epic)
- Disciple
- Dis-n-Dat (Epic Street)
- Divine Council
- Divine Styler (Rhyme $yndicate/Epic)
- Dixiana (Epic Nashville)
- Doe Boy (Epic/Freebandz/RMBG Records)
- Don Broco
- Donovan (outside UK/Ireland)
- Dope
- Downplay
- Mike Douglas
- Drake (rapper)
- George Duke
- Dreamcatcher (Dreamcatcher Company/Sony Music Entertainment Korea (Asia Pacific)/Epic (US/Canada))
- Duran Duran

== E ==
- Eazy-E (Ruthless/Epic)
- Eddie Benjamin
- Editors
- Eighteen Visions
- Electric Light Orchestra
- Elf
- Gloria Estefan/Miami Sound Machine
- Europe
- Evanescence (Wind-up/Epic)
- Jace Everett (Epic Nashville)
- Eve's Plum (550 Music/Epic)
- Example (Elliot John Gleave)
- Exile (Epic Nashville)

== F ==
- Face To Face
- Fashion
- Paloma Faith
- Georgie Fame*
- Fatboy Slim (Skint/Epic) (Out of UK, US and Canada)
- Rebecca Ferguson (US) (The X Factor UK contestant)
- Fey
- Fieldy's Dreams
- Fifth Angel
- Fifth Harmony (Syco/Epic)
- Fight
- Tim Finn* (Europe)
- FireHouse*
- Five Star
- Flamin' Groovies
- Flash Cadillac & the Continental Kids
- Fleetwood Mac* (US/Canada)
- Flickerstick
- Flipp Dinero (Cinematic/Epic/We The Best)
- Nikki Flores
- Dan Fogelberg* (Full Moon/Epic)
- Ben Folds* (550 Music/Epic)
- Ben Folds Five* (550 Music/Epic)
- Freddie Foxxx (Flavor Unit/Epic)
- Franz Ferdinand (Domino/Epic) (outside Europe)
- The Fray
- Front 242
- Fuel
- Funkdoobiest (Immortal/Epic)
- Future (A1/Freebandz/Epic)
- French Montana (Epic/Bad Boy Entertainment/Coke Boys)

== G ==
- Rosie Gaines
- Amanda Ghost
- Ghostface Killah
- Gazo (BSB Productions/Epic Records France)
- Gibson/Miller Band (Epic Nashville)
- Mickey Gilley (Epic Nashville)
- Billy Gilman (Epic Nashville)
- Ginuwine
- Giveon
- G Herbo (Machine Entertainment Group/Epic/150 Dream Team/Cinematic)*
- G. Love & Special Sauce
- The Godfathers
- Bobby Goldsboro
- Good Charlotte (Daylight/Epic)*
- Delta Goodrem
- Got7 (Sony Japan)
- Grand Daddy I.U. (Cold Chillin'/Epic Street)
- Eddie Grant (Portrait/Epic)
- Macy Gray
- A Great Big World
- Adam Gregory
- LaShell Griffin
- Michael Grimm
- Groove Theory
- The Gun

== H ==
- Steve Hackett (Charisma/Epic) (US/Canada)
- Harold Melvin & the Blue Notes (Philadelphia International/Epic)
- Merle Haggard (Epic Nashville)
- Daryl Hall
- Roy Hamilton
- Happoradio (Epic Finland)
- Harlequin
- Jonn Hart
- Rolf Harris
- Annie Haslam (outside Japan)
- Richie Havens (Solar/Epic)
- Susan Haynes (Epic Nashville)
- Headie One
- The Head Shop
- Heart (Portrait/Epic)
- Heatwave
- Ty Herndon (Epic Nashville)
- Nick Heyward
- Bertie Higgins
- Hiroshima
- Roger Hodgson
- The Hollies (US)
- Clint Holmes
- Rupert Holmes
- Alonzo Holt
- Hooverphonic
- Jimmy "Bo" Horne
- Paul Horn
- James House (Epic Nashville)
- David Houston (Epic Nashville)
- Jennifer Hudson
- Bill Hughes
- Nipsey Hussle

== I ==
- Ikimono Gakari (Epic Japan)
- Im Jihoo (Sony Music Korea/Epic/Columbia Records)
- Imogen Heap
- Incubus (Epic/Immortal)*
- Indigo Girls*
- INXS (Burnett/Epic)*
- Iron Maiden (US)*
- The Isley Brothers*
- Idntt (US) (Modhaus/Epic)

== J ==
- J Hus
- JB Gill Solo
- The Jacksons
- La Toya Jackson (Private-I/Epic)
- Michael Jackson (MJJ/Epic)
- Rebbie Jackson
- Jam & Spoon
- The Jamies
- Jamiroquai
- Jean Michel Jarre
- Jefferson Airplane
- Mason Jennings
- Waylon Jennings (Epic Nashville)
- Amanda Jenssen
- Jim & Jesse (Epic Nashville)
- Jidenna (Wondaland Records)
- JLS (2009–present, with a joint deal with RCA Records) (The X Factor UK contestants)
- Jodeci
- Johnny Crash (WTG/Epic)
- Alexz Johnson
- Don Johnson
- France Joli
- The Jones Girls
- George Jones (Epic Nashville)
- Kent Jones (Epidemic/We the Best/Epic)
- Bando Jonez
- Alexis Jordan (Columbia/Epic)
- Jota Quest
- Judas Priest
- July
- June's Diary*
- The Juliana Theory

== K ==
- Kak
- Kaleidoscope
- Kah-Lo
- Kansas (Kirschner/Epic Associated)
- Karmin
- Katmandu
- Crystal Kay
- Tori Kelly
- Khia
- KC and the Sunshine Band
- Keb' Mo' (OKeh/Epic)
- The Kendalls (Epic Nashville)
- Kesington Kross (KES), (Epic/LaFace)
- Killer Dwarfs
- Kim Jae-hwan (WakeOne/Epic; Korean Released Only)
- Cheyenne Kimball
- King L (Lawless Inc./Epic)
- Carole King (Ode/Epic)
- Don King
- Justin King
- Sean Kingston
- The Kinleys (Epic Nashville)
- Kool DJ Red Alert (Epic Street)
- Kool G Rap (Cold Chillin'/Epic Street)
- Korn (Epic/Immortal)*
- Josh Krajcik (The X Factor USA Season 1 Contestant)
- Kreator
- Raja Kumari

== L ==
- Labelle
- Patti LaBelle (Philadelphia International/Epic)
- Leah LaBelle (I Am Other/Epic/So So Def)
- Shona Laing
- Lamb of God
- Miranda Lambert (Epic Nashville)
- Zara Larsson
- Lauren Jauregui* (Syco/Epic Records)
- Avril Lavigne *
- Cyndi Lauper (Portrait/Epic)
- Coco Lee (550 Music/Epic)
- Lemar
- Lenka
- Glenn Lewis
- Webster Lewis
- Life of Agony
- Live
- Living Colour
- Cher Lloyd* (Syco/Epic)
- Locnville
- Looking Glass
- Jennifer Lopez
- Lorentz & M.Sakarias
- Los Lonely Boys (Or/Epic)
- Lostprophets *
- Lil Louis
- The Love Unlimited Orchestra
- Lovehammers
- Patty Loveless (Epic Nashville)
- Lene Lovich (Stiff/Epic) (US/Canada)
- Low vs Diamond
- Lulu
- Shelby Lynne (Epic Nashville)
- Louis Tomlinson
- Lil Loaded

== M ==
- Madison Beer
- Måneskin
- M People (US)
- Sho Madjozi
- Louise Mandrell (Epic Nashville)
- Manic Street Preachers
- Mansun*
- Margot & the Nuclear So and So's
- Marshanda (Sony/Epic/Columbia Malaysia)
- Brad Martin (Epic Nashville)
- Marvin and Tamara
- Mashmakhan
- Matisyahu (Or/JDub/Epic)
- Charly McClain (Epic Nashville)
- The McCoys
- George McCrae
- Ronnie McDowell (Epic Nashville)
- Malcolm McLaren
- MC Eiht (Epic Street)
- MC Ren (Ruthless/Epic)
- Meat Loaf (Cleveland International/Epic)
- Randy Meisner
- Melanie B
- Meliah Rage
- Menudo
- Metro Boomin*
- George Michael (outside U.S. and Canada)
- Midi Maxi & Efti
- Mind Funk
- Mimi Webb
- Mindless Behavior
- Sal Mineo
- Liza Minnelli
- Jody Miller (Epic Nashville)
- Kate Miller-Heidke
- AJ Mitchell
- MFSB
- Modest Mouse
- Don Moen (Integrity/Epic)
- Molly Hatchet
- Mandy Moore (550 Music/Epic)
- Melba Moore
- Jane Morgan
- Motörhead
- Monsta X*
- Mtume
- Mudvayne
- Michael Martin Murphey (Epic Nashville)
- Molly Santana

== N ==
- N.W.A* (Ruthless)
- Nantucket
- Johnny Nash
- Nayobe (WTG/Epic)
- Nena
- New Hollow
- New Musik
- Nexus
- The Nolans
- John Norum
- Brandy Norwood
- Ted Nugent

== O ==
- The O'Jays (Philadelphia International/Epic)
- Oasis (North America/Japan/Brazil)*
- Billy Ocean
- October Project
- Oh Land
- Mike Oldfield (Virgin/Epic) (US)
- Olly Murs (The X Factor UK contestant)
- Omarion
- The Only Ones
- Open Air Stereo
- Orchestral Manoeuvres in the Dark
- Kelly Osbourne
- Ozzy Osbourne*
- Outkast (LaFace/Epic)

== P ==
- Pages
- Keith Palmer (Epic Nashville)
- Paloma Faith
- Papa Winnie
- Park Je-up (KH Company/Sony Music/Epic Malaysia)
- Ronan Parke
- Jaco Pastorius
- Patra
- Billy Paul
- Jake Paul
- Owen Paul
- Sara Paxton
- Johnny Paycheck (Epic Nashville)
- Peach Union (USA/Canada/Central America)
- Pearl Jam
- Pegasus
- Teddy Pendergrass
- Petra (Word/Epic)
- Phantom Planet
- The Photos
- Pink Cream 69
- Poco
- Colt Prather (Epic Nashville)
- Prong
- Puffy AmiYumi (Epic Japan)

== Q ==
- Q
- Quarterflash
- Finley Quaye
- Quietdrive
- Quiet Riot (Pasha/Epic)
- Quo (MJJ Music/Epic)

== R ==
- Rage Against the Machine
- Ram Jam
- Razorback (US/Canada)* (Filipino rock band)
- Jon Randall (Epic Nashville)
- Shabba Ranks
- Lou Rawls
- Collin Raye (Epic Nashville)
- Matthew Raymond-Barker
- Real Boston Richey
- Red
- Redbone
- Riff Regan
- The Remains
- Chris Rene (Syco/Epic) (The X Factor USA contestant)
- REO Speedwagon
- Revis
- Charlie Rich (Epic Nashville)
- Cliff Richard (US)
- Minnie Riperton
- Riverdogs
- Rock Star Supernova (Burnett/Epic)
- The Rockfords
- Johnny Rodriguez (Epic Nashville)
- Ronnie Rogers (Epic Nashville)
- Rick Ross*
- Ricky Nelson*
- Rowdy Rebel (GS9/Shmoney Ent/Epic)
- Rush (Japan)
- Ruth Sahanaya (Sony/Epic Malaysia)
- Carl Hancock Rux (550 Music/Epic)
- Tim Ryan (Epic Nashville)
- The RZA (Razor Sharp/Epic)

== S ==
- The S.O.S. Band
- Sade (Portrait/Epic)
- Saga (Portrait/Epic)
- Sailor
- Morgan Saint
- Ryuichi Sakamoto
- Sanctuary
- Sarai
- Save Ferris
- Joe Satriani
- Jill Scott (Hidden Beach/Epic)
- Travis Scott
- Scouting for Girls
- Screaming Trees
- The Script
- Semi Precious Weapons
- Sepultura
- Serhat
- Shakin' Stevens
- Shakira*
- The Shamen
- Shark Island
- Vonda Shepard (550 Music/Epic)
- Sherbet
- Sho Madjozi
- The Shooters (Epic Nashville)
- Pauly Shore (WTG/Epic)
- Shudder to Think
- Horace Silver
- Silverchair
- Juliet Simms
- Carly Simon
- Jessica Simpson*
- The Sinceros
- Sister Souljah
- Ricky Skaggs (Epic Nashville)
- Skank
- Skunk Anansie
- Sly and the Family Stone
- Russell Smith (Epic Nashville)
- Snootie Wild (CMG/Epic)*
- Social Distortion
- Sons of the Desert (Epic Nashville)
- Southside (Southside Productions/Epic/808 Mafia)
- Southside Johnny & The Asbury Jukes
- Sounds Under Radio
- Spinall
- Spin Doctors
- Spirit (Ode/Epic)
- Joe Stampley (Epic Nashville)
- Starcastle
- Keith Stegall (Epic Nashville)
- Jim Steinman
- Tate Stevens (The X Factor USA contestant)
- Al Stewart
- Doug Stone (Epic Nashville)
- The Stranglers
- Suede
- Suicidal Tendencies
- Donna Summer
- Henry Lee Summer
- Super Furry Animals
- Christy Sutherland (Epic Nashville)
- Billy Swan (Epic Nashville)
- ScarLip

== T ==
- Tall Stories
- Mikha Tambayong (Sony/Epic/Columbia Malaysia)
- Tanto Metro and Devonte (550 Music/Epic)
- Les Taylor (Epic Nashville)
- Livingston Taylor
- Tears for Fears
- Tease
- Teeflii
- Teena Marie
- Tenacious D
- Tony Terry
- The The
- Natasha Thomas
- Bella Thorne
- Melanie Thornton
- The Three Degrees
- Three Fish
- Thunderbugs
- Tight Fit
- TLC (LaFace/Epic)
- Tokio Hotel
- Toploader
- Meghan Trainor
- The Trammps
- The Tremeloes (CBS in Europe)
- A Tribe Called Quest* (Jive/Epic)
- The Tourists (US/Canada)
- Trading Yesterday
- Tyla
- Tyla Yaweh
- TripleS (US) (Modhaus/Epic)
- Trainwreck
- Travis Scott (Cactus Jack Records/Epic/Grand Hustle)
- T.I. (Grand Hustle/Epic)*

== U ==
- Hikaru Utada
- USA European Connection
- U.P.O.
- Ultraspank
- Uncle Murda
- Union J (The X Factor UK contestants)

== V ==
- Steve Vai
- Luther Vandross
- Stevie Ray Vaughan
- Vedera
- Vendetta Red
- Verbow
- Vicious
- Diana Vickers
- The Village Stompers
- Jasmine Villegas
- Vinny Cha$e
- Bobby Vinton
- VL Mike

== W ==
- Butch Walker
- Wallpaper
- Watch the Duck
- Gene Watson (Epic Nashville)
- We Are Toonz
- Derek Webb
- Wham! (except US/Canada)
- The White Tie Affair
- Barry White
- "Weird Al" Yankovic
- Vanessa White (Epic US/Taiwan)
- Wild Cherry
- Wild Horses (Epic Nashville)
- Marty Wilde
- Will To Power
- Gretchen Wilson (Epic Nashville)
- Edgar Winter
- Brenton Wood
- Wolfgang (US/Canada)* (Filipino rock band)
- Link Wray
- Betty Wright
- Tammy Wynette (Epic Nashville)

== Y ==
- The Yardbirds (US)
- Yellow Magic Orchestra
- Yeum Myongwoo (Sony Music/Columbia/Epic Records, Korean releases only)
- YUKI
- Yung Berg
- Yo Gotti (CMG/Epic)*

== Z ==
- Zaya
- Zipper Club
- Zerobaseone (WakeOne/Epic, Korean releases only)
