= The Learning Curve (radio series) =

British radio programme

The Learning Curve is a Radio 4 current affairs series on the topic of British education, running from 1998 to 2008.

== History ==
The series Brainwaves was presented by Margaret Percy, produced by Simon Major, was an education magazine series on Radio 4 from 17 August 1985, but often looked at social policy of education instead. The last edition was in October 1986.

=== Former programme ===
Libby Purves had presented the weekly Radio 4 education magazine series Education Matters, from 11 April 1994 at 11pm on Mondays, produced by Sally Kirkwood, which had moved from the former Radio 5.

This programme had started in March 1987, being presented by Susan Marling, who also presented Feedback, with Maureen O'Connor in 1988, and Mike Baker in 1990. It was produced by Jenny Lo, Merilyn Harris, Beatrice Rubens, Clare Csonka and Jeremy Orlebar. This programme moved to the new Radio 5 in August 1990, with presenter Wendy Jones, and Helen Madden from September 1991.

On Radio 4 from 1994, this programme was later presented by Max Easterman from June 1995, Judy Merry from October 1995, Diana Appleyard from October 1996, Philippa Dolley from December 1996, David Walter from June 1997, and Mike Baker from March 1998. Clare McGinn produced from October 1996, and Anne Freeman from January 1998. The last edition was on 23 March 1998.

=== The Learning Curve ===
The first programme was at 4pm on Tuesday April 7, 1998; it was followed by Shop Talk, a business programme with Heather Payton.

It was originated by Clare McGinn (who herself studied American Literature from 1988 to 1992 at the University of East Anglia), who is now responsible for BBC Radio's podcasts.

The last programme was on Monday 17 November 2008.

Libby Purves wrote for the TES, often on policy of education, which is reflected in the character of the programme; in 2007, a compendium of this was published as A Little Learning: Broodings from the back of the class. Purves herself took her son and daughter out of state education, from Knodishall primary school, and into the independent Royal Hospital School, a Suffolk traditional boarding school.

It was introduced with a large shake up of the Radio 4 schedule. Radio 4's budget was now £42m, and all programmes for children were all dropped, as James Boyle said that 'they did not work'. Radio 4 had lost 200,000 listeners in the last three months of 1997. Case Notes also replaced Medicine Now, presented by Graham Easton.

== Structure ==
The weekly programme was thirty minutes and involved interviews with three to four sets of guests. The programme interviewed vice-chancellors of universities.

=== Presentation ===
Some editions were also presented by Daire Brehan in August 1998, and July 1999; Winifred Robinson in July 2000, July 2001, and February 2002; Diana Madill in July 2002; and Liz Barclay in October 2006 and July 2008.

== Content ==
The programme did look largely at the peripheral, or wider, parts of education, such as social or employment policies being deployed in the world of education, than the day-to-day intricacies of education. It would be similar to the situation if Radio 4's Inside Health discussed general social policies, often found in the world of health care, instead of worthwhile tactics of surviving illness. Radio 4's Inside Health largely discusses illness, and in great depth, than the types of social policy commonly found in the culture of British hospitals. It would be like discussing the colour of paint found inside British hospitals, than hideous illnesses. The programme tended to address the wider culture found in British education, than, perhaps, the best strategy of acquiring enough worthwhile qualifications.

=== Production ===
A former producer was Dorothy Stiven, a former Scottish actress who later worked at Teachers TV, and had worked at the TES in the late 1990s as a journalist.

It was also produced by Anne Freeman, Clare Csonka, Maud Hand, Dorothy Stiven, Rebecca Nicholson, Penelope Gibbs, Sukey Firth, Elaine Walker, Jayne Edgerton, Tony Phillips, Rebecca Moore, Pauline Moffatt, Sarah Tempest, Katy Hickman, Lucinda Montefiore, Fiona Hill, Louise Corley and Lyn Webster Wilde.

== Editions ==
=== 1998 ===
- June 23, the Belfast School of Music
- October 20, Chris Woodhead answered questions about Ofsted from parents and teachers

=== 1999 ===
- May 4, neuropsychologist Brian Butterworth discussed his book 'The Mathematical Brain', and whether mathematical ability was mostly inherited through genetics, a situation in which he strongly believed
- May 18, Anniesland College, an FE college in north-west Glasgow
- June 8, whether citizenship lessons would improve race relations
- June 22, discussing the provision of sex education with single mothers
- June 29, healthy eating

=== 2000 ===
- June 6, whether universities had a known lack of pastoral care

== See also ==
- Research in the Classroom, from October 1969, BBC Radio 3, presented by Willem Van der Eyken, produced by Judith Walton, and repeated in May 1970
- New Horizons, BBC1 Schools and Colleges series about the workings of British education, such as universities, in the early 1970s
- Education Matters, on BBC1 from February 1980, presented by Adam Hopkins, directed by Paula Gilder, produced by Jenny Rogers
- Education Today, 1988 World Service series
- The Learning World, World Service series from October 1989 to October 1998, presented by John Turtle and Daire Brehan
- Clean Slate, presented by Jackie Spreckley, the wife of architectural historian Simon Inglis, with Jill Cochrane (of the former Southern Television), on BBC2 and BBC1 from November 1989, produced by Jeremy Orlebar and Bernard Adams, later presented by Mike Baker and John Buckley from October 1990, when produced by Clare Brigstocke
- Just One Chance, presented by Carol Vorderman and Martin Bashir from October 1997 on BBC2, with a greater look at day-to-day teaching, and with much scrutiny, and the opportunities that education presented, than knowing about the social policy of education, produced by Hilary Rosen
