= Depop =

British social shopping app

Depop Limited
- Company type: Subsidiary
- Available in: English, Italian
- Founded: 2011; 15 years ago in Roncade, Italy
- Headquarters: London, United Kingdom
- No. of locations: London; Milan; Los Angeles; New York City
- Area served: Worldwide
- Founder: Simon Beckerman
- CEO: Peter Semple
- Industry: Online shopping
- Employees: 400 (2021)
- Parent: eBay
- Website: depop.com
- Users: ▲56.3 million (2026)

Depop Limited is a social e-commerce company headquartered in London, with offices in Milan and New York City. The company operates an online marketplace that allows users to buy and sell primarily second-hand, vintage, and designer clothing through a social media-style platform.

== History ==
Depop was founded in 2011 by entrepreneur Simon Beckerman at an Italian technological incubator and business start-up centre, H-Farm. Beckerman came up with the original outline of the application during his time working on PIG, a fashion magazine based in Italy that he co-founded. The idea was to create a platform where products shown in the magazine could be purchased by users online. This idea turned into a concept similar to a flea market but on the internet, where people could sell their items while also being in control of advertising, public relations, and the creative process behind their accounts. While being financially supported by H-Farm, Beckerman worked within a team to create and lay out the Depop application while exposing it to numerous investors.

In 2013, Beckerman became a member of the company's board to help improve the application and business while concurrently ceding his role of CEO. Maria Raga, Depop's co-founder and former CEO, took on the role of vice president of operations in 2014, and in 2016, she became chief executive. According to Raga, the main goal while developing Depop was to become the next Airbnb or Spotify, but to make an impact on fashion.

Paolo Barberis and Nana Bianca were two of the first investors in the platform in 2012 with a seed investment. Its headquarters were moved to London in 2012. Depop expanded and opened additional offices in Milan and New York City. Beckerman raised €1 million in funding in October 2013 from Red Circle Investment and brought on Faroese Runar Reistrup as new CEO. In 2015, Depop secured another investment of $8 million from Balderton Capital and HV Capital.

In March 2016, former CEO, Runar Reistrup, stated that Depop's growth was achieved through word of mouth. During his time as CEO, this growth involved taking Depop as a startup and working to raise funds to eventually amass a significant user base within the United States.

In June 2019, Depop raised $62 million in Series C from General Atlantic to fund its expansion. Previous investors HV Capital, Balderton Capital, Creandum, Octopus Ventures, TempoCap and Sebastian Siemiatkowski also participated. During this time, Depop held workshops and conversations as part of their Depop Live NY events, and the company also opened a London store through their partnership with Selfridges.

In 2020, Depop's gross merchandise sales and revenue both more than doubled to $650 million and $70 million respectively. This may be attributed to Depop's responsiveness to user trends, its lack of issues regarding inventory management, and the increase in users looking to resell.

As of 2024, Depop has over 35 million users, according to their website. Depop is popular for Gen Z and young millennials, it is the 10th most-visited shopping platform for Gen Z consumers in the US, and, in a poll conducted by The Strategist in 2019, Depop was voted by teenagers as their favorite resale website.

According to Etsy’s 2024 annual report, Depop was shown to have about 43.5 million users, 5.1 active buyers, and 2.3 million active sellers as of December 2024

=== Acquisition by Etsy ===
In June 2021, Depop was acquired by Etsy for $1.6 billion in cash, making it Etsy's most expensive acquisition. However, Depop continued to operate as a standalone brand independent from Etsy. This means that in addition to Depop keeping its existing team, the company retained its London location. At the time of acquisition, Etsy CEO Josh Silverman’s goal was to counteract the influx of buyers starting to go back to physical shops for their purchases. He saw Depop for its potential as a platform supporting a variety of products and creating a greater community of users. According to Silverman, Depop may expand and improve its services for its significant Gen Z user base. For Etsy, this acquisition maintains the company's foothold in the clothing industry and allows the company to expand its customer base to a younger demographic; at the same time, Depop was now able to make use of Etsy's company operations.

When Maria Raga relinquished her position as Depop's CEO in 2022, Etsy assigned the role to Kruti Patel Goyal, who was Etsy's former chief product officer and a leader there for eleven years. When Goyal was appointed president and chief growth officer for Etsy in May, Peter Semple, former chief marketing officer, was assigned CEO of Depop officially on August 1.

=== Acquisition by eBay ===
In February 2026, Etsy announced it had agreed to sell Depop to eBay for $1.2 billion in cash. The acquisition was completed in July 2026 following approval by the UK's Competition and Markets Authority (CMA).

== Business model ==
=== Selling ===
Depop operates as a marketplace and social platform, where users can follow friends and other influencers to view their buying and selling activities. Through the platform, users are able to sell branded and designer items, as well as vintage pieces. Depop users are also encouraged by the platform to use other social networking services such as Instagram to promote their shop profiles. Celebrities have resold their own items on Depop, with some donating proceeds to charitable causes.

Depop's user interface is modeled after that of Instagram. According to Depop, users who list and sell items provide their own photos with item descriptions. Users also note their designer items' authenticity and if they include any labels, tags, and receipts. These listings will appear in users' feeds. The platform's "Explore" page features items picked out by Depop staff.

According to Depop, purchases are made via Apple Pay, Google Pay, credit and debit cards, and Klarna. Depop payments stay in-app, allowing for the company to mediate disputes and process refunds. Depop payments allow sellers to directly receive their payments in their bank account. To get paid by Depop, a seller has to add a bank account and verify their identification by uploading an ID.

On July 18, 2024, Depop CEO Kruti Patel Goyal announced the removal of selling fees for US sellers, while maintaining a payment processing fee. This policy adjustment aimed to enhance seller revenue and support the growth of the second-hand market.

For sellers located in the UK, US, and Australia there is no 10% sellers fee, but they would still have to pay the processing fee. But as for someone who would reside outside of those regions than they would have to pay both the processing fee and the 10% sellers fee. (For payments in the UK it would be 2.9% + £0.30) (For payments in the US 3.3% + $0.45) (For sellers in Australia 2.6% + $0.30 AUD)

- UK: 2.9% + £0.30 per transaction
- US: 3.3% + $0.45 per transaction
- Australia: 2.6% + $0.30 per transaction

(https://depophelp.zendesk.com/hc/en-gb/articles/360001791127-Seller-fees-and-charges.com)

=== Buying ===
A Depop transaction includes the agreed sale price of the item, shipping fees, VAT or other applicable taxes and duties, and the marketplace fee for buyers in the U.S. or U.K. For international deliveries, packages may be subject to import taxes, customs duties, or fees, payable upon arrival or at checkout if Depop collects the tax on behalf of the buyer. For domestic purchases, relevant taxes may be collected by the seller or charged by the platform at checkout, ensuring no additional taxes are due upon delivery.

For users in Australia, the United Kingdom, and the United States, Depop allows users to receive a full refund if their item does not arrive, arrives damaged, or is considerably different from the original when the issue is reported within 30 days.

For Buyers In the UK,US, and Australia who buy in GBP (£) or USD ($) currency, there will be a marketplace fee that would be applied when you go to checkout to buy your item, this insures that they will be able to have:

- Depop Protection: (You’re safe in the knowledge that we’ve got your back if there’s an issue with your purchase (terms and exclusions apply).
- Customer support: We are dedicated to improving and growing our support capabilities, so you can buy with even more confidence.
- New features and improvements: We are increasingly investing in our platform to upgrade features, security and item discoverability.
- Community growth: Comprehensive marketing helps us to attract and connect you with new sellers globally, making it easier for you to discover your next unique find faster.

(https://depophelp.zendesk.com/hc/en-gb/articles/360001791127-Seller-fees-and-charges.com)

=== Competitors ===
As of June 2021, Depop's competitors include Vinted, a platform founded by Milda Mitkute and Justas Janauskas in 2008 and valued at €3.5 billion, as well as the U.S. resale site Poshmark, valued at $3.5 billion.

Additional competitors include Grailed, a peer-to-peer e-commerce site founded in 2014 that is recognized for its high-end second-hand menswear and streetwear, and Vestiaire Collection, a European resale app established in 2009 which specializes in authenticated pre-owned luxury items.

== Criticism ==
In February 2020, Jessica Hamilton, a Depop buyer, reported that she found many scammers on the platform. She noticed this issue after she attempted to purchase a Nintendo Switch from a seller who would suspiciously only accept payment through a direct bank transfer without buyer protection. Hamilton blamed the company for its lack of action and relaxed security measures compared to other e-commerce sites, which made the platform especially susceptible to hackers. Without a clear strategy for managing scams, Depop lost some users' trust because of its negligence.

In October 2020, some Depop buyers were tricked into paying sellers directly to bypass Depop's buyer protections, and the Depop sellers then sold those users' information on the dark web. In response, Depop claimed that it would improve security through mandatory password updates and multi-factor authentication.
