= Prather =

Prather may refer to:

- Prather (surname)
- Prather, California, an unincorporated community
- Prather, Indiana, an unincorporated community
- Prather Coliseum, a multi-purpose arena in Natchitoches, Louisiana
