= Enterprise Act =

Enterprise Act may refer to

- Enterprise Act 2002
- Enterprise and Regulatory Reform Act 2013
- Enterprise Act 2016
- South of Scotland Enterprise Act 2019
