= Design (band) =

UK vocal group

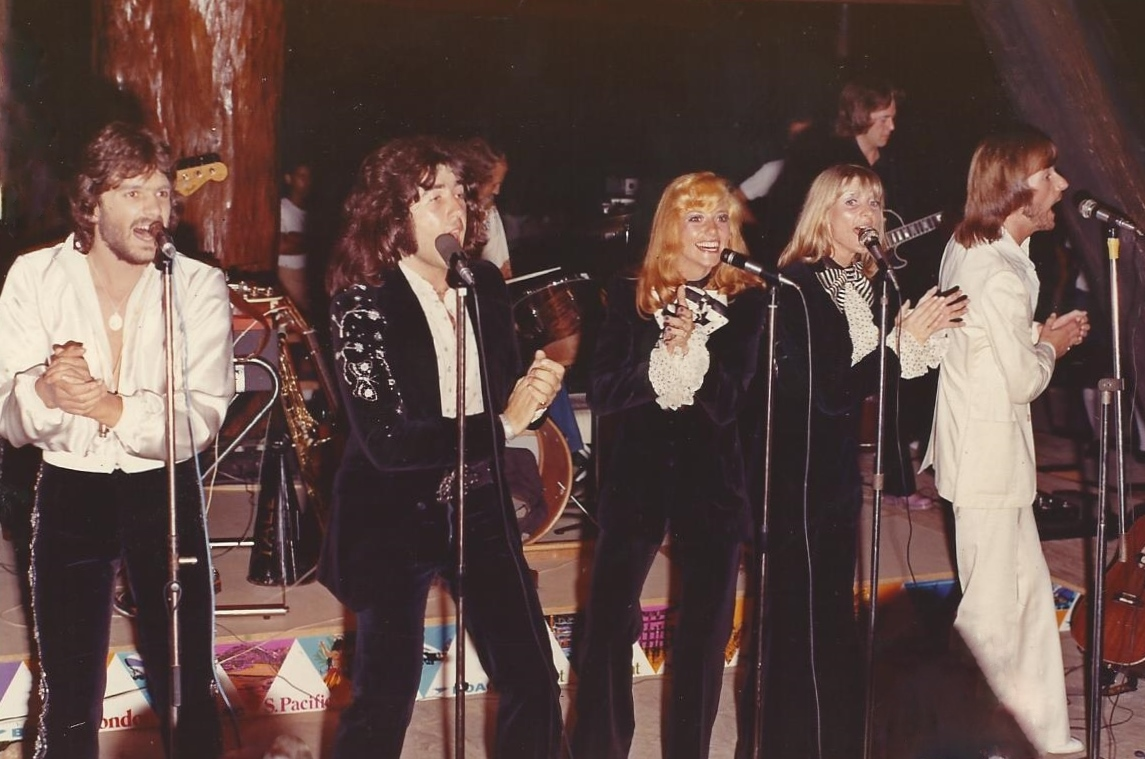
- Design in the Seychelles in 1973

Background information
- Origin: London, England
- Genres: Folk rock, sunshine pop
- Years active: 1968–1976
- Labels: Epic; Capitol; Regal Zonophone; EMI; RPM; Market Square
- Past members: Barry Alexander; Gabrielle Field; Kathy Manuell; Jeff Matthews; John Mulcahy-Morgan; Geoff Ramseyer; Tony Smith

Design was a British vocal group of the early 1970s and its members were Barry Alexander, Gabrielle Field, Kathy Manuell, Jeff Matthews, John Mulcahy-Morgan and Geoff Ramseyer. Their musical style has been described as folk rock 'with intricate and appealing harmonies and an interesting psychedelic twist' and 'sunshine harmony pop with a light hippy vibe' and is now called sunshine pop. Design released 13 singles and 5 albums in the UK and appeared on more than 50 television shows before they split up in 1976.

Barry Alexander, Jeff Matthews and Geoff Ramseyer all played guitar in addition to singing, while Barry also played keyboards. Gabrielle Field occasionally played tenor recorder.

== History ==
Design was formed as a six-piece vocal group by singer and songwriter Tony Smith while he was working at the BBC in London in December 1968. The group signed a recording contract with Adrian Kerridge at Lansdowne Studios and recorded their first album Design during 1969. This led to a two-album deal with Epic Records in the USA.

When Tony Smith left the group in November 1970, he was replaced by guitarist Jeff Matthews. This line-up appeared on The Morecambe and Wise Show in 1971 and subsequently Design became one of the most televised groups in the UK, making guest appearances on dozens of TV shows including The Two Ronnies, Benny Hill, Val Doonican, Rolf Harris, Nana Mouskouri, Cilla Black, Tommy Cooper and many others. They recorded the albums Tomorrow Is So Far Away, Day of the Fox and In Flight before Gabrielle Field and Geoff Ramseyer left the group in October 1974.

The remaining foursome recorded the album By Design before finally disbanding in October 1976.

== Discography ==
=== Albums ===
- January 1971: Design (Epic) (USA)
- March 1971: Design (Epic)
- October 1971: Tomorrow Is So Far Away (Epic)
- February 1973: Day of the Fox (Regal Zonophone)
- May 1974: In Flight (EMI)
- February 1976: By Design (EMI)
- October 2012: One Sunny Day: Singles and Rarities 1968-1978 (RPM)
- April 2019: Children of the Mist: The Best of Design (Market Square)
- March 2021: Design: 50th Anniversary Expanded Edition (Vacancy)

== See also ==
- List of The Morecambe & Wise Show (1968) episodes
- List of Epic Records artists
- List of EMI artists
