= Prather (surname) =

Prather is a surname. Notable people with the surname include:

- Casey Prather (born 1991), American basketball player in the Israeli Basketball Premier League
- Chad Prather, American motivational speaker
- Colt Prather (born 1975), American country music singer-songwriter
- Dale Prather (1910–1973), American football player
- Guy Prather (1958–2016), American National Football League linebacker (1981–1985)
- H. Lee Prather (1886–1964), American head football and basketball coach at Northwestern State University
- Hugh Prather (1938–2010), American self-help writer
- Joan Prather (born 1950), American actress
- Joe Prather (born 1939), American politician
- Kaden Prather (born 2002), American football player
- Lenore L. Prather (1931-2020), American judge
- Maurice Prather (1926–2001), American cinematographer
- Richard S. Prather (1921–2007), American mystery novelist
- Rollin Prather (1925–1996), Canadian Football League player
- Victor Prather (1926–1961), American flight surgeon who died testing the "Project RAM" space suit
