= Kieran Moriarty =

British physician

Dr Kieran John Moriarty, CBE, FRCP, FRCPI is a British physician. He attended St. Ambrose College in Altrincham and studied medicine at Trinity College, Cambridge and the London Hospital.

As consultant gastroenterologist at the Royal Bolton Hospital in Greater Manchester, Moriarty was named Commander of the Order of the British Empire (CBE) by the Queen in the 2002 New Years' Honours List for "services and research into liver disease caused by alcohol abuse". He was invested by the Prince of Wales on 17 April 2002.

== Family/personal life ==
Moriarty has two younger brothers, both of whom are ophthalmologists. His sister is the writer Frances Edmonds.

Moriarty is married to Theresa (née Butler) from Portmagee, County Kerry, a midwife. They have four children.

He is also a musician from a musical family, who has released CDs to raise money for charitable purposes.
