= Jon Briggs =

British narrator

- Born: 24 January 1965 (age 61)
- Education: Dragon School; Magdalen College School, Oxford
- Occupation: Voiceover artist
- Known for: Original UK voice of Siri

Jon (Jonathan) Briggs (born 24 January 1965) is a British television, radio presenter and narrator. He is known for his voice-over work and as the original British voice used by Apple Inc.'s Siri virtual assistant software. He was the voice of BBC quiz show The Weakest Link between 2000 and 2012

== Career ==
Briggs' voiceover credits include appearing as the voiceover statistician in over 1,800 episodes of the BBC TV quiz show The Weakest Link (2000–2012, 2017) and as continuity announcer for BBC Radio 2 (1996–2009) and Channel 4 (1988–1990). Briggs was the first presenter on air when QVC launched in the UK in 1993.

Briggs' radio credits include the breakfast show Oxford AM for BBC Radio Oxford (1985–1987), the breakfast show Morning Edition for BBC Radio 5 (1990–1992), Night Ride for BBC Radio 2 and The Weekend Wireless Show for LBC (1998–2003). His reporting credits include BBC Radio 4's PM, Today, The World at One and The World Tonight, as well as travelogue and transport programmes Breakaway and Going Places.

In 1996, Briggs founded the London-based talent agency Excellent Talent, an entertainment agency representing voice-over actors. He sold it in 2020.

From August 2000 he was the voiceover on the BBC Quiz show "The Weakest Link" voicing over 1800 episodes.

In October 2017, he was a contestant on the celebrity version of the UK quiz show Pointless.

In July 2019, Briggs co-presented BBC Radio 4's "Voice in the Machine" episode of the Archive on 4 series.

In 2015, Briggs started the annual podcast Jon Briggs' Christmas Ghost Stories. In 2026 he launched the monthly subscription companion podcast Jon Briggs' Fireside Ghost Stories

In November 2020, Briggs launched the podcast You're On the Air! talking to UK broadcasters about the skill of broadcasting.

In July 2026 Briggs launched the podcast "Witches, Truth, Trials and Terrors" alongside his stepfather Robin Briggs, discussing the truth behind the European Witch Hunts of the 16th and 17th centuries.

Briggs in 2020

In October 2026 Briggs launched the vodcast "The Back Garden Cricket Club" alongside his fellow broadcaster Bob Harris. Guests included Jonathan Agnew, Sir David Gower, David "Bumble" Lloyd and Andy Zaltzman

In March 2026 Briggs published his manual on Funeral Tributes "Once You've Heard Their Story" after his work as a Funeral Celebrant.

In July 2026 Briggs published his presentation coaching manual called PRESENSATIONS® highlighting his training work through his training company The Showstealers Ltd.

=== Siri ===
In 2007, Briggs recorded his voice for text-to-speech software developed by ScanSoft, later acquired by Nuance Communications. In 2011, Nuance's software was used by Apple Inc. for their first British version of Siri, the personal assistant application for Apple devices. Briggs' voice is renamed "Daniel" for these purposes. The voice is also the default British voice for VoiceOver on iOS devices, the built-in software found within accessibility. This software reads everything aloud on the screen to enable blind and visually impaired people to use their device independently. Since iOS 7, released on 18 September 2013, Briggs' voice for male Siri was replaced and a female voice option was also added.
