= Barry Johnston (writer) =

Writer and producer

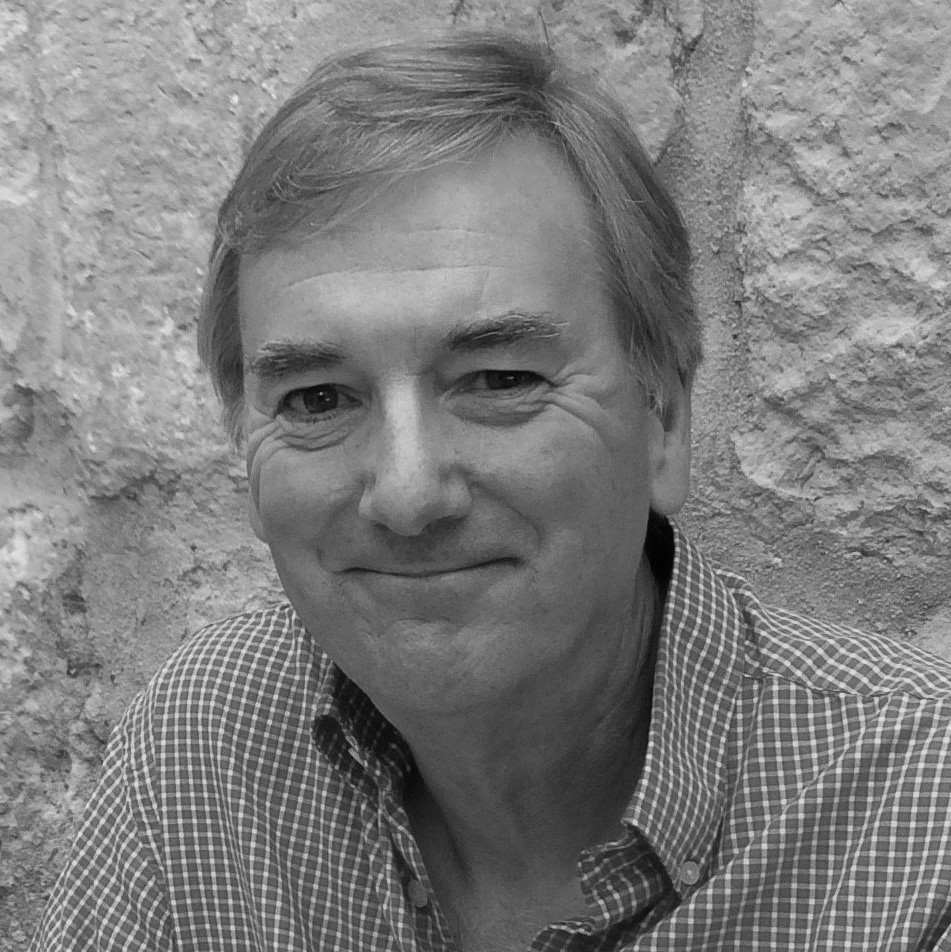
- Barry Johnston in Malta, 2018
- Born: Charles Barry Johnston; 17 April 1949 (age 77); Paddington, London, England
- Other name: Barry Alexander
- Occupations: Writer; Audiobook producer Radio presenter songwriter
- Years active: 1968–present

Charles Barry Johnston (born 17 April 1949), also known as Barry Alexander, is a British writer, audiobook producer, radio presenter and songwriter. He is the eldest son of the BBC cricket commentator Brian Johnston (24 June 1912 – 5 January 1994). He was a member of the British vocal group Design in the 1970s and later presented radio shows on KLOA-AM in California, US and on BBC Radio in the UK. He is now an award-winning producer of audiobooks and has also edited and written several books, including biographies of Kenneth Horne and of his father, Brian Johnston.

== Career ==
=== Music ===
Barry Johnston was educated at Sunningdale School and Eton College. When he was eighteen he signed as a songwriter to The Beatles' company Apple Publishing. In 1969 he joined the vocal group Design who went on to appear on more than fifty television shows in the UK in the early 1970s with stars such as Morecambe & Wise, The Two Ronnies, Tommy Cooper and Benny Hill. When he joined the actors' union Equity in 1970 there was already a member with a similar name so he adopted the stage name Barry Alexander.

Design released 13 singles and 5 albums in the UK and Barry Alexander wrote many of the group's album tracks and b-sides, as well as the singles "Love Is" and "Losing You".

After Design split up at the end of 1976, he became the personal manager of The New Seekers.

=== Radio ===
In 1981 Johnston moved to Los Angeles in California where he enrolled at the Los Angeles Broadcasting School in Hollywood. After graduating, he presented the breakfast show (as Barry Alexander) on Radio KLOA-AM in Ridgecrest, California for two years. After returning to England in 1985 he reverted to using his real name and became a presenter on BBC Radio Sussex in Brighton, where he hosted the daily consumer programme Sussex Standard. In 1990 he joined the new BBC Radio 5 as presenter of the Sunday breakfast show Sunday Edition.

=== Audiobooks ===
In 1992 Johnston formed BarryMour Productions with Chris Seymour and a year later they produced a recording of his father's one-man theatre show An Evening with Johnners. This was released on the EMI Listen For Pleasure label and in 1994 it became the number one bestselling audiobook in the UK for several months, reaching number 46 on the UK Albums Chart and receiving a Gold disc award for sales of more than 100,000 copies.

This was followed by Johnners at the Beeb (BBC Audiobooks) which was also a number one bestseller and was awarded a Silver disc for sales of more than 60,000. It won the 1996 Music Industries Association Award for Spoken Word Recording of the Year.

Since then Johnston has abridged and produced more than one hundred audiobooks, including recordings by Sir Michael Parkinson, Alan Titchmarsh, Tony Benn, Sir Ranulph Fiennes, John Humphrys, Shane Warne, Jack Dee and many others.

In 2003 Johnston and Seymour produced the audio CD The Wit of Cricket (Hodder Headline) featuring Dickie Bird, Henry Blofeld and Brian Johnston, which became the number one bestselling audiobook in the UK in 2007 and 2008 and received a Silver disc award for sales of more than 60,000.

Barry Johnston took over BarryMour Productions in 2006 and he now runs his own company, Barn Productions.

=== Books ===
Johnston has edited and written several books including An Evening with Johnners which was a Sunday Times top ten bestseller in 1996 and Letters Home 1926–1945, also a Sunday Times top ten bestseller in 1998.

As editor:

- 1996: An Evening with Johnners (Partridge Press)
- 1998: Letters Home 1926–1945 (Weidenfeld & Nicolson)
- 2000: A Delicious Slice of Johnners (Virgin)
- 2001: Another Slice of Johnners (Virgin)
- 2002: A Further Slice of Johnners (Virgin)
- 2009: The Wit of Cricket (Hodder & Stoughton)
- 2010: The Wit of Golf (Hodder & Stoughton)
- 2012: An Evening with Johnners: Centenary Edition (Quiller)
- 2019: Have a Cigar! (Quiller)
- 2022: The Wit of Cricket: Second Edition (Hodder & Stoughton)
- 2024: Around the World in 80 Years (Hodder & Stoughton)

And as author:

- 2003: Johnners: The Life of Brian (Hodder & Stoughton)
- 2006: Round Mr Horne: The Life of Kenneth Horne (Aurum Press)

Johnston has also abridged several books for Book at Bedtime on BBC Radio 4 including Solar by Ian McEwan and A Tiny Bit Marvellous by Dawn French.

== See also ==
- Design
- Brian Johnston
- Kenneth Horne
- BBC Radio 5
