= Frances Edmonds =

British writer

Frances Eileen Edmonds
- Education: New Hall, Cambridge
- Occupation: Writer
- Spouse: Phil Edmonds
- Children: 1
- Relatives: Kieran Moriarty (brother)
- Writing career
- Genres: Travel writing, sports writing
- Subjects: Cricket, travel
- Notable works: Another Bloody Tour: England in the West Indies; Cricket XXXX Cricket

Frances Eileen Edmonds is a British writer known for her books Another Bloody Tour: England in the West Indies (1986) and Cricket XXXX Cricket (1987), which detail her experiences touring with her husband, former England cricketer Phil Edmonds.

She appeared as a castaway on the BBC Radio programme Desert Island Discs on 9 August 1987, in conversation with Michael Parkinson.

== Education ==
Edmonds matriculated at New Hall, Cambridge, in 1970 and graduated with a master's degree in Modern and Medieval Languages.

She is a fellow at the Distinguished Careers Institute, Stanford University.

== Personal life ==
Edmonds has two younger brothers, both of whom are ophthalmologists. Her older brother is the physician Kieran Moriarty CBE, FRCP, FRCPI.

Edmonds married the former England cricketer Phil Edmonds towards the end of 1976. They have a daughter.

== Bibliography ==
- —— (1986). Another Bloody Tour: England in the West Indies, 1986. The Kingswood Press. ISBN 978-0434980932. (with the English cricket team in the West Indies in 1985–86)
- —— (1987). Cricket XXXX Cricket. The Kingswood Press. ISBN 978-0434981137.
- —— (1989). Members only. William Heinemann Ltd. ISBN 0434221848.
