= Josh Silverman =

American businessman (born 1969)

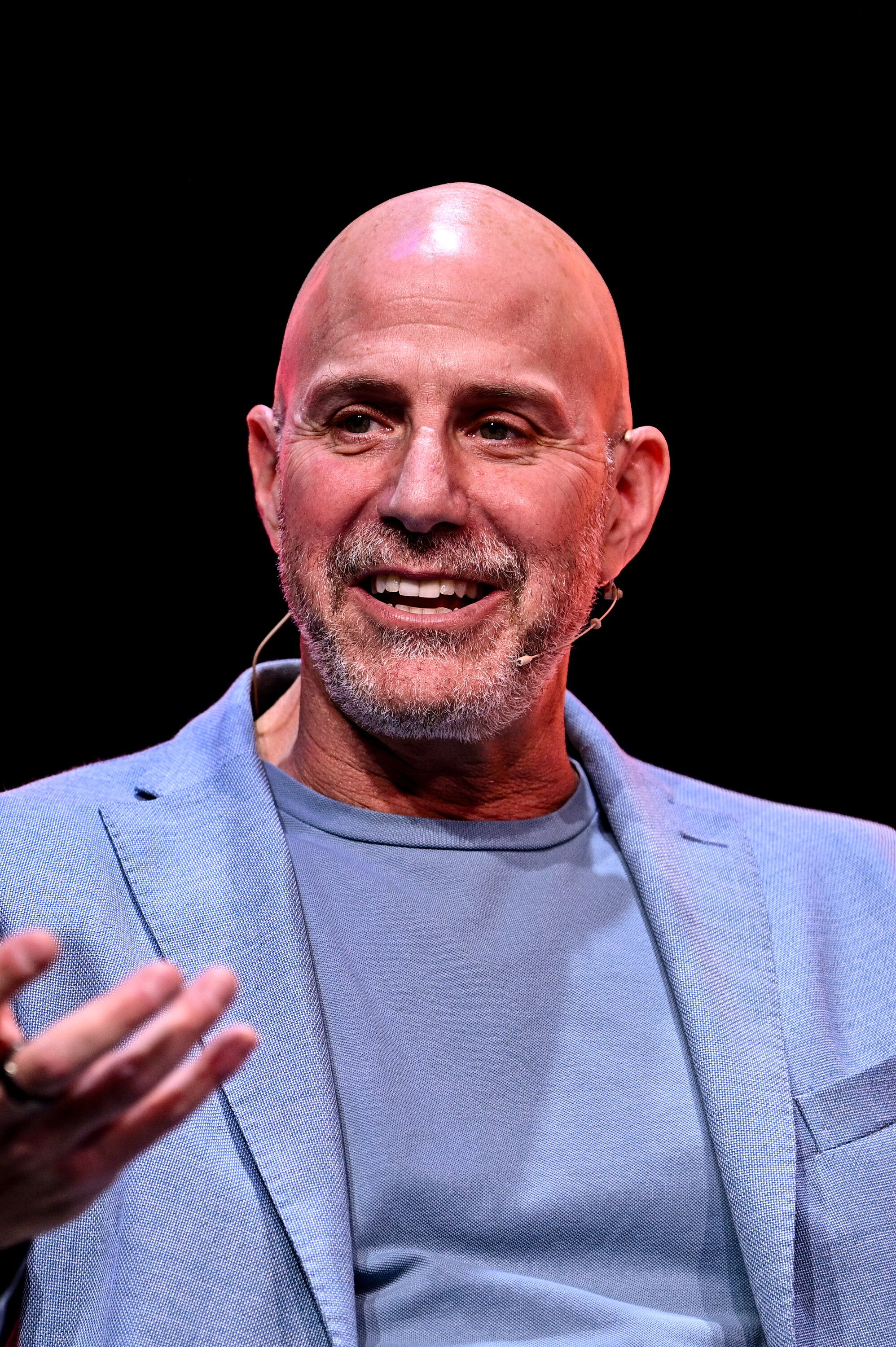
- Silverman in 2024
- Born: January 14, 1969 (age 57)
- Education: Brown University; Stanford University
- Occupation: Entrepreneur

Joshua Gordon Silverman (born January 14, 1969) is an American entrepreneur and technology executive known for his role as chief executive officer of Etsy (2017–2025). He is also known for co-founding the invitation website Evite and being CEO of Skype (2008–10) and shopping.com (2006–08).

== Early life and education ==
Silverman grew up in Ann Arbor, Michigan, where he attended Community High School. He earned a Bachelor of Arts in public policy from Brown University in 1991, after which he spent two years working for New Jersey Senator Bill Bradley. In 1995 he enrolled at the Stanford Graduate School of Business; he earned his MBA from Stanford in 1997.

== Career ==
In November 1998, Silverman quit his job at ADAC Laboratories to work full time on building what would become Evite. Evite was acquired by Barry Diller's IAC/InterActiveCorp in 2001. In 2006, Silverman became CEO of Shopping.com, a comparison-shopping engine owned by eBay. In February 2008, he was named CEO of Skype. He left Skype in 2010 and joined Greylock Partners as an executive-in-residence, before moving on to an executive role as President of Consumer Products and Services at American Express.

Silverman joined the board of Etsy in November, 2016. After an activist investor took a stake in the company and called for it sale, Etsy's board ousted longtime CEO Chad Dickerson and installed Silverman as chief executive officer in May, 2017. He stepped down as CEO in December, 2025 but remains on Etsy's board of directors.

== Personal life ==
Silverman is married and has two children.
