= Nexus (Argentine band) =

- Origin: Argentina
- Genres: Progressive rock
- Years active: Late 1970s–present
- Labels: Record Runner
- Members: Lalo Huber – keyboards, backing vocals Luis Nakamura -drums Carlos Lucena - guitars, backing vocals Roxana Truccolo – bass, vocals

Nexus is a progressive rock band from Argentina. The band was founded in the late 1970s, but released its first album in 1999.

The band is well known around the world. It has performed in different countries (Argentina, Brazil, Mexico, United States, Chile, Panama) and has experienced good sales, reception and reviews of its albums.

== Discography ==
- 1999: Detrás del Umbral (Record Runner, Studio album)
- 2001: Metanoia (Record Runner, Studio album)
- 2002: Live at NEARFest 2000 (Record Runner, Live)
- 2006: Perpetuum Karma (Record Runner, Studio album)
- 2007: Bs As Free Experience 2 (Record Runner, Studio jamming album)
- 2012: Magna Fabulis
- 2012: Aire (Record Runner, Studio album)
- 2017: En el Comienzo del Topos Uranos (Record Runner, Studio album, cd and vinyl version)
- 2023: Isania (Record Runner, Studio album)

== Musicians ==
- 1999: Detrás del Umbral
- 2001: Metanoia
- 2002: Live at NEARFest 2000

Mariela González: lead vocals.
Carlos Lucena: guitars.
Daniel Ianniruberto: bass.
Luis Nakamura: drums.
Lalo Huber: keyboards.

- 2006: Perpetuum Karma

Lito Marcello: lead vocals.
Carlos Lucena: guitars.
Daniel Ianniruberto: bass.
Luis Nakamura: drums, percussion.
Lalo Huber: keyboards.

- 2007: Bs As Free Experience 2

Carlos Lucena: guitars.
Daniel Ianniruberto: bass.
Luis Nakamura: drums, percussion.
Lalo Huber: keyboards.
guest:
Lito Marcello: lead vocal.
Ricardo Soulé: violin.

- 2012: Magna Fabulis

Carlos Lucena: guitars; bass.
Luis Nakamura: drums.
Lalo Huber: keyboards.
guest:
Daniel Ianniruberto: bass.
Lito Marcello: lead vocal.

- 2012: Aire

Carlos Lucena: guitars, backing vocals.
Machy Madero: bass.
Luis Nakamura: drums.
Lalo Huber: keyboards and lead vocals.
guest:
Roxana Trúccolo: lead vocals.

- 2017: En el Comienzo del Topos Uranos

Carlos Lucena: guitars.
Jorge Mariño Martínez: bass.
Luis Nakamura: drums.
Lalo Huber: keyboards.
invitada:
Roxana Trúccolo: lead vocals.

- 2023: Insania

Carlos Lucena: guitars.
Roxy Truccolo: bass. vocals.
Luis Nakamura: drums.
Lalo Huber: keyboards.
