= Bond Dealers of America =

American trade association for fixed income participants

Bond Dealer of America
- Abbreviation: BDA
- Established: March 2008; 18 years ago
- Type: Trade association
- Purpose: Lobby for the U.S. fixed income market participants
- Location: Washington, DC, United States
- Region served: United States
- Members: 100+ (2024)
- Official language: English
- CEO: Mike Nicholas
- Website: www.bdamerica.org
- Formerly called: Regional Bond Dealers Association

The Bond Dealers of America (BDA), formerly Regional Bond Dealers Association, is an American trade association focused on representing regional and middle-market securities firms active in the United States fixed income markets. The BDA is headquartered in Washington, DC, USA.

== History ==
Old Logo and original name

The RBDA was formed in March 2008 by 14 firms. The RBDA's stated mission was to "work to advocate public policies and market practices aimed at improving the market environment" and to "provide a forum for its members to discuss and debate issues of common interest."

In September 2011 the association changed its name to the Bond Dealers of America to better reflected its mission and expanding membership.

== Leadership ==
The RBDA is led by a 15-member board of directors. Executive staff of the RBDA includes Chief Executive Officer Mike Nicholas.
