= Daire Brehan =

Irish actress, broadcaster and barrister

Daire Brehan (7 August 1957, in Dublin – 30 August 2012, in London) was an Irish actress, broadcaster and barrister who presented a variety of BBC Radio programmes during the 1990s including Language Live, for BBC Radio 5, You and Yours, The Afternoon Shift (1995–98) and Pick of the Week for BBC Radio 4, a documentary Too Many Songs on American comic songster Tom Lehrer for BBC Radio 2, Pick of the World for BBC World Service, and Today’s Agenda for BBC Radio Kent.

Prior to her broadcasting career, she worked as an actress on stage and TV in Ireland. Following a scholarship to the Contemporary Theatre of Wroclaw in Poland, she returned to Ireland in 1985 and co-founded, with director Maciek Bernatt-Reszczynski, the theatre company Theatre Unlimited, acting in many productions which included work inspired by modern Eastern European theatre and the Irish cultural tradition.

Her broadcasting work began with RTÉ Radio 1, for whom she presented programmes including Sounding Out and Brehan’s Law, the latter drawing on her earlier legal training. As an undergraduate in the 1970s at Trinity College Dublin her law tutors included Mary McAleese who went on to become president of Ireland, and former Irish President and UN Commissioner, Mary Robinson. Moving on from BBC Radio 4 in the late 1990s, she returned to the law to convert her Irish law degree to meet UK requirements and was called to the Bar in July 2002 under her birth name Daire Brennan-Holahan, subsequently practising in criminal defence and prosecution. As a prosecutor she appeared on behalf of the National Probation Service and Local Authorities in prosecutions in the Crown Court, and as a defence barrister she represented clients on a wide array of charges. In 2005 she was called to the Bar of the Republic of Ireland. She was a member of the Inner Temple and also the founder and Hon Secretary of the Inner Temple Residents' Association, and in 2012 was elected a Bencher of the Honourable Society of the Inner Temple.

From April 2007, while continuing to work as a consultant trainer to the legal profession, she also worked as a qualified Pilates Instructor and holistic massage therapist.
