= Colt Prather =

American country music singer-songwriter (born 1975)

- Born: December 10, 1975 (age 49)
- Origin: El Paso, Texas
- Genres: Country
- Occupation: Singer-songwriter
- Labels: Epic

Colt Prather (born December 10, 1971, in El Paso, Texas) is an American country music singer-songwriter. Prather was discovered playing with the house band at a Nashville restaurant and signed to Epic Records. His third single for the label, "I Won't Go On and On," peaked at number 48 on the Billboard Hot Country Singles & Tracks chart in early 2004. The song received a favorable review from Deborah Evans Price of Billboard, who said that "Prather is the owner of a voice that should easily separate him from the rest of the pack" and "success in the country format is surely forthcoming." By June 2004, Prather had exited the label.

== Discography ==
=== Singles ===
Year	Single	Peak positions
Year	Single	US Country
2003	"The Dash"	—
2003	"Not a Brick Out of Place"	—
2004	"I Won't Go On and On"	48
