= Small Business Commissioner =

UK public body supporting small businesses

The Office of the Small Business Commissioner (OSBC) is an independent public body established by Government under the Enterprise Act 2016 to tackle late payments and unfair payment practices. It supports small businesses to get paid quickly and on time, influences large businesses to improve payment times to suppliers and works with all business to improve the culture of payment practices across the whole of the UK – England, Wales, Scotland and Northern Ireland.

The Small Business Commissioner has a statutory duty to review complaints by small businesses regarding late payments, as well as provide advice and support on issues relating to late payment and payment practices in the private sector. Additionally, the OSBC undertake a range activity to improve outcomes for small businesses and work across Government, and with partners in the private and third sector, to raise awareness of the impact of late payments and unfair payment practices.

The OSBC also administers the Fair Payment Code (FPC) on behalf of the Department for Business and Trade (DBT). The FPC is designed to tackle late and unfair payment practices among businesses, replacing the previous Prompt Payment Code. It encourages businesses to adopt clear, fair, and collaborative payment practices, offering different award tiers (Gold, Silver, and Bronze) based on their payment performance.

== Background ==
The Small Business Commissioner was established as a non-departmental public body by the Department for Business, Energy and Industrial Strategy (BEIS). It was announced in a discussion paper issued in July 2015 and was formally proposed for creation within the Enterprise Bill introduced into the UK Parliament in September 2015.

Anna Soubry MP, the Minister of State for Small Business, Industry and Enterprise within the Department for Business, Energy and Industrial Strategy, anticipated that the Small Business Commissioner would 'build the confidence and capabilities of small businesses to help them assert themselves in contractual disputes and negotiate more effectively'.

Under the legislation, the Commissioner:

- enables small businesses to resolve disputes and avoid future issues through general advice and information
- signposts businesses to appropriate services e.g. sector ombudsmen or regulators, existing independent advice services, approved alternative dispute resolution (ADR) providers or the Commissioner's own complaints handling function
- considers complaints by small business suppliers about payment issues with larger businesses that they supply

A proposal to give the Commissioner a role in direct mediation between businesses was not pursued as the government did not believe there was sufficient evidence of market failure in relation to mediation services.

Following a Machinery of Government (MoG) change in 2023, the Department for Business and Trade replaced the Department for Business, Energy and Industrial Strategy as the parent organisation of the OSBC.

== Commissioner ==
On 23 June 2025 Emma Jones CBE, founder of Enterprise Nation replaced Liz Barclay [11] as the Small Business Commissioner.

Since taking up the role, Emma Jones has said her mission and vision is focused on making life easier for small businesses by getting money moving through the economy and streamlining support. She has committed to working in partnership with industry and the public sector, spotlighting and championing good payment practices leading to a positive payment culture. Jones’ vision is to see reductions in amounts owing to small businesses and in their non-productive hours spent chasing late payments.

Since coming into post Emma Jones, the current Small Business Commissioner, has confirmed a focus on

1. Technology adoption: making life easier by leveraging technology to speed up payments and direct small businesses to relevant finance and support.
2. Public and private partnership: results will be delivered in partnership with government at all levels, and with industry, to free up time so founders can focus on what they do best and go for growth.
3. Cultural change: we will celebrate good business through the Fair Payment Code and continue to challenge companies that pay late and engage in unfair practices.

On 25 July 2025 a consultation was launched looking at potential new measures that would see more powers given to the Small Business Commissioner to penalise companies that are repeat offenders at paying late and to launch anonymous investigations into cases of late payment.
