= Liz Barclay =

UK broadcaster and Small Business Commissioner

- Born: Northern Ireland
- Occupations: Radio presenter, newsreader and journalist
- Website: Personal; Business

Liz Barclay (born c. 1954) is a British-based Northern Irish broadcaster, journalist and writer.

== Career ==
Barclay was born and brought up in Northern Ireland. Her early career was as a financial advisor and manager at the Citizens' Advice Bureau where she worked from 1985 to 1991. Her first job in radio was at the BBC where she was taken on as a researcher and producer in the Continuing Education department. She has been a presenter of You and Yours, the consumer affairs programme. She is a freelance presenter specialising in personal finance and small business.

She is the author of books on Sir Philip Green and Duncan Bannatyne. She writes a consumer affairs column for the Independent on Sunday. She is also a lay member of the NHS Equality and Diversity Council.

She was the UK's Small Business Commissioner from July 2021 to June 2025.
