= List of Sargodha cricketers =

This is a list of cricketers who have played matches for the Sargodha cricket team in Pakistan.

- Shaukat Abbas
- Faisal Afridi
- Sajjad Akbar
- Saleem Akhtar
- Rizwan Aslam
- Dildar Awan
- Aziz-ur-Rehman
- Syed Iftikhar Bokhari
- Iqbal Chaudhri
- Humayun Farkhan
- Mohammad Hafeez
- Ahmed Hayat
- Zahid Hussain
- Mujahid Jamshed
- Naeem Khan
- Samiullah Khan
- Sherandaz Khan
- Zaheer Khan
- Naved Latif
- Saleem Malik
- Abdul Mannan
- Afzal Masood
- Misbah-ul-Haq
- Mohammad Nawaz
- Arshad Pervez
- Wasim Raja
- Ahsan Raza
- Akram Raza
- Farrukh Raza
- Anis-ur-Rehman
- Ali Sawal
- Aamer Sohail
- Azhar Sultan
