= List of Allied Bank Limited cricketers =

List of cricketers

This is a list of all cricketers who have played first-class or List A matches for Allied Bank Limited cricket team. The team played 116 first-class matches between 1979 and 2005 and 85 List A matches between 1983 and 2005. Seasons given are first and last seasons; the player did not necessarily play in all the intervening seasons.

== Notable players ==
- Aaley Haider, 1990/91-2004/05
- Aamer Hanif, 1994/95-2004/05
- Aamer Nazir, 1993/94-2002/03
- Aamer Sohail, 1992/93-2000/01
- Aaqib Javed, 1992/93-2002/03
- Abdur Rauf, 2003/04-2004/05
- Abid Butt, 1995/96-1997/98
- Aleem Dar, 1995/96
- Amin Lakhani, 1982/83-1984/85
- Arshad Khan, 1995/96-2004/05
- Ata-ur-Rehman, 1991/92-2001/02
- Ata-ur-Rehman, 1992/93-2004/05
- Athar Khan, 1978/79-1992/93
- Azeem Hafeez, 1982/83-1983/84
- Bilal Asad, 2002/03-2004/05
- Bilal Rana, 1992/93-1999/00
- Ehsan Butt, 1995/96-1999/00
- Farhan Adil, 2003/04
- Farooq Rasheed, 1978/79-1984/85
- Feroz Najamuddin, 1983/84-1984/85
- Humayun Farhat, 1997/98-2002/03
- Humayun Hussain, 1990/91-1999/00
- Ijaz Ahmed, 1994/95-2004/05
- Iqbal Saleem, 1995/96-2000/01
- Iqtidar Ali, 1978/79-1984/85
- Jahangir Khan sen, 1996/97
- Jalal-ud-Din, 1982/83-1984/85
- Kamran Khan, 1995/96-1997/98
- Kashif Mahmood, 2000/01
- Khalid Latif, 2003/04-2004/05
- Manzoor Akhtar, 1990/91-2004/05
- Masroor Hussain, 1995/96-1999/00
- Mazhar Alvi, 1978/79-1981
- Mohammad Akram, 1996/97-2000/01
- Mohammad Nawaz, 1993/94-2001/02
- Mohammad Salman, 2003/04-2004/05
- Mohammad Zahid, 1994/95-2004/05
- Mohsin Kamal, 1983/84
- Moinuddin, 1979/80-1991/92
- Nadeem Qureshi, 1978/79-1981
- Naseer Chughtai, 1982/83
- Naved Latif, 2001/02-2002/03
- Naved-ul-Hasan, 2001/02
- Raees-ur-Rehman, 1981-1984/85
- Raj Hans, 1991/92-1999/00
- Rameez Raja, 1983/84-1997/98
- Rasakh Akhtar, 1978/79
- Rashid Latif, 1996/97-2004/05
- Rifaqat Ali, 1992/93-1996/97
- Rizwan Aslam, 2003/04-2004/05
- Saleem Yousuf, 1982/83-1984/85
- Salman Qizilbash, 1978/79-1983/84
- Shahid Mahboob, 1982/83-1998/99
- Shahid Naqi, 1990/91-1995/96
- Shoaib Habib, 1978/79-1990/91
- Tahir Mughal, 2003/04-2004/05
- Tahir Nisar, 1978/79-1982/83
- Taimur Khan, 1997/98-2004/05
- Talat Masood, 1982/83-1984/85
- Tanvir Ahmed, 2000/01-2004/05
- Tauqir Haider, 1978/79-1979/80
- Usman Tariq, 2000/01-2004/05
- Wajahatullah Wasti, 1995/96-2004/05
- Waqar Younis, 2003/04
- Wasif Ali, 1999/00
- Zafar Ahmed, 1983/84-1984/85
- Zafar Mehdi, 1981-1991/92
- Zaki Ahmed, 1978/79-1979/80
