= List of people from Multan =

This is a list of notable people from Multan city and Multan District.

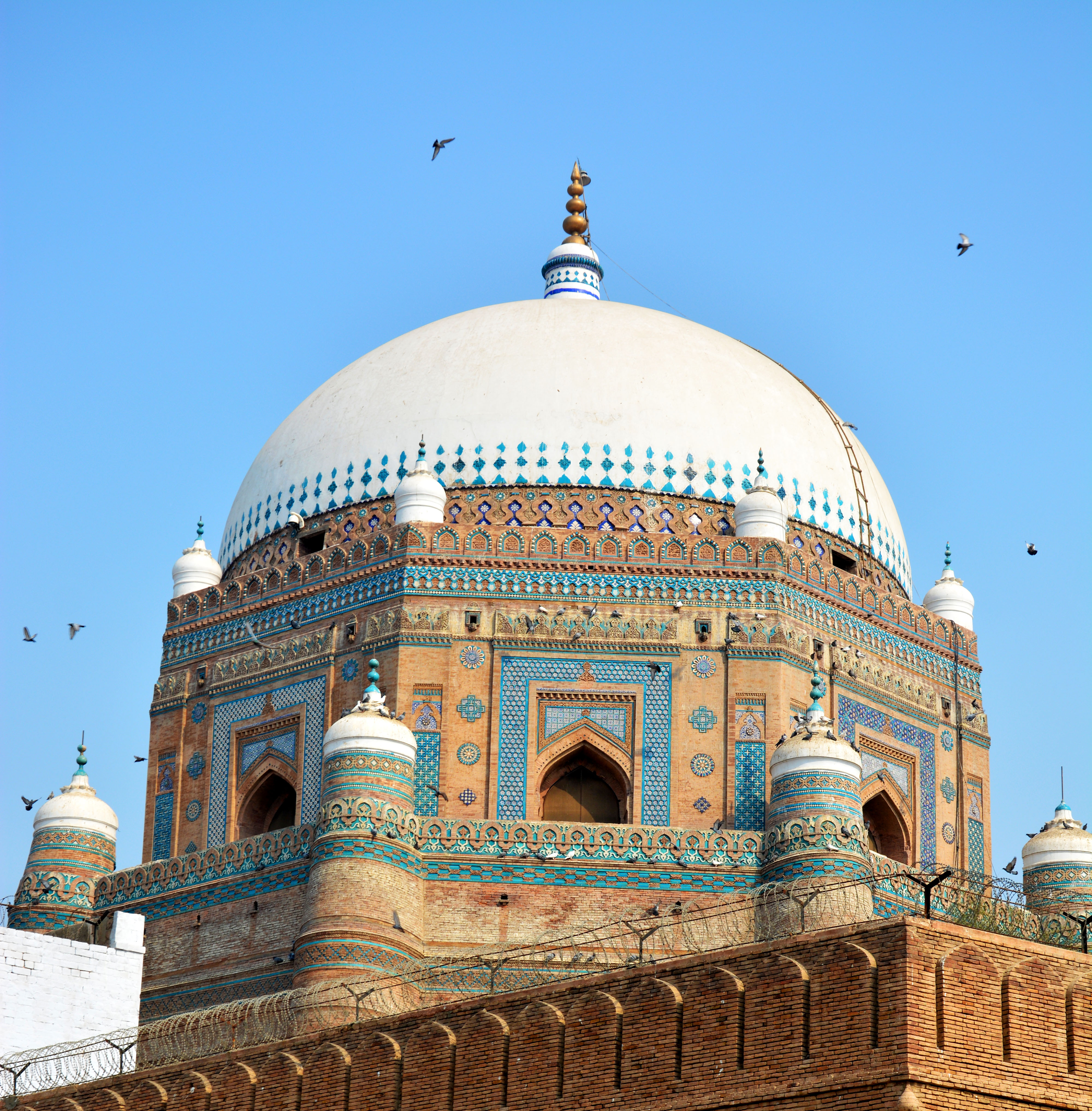
Multan's Tomb of Shah Rukn-e-Alam

== Scholars ==
- Syed Ata Ullah Shah Bukhari, Muslim scholar
- Anwaar Ahmad, writer and academician

== Sports ==
- Aamer Bashir, cricketer
- Ali Sawal, cricketer and sports commentator
- Arif Mehmood, football player
- Asmavia Iqbal, cricketer
- Aamer Yamin, cricketer
- Farhan Khan, Omani cricketer
- Inzamam-ul-Haq, cricketer
- Naveed Akram, football player
- Rahat Ali, cricketer
- Sania Khan, cricketer
- Saqib Ali, cricketer
- Sohaib Maqsood, cricketer
- Sukhan Faiz, cricketer
- Khurram Khan, UAE cricketer
- Robin Kreyer (1910-1987), cricketer and British Army/British Indian Army officer
- Imam-ul-Haq, cricketer

== Rulers ==
- Ahmad Shah Durrani, founder of Durrani Empire
- Bahlul Lodi, founder of Lodhi dynasty
- Fateh Daud, ruler of Multan
- Khizr Khan, founder of Sayyid dynasty of Delhi sultanate
- Nawab Ali Mohammad Khan Khakwani, Governor of Multan, Durrani Empire
- Nawab Zahid Khan (From 1738 to 1748)
- Nawab Shuja Khan - Governor of Multan and founder of Shujabad
- Nawab Muzaffar Khan Governor of Multan and founder of Muzaffargarh

== Politicians ==
- Yousaf Raza Gillani, former Prime Minister of Pakistan
- Shah Mehmood Qureshi, former Foreign Minister of Pakistan
- Javed Hashmi, former Federal Minister
- Malik Muhammad Rafique Rajwana, Senator & former Governor of Punjab
- Hamid Raza Gillani, former Federal Minister & Ambassador
- Hamid Saeed Kazmi, former Federal Minister
- Sahibzada Farooq Ali, former Speaker of the National Assembly

== Holy figures ==
- Dewan Mulraj, Sikh saint
- Fariduddin Ganjshakar, Saint
- Mai Maharban, female saint
- Syed Musa Pak, Muslim Sufi
- Rukn-e-Alam, Muslim Sufi

== Scientists ==
- H. Gobind Khorana, Nobel prize winner scientist

== Others ==
- Mazhar Kaleem, writer and novelist
- Muhammad Sharif, cosmologist
- Mahindar Pall Singh, Sikh MPA, politician and Business man
- Ravi Batra, Indian-American economist and professor
- Syed Noor Ul Hassan Bukhari (Scholar writer )
- Sadiq Ali Shahzad, sculptor
- Saima Noor, film actress
- Najam Sheraz, singer
- Hamza Ali Abbasi, film actor
- Hajra Yamin, actress
- Wes Huff, Christian Apologist
