= International Cricket (board game) =

Board game about cricket

Cover of 1st edition, 1985

International Cricket is a board game published in 1985 by the British company Lambourne Games.

== Contents ==
International Cricket is a two-player game in which a game of one-day cricket is simulated.

=== Components ===
The game includes 120 cards representing top international players of the mid-1980s, five dice (two red for the bowler, two blue for the batter, and one white for Pitch, Weather and Fielding modifiers), and a series of tables to determine the results of the dice rolls. Players use a card to track the number of balls bowled in each over, as well as the number of overs.

=== Set up ===
Each player selects a team from the player deck. The weather for the match, which may have an effect on play, is determined randomly. The first player to bat is also determined randomly.

=== Gameplay ===
The bowler rolls the red dice, and the result is referenced against the bowler's card. The batter then rolls the blue dice and the result is referenced on the batter's card. The result of the bowler is then cross-referenced against the batter's result, giving a final result of the play. This can range from 0–6 runs scored to the possibility of an out, which may be determined by a random roll on the "Out Chart", the "Ball in the Air" chart or the "Edged - Chance Chart".

For example, the bowling player has selected Imran Khan as the bowler, and rolls a 5, which results in a "Good Length" result on Khan's card. The batting player has selected batter Geoffrey Boycott, and rolls a 9. On Boycott's card, this results in an "F". Consulting the "Good Length" chart, "F" indicates a "Back Defensive" stroke. In this instance Boycott is not out but no runs are scored.

== Publication history ==
In 1985, Terry Goodchild designed a one-day cricket game that used dice and a series of charts, One-Day International. Goodchild immediately followed this up with an extension, Test Match Replay. The two were then combined and published by British company Lamboure Games in 1985 as International Cricket.

In 1987, Lambourne released a simplified version of the game titled County Cricket that did not use player cards, but graded each county for playing ability, using zonal weather, five batting modes and pitch conditions.

In 1992, International Cricket was republished by Laser Beam Games.

== Reception ==
In Issue 8 of Games International, Brian Walker liked this game, but noted, "This really is a game for cricket fans rather than gamers per se. If you fall into both categories then its acquisition is a must." Walker concluded by giving the game a good rating of 4 out of 5.

In his 1990 book The Wisden Book of Cricket Memorabilia, Marcus Williams noted that this game, compared to previous cricket simulations, "has added complexities and variables, such as pitch and weather alterations ... allowing batting modes and tactical play. It also features a special set of rules called Bodyline."

In his 2010 book The Spirit of Cricket : What Makes Cricket the Greatest Game on Earth, Rob Smythe recalled this game being especially good for young fans of the game, writing, "[I have] a personal memory of staying up until the small hours in the early nineties, despite having school the next day, to play just one more over of the dice game International Cricket by Lambourne Games, and then excitably regaling stories of my Test Championship to bemused classmates the following day. Ramiz Raja's 212-ball 52 never sounded so exciting. They may have had active social lives and the ability to make eye contact with the opposite sex, but I knew who was winning."
