= Shaukat Abbas =

Pakistani cricketer (1946-2018)

- Abbas in Faisalabad in March 2015

Personal information
- Born: 17 January 1946; Jullundar (now Jalandhar), Punjab, India
- Died: 13 January 2018 (aged 71); Faisalabad, Pakistan
- Source: Cricinfo, 26 April 2021

Shaukat Abbas (17 January 1946 – 13 January 2018) was a Pakistani cricketer. He played in three first-class matches for Sargodha from 1968/69 to 1975/76. As well as being a player, he was also a cricket administrator, umpire and coach in Faisalabad.

== See also ==
- List of Sargodha cricketers
