= Andrew Leonard =

Andrew Leonard may refer to:

- Andrew Leonard (journalist) (born 1962), American journalist
- Andrew Leonard (commentator), Irish cricket commentator and presenter
- Andy Leonard (1846–1903), American baseball player
