= Abeynaike =

- Language: Sinhala

Origin
- Region of origin: Sri Lanka

Abeynaike is a Sinhalese surname.

== Notable people ==
- Cyril Abeynaike (1911–1991), Anglican Bishop of Colombo
- Ranil Abeynaike (1955–2012), Sri Lankan cricketer
