= List of cricket commentators =

This is a list of notable media commentators and writers on the sport of cricket from around the world.

A number of famous players have had a second career as writers or commentators. However, many commentators never played the game at a professional level, yet they have gone on to become famous names associated with the game. The following is a list of the cricket commentators, including name, nationality, Broadcaster/Publication and other careers.

== List of commentators ==
Name	First–class / List A career	Broadcaster/Publication
(England) David Acfield	Essex 1966–1986	(England) BBC Television 1986-1990
(Sri Lanka) Russel Arnold	Sri Lanka 1997–2007; Nondescripts Cricket Club 1993–2007; Chennai Superstars	(United Arab Emirates) TEN Sports 2009–present (India) Star Sports Tamil 2019–present
(Sri Lanka) Ranil Abeynaike	Bedfordshire 1982; Sinhalese Sports Club 1989–1990	(United Arab Emirates) TEN Sports 2004–2011 (India) Nimbus Sport 2006–2011
(Sri Lanka) Karunaratne Abeysekera	None	Radio Ceylon/ Sri Lanka Broadcasting Corporation
(Sri Lanka) Bandula Saman Wathuregama	None	Radio Ceylon/ Sri Lanka Broadcasting Corporation/ Sri Lanka Cricket Youtube Channel
(Sri Lanka) Roshan Abeysinghe	Ragama Cricket Club	(United Arab Emirates) TEN Sports 2010–present
(South Africa) H. D. Ackerman	South Africa 1998	(South Africa) SuperSport (Super Cricket)
(England) Jonathan Agnew	Leicestershire 1978–1990, 1992; England 1984–1985	(England) BBC Radio (Test Match Special) 1991–present (England) The People 1990–1991 (England) BBC Television 1999, 2007–2009 (Australia) ABC ?–present
(Pakistan) Wasim Akram	Pakistan 1985–2003	(India) ESPN Star Sports 2003–2015 (England) Channel 4 1999–2002
(Australia) Terry Alderman	Western Australia 1974–1963; Australia 1981–1991; Kent 1984–1986; Gloucestershire 1988	(Australia) ABC (Grandstand) 1993–present
(England) Paul Allott	Lancashire 1978–1991; England 1981–1985	(England) BBC Television 1994–1995 (England) Sky Sports 1995–present
(England) Rex Alston (1901–1994)	None	(England) BBC Radio 1945–1957 (England) BBC Radio (Test Match Special) 1957–1964,
(India) Lala Amarnath (1933–1955)	India 1936–1952	All India Radio
(England) James Anderson	Lancashire County Cricket Club; England cricket team 2002–2024	(England) BBC Radio (Test Match Special) 2017–present (England) BBC Television 2021–present
(England) John Arlott (1914–1991)	None	(England) BBC Radio 1946–1957 (England) BBC Radio (Test Match Special) 1957–1980 (England) BBC Television 1965-1980 (England) The Guardian 1968–1980
(Bangladesh) Athar Ali Khan	Bangladesh 1988–1998	(Bangladesh) Independent Television 2013–present (India) Nimbus Sport
(England) Mike Atherton	Lancashire 1987–2001; England 1989–2001	(England) Channel 4 2002–2005 (England) Sunday Telegraph (England) The Times (England) Talksport 2004–2005 (England) Sky Sports 2005–present (Australia) Channel 7 2021–22 Ashes Series
(England) Trevor Bailey (1923–2011)	Essex 1946–1967; England 1949–1959	(England) BBC Radio (Test Match Special) 1967–1999
(England) Jack Bannister (1930–2016)	Warwickshire 1950–1968	(England) BBC Television 1984–1998 (England) Talksport 2001–2015
(Australia) Richie Benaud (1930–2015)	New South Wales 1948–1964; Australia 1952–1964	(England) BBC Television 1960–1999, 2007 (Australia) Channel 9 1977–2013 (England) Channel 4 1999–2005 (England) Channel 5 2009
(India) Harsha Bhogle	None	(Australia) ABC 1991–present (India) ESPN Star Sports 1995– (England) BBC Radio 1996-2008 (Australia) Fox Cricket 2018–
(Cricket West Indies) Ian Bishop	West Indies 1989–1998	(England) Sky Sports 2005–present (England) Channel 4 2000–2004 (South Africa) SABC Television 2005–2008 (England) Channel 5 2007–2009
(Australia) Greg Blewett	South Australia 1991–2007; Australia 1995–2000	(England) Sky Sports 2009– (Australia) Seven Network 2018–
(England) Henry Blofeld	Cambridge University 1958–1960	(England) ITV 1966–1969 (England) BBC (Test Match Special) 1972–1991, 1994–2017 (England) Sky Sports 1991–1992
(England) Sir Ian Botham	Somerset 1974–1985; Worcestershire 1986–1991; Durham 1992–1993; England 1976–1992	(England) Sky Sports 1995–2019
(England) Sir Geoffrey Boycott	Yorkshire 1962–1986; England 1964–1982	(England) Sky Sports 1990–1998 (England) BBC Television 1990–1998 (England) Talksport 1998–2003 (England) Channel 4 2004–2005 (England) BBC (Test Match Special) 2005–2020 (England) Channel 5 2006–2020
(Cricket West Indies) Carlos Brathwaite	Barbados 2010–present West Indies 2011–2019	(England) BBC Television 2020–present (England) BBC (Test Match Special) 2020–?
(Australia) James Brayshaw	Western Australia 1987–1990; South Australia 1990–1997	(Australia) Nine Network 2007–2016 (Australia) Seven Network 2018–,
(England) Stuart Broad	Leicestershire 2005–2007; Nottinghamshire 2008–2023; England 2006–2023	(England) Sky Sports 2018–present
(England) Freddie Brown (1910–1991)	England 1931–1953	(England) BBC (Test Match Special) 1957–69
(England) Mark Butcher	Surrey 1992–2009; England 1997–2004	(England) Talksport 2018–2019 (England) ITV Sport 2010–2014 (England) Sky Sports 2018–present
(Australia) Jim Burke	Australia 1951–1959	
(New Zealand) Chris Cairns	New Zealand 1989–2004	Fox Sports Australia 2012–present
(Australia) Greg Chappell (Note: The Chappell brothers (Greg and Ian) are grandsons of Vic Richardson.)	South Australia 1966–1973; Queensland 1973–1984; Somerset 1968–1969; Australia 1970–1984	(Australia) Channel 9 1989–1994
(Australia) Ian Chappell	South Australia 1961–1980; Lancashire 1963; Australia 1964–1980	(Australia) Channel 9 1980–2018 (India) ESPN Star sports 2007–present (England) Channel 5 2009 (England) BBC Television 1977, 1993, 1997-1999,
(Australia) Michael Charlton	None	(Australia) ABC 1954–? (England) BBC Radio 1956 (Ashes series) (India) Nimbus Sport
(Australia) Michael Clarke	Australia 2003-2015	(Australia) Nine Network 2014-2018
(England) Brian Close (1931-2015)	England 1949-1976	(England) BBC Television 1978-1982
(England) Charles Colville	None	(England) Sky Sports 1990–present
(England) Denis Compton (1918–1997)	England 1937–1957; Middlesex 1936–58	(England) BBC Television 1958–75 (England) Sunday Express
(New Zealand) Jeremy Coney	Wellington 1971–1987; New Zealand 1974–1987	(New Zealand) Sports Roundup/Radio Sport 1990–2000 (New Zealand) Sky Sport 2004
(England) Sir Alastair Cook	Bedfordshire 2002; Essex 2003–present England 2006–2018	(England) BBC (Test Match Special) 2019–present (England) BBC Television 2020–present
(England) Dominic Cork	Derbyshire 1990–2003; Lancashire 2004–2008; Hampshire 2009–2011; England 1992–2002	(England) BBC (Test Match Special) 2007-2010; Pakistan Television Corporation 2009–present (England) Talksport 2013–present (England) Sky Sports 2011–present
(Australia) Jamie Cox	Tasmania 1987–2005	
(Cricket West Indies) Tony Cozier (1940–2016)	None	Barbados Daily News 1961–1969 (Australia) Nine Network 1977–1992 (Australia) ABC ?–? (England) Sky Sports (England) BBC (Test Match Special) 1966–2015
(England) Peter Cranmer (1914–1994)	Warwickshire 1934–1954	(England) BBC (Test Match Special) 1965–1968 BBC Radio 1958-1974
(England) Aidan Crawley (1908-1993)	Kent 1927-1947	(England) BBC Television 1939-1947
(Cricket West Indies) Colin Croft	West Indies 1977-1982	(England) BBC Television 1995, 1999
(New Zealand) Martin Crowe (1962–2016)	New Zealand 1982–1995	(New Zealand) Sky Sport 2006
(New Zealand) Craig Cumming	Canterbury 1995–2000; Otago 2000–2015; New Zealand 2005–2009	(New Zealand) Sky Sport 2014,
(England) Charles Dagnall	Warwickshire 1999-2001; Leicestershire 2002-2004	(England) BBC Radio 2012-2021
(Sri Lanka) Aravinda De Silva	Sri Lanka 1984–2003	(England) Sky Sports 2006
(England) Ted Dexter (1935-2021)	Sussex 1956–1968; England 1958–1968	(England) BBC Television 1968-1988
(South Africa) Allan Donald	South Africa 1991–2003	
(New Zealand) Simon Doull	New Zealand 1992–2000	(New Zealand) Sky Sport 2006–
(India) Rahul Dravid	Karnataka 1990–2012; Kent 2000; Scotland 2003; Royal Challengers Bangalore 2008–2010; Rajasthan Royals 2011–2013; India 1996–2012	(India) ESPN Star sports 2012–present (Australia) ABC 2014–2018 (India) BCCI 2012–present
(England) Neil Durden-Smith		(England) BBC Radio 1964-1975 (England) BBC Television 1967-1970
(Cricket West Indies) Jeff Dujon	Jamaica 1974–1993; West Indies 1981–1991	(England) Sky Sportsannounce
(Zimbabwe) Dean du Plessis	None	(United States) Cricinfo 2001–present
(England) Matthew Engel	None	(England) The Guardian (England) Wisden Cricketers' Almanack
(India) Farokh Engineer	India 1961–1975	(England) BBC (Test Match Special) 1986, 1990
(Sri Lanka) Premasara Epasinghe	None	Radio Ceylon/ Sri Lanka Broadcasting Corporation
(England) Percy Fender (1892–1985)	Sussex 1910–1913; Surrey 1914–1935; MCC 1920–1936; England 1921–1929	(England) BBC Radio 1936-1946 (England) BBC Television 1947
(Sri Lanka) Ranjit Fernando	Ceylon 1964–1978; Sri Lanka 1975	(United Arab Emirates) Ten Sports 2004–2009
(Australia) Aaron Finch	Australia 2011–2022	(Australia) Channel 7 2024–present
(Australia) Jack Fingleton (1908-1981)	New South Wales 1928–1940; Australia 1932–1938	
(Australia) Kate Fitzpatrick	None	Channel 9 (Australia) 1983
(Australia) Damien Fleming	Australia 1994–2001	(Australia) ABC ?–present (Australia) Fox Sports 2010–2012 (Australia) Ten Network 2013–2018 (Australia) Channel 7 2018–present
(England) Tom Fordyce	None	(England) BBC Live Text
(South Africa) Charles Fortune	None	(South Africa) SABC
(England) Graeme 'Foxy' Fowler	Lancashire 1979–1991; Durham 1992–1994; England 1982–1985	(England) BBC (Test Match Special) 1994–2005
(England) Angus Fraser	Middlesex 1984–2002; England 1989–1999	(England) BBC (Test Match Special) 2000-2010 (England) The Independent 2002–
(England) David Frith	None	(England) The Cricketer (England) Wisden Cricket Monthly 1979–1996
(England) C. B. Fry (1872-1956)	Oxford University 1892–1895; Sussex 1894–1908; England 1895–1912	(England) BBC Radio 1936–?
(New Zealand) Iain Gallaway	Otago 1946–1948	(New Zealand) Sports Roundup various media 1953–1992
(India) Sourav Ganguly	Bengal 1989–2012; Lancashire 2000; Kolkata Knight Riders 2008–2010; Pune Warriors India 2011–2012; India 1992–2008	(India) ESPN Star sports 2010–present (India) BCCI 2012–present
(England) Mike Gatting	Middlesex 1975–1998; England 1977–1994	(England) BBC (Test Match Special) 2002-2007
(India) Sunil Gavaskar	Mumbai 1966–1988; Somerset 1980; India 1971–1987	(India) ESPN Star Sports 1992– (India) BCCI (England) BBC (Test Match Special) (South Africa) SuperSport 2018
(England) Alan Gibson (1923–1997)	None	(England) BBC (Test Match Special) 1962–1975 (England) The Times
(Australia) Adam Gilchrist	New South Wales 1992–1994; Western Australia 1994–2008; Deccan Chargers 2008–2010; Middlesex 2010; Kings XI Punjab 2011–2013	(Australia) Nine Network 2008-2011 (Australia) Ten Network 2013–2018 (Australia) Fox Sports 2018–present
(England) Arthur Gilligan (1894–1976)	Cambridge University 1919–1920; Surrey 1919; Sussex 1920–1932; England 1922–1925	(Australia) ABC
(England) Rev. Frank Gillingham (1875–1953)	Essex 1903–1928	(England) BBC Radio 1927–?
(England) Graham Gooch	Essex 1973–2000; England 1978–1992	(England) BBC (Test Match Special) 2002–2009
(England) Darren Gough	Yorkshire 1989–2003; 2007–2008; Essex 2004–2006; England 1994–2006	(England) Talksport 2018–2019
(England) David Gower	Leicestershire 1975–1989; Hampshire 1990–1993; England 1978–1992	(England) BBC Television1994–1999 (England) Sky Sports 1999–2019 (England) Sunday Times
(Australia) Phil "Phil G" Gowers	None	(Switzerland) European Cricket League 2022-current
(England) Tom Graveney (1927–2015)	England 1951–1969	(England) BBC Television 1980-1991
(England) Tony Greig (1946–2012)	Sussex 1966–1978; England 1972–1977	(Australia) Nine Network 1979–2012 (England) Channel 4 2005 (United Arab Emirates) TEN Sports
(England) Isa Guha	Thames Valley 1998–1999; Berkshire 2000–present England 2002–2011	(Australia) Fox Sports 2018–present (England) ITV Sport 2010–2014 (England) BBC (Test Match Special) 2014–present (England) Sky Sports 2015–2019 (England) BBC Television 2020–present
(England) Alex Hartley	Lancashire 2008–2012; Middlesex 2013–2016; Surrey Stars 2016; Lancashire 2017–2023; England 2016–2019	(England) BBC (Test Match Special) 2020–present
(Sri Lanka) Bob Harvie	None	Radio Ceylon/ Sri Lanka Broadcasting Corporation
(Australia) Mike Haysman	Leicestershire –	(South Africa) SuperSport (Super Cricket) (United Arab Emirates) TEN Sports
(Australia) Ian Healy	Queensland 1986–1999; Australia 1988–1999	(Australia) Channel 9 1999–present (Australia) Fox Sports 2018–present
(England) Mike Hendrick (1948-2021)	England 1974-1981	(England) BBC Radio 1990-1994
(Cricket West Indies) Michael Holding	West Indies 1975–1987	(England) Sky Sports (Australia) Nine Network 1992–present
(Australia) David Hookes (1955-2004)	South Australia 1975–1992; Australia 1977–1986	
(England) Robert Hudson (1920—2010) (Note: The idea of providing complete ball-by-ball coverage of a Test match was conceived by Hudson whilst commentating with Fred Trueman on a county game at Scarborough in 1955, as a result of which Test Match Special went on air two years later.)	None	(England) BBC Television 1949–1950, 1962–1964 (England) BBC (Test Match Special) 1958, 1962–1968
(England) Simon Hughes	Middlesex 1980–1992; Durham 1992–1993	(England) The Independent (England) Daily Telegraph (England) Channel 4 1999–2005 (England) Channel 5 2006–2017 (England) BBC (Test Match Special) 2007–present
(England) Nasser Hussain	Essex 1987–2004; England 1989–2004	(England) Sky Sports 2004–present
(Australia) Michael Hussey (Note: Also known as 'Mr Cricket' due to his encyclopedic knowledge of the game.)	Western Australia 2004–2013; Australia 2004–2013	(Australia) Nine Network 2014–2016 (Australia) Fox Sports 2018–present
(England) Ray Illingworth (1932-2021)	England 1958–1973	(England) BBC Television 1984–1993
(Pakistan) Asif Iqbal	Pakistan 1964-1980	(England) BBC Television 1992, 1996
(England) Robin Jackman (1945–2020)	England 1974–1983	(South Africa) SuperSport (Super Cricket) (England) BBC Television 1987-1988, 1994
(Sri Lanka) Mahela Jayawardene	Sinhalese Sports Club 1995–2015; Sri Lanka 1997–2015	(England) Talksport 2018–2019
(England) Brian Johnston (1912–1994)	None	(England) BBC Television 1946–1969 (England) BBC (Test Match Special) 1966–1994
(Australia) Dean Jones (1961-2020)	Australia 1984–1992	(Australia) ABC (United Arab Emirates) TEN Sports 2003–2006 (India) Zee Sports 2007–2008 (Indian Cricket League) (India) NDTV 24x7 2010 (India) Star Sports 2018–2020 (Select Dugout),
(India) Dinesh Karthik	Tamil Nadu 2002–2024; Royal Challengers Bangalore 2015, 2022–2024; India 2004–2022	(England) Sky Sports 2021–present
(England) Rob Key	Kent 1998–2016; England 2002–2009	(England) Sky Sports 2012–present
(England) Nick Knight	Warwickshire 1991–2006; England 1995–2003	(England) Sky Sports 2006–present
(England) Jim Laker (1922-1986)	England 1948–1959	(England) ITV 1966–1968 (England) BBC Television 1969–1985
(India) Arun Lal	India 1982–1989	(India) Nimbus Sport 2003– (United Arab Emirates) TEN Sports 2010–
(New Zealand) Gavin Larsen	Wellington 1984–1999; New Zealand 1990–1999	
(Australia) Geoff Lawson	Australia 1989–2004	(Australia) ABC ?–present
(Australia) Bill Lawry	Victoria 1955–1972; Australia 1961–1971	(Australia) Channel 9 1977–2018
(Australia) Brett Lee	New South Wales 1997–2012; Australia 1999–2012	(Australia) Channel 9 2010–2014 (Australia) Fox Sports 2018–present
(Australia) Darren Lehmann	Australia 1996–2005	(England) Sky Sports 2005–2007; Disney+ Hotstar
(Republic of Ireland) Andrew Leonard	Ireland under-19 2010 Ireland A 2010	(England) Sky Sports 2023 (India) ESPN Star Sports 2023 (England) BBC 2023 (India) BCCI 2023
(England) Tony Lewis	Glamorgan 1955–1974; England 1972–1973	(England) BBC (Test Match Special) 1975–1984 (England) The Sunday Telegraph 1975–1993 (England) BBC Television 1984–1998
(England) David Lloyd (Note: Often referred to using the nickname 'Bumble'.)	Lancashire 1965–1983; England 1973–1980	(England) BBC (Test Match Special) 1992–1995 (England) Sky Sports 1999–2021 (Australia) Channel 9 2013–14 (The Ashes)
(England) Simon Mann	None	(England) BBC (Radio 5) 1994–1996 (England) BBC (Test Match Special) 1996–present
(India) Sanjay Manjrekar	Mumbai 1984–1998; India 1987–1996	(India) ESPN Star Sports 2009–present (United Arab Emirates) TEN Sports 2003–2009
(South Africa) Neil Manthorp	None	(South Africa) SuperSport (Super Cricket) (England) BBC (Test Match Special) 2007, 2012, 2016 (Australia) ABC ?–present (England) Talksport 2003–2008
(England) Vic Marks	Somerset 1975–1989; England 1982–1988	(England) The Observer 1989–present (England) BBC (Test Match Special) 1992–present
(Australia) Rod Marsh (1947–2022)	Australia 1970-1984	(Australia) Nine Network 1985-1990, 1996-1998
(England) Howard Marshall (1900–1973)	None	(England) BBC (BBC Radio) 1927–1945
(England) Christopher Martin–Jenkins (1945–2013)	None	(England) BBC (Test Match Special) 1973-2012 (England) BBC Television 1980–1989 (England) The Cricketer 1980–1990 (England) Daily Telegraph 1990–1998 (England) The Times 1998–2012
(Australia) Jim Maxwell	None	(Australia) ABC 1973–present (England) BBC (Test Match Special) 2005– (Ashes series);
(Zimbabwe) Mpumelelo ("Pommie") Mbangwa	Zimbabwe 1996–2002	(South Africa) SuperSport (Super Cricket) (United Arab Emirates) TEN Sports
(Australia) Alan McGilvray (1909–1996)	New South Wales 1933–1937	(Australia) ABC 1938–1985 (England) BBC (Test Match Special) 1948–1985 (Ashes series)
(Australia) Glenn McGrath	New South Wales 1992–2008; Australia 1993–2007; Worcestershire 2000; Middlesex 2004; Delhi Daredevils 2008–2010	Channel 7 (Australia) 2018–present (England) BBC (Test Match Special) 2019 (Ashes series)
(Australia) Cate McGregor	None	(Australia) The Australian (Australia) Australian Financial Review (England) The Spectator
(India) Vijay Merchant (1936–1952)	India 1936–1952	All India Radio
(England) Colin Milburn (1941–1990)	Northamptonshire 1960–1969; England 1966–1969	(England) BBC Television 1969 (England) BBC (Test Match Special) 1983–1988
(Australia) Keith Miller (1919-2004)	Australia 1946-1956	(England) BBC Television 1977-1979
(England) Alison Mitchell	None	(England) BBC (BBC Radio 5 Live; Test Match Special) 2003–present (India) ESPN Star sports 2013, 2014; ABC 2014– Channel 7 (Australia) 2018–present (England) Channel 5 2018–2019 (England) BBC Television 2020–present
(Australia) Glenn Mitchell	None	(Australia) ABC 1990–2011
(Australia) Tom Moody	Australia 1987-1999	(Australia) Nine Network 2002-2018
(Republic of Ireland) (England) Eoin Morgan	Surrey 2005–present Ireland 2007–2009; England 2010 - 2022	(England) Sky Sports 2022–present
(Australia) Drew Morphett	None	(Australia) ABC 197?–2015
(New Zealand) Danny Morrison	New Zealand 1987–1997	(New Zealand) Sky Sport 2000–present (Australia) Fox Sports (Australia) ABC ?–present
(England) Don Mosey (1925–1999)	None	(England) BBC (Test Match Special) 1974–1991
(Australia) Johnny Moyes (1893–1963)	South Australia 1912–1915; Victoria 1920–1921	(Australia) ABC 1950–1963
(England) Brian Murgatroyd	None	(United Arab Emirates) TEN Sports ca.2008–present Others?
(India) Chandra Nayudu	Uttar Pradesh	All India Radio
(England) Mark Nicholas	Hampshire 1978–1995	(England) Sky Sports 1995–1998 (England) Channel 4 1999–2005 (England) Daily Telegraph (Australia) Nine Network 2001–2018 (South Africa) SuperSport 2018– (England) Channel 5 2006–2019 (England) Talksport 2018–2019
(Australia) Monty Noble (1873–1940)	New South Wales 1893–1919; Australia 1898–1909	(Australia) ABC
(England) Daniel Norcross	None	(England) BBC (Test Match Special) 2015–present
(Australia) Simon O'Donnell	Australia 1985-1991	(Australia) Nine Network 1988–2011
(Australia) Kerry O'Keeffe	New South Wales 1968–1980; Australia 1971–1977	ABC 2001–2014 Fox Sports (Australia) 2018–present,
(Sri Lanka) Norton Pereira	None	Radio Ceylon/ Sri Lanka Broadcasting Corporation
(Sri Lanka) Palitha Perera	None	Radio Ceylon/ Sri Lanka Broadcasting Corporation
(India) Nandan Phadnis	Maharashtra 1986–1996	All India Radio; NDTV
(England) Marjorie Pollard (1899–1982)	None	(England) BBC Radio 1938
(South Africa) Shaun Pollock	KwaZulu Natal 1992–2004 (England) Warwickshire 1996–2002; South Africa 1995–2008	(South Africa) SuperSport 2008–present (England) Sky Sports
(Australia) Ricky Ponting	Tasmania 1992–2013; Australia 1995–2012	(Australia) Ten Network 2013–2018 (Australia) Seven Network 2018–present
(India) Venkatesh Prasad	India 1996–2001	(India) SET Max 2003
(Pakistan) Ramiz Raja	Servis Industries 1977–1978; Punjab 1978; Lahore City 1979–1983, 1985–1987, 1992–1993; Allied Bank Limited 1983–1984, 1994–1998; Pakistan National Shipping Corporation 1988–1991; Islamabad 1994; Pakistan 1984–1997	(United Arab Emirates) TEN Sports (England) BBC (Test Match Special) 2007-2012, 2019
(England) Ebony Rainford-Brent	England 2001-2010	(England) BBC Radio 2015–present (England) BBC Television 2021–present
(England) Dermot Reeve	Sussex 1983–1987; Warwickshire 1988–1996; Somerset 1998; MCC 1990; England 1991–1996	(England) BBC Television 1997-1999 (England) Channel 4 1999–2005
(South Africa) Barry Richards	South Africa 1970	(United Arab Emirates) TEN Sports (England) BBC Television 1998-1999 (England) Channel Four 2000-2002
(Cricket West Indies) Viv Richards	West Indies 1974-1991	(England) BBC Radio 1999-2014 (not all years) (England) BBC Television 1999
(New Zealand) Mark Richardson	New Zealand 2000–2004	(New Zealand) Sky Sport 2006–present (New Zealand) The Crowd Goes Wild 2006–present
(Australia) Vic Richardson (1894–1969)	Australia 1927–1936	(Australia) ABC 1929–?
(Australia) Greg Ritchie	Australia 1982-1987	(Australia) Nine Network 1992-1997
(England) R C Robertson–Glasgow (1901-1965)	Somerset 1920–1935	(England) The Morning Post (England) The Observer (England) BBC Television 1947-1948
(England) Peter Roebuck (1956–2011)	Somerset 1974–1991	(Australia) ABC 2001–2011
(Sri Lanka) Kumar Sangakkara	Nondescripts 1998–2014; Sri Lanka 2000–2015	(England) Sky Sports 2018–present
(England) Mike Selvey	Surrey 1968–1971; Middlesex 1972–1982; Glamorgan 1983–1984; England 1976–1977	(England) BBC (Test Match Special) 1984–2008 (England) The Guardian 1985–present
(India) Ravi Shastri	Mumbai 1979–1994; Glamorgan 1987–1989, 1991; India 1981–1992	(India) ESPN Star sports 1994–present (India) BCCI 2006–present (England) BBC Television 1996, 1999
(India) Anand Setalvad		All India Radio
(India) Navjot Singh Sidhu	Punjab 1981–1999; India 1983–1999	(India) ESPN Star sports 1999–2003 (United Arab Emirates) TEN Sports 2003–2004 (India) NDTV 24x7 2006–2009 (India) Times Now 2010–present
(India) Laxman Sivaramakrishnan	India1983–1987	(India) Nimbus Sport (India) BCCI (India) Star Sports Tamil 2017–present
(Australia) Michael Slater	New South Wales 1991–2001; Australia 1993–2001	(England) Channel 4 2001–2005 (England) Sky Sports 2006 (Australia) ABC ?–? (Australia) Channel 9 2006–2018 (Australia) Channel 7 2018–2021
(England) Ed Smith	Middlesex 2005–2008; Kent 1996–2004	(England) BBC (Test Match Special) 2012–2018
(New Zealand) Ian Smith	New Zealand 1980–1992	(New Zealand) Sky Sport Channel 4 1999–2003
(Pakistan) Aamer Sohail	Lahore 1983–1999; Habib Bank Limited 1987–1992; Allied Bank Limited 1995–2001; Karachi 1998–1999; Lahore 2000–2001; Somerset 2001; Pakistan 1990–2000	(United Arab Emirates) Ten Sports 2001–present
(Australia) Keith Stackpole	Victoria 1959–1974; Australia 1966–1974	(Australia) ABC ?–2005 (Australia) Nine Network 1977-1986
(England) Andrew Strauss	England 2003-2012	(England) Sky Sports 2013–present
(New Zealand) Scott Styris	New Zealand 2002–	(New Zealand) ) 2006 (India) Star Sports 2018–present (Select Dugout)
(India) Pearson Surita		All India Radio
(England) Graeme Swann	Northamptonshire 1998–2004; Nottinghamshire 2005–2013	(England) BBC Radio (Test Match Special) 2014–2019
(England) E. W. (Jim) Swanton (1907–2000)	Middlesex 1937–8	(England) BBC Radio 1938–1956 (England) BBC (Test Match Special) 1957–1975 (England) BBC Television 1948–1967 (England) The Daily Telegraph 1946–1975
(Barbados) Donna Symmonds	None	(Barbados) Caribbean Broadcasting Corporation 1988–? (England) BBC (Test Match Special) 1998-2000
(India) A.F.S. "Bobby" Talyarkhan		All India Radio 1936-1973
(Australia) Mark Taylor	New South Wales 1985–1999; Australia 1989–1999	(Australia) Channel 9 1999–present
(England) Fred Trueman (1931–2006)	Yorkshire 1949–1969; England 1952–1965	(England) BBC (Test Match Special) 1974–1999 (Australia) Channel 9 1977–1978
(England) Phil Tufnell	Middlesex 1986–2002; England 1990–2001	(England) BBC (Test Match Special) 2003–present (Australia) Channel 7 2018 (England) BBC Television 2020–present
(England) Frank Tyson (1930-2015)	England 1954-1959	(England) BBC Television 1977-1983
(India) Polly Umrigar	India 1948–1962	All India Radio
(England) Michael Vaughan	Yorkshire 1993–2009; England 1999–2008	(England) Channel 5 2009–2019 (England) BBC (Test Match Special) 2009–present (Australia) Fox sports 2018–present (England) BBC Television 2020–present
(England) Dudley Vernon	None	(England) BBC Television 1946–?
(New Zealand) Bryan Waddle	None	Radio New Zealand; Radio Sport (Australia) ABC ?–present
(Australia) Max Walker (1948–2016)	Victoria 1969–1982; Australia 1972–1981	(Australia) ABC 1981–1985 (Australia) Channel 9 1986–1991
(England) Ian Ward	Surrey 1992–2003; Sussex 2003–2005; England 2001	(England) Sky Sports 2003–present
(England) Sir Pelham Warner (1873–1963)	Oxford University 1894–1896; Middlesex 1894–1920	(England) BBC Radio 1927–?
(Australia) Shane Warne (1969–2022)	Hampshire 2000–2007; Australia 1992–2006; Rajasthan Royals 2008–2010; Victoria 1990–2006	(Australia) Nine Network 2008–2018 (England) Sky Sports 2009–2022 (India) Star Sports 2013–2022 (India) BCCI 2012–2022 (Australia) Fox Sports 2018–2022
(Australia) Len Watt	None	(Australia) Local radio, Sydney 1922 (Note: The first ever broadcast coverage of a cricket match anywhere in the world – a testimonial game for Charles Bannerman (1851–1930) at the SCG between two teams from New South Wales) (Australia) ABC 1924–?
(Australia) Mark Waugh	New South Wales 1985–2004; Essez 1988–1989; Australia 1988–2002	(Australia) Ten Network 2013–2018 (Australia) Fox sports 2018–present
(Cricket West Indies) Everton Weekes (1925-2020)	West Indies 1948-1958	(England) BBC Television 1976, 1979
(South Africa) Kepler Wessels	Queensland 1979–1986; Australia 1982–1985; South Africa 1992–94; Sussex 1976–1980	(South Africa) SuperSport (Super Cricket)
(England) Peter West (1920–2003)	None	(England) BBC Radio 1948–1959 (England) BBC Television 1952–1986
(England) Arlo White	None	(England) BBC (Test Match Special) 2005–2008
(England) Alan Wilkins	Glamorgan 1975–1979, 1983; Gloucestershire 1980–1982	(England) BBC 1987–1998 (India) ESPN Star Sports 2000–present
(England) Bob Willis (1949–2019)	Surrey, Warwickshire 1969–1984; England 1971–1984	(England) BBC Television 1985-1987 (England) Sky Sports 1990-2019
(England) John Woodcock	None	(England) The Guardian (England) The Times
(England) Thomas Woodrooffe (1899-1978)	None	(England) BBC Television 1939
(Australia) Bruce Yardley (1947-2019)	Australia 1978-1983	(Australia) Nine Network 1989-199?
(England) Norman Yardley (1915–1989)	Yorkshire 1935–1955; England 1938–1950	(England) BBC Radio (Test Match Special) 1956–1969
(Pakistan) Waqar Younis	Karachi, Lahore, Multan, National Bank of Pakistan, Rawalpindi, Redco Pakistan Ltd, United Bank Limited 1989–2003; Surrey 1990–1993; Glamorgan 1997–1998; Warwickshire 2003; Pakistan 1989–2003	(United Arab Emirates) TEN Sports 2010–present

== See also ==
- ABC Radio National and Timeline of Australian radio
- BBC Radio and Timeline of the BBC

== Bibliography ==
- Benaud, Richie (2005). My Spin on Cricket. London: Hodder & Stoughton. ISBN 0-340-83393-9.
- Martin-Jenkins, Christopher (1990). Ball by Ball : The Story of Cricket Broadcasting. London: Grafton Books. ISBN 0-246-13568-9.
- Peel, Mark (1998). Cricketing Falstaff : A Biography of Colin Milburn. London: André Deutsch. ISBN 0-233-99026-7.
