= Rizwan Aslam =

Pakistani cricketer (born 1975)

Personal information
- Full name: Mohammad Rizwan Aslam
- Born: 23 February 1975 (age 51); Lahore, Punjab
- Batting: Right-handed
- Bowling: Right-arm off break
- Role: Opening batsman

Domestic team information
- Years: Team
- 1998/99: Sargodha
- 1999/00–2006/07: Lahore
- 2003/04–2004/05: Allied Bank Limited

Career statistics
Competition	First-class	List A
Matches	24	12
Runs scored	1,247	290
Batting average	32.81	24.16
100s/50s	2/5	0/2
Top score	209*	81
Catches/stumpings	7/–	2/–
- Source: CricketArchive

Mohammad Rizwan Aslam (born 23 February 1975) is a former Pakistani first-class and List A cricketer, who scored over 1200 first-class runs. He is a left-handed batsman and right-arm off-break bowler.

== Domestic career ==
Aslam's brief domestic career included seven half-centuries and two centuries, with both of the centuries and five half-centuries being scored in first-class matches, while the rest in List A matches.

At domestic level, he played in 24 first-class and 12 List A matches representing the Lahore cricket teams and Sargodha. He made his first-class debut for Lahore City on 20 November 1999 during the 1999–2000 Quaid-e-Azam Trophy, while he made his List A debut for Sargodha on 10 April 1999 during the 1998–99 Tissot Cup.

In December 2002, Aslamscored his career best score of an unbeaten 209 runs playing for Lahore Whites against Gujranwala during the 2002–03 Quaid-e-Azam Trophy, which helped the Whites to win over Gujranwala at a big margin. He was also the second highest run-scorer for Lahore Whites in that tournament, aggregating 295 runs.
