= Atif Rauf =

Pakistani cricketer (born 1964)

Personal information
- Full name: Atif Rauf
- Born: 3 March 1964 (age 62); Lahore, Punjab, Pakistan
- Batting: Right-handed
- Bowling: Right-arm off break
- Relatives: Rameez Raja (cousin); Wasim Raja (cousin); Zaeem Raja (cousin)

International information
- National side: Pakistan (1994)
- Only Test (cap 131): 24 February 1994 v New Zealand

Career statistics
Competition	Tests	First-class
Matches	1	142
Runs scored	25	7885
Batting average	12.50	39.82
100s/50s	-/-	17/43
Top score	16	200
Balls bowled	-	315
Wickets	-	2
Bowling average	-	145.00
5 wickets in innings	-	-
10 wickets in match	-	-
Best bowling	-	1/29
Catches/stumpings	-/-	73/-
- Source: ESPNcricinfo, 27 February 2011

Atif Rauf (born March 3, 1964) is a Pakistani former cricketer and umpire. He played in one Test against New Zealand in 1994. A right-handed batsman and occasional off spin bowler, he scored 16 and 9 in his only Test appearance.

He is a cousin of Pakistani cricketers Wasim Raja, Rameez Raja and Zaeem Raja.
