= Dean du Plessis =

Zimbabwean cricket commentator

Dean Du Plessis
- Born: Harare, Zimbabwe
- Occupation: Cricket commentator

Dean Du Plessis is a Zimbabwean cricket commentator. He is the world's first visually impaired cricket commentator to participate in international matches.

== Early life ==
Dean was born with tumors behind both retinas, destroying his eyesight before birth. He subsequently had both eyes removed, and currently wears glass eyes. Dean's brother Gary played first class cricket in Zimbabwe for the Mashonaland A cricket team. Dean started his love affair with cricket in 1991, when South Africa were re-admitted into the international cricketing fraternity and he was a student a boarding school in Worcester, South Africa. He used to spend his pocket money in calling up ZBC Radio 1 in Zimbabwe to know the scores, when the Zimbabwe national cricket team were given test status in 1992.

== Career ==
Dean's obsession for the game saw him collect the home phone numbers of Dave Houghton, Grant Flower and Alistair Campbell and discuss cricket in length with them. His knowledge about the game impressed Ravi Shastri, who allowed Dean to sit in the commentary box. The commentators eventually started chatting with him, and asking for his opinions. His first stint as a commentator was when his childhood friend Neil Manthorp, who was doing radio commentary for Cricinfo allowed him a 15-minute stint. Dean's knowledge impressed the Cricinfo team, who hired him for the rest of the series.

His television debut was in 2003 with Mike Haysman during Zimbabwe's second one-day international with West Indies at the Queens Sports Club, in Bulawayo. He has traveled to South Africa and Bangladesh as part of the commentary team for different studios. He has also been a regular contributor and columnist for The Herald and The Daily News since 2010.

== Technique ==
Dean is wired to the stump microphone, and bases his commentary on the sounds that he picks up. He can make out the bowler from their landing and how they grunt. His assessment of the batsman's shots is based on the length of the time between the ball pitching and hitting the bat, shuffle of the batsman's feet, and the type of noise emanating from the bat striking the ball. He also uses the calls of different batsman, the shouts of the fielders and the sound of the crowd to deduce where the ball has gone after the batsman has played his shot. His commentary is also peppered with the statistics and conversations that he has imbibed over the last 20 years.
