= Zaeem Raja =

Pakistani cricketer (born 1956)

Personal information
- Full name: Zaeem Hasan Raja
- Born: 24 October 1956 (age 70); Lahore, Punjab, Pakistan
- Relatives: Saleem Akhtar (father); Wasim Raja (brother); Rameez Raja (brother); Atif Rauf (cousin)

Domestic team information
- Years: Team
- 1971/72: Multan
- 1972/73-1974/75: Lahore
- 1975/76: Bahawalpur
- 1977/78: Service Industries

Career statistics
Competition	First-class	List A
Matches	15	1
Runs scored	411	0
Batting average	17.86	0.00
100s/50s	0/1	0/0
Top score	61	0
Balls bowled	619	–
Wickets	5	–
Bowling average	66.40	–
5 wickets in innings	0	–
10 wickets in match	0	–
Best bowling	1/16	–
Catches/stumpings	7/–	0/–
- Source: ESPNcricinfo, 14 April 2018

Zaeem Hasan Raja (Punjabi, Urdu: زعیم حسن راجہ) (born 24 October 1956) is a Pakistani former cricketer who played first-class cricket, for Service Industries, Lahore, Bahawalpur and Multan. Born in Lahore in 1956, his brothers, Wasim Raja and Rameez Raja played for Pakistan while his father, Saleem Akhtar, played first-class cricket.
