= Chandra Nayudu =

Indian cricket commentator (1933–2021)

- Born: 1933; Indore, Indore State, British India
- Died: 4 April 2021 (aged 88); Indore, Madhya Pradesh, India
- Occupations: Sports commentator, cricketer, professor

Chandra Nayudu (1933 – 4 April 2021) was an Indian cricket commentator, cricketer, professor, and author. She was India's first female cricket commentator, as well as one of India's earliest woman cricketers.

== Life and family ==
Chandra Nayudu was born in 1933 in a Telugu-speaking Kapu family. Her father, C. K. Nayudu, was a well-known cricketer and the captain of India's first Test cricket team. She was the youngest of the three daughters of C. K. Nayudu from his first wife. Her uncle C. S. Nayudu also played for India, while her nephew Vijay Nayudu was a first-class cricketer. Her ancestors hailed from Machilipatnam town in Andhra Pradesh.

== Career ==
Nayudu graduated with a degree in English, and taught English at a government college in Indore, Madhya Pradesh. Nayudu competed briefly in domestic women's cricket, leading the first Uttar Pradesh women's cricket team, and played cricket for her college, before taking up cricket commentary in the 1970s. She was India's first female cricket commentator. She began her career in commentary in a match between the touring Marylebone Cricket Club (MCC) vs. Bombay in the 1976–77 season, and continued to comment for domestic and international matches in Hindi and English. She was also a commentator during the English team's tour of India in 1979-1980 for India's public broadcaster, All India Radio, and later recorded her experiences in cricket commentary for an interview with cricket historian David Rayvern Allen, archived with Lord's. According to Nayudu, she was the first female international cricket commentator, preceding an Australian woman commentator. In an interview with Cricinfo, she stated that her interest in cricket commentary began as a way of honoring her father's achievements in cricket. In 1982, she was invited to the Golden Jubilee Test Match between India and England.

She was a life member of the Madhya Pradesh Cricket Association, and undertook several efforts to promote women's cricket in the region, including establishing an inter-university tournament. According to her nephew, former cricketer Vijay Nayudu, she created several trophies in memory of her parents for cricket tournaments, including the presentation of a silver bat to the Cricket Club of India, and a collegiate memorial trophy for her mother. Her last posting was as a principal in early 1990 at the Government Girls PG College in Indore. In 1995, she published a memoir of her father titled C.K. Nayudu: A Daughter Remembers.

== Death ==
Nayudu lived at Manorama Ganj in Indore, close to the Holkar Stadium, where her father frequently played. She died in Indore on 4 April 2021 at the age of 88.

== Publications ==
- Chandra K. Nayudu, C.K. Nayudu: A Daughter Remembers (New Delhi, Rupa Publications 1995), ISBN 9788171672837
