= Mohammad Nawaz (cricketer, born 1970) =

Pakistani cricketer (born 1970)

Personal information
- Full name: Mohammad Nawaz
- Born: 10 November 1970 (age 56); Sargodha, Punjab, Pakistan
- Batting: Right-handed
- Bowling: Right-arm off break
- Role: Batsman

Domestic team information
- Years: Team
- Sargodha
- Faisalabad
- Allied Bank Limited
- Islamabad

Career statistics
Competition	First-class	List A
Matches	154	69
Runs scored	7,835	1,754
Batting average	31.21	26.17
100s/50s	15/40	1/11
Top score	202*	109
Balls bowled	5,688	1,851
Wickets	75	56
Bowling average	32.44	24.12
5 wickets in innings	0	1
10 wickets in match	0	0
Best bowling	4/41	5/25
Catches/stumpings	107/–	21/–
- Source: Cricinfo, 1 May 2026

Mohammad Nawaz (born 10 November 1970) is a Pakistani former cricketer. Nawaz was a right-handed batsman who bowled right-arm off break. He was born in Sargodha, Punjab, and played domestic cricket in Pakistan for Sargodha, Faisalabad, Allied Bank Limited and Islamabad.

Nawaz made his first-class debut in the 1985–86 season, and went on to play a domestic career that lasted until 2001–02. His highest first-class score was an unbeaten 202, and over the course of his career he made 15 centuries and 40 half-centuries.

Although primarily a batsman, Nawaz also made regular contributions with the ball. In first-class cricket he took 75 wickets, with best figures of 4 for 41, though he did not record a five-wicket haul. In List A cricket, however, he was more effective as a bowler, taking 56 wickets at an average of 24.12, including his only five-wicket haul in recognized senior cricket, 5 for 25.

In 2000, while playing for Allied Bank against Pakistan Customs in the 2000–01 One Day Tournament (Departments), he scored 24 and took 2 for 23, contributing in a 17-run victory at Jinnah Stadium, Gujranwala.

Overall, Nawaz played in 154 first-class matches, scoring 7,835 runs at a batting average of 31.21, with 15 centuries and 40 fifties. In List A cricket, he played 69 matches and scored 1,754 runs at an average of 26.17, including one century and 11 fifties.
