= Sadiq Ali Shahzad =

Sadiq Ali Shahzad (1951–2016) was a Pakistani sculptor.

== Biography ==
Sadiq Ali Shahzad was from Multan. Without any formal education, he began creating paintings and sculptures.

He has made sculptures which are always on display at his workshop and Multan Arts Council in Multan. An art gallery is dedicated to him permanently in Multan Arts Council for this purpose. He was also given status of honorary sculptor at Bahauddin Zakariya University Multan. His work has been exhibited in Al Hamra Art Gallery.

== Work ==
Shahzad's work challenged conventional art norms. While technically sculptures, their size, naturalistic approach, and clear narratives leaned more towards the definition of statues.

Shahzad's pieces communicated specific cultural ideas, stepping beyond artistic boundaries and suggesting a rethinking of aesthetic standards.

His work was reminiscent of cinema and imagery, known for their direct and effective communication. The sculptures presented relatable, emotionally charged narratives that received high public appreciation. Although Shahzad's exhibition may not have been groundbreaking, it raised important questions for local artists about bridging the gap between sculptures and statues, thereby preventing the art from becoming a domain exclusive to the elite.
