= Andrew Leonard (commentator) =

Irish cricket commentator

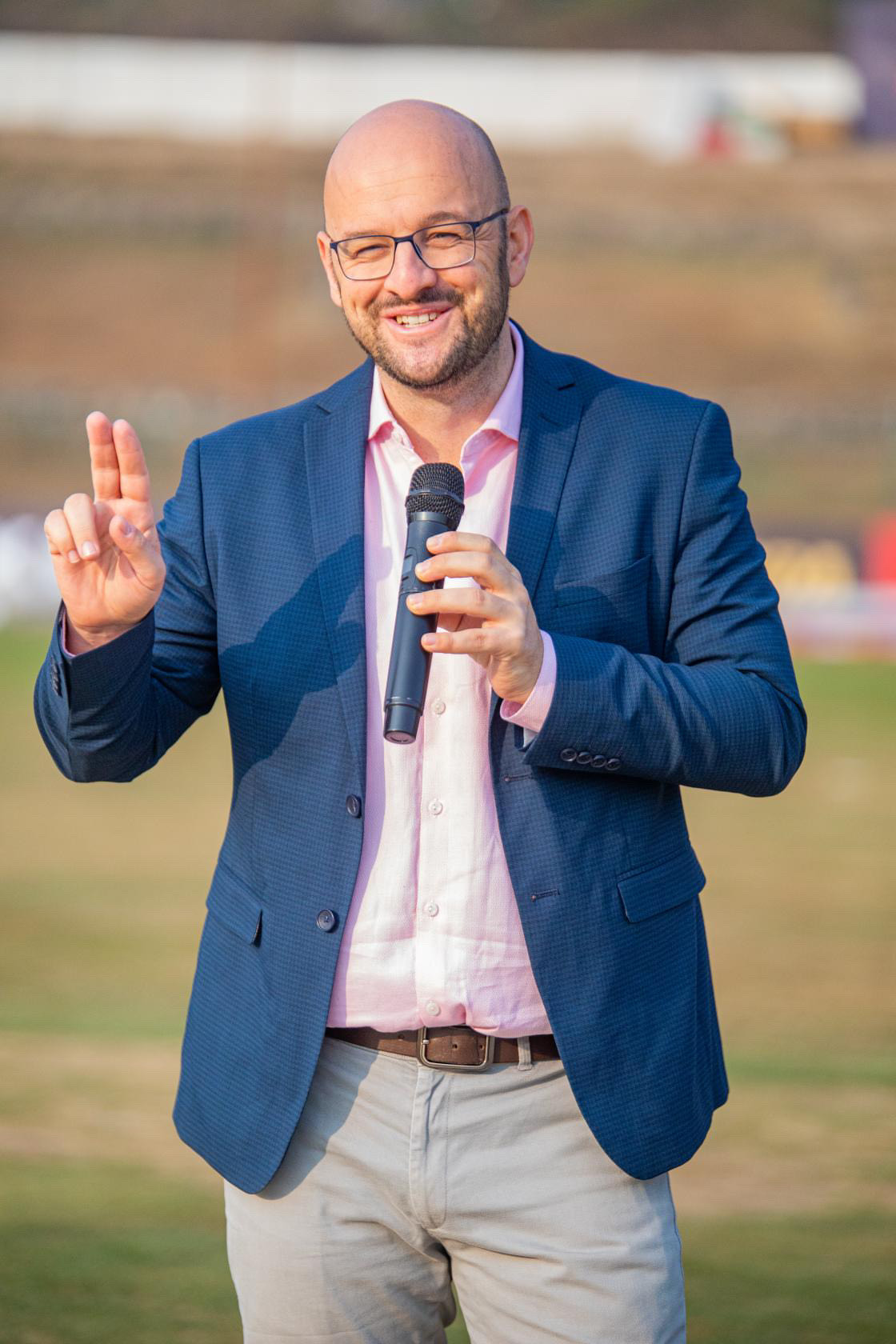

Personal information
- Full name: Andrew Leonard
- Nickname: Taklu Dai
- Nationality: Irish
- Born: Dublin, Ireland
- Occupations: Commentator, Presenter, Digital Media, Broadcasting, Leg spinner
- Employers: ICC, Cricket Ireland
- Height: 6 ft 0 in (183 cm)

Sport
- Sport: Cricket

Andrew Leonard is an Irish cricket commentator, presenter, and advocate for associate cricket. He's known for his extensive work with the ICC, broadcasting pathway events, and bringing passion to the game, having commentated over 500 international matches. He is especially beloved in Nepal, where fans call him "टक्लु दाइ" (Bald Big Brother) for his support of and commentary on Nepal during ICC events.

== Early life and career ==
Leonard played cricket at both Irish and Leinster Youth levels, representing Ireland in the under-19 team alongside notable players such as Kevin O'Brien, Boyd Rankin, and William Porterfield. Additionally, Leonard spent two years at the Hampshire County Cricket Club Academy in Southampton, England, where he developed as a leg spinner alongside Tim Tremlett and Steve Snell.

Administrative roles within cricket organizations paved the way for Leonard's eventual venture into cricket commentary and broadcasting.

== Commentary and broadcasting ==
His debut as a commentator came during an international match between Ireland and Afghanistan.

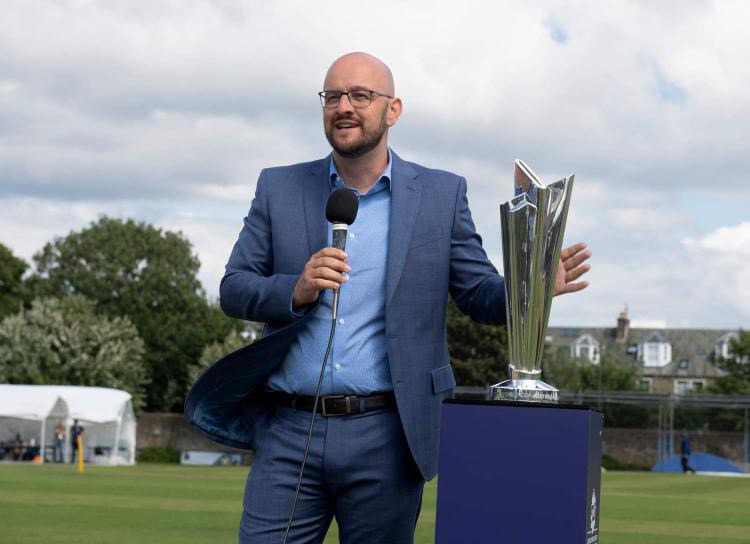
Leonard with the ICC trophy during the ICC event.

Leonard caught the attention of Nepali broadcasters who invited him to join the commentary team for the Everest Premier League in 2018 and Nepal premier league. Since then, he has been a supporter and advocate for Nepal cricket and its fan base.

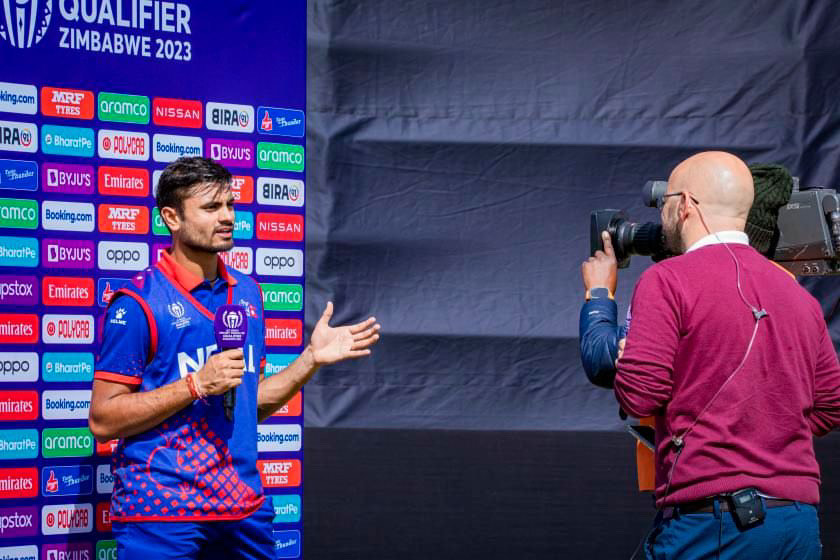
Leonard with Nepal's Gulshan Jha

Leonard serves as the lead commentator on ICC's pathway events. which broadcast World Cup and T20 World Cup qualification matches for both men and women around the world. This project commenced in 2020, marking the first time such extensive coverage was provided, with over 540 games broadcast by the ICC in collaboration with IMG. Throughout his career, Leonard has commentated on over 500 international matches, from all corners of the world. Additionally, Leonard was involved at the 2022 Under-19 Men's Cricket World Cup in Trinidad. During the tournament, Leonard was on call when an earthquake rocked the Media Center at the Queen's Park Oval.

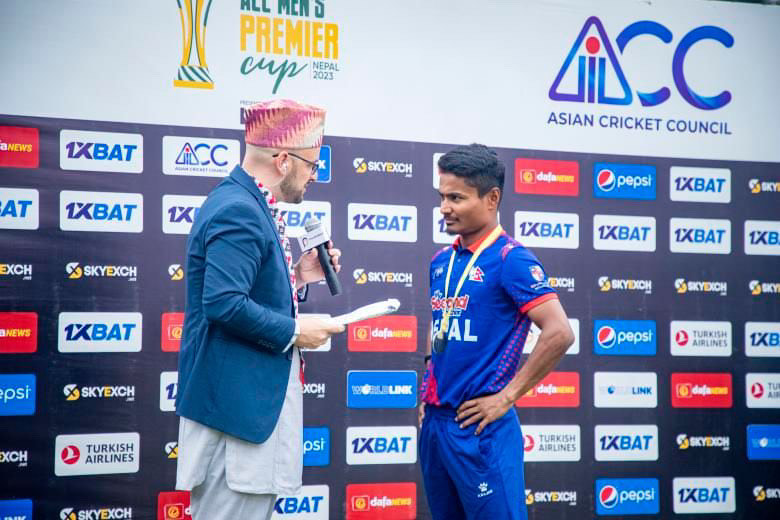
Leonard with Nepal skipper Rohit Paudel during the Presentation.

== Advocacy for associate cricket ==
During his tenure at the ICC, Leonard advocated for increased coverage of associate cricket matches. Leonard worked to ensure that associate cricket received adequate attention. His efforts helped contribute to the expansion of coverage for associate cricket matches, aiming to showcase the talent and passion present in cricket-playing nations worldwide.

== See also ==
- List of cricket commentators
- Cricket in Ireland
- Associate international cricket
