= Ranil Abeynaike =

Sri Lankan cricketer

Personal information
- Full name: Ranil Gemunu Abeynaike
- Born: 12 February 1955; Mount Lavinia, Dominion of Ceylon
- Died: 21 February 2012 (aged 57); Colombo, Sri Lanka
- Batting: Right-handed
- Bowling: Slow left-arm orthodox

Domestic team information
- Years: Team
- 1978–1982: Bedfordshire
- 1988/89–1989/90: Sinhalese Sports Club

Career statistics
Competition	First-class	List A
Matches	14	6
Runs scored	412	136
Batting average	24.23	136.00
100s/50s	0/3	0/0
Top score	66	46*
Balls bowled	868	164
Wickets	9	2
Bowling average	40.00	57.50
5 wickets in innings	1	0
10 wickets in match	0	0
Best bowling	6/131	2/21
Catches/stumpings	6/–	2/–
- Source: Cricinfo, 14 September 2011

Ranil Gemunu Abeynaike (12 February 1955 – 21 February 2012) was a Sri Lankan cricketer. Abeynaike was a right-handed batsman who bowled slow left-arm orthodox. Born at Mount Lavinia, he was educated at S. Thomas' College Mount Lavinia, in the Dominion of Ceylon (today Sri Lanka). He was the son of Orville Abeynaike.

== International career ==
Abeynaike made his first-class debut for the Mercantile Cricket Association against the Pakistan Under-25s. His first first-class match for Sri Lanka came against Tamil Nadu in the 1974/75 Gopalan Trophy. A further first-class appearance followed in 1976, when he was a part of the Sri Lanka Board President's XI team which played the touring Pakistanis. A year later he appeared for Sri Lanka in a first-class match against the touring Marylebone Cricket Club, who he also made his List A debut against.

== English County Cricket ==
In 1978, Abeynaike joined English county Bedfordshire, making his debut against Cambridgeshire in that seasons Minor Counties Championship. Following the 1978 season, he returned to Sri Lanka where he made two List A appearances for the Sri Lanka Board President's XI against the touring West Indians.

Over the coming seasons he continued to play in England for Bedfordshire, playing Minor counties cricket from 1978 to 1982 (with the exception of 1980), making 38 Minor Counties Championship appearances, as well as a single List A appearance in the 1982 NatWest Trophy against Somerset.

== Sinhalese Sports Club ==
By 1983, Sri Lanka had Test status, but Abeynaike never gained full international honours. He played for the Sri Lanka Board President's XI in 1983 against the touring Australians, he later joined the Sinhalese Sports Club, who he made his debut for in a List A match in the final of the 1988/89 Brown's Trophy against the Nondescripts Cricket Club. He made a further List A appearance the following season, in a repeat of the previous seasons final. The Sinhalese Sports Club won both matches. In the 1989/90 season, Abeynaike made eight first-class appearances for the club, the last of which came against the Cambrians Sports Club.

== Career statistics ==
In his first-class career, he played fourteen matches, scoring 412 runs at an average of 24.23, with a high score of 66. With the ball, he took 9 wickets at a bowling average of 40.00, with best figures of 6/131. In List A cricket, he scored 136 runs at an average of 136.00 (this inflated average was down to three not outs in his four innings), with a high score of 46 not out. With the ball, he took 2 wickets at an average of 57.50, with best figures of 2/21.

== Later life and death ==
Abeynaike acted as an international commentator on cricket for United Arab Emirates based sports broadcaster TEN Sports from 2004 onwards. He died at a hospital in Colombo on 21 February 2012, following a heart attack.
