= Saleem Akhtar =

Pakistani cricketer (1923–2004)

Personal information
- Full name: Raja Saleem Akhtar
- Born: 8 September 1923; Gujranwala, Punjab, British India
- Died: 22 April 2004 (aged 80); Lahore, Punjab, Pakistan
- Batting: Right-handed
- Bowling: Legbreak, googly
- Relatives: Wasim Raja (son); Ramiz Raja (son); Zaeem Raja (son)

Domestic team information
- Years: Team
- 1958/59–1959/60: Multan
- 1961/62–1962/63: Sargodha

Career statistics
Competition	First-class
Matches	10
Runs scored	187
Batting average	10.38
100s/50s	0/1
Top score	63
Balls bowled	586
Wickets	17
Bowling average	18.29
5 wickets in innings	1
10 wickets in match	0
Best bowling	5/34
Catches/stumpings	5/–
- Source: ESPNcricinfo, 15 April 2018

Raja Saleem Akhtar (Punjabi, Urdu: راجہ سلیم اختر) (8 September 1923 – 22 April 2004) was a Pakistani cricketer who played first-class cricket for Multan and Sargodha. His two sons Wasim Raja and Ramiz Raja played for the Pakistan cricket team, while another son Zaeem Raja played first-class cricket.

Raja was born in a Punjabi Muslim family. He worked as a civil servant and was a police commissioner.
