= Naeem Khan (cricketer) =

Pakistani cricketer

Personal information
- Full name: Naeem Ahmed Khan
- Born: 14 April 1971 (age 55); Sargodha, Pakistan
- Batting: Right-handed
- Bowling: Right-arm fast-medium

Domestic team information
- Years: Team
- 1985-86 to 1994-95: Sargodha
- 1990-91 to 1992-93: Habib Bank Limited

Career statistics
Competition	FC	List A
Matches	58	33
Runs scored	660	167
Batting average	10.00	11.92
100s/50s	0/0	0/0
Top score	45	44 not out
Balls bowled	6748	1266
Wickets	148	47
Bowling average	25.22	20.34
5 wickets in innings	9	0
10 wickets in match	3
Best bowling	8/25	4/28
Catches/stumpings	15/–	5/–
- Source: Cricket Archive, 17 September 2014

Naeem Khan (born 14 April 1971 in Sargodha, Pakistan) is a former Pakistani cricketer who played first-class cricket from 1985 to 1994.

A right-arm opening bowler, Naeem Khan made his first-class debut in the 1985-86 season. His best bowling figures came in 1986-87, when he took 8 for 25 for Sargodha. State Bank of Pakistan needed only 119 to win, but Khan bowled them out for 54. He also bowled Karachi Blues out for 54 in 1991-92, taking 6 for 19 (and 11 for 105 in the match, his best match figures).

In February 2021, he began to undertake coaching courses with the Pakistan Cricket Board.
