= Wasim Raja =

British Pakistani schoolteacher (1952–2006)

Personal information
- Full name: Wasim Hasan Raja
- Born: 3 July 1952; Multan, Punjab, Pakistan
- Died: 23 August 2006 (aged 54); Marlow, Buckinghamshire, England
- Batting: Left-handed
- Bowling: Leg spin
- Relatives: Rameez Raja (brother); Zaeem Raja (brother); Saleem Akhtar (father); Atif Rauf (cousin)

International information
- National side: Pakistan (1973–1985)
- Test debut (cap 67): 2 February 1973 v England
- Last Test: 25 January 1985 v New Zealand
- ODI debut (cap 11): 11 February 1973 v New Zealand
- Last ODI: 10 March 1985 v India

Career statistics
Competition	Test	ODI
Matches	57	54
Runs scored	2,821	782
Batting average	36.16	22.34
100s/50s	4/18	0/2
Top score	125	60
Balls bowled	4,082	1,036
Wickets	51	21
Bowling average	35.80	32.71
5 wickets in innings	0	0
10 wickets in match	0	0
Best bowling	4/50	4/25
Catches/stumpings	20/–	24/–
- Source: ESPNCricinfo, 4 February 2017

Wasim Hasan Raja (Punjabi, Urdu: وسیم حسن راجہ) (3 July 1952 – 23 August 2006) was a Pakistani schoolteacher, match referee, cricket coach and cricketer who played in 57 Test matches and 54 One Day Internationals for the Pakistan national cricket team from 1973 to 1985.

His younger brother, Ramiz Raja, also represented Pakistan in Tests and ODIs, becoming captain of the national side. Another younger, brother, Zaeem Raja, also played first-class cricket, as did his father, Raja Saleem Akhtar.

During his playing career, Raja was known primarily as a dashing middle-order left-handed batsman, with a characteristically generous backlift and breathtaking strokeplay combining a keen eye with wristy execution. Raja also bowled flat wrist spin with his right hand that was good enough to take 51 wickets in Tests, with his scalps including Clive Lloyd, Roy Fredericks, Glenn Turner and Viv Richards.

In all, he played in 250 first-class matches, scoring 11,434 runs at an average of 35.18, including 17 centuries, and taking 558 wickets at an average of 29.05.

== Early and personal life ==
Wasim Raja was born in Multan in the Punjab. His father, Raja Saleem Akhtar, was a high-ranking civil servant. Raja obtained a master's degree in political science from Government College, Lahore. He was captain of the Pakistan Under-19 side.

== Cricket career ==
=== Youth career ===
Raja made his first-class debut for Lahore Green at age 15 (1967) followed by inconsistent early batting tempered by useful bowling. His breakthrough came in the 1970–71 Pakistan U-19 Championship, captaining Lahore with standout all-round displays, 126 vs Sargodha (plus 2/44), six wickets and 70 vs Karachi in the West Zone final, and 5/85 and 4/29 in the final, earning selection as captain of a combined Pakistan U-19 side.

=== Domestic career ===
Raja's first-class century came in 1971–72: 151 for Punjab University in the Punjab Governor's Gold Cup final against Rawalpindi, complemented by seven wickets in an innings win. Subsequent scores of 80 and 57 versus a Pakistan XI and a standout all-round display for Pakistan Universities against Public Works Department in Dec 1972 (117 plus ten wickets) propelled him into the national side's New Zealand tour. He top-scored with 86 on tour debut for Pakistan against Canterbury and, after steady contributions, made his Test debut at the Basin Reserve in Feb 1973, scoring 10 and 41 in a drawn match.

=== International career ===
His finest hour in Test cricket was the tour to the West Indies in 1976–77, when he topped the Pakistani batting averages with 517 runs at 57.4 and came second in the bowling averages with 7 wickets at 18.7, behind Majid Khan. He also hit 14 sixes in the Test series, setting a record that has been equalled 4 times but still remains the only instance away from home. He top-scored in both innings of the drawn 1st Test in Barbados, to push the West Indies to within one wicket of their first loss at Kensington Oval since 1935. In their second innings, Pakistan were reduced to 158–9 by Andy Roberts and Colin Croft, a lead of only 144 just over halfway through the fourth day, but a last-wicket stand of 133 with Wasim Bari set the West Indies a target of 306. At the close of the fifth day, West Indies were 55 runs adrift, on 251–9. West Indies won their next 12 matches at Bridgetown, until they were finally beaten by England in the 4th Test in 1994.

== Playing style and legacy ==
Writing in December 2005, a few months before Raja's death, Gideon Haigh depicted him as a daring, unorthodox stroke-player whose six-hitting (a record 14 in a Test series, set in the Caribbean against Roberts, Garner and Croft, without a helmet) captured a sense that he played for the sheer pleasure of it. He is described as all eye and wrist, with a low, left-hand stance, a flamboyant backlift and footwork that followed his strokes, methods that delighted spectators but made selectors wary, contributing to intermittent omission. Haigh also emphasises Raja's striking looks and athletic grace, "one of the handsomest men to grace a cricket field", willowy in build with a mane of black hair later matched by a stylish beard, citing footage such as Lord's 1978 (Botham 8/34) to illustrate his bravura approach.

In his obituary, Saad Shafqat profiled Wasim Raja as a cult batting figure defined by a "relaxed attack" style, carefree demeanour, open-collared 1970s flair, and memorable off-side strokeplay, who valued entertainment as much as accumulation. Though his overall Test returns were modest (2,821 runs at 36.16, four hundreds), Shafqat highlights Raja's standout 1977 tour of the West Indies: 517 runs at 57.44, the series’ highest average, including an unbeaten 117 at Bridgetown and a match-saving 133-run tenth-wicket stand with Wasim Bari.

In a 2015 piece about cricket's "unfulfilled talent", Nadeem Paracha calls him "an Afridi before Afridi", citing Imran Khan’s view that Raja was perhaps the most naturally gifted batsman he played with but insufficiently serious about his gifts. The piece describes Raja's instinct to dominate from the outset and his dazzling left-handed strokeplay, high backlift powering fierce square-cuts, cover drives, pulls and hooks, contrasting his power with a lean, wiry build.

In 2015, Sankaran Krishna selects Wasim Raja at No. 6 in a composite India–Pakistan XI from the late-1970s/early-1980s, citing his swashbuckling left-hand batting, especially on the 1977 tour of the West Indies where he struck heavily and cleared the ropes often, along with electric fielding and useful spin that could turn matches.

== Post-retirement ==
He settled in London after marrying an Englishwoman, Ann. From 1989, Raja studied for a PGCE at Durham University, where he signed up for the cricket team. He had a spell teaching geography, mathematics and physical education at Caterham School in Surrey. He was a cricket teacher at Haslemere Preparatory School from 2004 to 2006. There is a memorial plaque there in his honour. He is also remembered in the northeast of England, playing for Durham CCC, before the county was awarded first-class status. He was also a coach for the Pakistan Under-19 team, and an International Cricket Council match referee in 15 Tests and 34 ODIs from 2002 to 2004.

He died of a heart attack in Marlow, Buckinghamshire, England, in August 2006 while playing cricket for the Surrey over-50s side. He is survived by his wife and their sons, Ali and Ahmad.

== Book ==
With Adam Licudi, Cornered Tigers: History of Pakistan’s Test Cricket from Abdul Kardar to Wasim Akram, 1997, 300 p.

== See also ==
- List of fatalities while playing cricket
