= Humayun Farkhan =

Pakistani cricketer

Personal information
- Born: 5 April 1947 (age 79); Lyallpur, British India
- Batting: Right-handed
- Bowling: Slow left-arm orthodox

Domestic team information
- Years: Team
- 1964-65 to 1977-78: Sargodha
- 1968-69 to 1969-70: Punjab University
- 1984-85 to 1985-86: Faisalabad

Career statistics
Competition	First-class
Matches	38
Runs scored	638
Batting average	13.02
100s/50s	0/1
Top score	52
Balls bowled	8682
Wickets	147
Bowling average	21.19
5 wickets in innings	9
10 wickets in match	1
Best bowling	6/23
Catches/stumpings	28/–
- Source: Cricinfo, 17 September 2014

Humayun Farkhan (born 4 April 1947) is a Pakistani former cricketer who played first-class cricket from 1964 to 1985.

A slow left-arm orthodox bowler, Farkhan made his first-class debut in the 1964-65 season, taking 5 for 60 for Sargodha against Combined Services. He played occasionally in the next few years, and took 6 for 204 for Sargodha when Lahore made 774 for 9 declared in the quarter-final of the Quaid-e-Azam Trophy in 1968-69. In 1970-71, captaining Sargodha against Peshawar, he scored 38 (second-highest score) and 36 (top score) and took 3 for 19 and 5 for 27 in a low-scoring match that Sargodha won by 94 runs. In 1974-75 he took 6 for 61 and 6 for 23 for Sargodha against Lahore B, but it was not enough to prevent a 114-run loss in a match in which 40 wickets fell for 406 runs.

He played no first-class cricket between the 1977-78 season and 1984–85, when Faisalabad, who had been unsuccessful in their initial first-class season in 1983-84, appointed him to captain the team in 1984-85. He led them to their first two victories that season and took 20 wickets himself at an average of 18.00. In his first match he led Faisalabad to their first victory, over Gujranwala, taking seven wickets. He led Faisalabad to three victories out of four matches in 1985-86, then retired from first-class cricket.

His brother, Sajjad Farkhan, also played first-class cricket for Sargodha and Faisalabad.
