= Ali Sawal =

Pakistani cricketer

Personal information
- Full name: Mohammad Ali Sawal
- Born: 24 October 1979 (age 47); Multan, Punjab, Pakistan
- Batting: Right-handed
- Bowling: Right-arm fast-medium

Domestic team information
- Years: Team
- 2000: Oxford University
- 2001/02: Sargodha

Career statistics
Competition	First-class	List A
Matches	4	5
Runs scored	23	137
Batting average	4.60	27.40
100s/50s	0/0	0/1
Top score	14	56
Balls bowled	365	130
Wickets	2	3
Bowling average	116.50	35.33
5 wickets in innings	0	0
10 wickets in match	0	0
Best bowling	2/96	2/16
Catches/stumpings	2/–	1/–
- Source: Cricinfo, 17 July 2020

Mohammad Ali Sawal (born 24 October 1979) is a Pakistani cricket commentator and former cricketer.

Sawal was born at Multan and later studied for his degree in England at Oxford Brookes University. While studying at Oxford Brookes, he made a single appearance in first-class cricket for an Oxford Universities team (a forerunner of Oxford UCCE which was founded in 2001) against Glamorgan at Oxford in 2000, taking the wickets of Alun Evans and Matthew Maynard in the match. After returning to Pakistan following the completion of his studies, Sawal played first-class cricket for Sargodha in the 2001/02 Quaid-e-Azam Trophy, making three appearances. He scored 21 runs in his three first-class matches for Sargodha. He also made five appearances for Sargodha in List A one-day cricket in the 2001/02 National One Day Championship. Sawal scored 137 runs in his five one-day matches, at an average of 27.40 and a high score of 56. With his right-arm fast-medium bowling, he took 3 wickets with best figures of 2 for 16.

Sawal later became a cricket commentator for PTV Sports, regularly appearing alongside former international cricketer Aamer Sohail.
