= Allied Bank Limited cricket team =

Cricket team

Allied Bank Limited cricket team were a first-class cricket side that competed in Pakistani domestic cricket from 1978–79 to 2004–05. They were sponsored by Allied Bank Limited.

They played 116 first-class matches, with 43 wins, 31 losses and 42 draws. They beat Pakistan International Airlines in the final of the Patron's Trophy in 1994–95.

The highest score for Allied Bank Limited was 300 by Ramiz Raja against Habib Bank Limited in 1994–95. The best innings bowling figures were 9 for 51 by Aaqib Javed against Habib Bank Limited in 1996–97.

== Honours ==
- Patron's Trophy (1)
- 1994–95

== See also ==
- List of Allied Bank Limited cricketers
