= Sargodha cricket team =

Cricket team

Sargodha cricket team was a first-class cricket team representing Sargodha Division in Punjab Province in Pakistan. They competed in Pakistan's first-class tournaments between 1961–62 and 2002–03.

== 1960s and 1970s ==
Sargodha played their inaugural first-class match in the Quaid-i-Azam Trophy in 1961–62, defeating Peshawar by an innings. Saleem Akhtar, who later captained Sargodha, took 2 for 7 and 5 for 34. They did not win again until their first match in 1969–70, when they beat Lahore A by five wickets, Sherandaz Khan taking 11 for 86. Draws in their next two group matches enabled Sargodha to progress to the Quaid-i-Azam Trophy semi-finals, where they were beaten by Public Works Department. Sargodha beat Peshawar again in 1970–71, the captain, Humayun Farkhan, scoring 38 (second-top score) and 36 (top score) and taking 3 for 19 and 5 for 27 in a low-scoring match.

They reached the semi-finals of the Punjab Tournament in 1973-74 and 1974–75, then in 1975-76 two first-innings leads were enough to get them into the final, but they lost to Lahore A. They had their second innings victory in the BCCP Patron's Trophy in 1975-76 when Jalal Akbar took 11 for 59 against Pakistan Air Force. They won again by an innings in the BCCP Patron's Trophy in 1977–78 against the short-lived team from the Pakistan Security Printing Corporation.

== 1980s to 2000s ==
In 1984-85 they won three of their four group matches in the BCCP Patron's Trophy and finished at the top of their group, but lost in the semi-final by 32 runs to Rawalpindi. The captain, Arshad Pervez, hit three centuries, two of them in the semi-final, and finished with 492 runs in the five matches at an average of 70.28, while Aziz-ur-Rehman, with 34 wickets at 15.35, was the leading wicket-taker in the competition.

They next reached the finals of a competition in 1992–93, when they played off in the final of the Quaid-i-Azam Trophy, losing to Karachi Whites by an innings. Akram Raza, with 43 wickets at 18.90, was the leading wicket-taker in the competition. However, Sargodha finished winless at the bottom of the table in 1994-95 and lost their first-class status for three seasons.

They returned to first-class competition in 1998–99, but struggled to win matches. In 2002-03 they won only one of their five group matches, but it was enough to enable them to participate in the pre-quarter-finals of the Quaid-i-Azam Trophy, where they beat Lahore Whites. They were unlucky in their quarter-final against Rawalpindi. In a match ruined by rain they made 365 for 3 declared, the captain, Mohammad Hafeez, scoring a century, and had Rawalpindi 170 for 4 when play ended and Rawalpindi were declared the winners on run-rate. It was Sargodha's last first-class match.

== Current status ==
Faisalabad is about 80 kilometres south-east of Sargodha, on the other side of the Chenab River, so when Sargodha were one of six regional teams that were absorbed by stronger teams for the 2003–04 season, they merged with Faisalabad, who then proceeded to win the Quaid-i-Azam Trophy that season for the first time. Since Sargodha lost first-class status they have continued to compete in the annual Inter-District Senior Tournament against other teams from the Faisalabad region.

== Playing record ==
Overall Sargodha played 163 matches in various first-class tournaments, winning 28, losing 56 and drawing 79. They also played 70 List A matches, winning 13 and losing 56, with one no-result.

Most of Sargodha's home matches were staged at the Sports Stadium in Sargodha, which is now used for some of Faisalabad's home matches. It is also still used by Sargodha senior and junior teams in sub-first-class competitions.

== Individual records ==
Sargodha's highest individual score was 394, by Naved Latif against Gujranwala in 2000–01. It was the tenth-highest score in the history of first-class cricket. Sargodha's total of 721 was their highest.

The best bowling figures were 8 for 25 by Naeem Khan in 1986–87. State Bank of Pakistan needed only 119 to win, but Khan bowled them out for 54. The best match figures were 13 for 78 (7 for 47 and 6 for 31) by Aziz-ur-Rehman in a 268-run victory over Karachi Whites in 1989–90.

== Other sources ==
- Wisden Cricketers' Almanack 1963 to 2005
