= Football on 5 =

- Also known as: Football on Five
- Presented by: Brough Scott (1997); Steve Scott (1997–2003); John Barnes (2003–2006); Colin Murray (2006–2010); Jim Rosenthal (2010–2012); George Riley (2015–2017); Kelly Cates (2015–2016); Lynsey Hipgrave (2016-2017); Colin Murray (2017-2018); Alex Aijoe (2025)
- Country of origin: United Kingdom

Original release
- Network: 5
- Release: May 1997 – July 2012
- Release: 8 August 2015 – 6 May 2018
- Release: 14 June 2025

Football on 5 is the principal football programme on 5 in the UK. The show first ran from May 1997 until July 2012. The show returned in August 2015 under the name Football League Tonight. The Football on 5 name was revived starting with the 2016–17 English Football League season.

== First match ==
Channel 5's first live football match was in May 1997, shortly after the channel launched. It was a 1998 World Cup qualifying match between Poland and England in Chorzów.

== International football ==
From 1997 to 2007, Channel 5 showed many away qualifying matches involving the home nations. England were shown playing in Poland (twice), Luxembourg, Bulgaria and Albania. In fact, the first game against Poland brought in the highest number of viewers the channel has ever seen to date. This was the high point of Football on 5's early coverage as they showed all the qualifying campaign for Euro 2000 for England but these qualifying matches have since transferred to the BBC and Sky Sports from 2001 to 2008, ITV from 2008 and Channel 4 in 2022 before switching back to ITV in 2024.

They also showed Scotland games which included their crucial final qualifier for 1998 FIFA World Cup at home to Latvia, plus trips to Lithuania, Faroe Islands, Czech Republic, Bosnia-Herzegovina, Estonia, Latvia, San Marino, Croatia and Belgium. They also showed the second leg of their Euro 2004 play-off with the Netherlands. These qualification matches were then shown on Sky Sports before moving to Premier Sports/Viaplay in 2022 and the BBC in 2025.

Many Ireland away matches were shown in qualification for the 2002 World Cup, these included the away matches against the Netherlands, Portugal, Cyprus, Andorra, and Estonia. This stopped in 2002, but was resumed with Ireland's away match in Israel in 2005. They showed the second leg of their Euro 2004 play-off with the Netherlands. These matches are now on Sky Sports.

Wales' Euro 2000 qualifiers away to Italy and Bulgaria were and they showed the first Wales football match at the Millennium Stadium against Brazil in 2000. They also covered a Northern Ireland's match in Moldova which was their only match on the network. These matches have since been shown on Sky Sports, Premier Sports/Viaplay and from 2025, the BBC.

Channel 5 won the terrestrial UK rights for the FIFA Confederations Cup in 2001, 2003 and 2005, showing a selection of matches including each final. Channel 5's coverage of the FIFA Confederations Cup ended after the 2005 tournament, as BBC Sport won the rights and covered the event on BBC Red Button or BBC Three.

== Scottish football ==
Between 2002 and 2004, they showed live matches from the Scottish League Cup, including the two finals; Rangers v Celtic in 2003 and Livingston v Hibs in 2004. Channel 5 usually showed one match per round usually on Thursday nights keeping with the tradition of UEFA Cup matches. Steve Scott was still the host at this time and Jonathan Pearce commentated. Channel 5 lost the rights to show Scottish League Cup matches after the 2003/04 season. From the 2004/05 season until 2015/16. The rights to the Scottish League Cup were held by BBC Scotland who would show a match per round and the final. The rights were then taken over by BT Sport from 2016/17 until 2019/20 and then the current rights holders Premier Sports/Viaplay in 2020/21

== Italian football ==
For the 2007–08 season, Channel 5 won the rights to broadcast a live Serie A game on Sunday afternoons, presented by Radio 1 DJ Mark Chapman and Laura Esposto. Games were also shown on sister channel Fiver and a highlights show was broadcast on Saturday afterwards, named Football Italiano. Channel 5 announced in July 2008 that they would not be continuing to cover Italian football for the 2008–09 season. These rights have since transferred to ESPN UK and BT Sport.

Chapman maintained a relationship with Channel 5 when he hosted a UEFA Cup match in 2008 between Portsmouth and Milan and deputised for Colin Murray whenever he was unavailable. His ties ended when, in 2009, Chapman presented Match of the Day for the first time (with ex-Northern Ireland manager Lawrie Sanchez and Martin Keown) in a friendly International between Northern Ireland and Italy in Pisa, which Italy won 3–0. He has since been seen deputising on Final Score on the BBC whenever Gabby Logan has been unavailable or due to her covering other sports.

== Friendly matches ==
Channel 5 covered pre-season friendly games and have done since 1998. Two games from Liverpool's pre season tour were shown in July 2008 with Channel 5's UEFA Europa League at the helm. Occasional charity games, such as those featuring a team of England Legends, were shown on Channel 5. They showed The Carlberg Belfast Challenge in 1998, which Liverpool were in, The Gelderland Tournament the same year with Chelsea and Dennis Bergkamp's testimonial and anything else they could grab in the early days.

== European club football ==
The backbone of Channel 5's football coverage consisted of UEFA Europa League matches, which it had shown throughout its existence, and The UEFA Cup. This was Channel 5's longest running football commitment showing matches from this every season since 1997–98 starting with Arsenal back in 1997 until the end of the 2011–12 season. They showed Aston Villa and Rangers a lot in the early days but would only cover the tournament to a point as BBC or ITV would usually have the rights from the quarter-finals onwards. Usually Channel 5 showed matches on an ad hoc basis covering sometimes three games in a day from early afternoon to late evening if there were many British clubs playing. For the three seasons starting in 2009–10 season, Channel 5 was the UK's lead network for Europa League coverage, winning rights to first choice matches in every round and exclusive coverage of the final. They previously held second choice matches and had no final coverage. Matches not covered by Channel 5 were shown on ITV4 or ESPN UK. When they became the main broadcaster they just picked one match usually at 8pm on a Thursday night.

Channel 5 showed three Europa League Finals as first choice broadcaster, before losing the rights to ITV Sport;

- 2010: Fulham 1–2 Atlético Madrid
- 2011: Porto 1–0 Braga
- 2012: Atlético Madrid 3–0 Athletic Bilbao

In the early days, Channel 5 had matches involving Chelsea and Newcastle United in the last two seasons of the now-defunct UEFA Cup Winners' Cup. They showed the Cup Winners' Cup in the early days of Channel 5, they showed virtually every Chelsea match in 1997–98 and 1998–99 and also Newcastle when they were in it in 1998

At the start of the 21st century, Channel 5 would occasionally cover Champions League qualifiers involving British teams. They showed qualifiers of Newcastle in 1997, Liverpool in 2001 and 2004 and Manchester United in 2005.

Channel 5 also occasionally covered the UEFA Intertoto Cup during its existence, including Aston Villa in 2000 and Newcastle in 2001.

They showed the FIFA World Club Cup in 2008, which Manchester United won, with commentary by Dave Woods and Stan Collymore with the usual UEFA Cup team presenting.

== End of Football on 5 (2012) ==
Football on Five was Channel 5's longest-running non-news programme, airing from 1997 to 2012. However, Channel 5 lost the contract for the Europa League to ITV Sport. Channel 5's last live Europa League Match was the final between Atletico Madrid and Atletico Bilbao in May 2012 and their last live match was in July 2012 when they had pre-season friendly coverage between Southampton and Ajax on 28 July (Jim Rosenthal presented alongside Ken Monkou, with Dave Woods and Stewart Robson commentating and Dave Beckett reporting).

== First revival (2015-2018) ==
Football on 5 had been off air for three years when in May 2015 Channel 5 won the rights to broadcast Football League highlights from the 2015–16 in a three-year deal, in a new programme called Football League Tonight, taking the coverage away from the BBC after six seasons. The highlights show is broadcast at 9pm, typically an hour and a half before Match of the Day is broadcast on BBC One, much earlier than when the BBC used to show The Football League Show which followed Match of the Day and usually started at 11:45pm. The promise of a mid-evening broadcast slot was believed to have been the tide turner, also in the contract were the highlights of the Football League Trophy. Channel 5 revived the Football on 5 banner, prefixing the Football League Tonight name. The format of the show changed midway through the 2015–16 season and split into two segments, called Football on 5: The Championship and Football on 5: Goal Rush. Together, they are broadcast from 9pm to 10:30pm on a Saturday, with a repeat on Sunday morning.

The show was presented by George Riley and Kelly Cates for its maiden season, followed by George Riley and Lindsay Hipgrave for the 2nd season and Colin Murray from 2017 to 2018 season, Colin previously presented all of Channel 5 UEFA Cup, Europa League and other football coverage from 2006 to 2010 leaving to join the BBC and host Match of the Day 2.

Quest acquired the rights after the end of the 2017/18 season, signing a four-year contract, ending the run of three years for Channel 5.

== Second revival (2025) ==
5 teamed up with streaming service DAZN to air 23 matches from the FIFA Club World Cup in the United States from June 14 to July 13, 2025.

It then aired 2 of Club World Cup winners Chelsea's home preseason matches against Bayer Leverkusen and AC Milan, and both legs of Crystal Palace's UEFA Conference League playoff against Norwegian side Fredrikstad FK.

There is potential for UEFA Champions League as early as the 2027 final after its parent Paramount Skydance acquired Warner Bros. Discovery (WBD) in October 2026 to form Skydance, making 5 a sibling to WBD and BT's TNT Sports networks. Skydance holds both United States (CBS Sports) and United Kingdom (TNT Sports UK 2026-27, afterwards Paramount+) rights to the UEFA Champions League.

== Presenters ==
Channel 5's football coverage has had a number of presenters over the years. Brough Scott famously presented their first big match - famously remembered due to the sports bar set-up and the inclusion of fellow Channel 5 personalities, including the cast of Family Affairs. After that it was Jeremy Nicholas for a short period until ITV News presenter Steve Scott, brother of ITV Sport anchor Angus Scott took over as host until 2004, when he was replaced by John Barnes. In 2006, Barnes moved to a roving reporter and co-commentator role. Whenever Barnes was unavailable when he was the host Sky's NFL presenter Nick Halling would deputise.

Broadcaster and football enthusiast Colin Murray took over the reins as he already appeared on Channel 5 hosting live NFL. In 2007, his BBC Radio 1 colleague at the time, Mark Chapman joined Channel 5 to cover Italian football alongside Laura Esposto. In 2010, Colin Murray left Channel 5 after the final of the Europa League in which Fulham were beaten 2–1 by Atlético Madrid, to become a full-time host with BBC Sport to host Match of the Day 2 and BDO Darts. Mark Chapman only appeared once more on Channel 5 after the end of Football Italiano covering for Colin Murray and with Laura Esposito now presenting in Italy, Channel 5 needed a new host and Jim Rosenthal was appointed to host live Europa League matches, hosting a live match every round up to the final from 2010 to 2012. Kelly Cates and George Riley from BBC Radio 5 Live have joined the show as the new presenters for the new Football League Highlights Show. Kelly Cates has worked for ESPN UK, ITV Sport, Talksport and BBC Radio 5 Live covering football from Premier League to the World Cup. George Riley has presented Rugby League and reported and commentated on football, snooker and darts for BBC Sport and BBC Radio 5 Live.

== Commentators ==
Channel 5's first main commentator was Capital Gold and BBC Radio 5 Live broadcaster Jonathan Pearce. Pearce hosted an array of football from UEFA Cup, Confederations Cup, Internationals to Scottish Football. Pearce left in Summer 2004 to join the Match of the Day team. John Helm was then the main commentator and filled the role left by Pearce, with other commentaries coming from Gary Bloom, Tony Jones and Jon Champion. In 2007 Dave Woods and commentated on nearly every UEFA Cup and Europa League match from 2007 to 2012, when he was unavailable Steve Bower deputised. Paul Walker is the main commentator for Football League & League Cup highlights although Sky Sports Football League Commentators are used as well on matches that were previously shown live on Sky. Dave Farrar has also commentated, mostly in the EFL Cup.

== Pundits ==
Channel 5's regular pundits consisted of Pat Nevin who, from 2009, moved to pitchside before games and in the OB truck at half and full-time; Phil Thompson, who commentated on the first ever Football on 5 match between Poland and England with Jonathan Pearce; Stan Collymore who replaced John Barnes from 2010 to 2012 and was in the studio alongside Jim Rosenthal, and Graham Taylor who is the principal co-commentator. When needed, guests are used as pundits such as Kevin Ratcliffe. Channel 5 has also used other pundits and commentators when needed, such as Ray Houghton, Terry Butcher, Joe Royle, Phil Babb, Stewart Robson and John Scales.

Uniquely, John Barnes has appeared in every major role for the show: firstly, he hosted the programme then, when Murray was appointed host, Barnes appeared as a co-commentator. He also appeared as a pitchside analyst speaking to resident reporter Dave Beckett, giving his thoughts on the action during the match, at half time and at full-time, and conducting post-match interviews. Barnes left after he became manager of Tranmere Rovers and was replaced by Collymore. He was sacked as manager after a poor run of results, but has never returned to Channel 5 but has since appeared on ESPN UK as a pundit. Channel 5 use a variety of pundits for Football League & League Cup programming however Alan Curbishley, Chris Iwelumo, Clinton Morrison, Michael Gray and Adam Virgo all feature regularly. More pundits have included Kevin Davies, David James and Francis Benali. As for co-commentators, recently the likes of Nigel Spackman, Phil Brown, Owen Hargreaves (co-commentator and pundit) and John Hartson have appeared on their League Cup coverage.

For the network's upcoming UEFA Champions League coverage part of the joint US-UK broadcast by Skydance, the CBS Sports UEFA Champions League studio crew, which is based in London and part of Skydance, is expected to lead the joint broadcast. Kate Scott, Thierry Henry, Peter Schmeichel, and Jamie Carragher serve as the Skydance Sports crew.

== Reporters ==
Football League coverage on Channel 5 has numerous reporters at each game. Tom Skippings is the main reporter for most programmes. Two other notable reporters are Nick Halling and Sue Thearle - both taken from the BBC. Jack Woodward, Dan Mason, Dave Beckett and John Anderson all also feature semi-regularly. For the 2016/17 season, Channel 5 used 22 reporters during the course of the season, as well as those mentioned. Oliver Wilson, Will Cope, Dan O'Hagan, Alex Gordon-Martin, Faye Carruthers, Chris Maughan, Mick Conway, Jonathan Beck, Steve Lee, Andy Hodgson, Jonathan Legard, Simon Watts, Callum Williams, Chris Wise and Tony Colliver have all appeared during the 2016/17 season.
