= Football League Tonight =

- Presented by: Kelly Cates (2015–16); George Riley (2015–17); Lynsey Hipgrave (2016–17); Colin Murray (2017–2018)
- Country of origin: United Kingdom
- No. of series: 3
- No. of episodes: 42

Production
- Running time: Various
- Production company: Sunset + Vine Productions

Original release
- Network: Channel 5
- Release: 8 August 2015 – 6 May 2018

Related
- The Football League Show (BBC One); EFL on Quest (Quest)

Football League Tonight was a football highlights programme on Channel 5 in the United Kingdom. The show covered the English Football League and its cup competitions; the EFL Cup and the EFL Trophy. It was replaced for the 2018–19 season by EFL on Quest.

The show was sponsored by Sky Bet (also sponsors of the Football League), Ginsters and Evans Halshaw.

== Background ==
Channel 5 regularly covered football from its launch in 1997, including the Scottish League Cup, Serie A, the UEFA Europa League and international football, but Football on 5 had been off air for three years after losing the rights to the Europa League. In May 2015 Channel 5 won the rights to broadcast highlights for the Football League and the Football League Cup from the 2015–16 in a three-year deal. The contract succeeded the BBC's six-year coverage of the league with The Football League Show and gave Channel 5 their first foray into English domestic league football. The highlights show was agreed to be broadcast at 9 pm, around an hour and a half before the typical Match of the Day slot; previously the BBC had shown The Football League Show after Match of the Day.

== Format ==
Initially, the show was named Football League Tonight and its format was largely similar to its BBC predecessor, The Football League Show. However, early episodes featured a studio audience and match highlights from one division were not shown together. The live audience was scrapped midway through the first season and the show soon reverted to showing highlights from the Championship, followed by League One and finishing with League Two. The title was later changed to "Football on 5".

League Cup highlights were originally shown under the name Capital One Cup Tonight, taking the name of the title sponsor of the competition. For 2016–17, the programme followed suit of its counterpart, becoming Football on 5: The EFL Cup.

== Presenters and pundits ==
For the 2015–16 season, George Riley and Kelly Cates from BBC Radio 5 Live were chosen to be the presenters of the show. Cates had also worked on football coverage for ITV Sport, ESPN and Talksport, whilst Riley has worked for BBC TV and radio on coverage of rugby league, football, darts and snooker. Both hosted coverage of the Football League, with Cates presenting League Cup highlights alone. Lynsey Hipgrave from BBC Radio 5 Live's Danny Baker Show and BT Sport replaced Cates the following season.

A number of commentators were used for the programme, the main one being Paul Walker, who produces commentary for the Pitch International World Feed, who also worked for the BBC on The Football League Show. Other commentators included Dave Farrar, Martin Fisher and John Roder. Channel 5 also used Sky Sports commentators for their match highlight coverage such as Bill Leslie, Daniel Mann and Gary Weaver. Match reporters included Dave Beckett, Sue Thearle, Richard Henwood, Nick Halling, Dan Mason, Dan O'Hagan, Tom Skippings, Chris Ford and Matt Williams.

The show had a mixture of former players and managers as pundits; Adam Virgo was the most frequent pundit having appeared on both Cup and League highlights shows. Other pundits that appeared on the show were Michael Gray, Mark Bright, Gus Poyet, Alex McLeish, Jamie Cureton, Clinton Morrison, Chris Iwelumo and Karl Robinson.

On 22 July 2017, it was reported that break clauses had been activated in Riley and Hipgrave's contracts and they would be replaced by Colin Murray for the 2017–18 season.

== Reception ==
Channel 5 reportedly failed to bring in enough viewers, and therefore decided not to renew the contract with the EFL. Some had been critical of the broadcaster's coverage of the EFL.
