= EFL on Quest =

Football highlight programme on Quest channel

- Genre: Football Highlights
- Country of origin: United Kingdom
- Original language: English
- No. of series: 4

Production
- Running time: 120 minutes
- Production companies: IMG; ITN Productions

Original release
- Network: Quest
- Release: 4 August 2018 – 29 May 2022

Related
- Football League Tonight (Channel 5); EFL Highlights (ITV4)

EFL on Quest is a football highlights programme on the Quest channel in the United Kingdom. The programme covered the English Football League, taking over from Channel 5's Football League Tonight in August 2018. It aired until it was replaced by ITV's EFL Highlights in August 2022.

== History ==
Starting from the 2018–19 season, the four-year deal saw Quest provide 90 minutes of extensive match highlights of the English Championship, League One and League Two, hosted by Colin Murray, in primetime at 9pm every Saturday night. As a result, the channel announced a HD version would launch in July 2018. It launched on 21 July 2018 on Virgin Media channel 217 but was removed on 24 July 2018. It officially launched on 2 August 2018 on Virgin Media, on 3 August on Freesat and Sky, and on 14 August on Freeview. A duplicate version was also added to Virgin Media from 22 July 2018 to 11 August 2018 on channel 194 as a replacement for Dave HD following the UKTV channels' removals.

The EFL said in its news release on 4 May 2018 that "the partnership between the EFL and Quest will guarantee accessible high quality, free-to-air coverage for football fans across the country". When the first programme was broadcast on 4 August 2018, viewers experienced frequent breakup of picture and the screen aspect was reduced to the obsolete 4:3 ratio. Numerous complaints were made and Digital Spy ran a feature on the impact of the "technical difficulties". Quest claimed that "some" viewers experienced problems but the Digital Spy investigation strongly suggests that everyone was impacted. Quest added that they were working to resolve the issue.

Starting on 30 March 2019, the programme was extended to two hours, with increased coverage of League One and League Two and with a second pundit added.

On 23 February 2022, the EFL announced that they had awarded ITV the rights for EFL Highlights from the start of the 2022–23 season, thus meaning that the show came to an end at the end of the season following the conclusion of Quest's contract. The last episode aired on 29 May 2022, and the HD version of Quest was subsequently shut down on Freeview a month later.

== Presenters and pundits ==
The programme was usually presented by former BBC and Channel 5 presenter Colin Murray, although on certain weekends the show was presented by Jacqui Oatley or Michelle Owen.

Alongside the presenter were two of a number of pundits, including Ian Holloway, Dean Ashton, Stephen Warnock, Michael Brown, Sue Smith, Curtis Davies, Sam Parkin, Ali Maxwell, George Elek, Michael Appleton and Gary McSheffrey. Sometimes guest pundits such as EFL managers were also present.

Commentary came from the Pitch International world feed commentators, such as Paul Walker, Nigel Adderley, Kevin Keatings, Dan Mason, Jon Champion, Steve Wilson, Dan O'Hagan, John Roder, Chris Sharples, Dave Farrar, Joe Speight, James Fielden, Jon Driscoll, Martin Fisher and Sam Matterface. QUEST also used their own commentators on certain games, such as Simon Watts, Jonathan Legard, Andy Clarke, and world feed regulars such as Paul Walker, Dan Mason, Chris Sharples and Dan O'Hagan.

The programme had largely the same reporters as the BBC's The Football League Show and Channel 5's Football League Tonight - regulars included the likes of Sue Thearle, Chris Ford, Georgie Bingham, Dave Beckett, Matt Williams, Nick Halling, Jack Woodward, Tom Skippings, Jonathan Legard, Danny Jamieson, Ollie Wilson, Alison Bender, Will Cope and Tim Long.
