= Kelly Cates =

British television presenter

- Born: Kelly Dalglish; September 1975 (age 51); Glasgow, Scotland
- Occupation: Broadcaster
- Spouse: Tom Cates (m. 2007; sep. 2021)
- Children: 2
- Parent(s): Kenny Dalglish; Marina Dalglish
- Relatives: Paul Dalglish (brother)

Kelly Cates (née Dalglish; born September 1975) is a British sports broadcaster who has worked for Sky Sports, BBC Sport and ESPN.

== Early life ==
Cates was born in Glasgow in 1975, the eldest of four children of former Celtic and Liverpool player and manager Kenny Dalglish and Marina. Her brother, Paul Dalglish, also had a professional football career. She has two younger sisters. The family grew up in Southport.

She was two years into a mathematics degree at the University of Glasgow when she left in 1998 to accept an offer at the nascent Sky Sports News.

== Career ==
=== Television ===
Cates and Mike Wedderburn were the first-ever presenters on Sky Sports News, launching the channel on 10 August 1998. Around the same time, she presented the news segment on The Biggest Breakfast Ever, the eight-hour Millennium special of The Big Breakfast, and was part of the presenter lineup for Virgin Media's new portal.

In 2007, Cates interviewed managers and players as part of Setanta Sports' Premier League coverage, and presented Setanta Sports News. During the 2009–10 football season, she joined the ESPN team for its Premier League coverage, co-presenting Talk of the Terrace alongside Mark Chapman and later Nat Coombs. In May 2010, she covered sports news on GMTV in the absence of regular host Dan Lobb, before working as a reporter for ITV at the 2010 FIFA World Cup in South Africa and subsequently for the 2011–12 UEFA Champions League.

In 2012, Cates presented sports news on Daybreak in the absence of Gavin Ramjaun, and was part of the Channel 4 presenting team for the London 2012 Paralympics. That autumn, she also presented the six-part Scottish television series Coached Off the Couch for STV.

From the 2015–16 season, Cates hosted Football League Tonight on Channel 5 with George Riley, presenting weekly highlights from the English Football League. She rejoined Sky Sports in August 2016 to present its live Football League coverage, before switching from the EFL in August 2017 to host Premier League matches. In 2020, she returned to ESPN part-time to cover Euro 2020.

In January 2025, Cates was confirmed as one of three co-hosts of the BBC's Saturday evening highlights show Match of the Day, alongside Gabby Logan and Mark Chapman, succeeding Gary Lineker.

=== Radio ===
Cates has been a regular presenter on national radio station Talksport, hosting the Monday evening talk show between 7:00 and 10:00 alongside Jason Cundy. She has also presented Fighting Talk on BBC Radio 5 Live, standing in for Colin Murray, and presented on the station during the summer of 2009. From August 2013 until 2018, she presented the Sunday edition of 606 alongside pundit Ian Wright, and has presented the midweek sports show 5 Live Sport, predominantly on Tuesdays. She has also covered two FIFA World Cups for 5 Live.

== Personal life ==
She married Tom Cates, a television producer, in 2007 at St Margaret's, Newlands, Glasgow; the couple separated in 2021. They have two daughters, and, as of 2026, she resides in Chiswick, West London. She often works at MediaCity in Manchester. In October 2026, The Daily Telegraph reported that Cates and fellow presenter Mark Chapman had been dating for several months.

Her sister, Lynsey, married former Wales International rugby player Nicky Robinson in 2018.
