= EFL Highlights =

Football highlight programme on ITV channel

- logo
- Genre: Football Highlights
- Country of origin: United Kingdom
- Original language: English

Production
- Running time: 60–90 minutes
- Production company: ITV Digital Channels

Original release
- Network: ITV4
- Release: 30 July 2022 – present

Related
- EFL on Quest (Quest); Football League Extra (ITV) The Championship (ITV)

EFL Highlights is a football highlights programme on ITV4 in the United Kingdom. The programme covers the English Football League.

Replacing EFL on Quest which had been broadcast on the Quest channel. Its launch marked a return for football highlights to terrestrial television and a return to ITV after thirteen years.

ITV signed a two-year deal which also includes highlights from the EFL Cup and EFL Trophy.

Hugh Woozencroft and Jules Breach were announced as the presenters in June 2022.

The programme has also shown work of clubs in the community, with features hosted by a variety of reporters, including Aaron Paul and Nick Ransom.

The show airs on Saturday evening at 9pm on ITV4, with subsequent repeats on Saturday night and Sunday morning on ITV, and availability on demand on ITVX.

ITV previously aired Football League Extra between August 1994 and May 2004 and The Championship between August 2004 and May 2009.
