= Fishing in the Footsteps of Mr. Crabtree =

2013 television series

Fishing in the Footsteps of Mr. Crabtree is a television series on Quest, first airing in January 2013. It is based on the 1940s comic strip Mr. Crabtree goes Fishing, by Bernard Venables.

== Background ==
Mr. Crabtree Goes Fishing, created by Bernard Venables, was originally published in The Mirror newspaper in the 1940s. It is the comic strip story of a father who takes his son Peter on a series of angling adventures over the course of a year catching species such as chub, pike, carp, roach, tench and trout, on rivers and lakes. In 1949 the first Mr. Crabtree book was published. Mr. Crabtree Goes Fishing has sold around four million copies to date.

Bernard Venables was an artist, angler, journalist and author. He co-founded the Angling Times in 1953, was founder editor of Creel magazine in 1963, and wrote over 20 books. He was an early environmentalist and his love of the natural world inspired many of today's British anglers, and he is remembered as one of the great and influential anglers of the 20th Century.

== TV series ==
In 2013 ‘Fishing in the Footsteps of Mr. Crabtree’, the TV series, was produced by Toast Entertainment Group for Mr. Crabtree Ltd. It was aired in the UK on Quest during January and February 2013.

This first series saw presenter John Bailey, an internationally renowned fishing guide, fishing and walking in the footsteps of his angling hero, Mr. Crabtree, taking a different young guest fishing each week.

=== Series 1 (2013) ===
No.	Title	Original release date
1	"Tench"	TBA
John Bailey fishes with 12-year-old Sam from the West Midlands, fishing predominantly for tench using classic and contemporary methods.
2	"Rivers"	TBA
12-year-old Tadhg from Oxford accompanies John to the riverbank for a series of lessons in watercraft and the signs of a healthy waterway. The companions visit many stretches over their two days together, comparing urban and rural waters, discussing the evolution of a river and the positive impact of angling as a community builder.
3	"Lakes"	TBA
Henry from Devon and John fish numerous lakes, deploying different methods and tactics depending on the environment and enjoying the natural world as they fish for all species.
4	"Carp"	TBA
10-year-old Michael from Coventry wants to catch carp. John visits his friend and contemporary carp angler Alan Blair to talk about modern methods and to gauge where to start with Michael.
5	"Barbel"	TBA
Jaynie, 14 and Claragh, 12 from Glasgow visited the Wye with John to fish for barbel.
5	"Pike"	TBA
14-year-old James from Wales fishes with John for pike in rivers, lakes and weir pools.
