= List of former English Football League clubs =

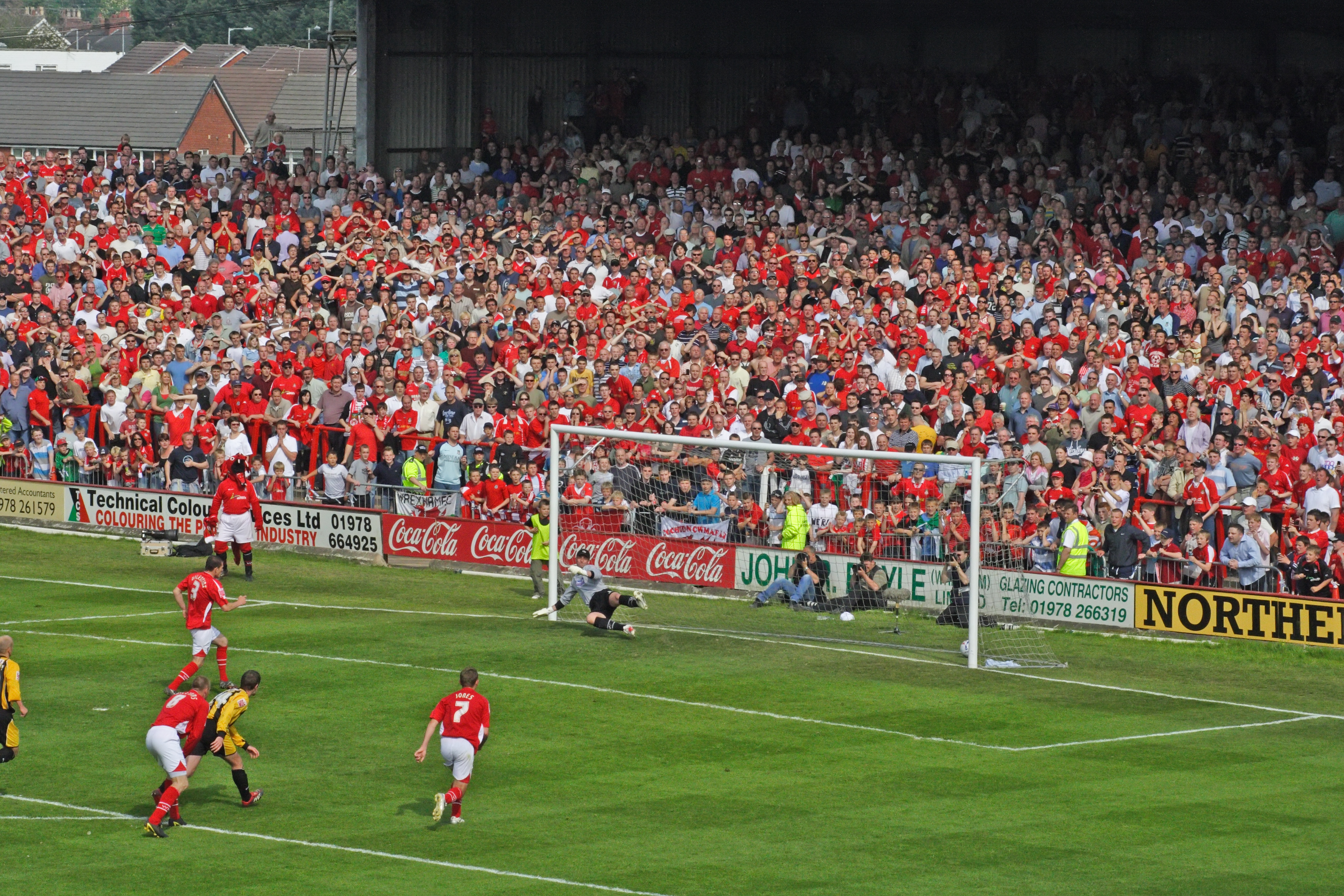
Boston United were relegated from the League after a 3–1 defeat to Wrexham on the final day of the 2006–07 season, ending a five-year spell in the League. Wrexham were relegated in 2008, ending an 87-year spell.

The former member clubs of the English Football League are football clubs that lost their status in the League by resigning, or by relegation, by becoming defunct, merging with another club, or expulsion. Clubs presently playing in the Premier League are also included in this article.

The English Football League comprises professional clubs from England and Wales, and was established in 1888 as The Football League (First Division). In 1892, the Second Division was formed. A Third Division was introduced in 1920, before being regionalised as North and South. In 1958 these became the national Third and Fourth Division. The Premier League superseded the First Division as the top-flight of the English football league system in 1992, with the other three divisions renamed the First, Second and Third Divisions. They were rebranded again in 2004 as the Championship, League One and League Two.

Until 1986, clubs could lose their League status by failing to gain re-election after finishing in the bottom four of the bottom division (fourth tier). From the 1986–87 season, the club finishing bottom was relegated to the Conference National (now National League), the highest level of non-League football, depending on the ability of the Conference champions to meet FA requirements. Since 2002–03, the bottom two clubs of League Two face relegation to the National League.

== Clubs ==
The tables show the first and last seasons in which each club competed in the League. Some clubs' membership was intermittent between their first and last seasons.

=== Current members of Level 1: The Premier League (2026–27) ===
Club	First League season	Last League season	Ref(s)
Arsenal	1893–94	1991–92	
**Aston Villa**	1888–89	2018–19	
Bournemouth	1923–24	2021–22	
Brentford	1920–21	2020–21	
Brighton & Hove Albion	1920–21	2016–17	
Chelsea	1905–06	1991–92	
Coventry City	1919–20	2025–26	
Crystal Palace	1920–21	2012–13	
**Everton**	1888–89	1991–92	
Fulham	1907–08	2021–22	
Hull City	1905–06	2025–26	
Ipswich Town	1938–39	2025–26	
Leeds United	1920–21	2024–25	
Liverpool	1893–94	1991–92	
Manchester City	1892–93	2001–02	
Manchester United	1892–93	1991–92	
Newcastle United	1893–94	2016–17	
Nottingham Forest	1892–93	2021–22	
Sunderland	1890–91	2024–25	
Tottenham Hotspur	1908–09	1991–92	

=== Former member clubs (no longer at English football levels 1–4) ===
Clubs shown in bold were among the founder members of the League. As of 2026, the founder member clubs playing in the League are Blackburn Rovers, Bolton Wanderers, Burnley, Derby County, Notts County, Preston North End, Stoke City, West Bromwich Albion, and Wolverhampton Wanderers. Preston have continuously been League members, whereas the others (except Notts County) have played in the Premier League at one time or another. Notts County has recently returned to the League after four seasons in the National League.

Four former members of the old Football League Division One no longer play in the Football League or Premier League: Bury, Bradford Park Avenue, Darwen, and Glossop North End.

Where a defunct club has been succeeded by a phoenix club, the new club is mentioned.

Defunct club

Club	First League season	Last League season	Reason	Current status	Ref(s)
(Wales) Aberdare Athletic	1921–22	1926–27	Not re-elected	Merged with Aberaman as Aberdare and Aberaman, later Aberaman Town and now Aberdare Town in the Aberdare Valley League	
**Accrington**	1888–89	1892–93	Resigned	Defunct	
Accrington Stanley (1891)	1921–22	1961–62	Resigned	Defunct, but a new Accrington Stanley formed in 1968 and are playing in EFL League Two	
Aldershot	1932–33	1991–92 (Note: Aldershot resigned during the 1991–92 season and the club's record was expunged from the table.)	Liquidated	Defunct, Aldershot Town later formed and are playing in the National League	
Aldershot Town	2008–09	2012–13	Relegated	Playing in the National League	
Ashington	1921–22	1928–29	Not re-elected	Playing in the Northern Premier League Division One East	
Barrow	1921–22	1971–72	Not re-elected	Playing in the National League	
Barrow	2020–21	2025–26	Relegated	Playing in the National League	
Bootle	1892–93	1892–93	Resigned	Defunct. A new club, formed as Langton in 1953, changed name to Bootle in 1973, and now playing in the Northern Premier League Division One West	
Boston United	2002–03	2006–07	Relegated	Playing in the National League	
Bradford Park Avenue	1908–09	1969–70	Not re-elected	Defunct, revived version of the club playing in the Northern Premier League Division One East	
Burton Swifts	1892–93	1900–01	Merged with Burton Wanderers to form Burton United	Defunct, a successor club formed in 1950 Burton Albion F.C. plays in EFL League One	
Burton United	1901–02	1906–07	Not re-elected	Defunct, a successor club formed in 1950 Burton Albion F.C. plays in EFL League One	
Burton Wanderers	1894–95	1896–97	Not re-elected; later merged with Burton Swifts to form Burton United	Defunct, a successor club formed in 1950 Burton Albion F.C. plays in EFL League One	
Bury	1894–95	2018–19	Expelled; later merged with successor club, Bury A.F.C.	Expelled during the 2019–20 season without playing a match, due to inability to pay liabilities. Playing in the Northern Premier League Premier Division	
Carlisle United	1928–29	2024–25	Relegated	Playing in the National League	
Chester City	1931–32	2008–09	Relegated	Defunct, successor club Chester playing in the National League North	
Dagenham & Redbridge	2007–08	2015–16	Relegated	Playing in the National League South	
Darlington	1921–22	2009–10	Relegated	Defunct, revived version of the club playing in the National League North	
Darwen	1891–92	1898–99	Resigned	Defunct, AFC Darwen later formed and are playing in the North West Counties League Division One North	
Durham City	1921–22	1927–28	Not re-elected	Defunct. Revived club playing in the Wearside League Division One	
Forest Green Rovers	2017–18	2023–24	Relegated	Playing in the National League	
Gainsborough Trinity	1896–97	1911–12	Not re-elected	Playing in the Northern Premier League Premier Division	
Gateshead	1919–20	1959–60	Not re-elected	Defunct. New Gateshead (National League) and South Shields (National League North) clubs formed	
Glossop	1898–99	1914–15	Not re-elected	Playing in the North West Counties League Premier Division	
Halifax Town	1921–22	2001–02	Relegated	Defunct, FC Halifax Town later formed and are playing in the National League	
Harrogate Town	2020–21	2025–26	Relegated	Playing in the National League	
Hartlepool United	1921–22	2022–23	Relegated	Playing in the National League	
Hereford United	1972–73	2011–12	Relegated	Defunct, successor club Hereford playing in the National League North	
Kidderminster Harriers	2000–01	2004–05	Relegated	Playing in the National League	
Leeds City	1905–06	1919–20 (Note: Leeds City were expelled and forcibly wound up by the FA during the 1919–20 season and the club's place, record and remaining fixtures in the league were assumed by Port Vale.)	Expelled	Defunct, successor club Leeds United playing in the Premier League	
Loughborough	1895–96	1899–1900	Not re-elected	Defunct	
Macclesfield Town	1997–98	2019–20	Relegated	Defunct, successor club Macclesfield playing in the National League North	
Maidstone United	1989–90	1991–92 (Note: Maidstone United were included in the fixtures for the 1992–93 season but folded and resigned after postponing their first match.)	Liquidated	Defunct, revived version of the club playing in the National League South	
(Wales) Merthyr Town	1920–21	1929–30	Not re-elected	Defunct, revived version playing in National League North	
Middlesbrough Ironopolis	1893–94	1893–94	Resigned	Defunct	
Morecambe	2007–08	2024–25	Relegated	Playing in the National League North	
Nelson	1921–22	1930–31	Not re-elected	Defunct, revived version playing in the North West Counties League Premier Division	
New Brighton	1923–24	1950–51	Not re-elected	Defunct	
New Brighton Tower	1898–99	1900–01	Liquidated	Defunct	
(Wales) Newport County	1920–21	1987–88	Relegated	Defunct, revived version of the club playing in EFL League Two	
Northwich Victoria	1892–93	1893–94	Resigned	Playing in the Midland League Premier Division	
Rotherham County	1919–20	1924–25	Merged with Rotherham Town (1899) to form Rotherham United	Defunct, Rotherham United playing in the EFL League Two	
Rotherham Town	1893–94	1895–96	Resigned	Defunct, Rotherham United playing in the EFL League Two	
Rushden & Diamonds	2001–02	2005–06	Relegated	Defunct, AFC Rushden & Diamonds playing in the Northern Premier League Division One Midlands	
Scarborough	1987–88	1998–99	Relegated	Defunct, Scarborough Athletic later formed and are playing in the National League North	
Scunthorpe United	1950–51	2021–22	Relegated	Playing in the National League	
Southend United	1920–21	2020–21	Relegated	Playing in the National League	
Southport	1921–22	1977–78	Not re-elected	Playing in the National League North	
Stalybridge Celtic	1921–22	1922–23	Resigned	Playing in the Northern Premier League Division One West	
Sutton United	2021–22	2023–24	Relegated	Playing in the National League	
Thames	1930–31	1931–32	Resigned	Defunct	
Torquay United	1927–28	2013–14	Relegated	Playing in the National League South	
Wigan Borough	1921–22	1930–31	Resigned midway through season	Defunct, successor club Wigan Athletic playing in EFL League One	
Wimbledon	1977–78	2003–04	Relocated and became Milton Keynes Dons.	Became Milton Keynes Dons are playing in League Two. A supporter-led phoenix club, AFC Wimbledon was founded in 2002 and play in EFL League One	
Workington	1951–52	1976–77	Not re-elected	Playing in the Northern Premier League Premier Division	
Yeovil Town	2003–04	2018–19	Relegated	Playing in the National League	

== See also ==
- List of Scottish Football League clubs
- Timeline of English football
- Blackburn Olympic F.C. - First professional winners of the FA cup.
