= George Riley (broadcaster) =

British sports broadcaster from Leeds

- Occupation: Sports broadcaster

George Riley is a British sports broadcaster from Leeds. He was the co-presenter of Channel 5's Football On 5 between 2016 and 2017 alongside Lynsey Hipgrave.

== Career ==
Riley joined BBC Radio 5 Live in 2004, having previously been at the short-lived TEAMtalk 252 in 2002, and has been the voice of sport on 5 Live Breakfast since 2011. He also presented 5 live Sport for the station, and commentated on rugby league, snooker and darts for BBC TV and radio, until being suspended in 2017 following several allegations of sexual harassment. In 2019 it was reported that staff were assured he would never work for the BBC again owing to the multiple allegations of sexual assault made against him during his time working for 5 Live.

Riley has reported at major events including the 2012 London Olympics and Paralympic Games, UEFA Euro 2012, the 2014 FIFA World Cup, the 2013 Ashes, the 2013 Rugby League World Cup, the 2014 Commonwealth Games in Glasgow, as well as Wimbledon, the Cheltenham Festival, Super League and Challenge Cup finals each year.

He presented the BBC's Late Kick Off Football League show in 2013, in Yorkshire and Lincolnshire. He was a regular face and voice on the BBC's rugby league coverage, presenting the Super League Show on BBC2, and commentating on all major games for BBC Radio 5 Live.

In July 2015, he was confirmed as one of the presenters of Channel 5's Football League highlights show, Football League Tonight, alongside Kelly Cates. Riley then co-hosted alongside Lynsey Hipgrave during the 2016-17 season before both co-hosts were replaced by Colin Murray ahead of the 2017-18 EFL season.

Riley appeared as himself in Armando Iannucci's award-winning political satire The Thick Of It in 2009.

George Riley was suspended by the BBC in 2017. According to both The Times and The Guardian (April 21, 2019), George Riley resigned from BBC Radio 5 Live before an investigation was completed into allegations of sexual assault against him were made by at least eight women. The Times quotes then BBC Radio 5 Live Controller, Jonathan Wall, as saying that he will never work for the BBC again.

== Personal life ==
Riley is a charity ambassador for Joseph's Goal and the Steve Prescott Foundation (SPF), for whom he runs regular marathons. His fundraising efforts saw him run 100 miles in 2014 and four marathons in eight weeks in 2015.

He is player-manager for Sunday league team The Quays FC in Manchester, having gained promotion into Manchester and Cheshire Division One.
