= Lynsey Hipgrave =

English presenter and journalist

Lynsey Hipgrave (née Horn; born 6 September 1979) is an English television, radio presenter and journalist, currently working for British broadcaster TNT Sports.

== Broadcasting career ==
=== Radio ===
Hipgrave's initial break came on Manchester radio station Galaxy 102 where she presented the breakfast show, before being appointed a travel reporter on Radio 5 Live.

Until July 2016 she co-presented the Saturday morning show on Radio 5 Live from 9 am to 11 am with Danny Baker and she has also hosted with Eamonn Holmes and Christian O'Connell.

=== Television ===
In 2010, Hipgrave became a presenter on Al Jazeera on their English-language sports channel (Al Jazeera Sports +3) for their Champions League shows alongside Gary Lineker. She was the main anchor on Al Jazeera's coverage of the World Athletics Championships alongside Colin Jackson and Denise Lewis, the US Open Tennis Final, WTA Championships and the Asian Games.

Hipgrave is a former presenter on Setanta Sports News and Roulette Nation on Challenge Jackpot.

In 2009, Hipgrave contributed to BBC Three's World Cup's Most Shocking Moments.

In 2012, Hipgrave was a contributor to Euro's Most Shocking Moments, a follow-up programme to the earlier programme on the World Cup, this time featuring clips from football's European Championships.

In 2013, Hipgrave presented some of the African Cup of Nations games for ITV4 and hosted some of ITV4's coverage of the Europa League, including Newcastle United's quarter final tie with Benfica at St. James' Park.

In August 2013, Hipgrave began presenting on BT Sport where she has hosted Women's Tennis and Football, including presenting coverage of the Champions League, Europa League and FA Cup.

During the summer of 2014, Hipgrave worked for ESPN to help present the 2014 World Cup.

Between August 2016 and May 2017, Lynsey co-presented Channel 5's coverage of the Football League, EFL Cup and EFL Trophy, with George Riley.

== Personal life ==
Following her marriage to Toploader guitarist Dan Hipgrave in November 2008 she became known as Lynsey Hipgrave. She is a Newcastle United supporter.

== Television credits ==
- Aljazeera Sports 3 (now beIN Sports 3) (MENA)
- BBC News
- Poker Night Live
- Sky Poker Open
- Setanta Sports News (IRL and UK)
- World Cup's Most Shocking Moments
- Euro's Most Shocking Moments
- Mola TV (IDN and TLS) (2019-present)
