= Nick Halling =

British sports broadcaster and journalist

Nick Halling is a British sports broadcaster and journalist who studied English & Theology at Leeds University. He was a boxing commentator for Sky Sports and presented their American football, as well as ice hockey, ten-pin bowling and numerous other events.

Halling used to co-present the National Football League (NFL) on Sky Sports along with Kevin Cadle. He is also known for his coverage of the National Hockey League on Channel Five in the UK. He also narrated Channel 4's football programme Goalissimo, BBC's The Football League Show, KOTV Boxing magazine shows and Channel Five's World's Strongest Man.

He was the first non-American to commentate on a live NFL game in the USA and he has done work for Sky's sister network, Fox. Halling is a fan of the Pittsburgh Steelers.

He is a supporter of Southampton F.C. and regularly presents the club's season review DVDs. He is also an active supporter of his local club Boreham Wood FC.
