= Sue Thearle =

British journalist

Sue Thearle is a British journalist. She presented on the now defunct Setanta Sports News. She is currently a relief presenter on the BBC's 24-hour news channel BBC News. She was previously a sports presenter on the channel and on BBC Breakfast.

After training as a journalist, Thearle began her career on a local newspaper in Hertfordshire. During her later days there, her assistant answered her phone to England captain Bobby Moore and sold the quotes Moore gave him to a national newspaper. Thearle later met Moore at an England game a month before his death. Thearle then moved to the Daily Telegraph as a football writer, and later presented and reported for Sky TV.

Thearle joined BBC Breakfast in 1996 as a reporter, before being promoted to the presenting team. She has also reported for Grandstand and Football Focus - and was the only female voice on Match of the Day. She fluffed her lines in 1998 whilst commentating on the highlights of an FA Cup match featuring Basingstoke Town F.C., as she forgot what to say and angrily whispered an expletive.

In February 2008, Thearle began relief presenting duties on BBC News in addition to her duties as sports presenter on the channel and on BBC Breakfast.

Married to Scott, the couple have two children (born November 2003 and December 2006). A regular at Arsenal F.C., Thearle also describes herself as an average skier and a huge fan of the cinema.

In 2005 Thearle ran her first London Marathon, with partner Helen Millgate (a cancer survivor), supporting her favourite charity Help The Hospices.

On 30 May 2008, Sue left her sports presenting duties on BBC Breakfast after 13 years, to become a freelance journalist. She currently presents on the BBC News channel.
