= Dave Farrar =

British football commentator

Dave Farrar is a British broadcaster, specialising in television football commentary. He was Eurosport's number one commentator for ten years, joining the network in 1999 after spells with BBC Radio Lancashire and the BBC World Service as a replacement for Guy Mowbray.

From 2002 to 2005 he covered Serie A on a regular basis for the channel and also worked on live coverage of French football. He covered the finals of Euro 2000 and Euro 2004, as well as four African Cup of Nations tournaments.

Farrar left Eurosport in early 2009 and now can be heard worldwide on the official Premier League Podcast and as an anchorman for the Premier League's worldwide television broadcasts. He also commentates on Serie A matches for ESPN (UK). Serie A is Dave's favourite league – he is a huge fan of Juventus, and went to many bianconeri games in his youth.

He has also worked for ITV Sport, Bravo and BBC Radio 5 Live on a freelance basis. During the 2006–2007 Ashes cricket series he hosted a regular podcast for The Guardian newspaper, and he has occasionally commentated on boxing. In August 2020, Farrar was part of the BBC Sport commentary team at the World Snooker Championship.
