= Colin Murray =

Northern Irish broadcaster (born 1977)

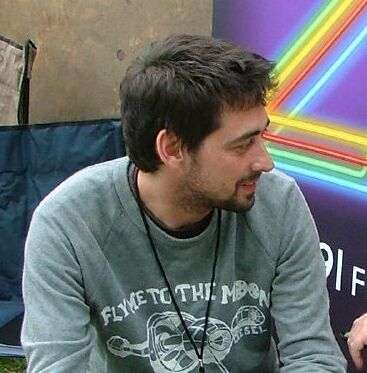
- Murray in 2005
- Born: Colin Wright; 10 March 1977 (age 49); Dundonald, Northern Ireland
- Occupations: Radio and television presenter
- Years active: 1999–present
- Known for: Presenting on: Countdown (Guest presenter: 2020–21, temporary: 2022–23, permanent: 2023–present); Formerly: Fighting Talk (2006–2013, 2016–2023); EFL on Quest (2018–2022); Talksport (2013–16); Match of the Day 2 (2010–13); 5 Live Sport (2009–2013); Channel 5 football (2006–2010, 2017–18); BBC Radio 1 (1999–2009); BBC BDO World Darts Coverage (2010–16)
- Spouse: Carly Paradis (m. 2012; sep. 2022)

Colin Murray (born Colin Wright on 10 March 1977) is a Northern Irish radio and television presenter. He has hosted the Channel 4 game show Countdown since 2023.

Born and raised in Dundonald, east of Belfast, Murray first trained and worked as a news journalist. With a passion for both music and sport, he later moved into music journalism and publishing, before making his national radio debut in 1999 on BBC Radio 1 in a short spell co-hosting The Session music show. This was followed by a television debut in 2002 as one of six co-presenters on Channel 4's short-lived morning show RI:SE. From 2003 onwards Murray established himself as a music radio presenter on the weekday daytime Colin and Edith show, alongside Edith Bowman.

In 2006, Murray began his first role on BBC Radio 5 Live, hosting the sports-themed Saturday morning comedy panel game Fighting Talk, and began presenting Channel 5's live UEFA Cup football coverage on midweek evenings. In 2006, he moved shows on Radio 1, departing Colin and Edith to front the late-night weekday evening music vehicle The Colin Murray Show. In 2008, he also began presenting The Late Show with Colin Murray, a weekly late-night music show for BBC Radio Ulster. The next year, he left Radio 1 to take on additional roles at 5 Live, hosting Kicking off with Colin Murray on Friday nights, and 5 Live Sport on Sunday afternoons. In 2010, he moved from presenting live football on Channel 5 to fronting the BBC's Match of the Day 2 Sunday night highlights show.

In 2007, he was named "Music Broadcaster of the Year" at the Sony Radio Academy Awards. In 2010, he became host of Match of the Day 2 on BBC Two, while still anchoring shows on Radio 5 Live, including 5 Live Sport and Fighting Talk and was still presenting on Radio Ulster. He has previously hosted regular Channel 5 television and Radio 1 shows.

In 2013, Murray announced he was leaving Radio 5 Live to move to commercial rival Talksport, taking up the 10 am – 1 pm slot vacated by Richard Keys and Andy Gray. Murray announced via Twitter in July 2016 that he was to leave Talksport in September 2016, following the takeover of the station by News Corp. He stated that the concomitant business links between Talksport and The Sun meant that, after the scandal of the Hillsborough disaster and of its coverage by The Sun, his position would be untenable owing to the feelings of Liverpool fans (including himself) towards that newspaper.

Between 2017 and 2022, Murray hosted the Saturday night EFL television highlights show, first for Channel 5 in the 2017/18 season and then for Quest on EFL on Quest from August 2018 until May 2022 when Quest lost the broadcasting rights to ITV.

== Life and career ==
=== 1977–1993: Early life ===
Murray was born as Colin Wright on 10 March 1977 in the Ulster Hospital in Dundonald, a suburb of East Belfast, Northern Ireland, and grew up on Dundonald's Ballybeen estate. He said on the 5 September 2022 edition of Countdown that for two days his name was Luke Wright, until "a family member pointed out that was a direction"; he later took his stepfather's surname. He was educated at the Regent House Grammar School in Newtownards, and later at Dundonald High School, leaving after GCSEs. Hyperactive since childhood, Murray was asked to leave the grammar school owing to what was perceived by teachers as a tendency to disruption – always asking awkward questions or telling jokes – traits he later identified as ideal for his future career in presenting, and which he felt should really have been nurtured by teachers.

=== 1994–2002: Early career and radio debut ===
After leaving school, Murray went on to study journalism full-time. He started work as a news journalist, working both in Northern Ireland as a trainee for The News Letter, before in 1994 moving to Toronto, Canada, for a year, working on a fellowship for the Toronto Sun. After returning from Toronto he moved into music journalism, writing for newspapers about rock and pop bands, including establishing a long-standing column in the Irish Sunday People, before moving into the music magazine business with a new title called Blank. After Murray set it up and acted as co-publisher, Blank became the highest circulating music magazine in Ulster. After Blank was merged with another title, Murray left the magazine.

Next, Murray joined BBC Radio 1 on 2 September 1999 to co-present the weekly live music programme Session in Northern Ireland on BBC Radio 1, alongside BBC Radio Ulster presenter Donna Legge, broadcast only in Northern Ireland. He had initially thought the audition was for a show on BBC Radio Ulster. That was followed by six months in 1999 presenting the main national The Session programme from Tuesdays to Thursdays. Spells deputising for hosts of other major Radio 1 shows also followed.

By 2002, Murray's work in radio and television earned him an audition as one of six co-presenters of Channel 4's new national breakfast television show, RI:SE. Having initially auditioned as the entertainment presenter, Murray was instead chosen as a news presenter. While at RI:SE he continued to co-host the evening session in Northern Ireland with Donna Legge one day a week, commuting between the province and the Channel 4 studios near Heathrow. His time with RI:SE was brief and unhappy, with Murray later stating it "scared me off TV for a long time".

=== 2003–2008: Radio career ===
By 2003, Murray had teamed up with Edith Bowman (his former co-hostess from RI:SE) to work together on Radio 1, presenting their own Colin and Edith show. It began in September 2003 in the weekend late-morning slot, but from March 2004 it was moved to the weekday afternoon slot. The partnership increased the listener figures to a decade high of 5.5 million.

In 2006, Murray became the new presenter of BBC Radio 5 Live's Saturday morning comedy sports panel quiz show, Fighting Talk, his first regular show on 5 Live. His first show was on 4 February. Also in February 2006, Murray became the anchor for Channel 5's midweek evening live European UEFA Cup football television coverage, with former anchor John Barnes acting as a roving reporter.

That year, Murray left the Radio 1 Colin and Edith show to start The Colin Murray Show, a new music show on the same station beginning in September, showcasing new and alternative music in the Mondays-to-Thursdays 10 pm – midnight slot, with Bowman remaining in the lunchtime slot. He was inevitably compared with the late holder of the slot, John Peel; Murray stated "What I like is that it's always represented honesty, and never been influenced by what's supposed to be cool at the time. Peel played music he liked; I just play music I like". In 2007, there was a year-on-year increase in listeners to the slot of 160,000.

From February 2008, Murray also began presenting a weekly late-night music show on BBC Radio Ulster in Northern Ireland. After failing to find a suitable sound location, he actually presented the show from the bedroom of his home, drawing on his extensive music collection as well as new music downloaded onto iTunes. It began as a Saturday night show, but later moved to Fridays.

=== 2009–2013: Departure from Radio 1, move to 5 Live and television career ===
In 2009, Murray resigned from his Radio 1 late night show to expand his work at BBC Radio 5 Live, becoming the new presenter of 5 Live Sport on Friday evenings and Sunday afternoons, in time for the start of the 2009/10 football season. The Friday slot was a weekend preview show, Kicking Off with Colin Murray, while the Sunday show comprises six hours of live sports coverage. Kicking Off saw an increase in listeners after its first year of almost 20 per cent, according to 5 September 2011 figures. With Murray having taken a self-imposed two months of holiday from work before starting at 5 Live, the 5 Live shows had to start without him while he recovered from a bout of H1N1 swine flu.

In 2010, he left Channel 5's football coverage team to replace Adrian Chiles as presenter of the BBC's Match of the Day 2 football highlights television programme, broadcast on Sunday nights on BBC Two as a companion show to the flagship Saturday night Match of the Day show on BBC One. He also hosted the BBC Two nightly highlights show for the 2010 FIFA World Cup hosted in South Africa through June and July.

In sports television, Murray has also presented coverage of late-night American Football and the European Poker Tour for Channel 5. From January 2010, Murray has also presented the BBC's televised coverage of the annual BDO World Darts Championship, alongside Bobby George. In music television, Murray has co-hosted Glastonbury Festival coverage for both BBC Three and Radio 1, presented a late-night music show Ear Candy on Channel 4 (under the 4music strand) and guest-presented the BBC music show Top of the Pops. He has also presented ITV2's coverage of the Brit Awards. In documentary television, in 2010 Murray co-wrote and presented the BBC Two documentary Davis v Taylor: The '85 Black Ball Final, commemorating the 25th anniversary of the 1985 World Snooker Championship final.

As a game show presenter, Murray has co-presented the Channel 4 challenge show Born Sloppy with Sara Cox; he also fronted the Sudoku-based game show Street-Cred Sudoku broadcast on UKTV G2 in 2005 and the Channel Five quiz show Payday in 2007. Other TV work has included presenting shows on BBC Three such as EastEnders Revealed, a companion show to the popular soap series. As a narrator, Murray has appeared on the BBC television series Can't Take It With You, and Boys Will Be Girls on E4. He has also provided the narration for the gameshow Scream if You Know the Answer! on Watch, alongside host Duncan James.

As a celebrity contestant/participant on various television shows, Murray has appeared as Mark Knopfler on Celebrity Stars in Their Eyes in 2005, performed in Comic Relief does Fame Academy in 2007, competed in the Celebrity MasterChef in 2009, and been a Dictionary Corner guest on the Channel 4 game show Countdown between 2009 and 2020.

In October 2011, he presented Driving Wars on digital television channel Dave.

=== 2013–2016: Departure from 5 Live and move to Talksport ===
On 22 January 2013, it was announced that Murray would be replaced as presenter of Match of the Day 2 by Mark Chapman, the change commencing at the end of the 2012–13 season. At the end of the 2013 season, Murray announced he was leaving BBC Radio 5 Live to host a new mid-morning show from 10 am to 1 pm on its commercial rival Talksport, replacing Richard Keys and Andy Gray, and therefore he would be leaving his Kicking Off show and Fighting Talk. His departure from Fighting Talk was the result of a controversy after he joked on the programme about being able to "turn" Clare Balding. Murray expressed deep regret for the line and stated that he did not come up with it, but that it had been written on his autocue. In an interview with the Guardian, he said, "The second I said it, I knew it was too much." The episode concerned was a special live outside broadcast, as opposed to the usual recorded studio format; consequently, the habitual advance checks on content had not been performed. The episode was removed from all online playback sources.

Murray made his Talksport debut on 12 August 2013 on a new show entitled Colin Murray and Friends. Murray hosted alongside Stuart Pearce and Perry Groves on Monday (previously Mike Tindall), Des Kelly and Michael Gray on Tuesday, Steve Bunce and Didi Hamann on Wednesday, Daley Thompson and Danny Murphy on Thursday (previously Kelly Sotherton), and Bob Mills and Perry Groves on Friday. The show had features such as top talking points from 10 am to 10:30 am, "Murray Meets.." with a 30-minute interview from 11 am to 11:30 am, a phone-in from 12 pm to 12:30 pm and the Sports Brief from 12:30 pm to 1 pm.

Despite leaving BBC Radio, he continued hosting the BDO World Darts Championship for BBC Television in January 2014, 2015 and 2016, alongside Bobby George and Talksport commentator Jim Proudfoot (who occasionally guested on his show), and also hosted occasional music programmes for BBC Radio 6 Music. In 2013, he hosted the two NFL International Series Matches for Channel 4, alongside Nat Coombs, Mike Carlson and Vernon Kay, and hosted the 2014 Super Bowl for the channel — its first Super Bowl in 16 years.

=== 2016–present: Departure from Talksport and return to 5 Live ===
Despite a popular and successful run with Talksport, Murray announced he would be leaving the station with his final show being on 2 September 2016. Murray's decision to leave was triggered by the purchase of Talksport by Rupert Murdoch's News Corp, who in turn owns The Sun. Murray, a Liverpool fan, stated that he was concerned by the "inevitable closer association of the station with the Sun newspaper". On 12 September, Murray announced via his Twitter feed that he would be returning to BBC Radio 5 Live to host Fighting Talk.

In early 2023, Murray announced his resignation from Fighting Talk and Rick Edwards took over from its return from summer recess in September 2023. During the coronavirus pandemic, Murray co-hosted "Coronavirus Call-In's" on 5 Live with Dr. Chris Smith. Murray also hosted the late evening show from 22:30 to 01:00 on Monday-Thursday until January 2023, which (during lockdown) included a virtual pub called The Lock-Inn which was broadcast via radio and Zoom.

== Other work ==
Murray has continued his journalism work into his presenting career by writing a monthly "radio diary" piece for The Guardian newspaper. In 2005, he created a radio documentary, The Trouble With Drugs. In October 2009 he published his first book, A Random History of Football, ISBN 978-1-4091-1290-7, through Orion Publishing, a compendium of random and relatively unknown stories about football. In 2007 Murray directed magician Chris Cox's Edinburgh Fringe Festival show, Everything Happens for a Reason. Murray has also compèred at the Leeds Festival since 2004. In 2003, he co-hosted the Kerrang! Awards with Edith Bowman. From 2015 to 2021, Murray co-hosted Eurosport UK's coverage of competitive snooker, along with renowned players Ronnie O'Sullivan, Jimmy White and Neal Foulds: he decided to step down from this role at the end of the 2020-21 snooker season.

Outside the UK, Murray has been a weekly fixture on The Fan 590's breakfast programme in Toronto, Canada. He appears on Fridays with frequent FT panellist Greg Brady and Jim Lang wherein he discusses the week's big sporting topics in the UK, as well as the upcoming weekend's Premier League (or either international, FA Cup or League Cup) action.

Murray is credited as the interviewer for "Lock the Box", a 40-minute video interview with Noel and Liam Gallagher of Oasis, which discusses the tracks selected for the band's retrospective album Stop the Clocks.

On 7 November 2020, it was announced that Murray would replace Nick Hewer as host of Countdown as the second coronavirus lockdown precluded Hewer, 76, from being able to travel to the set. Murray began hosting three special episodes in December 2020 and then his first regular episode was shown on Channel 4 on 13 January 2021 and he hosted it until 16 March. Murray returned to Countdown as a temporary host on 14 July 2022, following Anne Robinson's departure, staying until at least late October, where he took a short hiatus while four guest presenters hosted each week in honour of the programme's 40th anniversary before returning on 28 November. Murray became a full-time presenter on the show starting from 23 January 2023.

== Personal life ==
Murray has been a fan of Liverpool and the Northern Ireland national team since childhood. He got five stars tattooed on his arm when Liverpool won the European Cup for the fifth time. He has also stated he is a Chester fan after falling in love with the club following their rise from closure and fronted by the fans. He was guest of honour at their end-of-season awards. On his role as both a football presenter and a fan, Murray said in 2009 that "The biggest stick I get when I'm presenting football is from Liverpool fans", and in 2010 "I like a laugh but I am serious also about football and the impartiality required to respect all football fans." Murray is also the Irish Football Association's Football for All ambassador.

Whilst living in Toronto, Canada, Murray became a supporter of the baseball team Toronto Blue Jays and a fan of Major League Baseball in general, and has since spent his annual summer holidays in North America watching MLB games. Murray is also a season ticket-holder at the Welsh club Pontypridd Town, with whom he has promoted tours across Spain, where Pontypridd played pre-season fixtures against Villarreal and Valencia.

Murray stated on his 5 Live show on 21 December 2020, following a reference to paganism, that he was an atheist.

Murray married Carly Paradis in 2012. They separated in 2022.

== Awards ==
Murray has won three Gold Sony Radio Academy Awards. In the 2007 Sony Awards he was named 'Music Broadcaster of the Year'; in the 2005 Awards he was given the Feature Award for a documentary, entitled The Trouble with Drugs, while in 2011 he took gold for best sport programme, for Fighting Talk.

In 2002, Murray was named IPR Northern Ireland Entertainment Journalist of the Year, for his long-running music column in the Irish Sunday People.
