= Dan O'Hagan =

British football commentator (born 1978)

Daniel O'Hagan is a freelance football commentator and TV presenter as well as covering the UEFA Champions League for SBS in Australia and BT Sport in England. Formerly he was the voice of the world feed for the French Football League. He is best known for being the youngest commentator in BBC Match of the Day history on the English Premier League, and also for his work on ESPN, Eurosport, Fox Sports and The Football League Show for BBC One. O'Hagan also commentates on Bundesliga games in English.

== Life ==
Originally from Stourbridge in the Black Country he lived in Norwich, Norfolk for many years while working for Anglia Television. He attended Bournemouth University and graduated in 1999 with a degree in Multi-Media Journalism. Between 2009 and 2012 he was one of the commentators for the Royal International Air Tattoo at RAF Fairford. He also produces and presents the popular Display Frequency aviation podcast. O'Hagan is a keen fundraiser for Alzheimer's disease charities, and has been since his father was diagnosed with the condition.

He supports Wolverhampton Wanderers.

O'Hagan received a threatening email that was from an IP address located in the House of Commons in June 2020, whose sender declared that he was trying to find the place where O'Hagan lived. The threat came after O'Hagan had criticised prominent right-wing politician Nigel Farage.
