= English Football League =

Association football league

- Founded: 17 April 1888; 138 years ago
- Country: England (68 teams)
- Other club from: Wales (4 teams)
- Confederation: UEFA
- Chairman: Rick Parry
- Chief Executive Officer: Trevor Birch
- Divisions: EFL Championship; EFL League One; EFL League Two
- Number of clubs: 72
- Level on pyramid: 1 (until 1992); 2–4 (from 1992)
- Promotion to: Premier League
- Relegation to: National League
- Domestic cup: FA Cup
- League cups: EFL Cup; EFL Trophy
- Current champions: Coventry City (2025–26)
- Broadcasters: Sky Sports; ITV Sport (highlights)
- Website: efl.com
- Current: 2026–27 English Football League

The English Football League (EFL) is a league of professional clubs from England and Wales. Founded in 1888 as the Football League, it is the oldest football league in the world, and was the top-level football league in England from its foundation until 1992, when the top 22 clubs split from it to form the Premier League. The Football League was rebranded as the "English Football League" (EFL) starting with the 2016–17 season.

The EFL is divided into the Championship, League One and League Two, with 24 clubs in each division, 72 in total, with promotion and relegation between them; the top Championship division clubs change places with the lowest-placed clubs in the Premier League, and the bottom clubs of League Two with the top clubs of the National League. Currently four of the EFL clubs are from Wales – Cardiff City, Swansea City, Wrexham and Newport County – the other 68 are located in England.

The Football League had a sponsor from the 1983–84 season, and thus was known by various names.

The English Football League also organises two knock-out cup competitions, the EFL Cup and the EFL Trophy. The operations centre of the Football League is in Preston, while its commercial office is in London.

== Overview ==
The Football League consists of 68 professional association football clubs in England and four in Wales. It runs the oldest professional football league competition in the world. It also organises two knockout cup competitions, the EFL Cup and EFL Trophy. The Football League was founded in 1888 by Aston Villa director William McGregor, originally with twelve member clubs. Steady growth and the addition of more divisions meant that by 1950 the League had 92 clubs. Financial considerations led to a major shake-up in 1992, when in a step to maximise their revenue the leading members of the Football League broke away to form their own competition, the FA Premier League, which was renamed the Premier League in 2007. The Football League therefore no longer includes the top twenty clubs who belong to this group, although promotion and relegation between the Football League and the Premier League continues. In total, 145 teams have played in the Football League up to 2024 (including those in the Premier League, since clubs must pass through the Football League before reaching the former).

== Competition ==
=== Divisions ===
The EFL's 72 member clubs are grouped into three divisions: the EFL Championship, EFL League One, and EFL League Two (previously the Football League First Division, Football League Second Division and Football League Third Division respectively; they were renamed for sponsorship reasons). Each division has 24 clubs. Every season each club plays the others in its division twice, at home and away, for a total of 46 games.

Clubs gain three points for a win, one for a draw, and none for a defeat. At the end of the season, clubs at the top of their division win promotion to the next higher division, while those at the bottom are relegated to the next lower one. At the top end of the competition, three Championship clubs win promotion from the Football League to the Premier League, with the bottom three Premier League clubs taking their places. At the lower end, two League Two clubs lose their Football League status with relegation to the National division of the National League, while two teams from that division join League Two of The Football League in their stead.

Division	Promoted directly	Promoted via playoffs	Relegated
EFL Championship	Top two clubs	One from 3rd to 8th-place finishers	Bottom three clubs
EFL League One	Top two clubs	One from 3rd to 6th-place finishers	Bottom four clubs
EFL League Two	Top three clubs	One from 4th to 7th-place finishers	Bottom two clubs

Promotion and relegation are determined by final league positions, but to sustain interest for more clubs over the length of the season, one promotion place from each division is decided according to a playoff among four clubs, which takes place at the end of the season. It is possible for a team finishing sixth in the Championship or League One, or seventh in League Two, to be promoted rather than the clubs finishing immediately above them in the standings.

Since the 2004–05 season, penalties have existed for clubs entering financial administration during the season. If a club enters administration before 31 March of any given season, they will immediately be deducted twelve points; entering administration from 1 April onwards will see the points deduction either held over until the end of the season (if the club finishes outside the relegation places) or applied the following season (if the club was relegated anyway). Also, it is required that a club exiting administration agrees to a Creditor's Voluntary Agreement and pays in full any other footballing creditors. Failure to do either of these will result in a second, potentially unlimited (though in practice usually between fifteen and twenty) points deduction.

The other main situation in which is a club may lose points is by fielding an improperly registered or otherwise ineligible player. If a club is found to have done this, then any points earned from any match that player participated in will be deducted; the opposing club(s) do not earn any points from this, however.

=== Cups ===
The EFL organises two knock-out cup competitions: the EFL Cup (officially known as the Carabao Cup for sponsorship reasons) and the EFL Trophy (officially known as the Vertu Trophy also for sponsorship reasons). The EFL Cup was established in 1960 and is open to all EFL and Premier League clubs; the winner becomes eligible to participate in the UEFA Europa Conference League. The EFL Trophy, established in 1983, is for clubs belonging to EFL League One and EFL League Two. The organisation celebrated its 100th anniversary in 1988 with a Centenary Tournament at Wembley between 16 of its member clubs.

Cup	Clubs
EFL Cup	92 (Championship, League One and League Two)
EFL Trophy	64 (League One, League Two, Championship U-21, Premier League U-21)

== History ==
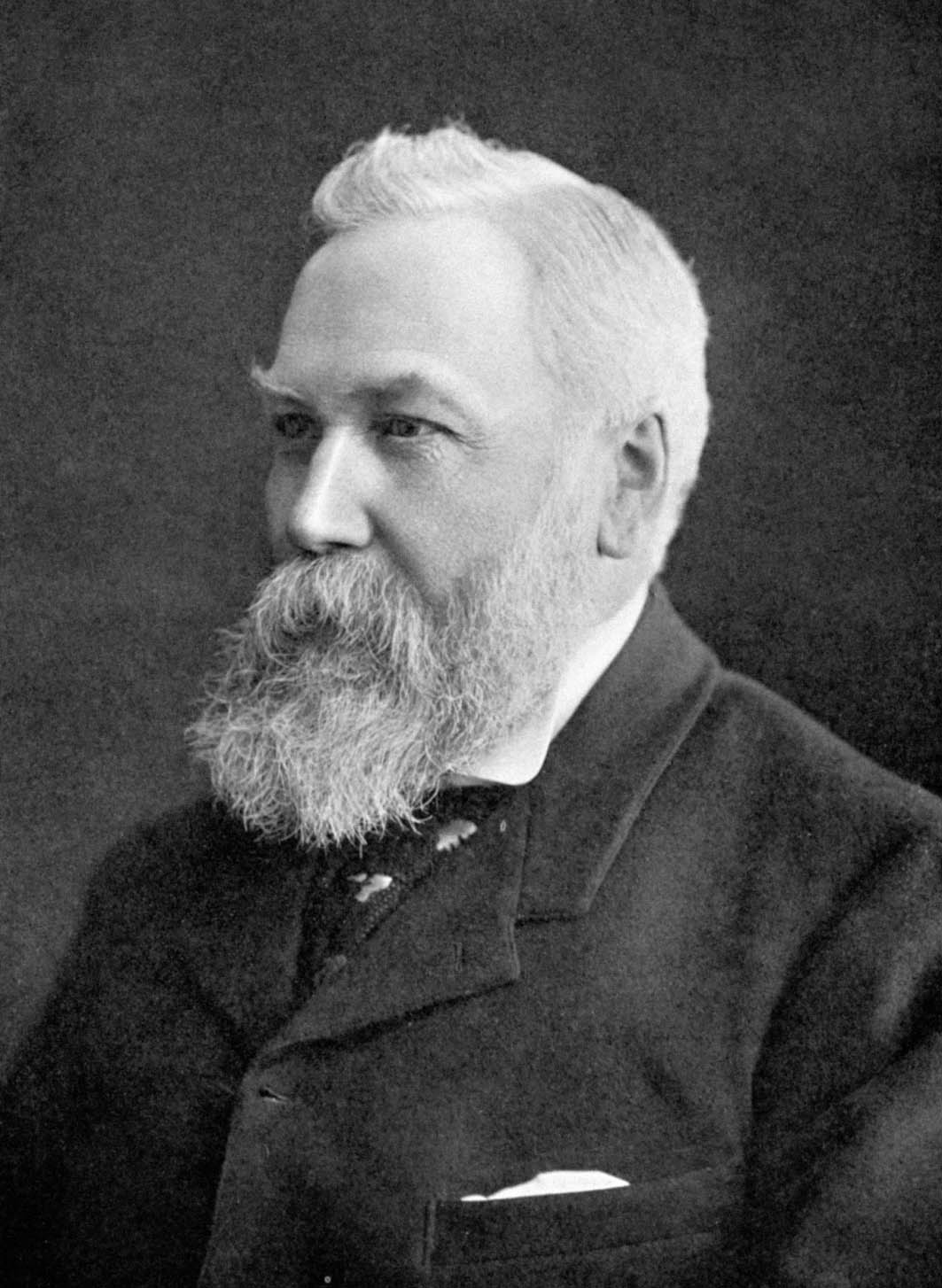
William McGregor, founder of The Football League

After four years of debate, the Football Association finally permitted professionalism on 20 July 1885. Before that date, many clubs made payments to "professional" players to boost the competitiveness of their teams, breaking FA rules and arousing the contempt of those clubs abiding by the laws of the amateur Football Association code. As more clubs became professional, the ad-hoc fixture list of FA Cup, inter-county and ordinary matches was seen by many as an unreliable stream of revenue, and ways were considered of ensuring a consistent income.

A Scottish director of Birmingham-based Aston Villa, William McGregor, was the first to set out to bring some order to a chaotic world where clubs arranged their own fixtures, along with various cup competitions. On 22 March 1888, he wrote to the committee of his own club, Aston Villa, and to those of Blackburn Rovers, Bolton Wanderers, Preston North End, Stoke and West Bromwich Albion, suggesting the creation of a league competition that would provide a number of guaranteed fixtures for its member clubs each season. His idea might have been based on a description of a proposal for an early American college football league, publicised in the English media in 1887 which stated: "measures would be taken to form a new football league ... [consisting of] a schedule containing two championship games between every two colleges composing the league".

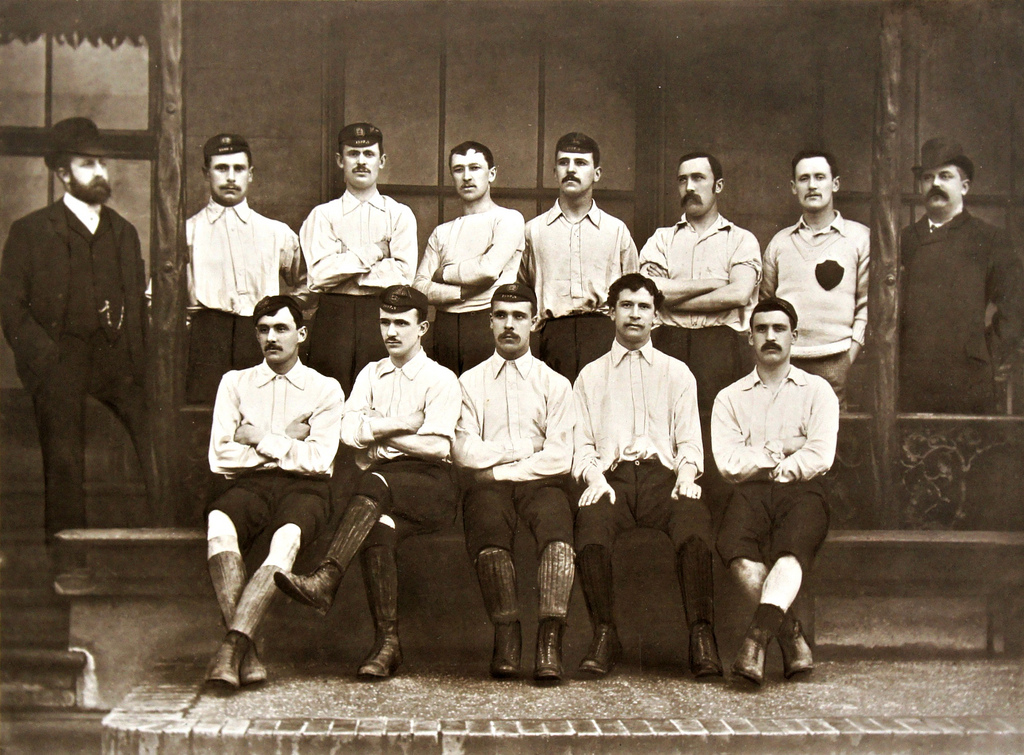
Preston North End FC, the first champions in 1888

The first meeting was held at Anderton's Hotel in London on 23 March 1888, on the eve of the FA Cup Final. The Football League was formally created and named in Manchester at a further meeting on 17 April at the Royal Hotel. The name "Association Football Union" was proposed by McGregor but this was felt too close to "Rugby Football Union". Instead, "The Football League" was proposed by Major William Sudell, representing Preston, and quickly agreed upon. Although the Royal Hotel is long gone, the site is marked with a commemorative red plaque on the Royal Buildings in Market Street. The first season of the Football League began a few months later on 8 September with twelve member clubs from the Midlands and north of England: Accrington, Aston Villa, Blackburn Rovers, Bolton Wanderers, Burnley, Derby County, Everton, Notts County, Preston North End, Stoke (renamed Stoke City in 1926), West Bromwich Albion and Wolverhampton Wanderers.

Each club played the others twice, once at home and once away, and two points were awarded for a win and one for a draw. This points system was not agreed upon until after the season had started; the alternative proposal was one point for a win only. Preston won the first league title without losing a game and completed the first league–cup double by also winning the FA Cup. A club that finished at the bottom of the table was required to reapply for its position in the league for the following year, in a process termed "re-election".

In 1890, Stoke was not re-elected to the League and was replaced for the 1890–91 season by Sunderland, which won the League in the club's second, third, and fifth years of membership. Stoke was re-elected for the 1891–92 season, and at the same time Darwen was elected; this expanded the League to fourteen clubs.

Preston North End, Aston Villa and Sunderland dominated the early years of the game. In the first ten seasons, the only other clubs to win a League title were Everton and Sheffield United.

=== Addition of the Second Division ===
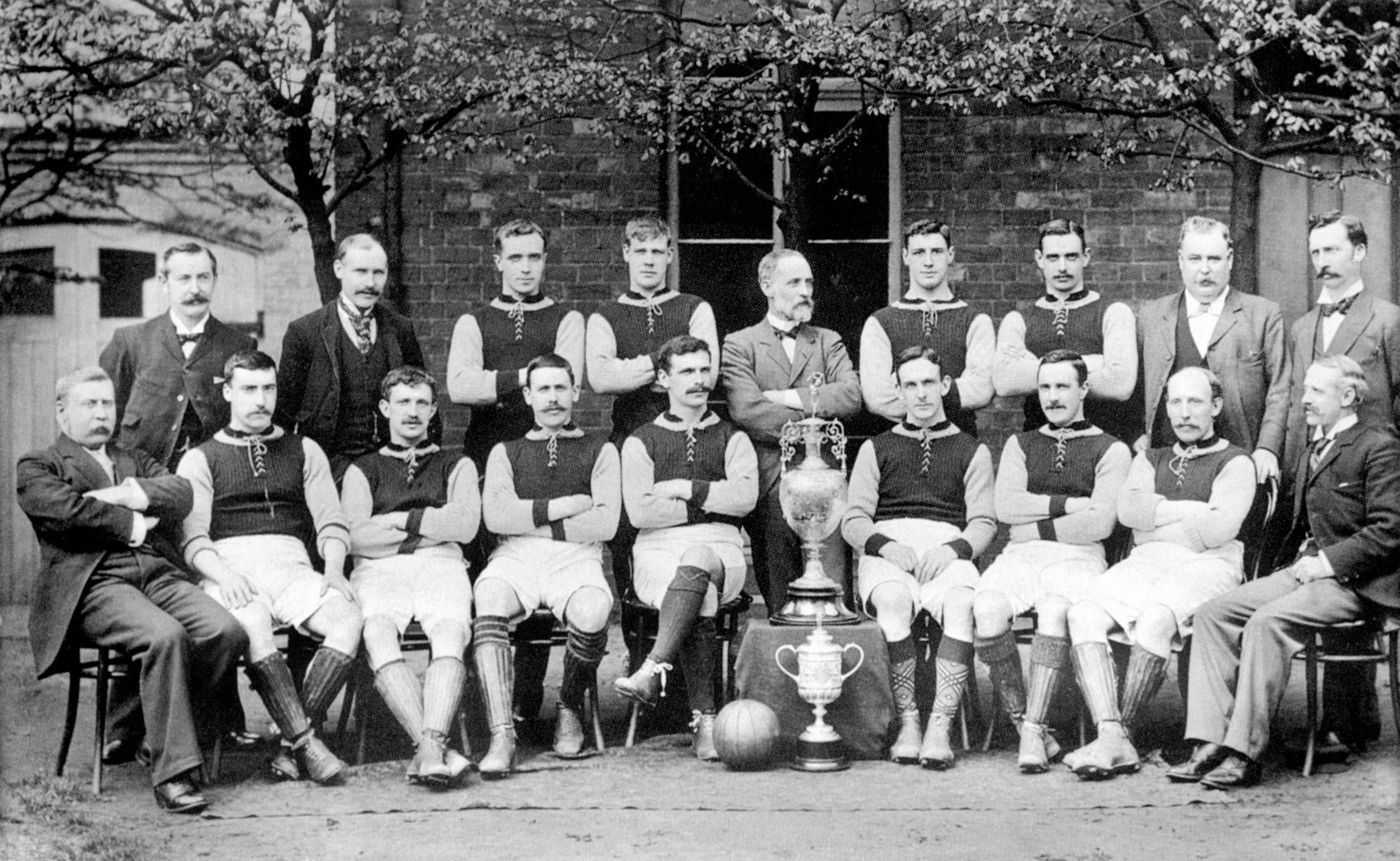
The Aston Villa team in 1897, after winning both the FA Cup and the Football League

A new Second Division was formed in 1892 with the absorption of the rival 12-club Football Alliance. Alliance clubs Nottingham Forest, The Wednesday (later renamed Sheffield Wednesday) and Newton Heath (later renamed Manchester United) joined thirteen League clubs in the new First Division, giving it sixteen members. Darwen from the League was allocated to the new Second, and Alliance club Birmingham St George's disbanded at that point. The Second Division began with twelve clubs—the eight remaining Alliance clubs with the addition of Northwich Victoria (from The Combination), Burslem Port Vale (later renamed Port Vale; from the Midland League) and Sheffield United (from the Northern League), plus Darwen. The bottom clubs of the lower division were subsequently required to apply for re-election to the League at the end of each season.

In 1893, two clubs were relegated from the First Division and two promoted from the Second, but one of those relegated, Accrington, chose to resign from the Football League rather than play in the Second Division. Meanwhile, Bootle was dissolved because of financial problems. Yet the Second Division expanded to fifteen clubs for season 1893–94 (a net increase of three) by adding five new clubs: Liverpool from the Lancashire League, Middlesbrough Ironopolis and Newcastle United from the Northern League, Rotherham Town from the Midland League, and Woolwich Arsenal (later Arsenal), who became the first team from the South of England to compete.

For its third season, 1894–95, the Second Division expanded to sixteen (net increase one) with the addition of Bury from the Lancashire League, Leicester Fosse (later Leicester City) and Burton Wanderers (which later joined with existing Second Division club Burton Swifts to form Burton United) from the Midland League, while Northwich resigned and Middlesbrough Ironopolis disbanded.

Both Liverpool and Bury won the division at the first attempt.

In 1895, Loughborough replaced Walsall Town Swifts. In 1896, Blackpool from the Lancashire League and Gainsborough Trinity from the Midland League replaced Burslem Port Vale and Crewe Alexandra. In 1897, Luton Town from the United League replaced Burton Wanderers.

Automatic promotion and relegation for two clubs in each division were introduced in 1898. The previous system of test matches between the bottom two clubs of the First Division and the top two clubs of the Second Division was brought into disrepute when Stoke and Burnley colluded in the final match on 30 April 1898 by drawing 0-0 to ensure they were both in the First Division the next season. At this point both divisions of the League expanded to eighteen, with the addition of Barnsley from the Midland and Yorkshire Leagues, Burslem Port Vale, Glossop from the Midland League, and New Brighton Tower from the Lancashire League to the Second Division.

=== Early 20th century ===
After a few years, other northern clubs began to catch up, with the likes of Newcastle United and Manchester United having success. From 1900, Aston Villa (1899–1900, 1909–10), Liverpool (1900–01, 1905–06), Sunderland (1901–02, 1912–13), The Wednesday (1902–03, 1903–04), Newcastle United (1904–05, 1908–09), Manchester United (1907–08, 1910–11) and Blackburn Rovers (1911–12, 1913–14) all won two titles prior to the outbreak of the First World War, while Everton added a second title to its much earlier success in the last season, 1914–15.

It was not until the early years of the 20th century, and the expansion of both Leagues to 20 clubs (in 1905), that further southern clubs such as Chelsea and Clapton Orient (later Leyton Orient) (1905), Fulham (1907) and Tottenham Hotspur (1908) established themselves in the League. There was a further wait until 1931 before a southern club, Arsenal, won the League for the first time.

Unlike in most other leagues in Europe, no single English club managed to remain ever-present in the division during the 104 years of its existence as the top division in the country. Everton comes closest, missing just four seasons through relegation, and remains one of only three clubs in England to have played more than 100 top-flight seasons, along with Aston Villa and Arsenal. Arsenal is also the longest-serving member of the top division, present since 1919.

=== Post–First World War ===
The League was suspended for four seasons during the First World War, and resumed in 1919 with the First and Second Divisions expanded to 22 clubs. Upon resumption, West Bromwich Albion (1919–20) and Burnley (1920–21) – both among the original twelve clubs – won their first-ever titles (in Albion's case, its only title to date).

In 1920, leading clubs from the Southern League joined the League to form a new Third Division, which in 1921 was renamed the Third Division South upon the further addition of more clubs in a new Third Division North. One club from each of these divisions would gain promotion to the Second Division, with the two relegated clubs being assigned to the more appropriate Third Division. To accommodate potential difficulties in this arrangement, clubs in the Midlands such as Mansfield Town or Walsall would sometimes be moved from one-Third Division to the other.

Following this burst of post-war growth, the League entered a prolonged period of relative stability with few changes in the membership, although there were changes on the pitch. In 1925, a new offside law reduced the number of defending opponents between the attacking player and the goal from three to two, leading to a large increase in goals, and numbers on shirts were introduced in 1939.

Between 1923 and 1926, Huddersfield Town were the first team to win three consecutive league titles (and never won another one, though they finished as runners-up for the following two years). This was equalled by Arsenal between 1932 and 1935, during a period from 1930 to 1938 in which they won five titles out of eight.

Manchester City (1936–37) became the only other club to be added to the list of Football League winners prior to the outbreak of the Second World War, the fourteenth club to achieve the feat since 1888–89.

In the 1938–39 season Everton won the title for the fifth time but suffered the same fate as in 1915, being champions when football was suspended due to the World War.

=== Post-Second World War ===
The League was suspended once more in 1939 with the outbreak of the Second World War, this time for seven seasons. The Third Divisions were expanded to 24 clubs each in 1950, bringing the total number of League clubs to 92, and in 1958 the decision was made to end the regionalisation of the Third Divisions and reorganise the clubs into a new nationwide Third Division and Fourth Division. To accomplish this, the clubs in the top half of both the Third Division North and South joined together to form the new Third Division, and those in the bottom half made up the Fourth Division. An earlier suggestion that the Third Division South should become the Third Division and the Third Division North become the Fourth Division on the basis of better attendances and that they tended to fare better when promoted was rejected. Four clubs were promoted and relegated between these two lower divisions, while two clubs exchanged places in the upper divisions until 1974 when the number increased to three.

Clubs to win their first League titles in the quarter-century following the Second World War were Portsmouth (1948–49 and 1949–50), Tottenham Hotspur (1950–51 and 1960–61), founder members of the League Wolverhampton Wanderers (1953–54, 1957–58 and 1958–59), Chelsea (1954–55), Ipswich Town (1961–62) and Leeds United (1968–69).

Tottenham Hotspur became the first club in the 20th century to win the League and FA Cup "double" in 1960–61, a season after Wolverhampton Wanderers had nearly achieved the feat themselves (Wolves won the 1959–60 FA Cup and were runners-up to Burnley in the League by a single point).

Post–Second World War changes in league football included the use of white balls in 1951 and the first floodlight game (played between Portsmouth and Newcastle United) in 1956, opening up the possibility of midweek evening matches.

By far the biggest change for league clubs during this era was a new cup competition open to all the members of the League, the Football League Cup. The League Cup was held for the first time in 1960–61 to provide clubs with a new source of income with Aston Villa winning that inaugural year. Despite an initial lack of enthusiasm on the part of some other big clubs, the competition became firmly established in the footballing calendar. It was not until the dawn of the 1970s, though, that all 92 Football League clubs regularly participated in the competition.

Substitutes (one per team per match) were first allowed in 1965 for injured players and for any reason the following year.

=== 1970s ===
The first ever League game to be held on a Sunday took place on 20 January 1974 (11:30 kick-off) and was played between Second Division rivals Millwall and Fulham at The Den. Millwall won 1–0. The first ever Sunday top-flight game was between Chelsea and Stoke a week later.

Beginning with the 1976–77 season, the clubs finishing level on points began to be separated according to goal difference (the difference between goals scored and goals conceded) rather than goal average (goals scored divided by goals conceded). This was an effort to prevent unduly defensive play encouraged by the greater advantage in limiting goals allowed. In the event that clubs had equal points and equal goal differences, priority was given to the club that had scored the most goals. There has been only one season, 1988–89, when this level of differentiation was necessary to determine the League champion, and this was the occasion of one of the most dramatic nights in League history, when Arsenal beat Liverpool 2–0 at Anfield in the last game of the season to win the League on this tiebreaker – by a single Michael Thomas goal in the final minute of the final game of the season. Both teams finished with the same amount of goal difference, but Arsenal had scored more goals during the season.

Two clubs won their first League titles during the 1970s: founder members of the League Derby County (1971–72 and 1974–75) and Nottingham Forest (1977–78), both clubs managed by Brian Clough and Peter Taylor. Nottingham Forest's title in 1977–78 turned out to be the last occasion that a first-time champion won the First Division title during The Football League era, before the First Division clubs formed the Premier League in 1992. The next first-time League champion club would be Leicester City in the 2015–16 season, the first such during the Premier League era.

=== 1980s: 3 points era ===
Another important change was made at the start of the 1981–82 season when it was decided to award three points for a win instead of two, a further effort to increase attacking football. (This scoring rule was not added by FIFA to the World Cups until the 1994 cup after the perceived dominance of defensive play at Italia 90).

The early 1980s also saw a very significant decline in league attendances as a result of the recession and the ongoing problem of hooliganism. This did no favours for the financial position and league standing of numerous clubs, and several – including Wolverhampton Wanderers, Swansea City and Middlesbrough – were almost forced out of business as a result. The fortunes of the First Division clubs suffered a fresh blow in 1985 when all English clubs were banned from European competitions as a result of the Heysel disaster, where crowd trouble involving Liverpool fans at the European Cup final in Belgium resulted in 39 spectator deaths during a crush in a Juventus fan section. The loss of life occurred when a surge in the crowd (moving away from clashes between rival supporters) caused a wall to collapse. Inadequate segregation, stewarding and policing as well the generally poor condition of the ageing stadium were attributed as contributory factors.

In a similar vein, playoffs to determine promotion places were introduced for the 1986–87 season so that more clubs remained eligible for promotion closer to the end of the season, and at the same time to aid in the reduction over two years of the number of clubs in the First Division from 22 to 20. For the first two seasons, the playoffs were contested between the lowest placed team to avoid automatic relegation and three highest-placed teams to miss out on automatic promotion in the division below before it was altered from the 1988–89 season to include just the four clubs who had missed out on automatic promotion in the Second, Third and Fourth Divisions. 1986–87 was the first season of the decade where Football League attendances increased, helped by improved economic conditions and falling unemployment nationally.

At the same time, automatic promotion and relegation between the Fourth Division and the Football Conference were introduced for one club, replacing the annual application for re-election to the League of the bottom four clubs and linking the League to the developing National League System pyramid.

Emblematic of the confusion that was beginning to envelop the game, the number of clubs at the top of the league would return to 22 for the 1991–92 season, which increased competitiveness in the 1990–91 season as four teams would be promoted from the Second and Third Divisions instead of the normal three (with the seventh-place being the minimum position for the playoffs), while in the Fourth Division an unprecedented five promotion places were up for grabs, with the eighth-place being high enough for the playoffs. The end of the ban on English clubs in Europe also helped boost interest in English football. However, the economy was now in another recession and added to that the clubs in the top two English divisions were faced with the requirement of having all-seater stadiums by 1994–95 to comply with the Taylor Report that followed the death of 97 Liverpool fans as a result of the Hillsborough disaster in April 1989.

The League also expanded to 93 clubs for the 1991–92 season and planned to raise the number again to 94 clubs for 1992–93, but after Aldershot and Maidstone United both went out of business within a few months of each other in mid-1992, this plan was abandoned. The issues creating the uncertainty in the game all centered on money.

The increasing influence of money in English football was evident with such events as the first £1m transfer in the game, that of Trevor Francis from Birmingham City to Nottingham Forest in February 1979. The first £2 million player transferred between English clubs was Tony Cottee, who moved from West Ham United to Everton in July 1988 – although several players had already been sold by English clubs to foreign clubs for even higher fees.

Before the formation of the FA Premier League, the highest transfer fee paid was £2.9 million for the transfer of Dean Saunders from Derby County to Liverpool during the 1991 close season. The first £3 million player was Alan Shearer, who moved from Southampton to Blackburn Rovers in July 1992, the summer before the first Premier League season. At the close of the 1991 season, a proposal for the establishment of a new league was tabled that would bring more money into the game overall. The Founder Members Agreement, signed on 17 July 1991 by the game's top-flight clubs, established the basic principles for setting up the FA Premier League. The newly formed top division would have commercial independence from the Football Association and the Football League, giving the FA Premier League licence to negotiate its own broadcast and sponsorship agreements. The argument given at the time was that the extra income would allow English clubs to compete with teams across Europe.

=== 1992: Foundation of the Premier League ===
During the 1991–92 season, the First Division clubs resigned from the Football League en masse and on 20 February 1992, the Premier League was formed as a limited company working out of an office at the Football Association's then headquarters in Lancaster Gate. This meant a break-up of the 104-year-old Football League that had operated until then with four divisions; the Premier League would operate with a single division and the Football League with three. There was no change in competition format; the same number of teams competed in the top flight, and promotion and relegation between the Premier League and the new First Division remained on the same terms as between the old First and Second Divisions.

The 1991–92 season had ended with 92 clubs in the Football League, with the 93rd club, Aldershot, having been declared bankrupt and forced to resign from the Fourth Division a few weeks before the end of the season. Colchester United, the Football Conference champions, were promoted to the new Division Three as the 71st members of the reorganised Football League. However, this number would soon drop to 70 due to the closure of Maidstone United at the beginning of the 1992–93 season, and the Football League abandoned its expansion plan. This meant that there would once again be 92 clubs in the highest four divisions of English football.

=== 1992–2004: Three divisions ===
There were few major changes to the structure Football League in the 12 seasons which followed the breakaway that created the FA Premier League, perhaps the only notable changes being an expansion to 72 clubs from 70 for the 1995–96 season after the Premier League was streamlined to 20 clubs from 22, and the introduction of a second relegation place to the Football Conference from the end of the 2002–03 season.

However, following the formation of the Premier League, it became increasingly difficult for newly promoted clubs to establish themselves in the top flight. Whereas newly promoted teams had once normally survived for at least a few seasons in the old First Division, it was now the norm for at least one newly promoted club to be relegated straight back from the Premier League to Division One. In the nine seasons that followed the formation of the Premier League, at least one newly promoted club suffered this fate – and in the 1997–98 season, it happened to all three newly promoted teams. There were exceptions, however, including Blackburn Rovers, who were promoted to the Premier League on its formation and were champions three years later, and Newcastle United, who were promoted in 1993 and finished in the top six for the next four seasons, finishing Premier League runners-up twice.

The trend of relegated clubs to win an instant promotion back to the top flight continued, however. In the 12 seasons following the formation of the Premier League, there were just three seasons where none of the newly relegated sides failed to win an instant return to the Premier League.

The widening gulf between the top two divisions of English football can largely be put down to the increased wealth of the Premier League clubs, and the wealth gained by these clubs – combined with parachute payments following relegation – has also made it easier for many of them to quickly win promotion back to the top flight.

In spite of the economic prosperity between 1992 and 2004, many Football League clubs did run into financial problems during this time, although none of them were forced out of business. These include Oxford United, Luton Town, Sheffield Wednesday, Nottingham Forest, Portsmouth, Bradford City and Leicester City. Some of these clubs were faced with financial problems as a result of the lost revenue resulting from Premier League relegation and a failure to return to this level, as well as the collapse of ITV Digital in 2002.

Just after the end of the 2001–02 season, South London–based Wimbledon was given permission to move to Milton Keynes, some 70 miles from its traditional home. A relocation on this scale was unprecedented in English football and led to the majority of the club's fans switching their support to a new fan-formed club, AFC Wimbledon, which joined the Combined Counties League. The club's move to Milton Keynes was completed in September 2003, when they became tenants of the National Hockey Stadium until a new permanent home was completed four years later, and the club's name changed to Milton Keynes Dons in June 2004.

=== 2004 Football League rebranding ===
2004–05 was the first season to feature the rebranded Football League. The First Division, Second Division and Third Division were renamed the Football League Championship, Football League One, and Football League Two respectively. Coca-Cola replaced the Nationwide Building Society as title sponsor.

The Football League's collection of historic materials is held by the National Football Museum.

=== 2016 rebranding ===
On 12 November 2015, The Football League announced that it would be officially renamed the English Football League, with the abbreviation EFL to be emphasised, effective from the beginning of the 2016–17 season. The rebranding would include a new logo consisting of a circle composed of three swathes of 24 smaller circles each. The three swathes are to represent the three divisions and the 24 circles in each swathe (making a total of 72 circles) represent the 72 clubs in the league system. Each club is to be presented with its own bespoke version of the logo. Football League Chief Executive Shaun Harvey said:

The new EFL name rightly emphasises the central role our clubs play at the heart of English professional football. In an increasingly challenging global sports market, it is absolutely essential that sports properties can project a modern identity that not only resonates with their regular audience but is also easily recognisable to a broader audience of potential fans, viewers, and commercial partners. We believe the EFL name and brand will give our competitions an identity that is new and distinct, while at the same time retaining our unique heritage. As such, it will be something that all fans can identify with – whether they be young or old, at home or abroad.

=== 2019 review of EFL financial regulations ===
The EFL expulsion of Bury and the threatened expulsion of Bolton Wanderers after both League One clubs became insolvent during the summer of 2019 prompted the EFL to commission an independent review of its regulations concerning the financial sustainability of member clubs.

=== Project Big Picture ===
"Project Big Picture" was a plan announced in October 2020 to reunite the top Premier League clubs with the EFL, proposed by leading Premier League clubs Manchester United and Liverpool. The plan was criticised by the Premier League leadership and the UK government's Department for Digital, Culture, Media and Sport. The Premier League rejected the proposal a few days later.

== Trophies ==
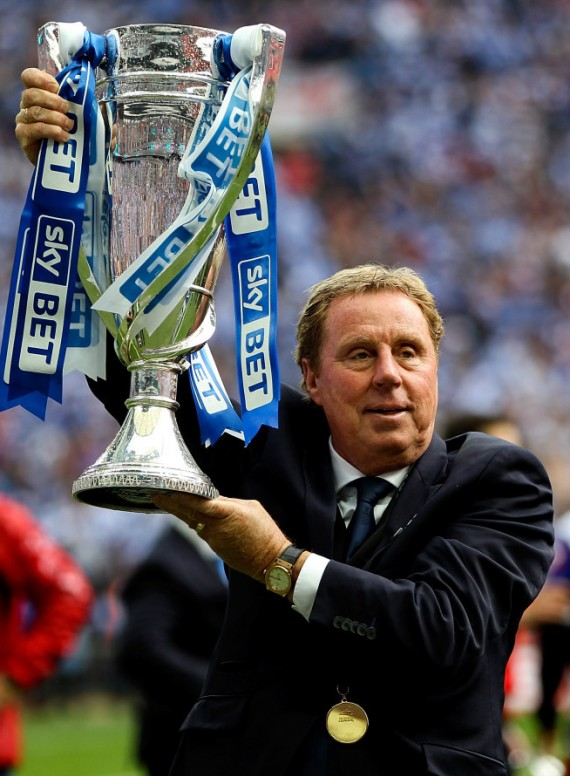
Harry Redknapp lifts the Sky Bet play-off final trophy

There are six trophies for the English Football League: the Championship trophy differs from the trophies for the League One Champions, League Two Champions, and the Championship, League One and League Two play-off finals. The latter five trophies share a similar design, and were all made by British silversmiths, Thomas Lyte.

All winners' trophies feature three handles, and the league champion's trophy's handles are plated in gold. The champion's trophies are 50cm tall and the play-off final trophies are 45cm tall.

Runners up trophies are also made for each league, featuring two handles, standing at 40cm.

== Current member clubs ==
Below are listed the member clubs of the English Football League. Since 1888, in total there have been 145 Football League members. Originally the bottom club(s) of the bottom division(s) had to apply for re-election each year, which was voted by all the other members. Walsall holds the record for the most reapplications for the Football League. Former Football League clubs include all 20 of the current members of the Premier League along with various relegated, removed or defunct clubs.

Locations of the Football League clubs by division
– Championship – League One – League Two

=== Championship ===
- Birmingham City
- Blackburn Rovers
- Bolton Wanderers
- Burnley
- Bristol City
- Cardiff City
- Charlton Athletic
- Derby County
- Lincoln City
- Middlesbrough
- Millwall
- Norwich City
- Portsmouth
- Preston North End
- Queens Park Rangers
- Sheffield United
- Southampton
- Stoke City
- Swansea City
- Watford
- West Bromwich Albion
- West Ham United
- Wolverhampton Wanderers
- Wrexham

=== League One ===
- AFC Wimbledon
- Barnsley
- Blackpool
- Bradford City
- Bromley
- Burton Albion
- Cambridge United
- Doncaster Rovers
- Huddersfield Town
- Leyton Orient
- Leicester City
- Luton Town
- Mansfield Town
- Milton Keynes Dons
- Notts County
- Oxford United
- Peterborough United
- Plymouth Argyle
- Reading
- Sheffield Wednesday
- Stevenage
- Stockport County
- Wigan Athletic
- Wycombe Wanderers

=== League Two ===
- Accrington Stanley
- Barnet
- Bristol Rovers
- Cheltenham Town
- Chesterfield
- Colchester United
- Crawley Town
- Crewe Alexandra
- Exeter City
- Fleetwood Town
- Gillingham
- Grimsby Town
- Newport County
- Northampton Town
- Oldham Athletic
- Port Vale
- Rochdale
- Rotherham United
- Salford City
- Shrewsbury Town
- Swindon Town
- Tranmere Rovers
- Walsall
- York City

== Past League winners ==
NB: League and FA Cup double winners are highlighted in bold.

=== 1888–1892 ===
When the Football League was first established, all 12 clubs played in just one division.

No.	Season	Champions
1	1888–89	Preston North End
2	1889–90	Preston North End
3	1890–91	Everton
4	1891–92	Sunderland

=== 1892–1920 ===
In 1892 the Football League absorbed 11 of the 12 clubs in the rival Football Alliance after it folded, meaning the League now had enough clubs to form another division. The existing division was renamed the First Division and the new division was named the Second Division, which comprised most of the Football Alliance's clubs.

No.	Season	First Division champions	Second Division champions
5	1892–93	Sunderland	Birmingham
6	1893–94	Aston Villa	Liverpool
7	1894–95	Sunderland	Bury
8	1895–96	Aston Villa	Liverpool
9	1896–97	Aston Villa	Notts County
10	1897–98	Sheffield United	Burnley
11	1898–99	Aston Villa	Manchester City
12	1899–1900	Aston Villa	The Wednesday
13	1900–01	Liverpool	Grimsby Town
14	1901–02	Sunderland	West Bromwich Albion
15	1902–03	The Wednesday	Manchester City
16	1903–04	The Wednesday	Preston North End
17	1904–05	Newcastle United	Liverpool
18	1905–06	Liverpool	Bristol City
19	1906–07	Newcastle United	Nottingham Forest
20	1907–08	Manchester United	Bradford City
21	1908–09	Newcastle United	Bolton Wanderers
22	1909–10	Aston Villa	Manchester City
23	1910–11	Manchester United	West Bromwich Albion
24	1911–12	Blackburn Rovers	Derby County
25	1912–13	Sunderland	Preston North End
26	1913–14	Blackburn Rovers	Notts County
27	1914–15	Everton	Derby County
–	1915–19	League suspended due to World War I	
28	1919–20	West Bromwich Albion	Tottenham Hotspur

=== 1920–1921 ===
In 1920 the Football League admitted the clubs from the first division of the Southern League (the Southern League continued with its remaining clubs) and Grimsby Town, who had failed to be re-elected to the Second Division the season before and been replaced by Cardiff City (of the Southern League). The clubs were placed in the new Third Division:

No.	Season	First Division champions	Second Division champions	Third Division champions
29	1920–21	Burnley	Birmingham	Crystal Palace

=== 1921–1958 ===
After just one season under the old format, the League expanded again. This time it admitted a number of clubs from the north of England to balance things out, as the last expansion brought mainly clubs from the south. The existing Third Division was renamed the Third Division South, and the new division was named the Third Division North. Grimsby Town transferred to the new northern division. Both divisions ran in parallel, with clubs from both Third Divisions being promoted to the national Second Division at the end of each season:

No.	Season	First Division champions	Second Division champions	Third Division (North) champions	Third Division (South) champions
30	1921–22	Liverpool	Nottingham Forest	Stockport County	Southampton
31	1922–23	Liverpool	Notts County	Nelson	Bristol City
32	1923–24	Huddersfield Town	Leeds United	Wolverhampton Wanderers	Portsmouth
33	1924–25	Huddersfield Town	Leicester City	Darlington	Swansea Town
34	1925–26	Huddersfield Town	The Wednesday	Grimsby Town	Reading
35	1926–27	Newcastle United	Middlesbrough	Stoke City	Bristol City
36	1927–28	Everton	Manchester City	Bradford Park Avenue	Millwall
37	1928–29	The Wednesday	Middlesbrough	Bradford City	Charlton Athletic
38	1929–30	Sheffield Wednesday	Blackpool	Port Vale	Plymouth Argyle
39	1930–31	Arsenal	Everton	Chesterfield	Notts County
40	1931–32	Everton	Wolverhampton Wanderers	Lincoln City	Fulham
41	1932–33	Arsenal	Stoke City	Hull City	Brentford
42	1933–34	Arsenal	Grimsby Town	Barnsley	Norwich City
43	1934–35	Arsenal	Brentford	Doncaster Rovers	Charlton Athletic
44	1935–36	Sunderland	Manchester United	Chesterfield	Coventry City
45	1936–37	Manchester City	Leicester City	Stockport County	Luton Town
46	1937–38	Arsenal	Aston Villa	Tranmere Rovers	Millwall
47	1938–39	Everton	Blackburn Rovers	Barnsley	Newport County
48	1939–40	League aborted due to World War II			
–	1940–46	League suspended due to World War II			
49	1946–47	Liverpool	Manchester City	Doncaster Rovers	Cardiff City
50	1947–48	Arsenal	Birmingham City	Lincoln City	Queens Park Rangers
51	1948–49	Portsmouth	Fulham	Hull City	Swansea Town
52	1949–50	Portsmouth	Tottenham Hotspur	Doncaster Rovers	Notts County
53	1950–51	Tottenham Hotspur	Preston North End	Rotherham United	Nottingham Forest
54	1951–52	Manchester United	Sheffield Wednesday	Lincoln City	Plymouth Argyle
55	1952–53	Arsenal	Sheffield United	Oldham Athletic	Bristol Rovers
56	1953–54	Wolverhampton Wanderers	Leicester City	Port Vale	Ipswich Town
57	1954–55	Chelsea	Birmingham City	Barnsley	Bristol City
58	1955–56	Manchester United	Sheffield Wednesday	Grimsby Town	Leyton Orient
59	1956–57	Manchester United	Leicester City	Derby County	Ipswich Town
60	1957–58	Wolverhampton Wanderers	West Ham United	Scunthorpe United	Brighton & Hove Albion

=== 1958–1992 ===
For the beginning of the 1958–59 season, national Third and Fourth Divisions were introduced to replace the regional Third Division North and Third Division South:

No.	Season	First Division champions	Second Division champions	Third Division champions	Fourth Division champions
61	1958–59	Wolverhampton Wanderers	Sheffield Wednesday	Plymouth Argyle	Port Vale
62	1959–60	Burnley	Aston Villa	Southampton	Walsall
63	1960–61	Tottenham Hotspur	Ipswich Town	Bury	Peterborough United
64	1961–62	Ipswich Town	Liverpool	Portsmouth	Millwall
65	1962–63	Everton	Stoke City	Northampton Town	Brentford
66	1963–64	Liverpool	Leeds United	Coventry City	Gillingham
67	1964–65	Manchester United	Newcastle United	Carlisle United	Brighton & Hove Albion
68	1965–66	Liverpool	Manchester City	Hull City	Doncaster Rovers
69	1966–67	Manchester United	Coventry City	Queens Park Rangers	Stockport County
70	1967–68	Manchester City	Ipswich Town	Oxford United	Luton Town
71	1968–69	Leeds United	Derby County	Watford	Doncaster Rovers
72	1969–70	Everton	Huddersfield Town	Leyton Orient	Chesterfield
73	1970–71	Arsenal	Leicester City	Preston North End	Notts County
74	1971–72	Derby County	Norwich City	Aston Villa	Grimsby Town
75	1972–73	Liverpool	Burnley	Bolton Wanderers	Southport
76	1973–74	Leeds United	Middlesbrough	Oldham Athletic	Peterborough United
77	1974–75	Derby County	Manchester United	Blackburn Rovers	Mansfield Town
78	1975–76	Liverpool	Sunderland	Hereford United	Lincoln City
79	1976–77	Liverpool	Wolverhampton Wanderers	Mansfield Town	Cambridge United
80	1977–78	Nottingham Forest	Bolton Wanderers	Wrexham	Watford
81	1978–79	Liverpool	Crystal Palace	Shrewsbury Town	Reading
82	1979–80	Liverpool	Leicester City	Grimsby Town	Huddersfield Town
83	1980–81	Aston Villa	West Ham United	Rotherham United	Southend United
84	1981–82	Liverpool	Luton Town	Burnley	Sheffield United
85	1982–83	Liverpool	Queens Park Rangers	Portsmouth	Wimbledon
86	1983–84	Liverpool	Chelsea	Oxford United	York City
87	1984–85	Everton	Oxford United	Bradford City	Chesterfield
88	1985–86	Liverpool	Norwich City	Reading	Swindon Town
89	1986–87	Everton	Derby County	AFC Bournemouth	Northampton Town
90	1987–88	Liverpool	Millwall	Sunderland	Wolverhampton Wanderers
91	1988–89	Arsenal	Chelsea	Wolverhampton Wanderers	Rotherham United
92	1989–90	Liverpool	Leeds United	Bristol Rovers	Exeter City
93	1990–91	Arsenal	Oldham Athletic	Cambridge United	Darlington
94	1991–92	Leeds United	Ipswich Town	Brentford	Burnley

=== 1992–2004 ===
Following the breakaway of the 22 clubs in the First Division to form the FA Premier League, the Football League no longer included the top division in England, and the Football League champions were no longer the national champions of England. Therefore, the Second Division became the First Division, the Third Division became the Second Division and the Fourth Division became the Third Division.

No.	Season	First Division champions	Second Division champions	Third Division champions
95	1992–93	Newcastle United	Stoke City	Cardiff City
96	1993–94	Crystal Palace	Reading	Shrewsbury Town
97	1994–95	Middlesbrough	Birmingham City	Carlisle United
98	1995–96	Sunderland	Swindon Town	Preston North End
99	1996–97	Bolton Wanderers	Bury	Wigan Athletic
100	1997–98	Nottingham Forest	Watford	Notts County
101	1998–99	Sunderland	Fulham	Brentford
102	1999–2000	Charlton Athletic	Preston North End	Swansea City
103	2000–01	Fulham	Millwall	Brighton & Hove Albion
104	2001–02	Manchester City	Brighton & Hove Albion	Plymouth Argyle
105	2002–03	Portsmouth	Wigan Athletic	Rushden & Diamonds
106	2003–04	Norwich City	Plymouth Argyle	Doncaster Rovers

=== 2004–present ===
In 2004, the Football League renamed its divisions: the First Division became the Football League Championship, the Second Division became Football League One and the Third Division became Football League Two.

No.	Season	Championship champions	League One champions	League Two champions
107	2004–05	Sunderland	Luton Town	Yeovil Town
108	2005–06	Reading	Southend United	Carlisle United
109	2006–07	Sunderland	Scunthorpe United	Walsall
110	2007–08	West Bromwich Albion	Swansea City	Milton Keynes Dons
111	2008–09	Wolverhampton Wanderers	Leicester City	Brentford
112	2009–10	Newcastle United	Norwich City	Notts County
113	2010–11	Queens Park Rangers	Brighton & Hove Albion	Chesterfield
114	2011–12	Reading	Charlton Athletic	Swindon Town
115	2012–13	Cardiff City	Doncaster Rovers	Gillingham
116	2013–14	Leicester City	Wolverhampton Wanderers	Chesterfield
117	2014–15	AFC Bournemouth	Bristol City	Burton Albion
118	2015–16	Burnley	Wigan Athletic	Northampton Town
119	2016–17	Newcastle United	Sheffield United	Portsmouth
120	2017–18	Wolverhampton Wanderers	Wigan Athletic	Accrington Stanley
121	2018–19	Norwich City	Luton Town	Lincoln City
122	2019–20	Leeds United	Coventry City	Swindon Town
123	2020–21	Norwich City	Hull City	Cheltenham Town
124	2021–22	Fulham	Wigan Athletic	Forest Green Rovers
125	2022–23	Burnley	Plymouth Argyle	Leyton Orient
126	2023–24	Leicester City	Portsmouth	Stockport County
127	2024–25	Leeds United	Birmingham City	Doncaster Rovers
128	2025–26	Coventry City	Lincoln City	Bromley

At the end of the 2005–06 season, Reading finished with at the time a record 106 points, beating the previous record of 105 held by Sunderland. But at the end of the 2024-25 season, Birmingham City finished with 111 points and they currently have the record.

=== Titles by club ===
Due to the breakaway of the Premier League in 1992, winning the Football League title no longer makes a team the top tier champions of English football.

Club	National Crowns	Football League titles 1889–1992	Premier League titles 1993–2026	Football League titles 1993–2026	Total Football League titles
Manchester United	20	7	13	0	7
Liverpool	20	18	2	0	18
Arsenal	14	10	4	0	10
Manchester City	10	2	8	1	3
Everton	9	9	0	0	9
Aston Villa	7	7	0	0	7
Sunderland	6	6	0	4	10
Chelsea	6	1	5	0	1
Newcastle United	4	4	0	3	7
Sheffield Wednesday	4	4	0	0	4
Wolverhampton Wanderers	3	3	0	2	5
Huddersfield Town	3	3	0	0	3
Leeds United	3	3	0	2	5
Blackburn Rovers	3	2	1	0	2
Burnley	2	2	0	4	6
Portsmouth	2	2	0	1	3
Derby County	2	2	0	0	2
Preston North End	2	2	0	0	2
Tottenham Hotspur	2	2	0	0	2
Leicester City	1	0	1	2	2
Nottingham Forest	1	1	0	1	2
West Bromwich Albion	1	1	0	1	2
Ipswich Town	1	1	0	0	1
Sheffield United	1	1	0	0	1
Norwich City	0	0	0	3	3
Fulham	0	0	0	2	2
Reading	0	0	0	2	2
AFC Bournemouth	0	0	0	1	1
Bolton Wanderers	0	0	0	1	1
Cardiff City	0	0	0	1	1
Charlton Athletic	0	0	0	1	1
Coventry City	0	0	0	1	1
Crystal Palace	0	0	0	1	1
Middlesbrough	0	0	0	1	1
Queens Park Rangers	0	0	0	1	1

== Football League titles ==
Includes Premier League titles.

Team	First tier	Second tier	Third tier	Fourth tier	Total Titles
Liverpool	20	4			24
Manchester United	20	2			22
Arsenal	14				14
Manchester City	10	7			17
Everton	9	1			10
Aston Villa	7	2	1		10
Sunderland	6	5	1		12
Chelsea	6	2			8
Sheffield Wednesday	4	5			9
Newcastle United	4	4			8
Wolverhampton Wanderers	3	4	3	1	11
Leeds United	3	5			8
Blackburn Rovers	3	1	1		5
Huddersfield Town	3	1		1	5
Burnley	2	4	1	1	8
Derby County	2	4	1		7
Preston North End	2	3	2	1	8
Tottenham Hotspur	2	2			4
Portsmouth	2	1	4	1	8
Leicester City	1	8	1		10
Ipswich Town	1	3	2		6
Nottingham Forest	1	3	1		5
West Bromwich Albion	1	3			4
Sheffield United	1	1	1	1	4
Norwich City		5	2		7
Birmingham City		4	2		6
Middlesbrough		4			4
Notts County		3	2	3	8
Fulham		3	2		5
Bolton Wanderers		3	1		4
Grimsby Town		2	3	1	6
Reading		2	3	1	6
Coventry City		2	3		5
Queens Park Rangers		2	2		4
Stoke City		2	2		4
Crystal Palace		2	1		3
West Ham United		2			2
Bristol City		1	5		6
Millwall		1	3	1	5
Charlton Athletic		1	3		4
Brentford		1	2	3	6
Luton Town		1	2	1	4
Bradford City		1	2		3
Bury		1	2		3
Oldham Athletic		1	2		3
Oxford United		1	2		3
Cardiff City		1	1	1	3
AFC Bournemouth		1	1		2
Blackpool		1			1
Plymouth Argyle			5	1	6
Doncaster Rovers			4	4	8
Lincoln City			4	2	6
Wigan Athletic			4	1	5
Hull City			4		4
Brighton & Hove Albion			3	2	5
Barnsley			3		3
Chesterfield			2	4	6
Stockport County			2	2	4
Leyton Orient			2	1	3
Port Vale			2	1	3
Rotherham United			2	1	3
Swansea City			2	1	3
Watford			2	1	3
Bristol Rovers			2		2
Southampton			2		2
Swindon Town			1	3	4
Carlisle United			1	2	3
Northampton Town			1	2	3
Darlington			1	1	2
Cambridge United			1	1	2
Mansfield Town			1	1	2
Shrewsbury Town			1	1	2
Southend United			1	1	2
Bradford Park Avenue			1		1
Hereford United			1		1
Nelson			1		1
Newport County			1		1
Scunthorpe United			1		1
Tranmere Rovers			1		1
Wrexham			1		1
Gillingham				2	2
Peterborough United				2	2
Walsall				2	2
Accrington Stanley				1	1
Bromley				1	1
Burton Albion				1	1
Cheltenham Town				1	1
Forest Green Rovers				1	1
Exeter City				1	1
Milton Keynes Dons				1	1
Rushden & Diamonds				1	1
Southport				1	1
Wimbledon				1	1
Yeovil Town				1	1
York City				1	1

== Play-offs ==
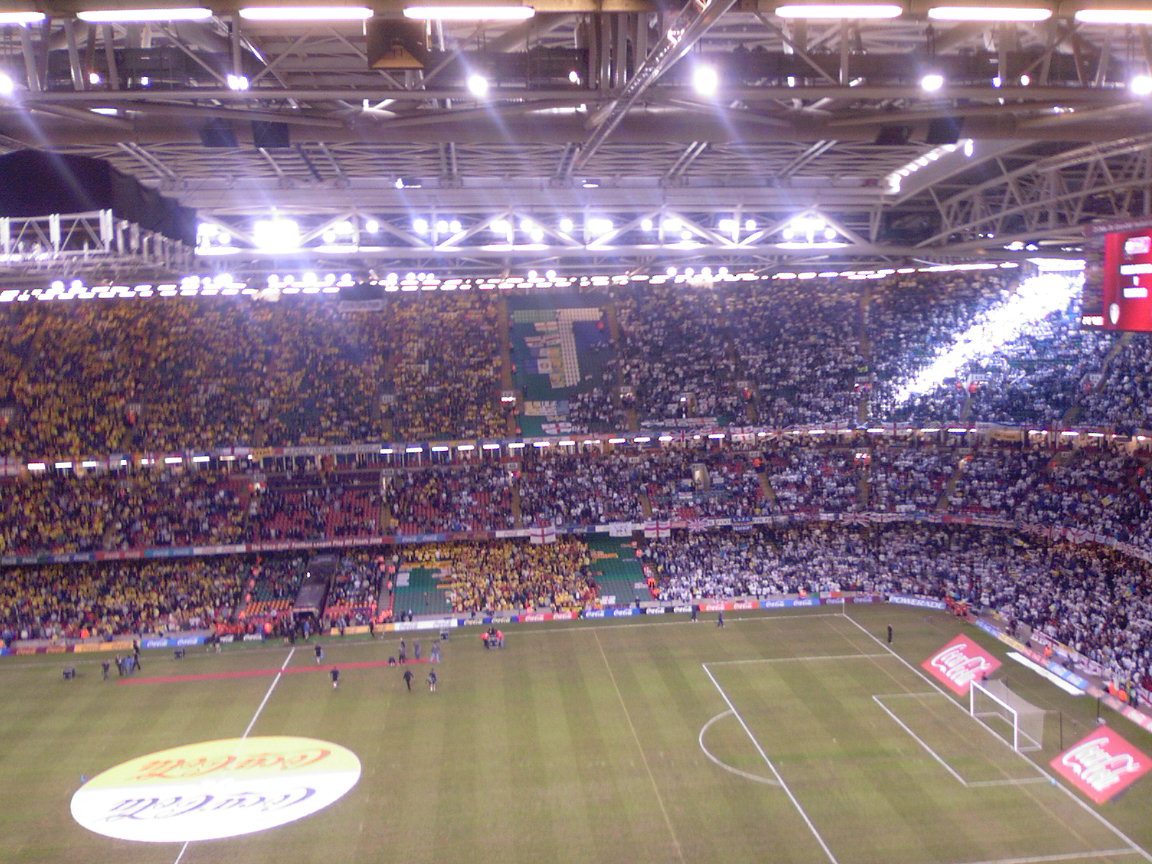
Championship Play-off final, 2006. (Leeds United v. Watford, Millennium Stadium)

The Football League play-offs are used as a means of determining the final promotion place from each of the league's three divisions. This is a way of keeping the possibility of promotion open for more clubs towards the end of the season.

The format was first introduced in 1987, after the decision was made to reduce the top flight from 22 to 20 clubs over the next two seasons; initially, the play-offs involved the team finishing immediately above the relegation places in a given division and the three teams who finished immediately below the promotion places in the division below – essentially one team was fighting to keep their place in the higher division while the other three teams were attempting to take it from them. In 1989, this was changed—instead of teams from different divisions playing each other, the four teams below the automatic promotion places contested the play-offs. The first season of this arrangement saw the final being contested in home and away legs. The four teams play-off in two semi-finals and a final, with the team winning the final being promoted. Originally the semi-finals and the final were all two-legged home-and-away affairs, but from 1990 onwards the final is a one-off match. It is in this format that the play-offs continue today. A proposal to have six teams rather than four competing for the final place was defeated at the league's AGM in 2003.

=== Play-off winners ===
Season	Second Division	Third Division	Fourth Division
1986–87	Charlton Athletic	Swindon Town	Aldershot
1987–88	Middlesbrough	Walsall	Swansea City
1988–89	Crystal Palace	Port Vale	Leyton Orient
1989–90	Swindon Town^{1}	Notts County	Cambridge United
1990–91	Notts County	Tranmere Rovers	Torquay United
1991–92	Blackburn Rovers	Peterborough United	Blackpool
Season	First Division	Second Division	Third Division
1992–93	Swindon Town	West Bromwich Albion	York City
1993–94	Leicester City	Burnley	Wycombe Wanderers
1994–95	Bolton Wanderers	Huddersfield Town	Chesterfield
1995–96	Leicester City	Bradford City	Plymouth Argyle
1996–97	Crystal Palace	Crewe Alexandra	Northampton Town
1997–98	Charlton Athletic	Grimsby Town	Colchester United
1998–99	Watford	Manchester City	Scunthorpe United
1999-00	Ipswich Town	Gillingham	Peterborough United
2000–01	Bolton Wanderers	Walsall	Blackpool
2001–02	Birmingham City	Stoke City	Cheltenham Town
2002–03	Wolverhampton Wanderers	Cardiff City	Bournemouth
2003–04	Crystal Palace	Brighton & Hove Albion	Huddersfield Town
Season	Championship	League One	League Two
2004–05	West Ham United	Sheffield Wednesday	Southend United
2005–06	Watford	Barnsley	Cheltenham Town
2006–07	Derby County	Blackpool	Bristol Rovers
2007–08	Hull City	Doncaster Rovers	Stockport County
2008–09	Burnley	Scunthorpe United	Gillingham
2009–10	Blackpool	Millwall	Dagenham & Redbridge
2010–11	Swansea City	Peterborough United	Stevenage
2011–12	West Ham United	Huddersfield Town	Crewe Alexandra
2012–13	Crystal Palace	Yeovil Town	Bradford City
2013–14	Queens Park Rangers	Rotherham United	Fleetwood Town
2014–15	Norwich City	Preston North End	Southend United
2015–16	Hull City	Barnsley	AFC Wimbledon
2016–17	Huddersfield Town	Millwall	Blackpool
2017–18	Fulham	Rotherham United	Coventry City
2018–19	Aston Villa	Charlton Athletic	Tranmere Rovers
2019–20	Fulham	Wycombe Wanderers	Northampton Town
2020–21	Brentford	Blackpool	Morecambe
2021–22	Nottingham Forest	Sunderland	Port Vale
2022–23	Luton Town	Sheffield Wednesday	Carlisle United
2023–24	Southampton	Oxford United	Crawley Town
2024–25	Sunderland	Charlton Athletic	AFC Wimbledon
2025–26	Hull City	Bolton Wanderers	Notts County

1: Due to financial irregularities, Swindon were prevented from taking their place in the First Division, which was awarded to the losing finalists, Sunderland.

== League sponsorship ==
Since 1983 the League has accepted lucrative sponsorships for its main competition. Below is a list of sponsors and the League's name under their sponsorship:

Years	Sponsor	Name
1983–1986	Canon	Canon League
1986–1987	Today	Today League
1987–1993	Barclays	Barclays League^{A}
1993–1996	Endsleigh	Endsleigh League
1996–2004	Nationwide	Nationwide Football League
2004–2010	Coca-Cola	Coca-Cola Football League
2010–2013	npower	npower Football League
2013–2016	Sky Bet	Sky Bet Football League
2016–2029	Sky Bet	Sky Bet EFL

- ^{A} Upon the breakaway of the First Division in 1992 to form the Premier League, Barclays became a secondary sponsor in the newly formed top division, becoming the primary sponsor from 2001 until 2016.

After the formation of the Premier League the newly slimmed-down football League (70 clubs until 1995 and 72 clubs since) renamed its divisions to reflect the changes. The old Second Division became the new First Division, the Third Division became the Second Division, and the Fourth Division became the Third Division. The financial health of its clubs had become perhaps the highest League priority due to the limited resources available. However, there were some promising signs for the future, as the League planned to announce new initiatives beginning with the 2004–05 season, coinciding with the start of a new sponsorship agreement with Coca-Cola. The first of these changes was a rebranding of the League with the renaming of the First Division as The Championship, the Second Division as League One and the Third Division as League Two. The League's cup competitions have had different sponsors. The current sponsor Sky Bet commissioned a suite of trophies for the league from silversmith Thomas Lyte.

== Media rights ==
=== United Kingdom and Ireland ===
==== Live matches ====
Matches broadcast in the United Kingdom and Ireland since 1996 (when Sky began to show live matches)
Seasons	Sky	BBC	Total
1996–2001	?		
2001–2002	Exclusively on ITV Digital		
2002–2009	?		
2009–2012	65	10	75
2012–2015	75	–	75
2015–2018	112	–	112
2019–2024	138	–	138
2024–2029	1,059	–	1,059

The other major source of revenue is television. The 1980s saw competition between terrestrial broadcasters for the rights to show League matches, but the arrival on the scene of satellite broadcaster British Sky Broadcasting (Sky TV), eagerly searching for attractive programming to build its customer base and willing to pay huge sums, changed the picture entirely. The League's top-tier clubs had been agitating for several years to be able to keep more of the League's revenue for themselves, threatening to break away and form their own league if necessary. In 1992 the threat was realised as the First Division clubs left to establish the FA Premier League and signed a contract for exclusive live coverage of their games with Sky TV. The FA Premier League agreed to maintain the promotion and relegation of three clubs with The Football League, but The League was now in a far weaker position – without its best clubs and without the clout to negotiate high-revenue TV deals. This problem was exacerbated with the collapse in 2002 of ITV Digital, holder of TV rights for The Football League, which cost League clubs millions of pounds in revenue.

In 2001 the league signed a £315 million deal with ITV Digital, but in March 2002 the broadcaster was put into administration by its parent companies when the league refused to accept a £130 million reduction in the deal. As a result, ITV Digital's parent companies Granada and Carlton both cut off the deal with the EFL and consequently, ITV Digital suffered the losses. In November 2007 the league announced a new domestic rights deal worth £264 million with Sky and the BBC for the three seasons from 2009 to 2012. It covers Football League, League Cup and Football League Trophy matches and the full range of media: terrestrial and pay television, broadband internet, video-on-demand and mobile services. The deal represents a 135% increase on the previous deal and works out at an average of more than £1.2 million per club per season, though some clubs will receive more than others. Sky will provide the majority of the coverage and the BBC broadcast 10 exclusively live matches from the Championship per season and the semi-finals and finals of the League Cup. In 2012, Sky Sports signed a new exclusive deal to broadcast all matches after the BBC pulled out of the deal owing the financial cuts that the BBC Sport department was going through. However the BBC signed a new deal to still broadcast The Football League Show highlights programme.

In May 2017, it was announced that Talksport had secured exclusive national radio rights to the English Football League. It gave them the ability to broadcast up to up 110 EFL fixtures a season. Many Football League matches are also broadcast to local audiences via BBC Local Radio stations or by commercial stations.

On 18 September 2008, the Football League unveiled a new Coca-Cola Football League podcast, hosted by BBC Radio 5 Live's Mark Clemmit to be released every Thursday. In the 2012–13 season the Podcast was renamed the npower football league show but still hosted by Mark Clemmit. Mark Clemmit continued to host the show as TradePoint came on board in the 2013–14 season to be the title sponsor of the newly re-branded 'Football League Radio'. The programme is now produced by digital production studio, Engage Sports Media.

In November 2018, Sky Sports announced a new five-year deal with EFL. Starting from the 2019–20 season, Sky would show 138 league matches per season, with an option to increase the number of matches to 158 in the final two years of the agreement.

On 6 May 2023, Sky Sports agreed a new five-year EFL deal from 2024–25 to 2028–29 for more than 1,000 matches, including 328 Championship, 248 League One, 248 League Two, all 15 play-off, all 93 Carabao Cup and all 127 EFL Trophy matches respectively. Sky Sports also took over iFollow (EFL's streaming service) and replaced with Sky Sports + which also replaced the red button service.

==== Highlights ====
Highlights programme	Duration	Broadcaster
Football League Extra	1994–95 to 2003–04	ITV
The Championship*	2004–05 to 2008–09	ITV
The Football League Show	2009–10 to 2014–15	BBC One
Football League Tonight**	2015–16 to 2017–18	Channel 5
EFL on Quest	2018–19 to 2021–22	Quest
English Football League Highlights	2022–	ITV4

*Between January 2008 to May 2008, the programme was renamed Championship Goals.

**The programme was split into two shows part way through the 2015/16 season, and renamed 'The Championship' for Championship highlights, and 'Goal Rush' for League One and League Two highlights.

=== International broadcasters ===
Source: England Football League website as of November 8, 2025.

==== Europe ====
Country	Broadcaster
Albania	SuperSport
Armenia	Fast Sports
Austria	Sky Sport
Azerbaijan	Setanta Sports
Bosnia and Herzegovina	Arena Sport
Bulgaria	Nova Sport
Croatia	Arena Sport
Czech Republic	Nova Sport
Denmark	Viaplay
Estonia	Setanta Sports
Finland	Viaplay
France¹	beIN Sports
Georgia	Setanta Sports
Germany	Sky Sport
Greece	Cosmote Sport
Hungary	Network 4
Iceland	Viaplay
Israel²	Charlton
Italy	Como TV
Kosovo	SuperSport, Arena Sport
Latvia	Setanta Sports
Liechtenstein	Sky Sport
Lithuania	Setanta Sports
Luxembourg	Sky Sport
Malta	Total Sports Network
Moldova	Setanta Sports
Montenegro	Arena Sport
Netherlands	Viaplay
North Macedonia	Arena Sport
Norway	Viaplay
Poland	TVP
Portugal	Sport TV
Russia	Futbol TV
San Marino	Como TV
Serbia	Arena Sport
Slovakia	Nova Sport
Slovenia	Arena Sport
Sweden	Viaplay
Switzerland	Sky Sport
Turkey	Exxen
Ukraine	Setanta Sports

¹ Broadcast area in France includes viewers in Monaco, Reunion, Andorra, French Polynesia, Mayotte, New Caledonia
² Israel is listed by the EFL as part of their European broadcast partners even though technically it is in Asia.

==== Sub-Saharan Africa ====
Country	Broadcaster
Angola	Supersport, ESPN Africa
Benin	Supersport, ESPN Africa
Botswana	Supersport, ESPN Africa
Burkina Faso	Supersport, ESPN Africa
Burundi	Supersport, ESPN Africa
Cameroon	Supersport, ESPN Africa
Cape Verde	Supersport, ESPN Africa
Central African Republic	Supersport, ESPN Africa
Chad	Supersport, ESPN Africa, BeIN Sports
Comoros	Supersport, ESPN Africa
Congo	Supersport, ESPN Africa
Democratic Republic of the Congo	Supersport, ESPN Africa
Djibouti	ESPN Africa, BeIN Sports
Equatorial Guinea	Supersport, ESPN Africa
Eritrea	Supersport, ESPN Africa
Eswatini	Supersport, ESPN Africa
Ethiopia	Supersport, ESPN Africa
Gabon	Supersport, ESPN Africa
Gambia	Supersport, ESPN Africa
Ghana	Supersport, ESPN Africa, Sporty TV
Guinea	Supersport, ESPN Africa
Guinea Bissau	Supersport, ESPN Africa
Ivory Coast	Supersport, ESPN Africa
Kenya	Supersport, ESPN Africa, Sporty TV
Lesotho	Supersport, ESPN Africa
Liberia	Supersport, ESPN Africa
Madagascar	Supersport, ESPN Africa
Malawi	Supersport, ESPN Africa
Mali	Supersport, ESPN Africa
Mauritania	Supersport, ESPN Africa, BeIN Sports
Mauritius	Supersport, ESPN Africa
Mozambique	Supersport, ESPN Africa
Namibia	Supersport, ESPN Africa
Niger	Supersport, ESPN Africa
Nigeria	Supersport, ESPN Africa, Sporty TV
Rwanda	Supersport, ESPN Africa
Sao Tome & Principe	Supersport, ESPN Africa
Senegal	Supersport, ESPN Africa
Seychelles	Supersport, ESPN Africa
Sierra Leone	Supersport, ESPN Africa
Somalia	Supersport, ESPN Africa, BeIN Sports
South Africa	SuperSport, ESPN Africa Sporty TV
South Sudan	Supersport, ESPN Africa, BeIN Sports
Sudan	Supersport, ESPN Africa, BeIN Sports
Tanzania	Supersport, ESPN Africa
Togo	Supersport, ESPN Africa
Uganda	Supersport, ESPN Africa
Zambia	Supersport, ESPN Africa
Zimbabwe	Supersport, ESPN Africa

==== Asia ====
Country	Broadcaster
Afghanistan	FanCode
Bangladesh	FanCode
Bhutan	FanCode
Central Asia	Setanta Sports
China	Douyin
Hong Kong	TVB
India	FanCode
Indonesia	IEG
Japan	DAZN
Malaysia	Astro Sports
Maldives	FanCode
Nepal	FanCode
Pakistan	Myco
Singapore	Singtel
South Korea	Coupang
Sri Lanka	FanCode
Thailand	Monomax

==== North America and Caribbean ====
Country	Broadcaster
Anguilla	ESPN/Disney+
Antigua and Barbuda	ESPN/Disney+
Aruba	ESPN/Disney+
Bahamas	ESPN/Disney+
Barbados	ESPN/Disney+
Belize	ESPN/Disney+
Bermuda	ESPN/Disney+
Bonaire	ESPN/Disney+
British Virgin Islands	ESPN/Disney+
Canada	DAZN
Cayman Islands	ESPN/Disney+
Curacao	ESPN/Disney+
Dominica	ESPN/Disney+
Grenada	ESPN/Disney+
Guadeloupe	ESPN/Disney+
Guyana	ESPN/Disney+
Haiti	ESPN/Disney+
Jamaica	ESPN/Disney+
Martinique	ESPN/Disney+
Montserrat	ESPN/Disney+
Saba	ESPN/Disney+
Saint Barthélemy	ESPN/Disney+
Saint Kitts and Nevis	ESPN/Disney+
Saint Lucia	ESPN/Disney+
Saint Vincent and the Grenadines	ESPN/Disney+
Sint Eustatius	ESPN/Disney+
Sint Maarten	ESPN/Disney+
Suriname	ESPN/Disney+
Trinidad and Tobago	ESPN/Disney+
Turks and Caicos Islands	ESPN/Disney+
United States	CBS / Paramount+ / Golazo / AFN Sports¹

¹ EFL matches are broadcast live or delayed by videotape to authorised United States military personnel stationed overseas using the AFN Go mobile app or a AFN satellite television decoder.

==== Central, South America and Mexico ====
Country	Broadcaster
Argentina	ESPN/Disney+
Bolivia	ESPN/Disney+
Brazil	ESPN/Disney+
Chile	ESPN/Disney+
Colombia	ESPN/Disney+
Costa Rica	ESPN/Disney+
Dominican Republic	ESPN/Disney+
Ecuador	ESPN/Disney+
El Salvador	ESPN/Disney+
Guatemala	ESPN/Disney+
Honduras	ESPN/Disney+
Mexico	ESPN/Disney+
Nicaragua	ESPN/Disney+
Panama	ESPN/Disney+
Paraguay	ESPN/Disney+
Peru	ESPN/Disney+
Uruguay	ESPN/Disney+
Venezuela	ESPN/Disney+

==== Middle East and North Africa ====
Country	Broadcaster
Algeria	BeIN Sports
Bahrain	BeIN Sports
Egypt	BeIN Sports
Iran	BeIN Sports
Iraq	BeIN Sports
Jordan	BeIN Sports
Kuwait	BeIN Sports
Lebanon	BeIN Sports
Libya	BeIN Sports
Morocco	BeIN Sports
Oman	BeIN Sports
Qatar	BeIN Sports
Palestine	BeIN Sports
Saudi Arabia	BeIN Sports
Syria	BeIN Sports
Tunisia	BeIN Sports
United Arab Emirates	BeIN Sports
Yemen	BeIN Sports

==== Oceania ====
Country	Broadcaster
Australia	BeIN Sports
New Zealand	BeIN Sports

=== Online Streaming ===
Country	Broadcaster
United Kingdom	Sky Sports Streaming App and OTT (Over-The-Top) app
Worldwide	EFL iFollow Streaming App and OTT (Over-The-Top) app

== Governance and management ==
The EFL operates as a limited company with the 72 member clubs acting as shareholders. Its revenue for the financial year ending July 2022 was £190.8 million, the majority of which was derived from broadcasting revenues.

=== Board ===
The EFL board of directors is responsible for providing the organisation's strategic direction.

The board consists of ten directors, six of whom are divisional representatives elected by Member Clubs. The divisional representatives include three directors from Championship Clubs, two from League One Clubs and one from a League Two Club. The remaining four directors are made up of two independent non-executive directors, an independent chair and the chief executive officer of the EFL.

Current members are:

- Rick Parry – Chairman
- Trevor Birch – Chief Executive
- Zoe Webber
- Liam Scully
- Julian Tagg
- Charles Grant
- Peter Ridsdale
- Neil Bausor
- Caroline Artis
- Justine Roberts CBE

=== Senior management ===
- Nick Craig – Chief Operating Officer

=== Former presidents ===
- William McGregor 1892–1894
- John Bentley 1894–1910
- John McKenna 1910–1936
- Charles Sutcliffe 1936–1939
- Will Cuff 1939–1949
- Arthur Drewry 1949–1955
- Arthur Oakley 1955–1957
- Joe Richards 1957–1966
- Len Shipman 1966–1974
- Lord Westwood 1974–1981
- Jack Dunnett 1981–1986
- Philip Carter 1986–1988
- Bill Fox 1988–1991

== Arms ==
Coat of arms of English Football League
Adopted 25 March 1974 Crest On a grassy mount a football surmounted by a swift volant all proper. Escutcheon Argent on a cross gules a lion passant guardant between two lions' faces in pale or. Motto VIS UNITA FORTIOR (Strength United is Stronger)

== See also ==
- Football DataCo
- Football League 100 Legends
- Football League Awards
- List of English football championship winning managers
- List of English Football League managers by date of appointment
- List of sports attendance figures
- Premier League–Football League gulf

== Notes ==
1. League One, Two and select under 21 teams from Premier League and Championship clubs
2. FA Cup or League Cup winners
