= Quest (British TV channel) =

British and Irish television channel

- Logo used since 13 January 2026
- Country: United Kingdom, Ireland

Programming
- Picture format: 1080i HDTV (downscaled to 16:9 576i for the SDTV feed)
- Timeshift service: Quest +1

Ownership
- Owner: Skydance Corporation
- Parent: Skydance UK
- Sister channels: Quest Red

History
- Launched: 30 September 2009; 17 years ago
- Replaced: DMAX +1.5 (Quest +1)

Links
- Website: www.discoveryplus.co.uk/channel/quest

Availability

Terrestrial
- Freeview: Channel 17; Channel 70 (+1)

Streaming media
- Discovery+: Watch live (UK only)
- Virgin TV Go: Watch live (UK only); Watch live (+1) (UK only)
- Virgin TV Anywhere: Watch live (Ireland only)

Quest is a British and Irish free-to-air television channel available in the United Kingdom and Ireland. It provides factual, lifestyle and entertainment programmes and other imported material, as well as films and sports coverage. It is operated by Skydance Corporation under its UK division.

== History ==
=== Launch ===
In October 2008, Discovery announced that they would launch a channel on Freeview in early 2009, but without using the "Discovery" name. A placeholder appeared on Freeview channel 47 on 5 January 2009 and Tiscali TV channel 109 on 14 May 2009. Although the channel planned to launch on 14 May 2009 at 10 am, after broadcasting a promo loop on the planned launch morning, at 10 am the channel returned to displaying a "Coming soon" message.

The Quest website displayed a message reading: "Regrettably we have made the decision to postpone the launch of Quest. Due to a number of commercial factors we have had to make this difficult decision. We did not make this decision lightly and we are working towards launching Quest in the near future. We would like to apologise wholeheartedly to any of you that have been looking forward to this launch."

In August 2009, Discovery Networks announced that it planned to launch the channel on 30 September 2009. At the same time the channel moved to channel 38. Quest launched on Sky, on 1 October 2009, after acquiring an EPG slot from Information TV 2. Quest +1 launched on Sky, replacing DMAX +1.5 on 2 November 2009.

Quest launched on Virgin Media on 25 March 2010 on channel 179.

Quest moved to channel 12 on Freeview, a space previously occupied by Dave, due to its owner Discovery, Inc. acquiring Good Food, Home and Really from the UKTV network (which owns U&Dave) as part of a deal with BBC Studios.

Quest HD has been available on Swisscom TV (IPTV) in Switzerland since November 2019.

In November 2022, Quest Red +1 closed on Freeview, and Quest moved from the COM4/SDN multiplex to the COM6/ArqB multiplex, but the timeshift service of Quest Red was removed from the Freeview EPG on 14 December 2022.

=== Full-time ===
On 15 October 2010, Quest began broadcasting a 24-hour schedule on all platforms except Freeview. On 30 June 2011, Gems TV acquired a 24-hour Freeview slot, ending their timeshare with Quest, allowing Quest to begin broadcasting for 24 hours a day on Freeview as well.

=== Quest +1 on Freeview ===
At the beginning of March 2014, Quest +1 appeared on Freeview channel 57. On 27 May 2014, Quest moved on Freeview to channel 37 and Quest +1 moved to channel 38. On 15 March 2017 it moved to channel 92 due to the launch of sister channel Quest Red, and later channels 76 and 69 following closures. Quest +1 and Quest Red +1 received changes in 2019 as Quest Red +1 moved to 72 while Quest +1 increased broadcast hours to 24 hour rather than 7pm to 7am.

=== Programming ===
==== Sports coverage ====
On 21 July 2014, Quest announced that they would be broadcasting live football in the form of the 2014 Schalke 04 Cup - a pre-season tournament featuring the likes of Newcastle United F.C. and West Ham United F.C. Five months later the channel broadcast live coverage of the Dubai Challenge Cup.

Speedway highlights are also shown on Quest.

Since 2016, Quest has shown coverage of the British Superbike Championship live, free-to-air. Originally, it was to avoid a clash with other events being shown on Eurosport's normal broadcast channels, but subsequently the event has regularly been shown on the channel either live or by highlights.

In late 2016, Quest broadcast live coverage and highlights of the new Home Series International Snooker Series, Quest broadcast afternoon sessions live of the English, Scottish and Northern Irish Opens with evening coverage exclusively on Eurosport and highlights. Both Eurosport and Quest cover the final sessions of each tournament live. The coverage is presented by Andy Goldstein or Colin Murray, alongside Jimmy White, Neal Foulds and Ronnie O'Sullivan, with commentary by the usual Eurosport commentators Joe Johnson, Neal Foulds, Dave Hendon and Philip Studd.

In 2019 and 2020, Quest showed live coverage and highlights of the BDO World Darts Championship, BDO World Trophy and the World Masters. Quest shared coverage with sister channel Eurosport.

Quest also shows parts of the 24 Hours of Le Mans each year along with its sister channels Eurosport 1 and Eurosport 2. It broadcast highlights of the MotoGP World Championship along with Moto2 and Moto3 beginning in 2019 and 2020.

===== English Football League (EFL) =====
Kicking-off from the 2018–19 season, the four-year deal will see Quest provide 90 minutes of extensive match highlights of the English Championship, League One and League Two, hosted by Colin Murray, in primetime at 9pm every Saturday night. As a result, the channel announced an HD version would launch in July 2018. It launched on 21 July 2018 on Virgin Media channel 217 but was removed on 24 July 2018. It officially launched on 2 August 2018 on Virgin Media, on 3 August on Freesat and Sky, and on 14 August on Freeview.

The EFL said in its news release on 4 May 2018 that "the partnership between the EFL and Quest will guarantee accessible high quality, free-to-air coverage for football fans across the country". When the first show was broadcast on 4 August 2018, viewers experienced frequent breakup of picture and the screen aspect was reduced to the obsolete 4:3 ratio. Numerous complaints were made and Digital Spy ran a feature on the impact of the "technical difficulties". Quest claimed that "some" viewers experienced problems but the Digital Spy investigation strongly suggests that everyone was impacted. Quest added that they were working to resolve the issue.

==== Movies ====
On 25 May 2023, Quest began broadcasting movies. Action thrillers are broadcast Thursdays at 10 pm and repeated on Sundays at 11 pm, and westerns are shown Saturdays at 2 pm and repeated on Sundays at 6 am. They are mainly sourced from the Warner Bros. film libraries. The broadcasting of movies on Quest began after it was decided, and announced, that sister channel TCM Movies would close; TCM stopped broadcasting on 7 July 2023.

==== Sky channel moves ====
On 17 October 2013, Quest moved from 154 to 167 on Sky, while TLC +1 moved from 195 to 154, and Quest +1 moved from 167 to 195.

On 16 July 2015, Quest moved from 167 to 144 on Sky, switching places with sister channel DMAX.

Quest and Quest Red removed their encryption and began broadcasting free-to-air on satellite in June 2017, and were added to the Freesat guide early in July.

As part of the major EPG reshuffle on 1 May 2018, Quest +1 moved from channel 195 to 244 (due to Quest not moving from channel 144).

== Logos ==
Quest logo used from 30 September 2009 - 14 April 2014

Quest logo used from 15 April 2014 – 12 January 2026

2014 version without checkpoint used from 5 July 2018 – 12 January 2026

Quest logo used since 13 January 2026

== See also ==
- EFL on Quest
- The FBI Files
- Fishing in the Footsteps of Mr. Crabtree
- Forensic Detectives
- Quest Arabiya
- Quest Red
- Salvage Hunters
