= I Love My Country =

I Love My Country may refer to:

- I Love My Country (franchise), an international television program franchise
  - I Love My Country (game show), the UK version
  - Ik hou van Holland, the original Dutch version
- "I Love My Country" (Lioness), a 2024 television episode
- "I Love My Country" (song), by Florida Georgia Line, 2020
