= Des Kelly =

British journalist and broadcaster (born 1965)

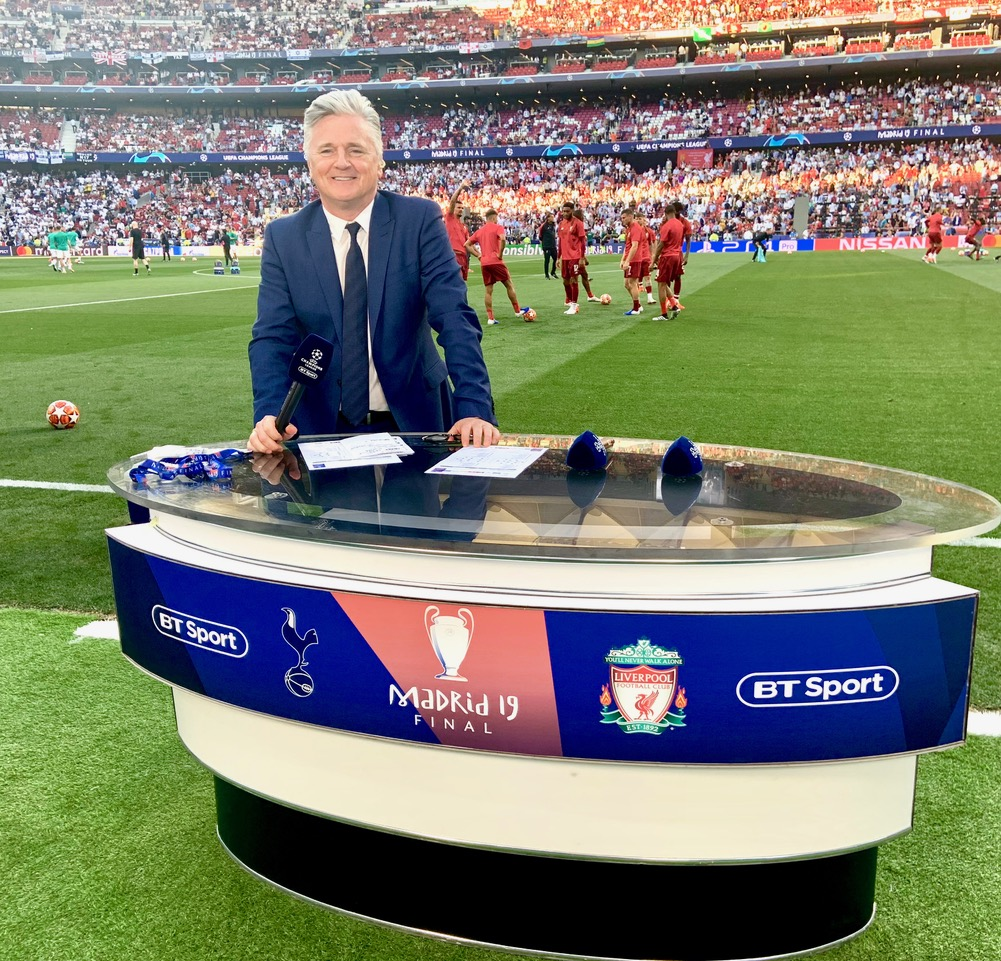
- Kelly presents pitchside at the 2019 UEFA Champions League Final
- Born: Desmond Kelly; 19 February 1965 (age 61)
- Occupations: Journalist, broadcaster

Desmond Kelly (born 19 February 1965) is a British journalist and broadcaster.

Kelly was the chief reporter and interviewer for British broadcaster BT Sport for a decade. He was part of the live broadcast team mainly for the channel's Champions League and Premier League coverage. He was nominated as SJA Broadcast Journalist of the Year for 2015, 2016, 2017, 2018, 2019, 2021 and 2022 - and highly commended in 2017 and 2018.

Kelly presented 136 editions of Life's A Pitch with Des Kelly, a live, late-night sport/entertainment show on BT Sport. It was rebranded Follow the Football with Des Kelly for the new season in 2014. Kelly was also executive producer of the programme, which originally launched on 5 August 2013 and was nominated for SJA Television Show of the Year in 2013. Kelly simultaneously presented SportsHUB, BT Sport's sports news programme, from Monday to Thursday, until the show closed in 2015. He left when BT Sport transitioned to TNT Sports.

Kelly was a long-standing presenter on Talksport, the commercial national radio station which broadcasts from London across the United Kingdom. He is the former host of The Press Pass, a show introduced on the first weekend of the Premier League season in August 2011. It was twice nominated as SJA Sports Radio Programme of the Year in 2011 and 2012. Kelly quit in August 2014 to concentrate on his BT commitments, but is still an occasional contributor.

== Journalism ==
A winner of the SJA Sports Columnist of the Year award, Kelly was nominated as UK Press Gazette Sports Writer of the Year and commended on four occasions by the Sports Journalists' Association for his articles.

In 2012 Kelly was named among the top 10 most influential sportswriters in Britain by the trade publication, UK Press Gazette.

Kelly was a sports columnist on the Daily Mail for nearly a decade, having joined the paper in 2004.

Previously, Kelly was the Acting Editor and Deputy Editor of the Daily Mirror. Kelly replaced Piers Morgan after he was sacked for publishing faked photos of Iraqi prisoners being "tortured" by British troops and edited the paper in the wake of that controversy. Kelly was also forced out of the Mirror later in 2004 when Richard Wallace was handed the position.

A contributor to Sky News and BBC Breakfast, he is also a regular member of the BBC Radio 5 Live Fighting Talk panel show and has appeared on Sportsweek and the BBC Radio 4 Today programme. He is a former assistant editor and head of sport of the Daily Express, football editor of the Sunday Express, and the chief sports reporter of the now defunct Today newspaper. He was previously a columnist for The Sunday Times and had a column in the London Evening Standard. He has also written for GQ, German newspaper Bild and L'Équipe in France.

== Broadcasting ==
Kelly was part of the BBC1's Inside Sport presenting team, which was hosted by Gabby Logan between 2007 and 2009. His contributions included interviews with Michael Schumacher, Arsène Wenger, Petr Čech and a piece on GB Blind Football.

He has made television appearances on the BBC's Match of the Day 2 and was the first journalist to appear as a pundit on either show. He has also guested on Channel 4's Clive Anderson's Sports Talk Show, Sky Sports' Hold the Back Page show and one of his first assignments was to provide live reports for Sky News from England's 3–0 win over Poland in 1989. He has been a contributor to a number of programmes, including BBC's The Noughties... Was That It? and Britain's Most Annoying People as well as GMTV and others.

== Outside journalism ==
Kelly is patron of the Great Britain Blind Football team and opened the new Royal National College for the Blind Paralympic Centre in Hereford. He was also a member of the Jaguar Sports Academy and on the judging panel for the Laureus World Sports Awards.

Kelly has also been an Executive Consultant for the PR agency Hill & Knowlton and director of the internet company Fast Web Media. At Hill and Knowlton he was Master of Ceremonies at various corporate nights involving supermodels Jerry Hall and Petra Nemcova at the Cannes Festival; the football manager Arsène Wenger in Switzerland, the BBC Match of the Day team, Cilla Black, chef Antony Worrall Thompson, the cricketers Nasser Hussein and Jeff Thomson and footballer Marcel Desailly.

He has completed two London Marathons, the Network Q Rally of Great Britain twice, the Arctic Rally three times, the Belgium Bianchi Rally and others. He took part in the world's first two-seater F1 race with Fernando Alonso at Donington Park. He completed in the 2007 Isle of Wight Round The Island race on board an Extreme 40 sailing boat, made a solo parachute jump for MENCAP, has run with the bulls in Pamplona and climbed Kilimanjaro as part of a Football League team raising funds for Marie Curie Cancer Care in the summer of 2011.

== Personal ==
Kelly lives in Bristol. Born in London of an Irish family, he was educated at Wimbledon College and has a University of Surrey BA (Hons) in English and History from Froebel College in Roehampton, London. He is married to Paulina. Their engagement was announced in The Times on 26 December 2014. They married on 13 June 2015 in the Bristol Planetarium.

== TV and filmography ==
Year	Show	Role	Channel	Notes
2014 - 2023	Live football Premier League & Champions League coverage	Chief reporter & interviewer	BT Sport	
2013 - 2014	Life’s A Pitch with Des Kelly	Presenter	BT Sport	136 episodes
2014	Follow The Football with Des Kelly	Presenter	BT Sport	6 episodes
2013 - 2014	Transfer Deadline Day	Presenter	BT Sport	
2013	Football Tonight	Presenter	BT Sport	
2013	SportsHUB	Presenter	BT Sport	
2013	Arctic Lapland Rally documentary		Sky News	
2012	Olympics Most Amazing Moments	contributor	BBC Three	
2011 - 2013	Murnaghan	regular guest	Sky News	
2010 - 2013	Daybreak	regular contributor	ITV	
2009	The Noughties review	contributor	BBC2	
2008	Britain’s Most Annoying People		BBC2	
2009 - 2013	Saturday Sport	regular contributor	Sky News	
2007 - 2008	Inside Sport	Co-Presenter	BBC1	Series 1 and 2
2005 - 2012	Sunrise	regular contributor	Sky News	
2004 - 2013	The Press Preview	regular contributor	Sky News	
2004 - 2010	GMTV	regular guest	ITV	
2001	Clive Anderson’s Sports Talk Show	contributor	Channel 4	
2000 - 2004	Hold The Back Page	multiple contributor	Sky Sports	
1996 - 2012	BBC News	multiple guest apps		
1999	England v Poland Live		Sky Sports	
