= Reuben Logan =

British rugby union player (born 2005)

- Born: Reuben McKerrow Logan; 28 July 2005 (age 21)
- Height: 1.96 m (6 ft 5 in)
- Weight: 115 kg (18.1 st; 254 lb)
- School: Shiplake College, Berkhamsted School
- Notable relative(s): Kenny Logan (father), Gabby Logan (mother), Terry Yorath (grandfather)

Rugby union career
- Position: Flanker
Senior career
Years	Team	Apps	(Points)
–2023	Wasps RFC		
2023–	Northampton Saints		
2025	→ Cambridge (loan)		
2025-	Sale Sharks		
2025-	→ Caldy (loan)		
International career
Years	Team	Apps	(Points)
2023–24	England U18	5	
2023–24	England U20		
2025–	Scotland U20	10	

Reuben McKerrow Logan (born 28 July 2005) is a professional rugby union player who plays for Sale Sharks. He is the son of Scottish former rugby international Kenny Logan and television presenter Gabby Logan, and grandson of former Wales footballer and manager Terry Yorath.

== Early life ==
He attended Shiplake College before moving to Berkhamsted School. With Berkhamsted he won the Daily Mail Schools' Trophy in the 2021-22 season. He was a back but transitioned into a back row forward.

== Career ==
He was in the academy of Wasps RFC. He signed a professional contract with Northampton Saints in March 2023. Northampton announced he would be in the intake for the senior academy squad for the 2023-24 season. He made his senior debut for Northampton in the Premiership Rugby Cup in September 2023. He was named in the Northampton starting XV for the first time for their fixture against Nottingham R.F.C. in the Premiership Rugby Cup on 9 November 2024. He played on loan at RFU Championship side Cambridge during the 2024-25 season.

In April 2025, it was announced that he would join Sale Sharks at the start of the 2025-26 season.

=== International career ===
Logan was called up to the England under-18 rugby team in March 2023 and played 5 matches. In October 2023 he was named in a 32 man England under-20 rugby union squad for the 2023-24 season.

In January 2025, he was named in Scotland U20 squad for the 2025 U20 Six Nations Championship. Making his debut in the opening fixture against Italy U20 at the Hive Stadium in Edinburgh.

== Personal life ==
He is the son of Scottish former rugby international Kenny Logan and television presenter and former international gymnast Gabby Logan, and grandson of former Wales football manager Terry Yorath. He has a twin sister called Lois, and grew up with his family in Buckinghamshire.
