= Reshmin Chowdhury =

British sports journalist broadcaster (born 1977)

- Born: 16 December 1977 (age 48); London, England
- Education: Woodford County High School for Girls; University of Bath
- Occupations: Sports journalist, broadcaster, singer
- Years active: 2000–present
- Employer(s): BBC, TNT Sports, Talksport

Reshmin Chowdhury (born 16 December 1977) is a British sports journalist broadcaster and event host. She currently lead presents live Premier League football on Talksport every Saturday morning in GameDay Exclusive. She presents live coverage of the Women's Super League and major women's football tournaments for BBC Sport. She has worked across all football coverage with BT Sport for 9 years, including most notably the UEFA Champions League, UEFA Europa League the FA Cup and the UEFA Europa Conference League. She recently fronted the FIFA World Cup in Qatar for BeIN Sports, the Tokyo 2020 Olympic and Beijing 2022 Winter Olympic Games with Eurosport and Discovery Plus, and presented for ITV Sport during UEFA Euro 2020.

== Early life ==
Chowdhury was born and brought up in London, England and is of Bangladeshi origin. Chowdhury described her childhood as growing up "in an extremely open-minded, progressive Bengali Muslim family and within a huge second-generation community where education, culture, religion and music were the cornerstones of my upbringing."

Chowdhury attended Woodford County High School for Girls. In 2000, she graduated with a 2.1 BSc (Hons) in Politics with Economics from the University of Bath. In 2003, she studied for an NCTJ Post-Graduate Diploma in Newspaper Journalism at Harlow College.

== Broadcasting career ==
Chowdhury spent her university placement year as a TV News Helpdesk Operator at Reuters TV News. Early roles included travelling to Borneo for the ITV1 programme Survivor, UK Editor of global online events guide whatsonwhen.com and producing specialist business reports for various international print media. She worked in Madagascar, Dubai, Greece, South Africa, Maldives and Nigeria.

In 2005, Chowdhury moved to television news and joined ITN as a news assistant and producer on the main news bulletins, before producing digital and online news for ITN ON. She was a producer and had a few stints as weekend reporter with BBC London before moving to BBC News and Bloomberg Television.

From September 2008, she spent two seasons as a presenter with Real Madrid TV. She was the first journalist to interview Cristiano Ronaldo following his then world-record signing for Real Madrid. She also secured the world exclusive with Karim Benzema, whom she interviewed in French.

Chowdhury has been part of the BBC Sport team since May 2010. She was a sports presenter for the BBC News Channel in the UK and BBC World. Also Match of the Day 2 - Stand-in Presenter; 2018 FIFA World Cup – Live match Presenter in Salford; 2018 & 2019 Wimbledon Championships – Reporter; FA Women's Super League and The Women's Football Show – Presenter; 2017 FIFA U-17 World Cup Final – Presenter; FA Cup – Reporter; Football Focus – Reporter; 2016 Summer Paralympics – Reporter (BBC Radio 5 Live); London 2012 Olympics – Presenter (BBC World).

In August 2014, Chowdhury joined the BT Sport team as presenter of their nightly news round-up show SportsHUB.

Reshmin currently presents BT Sport’s coverage of the UEFA Europa League and UEFA Europa Conference League and has presented across the FA Cup, the UEFA Women's Champions League and the FA Women’s Super League. She has been a lead reporter on BT Sport's coverage of the UEFA Champions League, working in multiple languages, plus the BDO World Darts Championship.

Chowdhury hosted live coverage of group games for BBC Sport during the 2018 FIFA World Cup as well as a daily show for Yahoo Sports in the UK.

In August 2019, Chowdhury became the lead Presenter of the newly launched GameDay Exclusive every Saturday, hosting live Premier League football on Talksport.

In the summer of 2021, she was one of the main anchors for the coverage of the 2020 Summer Olympics in Tokyo on streaming provider Discovery+ and Eurosport. She returned to host the Winter Olympics Beijing 2022.

In April 2022, Reshmin presented the FIFA World Cup Draw Qatar 2022 in Doha alongside Idris Elba.

She has co-presented the UEFA Champions League Group stage draw to a global audience for four consecutive years from 2017 to 2020.

She co-presented The Best FIFA Football Awards 2020 alongside Ruud Gullit and 2021 along with Jermaine Jenas.

She twice co-hosted the BT Sport Industry Awards and many other ceremonies and events.

In 2022, she presented on the English language BeIN Sports channels for the FIFA World Cup in the MENA region.

== Singing career ==
Chowdhury spent much of her extra-curricular time as a vocalist. She has worked alongside musician Nitin Sawhney. She was the lead singer in the UK touring theatre production of The Mahabharata and recorded vocals on the 2006 film The Namesake.

== Awards and nominations ==
In November 2013, Chowdhury was nominated for the Media Award sponsored by FC Business Magazine at the Asian Football Awards. In November 2015, she won the Media Award at the Asian Football Awards.

== See also ==
- British Bangladeshi
- List of British Bangladeshis
