= St John's Catholic School for the Deaf =

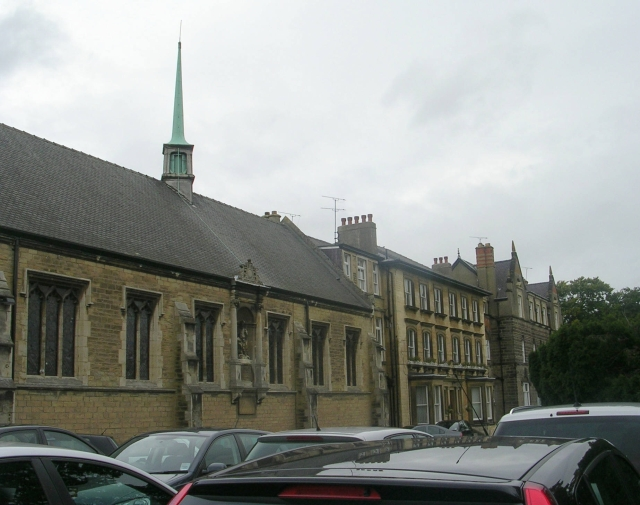

Location
- Church Street; Boston Spa, Wetherby, West Yorkshire, LS23 6DF; England; 53°53′58″N 1°21′06″W

Information
- Type: Non-maintained special school; SEN Specialism Sensory and/or Physical Needs
- Religious affiliation: Catholic
- Established: 1870
- Founder: Désiré de Haerne
- Local authority: Leeds
- Department for Education URN: 108120 Tables
- Ofsted: Reports
- Head teacher: Ann Bradbury
- Staff: 25 teachers, 11 learning support assistants, 22 care staff and others
- Gender: mixed
- Age: 3 to 19
- Enrolment: 84
- Website: www.stjohns.org.uk

St John's Catholic School for the Deaf is a school for deaf and hearing impaired children in Boston Spa, Wetherby, West Yorkshire, England. Monsignor de Haerne, an influential Belgian priest and senator founded the School at a small house in Handsworth in 1870 with the help from the Daughters of Charity of St. Vincent de Paul. The School was relocated to Boston Spa in 1875. With efforts from the Daughters of Charity, the School has had a Vincentian Family ethos for almost a century and a half.

St John's Catholic School for the Deaf is referred to as "Boston Spa" in British Sign Language. Many past pupils are leaders, educators, teachers and businessmen in the Deaf Community.

St John's School provides a day and boarding education for deaf and hard of hearing children and young people. In the primary department, teachers use the Maternal Reflective Method of English language teaching, pioneered by Father van Uden, a Dutch oralist based at the Institution for the Deaf in Sint Michielsgestel. In the Post-16 section, young people are provided with note-takers to support them when they attend local colleges, in particular York College and Askham Bryan College.

In 2008 compensation was awarded to seven men who were victims of a paedophile priest employed at the school between 1975 and 1980.

Gabby Logan (the school's patron) presented a BBC Radio 4 Appeal on Easter Sunday 2009 to raise funds for an Expressive Arts Resource (EAR). The new drama studio was officially opened in October 2012 by Monsignor John Wilson of the Diocese of Leeds.

== Name ==
While the School's official name is St John's Catholic School for the Deaf, it is referred to by the past pupils and the deaf community as "Boston Spa", the village where the School is situated, and as it is easier to lipread.

== Belgian Sign Language ==
Boston Spa was the only school in England that used a sign language other than British Sign Language, namely Belgian Sign Language introduced from Brussels by the two Daughters of Charity. St Vincent's School for the Deaf (Tollcross) in Glasgow previously used Irish Sign Language.

== Language policy ==
In the early days, Boston Spa used Belgian Sign Language which was imported from de Haerne's school in Brussels. After the Second World War, it was decided to introduce oralism through the demands of parents. A St Vincent's Unit was set up half a mile away from the main school to cater for children who could not cope in the main school. St Vincent's Unit eventually adopted Signed English, using British Sign Language. The School has adopted van Uden's Maternal Reflective Method, which promotes Spoken English using written texts.

== The Chapel ==
The barrel-vaulted chapel, opened on 30 October 1889, was designed in a late Tudor and early Elizabethan styles, by Charles Hadfield. Hadfield's father was Matthew E. Hadfield who was the Secretary to the School in its early years. Two memorial windows were erected there, one to Monsignor de Haerne the founder. and another to Matthew E. Hadfield the Secretary.

== Catholic priest paedophile settlement ==
In September 2008, the Roman Catholic Diocese of Leeds agreed to out-of-court settlements with seven men who had attended the school in the 1970s, and had been victims of abuse by a paedophile priest employed by the school. The priest, Father Neil Gallanagh was not imprisoned for the abuses which took place at the school from 1975 to 1980 but no longer practices or dresses as a priest.

== Academic credentials ==
A 2012 survey by SIL International found that past pupils in Northern Ireland from Boston Spa and Mary Hare School are known for higher academic credentials than is usual in the deaf community and often obtain higher paying and more desirable jobs.

=== Ofsted reports ===
Ofsted inspected the School in October 2008 and found it to be Grade 4 (Inadequate), stating that "Significant improvement is required to ensure the School's recruitment policies and procedures comply with all the legislative requirements for the safeguarding of pupils", however the "Effectiveness of the sixth form" (16–19 years of age) was rated Grade 1 (Outstanding). Ofsted inspected again in January 2009, and assessed the school as Grade 2 (Good), stating "The school has swiftly put matters right and all the procedures that are currently required to help safeguard children are now in place." An inspection in February 2012 ranked the school as Grade 2 (Good), with "Behaviour and safety of pupils" ranked as Grade 1 (Outstanding). Ofsted inspected the School's residential care provision in March 2013 and judged the school to be 'Outstanding' in all categories.

Ofsted inspected the School in February 2015 judging it to be Grade 2 (Good), stating that "School leaders have continued to build upon the good standards identified in the previous inspection report", "Teaching is nearly always good, with some examples of outstanding practice", "Students who attend the sixth form unit make excellent progress".

== Notable alumni ==
Lara Crooks, a past pupil, was a regular presenter for See Hear, a TV programme for deaf and hard of hearing people in the United Kingdom. Gerry Hughes, the round the world yachtsman, was also a pupil.

== Trophies ==
Gabby Logan, the school patron, presented the School with the Gabby Logan Gymnastics Trophy. The cup is awarded each year to the pupil making the most progress in gymnastics.
