= I Love My Country (franchise) =

- Created by: Talpa Media
- Developed by: Gijs van Dam
- Directed by: Sander Vahle
- Country of origin: Netherlands

Production
- Production companies: Talpa Media (2008–2019); ITV Studios (2019–present)

Original release
- Release: 8 March 2008 – present

I Love My Country (Dutch: Ik hou van Holland) is a Dutch TV program, first aired in the Netherlands on 8 March 2008. A tenth season was aired in late 2012, with an 11th season airing in 2013. Until 2013, two seasons were aired per year on RTL 4.

The show was created by John de Mol (who also created the television formats of Big Brother, Deal or No Deal, and The Voice) and has been sold to at least 33 countries worldwide.

== Format ==
The series is divided into two teams. Each team, led by its captain, has three members, one in each age-category (20–29, 30–39, 40–49). The teams have to answer multiple questions centered on their own home country, like "What is the capital of...", "When did our country end the war with..." etc. At the end of the program the winning team gets a reward typical for their country of origin, like a bicycle in the Netherlands.

== International versions ==
Legend
Currently airing
No longer airing
Upcoming
Original version

Country	Local title	Channel(s)	Host(s)	First aired
Albania	Dua Vendin Tim	Top Channel	Xhemi Shehu	2012–2013; 2019–2020<2026-2027>
Belarus	Я люблю Беларусь; Ya liubliu Belarus	ONT	Denis Kurian	6 January 2013
Belgium (Flanders)	Zot van Vlaanderen	VTM	Rani De Coninck	October 2010
Belgium (Wallonia)	J'aime mon Pays	RTL-TVI	Thomas Van Hamme	January 2012
Bulgaria	Аз обичам България; Az obicham Bŭlgaria	Nova	Evelina Pavlova	25 March 2011 – 26 May 2017
Bulgaria	Аз обичам България; Az obicham Bŭlgaria	bTV	Alexandra Sarchadjieva	23 February 2024 – 11 December 2025
China	我爱我的祖国; Wǒ ài Wǒ de Zǔ Guó	Sichuan TV	Níng Yuǎn	March 2009
China	I Love China	Hubei Television	Wáng Yīnán	January 2012
China	I Love China	Hubei Television	Li Ai	January 2012
Croatia	Volim Hrvatsku	HRT	Mirko Fodor; Daniela Trbović (2014–2015)	24 September 2012 – present
Czech Republic	I love Česko	TV Nova	Halina Pawlowská	25 October 2008
Czech Republic	Máme rádi Česko	Prima	Libor Bouček	7 April 2013 – present
Denmark	Hva' så Danmark	DR1	Felix Smith	26 November – 30 December 2010
Estonia	Me armastame Eestit	TV3	Eda-Ines Etti	20 September 2013 – present
France	Tout le monde aime la France !	TF1	Sandrine Quetier	28 July 2012 – 31 May 2013
Georgia	მე მიყვარს საქართველო Me miqvars sakartvelo	1TV	Maka Tsintsadze	December 2009
Germany	Ich liebe Deutschland	Sat.1	Jürgen von der Lippe	15 July – 19 August 2011
Greece	Ελλάδα Σ'Αγαπώ; Ellada S'agapó	Mega Channel	Doretta Papadimitriou	April 2015
Hungary	Magyarország, szeretlek!	M1 (2 October 2011 – 31 December 2014); Duna (15 March 2015 – 6 June 2021)	Vajk Szente	2 October 2011 – 6 June 2021
Hungary	Magyarország, szeretlek!	Duna	Csaba Pindroch (2022–2026); Ernő Zsolt Kiss (2026–present)	30 January 2022 – present
Italy	I Love Italy	Rai 2	Claudio Lippi (2010); Massimiliano Ossini and Alessandra Barzaghi (2011)	31 December 2010 – 31 May 2011
Latvia	Es mīlu Tevi, Latvija!	TV3	Zane Daudziņa	31 August 2014 – 15 May 2021, September 2026- present
Lithuania	Aš tikrai myliu Lietuvą	TV3	Marijonas Mikutavičius	16 February – 14 May 2015
Lithuania	Myliu Lietuvą	LRT	Ignas Krupavičius	7 October 2023 – present
Nigeria	I love Nigeria	?	Stephanie Coker	12 September 2015
Netherlands	Ik hou van Holland	RTL 4	Linda de Mol	2008–2016
Netherlands	Ik hou van Holland	SBS6	Linda de Mol; Rob Kemps (2022)	2019–present
Poland	Kocham Cię, Polsko!	TVP2	Maciej Kurzajewski (2009–2012); Barbara Kurdej-Szatan (2016–2018); Marzena Rogalska (2026–)	13 March 2009 – 25 November 2012; 5 March 2016 – 19 May 2018; 6 March 2026 – present
Portugal	I Love Portugal	RTP1	Filomena Cautela and Vasco Palmeirim; Filomena Cautela and João Paulo Rodrigues	11 August 2019 – 10 October 2021; 30 July – 20 August 2023
Romania	Iubesc România	Kanal D	Anca Țurcașiu	February 2010
Romania	România, jos pălăria!	Pro TV	Florin Busuioc	19 September 2017
Russia	Я люблю мою страну Ya lyublyu moyu stranu (Note: Due to Russia's invasion of Ukraine, the show is an unlicensed adaptation produced without ITV Studios' involvement.)	Channel One	Valdis Pelšs	4 November 2023 – present
Saudi Arabia	أحب السعودية; Aheb Assaudia	SBC	Mazroa Almazroa	26 November 2018
Serbia	Ја волим Србију; Ja volim Srbiju	Prva (23 October 2010 – 26 July 2011; 18 February – 17 July 2018); RTS 1 (23 October 2016 – 4 June 2017; 23 September 2019 – present)	Milorad Mandić† (2010–2011); Nina Seničar (2016–2018); Dragana Kosjerina Perduv (2019–present)	23 October 2010 – present
South Africa	I Love South Africa	E.tv	Masechaba Lekalake	May 2014
Slovakia	Milujem Slovensko	Jednotka	Martin Nikodým	1 April 2013 – 23 May 2025
Slovakia	Milujem Slovensko	TV JOJ	Martin Nikodým	31 December 2025 – present
Slovenia	Moja Slovenija	TV SLO 1	Mario Galunič	10 March 2012 – 25 October 2014
Spain	Typical Spanish	La 1	Frank Blanco	19 June – 24 August 2020
Sweden	Hela Sveriges fredag!	SVT1	Malin Olsson	1 March 2013
Thailand	I Love Thailand	Channel 3	Puttachat Pongsuchat	20 March 2016
United Arab Emirates	محلاها بلادي; Mahlaha bladi	Abu Dhabi TV	Samah Ahmad	8 October 2009
United Kingdom	I Love My Country	BBC One	Gabby Logan	3 August – 28 September 2013
Ukraine	Я люблю Україну; Ya ljublju Ukrajinu	1+1 (2009, 2012); TET (2023–present)	Lidiya Taran (2009); Yuriy Horbunov (2012); Kseniya Mishyna (19 March 2023 – 14 February 2025); Daria Petrozhytska (30 March 2025 – present)	27 September – 21 November 2009; 22 March – 16 August 2012; 19 March 2023 – present
