= The Edge (game show) =

BBC Quiz Show

- Genre: Game show
- Presented by: Mark Benton (series 1); Gabby Logan (series 2)
- Theme music composer: Marc Sylvan
- Country of origin: United Kingdom
- Original language: English
- No. of series: 2
- No. of episodes: 50

Production
- Running time: 45 minutes
- Production company: BBC Scotland

Original release
- Network: BBC One
- Release: 16 March – 13 November 2015

Related
- The Finish Line

The Edge is a BBC game show that aired on BBC One from 16 March to 13 November 2015. On the show, contestants answer quiz questions and bowl balls to get prize money, but if the ball rolls over the Edge, their roll scores nothing.

== Gameplay ==
Four contestants start the game. One is eliminated in each round. Each contestant maintains a 'personal bank' consisting of the cash they banked in each round; the surviving finalist plays for a maximum of the contents of their own bank (the cash accrued by eliminated players is lost). Players are permitted offscreen practice rolls before playing the game proper.

=== Round 1 ===
The four contestants take part in the first quiz round; correct answers eventually release their balls, with series 1 requiring four correct answers and series 2 requiring three to allow the player to choose which of the four coloured lanes they will roll on. After a player releases their ball, the other contestants' counts are reset and they play again in the same way for second and third choice, with the remaining player taking the last remaining lane.

In series 1, the players take to their lanes and roll once, with the order of rolls being shortest (green) lane first through to longest (red) lane last and The Edge being worth £1,000; in series 2, the rolls are interspersed throughout the round, and The Edge is worth £1,500. The three highest-rolling players bank their roll value into their Personal Bank; the lowest-rolling player is eliminated. If two players are tied, they roll again concurrently and the closest to the edge without going over goes through. These rolls score no money.

=== Round 2 ===
The three remaining players face a new quiz round, requiring four correct answers to unlock their balls; in series 1, these questions require two correct answers, while in both series four questions are required to unlock their balls. The first player to release their ball gets first choice of lane, and won't face any Danger Zones. The second contestant to free their ball chooses second, and will have one Danger Zone. The remaining player will face two Danger Zones on the remaining lane.

On the lanes, each player rolls twice, with play order again running shortest to longest lane. Players with Danger Zones to face will set the location of these randomly ahead of their first roll by pushing a button, and the Zones remain in the same place for their second roll. The Edge is worth £2,000, all other cash zones are as before and Danger Zones are worth £1 (£0 in Series 2). The two players with the greatest combined scores from their two rolls add these values to their Personal Bank, and the lowest scorer in the round - regardless of what is in their Personal Bank - is eliminated.

=== Round 3 ===
The two remaining players take part in a third quiz round (In Series 1, each question requires three correct answers, whilst in Series 2 five correct question responses are now required). The first player to release their ball chooses which lane - yellow or red - they roll from, and also has the power to set a Danger Zone on their rival's lane.

On the lanes, the players each roll three times; the player with no Danger Zone rolls first, then chooses which of the opponent's cash zones to place the Danger Zone on - the second player then rolls. The first player can, after each of their own rolls, move their opponent's Danger Zone to another value if they wish. The Edge is worth £3,000 in this round. The player with the highest combined score after three rolls each takes the money won into their Personal Bank; the lower score is eliminated.

=== Final round ===
The remaining player now plays to win the contents of their Personal Bank; all other cash values are blanked. To win the prize, the contestant has to stop a ball on The Edge. Before they roll, they face a final quiz round, 75 seconds of questions (each requiring four correct answers in Series 1). For each question correctly answered, the Edge is enlarged by the equivalent of two cash zones. Once on the red lane, the player can choose to roll once for the full bank amount, twice for half the amount or three times for one-third the amount; they choose how many rolls they want to wager ahead of rolling, and are not reimbursed if they succeed in fewer rolls than nominated. If all their rolls fail to stop in the winning area - either by coming up short or by going over the Edge - the player wins nothing. The maximum a player can win is £14,000 (£14,500 in Series 2); in order for that to happen, the player must roll all six balls exactly on the Edge in the first three rounds (£1,000 + £2,000 + £2,000 + £3,000 + £3,000 + £3,000 = £14,000 in Series 1, £1,500 + £2,000 + £2,000 + £3,000 + £3,000 + £3,000 = £14,500 in Series 2) and choose to roll only one ball in the final round and land it in the winning area.

=== Difference between series ===
==== Series 1 ====
There are four lanes - coded green, blue, yellow and red - of increasing length. The length of the initial run-up zone, worth £1 on all lanes, varies with the lane length; the 'cash zones' from £10 to £950, and The Edge, are the same on all lanes. Going over the Edge at any time means that roll is worth nil. Guard rails between each lane prevent rolls straying into neighbouring lanes. At the end of each round, the shortest lane remaining in play is shut off, with the final played only on the red lane.

==== Series 2 ====
The lanes have been redesigned - the Edge is now a different size on each lane - the shortest (green) lane has the largest Edge, and the red lane has an Edge comparable to that of the first series. The run-up area ahead of the cash zone is now worth zero, removing the tactical advantage these had in series one (where, if a rival rolled off the Edge, a player could remain in the game with a deliberately short roll); the cash values have also been altered, now going up to £1300, with landing the Edge in round one now being worth £1500.

The concept of requiring two, three and four-part answers in the later rounds has been dropped; all quiz questions are now in a straight one-question-one-answer form.

Players also no longer choose their own lane at any point - all quiz rounds allow the first player to release their ball to take the shortest available lane, and the last player left after all others have freed their ball will always be left with the red lane.

In round one, rather than playing through the entire quiz round, then the entire bowling round, as previously, once a player releases their ball they will now step up to the lane for their roll, and remain stationed at the lane thereafter whilst the remaining players continue the quiz.

Danger Zones remain in play in rounds 2 and 3 and are set in the same way as before - by pressing a button in round 2 and at the direction of the opposing player in round 3 - but are now worth nothing rather than £1.

Aside from the switch to single-response questions, the final round remains as played in series 1.

== Transmissions ==
Series	Start date	End date	Episodes
1	16 March 2015	17 April 2015	25
2	12 October 2015	13 November 2015	25
