= Désiré de Haerne =

Belgian Catholic priest

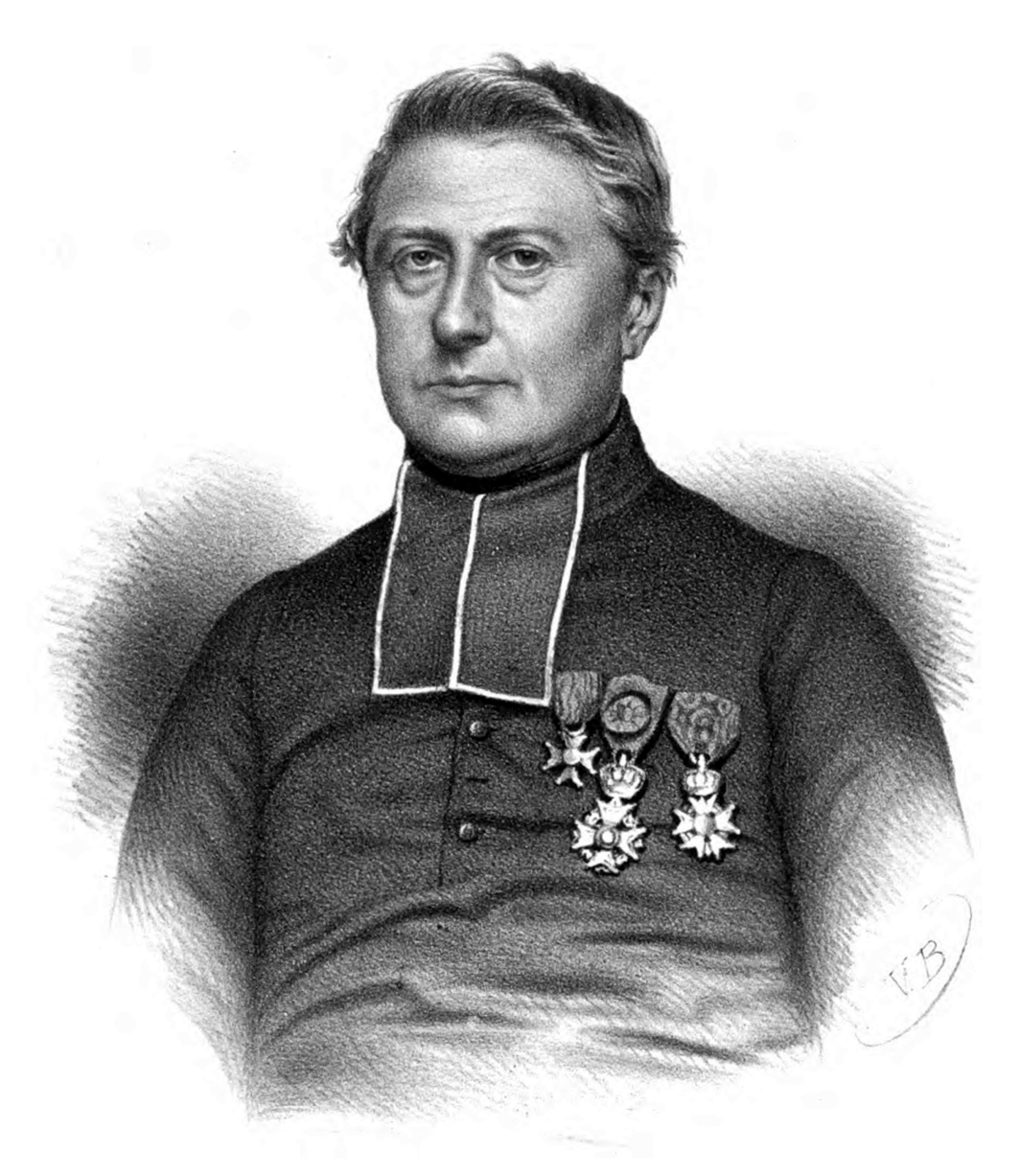
- Lithograph after an 1858 photograph by Brandt & Detrez
- Born: Désiré-Pierre-Antoine de Haerne; 4 July 1804; Ypres
- Died: 22 March 1890 (aged 85); Saint-Josse-ten-Noode, Brussels
- Occupations: politician, catholic priest
- Known for: signer of Belgian constitution
- Political party: catholic democrat

Désiré de Haerne (4 July 1804 – 22 March 1890) was a Catholic priest, who was one of the signers of the Belgian constitution. He also founded the St John's Catholic School for the Deaf, which today is located in Boston Spa, West Yorkshire, and he was for a time director of the Royal Institution for Deaf (and Dumb Girls) in Brussels, Belgium.

== Life and career ==
Désiré-Pierre-Antoine de Haerne was born on 4 July 1804 in Ypres, Belgium, when it was part of the Kingdom of the Netherlands. His parents were Pierre de Haerne (1780-1849), a lace merchant and minor government official, and Sophie-Catherine van der Ghote. His brother Auguste de Haerne (1806-1870) became the "Doyen of Ninove", probably at the abbey of St. Cornelius, where he had a dozen priests under his direction; and another brother Louis de Haerne (1817-1887) became the king’s district commissioner of Eeklo (Echlo), and at times was administrator of the districts of Turnhout, Tielt and Roeselare (Roulers).

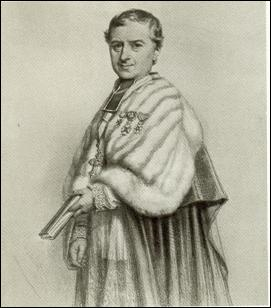

Désiré decided to enter the church, and after completing his studies at the College of Ypres and then the Seminary of Ghent, he taught during 1824-25 school year at the College of Courtrai. He was ordained a deacon in 1827, and then a priest in 1828. After which he was appointed in 1829 as the Vicar of Moorslede, but served there only ten months. When he wrote against the Dutch King William I, he was forced in 1830 to flee Belgium, disguised as a horse merchant, and take refuge in France. He returned the following year when Belgium gained independence from the Netherlands, and was elected in 1830, at the age of just 26, as the representative of Roeselare to the congress that helped to frame the Belgian constitution. Then for thirteen years he was professor of Rhetoric at the College of Courtrai. He returned to politics in 1844 and became a member of the Belgian parliament, representing for the next 46 years the district of Courtrai. He also received in 1855 the honorary title of Canon of the Cathedral of Bruges, and Pope Pius IX in 1870 made him a bishop.

When as a young man in 1829 he was ministering in Moorslede, he began working with deaf people, which led to him taking on from 1858 to 1869 the position of director of the Royal Institution for the Deaf (and Dumb Girls) in Brussels. Then from 1869 to 1873 he was rector of the English Seminary in Bruges. He also founded in 1870 the St John's Catholic School for the Deaf (formerly St. John's Institution), in Handsworth, Woodhouse (a suburb of Sheffield in South Yorkshire), which was the first catholic school for the deaf in England. This school was moved in 1875 to Boston Spa in Leeds, West Yorkshire, where it is located today. He also helped to start in 1885 the Bombay Institution for the Deaf and Mutes in India. In addition to these accomplishments, he invented a sign language, wrote several academic articles on his work with deaf people, and published various political pieces as well. Probably his best known publication in the United States is the American Question, which was published during the Civil War, and he was also lauded in the United States for a eulogy that he gave after President Abraham Lincoln's assassination.

== Death and recognition ==
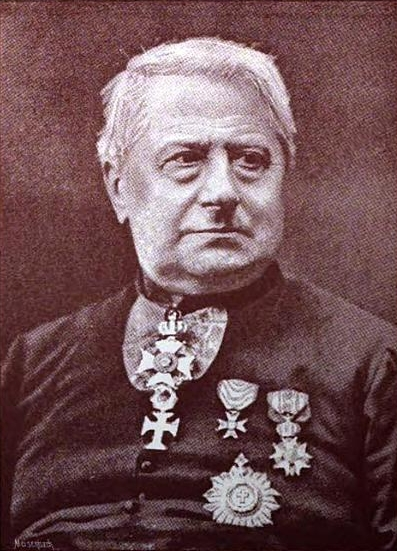

Désiré de Haerne was made a knight of the Order of Leopold (Belgium), the Order of the Crown (Belgium), the Order of Charles III (Spain), the Legion of Honour (France), and the Order of Christ (Portugal). He died on 22 March 1890 in Saint-Josse-ten-Noode, a suburb of Brussels. Memorials in his honor at St. John's School in England include a statue of him on the roof of the chapel, and a stained glass portrait in one of the chapel windows. There is also a statue of him by the sculptor Paul de Vigne that was unveiled on 26 August 1895 in the town square (Mgr. de Harneplein) of Courtrai, Belgium. This statue was moved in 1929, then again in 1951, and today stands in a park on Avenue Monseigneur de Haerne in Courtrai.
