= Inside Sport (TV series) =

- Presented by: Gabby Logan
- Country of origin: United Kingdom
- No. of series: 4

Production
- Running time: 40 minutes

Original release
- Network: BBC One
- Release: 30 April 2007

Inside Sport is a weekly sports magazine programme produced by BBC Sport, presented by Gabby Logan.

The programme is transmitted twice a week, with an extended edition broadcast at Sunday lunch-time. Inside Sport combines mainstream sporting issues with topics that may not be widely known to the sporting public, such as injured soldiers training to become Paralympic athletes. The show also runs documentary features, following the daily routine of high-profile sportsmen. These have included Kevin Pietersen, Arsène Wenger, Andy Murray, Ricky Hatton, Owen Hargreaves and Dwain Chambers. Regular studio guests include Tony Livesey, Des Kelly, Jonathan Pearce and Steve Bunce.

There are also versions of Inside Sport for BBC World News and the BBC News channel.
