= Journalism Diversity Fund =

The Journalism Diversity Fund is a United Kingdom organisation set up by industry leaders in order to support the training of journalists from ethnically and socially diverse backgrounds and those without the financial means to fund NCTJ-accredited courses.

== History ==
It is an industry fund and was set up with the help of the Newspaper Licensing Agency in association with publishing companies including Associated Newspapers, Guardian News and Media Group, News International and Pearson. At the launch of the fund, at the Society of Editors’ conference in 2005, the NLA pledged to support the ongoing development and financing of the fund.

The fund is managed and administered on behalf of the industry by the National Council for the Training of Journalists (NCTJ). The NCTJ is recognised inside and outside the media industry as the primary body for developing qualified journalists.

== Supporters ==
The fund was set up with a donation of £100,000 from the Newspaper Licensing Agency and is financially supported by leading publishing companies including Bloomberg, the BBC, CNN, the FT, Channel 4 News, ITV News, Reuters, Sky, ITN, and Yahoo News UK.

The National Newspapers’ Diversity Forum – made up of the Daily Mail, the Daily Mirror, the Daily Telegraph, The Financial Times, the Guardian, The Independent, The Sun and The Times; and the Society of Editors – also support the fund.
