= National Council for the Training of Journalists =

The National Council for the Training of Journalists (NCTJ) was founded in 1951 as organisation to oversee the training of journalists for the newspaper industry in the United Kingdom and is now playing a role in the wider media. It is a self-appointed body and does not hold any statutory powers from central government, meaning students and those seeking to enter the media industry do not have to legally hold one of its qualifications to obtain work as a journalist.

== Purpose ==
The NCTJ delivers the premier training scheme for journalists in the United Kingdom The NCTJ offers a range of qualifications for those beginning a career in journalism and for those who want to continue their professional development. The Level 3 Diploma in Journalism introduced in 2007 and the Level 5 National Qualification in Journalism (NQJ) introduced in 2013 have been joined by apprenticeship and foundation certificate qualifications. Qualifications cover news, magazine, production, sports, business and finance, online, video, radio and television journalism. Courses are vocational, focusing on skills convergence and multimedia journalism.

The NCTJ is a charity for all media with a professional awarding body recognised by Ofqual, Qualification Wales and CCEA Northern Ireland, an accreditation board, Student Council, focus groups and forums, and the annual Journalism Skills Conference.

NCTJ alumni include Mark Austin, Piers Morgan, Kay Burley, John Inverdale, Reshmin Chowdhury, Geordie Greig and Helen Skelton.

As well as being the examining body, the NCTJ offers short training courses to refresh candidates' knowledge prior to them sitting exams, and also for professionals looking for related training.

The NCTJ is also a professional awarding body recognised by the Office of Qualifications and Examinations Regulator Ofqual.

== Diploma in Journalism ==
The Diploma in Journalism is a Level 5 qualification that is made up of four mandatory subjects – essential journalism, essential journalism e-portfolio, essential journalism ethics and regulation and essential media law and regulation – and a selection of elective skills modules.

To meet the gold standard, candidates have to achieve grades A-C in all subjects plus 100wpm shorthand.

== NQJ ==
The National Qualification in Journalism (NQJ) is a Level 5 qualification that examines all-round competence in a range of essential journalism skills.

To be eligible to sit the NQJ, candidates must have achieved the gold standard in the Diploma in Journalism and have undertaken a period of 18 months' full-time employment on a newspaper or news agency.

== The Oxdown Gazette ==
The Oxdown Gazette was a fictional newspaper launched in October 1979, used by the NCTJ as a setting for its journalism exam papers. Trainee journalists would have to write reports on fires, floods, rail crashes and fatal accidents in the imaginary town of Oxdown. The idea was to replicate, as far as possible, the sense of local knowledge trainees would have if working for a real paper.

In 2006, the NCTJ decided that it would no longer use Oxdown – instead, a variety of locations and publications would feature on its exam papers. This did not go down well with some journalists and journalism lecturers, who had a sentimental attachment to the fictional town and launched a campaign to save it. This was however unsuccessful and in the next sitting of the seniors' exam, the NCTJ actually blew the town up, using a series of deadly explosions as the backdrop for the news report section of the paper.

== Journalists at Work survey ==
The NCTJ published four "Journalists at Work" survey reports authored by Mark Spilsbury, in 2002, 2012, 2018 and 2024. Over 1,000 journalists were surveyed for the first two, 885 for the third and 1025 in 2024.The 2018 survey found an increase in the number of UK journalists, but a drop in their real wages, and a trend towards a "London-centric" industry. The 2024 survey found that social class still affects the likelihood of someone entering the profession, with sixty-seven per cent of journalists having a parent in one of the three highest occupational groups, compared to 45 per cent of all UK workers.

== See also ==
- Journalism Diversity Fund
