= The Best FIFA Football Awards 2020 =

International football awards

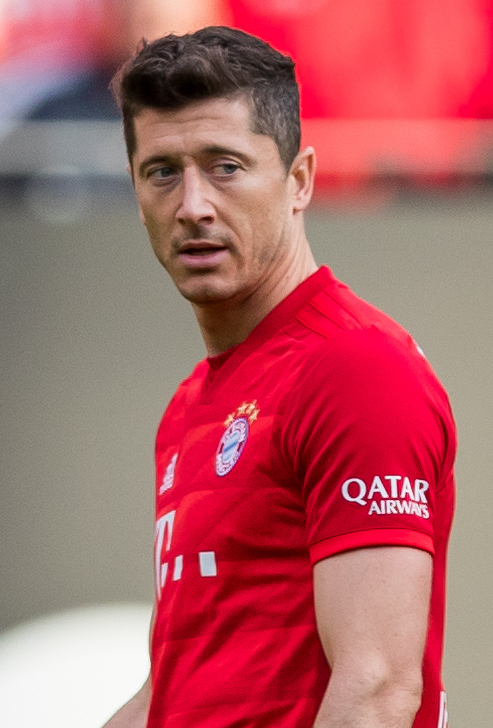
- Robert Lewandowski, The Best FIFA Men's Player 2020
- Date: 17 December 2020
- Presented by: FIFA
- Hosted by: Ruud Gullit and Reshmin Chowdhury

Highlights
- The Best FIFA Player: Men's: (Poland) Robert Lewandowski; Women's: (England) Lucy Bronze
- The Best FIFA Coach: Men's: (Germany) Jürgen Klopp; Women's: (Netherlands) Sarina Wiegman
- The Best FIFA Goalkeeper: Men's: (Germany) Manuel Neuer; Women's: (France) Sarah Bouhaddi
- FIFA Puskás Award: (South Korea) Son Heung-min
- Website: fifa.com

The Best FIFA Football Awards 2020 were held on 17 December 2020. The ceremony was held virtually due to the ongoing COVID-19 pandemic.

== Winners and nominees ==
=== The Best FIFA Men's Player ===
Eleven players were shortlisted on 25 November 2020. The three finalists were revealed on 11 December 2020.

Robert Lewandowski won the award with 52 rank points.

The selection criteria for the men's players of the year was: respective achievements during the period from 20 July 2019 to 7 October 2020.

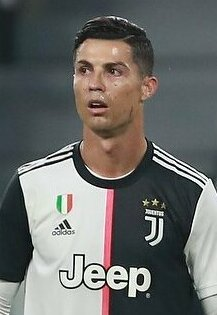
Cristiano Ronaldo

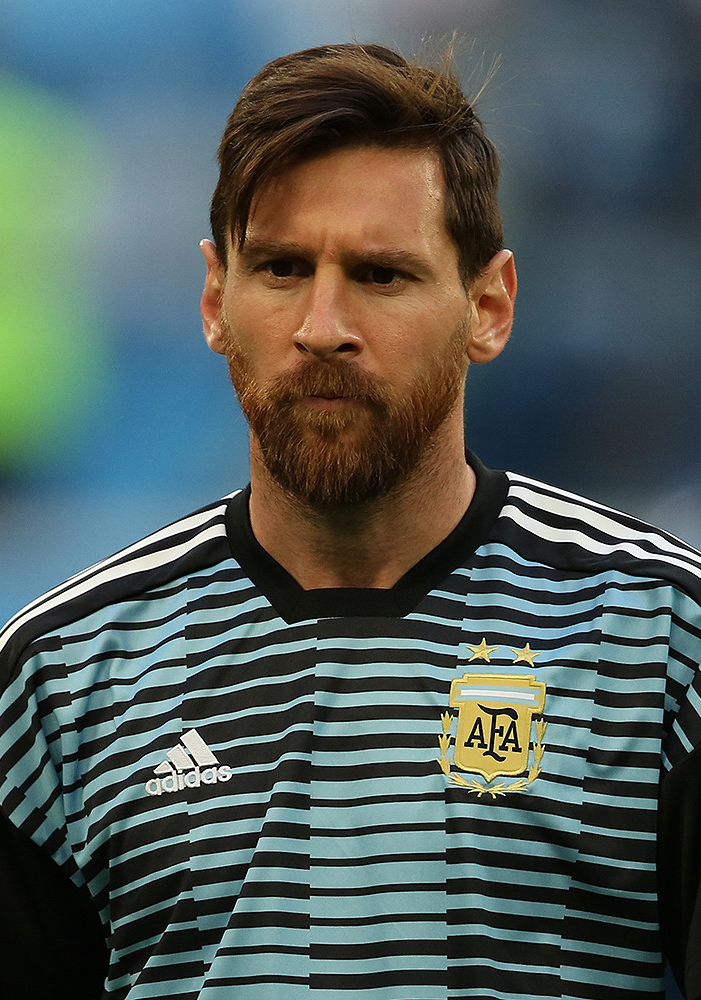
Lionel Messi

Rank	Player	Club(s) played for	National team	Points
The finalists
1	Robert Lewandowski	(Germany) Bayern Munich	Poland	52
2	Cristiano Ronaldo	(Italy) Juventus	Portugal	38
3	Lionel Messi	(Spain) Barcelona	Argentina	35
Other candidates
4	Sadio Mané	(England) Liverpool	Senegal	29
5	Kevin De Bruyne	(England) Manchester City	Belgium	26
6	Mohamed Salah	(England) Liverpool	Egypt	25
7	Kylian Mbappé	(France) Paris Saint-Germain	France	19
8	Thiago	(Germany) Bayern Munich; (England) Liverpool	Spain	17
9	Neymar	(France) Paris Saint-Germain	Brazil	16
10	Virgil van Dijk	(England) Liverpool	Netherlands	13
11	Sergio Ramos	(Spain) Real Madrid	Spain	7

=== The Best FIFA Men's Goalkeeper ===
Six players were shortlisted on 25 November 2020. The three finalists were revealed on 11 December 2020.

Manuel Neuer won the award with 28 rank points.

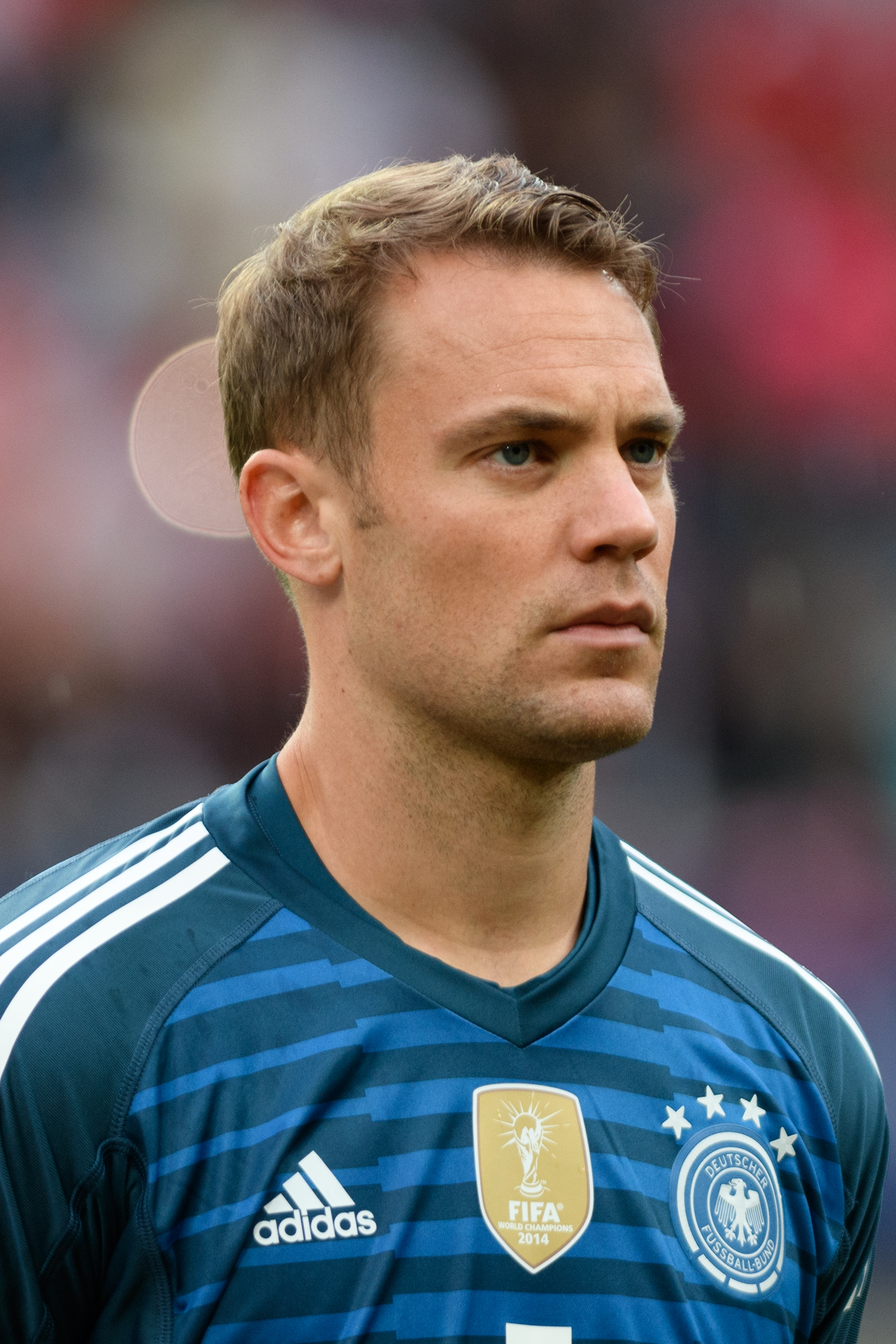
Manuel Neuer

Rank	Player	Club(s) played for	National team	Points
The finalists
1	Manuel Neuer	(Germany) Bayern Munich	Germany	28
2	Alisson	(England) Liverpool	Brazil	20
3	Jan Oblak	(Spain) Atlético Madrid	Slovenia	12
Other candidates
4	Keylor Navas	(France) Paris Saint-Germain	Costa Rica	5
5	Marc-André ter Stegen	(Spain) Barcelona	Germany	4
6	Thibaut Courtois	(Spain) Real Madrid	Belgium	3

=== The Best FIFA Men's Coach ===
Five coaches were initially shortlisted on 25 November 2020. The three finalists were revealed on 11 December 2020.

Jürgen Klopp won the award with 24 rank points.

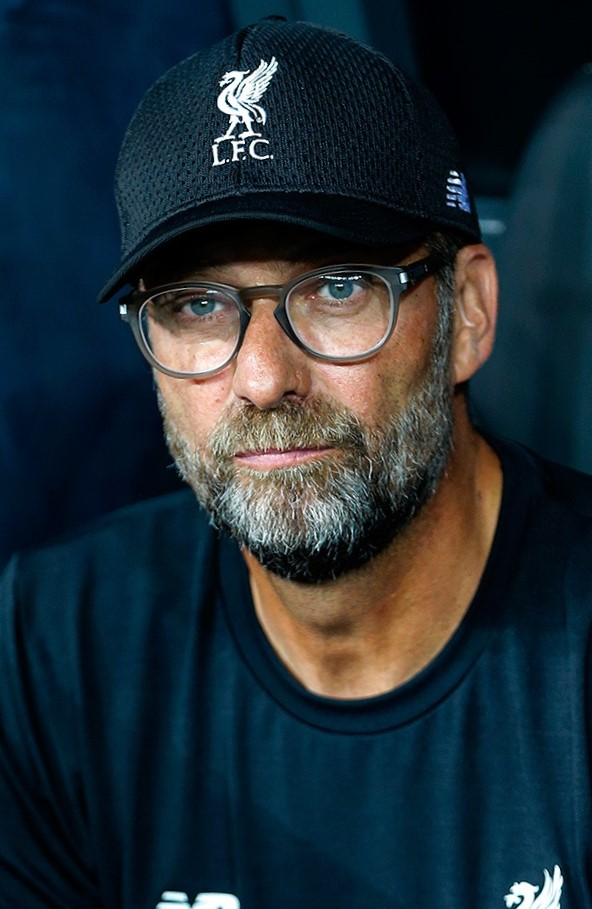
Jürgen Klopp

Rank	Coach	Team(s) managed	Points
The finalists
1	(Germany) Jürgen Klopp	(England) Liverpool	24 (won based on more votes from national team coaches)
2	(Germany) Hansi Flick	(Germany) Bayern Munich	24
3	(Argentina) Marcelo Bielsa	(England) Leeds United	11
Other candidates
4	(France) Zinedine Zidane	(Spain) Real Madrid	9
5	(Spain) Julen Lopetegui	(Spain) Sevilla	4

=== The Best FIFA Women's Player ===
Eleven players were shortlisted on 25 November 2020. The three finalists were revealed on 11 December 2020.

Lucy Bronze won the award with 52 rank points.

The selection criteria for the women's players of the year was: respective achievements during the period from 8 July 2019 to 7 October 2020.

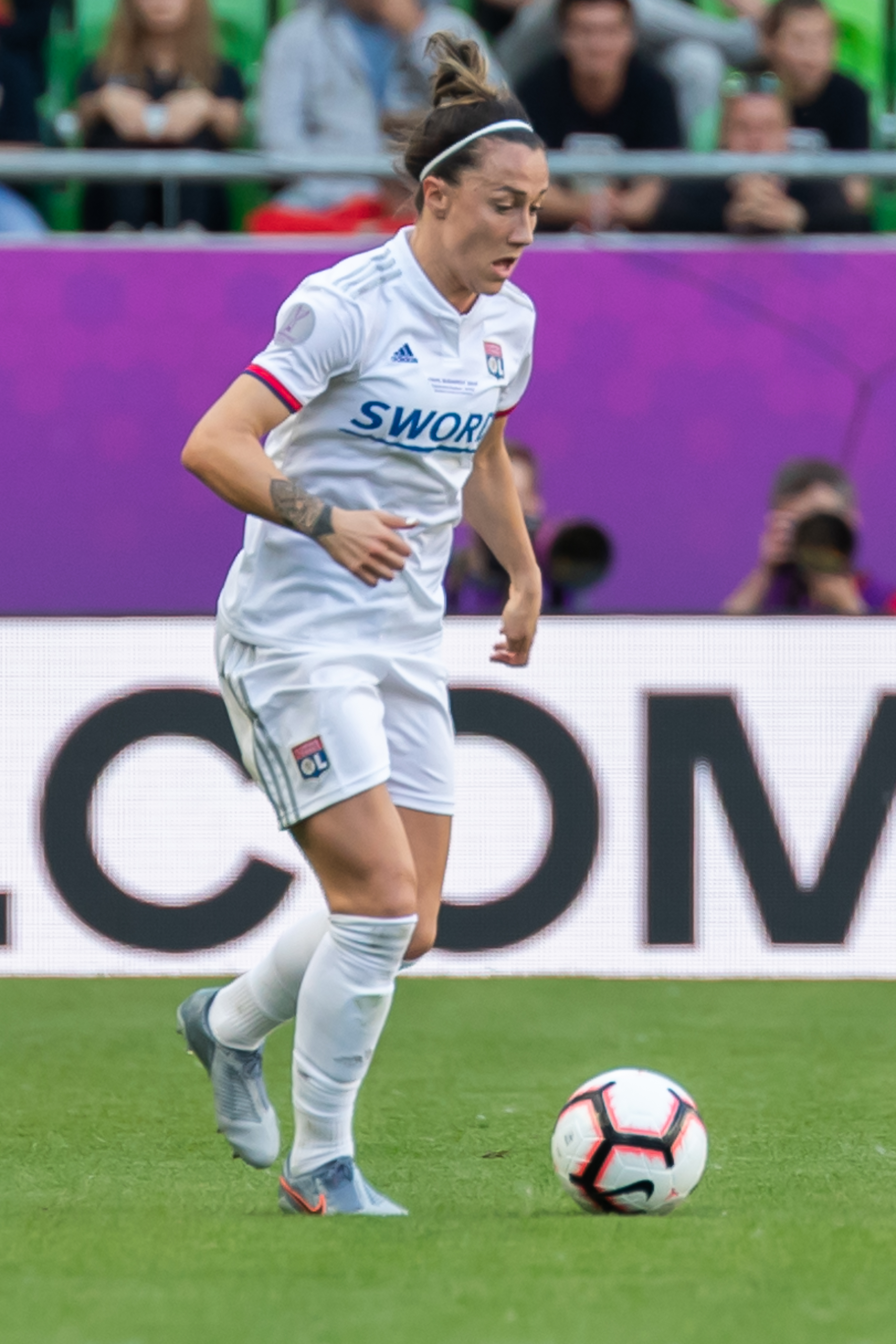
Lucy Bronze

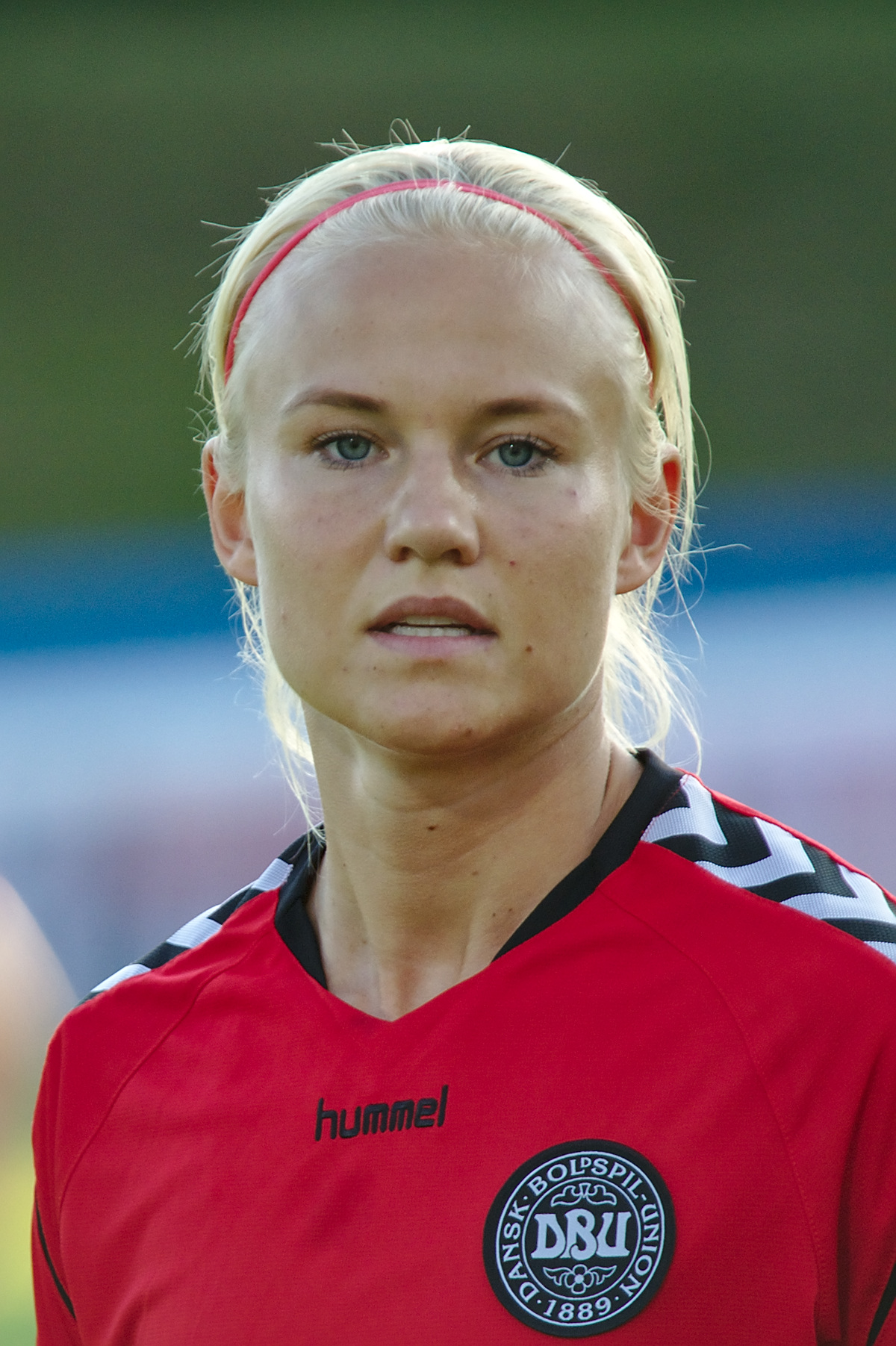
Pernille Harder

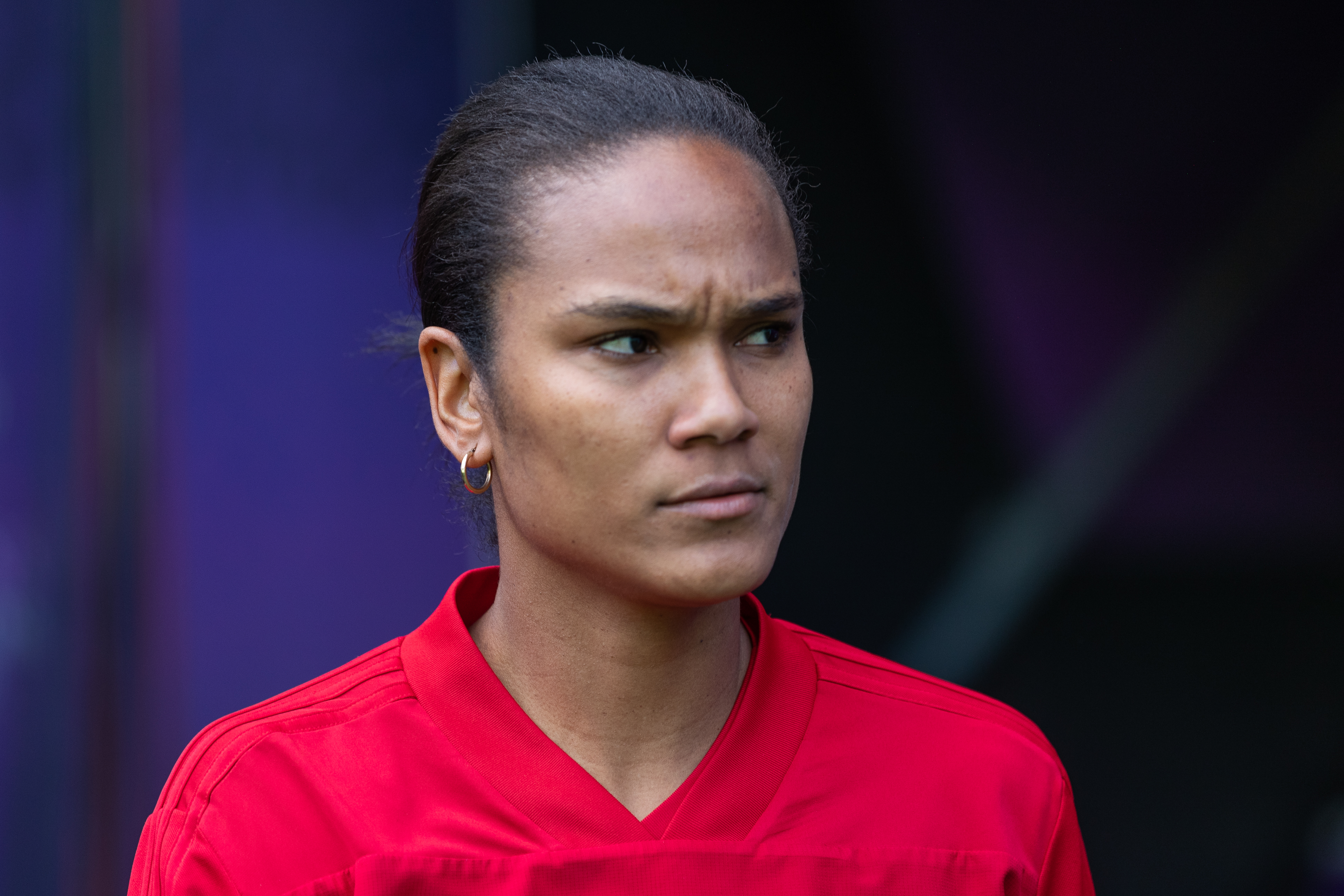
Wendie Renard

Rank	Player	Club(s) played for	National team	Points
The finalists
1	Lucy Bronze	(France) Lyon; (England) Manchester City	England	52
2	Pernille Harder	(Germany) VfL Wolfsburg; (England) Chelsea	Denmark	40
3	Wendie Renard	(France) Lyon	France	35
Other candidates
4	Vivianne Miedema	(England) Arsenal	Netherlands	31
5	Delphine Cascarino	(France) Lyon	France	30
6	Dzsenifer Marozsán	(France) Lyon	Germany	25
7	Sam Kerr	(United States) Chicago Red Stars; (England) Chelsea	Australia	20
8	Caroline Graham Hansen	(Spain) Barcelona	Norway	15
9	Jennifer Hermoso	(Spain) Barcelona	Spain	15
10	Saki Kumagai	(France) Lyon	Japan	7
11	Ji So-yun	(England) Chelsea	South Korea	7

=== The Best FIFA Women's Goalkeeper ===
Six players were shortlisted on 25 November 2020. The three finalists were revealed on 11 December 2020.

Sarah Bouhaddi won the award with 24 rank points.

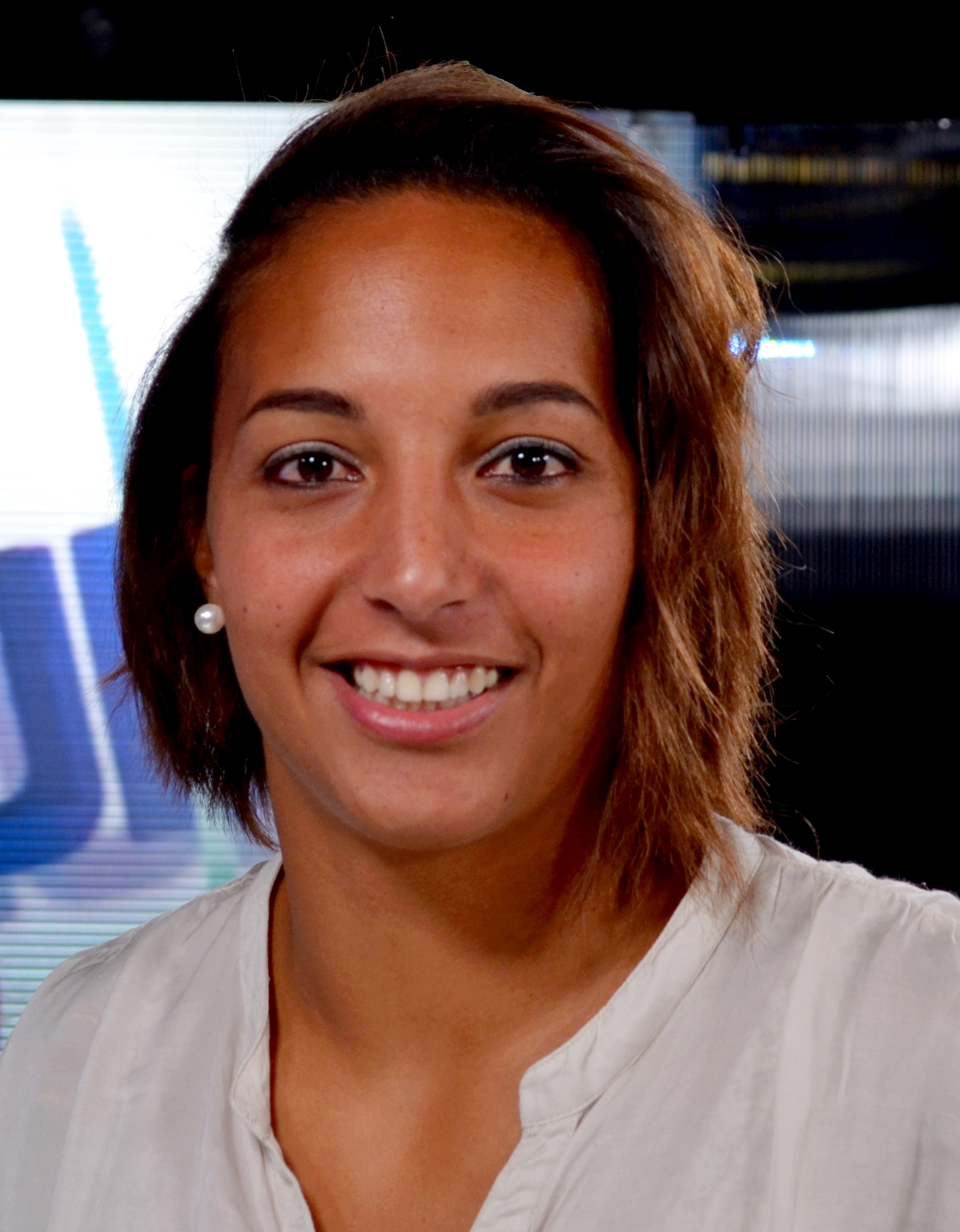
Sarah Bouhaddi

Rank	Player	Club(s) played for	National team	Points
The finalists
1	Sarah Bouhaddi	(France) Lyon	France	24
2	Christiane Endler	(France) Paris Saint-Germain	Chile	22
3	Alyssa Naeher	(United States) Chicago Red Stars	United States	10
Other candidates
4	Ann-Katrin Berger	(England) Chelsea	Germany	6
5	Hedvig Lindahl	(Germany) VfL Wolfsburg; (Spain) Atlético Madrid	Sweden	5
6	Ellie Roebuck	(England) Manchester City	England	5

=== The Best FIFA Women's Coach ===
Seven coaches were initially shortlisted on 25 November 2020. The three finalists were revealed on 11 December 2020.

Sarina Wiegman won the award with 26 rank points.

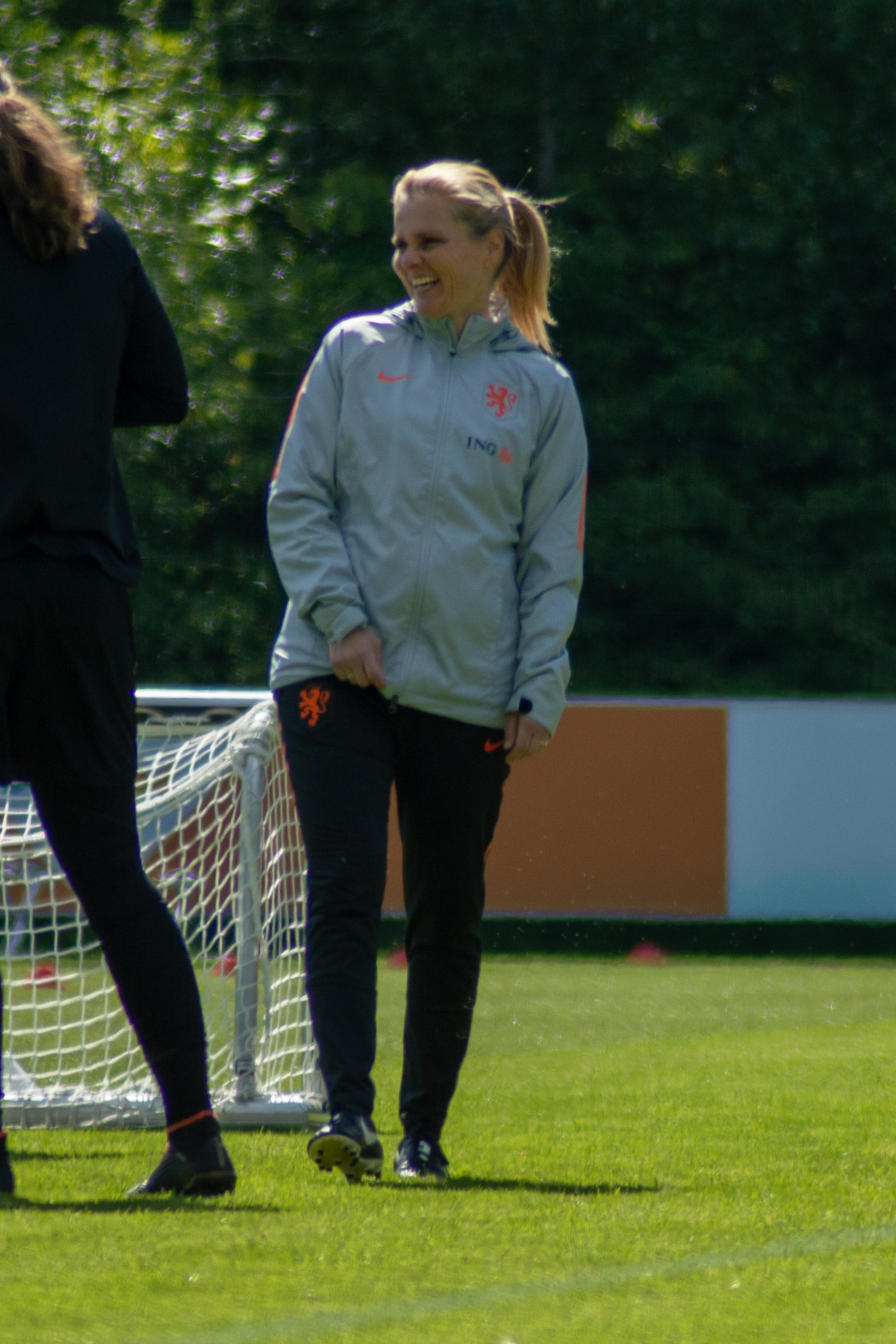
Sarina Wiegman

Rank	Coach	Team(s) managed	Points
The finalists
1	(Netherlands) Sarina Wiegman	Netherlands	26
2	(France) Jean-Luc Vasseur	(France) Lyon	20
3	(England) Emma Hayes	(England) Chelsea	12
Other candidates
4	(Germany) Stephan Lerch	(Germany) VfL Wolfsburg	7
5	(Spain) Lluís Cortés	(Spain) Barcelona	6
6	(Italy) Rita Guarino	(Italy) Juventus	1
7	(Norway) Hege Riise	(Norway) LSK Kvinner	0

=== FIFA Puskás Award ===
The eleven players shortlisted for the awards were announced on 25 November 2020. The three finalists were revealed on 11 December 2020. All goals up for consideration were scored from 20 July 2019 to 7 October 2020. Every registered FIFA.com user was allowed to participate in the final vote until 9 December 2020, with the questionnaire being presented on the official website of FIFA. The top three goals from the vote were then voted on by a panel of ten "FIFA experts", who chose the winner.

Son Heung-min won the award with 24 rank points.

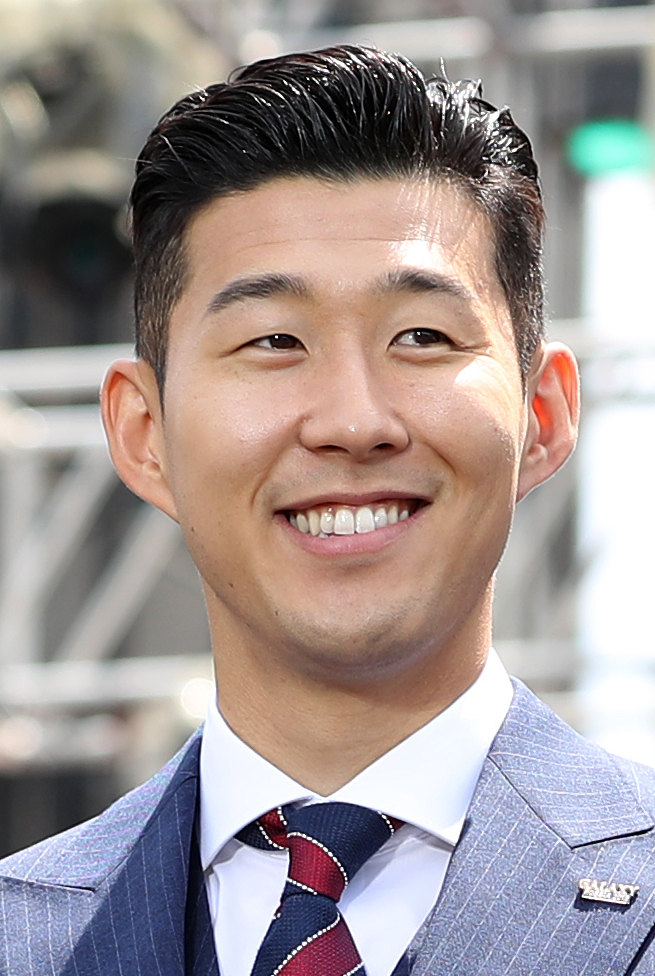
Son Heung-min

Rank	Player	Match	Competition	Date	Points
The finalists
1	(South Korea) Son Heung-min	Tottenham Hotspur – Burnley	2019–20 Premier League	7 December 2019	24
2	(Uruguay) Giorgian De Arrascaeta	Ceará – Flamengo	2019 Campeonato Brasileiro Série A	25 August 2019	22
3	(Uruguay) Luis Suárez	Barcelona – Mallorca	2019–20 La Liga	7 December 2019	20
Other candidates
Unranked	(Costa Rica) Shirley Cruz	Costa Rica – Panama	2020 CONCACAF Women's Olympic Qualifying Championship	28 January 2020	N/A
Unranked	(England) Jordan Flores	Shamrock Rovers – Dundalk	2020 League of Ireland Premier Division	28 February 2020	N/A
Unranked	(France) André-Pierre Gignac	UANL – UNAM	Liga MX Clausura 2020	1 March 2020	N/A
Unranked	(Wales) Sophie Ingle	Arsenal – Chelsea	2019–20 FA WSL	19 January 2020	N/A
Unranked	(Austria) Zlatko Junuzović	Rapid Wien – Red Bull Salzburg	2019–20 Austrian Bundesliga	24 June 2020	N/A
Unranked	(South Africa) Hlompho Kekana	Mamelodi Sundowns – Cape Town City	2019–20 South African Premier Division	20 August 2019	N/A
Unranked	(Ecuador) Leonel Quiñónez	Universidad Católica – Macará	2019 Ecuadorian Serie A	19 August 2019	N/A
Unranked	(Scotland) Caroline Weir	Manchester City – Manchester United	2019–20 FA WSL	7 September 2019	N/A

=== FIFA Fan Award ===
The award celebrates the best fan moments or gestures of September 2019 to September 2020, regardless of championship, gender or nationality. The shortlist was compiled by a panel of FIFA experts, and every registered FIFA.com user was allowed to participate in the final vote until 16 December 2020.

The three nominees were announced on 25 November 2020. Marivaldo Francisco da Silva won the award with over 130,000 votes.

Rank	Fan(s)	Match	Competition	Date	Votes
1	(Brazil) Marivaldo Francisco da Silva	Various	Various	Various	138,122
2	Colombia fans	N/A	N/A	Various	116,616
3	(Scotland) James Anderson	N/A	N/A	Various	86,182

=== FIFA Fair Play Award ===
Winner	Team	Reason
(Italy) Mattia Agnese	Ospedaletti Calcio	Administered first aid to an opponent who lost consciousness during a match

=== FIFA FIFPRO Men's World 11 ===
The 55–player men's shortlist was announced on 10 December 2020.

The players chosen were Alisson as goalkeeper, Trent Alexander-Arnold, Alphonso Davies, Sergio Ramos and Virgil van Dijk as defenders, Kevin De Bruyne, Joshua Kimmich and Thiago as midfielders, and Robert Lewandowski, Lionel Messi and Cristiano Ronaldo as forwards.

2020 FIFA FIFPRO Men's World 11

Player	Club(s)
Goalkeeper
(Brazil) Alisson	(England) Liverpool
Defenders
(England) Trent Alexander-Arnold	(England) Liverpool
(Canada) Alphonso Davies	(Germany) Bayern Munich
(Netherlands) Virgil van Dijk	(England) Liverpool
(Spain) Sergio Ramos	(Spain) Real Madrid
Midfielders
(Belgium) Kevin De Bruyne	(England) Manchester City
(Germany) Joshua Kimmich	(Germany) Bayern Munich
(Spain) Thiago	(Germany) Bayern Munich; (England) Liverpool
Forwards
(Poland) Robert Lewandowski	(Germany) Bayern Munich
(Argentina) Lionel Messi	(Spain) Barcelona
(Portugal) Cristiano Ronaldo	(Italy) Juventus

Ranking of other nominees

Rank	Player	Club(s)
Goalkeepers
2	(Germany) Manuel Neuer	(Germany) Bayern Munich
3	(Slovenia) Jan Oblak	(Spain) Atlético Madrid
4	(Germany) Marc-André ter Stegen	(Spain) Barcelona
5	(Belgium) Thibaut Courtois	(Spain) Real Madrid
6	(Spain) David de Gea	(England) Manchester United
7	(Costa Rica) Keylor Navas	(France) Paris Saint-Germain
8	(Brazil) Ederson	(England) Manchester City
9	(Italy) Gianluigi Donnarumma	(Italy) Milan
10	(France) Hugo Lloris	(England) Tottenham Hotspur
Defenders
5	(Austria) David Alaba	(Germany) Bayern Munich
6	(Spain) Jordi Alba	(Spain) Barcelona
7	(Brazil) Dani Alves	(Brazil) São Paulo
8	(Senegal) Kalidou Koulibaly	(Italy) Napoli
9	(Brazil) Thiago Silva	(France) Paris Saint-Germain; (England) Chelsea
10	(Scotland) Andy Robertson	(England) Liverpool
11	(Brazil) Marcelo	(Spain) Real Madrid
12	(Germany) Jérôme Boateng	(Germany) Bayern Munich
13	(Netherlands) Matthijs de Ligt	(Italy) Juventus
14	(France) Raphaël Varane	(Spain) Real Madrid
15	(Belgium) Toby Alderweireld	(England) Tottenham Hotspur
Midfielders
4	(Portugal) Bruno Fernandes	(Portugal) Sporting CP; (England) Manchester United
5	(Croatia) Luka Modrić	(Spain) Real Madrid
6	(France) N'Golo Kanté	(England) Chelsea
7	(Netherlands) Frenkie de Jong	(Spain) Barcelona
8	(Germany) Toni Kroos	(Spain) Real Madrid
9	(Germany) Leon Goretzka	(Germany) Bayern Munich
10	(Brazil) Casemiro	(Spain) Real Madrid
11	(Spain) Sergio Busquets	(Spain) Barcelona
12	(Germany) Thomas Müller	(Germany) Bayern Munich
13	(Brazil) Philippe Coutinho	(Germany) Bayern Munich; (Spain) Barcelona
14	(England) Jordan Henderson	(England) Liverpool
15	(England) Dele Alli	(England) Tottenham Hotspur
Forwards
4	(Norway) Erling Haaland	(Austria) Red Bull Salzburg; (Germany) Borussia Dortmund
5	(France) Kylian Mbappé	(France) Paris Saint-Germain
6	(Brazil) Neymar	(France) Paris Saint-Germain
7	(Sweden) Zlatan Ibrahimović	(United States) LA Galaxy; (Italy) Milan
8	(Senegal) Sadio Mané	(England) Liverpool
9	(France) Karim Benzema	(Spain) Real Madrid
10	(Gabon) Pierre-Emerick Aubameyang	(England) Arsenal
11	(Argentina) Sergio Agüero	(England) Manchester City
12	(Egypt) Mohamed Salah	(England) Liverpool
13	(England) Harry Kane	(England) Tottenham Hotspur
14	(Germany) Serge Gnabry	(Germany) Bayern Munich
15	(South Korea) Son Heung-min	(England) Tottenham Hotspur

=== FIFA FIFPRO Women's World 11 ===
The 55–player women's shortlist was announced on 10 December 2020.

The players chosen were Christiane Endler as goalkeeper, Millie Bright, Lucy Bronze and Wendie Renard as defenders, Barbara Bonansea, Verónica Boquete and Delphine Cascarino as midfielders, and Pernille Harder, Tobin Heath, Vivianne Miedema and Megan Rapinoe as forwards.

2020 FIFA FIFPRO Women's World 11

Player	Club(s)
Goalkeeper
(Chile) Christiane Endler	(France) Paris Saint-Germain
Defenders
(England) Millie Bright	(England) Chelsea
(England) Lucy Bronze	(France) Lyon; (England) Manchester City
(France) Wendie Renard	(France) Lyon
Midfielders
(Italy) Barbara Bonansea	(Italy) Juventus
(Spain) Verónica Boquete	(United States) Utah Royals FC; (Italy) Milan
(France) Delphine Cascarino	(France) Lyon
Forwards
(Denmark) Pernille Harder	(Germany) VfL Wolfsburg; (England) Chelsea
(United States) Tobin Heath	(United States) Portland Thorns FC; (England) Manchester United
(Netherlands) Vivianne Miedema	(England) Arsenal
(United States) Megan Rapinoe	(United States) OL Reign

Ranking of other nominees

Rank	Player	Club(s)
Goalkeepers
2	(France) Sarah Bouhaddi	(France) Lyon
3	(United States) Nicole Barnhart	(United States) Utah Royals FC
4	(Germany) Friederike Abt	(Germany) VfL Wolfsburg
5	(Germany) Ann-Katrin Berger	(England) Chelsea
6	(Netherlands) Sari van Veenendaal	(Netherlands) PSV
7	(Germany) Laura Benkarth	(Germany) Bayern Munich
8	(Spain) Sandra Paños	(Spain) Barcelona
9	(United States) Alyssa Naeher	(United States) Chicago Red Stars
10	(Sweden) Hedvig Lindahl	(Spain) Atlético Madrid
Defenders
4	(Sweden) Magdalena Eriksson	(England) Chelsea
5	(Canada) Kadeisha Buchanan	(France) Lyon
6	(Australia) Ellie Carpenter	(France) Lyon
7	(United States) Crystal Dunn	(United States) Portland Thorns
8	(United States) Abby Dahlkemper	(United States) North Carolina Courage
9	(Spain) Irene Paredes	(France) Paris Saint-Germain
10	(Netherlands) Stefanie van der Gragt	(Spain) Barcelona; (Netherlands) Ajax
11	(Japan) Saki Kumagai	(France) Lyon
12	(United States) Ali Krieger	(United States) Orlando Pride
13	(Sweden) Nilla Fischer	(Sweden) Linköpings FC
14	(Italy) Sara Gama	(Italy) Juventus
15	(Poland) Paulina Dudek	(France) Paris Saint-Germain
Midfielders
4	(United States) Carli Lloyd	(United States) Sky Blue FC
5	(United States) Rose Lavelle	(United States) Washington Spirit; (England) Manchester City
6	(Germany) Dzsenifer Marozsán	(France) Lyon
7	(United States) Julie Ertz	(United States) Chicago Red Stars
8	(Netherlands) Daniëlle van de Donk	(England) Arsenal
9	(South Korea) Ji So-yun	(England) Chelsea
10	(Brazil) Formiga	(France) Paris Saint-Germain
11	(United States) Kelley O'Hara	(United States) Utah Royals FC
12	(France) Amandine Henry	(France) Lyon
13	(Norway) Caroline Graham Hansen	(Spain) Barcelona
14	(Costa Rica) Shirley Cruz	(Costa Rica) Alajuelense; (United States) OL Reign
15	(Scotland) Erin Cuthbert	(England) Chelsea
Forwards
5	(Sweden) Kosovare Asllani	(Spain) Real Madrid
6	(Norway) Ada Hegerberg	(France) Lyon
7	(Brazil) Cristiane	(Brazil) Santos
8	(Malawi) Tabitha Chawinga	(China) Jiangsu Suning
9	(Sweden) Stina Blackstenius	(Sweden) Göteborg FC
10	(Netherlands) Lieke Martens	(Spain) Barcelona
11	(Australia) Sam Kerr	(England) Chelsea
12	(France) Eugénie Le Sommer	(France) Lyon
13	(Spain) Jennifer Hermoso	(Spain) Barcelona
14	Bethany England	(England) Chelsea
15	(United States) Christen Press	(United States) Utah Royals FC; (England) Manchester United

== Selection panels ==
=== Men's selection panel ===
The panel of experts who shortlisted the nominees for The Best FIFA Football Awards 2020 for the men's players and coaches comprised:

- (Brazil) Cafu
- (Egypt) Essam El Hadary
- (Uruguay) Diego Forlán
- (Colombia) Faryd Mondragón
- (South Korea) Park Ji-sung
- (Germany) Bastian Schweinsteiger
- (Bulgaria) Hristo Stoichkov
- (Honduras) David Suazo
- (Ivory Coast) Yaya Touré
- (Spain) David Villa

=== Women's selection panel ===
The panel of experts who shortlisted the nominees for The Best FIFA Football Awards 2020 for the women's players and coaches comprised:

- (England) Rachel Brown
- (China) Han Duan
- (England) Jill Ellis
- (Scotland) Julie Fleeting
- (Argentina) Rosana Gómez
- (New Zealand) Amber Hearn
- (Germany) Steffi Jones
- (Sweden) Lotta Schelin
- (Namibia) Jacqui Shipanga
- (Canada) Melissa Tancredi
