= I Love My Country (game show) =

British television comedy panel game show

- Genre: Comedy panel game
- Based on: Ik hou van Holland by John de Mol Jr.
- Directed by: Peter Orton
- Presented by: Gabby Logan
- Starring: Frank Skinner; Micky Flanagan; Jamelia
- Composer: Chris Egan
- Country of origin: United Kingdom
- Original language: English
- No. of series: 1
- No. of episodes: 8 (list of episodes)

Production
- Executive producers: Richard Allen-Turner; Toby Stevens; Jon Thoday
- Producer: Spencer Millman
- Production location: Pinewood Studios
- Running time: 45 minutes
- Production companies: Avalon Television; Talpa; BBC Scotland

Original release
- Network: BBC One
- Release: 3 August – 28 September 2013

Related
- I Love My Country

I Love My Country is a British television comedy panel game shown on BBC One which began airing on 3 August 2013 and finished on 28 September 2013. The show was originally going to be hosted by David Walliams, but after the pilot, he dropped out due to other commitments. Gabby Logan was chosen to host the full series. Frank Skinner and Micky Flanagan act as the team captains, with four celebrities on each team on every episode. On 25 October 2013, it was announced that the show had been axed after the show had attracted largely negative press reviews and struggled in the ratings.

The theme song for the show was "One Vision" by Queen.

== Format ==
The show is based on the Dutch Ik hou van Holland format by Talpa, which has been sold to several countries via the I Love My Country franchise. Hosted by Gabby Logan, the show features two teams of four well-known celebrities, led by the team captains, Micky Flanagan and Frank Skinner. The aim of the game being to see how much they know about their country (the United Kingdom). Each team member takes part in a series of games and challenges. The team with the most points at the end of the show wins for that episode. The show features live music from a house band fronted by singer Jamelia.

== Episodes ==
The coloured backgrounds denote the result of each of the shows:

– indicates Frank's team won
– indicates Micky's team won

| No. | Frank's team | Micky's team | Original release date |
|---|---|---|---|
| 1 | Susanna Reid, Tom Ellis and Charlotte Salt | James Martin, Ricky Norwood and Helen George | 3 August 2013 |
| 2 | Len Goodman, Christine Bleakley and Jonnie Peacock | Larry Lamb, Melanie C and Chelsee Healey | 10 August 2013 |
| 3 | Michael Ball, Faye Tozer and Greg Rutherford | Sally Lindsay, Billy Boyd and Gemma Atkinson | 17 August 2013 |
| 4 | Eamonn Holmes, Iwan Thomas and Helen Flanagan | Dougie Poynter, Martine McCutcheon and Kelly Holmes | 24 August 2013 |
| 5 | Chris Packham, Rita Simons and Tinchy Stryder | Rachel Riley, Alex Jones and Peter Shilton | 31 August 2013 |
| 6 | Edith Bowman, Rebecca Adlington and Laurence Llewelyn-Bowen | Tyger Drew-Honey, Dan Walker and Kate Humble | 14 September 2013 |
| 7 | Brian Belo, Kelly Smith and Tina Hobley/Kenny Logan (Note: Kenny Logan was a last minute replacement when Tina Hobley fell ill during filming.) | Natalie Cassidy, Steve Backshall and Martin Kemp | 21 September 2013 |
| 8 | Jade Jones, Sara Cox and Duncan Bannatyne | Ashley Banjo, Will Mellor, and Patsy Palmer | 28 September 2013 |

=== Scores ===
| Frank | Micky |
|---|---|
Series wins (0 drawn)
| 0 | 1 |
Episode wins (0 drawn)
| 1 | 7 |

== Reception ==
The show received mostly negative reviews from critics. It was described as "a shapeless shambles", "idiot TV at its worst" and "little short of treason". Due to these overwhelmingly negative reviews and bad ratings, the show was subsequently axed by the BBC.
