= Terry Yorath =

Welsh football player and manager (1950–2026)

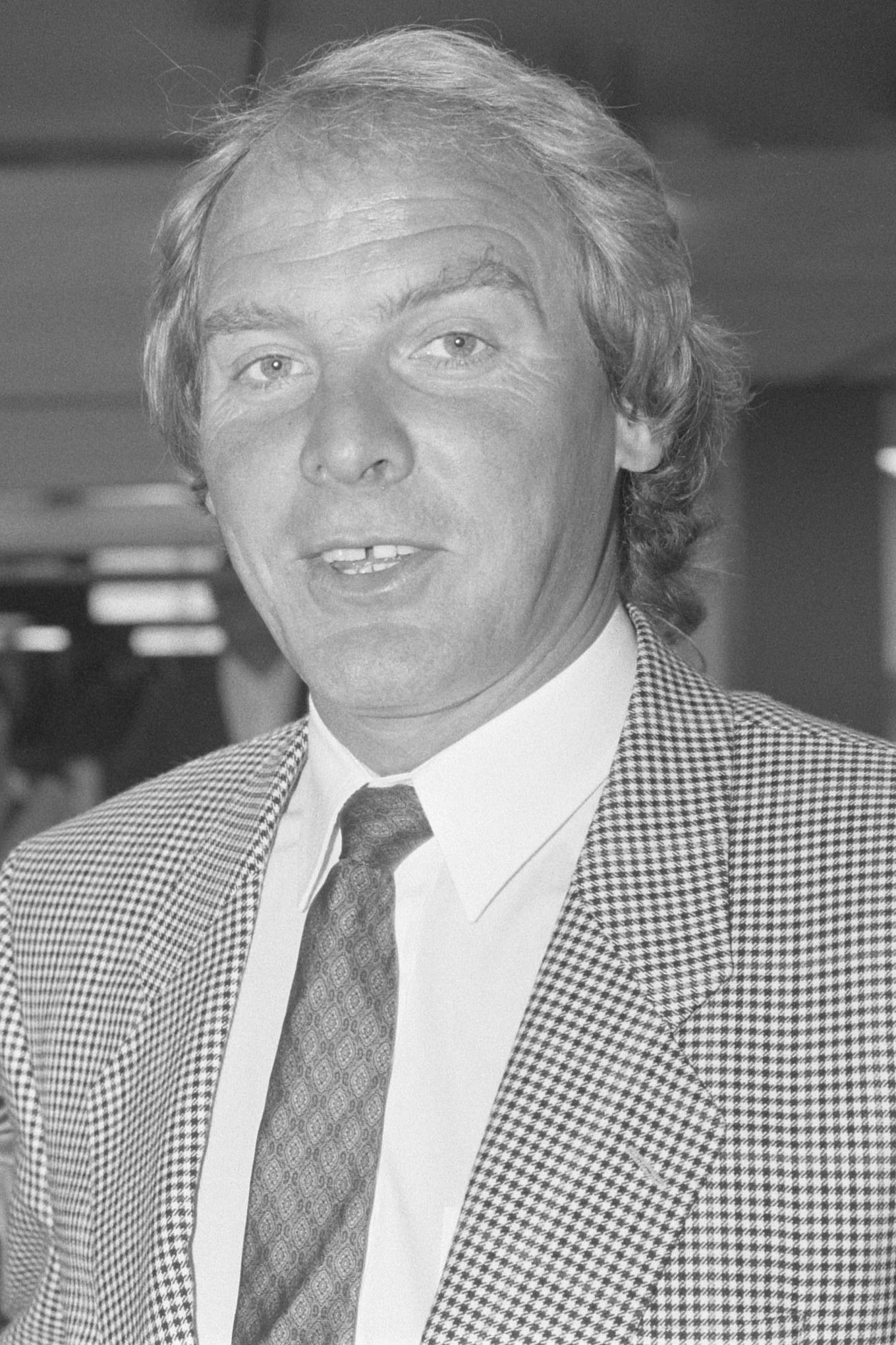
- Yorath in 1988

Personal information
- Full name: Terence Charles Yorath
- Date of birth: 27 March 1950
- Place of birth: Cardiff, Wales
- Date of death: 7 January 2026 (aged 75)
- Place of death: Leeds, England
- Height: 5 ft 10 in (1.78 m)
- Position: Midfielder

Youth career
- Leeds United

Senior career*
Years	Team	Apps	(Gls)
1967–1976	Leeds United	141	(10)
1976–1979	Coventry City	99	(3)
1979–1981	Tottenham Hotspur	46	(1)
1981–1982	Vancouver Whitecaps	29	(2)
1982–1985	Bradford City	27	(0)
1986	Swansea City	1	(0)
Total		343	(16)

International career
1969–1981	Wales	59	(2)

Managerial career
- 1986–1989: Swansea City
- 1988–1993: Wales
- 1989–1990: Bradford City
- 1990–1991: Swansea City
- 1994–1995: Cardiff City
- 1995–1997: Lebanon
- 2001–2002: Sheffield Wednesday
- 2008–2009: Margate
- * Club domestic league appearances and goals

Terence Charles Yorath (27 March 1950 – 7 January 2026) was a Welsh professional football player and manager at both club and international level.

Yorath represented Leeds United, Coventry City, Tottenham Hotspur, Vancouver Whitecaps, Bradford City, Swansea City and the Welsh national team. He later became a football manager for Bradford City, Swansea City, Cardiff City and Sheffield Wednesday, as well as assistant at Huddersfield Town. Yorath also managed the Wales and Lebanon national teams.

== Club career ==
=== Early career ===
Yorath was an apprentice at Leeds United, signing professional forms in 1967 at the age of 17; he made his debut against Burnley at Turf Moor on 11 May 1968. Alongside other Leeds midfield players of the time, such as Mick Bates and Terry Hibbitt, he found it difficult to establish himself ahead of Don Revie's preferred pairing of Billy Bremner and Johnny Giles.

=== Leeds United ===
In the 1972–73 season, injuries and suspensions allowed Yorath to establish himself as a first team regular; his first season ended with two cup final runners-up medals. He was a substitute in the 1973 FA Cup Final, which Leeds lost 1–0 to Sunderland, and also appeared in the 1973 UEFA Cup Winners' Cup Final, which Leeds lost in controversial circumstances to AC Milan.

Yorath finally won some silverware the following 1973–74 season, where he was a key member of the Leeds championship winning side. Yorath became the first Welshman to play in a European Cup final when Leeds reached the final of the UEFA European Cup, but again he ended up with a runners up medal as Leeds lost 2–0 to Bayern Munich in controversial circumstances.

Don Revie had left Leeds to manage England, and his eventual replacement Jimmy Armfield decided to dispense with Yorath's services in 1976, selling him to Coventry City for £125,000. During his time with Leeds, Yorath made 199 appearances and scored eleven goals.

=== Coventry City and later career ===
Yorath remained at Coventry for three years, playing 99 games and scoring three goals. He moved to Tottenham Hotspur in August 1979 for the sum of £300,000. Yorath's debut occurred on 18 August 1979 which was a Football League game against Middlesbrough in which Tottenham lost 3–1. In February 1981 he transferred to Vancouver Whitecaps in the North American Soccer League. He served as the captain of the Whitecaps for two seasons, before returning to the UK in 1982.

== International career ==
Yorath picked up the first of 59 Welsh caps in 1970 against Italy, and he maintained a regular presence in the international side until 1981. Yorath also captained his country on 42 occasions.

== Managerial career ==
In 1982, Yorath joined Bradford City as player/coach and made 34 appearances as a player; he was injured during the Bradford City stadium fire disaster in 1985 when he was forced to jump out of a window after evacuating supporters from a bar. He subsequently took up the manager's position at Swansea City in 1986 (making a single and final league appearance), and led the club to promotion from the Division Four to the Division Three at the end of the 1987–88 season.

In 1988, he was appointed part-time manager of Wales, eventually taking up the post on a full-time basis while still managing Swansea. However, he later left Swansea to return to Bradford, this time as assistant manager to Paul Jewell, whilst still taking on Wales duties. He was dismissed by Bradford after just one year in charge, and returned to manage Swansea again.

In 1991, after a run of nine consecutive defeats, he left Swansea for a second time to concentrate on managing Wales. Under Yorath, Wales attained what was then their highest ever FIFA World Ranking of 27th in August 1993 and came close to qualifying for the 1994 World Cup tournament. Following the failure to qualify, Yorath's contract as manager was not renewed, angering many Welsh fans.

Yorath joined Cardiff City as general manager in 1994, after speculation that he would become manager of Middlesbrough in May that year, and assumed control of team affairs in November of that year when manager Eddie May left the club. However, his time in the hotseat with the Bluebirds was brief, and he was sacked in March 1995. In April of the same year, Yorath took over as coach of the Lebanon national team, and helped them rise 60 places in the FIFA rankings before leaving in 1997.

Between 1997 and 2000, he worked as a coach at Huddersfield Town and Bradford City, before joining Sheffield Wednesday. He resigned from this position in 2002.

In June 2008, Yorath returned to football when he was appointed the director of football at Isthmian League Premier Division side Margate, where his brother Dai and nephew Dean had both played. On 21 November 2008, he was appointed manager of the club after Barry Ashby was sacked; he resigned as Margate manager on 24 September 2009.

== Personal life and death ==
Yorath was the father of the television presenter Gabby Logan. His eldest son, Daniel, died aged 15 from hypertrophic cardiomyopathy after playing football with Yorath in their back garden in 1992.

His autobiography, published in 2004, is titled Hard Man, Hard Knocks.

Yorath died on 7 January 2026, aged 75, following a short illness. His daughter, Gabby, had been presenting Match of the Day live during the evening but was replaced mid broadcast by Mark Chapman, who noted Logan had to attend a "family emergency".

== Honours ==
=== Player ===
Leeds United

- Football League First Division: 1973–74
- FA Cup runner-up: 1972–73
- European Cup runner-up: 1974–75
- European Cup Winners' Cup runner-up: 1972–73

Bradford City

- Football League Third Division: 1984–85

=== Manager ===
Swansea City

- Football League Fourth Division play-offs: 1988

Lebanon

- Arab Games third place: 1997

== Works cited ==
- Soar, Phil (1995). Tottenham Hotspur: The Official Illustrated History 1882–1995. Hamlyn. ISBN 0-600-58706-1.
- Goodwin, Bob (1992). The Spurs Alphabet. ACL & Polar Publishing (UK) Ltd. ISBN 0-9514862-8-4.
