= Ik hou van Holland =

Dutch television game show

- Genre: Game show
- Presented by: Linda de Mol
- Starring: Jeroen van Koningsbrugge (season 1- ) Beau van Erven Dorens (season 1-3); Peter Heerschop (season 4-6); Irene Moors (specials, season 4-6); Guus Meeuwis (season 7-15); Leo Alkemade (season 16- )
- Country of origin: The Netherlands
- No. of seasons: 12
- No. of episodes: 101

Production
- Executive producer: Gijs van Dam
- Running time: 90 minutes (including commercials)
- Production company: Talpa Media

Original release
- Network: RTL 4
- Release: 8 March 2008 – 20 December 2014
- Network: SBS6
- Release: 2019 – present

Ik hou van Holland (English: I love Holland) is a Dutch game show, presented by Linda de Mol. It is broadcasting during prime time, on Saturday nights on RTL 4. The show tests Dutch celebrities on their knowledge of the Netherlands. Present day it is taken over by SBS and will broadcast a new season from September 2019.

The show opened with the tune of the tango song after which it was named, "Ik hou van Holland", by Willy Schootemeijer. The song, sung in Dutch, was a hit in the 1930s for the Austro-Hungarian tenor Joseph Schmidt and, in the early 1970s, by the Dutch boy singer Heintje (his version is used in the theme song).

== Format ==
The series was contested by two teams, captained by Jeroen van Koningsbrugge and Guus Meeuwis. Formerly, Beau van Erven Dorens (season 1-3) and Peter Heerschop (season 4-6) were team captains. Every episode there are new celebrity team members.

The goal was to win as many points as possible by answering questions about Dutch culture and spelling relatively difficult Dutch words correctly, among other challenges.

The format of the show was the basis for the BBC 1 show I Love My Country, first broadcast in August 2013, as well as many other international editions via the I Love My Country franchise.

== Play rounds ==
The important rounds are, in order of play:

- TV questions
- Guessing a song's title and performer
  - Mr. Hoi Chi Cheung (season 4&6)
  - Songs with pictures (since season 4)
  - Translating (since season 5)
- What we know about the country (season 2-3)
- What does he ask? (season 4)
- "In Holland staat een huis" (± "There's a house in Holland", after the Dutch children's song) (only during the Koninginnedag-special of 2009)
- Dutch language
  - Spell a word
  - Guessing a difficult Dutch word (season 1-4)
  - Chinese whispers (since season 5)
- What shall we eat? (season 1)
- Guessing well-known Dutchman/Dutchwoman
- The lists
- Topography
- Dutchman of the year (only during the New Year's Eve of 2008)
- Sports and news questions (RTL fragments during the 'Viert 20 jaar RTL' special & Sinterklaas fragments during the Sinterklaas special of 2009) (only sports questions: season 1-3)
- Final (spin the wheel: since season 2)

== Seasons ==
Season	Presenter	Captains		Episodes	Start		End		Viewers
Season	Presenter	Team 1 (red-white-blue)	Team 2 (orange)	Episodes	Date	Viewers start	Date	Viewers end	Viewers
1	Linda de Mol	Jeroen van Koningsbrugge	Beau van Erven Dorens	7	8 March 2008	1,226	19 April 2008	1,502	1.358.000
2	Linda de Mol	Jeroen van Koningsbrugge	Beau van Erven Dorens	6	8 November 2008	1,445	13 December 2008	1,877	1.466.000
3	Linda de Mol	Jeroen van Koningsbrugge	Beau van Erven Dorens	6	7 March 2009	1,522	18 April 2009	1,442	1.594.000
4	Linda de Mol	Jeroen van Koningsbrugge	Peter Heerschop	5	31 October 2009	2,183	28 November 2009	2,019	2.052.000
5	Linda de Mol	Jeroen van Koningsbrugge	Peter Heerschop	8	6 March 2010	1,957	24 April 2010	2,192	2.172.000
6	Linda de Mol	Jeroen van Koningsbrugge	Peter Heerschop	11	2 October 2010	2,300	11 December 2010	2,537	2.434.000
7	Linda de Mol	Jeroen van Koningsbrugge	Guus Meeuwis	8	26 March 2011	2,711	14 May 2011	2,425	2.363.000
8	Linda de Mol	Jeroen van Koningsbrugge	Guus Meeuwis	9	24 September 2011	2,193	19 November 2011	2,501	2.538.000
9	Linda de Mol	Jeroen van Koningsbrugge	Guus Meeuwis	8	25 February 2012	2,421	14 April 2012	2,458	2.575.000
10	Linda de Mol	Jeroen van Koningsbrugge	Guus Meeuwis	8	20 October 2012	2,397	8 December 2012	2,221	2.288.000
11	Linda de Mol	Jeroen van Koningsbrugge	Guus Meeuwis	8	31 August 2013	1,762	19 October 2013	2,063	1.920.000
12	Linda de Mol	Jeroen van Koningsbrugge	Guus Meeuwis	7	8 November 2014	2,079	20 December 2014	2,002	

=== Specials ===
Dutch name	English	Year
Sinterklaas	Saint Nicholas (Santa Claus)	2008, 2009, 2010, 2012
Oudejaarsavond	New Year's Eve	2008-2014
Koninginnedag	Queen's day	2009 & 2010
20 Jaar RTL	20 Years RTL	2009
WK Voetbal	Worldchampionship soccer	2010
Ik Hou Van Beatrix	I Love Beatrix	2013
Ik Hou Van RTL / 25 Jaar RTL	I Love RTL / 25 Years RTL	2014
