= ITN ON =

British news provider

ITN ON is a division of British news provider ITN. It creates and distributes news, entertainment and lifestyle content across a wide range of media outlets.

Formerly known as ITN Multimedia, ITN ON came into being in 2003, providing the first video news bulletin for third generation (3G) mobiles for operator 3. It has since expanded its video news service to Vodafone live!, O2, MobiTV, ROK TV, Orange and T-Mobile. ITN ON offers a range of news and entertainment and lifestyle content to online operators including Google, YouTube, Yahoo!, Bebo, Bauer Media, Emirates, MSN, Telegraph Media Group, blinkx, Channel 4 News and the first local newspaper group to sign to the service Midland News Association.

ITN ON was the first European company to create made-for-mobile video news content; a mobile-specific 24-hour news channel was launched on MobiTV in May 2005. This was quickly followed by a made-for-mobile weather channel. ITN ON launched the first ever video news application for Apple’s iPhone in February 2009.
