= Gabby Logan =

Welsh TV/radio presenter and rhythmic gymnast (born 1973)

Gabby Logan OBE
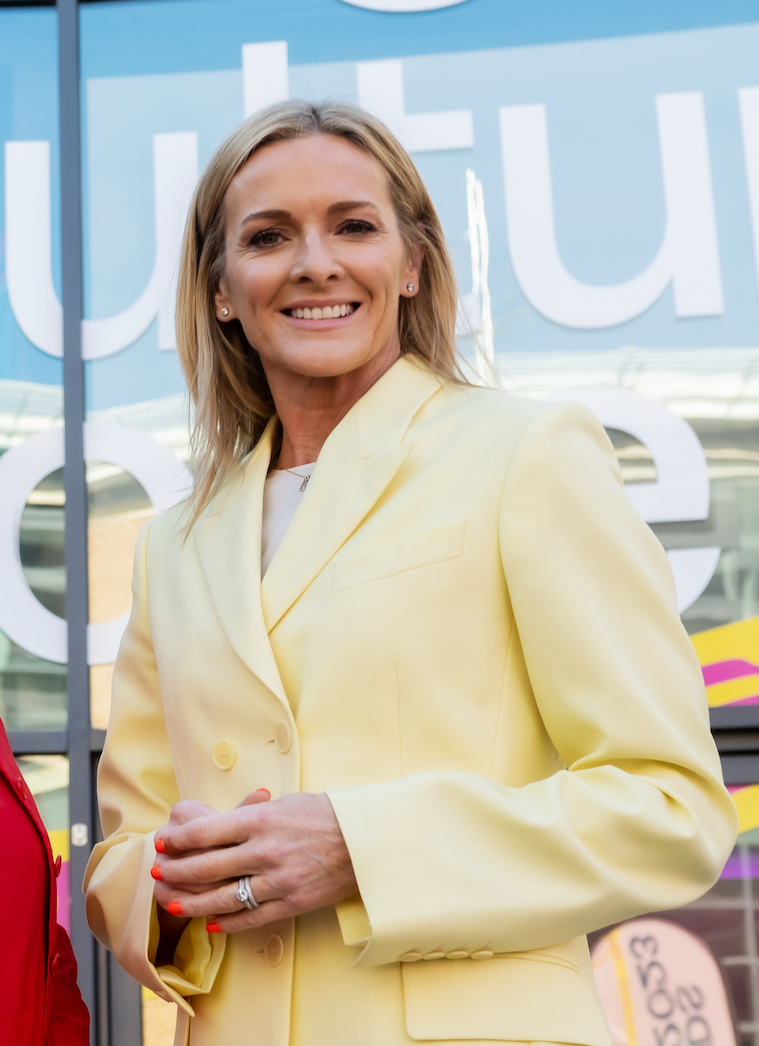
- Logan in 2023
- Born: Gabrielle Nicole Yorath; 24 April 1973 (age 53); Leeds, West Riding of Yorkshire, England
- Education: Durham University
- Occupations: Television and radio presenter
- Years active: 1995–present
- Employer(s): BBC (current); ITV (former); Channel 5 (former); Sky Sports (former)
- Known for: Gymnast, television presenter
- Spouse: Kenny Logan (m. 2001)
- Children: 2, including Reuben
- Father: Terry Yorath
- Sports career
- Country: United Kingdom (Wales)
- Sport: Gymnastics
- Event: 1990 Commonwealth Games: Rhythmic Individual All-Around
- Website: www.gabbylogan.com

Gabrielle Nicole Logan (née Yorath; born 24 April 1973) is a Welsh television and radio presenter, and a former rhythmic gymnast who represented Wales and Great Britain. She hosted Final Score for BBC Sport from 2009 until 2013. She has also presented live sports events for the BBC, including a revived episode of Superstars in December 2012 and the London Marathon since 2015. Since 2013, she has co-hosted Sports Personality of the Year for the BBC and she presented the second series of The Edge in 2015.

In August 2025, Logan became one of three presenters of Match of the Day, alongside Mark Chapman and Kelly Cates.

== Early life ==
Gabrielle Nicole Yorath was born on 24 April 1973 in Leeds in the West Riding of Yorkshire to former Wales international footballer and manager Terry Yorath, who was playing for Leeds United at the time, and his wife, Christine. The family moved frequently because her father played for a number of British teams as well as in Canada with the Vancouver Whitecaps.

Logan was educated at Cardinal Heenan High School and Notre Dame Sixth Form College in Leeds. She studied law at the University of Durham.

She played netball at school and at university and also competed in the high jump. At the 1990 Commonwealth Games in Auckland, 16-year-old Logan's rhythmic gymnastics routine finished eighth and she placed eleventh in rhythmic gymnastics representing Wales. She retired from rhythmic gymnastics, at the age of 17, due to sciatica.

She became interested in football during her regular attendances at her father's matches. Her mother went out of a "sense of duty". Along with her brother and sister, she was in the crowd at Valley Parade on 11 May 1985, the day of the Bradford City stadium fire. She had left the stand only moments before the fire took hold and watched the unfolding disaster.

Her debut TV appearance was when she was chosen as the Leeds Rose for the 1991 Rose of Tralee competition.

== Career ==
=== Radio ===
In 1992, while studying law at Durham University, Logan worked part time at Metro Radio in Newcastle and for Tyne Tees Television, on their, new in January 1996, lifestyle programme Tyne Tees Tonight.

=== Sky Sports ===
In 1996, she accepted a job as a presenter on Sky Sports. She worked there until 1998, when she joined the ITV TV network.

=== ITV ===
On 5 September 1998, ITV resurrected the football magazine series On the Ball, a lunchtime preview of the day's football fixtures, presented by Logan as Gabby Yorath. Logan was one of a small number of female sports presenters on terrestrial television. After ITV lost the terrestrial rights to the Premier League, she presented their UEFA Champions League coverage, including the 2005 and 2006 finals, between A.C. Milan and Liverpool, and Arsenal and Barcelona, respectively. Logan left ITV for BBC Sport in December 2006, In 2003, she reported on the Rugby World Cup. Also that year, Logan presented a programme called Britain's Brilliant Prodigies featuring a young Jessie J.

Logan stepped in for Melanie Sykes on 6 July 2004 when she went on maternity leave partway through the third series of game show The Vault.

She co-hosted the celebrity diving show Splash! on ITV, alongside Vernon Kay and Olympic diver Tom Daley from 2013 until 2014.

In 2015, Logan returned to ITV for reality series Flockstars, a show she later said was her "biggest disappointment".

=== BBC ===
Logan started presenting for BBC Sport on 27 January 2007, presenting coverage of the FA Cup fourth round tie between Luton Town and Blackburn Rovers. She continues to regularly present and report on live football for the BBC, including hosting Final Score from 2009 until 2013. She reported from the England Camp for the 2010 World Cup, Euro 2012 and World Cup 2014 while also being a pitchside reporter at England matches.

In 2008 Logan replaced Craig Doyle as host of the BBC's Six Nations Championship coverage. She had previously reported on the 2003 Rugby World Cup for ITV.

Logan became the main host of athletics for BBC Sport. She has hosted live coverage of the World Athletics Championships in 2013, and the European Athletics Championships and Commonwealth Games in 2014. She has also hosted the annual IAAF Diamond League competition.

Logan has hosted BBC Summer Olympic Games coverage since 2008. At Beijing 2008, Logan presented Games Today, a nightly evening highlights show on BBC One from 7pm to 8pm. At the London 2012 Games, Logan again hosted the highlights programme, this time from 10.35pm to midnight. For the Rio 2016 Games, Logan was live each day from the Estádio Olímpico Nilton Santos leading the athletics coverage. For the Tokyo 2020 Games, due to the Coronavirus pandemic, the BBC team could not travel, so Logan instead lead daytime coverage alongside Hazel Irvine. For the Paris 2024 Olympics, Logan was once again trackside at the Stade de France.

Logan has presented coverage of the Commonwealth Games for the BBC since 2014. At the Glasgow 2014 Games, Logan lead the athletics coverage at the event. For the Gold Coast 2018 Games, Logan presented coverage of events from Salford. At the Birmingham 2022 Games, Logan anchored coverage of the athletics events once again.

She has also hosted live coverage of other sporting events such as the 2013 Aquatics World Championships

Since 2009, Logan has been a frequent stand-in presenter on The One Show on BBC One. Logan stated that she was once criticised by a BBC executive for wearing "too sexy boots".

In August 2013, Logan began hosting the BBC One series I Love My Country, featuring team captains Micky Flanagan and Frank Skinner on Saturday evenings. In October 2013, the programme was axed due to largely negative press reviews and poor viewing figures.

In September 2013, the BBC announced that, as of 2013, Logan would replace Sue Barker as one of the presenters for the annual BBC Sports Personality of the Year.

In March 2015, Logan hosted Let's Play Darts for Comic Relief for BBC Two. The show returned for a second series in February 2016.

She presented live coverage of the 2015 London Marathon, broadcast on BBC One on 26 April, the 2016 London Marathon on 24 April and the 2017 London Marathon on 23 April. In August 2015, she was the main presenter for BBC's coverage of the IAAF World Championships in Athletics from Beijing.

Logan presented the second series of the BBC game show The Edge in 2015. She replaced Mark Benton who hosted series 1.

In 2016, Logan was part of the presenting team for The Invictus Games on BBC One. She was also a part of the media team during the BBC's coverage of the 2016 UEFA European Championship in France.

In 2017 she hosted the BBC IAAF coverage in London.

In 2022 Logan hosted coverage of the Women's Six Nations Championship.

Having deputised for Gary Lineker many times on Match of the Day, Logan was announced in January 2025 as one of three new presenters of the show, alongside Mark Chapman and Kelly Cates, following Lineker's decision to quit.

=== Channel 5 ===
In June 2011, while still presenting the sports results shows for BBC One on Saturdays, Logan joined Channel 5 to present a discussion and magazine show following The Wright Stuff at 11:10 am each weekday initially called The Wright Stuff Extra, and later renamed as Live with Gabby. On 5 April 2012, the show tweeted to confirm that Logan was leaving the programme.

== Filmography ==
=== Television ===
Year	Title	Channel	Role	Notes
1998–2004	On the Ball	ITV	Presenter	
2002	Loose Women	ITV	Guest presenter	Two episodes
2003	Britain's Brilliant Prodigies	ITV	Presenter	
2004	The Vault	ITV	Presenter	
2007	Strictly Come Dancing	BBC One	Contestant	
2007–2011	Inside Sport	BBC One	Presenter	
2008–	BBC Six Nations Coverage	BBC One	Presenter	
2009–2013	Final Score	BBC One	Presenter	
2009–2010, 2013–	The One Show	BBC One	Stand-in presenter	
2010–	A League of Their Own	Sky 1	Regular Panellist	
2011–2012	The Wright Stuff Extra	Channel 5	Presenter	Later renamed Live with Gabby Logan
2012	Superstars	BBC One	Presenter	One-off episode
2012	New Year Live	BBC One	Presenter	Succeeded Jake Humphrey
2012–	Match of the Day	BBC One	Presenter	Stand-in presenter
2013	I Love My Country	BBC One	Presenter	BBC panel game show
2013–2014	Splash!	ITV	Co-presenter	Primetime reality series; with Vernon Kay
2013–	BBC Sports Personality of the Year	BBC One	Co-presenter	With Gary Lineker and Clare Balding
2013–	BBC Athletics Coverage	BBC One	Presenter	
2014	Sport Relief	BBC One	Co-presenter	'Clash of the Titans' segment
2015	Flockstars	ITV	Presenter	Primetime reality series
2015	The Edge	BBC One	Presenter	Daytime game show
2015–	London Marathon	BBC One	Presenter	2015, 2016, 2017, 2024, 2025 & 2026
2015–2016	Let's Play Darts	BBC Two	Presenter	Primetime series
2016	Invictus Games	BBC One	Co-presenter	
2016	UEFA Euro 2016	BBC One	Co-presenter / Correspondent	June 2016
2016–	The Premier League Show	BBC Two	Presenter	
2018	Gabby & Gareth's Big 6 Nations Kick-Off	BBC	Co-presenter	
2019	Would I Lie to You?	BBC One	Guest	Series 13 Episode 1
2022	Freeze the Fear with Wim Hof	BBC One	Participant	
2022	2022 Commonwealth Games	BBC One	Presenter	Alongside Clare Balding and Hazel Irvine
2022	UEFA Women's Euro 2022	BBC One & BBC Two	Presenter	Alongside Reshmin Chowdhury and Eilidh Barbour
2022	2022 FIFA World Cup	BBC One & BBC Two	Presenter	
2023	2023 FIFA Women's World Cup	BBC One & BBC Two	Presenter	Alongside Reshmin Chowdhury and Alex Scott
2023	Great North Run	BBC One	Presenter	Live coverage
2024	UEFA Euro 2024	BBC One	Presenter	Alternating with Gary Lineker
2024	2024 Summer Olympics	BBC One & BBC Two	Presenter	Part of the commentary team
2024	Pointless	BBC One	Guest presenter	
2025–	Match of the Day	BBC One	Presenter	Alternating with Mark Chapman & Kelly Cates
2025	2025 London Marathon: My Reason to Run	BBC One	Presenter	One-off programme
2025	UEFA Women's Euro 2025	BBC One	Presenter	Alongside Alex Scott and Jeanette Kwakye
2025	Women’s Rugby World Cup 2025	BBC One & BBC Two	Presenter	Alternating with Ugo Monye

=== Guest appearances ===
- Who Wants to Be a Millionaire? (2002, 2010, 2021)
- Celebrity Stars in Their Eyes (2002)
- All Star Family Fortunes (2006)
- 8 Out of 10 Cats (2008, 2010, 2012, 2014, 2016)
- Would I Lie to You? (2008, 2009, 2012, 2015, 2017, 2019)
- Never Mind the Buzzcocks (2009, 2015)
- They Think It's All Over: Comic Relief Special (2011)
- Wall of Fame (2011)
- Shooting Stars (2011)
- Room 101 (2012, 2017)
- The Angelos Epithemiou Show (2012)
- The Big Fat Quiz of the Year (2012)
- All Star Mr & Mrs (2013)
- The Last Leg (2013)
- Was It Something I Said? (2013)
- Have I Got News for You (2013)
- That Puppet Game Show (2014)
- Through the Keyhole (2014)
- Pointless Celebrities (2015, 2016)
- Celebrity Squares (2015)
- Alan Carr's 12 Stars of Christmas (2016)
- Insert Name Here (2017)
- Jack Dee's Inauguration Helpdesk (2017)
- Don't Ask Me Ask Britain (2017)
- Britain's Favourite Dogs: Top 100 (2018)
- Richard Osman's House of Games (2021)
- The Wheel (2021, 2024, 2025)
- Blankety Blank (2022)
- The John Bishop Show (2023)
- Celebrity Catchphrase (2023)
- The Great Celebrity Bake Off for Stand Up To Cancer (2024)

== Radio ==
Logan has worked on BBC Radio 5 Live, where she presented a lunchtime show from January 2010. Her previous Sunday morning was taken over by Kate Silverton.

In light of the move of BBC Radio 5 Live from London to MediaCityUK in Salford, Logan left her weekday show in April 2011 due to other BBC work and family commitments. She was replaced by Shelagh Fogarty.

On 12 April 2009, she presented the BBC Radio 4 Appeal on behalf of St John's Catholic School for the Deaf.

== Political views ==
In August 2014, Logan was one of 200 public figures who were signatories to a letter to The Guardian expressing their hope that Scotland would vote to remain part of the United Kingdom in September's referendum on that issue.

== Other work ==
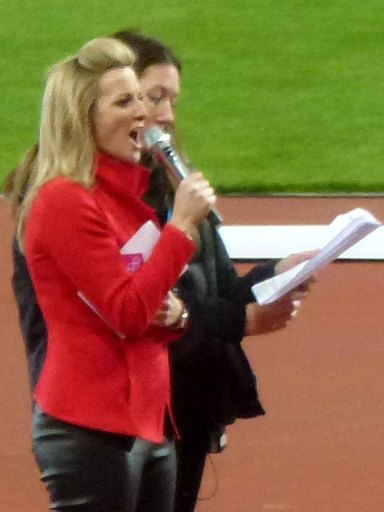
Gabby Logan hosting the London Olympic Stadium opening ceremony in 2012.

In December 2012, Logan was appointed as a non-executive director of Perform Group.

In 2014, Logan helped launch Tesco's Farm to Fork initiative.

Logan is the voice-over for the MegaRed heart health commercial advertisements.

Logan's memoir, The First Half, was published in October of 2022.

== Honours, awards and recognition ==
Logan won "Sports Presenter of the Year" four times at the Television and Radio Industries Club (TRIC) awards in 2000, 2002, 2004, and in 2014, and once at the inaugural Broadcast Sport Awards in 2022

Her work with the BBC Athletics team won "Sports Programme" at the 2014 RTS Awards. In addition, her work with the presenting team for the Commonwealth Games and Women's Euros saw both shortlisted for RTS "Sports Programme" Award in 2023. The Midpoint with Gabby Logan was nominated at the British Podcast Awards for best Branded (in 2021) and best Wellbeing (in 2024) podcast.

Outside sports, Logan was crowned "Tesco Celebrity Mum of the Year" in March 2012. and Yorkshire Woman of the Year by the Yorkshire Society in 2023.

Upon becoming one of the first female sports anchors to break into terrestrial television in the 1990s, Logan received praise from fellow professionals such as Terry Venables, Ally McCoist and Des Lynam. Her natural style of broadcasting, combined with her relaxed demeanor and ability to banter with whichever ex-pro she is paired with, has made Logan a popular figure on TV.

Logan was appointed Member of the Order of the British Empire (MBE) in the 2020 New Year Honours for services to sports broadcasting and the promotion of women in sport. She was later appointed Officer of the Order of the British Empire (OBE) in the 2026 New Year Honours for services to Sports Broadcasting and to Charity.

Logan's name is one of those featured on the sculpture Ribbons, unveiled in 2024.

=== List of awards and nominations ===
Year	Category	Nominated for	Result	Ref.
2000	TRIC Awards	Sports Presenter / Reporter	Won	
2002	TRIC Awards	Sports Presenter / Reporter	Won	
2004	TRIC Awards	Sports Presenter / Reporter	Won	
2007	TRIC Awards	Sports Presenter	Nominated	
2008	TRIC Awards	Sports Presenter	Nominated	
2010	TRIC Awards	Sports Presenter	Nominated	
2013	Yorkshire Women in Achievements	Yorkshire Rose	Won	
2014	TRIC Awards	Sports Presenter	Won	
2014	National TV Awards	Most Popular Entertainment Presenter	Longlisted	
2014	RTS Awards	Sports Presenter, Commentator or Pundit	Nominated	
2016	WFTV Awards	Presenter Award	Won	
2019	BSJ Awards	Sports Presenter	Nominated	
2021	RTS Awards	Sports Presenter, Commentator or Pundit	Nominated	
2022	Broadcast Sport Awards	Sports Presenter of the Year	Won	
2022	RTS Awards	Sports Presenter, Commentator or Pundit	Nominated	
2022	BSJ Awards	Sports Presenter	Nominated	
2023	Broadcast Sport Awards	Sports Presenter of the Year	Nominated	
2023	RTS Awards	Sports Presenter, Commentator or Pundit	Nominated	
2023	BSJ Awards	Sports Presenter	Nominated	
2024	RTS Awards	Sports Presenter, Commentator or Pundit	Nominated	
2024	British Podcast Awards	Best Host	Nominated	
2024	Broadcast Sport Awards	Sports Presenter of the Year	Won	
2025	National Reality TV Awards	Best TV Presenter	Nominated	
2025	BSJ Awards	Sports Presenter	Nominated	
2026	BSJ Awards	Presenter of the Year	Won	

== Personal life ==
In 1992, Logan's 15-year-old brother Daniel (born 1976) collapsed and died from hypertrophic cardiomyopathy after playing football with his dad in their back garden. Logan has actively appealed for the Daniel Yorath Appeal, which raises funds for the treatment and detection of the condition.

At age 17, Logan had a relationship with 28-year-old married Olympic runner Gary Staines.

Logan married former Scotland international rugby union player Kenny Logan on 19 July 2001 at Logie Kirk in Blairlogie, Stirling. She has said that meeting her husband was a motivation to exercise regularly again. The couple live in Penn, Buckinghamshire, having moved there from Kew, south-west London in 2013.

On 28 July 2005, after undergoing IVF treatment, Logan gave birth to twins: a son, Reuben, and a daughter.

In June 2012, Logan was named by The Times newspaper as one of several people to have put money into a film and tax avoidance scheme.

In January 2013, Logan was named the first Chancellor of Leeds Trinity University. In November 2017 it was announced that Logan would step down from this role in January 2018 after five years.

Logan runs and plays golf. She is a supporter of Newcastle United, dating back to her time at Durham University, when her boyfriend was a fan. She remembers her first match as Newcastle's 1–0 Premier League victory over Everton on 25 August 1993 and made visits by air or rail to St James' Park throughout the 1990s and early 2000s, including Newcastle's 5–0 win over Manchester United on 20 October 1996.

=== Charity ===
Logan is currently a patron of Brainkind, The Prince's Trust, St John's Catholic School for the Deaf, Great Ormond Street Hospital and Newcastle United Foundation. She was named the President of Muscular Dystrophy UK in 2018. She and her husband Kenny Logan are past presidents of the children's charity Sparks.
