= James Horncastle =

English sports broadcaster & journalist

James Horncastle OSI (born 1983 or 1984) is an English sportswriter and broadcaster. He specializes in European and Italian football and frequently covers football for TNT Sports.

== Career ==
Horncastle began writing Serie B match reports for the Football Italia website. He appeared weekly on the TNT Sports European Football Show until its cancellation in 2017 and is now a regular weekly pundit on their Champions League Goals Show.

In addition to appearing weekly on British television, Horncastle writes in English and Italian for newspapers and websites including The Guardian, the Daily Mirror, The Daily Telegraph, The Times, The Independent, The Blizzard, Eurosport and the Liverpool Echo.

According to Forbes, he was the first to break the $828m purchase of AC Milan by Chinese investors from Silvio Berlusconi.

He appears weekly as a European expert for BBC Radio 5 Live's Euro Leagues show with Mina Rzouki, Julien Laurens, and Raphael Honigstein. He also produces columns for BBC Sport. He has contributed to The Athletic, Talksport, The Anfield Wrap, ESPN, the A.S. Roma website, Off The Ball and FourFourTwo. He is now a regular on 'Golazzo' for The Totally Football Show with James Richardson and Gabriele Marcotti and has appeared as a guest at Totally Football live shows in England and Ireland. He has appeared on the panel at Gazzetta Football Italia live shows with James Richardson. Horncastle contributes weekly to The Football Ramble's 'On The Continent' podcast, and was a regular on the Football Weekly podcast and live shows.

Horncastle is in the process of writing and publishing a book about former Italian football player Roberto Baggio, titled It Isn't Sunday Anymore: In Search of Roberto Baggio. It is expected to be published on 29 August 2027.

== Personal life ==
Horncastle speaks fluent Italian and lived in Rome. He is a Leeds United and AS Roma fan.

Horncastle is easily recognisable on T.V. and other media due to his affinity for wearing turtleneck sweaters with suits as well as sporting grown out hair after being influenced and inspired by Dave Grohl and Gabriel Batistuta.
