= Daniel Storey =

British journalist and author

Daniel Storey is a British journalist and author. He is the Chief Football Writer at the i (newspaper).

The Deputy Editor of Football365 until October 2018, Storey was named the Football Supporters Federation ‘Football Writer of the Year’ for 2016.

He has written for The Independent The Set Pieces, The Daily Mirror, The Guardian, Sky Sports and Vice. He has written regularly for the Irish Examiner. Storey has contributed long pieces to the BBC Sport website.

Storey is a regular on the ‘Football Fives’ podcast and has appeared on Talksport, BT Sport and The Anfield Wrap. He appears regularly on The Totally Football Show and has guested on The Athletic’s Football Cliches podcast.

His book ‘A Portrait of an Icon’ was published by Ockley Books and all profits were donated to the Sir Bobby Robson Foundation. His audio book about Paul Gascoigne and his time spent playing in Italy for S.S. Lazio has been narrated by former Football Italia presenter James Richardson. It was also serialised on TalkSport. The book was published in physical form by HarperCollins in late 2018.

Storey’s 2019 release is a book about controversial Frenchman Eric Cantona and Manchester United, entitled 250 Days: Cantona’s Kung Fu and the Making of Man U. The book looks at Cantona’s attack on a Crystal Palace FC fan at Selhurst Park, the subsequent custodial sentence, the longest domestic ban ever handed to a player, and how Manchester United manager Alex Ferguson handled “the most controversial moment in Premier League history.”

He was included amongst the most influential Twitter users in UK association football. His tweets being used by outlets such as JOE and Sports Illustrated. In November 2023, he was nominated in the Writer of the Year category at the Football Supporters' Association awards.

== Personal life ==
He was educated at Nottingham High School and the University of Manchester, and is a supporter of Nottingham Forest.
