= Iain Macintosh =

British journalist, author and podcaster

Iain Macintosh is a British journalist, author and podcaster.

He has worked for ESPN, and has been the editor at The Set Pieces and written for The Guardian. He has also had articles in The Blizzard and Sports Illustrated, The Anfield Wrap, and has appeared on the BBC television programme Premier League World.

He has written numerous articles and books about the computer game Football Manager. He also authored a series of sports book entitled ‘Everything you would like to know about..’ with topics including football, golf, and cricket.

Macintosh was a co-founder of Muddy Knees production which produces The Totally Football Show, an off-shoot of The Guardian's Football Weekly podcast which he, James Richardson, and producer Ben Green left in order to create their own product ahead of the 2017-18 season. The new shows attracted five million downloads in their first two months and claim over 500,000 a week. As well as the flagship Totally Football Show, the Totally Football League Show was presented by Macintosh as a weekly podcast co-produced by AudioBoom - who reportedly saw their profits increase by 329% at the start of the 2017 season. Macintosh also appeared at Totally Football Live shows held at venues such as the O2, in London and Birmingham's Glee club. In 2020 Muddy Knees Media became part of The Athletic.

== Personal life ==
He is a supporter of Southend United. When asked by FourFourTwo, MacIntosh chose as his favourite football book "The Glory Game" by Hunter Davies (1972).
