= Jules Breach =

British television presenter

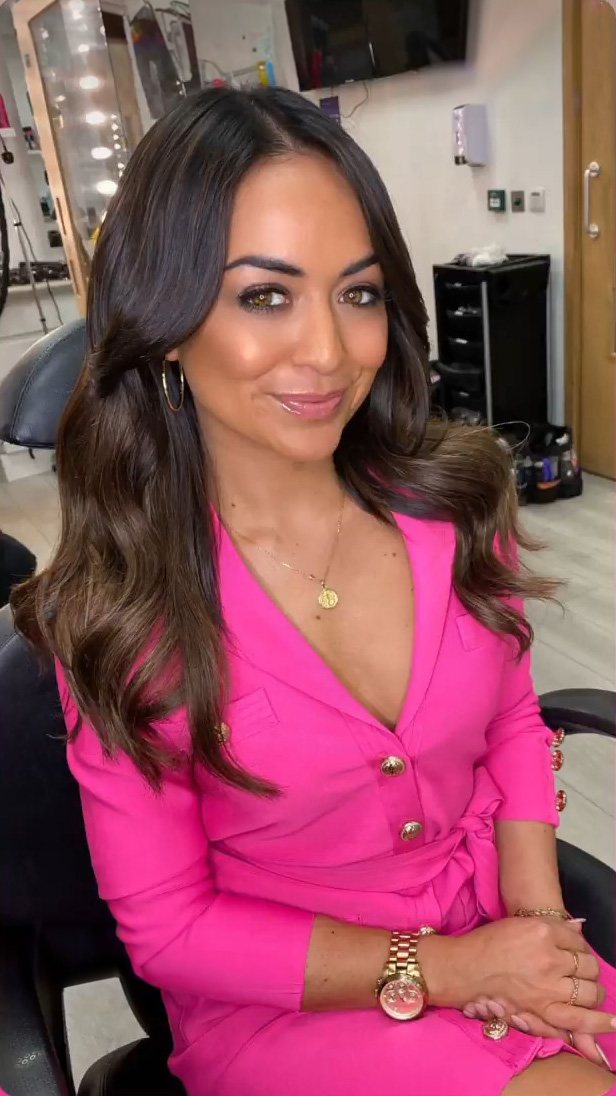
- Breach in 2023
- Born: Julie-Anne Sowa; 7 November 1986 (age 39); Brighton, England
- Education: Sussex University
- Occupation: Television presenter
- Spouse: Chris Breach (divorced)

Jules Breach (née Sowa) (born 7 November 1986) is a British sports broadcaster for TNT Sports, Fox Sports, Viaplay, and Channel 4.

== Early life ==
Breach was born in Brighton, East Sussex, her mixed heritage comes from Filipino maternal family and mixed English and Polish paternal family. When she was six months old, her family moved to Mauritius until she was 5 at which point she returned to England and attended St Mary's RC Primary School in Portslade, Sussex until moving again, this time to Jamaica where she lived from the ages of 8 to 15. In Jamaica, her passion was tennis. During her childhood, she also played in various tennis tournaments around the world.

Breach returned to Sussex to complete her education at Cardinal Newman School and then Sussex University, where she studied for a degree in Media before studying for an NCTJ qualification at Brighton Journalist Works. She also participated in the national council of the Training of Journalists. She is a fan of Brighton and Hove Albion F.C.

== Career ==
In her earlier media and broadcasting career Breach held presenting roles at Brighton's Juice FM, Latest TV and Sky Poker. Breach has presented live television in the UK on BT Sport, and Channel 4 as well as CBS Sports' UEFA Champions League coverage. Her live broadcasts have included the Premier League and live England national football team matches in the UEFA Nations League, and live rolling coverage covering all the Saturday 3pm professional football matches across Britain on the flagship BT Sport show BT Sport Score. She has also broadcast on ESPN, Putland TV and Radio, and UEFA. In 2015, Breach hosted the Rugby World Cup for BT Sport Score.

In her career, Breach was the Master of Ceremony of The Champions Club in the Emirates and Old Trafford Stadiums for both Arsenal and Manchester United.

Breach had worked for the women's cricket coverage for TNT Sports. In January 2022, Breach led the presentation team for the Women's Ashes series.

From 2022, Breach also presents the Saturday evening highlights package show of the English Football League on ITV, and has presented for the Premier League Productions English language team, and Australia’s Optus Sport.

Breach has also fronted coverage of the Women's Ashes live cricket on BT Sport in 2022. Breach has hosted The Football Ramble alongside Pete Donaldson, Andy Brassell, and Kate Mason, amongst others. Breach was also a guest on A Question of Sport, and presented the Premier League's Fantasy Football Show alongside James Richardson.

In 2023, Breach was the lead presenter for England matches on Channel 4.

She became a lead host for UEFA Euro 2024 and UEFA Women's Euro 2025 on Fox Sports broadcasting for American TV viewers.

Breach returned to Fox to anchor the network's 2026 FIFA World Cup coverage.

== Personal life ==
She was previously married to non-league footballer Chris Breach.
