= PressPass =

Soccer panel discussion show

- Directed by: Steve Palese
- Starring: Andrew Orsatti; Adrian Healey; Dan Thomas; Robbie Mustoe; Gabriele Marcotti; Tommy Smyth; Janusz Michallik; Shaka Hislop; Robbie Earle; Steve Nicol; Stewart Robson; Craig Burley; Sid Lowe; Julien Laurens; Raphael Honigstein; Martin Ainstein; Steve McManaman; Frank Leboeuf; Martin Keown
- Country of origin: United States

Production
- Running time: 1 hour

Original release
- Network: ESPN2 (2005-2013)

Related
- ESPN FC

PressPass was a 60-minute show which airs six times a week, Sunday to Friday, and features robust soccer discussion between presenters Andrew Orsatti, Adrian Healey, Dan Thomas and analysts including Robbie Mustoe, Gabriele Marcotti, Tommy Smyth, Janusz Michallik, Shaka Hislop, Robbie Earle, Steve Nicol, Stewart Robson, Craig Burley, Sid Lowe, Julien Laurens, Raphael Honigstein, Martin Ainstein, Steve McManaman, Frank Leboeuf and Martin Keown.

== Broadcasts ==
The show aired in Australia, New Zealand, the Caribbean, United Kingdom, Ireland, Africa, Israel, the Middle East and the United States.

== Format ==
Andrew Orsatti, Adrian Healey and Dan Thomas alternated as the main hosts. A personality-driven show, it often featured outlandish comments involving Smyth, an Irishman fond of using the term "Auld Onion Bag" when referring to goals scored. The hosts' job was to stimulate debate on a variety of global topics.

During the European club season, ESPN FC Press Pass paid particular attention to the Premier League, La Liga, Serie A and the Bundesliga.

Orsatti, Healey, Mustoe, Smyth, Thomas, Hislop and Michallik often commentated on soccer matches shown on ESPN.

Former presenters of the program include Derek Rae, Dave Roberts and Alison Bender.

== Guest analysts ==
Former Liverpool and Scotland player Steve Nicol became a regular contributor after leaving his post as Head Coach of MLS club New England Revolution. 1998 World Cup Winner Frank Leboeuf who collected multiple trophies in his time at Chelsea, including two FA Cups and a UEFA Cup Winners' Cup, appeared on an infrequent basis from ESPN's studios in Los Angeles.
