= Andy Brassell =

English writer and broadcaster

Andy Brassell is an English writer and broadcaster.

Brassell specialises in European football, and works as a pundit across many forms of media, such as Talksport, the BBC, BT Sport and ESPN, as well as newspapers such as The Guardian, The Independent, The Daily Mirror and the Daily Star. He has also written for magazines such as The Blizzard, FourFourTwo. He has contributed to the website for Premier League club Tottenham Hotspur, and Arsenal fan TV.

On the BBC, Brassell regularly contributes to BBC Radio 5 Live's Monday Night Club, and the European football show. He was previously a regular on Up All Night's World Football Phone-In .

On talkSPORT, he regularly features alongside Danny Kelly on Trans Europe Express, a show on every Sunday night from 9.00 pm which looks back at the weekend's European football action.

For The Football Ramble, Brassell contributes weekly to their On the Continent podcast, as well as regular Football Ramble Daily episodes.

As well as appearing on Football Weekly podcast, after the post-James Richardson split, he has also appeared on Richardson's subsequent venture The Totally Football Show.

== Personal life ==
Brassell is a fan of AFC Wimbledon. When asked by FourFourTwo, Brassell chose as his favourite football book Phil Ball's Morbo, a book about rivalry and the historical and societal contexts of Spanish football.
