= Duncan Alexander =

English podcaster

Duncan Alexander is a British association football statistician, broadcaster and author for The Athletic.

== Career ==
Under the pseudonym of 'OptaJoe', Alexander was the Chief Data Editor for football statistics company Opta. As 'OptaJoe' Alexander was a football commentator and pundit who live-tweeted during football matches with statistics and jokes. His first book, OptaJoe's Football Yearbook was published in 2016. His second book Outside the Box: A Statistical Journey through the History of Football was published in 2017.

Alexander has also written for the BBC, the Premier League, The Football Association, The Guardian, The Daily Mirror, and Sky Sports.

He is a regular contributor on The Totally Football Show, and has appeared on BBC Radio 5 Live, The Anfield Wrap and podcasts for The Times, The Independent, and The Daily Telegraph. He has been interviewed by FourFourTwo and Coca-Cola.

In January 2023 Alexander announced that he was joining subscription sports magazine The Athletic.

== Awards ==
OptaJoe was nominated for the 'online media of the year' award at the 2017 Football Supporters Federation Awards.

== Personal life ==
Alexander studied history at the University of Manchester. When interviewed by FourFourTwo Alexander chose as his favourite ever football book Among the Thugs by Bill Buford (1991). Alexander is a supporter of Wycombe Wanderers and lives in south London.
