= Raphael Honigstein =

German journalist and author (born 1973)

Raphael Honigstein (born 1973) is a German journalist and author.

== Early life ==
Honigstein was born in Bavaria to a Jewish family. In 1993, Honigstein moved from Munich to London. He studied law before becoming a journalist.

== Journalism career ==
In the 1990s, Honigstein wrote about pop culture for the German youth magazine jetzt.

Honigstein is the English football correspondent for the German newspaper Süddeutsche Zeitung, and has been the German football correspondent for the British newspaper The Guardian and the UK radio broadcaster, Talksport. In addition, he also contributes to Germany's popular football magazine, 11Freunde and the British football quarterly, The Blizzard.

Honigstein wrote for the UK arm of The Athletic until 2024.

== Broadcasting ==
Honigstein regularly appears on the podcast The Totally Football Show and, before its cancellation, on BT Sport television programme Sunday Night Football, both hosted by James Richardson, where he gives updates on German football. He has also worked as a German football expert for Sky Sports, alongside host Alan McInally, and on Setanta's coverage of the Bundesliga. He has also appeared on The Friday Football Show on Setanta, and on Setanta Sports News, discussing German football. He occasionally appears on the football show, ESPN Soccernet Press Pass.

He is a regular for the BBC on BBC Radio 5 Live’s Euro leagues show presented by Steve Crossman, with Guillem Balague, James Horncastle, and Julien Laurens.

== Publications ==
Honigstein's book on the peculiarities of English football, Harder, Better, Faster, Stronger. Die geheime Geschichte des englischen Fußballs, was published in German by Kiepenheuer & Witsch in 2006, and the English version Englischer Fussball: A German View of Our Beautiful Game was translated by Jamie Bulloch and published by Yellow Jersey Press in 2008.

Honigstein's book, Das Reboot: How German Football Reinvented Itself and Conquered the World, was published by Yellow Jersey Press in 2015 and charts the return of German football from the international wilderness of the late 1990s to victory at the 2014 FIFA World Cup in Brazil.

His latest book, Klopp: Bring the Noise was also published by Yellow Jersey Press in 2017 and tells the definitive story of Jurgen Klopp's career.
