= Jonathan Wilson (writer) =

English sports journalist and author (born 1976)

- Born: Jonathan Mark Wilson; 9 July 1976 (age 50); Sunderland, England
- Occupations: Author, journalist

Jonathan Mark Wilson (born 9 July 1976) is an English sports journalist and author who writes predominantly for The Guardian. He is a columnist for World Soccer and founder and editor of The Blizzard. In 2024 he started a football history podcast, It Was What it Was, with Rob Draper. He also appears on The Guardian's football podcast, Football Weekly.

== Biography ==
Wilson studied English at Oxford University and was the sports editor of the student paper, The Oxford Student. He read for a Master's degree at Durham University, where he was a member of the Graduate Society.

Wilson has written for The Independent, FourFourTwo magazine and The Sunday Telegraph and Sports Illustrated, and was football correspondent for the Financial Times from 2002 to 2006. He writes for The Guardian and UnHerd and is a columnist for World Soccer.

In 2011 he founded the quarterly football journal The Blizzard, which he edits.

Wilson was the main contributor to a feature on The Guardian website, "The Question", in which he analyses modern trends and evolutions in football. "The Question" has included articles on the decline of the box-to-box midfielder, the importance of the modern full-back and the evolution of the defensive striker. He is currently the main football columnist for The Observer.

His book, Inverting the Pyramid, was shortlisted for the William Hill Sports Book of the Year in 2008, and won 'Best Football Book' at the British Sports Book Awards in 2009. Nine of his other books have also been shortlisted for the award. Inverting the Pyramid also won the Premio Antonio Ghirelli and was shortlisted for the German football book of the year award.

His book, Angels with Dirty Faces, which covered the history of football in Argentina, won "Best Football Book" and "Best Historical Book" at the Polish Sports Book Awards (Sportowa Książka Roku) in 2018. The Names Heard Long Ago won "Best Foreign Football Book" at the awards in 2023.

He won FSA Football Writer of the Year in 2012, 2017, 2021 and 2024.

== Personal life ==
In 1985, Wilson went on holiday with his family to Lincoln. Wilson did not enjoy the holiday because he wanted to watch the Ashes, which were underway at the same time.

He supports Sunderland A.F.C. in football. He plays cricket on the Authors XI team with other British writers. He is also an occasional player for Hutton CC 5th XI, with whom his most memorable innings of an unbeaten 117 runs was achieved on July 9th 2022 against Belhus CC 5th XI. He appeared in series 10 of the quiz show Only Connect as part of the Nightwatchmen team. He resides in Wandsworth, South London.

== Books ==
External videos
- Q&A interview with Wilson on The Power and the Glory, 7 June 2026, C-SPAN

- Behind the Curtain: Travels in Eastern European Football (2006)
- Sunderland: A Club Transformed (2007)
- Inverting the Pyramid: The History of Football Tactics (2008)
- The Anatomy of England (2010)
- Brian Clough: Nobody Ever Says Thank You: The Biography (2011)
- The Outsider: A History of the Goalkeeper (2012)
- The Anatomy of Liverpool (2013)
- Angels With Dirty Faces: The Footballing History of Argentina (2016)
- The Anatomy of Manchester United: A History in Ten Matches (2017)
- The Barcelona Legacy: Guardiola, Mourinho and the Fight For Football's Soul (2018)
- The Names Heard Long Ago: How the Golden Age of Hungarian Football Shaped the Modern Game (2019)
- Two Brothers: The Life and Times of Bobby and Jackie Charlton (2022)
- The Power and the Glory: A New History of the World Cup (2025)
