= European Football Show =

- The show's logo, before the introduction of the Primeira Liga.
- Also known as: Sunday Night European Football
- Genre: Sports, Football
- Created by: BT Sport
- Presented by: James Richardson
- Country of origin: United Kingdom
- Original language: English

Production
- Production locations: BT Sport Studios, Queen Elizabeth Olympic Park, London
- Running time: 1 hour 15 minutes
- Production company: BT Sport

Original release
- Network: BT Sport 1

European Football Show (also referred to on occasion as Sunday Night European Football) was a football TV programme on BT Sport presented by James Richardson.

== Overview ==
The show was originally split into three segments. It began with a discussion between Richardson and the show's pundits of the weekend's European football (from the German Bundesliga, French Ligue 1, and Italian Serie A) along with highlights of matches played in the featured leagues. That led into the programme's featured live football match, which could have been from either the French or Italian leagues. Following the match, more discussion took place on the events of the match, and goings on from the world of football over the previous week.

However, more recently the show only lasts for one 1 hour and 15 minute segment of discussion from the weekend's news, with the live match becoming a separate programme afterwards. As well as a change in format, the Portuguese Primeira Liga was added to the show's focus leagues. An additional show, named European Football Show Extra, is broadcast on the following Monday, with Richardson and the pundits discussing various football topics show-by-show.

== Airings ==
The European Football Show is presented live every week from 18:30 to 19:30 or 19:45 (GMT) (dependent on the following game's kick-off time), mainly on BT Sport 1 but sometimes on other BT channels, it was previously shown on BT Sport Europe before the channel changed its name to BT Sport 3. When the show included a live match, it ran until 22:00. It is repeated throughout the following week. European Football Show Extra is shown on Monday nights, with repeats shown throughout the week.

== Features ==
The chat between the pundits is broken up by a number of different features related to the past week's football:

- Highlights - A round-up of the goals from one of the three featured leagues will be shown - this is repeated three times throughout the programme, once for each league, so that all goals are covered. Primeira Liga goals are also shown, but only those involving Benfica, Porto and Sporting CP.
- Around the World in 80 seconds - featuring highlights from other football leagues around the world, including goals, trophy wins and comedy events.
- Football Maths - Stats related to events of the past week are discussed (for example record consecutive wins if a team has won a lot of matches).
- Debater Generator - A random topic which has been in the news over the past week is chosen, which the pundits then discuss.
- Top 5 Goals - The programme is concluded with a compilation of the five best goals from the past week's football.
- Viewer Questions - Viewers are encouraged to send in questions and discussion topics via Twitter using the #btsnf hashtag, some of which are then brought up on the show.
- Euro Star - The pundits pick an up-and-coming young player from around Europe to showcase.
- Hartbeat - A feature following Joe Hart's career in Serie A with Torino during 2016–17.
- Phrase Book - A featured word from one of the league's spoken language related to football.
- Transfer Rumours - The pundits have 90 seconds to dissect as many transfer rumours as possible.

== Pundits ==
The programme is presented by James Richardson, along with regular pundits covering each of the featured leagues. These are Julien Laurens (Ligue 1), Raphael Honigstein (Bundesliga) and James Horncastle (Serie A). Other pundits and football personalities sometimes join the regular punditry team, these have included Steffen Freund, Dietmar Hamann, David Platt, David Ginola and Emmanuel Petit.

== See also ==
- Fox Football Fone-in
