= Neil Atkinson =

British journalist (born 1981)

Neil Atkinson (born 21 January 1981) is a Liverpool-based writer, broadcaster and film producer. He is the host, Content Manager, and one of the main writers and business developers behind online football and culture magazine The Anfield Wrap which has had more than 28 million podcast downloads worldwide. Atkinson has presented sell-out shows of The Anfield Wrap in London, New York, Toronto, Melbourne, Ireland and Scandinavia, as well as on stage at the Sound City Festival in Liverpool. Atkinson co-wrote and co-produced the film Native, which had a theatrical release in the UK in 2018 and won the feature film award at the 2016 Boston science fiction festival. Described as "smart" and "elegant" by Peter Bradshaw in The Guardian. Kim Newman in Empire magazine described it as "ambitious, unusual and thought-provoking". In The Times, Ed Potton wrote that it was a "script full of promise, with provocative things to say about empathy, obedience and individualism".

Atkinson was a regular Radio City Talk presenter and won the Football Supporters Federation 2016 national radio show award. He runs his own Liverpool-based production company, Film1st, and hosts music podcast The Rider. Atkinson has guested as a punter on The Totally Football Show discussing Liverpool Football Club's 2019–20 Premier League title triumph, and Liverpool's 5–0 win at Old Trafford over Manchester United on 24 October 2021.

Formerly a chairman for Spirit of Shankly, he has contributed to New Statesman discussing the social impact of tragedies and has appeared on BBC Breakfast, Football Focus, BBC Radio 5 Live, BT Sport and Sky Sports, during which former Manchester United defender Gary Neville described Atkinson as "a better pundit than me".

He co-wrote the 2014 book Make Us Dream with John Gibbons about the 2013–14 Liverpool F.C. season as well as Numero 6 in 2019, about Liverpool’s 2018–19 season culminating in their 2019 UEFA Champions League Final victory, their sixth European Cup triumph. In August 2019 with Michael MacCambridge Atkinson began Red Letters, a weekly correspondence about the Liverpool Football Club for the Liverpool Echo’s American website, which is being edited into a book. Atkinson has also written for newspapers such as newspapers such as The Guardian, The Independent the Liverpool Echo on Liverpool FC related topics.

In 2024, he authored the book Transformer: Klopp, the Revolution of a Club and Culture.

In 2026, Atkinson became host of The Breakfast Wrap a new format for The Anfield Wrap that included traffic announcements.
