= Kate Mason =

British sports broadcaster

Kate Virginia Lucy Mason
- Born: 22 November 1987 (age 38)
- Occupations: Journalist, television presenter

Kate Mason (born 22 November 1987) is a British sports journalist and broadcaster.

== Personal life ==
Mason grew up in the village of Oundle in North Northamptonshire and educated at Oundle School. Her mother was an English teacher and Mason read English Literature at Cambridge University. She decided to pursue a career in sports journalism after being inspired by female journalists such as Clare Balding at the 2012 Summer Olympics and Jacqui Oatley on Match of the Day. Her mother is a Wolverhampton Wanderers fan but like her father, Mason is a fan of Tottenham Hotspur.

== Career ==
Mason started sports reporting by reporting on Squash and was featured in The Daily Star and Metro newspapers. She joined a training scheme at the BBC in which her roles included working on BBC Radio London and BBC Radio 5 sports comedy panel show Fighting Talk, a show she would later appear on numerous times as a guest, and as presenter Colin Murray noted, the first member of staff to come back and win.

Mason worked for ITN, Talksport, and then for beIN Sports in Doha as one of the channel’s main presenters.

From 2019 to 2021 Mason was a presenter on Sky Sports News.

She joined The Football Ramble as a regular host in 2020 alongside Jules Breach, Andy Brassell and Vithushan Ehantharajah. As well as hosting regular shows Mason presents the Football Ramble Book Club and interview show The Drop In, for which Mason interviews a special guest, such as former England manager Glenn Hoddle. Her audio documentary "Inside the Qatar World Cup" for the Football Ramble won a bronze award at the British Sports Journalism Awards in March 2023.

In 2023, Mason took up the role of anchor on Eurosport’s coverage of the UCI Mountain Bike World Series alongside former Olympic Champion Bart Brentjens. She is also a regular commentator on BBC Final Score.

She has also appeared as a guest on The Guardian’s Football Weekly, and presented on Rangers TV, and guest presented the television highlights of the English Football league on Quest.

In 2024, Mason anchored TNT Sport's coverage of England's test series in India, alongside former England Internationals Sir Alastair Cook and Steven Finn. That year, she was part of the Discovery+ coverage of the 2024 Paris Olympics. Since March 2026, Mason has hosted the award-winning Tottenham Hotspur podcast 'The View From The Lane' after host Danny Kelly was diagnosed and subsequently passed away from cancer.

Appeared as Mate Kason as Sports Horns Inside Outside reporter.
