= BT Sport Score =

British television series

- Presented by: Jules Breach (2016–2023); Darrell Currie (2020–2023); Mark Pougatch (2016–2020)
- Theme music composer: Everything Everything
- Opening theme: "I Believe It Now"
- Country of origin: United Kingdom
- Original language: English

Production
- Running time: 135-150 minutes

Original release
- Network: BT Sport
- Release: 13 August 2016 – 28 May 2023

BT Sport Score is a weekly television programme which was broadcast between 2016 and 2023, on BT Sport, during the football season. The programme updated viewers on the progress of football games in the United Kingdom on Saturday afternoons, and aired between 2:45pm and just after 5pm.

BT Sport Score was hosted by Darrell Currie and Jules Breach. Pundits on the programme included Chris Sutton, Paul Ince, Robbie Savage, Jermaine Jenas, Peter Crouch, Karen Carney and John Hartson. During the show, updates were provided on action from the Premier League, EFL, Scottish Premiership and European football. There was also segments on news from social media and Fantasy Football updates. Mark Pougatch was the original presenter of the programme.

== History ==
For the 2016–17 season, BT Sport acquired rights to the Saturday evening Premier League matches, and BT Sport decided to launch a new Saturday afternoon schedule. As part of this new line-up, BT Sport decided to launch a football scores service. The programme was launched on 13 August 2016. Prior to the 2016–17 season, BT Sport had shown live rugby union coverage in this slot which was then broadcast on BT Sport 2.

The programme began on BT Sport 1 after the final whistle of the live lunchtime game had been shown. Most weeks, Mark Pougatch presented with Jules Breach providing EFL and social media updates. Occasionally, Breach presented alongside Jeff Brazier, on weeks where Mark was not present such as the Rugby World Cup. Darrell Currie took over as host for the 2020–21 season.

After 15 to 20 minutes of build up, the 3pm kickoffs were watched on monitors in the BT Sport studio by a variety of pundits each week. Occasionally, a pundit would cover a Bundesliga or La Liga match from the studio. Peter Walton, among others, provided referee analysis on the key decisions around the grounds. Elsewhere, there were usually around two reporters at Scottish Premiership matches, and at least one at a Vanarama National League match. During FA Cup weekends, BT sent out reporters to every game from the Third Round onwards and had pundits watching from the studio. FA Trophy matches were also occasionally covered by a reporter as well on select weekends.

In April 2023, BT Sport announced that the show would finish at the end of the 2022–23 football season. The reason given was that its demise was part of a review into non-live sports programming ahead of BT Sport becoming TNT Sports in July 2023.

== See also ==
- Final Score, a similar programme which is broadcast by the BBC
- Soccer Saturday, a similar programme, broadcast by Sky Sports
- The Goal Rush, a similar programme broadcast by ITV from 2001 to 2003
