= Sam Matterface =

English sports broadcaster

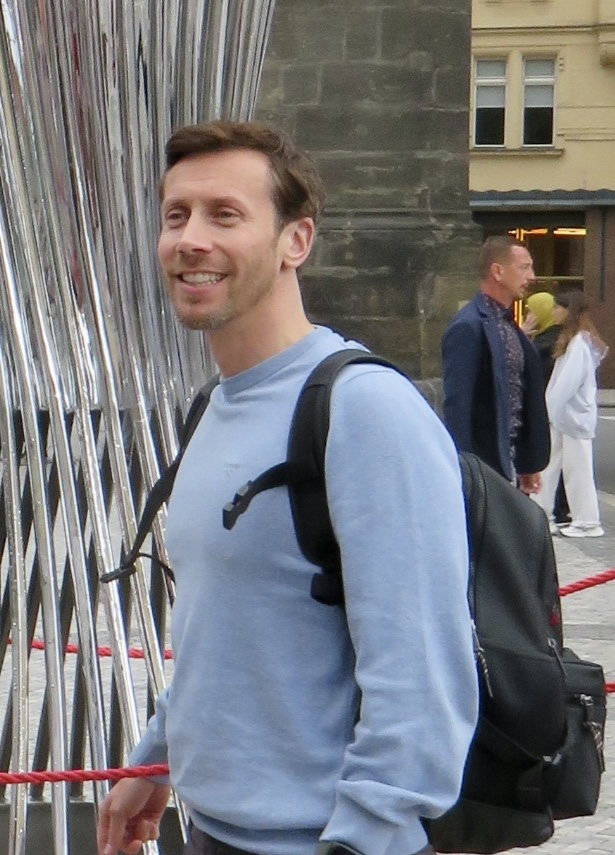
- Matterface in 2023
- Born: Sam Peter Matterface; 27 April 1978 (age 48); Dartford, England
- Education: Coopers School
- Occupations: Presenter, sports commentator
- Years active: 1992–present
- Spouses: Natalie Sawyer (–2014, divorced); Stef Matterface (m. 2018)
- Children: 1

Sam Peter Matterface (born 27 April 1978) is an English sports broadcaster currently working for Talksport, TNT Sports and ITV Sport. Matterface was also the commentator on the ITV skating competition Dancing on Ice from 2018 to 2024.

== Career ==
Matterface started working in sports radio in 1992 for local hospital radio station OHR, before moving into commercial radio at 16. He worked at BBC Radio Kent in 1998, then Capital Gold Sport from 1999. Matterface worked at the south-coast radio station 107.4 The Quay, where he presented the breakfast show and a variety of sports related programmes from 2001–2007.

Between 2006 and 2007, Matterface worked on the Sky channel Bravo, featuring in weekly segments on the football magazine show Football Italia. He presented short reels, entitled "What's a Matter You?", showcasing the more light-hearted moments of the Serie A gameweek, amidst the ongoing 2006 match-fixing scandal. The section was dropped in 2007 when the rights to Italian football were acquired by the free-to-air broadcaster Channel 5.

He started presenting on Sky Sports News in July 2007, before leaving in late 2010. On 12 January 2018, Matterface was confirmed as Matt Chapman's replacement as commentator for ITV's Dancing on Ice. Matterface did not return for the 2025 series and was replaced by Alex Crook, who previously deputised for him in later series due to his footballing commitments. On 14 July 2020, ITV announced that he would replace Clive Tyldesley as lead football and England commentator at the start of the 2020–21 season.

== Personal life ==
Matterface is a supporter of Chelsea. He was previously married to former Sky Sports colleague Natalie Sawyer, with whom he has a child.
