= Sliding tackle =

Skill in association football

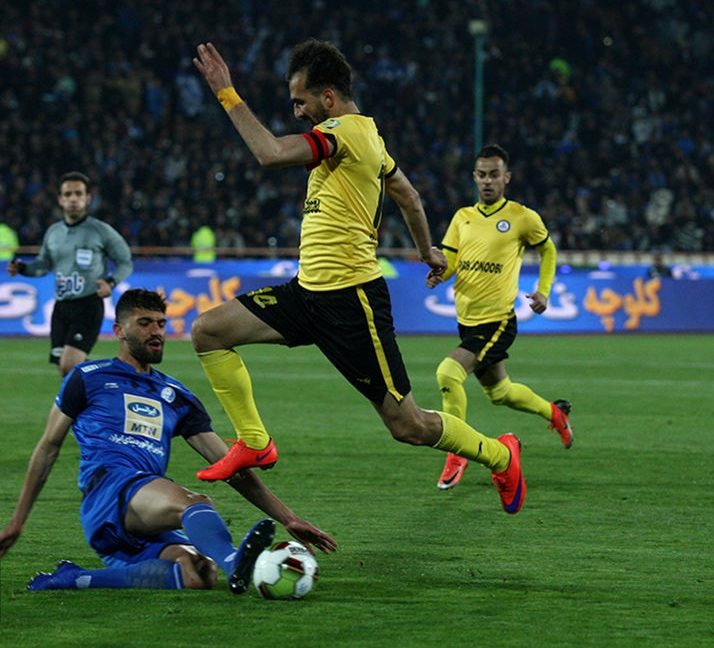
Sliding tackle performed by player in blue (Mohammad Daneshgar).

A sliding tackle, also called slide tackle, is a tackle in association football in which one leg extends to push the ball away from the opposing player. Sliding tackles can often be sources of controversy, particularly when players being tackled fall down over the tackler's foot (or the ball stopped by the tackler's foot), and penalties, free kicks and cards are assessed (or are conspicuous by their absence).

== Commonly associated fouls and misconduct ==
A sliding tackle is not in itself foul play; however, there are a number of fouls that commonly occur during the execution of a sliding tackle.

Examples of such fouls punishable by a direct free kick or penalty kick include:

- When a player behaves in a manner considered by the referee to be careless, reckless or using excessive force:
  - kicks or attempts to kick an opponent;
  - trips or attempts to trip an opponent;
  - jumps at an opponent;
  - charges an opponent;
  - tackles an opponent.

Careless means that the player has shown a lack of attention of consideration when making a challenge or that they acted without precaution. Reckless means that the player has acted with complete disregard to the danger to, or consequences for, their opponent. Using excessive force means that the player has far exceeded the necessary use of force and is in danger of injuring an opponent.

Careless challenges are punished by only a direct free kick or penalty kick. However, reckless challenges are also punished with a caution (yellow card) for unsporting behaviour as well as a direct free kick or penalty kick, while challenges committed with excessive force are also punished by a sending-off (red card) for serious foul play as well as a direct free kick or penalty kick.

Playing in a dangerous manner is punishable by an indirect free kick. Playing in a dangerous manner is defined as any action, that while trying to play the ball, threatens injury to someone (including the player themselves). It is committed with an opponent nearby and prevents the opponent from playing the ball for fear of injury. If any physical contact is made, the offence becomes an offence punishable with a direct free kick or penalty kick.

Slide tackles that are made as two-footed lunges at an opponent are generally considered to endanger the safety of an opponent and are hence sanctioned as serious foul play, resulting in a sending-off. This is still the case even if the ball is won cleanly without touching an opponent.

== Strategy ==
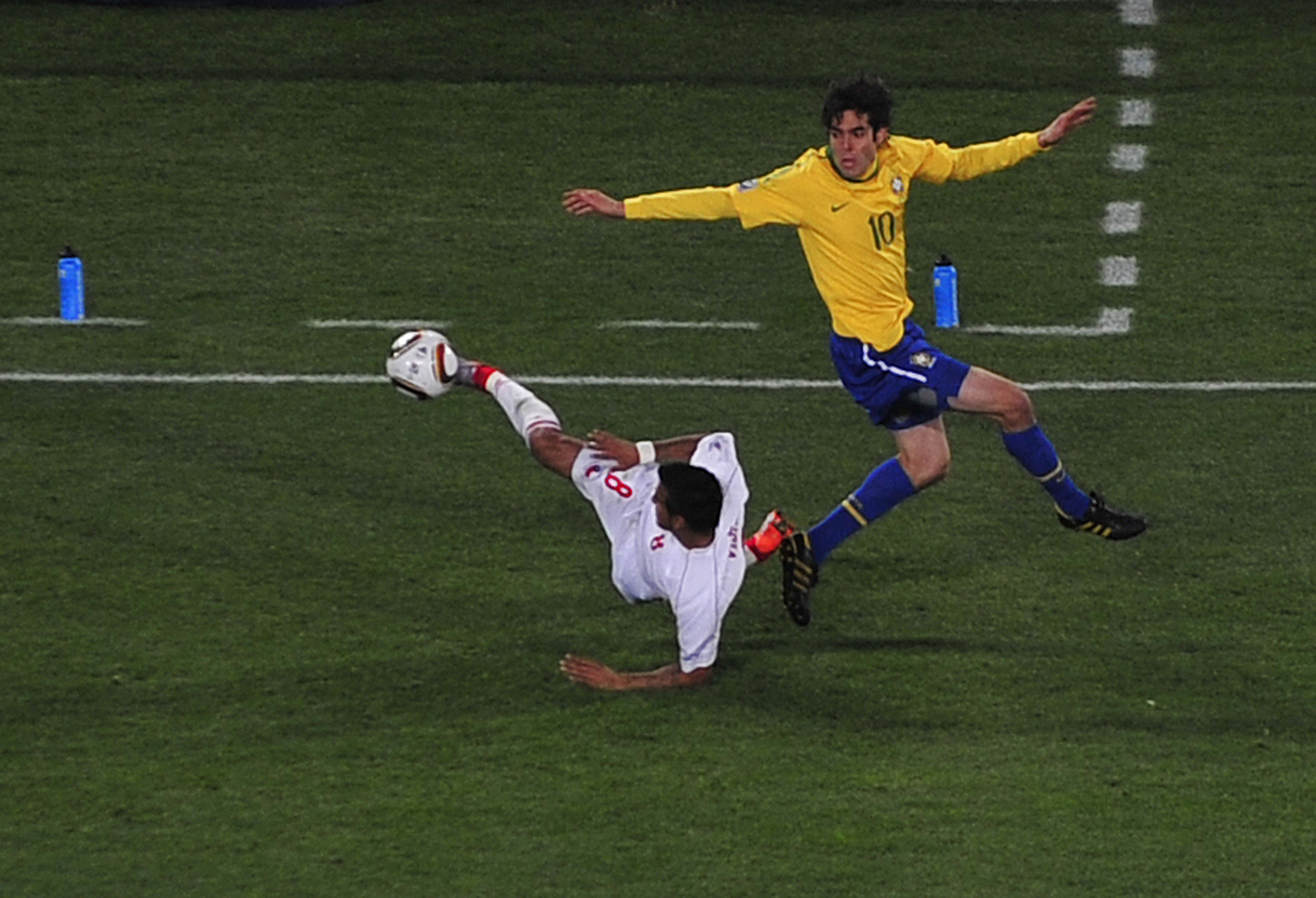
Arturo Vidal of Chile tackles Brazil's Kaká at the 2010 FIFA World Cup

The slide tackle is attractive to the defender because it allows them to cover a larger area of ground while attempting to dispossess an opponent. It is often a "last-ditch" attempt to dispossess an opponent due to frequent misses and the difficulty of recovering in the event that the slide tackle fails to take the ball away. After a slide tackle, the tackler is left sitting or lying on the ground with one leg extended. The tackler therefore also runs the risk of personal injury. Ideally, the other foot ends up folded underneath their rear end, where it can be used to push the tackler back up to their feet to continue play.

If doing a sliding tackle to the right, the player's right leg must be straight when going down into the tackle and their left leg should be bent slightly behind the right one in order to achieve maximum potential in gaining the ball. If doing a sliding tackle to the left, the player's left leg must be straight and their right leg should be bent behind the left one.

== Brexit tackle ==
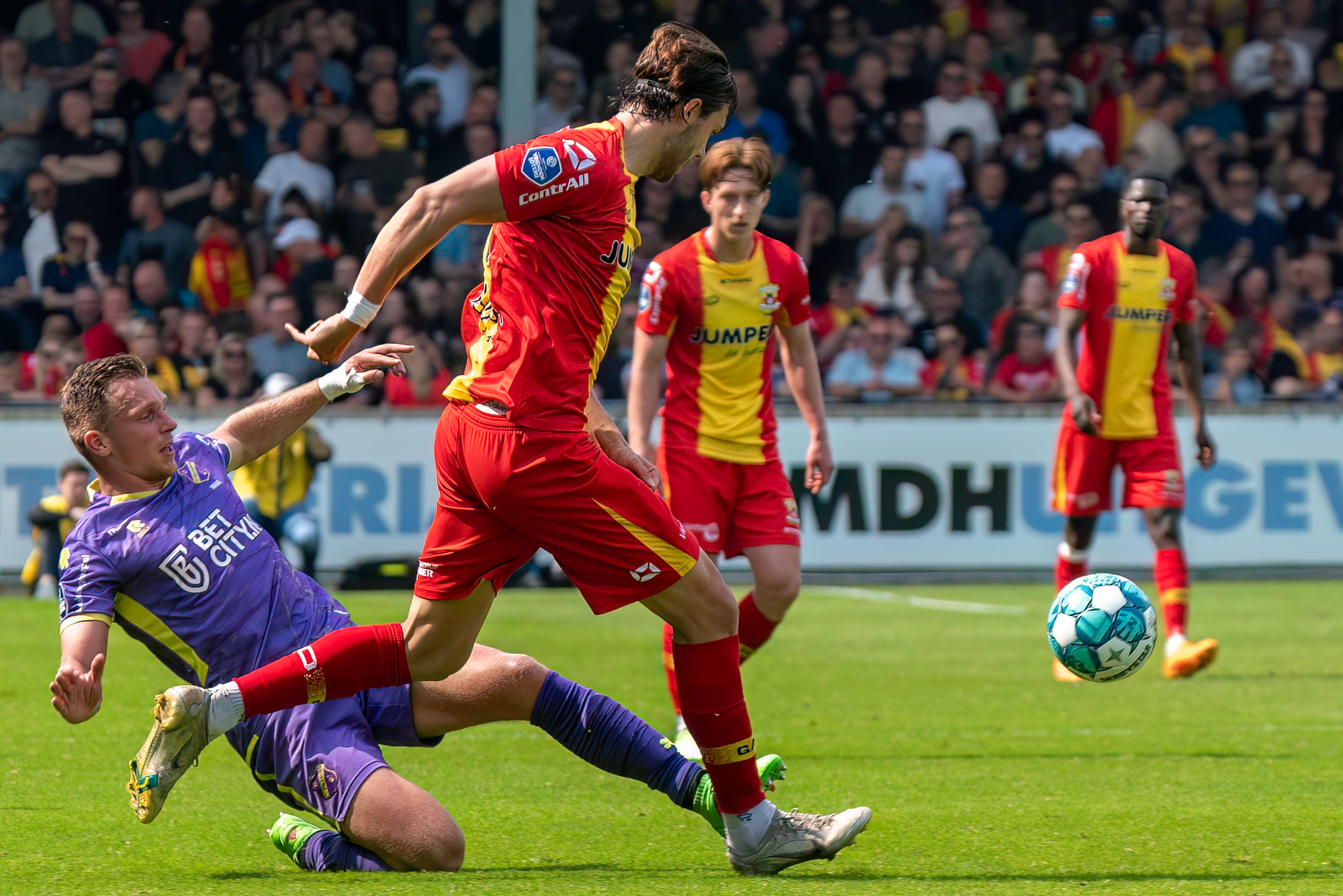
Brexit tackle performed by player in purple (Damon Mirani)

A Brexit tackle is a colloquial term (particularly common in the United Kingdom) for an intentionally aggressive and dangerous sliding tackle, typically made with little regard for whether the tackler wins the ball or for the consequences to either player. The move is sometimes preceded by the tackling player shouting "Brexit means Brexit".

By the early 2020s, variants including "Brexit tackle", "Brexit challenge" and the verb "to Brexit" became popular on youth football pitches and in football-related social media content. Football journalist Adam Hurrey has suggested that the expression began emerging around 2020 and partly reflects nostalgia for a more physical style traditionally associated with English football.
