= Kieran Maguire =

British academic, author, and broadcaster

Kieran Maguire is a British academic, author, and broadcaster. He specialises in the finances of association football and wrote the book The Price of Football. His expertise is frequently sought within English football media. Alongside comedian Kevin Day, Maguire presents a twice-weekly podcast called The Price of Football in which football finances are discussed.

== The Price of Football ==
Maguire is the author of the book The Price of Football, and presents a twice-weekly podcast alongside the comedian Kevin Day in which they discuss contemporary issues regarding, and listener questions concerning, the finances of modern day men and women’s football clubs. The podcast had a quarter of a million downloads within its first five months. This figure had doubled to 500,000 listens by May 2020.

=== Critical reactions ===
The reviewer for the Columbia University Press wrote: "At a time when many commentators are bemoaning the effects of “too much money” in the game, this clear-headed and rigorous analysis and presentation of the financial imperatives and challenges facing football will be welcomed not only by students of the industry, but by the wider constituency of fans and supporters."

Margaret Decker, writing in Blues Trust said "The Price of Football by Kieran Maguire is an excellent book for anyone who wants to understand how money impacts the game of football. You don't have to be an accountant to understand it."

Stephen Mumford writing in Times Higher Education said "This book should be essential reading for anyone even remotely considering investing in football (and, unless they are super-rich, they should probably stay away). For general readers, it won’t exactly enhance your enjoyment of football, but it should at least increase your understanding of what goes on and why."

Writing in Soccer & Society, Steve Menary says of the book: "In chapters 1-6, Maguire offers a simple but cogent explanation of a set of club accounts, then in the second half of the book looks to place annual accounts within the context of real financial issues ..." and "Manchester United's supporters will be better equipped to make a more informed decision ... after reading The Price of Football."

Writing in The Guardian about the podcast, Miranda Sawyer says: "Obviously, this one isn’t for anyone who actively dislikes football, but for even a casual fan (me), it’s a very interesting listen. Kevin Day .., teams up with financial expert Kieran Maguire ..." and "Day asks the right questions and Maguire is impressive with his research: in last week’s show he pointed out that a newspaper financial football story was completely wrong, without being rude about it. The machinations of sponsorship, TV rights, stand maintenance, even crowdfunding, are laid bare, and somehow this sheds light on to the actual games themselves."

In November 2019, the podcast was nominated for the 2019 Football Supporters' Federation Online Media of the Year Award alongside FourFourTwo, David Squires, and eventual winners The Athletic.

The Price of Football was shortlisted for the Fan Media of the Year at the 2020 Football Supporters' Association awards, and for their Online Media Award in 2021. In November 2023, The Price of Football was nominated in the Podcast of the Year category at the Football Supporters' Association awards.

== Academic career ==
Maguire has been involved in financial education since 1989. He is Senior Teacher in Accounting and Finance at the University of Liverpool Management School, where he teaches the Football Industries MBA. He specialises in financial reporting, financial modelling and football finance. Whilst at Manchester Metropolitan University in 2011, Maguire was awarded Best UK Accountancy Lecturer. He had also been named the 2010 Lecturer of the Year by students at the University. In addition, Maguire won the Innovation in Teaching and Learning Prize 2010 for his developments in student learning. Since 2025, Maguire has also served as a lecturer in the HELEGS Executive Program on the Law, Economics, and Geopolitics of Professional Sport, specializing in football finance.

== Studies and other media appearances ==
Other media appearances by Maguire as a financial football expert include audio platforms such as The Anfield Wrap, BBC Radio 5 Live, BBC Radio Sussex, Talksport and the BBC World Service. Print media includes national publications such as The Times, The Daily Telegraph The Guardian, The Independent, and specialist media such as the BBC Sport website, FourFourTwo, The Athletic, and Goal, as well as local newspapers such as The Liverpool Echo, Stoke based The Sentinel, Newcastle's Evening Chronicle, and the Hull Daily Mail.

The Express and Star quoted him extensively on the effect of the coronavirus pandemic on the finances of football clubs.

Maguire's expertise within football finance has led to him earning nicknames such as "Columbo of football finance", and the "rain man of football finance".

Kieran also contributes to football website Football CFB.

== Personal life ==
Maguire was born in the Elephant and Castle in London on 1st March 1962 to Irish parents. He attended Brighton Hove & Sussex Sixth Form College before graduating in economics at the University of Manchester. Maguire is a fan of the bands The Chameleons, The Jam, and Joy Division and football club Brighton & Hove Albion, where he holds a season ticket.

== Bibliography ==
- The Price of Football (ISBN 978-1911116899)
- Unfit and Improper Persons (https://www.bloomsbury.com/uk/unfit-and-improper-persons-9781399407540/)
