= Ben Green (producer) =

British media and podcast producer

Ben Green is a British media and podcast producer and currently the director of audio development (UK) for The Athletic. Green is commonly referred to as ‘Producer Ben’ on air.

Formerly a producer at Channel 4 News and LBC Radio, Green spent 11 years as a multimedia producer at The Guardian. Having joined The Guardian in 2006 he produced their Football Weekly podcast from 2008 until 2017, and also produced over 25 Football Weekly live shows, including a show for over 2000 people at the London Palladium.

He has hosted workshops on how to effectively produce podcasts at events held in London and in Dublin. He also produced an e-book in 2015 called Podcast Master: Your Short Guide to Broadcasting Online which was also serialised in podcast form.

He was the producer of The Totally Football Show an off-shoot of The Guardian’s Football Weekly from which he, host James Richardson, and regular contributor Iain Macintosh departed in controversial circumstances in order to co-found Muddy Knees Media to create their own product ahead of the start of the 2017-18 football season. The new shows attracted five million downloads in their first two months. As well as the flagship Totally Football Show, The Totally Football League Show and Golazzo: The Totally Italian Football Show are also weekly football podcasts released co-produced by AudioBoom who reportedly saw their profits increase by 329% with Muddy Knees Media claiming over 500,000 weekly listeners.

Green was co-host of the Parts Unknown, a podcast about professional wrestling.

He has also produced Totally Football Show live events held at venues such as the O2 in London.

== Personal life ==
Green has Jewish and Irish heritage and is a supporter of Liverpool F.C.
