= Julien Laurens =

French football journalist

Julien Laurens (born 4 October 1980) is a French football journalist and broadcaster based in London.

== Career ==
Laurens works for the French newspaper Le Parisien, and has featured regularly on BT Sport Talksport and ESPN as well as contributing regularly to The Times and their podcast The Game, The Guardian and the Daily Star.

He has regularly contributed to The Totally Football Show podcast and live shows with James Richardson, and has been a pundit on The Anfield Wrap. He is also a regular for the BBC and on BBC Radio 5 Live’s Euro leagues show with Mina Rzouki, James Horncastle, and Raphael Honigstein.

He is also a regular contributor to the ESPN+ soccer show ESPN FC. Laurens promised to shave his head on television if Arsenal lost a Champions League tie against Ludogorets, which they did not.

Laurens is the cohost of the Gab and Juls Podcast from ESPN with fellow football commentator Gabriele Marcotti.

He was included amongst the most influential Twitter users in the UK in football.

== Personal life ==
Laurens is a supporter of Paris Saint-Germain and Arsenal.
