= Laura Esposto =

Italian TV personality and model (born 1978)

- Born: Laura Esposto; 8 August 1978 (age 47)
- Website: http://www.lauraesposto.com/

Laura Esposto (born 8 August 1978, Bologna, Italy) is a television presenter and model.

== Broadcasting career ==
In 2007 she began presenting Five's Football Italiano in the United Kingdom, and has worked on Sky Sport in Italy since September 2009.

== Other activities ==
On 28 May 2010 Esposto presented The "Italian Candidacy" for UEFA Euro 2016 in Geneva.
