= The Game (podcast) =

Football podcast

- Genre: news commentary podcast, sports podcast, american football podcast, association football podcast

Publication
- No. of episodes: 1,129

Reception
- Ratings: 3.7/5

Related
- Website: https://www.thetimes.co.uk/podcasts/the-game

The Game is a free to download association football podcast produced by The Times newspaper and co-hosted by Tom Clarke and Gregor Robertson.

Launched in September 2006 following a pitch by Gabriele Marcotti and Guillem Balagué, and formerly hosted by Balague, Danny Kelly and Phill Jupitus, the podcast has been described by Barry Glendenning as featuring "some of the most knowledgeable voices in British football journalism". Episodes were released weekly during the football season but production increased with the introduction of Natalie Sawyer and became daily during the 2018 FIFA World Cup, and twice weekly from August 2018 to coincide with the start of the 2018-19 football season, becoming available on Mondays and Thursdays. Regular guests include Alyson Rudd, Tony Cascarino, James Scowcroft, Julien Laurens, Jonathan Northcroft, and Henry Winter. Marcotti announced he was leaving The Times at the end of the 2018-19 season.

The Game was nominated for Podcast of the Year at the 2016 Football Supporters Federation Awards.
