= Kevin Day =

British comedian

Kevin Hunter Day (born 3 May 1961) is a British stand up comedian, comedy writer and sports presenter. He came to prominence in the British alternative comedy stand up scene of the late eighties and early nineties, playing clubs like The Comedy Store. This led to him hosting the comedy discussion programme Loose Talk on BBC Radio 1 from 1992 to 1994, having initially co-hosted with Mark Thomas when the programme was launched in 1991.

He has co-hosted the Channel 5 sports programme Live and Dangerous with Mark Webster.

He has written for Dave Allen, Jo Brand and The 11 O'Clock Show.

In 2005 Day became, and is still, a programme associate for Have I Got News for You and contributes to the writing on the programme delivered by the guest hosts each week. He had previously been a guest on the show in 1991.

In 2005 he played Gary Mills in the TV comedy Broken News. Since 2004 he has been a regular on Match of the Day 2. He was an occasional guest presenter on the BBC7 discussion show Serious About Comedy. He was also a regular on Gabby Logan's Sunday morning radio programme on BBC Radio 5 Live. Aside from this, as a Crystal Palace fan, he regularly appears on the fan-made podcast, "Five Year Plan Fanzine". Since 2019 Day presents a podcast called The Price of Football with academic and football finances expert Kieran Maguire.

In the 1970s he was briefly a member of the National Front, a racist political party. He says it took the death of his black friend Richard Campbell in police custody in 1980 to "make the scales quickly fall from my eyes." He then became a left-wing activist, using his previous experience in his 1993 Edinburgh Fringe show I Was A Teenage Racist. Born in London, Day is a supporter of Crystal Palace football team and even held his wedding reception at the banqueting suite of the club's Selhurst Park stadium. He aided the campaign of the supporters' trust when the club was in administration and close to extinction in the late 1990s.
