= Mark Pougatch =

British broadcaster and journalist

- Born: Mark Charles Adam Pougatch; 27 January 1968 (age 58); Paddington, London, England
- Occupations: Broadcaster and writer
- Years active: 1991–present
- Employer(s): Stan Sport; ITV Sport
- Television: Stan Sport (2021–); 5 Live Sport (1995–2020); Sports Report (2000–2016); IPL Cricket (2011–); BBC Sport (1998–2015); BBC Radio 5 Live (1994–2020); UEFA European Championship (2016–); European Qualifiers (2014–); ITV Sport (2015–); BT Sport Score (2016–2020); UEFA Champions League Highlights (2015–2018); UEFA Europa League Highlights (2015–2018)
- Spouse: Lady Victoria Scott (m. 2000)

Mark Charles Adam Pougatch (born 27 January 1968) is an English radio and television broadcaster, journalist, and author who is currently a sideline reporter for Stan Sport's European football and the Chief Sports Presenter for ITV Sport, fronting their major football and rugby coverage. Pougatch was the presenter of BT Sport Score.

== Early life ==
Born in Paddington, west London, Pougatch attended Malvern College, where he was captain of the First XI cricket team and graduated with a degree in politics at the University of Durham where he was a member of Hatfield College. He then undertook a postgraduate diploma in Broadcast Journalism at the London College of Communication.

== Broadcasting career ==
Pougatch initially worked for six months at the former BBC radio station for London, BBC GLR. He then became a regular football reporter in 1992 with BBC Essex.

In 1994, he joined BBC Radio 5 Live, selected to be the main presenter of 5 Live Sport on Sundays. In August 2000, he switched to the flagship Saturday edition of the show and continued to present this until August 2016 when he was replaced by Mark Chapman.

Pougatch has presented coverage of the IPL cricket and the African Cup of Nations for ITV.

In January 2015, Pougatch replaced Adrian Chiles as the main football presenter on ITV, fronting the channel's coverage of the UEFA Champions League, England Internationals and later Euro 2016. In February and March 2016, Pougatch co-presented ITV's coverage of the Six Nations Rugby Championship and continued in this role in 2017, 2018 and 2019, subsequently co-hosting ITV's coverage of the 2019 Rugby World Cup alongside (amongst others) Craig Doyle.

In March 2012, he won the Sports Journalists' Association award for Sports Broadcaster of the Year.

He started presenting the Saturday afternoon show BT Sport Score on BT Sport in 2016 but had left by the start of the 20–21 season.

Pougatch is part of Stan Sport's coverage of UEFA Champions League, Europa League, Conference League and Super Cup, reporting live from the stadium.

== Other activities ==
Pougatch joined the team of Football Superstars, a game which was due to be released in 2009 as an innovative MMORPG game integrating gameplay with footballers' lifestyles. He is the author of Three Lions Versus the World: England's World Cup Stories from the Men Who Were There. He is also a speaker, after dinner and at daytime events.

== Personal life ==
Pougatch is married to Lady Victoria Scott, the younger daughter of the 5th Earl of Eldon. They live in Oxfordshire with their three children. His grandfather was among the Jewish diaspora who escaped Ukraine amid the violence that followed the first Russian Revolution.
