= Michael Cox (journalist) =

English journalist and author

Michael Cox (born 1988) is a British journalist and author who provides football analysis for the UK branch of The Athletic. He created the website Zonal Marking about formations and tactics in association football.

== Writings ==
Under the moniker "Zonal Marking with Michael Cox", he has regularly contributed to The Guardian and ESPN. Cox has written about his coining of the term "inverted winger" in 2010, to describe football managers selecting right-footed wingers on the left, and vice-versa, which has since passed into football-tactics parlance.

For the duration of the 2018 FIFA World Cup, Cox wrote for The Independent newspaper.

Cox featured regularly on The Guardian Football Weekly Podcast and appears frequently as a pundit on The Totally Football Show.

He has written a book about the history of tactics in the Premier League called The Mixer. Cox created a podcast called The Mixer with Marcus Speller which coincided with the release of the book and over a few episodes charted the history of the Premier League position by position. Cox second book produced by HarperCollins is an examination of the evolution of modern European football and is entitled 'Zonal Marking: The making of modern European football'.

== Awards ==
At the 2015 football blogging awards he was nominated, alongside Gary Lineker and Piers Morgan, as 'best football influencer'. He was runner up for the 2013 world soccer talk 'best blogger' award. Zonal Marking won best website at the 2011 Football Supporters Federation Awards, and was nominated again in 2012. At the 2013 FSF awards, Zonal Marking was nominated for the best independent website.

== Personal life ==
His teams are Kingstonian FC and Arsenal FC. He studied at Bristol University and although his first love was cycling, Cox has commented that he was always committed to football journalism.
