= Jonathan Northcroft =

Scottish journalist

Jonathan Northcroft is a Scottish sports journalist and author. He is currently the Chief Football Writer for The Sunday Times.

== Education ==
Northcroft first attended Newtonhill Primary School, where he regularly turned class writing assignments into yet another opportunity to write on football. His earliest effort came at the age of six with his review of the 1978 FIFA World Cup, entitled 'The Caterpillar Who Went to Argentina'. For his Secondary schooling he went to Mackie Academy, Stonehaven, where he left as Dux in 1990. Northcroft graduated with an MA in English literature from the University of Edinburgh in 1993. He then completed a postgraduate diploma in journalism at the Scottish Centre for Journalism Studies.

== Career ==
Northcroft began his career as a trainee news reporter at The Herald in 1995 before he joined Scotland on Sunday. He also wrote for several other publications including The Independent before he was appointed Scottish Football Correspondent by The Sunday Times in 1998.

He was promoted to Northern Football Correspondent in 2001 and then Chief Football Correspondent for The Sunday Times in 2009. Since his appointment, he has authored several notable books, including Manchester United Opus, which he co-wrote with Hugh McIlvanney, Patrick Barclay and Jim White amongst others.

The book gained widespread notability after a copy signed by the Prime Minister and ruler of Dubai, Sheikh Mohammed bin Rashid al-Maktoum was sold at auction for $1.6m, which was a world record price for a sporting publication.

Northcroft then wrote Fearless: How Leicester City Shook the Premier League and What it Means For Sport after Leicester City's surprise Premier League victory in 2016, and Deadlines, and Darts with Dele after he lost a game of darts against England midfielder Dele Alli during the 2018 FIFA World Cup in Russia.

He regularly appears on broadcast networks as a pundit, including Sky Sports Sunday Supplement, BT Sport programme Football Writers on TV, BBC Radio 5 Live, RTÉ Radio 1 show Today with Seán O'Rourke, as well numerous appearances on The Times own The Game podcast.

On 10 October 2018 Northcroft was included in a list of the 238 most respected journalists working in Britain as published by the National Council for the Training of Journalists.

== Awards ==
Northcroft was the inaugural winner of the Jim Rodger Memorial Award for young sports writers in Scotland. During his career at The Sunday Times, he was shortlisted for Feature Writer of the Year at the British Sports Journalism Awards in 2006 and for Football Writer of the Year in 2016 and 2018. He was nominated for Best New Writer at the 2017 British Sports Book Awards, and nominated for Writer of the Year at the 2018 Football Supporters Federation Awards.

== Personal life ==
Since childhood Northcroft has been a supporter of Aberdeen FC. He followed the team while Alex Ferguson was manager. He grew up in a sporting household and was encouraged from an early age to take an active interest in football and cricket. As a footballer he became a valued regular midfielder for Stonehaven Juveniles and then Edinburgh University. In his professional life he has appeared many times for the Scottish Journalists' Eleven and was once 'Man of the Match' at Wembley when his team triumphed over their English counterparts. For his cricket he appeared for Aberdeen Colts and also for his father's team in Aberdeen, Balmoral CC. As an adult he was a regular for Sefton Sunday Elevens in Liverpool, where he acted as a consistent if underachieving, batsman, succeeding in getting into the forties many times but never managing to go any further. He was present to witness Botham's Headingley 'Miracle' in 1981. He now lives in Leicester, is married to Jan and is father to two daughters.
