= Gabriele Marcotti =

Italian journalist (born 1973)

- Born: 28 July 1973 (age 53); Milan, Italy
- Education: University of Pennsylvania; Columbia University
- Occupation: Sports journalist

Gabriele Marcotti (born 28 July 1973) is an Italian sports journalist, sports author, and radio-television presenter. Born in Italy and now based in London, he was raised in the United States (Chicago and New York), Poland, Germany, and Japan.

== Early life ==
Marcotti briefly attended the European School, Varese in Varese, Italy. He subsequently obtained a bachelor's degree from the University of Pennsylvania and master's degree in journalism from Columbia University, New York.

== Print journalism career ==
Due to his fluency in both English and Italian, Marcotti writes for and contributes to various publications in both languages. In the United States, he is known for his work in Sports Illustrated, The Wall Street Journal, and ESPN FC. He also writes for Champions Magazine, The Times in England, and the Sunday Herald in Scotland, having previously written for the Daily Mail and the Financial Times. On 3 June 2019, Marcotti announced that he was leaving The Times to write for espnfc.com. In Italy, he is a columnist for La Stampa and is the London correspondent of Il Corriere dello Sport.

== Broadcasting ==
After working for Talksport radio for six years, Marcotti switched to Radio 5 Live, co-presenting the Friday edition of 5 Live Sport alongside Mark Pougatch to preview the weekend's fixtures in the Premier League and beyond. When Colin Murray began hosting 5 Live Sport on Friday nights, Marcotti moved to the Sunday night 6-0-6 programme. He also appeared in a November edition of the All Out Attack Podcast with Harry De Cosemo.

Marcotti often appears on the sports betting television station, SportsXchange and is sometimes interviewed on Sky Sports News and BBC's Football Focus, particularly when big stories break on Italian football such as the 2006 Italian football scandal. He has also appeared as a pundit on ITV's UEFA Champions League highlights show, and is a regular guest on ESPN's ESPN FC broadcasts. In the acknowledgements of How Soccer Explains the World author Franklin Foer refers to Marcotti as "my learned soccer guru" and writes that he "...doesn't just know his football, he knows his politics, economics, and culture."

=== Podcasts ===
Marcotti took over the job as host of The Times' podcast The Game in August 2007, along with Guillem Balagué, replacing Danny Kelly. He had previously been a main contributor to the podcast for the 2006–07 season. The following season he remained a prominent contributor to the programme, although Phill Jupitus took over as the host. Midway through the 2009–10 season, Jupitus left the show to concentrate on other work and Marcotti was re-appointed to the role of host. He left his role as presenter on 3 June 2019.

Marcotti is now a regular guest on U.S.-based football show Beyond the Pitch where he gives regular updates on La Liga, English Premier League along with all the latest transfer news. He is a regular contributor to "Golazzo: The Totally Italian Football Show" for The Totally Football Show with James Richardson and James Horncastle. In addition to The Totally Football Show, Marcotti is a pundit on several ESPN FC podcasts. He co-host The Gab and Juls podcast with French journalist Julien Laurens, and is also a pundit on the Serie Awesome podcast with English commentator Mina Rzouki and The Guardian's Nicky Bandini.

== Books ==
Marcotti has written and co-authored a number of books: Paolo Di Canio's autobiography (1999), 2006's The Italian Job: A Journey to the Heart of Two Great Footballing Cultures (written in conjunction with Gianluca Vialli), Capello: Portrait of a Winner (2008), an unauthorized biography of former England manager Fabio Capello, and Hail, Claudio!: The Man, the Manager, the Miracle, a biography of Claudio Ranieri. The Italian Job was nominated for the William Hill Sports Book of the Year. Capello: Portrait of a Winner was nominated for the National Sporting Club's British Sports Book of the Year award in the Football category.

== Personal life ==
Marcotti is married and has two daughters.
