= Adam Hurrey =

British journalist and author

- Born: 1983 (age 42–43)
- Occupations: Journalist, author, and podcaster

Adam Hurrey (born 1983) is a London-based British journalist, author, and podcaster.

== Biography ==
Hurrey is the author of the book Football Clichés released in 2014. It was named book of the week in The Independent, and in The Daily Telegraph was described as the spiritual heir to fanzines and the gleeful radio shows of Danny Baker and Danny Kelly. An excerpt of the book appeared in The Guardian.

Hurrey created the "Football Clichés" blog in 2007 while working as a TV listings editor. He has since written for Eurosport, ESPN, The Daily Mirror, the BBC, The Daily Telegraph, and The Set Pieces.

Hurrey has appeared as a football pundit on The Totally Football Show. Hurrey has been interviewed about football clichés on BBC Radio 4, for TheJournal.ie in Ireland, and with the Total Soccer Show in America. When asked by FourFourTwo, Hurrey nominated He Always Puts It to the Right: A History Of The Penalty Kick by Clark Miller (1998) as his favourite ever football book.

On 31 October 2018, it was announced that Football Cliches was nominated in the online media of the year category at the 2018 Football Supporters Federation Awards.

In 2024, he authored the book Extra Time Beckons, Penalties Loom: How to Use (and Abuse) The Language of Football. In October 2024, it was long listed for the William Hill Sports Book of the Year.

== Football Cliches podcast ==
Football Cliches
- Language: English

Cast and voices
- Hosted by: Adam Hurrey

Production
- Production: David Walker

Publication
- Original release: 23 January 2020

Related
- Website: www.nytimes.com/athletic/podcast/164-football-cliches/

Following a move to The Athletic, Hurrey began presenting his own podcast series on Football Cliches in 2020 with guests such as Jack Pitt-Brooke, Zonal Marking's Michael Cox, Elis James, Kelly Cates, Keir Starmer, Jamie Carragher, Nick Miller, James Maw, Charlie Eccleshare and David Walker. Since the start of the 2021–22 Premier League season, the cast for the majority of episodes has been Hurrey, Eccleshare and Walker. Football Cliches was shortlisted for the Podcast of the Year at the Football Supporters' Association awards in 2020, 2021 and 2023. In 2022, Football Cliches was nominated in the Sports Podcast Awards ‘Best Sports Comedy’ category.
