= Tommy Smyth =

Irish soccer commentator (born 1946)

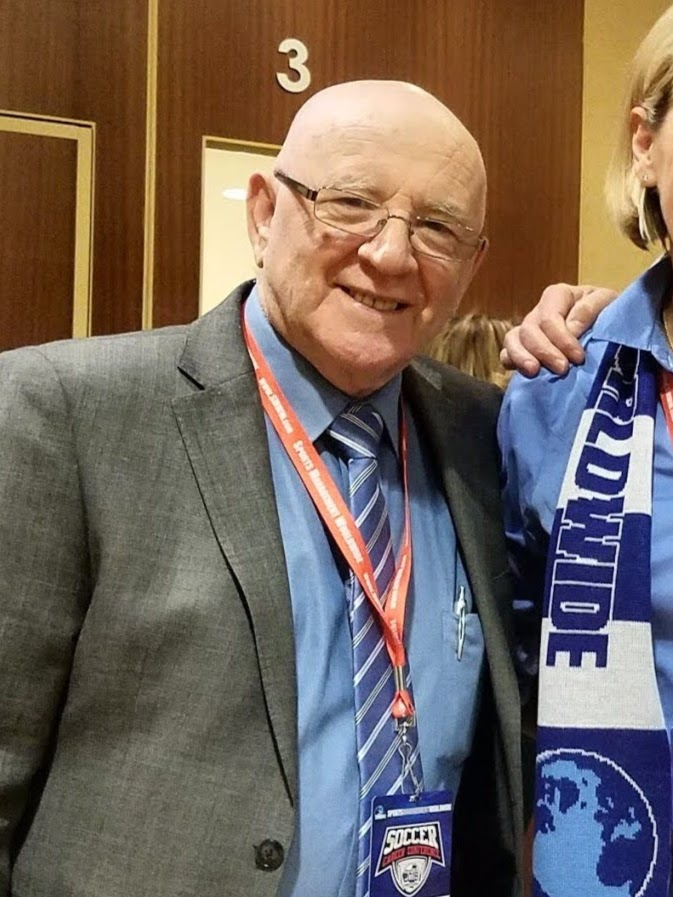
- Tommy Smyth in 2019
- Born: Thomas Michael Smyth; 19 December 1946 (age 78); Knockbridge, County Louth, Ireland
- Occupation: Sports Commentator

Thomas Michael Smyth (pronounced Smith) (born 19 December 1946) is an Irish soccer commentator. Since February 1993, he has been employed by ESPN in the United States, where his primary role is as color commentator and in-studio analyst for major soccer events. He also commentates on Gaelic games, horse racing, harness racing, and American football.

== Career ==
=== Player ===
Smyth moved to the United States in 1963 following a brief football career with a local Irish team. In America, he played with the Shamrock Club in the German American Soccer League as well as for the Boston Beacons of the North American Soccer League.

=== Commentator ===
Early in his career, Smyth was a commentator for Gaelic sports at Gaelic Park in The Bronx, New York, including Gaelic football and hurling matches for the local leagues from U-12 up to senior level. He, at least once, made a comical remark in regards to the poor level of play in a UEFA Champions League game, saying "I've seen better games played at Gaelic Park in Riverdale."

Smyth was the voice of the MetroStars of Major League Soccer from the team's inception in 1996 to the early 2000s, when his ESPN contract prohibited him from working for the MSG Network.

Smyth was the color commentator for the Philadelphia Union between 2017 and 2021 alongside JP Dellacamera. Previously, he regularly covered ESPN International matches weekly for La Liga, Serie A, the FA Cup, and International matches, and was one of the regular panelist on ESPNSoccernet PressPass which is hosted by Derek Rae. Rae and Smyth also commentated matches from the UEFA Champions League coverage on ESPN networks inside and outside the United States, forming the lead broadcast team on ESPN2, including the final on-location. The duo also paired up for their coverage of UEFA Euro 2008 for the early games and 2009 FIFA Confederations Cup before they returned to provide alternate British English coverage on the Amazon Video broadcast of Thursday Night Football in the US since 2017. He called three World Cups on television with ESPN, including 2006, where he partnered with Adrian Healey. In 2007, he joined ESPN's MLS broadcast team. He commentated on the UEFA Highlight show on Thursdays and Fridays. He would occasionally be a phone-in guest pundit mostly during the UEFA Champions League campaigns on the CSRN radio program, The 2 G's, sharing his opinion regarding the upcoming matches.

During ESPN's coverage of Euro 2008, Smyth shared commentary duties with Andy Gray and Robbie Mustoe, with Smyth calling the early game and Gray calling the late game. He was the lead color commentator for the 2010 FIFA World Cup on ESPN Radio, pairing up with JP Dellacamera, and he has become an outspoken proponent of instant replay.

=== Radio host ===
Smyth cohosts a show with Rodney Marsh called Grumpy Pundits on SiriusXM FC, Channel 157.

He is also a Soccer Management and Scouting instructor and an annual NWSL Draft Soccer Career Conference speaker for the online sports-career training school Sports Management Worldwide.

== St Patrick's Day Parade ==
Smyth was the 2008 Grand Marshal of the 247th St. Patrick's Day Parade in New York City. He has been the co-host for WNBC coverage of the New York City's St. Patrick's Day Parade since 1998.

== Style ==
Smyth is known for signing off when commentating as "Tommy Smyth... with a Y," and for his description of a ball flying into the net when a goal is scored as "a bulge in the old onion bag". He also is known for saying "a peach of a goal."
