= Natalie Sawyer =

TV & Radio presenter

- Born: Natalie Lorraine Sawyer; 23 October 1979 (age 47); Ealing, London, England

Natalie Lorraine Sawyer (born 23 October 1979) is an English television, radio and podcast presenter, currently working as a presenter for the Talksport radio station.

Sawyer parted company with Sky Sports News in March 2018, after 18 years of service having initially joined the production team. From the 2018 FIFA World Cup onwards Sawyer began presenting The Game for The Times.

== Personal life ==
Sawyer was born to an English father and a Bulgarian mother.

She was married to former Sky Sports News colleague Sam Matterface and they have a son named Sawyer, born on 28 October 2010.

Sawyer is a fan of Brentford F.C. In 2012 the club featured her in an advertising campaign that saw her image used on a bus in an effort to promote their ticket prices.
