= Michael MacCambridge =

American author (born 1963)

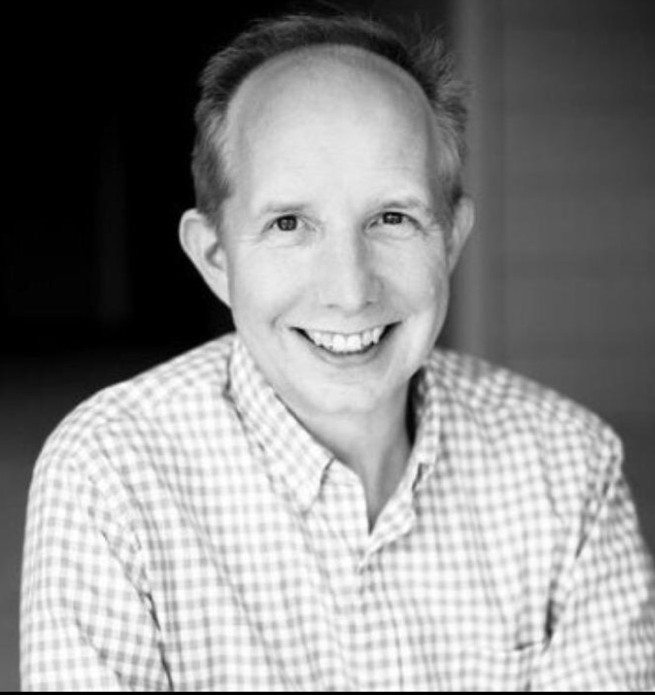
- Michael MacCambridge
- Born: June 21, 1963 (age 63); Houston, Texas
- Education: Creighton University; Northwestern University
- Occupations: Author editor

Michael MacCambridge (born June 21, 1963) is an American author, journalist and TV commentator. He is the author, co-author, or editor of 8 books, including the acclaimed America's Game: The Epic Story of How Pro Football Captured a Nation.

MacCambridge's most recent book is '69 Chiefs: A Team, a Season and the Birth of Modern Kansas City, chronicling the Kansas City Chiefs' 1969 Super Bowl championship season. It was released in October 2019 by Andrews McMeel Publishing.

== Early life ==
MacCambridge was born in Houston, Texas, but lived the majority of his youth in Kansas City, Missouri, moving there at age 8 after 3 years in Franklin, Nebraska and Omaha, Nebraska. He graduated from The Barstow School in 1981. He attended Marquette University for two years before transferring to Creighton University, where he graduated with a B.S. in journalism in 1985. The following year he earned a master's degree from the Medill School of Journalism at Northwestern University.

== Career ==
=== Writer/Author ===
MacCambridge began his career as a copy editor and staff writer at the Omaha World-Herald. He was hired by Daily Variety as a staff writer/reviewer in 1987. In 1988 he was hired by the Austin American-Statesman as a pop music critic; in 1990 he became the American-Statesman's film critic, a position he held until 1995. During his tenure at the American-Statesman, he founded the Society of Texas Film Critics.

He departed to launch a career as an author, which began upon the 1997 release of The Franchise: A History Of Sports Illustrated Magazine. The Franchise was named a New York Times Noteworthy Book that year. He then edited the New York Times bestseller ESPN SportsCentury, which accompanied the release of ESPN's Top 100 athletes of the 20th Century. The book featured an introduction by David Halberstam and original essays by Dick Schaap, Joyce Carol Oates, Tony Kornheiser, Nelson George and Roy Blount Jr., among others.

In 2004 Random House released MacCambridge's America's Game: The Epic Story of How Pro Football Captured a Nation. Jonathan Yardley listed the book as among 2004's most distinguished releases, and Chris Willis of NFL Films rated America's Game the "top pro football book of all-time."

MacCambridge served as editor of the 2005 ESPN College Football Encyclopedia, which Sports Illustrated described as "of truly Biblical proportions...Massive in scope and minute in detail, it's a worthy successor to its ancestor, The Baseball Encyclopedia."

In 2016 MacCambridge completed the biography Chuck Noll: His Life's Work, published by the University of Pittsburgh Press.

MacCambridge contributed an essay on the post-World War II rise of pro football to the 2009 release of A New Literary History of America by Greil Marcus and Werner Sollors. He has also contributed freelance columns and essays to The New York Times, The Wall Street Journal and Sports Illustrated, among other publications.

In August 2019 MacCambridge and Neil Atkinson began Red Letters, a weekly correspondence about the Liverpool Football Club for the Liverpool Echo's American website.

=== Other work ===
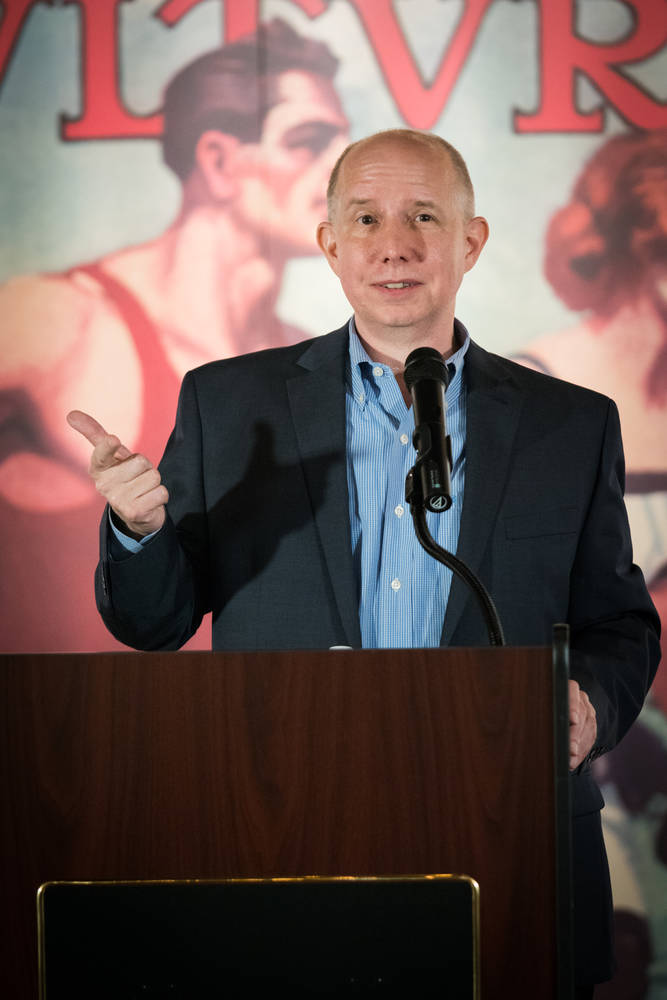
Michael MacCambridge speaking at the announcement of the Jenkins Medal for Excellence in Sportswriting – March 2017

MacCambridge co-chairs (along with Sally Jenkins) the awards jury for the Dan Jenkins Medal For Excellence in Sportswriting, sponsored by the University of Texas. He has also served as a Fellow at that university's Center for Sports Communication & Media in the Moody College of Communication since 2018.

== Personal life ==
MacCambridge was married to Danica Frost from 1995 to 2005; they have two children, Miles and Ella. He resides in Austin, Texas. He is a devoted fan of the Kansas City Chiefs, and was hired as the editorial coordinator of the Chiefs' Hall Of Honor, which opened in 2010.
