= Pete Donaldson =

English podcaster, radio presenter and Japanophile

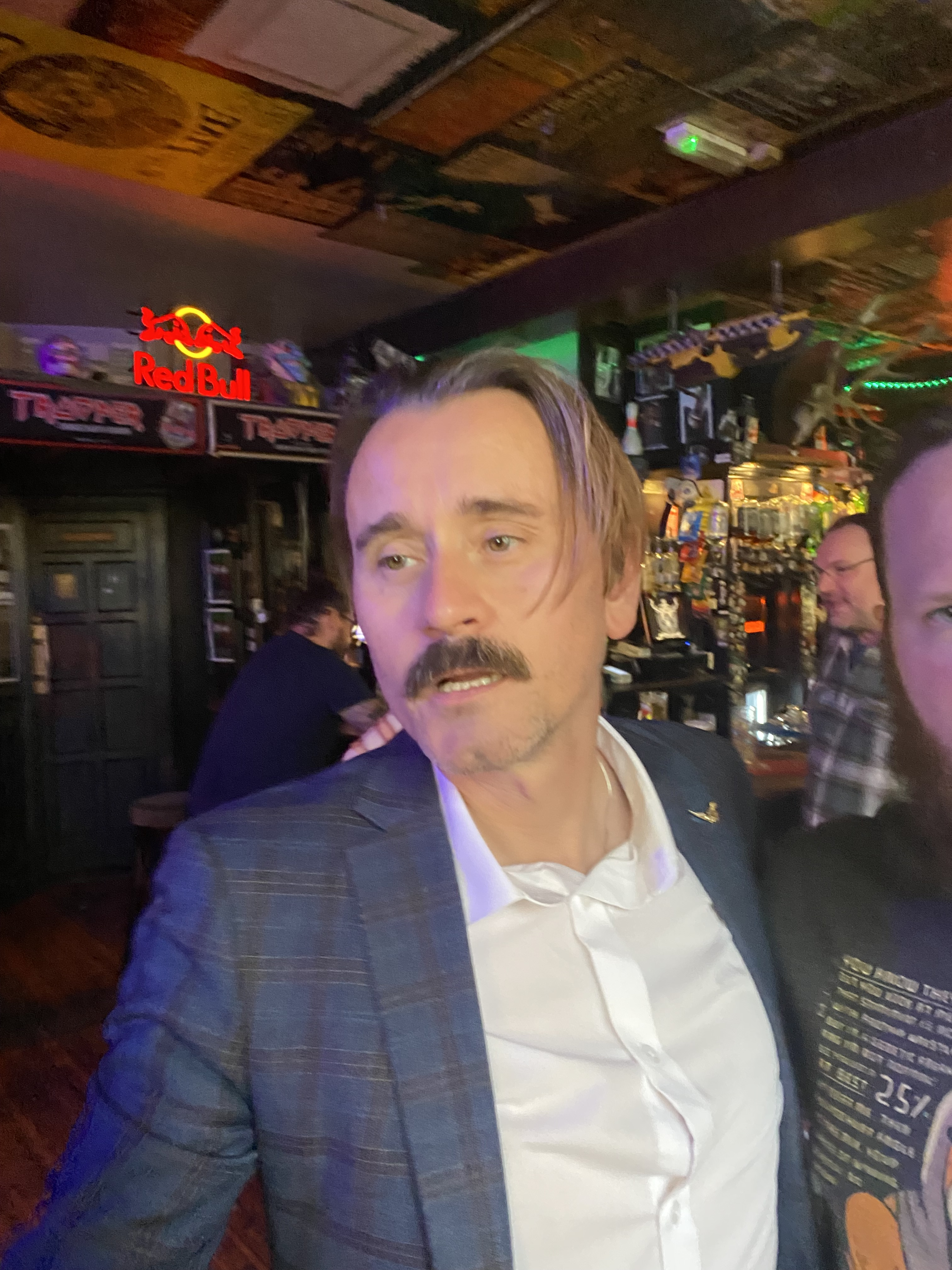
- Donaldson in 2024

Comedy career
- Years active: 2006–present
- Medium: Television, radio, podcasting

Pete Donaldson is an English podcaster and radio presenter. He featured on the Danny Wallace Saturday show on Xfm (since rebranded as Radio X) and the Alex Zane breakfast show and is currently one of the presenters on The Football Ramble, Wrestle Me and The Luke and Pete Show podcasts. Donaldson has cohosted the Abroad in Japan podcast with Chris Broad since 2018.

== Career ==
Donaldson moved to London in 2003 after studying Multimedia Media Design at University. After working as a graphic designer for three years, he gained work experience, and in turn full employment, on The Lauren Laverne Breakfast Show in 2006. He later worked as co-presenter of the Alex Zane Breakfast Show - also on Xfm. As a radio producer, Donaldson produced shows for the likes of Adam and Joe and Danny Wallace.

In 2009 Donaldson could be found presenting solo on Early Breakfast on Xfm. He also moved from being a producer on the Football Ramble podcast to a full-time host, something he continues today.

Donaldson later hosted the evening show of Absolute Radio, the Rock and Roll Football Matchday Warmup, as well as covering red carpet events and interviewing bands at sessions and festivals for the station. In March 2018, it was revealed that Donaldson would replace Dave Berry as the presenter of Absolute Radio's Hometime Show (due to Berry replacing Christian O'Connell as the presenter of Absolute Radio's Breakfast Show.)

On 12 December 2019, Donaldson announced he would be leaving Absolute Radio after nine years. In May 2026, Donaldson announced he would return to Absolute Radio, this time as the presenter of Absolute's new Knurr and Spell show.

He also voiced the character Jerry Brockhaus in the 2008 video game Zak McKracken: Between Time and Space and characters in The Journey Down Part 2.

== Podcasts ==
In August 2014, Donaldson founded podcast production company Stakhanov Industries alongside fellow Rambler Luke Moore, and Jonathan 'Lord Ramble' Teague. The company uses the commercial name "Stak".

In 2018, Donaldson created the podcast Abroad in Japan, with Chris Broad. The podcast focuses on life in Japan. According to them it's "probably the best way of learning about life in Japan without actually being in Japan", which Chris Broad mentions in the intro of the episodes.

Donaldson also co-hosts popular podcast 'WrestleMe' with Marc Haynes. The pair discuss every Wrestlemania event in chronological order, as well as occasional diversions into notable moments from the wider history of professional wrestling. The show's basic conceit contrasts Haynes' lifelong enthusiasm for wrestling against Donaldson's initial lack of knowledge on the sport. GQ magazine described the podcast as ‘Enrapturing…part-wrestling podcast, part-breakdown of the sheer ridiculousness of pro wrestling, and part-examination of the human condition’. A live version of the podcast first was hosted by Haynes and Donaldson in September 2018, and a Patreon page for the show was launched in March 2020. Subscribers receive shows which delve into historic WCW pay-per-views, as well as other notable moments from WWE history.

Donaldson is also a co-host in VGC: The Videogames Podcast, self-described as a "videogame podcast for grown-ups".
