= The Totally Football Show =

British football podcast

- Genre: Sport
- Format: Audio/Video
- Country of origin: United Kingdom
- Language: English

Cast and voices
- Hosted by: James Richardson

Production
- Production: Ben Green
- Length: 50–80 minutes

Publication
- No. of episodes: 1,160
- Original release: 2017
- Provider: The Athletic

Related
- Preceded by: Football Weekly
- Related shows: Golazzo: The Totally Italian Football Show (2017–21)

The Totally Football Show with James Richardson is a thrice weekly podcast about association football produced by The Athletic. It regularly features on lists of the best association football podcasts.

== History ==
The podcast was an off-shoot of The Guardian newspaper's Football Weekly podcast from which presenter Richardson, Producer Ben, and regular contributor Iain Macintosh left in order to create their own product ahead of the 2017–18 season. The new shows received five million downloads in their first two months. Throughout the 2017–18 season 26 million downloads were reported. For the 2018–19 season the 'Totally Football Show' will be sponsoring the football shirts of Melchester Rovers in the re-boot of the Roy of the Rovers graphic novels.

In June 2020, Muddy Knees Media and The Totally Football Show became part of The Athletic.

== Content ==
As well as the flagship Totally Football Show, the Totally Football League show and Golazo: the Totally Italian Football Show, the Totally Football League Show, and the Totally Scottish Football Show are also weekly podcasts co-produced by Audio Boom who reportedly saw their profits increase by 329% in 2017. The Totally Football Show: American Edition was launched in October 2018 hosted by US soccer record caps holder Cobi Jones. It ended after MLS Cup was handed out that season.

The Monday and Thursday editions of the show typically focus on news around the English Premier League. The Tuesday edition of the show, known as the "European edition," usually focuses on Serie A, La Liga, the German Bundesliga and Ligue 1, as well as the UEFA Champions League and any other European leagues making news the previous weekend, with Richardson regularly joined by contributors James Horncastle, Raphael Honigstein, Julien Laurens and Alvaro Romeo.

There are also Totally Football Live shows held at venues such as The O2 in London.

== Regular contributors ==
- Duncan Alexander
- Carl Anka
- Caroline Barker
- Kelly Cates
- Adrian Clarke
- Michael Cox
- Matt Davies-Adams
- Charlie Eccleshare
- Natalie Gedra
- Sasha Guryanov
- Jay Harris
- Raphael Honigstein
- Lynsey Hooper
- James Horncastle
- Richard Hughes
- Adam Hurrey
- Jack Lang
- Benji Lanyado
- Julien Laurens
- Flo Lloyd-Hughes
- Iain Macintosh
- Gabriele Marcotti
- Bassil Mikdadi
- Pat Nevin
- Sam Parkin
- David Preece
- Alvaro Romeo
- Tim Spiers
- Daniel Storey
- Liam Tharme
- Tom Williams
- Laurie Whitwell
- Colin Millar
- Sebastian Stafford-Bloor
- Pol Ballús

== Reception ==
They were nominated for ‘podcast of the year’ at the 2017 Football Supporters Federation Awards. On 31 October 2018, it was announced that The Totally Football Show has been nominated in the ‘podcast of the year’ category at the 2018 Football Supporters Federation Awards. On 10 April 2019 the show was nominated in the ‘Best Sport Podcast’ category at the British Podcast Awards which it subsequently won. The Totally Football Show was shortlisted for the Podcast of the Year at the Football Supporters' Association awards in 2021. In February 2023 the show was nominated in the Podcast category at the British Sports Journalism Awards. In April 2023, the podcast won best soccer podcast at the Sports Group Podcast Awards.
