= Guillem Balagué =

Spanish football journalist (born 1968)

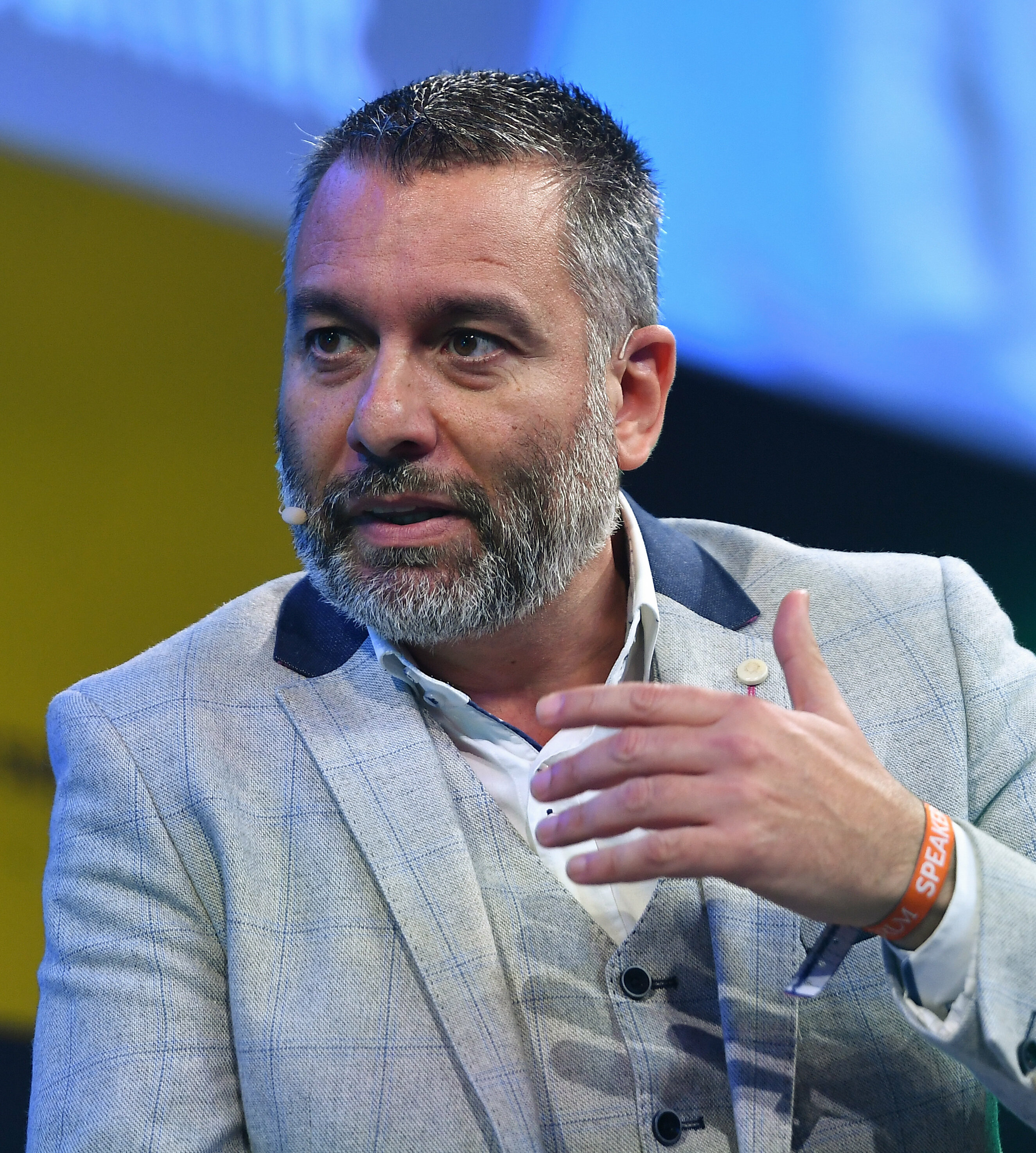
- Balagué in 2019
- Born: Guillem Ramón Antonio Balagué; 2 November 1968 (age 57); Barcelona, Spain
- Education: Autonomous University of Barcelona (BJ)
- Occupation: Football journalist • writer • author
- Years active: 1989–present
- Employer: BBC
- Awards: Cross Sports Book Awards; Football Book of the Year
- Website: guillembalague.com

Guillem Ramón Antonio Balagué (born 2 November 1968) is a Spanish football journalist, author, and pundit. He was a regular pundit on Sky Sports' show Revista de la Liga and has also written for some of Britain's newspapers as well as several Spanish newspapers.

== Journalism ==
In June 2008, Balagué launched his own personal website, featuring a blog, news and the opportunity to interact with him directly.

Balagué has made contributions to several English and Spanish newspapers. He is currently preparing a documentary and also the last Pep Guardiola biography in English. He has written articles in British newspapers The Times and The Observer, as well as a weekly column in the free daily The Metro making mainly on stories involving continental football. He also occasionally writes for sport website Bleacher Report.

He is also well known for his work with Spanish football newspaper Diario AS and Spain's national radio station Cadena SER, where he features on phone-ins regularly.

Balagué and Gabriele Marcotti presented The Game podcast, hosted by The Times, for the 2007–08 Premier League season.

Balagué appeared as a contestant on an episode of Pointless Celebrities teamed with former Argentina international footballer Ossie Ardiles, first broadcast on 29 April 2017.

His book, Cristiano Ronaldo. The Biography was named Football Book of the Year 2016 in Polish Sports Book Awards (Sportowa Książka Roku).

Since Sky Sports lost their rights to La Liga he has appeared many Thursdays on BBC Radio 5 Live's Football Daily, Europa Leagues podcast. He has also worked for CBS Sports in the US on their UEFA Champions League coverage and hosted the travelogue series Destination: European Nights for Paramount+.

== Involvement in football ==
In 2013, Balagué became a B licensed coach. In 2014, he became Director of Football at English non-league football team Biggleswade United, and is now the chairman of the club.

== Books ==
- A Season on the Brink: Rafael Benitez, Liverpool and the Path to European Glory: A Portrait of Rafa Benitez's Liverpool. Orion. 19 October 2006. ISBN 978-0-7528-7936-9.
- Pep Guardiola: Another Way of Winning: The Biography. Orion. 15 August 2013. ISBN 978-1-4091-2946-2.
- Messi. Orion (published 5 December 2013). 2013. ISBN 978-1-4091-4659-9.
- Barça. Carlton. 6 November 2014. ISBN 978-1-78097-369-2.
- Cristiano Ronaldo: The Biography. Orion (published 5 November 2015). 15 November 2016. ISBN 978-1-4091-5504-1.
- Brave New World: Inside Pochettino's Spurs. W&N (published 26 October 2017). 8 May 2018. ISBN 978-1-4091-5771-7.
- Rise of the Villans: Inside Unai Emery's Aston Villa Revolution. Guillem Balague's Books. 25 September 2025. ISBN 9781399625043.
