= The Football Ramble =

Sports podcast

- Genre: Sports; comedy
- Language: English

Cast and voices
- Hosted by: Marcus Speller; Jim Campbell; Luke Moore; Pete Donaldson; Vithushan Ehantharajah

Production
- Production: Stak

Publication
- Original release: 2007

Related
- Website: www.stak.london//

The Football Ramble is a podcast, about association football, produced in London by podcast production company Stak. Originally provided fortnightly, this was increased to a weekly show at the beginning of the 09/10 football season, mainly due to repeated listener requests. In October 2015, the podcast became biweekly with a preview show of the weekend's football going out on a Friday followed by a show on Monday reflecting on the weekend's action and previewing any midweek games that may be occurring.

It is currently presented by Marcus Speller, Luke Moore, Pete Donaldson, Jim Campbell and Vithushan Ehantharajah. It mainly focuses on the Premier League and international football, and to a lesser extent the English Football League, Italian, German, Spanish and Scottish leagues.

== Podcast ==
The podcast began in April 2007 and was being recorded in the kitchen of presenter Luke Moore's rented house in Harlesden with a couple of old microphones and a MiniDisc player. It originally featured Christopher Apples and Chimmers "Chimmers" Chimmers. Chimmers left the show after 1 episode, and was replaced with David Nugent for episode 2. Half way through episode 2 Chimners returned, before being again replaced by Nugent for episode 3. Episode 4 saw Apples appearing as a special guest in place of Nugent, who had now decided to leave the show. He was replaced with Chimmers for the remainder of the season, who was in turn replaced with Jim Campbell for the start of the 2007-2008 season. Apples left the show in 2008, to be replaced by XFM DJ Pete Donaldson. In June 2009, the podcast reached the number 1 spot in the iTunes sports podcast chart, beating off competition from titles from The Guardian and the BBC.

For the 2019–20 season The Football Ramble went daily, and in the summer of 2020 the Ramble team was expanded to include Kate Mason, Jules Breach, Andy Brassell and Vithushan Ehantharajah on the regular shows.

In 2023–24, Breach and Mason left, and the podcast turned away from releasing daily episodes.

The Football Ramble won Football Supporters' Association Podcast of the Year in 2024.

Brassell left on 15 July 2025 to focus on other projects.

=== On The Continent ===
In the 2017–18 season, The Football Ramble began a new podcast called On The Continent, which focused on European football and features journalists Andy Brassell and James Horncastle.

After a hiatus, On The Continent returned in September 2020 on the new Football Ramble Presents feed, with new host Dotun Adebayo accompanying Andy Brassell and a rotating third guest, typically one of Nicky Bandini, Lars Sivertsen, Miguel Delaney and David Cartlidge.

On The Continent was moved to its own podcast feed for the 2023–24 season.

== Syndication ==
=== SiriusXM ===
In Tuesday 6 October 2015, The Football Ramble became available twice a week on SiriusXM FC. Every Tuesday, from 1pmET, the regular Football Ramble show is syndicated nationally for Sirius subscribers in the United States. There was also a phone-in show aired on Thursdays but this stopped for the 2016–17 season.

== Live events ==
The Football Ramble has also evolved into a live theatre show. These events have been in locations in the UK, including London, Manchester and Edinburgh. Shows outside the UK have included Dublin, Ireland, the US, Canada, and Oslo, Norway.

In 2016, The Football Ramble toured the UK in spring and autumn, the latter tour culminating in a sold-out show to a capacity crowd at the 1,200 Hackney Empire in east London. Support for these shows was provided by Doc Brown.

In 2019, the Football Ramble toured the UK and the USA across 19 shows in 17 different cities including London, Manchester, Birmingham, Glasgow, New York, Toronto and Chicago. The tour was met with critical acclaim. Support for this tour was provided by comedians Maisie Adam and Chloe Petts.

In September 2024, the Football Ramble returned to the stage for the first time in five years with a sold out show at the London Palladium. The events were less structured than the regular shows, including interaction with the audience and questions, and more of a comedy focus.

== Book ==
The Football Ramble - By Four Men Who Love The Game They Hate is a book written by the presenters and published in October 2016 by Penguin Random House through their Century imprint. It debuted at no.1 in the Amazon Sports chart and was the highest selling non-fiction audiobook on Amazon in the first two weeks of release. The Daily Express gave it four out of five stars and commented '...whether you're a season ticket holder or a Sunday League player, there's something here for every type of football fan'.

== Media appearances ==
The Podcast was found in the Championship Manager 2010 video game as one of the 'media outlets' who review manager progress throughout the season.

The Football Ramble has been featured in various Football and non-football publications. Football Punk, Four Four Two and The London Paper have all featured lengthy articles in and around the podcast. All members have appeared on Sky News, debating various footballing matters.

== Regular cast ==
- Marcus Speller
- Jim Campbell
- Pete Donaldson
- Luke Moore
- Vithushan Ehantharajah

Occasional guests:

- David Cartlidge
- Lars Sivertsen

== Honours ==
The Football Ramble's honours
Type	Competition	Titles	Year
Domestic	Football Supporters' Association Podcast of the Year	1	2024
