= Football Superstars =

2008 video game

- Developer(s): Monumental Games (2008-2011), Coli Games UK (2014-2020)
- Publisher(s): Cybersports [now defunct] / Coli Games UK
- Platform(s): Microsoft Windows
- Release: December 31, 2008
- Genre(s): Association football, Sports simulation
- Mode(s): Single player, multiplayer

Football Superstars was a free-to-play massively multiplayer online football game originally developed by Monumental Games and published by Cybersports until the company went into administration. From late 2014 until its closure in February 2020, the game had been developed and published by Coli Games UK.

After a server crash, the decision was subsequently taken to not restore its servers, thus resulting in the game's closure on February 19, 2020. The reasons cited were low player activity as well as server problems.

A new project titled 'The Final Third' was purportedly under development since September 2020. As of July 5, 2024, Coli Games Ltd. applied for dissolution, and The Final Third was officially shelved, with no evidential development ever being published.

== Development ==
The BETA version of Football Superstars was released in November 2008, with community members providing feedback on the overall gameplay elements; the official release launched on December 31, 2008. Several updates and patches were made throughout the game's lifespan, improving stability and gameplay.

In 2012, the team suspended any development of the game, focusing on a Unity-based project called Striker Superstars. In late 2014, Football Superstars game development resumed under its new developer and publisher Coli Games UK until its closure in 2020.

== Features ==
Football Superstars allowed players to team up with other players globally and play in a PvP environment. The outfield team were human-operated whilst goalkeepers were controlled by the AI. Players could train their “Superstars” to become better players by visiting the gyms or purchasing upgraded boots and skills. Players could also increase their fame levels by visiting bars and restaurants and buying drinks. A higher fame level is attributed to greater match rewards.

== Virtual Currency ==
There were two currencies in Football Superstars; 'Dollars' and 'Credits'. Players earned 'Dollars' by playing competitive games, and could purchase 'Credits' from the official website. Players could also spend `Credits` on Superstar Management. Briefly, players could exchange 'Dollars' for 'Credits'.

== Subscription ==
Football Superstars adopted a free-to-play model with a micro-transaction type monetisation.

== Player Managed Clubs (PMC) ==
Player Managed Clubs (PMC) were the equivalent of guilds, allowing players to create their own teams, recruit their own players and compete in online events and tournaments against other user-generated PMCs. Within the PMC hierarchy, the manager could nominate Captain, Scouts, Coach, Members and recruits. Each of these roles had a varied level of responsibility in-game.

== Superstar Management ==
Released in August 2010, Superstar Management allowed players to improve their player's stats through the official website.

== Fame ==
'Fame' was a reward earned by playing competitive matches and making in-game store purchases. 'Fame Points' (FP) were used to upgrade your fame level. There were 28 fame levels; commencing from Local Newcomers to International Superstars. Once you had enough FP, you were allowed the opportunity of in-game newspaper, radio, and TV interviews to boost your fame level.
