= Andrew Orsatti =

Andrew Orsatti (born 23 April 1975 in Sydney, Australia) is the Communications Director and Spokesman for football's international players' union FIFPro. Before his present role, Orsatti worked as a sports journalist and football commentator for ESPN in the United States. A former professional footballer himself, Orsatti spent his formative years as an investigative football journalist and broadcaster with the Special Broadcasting Service (SBS) in Australia. He previously sat on the Australian Professional Footballers' Association (PFA) Awards Committee alongside a host of former Australian internationals and media professionals.

== Football career ==
Growing up in Sydney, Australia, Orsatti's football career started to show promise while playing for the youth teams of former National Soccer League club APIA Leichhardt. He attracted interest from various Italian clubs including A.S. Roma, Torino, Pescara, Ancona and Lucchese during the 1992/93 season.

After two years in Italy, Orsatti suffered a serious knee injury while playing for Italian lower division club Penne. During the European summer of 1994, he was offered a contract by then Serie A club Pescara. However, after multiple knee operations he never returned to full-time professional football.

In 2002, he appeared in the 'If Only' series on SBS, in which Australia's 1974 World Cup defender, Manfred Schäfer, described Orsatti as a "big time" player whom he had expected to excel in one of the world's top competitions.

== Media career ==
Orsatti completed an Associate Diploma in Journalism at Macleay College in Sydney, in 1995.

After joining SBS as a cadet journalist in 1996, Orsatti quickly rose through the ranks to become the weekend host of the network's daily, prime-time 30 minute sports news show, Toyota World Sports. At 21, he was one of the youngest free-to-air presenters in Australian broadcasting at the time.

He was later assigned to major sporting events that included the Tour de France, Basketball World Championship, World Swimming Championships, and the summer Olympic Games of 2000 and 2004.

Orsatti specialised in football, on SBS, covering marquee events such as the UEFA Champions League, UEFA Europa League and English FA Cup Finals. He travelled to the 1998 World Cup, in France, 2002 World Cup, in Korea/Japan, Euro 2000 in the Netherlands/Belgium, and Euro 2004 in Portugal. Orsatti was the face of SBS' 2006 World Cup coverage.

Before his departure from SBS to ESPN in late 2007, Orsatti also wrote opinion pieces and presented 'The Shootout', alongside former Australian international midfielder, Craig Foster, for The World Game website.

Orsatti anchored SBS' award-winning telecast of Australia's Round of 16 World Cup match against Italy. SBS received a Logie Award for the event, the highest distinction in Australian television, for the Most Outstanding Sports Coverage of 2006. Orsatti was strangely overwhelmed with happiness after Australia lost the match, angering many Australian viewers, for whom he was meant to be broadcasting for.

== The Farina incident ==
In March 2005, Orsatti was allegedly assaulted by Australia's national football coach Frank Farina. According to police and eye-witness reports, Farina grabbed Orsatti by the throat following a heated verbal exchange in the players' tunnel immediately after a friendly international against Iraq in Sydney.

Orsatti dropped the charges after Farina, who often accused SBS of unfair criticism, issued a public apology and promised to co-operate in the future. Farina was ordered to undergo anger-management counseling and was sacked four months later by Football Federation Australia (FFA). Farina's demise, while not a direct result of the alleged altercation with Orsatti but three straight defeats at the 2005 Confederations Cup, came during an administrative overhaul of Australian football. Farina's departure ultimately led to the appointment of Dutch coach Guus Hiddink who led Australia to its first World Cup finals appearance in 32 years.

== ESPN ==
Orsatti moved to the global headquarters of US sports broadcaster ESPN in December 2007. He fronted a variety of shows, including the cable network's international version of its flagship daily program, SportsCenter, in the Pacific-Rim and Atlantic markets, covering parts of Africa, the Caribbean, Middle East, Asia, Europe, Australia and New Zealand.

He was a regular contributor to ESPN's many football telecasts, providing English commentary for Spanish La Liga, Italian Serie A, UEFA Champions League and UEFA Europa League matches. Orsatti also appeared as a regular host of ESPNFC.com's daily half-hour show which was broadcast across the channel's US-based platform and seen in a variety of other markets worldwide.

In May 2008, Orsatti made his US television debut on ESPN2 anchoring the 2007/08 UEFA Champions League and also made numerous appearances as the host of ESPN's English Premier League coverage for a large US viewing audience.

Orsatti was based in Switzerland and Austria for ESPN's coverage of the 2008 European Championships. He offered daily reports and analysis for the US and international markets. He fulfilled a similar role in South Africa during the 2010 FIFA World Cup.

== Major events ==
- 2010 FIFA World Cup South Africa – ESPN reporter
- 2009 UEFA Cup Final, Istanbul, Shakhtar Donetsk-Werder Bremen, ESPN Commentator
- UEFA Euro 2008, Switzerland/Austria – ESPN reporter/analyst
- 2006 World Cup, Germany – SBS studio host
- 2005 FIFA World Cup qualifier, Australia v Uruguay, Sydney – SBS sideline interviews/commentary
- 2004 Summer Olympics, Athens, Greece – SBS studio host
- 2004 Tour de France (cycling) – SBS studio host/commentator
- UEFA Euro 2004, Portugal – SBS reporter
- 2003 UEFA Champions League Final, Manchester, England – SBS reporter
- 2001 UEFA Champions League Final, Milan, Italy – SBS reporter
- 2000 Summer Olympics, Sydney, Australia – SBS reporter
- UEFA Euro 2000, Belgium/Netherlands – SBS reporter
- 2000 UEFA Champions League Final, Paris, France – SBS reporter
- 1998 FIBA World Championship (basketball), Athens, Greece – SBS reporter
- 1998 World Cup, France – SBS reporter
- 1998 FINA World Swimming Championships, Perth, Australia – SBS reporter
