= Football Italia =

- Title card from April 1995
- Presented by: James Richardson (1992–2006); Mark Chapman (2007–2008); Laura Esposto (2007–2008)
- Narrated by: Kenneth Wolstenholme (1992–2001); Jonny Gould (2001–2002)
- Country of origin: United Kingdom
- Original language: English

Original release
- Network: Channel 4 (1992–2002); British Eurosport (2002–2005); Bravo (2005–2006); Five (2007–2008)
- Release: 6 September 1992 – 2008

Football Italia was a television programme in the United Kingdom, showing Italian football, that ran from 1992 to 2002 on Channel 4, and continued until 2008 on other channels. It was known as Football Italiano in its final season.

The show centred on live coverage of Serie A, the top division in the Italian football league system. James Richardson presented the show for a large part of its existence.

The first live match shown was a 3–3 draw between Sampdoria and Lazio on 6 September 1992, attracting three million UK viewers. Gazzetta Football Italia, a highlights show, became the highest-rated Saturday morning programme in Channel 4's history at the time, with around 800,000 viewers a week in its first season, 1992–93. At its peak in the 1990s, Football Italia attracted over three million viewers, and remains the most watched programme in the UK about a non-British domestic football league. Richardson was popular for his humour and his ability to avoid many of the clichés of football presenting.

After being shown on Five in the 2007–08 season, Football Italiano was cancelled by the channel and did not continue elsewhere on television. In 2026, the BBC began airing live Serie A coverage: whilst not branded as Football Italia, it used the iconic theme music and was regarded by some as a spiritual continuation.

== History ==
Serie A was first shown regularly in Britain in 1988 on Channel 4's partner broadcaster in Wales, S4C. In 1990, British Satellite Broadcasting brought the first live Italian football to a small number of British homes with squarials on The Sports Channel, which later became BSkyB's Sky Sports.

=== Channel 4 (1992–2002) ===
In 1992, Channel 4 acquired the rights to broadcast Serie A in the United Kingdom, paying £1.5m for coverage for the 1992–93 season. Football Italia was started as a response to several factors: the English top-flight was no longer on free-to-air terrestrial television but on BSkyB, England star player Paul Gascoigne had transferred to Lazio and S4C's European football programme Sgorio had good ratings. Italy's Serie A contained many of the world's best players, with its clubs paying spectacularly high transfer fees. The quality of English football was seen as lower, partly due to its 1985–90 ban from UEFA competitions, brought on by hooliganism.

Channel 4 had brief experience of showing football: Martin Tyler reported on the 1983 Brazilian Cup Final, and in 1985, it carried ITV's live coverage of an Australia–Scotland World Cup qualifier. The Women's FA Cup was prominently televised on Channel 4 from 1989 until 1993 to millions of viewers.

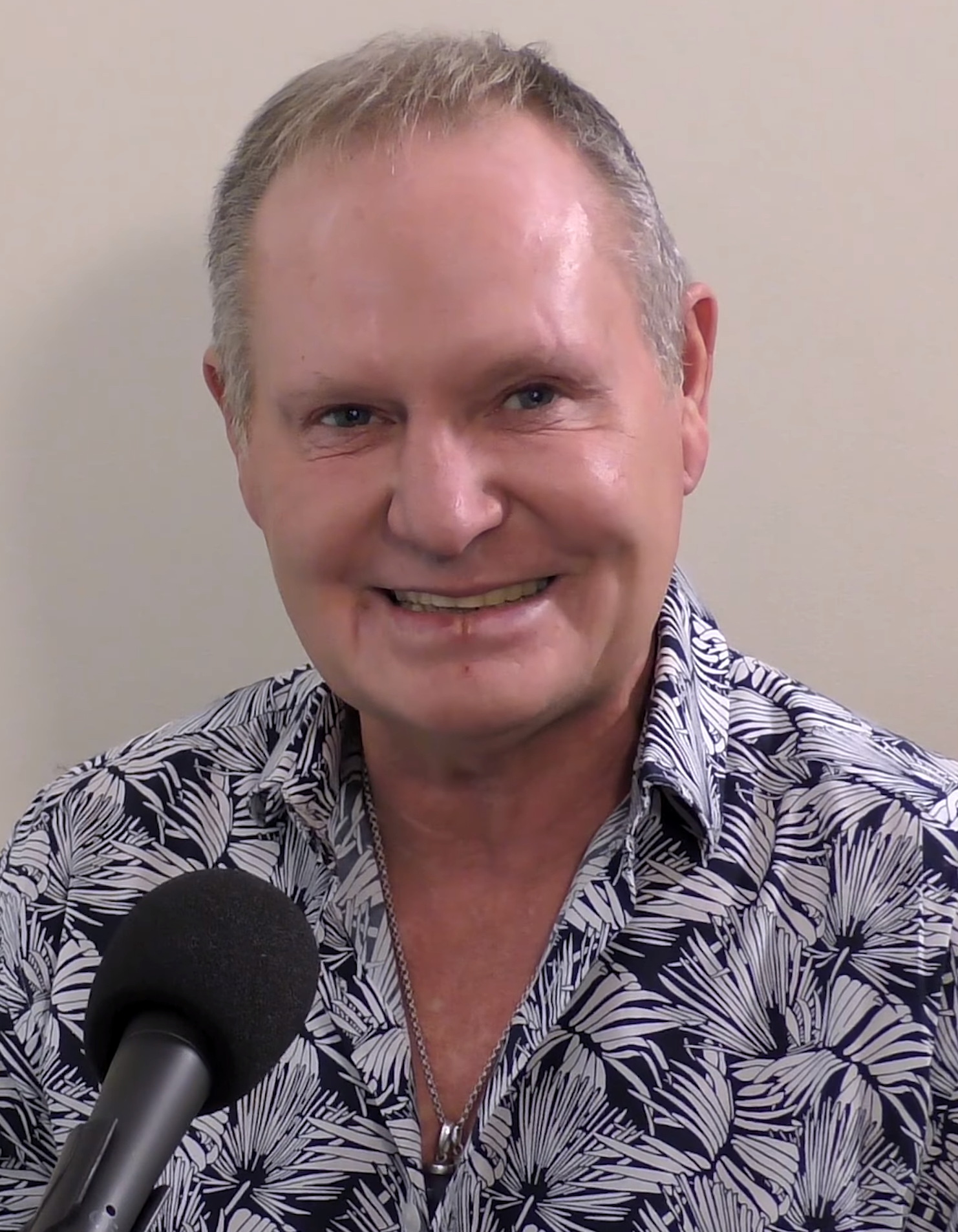
Paul Gascoigne's 1992 transfer to Lazio was a major factor for the show's launch.

Television production company Chrysalis had worked with Paul Gascoigne on a documentary about his return from injury called Gascoigne – The Fightback. Afterwards, Gascoigne said to producer Neil Duncanson that it was a shame that British viewers would be unable to see his Serie A games. England players David Platt and Des Walker were also with Serie A clubs at the time. Chrysalis approached the Italian Football Federation regarding UK broadcast rights for the Lazio games. The Federation were unwilling to offer the rights to just Lazio's games, but encouraged a bid for the rights to show all Serie A games. Channel 4 outbid Sky to take the UK rights for Serie A. This also involved negotiations between Channel 4 and RAI, the holder of the league's international rights for 1992–93.

On 6 September 1992, Channel 4 transmitted its first live Italian match – Sampdoria v Lazio. Gascoigne did not play due to injury, but the broadcast had three million viewers. Veteran broadcaster Kenneth Wolstenholme linked off screen, and Peter Brackley and Paul Elliott commentated.

Paul Gascoigne was the intended presenter of Gazzetta, a highlights programme. The title was a play on his nickname, Gazza, and the programme contained voiceovers by Wolstenholme. Gascoigne hosted the first few episodes, but didn't always turn up when he was supposed to film, and he was soon replaced by James Richardson, a producer who had not worked in front of the camera previously. Gascoigne continued to be the subject of many interviews and reports in the series.

Richardson became the host of the series's main two programmes: the live weekly Sunday afternoon match titled Football Italia, commentated on by Brackley (or sometimes Gary Bloom), and Gazzetta Football Italia on Saturday mornings, which contained the highlights of the previous week's matches and a piece on Italian culture. It would also consist of interviews with players, often Gascoigne, usually walking around an Italian city. These were often deliberately humorous, such as when Richardson performed the lambada with Attilio Lombardo.

A regular part of Gazzetta had Richardson explaining football stories from Italian newspapers, as he sat in the sunshine outside a café. During the last series, which was broadcast in the early hours of the morning, Richardson sat at a café outside the Pantheon, usually in front of a large ice cream or dessert, and a proportion of each course would vanish between each set of match highlights.

Other contributors to the series included Don Howe, Luther Blissett, Ray Wilkins and Joe Jordan.

Notable broadcasts included a 1995 Genoa v Milan match abandoned at half time. A Genoa fan had been murdered before the game, and the spread of the news sparked crowd trouble.

Football Italia: Mezzanotte (Midnight) was a late-night programme with coverage of the Italian Sunday night game. Broadcast weekly from 1993–94 on Tuesday nights, Mezzanotte was shown on Thursday night in 2002 and on Sundays after moving to Bravo in 2006.

Channel 4 also covered some Italian international matches live, including Italy's 1998 World Cup qualifying playoffs against Russia, which finished 2–1 on aggregate. A light-hearted trailer for the matches, with the voiceover "Will the Russians rub their faces in it?" while showing an Italian fan's face being rubbed in a plate of pasta, led to questions in the Italian parliament and caused 12 complaints (not upheld) to the ITC. Richardson said: "Everywhere Channel Four was being labelled as anti-Italian. In the end we re-enacted a spoof version where Pierluigi Casiraghi shoved my face in a plate of spaghetti."

For the 2000–01 Serie A season, the Sunday afternoon live games became more infrequent. The most telling sign came when Channel 4 abandoned coverage of the 2001 title decider with seven minutes remaining, the match having been disrupted by a pitch invasion by fans of Roma. Just twelve months earlier, Channel 4 had accommodated schedule changes, when a rainstorm held up Juventus's unsuccessful 1999–2000 title bid. Channel 4 showed their final live Serie A match on 17 June 2001, between Roma and Parma.

Live coverage was abandoned altogether in 2001–02, which was Serie A's final season on Channel 4.

=== British Eurosport (2003–2005) ===
After Channel 4 dropped Italian football, Serie A returned to British screens halfway through the 2002–03 season when British Eurosport bought the rights. Granada had considered bidding for the rights in April 2002, but didn't do so.

Eurosport's weekly live match was the "showpiece" Sunday evening 7pm kick-off, a fixture Channel 4 had never had the rights to show live.

British Eurosport held the rights until 2005, with Richardson again presenting.

=== Bravo (2005–2006) ===
Bravo and Setanta Sports covered Serie A under a joint agreement from 2005 to the end of the 2006–07 season. After poor viewing figures, Bravo discontinued their coverage on 23 December 2006. The 2006 Serie A scandal had tarnished the league's reputation, and had forcibly relegated top club Juventus.

Pundits on the programme at this time included Lee Sharpe and Ron Atkinson.

=== Five (2007–2008) ===
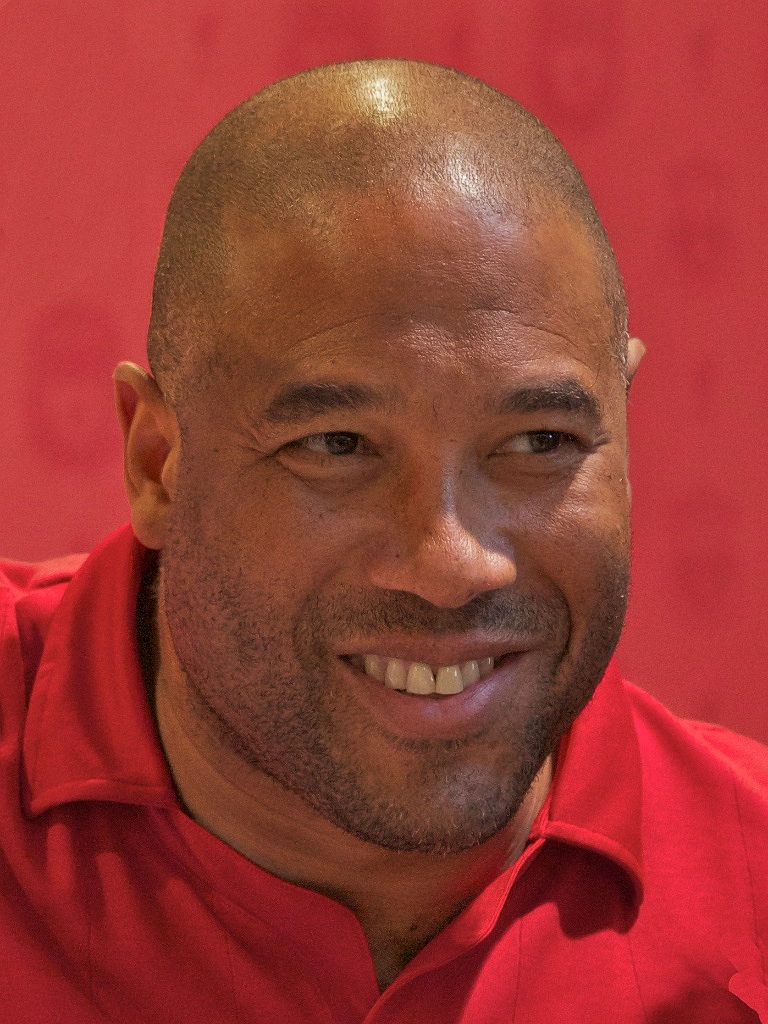
John Barnes was co-commentator on Five

Five gained the rights to broadcast Serie A highlights and live games in the 2007–08 season. The show thus returned to terrestrial television and live games were shown weekly at 1:30pm UK time on Sundays, as the original series on Channel 4.

Under the new name of Football Italiano, the show was presented by Mark Chapman and Italian sportscaster and model Laura Esposto. The first game shown was a 1–1 draw between Inter Milan and Udinese on Sunday 26 August 2007, with Tony Jones and John Barnes as the commentators. The opening theme song in this version of the show was "Phantom pt. II" by Justice.

The show's end was announced on 27 June 2008, on the Football Italiano website. The message, posted by James Sugure, read: "Unfortunately, it is now unlikely that Five will be continuing their Football Italiano television coverage of Serie A for the 2008–09 season. As a result, this website will now be suspended until further notice. On behalf of all the team here at Football Italiano, I would like to thank you for your support over the last year."

=== BBC (2026-present) ===
In February 2026, the BBC signed a sub-licensing deal with DAZN to air eight live Serie A fixtures on the corporation’s Scottish Gaelic-language channel, BBC Alba, and on the BBC iPlayer streaming platform: following Scotland’s qualification for that summer’s FIFA World Cup, the deal was presented as a way for Scottish audiences to see some of their international players in league action, with several of Scotland’s internationals having made successful moves to Serie A in the previous few years including Scott McTominay and Billy Gilmour at Napoli, and Lewis Ferguson at Bologna.

As a nod to the original Football Italia, a special BBC Alba ident (based by the Football Italia-themed Channel 4 ident) was used before the start of coverage: the Serie A’s world feed intro also used the original Football Italia theme tune. Presenters and commentators included Alex O’Henley, Derek Mackay, Derek Ferguson and Lorenzo Amoruso, whilst James Richardson also made a cameo appearance during BBC Alba’s coverage of Napoli vs Bologna. The games themselves used Serie A’s world feed footage, alongside Gaelic and English co-commentary produced by the BBC.

In preparation for the 2026-27 season, the BBC signed an expanded deal to air 38 live Serie A fixtures across the season: half of the games were to be aired on BBC Alba and iPlayer as previously with Gaelic and English presentation, whilst another 19 games are to be aired on iPlayer with presentation entirely in English using Serie A’s English-language world feed.

On 30 October 2026, the Derby della Maddonnina fixture between Milan and Inter was broadcast live across the UK on BBC Two, marking Italian football’s first appearance on free-to-air British television in over 16 years. James Richardson presented coverage pitchside from the San Siro, with a brief appearance from former Milan player Marcel Desailly and a pre-recorded half-time interview with Torino and Scotland player Nathan Patterson.

== Legacy ==
Italian football was absent from British TV for the 2008–09 season, other than live coverage of the Milan derby on BBC Three. From 2009–10 season up to 2012–13 season, coverage of Serie A was shown on ESPN, and since 2013–14 season, it has been shown on BT Sport. They show numerous live games per week during the Serie A season, including those of the Coppa Italia. ESPN do not, however, use the Football Italia title for their programmes. For part of the 2018/19 Serie A season onwards, the league is no longer shown on TV in Britain. Instead, a streaming service called Eleven Sports shows them, later having one of their matches simulcast on the STV Player in Scotland. Eleven Sports' first Serie A game involved Juventus playing away. It was made available live and free on Eleven's Facebook page. However, four months later, Eleven Sports ran into problems, and the rights passed to Premier Sports for the remainder of that season. The rights returned to BT Sport for the 2021/22 season.

Since Football Italia launched, a number of other European domestic leagues have been broadcast on British television. Ultimately, the series' popularity fell, as Italian football slipped behind first Spanish and then English in the UEFA Coefficients and the perceived level of quality. In particular, the end of the show coincided with the 2006 Italian football scandal, and a loss in reputation for Italian club football.

The 2018 BT Sport film Golazzo: The Football Italia Story took a nostalgic look back at the success of the Channel 4 programme and the influence it had on viewers, including young British footballers, who had free access to Serie A for the first time.

=== Golaço! ===
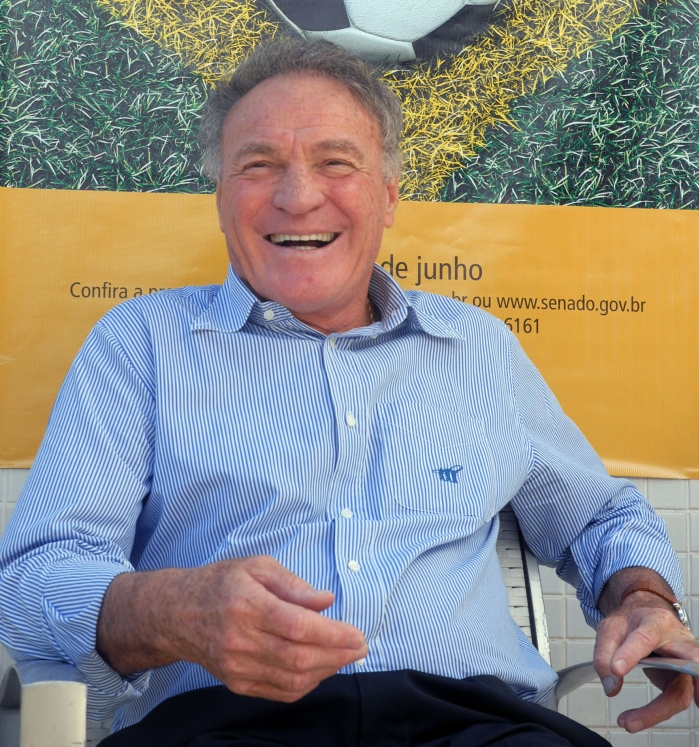
José Altafini, voice of "golaço"

The show became well known in popular culture for a shout of Golaço!, Portuguese for "fantastic goal", featured at the start and at the end of each show. The sound clip is of Italian television football commentator José Altafini, a Brazilian who played in Serie A for AC Milan, Napoli and Juventus.

"Golaço!" was transcribed as "Golaccio!" in the show's titles. However, James Richardson later added: "I heard Steve [DuBerry] who'd produced the music for the show say he'd wanted it to sound like 'go Lazio' because of Paul Gascoigne presenting it and so had added a twist to the soundbite."

=== Theme tune and idents ===
In 1992, the theme tune to the show was adapted with the addition of vocals to become "I'm Stronger Now" by Definitive Two. The shout of "Golaccio!" featured in the show's start and end titles was omitted from the song.

Channel 4 produced special idents specifically for its Italian football programmes in the 1990s. The channel's familiar multi-coloured "4" logo appeared, a football bounced off the logo to the sound of a cheering crowd, and the logo turned the colours of the Italian flag. This was in keeping with other idents the channel had made specially for NFL American football and sumo wrestling.

From 2026 BBC Alba uses the theme tune for their Serie A coverage.

=== Website and magazine ===
The Channel 4 version's producer, John D. Taylor, launched an accompanying website, initially under the Channel 4 web domain, also called Football Italia. After Channel 4 lost the rights to Serie A coverage in 2002, Taylor took full ownership, launching JDT Sports Productions and the website Football-Italia.net, which also included the magazine of the same name. The website was later sold to Tiro Media in 2014

== Channels ==
Football Italia has been shown on the following channels throughout its history:

- Channel 4: 1992–93, 1993–94, 1994–95, 1995–96, 1996–97, 1997–98, 1998–99, 1999–00, 2000–01, 2001–02
- British Eurosport: Last half of 2002–03, 2003–04, 2004–05
- Bravo: 2005–06, first half of 2006–07
- Five: 2007–08

== See also ==
- Football in Italy
