= Fantasy football (association) =

Fantasy sports game

Fantasy football is a game in which participants assemble an imaginary team of real-life football players and score points based on those players' actual statistical performance or their perceived contribution on the field of play. Usually fantasy football games are based on one division in a particular country, although there are variations. Fantasy football is now a significant industry due to websites dedicated to developing the fantasy football community, and betting sites hosting their own fantasy football games.

== History ==
Fantasy football was invented in 1990 by Italian journalist Riccardo Albini. Inspired by fantasy baseball (also known as Rotisserie, from the name of the place where the first players met, New York City restaurant La Rotisserie Française), Albini published fantasy football's rules for the first time through Studio Vit publisher, giving it the name Fantacalcio (calcio is the Italian word for football). Other journalists, such as Alberto Rossetti and Diego Antonelli, also contributed to the draft of the final version of the regulation.

A big contribution to the popularity of the game was given by the collaboration with the newspaper La Gazzetta dello Sport, which starting from the summer in 1994 hosted the game on its pages and provided the rankings necessary to calculate fantasy teams' scores. The initiative was a great editorial success: despite expecting that about 10,000 subscribers would participate, by the end of the year 70,000 subscribers had played the game.

Fantasy football rapidly spread from Italy to other European countries. It is known as fútbol fantasy in Spain, fantasy football in France and Fantasy Fußball or Fantacalcio in Germany. In the following years two fantasy football competitions have been created for the whole European confederation. They are managed by UEFA and linked to the two major continental club competitions, the UEFA Champions League (UEFA Champions League Fantasy Football Game) and the UEFA Europa League (UEFA Europa League Fantasy Football Game). Both competitions follow Albini's regulation, except that the goalkeepers that do not concede receive 2 points instead of 4, and transfers cost 2 points per player after the first game. The version of fantasy football in the United Kingdom is the largest, with over 9 million players. Fantasy Football Scout ranks fantasy football managers on their website based on past performance.

== Teams ==
Most fantasy football leagues, especially those run by national newspapers, ask participants to select 11 to 15 players within a price budget. There is usually a restriction on the number of players per club; a typical selection would be to select 1 goalkeeper, 4 defenders, 4 or 3 midfielders and 2 or 3 forwards. Some games are squad-based, where participants choose not just a first eleven but also a set of substitutes. Normally only 3 players can be used from one team.

In smaller leagues played by a small group of people, players are bought by bidding between the rival managers rather than for a set amount of money. This means a particular player can only play for one team, and thus any points he accrues are credited to that team only. Typically, most leagues offer the chance to transfer players in and out of the team as the season progresses, in case of injury, suspension or loss of form.

== Points scoring ==
Points are then gained or deducted depending on players' performances. Points systems vary between games, but points are typically awarded for some or all of the following achievements:

- Playing in a match (or part of a match e.g. at least 60 minutes)
- Scoring a goal
- Earning an assist (the pass or touch leading to the goal)
- Keeping a clean sheet (goalkeepers, midfielders, and defenders only)
- Saving a penalty (goalkeeper only)
- Goalkeeper saves three shots or more
- Win for the player's team

As well as the above, points can be deducted for some or all of the following:

- Conceding a goal (goalkeepers and defenders only)
- Receiving a yellow or red card
- Missing a penalty kick
- Scoring an own goal
- Getting substituted
- Loss for the player's team

The number of points each achievement or offence is credited with varies between different games. For example, in the Daily Telegraph league, three points are awarded for an assist, and five for a goal. Due to the emphasis placed on assists and goal-scoring, the value of players can differ greatly from real-life football, both in terms of individuals and position. For example, Claude Makélélé, considered to be one of the best midfielders in real life, was rarely considered a valuable player in fantasy football because he was not an attacking player, as evidenced by three league goals in eight years at Real Madrid and Chelsea, and none in 71 appearances for the France national team.

For this reason, some fantasy football games changed their scoring system to put a greater emphasis on real player performance instead of emphasizing goals and assists. For instance, the game KAISER uses player scores gained by computer analyses based on dozens of different criteria. These scores are supplied by the data provider OPTA.

The game Oulala Fantasy Football used a sophisticated scoring system. With 70 different points scoring criteria, which included a matrix of any action that a player can perform, the criteria of 70 rose to a total of 275 dependent on each player's position on the field. Detailed actions included corners won, shots on/off target, successful dribbles and provoking an offside as well as many more others. These stats are sourced from Opta Sports and update in real time. Oulala ceased to exist in 2018.

== Public vs private leagues ==
Most fantasy football games provide a choice of joining either private or public leagues. Public leagues are open to everybody and mostly there are leagues for each club or leagues for each country. League members then compete against each other and in some cases there are cash prizes for winning those leagues. Private leagues let the manager play with their friends only. Some games combine this with having unique teams in the leagues. This means that every Premier League player exists only once. As a result, there is a lot of activity on the transfer market where players are exchanged in between the community members.

== Mini-leagues ==
At the start of the season, fantasy football mini-leagues can be set up in various ways.

=== Open ===
The open option exists for leagues in which every football player can be chosen by every fantasy manager. The fantasy managers usually have a limited budget, and every football player has been assigned a price. Fantasy managers must stay within their allocated budget, but can select any player from the league.

=== Draft ===
The draft option exists for leagues in which every football player can only be chosen once. There is a set order for player selection, and the fantasy managers may or may not have a budget to work from. Draft leagues often have trading between fantasy managers.

=== Auction ===
The auction option exists for leagues in which every football player can only be chosen once. Fantasy managers are given a budget, with which they can bid on football players. If they win the auction for a player, that player can be selected in their team only.
