= Mina Rzouki =

BBC journalist and broadcaster

Mina Rzouki (born 18 August 1982) is a journalist and broadcaster for the BBC.

Rzouki has presented and appeared as a guest on the "Euro Leagues" radio programme on BBC Radio 5 Live. She regularly contributes to the Up All Night show World Football Phone-In and has appeared on the BBC show Fighting talk, as well as appearing as a pundit on Talksport.

Despite regular appearances on the BBC, ESPN, CNN and TNT Sports, Rzouki faces sexist abuse online due to her gender in a predominantly male industry.

Rzouki also writes for ESPN and the Daily Star. She has regularly appeared on the Total Football podcast for the Daily Telegraph renamed the Telegraph Audio Football Club for the 2018-19 football season. Rzouki has also guested as host when regular host Thom Gibbs has been away. In addition, she co-hosts the Serie Awesome podcast for ESPN FC, alongside Italian journalist Gabriele Marcotti and The Guardian's Nicky Bandini.

== Personal life ==
She is a supporter of Italian club Juventus FC She has lived all her life in Hammersmith, London.
