= The Blizzard (magazine) =

British quarterly football magazine

- Issue zero front cover
- Editor: Jonathan Wilson
- Frequency: Quarterly
- Publisher: Blizzard Media Ltd
- First issue: 4 March 2011
- Country: United Kingdom
- Based in: Sunderland
- Language: English
- Website: www.theblizzard.co.uk

The Blizzard is a quarterly football magazine edited by Jonathan Wilson, published in both download and hard copy formats by Blizzard Media. The magazine was originally sold on a pay-what-you-like basis.

The Blizzard took its name from an eclectic Victorian Sunderland-based newspaper set up by Sidney Duncan, which ran for 12 issues and was established in 1893. Wilson, who also comes from Sunderland, wanted to replicate the eclectic nature of this publication. The Editor's Note, which began Issue Zero, set out the magazine's ethos as an alternative to that which was currently available in football media. Jonathan Wilson wrote:

"I'd been frustrated for some time by the constraints of the mainstream media and, in various press rooms and bars across the world, I'd come to realise I wasn't the only one who felt journalism as a whole was missing something, that there should be more space for more in-depth pieces, for detailed reportage, history and analysis. Was there a way, I wondered, to accommodate articles of several thousand words? Could we do something that was neither magazine nor book, but somewhere in between? As I floated thoughts and theories to anyone who would listen, I became aware there were other writers so keen to break the shackles of Search Engine Optimisation and the culture of quotes-for-quotes'-sake that they were prepared to write for a share of potential profit, that the joy of writing what they wanted and felt was important outweighed the desire to be paid."

The Blizzard accommodates longer articles than a typical football magazine, with pieces up to 8000 words long. Topics are often more obscure and esoteric than other magazines, aiming to either cover little-explored components of football culture, or to take new perspectives on previously well-explored issues. While the initial issue was published virtually, a limited print run was released. All subsequent issues have appeared both as pdfs, and in-print.
