= James Richardson (presenter) =

English television presenter and journalist

- Born: James Oliver Richardson; 29 May 1966 (age 60); Bristol, England
- Occupations: Television presenter Journalist
- Years active: 1992–present

James Oliver Richardson OSI (born 29 May 1966), also known as AC Jimbo, is an English television presenter and journalist.

He is best known as a former presenter of Channel 4's Football Italia programme and former host of The Guardian Football Weekly podcast. He currently hosts BT Sport's The UEFA Champions League Goals Show, World's Strongest Man for Channel 5 and The Totally Football Show podcast. He is also employed by the Premier League, featuring in content related to Fantasy Premier League and for overseas-rights holders.

He is an AS Roma fan and multilingual, speaking his native English, Italian, French, Spanish, and Portuguese.

== Football Italia ==
Bristol-born Richardson was the anchor of Football Italia on Channel 4 from 1992 until 2002. Football Italia saw Richardson become well known and the show was cult viewing for football fans in the UK. Football Italia consisted of two weekend shows.

On a Saturday morning, Richardson presented Gazzetta Football Italia, a magazine show which reviewed the previous weekend's games, as well as keeping viewers up to date with the latest Italian football news. It would feature Richardson sitting in a café in a picturesque setting, usually with a cappuccino, a pastry or gelato, and a pile of Italian sports newspapers which he would use to show viewers the latest football stories and headlines. He would interview players and managers on a regular basis for the show, since he was able to speak Italian.

Meanwhile, on a Sunday he hosted live coverage from the stadium of one of the top Italian games that particular day. He also presented La Partita and Mezzanotte, a Sunday-night and midweek show, respectively, with highlights of one of the top matches of the weekend.

== Later broadcasting career ==
From 2002 until 2005, Richardson moved with the Serie A rights first to British Eurosport live coverage, then to Bravo TV's Football Italia Live and the return of Gazzetta Football Italia. Between 2007 and 2009, he co-presented Setanta Sports' The Friday Football Show and Football Matters shows with Rebecca Lowe. In 2011, Richardson also had a short stint on the BBC regional football programme Late Kick Off, for the South, West and South-West region.

Prior to his move to BT Sport in August 2013, he presented ESPN's coverage of live Italian football. At BT Sport he hosted live Serie A matches and the Sunday night round-up show, European Football Show, until its cancellation in 2017. He fronts The UEFA Champions League Goals Show since BT Sport won the rights to the competition.

Since 2016 to 2021, together with Jules Breach, he has hosted the Fantasy Premier League Show by Premier League Productions. Starting from 2021, Kelly Somers has partnered with Richardson for the Fantasy Premier League Show. It is available for viewing on the Premier League website and also the Premier League Facebook Page.

Richardson has also presented non-football related content and presented Bravo TV's first live PDC darts coverage alongside Dave Gorman during the 2010 European Darts Championship. He has also presented British Eurosport's live Tour de France cycling coverage between 2005 and 2013. Since 2011, Richardson has hosted the World's Strongest Man television coverage.

In 2018, he started co-presenting The Great Model Railway Challenge on Channel 5 with Tim Shaw, a show that sees teams of railway model enthusiasts compete against each other in a series of tasks with the aim of winning a prize in the grand finale.

In 2025, it was announced that Richardson would be a member of the joint DAZN / 5 presentation team for the first 32 team FIFA Club World Cup.

== Other media ==
Richardson also contributes articles to the football magazine, FourFourTwo, as their Italian football correspondent. He has contributed articles to The Guardian.

He hosted The Guardian's The World Cup Show for the 2006 World Cup. This turned into The Guardian Football Weekly podcast series featuring Monday and Thursday shows with Richardson as host and a panel of football journalists discussing the footballing week's events, both in England and across Europe. It was here he consolidated his reputation as a broadcaster who used puns and humour. Richardson also hosted a number of Football Weekly Live Shows which played to sold-out venues around the UK.

In summer 2017, after spending just over a decade with them, Richardson left The Guardian and Football Weekly, to join the brand new podcast The Totally Football Show. This podcast is produced by Muddy Knees Media, of which Richardson is a shareholder, along with other former Football Weekly alumni: Iain Macintosh, and producer Ben Green. In November 2017, they staged their first live show in The Glee Club, in Birmingham. Richardson also hosts another Muddy Knees Media podcast, Golazzo: The Totally Italian Football Show a show featuring James Horncastle and Gabriele Marcotti, which in its initial run featured a weekly round up of Italian football, along with an historical look at Italian football of the past. Its second run now exclusively looks at historical stories and personalities of Italian football.

Providing Internet content, Richardson hosted the online coverage of England's World Cup 2010 qualifying game with Ukraine on 10 October 2009 alongside former England coach Sven-Göran Eriksson.

Outside of football, in late 2015, Richardson became an online movie critic, creating his own YouTube channel JimboVision. In 2017, he started hosting a movie podcast Truth & Movies, which he left in 2018.
