= The Anfield Wrap =

British media company

Anfield Wrap
- Language: English

Cast and voices
- Hosted by: Neil Atkinson

Publication
- Original release: 1 August 2011

Related
- Website: theanfieldwrap.com

The Anfield Wrap (TAW Player) is a collective of podcasts, radio shows, videocasts, live shows, magazine and website articles predominantly about Liverpool F.C. as well as the culture and music in the city of Liverpool.

== Content ==
Described by sports journalist Barry Glendenning as "essential listening for Liverpool fans", and averaging over 200,000 weekly downloads in over 200 countries including Vatican City they have sold out venues in Australia, USA, Scandinavia as well as Ireland, Hong Kong, Dubai and England and a stage at the Sound City Festival.

As well as fan culture the shows have also contained interviews with Kevin Keegan, Jürgen Klopp, Kenny Dalglish, Brendan Rodgers, Rafa Benitez, Gerard Houllier, Rick Parry, Jamie Carragher, Kieran Maguire, Lucas Leiva and Xabi Alonso. As of July 2017 the shows had received a total of 28,000,000 downloads worldwide.

The Anfield Wrap have made and appeared on video clips for ITV News, Sky Sports, Premier League World, and BBC’s Newsbeat as well as making an appearance on the Fox Sports documentary Being Liverpool, and representing fan views on issues such as ticket prices and kick off times.

== Management ==
Directors/Officers: Neil Atkinson, Andy Heaton, John Gibbons, Wayne Scholes, Colin Zito,

== Awards ==
The Anfield Wrap was awarded the ‘Podcast Of The Year’ award in 2012 and 2015 by The Football Supporters Federation, in 2015 according to the Liverpool Echo presenter and writer Neil Atkinson led The Anfield Wrap delegation to the stage before delivering a “barnstorming acceptance speech”. The Anfield Wrap won ‘Best Football Podcast’ at The Football Blogging Awards in 2016 and was The Football Supporters’ Federation ‘Radio Show Of The Year’ 2016. They were nominated for ‘Club Podcast of the Year’ at the 2017 Football Supporters Federation Awards. At the 2018 British Podcast Awards The Anfield Wrap won silver, behind only Kermode and Mayo's Film Review in the listeners choice award. On 31 October The Anfield Wrap was announced as a nominee for the ‘Fan Media of the Year’ award at the 2018 Football Supporters Federation Awards. At the 2019 British Podcast Awards The Anfield Wrap again picked up second place silver medal for the ‘listeners choice’ award. At the 2019 Football Supporters Federation Awards The Anfield Wrap won ‘Best Fan Media’. It was shortlisted for the Fan Media of the Year at the Football Supporters' Association awards in 2020 and 2021. In November 2023, The Anfield Wrap was nominated in the Club Podcast of the Year category at the Football Supporters' Association awards.
