= FourFourTwo =

Monthly football magazine

- Cover of November 2024 issue, 30th anniversary issue
- Editor: James Andrew
- Frequency: Monthly
- Total circulation: 27,068 monthly circulation for 2022 (June–Dec 2015)
- First issue: 1994
- Company: Future
- Country: United Kingdom
- Based in: Paddington, England
- Language: Languages English; Bulgarian; Korean; Portuguese; Swedish; Turkish; Indonesian; Thai
- Website: fourfourtwo.com
- ISSN: 1355-0276

FourFourTwo is an association football magazine published by British company Future. Issued monthly, it published its 300th edition in May 2019. It takes its name from the football formation of the same name, 4–4–2. Future acquired the magazine from Haymarket Media Group in 2018. Haymarket previously acquired Future's earlier football magazine Total Football in 2001 in exchange of subscriber list and the rights to the masthead of its defunct internet magazine The Net, Haymarket later absorbed Total Football into FourFourTwo.

In 2008 FourFourTwo entered into a three-year shirt sponsorship deal with Swindon Town.

== Rankings and awards ==
FourFourTwo has a number of annual rankings and awards. In 2007, the magazine put together its first FFT100, their list of the 100 best footballers in the world. At the end of the 2012–13 Premier League season, FourFourTwo announced its first Stats Zone Awards. In May 2015, the inaugural list of the 50 best Asian players in world football was announced. They have also produced a top 50 of players from the Football League.

Best football player in the world
Year	Player	Club
2007	(Brazil) Kaká	(Italy) Milan
2008	(Portugal) Cristiano Ronaldo	(England) Manchester United
2009	(Argentina) Lionel Messi	(Spain) Barcelona
2010	(Argentina) Lionel Messi	(Spain) Barcelona
2011	(Argentina) Lionel Messi	(Spain) Barcelona
2012	(Argentina) Lionel Messi	(Spain) Barcelona
2013	(Portugal) Cristiano Ronaldo	(Spain) Real Madrid
2014	(Portugal) Cristiano Ronaldo	(Spain) Real Madrid
2015	(Argentina) Lionel Messi	(Spain) Barcelona
2016	(Portugal) Cristiano Ronaldo	(Spain) Real Madrid
2017	(Argentina) Lionel Messi	(Spain) Barcelona
2018	(Argentina) Lionel Messi	(Spain) Barcelona
2019	(Argentina) Lionel Messi	(Spain) Barcelona
2020	(Poland) Robert Lewandowski	(Germany) Bayern Munich
2021	(Poland) Robert Lewandowski	(Germany) Bayern Munich
2022	(Norway) Erling Haaland	(Germany) Borussia Dortmund (England) Manchester City
2023	(Norway) Erling Haaland	(England) Manchester City
2024	(Spain) Rodri	(England) Manchester City
2025	(Spain) Lamine Yamal	(Spain) Barcelona

=== Other rankings ===
In April 2022, FourFourTwo ranked the best footballers of the 21st century. Lionel Messi was ranked as number 1. In September 2023, the magazine also ranked the 100 best football players of all time, with Messi once again ranking first.

== Other editions ==
- Dutch edition – first published in November 2018 by F&L Media

== See also ==
- World Soccer
- The Guardian
- Onze Mondial
- European Sports Magazines
