= The Socially Distant Sports Bar =

Comedy and sports podcast

- Genre: Sport, Comedy, Pop Culture
- Language: English, occasional Welsh

Cast and voices
- Hosted by: Steffan Garrero; Elis James; Mike Bubbins

Production
- Length: 120-190 minutes (originally 20 minutes)

Technical specifications
- Audio format: MP3

Publication
- No. of episodes: 286 regular, 61 MOMC specials, +26 Hoffi Pods
- Original release: March 31, 2020
- Provider: Nata Media
- Updates: (Weekly)

Reception
- Ratings: M- Mature

Related
- Website: www.distantpod.com

The Socially Distant Sports Bar is a comedy/sports podcast hosted by sports journalist and academic Steff Garrero with comedians Elis James and Mike Bubbins. It was created in response to the lack of live sport during the COVID-19 pandemic. The music for the podcast is played by James Dean Bradfield.

== Premise ==
The format was created by Garrero. Each of the presenters picks a short clip, then take turns to pick a feature-length documentary, followed by a second short clip each, ending with one of them choosing a book (originally three books were discussed) all related to sport. They discuss the clips, documentary and book as well as taking various detours to discuss a diverse range of subjects loosely related to the original clips. In March 2021 the second round of clips were made available to Patreon subscribers only and in April 2023 the Non-Patreon version of the podcast was split into two episodes, made available on Wednesdays and Fridays. The Patreon version continues to be released on Tuesdays. The podcast is signed to American podcast giant Wondery and produced by Garrero's Nata Media company.

== Reception ==
The podcast was included in The Telegraph's 50 Best Cultural Events of 2020 poll, being praised for its "unreasonably hilarious lockdown laughs".

In January 2021, the podcast won a Pod Bible poll winners award for best podcast in the Sport & Leisure category. It also won Best Comedy Sports Podcast at the inaugural Sports Podcast awards in 2022.

The podcast has been commended for "giving back" to the sporting community in Wales and sponsor a number of sports clubs including Cardiff Met WFC and the academy sides at Carmarthen Town.

== 2021 UK Tour ==
In April 2021 it was announced that the podcast would tour the UK in the Autumn of that year, visiting venues including The Hackney Empire, The Lowry in Salford and Cardiff's New Theatre. Following the original tour selling well, (including having multiple shows at Hackney and Cardiff) an extra arena show was added at Cardiff's Motorpoint Arena in February 2022. This show was re-arranged for February 2023 due to the continuing COVID-19 pandemic.

== Down The Clubhouse ==
Following the positive reception to the podcast the team were given the opportunity by BT Sport to take the format to television. In 2022 they recorded eight episodes of "Down The Clubhouse" using the same format of choosing sport-related video clips and discussing them. The show was filmed on location at the clubhouse of Cowbridge RFC in the Vale of Glamorgan in the spring of 2022 and aired through the summer of 2022.

== Sponsorships ==
The Patreon income has allowed for sponsorship of sports teams and other charitable causes. Teams sponsored include Carmarthen Town Academy, Cardiff Blue Dragons rugby league kids, Welsh Under 16 Rugby League Team, Anglesey Netball Team, Cardiff Schools Rugby, Cardiff Met Women's and Men's, and Blackwood Bowls. They also funded cabinets to house defibrillators at local sports clubs.

== Episodes ==
Episodes 1-50 -
Episode	Title	First Clip	Second Clip	Third Clip	Documentary	Fourth Clip	Fifth Clip	Sixth Clip	Book(s)
1	Do We Not Like This?	Jonathan Davies (Mike)	Kevin Keegan on Superstars (Elis)	Euro 88 Final (Steff)	"An Impossible Job" about Graham Taylor (Elis)	Wigan Winning the Middlesex Sevens (Steff)	Shane Warne's ball of the century (Mike)	Barry McGuigan (Elis)	Life Of Evel (Mike), McIlvanney On Boxing (Elis), In Sunshine or in Shadow (Steff)
2	Covfefe 19	Paul Thorburn's kick 1986 (Elis)	Terry Wogan holes the world's longest televised putt (Mike)	James Scott - prison boxer (Steff)	Small Potatoes: Who Killed the USFL (Mike)	Steve Robinson (Elis)	Wales & England V Scotland & Ireland 1980 (Steff)	Daley Thompson at the 1984 Olympics (Mike)	The Football Man (Elis), Friday Night Lights (Mike), Barbarian Days (Steff)
3	Milk and Biscuits	Angry John Sitton (Elis)	Magic Johnson in the 1992 All Star Game (Steff)	Stirling Moss interview from 2010 (Mike)	The Test (Steff)	Aston Villa favourite food 1995/96 (Elis)	Paul Sykes (Mike)	Serena's Golden Slam (Steff)	Instant Replay - The Green Bay Diary of Jerry Kramer (Mike), Those Feet (Elis), This Bloody Mary is the Last Thing I Own (Steff)
4	Oh Bobby!	Dick Butkus (Mike)	Derek Redmond at Barcelona '92 with his dad (Elis)	1987 Football League XI V Rest of the World (Steff)	Home & Away the 1984 Milk Cup Final (Elis)	Sam Burgess in the NRL Grand Final 2014 (Steff)	West Brom in China 1978 (Mike)	Francesco Totti playing 8 a side with his mates (Elis)	Brilliant Orange (Steff), Bobby Dazzler (Mike), The Glory Game (Elis)
5	You've Got to Die of Something	Jonah Lomu V England 1995 (Elis)	1973 Shamrock Rovers V Brazil (Steff)	John Facenda reads "If" (Mike)	Ice Guardians (Mike)	Bernard Hopkins confronts Joe Calzaghe (Steff)	Leeds Utd V West Brom 1971 (Elis)	Derek Quinnell debut (Mike)	The cyclist who went out in the cold (Steff), Barry Sheene (Mike), Born to run (Elis)
6	Waking up Next to a Bag of Cement	Shaun Williamson, singing before the Bowls (Mike)	Andy Powell's message to the troops (Steff)	England 3 Hungary 6, 1953 (Elis)	Next Goal Wins (Steff)	Chuck Wepner V Andre the Giant, 1976 (Elis)	Junior Kickstart, 1985 (Mike)	Kellogg's Start advert (Steff)	Knowing the Score (Steff), Today We Die a Little (Elis), 90 minutes of freedom (Mike)
7	Mother Teresa's Debit Card	Michael Owen & Neville Southall (Steff)	Simone Biles 2019 (Mike)	The Haka, 1973 style (Elis)	Panorama Millwall 1977 (Elis)	Chicago Cubs - Steve Bartman (Steff)	Eddie The Eagle... with added Burt Reynolds (Mike)	The Peter Reid clip about Lawrie Cunningham (Elis)	Up Pohnpei (Steff), Snake (Mike), Soccernomics (Elis)
8	14 Seconds	John Fury (Mike)	Wrexham 2 Arsenal 1, FA Cup 3rd Round, January 1992 (Elis)	Blues V Crusaders (Steff)	The Rugby Codebreakers (Mike)	The Tartan Flash (Mike)	Ian Wright meets his old teacher (Elis)	Mark Hughes' missing goal (Steff)	In the Mad Pursuit of Applause (Mike), Pants of Perspective (Steff), The Loneliness of the Long Distance Runner (Elis)
9	Dr Z	Moe Norman's Golf Swing (Mike)	Robbie Savage phones in to chat with Leighton James (Steff)	Kerri Strug's vault at the 1996 Olympics (Elis)	9.79* (Steff)	The world's oldest ultra (Steff)	Bullseye's worst prize ever (Mike)	Sunshine on Leith sung by Hibs fans (Elis)	The Fight (Steff), Living on the Volcano (Elis), Bringing the Heat (Mike)
10	Wimbledon or Bust	1969 League Cup Final (Mike)	Herman Maier crashing and then winning 2 Gold medals (Steff)	1987 Battle of Cardiff (Elis)	89 (Elis)	The Crawl (Mike)	Football scene from Kes (Elis)	Jonty Rhodes fielding (Steff)	Fever Pitch (Elis), Messi (Steff), Barry John's World of Rugby (Mike)
11	Podding for Pears	Chris Froome at Giro D'Italia (Steff)	Kimbo Slice punches David Blaine (Mike)	Blackpool V Manchester City (Elis)	Cliff (Mike)	Gloucester Cheese Rolling (Mike)	Jimmy Anderson back in the nets (Steff)	Wales goal in a qualifier for the Women's World Cup (Elis)	Raging Bull, My Story (Elis), Shoe Dog (Steff), Mean on Sunday (Mike)
12	Underarmer Karma	Calcio Storico (Steff)	England squad sing 'All the Way' on Wogan (Mike)	Robert Jones fighting with Nick Farr Jones (Elis)	Be Water (Steff)	Wales beat the All Blacks in 1978 (Mike)	Underarm ball (Steff)	Maradona warming up for Napoli (Elis)	A Fighter's Heart (Steff), Rugby Football (Mike), How to Watch Football (Elis)
13	Grandstanding	Snooker Loopy (Mike)	Alan Jones test match debut (Steff)	Grandstand, April 1, 1989 (Elis)	Kevin Allen's World Cup video diary (Elis)	Brazil Airport Advert (Steff)	Zola Budd 'trips' Mary Decker, LA 1984 (Elis)	Danny MacAskill's brilliant bike trickery (Mike)	Danish Dynamite (Steff), Only A Game? (Elis), The Lost Soul of Eamonn Magee (Mike)
14	40 Bags of Pom-Bears	Jurgen Klopp's first press conference (Mike)	Jan Molby's 'Lost Goal' during a 1985 TV strike (Elis)	Ice Hockey sub goalie makes NHL debut at 36 (Steff)	Lyle Alzado (Mike)	Carragher & Neville running (Steff)	NRL tackling (Mike)	17yr old Michael Chang underarm serve, French Open 1989 (Elis)	The Breakaway (Steff), The Topical Times Football Book (Elis), Football Shirts Book (Mike)
15	Half a Family Cheesecake, Two Ribeye Steaks and a Lion Bar	Ali and Frasier on the Dick Cavett Show (Elis)	Brian Shaw and Eddie Hall on diets (Steff)	Wales team celebrating England loss (Mike)	Gati V Ward Legendary Nights (Steff)	JPR (Mike)	Australian Speedskater Gold (Steff)	Manchester Utd 3 Barcelona 0, ECWC 1984 (Elis)	Das Reboot (Elis), The Art of Resilience (Steff), Paper Lion (Mike)
16	Seven Times a Night	Ireland at Italia '90 (Elis)	Roy Jones touching his toes (Steff)	Atherstone ball game (Mike)	Gascoigne (Elis)	Why do Ajax sing Bob Marley's Three Little Birds? (Steff)	Agnew and Johnstone (Mike)	Bert Trautman plays 1956 FA Cup final with broken neck (Elis)	Playground of the Gods (Steff), War, Baby: The Glamour of Violence (Elis), Distant Replay (Mike)
17	Doing a Geldof	George North V Israel Folau (Steff)	10 cent beer night (Mike)	Eddie Hall doing a 500 kg deadlift (Elis)	The Best That Never Was (Mike)	NHL Press Conferences (Mike)	Gary Sobers hits six sixes (Elis)	Real Zaragoza V Ajax 1987 ECWC semi (Steff)	What I Talk About When I Talk About Running (Steff), I am the Secret Footballer (Elis), No Spin - Shane Warne (Mike)
18	Ripped Like a Chimp	Will Carling gets a surprise (Elis)	Tony Bellew on SAS Who Dares Wins (Steff)	Brian Close (Mike)	The Opposition (Steff)	Blyth Spartans reach the 1978 FA Cup fifth round (Elis)	Crossfit fails (Mike)	Geraint Thomas crying after winning the Tour De France (Steff)	Toshack's Way: My Journey Through Football by John Toshack (Elis)
19	On My Mother's Life	Tina Turner Aussie RL Promo (Mike)	Greg Lemond wins the Tour De France after being shot by his brother (Elis)	Larry Merchant and Floyd Mayweather (Steff)	Once in a Lifetime (The Extraordinary Story of The New York Cosmos) (Elis)	Jens Adler's 2 minute international career (Steff)	Hagler V Hearns Round 1 1985 (Elis)	Gary Newbon gets called a c*nt (Mike)	The Greatest Footballer You Never Saw: The Robin Friday Story by Paolo Hewitt & Paul McGuigan (Mike)
20	The FourPiece Bathroom Suite	Scott Jurek talking about his attitude to running (Elis)	Castleford Wigan commentary (Mike)	GB relay team gold in 2004 (Steff)	America's Game Super Bowl I 1966 (Mike)	A collection of Ieuan Evans' tries (Elis)	Millionaire Pitcher who lives in a Van (Steff)	Dana Kunze High Diver (Mike)	The Rider by Tim Krabbé (Steff)
21	Sohcahtoa, Sohcahtoa	Cliff Jones teaching his twitter followers to exercise at the age of 85 (Elis)	Ronnie 147 V Selby shot (Mike)	Donald Trump on Saint & Greavsie (Steff)	The Barkley Marathons: The Race That Eats Its Young (Steff)	11mins of absolute magic from David Campese (Elis)	Nancy Kerrigan and Tonya Harding (Mike)	David Rudisha Gold 2012 (Steff)	The Picador Book of Sports Writing (Elis)
22	The Redemption of Peter Reid	Eric Cantona at his best (Elis)	Sergey Bubka (Mike)	GB Hockey gold medal shoot out 2016 (Steff)	Everton: Howard's Way (Elis)	Superhuman (Mike)	Adam Ondra, The hardest route in the world (Steff)	Jane Couch beating up Michael Barrymore (Elis	Scoop Sports Annual 1982 by D C Thomson (Mike)
23	Love Caldey Island	The Glasgow Diamonds. Best Song Ever (Mike)	The Strange Case of Sonny Pike (Elis)	George Weah solo goal for AC Milan (Steff)	The Marinovich Project (Mike)	Marcelo Bielsa orders his players to concede a goal (Elis)	Northwestern fitness coach (Mike)	Jossy's Giants Theme tune (Steff)	Doctor Socrates: Footballer, Philosopher, Legend by Andrew Downie
24	Getting off with Iain Dowie	Ali Dia (Mike)	Reporter says sex (Steff)	Jimmy Glass (Elis)	Of Miracles and Men (Steff)	Wrigglesworth and Rodgers (Mike)	Colin Jackson wins gold at the World Championships (Elis)	Tony Hawk (Steff)	Soccer and Society in South Wales, 1900–1939 by Martin Johnes
25	A Room With a View	Indoor League (Mike)	The Two Sides of Rene Higuita (Elis)	Kevin Peterson: Switch Hitting (Steff)	Welsh Greats, Carwyn James (Elis)	Terry Butcher bleeding like a pig, 1989 (Elis)	Wales lose to Leyton Orient in 1996 (Steff)	John Charles singing (Mike)	The Rise and Fall of the London Monarchs by Alex Cassidy (Mike)
26	We Cannot Be Serious	John McEnroe You Cannot Be Serious (Elis)	The MCG Brawl, State of Origin, 1995 (Mike)	John Williams wins sprint race (Steff)	The Battered Bastards of Baseball (Mike)	The science of Michael Jordan (Mike)	Luis Suarez Handball (Steff)	Newport beat the All Blacks, 1963 (Elis)	The Chimp Paradox by Dr Steve Peters (Steff)
27	Spielberg: Catch Me If You Can	Lee and Hunter having a scrap, 1975 (Elis)	Leighton Rees winning the world title (Steff)	Gavin Henson (Mike)	Chasing Tyson on ESPN (Steff)	Vets Rugby (Mike)	Swansea City fan scores a goal at Anfield, January 1990 (Elis)	Aussie Rugby League finish (Steff)	Red Dragons: The Story of Welsh Football by Phil Stead (Elis)
28	Mo & Elv	Jack Nicklaus & Gary Player (Mike)	Jeff Cranton's awful tackle (Elis)	Dock Ellis on LCD (Steff)	The 72nd Hole (Losers series) (Elis)	Richard Harris and Peter O’Toole on Rugby (Steff)	Insane Fielding (Mike)	Brian Clough v Muhammad Ali (Elis)	Chasing a Rugby Dream: Book One: Kick Off by David Brayley & James Hook (Mike)
29	Hindu or Hin Don't	Bike Fail (Mike)	Nigel Benn and Chris Eubank signing a contract to fight (Steff)	Keegan and Bremner fight at the 1974 Charity Shield (Mike)	The Band That Wouldn't Die (Mike)	Darts Fart (Mike)	Fiji sand dune training (Steff)	Glenn Hoddle the manager (Elis)	A Lot of Hard Yakka: Triumph and Torment - A County Cricketer's Life: Simon Hughes (Steff)
30	Semen World of Sport	Old School Weight Lifting (Mike)	Jimmy Wilde - Self-Defence (Elis)	Brian O'Driscoll (Steff)	Katie (Steff)	PBR Bull Riding Wrecks 2014 (Mike)	The worst 20 seconds of football of all time! (Elis)	Premier League launch (Steff)	Brian Flynn: Little Wonder (Elis)
31	Remind me of Your Name	Fish and a Rice Cake (Mike)	Retrieving lost balls in a coracle (Elis)	Tommy Lawrence before the Merseyside derby (Steff)	Football's Greatest: Ronaldo (Elis)	Jason McAteer (Steff)	Brian Clough trying to sign Dean Saunders (Elis)	Rossi vs Lorenzo MotoGP 2009 (Mike)	The Mavericks: English Football When Flair Wore Flares (Mike)
32	Sexual Smorgasbord #Sport	Maurice Flitcroft (Mike)	Stuart Pearce Penalty Redemption (Elis)	Troy Deeney goal v Leicester (Steff)	Straight Outta LA (Mike)	Shankly retires, fan reaction (Elis)	Geoffrey Boycott on Pakistan (Mike)	Kabaddi on Transworld Sport (Steff)	Heaven Is a Playground (Steff)
33	If You've Got Something To Say To Me, Say It To My Face	Ally McCoist on Sean Connery (Mike)	Denis Law backheel v Man Utd (Elis)	Iwan Thomas and Jamie Baulch (Steff)	November 16 (Steff)	Schumacher on Battiston (Elis)	Colombian cyclist (Mike)	Stormzy and Anthony Joshua (Steff)	When Saturday Comes: The Half Decent Football Book (Elis)
34	Doing it for Free	Jon Rahm, Hole in One (Mike)	Robbie Fowler goes back to Toxteth (Elis)	Dean Jones on scoring 210 v India in Chenai in 50 degrees (Steff)	Maradona (Elis)	The Alston turn (Steff)	Dean Saunders goal for Sheffiled Utd (Elis)	Bill. 96 and going strong (Mike)	Badasses: The Legend of Snake, Foo, Dr Death and John Madden's Oakland Raiders (Mike)
35	Shunkies	Daredevil, UK style (Mike)	Dick Fosbury changing the high jump forever (Elis)	Nate Ebner NFL/Rugby Player (Steff)	Buffalo Bills, The Missing Rings (Mike)	Planking (Steff)	Fernando Torres missing an open goal against Utd at Old Trafford (Elis)	Argentina training (Mike)	Blood and Circuses (Steff)
36	The Famous Dennis Catering DistantPod	Cliff at Wimbledon 1996 (Mike)	Adebayor (Elis)	Drop goal fun (Steff)	The Way of the Wildcard (Steff)	1981 Rollercycling Championship (Mike)	Spurs players playing cricket (Elis)	What happened to Park Si Hun (Steff)	The Art of Boxing (Elis)
37	Giving Geraint Thomas A Backie	Clive Rowlands on the importance of playing for Wales (Elis)	Tommy Morrissey (Mike)	NFL drop-kick (Steff)	Hero: The Official Film of the 1986 World Cup (Elis)	Rugby League Final highlights (Mike)	Scotland own goal (Steff)	Roy Jones Jr v Mike Tyson (Elis)	How to become a first class Batsman (Mike)
38	Sex And Lions	Graeme Souness plants a Galatasaray flag in the centre circle at Fenerbahce in 1996 (Elis)	O Canada, Las Vegas style (Mike)	Barefoot Kicking (Steff)	Storyville - The Red Penguins (Mike)	Peter Alliss at Steve's house (Mike)	Rivaldo play-acting at the 2002 World Cup (Elis)	Simon Jones bowling in 2005 (Steff)	From The Jaws Of Victory (Steff)
39	I Couldn't Bare To Think Of You Eating Cold Beans	Iceland celebrate after knocking England out of Euro 2016 (Elis)	Newcastle's Bowyer v Dyer in 2005 (Mike)	Andre Agassi on how to beat Boris Becker (Steff)	Wrighty & Rocky, From Brockley to the Big Time (Steff)	NFL's Greatest Characters: Joe Namath (Mike)	Robbie Fowler honesty from 1997 (Steff)	Sunderland fans enjoying themselves at Wigan, 1988 (Elis)	And The Sun Shines Now (Elis)
Highlights	Best of... Part 1								
Highlights	Best of... Part 2								
40	To Feet Terry	Urdd XV (Steff)	The Ice Bowl 1967 (Mike)	San Marino defender cries in a post match interview (Elis)	The Three Kings by Jonny Owen (Elis)	Long ball football (Steff)	Mitchell Johnson Golden Duck (Mike)	Mark E. Smith of The Fall reads the final scores (Elis)	The Dynasty by Jeff Benedict (Mike)
41	I Blame Vic	Aussies in the Snow (Steff)	Gerwyn Price scores a try in the Swalec Cup Final (Mike)	Cardiff City The Movie (Elis)	Shoulder to Shoulder on BT Sport (Mike)	Gerwyn wins the Darts (Steff)	Cricket Redemption (Mike)	Colin Bell tries to recover from injury (Elis)	Gareth: An Autobiography (Steff)
42	Minestrone Soup and Soldiers	Liam Williams responding to Chris Eubank Jr (Mike)	Roy Keane Quiz Night (Steff)	Addiscombe Boys Club 1975 (Elis)	Undefeated (Steff)	Brett Lee v Piers Morgan (Mike)	Motherwell FC fans (Steff)	Derek Chisora compares himself to a laxative (Elis)	Football Clichés by Adam Hurrey (Elis)
43	No Woman, No Cry, Dai	New Detroit Lions Head Coach, Dan Campbell (Mike)	Remember the name, Wayne Rooney! (Elis)	Jose Mourinho at FC Porto	Finding Jack Charlton (Elis)	George Best chatting to Barry John 1972 (Mike)	Leeds United fan goes flying as Chris Fairclough scores against Oxford United, 1988 (Elis)	Dickie Davies says cocksucker (Steff)	Green Bay Packers: The Complete Illustrated History (Mike)
44	Very Blue Danube	Scott Quinnell on SOHK (Mike)	An absolutely extraordinary moment of slapstick at Chester City FC (Elis)	Enzo Maccarinelli inspiring people to work out on Twitter (Steff)	House of Flying Arrows (Steff)	Some seriously hard American football hits (Mike)	Jonathan Pearce commentating on Eric Cantona's kung fu kick at Selhurst Park (Elis)	David Beckham says goodbye (Steff)	The Card: Every Match, Every Mile (Steff)
45	Stealing a Living	Steven Gerrard's slip (Elis)	Buck Shelford. Tough (Mike)	Gerald Cordle, Martin Offiah and Will Carling in action (Steff)	Golazzo: The Football Italia Story (Steff)	Middlesbrough legend Wilf Mannion (Elis)	Sean Taylor in the Pro Bowl. (Mike)	Milner and Klopp (Steff)	Curt: The Alan Curtis Story (Elis)
46	The Referee's a Plonker	Wales v Scotland 1971 (Mike)	Dan James nearly signs for Leeds (Steff)	Wales 3 Belgium 1 October 1990 (Elis)	Inspired to Ride (Elis)	Robot Hole in One (Mike)	Scottish Rugby Players singing Calon Lan. (Steff)	Pembrokeshire's traditional game Cnapan (Elis)	Secret Sins: Sex, Violence and Society in Carmarthenshire 1870-1920 (Mike via Elis)
47	Top Vocal Act from the East	Sky Sports Analysis, 1970s style (Mike)	Train track inside the ground (Steff)	Tom Dumoulin, when you've got to go, you've got to go (Elis)	The Dawn Wall (Mike)	Aerobics. So pointless (Mike)	Willis Halaholo highlights (Steff)	Roger Milla at the 1990 World Cup, at the age of 38 (Elis)	Chasing Dean: Surfing America's Hurricane States (Steff)
48	Paper Pants	Mike Kearney and Stephen Garcia at Anfield (Mike)	Long Jumping Redefined (Steff)	The great Edgar Davids makes his debut for Barnet (Elis)	Free Solo (Steff)	Eric Morecambe commentating on Luton Town vs Bristol City, December 1973 (Mike)	Lake Tahoe hosts NHL (Steff)	Usain Bolt wins 100m gold at the 2008 Olympics (Elis)	The Mixer: The Story of Premier League Tactics, from Route One to False Nines (Elis)
49	Hopeless. Romantic	Bowling (Mike)	Lou Reed after his first cap (Steff)	Llanelli 13 Australia 9 1992 (Elis)	Bruno v Tyson (Elis)	Spurs Ballboy (Mike)	Roberto Carlos Free Kick Science (Steff)	AS Roma fan writes "I could have scored that!" on the club's Facebook page, the club invite him to prove it (Elis)	King of the World: Muhammad Ali and the Rise of an American Hero (Mike)
50	#JusticeforCnut	Katherine Switzer runs the 1967 Boston Marathon (Elis)	Ernestine Shepherd, 80 year old bodybuilder (Mike)	Rose Reilly (Steff)	The Merthyr Mermaid (Mike)	England cricketers (Steff)	Flo Jo, Seoul 1988 (Mike)	Martina Navratilova at Wimbledon (Elis)	Curveball: The Remarkable Story of Toni Stone (Steff)

Episodes 51–100 -
Episode	Title	First Clip	Second Clip	Third Clip	Documentary	Fourth Clip	Fifth Clip	Sixth Clip	Book(s)
51	The Jane & Finch Candle Company	Gareth Bale announces himself to the world against Inter Milan, 2010 (Elis)	Sabine Schmitz on Top Gear (Mike)	Newport County A.F.C. player celebrates in front of former manager (Steff)	One Man and His Shoes (Elis)	Phil Vickery on being dropped as a Lion (Steff)	Tony Sibson on Marvin Hagler (Mike)	Linford Christie wins gold at the 1992 Barcelona Olympics (Elis)	Hard Man Hard Knocks: Terry Yorath (Elis)
52	You've Got Your Piggles, Your Daisies, Your Boos, Your Pakkas	Succulent Chinese Meal (Mike)	Cofio Dai Davies (Elis)	Joe Frazier the singer (Steff)	My Name Is Francesco Totti (Elis)	1960s Men's Gym (Elis)	Frank Worthington tribute (Mike)	Bermuda catch (Steff)	An Illustrated History of Welsh Rugby (Mike)
53	Barry McGuigan	Don't Make Devon Angry (Mike)	Martin Compston watching Scotland win (Steff)	Jonny Williams scores his first goal for his country (Elis)	Ocean's Apart (Mike)	Max Latiff (Mike)	Amy Williams wins Gold in 2010 winter Olympics (Steff)	Fan saves woman from being hit by a baseball (Elis)	The Extraordinary Life of Serena Williams (Steff)
54	British Dessert Tie	Gordon Strachan narrates Arsène Wenger kicking a bottle in disgust (Elis)	Ali v Marciano (Steff)	Real Sociedad manager (Mike)	Mike and The Mad Dog (Steff)	Bale and Rodon (Steff)	Cycling at the 1948 Olympics (Mike)	World record ski jump (Elis)	Inverting the Pyramid: The History of Football Tactics (Elis)
55	David Ginola. The Handsome Bastard	Dougie Smith books Gazza (Mike)	Alex Scott taking the piss out of Jamie Carragher (Elis)	Rachel Atherton, greatest downhill MTB rider (Steff)	Bosman - The Player that Changed Football (Elis)	Alex Murphy 80s RL clip (Mike)	Team America v England - a combined NASL team play v England, Italy and Brazil in 1976 (Steff)	Sarevi playing 7s (Elis)	Race Against Time (Mike)
56	Taking Pyjamas to a Nightclub	The Future of Football 1994 (Mike)	Barcelona 6 PSG 1 (Elis)	The start of E-Sports (Steff)	I Believe In Miracles (Mike)	Danny McAlinden wins British heavyweight title in 1972 (Mike)	NI v England: Best v Banks (Steff)	Duncan Ferguson tells a kid to stop slacking off at school (Elis)	Cassius X, The Transformation of Muhammad Ali (Steff)
57	Shower When Necessary	Non Evans (Mike)	Two adverts, Bobby Moore and Nike (Elis)	Man City 1999 beating Gillingham in the playoffs (Steff)	Casuals: The Story of Legendary Terrace Fashion (Steff)	Kaká turns up to 5 a side in London (Elis)	Storm Warriors NRL (Mike)	James Simpson, Hero (Steff)	AJ Leibling: The Sweet Science (Elis)
58	What Good's That To Me?	Roger Daltrey training (Mike)	Nigel Kennedy trying his best to entertain the England squad at Italia '90 (Elis)	John Lennon on Monday Night Football (Steff)	Whatever Happened to the Knockers? (Elis)	Llanelli Warriors (Mike)	Keith Cooper getting ready to referee the South Wales derby (Elis)	Emlyn Hughes and Princess Anne (Steff)	Death Row All Stars: A Story of Baseball, Corruption, and Murder (Mike)
59	Meet My Family: Rusty, Cheeky, Dirty, Smelly, Complete, Massive & Hard	Karren Brady at Birmingham City, 1993 (Mike)	Alun Evans, Darts (Steff)	Horrific video celebrating Man City's title win (Elis)	Steelers, The World's First Gay Rugby Club (Mike)	Ian McGeechan and The Lions (Mike)	UFC 1 (Steff)	George Best builds a £36k house in Bramhall, Cheshire (Elis)	Goodfella:Craig Bellamy (Elis)
60	"So I Did: The Peter Shilton Story"	Ryan, and Rob, and Maxine (All)	Swindon Town, 1963. (Mike)	Stuart Pearce sticks David James up front (Elis)	Being Evel Knievel (Steff)	Lerrone Richards singing (Steff)	Baseball-94 mph fastball in the face (Mike)	Llanelli v Neath, Schweppes Cup Final 1989 (Elis)	I think therefore I play:Andrea Pirlo (Elis)
61	Laughterhouse-Five	Tumble v Penclawdd, WRU Challenge Cup Final, 1971-72 (Elis)	Harry Redknapp talks up a 17 year old Frank Lampard (Mike)	Tony Bellew dealing with his kids before an interview on Zoom (Steff)	Sherpa (Elis)	Gary Lineker on Parents in Football (Steff)	Al Charron scores for Canada at RWC95 (Mike)	Alan Shearer chicken and beans (Elis)	Gordon's Game: Gordon D'Arcy (Miike)
62	Annwyl Bloke	Jordan Henderson and his Dad (Mike)	Dunfermline Athletic singing the Eastenders theme on Pebble Mill (Elis)	Panenka (Steff)	Another Bloody Sunday (Mike)	Joe Marler interview (Mike)	Liverpool's Kit Man (Steff)	Hearts go for the double in 1985-86 (Elis)	Bunce's Big Fat Short History of British Boxing (Steff)
63	I'm a Bonnie Tyler/Snooker/White Dog Poo/Tommy Cooper SuperFan	State of Origin intro (Mike)	George Best on the frustration of not playing in a World Cup (Elis)	John Barnes recreates World in Motion (Steff)	Elis James: Football Nation (Steff)	Sneaky running x2 (Steff)	Marcus Armitage wins his first European Tour event (Mike)	Ricky Hatton on Floyd Mayweather (Elis)	The Accidental Footballer:Pat Nevin (Elis)
64	Dick and Willy Seaman	S4C Newyddion chats to Wales fans in North Wales (Mike)	Aaron Ramsey goal v England U21 (Elis)	Colin McRae making a rally car dance (Steff)	Different League: The Derry City Story (Elis)	Leeds Rhinos Learning Disability Team (Mike)	Simon Davies for Fulham v Hamburg (Elis)	Kasper Schmeichel (Steff)	A Race with Love and Death (Mike)
65	Absolutely Ingrammed	Piper Down (Mike)	Joe Rodon's "WOSS 'E ON ABOUT?" (Elis)	Las Vegas Raiders defensive end Carl Nassib announces that he is gay (Steff)	Ref: Stories From the Weekend (Mike)	British Umbrella Opening & Closing Champion (Steff)	Alwyn the 85 year old boxing coach (Mike)	Gareth Bale apologising to the team for missing a penalty (Elis)	Stronger:Gareth Thomas (Steff)
66	Outsprinting Mozart	Billericay Town "Shut your eyes!" (Mike)	Fan causes enormous crash at the Tour de France (Elis)	Lauren Price (Steff)	Get Shirty (Steff)	Mark Cavendish winning Stage 3 at the Tour De France (Steff)	Choir practicing at a Porthcawl U12 match (Mike)	All 97 goals John Charles scored in Serie A (Elis)	Keane: The Autobiography by Roy Keane (Elis)
67	Are You Not Looking At My Missus?	Rucking (Elis)	Basketball clip (Mike)	Life of Riley (Goal of the Month Music)	Skid Row Marathon (Elis)	Precious McKenzie (Steff)	Giorgio Chiellini’s shithouse tactics prior to the Italy v Spain penalty shoot out (Elis)	Leatherhead after beating Billericay (Mike)	Legacy of the Lions: Lessons in Leadership from the British & Irish Lions (Mike)
68	Saluting the Urn	Cricket in the rain (Elis)	England fans riot before final (Mike)	England players congratulate Marcus Smith on Lions call up during interview	Mr Calzaghe (Mike)	John Akhwari (Steff)	Tom O'Flaherty try (Mike)	The most legendary voice crack ever (Elis)	Relentless, 12 Rounds to Success by Eddie Hearn (Steff)
69	Cofficionado	Speed Rollerskating 1973 (Mike)	Ireland qualify for Olympic 7s (Steff)	Michael Johnson's reaction at Usain Bolt's 9.58 (Elis)	Strike Team (Steff)	Geoff Capes (Mike)	Bobby Robson's words to Gazza after losing to Germany at Italia '90 (Elis)	1991 Carl Lewis v Mike Powell (Steff)	Forever Young: The Story of Adrian Doherty, Football's Lost Genius (Elis)
70	Failed P.E. Teacher I Am	Adult tries to steal signed basketball shoes that have been given to a kid (Elis)	Two Way MLB player (Steff)	Birmingham Grand Prix 1971 (Mike)	Slaying the Badger (Elis)	Six and an Oh... (Mike)	James Bond and the Queen - London 2012 (Steff)	Are athletes getting faster? (Elis)	No Helmets Required: The Remarkable Story of the American All Stars (Mike)
71	A Million Bees	Insane robot dance (Elis)	Luke Treharne on not making the Olympics (Steff)	Cleveland Guardians (Mike)	Forty Seven Summits (Mike)	Best ever Sunday League tackles (Elis)	Andy Murray calls out sexism (Steff)	Cyclist gets bike from crowd (Mike)	You Are a Champion: How to Be the Best You Can Be (Steff)
72	Michael Owen's Movie Club: Field of Dreams	Michael Owen's Movie Club special episode							
73	This Is Our Live Aid	Messi and Neymar (Steff)	Carting With Ronnie Corbett (Mike)	Ruby Tui interview (Elis)	20 Seconds of Joy (Steff)	Chase Tag (Steff)	High jump double Gold (Mike)	Brian McClair's penalty miss, Arsenal v Man Utd 1988 (Elis)	Etape by Richard Moore (Elis)
74	I Am The Catman	Roy Keane on Ronaldo going back to Man Utd (Elis)	Team GB wheelchair rugby (Mike)	Olympic Cheat (Steff)	Malice at the Palace (Elis)	Imran Tahir hat trick (Mike)	Wales v Lions rugby (Steff)	Cathy Freeman wins gold at the 400m Sydney Olympics (Elis)	Motorcycles by Charles E Dean (Mike)
75	Gangsters Can Be Good Dads Too	Turbo Tommy try in the NRL (Mike)	Stuart Pearce in the new Stranglers video (Elis)	Brian Johnson on a rollercoaster (Steff)	Untold: Crime and Penalties (Mike)	College Football returns (Mike)	Cardiff Met goal v Swansea City (Steff)	France preparing to face Ronaldo, 1998 WC Final (Elis)	Too Many Reasons to Live by Rob Burrow (Steff)
76	Hackney Empire (a) 1st Leg (live show special)	Paul "Thornburn" kicking for the Rams at Wembley in 1987 (Steff)	Jimmy Greaves talking about poor weather forecasting prior to the Hurricane of 1987 (Elis)	Paralympic Table Tennis (Mike)					
77	Hackney Empire (a) 2nd Leg (live show special)	Demba Ba reveals the secret to his success (Elis)	Jasmine Joyce tackle for GB Women's Sevens (Steff)	Village Cricket (Mike)		Jimmy Greaves and his dog (Elis)			
78	Salford: The Lowry (a) (live show special)	Ipswich Town goal against Sheffield Wednesday (Listener clip)	Tyson Fury's come back to Deontay Wilder (Mike)	Phil and Gary Neville ignore each other for ages (Steff)		Mario Balotelli messes up a trick shot (Elis)			
79	The New Theatre, Cardiff (h) 1st Leg (live show special)	BBC Wales press box, 2015 Rugby World Cup (Mike)	Clive Sullivan v George Best v Geoff Capes (Steff)	Cardiff City goal (Elis)		Buffon, Paper, Scissors, Stone (Listener clip)			
80	The New Theatre, Cardiff (h) 2nd Leg (live show special)	Ray French on Billy Boston (Mike)	Dai and his goal celebrations (Steff)	Neil Warnock (Elis)		Jose (Elis)	Angharad James goal (Listener clip)		
81	The New Theatre, Cardiff (h) 3rd Leg (live show special)	That Barbarians Try 1973 (Mike)	Newport County fan (Steff)	Malcolm Allen commentary skills (Elis)		Sorba Thomas first cap (Mike)	Kimbo Slice (Listener clip)		
82	Tyne Theatre & Opera House, Newcastle (a) (live show special)	Geordie Boys, Gazza, TOTP (Mike)	Peter Beardsley - World in Motion (Steff)	Newcastle fans (Elis)		Worst goal ever (Elis)	Newcastle fan at the Stadium of Light (Elis)		
83	The EICC, Edinburgh (a) (live show special)	Scotland cricket players singing (Steff)	Wales v Scotland Rugby on BBC Wales (Mike)	Yes Sir, I Can Boogie (Mike)		Scotland players after qualifying for Euro 2020 (Steff)	Allan Wells 1982 Commonwealth Games (Elis)	Graeme Souness tackle	
84	The Alexandra Theatre, Birmingham (a) (live show special)	Chinos (Steff)	Steward scores with a dildo (Mike)	Geraint Jones catch 2005 Ashes 2nd Test (Steff)		Commonwealth Games advert (Steff)	The Bullring shopping centre (Elis)		
85	The Ulster Hall, Belfast (a) (live show special)	Rory McIlroy at the Ryder Cup	James Nesbitt drunk at the Carl Frampton fight (Steff)	Football in the snow (Mike)		The Shamen (Elis)	Dana and 1982 Northern Ireland squad (Listener clip)		
86	Bitten By A Radioactive Sandy Lyle	Wimbledon v Manchester United, FA Cup 1994 (Elis)	Fallon Sherrock 170 finish (Mike)	Joe Ledley Dancing (Steff)	Long Shot - Netflix (Steff)	Footballers missing follow-up shots (Elis)	First cap (Mike)	Best referee (Steff)	Full Gas by Peter Cossins (Elis)
87	Harry Potter and the Goblet of Puke	Jordan Mailata (Steff)	Seve at The 1979 Open (Mike)	Dai Bishop interview (Elis)	Too Good To Go Down (Elis)	Kevin Sinfield run (Steff)	The Perfect Spiral (Mike)	Behind the scenes at Anfield (Elis)	Cardiff Schools Rugby 2019-2020 (Mike)
88	You Trample The Dead... You Hurdle The Weak...	Rugby Header (Mike)	Carwyn James singing in Russian (Elis)	Carl Frampton eats a Mince Pie for the first time (Steff)	As Good As It Gets on Prime Video (Mike)	Caerau Ely RFC (Mike)	Ice Hockey in Scotland in the 60s (Steff)	Thiago and Rodri warming up (Elis)	No Hunger in Paradise by Michael Calvin (Steff)
89	The Cat Will Think It's a Worm And Try To Eat It	Steven Page & Ryan Reynolds (Mike)	Keane and Carr (Elis)	Newport High School try (Steff)	Flight Mode by Tom Pages (Steff)	The San Diego Splash (Mike)	Storm in Kerry (Steff)	Steve Ford (Elis)	Geronimo! Riding the very terrible 1914 Tour of Italy by Tim Moore (Elis)
90	From Russia with Bubbs	Frank Rijkaard spits at Rudi Voller, Italia '90 (Elis)	Welsh Bobsleigh (Steff)	Billy Vunipola 20m march (Mike)	Trent's Vision (Elis)	David Michael Clough (Mike)	Welsh Football Revolution (Steff)	The best of Steve Bull (Elis)	Steve Fenwick: Dragons and Lions (Mike)
91	Bilbo Bubbins	Yellow Pages ad with Taylor and Robson (Elis)	Matchbox Rugby (Steff)	Sam Kerr vs Wa**er (Mike)	Faster, on Prime Video (Mike)	Robbie Savage on Charlie Savage (Mike)	Rock, Paper, Scissors for ice hockey stick (Steff)	David Ellery refereeing with a mic (Elis)	It's Always Summer Somewhere: A Matter of Life and Cricket by Felix White (Steff)
92	The Gold Blenders	Brian Moore "Oh my Goodness" (Elis)	Jones Boys beating USA (Steff)	Cliff Davies Diving (Mike)	The Kings on Discovery+ (Steff)	Clydebank FC (Mike)	Efe Obada story (Steff)	Klaus Fischer demonstrating a bicycle kick in the studio at the age of 66 (Elis)	Above Head Height: A Five-A-Side Life by James Brown (Elis)
93	Carry On Up The Butts	Wayne Mardle "Why wasn't I told?" (Mike)	Jogging (Steff)	Two of the best disallowed goals ever, both by Andy Carroll (Elis)	14 Peaks on Netflix (Elis)	Mike Rayer and Ieuan Evans scoring tries in the mud, Wales v Scotland 1994 (Elis)	Mark Williams eight balls his son (Mike)	Son waves at kid (Steff)	Mickey Thomas - Kick-ups, Hiccups, Lock-ups (Mike)
94	Grubs and Slobs	Swansea in the 1990s (Elis)	Clara Hughes - medalist at Summer and Winter Olympics (Steff)	John Higgins and Mark Williams, then and now. (Mike)	"Everybody's Game", on Prime Video (Mike)	Max Rushden talking about Cambridge Utd in the FA Cup (Elis)	Scott Boland's Ashes 6 for 7 (Mike)	Pat Cummins and Usman Khawaja (Mike)	All American Murder by James Patterson (Steff)
95	A Black Cowboy Shirt With White Pearl Buttons And A Red Paisley Yoke. With A Bootlace Tie With A Big Eagle On It	Holder of the Year (Mike)	Richard Hibbard retires from rugby (Steff)	Graham Stack hitting a fan (Elis)	The Other Dream Team (Steff)	Tim Rosaforte's Righteous Pint (Mike)	Harry Redknapp gets kissed by pitch invaders (Elis)	British Skier FINALLY wins a World Cup Race (Steff)	The Unstoppable Rise of Women's Sport by Sue Anstiss (Elis)
96	Any Blood In Your Semen?	Jack Nicklaus. The Master (Mike)	Sepak Takraw (Steff)	What Pep has learnt from rugby (Elis)	Robbo on Prime Video (Elis)	Matthew Stafford, 2009 (Mike)	McEnroe v spectator (Elis)	Ten Pin Bowling arrives in the UK (Steff)	Wales international comes out of retirement at 53 to play in same team as his son (Mike's 'not a book' choice)
97	I'd Rather Be A Eunuch	Adrian Clifton, Boreham Wood FC (Mike)	Swiss Shot Putter, World Champion Werner Gunthor in training (Steff)	How Alex Ferguson tactically adapted at Manchester United (Elis)	The Trails of Muhammad Ali on Prime Video (Mike)	Bill Murray golfing (Mike)	Athlete Jake Smith buys footballs for kids in Uganda (Steff)	Gareth Edwards try v Scotland 1972 (Elis)	Alun Yr Arth (Steff), (Elis' Extra Book Choice: Language Death by David Crystal)
98	You're Sitting On My Catheter	Scotland at the 1986 World Cup (Elis)	Bobby Jones Golf Lesson 1933 (Mike)	Lindsey Jacobellis wins gold (Steff)	Home Game - Pehlwani on Netflix (Steff)	Bobby Robson finds out Ron Saunders has resigned from his job at manager of Aston Villa (Elis)	Ieuan and Shane talk Bill McLaren (Mike)	Super Bowl Half-Time Show (Steff)	The Homes of Football: Where The Heart Is by Stuart Roy Clarke (Elis)
99	Tell Me About Cantre'r Gwaelod Again Richard	Richard Burton and Liz Taylor in Cardiff for the rugby (Elis)	Jimmy Watkins and Running Punks (Steff)	Llewelyn Williams, Surfer (Mike)	Max meets the Dallas Cowboys (Elis)	THE tackle (Mike)	Wales 2 England 1 1955 (Elis)	Tomos, 11 years old. Loves Rugby, Sausage and Chips (Steff)	An Illustrated History of Welsh Rugby (again) by James Stafford (Mike)
100	The Dick, Kerr Ladies Social Media Department (International Women's Day special)	Dick, Kerr Ladies and Lily Parr (Elis)	Ms Fitz the baller (Mike)	Botille Vette-Welsh has arrived (Steff)	Venus and Serena on Amazon Prime (Mike)	The latest Tuipulotu (Steff)	Great pass by Vivianne Miedema (Elis)	Beth Tweddle Floor Gold 2009 World Championships (Mike)	Out and Back: A Runner's Story of Survival Against All Odds by Hillary Allen (Steff)

Episodes 101–150 -
Episode	Title	First Clip	Second Clip	Third Clip	Documentary	Fourth Clip	Fifth Clip	Sixth Clip	Book(s)
101	"Bowling Warnie" (Shane Warne Special)	Warne reading a batsman's mind (Elis)	Shane Warne to Ricky Ponting, Ian Healy keeping (Mike)	Fan angry at Warne out for 99 (Steff)	Shane on Amazon Prime	Shane Warne spin bowling masterclass (Elis)	Shane Warne's Top 5 Wickets (Mike)	Warne playing AFL (Steff)	On Warne by Gideon Haigh (Steff)
102	"Listen To You With Your Chilean Merlot"	Two Kevin Keegan clips (Elis)	Menna Fitzpatrick (Steff)	Liam Livingstone. Double ouch. (Mike)	The Story of The Kop	NFL Players playing with their idols (Mike)	Tadhg Furlong sidestep (Elis)	Mark Wood (Steff)	Collision Low Crossers: A Year Inside The Turbulent World of NFL Football by Nicholas Dawidoff (Mike)
103	There Are More Deer In This Country Than There Were In The Days Of King Henry VIII. Fact.	Bulging Disk (Steff)	Super Rugby red cards (Mike)	Man who identifies obscure sporting events in TV and movies (Elis)	Beefy	Flintoff singing (Steff)	Football before the backpass rule (Elis)	Capuozzo and Adams (Mike)	Looking for a Fight by David Matthews (Steff)
104	A Really Sharp Hat	Dafydd Iwan singing Yma o Hyd, Wales v Austria (Elis)	NHL Ref tells Haydn Fleury to fuck off (Mike)	Goalkeepers Hoofing it (Steff)	Spirit Game: Pride of a Nation	Frost Clough (Mike)	Moustapha Cissé (Steff)	Let's pretend we scored a goal (Elis)	Resilience by Elise Christie (Steff)
105	End Of The Road	John Noakes (Mike)	Jeff Wilson (Steff)	Louis Van Gaal referring to QPR as Queen's Park Raisins (Elis)	Lost in the Desert on Netflix	Refugee find out is he eligible to enroll for his local team (Elis)	RG Snyman (Mike)	Tiddleywinks (Steff)	A Delicate Game, by Hana Walker-Brown (Mike)
106	Feeding The Rabbits	Doncaster Rovers 'Shot of the Month' (Elis)	Qatar and FIFA (Mike)	Wales C beating England C (Steff)	Netflix Losers 'Black Jack	The Art of the Chop Tackle (Mike)	Gary Lineker on playing for Barca (Elis)	Barcelona v Real Madrid, Women's Champions League Quarter Final (Steff)	The Perfect Distance: Coe and Ovett by Pat Butcher (Steff)
107	Sugar Cubes And Chill	Duncan Ferguson remix (Elis)	First Ball of the Season (Steff)	Forgeside RFC game winning conversion by Connor Griffiths tighthead prop (Mike)	Norton's Coin	Kick it off! (Steff)	Surfing, bloody hell (Elis)	Mark Williams back to back 147s (Mike)	Fat City by Leonard Gardner (Elis)
108	You Throw Like A 120 Year Old Man	Adam Rickitt 100m and The Big Race, 2045(Mike)	Katie Taylor v Amanda Serrano (Elis)	East Germany beating West Germany (Steff)	Legends of Welsh Sport: John Dawes	Dad at the Reds game (Mike)	Joe Rodon and Ben Davies visit Ryley Keys (Elis)	Luton Town winning the League Cup (Steff)	The Wit of Cricket by Barry Johnston (Mike)
109	It's A Lot Smaller, But A Lot Harder	Michael Barrymore and Freddie Starr utter dross at Wembley (Mike)	Rangers fan on the news (Elis)	Ugo's Drop Goal (Steff)	Game Changers on Netflix	AFL press conference (Mike)	Man City are relegated (Elis)	How to make a cricket bat and ball in 1949 (Steff)	We Go Again by Tim Cooper (Steff)
110	I Came, I Saw, I Coasted	Argentinian commentator who sings about goals (Elis)	Saint and Greavsie (Mike)	How Michael and Bruce Buffer found out they were brothers (Steff)	Audible on Netflix	Real Madrid fans trying to get back in (Mike)	Canada qualifies for the FIFA World Cup (Steff)	Liverpool and Chelsea fans after the FA Cup Final (Elis)	Where The Cool Kids Hung Out by Steven Scragg (Elis)
111	You Don't Look At The Tele When You're Texting	Blackpool's Jake Daniels (Elis)	7s Shithousery (Mike)	GB captain Jonathan Phillips pre-match instructions (Steff)	Tosh	Jack Grealish (Steff)	#50 for World Leader (Mike)	1990/91 Club Videos (Elis)	The Lost World Of Football by Derek Hammond (Mike)
112	Weather Guessers	Evel Knievel UK style (Eddie Kidd) (Mike)	Gambling, the start (Steff)	Unseen limbs: Man Utd win the treble at the Nou Camp, Man Utd 2 Bayern Munich 1, 1999 (Elis)	The Jaws of Victory on Netflix	Motivation, 1980s Rugby League style (Mike)	BBC News say Manchester United are Rubbish (Steff)	How Football Positions Are Evolving (Elis)	Playing to Win by Michael Lewis (Steff)
113	I Know It's Only Bits	Joe Cordina wins World Title) (Steff)	Ethan Ampadu leads the singing (Mike)	Rob Page (Elis)	Croatia, Defining a Nation	Pride Month/Wales Women's Team (Steff)	Young Isla gets a place in the Aston Villa Academy (Mike)	The Three Dutchmen at AC Milan (Elis)	How a Welshman won the Tour De France by Phil Stead (Elis/Steff)
114	I'm Gonna Be In Trouble Now For Losing A Card (Phil Bennett Tribute Special)	Eddie Butler on Phil. Beautiful. (Mike)	Bennett on 'that try' (Elis)	From Phil's 70th Birthday (Steff)	We Beat The All Blacks	Phil Bennett BBC Wales (Mike)	ITV tribute to Phil (Elis)	Phil Bennett tells the speech story (Steff)	Phil Bennett: The Autobiography by Phil Bennett and Graham Thomas
115	You're On Drugs, Old Man	American comic Orny Adams on Rugby Union (Mike)	Russian slapping (Elis)	Roger Federer fan shows Roger his tattoo of Roger (Steff)	Stone Cold	Seve being Seve (Mike)	Oldest footage of Baseball outside of USA (Steff)	Ronaldo turns up for a game of five a side (Elis)	Eagle Sports Annual 4: 1954
116	Tim, I'm Leaving The Charlatans To Join the Beatles	Best saves at the Euros (Steff)	Jess Fishlock (Elis)	Scotland v England (Mike)	The Future of Women's Football	BBC Sport Trailer (Mike)	Iceland captain (Steff)	Marie-Antoinette Katoto (Elis)	The Rise, Fall and Rise Again of Women's Football by Suzy Wrack
117	Use Your Probes On Newbon	Remarkable baseball kid (Mike)	John Aldridge v Mexico in 1994 World Cup (Steff)	Amazing bit of volleyball (Elis)	Losers The Miscast Champion on Netflix	Football kits (Elis)	Filbert Bayi smashes the 1500m world record (Steff)	Ian Wright on Alan Sugar (Mike)	The Uncomfortable Truth About Racism by John Barnes
118	Wooing A Woman Made Of Flowers	Elvis playing football (Mike)	Pre-match huddle, Lions 1997 (Elis)	Geoff Thompson Karate (Steff)	Legends of Welsh Sport: Alan "The Arrow" Evans	Ice Rugby (Mike)	Tier 2 rugby teams scoring crackers (Steff)	Rugby League limbs (Elis)	My Turn: The Autobiography by Johan Cruyff
119	His and Hers Matching Porn Rooms	The Simpsons on football (Elis)	Detroit Lions do BVs on What's Going On (Steff)	Justin Harrison's Silver Medal (Mike)	LEADMAN: The Dave Mackey Story	Eden Hazard. Unbelievable (Mike)	Jamie Carragher and Roy Keane - Agree to Disagree (Elis)	Player Cam (Steff)	The Bleus Brothers by Mike Pearce
120	That's Earnie From The Two Ronnies	Bale's first touch in MLS (Elis)	Shelly-Ann Fraser-Pryce (Steff)	Bumble and Nasser Umpiring (Mike)	Daily Euros: All About Van Basten	Kohli v Anderson battle of words (Elis)	CBS NFL Today, 1977 (Mike)	Lloyd Lewis (Steff)	Breakfast Club Adventures: The Beast Beyond The Fence by Marcus Rashford & Alex Falase-Koya
121	Trust Your Body	David Ginola (Elis)	Coolest catch ever (Steff)	Fred's not bitter (Mike)	The Real Mo Farah	Gary Lineker on training (Elis)	Smooth Baseball slide (Steff)	Jake Wightmans Dad	Two Brothers by Jonathan Wilson
122	Smooth, Like A Fruit Bowl From Habitat	Iwan Thomas gets Commonwealth Games crowd to sing Happy Birthday to Cindy Sember (Steff)	Jordan Spieth and Michael Greller (Mike)	Tuchel and Conte acting like twats (Elis)	The Lost Final by Pat Nevin	Poser (Steff)	YNWA AC Milan vs Real Madrid (Mike)	5 a side rebound (Elis)	Slipless in Settle by Harry Pearson
123	The Party Line	Castleford v St Helens, 2002. Mick Morgan reading out the teams (Elis)	Gaelic football handshake (Mike)	Dina Asher Smith on Periods (Steff)	The Figo Affair: The Transfer That Changed Football	Leon Edwards UFC Title win (Steff)	Carl Leaburn is given a telly (Elis)	Mondo Duplantis 10-year journey (Mike)	Tokyo Junkie by Robert Whiting
124	Shakespeare At The Castle, What A Farce	Penrith Panthers (Mike)	School in the morning (Steff)	Smelling like a dishwasher (Elis)	Soccer 99ers	Savannah Marshall and Claressa Shields (Steff)	Richarlison (Elis)	Road bowling 1997 (Mike)	Endure: Mind, Body and the Curiously Elastic Limits of Human Performance by Alex Hutchinson
125	Twelve Pint Mike	Steve Davis, snookerstar DJ (Elis)	Siarad Cymraeg (Mike)	10 Siblings! (Steff)	The Toughest Trade	Lad from Bridgend plays NCAA football (Steff)	Tom Brady hole in one (Mike)	Eric Cantona: Philosopher (Elis)	The Nearly Men by Aidan Williams
126	You'd Think I Was Trying To Decipher The Rosetta Stone	Boca fans (Elis)	Eddie Butler Voice Over (Steff)	Bobby Knight on bunkers (Mike)	Rulon	Gaelic Football ending (Elis)	Defibrillator (Steff)	Klopp on Todd Boehly and The Worst Idea Ever (Elis)	Dickie Bird Autobiography by Dickie Bird
127	If You Put A Gun To My Head I'd Have To Say Caravaggio	Mary Peters and Heide Rosendahl (Mike)	Phil Bennett at 41 (Elis)	Sir Viv (Steff)	Elway to Marino on Disney+	Kammy (Steff)	Scottish jackpot (Elis)	Peter Wright tipsy at the Darts	The Blizzard Quarterly
128	You Ruin All Of This Goodwill In Two And A Half Years Time With One Truly Horrific Tweet	Mark Noble's Neighbour calls him a horrible little bastard (Steff)	Geelong Cats win AFL (Mike)	Brian Williams tribute (Elis)	Deion's Double Play on Disney+	Faces of the terraces (Elis)	Mankading for the win (Mike)	Singing Policeman at Arsenal	In The Heat of the Midday Sun by Steven Scragg
129	Thank God For Roy Keane (Eddie Butler tribute episode)	"Oh England what have you done. Wales…what are you doing?" (Elis)	Eddie Butler & Jonathan Davies very upset with the attitude of the Brive players (Steff)	NFL Show (Mike)	The Valleys Fighter	Golf, The Open (Steff)	Eddie's tribute to Phil Bennett (Elis)	2012 Olympic Montage - Full Clip (Mike)	The Head Of Gonzo Davies by Eddie Butler
130	Or I Could Just Drive You	Javeno McLean (Mike)	Jess Fishlock being Jess Fishlock (Steff)	Unintentional chip (Elis)	Obree	Bundee Aki hit (Mike)	Bottle-man helps world record (Steff)	Bobby Charlton training with Manchester United team at 60 (Elis)	Blood on The Crossbar by Rhys Richards
131	When The Pears Are Nice, Eat All Of Them	Tony Adams and Katya Jones on Strictly (Mike)	Bob Mortimer and Sean Hughes watch Middlesbrough v Crystal Palace, 1994 (Elis)	Swimming lessons in Ireland, 1971 (Steff)	This Was The XFL	Erling Haaland (Elis)	School reception for junior boxer (Mike)	RIP Robbie Coltrane (Steff)	Expected Goals by Rory Smith
132	Shouting Up The Chimney	Diego rounding up stadium Workers at The Maracanã (Steff)	Football in the street (Mike)	Jamaica score a try in the RLWC (Elis)	Human Playground on Netflix: The Big Business Episode	Danny Cipriani (Steff)	Greavsie and Tyson (Mike)	John Devereaux hand off (Elis)	Max Baer and Barney Ross: Jewish Heroes of Boxing by Jeffrey Sussman
133	A Sponge on a Stick	Ronnie Lawson shouting (Mike)	Ruud Van Nistelrooy on Italian defences (Elis)	Rio Mitcham 400m runner and musician (Steff)	Clive Sullivan:Rugby League Legend	Tom Dempsey (Mike)	Match of the Day 1974 (Steff)	Sending off, Scottish style (Elis)	When Two Worlds Collide: The InterContinental Cup Years by Daniel Williamson
134	He Knows Exactly Where His Life Jacket Is	Rob Page meets Cliff Jones (Elis)	Toronto Maple Leafs StickMan (Steff)	Jack Grealish meets Finlay (Mike)	Women of Steel	Adam Hills playing at the World Cup (Steff)	The best baseball argument ever (Mike)	Paul Moulden (Elis)	The Tour According to G by Geraint Thomas
135	Berry Gordy Snaps Your ACL	Great Sneaky Goal (Steff)	Paul Thorburn kick (Elis)	"Best Clip Ever" (Mike)	There's Only One Joey Allen	Cracking Throw-Ins (Steff)	Hatton's ring walk (Elis)	Joe's first Wales game (Mike)	World In Their Hands by Sarah Hunter and Martyn Thomas
136	Who Are We Not Telling? The Tax Man	We're all the same (Steff)	Rainbow Bucket Hats (Mike)	Neco Williams (Elis)	Unknown Runner on Netflix	Allan Border to his own player (Mike)	GAA skills (Steff)	Ireland at Italia 90 as told by BBC Three (Elis)	Penguins Stopped Play by Harry Thompson
137	A Great Idea And A Big Sack Of Cash	Rob Burrow (Mike)	Bristol Bears Women names on shirts (Steff)	Cardiff schoolgirl reacts to Wales v Iran (Elis)	Matthews	Cardiff Schools Rugby (Mike)	Steffi Graf being very funny (Steff)	Pitch invasion, 1970s style (Elis)	Against All Odds: The Greatest World Cup Upsets
138	I'll Be A Tooled Up Vegan Burglar On Mondays	Barry Davies telling off Italy (Elis)	Jack Leach (Steff)	Doddie (Mike)	Living With The Lions	Judith Hann dismisses the science behind frisbee (Elis)	Good Stoke Fan (Steff)	Rooney being a dick (Mike)	All Shapes and Zebras
139	You're Going To Actual Hell	Bobby Robson, 1990 (Elis)	The Art of Persuasion (Mike)	Revels (Steff)	How to Win The World Cup	RTÉ Clip about Niall Quinn (Mike)	World Upside-down Beer Drinking Champion (Steff)	Roy Keane scores for ITV versus BBC (Mike)	Masters Of Modern Soccer by Grant Wahl
140	$illy	Coaching chat (Elis)	Solenne Piret (Mike)	Barmy Army play Ghost Town for Terry Hall (Steff)	Wild Waters	England v Wales 1990 (Elis)	"You should still be F-ing playing!" (Steff)	Scottish commentary on the 1966 World Cup Final (Mike)	There's Only Two Tony Cotteys by David Brayley
141	Little Tommy Two Kormas	Terry Venables forgets the lid is on (Steff)	Saint and Greavsie football gaffs (Elis)	Ironman (Mike)	Heathens	Brian Clough advertises Oribis stickers (Elis)	Finnish Baseball (Steff)	Jeremy Reaves makes the Pro Bowl (Mike)	How to Win the World Cup by Chris Evans
142	Oh! Rich, Mun	Mike Bubbins, Green Bay Packers super fan (Mike)	Dog stops play (Steff)	Pelé on Blue Peter (Elis)	1970 FIFA World Cup film	Frank Lampard gets his own back (Elis)	Lovely NFL player (Steff)	Alexis Mac Allister arrives back in Brighton (Mike)	Becoming Kareem by Kareem Abdul-Jabbar
143	Milk Pod, Gloop Episode	Batman and The Joker compete in a surfing competition (Steff)	The Darts. THAT Leg (Mike)	Battle of The Gnoll (Elis)	30 for 30 Podcast The Six Who Sat	Graeme Souness on Gianluca (Mike)	George Blanda (Steff)	5-a-side (Elis)	Never Stop Dreaming by Stuart Pearce
144	I Was Briefly In The Freemasons	Bike race on a 3,400m-high glacier. (Steff)	Here's to Lancashire, 1933 FA Cup final toast (Mike)	Shadow play at Newcastle United (Elis)	Franco Harris: A Football Life	Somersault Touchdown (Mike)	Seamus Power takes on the one-club challenge at the iconic 18th hole at Kapalua(Steff)	The greatest crowd noise ever (Elis)	Ivor Allchurch MBE by Peter Stead
145	I'm Buying Sudocrem In Commercial Quantities	Scott Quinnell POSTCODE LOTTERY!! (Steff)	Andy Murray (Elis)	Ferret-legging (Mike)	Legends of Welsh Sport: Neville Southall	Mark Hudson getting, and losing, the Cardiff City job. Oof. (Mike)	This may just be the greatest TikTok ever uploaded (Steff)	Erik ten Hag arguing with Johan Cruyff age 13 (Elis)	The Art of War by Sun Tzu
146	Too Many Cooks Make Good Broth	Colin Cummings Air Hockey World Champion (Steff)	Boxer fails to fight his way out of a paper bag (Elis)	Cheerleading (Mike)	Breaking Through	1990 London Division vs Northern Division. (Steff)	Judith Chalmers tour of Wembley, 1980 (Elis)	Gary Player and the experts (Mike)	Superstars of Autumn by Jack Clary
147	Cwtchella	Portia Woodman-Wickliffe (Steff)	Bill McLaren (Elis)	Sheffield Wednesday ballboy (Mike)	Codebreaker	"Wild" Swimming 1972 style (Steff)	USA Rugby League (Mike)	Frank Rothwell, the most Northern man ever (Elis)	Play Forever by Dr Kevin Stone
148	TODGERS (Live episode special)	TV soaps continually getting sport wrong (Elis)	NFL Ringo (Mike)	Alex Ferguson being scared of a balloon (Elis)		East v West (Steff)	WRC Finland (Mike)	Fan isn't happy (Elis)	
149	Carriages of Justice (Live Episode Special)	Leeds United's new signing Weston McKennie admits that espresso makes him shit himself (Elis)	Aussie rules team talk. More is less (Mike)	Toddler fouling (Steff)		Matt Williams Texas Tech Story (Steff)	Dickie Davies (Mike)	Motty's 5 Best moments (Elis)	
150	Best Of Distant Pod July 2022 - March 2023	A selection of the best clips from recent episodes to celebrate the 150th episode							

Episodes 151–200 -
Episode	Title	First Clip	Second Clip	Third Clip	Documentary	Fourth Clip	Fifth Clip	Sixth Clip	Book(s)
151	Box Kicks To Nowhere	Duncan Ferguson on not playing for Scotland (Elis)	Hazal Nehir (Steff)	Morecambe and Wise and Hunt (Mike)	De Ronde 100	Jordan Conroy sliding (Steff)	Mark Hughes top 10 goals (Elis)	BOD and Jamie explain centre play (Mike)	Mortimer & Whitehouse: Gone Fishing - Audiobook version (Steff)
152	A Circle Thank	Crazy cycling descent (Elis)	Lou Macari. Just brilliant. (Mike)	Micah Richards barber (Steff)	Ovett	Jordan Pickford and his biggest fan (Elis)	Stringing a racket (Steff)	Cory Allen interviewing Mason Grady (Mike)	Fibber in the Heat by Miles Jupp (Mike)
153	I Will Make An Absolute Star Out Of That Cow There	Ken Owens (Elis)	Stuart Broad v Neville and Carragher (Steff)	Canucks clip (Mike)	Le Mans 100 Years of Passion, on YouTube	Newcastle United penalty (Elis)	The Jann Mardenborough Story (Steff)	Canada half time RWC 87 (Mike)	How I Won the Yellow Jumper: Dispatches from the Tour de France by Ned Boulting (Elis)
154	*Doubles	Richard Burton narrates match day 1980 (Steff)	It counts because it namechecks Tessa Sanderson and Victor Ubogu. The funniest video I have seen for years (Elis)	Ken Sema post match clip (Mike)	BreakPoint on Netflix episode 1: The Maverick about Nick Kyrgios	Scary Snowboarding (Steff)	Aaron Ramsey on Wales captaincy (Elis)	Vinnie Jones on Gladiators (Mike)	More Fuel You by Renee McGregor (Steff)
155	Some Of My Best Friends Are Trees	Coal Carrying in the 1970s (Steff)	Tiger and Cub (Mike)	Frank Bough singing The Sporting Event of the Year (Elis)	Good Sport, Something in the Water	World Baseball Classic finally takes off (Steff)	Roy Keane on Alex Ferguson (Mike)	Nathan Broaaadheeeeeaaad! (Elis)	Longy by Sean Long (Mike)
156	Most Of The Stones Left Unturned	Skateboarding Duck (Steff)	Ian Holloway talks about his deaf daughter (Mike)	Sheffield United fan finally snaps (Elis)	Glenn Webbe Legends of Welsh Sport	They Haven't Seen Me (Steff)	No arms golfer (Mike)	Clive Thomas being booed (Elis)	Second Yellow by John Smith
157	Sam Warburton (Guest Special)	Jonny Wilkinson's drop goal (Sam)	Michael Owen goal v Germany 2001 (Sam)	QRL Under 7s (Mike)	No documentary	Lennox Lewis beating Mike Tyson (Sam)	Charlie Faulkner try v Ireland (Elis)		No book
158	Making a Porno, Is It?	Wales Under 17s qualify for the Euros for the first time (Elis)	Wrecsam going up (Mike)	Canal jumping (Steff)	Another Sunday in Hell	Niall Quinn in goals (Elis)	Basketball comeback (Mike)	No boots (Steff)	A Runners High by Dean Karnazes
159	I Would Prefer to Have My Left Wrist Broken By Two Men in Hoods With a Bat	Chris Sutton (Steff)	John Virgo (Mike)	Fans rush to get the winners golf ball (Elis)	This could go anywhere on Netflix	Chris Vaughn calls Deuce Vaughn (Mike)	Crystal Palace fan (Steff)	Fans complain in 1993 (Elis)	Welsh Warriors by Fred Deakin
160	Parking The Bus	Drew Maggi makes his MLB debut after 1155 Minor League games (Steff)	Terry Griffiths, John Spencer, Len Ganley (Mike)	Walking backwards record attempt (Elis)	The Evolution of The Quarterback	Man gets hit in the groin by cricket ball (Steff)	Aidan Hutchinson (Mike)	First girl to play Rugby League at Wembley (Elis)	Mundial Magazine
161	Kate Mason (Guest Special)	Snooker interruption (Kate)	Band chases runners (Kate)	Jamie Carragher tries talking to Rafael Leao (Elis)	No documentary	Downhill Mountain Biking (Kate)			No book
162	Let's Settle This Like Men With No Girlfriends	Mr Le Maitre (Mike)	Max Rushden broadcasts as Cambridge United battle relegation (Elis)	Napoli fans on scooters (Steff)	Meanwhile, back in Sunderland	The Hoff (Mike)	Bobby Robson after Gazza's first England goal (Elis)	Mic'd up refs (Kate Mason)	Failure is an Option by Matt Whyman
163	What Kind Of Carling Goes Well With Fish?	Indoor League Supercut (Mike)	Clothes Show covers footballers, 1996 (Elis)	NFL fun (Steff)	Battling the Waves	Don't Mess with this girl (Steff)	Sunderland and Leeds United FA Cup Final 1973 player intros (Mike)	Darren Moore (Elis)	Pod Almighty by Craig Douglas, Andrew Nickolds & Nick Newman
164	Mr Titchmarsh. It's Been Done.	Tina Turner(Mike)	Jamie Carragher's perfectly timed tackle on Soccer AM (Elis)	G helps out Cav at the Giro (Steff)	Anfield 1977	Mad Biking (Steff)	Cyclist's world class swearing (Mike)	Bike skill (Elis)	Bloody Casuals, Diary of a Football Hooligan by Jay Allan
165	Felix White (Guest Special)	I EXPECT WINS! (Felix)	Jomboy on The Astros sign stealing in MLB(Felix)	Mark Nicholas gets Murali to bowl in an arm brace to prove he doesn't chuck (Felix)	No documentary				No book
166	Help Me Out Mate, This Is My Lowest Ebb	Portugal advert for World Cup (Steff)	Rory O'Connor (Mike)	Could Thierry Henry take on Kyle Walker? (Elis)	Tour de France Unchained	Rocket Ronnie and the ringpiece	Seinfeld on Golf Whispers (Steff)	One in a million moments in sport (Elis)	Cocaine + Surfing by Chas Smith
167	Richard Herring (Guest Special)	Subbuteo World Cup (Rich)	York City beat Manchester United 3-0 (Rich)	Richard playing snooker against himself (Steff)	No documentary	Free kick fun (Elis)			No book
168	Josh Widdicombe (Guest Special)	Princess Diana winning on Sports Day (Josh)	Honey Monster wins the cup (Josh)	Mr Blobby and Will Carling (Josh)	No documentary	Des, Italia 90 (Josh)			No book
169	We're Known For Our "Say Die" Attitude	1970 World Cup Final (Steff)	LFC video (Mike)	Brandi Chastain scores winning penalty in 1999 World Cup Final (Elis)	Matildas: The World at Our Feet on Disney+	Beverly Ranger (Steff)	Fouls (Mike)	Fara Williams scores from the halfway line (Elis)	She Shoots, She Scores by Catriona Clarke
170	Hoffi Pod	Blake's 7 Theme (Mike)	The Sex Pistols in Caerphilly (Elis)	Damon Albarn, the creative process... (Steff)	Elvis: That's the Way It Is	John Cleese and Michael Palin explaining Life of Brian (Steff)	Kurt Russell in Tombstone (Mike)	Alan Partridge at the racing (Elis)	The Lion and The Unicorn by George Orwell
171	Gordon Smart, Islington (a) (Guest Special)	Gordon's memories of Hibs winning the Cup (Gordon)	Scott Brown. I Dunno (Gordon)	John Jeffrey playing for Wales (Steff)	No documentary	John Conteh, Dudley Moore, Peter Cook on Parky (Elis)	Micheal Block hole in one at US PGA (Mike)	Sean Connery in a lift	It's Been Emotional by Vinnie Jones
172	Or Will You Choose Number Three?	Cilla Black singing Eye of The Tiger (Mike)	Lee Trundle (Elis)	Fatima Witbread sets a Javelin World Record (Steff)	40 Minutes episode on the Bodyline Ashes Series	Jeremiah Azu wins the 100m U23 European Championship (Elis)	1986 NRL Grand Final (Mike)	Alexander Robertson and three generations of Socceroos (Steff)	Exercised by Daniel Lieberman
173	Greg Jenner (Guest Special)	Spectacular misses in 5-a-side football match in Turkey (Greg)	Gareth Bale's best moments (Greg)	Bill Bailey plays the Match of the Day theme (Greg)	No documentary	White Bear falls over A LOT (Greg)	Ski Sunday theme tune		No book
174	The Golden Helmet	Reid and Hewett win doubles title for fifth time (Steff)	Best advert ever (Elis)	Stone skipping with Kurt (Mike)	The Dragon On My Shirt on Red Wall+	Under the Covers (Steff)	Aaron Ramsey joins Cardiff City (Elis)	Speedball Masterclass (Mike)	Jean-Pierre Rives by Peter Bills
175	Adam Hurrey (Guest Special)	You can't give the opposition a sniff (Steff)	Saint and Greavsies's last shows (Elis)	Bill Leslie gently promotes Dove (Adam)	No documentary	Gary Lineker in Japan (Adam)	A tour of Richard Keys home in Doha		No book
176	Who Was The Welsh One Who Discovered America?	Top Fiji RWC moments (Elis)	USA, Double World Champions (Steff)	Non Evans interview (Mike)	XV: Beyond The Tryline on Amazon Prime	Chile (Steff)	France v New Zealand 1999 (Elis)	Eddie Jones (Mike)	The Hardest Test by Scott Quinnell
177	Do You Like Thinking? Thank A Philosopher	Dickie Bird on Parky (Mike)	when you lose a Grand Slam Final (Elis)	Femke Bol at the World Championships (Steff)	The Deepest Breath on Netflix	George Best talking about his dad (Elis)	Doug Wood Snooker Theme Dragracer (Mike)	Get The Ball (Steff)	The Men On Magic Carpets by Ed Hawkins
178	I've Been On Tele For 39 Years	Siya Kolisi being brilliant (Mike)	Rugby League comes to Cardiff (Elis)	Steve Jones World Record (Steff)	The Loophole	Martin Brundle gets frightened by a tall man (Elis)	Alex Steele, cricketer (Mike)	Cycle ball (Steff)	My Sporting Life by Michael Parkinson
179	Develop A Relationship With The Ball	Jonny on drop goals (Mike)	8 year old breaks 1500m world record (Elis)	Danny Dyer in Dundee (Steff)	Quarterback on Netflix	Lazio goalkeeper scores incredible goal (Elis)	Nicky Little (Mike)	Bo knows (Steff)	Touching Distance by James Cracknell
180	I Do Not Get DOMS, I Don't Believe In It	Eddie Jones (Mike)	Ange Postecoglou (Elis)	Camera angle shows sport at its best (Steff)	Legends of Welsh Sport: Carwyn Williams	Brighton (Elis)	World Bowls (Mike)	Adam Beard's 50th cap (Steff)	Belonging by Owen Eastwood
181	What's That Biggins?	Don't jinx it (Mike)	Scott Gibbs (Elis)	Nigel Mansell (Steff)	The Engineer on Sport Explains The World	What happened to the fastest boys in history (Elis)	Kenny Rogers tests my devotion (Mike)	Carl Frampton's kids (Steff)	Football is a funny game by Saint and Greavsie
182	After About Two Hours I Just Gave Up And Slept In A Hedge	Kyra Poh, indoor sky diver (Mike)	Fonzie shouting out Ange Postecoglou (Elis)	South Sudan Basketball team make the Olympics (Steff)	Arnold on Netflix	Mascot has to be stretchered off after being rugby tackled (Elis)	Shane Lowry, Ryder Cup (Mike)	Guy who jumped in the water at the Ryder Cup jumps in the water again... twice (Steff)	Riding With The Rocket Men, by James Witts
183	Would You Like To Join Steffan's Show?	John Curry (Steff)	Scottish fan (Elis)	Arnold on aging (Mike)	Beckham on Netflix	Swansea City ballboy gets kicked (Elis)	Barry John on drop goals (Mike)	Birmingham City fans (Steff)	Becoming Forrest, by Rob Pope
184	A Bit of Apples	Goalkeepers from the 70s doing odd things (Steff)	Cian Ashford relives his first goal for Wales (Elis)	Zion Clark (Mike)	The Lights of Wrigleyville	Boomerang (Elis)	Jim Hamilton on TT with Craig Doyle (Mike)	Bad ideas on social (Steff)	Nobody Beats Us, by David Tossell
185	Self-Styled Hulkamaniac	Flag Football at 2028 Olympics (Steff)	Gianfranco Zola on Jude Bellingham (Elis)	Brian Doby, Manitoba Bisons on Maya the kicker (Mike)	Welcome to Wrexham, Series 1 Episode 9	Referee becomes injured, Wales v Scotland 1976 (Elis)	Ray Parlour. Obviously. (Mike)	Cornwall at the RWC (Steff)	Everybody Wants To Rule The World by Roger Domeneghetti
186	No Such Thing As a Fish (Guest Special)	Javelin technique	German Bobsleigh	The battle of the sexes	No documentary	The Balloon World Cup	1971 Women's World Cup	Tug of War	Everything to Play For: The QI Book of Sports
187	I Think She Could Believe Her Luck	Cool reporter (Steff)	Ange Postecoglou (Elis)	Seve on Americans (Mike)	Tanni Grey Thompson: Legends of Welsh Sport	Carlisle United commentator (Elis)	Tommy Lasorda (Mike)	Motorbikes and football!! (1959) (Steff)	Everything To Play For: The QI book of Sports by James Harkin & Anna Ptaszynski
188	A Mug Of KenCafé	Jason Bowen shirt (Steff)	Angry non league manager (Elis)	Dr Vaughan Thomas. 1970s sports science (Mike)	Grandstand x The Beatles 22 February 1964:	Daniel Sturridge on wide forwards (Elis)	100 year old England fan (Mike)	Issy Bunyan (Steff)	When Lions Roared by Tom English and Peter Burns
189	I'd Rather Go To A Galatasaray Match, Wearing An Away Shirt	Ainsley Harriott getting caught in the middle of a Besiktas/Fenerbahce riot (Steff)	Welsh football team chucking a rugby ball around (Elis)	General Melchett does football (Mike)	Paul Merson: Football, Gambling and Me	Johnny Giles being interviewed after a game (Elis)	Mike McDaniel presser (Mike)	EEC football match in 1973 "The Three" v "The Six" (Steff)	Nowhere to Run by Jonathan Sayer
190	Clapham Grand, London (a): Live Show Special	Burn! (Mike)	WTF (Mike)	Cook Island kicker proves commentator wrong (Steff)	No Documentary	Mary Earps F**k Off (Steff)	Cans (Elis)	Skills (Elis)	No book
191	Humphrey Ker Live at William Aston Hall, Wrexham (h): Live Show Special	Goalposts (Elis)	The Super Bowl Shuffle (Humphrey)	Super Bowl Shuffle Tribute, The Superbroker Shuffle (Humphrey)	No documentary	Sex Offender Shuffle (No-one)	Tottenham, Tottenham (Humphrey)	Anfield Rap (Humphrey)	No book
192	The Outdoor Amusement Committee	John Noakes Cresta Run (Mike)	Ellis Jenkins on mic (Steff)	Romario at 57 (Mike)	Wonderland: The Alice Street Story	Cool Footballs (Steff)	Kevin Sinfield at CRFC (Mike)	Cilla playing football (Elis)	The Poetry of Benjamin Zephaniah
193	His Guts Split Open And It Was The King Of Spades	That's your job (Elis)	Surfer takes her gran surfing (Steff)	El Tel. If I Can Dream (Mike)	Frozen Out	Emma Finucane (Steff)	Pádraig Harrington (Mike)	Football to non fans (Elis)	Good For A Girl: A Woman Running In A Man's World by Lauren Fleshman
194	Stuck In The Middle With Poo	Jocky Wilson vs Cliff Lazarenko (Mike)	The Chase - Fanny Chmelar (Steff)	Hristo Stoichkov being taught to skip by Johann Cruyff (Mike)	The Men Who Jump Off Buildings	F1 pit times (Elis)	Frank Dick (Mike)	How to run hills faster (Steff)	Althea by Sally H Jacobs
195	Pork Baguette Club	JPR (Mike)	Jurgen Klopp on Franz Beckenbauer (Elis)	Beckenbauer using just the outside of his boot (Steff)	JPR	Wolves first team training with the under 8s (Elis)	Danny Blanchflower (Mike)	Colin Walker 1970 (Steff)	We Lose Every Week by Andrew Lawn
196	Qwaylog 9	Harry Redknapp (Elis)	LRZ on move away from Rugby (Steff)	Allrounder (Mike)	Mark Cavendish: Never Enough	The art of defending by Paolo Maldini (Elis)	Peyton Manning and Jeff Saturday (Mike)	Golf Dad Joke (Steff)	The Race Against The Stasi by Herbie Sykes
197	Whelk	Drinking at the 1962 Tour de France (Elis)	Speed Golf (Steff)	Trust (Mike)	Aliy on Netflix	Steve Heighway looking for his tooth (Elis)	Ronan O'Gara (Mike)	Should we close the roads? (Steff)	Tarbuck on Golf by Jimmy Tarbuck
198	The Nerd Net	Craig Johnston's new baby (Elis)	West Indies win in Australia (Steff)	Calvin Peete (Mike)	NFL International Player Pathway Program, Undiscovered	F1 drivers training their necks (Elis)	Handre Pollard (Mike)	Women's Lions Squad (Steff)	The Silence Of The Stands by Daniel Gray
199	The 1% Club	Luke Littler's 9 darter (Elis)	Des (Steff)	Daf Jenkins (Mike)	30 for 30 Podcast, No Rules. The Birth Of UFC	News report gone wrong (Elis)	NFL to NRL, Tom Brady to Reece Walsh (Mike)	Walking a Mile in 5:31 (Steff)	The Silent Season of a Hero by Gay Talese
200	It's Been On The Radio Since 1942 Mike Barry John tribute episode	The Cefneithin Boys (Elis)	Barry John to the music of John Barry (Steff)	Barry the reporter (Mike)	Desert Island Discs, Barry John in 1978	Vimy John (Elis)	Alan John (Mike)	Sam and Ugo on Barry John (Steff)	The Barry John Story: An Autobiography

Episodes 201–250 -
Episode	Title	First Clip	Second Clip	Third Clip	Documentary	Fourth Clip	Fifth Clip	Sixth Clip	Book(s)
201	The Argus? No Offence But, The Argus? Not Even The Echo?	Jason and Travis Kelce (Mike)	Andreas Brehme (Elis)	Mikenastics (Steff)	Untold: Johnny Football	Hooking technique (1977) (Elis)	Gethin Jones (Steff)	Philadelphia Flyers Rocky (Mike)	3 Weeks * Seconds by Nige Tassell
202	Gust Episode: Suzi Ruffell & Maisie Adam From Big Kick Energy	Snowboard Fail (Suzi & Maisie)	Bunny Shaw (Suzi & Maisie)	England v Netherlands (Suzi & Maisie)	-	-	-	-	-
203	I Do It All In The Nude	What you need to do is... (Steff)	Baltimore Rygbi (Mike)	Two old sprinters (Elis)	The Playbook: Jill Ellis	AFC Wimbledon last-minute winner (Elis)	Sugar Ray Robinson and Gene Kelly, 1958 (Mike)	Rory Underwood(Steff)	A Fan For All Seasons by Jon Harvey
204	Before You Can Say Ridiculous Idea	World's fastest accountant (Elis)	The Kirkby Ski Slope (Mike)	Emotionally Intelligent Tennis Fan (Steff)	Amputating Alice	The Jedburgh Ba’ game (Mike)	Clever (Steff)	Ultra have a go at team (Elis)	Be Useful by Arnold Schwarzenegger
205	Best of Episode: 6	-	-	-	-	-	-	-	-
206	Best of Episode: 7	-	-	-	-	-	-	-	-
207	Scott Quinnell (Guest Special)	Scott on Tourist Trap with Mike (Scott)	Scott's Dentist (Scott)	Derek Quinnell 1st Cap (Scott)	No documentary	Seve (Scott)	-		No book
208	Don't You Know Who I Think I Am?	Football in Port Talbot (Steff)	Jasmin Paris (Mike)	Athletic Bilbao fans serenade a couple on their wedding day (Elis)	The Other Shore	Wilma Rudolph’s 3 Golds (Steff)	Eli and [[Odell_Beckham_Jr.|OBJ (Mike)	American Football in the9 1940s (Elis)	The 10 Football Matches That Changed The World ... and the One That Didn't by Jim Murphy
209	I Find It So Pathetic That People Would Pay To Hear You Speak, That I’d Rather You Didn’t Put Food On The Table	Roy on Micah (Mike)	Babe Didrikson Zaharias, Golf Hall of Famer, Olympic sprinter (Steff)	James Horncastle on TNT (Elis)	Counterpunch on Netflix	Bryan Sperry scores touchdown age 89 (Elis)	Marta (Steff)	Gary and Amy (Mike)	Loose Head by Joe Marler
210	Batman's Mate	Club golfer (Mike)	Leighton James becomes the first Welshman to score the winner at Wembley (Elis)	ACDC (Steff)	Mighty Ruthie	Charley Pride (Steff)	Technique plus Attitude (Mike)	A selfish wanker (Elis)	erm... (Mike's "Choice")
211	Café Owners Are Sexy	9 a side rugby for under 11s, Trimsaran 1974 (Elis)	Nits & a Welsh dad (Mike)	Lloyd Martin Marathon (Steff)	The Saint of Second Chances	Lunatic does London Marathon Pissed (Elis)	County Championship returns (Steff)	Five year old Eldrick Woods (Mike)	The Beautiful Poetry of Football Commentary by Charlie Eccleshare
212	Mammoth (1979)	Tracy Austin wins US Open at 16 (1979) (Steff)	1979 - does football in England need more investment (Elis)	Terry Griffiths (Mike)	Arrows	1979 World of Sport (Elis)	Trevor Francis wins European Cup (Mike)	Seb Coe 3 world records in 41 days (Steff)	The Great Shark Hunt by Hunter S Thompson
213	It Was Always Plan A	76 year old boxer (Elis)	Eddie Hall does ads (Mike)	US Presidents throwing baseballs (Steff)	Walmsley	Margaret McEwen-King 1977 (Mike)	Tom Duggan. He's a 14yr old Welsh weightlifter who's smashing records (Elis)	VAR, how they actually draw lines (Steff)	Double Dragon, Double Lion by John Devereux
214	Danny Wallace (Guest Special)	Esports (Danny)	Motivational Speeches (Danny)	Mo Farrah (Danny)	No documentary	Ian Botham (yes... we did this as a documentary, but it's still funny... very funny) (Danny)	-	-	No book
215	This Country's Gone To The Bonkers	Kerry 'Skull' O'Keefe(Mike)	Greavsie, put through his paces (Elis)	Agassi v Sampras advert (Steff)	Bye Bye Barry	Dan Orlovsky on playbooks (Mike)	Diego Simeone, king shithouse (Elis)	1936 women's golf (Steff)	One Track Mind by Michael Stocks
216	Take Two Bottles Into The Kitchen?	Ian Rush scoring the winner against Germany, June 1991, 1–0 in qualifier for Euro '92 (Elis)	Dentist Chair story pre Euro 96 (Steff)	Scotland Euro Ad (Mike)	France 1984	First Euros (Mike)	1988 England team hotel (Steff)	Ronnie Whelan goal for Ireland against the Soviet Union, Euro '88 (Elis)	Euro 88 by Steven Scragg
217	I'm Good, Twice a Year, for That	BBC Sports Personality of the Year 1996 - Penalty Shootout (Elis)	Rob Burrow (Mike)	George Brett,I shit my pants last night (Steff)	On Any Sunday (1971)	Leah Williamson (Steff)	Jan Mølby's first night in Liverpool (Elis)	Evel Knievel's Heaven (Mike)	Gas Masks For Goal Posts by Anton Rippon
218	Colin Murray (Guest Special)	Johnny Logan sings hold me now at Dalymount (Colin)	Prince - PURPLE RAIN at Super Bowl (Colin)	ANDREA BOCHELLI AT LEICESTER (Colin)	No documentary	Lionel Richie at the AFL Grand Final REPLAY in 2010 (Steff)	Barenaked Ladies sing USA and Canada Anthems at the hockey in Toronto (Mike)	-	No book
219	My Worst Ever Comment Had Eight Million Hates	For Christ Sake Archie! (the last 40 seconds of the clip) (Elis)	Former France Goalkeeper Joel Bats singing (Steff)	Eddie Hearn and Ryan Garcia's dad (Mike)	The Russian Five	Motorbikes (Steff)	Johnson Wagner and Bryson (Mike)	Subbuteo World Cup 1994 (Elis)	1923 The Mystery of Lot 212 and a Tour de France Obsession by Ned Boulting
220	Peace & Love, Peace & Love	Tea (Mike)	Slip on the wet floor, did you? (Elis)	Big Phil (Steff)	Williams and Mansell: Red 5	Cardiff Dragons Netball (Steff)	Baseball (Mike)	Scotland fans (Elis)	Inshallah Utd by Nooruddean Chowdry
221	The Jackets of Paul Heaton with Elis & The Rock	Grace Harris needs a new bat (Steff)	Georgi Kinkladze scores against Wales (Elis)	Brady. Incredible. (Mike)	Senna	Carl Lewis v Mike Powell 1991 (Steff)	David Gower (Elis)	Willie Rushton on Cricket (Mike)	George Best A Memoir by Michael Parkinson
222	I Am Bubbs	Berlin 1936 (Mike)	1992 110m hurdles final (Elis)	Cindy Ngamba (Steff)	I Am Bolt	1948 Olympic Torch Relay (Steff)	Steve Redgrave (Elis)	London 1908 (Mike)	The Dirtiest Race in History by Richard Moore
223	Bob Harris (Guest Special)	Ronaldo v Porto (Bob)	Miles (Expired Film Club) - AIK Gothenburg (Bob)	Miles (Expired Film Club) - Manchester United (Bob)	No documentary	-	-	-	No book
224	Stag, Stag, Stag	Umpiring at Wimbledon in the 1970s (Elis)	Spotting your family in the crowd (Steff)	Hurling (Mike)	Daley: Olympic Superstar	Tiger on Colin (Mike)	Jap Stam (Elis)	TukTuk Racing (Steff)	Brutal by Iwan Thomas (Steff chose the book despite it, or because of it, being Mike's turn)
225	Michu & His Talking Dog	Gary Neville on sacrifice (Mike)	All Michu's goals for Swansea (Elis)	Arne Slot La La Lala La (Steff)	Fever Pitch: Rise OF The Premier League	Ipswich in 1992 Chris Kiwomya (Steff)	How Lineker lived Leicester's PL win (Elis)	Bruins 1979 (Mike)	Casey at the Bat by Ernest Thayer
226	I am Outdoorsy	Max Rushden ends up on Freezing Cold Takes (Elis)	Football Coach used to be a backup dancer for MC Hammer (Steff)	Scottie Scheffeler. Nuts. (Mike)	Copa 71	Number 6 rules (Mike)	Inside the mind of Yuvraj Singh (Steff)	Manager of Wales women trains the girls at my old school (Elis)	Fearless: The Amazing Underdog Story of Leicester City, the Greatest Miracle in Sports History by Jonathan Norcroft
227	Pampas Grass & Badminton	Irish strongman (Elis)	Paul Merson (Mike)	The village in India still making Shuttlecocks the traditional way (Steff)	Andy Murray	Yorkshire man falls asleep in stadium (Elis)	Dallas (Mike)	Roger Harper runs out Graham Gooch (MMC v RoW 1987) (Steff)	The Knockout by Andy Clake
228	It's Kissing Time	Mongolia to Manchester (Mike)	Grant from Eastenders watches football on his own (Elis)	Harrison Walsh on the paradox of getting injured as a Paralympian (Steff)	The Mighty Penguins	Jimmy being Jimmy (Mike)	Craig Bellamy Interview fun (Steff)	No clip	Boy Racer & Tour De Force by Mark Cavendish
229	Cross My Palms With Cotton	Wales over 70s (Elis)	Pepe Reina (Steff)	Oasis vs Blur (Mike)	Sly	House selling done right (Mike)	Danny Jansen plays for Blue Jays and Red Sox in the same MLB match (Steff)	ITV preview Maradona ahead of the 1982 World Cup (Elis) BONUS CLIP: Emma Finucane	The Race Against Time by Richard Askwith
230	Private Jets & Carling	Paisley pitches (Elis)	Reggie Jackson (Mike)	Hoka shoe designer wins UTMB (Steff)	The Longest Feud: Chappell vs Botham	Cardiff City 1977 training (Mike)	Pontypool, 1988 (Elis)	The Original Partridge, Garry Richardson (Steff)	Before They Were Packers by Denis Gullickson & Carl Hansen
231	What Are You Drinking Mike?	1993 AFL player gets kicked out (Steff)	Kid at Red Wings vs Canucks (Mike)	Bellamy Ball (Elis)	Equal Pay	Worst miss ever (Elis)	My favourite cricket match (Steff)	The NIU vs Notre Dame Buy Game (Mike)	No-one Ever Says Thank You by Jonathan Wilson
232	You've Got a Keycard	Steff's Tom Brady Wrexham Clip (Mike)	Stuart Ripley (Elis)	Brian Whittle with one shoe (Steff)	Danny Baker presents The Game	Glenn Hoddle Masterclass at 35 (Elis)	Hibs freekick move (Steff)	NFL Play calling (Mike)	Around The World In 80 Fights by Steve Bunce
233	Breakfast. Podcast, Toilet, Sleep	Guy Who Finds The Worst Seats in Baseball (Steff)	Training for the Olympics, 1972 style (Elis)	QPR Fan meltdown (Mike)	Four Kings	Johanna Mounzer and her brother (Mike)	Andy Gray talking to himself (Elis)	The Yankees (Steff)	Unbelievable Underdogs & Rebellious Role Models by James Stafford
234	Peak Ebbw Vale	Stewart Piper, 76 (Mike)	Ohtani again (Steff)	Venables coaching in Spain (Elis)	The Four Year Plan	PSG ultras turn up to park game (Elis)	Spurs Stadium NFL (Mike)	Bevan French (Steff)	No Middle Ground by Sanjeev Shetty
235	I'm Still Mike From The No Through Road	Cole Palmer fishing (Steff)	Conkers (Elis)	The Highbury LockUp (Mike)	Serena Vs The Umpire	Linford Milk (Steff)	English football's first female referee (Elis)	Terry Bradshaw (Mike)	The Boys in The Boat by Daniel James
236	You've Gotta Beat The Rocks	Landon Ashworth and Steve Alderson G4D (Mike)	Bellamy interview (Elis)	Lords (Steff)	Year of the Scab	Ben White doesn't watch football (Steff)	Roy Cropper from Corrie, Southampton away (Elis)	Have a Chinese (Mike)	Over the top and back by Tom Jones
237	Ken Tubbins	Tyreek Stephenson Karma (Mike)	Tom Jones playing rugby on TV Am in 1983 (Elis)	Threave Rovers vs Stranraer showcasing Scottish football at its finest (Steff)	The Need For Weed	Geoff Capes and Leo Sayer (Mike)	Thierry Henry adapts (Steff)	Spion Kop 1970s (Elis)	Hope I Get Old Before I Die by David Hepworth
238	Sex Radio	Saquon Barkley (Mike)	David James saving a mascot's penalty (Elis)	North Korean Women's Football (Steff)	Scrum V Top 5	World Series Fan Interference (Steff)	Swalec Cup Final 1997 (Elis)	The England rugby kit man (Mike)	The Sporting Spirit by George Orwell
239	Pwllheli Spar	Mark Hughes plays for Wales and Bayern on the same day (Elis)	NFL Lineman Kris Jenkins vs Average Joe	The good sides of social media (Steff)	42 to 1	Park Marks (Steff)	Cav's final race (Elis)	Swann to Ponting	Stand up and fight: When Munster beat the All Blacks by Alan English
240	Best of Episode: 8	-	-	-	-	-	-	-	-
241	Twenty Minutes	I've Shit Myself (Steff)	Mr Tom Platz (Mike)	Kids Commentating (Elis)	Quiz Ball 1966	Sammy Harvey - 14-Year-Old Goalkeeper (Steff)	Liam Williams and Josh Adams (Mike)	Rafa Benitez (Elis)	C'mon Cymru by Keith Haynes
242	Chesney Hawkes (Guest Special)	Chesney's First West Ham Game (Chesney)	Chesney on The Games (Chesney)	Dancing on Ice Injury (Chesney)	No documentary	Chesney Meets Jarrod Bowen (Chesney)	-	-	No book
243	No Guile, No Subterfuge	Kath Morgan's reaction to Wales qualifying for a major tournament for the first time (Elis)	Jogging 1979 - a retro gem (Mike)	Spot the Distant Pod hat in the stands at the Las Vegas Raiders vs Kansas City Chiefs NFL game (Steff)	Doug Mountjoy: Legends of Welsh Sport	He's No' Finish'! - Funniest talkSPORT caller ever? (Steff)	Mark Gastineau confronts Brett Favre for 'diving' against Michael Strahan (Mike)	Terry Griffiths talks about Kenfig Hill like it's Hollywood (Elis)	Running Wild by Simon & Julia Freeman
244	Leroy Brito (Guest Special)	Kobe doesn't flinch (Leroy)	Diana Ross' epic penalty miss (Leroy)	Salt Bae at the World Cup final (Leroy)	No documentary	Brazil Airport Advert - A World Cup classic! (Leroy)	-	-	No book
245	The Elephant In The Room	Bullseye Christmas 1991 (Mike)	USA Rugby Ilona Maher - most followed rugby player on social media (Steff)	Swansea fans at Kenilworth Rd (Elis)	Bob Morgan: Legends of Welsh Sport	Lions v France 1989 (Steff)	Try Time (Mike)	Wales Away, Switzerland 1999 (S4C Music Programme iDot) (Elis)	Admiral: 50 Years of Replica Kits
246	The Race Is Back On	Scott Quinnell being Scott Quinnell (Elis)	Kevin De Bruyne recreates Home Alone (Steff)	Magnus Midtbø vs Eddie Hall (Mike)	30 for 30 - All In: Sparking the Poker Boom	England players' trick shots (Steff)	The logistics behind the Tampa Bay Buccaneers (Mike)	No-look backpass (Elis)	On Days Like These by Tim Rich Sync by Dan Tyte
247	Do You Want To Eat A Dead Pig?	Denis Frisoli's Tower of Death (Mike)	Neil Jenkins' try against Ireland in (1991) (Elis)	Phil Salt back in Barbados (Steff)	Project 1000	Luke Littler (Mike)	Zola (Elis)	Ball Hawks outside Wrigley Field (Steff)	Boys Don't Cry, Girls Can't Throw by Martin Nash
248	Sparky's Thighs	Rich Russo and the NFL production truck (Mike)	France vs Wales, 1987 (Elis)	Freddy Adu, football's young prodigy (Steff)	Mark Hughes: Legends of Welsh Sport	Sushila Meena's inspiring story (Mike)	Mark Delaney's unforgettable Cardiff v Chester moment in 1998 (Elis)	Dupont winning Olympic gold in rugby sevens (Steff)	Gypsy Jem Mace by Jeremy Poolman
249	Exiting The Ralgex Era	The Buccaneers' bizarre ball situation (Mike)	Eddie Hall gets a kicking (Elis)	A ski jumper wins a major competition and gets... towels. Yes, really (Steff)	The Fog Bowl	NFL officials being as NFL as it gets (Mike)	A deeper dive into the ski jumper's shocking treatment (Steff)	Brian Clough at the 1988 Labour Party Conference (Elis)	Go to War by Jon Spurling
250	That's So Cool	NFL icon Larry Czonka in action (Mike)	Vintage weightlifting brilliance, 1965 (Elis)	Northern Division's win over New Zealand in 1979 (Steff)	Denis Law: The King	Bruce Dickinson swapping the mic for a fencing foil (Elis)	Bridgend's shock win over Wales in 1989 (Steff)	Cian Ashford's dream goal (Mike)	There's Always This Year by Hanif Abdurraquib

Episodes 251–300 -
Episode	Title	First Clip	Second Clip	Third Clip	Documentary	Fourth Clip	Fifth Clip	Sixth Clip	Book(s)
251	Moderately Messianic	Braxton McCullough (Mike)	George W. Bush playing golf (Steff)	Brian O'Driscoll on being dropped from the Lions Squad (Elis)	Johnny Owen: Legends of Welsh Sport	Friday Night Football music deep dive (Mike)	Winter Spine Race madness (Steff)	Scott Quinnell scaring the life out of a presenter (Elis)	Rugby Characters by Cliff Morgan & John Ireland
252	Just Put A Towel Over My Head	Jiffy on Shane Williams (Mike)	Nipsy, the Barnsley game (Elis)	The best (and rudest) fake names on Peloton (Steff)	The Arctics	A man in Barnoldswick builds his own football stand (Elis)	Ronnie (Mike)	Clarissa Sheilds' becomes a three-weight undisputed champion (Steff)	The TB12 Method by Tom Brady
253	Papering Over The Cracks	Bernard Hopkins vs Buncey (Elis)	The legend of Dennis Bree (Mike)	Australia hammer England (Steff)	Becoming the GOAT: The Tom Brady Story	Lauren Price vs Natasha Jones (Steff)	Jason Robinson doing what Jason Robinson does (Elis)	Conor Moore's impressions (Mike)	How to Win by Dr. Katy Hays
254	Emily Campbell (Guest Special)	The Worm - Sports' Greatest Prematch? (Emily)	Matthias Steiner's Emotional Gold (Emily)	Weightlifting Glory! (Emily)	No documentary	-	-	-	No book
255	Sexy But Contrite	Arthur Emyr has the game of his life (Elis)	Sports reporter Emma Jones - The DM hotline (Steff)	Dan Marino doing Dan Marino things (Mike)	Battling to Belong: Lodge Boys	Steve McMahon chasing a lost cause, 1988 (Elis)	The sheer power of Ward Lemmlijn (Steff)	Tommy Bowe and Donncha O'Callaghan (Mike)	The Professionals by Ray Didinger
256	Just Two Spanners & A Hammer Please Mate	Bridgend v Cardiff 1997 (Elis)	Stereotyping in women's sports (Steff)	Karma is a bitch (Mike)	Colin Jackson: Resilience (Legends of Welsh Sport)	Lauren Price (Steff)	Cricket from the 1920s (Elis)	Blair with THAT try (Mike)	Ask A Footballer by James Milner
257	Joe Marler (Guest Special)	Stephen Bradbury's Gold Medal Miracle (Joe)	Jonathan Edwards’ Triple Jump World Record (Joe)	Things People Do – How to Sh*t in the Arctic (Joe)	No documentary	-	-	-	No book
258	The 5th Anniversary	Duncan Ferguson Hates the Tea at Flint Town United (Steff)	Roy Keane's Reluctant Handshake (Elis)	Tom Petty's "Won't Back Down" at Florida Gators (Mike)	26.2 to Life	Sometimes Maybe Good... (Steff)	Jon Gurden on Andrew Luck (Mike)	Shithousery at Dennis Bergkamp's Testimonial (Elis)	Postwar by Tony Judt
259	Part Pity, Part Disdain	The Dangers of Going for a Piss (Elis)	Angus Gardener: RefChaos (Mike)	Foreman - 21 Years Apart (Steff)	Dorian Yates - The Original Mass Monster	Mordor Away - A genuinely terrifying away end (Elis)	Quade Cooper on Communication (Mike)	Panama beat USA (Steff)	Ghost by Jason Reynolds
260	Our Friends At The Ford Motor Company	Wally Backman Meltdown (Mike)	Steve Bull Poem by Tom Parry - Performed by Robert Plant (Elis)	Moana Pasifika Beat the Crusaders (Steff)	Premier League Stories: Aaron Ramesy	Rishi Sunak Banter (Elis)	Grand Slam Track (Steff)	Ian Poulter & Cam Smith (Mike)	Me by Elton John
261	Medium Performance	Shaun on Danny (Mike)	Phil Pugh - Proper Old School (Elis)	Millie Bright Invests in Sports Bras (Steff)	The Gareth Southgate Lecture	Àngel Rangel - What a Guy (Elis)	Watching the 1981 Super Bowl in the UK (Steff)	How Curling Stones Are Made (Mike)	Alternative Wales - Issue 17
262	Oh My God, He's 52!	Baker and Kelly (Steff)	Trying to Explain Gen Z (Elis)	What a Try! - "Vintage" rugby brilliance (Mike)	Nicky Grist: Legends of Welsh Sport	Flip Throw Madness (Steff)	Peter Williams: Cameraman, Darts Legend (Mike)	Rob Howley and Neil Jenkins, 1982 (Elis)	Warming Up by Madeleine Orr
263	Choking Out O'Toole	Maddison Levi tackle (Mike)	Craig Bellamy: Pure Passion (Elis)	Padel and Pickleball (Steff)	That Was The Team That Was: Scotland '74	Ashlyn Pinner & Brandon Gray (USF Cheer Team) (Mike)	Stefan Edburg magic (Steff)	Ajax youth team brilliance (Elis)	Absolute Pandemonium by Brian Blessed
264	Max Rushden (Guest Special)	Man Versus Beast (Max)	Steven Bradbury (Max)	Baked Beans, Penalties (Elis)	No Documentary	-	-	-	Vonk, Zoeller, Tomba... The Joy of Sporting Names (Guardian, Max Rushden)
265	Average Dick Dave	Young Rory Compilation (Mike)	Total Football in Action - Netherlands 1974 (Steff)	Hungover Marathon Runner from Swansea (Elis)	The Clubhouse	14-Year-Old Sensation in the IPL (Steff)	Just Funny - No Context Needed (Mike)	When Man City Got Relegated from the Prem (Elis)	The Art of Captaincy by Mike Brearly
266	You're The Least Real Person I've Ever Met	Have a look at the Ref... (Elis)	Slaven (Steff)	Will Greenwood praises Allan Bateman (Mike)	Ruud Gullit on The Overlap	Perfect post-match interview (Steff)	The Kop in full voice, 1974 (Mike)	Doncaster Rovers (Elis)	Raider - The Raymond Chester Story by Jon Gower
267	Show Me The Arian	Paul Tonkinson vs the Marathon Des Sables (Elis)	Leinster, Levelled Up (Mike)	Josh Tarling (Steff)	Giant Killers - Newport County	Eastenders FC (Steff)	Liverpool vs Auxerre, 1992 (Elis)	Jaxson Dart (Mike)	George's Fateful D-Day by David Brayley
268	D'You Want A Selfie?	Suuuuunderland!! (Elis)	Back Garden Goals (Mike)	Obama: Grassroots Coach (Steff)	Little Miss Sumo	Nationwide Football, 1972 (Mike)	FIFA Club World Cup (Steff)	Dutch League Madness (Elis)	26.2 Miles to Happiness by Paul Tonkinson
269	You're A Step Away From OnlyFans	Lions 1989 Tour (Elis)	Jamie Tells It Straight (Mike)	1950 Tour (Steff)	The Lions 1971	JJ Williams in 1977 (Elis)	Faz being Faz (Steff)	Siya on Jac (Mike)	SAS: Forged in Hell by Damien Lewis
270	You're Rubbish & I Mean That In A Good Way	UEFA Women's Euro 2017 Trailer (Mike)	Aitana Bonmatí (Elis)	Huge Tackles & Glorious Swearing (Steff)	The 10 years that changed women's football	Chelsea Women's Invincibles (Steff)	Hannah Cain's Equaliser v Sweden (Elis)	Football Shirts (Mike)	Mary Earps: (Little People, BIG DREAMS) by Maria Isabel Sanchez Vegara
271	Best Of The Guests	-	-	-	-	-	-	-	-
272	Due In No Small Part To Barbara Bush	Scott McTominay - Goals, grit, and glory (Steff)	Barbara Nicklaus tribute from Jack (Mike)	Sampdoria win Serie A in 1991 (Elis)	Spartan Bare Knuckle - raw and brutal	Tears (Steff)	France vs Australia - Rugby League, 1964 (Mike)	Sean Dyche football philosopher (Elis)	The Turning Season: DDR-Oberliga by Michael Wang
273	Get A Bigger Waist And A Pair Of Socks	"Proper Rugby" (Mike)	Fred Perry wins Wimbledon (Steff)	"You're too close, man!" (Elis)	No Más	Brent Stevens (Steff)	Rory McIlroy on caddie Harry Diamond (Mike)	800m gold medal warm up room (Elis)	Soul by Johnathan Harding
274	I'm Not An Owl	Pastor Joe Nelms' NASCAR prayer (Mike)	Roy Hodgson delivers an all-time post-match moment (Elis)	Dexys - "Jackie Wilson Said" with... Jocky Wilson? (Steff)	The Best of Saint & Greavsie	Softball Energy (Mike)	Claude Makélélé (Steff)	The most sarcastic goalkeeper dive you'll ever see (Elis)	Pocket Money by Gordon Burn
275	The Best of Michael Owen's Movie Club	-	-	-	-	-	-	-	-
276	See You Next Wednesday	Blue Peter & the Kevin Keegan doll (Steff)	Sky Sports breaking news like you've never seen before (Elis)	The legend of Billy Boston (Mike)	Untold: The Fall of Favre	Home run with a cricket bat (Mike)	The explosive, chaotic joy of Tejo (Steff)	Maradona warming up for the 1994 World Cup (Elis)	Veni, Vidi, Vici: When Italian Football Ruled Europe by Dominic Hougham
277	The Fat Friar	The Wisdom of Ozzy.. at the F1 (Mike)	Kenny Sansom's impressions at Euro '88 (Elis)	Grass Skiing in Leeds, 1981 (Steff)	Vive le Tour! (1962)	When a Linebacker switches to Rugby (Elis)	Chiefs vs Brumbies (Mike)	Wes Anderson does sport (sort of) (Steff)	Call of the Warrior by Gareth A Davies
278	Double Custard	Jess Fishlock's Dad (Elis)	Scottie Scheffler (Mike)	Newport County's new away kit (Steff)	The Turnaround	The Future... (Steff)	Nassar and Stokes (Mike)	Brian Clough removes pitch invader (Elis)	Living with a Legend by Kathy Botham
279	The Best Of Hoffi Pod	-	-	-	-	-	-	-	-
280	When's It Going Out?	The end of ITV Cycling (Elis)	Lions (Steff)	What I miss about playing rugby (Mike)	Jake Paul: The Problem Child	Budget Sky Sports (Steff)	Kid at King of the Cone (Mike)	Wales away to Kazakhstan, on the train (Elis)	The Official History of the Tour de France
281	He's Trying To Say Sorry	Big Jim Collie (Elis)	Steve Burton (Steff)	Phil on Tiger & Scottie Scheffler's Record (Mike)	The Gambler and His Cowboys	St Helens' Final Game (Elis)	Pre-season (Mike)	Barcelona play 60 minutes with only academy graduates (Steff)	My Favourite Year by Nick Hornby
282	Gold Top	Barry RFC (Mike)	F***ing cows (Elis)	Ronnie (Steff)	Scrum Queens: The Fight For The First World Cup	England Women's Rugby (Mike)	"Dear God" (Elis)	John Gregory singing on TV, 1999 (Steff)	A Good Walk Spoiled by John Feinstein
The Patreon Tapes 1 (Note: Due to Wondery cancelling their contract, these episodes are Patreon Only)	Terminated	Mark Hughes' wedding speech (Elis)	The Tush Push (Mike)	Piano (Steff)	A Life in Ten Pictures - Muhammad Ali	The Krypton Factor (Elis)	Seve... again (Mike)	Wheelie Bin Game (Steff)	European Football's Greatest Grounds by Leon Gladwell
The Patreon Tapes 2	The Shower Seat	You can't coach it. Except, you can (Mike)	Peter McNeely before facing Tyson (Elis)	Ricky Hatton and Steve Bunce (Steff)	Freddy Flintoff's Field of Dreams	The Price of Football (Elis)	Rams salaries in real time (Mike)	Charles Leclerc wins the Monaco Grand Prix, 2024 (Steff)	Keep Smashing it: Be Strong, Be Brave, Be Confidant by Jodie Ounsley
The Patreon Tapes 3	Danish Yogurt	Roy Keane on Mick Hucknall (Elis)	Ryder Cup USA's awful chant game (Mike)	Felix take the Intertoto Cup to Glastonbury (Steff)	Matchroom: The Greatest Showman	Richard Kone (Steff)	Messi vs Scholes (Elis)	Wired for Sound (Mike)	Beti James Article in Alternative Wales Magazine (Elis' choice. Was supposed to be Mike, but Mike Mike'd)
The Patreon Tapes 4	The Riyadh Lads	Dad and Daughter Golf (Mike)	Grandpa Skills (Elis)	Noble on Jiffy (Steff)	Coach Snoop	George Grimwade Musto (Mike)	Clough and Taylor (Elis)	Howzat! (Steff)	The Sportswriter by Richard Ford
The Patreon Tapes 5	Splinter	Cardiff Rugby's sensory pack (Mike)	There's a rat on the pitch (Elis)	The World Conker Championship (Steff)	Confessions of a Steroid Gang	Ryan Reynolds, Most charming man alive (Mike)	Running in the Dark (Steff)	Top-tier swearing from Walter Smith (Elis)	Escape by John Smith
283	Guess Who's Back	The Greatest Shoh on Earth (Mike)	GCSE Post Match Analysis (Steff)	Aussie Bloke Chopping Wood (Elis)	True North: Healy 1 England 0	Pico Lopez x Cape Verde (Steff)	Jess Fishlock (Elis)	Seb on El Tuderco (Mike)	The Barry John Book of Rugby
284	Pick Those Conkers Up	Emma Buchy - The Queen of Gymnastics (Mike)	England Fans Doing What England Fans Do (Steff)	NRL Heckling at its Finest (Elis)	Lawrence Taylor - The Man, The Myth, The Monster	Tiger at 14 - the beginning of a legend (Mike)	Beautiful Football Things™ (Elis)	Boxing - the raw, the powerful, the poetic (Steff)	When the Swans Had Everyone Smiling by John Burgum
285	Charlie Baker (Guest Special)	1988 Torquay v Swansea Play-Offs (Charlie)	Junior Kick Start (Charlie)	Outpacing Robins (Charlie)	No Documentary	-	-	-	No Book
286	The Bounty Diet	Cantona does rugby (Mike)	Ali training, VO from Norman Mailer (Elis)	F1 Drivers Names (Steff)	Geoffrey Boycott - On the Psychiatrist's Chair	Good old Clive Thomas (Elis)	Steve and Dennis (Mike)	Snooker (Steff)	Whatever Will Be, Will Be by Felix White
287	Fabio's Goose	Steward (Steff)	Canada Women beat New Zealand Women (Mike)	Ludovico Einaudi - Divernire (Elis)	Longboarding, LA to NY	Bridget Gleason Golf (Mike)	Paul Ince - Aston Villa v West Ham, 1989 (Elis)	Aberdeen (Steff)	Mike Mentzer - The Complete Heavy Duty Training System

== Bubbins Bulls**t ==
During episode 121, Mike inducted a new segment of the show for clips that he keeps meaning to discuss on the podcast but forgets about, this was to be known as "Bubbins Bulls**t" acknowledging that some of the BS that Mike mentions is worth remembering for future episodes. The first of these was Tom Brady throwing The Vince Lombardi Trophy between boats celebrating Tampa Bays win at Super Bowl LV.

== Michael Owen's Movie Club Patreon Specials ==
In July 2020, in addition to bonus Patreon content on the main podcast a sister podcast, "Michael Owen's Movie Club" was introduced, the hosts watch a fictional sporting themed film and discuss it. As the series developed, the sports themes of the selected movies became less important, instead focusing on films the presenters liked. The title comes from Michael Owen's admission that he has only ever seen 8 films and didn't like them because they aren't real.

Episodes 1–50
Episode	Date	Film	Director	Starring
1	Aug 2020	Rollerball (1975) (Mike)	Norman Jewison	James Caan, John Houseman
2	Sep 2020	Raging Bull (Elis)	Martin Scorsese	Robert De Niro, Cathy Moriarty, Joe Pesci
3	Oct 2020	Any Given Sunday (Steff)	Oliver Stone	Al Pacino, Cameron Diaz, Dennis Quaid
4	Dec 2020	The Fighter (Mike)	David O.Russell	Mark Wahlberg, Christian Bale, Amy Adams
5	Jan 2021	Moneyball (Elis)	Bennett Hill	Brad Pitt, Jonah Hill, Philip Seymour Hoffman
6	Jan 2021	The Karate Kid (Steff)	John G. Avildsen	Ralph Macchio, Pat Morita, Elisabeth Shue
7	Mar 2021	The Natural (Mike)	Barry Levinson	Robert Redford, Robert Duvall, Glenn Close
8	Apr 2021	Jerry Maguire (Elis)	Cameron Crowe	Tom Cruise, Rene Zellweger, Cuba Gooding Jr
9	Apr 2021	Escape to Victory (Steff)	John Huston	Sylvester Stallone, Michael Caine, Pelé
10	May 2021	The Longest Yard (Mike)	Robert Aldrich	Burt Reynolds, Eddie Albert, Ed Lauter
11	Jun 2021	Rocky III (Elis)	Sylvester Stallone	Sylvester Stallone, Talia Shire, Carl Weathers
12	Aug 2021	Stir Crazy (Mike)	Sidney Poitier	Richard Pryor, Gene Wilder
Special	Aug 2021	MOMC: The Best Bits... So Far...		
13	Aug 2021	Field of Dreams (Steff)	Phil Alden Robinson	Kevin Costner, Amy Madigan, James Earl Jones
14	Sep 2021	The Damned United (Elis)	Tom Hooper	Michael Sheen, Timothy Spall, Colm Meaney
15	Nov 2021	Rush (Mike)	Ron Howard	Chris Hemsworth, Daniel Bruhl, Olivia Wilde
16	Nov 2021	Cool Runnings (Mike)	Jon Turteltaub	Leon Robinson, Doug E. Doug, John Candy
17	Dec 2021	The Mighty Ducks (Steff)	Stephen Herek	Emilio Estevez, Joss Ackland, Lane Smith
18	Feb 2022	The Replacements (Mike)	Howard Deutch	Keanu Reeves, Gene Hackman, Rhys Ifans
19	Feb 2022	Fat City (Elis)	John Huston	Stacy Keach, Jeff Bridges, Susan Tyrrell
20	Mar 2022	I, Tonya (Steff)	Craig Gillespie	Margot Robbie, Sebastian Stan, Julianne Nicholson
21	Apr 2022	Slap Shot (Steff)	George Roy Hill	Paul Newman, Strother Martin, Jennifer Warren
22	May 2022	Brewster's Millions (Mike)	Walter Hill	Richard Pryor, John Candy, Lonette McKee
23	July 2022	Caddyshack (Elis)	Harold Ramis	Chevy Chase, Rodney Dangerfield, Ted Knight
24	July 2022	The Blind Side (film) (Mike)	John Lee Hancock	Sandra Bullock, Quinton Aaron, Tim McGraw
25	'September' 2022	Hustle (Mike)	Jeremiah Zagar	Adam Sandler, Queen Latifah, Juancho Hernangomez
26	'October' 2022	Hoosiers (Elis)	David Anspaugh	Gene Hackman, Barbara Hershey, Dennis Hopper
27	'November' 2022	Mike Bassett: England Manager (Mike)	Steve Barron	Ricky Tomlinson, Amanda Redman, Bradley Walsh
Special	December 2022	Best of MOMC: Since the Last Best of MOMC		
28	January 2023	The Phantom of the Open (Mike)	Craig Roberts	Mark Rylance, Sally Hawkins, Rhys Ifans
29	February 2023	Heaven Can Wait (Steff)	Warren Beatty, Buck Henry	Warren Beatty, Julie Christie, James Mason
30	March 2023	Grand Slam (Mike)	John Hefin	Hugh Griffith, Windsor Davies, Sharon Morgan
31	April 2023	Tin Cup (Elis)	Ron Shelton	Kevin Costner, Rene Russo, Don Johnson
32	May 2023	The Arsenal Stadium Mystery (Steff)	Thorold Dickinson	Leslie Banks, Greta Gynt, Ian McLean
33	June 2023	Air (Mike)	Ben Affleck	Matt Damon, Ben Affleck, Jason Bateman, Viola Davis
34	July 2023	Battle of the Sexes (Elis)	Valerie Faris and Jonathan Dayton	Emma Stone, Steve Carell, Andrea Riseborough
35	August 2023	Invincible (Steff)	Ericson Core	Mark Wahlberg, Greg Kinnear, Elizabeth Banks
36	September 2023	Bull Durham (Mike)	Ron Shelton	Kevin Costner, Susan Sarandon, Tim Robbins
37	October 2023	The Hurricane (Steff)	Norman Jewison	Denzel Washington, John Hannah, Deborah Kara Unger
38	November 2023	The Wrestler (Elis)	Darren Aronofsky	Mickey Rourke, Marisa Tomei, Evan Rachel Wood
39	December 2023	Rocky IV (Steff)	Sylvester Stallone	Sylvester Stallone, Talia Shire, Burt Young
40	January 2024	JFK (Steff)	Oliver Stone	Kevin Costner, Gary Oldman, Jack Lemmon
41	February 2024	Shaolin Soccer (Mike)	Stephen Chow	Stephen Chow, Zhao Wei, Ng Man-tat
42	March 2024	White Men Can't Jump (Elis)	Ron Shelton	Woody Harrelson, Wesley Snipes, Rosie Perez
43	April 2024	The Beautiful Game (Steff)	Thea Sharrock	Bill Nighy, Micheal Ward
44	May 2024	A League Of Their Own (Mike)	Penny Marshall	Tom Hanks, Geena Davies, Madonna
45	June 2024	Dodgeball (Elis)	Rawson Marshall Thurber	Vince Vaughn, Ben Stiller, Rip Torn
46	July 2024	He Got Game (Steff)	Spike Lee	Denzel Washington, Ray Allen, Milla Jovovich
47	August 2024	The Rack Pack (Mike)	Brian Welsh	Luke Treadaway, Will Merrick, Kevin Bishop
48	September 2024	Death Race 2000 (Elis)	Paul Bartel	David Carradine, Simone Griffeth, Sylvester Stallone
49	October 2024	The Boys In The Boat (Steff)	George Clooney	Joel Edgerton, Callum Turner, Peter Guinness
50	November 2024	Talladega Nights (Mike)	Adam McKay	Will Ferrell, John C. Rielly, Sacha Baron Cohan

Episodes 51–100 -
Episode	Date	Film	Director	Starring
51	December 2024	The Naked Gun (Elis)	David Zucker	Leslie Nielsen, Priscilla Presley, Ricardo Montalban
52	January 2025	Chariots of Fire	Hugh Hudson	Ben Cross, Ian Charleson, Ian Holm
53	February 2025	This Is Spinal Tap	Rob Reiner	Michael McKean, Christopher Guest, Harry Shearer
54	March 2025	Monty Python's Life of Brian	Terry Jones	Graham Chapman, John Cleese, Eric Idle
55	April 2025	Le Mans 66'	James Mangold	Christian Bale, Matt Damon, Jon Bernthal
56	May 2025	Yesterday's Hero	Neil Leifer	Ian McShane, Suzanne Somers, Adam Faith
57	June 2025	The Breakfast Club	John Hughes	Emilio Estevez, Paul Gleeson, Anthony Michael Hall
58	July 2025	Weekend at Bernie's	Ted Kotcheff	Andrew McCarthy, Johnathan Silverman, Terry Kiser
59	August 2025	The Running Man	Paul Michael Glaser	Arnold Schwarzenegger, María Conchita Alonso, Richard Dawson
60	September 2025	A Hard Day's Night	Richard Lester	The Beatles, Wilfred Brambell, Norman Rossington
61	October 2025	Stand By Me	Rob Reiner	Wil Wheaton, River Phoenix, Corey Feldman

== Hoffi Pod ==
Episode 170 of The Socially Distant Sports Bar, named 'Hoffi Pod', used the regular format of the Podcast (2 rounds of 3 clips, a documentary, and a book) only without the restrictions of using Sport-adjacent themes. In September 2023, Hoffi Pod began as a Patron exclusive series, where the presenters usually discuss 3 non-sports clips, occasionally discussing a documentary.

Episode	Date	Title	First Clip	Second Clip	Third Clip
2	September 2023	World's Number One...	Liam Gallagher (Steff)	Burton on Sinatra (Mike)	How a Neanderthal might have counted to three (Elis)
3	October 2023	We're On In An Hour?	Rustie Lee (Steff)	A hungover Blur on tour, 1993 (Elis)	Pet Lion (Mike)
4	November 2023	Mel O'Birds	Michael Buerk and Ian McCaskill in the aftermath of 1987's Great Storm (Steff)	Barcelona Guitar Trio - Billie Jean (Mike)	Bert Jansch guitar tutorial (Elis)
5	December 2023	Christmas Special	JDB on TFI (Steff)	1993 BBC TV (Elis)	Nat King Cole The Christmas Song (Mike)
6	January 2024	She's Got What It Takes	One More Time (Steff)	Road Safety (Mike)	British Pork Advert (Elis)
7	February 2024	VN	Judy Dench Shakespeare (Mike)	Bored man does degree (Elis)	Jimmy Somerville (Steff)
8	March 2024	Barry Boys' PE Dept	No Clips - (Mike talks about his time at Barry Boys Comprehensive)		
9	April 2024	Teeth Like Wholemeal Bread	Critics (Elis)	The Best Video on the Internet (Steff)	Orson Wells on his art (Mike)
10	May 2024	Ooo, You're Hard	East Germany (Elis)	Learning the Guitar (Mike)	Instant Coffee (Steff)
11	June 2024	I'm A Gardener And I Don't Mind Who Knows It	Peter Duncan up Big Ben 1980 (Steff)	Eisteddfod (Mike)	Super Furry Animals on Tonight with Richard and Judy, 1996 (Elis)
12	July 2024	Wait Until You're 50	Jim Carrey speech (Steff)	Gardening (Mike)	Van Halen have an absolute nightmare (Elis)
13	August 2024	I'm Not You're Mate...	Hotel Room Happy Hour (Steff)	Rianne Downey (Mike)	The Fast Show: Indie club (Elis)
14	September 2024	Salem	Crisps (Elis)	Steve Martin on John Candy (Mike)	Jazz Band learn Nirvana (Steff)
15	October 2024	Forty Minutes	Documentary - Rough Justice		
16	November 2024	Lasers	Blue Peter, The Future (Elis)	The Cure (Mike)	No clip (Steff)
17	December 2024	Dick Van Dyke	Dick Van Dyke's timeless humor (Steff)	Glen Campbell and Carl Jackson's incredible Duelling Banjos performance (Mike)	Steve Coogan on writing with Peter Baynham (Elis)
18	January 2025	Ffa Coffi Pawb	Documentary - Ffa Coffi Pawb		
19	February 2025	Orange	George Michael with Queen (Steff)	Cardinal Burns' Old Skool vs New Skool Rap (Elis)	Eminem on creating (Mike)
20	March 2025	Burning The 4:30pm Oil	Flight of the Conchords - Father and Son (Steff)	Spend, Spend, Spend - the tale of Viv Nicholson (Elis)	Full Nostalgia mode with Fyfe Robertson (Mike)
21	April 2025	Bubbins' About	Mad cold remedies from the BBC archive (Elis)	Jokes - a vintage masterclass in comedic timing and storytelling (Mike)	The chaotic brilliance of Jack Black (Steff)
22	May 2025	Merlin	Brahm's 4th Symphony (Mike)	The Old Oak of Carmarthen (Elis)	Tiny Desk Concerts (Steff)
23	June 2025	I've Never Had A Fight Myself	Robson Green talks about Top of the Pops (Steff)	Fighting in Australian Pubs,1960s (Elis)	Tom Cruise talks about acting (Mike)
24	July 2025	Chedder	Billy Joel at Citi Field - Mets Fans sing Piano Man (Mike)	Hall, Gannon, and Broudie - Three Titans of the UK Indie scene (Steff)	Billy Connolly in full flow (Elis)
25	August 2025	Stunt Bum	Passing your driving test in 1994 (Elis)	A slice of David Brent (Mike)	The greatest sandwich ever made (Steff)
26	September 2025	In The Cistern	Al Pacino's "cockney" accent (Mike)	Nicolas Cage on Wogan (Elis)	Paul Simon and George Harrison (Steff)
27	October 2025	Normcore	Mud Walking (Mike)	The Fart Guy (Steff)	Rural Dating (Elis)
28	November 2025	The Universe	Going big with The Universe (Mike)	Yes by McAlmont & Butler (Elis)	Orchestra perform No Surprises (Steff)

== Pint Sized Distant Pod ==
In November 2022, the podcast started to look back through their archive of episodes and selected some favourite stories, anecdotes and funny bits. The first clip was taken from "Episode 39: I Couldn't Bare To Think Of You Eating Cold Beans" recalling Mike's story of buying a camping stove for an optician he had just met.
