= Kurt Steiner =

Kurt Steiner may refer to:

- Kurt Steiner (stone skipper) (born 1965), American Guinness World Record-holder for stone skipping
- André Ruellan (1922–2016), French writer who used the pen name Kurt Steiner
