= Stone skipping =

Skill of throwing a stone across water

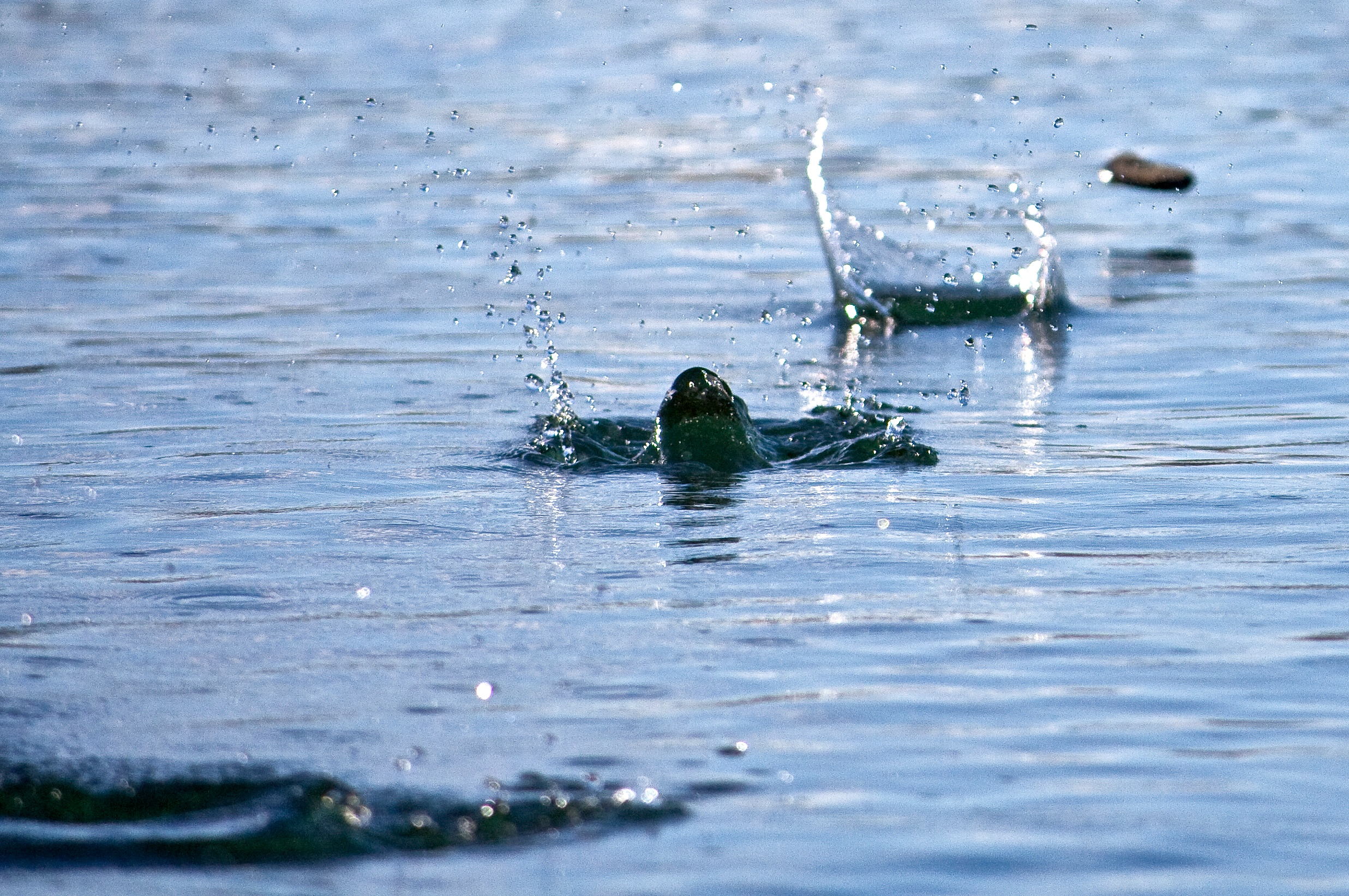
A stone skimming across the water

Stone skipping in slow motion

Stone skipping and stone skimming are the arts of throwing a flat stone across water in such a way (usually sidearm) that it bounces off the surface. "Skipping" counts the number of bounces; "skimming" measures the distance traveled.

== History ==
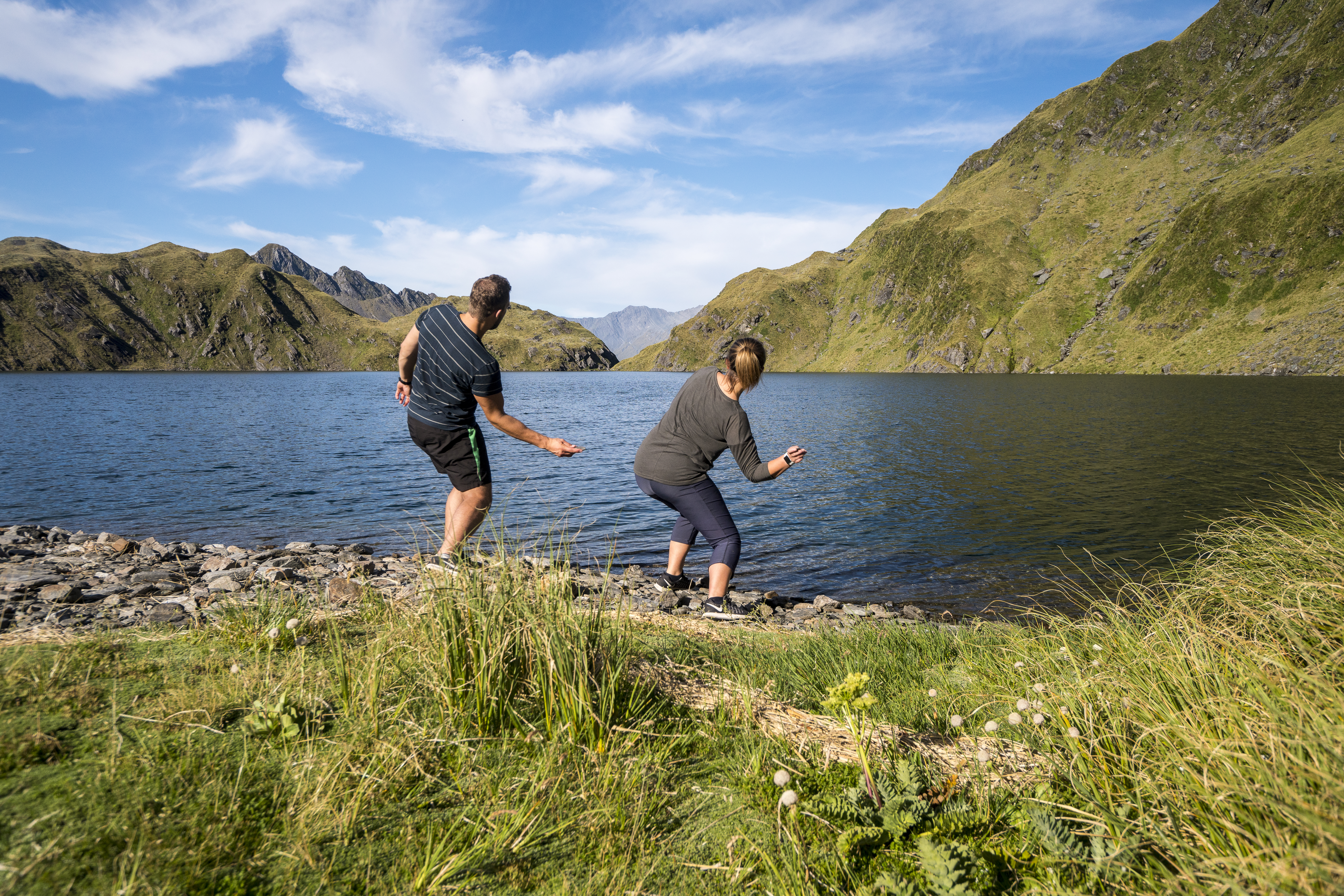
People skipping stones in Haast, New Zealand

The 2nd-century CE Greek scholar Julius Pollux included an entry for stone skipping in his dictionary Onomasticon. The 3rd-century CE Latin writer Marcus Minucius Felix described children skipping shells on the beach. In England, a 1583 text calls it "Ducks and Drakes". An early explanation of the physics of stone-skipping was provided by Lazzaro Spallanzani in the 18th century.

=== Records ===
The world record for the number of skips, according to the Guinness Book of Records, is 88, by Kurt "Mountain Man" Steiner. The cast was achieved on September 6, 2013, at Red Bridge in the Allegheny National Forest, Pennsylvania. The previous record was 65 skips, by Max Steiner (no relation), set at Riverfront Park, Franklin, Pennsylvania. Before him, the record was 51 skips, set by Russell Byars on July 19, 2007, skipping at the same location. Kurt Steiner also held the world record between 2002 and 2007 with a throw of 40 skips, achieved in competition in Franklin, PA.

The Guinness World Record for the furthest distance skimmed using natural stone stands at 121.8m for men, established by Dougie Isaacs (Scotland), and 52.5m for women, thrown by Nina Luginbuhl (Switzerland). These records were made on 28 May 2018 at Abernant Lake, Llanwrtyd Wells, Powys, Wales.

There are several stone skimming championships held. The record for most World Championship wins also sits with Dougie Isaacs (Scotland), with 8 Men's World Stone Skimming Championship wins (2005, 2007, 2010, 2011, 2013, 2014, 2015, 2016) and the Women's World Stone Skimming Championship wins record sits with Lucy Wood (England) with 5 wins (2012, 2013, 2015, 2016, 2018).

== Championships ==
The "Big Four" American stone skipping contests include (in order of establishment and participant rankings):

1. The Mackinac Island championship, held on July 4 in northern Michigan (entry by invite only; must win prior Mackinac Open or Pennsylvania Qualifier to enter);
2. The Pennsylvania championship, held usually the 3rd Saturday of August in Franklin, PA, about one hour southeast of Erie (winners invited to the subsequent Michigan contest);
3. The Vermont championship (about one month after Pennsylvania) on the shore of Lake Paran, North of Bennington; and
4. The Great Southern Stone Skipping Championships in Arkansas (the Saturday preceding Labor Day weekend) which raises funds for hunger relief.

Former world champion Coleman-McGhee founded the North American Stone Skipping Association (NASSA) in 1989 in Driftwood, Texas. NASSA-sanctioned world championships were held from 1989 through 1992 in Wimberley, Texas. The next official NASSA World Championship is expected to be held at Platja d'en Ros beach in Cadaqués, Catalonia, Spain.

A stone skimming championship takes place every year in Easdale, Scotland, where relative distance counts as opposed to the number of skips, as tends to be the case outside of the US. The event was run for more than 20 years by Donald Melville, who is seen as having done more for the sport than anyone. Since 1997, competitors from all over the world have taken part in the World Stone Skimming Championships (WSSC) in a disused water-filled quarry on Easdale Island using sea-worn Easdale slate of maximum 3" diameter. Each participant gets three throws and the stone must bounce/skip at least twice to count (i.e. 3 water touches minimum). The event featured in the 2019 BBC Scotland documentary Sink or Skim. The WSSC for 2020-2022 were cancelled due to the COVID-19 pandemic before resuming competition in September 2023. In 2025, several competitors were disqualified for tampering. Organiser Dr Kyle Mathews said: "There was a little bit of stone doctoring."

Other domestic distance-based championships in the UK are currently the Welsh and British, but they were cancelled in 2020 and 2021 for reasons including the COVID-19 pandemic. The British is next due to be held in 2023. Japan holds competitions where both skimming and skipping principles, as well as a throw's overall aesthetic quality, are taken into account to determine the winners. At present, there is also a competition at Ermatingen in Switzerland and occasionally in the Netherlands (both skimming/distance-based).

=== Men's World Skimming Championship winners by year ===
| 2025 | Jon "The Green Giant" Jennings | United States |
| 2024 | Simon Power | Ireland |
| 2023 | Finn Dower | Belgium and Scotland |
| 2022 | (Canceled due to COVID-19 pandemic) | |
| 2021 | (Canceled due to COVID-19 pandemic) | |
| 2020 | (Canceled due to COVID-19 pandemic) | |
| 2019 | Péter Szép | Hungary |
| 2018 | Péter Szép | Hungary |
| 2017 | Keisuke Hashimoto | Japan |
| 2016 | Dougie Isaacs | Scotland |
| 2015 | Dougie Isaacs | Scotland |
| 2014 | Dougie Isaacs | Scotland |
| 2013 | Dougie Isaacs | Scotland |
| 2012 | Ron Long | Wales |
| 2011 | Dougie Isaacs | Scotland |
| 2010 | Dougie Isaacs | Scotland |
| 2009 | David Gee | England |
| 2008 | Eric Robertson | Scotland |
| 2007 | Dougie Isaacs | Scotland |
| 2006 | Tony Kynn | Australia |
| 2005 | Dougie Isaacs | Scotland |
| 2004 | Andrew McKinna | Scotland |
| 2003 | Ian Brown | Scotland |
| 2002 | Alastair Judkins | New Zealand |
| 2001 | Iain MacGregor | Australia |
| 2000 | Scott Finnie | Scotland |
| 1999 | Ian Shellcock | England |
| 1998 | Ian Shellcock | England |
| 1997 | Ian Sherriff | New Zealand |
| 1993 | Joint Champions: David Rhys-Jones, Matthew Burnham, Jonathan Ford | |

=== Women's World Skimming Championship winners by year ===
| 2026 | Sian "Forth Hen" MacDonald | Scotland |
| 2025 | Lucy Wood | England |
| 2024 | Cari Jones | Wales |
| 2023 | Linsay McGeachy | Scotland |
| 2022 | (Canceled due to COVID-19 pandemic) | |
| 2021 | (Canceled due to COVID-19 pandemic) | |
| 2020 | (Canceled due to COVID-19 pandemic) | |
| 2019 | Christina Bowen-Bravery | UK |
| 2018 | Lucy Wood | England |
| 2017 | Nina Luginbuhl | Switzerland |
| 2016 | Lucy Wood | England |
| 2015 | Lucy Wood | England |
| 2014 | Helen Mannion | Scotland |
| 2013 | Lucy Wood | England |
| 2012 | Lucy Wood | England |
| 2011 | Joanne Giannandrea | Scotland |
| 2010 | Manuela Kniebusch | Germany |
| 2009 | Tessa Pirie | Scotland |
| 2008 | Jillian Hunter | Northern Ireland |
| 1997 | Cara Crosby | United States |

== Underlying physics ==
Diagram of a stone skipping

Although stone skipping occurs at the air-water interface, surface tension has very little to do with the physics of stone-skipping. Instead, the stones are a flying wing akin to a planing boat or Frisbee, generating lift from a body angled upwards and a high horizontal speed.

The same physical effects apply to a stone when traveling in air or water. However, the force only compares to gravity when immersed in water, because the latter fluid has higher density. The result is a characteristic bouncing or skipping motion, in which a series of extremely brief collisions with the water appear to support the stone.

During each collision, the stone's horizontal velocity is approximately constant and its vertical motion can be approximated as a non-Hookean spring. The stone is only partially immersed, and lift from the immersed back suspends the stone and torques it towards tumbling. That torque is stabilized by the gyroscope effect: the stone-skipper imparts a perpendicular initial angular momentum much larger than the collisional impulse, so that the latter induces only a small precession in the axis of rotation.

Stones improperly oriented at the moment of collision will not rebound: the largest observed angle of attack preceding a rebound occurred at an angle of approximately 45°. Conversely, a stone making angle 20° with the water's surface may rebound even at relatively low velocities, as well as minimizing the time and energy spent in the following collision.

In principle, a stone can skip arbitrarily-long distances, given a sufficiently high initial speed and rotation. Each collision saps an approximately constant kinetic energy from the stone (a dynamical equation equivalent to Coulomb friction), as well as imparting an approximately constant angular impulse. Experiments suggest that initial angular momentum's stabilizing effect limits most stones: even "long-lived" throws still have high translational velocities when they finally sink.

== Names ==
- English: "skipping stones" or "skipping rocks" (North America); "lobsta cutting" (Cape Cod, North America); "stone skimming" or "ducks and drakes" (Britain); "skliffing" or "skiting" (Scotland) and "stone skiffing" (Ireland)
- Bengali: "frog jumps" (Bengbaji); "kingfisher" (Machhranga)
- Bulgarian: "frogs" (жабки)
- Cantonese: "skipping (little) stones" (片石(仔)) [pin3 sek6 (zai2)]
- Catalan: "making step-stone bridges" (fer passeres); "making furrows" (fer rigalets); "skipping stones" (llençar passanelles)
- Czech: "to make/throw froggies" (dělat (házet) žabky/žabičky – countrywide and generally intelligible); "to make ducks/drakes/ducklings" (dělat kačky/kačeny/kačery/kačenky/káčata/káčírky - in East Bohemia and parts of Moravia); "little fishes" (rybičky/rybky); "saucers" (mističky); "plates/dishes" (talíře); "wagtails" (podlisky/podlíšky/lyšky); "divers" (potápky); "pot-lids" (pokličky/pukličky); "flaps" (plisky/plesky); "plops" (žbluňky); "darts" (šipky); "bubbles" (bubliny); "Jews" (židy); "figures" (páni/panáky); "gammers"/"wagtails" (babky); "dolls"/"girls"/"dragonflies" (panenky); "to ferry Virgin Mary" (převážet panenku Mariu)
- Danish: "slipping" (smut or at smutte); "to make slips" (at slå smut)
- Dutch: "bouncing" (ketsen)
- Estonian: "throwing a burbot" (lutsu viskama)
- Finnish: "throwing breads/sandwiches" (heittää leipiä/voileipiä)
- French: "making ricochets" (faire des ricochets)
- German: "stone skipping" (Steinehüpfen); colloquially i.a. "flitting" (flitschen, old synonym of schwirren, "whirring"), its diminutive flitscheln, and "bouncing" (ditschen, a variant of titschen); older synonyms rarely used are i.a. "leading the bride" (die Braut führen), "throwing frogs" (Frösche werfen), "shooting/throwing maids/virgins" (Jungfern schießen/werfen), "skiffing" (schiffeln, schippern), "springing" (schnellern, from schnellen, "springing" or "darting"), and "pebbling" (steineln)
- Greek: "little frogs" (βατραχάκια)
- Hungarian: "making it to waddle", lit. "making it walk like a duck" (kacsáztatás)
- Indonesian : lancang-lancang, batu mantul
- Italian: rimbalzello
- Japanese: "cutting water" (「水切り」[mizu kiri])
- Korean: mulsujebi (물수제비), meaning water (Korean: 물; RR: mul) and Korean soup sujebi.
- Latvian: "throwing (stone) froggies" (mest (akmens) vardītes)
- Lithuanian: "making frogs" (daryti varlytes)
- Macedonian: "frogs" (жапчиња)
- Mandarin: da shui piao (打水漂)
- Marathi: bhakrya kadhne
- Mongolian: "making the rabbit leap" (tuulai kharailgakh); "making the dog lick" (nokhoi doloolgokh)
- Nigerian: "the way a dragonfly skips across the water" (lami lami)
- Norwegian: "fish bounce" (fiskesprett)
- Polish: "letting the ducks out" (puszczanie kaczek)
- Portuguese "water shearing" ("capar a água"); "making tiny hats" ("fazer chapeletas")
- Romanian "making frogs" ("a face broaşte")
- Russian: "pancakes" (блинчики [Blinchiki]); "frogs" (лягушки [Lyagushki])
- Serbo-Croatian: "(to throw) little frogs" ([bacati] žabice)
- Spanish: "making white-caps" (hacer cabrillas); "making little frogs" (hacer ranitas); making ducklings (hacer patitos)
- Swedish: "throwing a sandwich" (kasta smörgås or kasta macka)
- Swiss German: "throwing buttered bread" (bämele); "throwing Schist" (schifere)
- Telugu: "frog jumps" (kappa gantulu)
- Turkish: "skimming stone" (taş sektirme)
- Ukrainian: "letting the frogs out" (zapuskaty zhabky)
- Farsi/Persian: "Syrian bashing" (سوری زدن)
- Vietnamese: "ricochet" (ném thia lia); "tossing stone" (liếc đá, lia đá)

== In popular culture ==
The lead character of the 2001 film Amélie skips stones along the Canal Saint-Martin in Paris as a plot point, and picks up good skipping stones when she spots them.

Societies have begun to emerge in the North West of England. They go by the name of the Liverpool Stone Skimming Society and the Manchester Stone Skimming Society. Liverpool first appeared after a bout of internet fame when they uploaded themselves skimming the width of the lake at Sefton Park.

== See also ==
- Animal locomotion on the water surface
- Bouncing bomb
- Ricochet
- Rock balancing (another hobby or pastime using stones)
- Skip bombing
