= Kurt Steiner (stone skipper) =

American stone skipper

- Born: 1965 (age 60–61); Erie, Pennsylvania
- Other name: The Mountain Man
- Known for: Stone skipping

Kurt Steiner (born 1965) is an American man who holds the Guinness World Record for stone skipping, scoring 88 bounces of the stone in 2013. Known as "The Mountain Man", Steiner resides in rural Cameron County, Pennsylvania.

== Early life ==
Kurt Steiner was born in 1965 in Erie, Pennsylvania. As a child, Steiner struggled socially but showed an early intelligence and natural aptitude for competition. He excelled at sports, computer programming, and games such as chess, pinball and arcade games like Asteroids. He earned his B.A. in English from Penn State Behrend in 1990. He picked up stone skipping as a child, leaving off in his 20s, and resuming it after college.

== Stone skipping ==
Steiner entered his first competition in 2000 at the age of 35. He spends hours sourcing and sorting thousands of his own rocks, mainly from Lake Erie. He lives today in a self-built cabin and lives a frugal, minimalist lifestyle. He focuses on both strengthening exercises like squats, as well as maintaining a low body fat percentage, in order to improve his skipping.

Steiner is widely regarded as the greatest American stone skipper, particularly after the death of his chief rival, Russell Byars. In 2013, Steiner set the current Guinness World Record with 88 consecutive skips at Red Bridge in the Allegheny National Forest, Pennsylvania. He also was the record holder for stone skipping from 2002 to 2007 with a throw of 40 skips, achieved in competition in Franklin, PA. He and Byars largely traded US national wins during this period, and Steiner credits much of his world-record throws to the heavy competition with Byars driving him. Steiner has also competed internationally, winning the 2018 Welsh Open, where he threw 373 feet. European records are determined by distance, not by the number of skips; the current world skimming title is held by Dougie Isaacs, with a skim of approximately 399 feet.

In 2023, Steiner appeared in the music video for the song "Skipping Like a Stone" by The Chemical Brothers featuring Beck.
