= Trust Oldham =

OASF (Oldham Athletic Supporters Foundation
- Abbreviation: OASF
- Formation: 2003
- Type: Football Supporters Trust
- Headquarters: Oldham, Greater Manchester, England
- Members: Free
- Chairman: Jason Flynn
- OASF Representative on OAFC Board: Paul Hughes
- Affiliations: Supporters Direct, Football Supporters' Federation
- Volunteers: 7
- Website: OASF Website

OASF (formerly Trust Oldham) is a supporters' trust, for the English football club, Oldham Athletic based in Oldham, Greater Manchester.

== Background ==
OASF was formed in 2003, after previous Latics owner Chris Moore left the club in financial dire straits. It was officially launched as Trust Oldham at a meeting in the Rochdale Road End stand at Boundary Park was formed to save the club from liquidation. The Trust's first fundraising event was a match between the Millennium Allstars and the Wembley Wizards which saw former Latics players take to the Boundary Park pitch. The event raised over £100,000.

After an American consortium made up of Simon Blitz, Danny Gazal and Simon Corney from New York City took over the reins at Boundary Park, OASF agreed to buy a 3% stake in the club for £200,000. This 3% stake gave OASF a voice on the board of directors of the football club, making it a powerful medium between the fans and the clubs.

OASF reverted to using its original Oldham Athletic Supporters Foundation OASF name in order to avoid confusion with the football club's Community Trust in 2021, and continues to work with Oldham Athletic and expand its horizons with new events and new fundraising ideas all to help secure the future of Oldham Athletic in the Borough of Oldham.

OASF has a director on the board of the football club. Many football trusts aspire to own a share in the football club they represent so they can report on the internal working with the fans and take fans ideas, suggestions and complaints to boardroom level.

A change in policy has resulted in the representative on the Board at Oldham Athletic Football Club not being the chair, to avoid conflicts of interest.

In September 2020 an election of Directors was held, with volunteer and Football Supporters' Association support, to ensure neutrality. A number of candidates withdrew just prior to the vote. The previous Representative to the Board was not re-elected. In May 2021, the Representative on the Board of Oldham Athletic was announced as Paul Hughes.

== Strategy ==
After the election in 2020, the new Board comprehensively reviewed their strategy given Oldham Athletic's increasingly precarious position. The revised strategy formed the acronym LATICS, the football club's traditional nickname. Amongst the aspects of the strategy was Investment, and part of that was the creation of a Contingency Fund in the event of the football club being left without investment or put up for sale.

== Contingency Fund ==
OASF will use 1895 branding to raise money for a contingency fund. This money will be ring-fenced for either majority shareholding, 50+1 fan ownership, purchase of the stadium or a combination. On 30 May 2021, the OASF 1895 Lottery was launched as the first contributor to the contingency fund.

== Events ==
OASF has held an annual dinner each year, usually at the White Hart in Lydgate.

OASF held "A Question of Latics" event in March 2009 at the Playhouse 2 in Shaw. Former players Ian Wood, David Eyres, Rodger Wylde and Andy Barlow joined Inspiral Carpets guitarist Graham Lambert and Lee Hughes, who at the time was a Latics player. The event took the format of a Michael Parkinson style interview followed by A Question of Sport.

In November 2009 OASF once again held "A Question of Latics" in Shaw. Andy Ritchie, Joe Royle, Andy Rhodes, Les Chapman and Lee Duxbury were among the contributors. A Room 101 segment was included.

== Purchases for the club ==
OASF has helped the club with some costs over a number of years. These have included the purchase of a mini-bus in October 2004 which is loaned to the club on an ongoing basis in a donation worth £20,000.

In April 2005 OASF contributed a further £20,000 towards the signing of Luke Beckett on loan from Sheffield United. And in April 2008 OASF bought a new tractor for the club groundsmen.

Over the course of its existence, OASF has donated on average £1,000 per month to Oldham Athletic.

== Patrons and directors ==
OASF currently has four patrons: Andy Ritchie, Jimmy Frizzell, David Eyres and Joe Royle and thirteen directors. Directors come up for re-election every three years.
