= Football Weekly =

Football podcast by The Guardian

- Genre: Sports
- Language: English

Cast and voices
- Hosted by: Max Rushden (2017–present); James Richardson (2006–2017)

Publication
- Original release: 2006
- Provider: The Guardian

Related
- Website: theguardian.com/football/series/footballweekly

Football Weekly is a podcast about football produced by The Guardian newspaper in the United Kingdom. It was first broadcast in 2006. It reviews the latest football results and news, and previews forthcoming matches. While focused on the Premier League and English football more broadly, the show pays significant attention to football across Europe, paying particular attention to La Liga, Serie A and the Bundesliga.

Originally provided weekly—as its name suggests—Football Weekly, as of 2021, broadcasts three times a week during the European football season. The original episode release day was Monday, after the weekend's fixtures, and since 2007 a second weekly podcast, Football Weekly Extra, has aired on Thursdays to review midweek action and preview the next weekend's matches. A third weekly episode published on Tuesdays or Wednesdays has been produced since June 2020, typically either focusing on news from non-British European leagues, or providing space for extended discussions of particular topics.

== History ==
The podcast began on 11 May 2006 as The World Cup Show, produced daily throughout the 2006 World Cup, and returned during the season under its new name on 29 August 2006, due to popular demand. During European Championships and World Cups, the podcast has aired daily.

The show was originally presented by James Richardson, with contributions by various Guardian journalists and freelance correspondents, most regularly Barry Glendenning. Richardson and journalist Iain Macintosh left in July 2017 for a new rival podcast, The Totally Football Show. Richardson was replaced by Max Rushden.

Rushden explains that the show "ranges from proper analysis of what has happened on the pitch in the UK and around Europe, to commentary about serious issues off it, balanced with some complete nonsense." Speaking in the wake of the 2018 World Cup, the Guardian's head of sport called the podcast "a brand leader despite plenty of opposition including from the BBC. It is one of our greatest multimedia successes." Since the late 2010s, the programme has paid greater attention to women's football, giving more frequent segments and occasional dedicated episodes to the women's game.

== Awards ==
In April 2008 Football Weekly was nominated for Sports Programme of the Year in the annual Sony Radio Academy Awards – the UK's main national radio awards. In 2018 the Football Supporters' Federation awarded Football Weekly the Podcast of the Year for the second year running and the fifth time in the last six years. Esquire called the show "one of the big beasts of football podcasting".

== Regular panellists ==
- Max Rushden (host)
- Barry Glendenning
- Philippe Auclair
- Nicky Bandini
- Nick Ames
- John Brewin
- Simon Burnton
- Faye Carruthers
- Jonathan Fadugba
- Ben Fisher
- Nedum Onuoha
- Jamie Jackson
- Jordan Jarrett-Bryan
- Mark Langdon
- Jonathan Liew
- Sid Lowe
- Ed Aarons
- Ewan Murray
- Barney Ronay
- Archie Rhind-Tutt
- Lars Sivertsen
- Jacob Steinberg
- Robyn Cowen
- Jonathan Wilson
- Suzy Wrack

Other occasional contributors include Jim Burke, Andy Hunter, Gregg Bakowski, Sean Ingle, Louise Taylor, Anne-Marie Batson, Elis James, Jacqui Oatley, Paul Doyle, Rory Smith, Paul MacInnes. James, Oatley and Carruthers are occasional guest hosts in the absence of Rushden, while MacInnes is a previous guest host of the show.

Lowe, Rhind-Tutt and Wrack will typically only appear to discuss matters pertaining to, respectively, Spanish, German and women's football. While also appearing on regular shows, in podcasts specifically themed around European football, Auclair and Bandini are the respective regular experts on the French and Italian game.

== Former panellists ==
- James Richardson (former host)
- Duncan Alexander
- John Ashdown
- Andy Brassell
- Michael Cox
- James Dart
- Musa Okwonga
- Fernando Duarte (Brazilian football expert)
- Owen Gibson
- Michael Hann
- Raphael Honigstein (German football expert)
- James Horncastle
- Ryan Hunn
- Amy Lawrence
- Flo Lloyd-Hughes
- Tom Lutz
- Iain Macintosh
- Kevin McCarra
- "Jaunty" Ian McCourt
- Marcela Mora y Araujo (Argentinian football expert)
- Scott Murray
- Pedro Pinto
- Leander Schaerlaeckens (Dutch football and US football expert)
- Matt Scott
- Rob Smyth
- Troy Townsend

== Former guest hosts ==
- Rob Curling
- Ken Early
- Dave Farrar
- Nat Coombs
- Melissa Rudd
- Robyn Cowen
