= Set Piece Menu =

British football podcast

Set Piece Menu is a British podcast about association football in which Andy Hinchcliffe, Rory Smith, Hugh Ferris and Steven Wyeth discuss stand alone football issues over a meal such as lunch or dinner, amongst others.

The premise of the show is to provide a deeper look into the wider issues that affect the football industry, as well as providing colourful ‘soccer stories’ from Hinchcliffe’s playing career. The podcast has been praised on Football365 for being ‘ever excellent’ and providing ‘interesting nuanced and deep discussions’.

== Awards ==
On the 31 October 2018 it was announced that Set Piece Menu Podcast has been nominated in the ‘Podcast of the Year’ category at the 2018 Football Supporters Federation Awards. Set Piece Menu was shortlisted for the Podcast of the Year at the Football Supporters' Association awards in 2020 and 2021.
