= Barry Glendenning =

Irish sports journalist (born 1973)

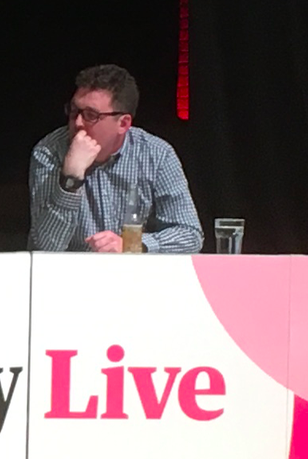
- Glendenning at Football Weekly Live
- Born: 12 March 1973 (age 53); Birr, Ireland
- Occupation: Journalist
- Known for: The Guardian, Football Weekly

Barry Glendenning (born 12 March 1973) is an Irish sports journalist who holds the position of deputy sports editor on the guardian.co.uk website run by UK newspaper The Guardian.

Glendenning was born in Birr, County Offaly and attended Cistercian College, Roscrea; then he studied for a B.A. degree at University College Dublin (UCD), which however, he did not complete.

He is named after Welsh rugby player Barry John.

== Career ==
Glendenning is currently deputy sports editor at guardian.co.uk and best known for his work on The Guardian's football podcast Football Weekly, of which Glendenning has claimed he is ‘the beating heart’. He also regularly contributes to the site's satirical daily email service, The Fiver. He is often responsible for the Guardian Unlimited "minute-by-minute reports", which feature live text coverage of Premier League, Champions League and international matches and other sports.

Glendenning can also be heard co-hosting the Warm-Up with Max Rushden on Talksport on Sunday mornings from 11am to 1pm. A particular feature of the show is the game "Culverhouse" which is a football based version of the game "Mornington Crescent" from 1970s radio show I'm Sorry I Haven't a Clue. He once recorded a TV pilot with Rushden and Paul Merson. The pilot proved unsuccessful when Rushden and Glendenning asked Merson whether he would rather have spoons for hands or forks for feet.

Glendenning has been described as having "the sexiest voice on radio" by singer Liz McClarnon.

== Controversies ==
The Guardian printed an apology in response to complaints regarding comments made by Barry in a segment about Sir Jack Hayward on a football podcast, when Hayward was described as having been "quite openly xenophobic and racist". Glendenning also later apologised for his choice of words.

== Personal life ==
Glendenning is a supporter of Sunderland A.F.C. His father, Sam, a vet, died on 23 December 2021. His father ate apples using a knife to cut small portions off the apple to put into his mouth, to avoid inconveniencing others by loudly crunching on the apple.

Glendenning is co-owner of Lewes F.C.

In June 2025, Glendenning attended Football Weekly colleague Jonathan Wilson's wedding in Newcastle. While there, he ate a black pudding, describing it as the best thing he had ever eaten.

Glendenning ran the 2026 London Landmarks Half-Marathon in a time of 2 hours and 46 minutes, raising over £100,000 for the Great Ormond Street Hospital Children's Charity.

== See also ==
- Max Rushden
- Jonathan Wilson
- Barney Ronay
