= Rory Smith =

Rory Smith may refer to:

- Rory Smith (journalist), journalist of The New York Times
- Rory Smith (lacrosse) (born 1987), Canadian professional lacrosse player
