= When Saturday Comes =

British independent football magazine

- September 2008 front cover, featuring Cristiano Ronaldo, Emmanuel Adebayor and Frank Lampard
- Editor: Andy Lyons
- Categories: Sport
- Frequency: Monthly
- Circulation: 12,365
- Publisher: Richard Guy
- First issue: March 1986 (40 years ago)
- Company: When Saturday Comes Ltd
- Country: United Kingdom
- Language: English
- Website: www.wsc.co.uk

When Saturday Comes (WSC) is a British independent monthly magazine about association football. Founded in 1986 as a fanzine, it developed into a nationally distributed monthly magazine within two years.

The magazine emerged from the British football fanzine movement of the 1980s and has retained an emphasis on football from the perspective of supporters rather than clubs, governing bodies or the football industry. Its articles combine reporting and commentary with humour, satire and coverage of the social, political and cultural aspects of the game.

WSC has been identified by journalists and academics as influential in the development of modern British sports journalism and supporter culture. Contemporary academic work on football fanzines treated WSC and the emerging supporter movement as examples of supporters challenging established representations and structures within football, while later research has credited the magazine with helping to establish a knowledgeable, humorous and sometimes political form of football writing which influenced the wider national discussion of the sport.

WSC is edited by Andy Lyons, who developed the magazine with founder Mike Ticher during its early years. Ffion Thomas is deputy editor.

== History ==
=== Origins and the fanzine movement ===
When Saturday Comes was launched in March 1986. It originated as an offshoot of the music fanzine Snipe, which was produced from a small press in Upper Clapton, east London. The first issue of WSC was distributed free with an issue of Snipe. Journalist Mike Ticher conceived the magazine, with Andy Lyons becoming involved during its early development.

The magazine appeared during a difficult period for football in England. The Bradford City stadium fire and Heysel Stadium disaster had occurred in 1985, English clubs had been banned from European competition, and football hooliganism had contributed to a hostile public and political perception of football supporters. Lyons later recalled that football was often regarded as a law-and-order problem rather than as an important part of popular culture.

WSC sought to provide an alternative to this portrayal by presenting football from a supporter's perspective. Unlike most contemporary football fanzines, which were produced for supporters of individual clubs, WSC covered the game more broadly. It combined discussion of matches and clubs with supporter issues, humour, politics and wider popular culture.

Within two years, it had developed from a bimonthly, photocopied and hand-stapled fanzine into a monthly magazine distributed nationally.

WSC also publicised the large number of club fanzines that appeared during the late 1980s, regularly carrying a directory of their titles and contact details. The magazine has subsequently described itself as part of a movement in which hundreds of independent club publications emerged, with combined sales estimated at more than one million copies a year by 1989.

=== Supporter campaigning ===
The growth of WSC coincided with the emergence of organised campaigns intended to give football supporters a greater voice in the running and regulation of the game. The magazine opposed the government's proposed compulsory identity-card scheme for football supporters and covered other supporter campaigns during the period.

A 1991 study in The Sociological Review discussed football fanzines, including When Saturday Comes, alongside the newly established Football Supporters' Association. The authors argued that the fanzine and supporter movements allowed supporters to express perspectives that had largely been excluded from mainstream representations of football and described them as a form of "cultural contestation" over the sport and its institutions.

Following the Hillsborough disaster in 1989, WSC was critical of the treatment and representation of football supporters. Its June 1989 cover showed representatives of the football authorities, police and government each denying responsibility before showing supporters with the caption "Oh well it must be our fault again". The magazine subsequently supported campaigns for justice for those affected by the disaster.

Writing in The Guardian in 2011, Barney Ronay described the magazine as having consistently supported supporter campaigning, from opposition to government policies towards fans in the 1980s through to criticism of the financial management and commercialisation of the modern game.

=== Growth and national publication ===
During the early 1990s, WSC increased its profile through both domestic and international coverage. The magazine organised trips connected with the 1992 African Cup of Nations in Senegal and subsequent African tournaments, as well as the 1993 Copa América in Ecuador.

The magazine expanded to 48 pages and moved to full-colour printing in 1995.

Its circulation peaked at more than 30,000 copies per issue in the mid-1990s, during a wider expansion in football publishing following the creation of the Premier League. Unlike a number of commercially backed football magazines launched during the period, WSC remained independently owned.

The magazine's editorial emphasis also changed as football itself became increasingly prominent in British popular culture. Whereas its early issues had defended football supporters against the marginalisation of the sport, later coverage became more concerned with commercialisation, television, club ownership and the growing economic power of elite football.

=== Later development ===
In 2016, to mark its 30th anniversary and 350th issue, WSC launched a searchable digital archive containing every issue published since 1986.

In 2019, amid declining newsagent sales, reduced advertising income and increasing print and distribution costs, the magazine launched the WSC Supporters' Club, a reader-funded membership scheme. WSC had also stopped accepting advertising from gambling companies, which it said had resulted in a substantial loss of advertising income.

By 2026, more than 450 issues had been published. The magazine's 2026 media information reported an average monthly circulation of 12,365, of which all copies were actively purchased and 80 per cent were distributed to subscribers.

== Editorial approach and influence ==
From its foundation, WSC positioned itself as an alternative to conventional football reporting. Its model was based on contributions by supporters and freelance writers rather than primarily on access to players, managers and clubs. The magazine continues to commission both professional journalists and amateur writers, including supporters writing about their own clubs and experiences.

A 2006 profile in The Guardian described the magazine's approach as "bottom up" football journalism and reported that senior newspaper sports editors regarded its supporter's-eye perspective as having influenced mainstream coverage. Guardian sports editor Ben Clissitt said that it had changed reporting of football by introducing the type of conversations supporters had after matches into newspaper coverage, while sports editors at the Daily Mail and The Independent also credited it with changing the portrayal of football supporters.

Ronay has similarly argued that the magazine's importance was less a matter of direct commercial expansion than its wider influence on football writing. In a 2011 retrospective he wrote that the fanzine culture popularised by WSC helped establish a style combining humour, critical scrutiny of football institutions and references to other areas of popular culture. A 2016 retrospective linked the magazine and the wider fanzine movement to the subsequent growth of football blogs, fan websites and more politicised forms of football commentary.

In 2019, Ronay described WSC as the only independent national football magazine to have survived the sport's major commercial expansion. He also highlighted its early coverage of subjects that later became prominent in mainstream football journalism, including institutional racism, the politics and governance of international football, and gambling's relationship with the sport.

A 2021 Guardian history of the relationship between football and British popular culture identified the emergence of WSC in 1986 as an important point in bringing football fanzine culture into the mainstream. Football historian David Goldblatt described its arrival as part of a change in the language and sensibility through which football was discussed.

The magazine has also continued to be discussed in academic studies of football culture. A study published in the European Journal of Cultural Studies described WSC as having pioneered knowledgeable, humorous and occasionally political football writing and argued that its supporter-centred approach helped shape a sports media culture in which supporters were treated as knowledgeable participants rather than simply consumers.

These assessments place WSC within a broader change in English football culture beginning in the 1980s, in which independent fanzines and organisations such as the Football Supporters' Association created new outlets for supporter opinion at a time when supporters had comparatively little representation within the mainstream media or football's governing structures.

== Contributors ==
WSC has traditionally combined articles by football supporters with work by professional writers and journalists. Its open-submission model remains part of its editorial policy, and the magazine states that amateur and first-time writers are considered alongside established journalists.

A number of writers who later became prominent in British sports journalism published early work in the magazine. These include David Conn, Barney Ronay and Harry Pearson. Ronay later worked for the magazine before becoming a senior sports writer and columnist at The Guardian.

Other notable writers to have contributed include Nick Hornby, John Peel and Mark E. Smith. Hornby's contributions pre-dated the publication of his football memoir Fever Pitch, which became one of the best-known books associated with the changing cultural status of English football during the 1990s.

Comedian and television presenter Josh Widdicombe contributed numerous articles and reviews to WSC before becoming widely known as a comedian. His work for the magazine included historical season reviews, features on lower-league football and book reviews.

Andy Burnham, who became Prime Minister of the United Kingdom in July 2026, also wrote for the magazine. In December 1997, while working in politics but before entering Parliament, Burnham contributed an article about proposals to move Everton F.C. from Goodison Park. Burnham later founded Supporters Direct, an organisation promoting supporter involvement and ownership of football clubs; Supporters Direct subsequently merged with the Football Supporters' Federation to form the present-day Football Supporters' Association. Burnham became Prime Minister on 20 July 2026.

The magazine has continued to use contributions from supporters who do not work professionally as journalists. Its annual writers' competition, established in 2012 in memory of contributor David Wangerin, is restricted to entrants who do not make their living from football writing.

== Other media ==
Alongside the print magazine, WSC operates a website containing selected articles, reviews and material from its archive. Its digital archive contains every issue from the magazine's launch in 1986 onwards.

The When Saturday Comes podcast was launched in late 2019. It features editor Andy Lyons and writer Harry Pearson with host Daniel Gray, with deputy editor Ffion Thomas contributing previews of the magazine. By 2026 the magazine reported that the podcast had reached more than 70,000 listeners.

The WSC Supporters' Club operates through Patreon, providing additional podcast episodes and other material while helping fund the magazine. In 2022, WSC also began holding live events, including events at non-League football clubhouses.

The magazine maintains a photography archive documenting football grounds, supporters and other aspects of football culture, and publishes a weekly email newsletter.
