= Hugh Ferris (presenter) =

British sport presenter

Hugh Ferris is an English television, radio, podcast and events presenter specialising in sports broadcasting, and author.

== Early life and education ==
Ferris attended King Edward VI School, Southampton, and graduated with a BA in music from York University. Ferris played the trumpet and performed as a schoolboy musician at the Royal Albert Hall.

== Career ==
Ferris has appeared on BBC TV, presenting the sport on the BBC News Channel, BBC Breakfast and BBC World News, and on radio for BBC Radio 5 Live including presenting Sports Report and The Monday Night Club, amongst others. Ferris has contributed on BBC Radio 2 to the Chris Evans Breakfast Show, and the World Service including Sportsworld, which is broadcast to more than 40 million people. At the London Olympics and 2012 Summer Paralympics Ferris presented at the sold-out London Velodrome and also to an 80,000-strong crowd at the Olympic Stadium, and anchored the World Service's Rio 2016 coverage from the BBC Sport Centre in Salford. Ferris has also presented events such as award ceremonies charity events and evenings with prestigious guests such as Shane Warne.

Ferris has a weekly football podcast called Set Piece Menu with football commentator Steven Wyeth, football journalist Rory Smith and former England international Andy Hinchcliffe, in which the four debate a single issue within association football over food. The podcast was nominated for Podcast of the Year at the 2018 Football Supporters Federation awards.

Ferris was co-writer for footballer Nedum Onuoha’s autobiography “Kicking Back”, released in May 2022 by Biteback Publishing.

== Personal life ==
Ferris has been based in Manchester through choice since working at the 2002 Commonwealth Games. He is married to Gemma, who works in supply chain project management.
