= Paul Doyle (journalist) =

Irish sportswriter

Paul Doyle is an Irish sportswriter for the British newspaper The Guardian. He was the chief sports writer for guardian.co.uk, the paper's website but has not written for the paper since 2022, according to his profile on the website. He has often appeared on the Guardian Podcast Football Weekly, hosted by Max Rushden, where he often gives updates on the latest news in French and African football. He covered the 2008 Africa Cup of Nations for The Guardian. Paul Doyle also writes on occasion for football publications such as When Saturday Comes. Paul was formerly a sports reporter for The Irish Times website.

Paul Doyle was nominated for the 2007 Sports Journalists' Association 'Internet Sportswriter of the Year'.

== See also ==
- The Fiver
