= Home advantage =

Advantage a team has playing in home venue

In team sports, the term home advantage – also called home ground, home field, home court, home ice or defender's advantage – describes the benefit that the home team is said to gain over the visiting team. This benefit has been attributed to the psychological effects supporting fans have on the competitors or referees, psychological or physiological advantages of playing near home in familiar situations, disadvantages away teams suffer from changing time zones or climates, or rigors of travel, and, in some sports, specific rules that favor home teams, whether directly or indirectly. In baseball and cricket in particular, the difference may also be the result of the home team having been assembled to take advantage of the idiosyncrasies of the home ballpark/ground, such as the distances to the outfield walls/boundaries; most other sports are played in standardized venues.

The term is also widely used in "best-of" playoff formats (e.g., best-of-seven) as being given to the team that is scheduled to play one more game at home than their opponent if all necessary games are played.

In many sports, such designations may also apply to games played at a neutral site, as the rules of various sports make different provisions for home and visiting teams. In baseball, for instance, the visiting team always bats first in each inning. Therefore, one team must be chosen to be the "visitor" when games are played at neither team's home field. Likewise, there are uncommon instances in which a team playing a game at their home venue is officially the "visiting" team, and their opponent officially the "home" team, such as when a game originally scheduled to play at one venue must be postponed and is later resumed at the other team's venue.

== Advantages ==
In most team sports, the home or hosting team is considered to have a significant advantage over the away or visiting team. Due to this, many important games (such as playoff or elimination matches) in many sports have special rules for determining what match is played where. In association football, matches with two legs, one game played in each team's "home", are common, with the team hosting the second leg having this home-field advantage. It is also common to hold important games, such as the Super Bowl, at a neutral site in which the location is determined years in advance. In many team sports in North America (including baseball, basketball, and ice hockey), playoff series are often held with a nearly equal number of games at each team's site. However, as it is usually beneficial to have an odd number of matches in a series (to prevent ties), the final home game is often awarded to the team that had more success over the regular season.

An example is UEFA Champions League, UEFA Europa League and UEFA Europa Conference League home and away legs, with weaker teams often beating the favorites when playing at home. The World Cup victories of Uruguay (1930), Italy (1934), England (1966), Germany (1974), Argentina (1978) and France (1998) are all in part attributed to the fact that the World Cup was held in the winner's country. A 2006 study by The Times found that in the English Premiership, a home team can be expected to score 37.29% more goals than the away team, though this changes depending on the quality of the teams involved. Others have suggested that the increase in British medals during the 2012 Olympics may have been impacted by home court advantage. (However, having home court did not help Canada at the 1976 Montreal Olympics, the only Summer Games at which the hosting country failed to win a single gold medal.)

The strength of the home advantage varies for different sports, regions, seasons, and divisions. For all sports, it seems to be strongest in the early period after the creation of a new league. The effect seems to have become somewhat weaker in some sports in recent decades.

Richard Adams and Susan Kupper described home-field advantage as an expertise deficiency. They demonstrated that, in theory and in practice, home-field advantage decreases as superiority of performance increases. They also showed that home-field advantage is not applicable for no-hit major league baseball games for pitchers who either replicated performance by winning two or more no-hitters or amassed a large number of career wins. Their general finding was that home-field advantage is a metric for the inability to maintain performance independent of environment, and that this metric is inversely related to variables of expertise.

In recognition of the difficulty in winning away matches, cup competitions in association football often invoke the away goals rule. Away goals can also sometimes be used to separate teams level on points and goal difference in league competitions.

=== Causes ===
==== Factors related to the location and the venue ====
There are many causes that attribute to home advantage, such as crowd involvement (for instance a 2024 study on ice hockey results during COVID-19, where no spectators were allowed at matches), travel considerations, and environmental factors. The most commonly cited factors of home advantage are usually factors which are difficult to measure and so even their existence is debated. Most of these are psychological in nature: the home teams are familiar with the playing venue, they can stay in their homes rather than a hotel, they don’t have to travel as far before the game, and they have the psychological support of the home fans.

Other factors, however, are easier to detect and can have noticeable effects on the outcome of the game. In American football, for instance, the crowd often makes as much noise as it can when the visiting team is about to run a play. That can make it very difficult for the visiting team's quarterback to call audible play changes, or for any player to hear the snap count. In contrast, the crowd is often quiet while the home team is on offense, and that enables the quarterback to use the hard count intended to draw the defense offsides as the defense can hear the hard count. In basketball, when a visiting player is making a free throw, home fans behind the backboard typically wave their arms or other objects in an attempt to break the visiting player's focus on making the shot. Environmental factors such as weather and altitude are easy to measure, yet their effects are debatable. Both teams have to play in the same conditions, but the home team may be more acclimated to local conditions with difficult environments, including possible effects from extreme temperatures and high altitude (such as the case of Denver teams, as well as the Mexico national football team, many of whose home matches are played in Mexico City, and even the Bolivian national team, which most often plays home contests in La Paz).

The stadium or arena will typically be filled with home supporters, who are sometimes described as being as valuable as an extra player for the home team. The home fans can sometimes create a psychological lift by cheering loudly for their team when good things happen in the game. The home crowd can also intimidate visiting players by booing, whistling, or heckling. Generally, the home fans vastly outnumber the visiting team's supporters. While some visiting fans may travel to attend the game, home team fans will generally have better access to tickets, and easier transportation to the event, thus, in most cases, they outnumber the visitors' fans (although in local derbies and crosstown rivalries, this may not always be the case). In some sports, such as association football, sections of the stadium will be reserved for supporters of one team or the other (to prevent fan violence), but the home team's fans will have the bulk of the seating available to them. In addition, stadium/arena light shows, sound effects, fireworks, cheerleaders, and other means to enliven the crowd will be in support of the home team. Stadium announcers in many sports will emphasize their announcements of the home team's goals and lineups to excite the crowd.

Ryan Boyko, a research assistant in the Department of Psychology in the Faculty of Arts and Sciences at Harvard University, studied 5,000 English Premier League games from 1992 to 2006, to discern any officiating bias and the influence of home crowds. The data was published in the Journal of Sports Sciences and suggested that for every additional 10,000 people attending, home team advantage increased by 0.1 goals. Additionally, his study found that home teams are likely to be awarded more penalty kicks, and this is more likely with inexperienced referees.

Further, home players can be accustomed to peculiar environmental conditions of their home area. The city of Denver, being one mile (1.6 km) above sea level, has thinner air, enough so that it affects the stamina of athletes whose bodies are not used to it. Although baseball is less aerobically demanding than many other sports, high altitude affects that sport's game play in several important ways. Denver's combination of altitude and a semi-arid climate (the city averages only about 16 in/400 mm precipitation annually) allows fly balls to travel about 10% farther than at sea level, and also slightly reduces the ability of a pitcher to throw an effective breaking ball. The low humidity also causes baseballs to dry out, making it harder for pitchers to grip them and further reducing their ability to throw breaking balls. The Colorado Rockies have a very large home advantage. This anomaly has been countered with Colorado's innovative use of humidors to keep the baseballs from drying out. Denver's altitude advantage has also come into play in gridiron football; the second longest field goal in National Football League history took place in Denver, as did the longest recorded punt. The national association football team of Bolivia also enjoys the advantage of playing at high altitude: at home during World Cup qualifiers at the even more extreme 3,600 m (11,800 ft) altitude of La Paz, they have even been known to beat Brazil, a dominant team regularly ranked number one in the FIFA World Rankings. In another game played in La Paz, Bolivia beat Argentina, ranked sixth in the world, then, 6–1, on April 1, 2009, Argentina's heaviest defeat since 1958. In cricket, the condition of the pitch and the behaviour of the ball when it bounces off the pitch varies significantly in different parts of the world, and consequently, the players on the visiting team must adjust to the ball behaving in an unfamiliar way to be successful on foreign surfaces; additionally, the home team has the right to adjust the preparation of its pitches in a manner enhancing its own strengths or exacerbating its opponent's weaknesses.

The weather can also play a major factor. For example, the February average temperature minimum in Tel Aviv, Israel is 50 °F (10 °C), while the average at the same time in Kazan, Russia is 10 °F (−12 °C), with snow being common. This means that when Rubin Kazan played at home against Hapoel Tel Aviv in the 2009-10 UEFA Europa League, Hapoel needed to acclimatize, and were therefore at a disadvantage. Hapoel duly lost the match 3–0. However, a home stadium subject to frequent inclement weather can be a burden on the home team: the Buffalo Bills, whose home stadium (Highmark Stadium) is subject to high and unpredictable winds, and lake-effect snow in the late fall and early winter, regularly suffer large numbers of injuries late in the season, and the Bills have had to cancel practices due to the weather. A study, published in the Orthopedic Journal of Sports Medicine and reported by Forbes in 2016, analyzed NFL injury reports from 2012-2014 and found that players had a two-fold greater risk of concussions and a 1.5 times greater risk of ankle injuries in games played at 50 °F (10 °C) or colder compared to games at 70 °F (21 °C) or warmer.

Sometimes the unique attributes of a stadium create a home-field advantage. The unique off-white Teflon-coated roof of the Hubert H. Humphrey Metrodome trapped and reflected noise to such an extent that it was distracting or even harmful. This, combined with the color of the roof, caused opposing baseball players to commit more errors in the Dome than in other ballparks. While this is no longer an issue for opponents of the Minnesota Twins with that team's 2010 move to the open-air Target Field, it remained important to the many college baseball teams that played games in the Dome until its late 2013 closing. Hard Rock Stadium, the home stadium of the NFL's Miami Dolphins, is designed in such a way, following renovations, that when the sun is overhead, the home sideline is in the shade while the visitors sideline is directly in the sun's path. This, combined with the hot tropical climate South Florida receives, can lead to differences of up to 30 °F (17 °C) or more between the two sidelines, with the visiting sideline temperature getting as high as 120 °F (49 °C). The parquet floor at the Boston Celtics' former home of Boston Garden contained many defects, which were said to give the Celtics, who were more likely to be familiar with the playing surface, an advantage. During the 1985–1986 season, the Larry Bird-led Celtics posted a home court record of 40–1; this record (later tied by the 2015-2016 San Antonio Spurs) still stands in the NBA. They later went 10–0 at home in playoffs, making it 50–1 at home. Memorial Gymnasium, the venue for men's and women's basketball at Vanderbilt University, was built in 1952 with the team benches at the ends of the court instead of along one of the sidelines, a setup that was not unusual at the time. However, the configuration is now unique in U.S. major-college sports, and has been said to give the Commodores an edge, because opposing coaches are not used to directing their teams from the baselines. Cherry Hill Arena, a New Jersey–based arena in the southern suburbs of Philadelphia, had a number of idiosyncrasies that its home teams used to their advantage, but earned the arena an extremely poor reputation, overall, including a slanted ice surface that forced opponents to skate the majority of the game uphill, and lack of showers for the visiting team.

Sports Illustrated, in a 17 January 2011 article, reported that home crowds, rigor of travel for visiting teams, scheduling, and unique home field characteristics were not factors in giving home teams an advantage. The journal concluded it was favorable treatment by game officials and referees that conferred advantages on home teams. They stated that sports officials are unwittingly and psychologically influenced by home crowds, and that is significant enough to affect the outcomes of sporting events in favor of home teams.

Other research has found that crowd support, travel fatigue, geographical distance, pitch familiarity, and referee bias do not have a strong effect when each factor is considered alone, suggesting that it is the combination of several different factors that creates the overall home advantage effect. An evolutionary psychology explanation for the home advantage effect refers to observed behavioral and physiological responses in animals when they are defending their home territory against intruders. This causes a rise in aggression and testosterone levels in the defenders. A similar effect has been observed in football with testosterone levels being significantly higher in home games than in away games. Goalkeepers, the last line of defense, have particularly strong testosterone changes when playing against a bitter rival as compared to a training season. How testosterone may influence results is unclear but may include cognitive effects such as motivation and physiological effects such as reaction time.

An extreme example of home advantage was the 2013 Nigeria Premier League; each of the 20 teams lost at most 3 of 19 home matches and won at most 3 of 19 away matches. Paul Doyle ascribed this to visiting teams' facing "violent crowds, questionable refereeing and [...] [a]rriving just before kick-off after long road trips, often on hazardous surfaces".

The 2020–21 NHL season saw major disruption due to COVID-19-restricted conditions that resulted in bubble playoffs and ghost games, as fans were unable to attend in person. New research has shown that this led to a significant drop to home advantage compared with the previous six seasons. In 592 games played under the restricted conditions through March, home teams suffered a decline of 10%, while road teams’ win rates increased by 7%.

==== Factors related to the game rules ====
In a number of sports, the hosting team has the advantage of playing with their first choice uniforms, while the visiting team wears their alternative away/road colors. Some sports leagues simply state that the team wears its away uniforms only when its primary jerseys would clash with the colors of the home team, while other leagues mandate that visiting teams must always wear their away colors regardless. However, sometimes teams wear their alternative uniforms by choice. This is especially true in North American sports where generally one uniform is white or grey, and "color vs. color" games (e.g., blue vs. red uniforms) are a rarity, having been discouraged in the era of black-and-white television. Many teams from warm-weather cities may wear their white uniforms at home, forcing their opponent to wear dark uniforms in the hot weather. An exception is a rule in high school American football (except Texas, which plays by NCAA football rules), requiring the home team to wear dark jerseys and the visiting team to wear white jerseys, which may work as a disadvantage to the home team in hot-weather games.

In ice hockey, there are at least three distinct rule-related advantages for the home team. The first is referred to as "last change", where during stoppages of play, the home team is allowed to make player substitutions after the visiting team does (unless the home team ices the puck, in which case no substitutions are allowed). This allows the home team to obtain favorable player matchups. This rule makes the home team designation important even in games played on neutral ice. Traditionally, the second advantage was that when lining up for the face-off, the away team's centre always had to place his stick on the ice before the centre of the home team. However, in both the NHL and international rule sets, this now applies only for face-offs at the centre-ice spot; when a face-off takes place anywhere else on the ice, the defending centre has to place his stick first. The centre who is allowed to place his stick last gains the ability to time the face-off better and gives him greater odds of winning it. The third advantage is that the home team has the benefit of choosing whether to take the first or second attempt in a shootout.

In baseball, the home team – which bats in the bottom half of each inning – enjoys the advantage of being able to end the game immediately if it has the lead in the ninth inning (or other scheduled final inning) or in extra innings. If the home team is leading at the end of the top half of the ninth inning, the game ends without the bottom half being played. If the home team is trailing or the score is tied in the bottom half of the ninth inning or any extra inning, the game ends immediately if the home team takes the lead; the visiting team does not get another opportunity to score, and the home team does not have to protect its lead. On the other hand, if the visiting team has the lead when the top half of the ninth inning or extra inning ends, the home team still gets an opportunity to score and so the visiting team must protect its lead. In addition, in the late innings, the home team knows how many runs it needs to win or tie, and can therefore strategize accordingly. For example, in a tie game in the ninth inning or extra innings, the home team may employ strategies such as bunting or stealing bases, which oftentimes increase the chances of scoring one run, but decrease the chances of scoring multiple runs.

Additionally in baseball, the host team is familiar with the unique dimensions of their home field yielding them advantages (pitching, hitting, fielding) over visiting teams. Before the Major League Baseball labor agreement that ended the 2021–22 lockout saw the designated hitter added permanently in the National League, the home league's rules concerning the designated hitter (DH) were followed during interleague games, including the World Series. This put AL teams at a disadvantage when they played in NL parks, as AL pitchers were typically not used to batting or baserunning. NL teams at AL parks were at a disadvantage because players who did not play often had to bat an entire game, usually on consecutive nights. The NL team's DH was a pinch-hitter who batted perhaps once every few games during the season, or alternated in a platoon system with other players (such as a catcher who does not start because the starting pitcher uses the other catcher), while the AL team's DH batted multiple times per game throughout the season.

=== Measuring and comparing of home-field advantage ===
Comparison of home advantage in European top-level football leagues between the 2007/2008 and 2016/2017 seasons. Method is based on Jeffrey Divergence and the procedure is described in detail in Marek and Vávra (2020). The final components of graph show leagues with similar home advantages.

Measuring the home-field advantage of a team (in a league with balanced schedule) requires a determination of the number of opponents for which the result at home-field was better ($k_1$), same ($k_0$), and worse ($k_{-1}$). Goals scored and conceded – in so called combined measure of home team advantage – are used to determine which results are better, same, and which are worse. Given two results between teams $T_1$ and $T_2$, $h_{T_1}:a_{T_2}$ played at $T_1$'s field and $h_{T_2}:a_{T_1}$played at $T_2$'s field, we can compute differences in scores (e.g. from $T_1$'s point of view): $d_{h,T_1}=h_{T_1}-a_{T_2}$and $d_{a,T_1}=a_{T_1}-h_{T_2}$. Team $T_1$ played better at home field if $d_{h,T_1}>d_{a,T_1}$, and $T_1$ played better at away field if $d_{h,T_1}<d_{a,T_1}$ (for example, if Arsenal won 3–1 at home against Chelsea, i.e. $d_{h,Arsenal}=2$, and Arsenal won 3–0 at Chelsea, i.e. $d_{a,Arsenal}=3$, then the result for Arsenal at home was worse). Same approach has to be used for all opponents in one season to obtain $k_1$, $k_0$, and $k_{-1}$.

Values of $k_1$, $k_0$, and $k_{-1}$ are used to estimate probabilities as $\hat{p}_r=\frac{k_r+1}{K+3}, r=-1,0,1$, where $K$ is total number of opponents in a league (this is Bayesian estimator). To test hypothesis that home-field advantage is statistically significant we can compute $P(p_1>p_{-1})=1-I_{1/2}(k_1+1,k_{-1}+1)$, where $I_{1/2}()$ is incomplete gamma function. For example, Newcastle in 2015/2016 English Premier League season recorded better result at home field for 13 opponents, same result with 4 opponents, and worse result for two opponents; therefore $P(p_1>p_{-1})=1-I_{1/2}(14,3)=0.998$ and hypothesis about home team advantage can be accepted. This procedure was introduced and applied by Marek and Vávra (2017) on English Premier League seasons 1992/1993 – 2015/2016. Later, the procedure was finalised in Marek and Vávra (2020).

Marek and Vávra (2018) described procedure which allows to use observed counts of combined measure of home team advantage ($k_1$, $k_0$, and $k_{-1}$) in two leagues to be compared by the test for homogeneity of parallel samples (for the test see Rao (2002)). The second proposed approach is based on distance between estimated probability description of home team advantage in two leagues ( $\hat{p}_r=\frac{k_r}{K}, r=-1,0,1$) which can be measured by Jeffrey divergence (a symmetric version of Kullback–Leibler divergence). They tested five top level English football leagues and two top level Spanish leagues between 2007/2008 and 2016/2017 season. The main result is that home team advantage in Spain is stronger. Spanish La Liga has the strongest home team advantage, and English football league two has the lowest home team advantage, among analysed leagues.

Comparison of home advantage in 19 European football leagues between the 2007/2008 and 2016/2017 seasons was made in Marek and Vávra (2024). They found that, among the analysed leagues, the Super League Greece had the strongest home advantage and English Football League Two had the lowest home advantage.

== Gaining or losing home-field advantage ==
During the regular season for a sport, in the interest of fairness, schedulers try to ensure that each team plays an equal number of home and away games. Thus, having home-field advantage for any particular regular-season game is largely due to random chance. (This is only true for fully organized leagues with structured schedules; for a counterexample, college football schedules often have an imbalance in which the most successful and largest teams can negotiate more home appearances than mid-majors, a situation that was also prevalent in the early, disorganized years of the National Football League.)

However, in the playoffs, home advantage is usually given to the team with the higher seed (which may or may not have the better record), as is the case in the NFL, MLB, and Stanley Cup playoffs. One exception to this was MLB's World Series, which from 2003 to 2016, awarded home-field advantage to the team representing the league which won the All-Star Game that year, to help raise interest in the All-Star Game after a tie in 2002; before 2003, home-field advantage alternated each year between the National League and the American League. Starting in 2017, home-field advantage in the World Series is nowadays given to the team with the best regular season record. Home-ice advantage in the Stanley Cup Final and starting in 2014, extends to conference finals, is given to the team with the best season record. In the NBA playoffs, home-court advantage is based solely on which team has the best record (using various tiebreakers to settle the question should the teams finish with identical records).

For most championship series, such as the NBA Finals, the team with the better regular season record, regardless of seed, has home-court advantage.

Rugby union's European Rugby Champions Cup also uses a seeding system to determine home advantage in the quarterfinals (though not in the semifinals, where the nominal "home" teams are determined by a blind draw).

In many sports, playoffs consist of a 'series' of games played between two teams. These series are usually a best-of-5 or best-of-7 format, where the first team to win 3 or 4 games, respectively, wins the playoff. Since these best-of series always involve an odd number of games, it is impossible to guarantee that an equal number of games will be played at each team's home venue. As a result, the team with the better regular season record must be scheduled to have one more home game than the other. This team is said to have home-field advantage for that playoff series.

During the course of these playoff series, however, sports announcers or columnists will sometimes mention a team "gaining" or "losing" home-field advantage. This can happen after a visiting team has just won a game in the series. In playoff series format, the home-field advantage is said to exist for whichever team would win the series if all remaining games in the series are won by the home team for that game. Therefore, it is possible for a visiting team to win a game and, hence, gain home-field advantage. This is somewhat similar to the concept of losing serve in tennis.

As an example, in the 1982 NBA Finals, the Los Angeles Lakers played the Philadelphia 76ers, with the 76ers having earned home court advantage because of a better regular season record. Four games were scheduled to be played in Philadelphia, while three were scheduled in Los Angeles. If the home team were to win each game, then the 76ers would have won four games, the Lakers would have won three games, and the 76ers would have won the series, so we say that Philadelphia had the home-court advantage. However, the visiting Lakers won Game 1. Los Angeles now had one win, and there were three games remaining at each arena. The home team went on to win all of the remaining games in that series, so Los Angeles won four games, while Philadelphia won two (Game 7, which would have been played in Philadelphia, was omitted, as even if the 76ers won, they'd still lose the series 4–3). Since the Lakers won the series in this scenario, it is said that they have taken home-court advantage away from the 76ers.

In some cup competitions, (for example the FA Cup in all rounds prior to the semi-final), home advantage is determined by a random drawing. However, if the initial match is drawn (tied), home advantage for the replay is given to the other team.

== Neutral venues ==
For certain sporting events, home advantage may be removed by use of a neutral venue. This may be a national stadium that is not a home stadium to any club (for example, Wembley Stadium hosts the FA Cup Final and semi-finals). Alternatively the neutral venue may be the home stadium of another club, such as was used historically to stage FA Cup semi-finals.

The venue may also be neutral in atmosphere by order of the organizing body, with commercial advertising, either permanent or virtual, covered up or disallowed outside the sanctioning body's approved sponsors, including the venue's own naming rights, which is common in tournaments such as the UEFA Champions League and FIFA World Cup; for instance, Mercedes-Benz Stadium in Atlanta is known instead as "Atlanta Stadium", or Milan's Mediolanum Forum becomes the Forum di Milano, when ad neutrality is required.

If the venue is chosen before the start of the competition, however, it is still possible for one team to gain home field advantage. For example, in the European Cup/UEFA Champions League, there have been four instances in which a club has managed to reach the final hosted in its own stadium (1957, 1965, 1984, and 2012). Most recently Bayern Munich played (and lost) the 2012 final at their home stadium of Allianz Arena, as it was chosen as the venue in January 2010. In the Champions League Final, however, if the "home" shirt colors of both teams conflict (e.g. both are red) then there is a draw which assigns one of the teams their "away" shirt. The NFL's Super Bowl is also played in a venue chosen years in advance of the game. Super Bowl LV in 2021 was the first Super Bowl in which one of the participating teams was playing in its home stadium, as the Tampa Bay Buccaneers played at Raymond James Stadium in Tampa, Florida. The next year saw the Los Angeles Rams play Super Bowl LVI at their home of SoFi Stadium in Inglewood, California. Both games were awarded to their respective locations in 2017. Two other Super Bowls (XIV in 1980 and XIX in 1985) were played in neutral stadiums in the market area of one of the participating teams. Regardless, tickets are allocated equally between both competing teams, even if one happens to be playing in its own stadium.

Neutral-venue matches may arise out of necessity. For example, on December 12, 2010, the roof of the Minnesota Vikings' stadium, the Hubert H. Humphrey Metrodome collapsed due to a snowstorm. The Vikings were supposed to play against the New York Giants at the stadium the next day. The game was moved to the Detroit Lions' stadium, Ford Field. The following week, the Vikings' Monday Night Football game against the Chicago Bears was moved to the University of Minnesota's TCF Bank Stadium.

As part of a settlement for a 1992 strike by the NHL Players Association, the National Hockey League scheduled two neutral-site games for each team in a non-NHL market, with one as designated home team and one as the designated away team. The neutral site games ended after the 1993–94 NHL season, as the following season was lockout-shortened, and the 1995–96 NHL season reduced the regular season from 84 to 82 games per team. The NHL has held neutral-site, season-opening games in Europe (sometimes also including preseason exhibitions against European clubs), first from 2007 to 2011 as the NHL Premiere, and from 2017 as the NHL Global Series. The 2019 NHL Heritage Classic was also a neutral site game, played in the non-NHL market of Regina, Saskatchewan—falling roughly halfway between the markets of the participating teams, the Calgary Flames and Winnipeg Jets.

A requirement to play home matches at a neutral venue has been used as a punishment by UEFA for teams whose fans cause disturbances at previous matches. For example, after the violent clashes after the Turkey-Switzerland game in 2005, UEFA punished the Turkish team with playing the next six regular international home matches abroad. It is also required where one team's home location is in a war zone, at high risk of terrorism, or if the visiting team is prevented from travelling to (one of) their opponent's regular stadium(s) for political reasons. The latter consideration is uncommon, because governing bodies typically implement measures to prevent national teams from jurisdictions with the most serious political disputes (for example, Spain and Gibraltar, or Serbia and Kosovo) from being drawn in the same group, but it does happen - for example, the Ukraine–Kosovo qualifier game for the 2018 World Championships was held in Kraków, Poland, because Ukraine does not recognize Kosovo geopolitically, and thus does not admit Kosovar nationals to its territory. In all such cases, the match is still treated as a "home" match for such purposes as implementing the away goals rule.

In North America, Major League Soccer formerly hosted its MLS Cup final at neutral sites. Since 2012, the game has been held at the venue of the participating team that had the better regular season record.

== By competition ==
=== Baseball ===
In the 2018 Major League Baseball regular season, the home team won 1,277 games (52.6%), and the away team won 1,149 games (47.4%). These totals do not include the six games played at neutral sites (though all of the neutral-site games had a designated "home" team).

- The team with the best overall record, the Boston Red Sox, finished 108–54, going 57–24 at home and 51–30 away. Of their wins, 52.8% were at home, and 55.6% of their losses were on the road.
- The team with the worst record, the Baltimore Orioles, went 47–115 (28–53 at home, 19–62 away). Of their total wins, 59.6% were at home, and 53.9% of their losses were away.
- The largest differential between home and road records was that of the Philadelphia Phillies, going 48–32 at home, 31–50 away, and winning their only neutral-site game as the designated home team. Exactly 60% of their wins were in their home park, and 61.0% of their losses were on the road.
- An especially anomalous home/away split was that of the Houston Astros, whose 103–59 record was second-best in MLB. They were 11 games better on the road than at home (46–35 home, 57–24 away). Of their wins, 44.6% were at home, while 40.7% of their losses were away.

The 2019 World Series is the first 7-game series in the history of major North American sports where all seven games were won by the road team. Ironically, both finalists, the Washington Nationals and the Houston Astros, had been stronger at home than on the road in both the regular season and playoffs, until the World Series. The 2023 ALCS was the second 7-game Major League Baseball series where all seven games were won by the road team.

=== Basketball ===
In the 2018–19 NBA regular season, the home team won 729 games (59%), and the away team won 501 games (41%).

- The team with the best overall record, the Milwaukee Bucks, finished 60–22, going 33–8 at home and 27–14 away. In all, 55% of their wins were at home, and 64% of their losses were on the road.
- The Denver Nuggets had the best home record, going 34–7 at home, but went 20–21 away. This meant that 63% of their wins were at home, and 75% of their losses were away.
- The only teams with a better record on the road than at home were the Chicago Bulls and the Miami Heat, going 9–32 and 19–22 at home and 13–28 and 20–21 on the road, respectively.

=== Cricket ===
Across the 2008, 2010, and 2011 seasons of the Indian Premier League, the home team won 95 games (54.3%), and the away team won 80 games (45.7%).

=== American football ===
At least some degree of home field advantage has been recorded in almost every National Football League season; each year, designated home teams have won more games than lost. The 2020 NFL season, played in empty and near-empty stadiums, was the first in which no significant advantage was recorded: home teams that year finished 127–128–1 (.498).

=== Ice hockey ===
In the 2019 Stanley Cup playoffs, for the first time in NHL history all division winners (who had home-ice advantage) were eliminated in the first round as all the wild-cards advanced to the second round. The Columbus Blue Jackets won a playoff series for the first time, defeating the first-place Lightning in four games, and marking the first time in Stanley Cup playoff history that the Presidents' Trophy winners were swept in the opening round, and the first time since 2012 that the Presidents' Trophy winners were defeated in the opening round. They were soon followed by the Calgary Flames, who with their five-game loss to the Colorado Avalanche, ensured that for the first time in NHL history, neither of the conference number one seeds advanced to the second round. After that, the two remaining division winners, the Nashville Predators and Washington Capitals, were each eliminated in an overtime game, the Predators in six by the Dallas Stars, and the Capitals in seven by the Carolina Hurricanes.

=== Association football ===
In the 2018–19 Premier League, the home team won 181 matches (47%), the away team won 128 matches (34%), and teams drew in 71 matches (19%); however, this is considered an aberration, as home advantage has statistically been steadily declining for over a century.

- Liverpool had 30 wins, 7 draws and 1 loss. They had 57% of their wins at home, and 100% of their losses away.
- Crystal Palace in contrast had 14 wins, 7 draws and 17 losses. They had 64% of their wins away, and 53% of their losses at home.

== See also ==
- Major League Baseball (All-Star Game)
- Major League Baseball (World Series)
- Major League Baseball (postseason)
- Circadian advantage
