= Barney Ronay =

English journalist and author

Barney Ronay is an English journalist and author. He is the chief sports writer for The Guardian, and has regularly appeared on The Guardian's Football Weekly podcast and at the Football Weekly live shows. He has also written for the New Statesman, When Saturday Comes, The Cricketer, and The Blizzard.

== Early life ==
Ronay was born and raised in South East London, and is of Austrian Jewish descent. His grandparents fled during the rise of the Nazis in Austria. He was educated at Mansfield College, University of Oxford.

== Career ==
Ronay has written several books. How Football (Almost) Came Home: Adventures in Putin's World Cup was published by HarperCollins in November 2018. The Manager: The Absurd Ascent of the Most Important Man in Football, was published in 2010 and was named book of the week by The Independent, Any Chance of a Game? A Season at the Ugly End of Park Football was published in 2006. He also co-authored the WSC Companion to Football.

In 2014 Ronay was named the 29th most influential Twitter user in UK football. On 10 October 2018 Ronay was included in a list of the 238 most respected journalists working in Britain as published by the National Council for the Training of Journalists.

On 31 October 2018 it was announced that Ronay had been nominated in the ‘writer of the year’ category at the 2018 Football Supporters Federation Awards, which he subsequently won ahead of Jonathan Liew and Jonathan Northcroft amongst others. At the 2020 Sports Journalists’ Association awards Ronay was named best football journalist. Ronay and Liew collaborated on a television script called The Red Zone which was set to be shown on Netflix, executive produced by Sam Mendes. In March 2022 the project was announced as discontinued. In November 2022 he won 'writer of the year' at the Football Supporters' Association awards.

== Personal life ==
Ronay is a supporter of Millwall F.C. He was a highly influential campaigner against plans by Lewisham council that he believed could harm the club. In 2021, Ronay spoke about his life on the Guardian's Football Weekly.
