= Jimmy Frizzell =

Scottish footballer and manager

Personal information
- Full name: James Letson Frizzell
- Date of birth: 16 February 1937
- Place of birth: Greenock, Scotland
- Date of death: 3 July 2016 (aged 79)
- Place of death: Oldham, England
- Positions: Full back; forward

Senior career*
Years	Team	Apps	(Gls)
1957–1960	Greenock Morton	41	(4)
1960–1970	Oldham Athletic	318	(56)

Managerial career
- 1970–1982: Oldham Athletic
- 1986–1987: Manchester City
- * Club domestic league appearances and goals

James Letson Frizzell (16 February 1937 – 3 July 2016) was a Scottish association football player and manager.

Frizzell was appointed a patron of Oldham Athletic's supporters' trust, Trust Oldham in 2004.

== Playing career ==
Frizzell began his career at Greenock Morton as a forward in 1957. Approximately 3 years later, he joined Oldham Athletic, where he played 318 matches and scored 57 goals initially as a forward and then in the wing-half and full-back roles.

== Managerial career ==
A managerial career was started in March 1970 when Frizzell became manager of Oldham Athletic, following a spell as a coach under Jack Rowley. At the time, the club was near the bottom of Division Four, with the distinct possibility of having to re-apply for League status. He then guided the team to nine wins and six draws in the remaining 22 matches and a comfortable midtable finish. In the following season Oldham achieved promotion to Division Three and in 1974 they won the Third Division championship. The club survived in the Second Division bar only a couple of flirts with relegation, yet despite his success at the helm of the club, Frizzell was surprisingly dismissed in June 1982. He was at the time the second longest serving manager in the Football League.

After a year unemployed, Frizzell was invited to join Manchester City as an assistant to Billy McNeill. He became manager after the exit of his former boss in October 1986. Frizzell was sacked in May 1987 as the team was relegated to the Division Two under a serious financial crisis. He returned to the club in 1994 to work as chief scout but left in 1998.

== Death ==
Frizzell died on 3 July 2016.
