= Bodington Hall =

Former hall of residence at the University of Leeds

Coordinates: 53.8444°N 1.5876°W

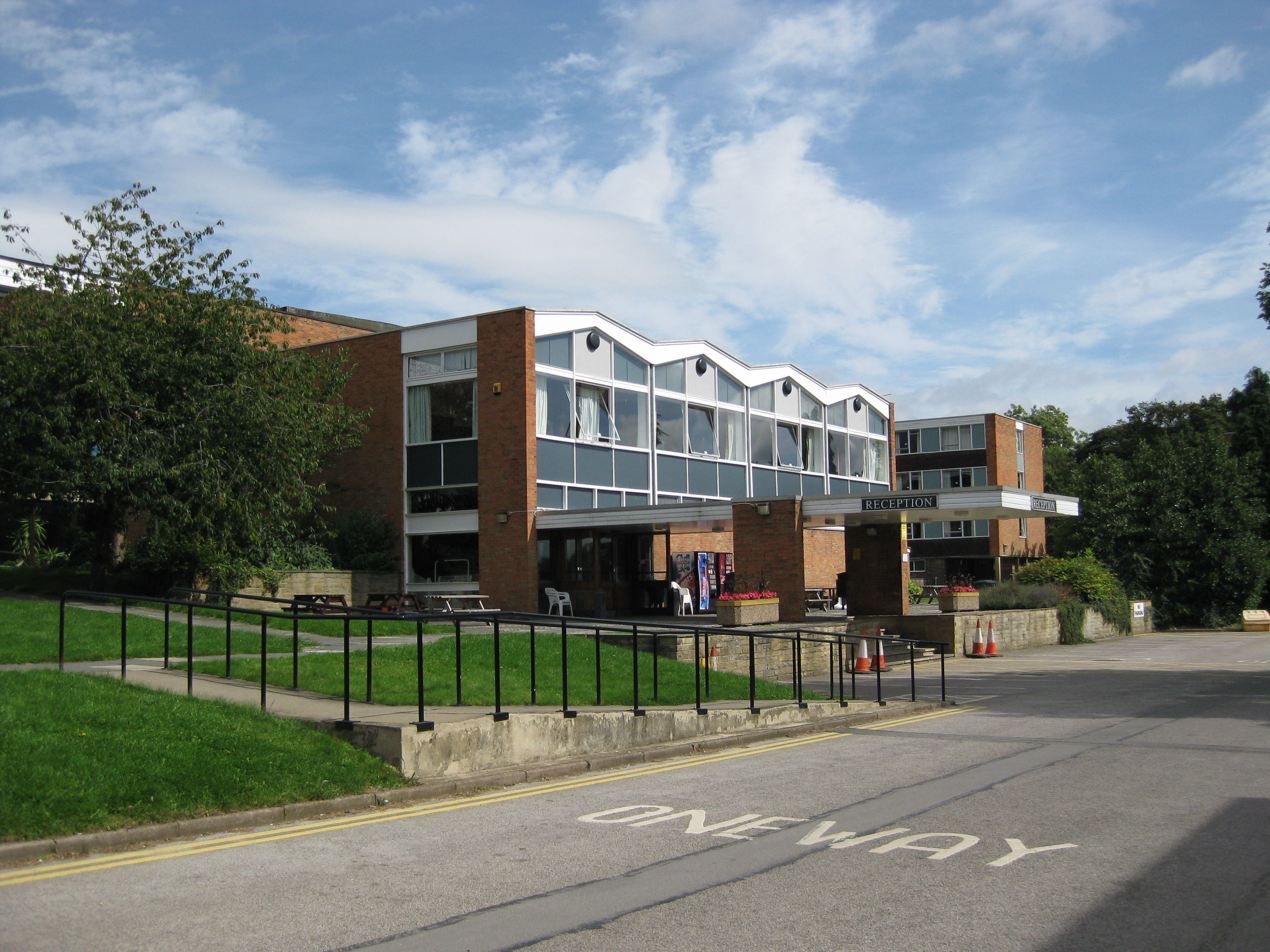
Main administrative block with reception, dining hall etc.

Bodington Hall was the largest hall of residence of the University of Leeds, in Leeds, England. It was opened in 1961 and closed in 2013. The site still contains the university's main playing fields. Known as Bod within the university, it was located between Lawnswood and Adel, approximately 4 miles north of the main campus. Bodington was used mainly to house first year undergraduate students. Out of term, it was used for conferences and sporting activities such as WorldNET, the Internet Football Association's annual tournament, and from 1994 to 2012 it was the venue for the International Medieval Congress (IMC).

The site opened in October 1961, and was completed by 1963. The following year architect Denis Mason-Jones won the Leeds Gold Medal for his design. The hall was named after Sir Nathan Bodington, the first Vice Chancellor of the university. Bodington was originally an all-male hall, with Woodsley, Vaughan and Seton Houses becoming mixed at the start of the academic year 1976 and the other five following later. For that year the Woodsley student president was Chris Snowden, later Professor Sir Christopher Snowden, vice chancellor of the University of Surrey and subsequently the University of Southampton. A large decorative panel in aluminium by the sculptor Hubert Dalwood was installed on the exterior of the refectory and was Grade II listed in 2012.

The self-catering flats were opened in September 1992.

The academic year 2011/12 was the last year that students lived a full year in the halls although a smaller group of students, including late accommodation applications and students from Clearing, were allowed to stay in the halls for the first term of 2012/13. Bodington Hall was officially closed in January 2013, and demolished to enable housing to be built on the site.

== Accommodation ==
Bodington had 640 single study bedrooms and 100 self-catering flats each of 5 bedrooms with shared facilities.

=== List of houses ===
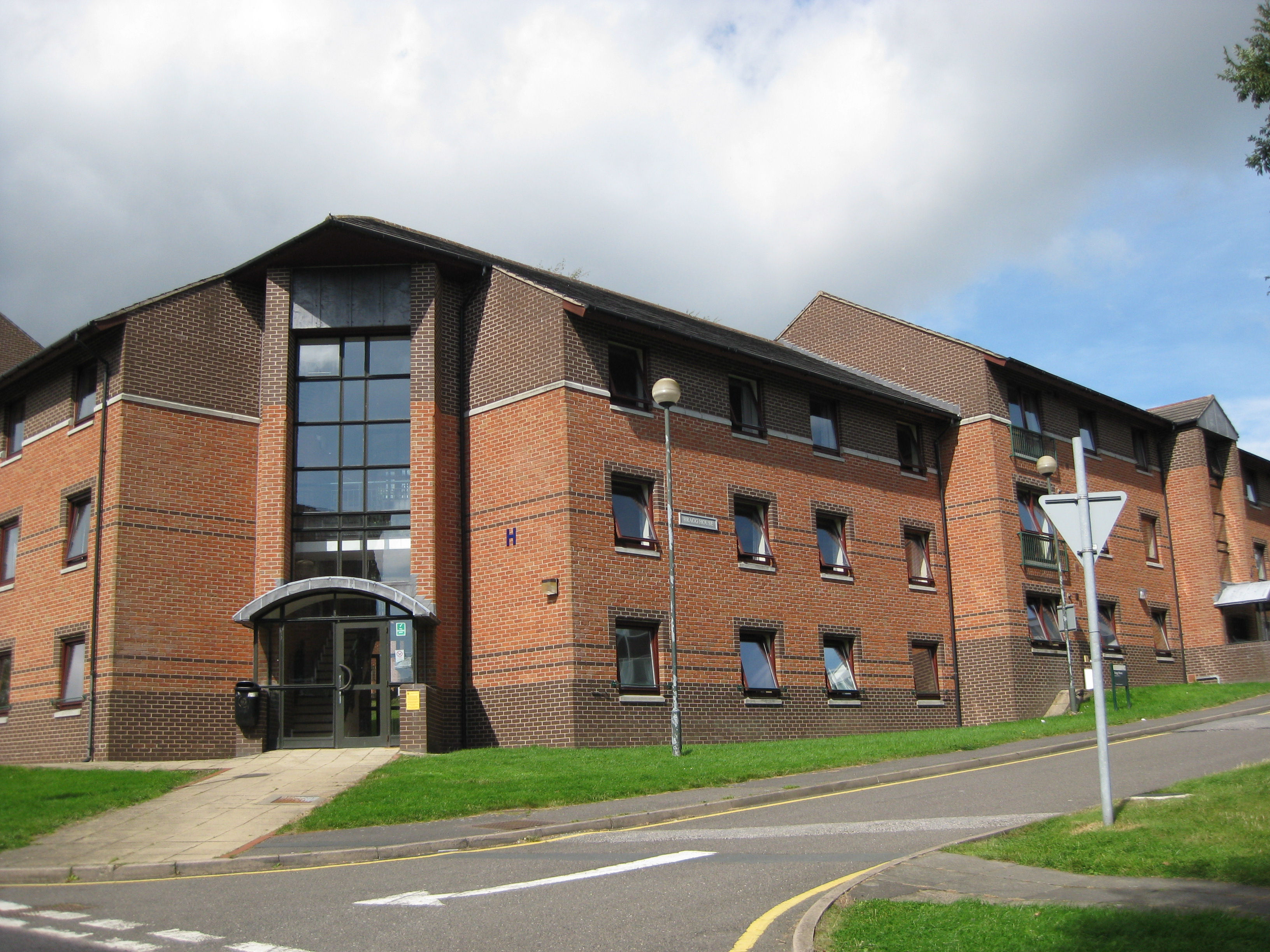
Bragg House, one of the newer blocks

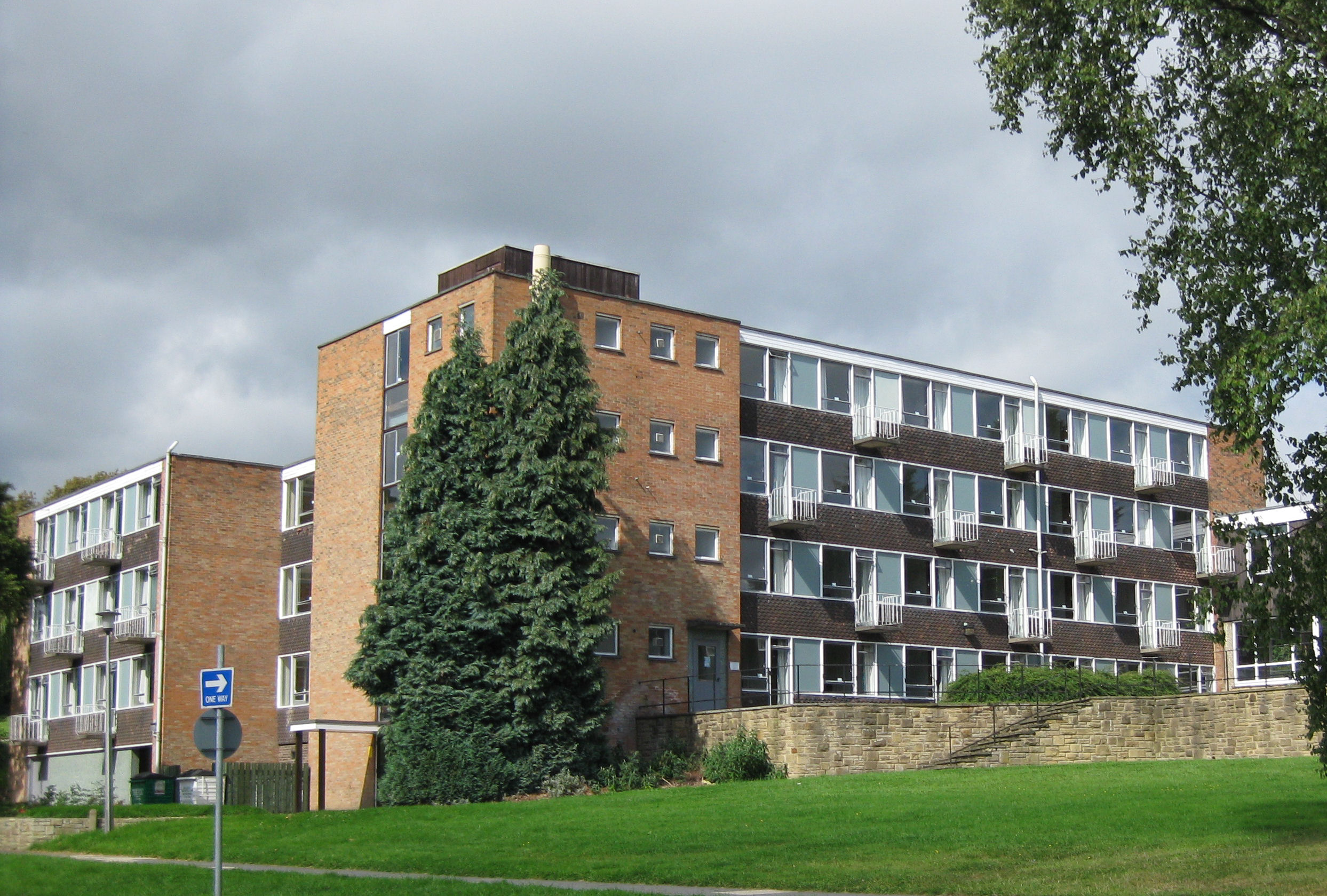
1960s style flats

==== Catered ====
- Barbier
- Centre Barbier
- Clapham
- Grant
- Hey
- Mortain
- Seton
- Vaughan
- Woodsley

==== Self-catering ====
(renamed in 1999 after former members of university staff)

- Bragg
- Evans
- Lattimore
- Mackey
- McClurkin
- Walsh
- Whewell

== Facilities ==
The site's sports facilities included squash courts, snooker room and football and rugby fields.

== Hubert Dalwood mural relief ==
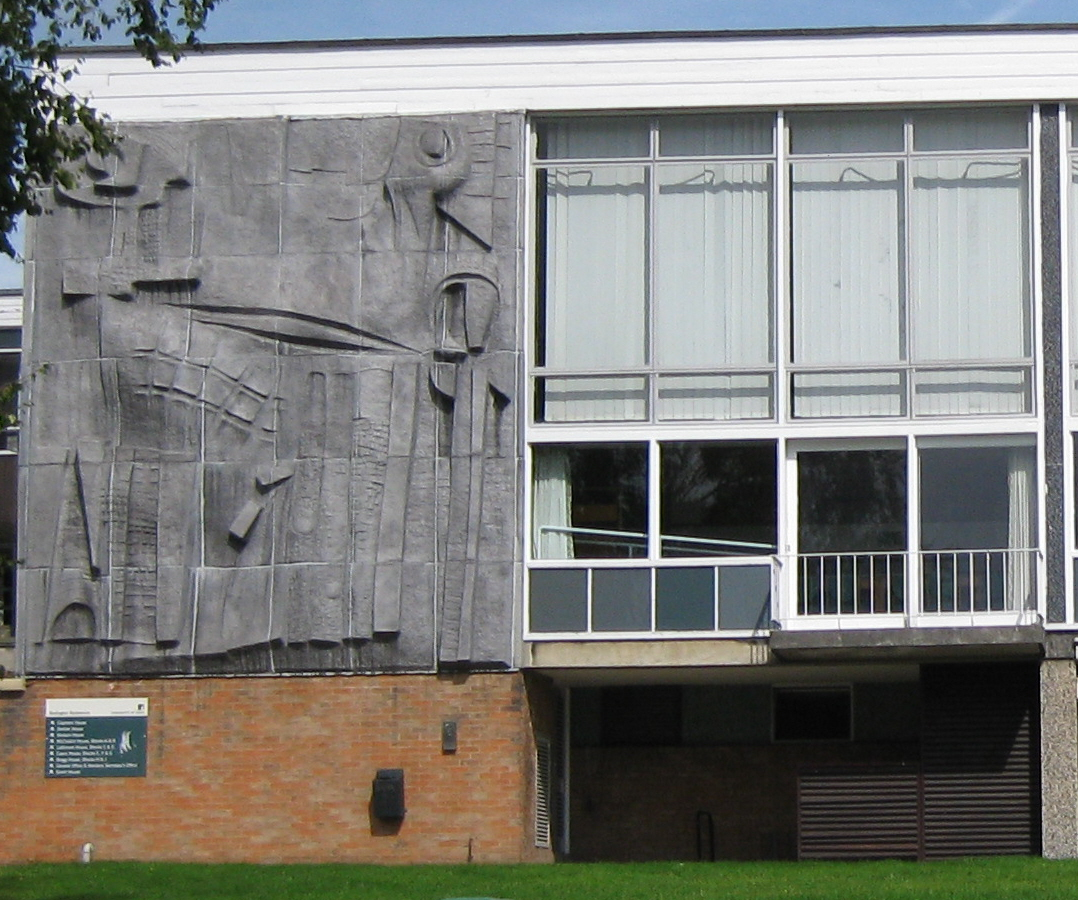
Hubert Dalwood mural, 2009

In 1959 Denis Mason-Jones of Jones & Stocks (the architects for Bodington Hall) commissioned Hubert Dalwood to create a mural relief for the refectory building of Bodington Hall. The untitled work consisting of 36 aluminum squares which form a large rectangular panel was completed and installed in 1962. It was Grade II listed in 2012 for several reasons, partly because it is the first large mural relief by Dalwood, a leading British post-war sculptor, and also because of the use of materials and aesthetic quality of the work. As an example of commissioned public artworks it was considered to be of historic interest. After the Hall was demolished in 2013 the mural was taken down and moved to the stage@leeds building on the University of Leeds campus in 2016.

== Oil spill ==
On 29 March 1999, at least 10,000 litres of fuel oil overflowed from a storage tank on the site and caused environmental damage, notably to Meanwood Beck.
