= Jordan Jarrett-Bryan =

British sports commentator

Jordan Jarrett-Bryan (born 1983) from Dulwich in South London, is a Channel 4 News sports reporter, DJ, and journalist.

Jarrett-Bryan started in journalism as editor of the youth publication, Live Magazine and then ATM Magazine. During this time he wrote freelance for magazines and newspapers including Dazed & Confused, DJ, Sunday Times, Time Out, Touch and was a youth consultant for script writers at the BBC. He has also written for The Independent and The Guardian. He can also be heard on Talksport on the TS Extra Time show from Monday to Friday from 1 a.m. to 6 a.m. with co-presenter Josh Munday, and is an occasional guest on the Guardian Football Weekly podcast.

In the 2012 Summer Paralympics, he was one of the sports commentators for the games on Channel 4.

Jarrett-Bryan is a below-the-knee amputee who has worn a prosthesis since he was 18 months old. He played wheelchair basketball at club and national level for 15 years, including becoming a two-time European champion with the GB Junior wheelchair basketball team which he captained in 2004.
