= Matt Scott (sports journalist) =

- Occupation: Journalism
- Known for: Investigative journalism

Matt Scott is a British sports journalist.

He is best known for his work in The Guardian newspaper in the 'Digger' column which was printed between 2007 and 2011. He was also an occasional contributor to the Guardian's Football Weekly podcast. He vacated his position at The Guardian in January 2012, having been employed there since 2003. Since then he has written for the Daily Telegraph and was a columnist for the website Inside World Football (IWF).

He had previously worked for Sportsbeat, Worldsport.com and the Daily Star.

In 2025 he appeared in and was credited as an associate producer for the Sky Documentaries film King of Lies: Football's Trillion Dollar Con.

A known Arsenal F.C. fan, he is the great grandson of William Scott; a former player of Arsenal and Forfar Athletic.
