= Troy Townsend =

British activist (born 1965)

Troy Donoghue Townsend MBE (born 1 August 1965) is a British anti-racism worker, broadcaster and former footballer. He is head of development at the anti-racism organisation Kick It Out, where he has worked since 2001. He was previously a youth footballer with Millwall and Crystal Palace, and later manager at Leyton, Cheshunt, and coach at Slough Town and Boreham Wood. He is a regular pundit on The Guardian's Football Weekly podcast.

Townsend has been involved with Kick It Out since 2001. In 2013, the Football Association presented him with a Grassroot Hero Award for his anti-racism work. He has been a regular pundit with The Guardian since 2021.

Townsend is the father of professional footballer Andros Townsend. His son Kurtis Townsend was in the youth team at AFC Wimbledon, but died in 2001 following a car accident while travelling to a game for Cheshunt. His nephew is footballer Colin Kazim-Richards.

Townsend was appointed Member of the Order of the British Empire (MBE) in the 2024 New Year Honours for services to diversity and inclusion in association football.
