= Hubert Dalwood =

British sculptor

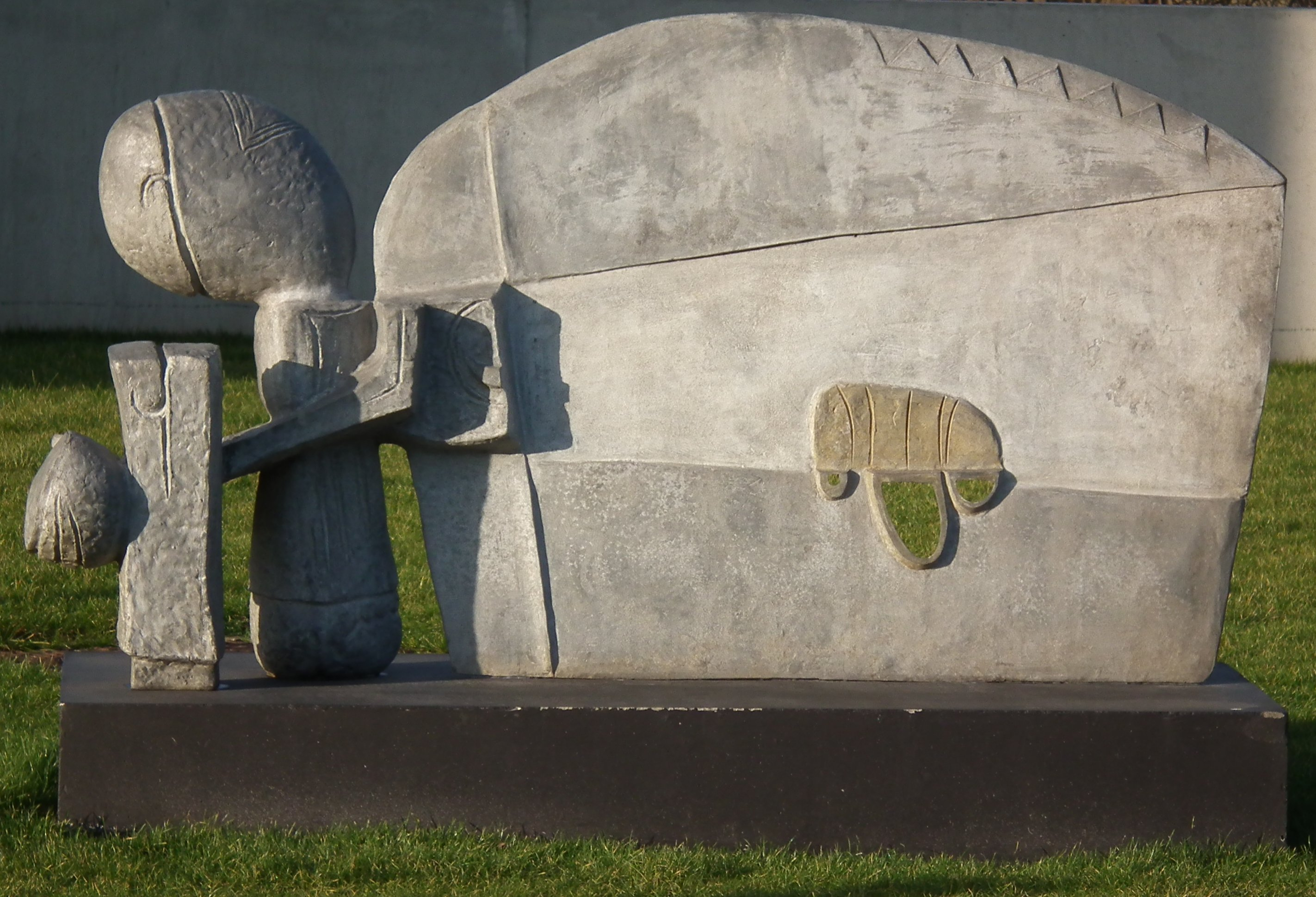
Damos by Hubert Dalwood, The Hepworth Gallery, Wakefield

Hubert Cyril Dalwood ARA (2 June 1924 – 2 November 1976) was a British sculptor. He was widely known as 'Nibs'.

== Life ==
Dalwood was born on 2 June 1924 at 78 Whiteladies Road, Clifton, Bristol. He was apprenticed to the Bristol Aeroplane Company (1940–44), and attended the Bristol School of Art part-time. After national service in the Royal Navy, he studied at Bath Academy of Art. He was a teacher of sculpture at several institutions over the years. In 1956 he was one of the first members of the 56 Group Wales.

He married Mary Nicolson and they had two daughters. They divorced in 1963 and he married Caroline Gaunt with whom he had two sons. They divorced in 1974. He died 2 November 1976 in St Bartholomew's Hospital, London.

== Artwork ==
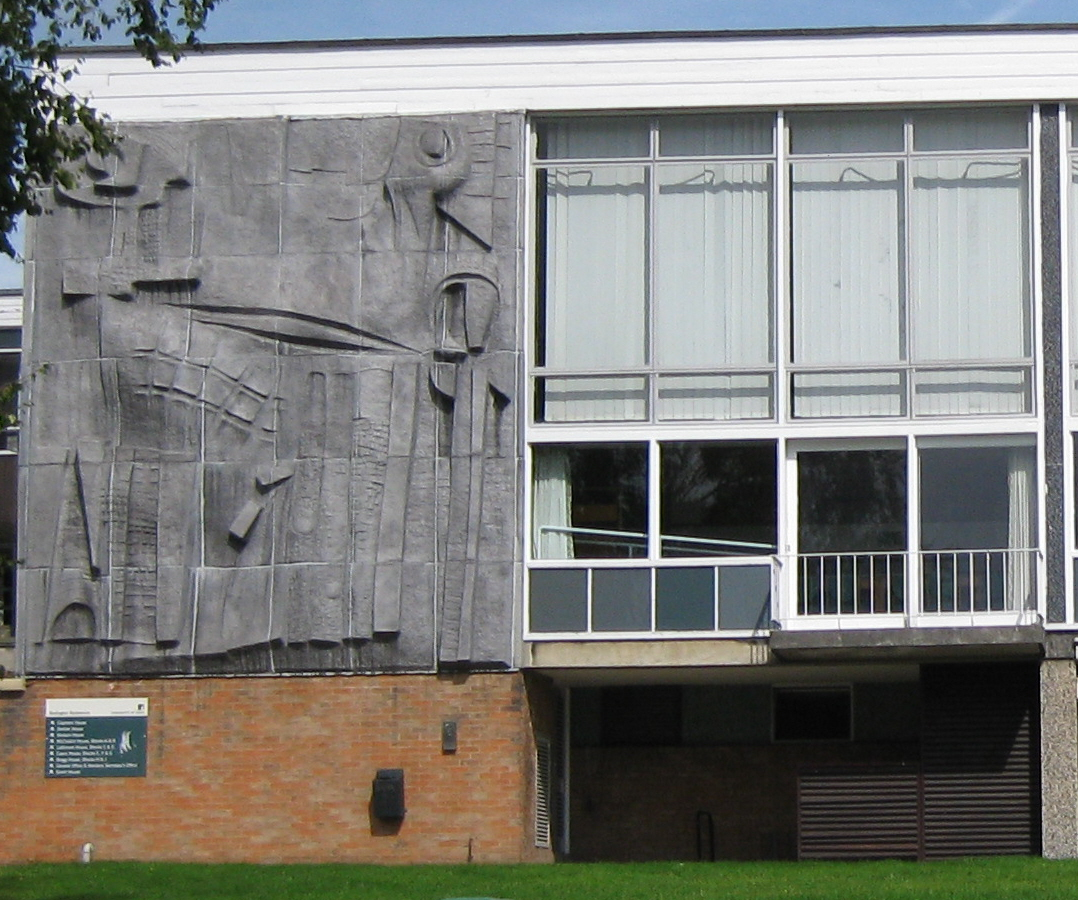
Relief mural on Bodington Hall

In 1959 he won first prize at the John Moores exhibition in Liverpool for his ovoid Large Object and won the David Bright prize at the 1962 Venice Biennale. From 1959 to 1962 he was engaged on a commission to construct a large cast aluminium relief mural (6.4 x 6.1 m) for the new Bodington Hall student accommodation complex at the University of Leeds. The significance of this work was considered such that the building was scheduled Grade II listed on grounds that he was a leading sculptor; it represented his first large scale output in his great period, and its high aesthetic quality. When the Hall was demolished, the mural was transferred to another University of Leeds building.

== Selected works ==
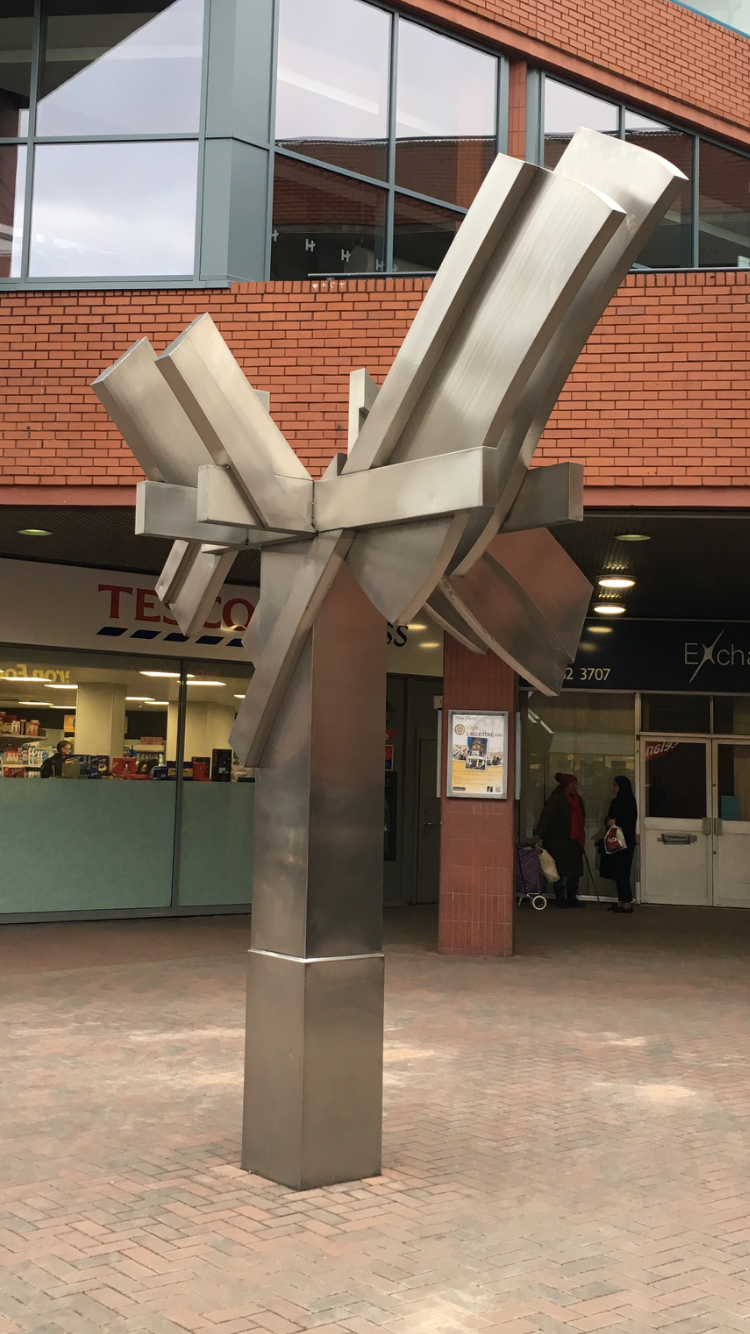
Metal Tree outside Leicester Haymarket Theatre

- Standing Draped Figure 1954
- Lucca 1958
- Large Object 1959
- O.A.S. Assassins 1962
- Maquette for 'Arbor' 1971
- The Metal Tree, Haymarket Centre and Leicester Haymarket Theatre, Belgrave Gate, Leicester, Leicestershire. 1974.

== Bibliography ==
- The Sculpture of Hubert Dalwood by Chris Stephens (1999) published: The Henry Moore Foundation in association with Lund Humphries ISBN 0-85331-786-0.
