= Rory Smith (journalist) =

English journalist

Rory Smith is an English journalist, broadcaster and author. Since April 2025 he has served as Football Correspondent for The Observer, alongside its acquisition by Tortoise Media. Before that, he was a Senior Writer, Global Sports at The Athletic, which he joined in 2024 having previously been the chief soccer correspondent of The New York Times from 2016. Smith is a former journalist of The Times, The Independent, and The Daily Telegraph.

== Career ==
Smith was ghostwriter on the book Champions League Dreams with Rafa Benitez published in 2012. Smith’s 2016 book Mister: The Men Who Gave The World The Game was short listed for the William Hill Sports Book of the Year. Mister was included in the best 50 football books ever written in a list compiled by FourFourTwo magazine.

In 2022 Smith published the book Expected Goals: The Story of How Data Conquered Football and Changed the Game Forever.

A frequent guest on BBC Radio 5 Live, Smith has also written for ESPN, The Blizzard and FourFourTwo. He has appeared on the Second Captains podcast, often on The Anfield Wrap, and The Totally Football Show as well as recording his own weekly Set Piece Menu podcast with Hugh Ferris, football commentator Steven Wyeth and former England international Andy Hinchcliffe. Television appearances include Sky Sports Sunday Supplement and TNT Sports' coverage of UEFA club competitions.

== Awards ==
In 2015 he was highly commended by the Sports Journalists' Association He was nominated for writer of the year at the 2013, 2015, 2017 and 2019 Football Supporters Federation Awards, winning in 2015 and 2019. Set Piece Menu Podcast was nominated in the ‘Podcast of the Year’ category at the 2018 Football Supporters Federation Awards, as well as shortlisted for the Podcast of the Year at the Football Supporters' Association awards in 2020 and 2021.

== Personal life ==
Smith is from Leeds. He grew up as a Liverpool F.C. fan, though considers himself "lapsed" due to his work as a journalist.
