= Internet Football Association =

The IFA Logo

The Internet Football Association (also known as the IFA) is an organisation which runs football competitions for supporters' teams across the United Kingdom. Its flagship competition is the IFA League, and the highlight of the IFA calendar is WorldNET. The motto of the IFA is "Internet football is not about winning, it's about building bridges between rival groups of football supporters."

== Origins of the IFA ==
In the early nineties many supporters, particularly ex-pats, kept in touch with other fans via email. Those people tended to mainly be in technical or academic professions where email was widely available. The first ever internet organised football match was held in Nottingham on 30 July 1995 between Leeds Lards and Internet Hotspurs. Leeds won the match 6-3.

== WorldNET ==
=== History ===
The IFA's annual tournament, WorldNET, traces its roots back to 1996. In the build up to UEFA Euro 96, there had been concerns over whether English football fans would be able to behave themselves. Dave "Voice of Football" Walmsley wanted to show that football fans could come together in the spirit of the game, play football and build bridges between their respective teams. Through the use of email discussion groups, Dave organised a sixteen-team tournament to be held on 9 June 1996 in Nottingham, and EuroNET 96 was born. From that point it grew to represent the teams of message boards and email discussion groups across the UK. Dave Walmsley stood down after EuroNET 96 and the organisation was taken on by John Boocock and Roger Goodair. In 1999 it was renamed WorldNET to better represent the world-wide interest the tournament now had.

=== WorldNET Today ===
In the time since then, WorldNET has become even bigger. 2008 saw the introduction of a Veterans' tournament. With 64 teams in the main tournament and 16 in the veterans, there were a record 80 teams competing at WorldNET 2009.

WorldNET was held at Bodington Hall, University of Leeds between 2000 and 2012. In 2013, the Veterans' tournament remained in Leeds whilst the main tournament was held at the University of Central Lancashire, Preston. WorldNET attracts teams from all over Europe and some from even further afield, with previous entrants including supporters of Inter Milan, RC Lens, St. Pauli and even an Arsenal supporters' team from Nigeria.

The WorldNET tournament is played over a summer weekend. The tournament is preceded on the Friday by the IFA Challenge Cup Final and an England vs Scotland friendly. The tournament begins with the group stages on the Saturday. There are 4 teams in each group who play each other once. Games are 30 minutes long (15 minutes each half). All teams return on the Sunday for the knock-out stages, with the top two teams from each group competing in the main tournament (called the WorldNET Cup) to determine the overall winner. The bottom two teams from each group compete for the WorldNET Plate.

WorldNET has been supported by The Football Supporters' Federation since 2009, and they provided a free programme for all participants and spectators.

=== Past winners ===
Year	WorldNET Winners	WorldNET Runners-up	Plate Winners	Plate Runners-up	Veterans Winners	Veterans Runners-up
1996	Middlesbrough	QPR				
1997	Bradford City	Birmingham				
1998	QPR					
1999	Arsenal					
2000	Middlesbrough		Arsenal			
2001	Middlesbrough	Dumbarton	Arsenal			
2002	Charlton Athletic	Bradford City	Aberdeen	Motherwell		
2003	Celtic	Inter Milan	Portsmouth	Brentford		
2004	Dumbarton	Stockport	Stockport	Inter Milan		
2005	Rotherham United	QPR	Scunthorpe	Inter Milan		
2006	Celtic	Dumbarton	QPR	Doncaster		
2007	RC Lens		Leicester	Darlington		
2008	Preston North End	Watford A	QPR	Arsenal Nigeria	Arsenal Nigeria	Birmingham
2009	West Bromwich Albion	Bradford City	Welling United	York City	Bury	Leicester City
2010	Bradford City	RC Lens	QPR	Leicester City	AFC Halifax	Arsenal Nigeria
2011	RC Lens	Bradford City	Portsmouth	Darlington	Bury	AFC Halifax
2012	Crystal Palace	RC Lens	Darlington	Bradford City	AFC Halifax	Everton
2013	AFC Halifax	Crystal Palace	Manchester United	Darlington	Bradford City	AFC Halifax
2014	AFC Halifax	Preston North End	Runcorn Linnets	Port Vale		

== The IFA League ==
The IFA league has an unusual structure, where instead of a set fixture list with teams playing each other a set number of times, it is up to the teams themselves to organise fixtures. This means that some teams play more games than others, but each team is limited to playing a maximum of twenty games. Even when they lose, teams are rewarded for making the effort to turn up and play fixtures, with one league point being awarded for a defeat, two points for a draw and three for a win.

The ideal of the IFA is that two supporters teams will get together and play each other on a Saturday morning, before attending the match between the two teams they support in the afternoon. IFA fixtures are often arranged so as to coincide with meetings of the teams they support, however it does not always work out this way.

The main IFA league consists of around eighty teams, and is not split into separate divisions. However, there is a Scottish league. Scottish teams tend to compete in both leagues, with their fixtures counting towards both competitions. Scottish teams regularly do well in matches against their English counterparts, with Celtic having won WorldNET twice, and Hibs having won the IFA Cup three times, and in 2011 Motherwell became the first Scottish team ever to win the IFA league.

Every year, each team is invited to vote for the Team of the Year award, granted to the team that has played the game in the best spirit, closest to the ethos of the IFA.

Below is a table of past winners of the IFA league, along with the Scottish League Champions and the Team of the Year.

Year	IFA League Champions	Scottish League Champions	Team of the Year
1998	QPR		Watford
1999	QPR		Not awarded
2000	Arsenal		Huddersfield Town
2001	QPR		Brentford
2002	QPR	Hibs	Hull City
2003	Millwall	Hearts	Grimsby Town
2004	Fulham	Ayr United	Tranmere Rovers
2005	Millwall	Aberdeen	Watford
2006	Rotherham United	Hearts	Preston North End
2007	Preston North End	Falkirk	Preston North End
2008	Rochdale	Stirling Albion	Watford
2009	Preston North End	Ayr United	West Ham United
2010	Preston North End	Ayr United	Kidderminster Harriers
2011	Motherwell	Motherwell	Ipswich Town
2012	Preston North End	Ayr United	Watford
2013	Livingston GS	Livingston GS	AFC Chorley
2014	Preston North End	Livingston GS	West Ham United

== The IFA Challenge Cup ==
Every year, the IFA Challenge Cup is contested by IFA member teams from across the UK alongside regular IFA League games. The final of this competition is played on the Friday evening of WorldNET. Below is a list of past winners of this competition.

Year	Winners	Runners-up
2000	Celtic	
2001	Hibs	
2002	QPR	Watford
2003	Hibs	Charlton Athletic
2004	Ayr United	Millwall
2005	Fulham	Ayr United
2006	Preston North End	Nottingham Forest
2007	Hibs	Bury
2008	Bury A	Rochdale
2009	Preston North End	West Bromwich Albion
2010	Preston North End	West Bromwich Albion
2011	Preston North End	Kidderminster
2012	Kidderminster	Ayr United
2013	Preston North End	Hearts
2014	Livingston GS	Preston North End
