= Steven Wyeth =

British football commentator

Steven Wyeth is a British football commentator for the BBC and TNT Sports amongst others.

== Early life ==
Wyeth attended the University of Manchester and commented on Manchester United for Manchester Sports and for BBC Radio Manchester.

== Career ==
=== Commentary ===
Wyeth commentates on the BBC’s flagship football highlights show Match of the Day. For TNT Sports Wyeth covers commentary on Champions League, Europa League, Bundesliga, Ligue 1 and Serie A

In July 2023, he was announced to be commentating for the BBC at the 2023 FIFA Women's World Cup.

=== Podcasts ===
Wyeth has a football podcast with Hugh Ferris, Rory Smith, and Andy Hinchcliffe called Set Piece Menu in which the four (a journalist, a commentator, a presenter and an ex-footballer) "discuss football over food". It has been described as ‘intelligent, well-informed and delightfully warm discourse’ by The Football Faithful. Wyeth has also guested on the official UEFA Champions League podcast.

== Personal life ==
Wyeth’s brother David made national headlines at the 2017 London Marathon when he completed in under three hours but had to be helped across the line by a fellow competitor after his legs gave way 200m from the finish line.
