= Kevin McCarra =

Scottish sports journalist (1958–2020)

- Born: Kevin J. McCarra; February 1, 1958
- Died: October 24, 2020 (aged 62)
- Education: University of Glasgow
- Occupation: Sportswriter

Kevin J. McCarra (1 February 1958 – 24 October 2020) was a Scottish sportswriter.

== Biography ==
McCarra was educated at Glasgow University, receiving a MA (Hons) degree. McCarra was married to Susan Stewart.

He was chief football correspondent for The Guardian newspaper. He often appeared on the Guardian Podcast Football Weekly hosted by James Richardson. He also worked for Scotland on Sunday, The Sunday Times and The Times, and appeared on BBC Radio Scotland's "Good Morning Scotland" as a newspaper reviewer.

He died from Alzheimer's disease on 24 October 2020, aged 62.

== Works ==
- Official Scotland World Cup Supporters' Book (1998)
- One Afternoon in Lisbon (1988)
- One Hundred Cups: Story of the Scottish Cup (1985)
- Scottish Football: Pictorial History from 1867 to the Present Day (1984)
