= YB SK Beveren =

Belgian football club

Beveren
- Full name: Yellow Blue SupportersKring Beveren
- Founded: 20 January 2011; 15 years ago
- Ground: Freethiel Stadion, Beveren
- Capacity: 600
- Owner: VZW Eskabee 1935
- Chairman: Andre Bolsens
- Manager: Patrick Geertsen
- League: Belgian 2nd Provincial League
- Website: http://www.eskabee.be/

YB SK Beveren is a Belgian association football team that plays in the Belgian Provincial Leagues. The club was established by supporters of former Belgian champion K.S.K. Beveren, after the unofficial merger of their team with Red Star Waasland in May 2010. It is the first and currently the only Belgian team that is completely fan-owned and applies the principles of Supporters Direct.

== History ==
After a long period of financial struggle and a very likely relegation from the Belgian Second Division, the board members of K.S.K. Beveren decided in May 2010 to terminate all male senior footballing activities for the next season. This decision came after political pressure at community level and was the result of expensive investments in the club's Freethiel Stadion. It then was decided that instead of K.S.K. Beveren, the local neighbours of K.F.C. Red Star Waasland (a small but financially healthy club) would start the 2010–2011 season at the Freethiel Stadion. As a concession to the Beveren supporters, the club changed its name to Waasland-Beveren, its colours to yellow-blue-red and its badge into a newly created one. However, the majority of the board members, the manager and the players of Red Star Waasland moved to Beveren and the club took on the football association's number of Waasland (4068).

For many supporters this concession wasn't enough. While hundreds of fans simply stayed away from the new club Waasland-Beveren, a fraction of them started a new project. On August 4, 2010, a new website was launched, www.eskabee.be, in order to commemorate the rich past of K.S.K. Beveren and to restart a new team in the lower Belgian divisions. In a couple of weeks the new site received over 500 registrees and drew attention from several national newspapers, who reported the "Resurrection of KSK Beveren from its ashes". One of the figureheads of the new project was former Dutch international Wim Hofkens, who played for K.S.K. Beveren between 1976 and 1980. On January 12, 2011, the official website reported that the VZW Eskabee 1935 was formed and that the statutes were written. On January 21, 2011, these statutes were signed by the ten founding members of the VZW, including chairman Andre Bolsens, a local doctor who was the only board member of K.S.K. Beveren that voted against the merger of May 2010. The new club also announced their cooperation with Supporters Direct and their clear ambition to restart footballing activities in the lowest Belgian division.

On March 23, 2011, the club played its first unofficial friendly game against the Under 19s team of local club HRS Haasdonk. The match served as a testing training in order to form a team for the 2011–2012 season under the management of Wim Hofkens. Beveren won the game by 2–0 in front of a crowd of nearly 350 spectators. Shortly after the match, the club officially sent a request to the Royal Belgian Football Association to register their team for the upcoming season under the name 'Supporterskring Beveren'. On April 5, 2011, the Municipality of Beveren announced that there was no place for the new club in their town, despite earlier agreements with the Schepen of Sports and several talks with Waasland-Beveren about the use of the training fields surrounding Freethiel Stadion. Despite this major setback, the club played a second testing match against the KSK Kallo reserve team the following evening and won again, this time with 2–5 in front of 300 spectators.

During the first General Assembly of the VZW on April 25, 2011, it was decided that the club would start playing its first season in the neighboring city of Sint-Niklaas, specifically at a training field of former 2nd Division club Sportkring Sint-Niklaas. Instead of 'Supporterskring Beveren', which was denied by the Royal Belgian Football Association, the name 'Yellow Blue Beveren' was chosen, referring to the club colours and taking Yellow Red K.V. Mechelen as an example in that regard. The club received registration number 9577 from the Royal Belgian Football Association, but has always maintained the ambition of recovering the number 2300 from K.S.K. Beveren in the future as a rightful heir of its legacy. On May 30, 2011, both the agreement with Sportkring Sint-Niklaas and the registration with the Royal Belgian Football Association were settled, so YB SK Beveren was finally able to start playing football in the 2011–2012 season.

On July 24, 2011, YB SK Beveren played its first official pre-season friendly and lost against Belgica Edegem. On September 4, 2011, started the competition with a 2–2 draw in an away game against Hardy Waasmunster, with striker Bjorn Van Der Stighelen scoring the first official goal for the club in front of over 300 fans. The following week YB SK Beveren won its first home game against VK Tielrode with 1–0 in front of 450 fans, again causing significant media attention from several national football websites. After a promising start the club failed to confirm, resulting in a bad streak and the resignation of Wim Hofkens as a manager. His successor Luc Piessens debuted in the worst imaginable way losing 9–1 away to Haasdonk B, which is to date the worst defeat ever of YB SK Beveren. On January 5, 2012, founding board member Wim Hofkens left the club definitively after his earlier resignation as a manager. Despite the relatively poor results 270 fans visited the away game against SK Belsele. In an atmospheric game played in Red Star Waasland's former home, the Puyenbekestadion, Beveren won with 0–2. Early March, active player Margino De Kerf took over as manager for the remainder of the season. Beveren ended the 2011–2012 season in a disappointing 11th position.

Since the beginning of the year 2012 several meetings between the club and the Municipality of Beveren took place, in which the possibility of returning to home town Beveren was discussed. Early March, Major Marc Van De Vijver declared in local media that there was a very big chance that the club was yet again welcome in his village, since the fans of the club had proved during the first season that there were no significant security risks during their matches. Early April, the General Assembly of the club voted in favour of a return to Beveren, despite the good relationship with Sportkring Sint-Niklaas. On August 5, 2012, YB SK Beveren played its first official game in its hometown Beveren in an East Flanders Cup (a qualification tournament of the Beker van België) game against Hardy Waasmunster. The club was granted permission to play its home games on a former training field of KSK Beveren near the Freethiel, sharing its usage with Waasland-Beveren. While the supporters could celebrate the return to their home soil, on the field affairs kept on lacking stability as proven by the resignation of the sporting director before competition even started. After a string of disappointing results, head coach Margino De Kerf was dismissed and replaced by assistant coach Kurt Dierick. Under the new head coach, Beveren won a series of matches to eventually obtain a place in the promotion playoffs. The decisive match against Overmere was played in Freethiel Stadium, which meant the return of the club to their spiritual home almost three years after the dissolving of KSK Beveren. In the playoffs Beveren drew a bye for the first round, which meant that they only had to win one away game against Wippelgem in order to achieve promotion. In a tight game, Beveren won 1–2 with Alexander Vereecken and Koen Strybos scoring before a crowd of nearly 500 travelling fans.

After a promising start of the season, newly promoted Beveren started to struggle in the higher division with inter alia a devastating 8–0 loss at Sinaai who would eventually become the new champion. At the end of October, the sporting director as well as several new signings left the club due to the bad results and disagreements with the board. A few weeks later, head coach Kurt Dierick became the new sporting director with his first assignment being the search for a replacement for himself as head coach. On November 6, 2013, Benny Van Polfliet was appointed as new head coach. During the winter break, three new players were added to the team. Amongst them were two Dutchmen who came through the youth system of PSV Eindhoven and one of them, Rachid Chelah, even had a past as a professional a few years earlier. After an away defeat against relegation rivals White Boys Sint-Niklaas, Benny Van Polfliet was dismissed after being in charge for not even two months. A few weeks later, former KSK Beveren professional player Stefan Van Rumst was appointed as new head coach. A few days later, the whole technical staff except the head coach and the sporting director left the club, being disappointed in the board's decision of choosing Van Rumst. Eventually YB SK Beveren ended in last place with only 17 points and relegated back to the 4th Provincial League.

YB SK Beveren started the 2014–2015 with new hopes and a lot of new players. Pre-season friendlies and tournaments promised the best, as Beveren won its first trophy with the Beker van Beveren. A late winner from Lenny Laureys proved enough to beat KFC Vrasene in the final. The club also reached the final of the Waasland Cup, but lost to White Boys Sint-Niklaas with 4–2. Competition started well with inter alia an 8–0 home win against Baasrode at KSK Beveren's 79th birthday, but a black November month in which the club lost to local neighbours Bosdam and suffered its worst defeat of the season in a 5-0 battering at Belsele promised another difficult year in Belgium's bottom league. After the return of several injured players, Beveren won eight matches in a row from late December until early March (the longest winning streak in their history until that point), bringing them back to second place in the league. On April 18, 2015, Beveren secured a place in the play-offs for promotion with a 3–1 home win against SK Belsele. On May 5, 2015, Beveren won the play-offs and secured promotion to the 3rd Provincial League with a convincing 0–5 away win at Rupelmonde. Player of the Season Dominique Lefevre, Kristof Van Rumst, Jimmy Potithai and Lenny Laureys scored before half-time, while Potithai added its second of the afternoon after the break. More than 500 fans made the trip to Rupelmonde, providing a big atmosphere.

Newly promoted Beveren started the 2015–2016 season with a deserved draw at White Boys Sint-Niklaas, obtained by a last gasp goal by captain Tom Van Den Eede, who would become a few weeks later the first player of YB SK Beveren to perform in 100 league games. A week later the club celebrated the 80th birthday of KSK Beveren with a party, a firework spectacle and a close win against Hamme-Zogge. Furthermore, the day after the club released the first part of its book that commemorates the rich past of KSK Beveren. Several of the most notable players were presented at the official release event, including Jean-Marie Pfaff, Wilfried Van Moer and Jean Janssens (the three Beveren players who won the Belgian Golden Shoe). The club also appeared in Belgium's most important football magazine which discussed the story of the authors of the book. The festivities however were halted a few weeks later, when an incident took place between some fans during the home game against SK Wachtebeke (see section Rivalries) which would eventually lead to a 0–5 loss and a 1500 euro fine from the Royal Belgian Football Association. Despite having the chance to obtain a ticket for the play-offs in February, YB SK Beveren ended the season in mid-table, hereby meeting the goal of staying in the division.

== Supporters and friendships across Europe ==
From the early beginnings, YB SK Beveren took AFC Wimbledon as an excellent example of a successful club based on fan participation. In December 2010 a delegation of fans, board members and a local television (TV Oost) crew took a bus trip to London for the Wimbledon home game against Wrexham F.C., but were forced to return because of the postponement of the match due to heavy snowfall. The trip was rescheduled to March 12, 2011, for the home game of the Dons against the Kidderminster Harriers F.C. AFC Wimbledon announced the visit on their official website and wrote an article about their Belgian followers in the official match day program. A couple of weeks later the famous English football magazine FourFourTwo also reported about the influence of AFC Wimbledon on YB SK Beveren.

Another English club who has received frequent visits of YB SK Beveren is F.C. United of Manchester, who themselves are a fan-owned club since 2005. In April 2011 several board members of Beveren travelled to Manchester to meet the club's president Andy Walsh and Supporters Direct representative Kevin Rye. The club's board members were invited to the playing field before kick-off and were introduced to the fans. On March 10, 2012, several board members and supporters of Beveren visited the club for their home game against Stocksbridge Park Steels.

On July 27, 2013, YB SK Beveren and its fans made a trip to London to play for the Supporters Direct Cup against local opponents Enfield Town FC. In front of 330 spectators (of which 70 came from Beveren) Enfield Town FC convincingly beat Beveren with 8–2, making the final the one with the biggest goal difference in the history of the Supporters Direct Cup. On July 26, 2014, Enfield Town visited Beveren for a friendly match against Eskabee. The match ended in a 0–4 win for the Londoners, who made the trip along with 100 fans and also made a stop in Ypres to pay respect for the fallen heroes of World War I. On March 14, 2015, a bus coach with fans from YB SK Beveren made a five-hour trip to London to watch Enfield Town FC take on Leatherhead FC in the Isthmian League.

Although fan participation is a relatively unknown subject in Belgian football, YB SK Beveren received praise from several other clubs and fangroups in Belgium. In September 2011 the club received a financial gift from FAS(C), the supporters union of R Antwerp FC and in the following years kept on supporting each other.

The club was invited in June 2012 to celebrate the 75th birthday of local club Stekene Sportief with a friendly match. It proved to be the last birthday of the club, as they merged with local neighbours Straatje the next season. In early January 2013, a group of frustrated fans of Sint-Truidense V.V. declared the start of a new club, taking YB SK Beveren as an example (however the attempt to do this led to nothing).

YB SK Beveren is a fan-owned club member of Supporters Direct and applies the principles of the organisation. Beveren's board member Jim Van De Vyver made some important contributions to the 'Improving Football Governance through Supporter Involvement and Community Ownership' Project, which was financed by the European Commission. In early March 2014, Van De Vyver and the VZW Eskabee 1935 in cooperation with Supporters Direct presented a toolkit with instructions for Belgian teams to introduce fan participation.

On February 4, 2015, the club was invited to the opening session of the Intergroup Sport, a project of the European Commission with co-presidents Santiago Fisas and Marc Tarabella, to discuss the importance of sport in Europe and to improve the future of football.

== Rivalries ==
K.S.K. Beveren has had a long-standing rivalry with fellow Waasland club Sporting Lokeren. Even in the lowest divisions this caused tension at several occasions between both sets of fans, especially in YB SK Beveren's away games against clubs from the neighbouring villages of Lokeren. This resulted in unusual safety regulations for the away game against FC Eksaarde in November 2011, a match which the club won in convincing style with 0–3 after a long period without winning.

The club's promotion in 2013 meant that Beveren would again face opposition of clubs from around the Lokeren municipality. Special safety regulations were instructed for the away game at SK Lokeren-Doorslaar. Early October 2013, major Rudy Van Cronenburg of Wachtebeke decided to postpone the match between SK Wachtebeke and YB SK Beveren due to security risks. The main reason for this risk lay in the fact that local police had intercepted plans of fans of Sporting Lokeren to reunite with their colleagues of Dutch side NAC Breda in order to interrupt the game and clash with supporters of Beveren. Eventually, the match was played at the end of December and ended in a 3–3 draw. A police force was present in large numbers, but no incidents occurred. The rivalry between Beveren and Lokeren fans was only more fueled up by the home game against Daknam. With 5 minutes on the clock and Beveren up 3–2, the referee decided to pause the game due to smoke circulation on the field caused by fireworks, but the visitors subsequently refused to finish the match because they felt threatened. Almost a month later, the provincial disciplinary committee of the Royal Belgian Football Association decided that the Daknam players had no reason for the refusal and punished Daknam with a 5–0 defeat.

Things really went bad in the 2015–2016 season, in which the club returned to the 3rd Provincial League. On October 10, 2015, during a home game against Wachtebeke, some fans had an argument which resulted in a brawl on the sidelines. While the situation was quickly under control, the referee decided to end the game with a couple of minutes remaining. Monday's newspapers reported a massive fight of hooligans against the opposition side. On October 13, 2015, the club placed an official statement on its website in which it acknowledged the brawl, but severely criticised the local media for its reporting. A day later, the mayors of Lokeren, Wachtebeke and Lochristi asked the Royal Belgian Football Association to postpone upcoming fixtures against Zaffelare, Beervelde, Eksaarde and Wachtebeke (return fixtures). The incident would eventually lead to a 0–5 loss and a 1500 euro fine from the Royal Belgian Football Association. On November 2, 2015, the club appealed the decision, but the Royal Belgian Football Association rejected the appeal. Eventually, the majors decided to forbid fans to watch the games against Eksaarde, Zaffelare and Wachtebeke, an unprecedented measure in Belgian provincial football. The club reacted by offering their fans the chance to watch the game via a livestream.

YB SK Beveren's closest neighbours are FC Bosdam, whose playing field is just a few hundred metres away. This derby match takes place in a friendly but atmospheric fashion. After a 0–2 loss before the winter break, YBSKB won its first 'Beveren Derby' with 1–2 in March 2012. The derby became a bit more intense during the 2012–2013 season, mainly because of an ongoing dispute between Bosdam's players and Beveren's head coach during a scintillating home game early 2013 which ended in a 3–3 draw. The last season in which both teams played each other was the 2014–2015 season: Bosdam won 2–0 in November, while Beveren demolished the neighbours in the return match with a 5–1 win.
