= Nathan Bodington =

Sir Nathan Bodington (29 May 1848 – 12 May 1911) was the first Vice Chancellor of the University of Leeds having been Principal and Professor of Greek at the Yorkshire College since 1883. From 1897 to 1901 he was also Vice-Chancellor of the Victoria University.

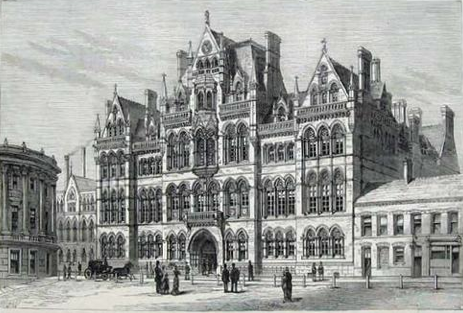
Mason College, now the University of Birmingham

Bodington was born in Aston, Birmingham, and educated at King Edward's School, Birmingham, and Wadham College, Oxford, where he studied classics. He was a teacher at Manchester Grammar School and Westminster School, Professor of classics at Mason College, (which later became Birmingham University), and Fellow of Lincoln College, Oxford.

Bodington was responsible for consolidating the Yorkshire College's position within the Victoria University and later, when the fragmentation of members occurred, for obtaining the charter for the separate university in Leeds. His demeanour around the 1890s was described by a colleague thus:

though transplanted from an Oxford which was then almost exclusively devoted to classical studies, he adapted himself wonderfully to the direction of an institution which, always short of money, appealed for funds almost entirely on the ground of its utility to local industry. In public he has a formal, somewhat academic, manner, which was against him in his dealings with City Councillors and businessmen and suchlike: but in private he unbent and was excellent company, with a keen sense of humour. His greying beard made him look ten years older than he really was [...] Bodington was at his best in the chair at meetings of the Senate and other academic bodies, patient, courteous and impartial.

He was knighted in 1908.

He married Eliza, the daughter of Sir John Barran, on 8 August 1907, but they had no children. As remembered by C. M. Gillespire, 'in his own house he was a charming host, but not until his happy marriage late in life was he able fully to indulge his gifts of hospitality'.

Bodington died in Headingley, Leeds, on 12 May 1911.

In 1961, the university opened Bodington Hall its largest hall of residence, named after him. A housing estate on this site is now called Bodington Manor. From 1995 to 2012, Leeds University's virtual learning environment, a Leeds-built open-source system, was known as the Nathan Bodington Building.

Academic offices
Preceded by Adolphus William Ward	Vice-Chancellor, Victoria University (UK); 1897–1901	Succeeded by Alfred Hopkinson
Preceded by New position	Vice-Chancellor, University of Leeds; 1904–1911	Succeeded by Michael Ernest Sadler
