= Max Rushden =

British sports broadcaster (born 1979)

- Born: 18 April 1979 (age 47); Cambridge, England
- Occupations: TV and radio presenter football journalist podcaster
- Employer(s): BBC London 94.9 (December 2006 – March 2008); Soccer AM (August 2008 – 2015); Talksport; BBC Radio 5 Live; The Guardian; Stan Sport
- Writing career
- Years active: 2006–current
- Genre: Sports
- Subject: Association football
- Notable work: Football Weekly
- Website: maxrushden.com

Max Paul Rushden (born 18 April 1979) is an English radio and television presenter and the current host of The Guardian's Football Weekly podcast.

== Career ==
Rushden's first presenting role was BBC London 94.9's breakfast show from December 2006 to March 2008. He turned down an offer to become a Blue Peter presenter to instead present the Saturday morning Sky Sports show Soccer AM alongside Helen Chamberlain from August 2008 until 2015. After leaving Soccer AM, he hosted a weekly Sunday show with Barry Glendenning on Talksport, before adding a Saturday morning show alongside comedian Charlie Baker. He has also occasionally worked for BBC Radio 5 Live. He was a regular substitute presenter for James Richardson on Football Weekly, before becoming its main host in 2017 after Richardson quit to launch rival The Totally Football Show.

Rushden explains that the show "ranges from proper analysis of what has happened on the pitch in the UK and around Europe, to commentary about serious issues off it, balanced with some complete nonsense."

In 2010, Rushden appeared in the music video for Love Love by Scottish singer Amy Macdonald. He also played the clarinet on stage during her show at Hammersmith Apollo in October.

In 2021, Rushden signed with Australian UEFA competitions broadcaster Stan Sport to host their football coverage. In October 2024, Rushden began hosting a new weekly show covering the A-League Men called The A-Leagues Download. He was also a regular panellist on Network 10's The Project from 2024.

In August 2024, Rushden launched the podcast 'What Did You Do Yesterday?' with Irish comedian and broadcaster David O'Doherty.

== Personal life ==
Rushden and the rest of his family changed their surname from Rubenstein when Rushden was six years old, due to antisemitic threats. Rushden is a lifelong fan of Cambridge United.

Rushden is currently based in Melbourne, Australia with his wife, author Jaime Bruce, and their two children. He plays for the Melbourne University "Bohemians" (over-35s) team, in Football Victoria's Metropolitan League.

In January 2023, Rushden's home was broken into. His Subaru car was stolen, and his company credit card was used to spend $84 at a South Melbourne McDonald's. His car was located by the police and returned to him in March 2023.
