= Football Supporters Europe =

Football fan network

- Founded: 2008
- Location: Hamburg, Germany
- Region served: UEFA member countries
- Website: fanseurope.org

Football Supporters Europe (FSE) is a football fan network formally established as a non-profit member association and claiming to have members from more than 48 UEFA member countries. Founded in July 2008 at the first European Football Fans Congress, it is considered as a legitimate partner for fan issues by institutions like the UEFA, the Council of Europe or European Professional Football Leagues.

== History ==
FSE can trace its history back to the international collaboration by fans' organisations under the former name of Football Supporters International to provide "Fans' Embassy" advice, information and support services to fans of national teams at international tournaments.

But the real story of FSE as it now exists began in July 2008, when the UK's Football Supporters' Federation (FSF) hosted in London the first European Football Fans' Congress.

The London meeting, held at Arsenal's Emirates Stadium, discussed the issues which concerned fans across Europe, and gave a great impetus to the development of the network. The following year, in Hamburg, the second European Football Fans' Congress (EFFC) was held, and alongside the workshops on issues such as discrimination, policing, ticket pricing and commercialisation, the decision was taken to adopt statutes and formally establish the network.

== Structure ==
The FSE member basis consists of individual football supporters as well as locally, nationally and transnationally active fan groups and initiatives members (allegedly from more than 48 UEFA member countries). FSE claims to represent around 3 million football fans overall and therefore to be the world's biggest fan organisation.

The highest body of the organisation is the "Bi-Annual General Meeting" (BGM) of Football Supporters Europe (FSE). The BGM is held every two years during the EFFC and it is here that the members decide with their vote about the aims, objectives and future actions of the network, approve changes to its statutes and elect the members of the FSE Committee from within the FSE membership for the following two years.

The FSE Committee is the main management board of the network, consisting of the FSE Coordination, the directors of the on-topic divisions and the elected members. Its members are responsible for the overall running of the European football fans' network. The FSE Committee members take the most important decisions, develop activities together with the wider membership and represent FSE at various activities, events and meetings such as the Annual Meeting with the UEFA President in Nyon / Switzerland.

The elected FSE Committee members for the seasons 2017/2018 and 2018/2019 are:

- Pierre Barthélemy, Association Nationale des Supporters, France.
- Kevin Miles, Football Supporters Federation (FSF), England.
- Robert Ustian, CSKA Fans Against Racism, Russia.
- Stefanie Dilba, Bündnis Aktiver Fußballfans, Germany.
- Hüseyin Emre Ballı, 1907 ÜNIFEB, Turkey.
- Paul Corkrey, Fans Embassy Wales, Wales.
- Herjan Pullen, Supportersvereniging Ajax, The Netherlands.
- Jim Spratt, Amalgamation of Official Northern Ireland Supporter clubs, Northern Ireland.

The Committee further consists of:

- Ronan Evain, Football Supporters Europe (FSE) – Coordination
- Michael Gabriel, KOS, Germany - Director FSE Fans' Embassy Division
- Mark Doidge, England - Director Anti-Discrimination Division

The FSE coordination office is based in Hamburg (Germany). Its employees and interns coordinate the different initiatives and divisions and are responsible for the background administration and management of the organisation (i.e. accountancy, legal issues, internal and external communication etc.). The FSE Coordination is appointed by the FSE Committee.

The on-topic FSE divisions (such as fans' embassies or the anti-discrimination division) focus on particular themes. They are semi-autonomous networks or bodies providing particular services relevant for football fans and develop their work under the umbrella of the European fans´ network. Each on-topic division appoints a director who represents the on-topic division within the FSE-Committee.

== Core principles ==
All FSE members sign up to "proactively support" the four so-called core principles of the organization:

- Opposition to any form of discrimination (based on grounds such as ethnic origin, ability, religion and belief, gender, sexual orientation and age).
- Rejection of violence (both physical and verbal).
- Empowerment of grassroots football supporters.
- Promotion of a positive football and supporters' culture, including values such as fair play and good governance.

== Examples of activities ==
=== EFFC Congress ===
The European Football Fan Congress is organized on a yearly basis by Football Supporters Europe in collaboration with local fan groups from the FSE membership and other fan organisations from the host city and country. It is aimed at tackling fan issues and encouraging fan dialogue, fan self-regulation and fan culture through workshops, discussion panels and other debates between football fans and representatives of European football governing bodies and political institutions. It takes place each year in a different city: 2008 in London, 2009 in Hamburg, 2010 in Barcelona, 2011 in Copenhagen, 2012 in Istanbul and 2013 in Amsterdam with the participation of Gianni Infantino, UEFA General Secretary. Further European Fan Congresses took place near Bologna (2014) and in Belfast (2015), where the FSE membership decided to switch from annual to bi-annual EFFCs. The next EFFC will take place in the Belgian cities of Ghent and Lokeren from 6 to 9 July 2017.

=== Handbook on Supporters Charters ===
Supporters Charters are defined by institutions like the European Commission and the Council of Europe as a joint agreement between clubs/FAs and their fans, where they develop each other's rights and obligations in a negotiation/mediation process, the results of which are put down in a so-called Supporters Charter which is reviewed on a regular basis after its adoption. It should therewith serve as a major tool for the establishment of a social dialogue with the overall objective of preventing tensions between clubs and fans as well as anti-social fans' behaviour.

Upon initiative of FSE, a European Supporters Charter Handbook was elaborated in consultation with European football governing bodies such as UEFA and the European Professional Football Leagues (EPFL), national associations and leagues, the world players' union FIFPro, fans' representatives from the FSE membership and representatives of institutions such as the European Commission and the Council of Europe. According to the chair of the Standing Committee on Spectator Violence of the Council of Europe, Jo Vanhecke, the "process to produce this handbook was in itself a breakthrough. All relevant stakeholders have had an input and discussed the content in an open dialogue, based on principles of mutual respect and equal status". The final document was designed as a practical tool kit to serve clubs and fans and was endorsed by the EU Commissioner for Education and Culture, Androulla Vassiliou and UEFA President Michel Platini.

The handbook was launched on 3 June 2013 in Vienna as part of the "ProSupporters Seminar and Round Table". Promoted by the European institutions, it is available in 5 languages as hard copy edition and for download via the FSE-website.

=== Fans' Action Fund ===
Launched in 2013, the "Fans' Action Fund" is meant to finance fans' initiatives and projects through the profits generated via an online-shop.

=== Fans' Embassies at international matches ===
The Fans' Embassy concept dates back to services provided for supporters of the England and Germany teams at the 1990 World Cup in Italy, and has evolved through subsequent tournaments. After EURO 2016, Fans' Embassies may be seen as an established and successful part of fan hosting at major football tournaments. According to the FSE website, "the essential features of a Fans' Embassy service are the provision of accurate, reliable, up-to-date, independent and objective information on any matters of interest to football fans, by fans for fans". The FSE Fans' Embassy Division developed a Smartphone App to provide travelling fans with such information whilst all club and city info is put together via other football fans themselves.

=== Stadium Action Days ===
FSE initiated two European stadium action days on topics that were considered relevant to football supporters across Europe – the first ones were organised under the motto "Our Game – Our Time" and called for fans across Europe to organise visibility events such as stadium choreographies to demonstrate solidarity of fans for so-called "fan-friendly" kick-off times . They took place in 2010.

The second European stadium action days were organised in May 2011 under the motto "Save Fan Culture" and mainly addressed the issue of safety and security measures that fans across Europe, from the perspective of FSE representatives, often consider overzealous and too restrictive.

Each of the European stadium action days facilitated by FSE was formally endorsed by different fans groups and initiatives from more than 10 countries who put their names on the list of supporters and organised respective visibility activities on matchdays.

In 2010, in Sweden, the "Our Game – Our Time" campaign was highly supported by Swedish fans and ultimately lead to the supporting Swedish fans being offered by their national Football Association to be consulted on the arrangement of kick-off times in Swedish professional football.

=== Fanzine – Revive the Roar! ===
FSE is producing a yearly fanzine called Revive the Roar!. Until 2016 six issues have been published, including a media guide for fans and legal advice for supporters compiled by lawyers for 10 different countries.

=== Institutional lobbying work ===
FSE engages with various institutions to provide the fans' perspective in the framework of institutional decision-making processes affecting fans, mainly at European level.

Since 2009, FSE holds an Observer Seat in the Standing Committee of the European Convention on Spectator Violence and Misbehaviour at Sports Events (T-RV) of the Council of Europe. In 2012, FSE was invited by the European Commission as an observer to the EU Expert Group on Good Governance.

Other institutional platforms have also consulted FSE and sought the support or expert input of the fan organisation, mainly on matters related to safety and security, such as the EU Football Experts Think Tank on a European training project of football police officers to foster innovative policing strategies of football matches with a focus on de-escalation and communication.

As part of their work in this area, FSE also holds meetings and seeks support and visibility for its European or its members activities at local level from national Football Associations and local authorities and football clubs and media, e.g. in the context of the organisation of the European Football Fans' Congresses or in the area of individual case work on member enquiries.

== Publications ==
- REVIVE THE ROAR! special edition – The vision of Football Supporters Europe
- REVIVE THE ROAR! No 2 – The FSE Media guide
- REVIVE THE ROAR! No 3 – KNOW YOUR RIGHTS! Vol.1
- Supporters Charters in Europe – A Handbook for Supporters, Clubs Associations and Leagues (2013)
- Fans’ Embassies – A Handbook
- EFFC 2008 Report
- EFFC 2009 Report
- EFFC 2010 Report
- EFFC 2011 Report
- EFFC 2012 Report

== See also ==
- Football Supporters Federation
- Supporters Direct
- Football Against Racism in Europe (FARE)
- UEFA
