= Supporters' trust =

In British sports, a supporters' trust is a formal, democratic and not-for-profit organisation of fans who attempt to strengthen the influence of supporters over the running of the club they support. There are over 140 supporters' trusts across England, Wales and Scotland and the majority of these are affiliated to football clubs, however trusts also exist for Rugby league and Rugby Union clubs.

With government and with cross-party support, Supporters Direct was established to encourage the formation of supporters' trusts to promote democratic supporter ownership. Supporters Direct encourages these bodies to be formed as Industrial and Provident Societies (IPSs) and assists with their formation, legal and start-up costs.

Supporters' trusts were commonly founded in response to financial crises which threaten the future of a team, as was the case at Chesterfield, Lincoln City, York City, and Real Oviedo. Their involvement has reportedly ensured the survival of over 20 different clubs entering into administration, particularly during the period of crisis as a result of the collapse of ITV Digital. Supporters' trusts are now more commonly founded in order to increase influence at clubs through a financial stake in the club.

The first trust established was at Northampton Town in January 1992. The largest is the Manchester United Supporters Trust, which used to be known as Shareholders United and currently has over 200,000 members. Other large trusts for clubs such as Newcastle United, Leeds, Exeter City, Dundee United, Reading, Spurs and Glasgow Rangers have between 3,000 and 10,000 members.

== Methods for influencing clubs ==
The main objective of a supporters' trust is to provide a vehicle for fans to influence the running of their club. This is achieved by a number of different strategies, including gaining control by fundraising to finance the acquisition of shares in the club or direct board representation.

=== Club ownership ===
The most effective method of influencing the running of a club is club ownership. In the UK, more than 110 supporters' trusts currently hold equity within their football clubs, while supporters' trusts have outright or majority ownership or control at two Football League clubs.

=== Board representation ===
Over 40 football clubs currently have supporter representation within the boards of their football clubs, such as the Rangers Supporters Trust at Rangers F.C., Lincoln City Supporters' Trust at Lincoln City F.C., ArabTRUST at Dundee United F.C., the Oldham Athletic Supporters Trust and the Swans Trust at Swansea City A.F.C. The Bluebirds Trust at Barrow AFC have a board representation and are fundraising to purchase shares. However their formation is different from the vast majority of Trusts, they are not born from crisis but success; Barrow AFC were a members owned club but voted to become a privately owned club. Barrow-born Texan businessman Paul Casson of Casson-Mark (C-Mark) Corp. purchased the club in the Summer of 2014. In Real Oviedo's case, when the club was about to go bankrupt, the club started putting shares up for sale to people across the world to help the club. Thousand of people invested, including 2nd richest man Carlos Slim and YouTuber Spencer Owen (aka Spencer F.C). As was the case for Ebbsfleet United.

About 100 football trusts currently have shares in their clubs.

There are many Rugby League supporters' trusts currently in the UK who run and operate their respective clubs, such as Rochdale Hornets for example, likewise, so do some rugby union clubs, for example Friends of Newport Rugby, representing Newport RFC.

== See also ==
- Supporters Direct
