= Independent Football Commission =

Independent football regulatory body

The Independent Football Commission (IFC) operated from 2002 to 2008 in England as an independent body within football's regulatory framework.

== Activities ==
The IFC scrutinised and monitored the performance of the Football Association, the FA Premier League and the Football League and issued publicly available reports on its findings.

== Funding ==
The Independent Football Commission was funded by grants from the three sport governing bodies.

The IFC has been replaced by the Independent Football Ombudsman (IFO), who will act as the final stage in football’s complaints procedure.

== See also ==
- British Football Association
