= Supporters Direct =

Organization

- Formation: January 2000
- Location: London
- Region served: United Kingdom
- Chief Executive: Ashley Brown
- Website: www.supporters-direct.org

Supporters Direct was an umbrella organisation set up originally by the British government (with cross-party support) to provide support and assistance for its member trusts to secure a greater level of accountability and deliver democratic representation within football clubs and within football's governing structures. Its first managing director was Brian Lomax, founder of the first supporters' trust at Northampton Town F.C. Supporters Direct also worked in other sports, most notably rugby league, as well as ice hockey. It was also funded by UEFA to work in football across Europe.

Amongst other things, Supporters Direct promoted the value of supporter and community engagement and helped supporters' trusts to secure influence and become a constructive voice in how their club is run. There are now over 200 supporters' trusts in the UK; clubs owned in partnership with supporters' trusts such as Swansea City A.F.C. and over 50 clubs owned by their supporters including Enfield Town FC, the first ever supporter owned football club in the United Kingdom, AFC Wimbledon, Exeter City F.C., Newport County and Wrexham F.C.

Existing as a Community Benefit Society, Supporters Direct was owned by its members and funded by a combination of the Fans Fund of the Football Stadia Improvement Fund, The RFL, UEFA. the Scottish Government, and member trust subscriptions. The consultancy Club Development allowed SD to expand its work in other sports at all levels of the game.

Unfortunately SD ran into some financial difficulties and was placed under pressure by the Fans Fund (which is run by the Premier League to merge back office operations with the Football Supporters Federation. Some felt that this was due to Supporters Direct often being critical of the way football is governed. However, on 28 July 2018 a full merger was approved by both organisations at their AGMs. On 22 November the merger was finalised at an EGM with the former FSF chair elected as chair of the newly merged Football Supporters' Association.

== Competitions ==
=== The Brian Lomax Supporters Direct Cup ===
The Brian Lomax Supporters Direct Cup is an annual invitational, pre-season friendly competition established by Supporters Direct. The cup is competed for between supporter-owned clubs and was first won by AFC Wimbledon, who beat Enfield Town, 3–2, on 12 August 2002 at Cheshunt. Other winners have been AFC Telford United, Brentford, Enfield Town and FC United of Manchester. AFC Wimbledon have featured six times in the match and FC United made their fifth appearance in 2011.

In 2013, the Supporters Direct Cup featured a fixture between Scottish sides for the first time, with Dunfermline Athletic going head to head against Heart of Midlothian at East End Park on 13 July. Both sides at the time were in administration however, Dunfermline Athletic have since exited administration and are owned by fans group, Pars United. Hearts won the match 2–1.

The cup itself was paid for by subscriptions from supporters' trusts and individual fans, and is inscribed with Jock Stein's maxim, "Football without fans is nothing." In the spirit of the fixture, gate receipts from the match are split between competing clubs.

==== Finals ====
Date	Winner	Scorers	Runner-up	Scorers	Score	Venue	Attendance
12 August 2002	AFC Wimbledon	Sheerin, Cooper, Sidwell	Enfield Town	Alleyne, St Hilaire	3–2	Cheshunt Stadium	521
2003	Not held						
20 July 2004	Brentford	Burton, Peters	AFC Wimbledon	–	2–0	Griffin Park	2,562
23 July 2005	AFC Wimbledon	Crace	F.C. United of Manchester	–	1–0	Kingsmeadow	3,301
22 July 2006	F.C. United of Manchester	Brown, Torpey	AFC Wimbledon	Barnes	2–1	Gigg Lane	2,136
4 August 2007	Enfield Town	Edmunds	Cambridge City	Midgley	1–1	Goldsdown Road	244
19 July 2008	Brentford	Connell, Elder	AFC Wimbledon	Main	2–1	Kingsmeadow	1,361
25 July 2009	AFC Wimbledon	Judge, Rapson	F.C. United of Manchester	–	2–0	Kingsmeadow	1,772
24 July 2010	AFC Telford United	Brown, Meechan	F.C. United of Manchester	–	2–0	New Bucks Head	803
16 July 2011	Chester	Ormrod, Brown	F.C. United of Manchester	Neville	2–1	Deva Stadium	1,927
8 July 2012	Enfield Town	Kirby, Hope (2)	Wrexham	Salathiel	3–1	Queen Elizabeth II Stadium	306
27 July 2013	Enfield Town	Wallace, Hope (2), Campbell (2), Osei, O'Brien, Green	YB SK Beveren	Vaerenberg (2)	8–2	Queen Elizabeth II Stadium	330
2 August 2014	Merthyr Town	McLaggon, Taylor, McDonald	Wrexham	Terrell, Bell	3–2	Penydarren Park	
1 August 2015	F.C. United of Manchester/Wrexham	Fallon (F.C. United), Smith (Wrexham)	None	–	1–1	Broadhurst Park	2,022
28 July 2016	Ton Pentre	Reed (2), Jacka, Shepherd, Morris	Newport County	–	5–0	Ynys Park	
14 July 2017	Exeter City	Taylor, Harley	Bath City	–	2–0	Twerton Park	330
8 August 2018	Enfield Town	Hockney (3), Blackman (pen.)	Clapton Community	—	4–0	Queen Elizabeth II Stadium	250

=== Supporters Direct Shield ===
The inaugural winners of the Shield were Scarborough Athletic who beat Merthyr Town 2–0 on 24 July 2010 at AFC Telford United.

==== Finals ====
Date	Winner	Scorers	Runner-up	Scorers	Score	Venue	Attendance
24 July 2010	Scarborough Athletic	Phillips, Gibson	Merthyr Town		2–0	New Bucks Head	803
8 July 2012	Lewes	Breach	Fisher		1–0	Queen Elizabeth Stadium	306
13 July 2013	1874 Northwich	Hendley, Stewart, Wilding	AFC Rushden & Diamonds		3–0	Select Security Stadium	130
30 July 2014	AFC Rushden & Diamonds	Gearing, Dunkley	Hinckley	O'Connell, Facey	2–2 (4–2 pens)	Dog & Duck Stadium	301
25 July 2015	Tonbridge Angels	Blewden, Miles, Elder, Whitnell, Parkinson	Fisher		5–0	Longmead Stadium	165
14 July 2018	Merthyr Town		City of Liverpool		4–2	Penydarren Park	
23 July 2019	Chester	Dudley(2, pen.), Grand, Elliott	1874 Northwich	Hare	1–4	Offside Trust Stadium	361

== See also ==
- Supporters' trust
- Football Supporters Europe
