= Football Supporters' Association =

Organization

The FSA
- The Football Supporters' Association
- Founded: 2018
- Location(s): England and Wales, United Kingdom
- Members: 500,000+
- Key people: Kevin Miles, Chief executive Tom Greatrex, Chair; Chris Paouros, Vice-chair
- Affiliations: FSE, The FA
- Website: www.thefsa.org.uk/

The Football Supporters' Association (The FSA) is the national, democratic, representative body for football supporters in England and Wales. They are the leading advocates for supporter ownership, better fan engagement, cheaper ticket prices, the choice to stand at the match (safe standing), protecting fan rights, good governance, diversity, and all types of supporter empowerment across both the men's and women's game.

The FSA's chair is Tom Greatrex, and its vice-chair is Chris Paouros, both of whom sit as supporters' representatives on The FA Council.

== Founding and membership ==
The organisation was formed after the merger of two national football supporters' organisations, the Football Supporters' Federation and Supporters Direct, was agreed to on 22 November 2018. The name of the new organisation was announced on 6 June 2019.

The FSA represents more than 500,000 members made up of individual fans and more than 300 affiliated and associated supporters' organisations from every club in the professional game and many more throughout the whole footballing pyramid. Membership of the FSA is free to all fans, providing they promote the cause of diversity, oppose discrimination, reject violence and promote a positive culture of fair play and goodwill between all football supporters.

== Work with stakeholders ==
The FSA regularly meets with the football authorities and the Department for Digital, Culture, Media and Sport to discuss a wide range of issues relating to the concerns of football supporters.

They are the structured dialogue partners of the Premier League, EFL and the National League, facilitating dialogue between those organisations and supporters. They also partner with football's anti-discrimination charity Kick It Out on the Fans for Diversity campaign, and with The FA, the Football Association of Wales and the Foreign, Commonwealth and Development Office on fans' embassies for England and Wales matches overseas.

They have regular dialogue with other groups, including the Professional Footballers' Association, the Independent Football Ombudsman and Police Match Commanders, among others, and are founder-members of Football Supporters Europe (FSE), working with other national and trans-national organisations as dialogue partners with UEFA. The FSA's chief executive, Kevin Miles, is an elected committee member of FSE.

The FSA is also secretariat to the All Party Parliamentary Group for Football Supporters.

== Campaigns and other work ==
The FSA promotes the value of supporter and community engagement and helps supporters' trusts to secure influence and become a constructive voice in how their club is run. There are around 50 clubs owned by their supporters including the first ever supporter-owned football club in the United Kingdom, AFC Wimbledon, Exeter City, and Newport County, as well as clubs part-owned in partnership with supporters' trusts such as Swansea City.

The Stand Up For Choice campaign, previously known as the Safe Standing campaign, has received widespread political backing. At the 2019 UK general election all three major English political parties included a commitment to move towards safe standing in their manifestos. Work on pilots of standing areas in the top flight which were to be explored after the publication of the Department for Digital, Culture, Media and Sport’s Rapid Evidence Assessment into the all-seater policy in 2019 were halted by the COVID-19 pandemic in the United Kingdom and the subsequent restrictions on supporters attending matches.

In 2020, partly in response to the COVID-19 pandemic and its effects on the game but also as a result of long-standing finance and governance issues, the FSA launched the Sustain the Game! campaign. It calls for urgent action from the authorities to protect clubs throughout the country, for greater transparency and independent financial controls, and for the Government to deliver on its manifesto commitment of a 'fan-led review of football governance'. The campaign received cross-party political support, as well as backing from hundreds of supporter organisations and football industry figures such as Jamie Carragher and Henry Winter. The campaign launch came two months ahead of the divisive and unpopular 'Project Big Picture' proposals, which would have seen sweeping changes to the organisation of English football and which were ultimately unanimously rejected.

At its 2020 AGM the organisation formalised the creation of a network to represent supporters in the women's game, on the back of work over the preceding 18 months which saw the creation of more than 25 supporter groups throughout the top four divisions of women's football.

In 2022, local football supporters in Bury, Greater Manchester were urged to vote in a poll, facilitated by the FSA, regarding a potential merger of the supporters groups of Bury F.C. and Bury A.F.C. The FSA said there was no "viable and sustainable alternative to the merger", which, if approved, could potentially see the eventual return of professional football to the town's Gigg Lane stadium following Bury F.C.'s expulsion from the EFL in August 2019.

== FSA Awards ==
The Football Supporters’ Association Player of the Year is an annual award, presented at the FSA Awards ceremony in association with 'BeGambleAware', given to the player who is adjudged to have had the best year in all of the divisions of Welsh and English football. The award has been presented since 2013, when the inaugural winner was Liverpool striker Luis Suárez.

The most recent winners of the award are Frida Maanum of Arsenal and Mohamed Salah of Liverpool. Winners are selected by public vote following a nominations process.

The table indicates where the winning player also won one or more of the other major "player of the year" awards in English football, namely the Professional Footballers' Association's Players' Player of the Year award (PPY), the Football Writers' Association's Footballer of the Year award (FWA), the PFA Fans' Player of the Year award (FPY), the Premier League Player of the Season award (PPS), and the PFA Young Player of the Year award (YPY).

Year		Female Player	Club	Also won	Notes
2016	(Netherlands)	Sari van Veenendaal	Arsenal		
2017	(England)	Jill Scott	Manchester City		
2018	(England)	Beth Mead	Arsenal		
2019	(Netherlands)	Vivianne Miedema	Arsenal	PFA	
2020	(Netherlands)	Vivianne Miedema (2)	Arsenal	FWA, LFA	
2021	(Netherlands)	Vivianne Miedema (3)	Arsenal	BBC, PFA	
2022	(England)	Beth Mead (2)	Arsenal	BBC	
2023	(Norway)	Frida Maanum	Arsenal	PFA	
2024	(England)	Lauren Hemp	Manchester City		
2025	(England)	Alessia Russo	Arsenal	FWA	

Year		Male Player	Club	Also won	Notes
2013	(Uruguay)	Luis Suárez^{†}	Liverpool	FWA, PPY	Inaugural winner of the award
2014	(Argentina)	Sergio Agüero^{†}	Manchester City		
2015	(Chile)	Alexis Sánchez^{†}	Arsenal	FPY	
2016	(Brazil)	Philippe Coutinho^{†}	Liverpool		
2017	(England)	Harry Kane^{†}	Tottenham Hotspur		
2018	(Egypt)	Mohamed Salah^{†}	Liverpool	FWA, PPY, FPY, PPS, FSF	
2019	(Netherlands)	Virgil van Dijk	Liverpool	PPY, PPS	
2020	(Portugal)	Bruno Fernandes	Manchester United		
2021	(Egypt)	Mohamed Salah (2)	Liverpool	FPY, FSF	
2022	(Belgium)	Kevin De Bruyne	Manchester City	PPS	
2023	(Egypt)	Mohamed Salah (3)	Liverpool		
2024	(England)	Cole Palmer	Chelsea	YPY, FPY	
2025	(England)	Declan Rice	Arsenal		

†	Indicates the award was previous the Football Supporters' Federation (FSF) Player of the Year Award.

Awards are issued in a variety of other categories, including pundits, podcasters, writers and other football media.

== See also ==
- Football in the United Kingdom
- Football Supporters Europe
- Football Supporters' Federation
