= Football Supporters' Federation =

Organisation representing association football fans in England and Wales

FSF
- The Football Supporters' Federation
- Merged into: Football Supporters' Association
- Founded: 2002
- Defunct: 2019
- Location(s): England and Wales, United Kingdom
- Members: 500,000+
- Key people: Kevin Miles, Chief executive Malcolm Clark, Chair
- Affiliations: FSE, The FA
- Website: www.fsf.org.uk/

The Football Supporters' Federation (FSF) was an organisation representing football fans in England and Wales. It campaigned across a range of issues and supports fan representation on clubs' boards, lower ticket prices, and the introduction of safe standing areas at grounds in the top two tiers of English football. The organisation was free to join and acted as a singular voice for football fans.

The FSF represented more than 500,000 members made up of individual fans and affiliated supporters' organisations from every club in the professional game and footballing pyramid.

The FSF agreed in November 2018 to merge with Supporters Direct, and in June 2019 both were superseded by the new Football Supporters' Association.

== Founding ==
The FSF was founded in 2002 after the amalgamation of two separate bodies, the Football Supporters' Association (FSA) and the National Federation of Supporters' Clubs (NATFED). The FSF was a democratically structured organisation with a National Council made up of elected individuals, officers and divisional representatives. The FSF's current chair is Malcolm Clarke, who also sits as the supporters' representative on The Football Association (FA)'s Council.

== Functions ==
The Federation had regular meetings with the football authorities and the Department for Culture, Media and Sport, discussing a wide range of issues, many of them placed on the agenda by the FSF to take forward their policies or in response to concerns raised by supporters. The FSF also had detailed meetings on specific topics with the relevant authorities or other bodies such as the Premier League, FA, Football League, Professional Footballers' Association, Independent Football Ombudsman and the Police Match Commanders. They also met with government and the All-party parliamentary group on football of MPs when necessary.

The organisation regularly took specific complaints and cases which were raised with it by individual members or affiliated organisations and they encouraged the participation of all supporters in this process. The FSF was free to join and held an annual conference called Fans' Parliament where members could make their views known. At the 2010 Fans' Parliament, a national policy was adopted to oppose parts of the Football (Disorder) Act 2000 which was introduced by the Government to prevent certain football supporters from attending matches and travelling overseas, by imposing Football Banning Orders.

In the August 2010 issue No.22 of The Football Supporter - an FSF publication - the FSF Chairman explained why they took this stance whilst maintaining that the organisation is totally opposed to any form of football violence. "We have major concerns about the use of the so-called Section 14(b) provisions (also known as Football Banning Orders or FBOs) for gaining civil banning orders against football fans. These cases are heard in a civil not criminal court which means that there’s no jury, the burden of proof is lower and the police can introduce evidence of previous convictions which need not even be in a football context".

The organisation also helped promote the work of its affiliated supporters' organisations and supported the Internet Football Association's annual tournament WorldNET since 2009 and has provided a free programme for all participants and spectators of that tournament.

In 2017, a unanimous motion to promote boycotts of The Sun, proposed by Spirit of Shankly and supported by all 20 Premier League clubs and around 50 other football teams passed at the organisation's annual summit. The boycott is in response to the newspaper's false claims in the days after the Hillsborough disaster and its response since, and followed a 2016 inquest around the incident.

== FSF Player of the Year Award ==
The Football Supporters' Federation Player of the Year is an annual award, presented at the FSF Awards ceremony in association with William Hill, given to the player who is adjudged to have had the best year in all of the divisions of Welsh and English football. The award has been presented since 2013, when the inaugural winner was Liverpool striker Luis Suárez. The award later became the Football Supporters’ Association Player of the Year award in 2019 upon the new organisation name being decided as the Football Supporters' Association (FSA) after the merger between the Football Supports' Federation (FSF) and Supporters Direct (SD). Winners were selected by public vote following a nominations process.

The table indicates where the winning player also won one or more of the other major "player of the year" awards in English football, namely the Professional Footballers' Association's Players' Player of the Year award (PPY), the Football Writers' Association's Footballer of the Year award (FWA), the PFA Fans' Player of the Year award (FPY), the Premier League Player of the Season award (PPS), and the PFA Young Player of the Year award (YPY).

| Year | | Player | Club | Also won | Notes |
|---|---|---|---|---|---|
| 2013 | (Uruguay) | Luis Suárez | Liverpool | FWA, PPY | Inaugural winner of the award |
| 2014 | (Argentina) | Sergio Agüero | Manchester City | | |
| 2015 | (Chile) | Alexis Sánchez | Arsenal | FPY | |
| 2016 | (Brazil) | Philippe Coutinho | Liverpool | | |
| 2017 | (England) | Harry Kane | Tottenham Hotspur | | |
| 2018 | (Egypt) | Mohamed Salah | Liverpool | FWA, PPY, FPY, PPS, FSA | |

Awards are issued in a variety of other categories, including pundits, podcasters, writers and other football media.

== See also ==
- Football in the United Kingdom
- Football Supporters Europe
- Football Supporters' Association
