= 2020 in British radio =

This is a list of events taking place in 2020 relating to radio in the United Kingdom.

== Events ==
=== January ===
- 3 January – Smooth Radio announces that Jenni Falconer has joined the network to present the Breakfast Show in London, replacing Gary King. The show will also be available on Smooth Extra, while Falconer will also present a national Saturday morning show for Smooth.
- 5 January – John Humphrys begins to present a weekly Sunday afternoon programme on Classic FM, with Charlotte Hawkins moving to the Smooth Classics at Seven slot.
- 15 January –
  - The BBC announces a further switching off of MW transmitters. The switch-offs, being done as a cost-cutting measure, will see the end of MW transmissions of Radios Cornwall, Newcastle, Merseyside, Solent, Solent for Dorset, BBC Three Counties Radio and BBC Radio York. Also, BBC Radio Cumbria will stop broadcasting on MW in Whitehaven and BBC Radio Norfolk's Norwich MW transmitter will go silent. In addition, BBC Radio Scotland will stop broadcasting on MW in Aberdeen and BBC Radio Wales will lose some MW coverage in central Wales. A total of 18 MW transmitters are to go. The transmitters will broadcast a retune advice loop prior to full switch-off in early April.
  - In a speech at Cardiff, BBC Director-General Tony Hall confirms plans to make major changes to BBC Local Radio.
- 23 January – The BBC announces that Brexitcast will be renamed Newscast after the United Kingdom leaves the European Union on 31 January.
- 27 January – Ofcom says it will take no action over comments Jo Brand made about throwing battery acid on an edition of Radio 4's Heresy in June 2019, saying they were "unlikely to encourage or incite the commission of a crime".
- 29 January –
  - BBC News announces it will shed 450 posts, including roles from Newsnight and BBC Radio 5 Live, as part of £80m worth of savings being made by the BBC.
  - News Corp, owners of The Times, announce plans to launch talk radio station Times Radio later in the year.
- 30 January – Sarah Sands announces she is standing down as editor of BBC Radio 4's The Today Programme after three years in the post.

=== February ===
- 1 February – The final edition of Brexitcast, recorded as a podcast for radio and titled "Over and Out!", is released.
- 4 February – The BBC announces plans to launch twenty new radio shows on its BBC Sounds platform.
- 6 February –
  - Audience figures released by RAJAR indicate that Zoe Ball's breakfast show on Radio 2 was heard by 8.25 million listeners during the final quarter of 2019, an increase of 335,000 on the previous quarter, and reversing a six-month period of decline in the show's listeners.
  - Newscast makes its debut on BBC Radio 5 Live.
  - BBC Radio 5 Live confirms that Dotun Adebayo will take over from Rhod Sharp as its weekday overnight presenter from April. The changes are subsequently delayed because of the COVID-19 pandemic, with the new programme beginning in July.
- 20 February – Absolute Radio announces the launch of Absolute Radio 20s, its latest decades-themed radio station.
- 27 February – Controller of BBC Sounds, Jonathan Wall, announces the launch of a new 24-hour 'Radio 1 Dance' stream on the service in the spring.

=== March ===
- 12 March – Global closes Heart Extra and Smooth Extra on DAB and the Global Player. They are replaced the station with the national feed of both Heart and Smooth
- 13 March – BBC Radio 1's Big Weekend, scheduled for the Spring Bank Holiday Weekend, is cancelled due to the COVID-19 pandemic in the United Kingdom. Organisers subsequently run an alternative event called Big Weekend UK 2020, with acts appearing on one of five virtual stages and performed from their homes; the event also features past performances from previous Big Weekend events.
- 14 March – Anneka Rice takes a break from her Radio 2 show for a while.
- 15 March – Paul O'Grady takes a break from his Radio 2 show for a while.
- 17 March – The BBC announces major changes to the schedule across the network due to the coronavirus pandemic. On radio the BBC World Service programmes The World This Week, World Update and Weekend are all suspended. Radio news summaries on Radio 2, Radio 3, Radio 4 and Radio 5 Live are merged into a single output, with BBC 6 Music using the same script. The BBC Asian Network and Newsbeat work together to maintain production of stories. Week in Westminster which broadcasts on Radio 4 is also suspended.
- 18 March – Leeds-based radio news bulletin provider Radio News Hub is producing a daily ten-minute round-up of COVID-19 news from around the world that will be made available to radio stations free of charge.
- 19 March –
  - Sounds of the 90s launches on BBC Radio 2 with Fearne Cotton and to mark the launch, Radio 2 plays 90s music throughout the following day.
  - Rhod Sharp presents BBC Radio 5 Live's overnight programme Up All Night for the final time. He had presented the programme for more than 25 years, which launched when 5 Live started broadcasting in March 1994.
- 20 March – After three years at Heart, Sian Welby switches to Capital Breakfast which is hosted by Roman Kemp and co-hosted by Sonny Jay. Welby replaces Vick Hope, who left on 21 February.
- 23 March – In order to prioritise resources in response to the coronavirus pandemic, BBC Radio 5 Live suspends overnight programmes between 1 a.m. and 5 a.m. and carries the output of BBC Radio London, whuch is also broadcast across other BBC Local Radio stations.
- 26 March – At 8pm, millions of people around the country take part in a "Clap for Carers" tribute, applauding the NHS and other care workers. The event is aired by radio and television outlets.
- 27 March – The last programme billed under the Up All Night title in the BBC Radio 5 Live schedule is aired from 1am–5am, and presented by Dotun Adebayo.
- 28 March –
  - As part of the BBC's Make a Difference campaign, BBC Local Radio announces that it has teamed up with manufacturers, retailers and the social isolation charity WaveLength to give away free DAB radios to vulnerable people over the age of 70, beginning on 30 March.
  - Huey Morgan takes a break from his Radio 2 broadcasting for a while, and The Radio 2 Rockshow with Johnnie Walker takes a break from the airwaves for a while.
- 29 March –
  - The BBC reveals that Radio 4 soap The Archers will include its first coronavirus related story in early May.
  - Claudia Winkleman and Angela Scanlon both take a break from their Radio 2 shows for a while.

=== April ===
- 2 April – At 9:00 am, BBC Radios 1, 2, 1Xtra, 6 Music and Asian Network join together for The Great British Singalong, a broadcast aimed at getting the whole nation singing during the coronavirus lockdown. Presenters from each station take turns to play tracks suggested by members of the public who can then sing along with them.
- 4 April – Digital station Love Sport Radio announces it is suspending programming because of the COVID-19 pandemic.
- 12 April – Radio 2's Friday Night Is Music Night is moved to Sundays for a while.
- 18 April – Radio 4's The Archers will air a series of episodes from its archives featuring key moments from the series due to difficulty recording episodes during the coronavirus lockdown. The episodes will be broadcast for three weeks from 3 May.
- 30 April – The British Library is to archive hundreds of essays submitted to BBC Radio 4's PM programme by listeners detailing their coronavirus experiences. The Covid Chronicles, launched in March, has seen listeners submit their accounts of their lives during the lockdown restrictions, some of which have been broadcast.
- April – Jack 3, branded as Jack 3 & Chill, replaces Jack 2 on 107.9 MHz in Oxfordshire. The station, which broadcasts easy listening music, had been on air on DAB in the county since 2017.

=== May ===
- 7 May – Bauer Radio announces plans to close Liverpool station Radio City Talk.
- 8 May –
  - Europe's Biggest Dance Show takes place, with Radio 1 representing the UK for the second time.
  - Absolute Radio broadcasts Absolute Radio 40s on its 1215 MW frequency and online to mark the 75th anniversary of VE Day.
- 12 May – Radio 3 announces plans to resume live concerts from June, having suspended them at the start of the COVID-19 lockdown. A series of lunchtime concerts at London's Wigmore Hall will be held without an audience present.
- 15 May – Radio 1 confirms that its presenter, Maya Jama, has left the station, with her final show broadcast on 3 May.
- 18 May – At 10:59 am most of the UK's radio stations join together for the Mental Health Minute, a one-minute broadcast that seeks to raise mental health awareness and featuring a number of famous names, including the Duke and Duchess of Cambridge. BBC Radio Four joins the broadcast for the first time this year.
- 25 May – The Archers returns to Radio 4 after a three-week break, with new episodes adapted for the lockdown restrictions. Actors are recording at home and the series features a series of monologues offering a glimpse into the characters' private thoughts rather than the usual interactions with each other.
- 27 May – Bauer announces that the majority of the stations it acquired from UKRD, Lincs, Wireless and Celador will be joining the Greatest Hits Radio network from September, clustered to provide regional programming outside of network hours. Four of the acquired stations will join the Hits Radio network, retaining local names and a daily breakfast show, and three stations – Lincs FM, Pirate FM and SAM FM Bristol – will continue as largely standalone stations.
- 30 May – Saxophonist and broadcaster YolanDa Brown joins Jazz FM to present the Saturday afternoon programme YolanDa Brown on Saturday.

=== June ===
- 1 June – An episode of Radio 4's The Infinite Monkey Cage becomes the first BBC programme to be recorded with a live audience at home.
- 2 June –
  - BBC Radio 1 presenter Clara Amfo wins praise for a candid and emotional on air speech about the murder of George Floyd and her own mental health.
  - The launch date for Times Radio is confirmed for 29 June, while the station's schedule is also published. Among those to join the presenting team are former Home Secretary Amber Rudd who will present a programme alongside her daughter, Flora Gill.
  - BBC Radio 5 Live Sports Extra repeats live coverage of the 2019 Cricket World Cup.
- 7 June – Paul O'Grady returns to Radio 2.
- 11 June – Nigel Farage leaves his presenting role at LBC with immediate effect.
- 20 June – Huey Morgan returns to Radio 2.
- 21 June – Angela Scanlon returns to Radio 2.
- 24 June – Chris Evans relaunches his 500 Words children's writing competition on Virgin Radio.
- 29 June – Times Radio launches at 6 am.
- 30 June – Bauer switches off the MW transmitters which had been carrying Absolute Classic Rock since the start of 2019. Consequently, Bauer is no longer broadcasting on MW in the West Midlands.

=== July ===
- 2 July – In a bid to save £25m by 2022, the BBC announces plans to cut 450 jobs in its regional television news and current affairs programming, local radio and online news services in England. These will include restructuring some regional programmes, and making permanent changes to local radio that were introduced during the COVID-19 outbreak.
- 6 July –
  - BBC Radio 5 Live stops relaying overnight broadcasting from BBC Radio London, and launches a new weekday phone-in discussion show presented by Dotun Adebayo from 1am–5am. The World Football Phone-In and Virtual Jukebox, regular features from his weekend presenting role on Up All Night, are carried over to the new programme, which is simulcast on local radio.
  - The 5am hour on BBC Local Radio is an England-wide simulcast of the first hour of BBC Radio London's breakfast show, which is presented by Jason Rosam.
- 8 July – Samantha Moy is appointed head of BBC Radio 6 Music, replacing Paul Rogers.
- 12 July – Don Black announces the new series of his Sunday evening Radio 2 show will be his last and he is to leave the station in October 2020.
- 15 July – Alice Levine announces she is to leave BBC Radio 1, with her last show airing on 9 August.
- 16 July – Bauer announces that Radio Aire will close on 1 September after 39 years on air. Its frequency will be transferred to Greatest Hits Radio.
- 24 July – Dame Jenni Murray announces she is leaving Radio 4's Woman's Hour after 33 years; she will present her final edition of the programme on 1 October.
- 25 July – First radio broadcast from BBC Cymru Wales New Broadcasting House in Cardiff, by BBC Radio Cymru 2 host Daniel Glyn.
- 31 July-2 August – Radio 1's Dance Weekend took place to fill what would have been the 25th year in Ibiza

=== August ===
- 8 August – The BBC 1Xtra presenter Sideman quits the station because of the BBC's use of the N-word during a report about a racially motivated attack on a local news programme.
- 13 August – Radio 1 announces that Vick Hope will join the station to present the Sunday afternoon Life Hacks show alongside Katie Thistleton. Hope will also present Official Charts: First Look, also on Sundays, as part of a network revamp from 1 September.
- 25 August – Bauer Radio launches Magic 100% Christmas, attributing the early launch to a need to lift the spirits of the UK; the station is available online only this year.
- 28 August – Bauer launches Hits Radio Pride, aimed at the LGBTQ+ community. This is the first time that a major radio broadcaster in the United Kingdom has launched a station that is targeted to the LGBTQ+ community.
- 31 August –
  - Bauer closes Leeds station Radio Aire after 39 years on air. Its frequency is, from the following day, used to carry Greatest Hits Radio.
  - Hits Radio South Coast launches, thereby becoming the second FM station to be known on air as Hits Radio. The station had previously broadcast as The Breeze South Coast and the change is made following the purchase in 2019 of The Breeze network from Celador Radio.

=== September ===
- 1 September – The majority of the stations that Bauer Media acquired the previous year from UKRD, Lincs FM Group, Wireless Group and Celador Radio, join Greatest Hits Radio, clustered to provide regional programming outside of network hours, consisting of three hours each weekday teatime. All of the affected stations lose their individual station names.
- 4 September – The BBC confirms that Jane Garvey will leave Woman's Hour at the end of the year to present her own show on Radio 4 from 2021.
- 7 September –
  - Radio 5 Live presenter Emma Barnett is confirmed as the new presenter of Radio 4's Woman's Hour; she will succeed Jenni Murray and Jane Garvey who are both leaving the programme, and present from Mondays to Thursdays.
  - LBC launches its new series Call the Cabinet, giving listeners a chance to speak to a different cabinet member on each edition. The first programme features Matt Hancock, the Secretary of State for Health.
- 9 September – LBC unveils a new schedule for the autumn, including a new Sunday morning political discussion show for Tom Swarbrick.
- 17 September – Bauer Radio buys Radio Plymouth so it can extend its Greatest Hits Radio network.
- 23 September – MistaJam announces he is leaving BBC Radio 1 and BBC 1Xtra. He will be replaced on Drivetime by Reece Parkinson, while Radio 1's Dance Anthems will be presented by Charlie Hedges.
- 24 September –
  - Ofcom says it will not instruct the BBC to conduct a public interest test in relation to Radio 1 Dance, but will consider the market position of BBC Sounds in general after the commercial radio sector and All-Party Parliamentary Group on Commercial Radio both expressed doubt that the service is offering something different to commercial radio.
  - Bletchley Girls, a World War II play produced by Jenny Wren Productions, is made available free to hospital and community radio stations. The play was scheduled to tour several theatres in Gloucestershire through May and June, but was adapted for radio after the closure of venues due to the COVID-19 pandemic meant it could not be performed.
- 25 September – Bauer Media creates PodPlay, a platform to create and publish its podcasts.
- 26 September – Simon Phillips joins Jazz FM to present Weekend Breakfast.
- 28 September –
  - Frank Skinner's Poetry Podcast returns to Absolute Radio for a second series.
  - Talksport launches a new 18 month apprenticeship scheme to find three young people to become part of their production team.
  - Jamie East announces he is leaving Talkradio and Virgin Radio.
- 29 September –
  - BBC Radio 1 hires singer-songwriter YUNGBLUD to present a weekly podcast in which young music fans will speak about turning points in their lives.
  - Bauer Radio launches a campaign to support The Prince's Trust, spearheaded by Magic Radio.
- 30 September – Absolute Radio have signed Skunk Anansie lead singer Skin to present a ten part programme in which she plays music that has influenced her; the series begins in October.

=== October ===
- 1 October –
  - Dame Jenni Murray presents her final edition of Woman's Hour.
  - Global launches Capital Dance at 4pm, having signed MistaJam to present the drivetime show from Tuesdays to Saturdays.
- 3 October –
  - Global Radio launches its first multimedia television advertising campaign, with the minute-long commercial first airing during an edition of Britain's Got Talent on ITV.
  - Charlie Hedges takes over Radio 1's Dance Anthems.
- 4 October – Musician Gary Powell begins a four part series for Radio X exploring the influence of pioneering black musicians on indie rock and alternative music.
- 8 October –
  - Jenny Wilkes announces she is leaving the BBC after presenting at BBC Radio WM for 35 years.
  - Launch of Box Office Radio, an online station dedicated to songs from stage and theatre.
- 9 October –
  - BBC Radio 1 Dance launches on BBC Sounds at 6pm.
  - Absolute Radio replaces the final ad break of every hour between 10am and 4pm with a piece of instrumental music to encourage listeners to think about how they can help others. The move is part of Bauer Radio's Pledge Kindness campaign for World Mental Health Day.
- 10 October – On what would have been his 97th birthday, Radio 4 airs an evening of programmes dedicated to Nicholas Parsons, with a documentary and archive material featuring the presenter.
- 15 October – Times Radio begins a three-week television advertising campaign aimed at drawing listeners to the station in the run up to the US presidential election.
- 16 October – Smooth Radio switches off its mediumwave frequencies in Cardiff and Newport because the site from which they are transmitted is being redeveloped; Smooth continues to be available on AM in Wrexham and throughout Wales on DAB.
- 18 October – Actress Joanna Page joins BBC Radio Wales to present a Sunday morning show.
- 23 October –
  - James Purnell, the BBC's Director of Radio and Music, announces he will leave the post in November to take up a role at the University of the Arts London.
  - Radiocentre writes to the Government requesting additional support measures for the commercial radio sector as the COVID-19 tier regulations in England impact on local economies and businesses.
  - Europe's Biggest Dance Show returns for the 3rd time.
  - It is announced that Bauer Media has purchased The Revolution and that it will rebrand the station to Greatest Hits Radio by the end of 2020.
- 25 October – Heart Christmas returns two months to the day before Christmas Day.
- 26 October – Helen Thomas, the Controller of BBC Radio 2, is announced as the new Chair of the Radio Academy, with Nick Pitts from Jazz FM taking over as Deputy Chair. They will succeed Yvonne Thompson and John Dash in December.
- 29 October – Graham Torrington presents his final show for BBC Radio WM, having announced his intention to retire from broadcasting earlier in the year.
- 31 October – For the first time, KISS FM, Kisstory and KissFresh unite to broadcast the KISS Haunted House Party.

=== November ===
- 1 November –
  - BBC Radio 2 marks 50 years of music performances at the BBC with In Concert 50 that sees 50 performances made available to stream on BBC Sounds; ten video performances are also made available via BBC iPlayer.
  - Anila Dhami joins Sunrise Radio to present a weekly current affairs programme on Sundays.
- 3 November – Smooth Radio switches off its mediumwave frequencies in Luton and Bedford.
- 5 November – Dev Griffin announces he will leave Radio 1 and Radio 1Xtra after eighteen years, with his final day being on 20 December.
- 6 November – BBC Radio 1 announces schedule changes for 2021 that will include Radio 1 Breakfast with Greg James airing five days a week, and Adele Roberts taking over the weekend breakfast show.
- 8 November – The 39 BBC local radio stations feature a special Remembrance Sunday service led by the Anglican Bishop to the Forces, the Right Reverend Tim Thornton.
- 9 November – The 2020 Radio Academy Festival begins, this year held as a five-day online event.
- 10 November –
  - Ofcom approves two regional changes for Bauer Radio licences, allowing it to switch two licences to different regions.
  - A YouGov poll suggests that 38% of people prefer local radio stations over national stations, and are less likely to listen to podcasts.
- 11 November – Graham Norton announces he will leave his Saturday morning show on BBC Radio 2 before the end of the year.
- 15 November – Clare Teal announces her departure from Radio 2, with the final edition of her show, The Swing and Big Band Show, airing on 3 January 2021.
- 16 November –
  - Virgin Radio hires Graham Norton to present a weekend show, beginning in 2021.
  - Following the purchase of The Revolution by Bauer Media, the east Manchester station is closed and its frequency transferred to Greatest Hits Radio, thereby giving Greatest Hits Radio Manchester its first berth on FM.
- 17 November – The BBC announce plans to create temporary local radio services for areas such as Wolverhampton Bradford and Sunderland. They will not be fully fledged radio stations, but will provide content for local areas.
- 18 November –
  - Bauer Media has signed up to the kickstart scheme, a UK government scheme to help young people seeking their first role in the media industry.
  - Talksport have signed an exclusive deal with the England cricket team to broadcast coverage of their tour of South Africa, beginning later in November.
- 19 November – BBC Radio 1 announces plans to play an edited version of the Christmas song Fairytale of New York by The Pogues and Kirsty MacColl over the festive season, because it feels its audience may be offended by some of the lyrics.
- 23 November –
  - Claudia Winkleman is announced to replace Graham Norton when he leaves his Saturday morning show on BBC Radio 2.
  - Debut of Space is the Place on Jazz FM, a series of dramas about key moments in the lives of jazz legends, including Ella Fitzgerald and Miles Davis.
  - Radio executives Phil Riley and David Lloyd announce plans to launch Boom Radio, a station aimed at the baby boomer generation on DAB early in 2021; the station will initially be available in London, Birmingham, Bristol and Glasgow, and offer a mix of music, conversation and presenter personality.
- 25 November – Ofcom releases its annual diversity report into the socio-economic background of employees in the radio and television industry, and concludes that it remains poorly understood, although the industry is collecting more information than a year ago.
- 26 November –
  - BBC Local Radio scraps plans to introduce a syndicated late show.
  - The BBC announces the launch of BBC Radio Bradford, which will go on air in December.
- 27 November – Ahmed Hussain, the new Head of Station at BBC Asian Network, announces plans to introduce a new schedule from March 2021, including four new weekday programmes.

=== December ===
- 1 December –
  - The online station The VIP Lounge closes at 7am in preparation for the launch of Retro Sound, a community station that will serve South East Wales. VIP Lounge presenters are moved to a sister station, CBC.
  - At 5pm, Radio 1, Radio 1 Dance, 1Xtra, BBC Asian Network, Radio 2 and BBC 6 Music come together for The Christmas House Party, a syndicated show that launches their festive content.
  - Milton Keynes community station MKFM announces a ban on songs by Rita Ora after she broke COVID-19 restrictions by attending a party for her 30th birthday at a London restaurant during lockdown.
- 3 December –
  - Radio 1 announces a schedule of 33 guest presenters who will present shows between Christmas and New Year, including the station's first hard of hearing DJ.
  - Heart have signed Radio 1 presenter Dev Griffin to present a Saturday afternoon show on the network from 2 January 2021.
  - Greatest Hits Radio announces plans for a schedule shake up in January 2021, with Jenny Powell and Debbie Mac joining, and Andy Crane and Alex Lester moving to different time slots.
  - Capital Dance announces plans for a presented breakfast show from 4 January 2021, with Rio Fredrika presenting.
- 7 December –
  - BBC Radio Bradford launches on 774 kHz, with presenters including Rima Ahmed and Sanchez Payne.
  - Radio Biscuit, an online station launched in June, joins the Small Scale DAB+ trial in Aldershot and Woking, with a number of former Eagle Radio presenters joining the presenting line up.
- 8 December – Black Country Radio launches Black Country Christmas, a station playing non-stop Christmas hits to its local area.
- 9 December – Ofcom approves a format change for Sam FM Bristol enabling it to become part of the Hits Radio network.
- 10 December –
  - Emma Barnett presents her final mid-morning show for BBC Radio 5 Live before moving to Woman's Hour on Radio 4.
  - Bauer Radio seeks permission from Ofcom to move its recently acquired Plymouth licence from the West of England approved area to the South West England approved area, a move that would allow it to share content with other Bauer stations in the South West.
- 11 December –
  - BBC Radio 4 announces the return of Just a Minute in February 2021, with a guest presenter format.
  - V2 Radio begins online test transmissions in West Sussex; the station aims to provide a local radio service to the area after local station Spirit FM became part of the Greatest Hits Radio network.
- 14 December –
  - Radio X teams up with Campaign Against Living Miserably (CALM) to create a series of podcasts offering mental health support.
  - United DJs announces it will close on New Year's Day 2021 after three years on air.
- 16 December – Scala Radio have signed Midge Ure to present the evening show The Space from January 2021.
- 17 December –
  - Nadia Jae is confirmed as the new breakfast show presenter for BBC 1Xtra, having filled the role on a temporary basis since the previous presenter departed in July. The station also announces that Birmingham rapper Lady Leshurr will present the Saturday afternoon slot and new name Remi Burgz will be presenting Weekend Breakfast.
  - BBC Radio Wales announces a new schedule for January 2021 that will see BBC weather presenter Behnaz Akhgar presenting the afternoon show from Mondays to Thursdays. Current presenter Eleri Sion will continue with Fridays, while also co-presenting the late show from Mondays to Thursdays alongside Gabe Cameron. Comedian Kiri Pritchard-McLean will present a Sunday show.
- 18 December –
  - The media regulator Ofcom introduces a new set of rules for the radio and television industry to protect people appearing on radio and television programmes that requires radio and television stations to look after their welfare.
  - Emma Britton presents her final breakfast show for BBC Radio Bristol after 13 years with the station.
  - Radio 2 launches a listener vote to find the nation's favourite song from a musical, as well as announcing schedule changes for January 2021.
- 19 December – Graham Norton presents his final Saturday morning show for Radio 2.
- 20 December – Magic announces it will air a pantomime on Christmas Day, starring Christopher Biggins and featuring a guest appearance by Rick Astley.
- 21 December – Ofcom finds Kiss in breach of the broadcasting code after a pre-recorded link introducing a Disney+ competition accidentally contained the F-word. The expletive, aired on 24 July, had been missed during pre-transmission editing.
- 22 December – BBC Radio Shropshire presenter Eric Smith presents his final breakfast show for the station after 26 years in the role, and retires after 49 years in the radio industry.
- 23 December –
  - The UK government announces £1.1m of emergency funding for the radio industry to help create content to tackle loneliness during the COVID crisis.
  - Dorset community station Forest FM adds an extra transmitter to expand its signal and better serve the area surrounding Ferndown.
  - Community station Heartland FM launches a crowdfunding appeal for £25,000 to cover running costs and keep it on air.
- 25 December –
  - BBC Radio 1 teams up with BFBS to broadcast four one hour shows between 10am and 2pm from military bases around the world where British soldiers are stationed, giving them a chance to send Christmas messages to their families.
  - The 39 stations in the BBC Local Radio network air seven hours of local content between 7am and 2pm as syndicated programming is increased this year. Two syndicated evening shows are also running between Christmas and New year, presented by Nana Akua at 6pm and Jim Davis at 10pm.
  - The cast of the BBC One TV series Gavin and Stacey are reunited for a Christmas Day special on BBC Radio Wales.
  - Radio Caroline broadcasts the Queen's Christmas Message for the first time, 56 years after its request to air the address was turned down by the BBC for being an unauthorised broadcaster.
- 27 December – Ally Bally presents his final programme for Radio Tay, having been with the station since its launch in October 1980.
- 30 December –
  - Staffordshire-based Moorlands Radio announces it is to stop paying its presenters because of the impact of the COVID-19 pandemic.
  - Wrexham community station Calon FM, based at Wrexham Glyndwr University, announces that it will close in the New Year after financial constraints on the university forced it to withdraw support for the station.
- 31 December –
  - Jane Garvey presents her final edition of Woman's Hour.
  - Rutland County Council confirms plans to move forward with investigations into the potential launch of a radio station for Rutland and Stamford after the project's Independent Project Board recommended the plan.
  - Love Sport Radio, a station founded by Kelvin McKenzie and which had been playing non-stop music since April because of the COVID-19 pandemic, ceases transmission at 10pm.

== Station debuts ==
- 21 January – Virgin Radio Groove
- 24 February – Absolute Radio 20s
- June – HG1 Radio
- 16 May – Lockdown FM
- 24 June – Ay Up Duck Radio
- 29 June – Times Radio
- 8 September – Lymm Radio
- 1 October – Capital Dance
- 9 October – BBC Radio 1 Dance
- November – Chesterfield Radio
- 2 November – Radio West Norfolk
- 1 December – Mom's Spaghetti
- 4 December – West Yorkshire Radio
- 7 December – BBC Radio Bradford
- 11 December – Union JACK Dance and Union JACK Rock
- 31 December – Get Radio

== Programme debuts ==
- 6 February – Newscast on BBC Radio 5 Live (2020–present)
- 19 March – Sounds of the 90s on BBC Radio 2 (2020–present)
- 5 May – The Isolation Tapes with Elis James and John Robins on BBC Radio 5 Live (2020–2021)

== Podcast debuts ==
- 20 April – Frank Skinner's Poetry Podcast (podcast) released by Absolute Radio (2020–present)

== Continuing radio programmes ==
=== 1940s ===
- Desert Island Discs (1942 – present)
- Woman's Hour (1946 – present)
- A Book at Bedtime (1949 – present)

=== 1950s ===
- The Archers (1950 – present)
- The Today Programme (1957 – present)

=== 1960s ===
- Farming Today (1960 – present)
- In Touch (1961 – present)
- The World at One (1965 – present)
- The Official Chart (1967 – present)
- Just a Minute (1967 – present)
- The Living World (1968 – present)

=== 1970s ===
- PM (1970 – present)
- Start the Week (1970 – present)
- You and Yours (1970 – present)
- I'm Sorry I Haven't a Clue (1972 – present)
- Good Morning Scotland (1973 – present)
- Newsbeat (1973 – present)
- File on 4 (1977 – present)
- Money Box (1977 – present)
- The News Quiz (1977 – present)
- Feedback (1979 – present)
- The Food Programme (1979 – present)
- Science in Action (1979 – present)

=== 1980s ===
- Steve Wright in the Afternoon (1981–1993, 1999–2022)
- In Business (1983 – present)
- Sounds of the 60s (1983 – present)
- Loose Ends (1986 – present)

=== 1990s ===
- The Moral Maze (1990 – present)
- Essential Selection (1991 – present)
- Night Waves (1992 – present)
- Essential Mix (1993 – present)
- Up All Night (1994 – present)
- Wake Up to Money (1994 – present)
- Private Passions (1995 – present)
- In Our Time (1998 – present)
- Material World (1998 – present)
- Scott Mills (1998–2022)
- The Now Show (1998 – present)

=== 2000s ===
- BBC Radio 2 Folk Awards (2000 – present)
- Big John @ Breakfast (2000 – present)
- Sounds of the 70s (2000–2008, 2009 – present)
- Dead Ringers (2000–2007, 2014 – present)
- Kermode and Mayo's Film Review (2001–2022)
- A Kist o Wurds (2002 – present)
- Fighting Talk (2003 – present)
- Jeremy Vine (2003 – present)
- The Chris Moyles Show (2004–2012, 2015 – present)
- Annie Mac (2004–2021)
- Elaine Paige on Sunday (2004 – present)
- The Bottom Line (2006 – present)
- The Christian O'Connell Breakfast Show (2006 – present)
- The Unbelievable Truth (2006 – present)
- Radcliffe & Maconie (2007 – present)
- The Media Show (2008 – present)
- Newsjack (2009 – present)
- Paul O'Grady on the Wireless (2009–2022)
- Alan and Mel's Summer Escape (2009–2020)

=== 2010s ===
- The Third Degree (2011 – present)
- BBC Radio 1's Dance Anthems (2012 – present)
- Sounds of the 80s (2013 – present)
- Question Time Extra Time (2013 – present)
- The Show What You Wrote (2013 – present)
- Friday Sports Panel (2014 – present)
- Stumped (2015 – present)
- Brexitcast (2017–2020)
- Radio 1's Party Anthems (2019–present)
- You, Me and the Big C (2018–present)

== Ending this year ==
- 1 February – Brexitcast (2017–2020)
- March – Up All Night (1994–2020)
- 10 June – The Nigel Farage Show (2017–2020)
- September – Alan and Mel's Summer Escape (2009–2020)
- 29 October – Late Night Graham Torrington (2012–2020)
- 19 December – Graham Norton (2010–2020)

== Closing this year ==
Date	Station	Debuted
12 March	Heart Extra	2016
12 March	Smooth Extra	2014
31 May	Radio City Talk	2008
31 August	Compass FM	2001
1 September	Radio Aire	1981
1 December	The VIP Lounge	2015
31 December	Love Sport Radio	2019

== Deaths ==
- 7 January – Stephen Clements, 47, radio presenter (BBC Radio Ulster)
- 18 January – Peter Hobday, 82, broadcast news presenter (BBC Radio 4)
- 28 January – Nicholas Parsons, 96, actor, radio and television presenter (Just a Minute)
- 12 March – Pete Mitchell, 61, disc jockey (BBC Radio 2, BBC 6 Music)
- 15 March – Roy Hudd, 83, actor and comedian (The News Huddlines)
- 12 April – Tim Brooke-Taylor, 79, broadcast comedy performer (I'm Sorry I Haven't a Clue)
- 30 April – Wally K. Daly, 79, radio scriptwriter (What's Stigmata?)
- 18 June – Dame Vera Lynn, 103, singer (Sincerely Yours)
- 10 July – Steve Sutherland, 58, disc jockey (Choice FM, Galaxy FM)
- 26 July – Chris Needs, 68, disc jockey (BBC Radio Cymru)
- 21 August – Marilyn Imrie, 72, Scottish theatre and radio drama director and producer
- 22 August – Richard Cartridge, 72, radio host (BBC Radio Solent, Classic FM)
- 28 October – Johnny Owen, 66, presenter (Signal Radio, HitMix)
- 31 October – Julie Donaldson, 50, radio presenter (Wear FM, BBC Tees, Zetland FM)
- 2 November – Peter Goodwright, 84, comedic impressionist
- 16 November – Eric Hall, 73, showbusiness and football radio presenter (BBC Radio Essex, Time 107.5)
- 7 December – Rishi Modi, 35, radio presenter (Sabras Radio)
- 17 December – Umberto Saoncella, radio presenter (Piccadilly Radio, Real Radio, Century Radio)
- 24 December – Michelle Mullane, 50, radio presenter (Key 103, BBC Radio Manchester)
- 29 December – Lara Mcnamee, 45, presenter (Radio Woking)
