= Yardie =

Slang term for a Jamaican street gang

Yardie organized crime groups/Jamaican posse
- Years active: 1970s- present
- Territory: Jamaica, United Kingdom, Canada, United States
- Ethnicity: Jamaicans
- Activities: drug trafficking, arms trafficking, kidnapping, murder
- Rivals: Zoe Pound, Black Mafia

"Yardie" (also "Yaadi" or "Yawdie") is a term generally used among Caribbean expatriates and the Jamaican diaspora to refer to people of Jamaican origin, although the exact meaning depends on context. The term is derived from the Jamaican Patois for “home” or "yard". The term may have specifically originated from the crowded "government yards" of two-storey government-funded concrete homes found in Kingston and inhabited by poorer Jamaican residents, though "yard" can also refer to "home" or "turf" in general in Jamaican Patois.

Outside of Jamaica, "yardies" is often used to refer to Jamaican gangs or organized crime groups and gangsters of Jamaican origin, nationality, or ethnicity. In this sense, the term is sometimes used interchangeably with the term "posse" or "Jamaican posse" to refer to crime groups of Jamaican origin, with the term "posse" used more frequently in North America and "Yardies" being used more frequently in the United Kingdom. Yardie gangs or Jamaican "posses" are involved in a wide array of criminal activity depending on their location, ranging from political corruption, political violence, and assassination in Jamaica to drug trafficking and gang violence in the US, Canada, and UK.

== Etymology and usage ==
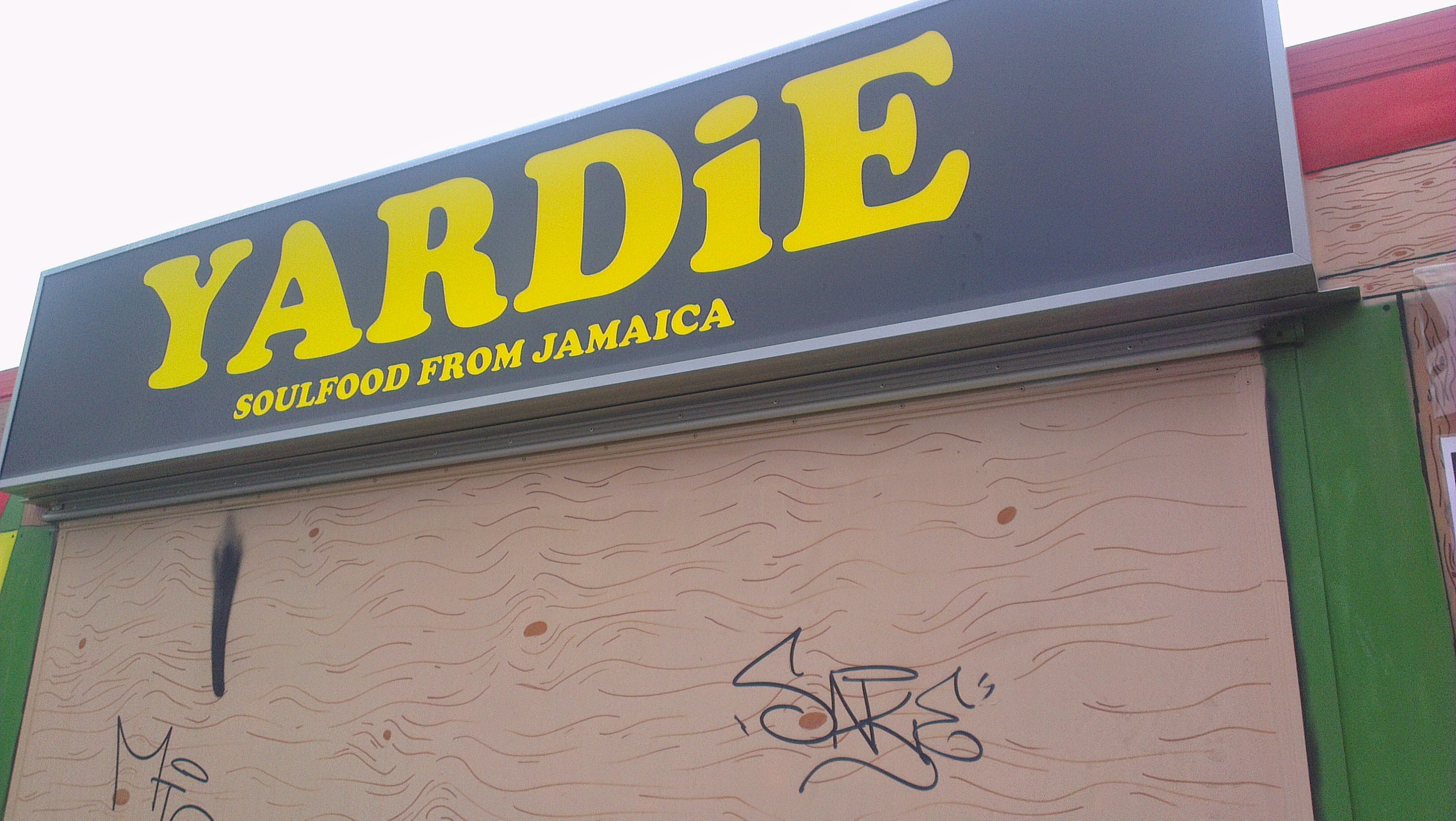
Foodtruck selling Jamaican food named "Yardie", Stockholm

Derived from Jamaican Patois, the term "yardie" can be ambiguous, having multiple meanings depending on context. In the most innocuous sense, "yardie" can simply refer to a Jamaican national; as "yard" can mean "home" in Jamaican Patois, Jamaican expatriates who moved abroad to countries such as the U.K. and U.S. would often refer to themselves and other Jamaicans as "yardies". "Yardie" may also more specifically apply to those Jamaicans originating in the impoverished "government yards" or courtyards of Jamaican public housing, and the term was eventually applied to criminals and gang members originating from these "yards." As the term "yard" in Jamaican Patois can also refer to a territory, turf, or piece of land, "yardie" further gained gang or criminal connotations as Jamaican gangs or criminals claimed certain "territories" or "turf" and referred to such territory as their "yards." Subsequently, in the U.K. and, to a lesser extent, North America, the term "Yardie" most frequently refers to gangsters or gangs of Jamaican origin, though these gang members themselves may refer to their gangs as "posses" or "crews." The term is especially common in the U.K. to describe Jamaican or British Jamaican organized crime groups and gangs, while "posse" has become the more common term in North America.

== Origins of "Yardie" organized crime groups ==
In the 1950s in Trenchtown, Kingston, Jamaica, the government created social housing developments employing large public courtyards, and the courtyard areas soon became the hub of social and recreational activity in the crowded housing of Trenchtown. With increasing overcrowding and poverty, however, squatting and homelessness developed within the yards. Crime, drug abuse, and violence overran the yards, while political corruption and clientelism led to local politicians buying and selling patronage within the community and paying gangs and violent political supporters to intimidate voters and threaten, assault, or kill political opponents.

By the 1970s and 1980s, political violence and politically-affiliated organized crime groups and street gangs became increasingly common in poorer areas of Jamaica, with gangs often led by older bosses known as "dons" (in reference to the Sicilian Mafia don) and participating in apolitical drug trafficking and racketeering in addition to political violence and political intimidation. These gangs became known as "Yardies," "posses", or "crews". Accounts of the association between Jamaican political factions and the rise of the Yardies are given in the factual books Ruthless by Geoff Small and Born Fi' Dead by Laurie Gunst.

By the 1980s, a drop in government budgets resulted in less money being paid by political parties to their gangs of armed supporters. These political Yardie gangs thus increasingly turned to apolitical criminal activity, such as drug trafficking, to bring in income. At the same time, the Jamaican government severely cracked down on Yardie gangs and political violence in general, leading many so-called Yardie gangsters to immigrate abroad and establish gangs in the U.K., U.S., and Canada. The establishment of Yardie gangs abroad coincided with the rise of crack cocaine in both North America and the U.K., and Yardie and Posse gangs from Jamaica became heavily involved in the trafficking of crack cocaine and other drugs, in addition to illegal gambling and other criminal activity.

== United Kingdom ==
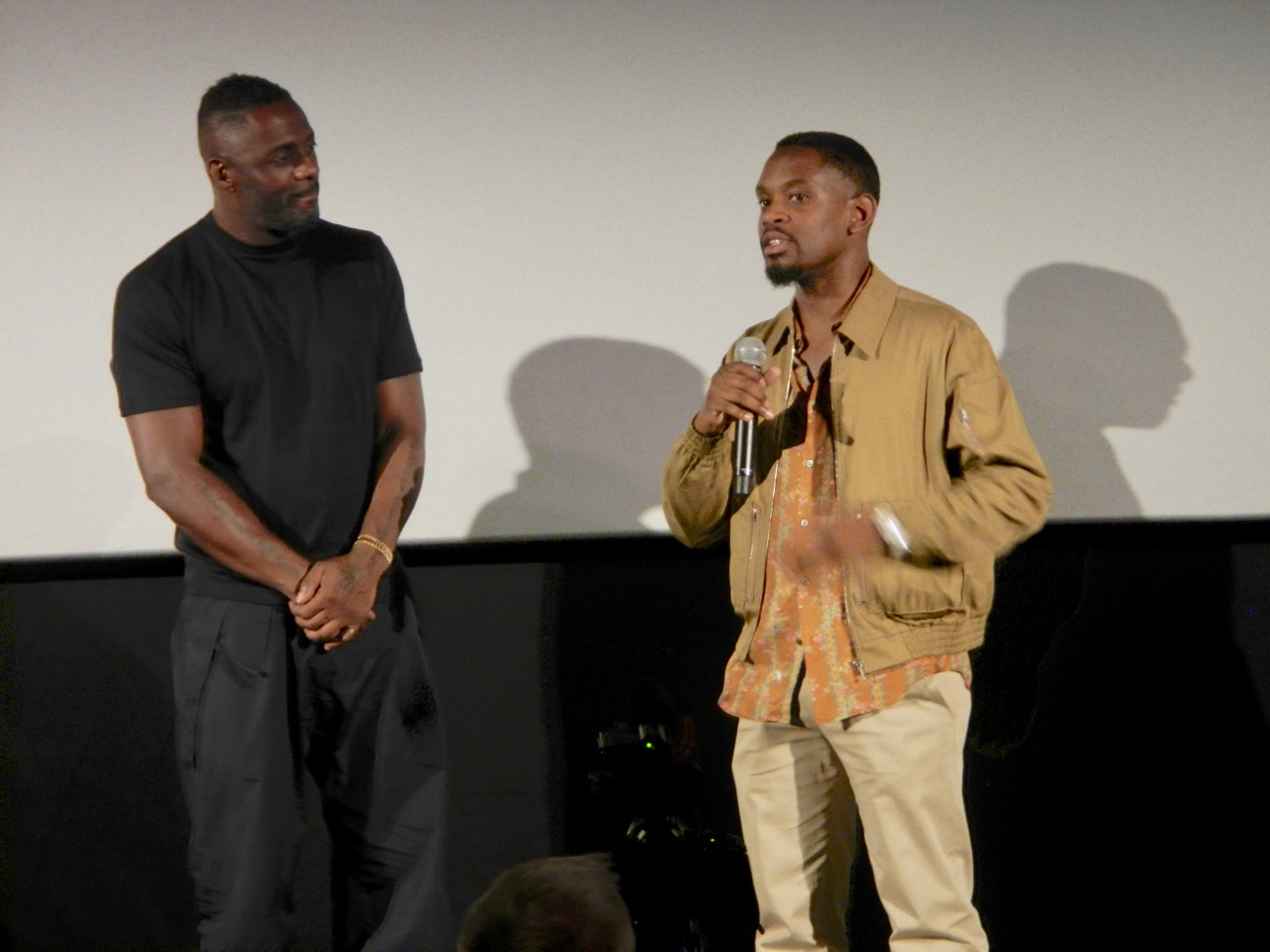
Yardie director Idris Elba (left) with actor Aml Ameen (right)

In 1948, the Labour government introduced the "British Nationality Act 1948", which came into effect in January 1949. This act introduced the status of "Citizen of the United Kingdom and Colonies" (CUKC), essentially putting all residents within Britain's colonies on an equal footing with existing residents of the British Isles and gave every person within the British commonwealth the right to move to the UK, if they so wished. Within the Caribbean community, new arrivals from Jamaica were sometimes referred to as "Yardies" due to reference of Jamaica as "back a yard" (or "back home"). A large influx of inner city Jamaican immigration to Britain during the 1980s led to the rise of gang violence or behaviour on the part of Jamaicans which became known in wider British society as "Yardie culture" and the participants "Yardies". The terms "Yardie gang" or "Yardie gun violence" were largely used by the British media to describe violent crimes in London's black community. The gangs in London are specifically known to have occupied and operated in Brixton, Harlesden/Stonebridge, Hackney, Tottenham, Peckham and Notting Hill.

Yardie activity has been reported in Aberdeen and South Wales (see county lines drug trafficking).

Jamaican-born British writer Victor Headley wrote a bestselling 1992 novel entitled Yardie. In 2018, British actor Idris Elba made his directorial debut with his feature film Yardie, based on Headley's book.

== Criminal activity ==
Yardie gangs are notorious for their involvement in gun crime and the illegal drug trade, notably marijuana and crack cocaine in the United Kingdom. In 1993, Yardies were blamed for the murder of Police Constable Patrick Dunne, shot dead while patrolling in Clapham. In 2006, Rohan Chung, described as a Jamaican yard gangster was given three life sentences for the murders of Noel Patterson and his daughters, Connie and Lorna Morrison.

British police are hesitant to categorize British Yardie gangs as organized crime, since there appears to be no real structure or central leadership; affiliations between the various Yardie gangs in the UK can be described as loose at best. Academics have noted a tendency to over-label black British crime as "Yardie"-related due to stereotype and social narrative.

A number of operations to combat Yardie gun crime have been set up, notably Operation Trident in the London area. Yardies (or imitating) gangs also appear to be active in Bristol, Birmingham, Aberdeen, Edinburgh and Nottingham but to a lesser extent.

Some maintain that the supposed reach and influence in communities of these "Yardies" is a myth.

== In popular culture ==
=== Films and television series ===
- The Harder They Come (1972)
- Live and Let Die (1973)
- Marked for Death (1990)
- Predator 2 (1990)
- Rumble in the Bronx (1995)
- Belly (1998)
- Caught Up (film), (1998)
- Snatch (2000)
- Shottas (2002)
- Triads, Yardies and Onion Bhajees (2003)
- Rollin' with the Nines (2006)
- Running Scared (2006)
- Ross Kemp on Gangs (2007)
- The Other Guys (2010)
- Out the Gate (2011)
- Castle (2012)
- Luke Cage (2018)
- Yardie (2018)
- Top Boy (2019)
- Respect the Jux (2022)
- Bob Marley: One Love (2024)

=== Video games ===
- Grand Theft Auto (1997)
- Grand Theft Auto III (2001)
- The Getaway (2002)
- The Getaway: Black Monday (2004)
- Grand Theft Auto Advance (2004)
- Grand Theft Auto: Liberty City Stories (2005)
- Gangs of London (2006)
- Grand Theft Auto IV (2008)
- Grand Theft Auto: Chinatown Wars (2009)

=== Books ===
- Yardie - Victor Headley (1992)

== See also ==
- Jamaican posse
- Rude boy
- Badman (slang)
