= Skank =

Skank may refer to:

- A vulgar slang term for a promiscuous woman

== Music ==
- Skank (band), a Brazilian rock/pop/reggae/ska band
  - Skank (album), the band's self-titled debut album
- Skank (guitar), a guitar technique used in reggae, ska, and rocksteady
- Skank beat, a drum beat common in punk and heavy metal music

== Other art, entertainment, and media ==
- Skank (dance), a form of dance related to ska, grime and hardcore punk
- Skank (magazine), a British satirical magazine published 1994-97

== See also ==
- "The Rockafeller Skank", a song by Fatboy Slim
- Ska, a music genre that originated in Jamaica
- Slut (disambiguation)
