= Heather O'Reilly =

American soccer player and sports analyst (born 1985)

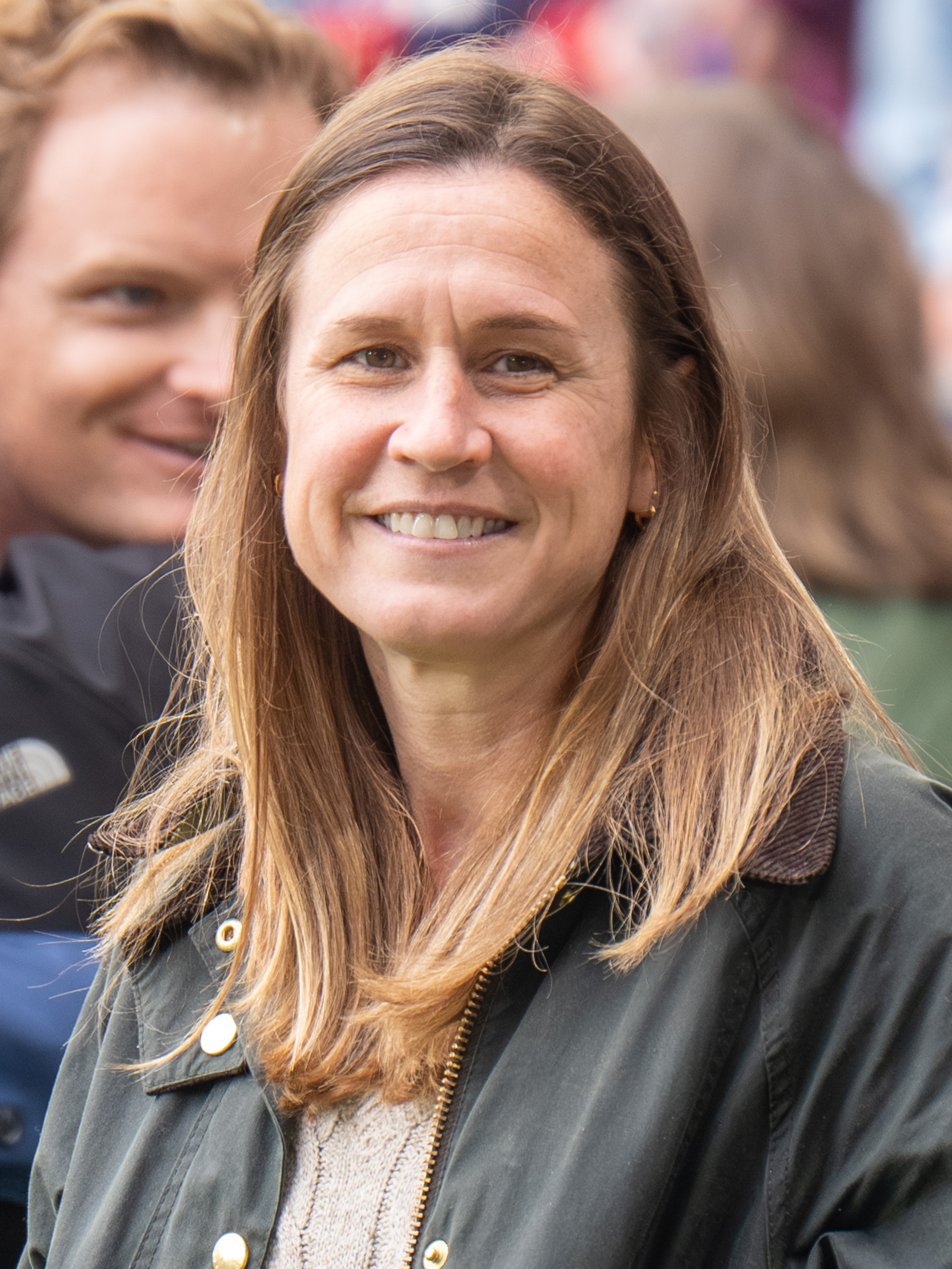
- Heather O'Reilly in 2026

Personal information
- Full name: Heather Ann O'Reilly
- Date of birth: January 2, 1985 (age 41)
- Place of birth: East Brunswick, New Jersey, United States
- Height: 5 ft 5 in (1.65 m)
- Positions: Midfielder; winger

College career
Years	Team	Apps	(Gls)
2003–2006	North Carolina Tar Heels		

Senior career*
Years	Team	Apps	(Gls)
2004–2005	New Jersey Wildcats	9	(8)
2009–2011	Sky Blue FC	50	(4)
2012–2014	Boston Breakers	44	(14)
2015–2016	FC Kansas City	27	(3)
2017–2018	Arsenal	24	(3)
2018–2019	North Carolina Courage	21	(1)
2022	Shelbourne	4	(0)

International career
- United States U-19
- United States U-21
2002–2016	United States	231	(47)
Medal record
Olympic Games
Gold medal – first place	2004 Athens	Team
Gold medal – first place	2008 Beijing	Team
Gold medal – first place	2012 London	Team
FIFA Women's World Cup
Gold medal – first place	2015 Canada	Team
Silver medal – second place	2011 Germany	Team
Bronze medal – third place	2007 China	Team
- * Club domestic league appearances and goals

Heather Ann O'Reilly (born January 2, 1985) is an American former professional women's soccer player who played as a midfielder. She played for the United States women's national soccer team (USWNT), with whom she won three Olympic gold medals and a FIFA Women's World Cup. From 2003 to 2006, she played college soccer for the University of North Carolina at Chapel Hill (UNC-CH). During her club career, O'Reilly played for the New Jersey Wildcats (USL W-League), Sky Blue FC (WPS), Boston Breakers (WPSL Elite and NWSL), FC Kansas City (NWSL), Arsenal (FA WSL), North Carolina Courage (NWSL), and Shelbourne (WNL).

Upon her initial retirement from international play in September 2016, she is one of the world's most capped soccer players with over 230 international appearances to her name. She is a skilled flank player, currently tied for fifth with Julie Foudy in USWNT history for assists. She is also the eighth most capped player in USWNT history. On October 27, 2019, she played her final match for the North Carolina Courage before retiring, winning the 2019 NWSL championship.

She is currently an analyst for Fox Sports. O'Reilly announced on July 28, 2022, that she would be coming out of retirement to play for Women's National League side Shelbourne and take part in their upcoming UEFA Women's Champions League campaign. She scored a match-winning goal against ZNK Pomurje on her debut.

== Early life ==
Born to Andrew and Carol O'Reilly, Heather O'Reilly is the youngest of four children. Growing up in East Brunswick, New Jersey, O'Reilly attended Saint Bartholomew's School and later played on the girls soccer team at East Brunswick High School. In her four-year career, she scored 143 goals. As a junior in 2001, she led the team to the New Jersey state high school title.

Throughout high school, O'Reilly was a member of the National Honor Society and played on the school's basketball team. During her senior year, she was named All-American and National Player of the Year by Parade Magazine. In 2002, she was named the Gatorade High School National Player of the Year and the National Soccer Coaches Association Player of the Year. She was also named by Soccer America as the top college recruit in the country.

=== North Carolina Tar Heels, 2003–06 ===
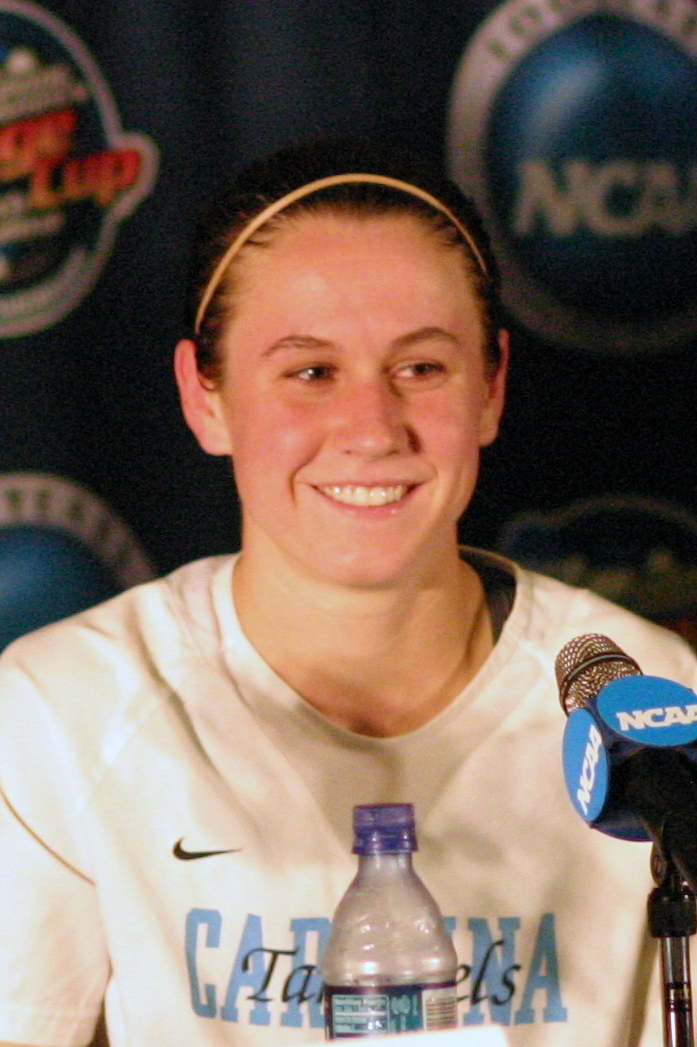
O'Reilly as a Tar Heel player

O'Reilly was an education major at the University of North Carolina, where she played forward for the North Carolina Tar Heels women's soccer program from 2003 through 2006. She appeared 97 times for the Tar Heels, scoring 59 goals and assisting on 49 others. She led her team to the national Championships in 2003 and 2006.

During her senior year, ESPN the Magazine named her the All-American Player of the Year and was awarded the NCAA's Today's Top VIII Award following her senior year. As a senior, she won the Honda Sports Award as the nation's top soccer player.

In 2008, O'Reilly's No. 20 jersey was retired by the program, joining athletes April Heinrichs, Lorrie Fair, Tisha Venturini, Kristine Lilly and Mia Hamm, along with 13 others.

== Club career ==
=== New Jersey Wildcats, 2004–2005 ===
O'Reilly played for New Jersey Wildcats of W-League from 2004 to 2005, winning the Championship in 2005.

=== Sky Blue FC, 2009–2011 ===
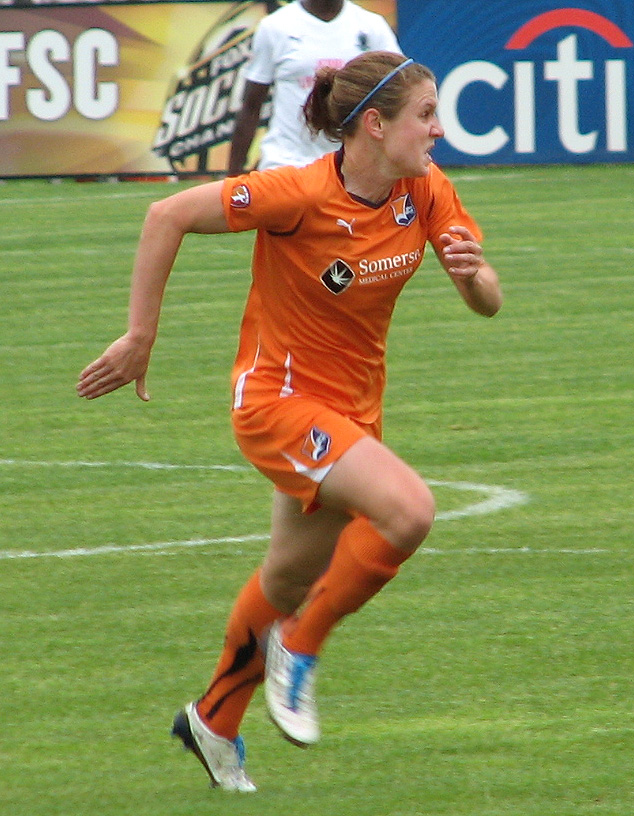
O'Reilly playing for Sky Blue FC, 2010

O'Reilly was allocated to Sky Blue FC of Women's Professional Soccer on September 16, 2008, along with fellow U.S. national team players Natasha Kai and Christie Rampone. She appeared in 17 matches as co-captain during the 2009 inaugural season, leading Sky Blue to an unexpected playoff berth. During the Championship 2009 Women's Professional Soccer Playoffs match against Los Angeles, she scored the only goal helping her team clinch the Championship title.

=== Boston Breakers, 2012–2014 ===
Following her husband's enrollment in Harvard Business School, O'Reilly trained with and played two matches with the Boston Breakers of the Women's Premier Soccer League Elite in 2012 after the WPS folded and during breaks with her national team duties. She was allocated to the Breakers in 2013 at the initiation of the new National Women's Soccer League.

=== FC Kansas City, 2015–2016 ===
On October 27, 2014, FC Kansas City announced that it had acquired O'Reilly in a trade that sent Morgan Marlborough and Kassey Kallman to the Breakers.

=== Arsenal, 2017–2018 ===
On January 18, 2017, Arsenal announced they had signed O'Reilly. The club is a member of the top division of the Football Association Women's Super League, the highest level of women's professional soccer in England. After 38 appearances in all competitions and four goals, it was confirmed by Arsenal that she would leave the club in the summer of 2018.

=== North Carolina Courage, 2018–2019 ===
After FC Kansas City ceased operations, the Utah Royals FC maintained O'Reilly's NWSL rights. On June 28, 2018, the Courage traded Makenzy Doniak and a 2019 3rd round pick for O'Reilly and a 2019 2nd round pick. O'Reilly appeared in 8 regular season games and both playoff games for the Courage. North Carolina won the NWSL Shield & NWSL Championship.

North Carolina participated in the 2018 Women's International Champions Cup, O'Reilly started in the Championship Game and scored a goal in the 10th minute. The Courage defeated Olympique Lyonnais 1–0 to win the inaugural edition of the tournament.

On April 12, 2019, O'Reilly announced via social media that she would retire from professional soccer at the conclusion of the 2019 NWSL Season.

=== Shelbourne, 2022 ===
On July 28, 2022, O'Reilly announced that she would be coming out of retirement to play for Irish champions Shelbourne, fulfilling her dream of playing in the UEFA Women's Champions League (UWCL). During her participation at Soccer Aid 2022, Arsène Wenger had suggested O'Reilly continue her playing career, which prompted her to look for a suitable UWCL club. She found Shelbourne's offer attractive because she is an Irish American.

O'Reilly made her Shelbourne debut on July 30, 2022, against Sligo Rovers.

On August 18, 2022, O'Reilly started for Shelbourne in their UEFA Women's Champions League qualifier against Slovenian side Pomurje. O'Reilly scored the only goal of the game, a header in the fourth minute. Following Shelbourne's elimination from the UEFA Women's Champions League, O'Reilly took temporary leave of the team, stating that she would be "joining back with the team later [in the] season."

O'Reilly joined back up with Shelbourne in October 2022, returning to action in the side's 2-0 victory against Sligo Rovers. O'Reilly enjoyed playing for Shelbourne and was pleased to contribute to their 2022 Women's National League title win: "I didn't think that the team would mean so much to me, and that I would really want to come back and help them win the league. I kept an eye on things when I went back home and, when the title race was heating up, I wanted to come back and help in any way that I could." She also made a substitute appearance in the 2022 FAI Women's Cup Final, as Shelbourne beat Athlone Town 2–0 to secure a League and Cup Double.

=== Other post-retirement ===
O'Reilly returned to the North Carolina Courage organization in 2023 to serve as a player-coach for its amateur USL W League side, joking that the team would have to change its name from "North Carolina Courage U23" to "North Carolina Courage U39". O'Reilly was rostered for the NC Courage U23 again in 2024, coming into play as a substitute during the team's 3–0 playoff win over the Long Island Rough Riders.

O'Reilly signed a one-day contract with NJ/NY Gotham FC for a friendly game against Chelsea on August 19, 2024, but did not make the matchday roster after not passing her physical.

== International career (2002–2016) ==
In 2002, while still in high school, O'Reilly was named to the U.S. national team. O'Reilly made her first appearance with the United States women's national soccer team on March 1, 2002, against Sweden.

=== 2002 FIFA U-19 Women's World Cup ===
O'Reilly was a key member of USA's U-19 World Cup winning team in 2002, scoring four goals and creating seven. This helped the USA youth to win the first World Championship ever for this level.

=== 2004 Athens Olympics ===
After recovering from a broken fibula from a match the year before, O'Reilly made the national team roster for the 2004 Summer Olympics in Athens. At nineteen years old, she was the youngest player on the roster. On August 23, 2004, she scored the match winning goal in the Olympic semi-final match against Germany, propelling the United States into the final, in which they defeated Brazil for the gold medal.

=== 2007 FIFA Women's World Cup ===
In the 2007 FIFA Women's World Cup, O'Reilly scored a critical goal against North Korea in the 69th minute, which tied the match at 2–2 and saved the Americans from a devastating opening-round loss. The United States ended up taking the bronze medal, with O'Reilly scoring a goal during the 4–1 win against Norway. She was nominated as Sports Illustrated's 2007 Sportsman of the Year.

=== 2008 Beijing Olympics ===
O'Reilly competed at the Beijing 2008 Summer Olympic games. She scored the quickest goal in Olympic women's soccer history against New Zealand to advance to the quarterfinals. She also scored a goal in the semi-final match against Japan. The team went on to defeat heavy-favorites Brazil 1–0 to win the gold medal. Prior to the Summer Games, Time magazine ranked her number 15 on its list of 100 Olympic Athletes to Watch.

=== 2011 FIFA Women's World Cup ===
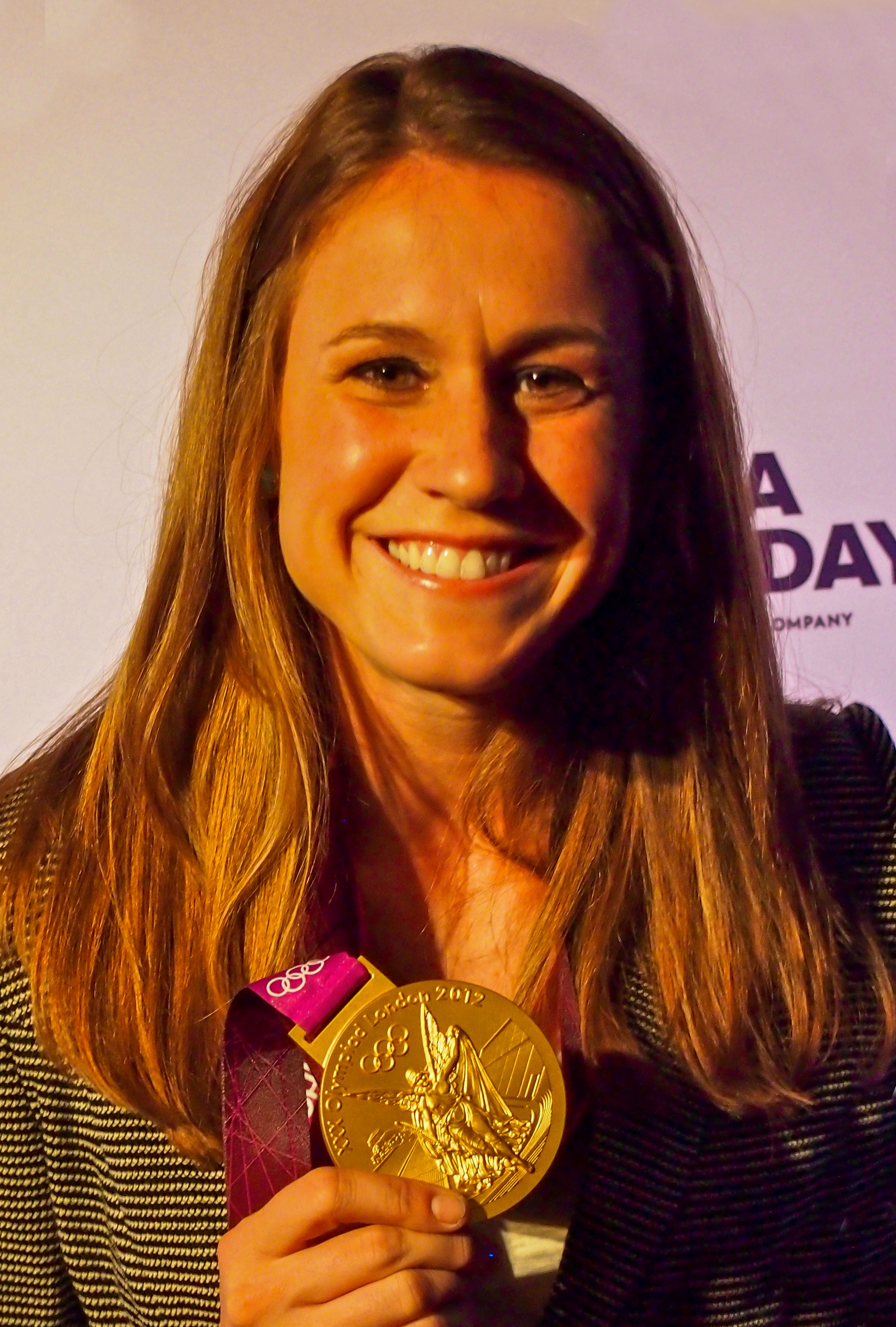
O'Reilly in 2012

O'Reilly was selected for the 2011 FIFA Women's World Cup and in the second match of the group stage scored the first of three goals for USA against Colombia. The goal was later nominated for the FIFA Puskás Award in 2011.

=== 2012 London Olympics ===
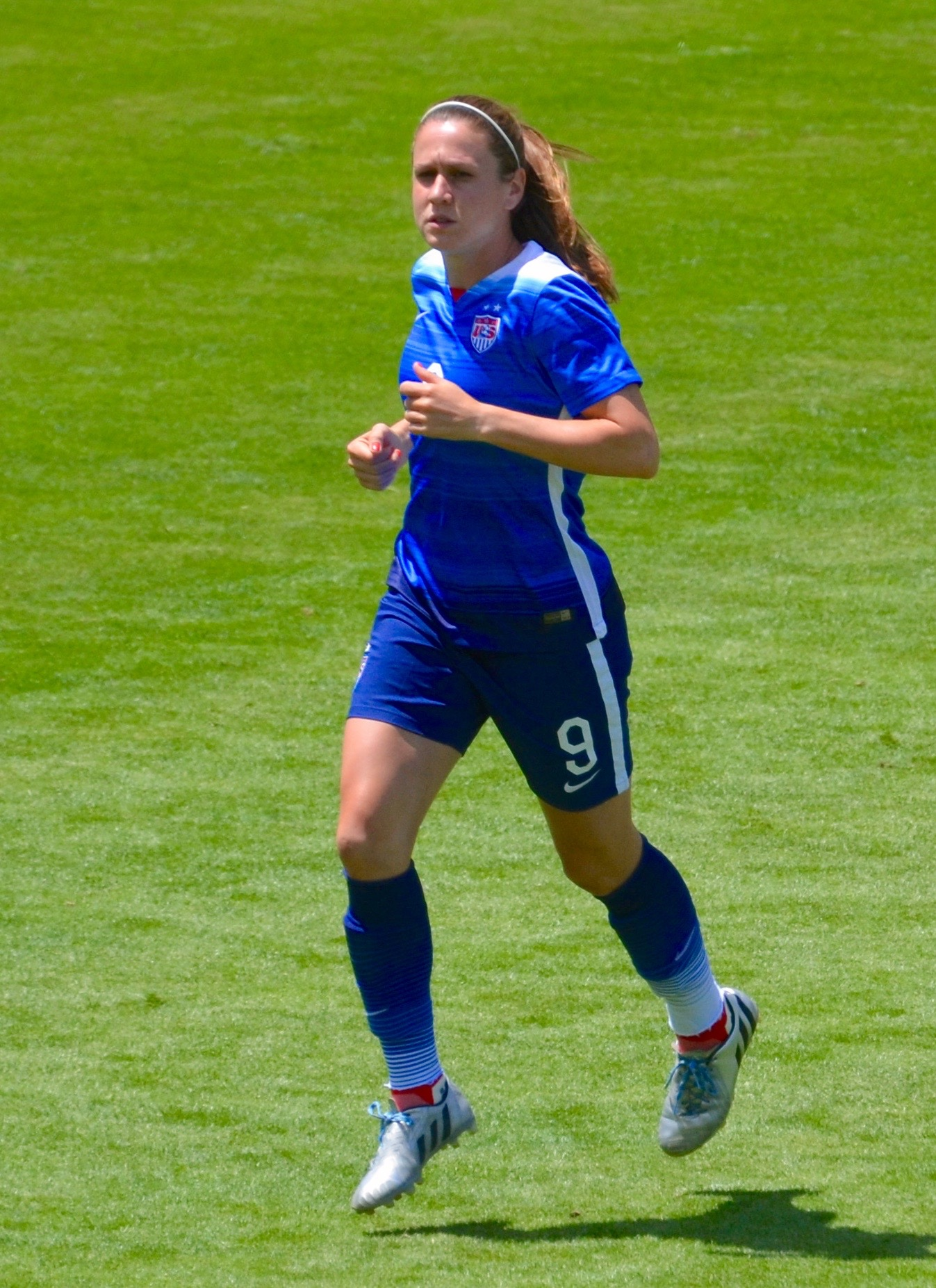
Playing for the U.S. national team in San Jose, Calif., 2015

At the 2012 Olympics in London, she made a crucial assist in the 123rd minute of the semi-final match against Canada, sending a cross from the right to Alex Morgan who headed the ball into the goal over the hand of Erin McLeod, propelling team USA to the gold medal match against Japan.

=== 2015 FIFA Women's World Cup ===
O'Reilly was selected for her third World Cup in 2015. She appeared in the quarter final game against China as a substitute to help the U.S. win 1-0. O’Reilly became a World Cup Champion on July 5, when the United States defeated Japan 5–2 in the Women's World Cup final. O'Reilly joined the national team on a Victory Tour following their World Cup win.

=== 2016 Rio Olympics ===
To some controversy, she was left off the team by Jill Ellis and made an alternate for the 2016 Rio Olympics even with having the most caps of the squad at the time (229). The U.S. national team went on to achieve its worst Olympic finish, being knocked out by Sweden in the quarter-finals.

=== Retirement, 2016 ===
On September 1, 2016, O'Reilly announced her retirement from the Women's National Team after 15 years. She retired on September 15 after a friendly match against Thailand, held in Columbus, Ohio, after the USWNT scored 9 goals.

== In popular culture ==
=== Magazines ===
In 2008, Time listed profiled O'Reilly as the No. 15 Olympic Athlete to Watch in their list of 100 Olympic Athletes To Watch. She has been featured in Fitness, Shape, Teen Vogue, Sports Illustrated, and Boston Magazine.

=== Video games ===
O'Reilly was featured along with her national teammates in the EA Sports' FIFA video game series in FIFA 16, the first time women players were included in the game.

=== Ticker tape parade and White House honors ===
Following the United States' win at the 2015 FIFA Women's World Cup, O'Reilly and her teammates became the first women's sports team to be honored with a ticker tape parade in New York City. Each player received a key to the city from Mayor Bill de Blasio. In October of the same year, the team was honored by President Barack Obama at the White House.

=== Television and film ===
O'Reilly has made appearances with her national teammates on Late Night with David Letterman, The Today Show, The Rachel Maddow Show and Good Morning America. She was featured in the film, Winning Isn't Everything about the women's soccer program at the University of North Carolina.

=== Radio and other media ===
O'Reilly began cohosting the BBC World Service's BBC World Football program with Mani Djazmi, Pat Nevin, and Peter Odemwingie when the program changed formats in 2018. She is also now the co-host of “Played In” on SiriusXM FC with Lori Lindsey.

== Personal life ==
O'Reilly married former UNC lacrosse player Dave Werry, whom she met when the two attended UNC, in 2011 Their son William was born on June 18, 2020. O'Reilly gave birth to their second child, Jack, on November 26, 2021.

She is nicknamed "HAO," the initials of her name (Heather Ann O'Reilly) and pronounced 'hey-oh'.

O'Reilly has endorsement deals with Adidas. In 2013, she appeared in a commercial for Adidas' Adizero™ running shoe.

== Career statistics ==
=== International goals ===
Scores and results list the United States' goal tally first, score column indicates score after each O'Reilly goal.

List of international goals scored by Heather O'Reilly
No.	Date	Venue	Opponent	Score	Result	Competition	Ref.
1	October 6, 2002	Cary	Italy	2–0	4–0	Nike U.S. Cup	
2	January 23, 2003	Yiwu	Norway	3–1	3–1	Four Nations Tournament	
3	June 15, 2003	Salt Lake	Republic of Ireland	1–0	5–0	Friendly	
4	August 23, 2004	Heraklio	Germany	2–1	2–1	Olympics: semifinal	
5	July 10, 2005	Portland	Ukraine	7–0	7–0	Friendly	
6	March 11, 2006	Quarteira	Denmark	2–0	5–0	Algarve Cup: Group B	
7	March 11, 2006	Quarteira	Denmark	3–0	5–0	Algarve Cup: Group B	
8	July 23, 2006	San Diego	Republic of Ireland	1–0	5–0	Friendly	
9	January 28, 2007	Guangzhou	England	1–0	1–1	Four Nations Tournament	
10	May 12, 2007	Frisco	Canada	6–2	6–2	Friendly	
11	August 25, 2007	Carson	Finland	4–0	4–0	Friendly	
12	September 11, 2007	Chengdu	North Korea	2–2	2–2	World Cup: Group B	
13	September 30, 2007	Shanghai	Norway	4–1	4–1	World Cup: third place match	
14	October 13, 2007	St. Louis	Mexico	1–1	5–1	Friendly	
15	October 20, 2007	Albuquerque	Mexico	1–1	1–1	Friendly	
16	March 7, 2008	Alvor	Italy	2–0	2–0	Algarve Cup: Group B	
17	March 10, 2008	Alvor	Norway	3–0	4–0	Algarve Cup: Group B	
18	April 4, 2008	Juarez	Jamaica	5–0	6–0	Olympic qualifier: Group A	
19	April 9, 2008	Juarez	Costa Rica	2–0	3–0	Olympic qualifier: semifinal	
20	August 12, 2008	Shenyang	New Zealand	1–0	4–0	Olympics: Group G	
21	August 18, 2008	Beijing	Japan	3–1	4–2	Olympics: semifinal	
22	September 13, 2008	Philadelphia	Republic of Ireland	2–0	2–0	Friendly	
23	November 1, 2008	Richmond	South Korea	2–0	3–0	Friendly	
24	November 8, 2008	Tampa	South Korea	1–0	1–0	Friendly	
25	December 17, 2008	Detroit	China	1–0	1–0	Friendly	
26	May 22, 2010	Cleveland	Germany	2–0	4–0	Friendly	
27	October 2, 2010	Kennesaw	China	2–1	2–1	Friendly	
28	March 9, 2011	Faro	Iceland	3–2	4–2	Algarve Cup: final	
29	May 18, 2011	Cary	Japan	2–0	2–0	Friendly	
30	July 2, 2011	Sinsheim	Colombia	1–0	3–0	World Cup: Group C	
31	January 20, 2012	Vancouver	Dominican Republic	4–0	14–0	Olympic qualifier: Group B	
32	January 20, 2012	Vancouver	Dominican Republic	7–0	14–0	Olympic qualifier: Group B	
33	January 20, 2012	Vancouver	Dominican Republic	14–0	14–0	Olympic qualifier: Group B	
34	January 24, 2012	Vancouver	Mexico	1–0	4–0	Olympic qualifier: Group B	
35	September 1, 2012	Rochester	Costa Rica	8–0	8–0	Friendly	
36	September 19, 2012	Commerce	Australia	1–0	6–2	Friendly	
37	October 27, 2013	San Francisco	New Zealand	4–1	4–1	Friendly	
38	February 8, 2013	Boca Raton	Russia	2–0	7–0	Friendly	
39	February 13, 2013	Atlanta	Russia	7–0	8–0	Friendly	
40	March 12, 2014	Parchal	North Korea	3–0	3–0	Algarve: seventh place match	
41	September 13, 2014	Sandy	Mexico	8–0	8–0	Friendly	
42	August 16, 2015	Pittsburgh	Costa Rica	1–0	8–0	Friendly	
43	August 16, 2015	Pittsburgh	Costa Rica	6–0	8–0	Friendly	
44	August 19, 2015	Chattanooga	Costa Rica	2–0	7–2	Friendly	
45	August 19, 2015	Chattanooga	Costa Rica	5–0	7–2	Friendly	
46	September 20, 2015	Birmingham	Haiti	8–0	8–0	Friendly	
47	September 15, 2016	Columbus	Thailand	3–0	9–0	Friendly	

== Honors ==
North Carolina Tar Heels

- Women's College Cup: 2003, 2006

Sky Blue FC

- WPS Championship: 2009

FC Kansas City

- NWSL Champions: 2015

Arsenal

- FA WSL Cup: 2017–18

North Carolina Courage

- NWSL Champions: 2018, 2019
- NWSL Shield: 2018, 2019

Shelbourne FC

- WNL Champions: 2022
- FAI Women's Cup: 2022

United States U19

- FIFA U-19 Women's World Championship: 2002

United States

- Olympic Gold Medal: 2004, 2008, 2012
- FIFA Women's World Cup: 2015

Individual

- Honda Sports Award: 2006–07
- NWSL Second Best XI: 2014
- FIFA Puskás Award Nominee: 2011
- WPS All-Star Team: 2010
- MVP, WPS Championship Game: 2009
- WPS All-Star team selection: 2009, 2010
- Soccer America Player of the Year Award: 2006
- College Cup Offensive MVP: 2003, 2006
- ACC Offensive Player of the Year: 2005
- ESPN the Magazine All-Academic Player of the Year: 2006
- Gatorade National High School Girls' Soccer Player of the Year: 2002
- For their first match of March 2019, the women of the United States women's national soccer team each wore a jersey with the name of a woman they were honoring on the back; Kelley O'Hara chose the name of Heather O'Reilly.

== See also ==
- List of multiple Olympic gold medalists in one event
- List of Olympic medalists in soccer
- List of soccer players with 100 or more caps
- List of University of North Carolina at Chapel Hill Olympians
- List of University of North Carolina at Chapel Hill alumni
