= Sean Wheelock =

MMA and Soccer Broadcaster

- Born: Shawnee, Kansas, U.S.
- Other name: The Big Wheel
- Occupations: Sports broadcaster: MMA; Soccer, Commissioner of Kansas Athletic Commission

Sean Wheelock (born 1974) is an American mixed martial arts and soccer commentator based in Shawnee, Kansas. He served as the commentator for the M-1 Challenge and served as the play-by-play television commentator for Bellator Fighting Championships from April 2010 until July 2015. He also reports on the CONCACAF region of football for the BBC World Service. In 2013, he became a commentator for FC Kansas City.

He once featured regularly on The World Football Phone-In, which airs weekly as part of "Up All Night" on BBC Radio 5, with the nickname "the Big Wheel", but eventually left to devote more time to mixed martial arts. In the past he has worked as a commentator for XM Radio at the 2006 World Cup, as well as for ESPN and Fox Soccer Channel.

On January 24, 2009, Wheelock served as the play-by-play commentator for the pay-per-view broadcast of Affliction M-1 Global Day of Reckoning.

On July 19, 2012, Wheelock appeared as a guest announcer on TNA Impact Wrestling.

On July 1, 2015, Wheelock was appointed as a Commissioner of Kansas Athletic Commission by Kansas Governor Sam Brownback.

Wheelock collaborated with Art Davie to write a non-fiction book, Is This Legal?: The Inside Story of The First UFC From the Man Who Created It, which was published by Ascend Books on July 1, 2014.
