= Tobi Adebayo-Rowling =

English footballer (born 1996)

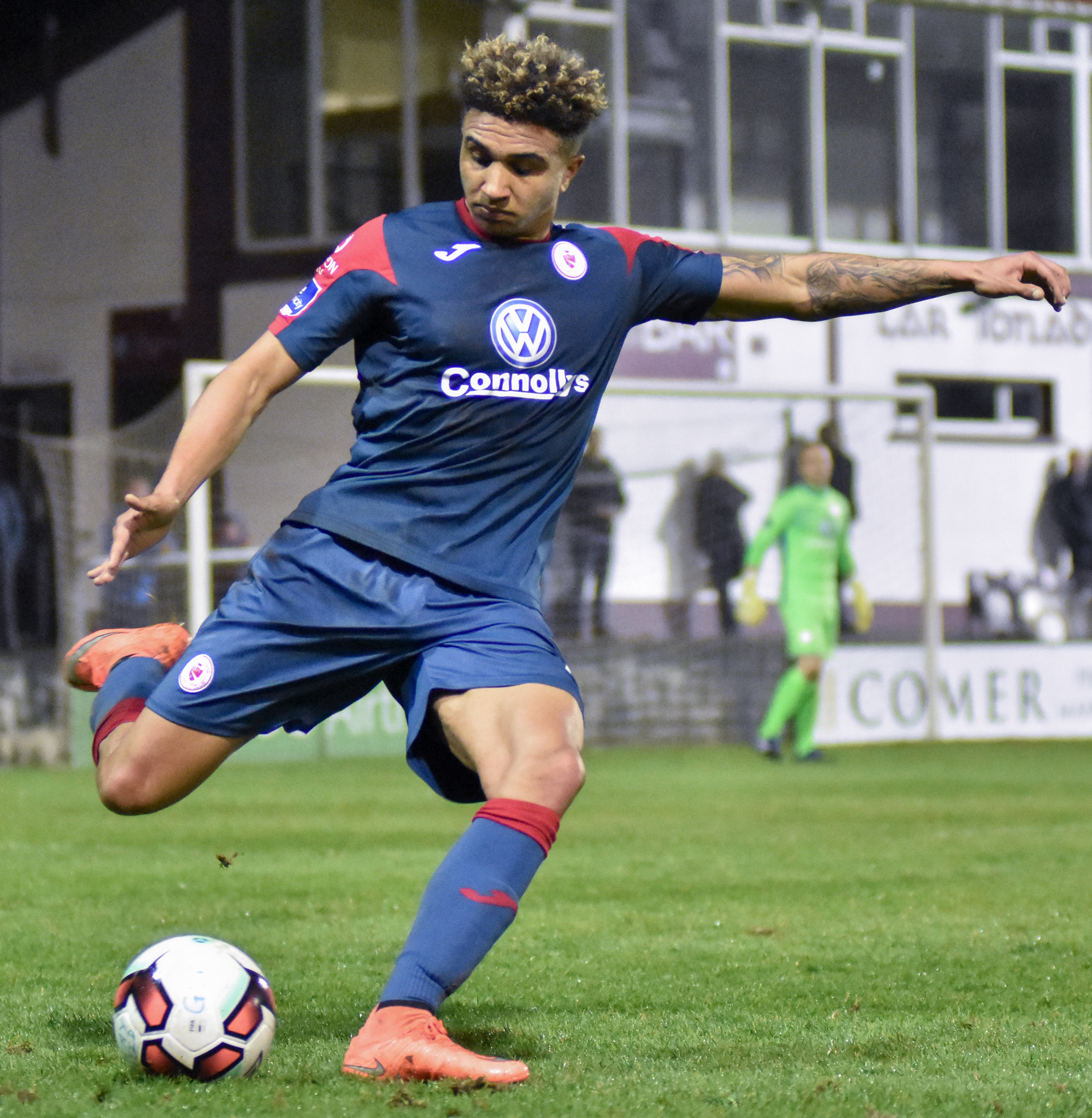
- Adebayo-Rowling in 2016

Personal information
- Full name: Olutobi Adebayo-Rowling
- Date of birth: 16 November 1996 (age 29)
- Place of birth: Camden Town, England
- Height: 1.82 m (6 ft 0 in)
- Positions: Full-back; winger

Team information
- Current team: Rochdale
- Number: 13

Youth career
- 2012–2013: Brighton & Hove Albion
- 2013–2015: Eastbourne Borough
- 2015: Peterborough United

Senior career*
Years	Team	Apps	(Gls)
2015–2016	Peterborough United	5	(0)
2016–2017	Sligo Rovers	60	(0)
2017–2018	Cork City	1	(0)
2018	Bromley	10	(0)
2018	→ Eastbourne Borough (loan)	2	(0)
2018–2020	Eastbourne Borough	55	(0)
2020–2022	Ebbsfleet United	39	(1)
2022–2024	Notts County	30	(0)
2024–	Rochdale	77	(2)
- * Club domestic league appearances and goals as of 18 September 2026

Olutobi Adebayo-Rowling (born 16 November 1996) is an English professional footballer who plays as a defender for EFL League Two club Rochdale.

== Career ==
=== Peterborough United ===
Signed on a youth contract in 2012 by Brighton & Hove Albion but was released 12 months later. He then signed a youth contract with Eastbourne Borough. Spotted by a Peterborough United scout, he then transferred as a youth to Peterborough United, before signing professional contract terms with the club in March 2015. In March 2015, Adebayo-Rowling signed a two-year professional contract for Peterborough United from the Peterborough United youth academy, where he would work with first team coach Dave Robertson, the former boss of the Brighton youth team. A month later, Adebayo-Rowling was initially given a number 31 shirt when he appeared as an unused substitute on 3 April 2015, in a 2–0 loss against Scunthorpe United.

Ahead of the 2015–16 season, Adebayo-Rowling was given a number 19 shirt, having switched from 31 shirt. On 8 August 2015, he made his first team debut, playing the entire game in a 2–0 away defeat against Rochdale for the club's first game of the 2015-2016 League One season. He continued to hold his place in the right-back position, appearing four times throughout August. However, after Robertson's sacking, he soon lost his first team place following the arrival of Manager Graham Westley and never played again after that, although he appeared once as an unused substitute in November 2015. In February 2016, it was announced that his contract was ended by mutual consent.

=== Sligo Rovers ===
Shortly after his release by Peterborough United, Adebayo-Rowling moved to Ireland when he joined League of Ireland side Sligo Rovers on 1 February 2016.

Adebayo-Rowling made his Sligo Rovers debut, starting the whole game in the right-back position, in a 2–0 loss against Shamrock Rovers in the opening game of the season. He was then named in the League of Ireland Team of the Week on Matchday 13 following a 1–0 win over Bohemians. Adebayo-Rowling's performances resulted him in signing a contract extension for another season. He was also named League of Ireland Team of the Week on Matchday 30 following his performance, in a 3–0 win over Dundalk on 8 October 2016. Despite missing one game, due to suspension, Adebayo-Rowling went on to make a total of 32 appearances in all competitions, where he quickly established himself in the first team, playing at right-back. At the end of the 2016 season, Adebayo-Rowling was voted the club's Young Player of the Year.

Ahead of the 2017 season, Adebayo-Rowling spent two weeks training on his return to England at Crystal Palace and Portsmouth but no deal materialised. Despite this, Adebayo-Rowling continued to be a regular in the first team at Sligo Rovers and started every match He also struggled to recapture the sort of form from the previous season. After returning from suspension, Adebayo-Rowling managed to regain his first team place, although he suffered setbacks later in the season. Adebayo-Rowling went on to make 28 appearances in all competitions in the 2017 season.

=== Cork City ===
On 7 November 2017, Adebayo-Rowling signed for Cork City.

=== Bromley ===
In June 2018, Adebayo-Rowling returned to England to sign for National League side Bromley.

=== Ebbsfleet United ===
On 24 July 2020, Adebayo-Rowling signed for National League South side Ebbsfleet United.

He scored his first goal for the club in a 3–2 defeat to Maidstone United on 23 November 2021.

=== Notts County ===
On 30 May 2022, Adebayo-Rowling signed for National League club Notts County on a two-year contract having turned down offers from several EFL clubs.

=== Rochdale ===
On 4 June 2024, Adebayo-Rowling signed a one-year contract with Rochdale.

On 7 March 2025, Adebayo-Rowling signed a one-year contract extension until summer 2026.

== Personal life ==
His uncle is BBC Radio presenter Dotun Adebayo, who is the brother of Tobi's father Adebayo-Rowling attended Longhill High School in Rottingdean, just outside Brighton. He appeared on the 5Live's World Football Phone-in in 2023, discussing the history of the game alongside Dotun Adebayo and Tim Vickery.

== Career statistics ==
As of match played 14 March 2020.

Club statistics
Club	Season	League			Cup		League Cup		Other		Total	
Club	Season	Division	Apps	Goals	Apps	Goals	Apps	Goals	Apps	Goals	Apps	Goals
Peterborough United	2015–16	League One	4	0	0	0	1	0	0	0	5	0
Sligo Rovers	2016	League of Ireland	32	0	2	0	1	0	0	0	35	0
Sligo Rovers	2017	League of Ireland	28	0	0	0	2	0	0	0	30	0
Sligo Rovers	Total		60	0	2	0	3	0	0	0	65	0
Cork City	2018	League of Ireland	1	0	0	0	1	0	2 (Note: One appearance and one goal in Munster Senior Cup, one appearance in President of Ireland's Cup)	1	4	1
Bromley	2018–19	National League	10	0	0	0	—		0	0	10	0
Eastbourne Borough (loan)	2018–19	National League South	2	0	2	0	—		0	0	4	0
Eastbourne Borough	2018–19	National League South	27	0	0	0	—		5 (Note: Two appearances in Sussex Senior Challenge Cup, three appearances in FA Trophy)	0	32	0
Eastbourne Borough	2019–20	National League South	28	0	0	0	—		7 (Note: Four appearances in Sussex Senior Challenge Cup, three appearances in FA Trophy)	0	35	0
Eastbourne Borough	Total		55	0	0	0	—		12	0	67	0
Career total			132	0	4	0	5	0	14	1	155	1

== Honours ==
Notts County

- National League play-offs: 2023

Rochdale

- National League play-offs: 2026
