= Yardie (novel) =

Book by Victor Headley

- First edition
- Author: Victor Headley
- Language: English
- Publisher: London, UK: X Press
- Publication date: 1992
- Publication place: United Kingdom
- Media type: Print

Yardie was the debut novel of Jamaican-born British writer Victor Headley, being described as "the publishing story of 1992" when it became the first title produced by Dotun Adebayo's newly established X Press.

== Background ==
The novel achieved impressive sales, initially through outlets other than traditional bookshops; according to Goodreads: "Yardie is, quite simply, a literary sensation in England. Originally published by X Press, a two-man operation, the book was produced on a desktop computer and distributed through unusual channels: it was sold at clothing shops, hairdressers, and even on top of over-turned dumpsters outside of nightclubs. On word of mouth alone, Yardie has sold over twelve thousand copies." It went on to sell some 30,000 copies. Interviewed by Vastiana Belfon for the New Statesman, X Press co-founder Steve Pope said: "It was the first populist black title aimed at a black audience, and its sales success prompted W H Smith to set up black writing sections in its stores. Other booksellers soon followed."

Set largely in 1980s Hackney, the novel borrows its title from yardie, a term stemming from the slang name originally given to occupants of "government yards" — social housing projects with very basic amenities, and is based on the fictional story a young Jamaican's rise from the streets of London to the top of the drug-dealing underworld. Publishers Weekly (reviewing the Atlantic Monthly Press edition) called Yardie a "well-crafted crime story", saying: "A planned sequel may perhaps provide insight into the gangster at the center of the intriguing world Headley has created."

== Film adaptation ==
In 2016 it was revealed that Idris Elba was to make his directorial debut with an adaptation of Yardie. Elba confirmed: "It's actually a smaller capsule story within the story of Yardie. It's about a boy who comes from Jamaica and finds himself in London, being a naughty boy. You're going to see a muscular, dynamic and heartfelt film that means something to people. I want people to come out of the film and say 'Hmm, I feel like going to Jamaica now!' That's the idea." The film stars Aml Ameen, with Stephen Graham in a supporting role, and was released in 2018.
