= Mark Gleeson (journalist) =

South African journalist and football commentator

- Born: January 21, 1964 (age 62); Cape Town
- Other names: Springboca Junior, The Anorak's Anorak
- Occupations: journalist, commentator, archivist

Mark Gleeson is a South African journalist and football commentator for SuperSport. He is thought to have the most complete set of African football records in existence.

He has written for BBC, Reuters and ESPN and is the African expert for the BBC's World Football Phone In. He has also been photographed in the Serbian version of Playboy. When the magazine wanted proof he was a real person, he sent a photograph of his big toe.

He is the official archivist for African football for FIFA. In 2017, the Confederation of African Football awarded him a Gold Order of Merit for services to African football.
