= Saint Bartholomew's School =

Coordinates: 40.432341°N 74.422324°W

Location
- 470 Ryders Lane; East Brunswick, Middlesex County, New Jersey 08816

Information
- School type: Coeducational, Catholic Private
- Religious affiliation: Catholic
- Established: c1964
- Chaplain: Thomas J. Walsh
- Grades: Pre-k to Eighth
- Website: http://www.stbartseb.com/

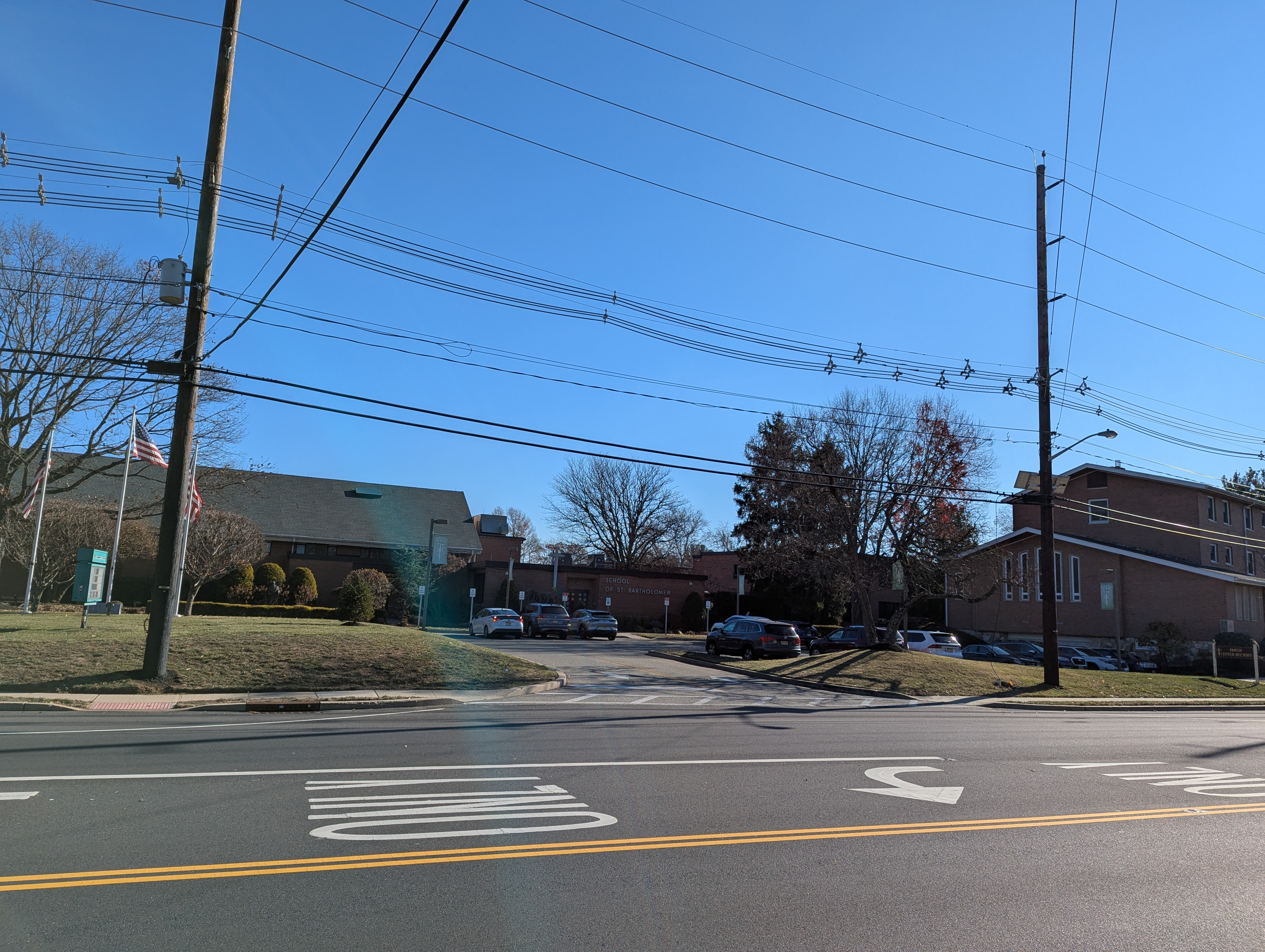
Saint Bartholomew’s School

Saint Bartholomew's School is a private coeducational Catholic school for students in pre-kindergarten to eighth grade in East Brunswick, New Jersey, USA. Founded in 1964 under the guidance of Monsignor J. Morgan Kelly, the school has grow in size to 375 students in the 2020-2021 school year. It is accredited by the Diocesan and Common Core State Standards along with Cognia.

== History ==
The need for a parish became apparent in the 1950s. A new parish called Saint Bartholomew's was created on June 12, 1959 under Father J. Morgan Kelly. The new parish consisted of 879 families who wanted a new school. The school was founded in 1964 with 130 pupils in first and second grade, with a new grade level added each year.

In 1982, the parish was assimilated into the Diocese of Metuchen under Bishop Theodore E. McCarrick.

The 1984-85 year added morning and afternoon kindergarten.

In 2008, Thomas Walsh was installed as the new presiding pastor.

== Academics ==
Students who graduate from this school go to East Brunswick High School.

Funding for the school is derived from 75% tuition, 10% parish subsidy and 15% HSA through fundraising. Tuition for the 2020-2021 year is as follows:

Child	Catholic	Non-Catholic
First Child	$4,950	
Second Child		Contact Principal's Office
Third Child		Contact Principal's Office
Fourth Child	$0	$0

== Athletics ==
The school has both co-ed basketball and cross country teams.

Heather O'Reilly, a professional soccer player, played soccer for the school, before joining the East Brunswick High School Soccer Team.
