= Tim Vickery =

Football commentator based in Brazil

- Born: 25 May 1965 (age 60); Aldershot, England
- Occupation: Football journalist
- Years active: 1994–present
- Employer: Freelance
- Notable credit(s): BBC Sport, World Soccer, ESPN, Sports Illustrated, Redação SporTV, Sky Sports Transfer Talk, PL Brasil

Tim Vickery (born 25 May 1965) is a freelance English football journalist, who has lived in Brazil since 1994. He is the South American football correspondent for BBC Sport, contributing to the corporation's output online, on TV and radio. Vickery frequently writes for World Soccer, ESPN, Sports Illustrated and PL Brasil, and he is also an analyst on SporTV's main morning programme, Redação SporTV.

== Early life ==
After leaving school, he took a series of jobs, ranging from menswear shop assistant, labourer, comedy writer, box office assistant and finally a theatre manager in the West End of London. There he met a series of international performance people, becoming fascinated with the Brazilian pre-occupation with football. As a result, in 1994 having trained as a TEFL teacher, he left the UK and travelled to Brazil to teach English, learn the local language and immerse himself in Brazilian football. Supporting himself through his TEFL income, he started writing a series of articles for various Brazilian football fanzines.

== Journalism ==
Today Vickery is perhaps best known for his work on The World Football Phone-in, which airs weekly, hosted by Dotun Adebayo, as part of Up All Night on BBC Radio 5 Live on Tuesday mornings (1.00-4.00 am UK, 8.00-11.00 pm ET). On the show Vickery is known as the 'Legendinho' or 'Vikipedia' for his vast knowledge of football in Brazil, and South America in general.

Vickery starred in International Football Factories (2006) with Danny Dyer, a documentary about football hooligans in Brazil.

As of 2008, Vickery is Brazilian correspondent for World Soccer Daily and continues his role on World Football Daily, the video podcast that replaced WSD. Since May 2011, he published weekly news on Sambafoot.com website. He occasionally appears on football discussion programmes on the Brazilian television channel SporTV.

Vickery appeared as a pundit on the BBC, throughout their coverage of the 2014 World Cup during which time saw his number of Twitter followers double in size.

Vickery also appeared as a BBC commentator for the movie The Game of Their Lives, based on the famous 1950 U.S. soccer team which, against all odds, beat England 1–0 in the city of Belo Horizonte, Brazil during the 1950 FIFA World Cup.

Vickery cites as his main journalistic influences the "old style" of Brian Glanville, whose "international consciousness" always appealed, as well as the "social consciousness" of Hugh McIlvanney, formerly of The Sunday Times.

Since June of 2023, he writes as a columnist on the Brazilian website PL Brasil.

== Personal life ==
Originally from Hemel Hempstead in Hertfordshire, Vickery lives with his wife and two stepdaughters in Rio de Janeiro. In addition to his native English, he is fluent in both Portuguese and Spanish. Vickery has supported Tottenham Hotspur since childhood.
