= World Football Phone-In =

World Football Phone-in
- Genre: Phone-in
- Country of origin: United Kingdom
- Language: English
- Home station: BBC Radio 5 Live
- Hosted by: Dotun Adebayo
- Opening theme: "Soccer fan" Real Sounds of Africa
- Website: https://www.bbc.co.uk/programmes/p02p9f7d
- Podcast: https://www.bbc.co.uk/programmes/p02p9f7d/episodes/downloads

The World Football Phone-in is a British weekly radio phone-in show about association football around the world. Hosted by Dotun Adebayo, it is part of the nightly Up All Night programming on BBC Radio 5 Live which he presents. The football show is broadcast from 1 am to 4 am on Tuesday mornings, and is also released as a podcast. Regular contributors are awarded a 'Brazilian shirt name' as a nickname.

Occasionally the entire programme (1 – 5 am) is dedicated to the phone-in.

== Pundits ==
Knowledge about players and clubs from different parts of the world, and, in Adebayo's words, 'players from over there playing in our leagues', is provided by using selected experts each week who have knowledge about a specific confederation, currently drawn from:

- "Legendinho" = Tim Vickery (South America)
- "Springboca Junior" = Mark Gleeson (Africa)
- "Galatasarahs" = Paul Sarahs (Europe/World)
- "Northern Seoul" = John Duerden (Asia)
- "The Colonel" = Mina Rzouki (Europe)
- "Viva Mark Vegas" = Mark Meadows (Europe)
- "Chicken Tikka Mo Salah" = Maher Mezahi (North Africa)
- "Deportivo Lankan" = Mark Machado (Europe)
- "Hallam Brazil" = Seth Bennett (Europe)
- "The Avon Lady" = Julia Belas Trinidade (Buenos Aires, ARG)

Former pundits include:

- "The Big Wheel" = Sean Wheelock (CONCACAF)
- "Top Brass" = Andy Brassell (Europe)
- Lester Smith (CONCACAF)
- Mani Djazmi (Asia)
- "Leone Ranger" = Durosimi Thomas (Africa)
- "The Uxbridge Massive" = Hiral Bhatt (Africa)
- "Neigh-mar" = Jon Arnold (CONCACAF)
