= Yardie (film) =

2018 crime drama film

- Film poster
- Directed by: Idris Elba
- Screenplay by: Brock Norman Brock; Martin Stellman
- Based on: Yardie by Victor Headley
- Produced by: Gina Carter; Robin Gutch
- Starring: Aml Ameen; Shantol Jackson; Stephen Graham; Fraser James; Sheldon Shepherd; Everaldo Creary
- Cinematography: John Conroy
- Edited by: Justine Wright
- Music by: Dickon Hinchliffe
- Production companies: StudioCanal; BBC Films; Screen Yorkshire; British Film Institute; Warp Films; Island Records; Amazon Prime Video
- Distributed by: StudioCanal
- Release dates: 20 January 2018 (Sundance); 31 August 2018 (United Kingdom)
- Running time: 101 minutes
- Country: United Kingdom
- Language: English
- Box office: $1.5 million

Yardie is a 2018 British crime drama film directed by Idris Elba, in his feature directorial debut, and starring Aml Ameen, Shantol Jackson, Stephen Graham, Fraser James, Sheldon Shepherd, and Everaldo Creary. It is based on the novel of the same name by Jamaican-born writer Victor Headley. It was screened in the World Cinema Dramatic Competition section at the 2018 Sundance Film Festival.

== Plot ==
Dennis "D" Campbell lives with his peace-loving brother Jerry Dread in 1973 West Kingston, Jamaica. D loves a local schoolgirl named Yvonne but their relationship is hindered by an ongoing gang war between the Tappas, led by Skeeter, and the Spicers, led by King Fox. Tired of the violence and destruction in the streets, Jerry Dread organises a DJ session between the two gangs' territories, hoping to broker peace. The peace is quickly shattered when Jerry Dread is shot and killed by Clancy Hibbert, one of D's classmates and an aspiring gang member.

In 1983, an adult D has become a hardened enforcer for Fox, who works as both a record producer and drug lord. After bungling one of Fox's drug deals due to his volatile behaviour, D is sent by Fox to Hackney, London where he must deliver a package of cocaine to White Jamaican gangster Rico Grimes.

D arrives in London but hesitates to make the delivery after hearing Rico flippantly insult his late brother. He flees from Rico's nightclub, taking the cocaine with him before reuniting with Yvonne. Yvonne had long fled to London with her and D's daughter Vanessa to escape the violence in Kingston; she does not welcome D's presence, but agrees to let him stay. While staying, D suspects Clancy, his brother's killer, is in London.

One day, a group of youths burgle Yvonne's flat while D is there, hoping to steal the cocaine he had stolen. After stopping them, D is directed by the youths to a potential buyer of the cocaine in the form of a Turkish crime lord. Using the money he has earned from the sale, D tries to provide Yvonne and Vanessa with the good life. He also uses the money to help the youths fix their sound system and eventually joins them for gigs.

Not long after, D is recognised and ambushed by Rico's men and Yvonne kicks him out after her daughter was fake-kidnapped. D goes to Rico's nightclub to return the money and is only spared because of Fox's influence.

Directionless, D falls back to his last remaining objective: finding Clancy in hopes of avenging his brother. After being pointed in the right direction by Sticks, one of the DJs, D confronts Clancy at his home. He is then ambushed by Rico's lieutenants, resulting in Clancy's escape and Sticks' death.

Yvonne seeks out Clancy and learns that Fox has something to do with Jerry's death. That night, as D takes up Sticks' place in the DJ group for a concert at Rico's nightclub, Yvonne tells him what Clancy told her and begs him not to go, but is rebuffed. At the same time, King Fox arrives in London to meet with Rico and pacify the situation. During the DJ session, Rico insults Fox and threatens to kill D himself, leading the latter to strangle him to death.

King Fox later meets D in a hallway where he reassures D about what Clancy told him. Clancy then ambushes them both, claiming that Fox had hired him that fateful night, forcing D to kill him in self defense. An injured Fox inadvertently reveals his role in Jerry's death, causing D to question him. King Fox reveals the truth: Jerry wasn't supposed to die that night, Skeeter was the target but Clancy missed and hit Jerry. Angered by the revelation, D kills King Fox. The ghost of Jerry, having followed D's guilty conscience throughout the film, fades away. In a flash forward leading to Fox's execution, D and Yvonne are shown happily together with their two children.

== Cast ==
- Aml Ameen as Dennis "D" Campbell
- Shantol Jackson as Yvonne
- Sheldon Shepherd as King Fox
- Stephen Graham as Rico Grimes
- Fraser James as Piper
- Everaldo Creary as Jerry Dread Campbell
- Akin Gazi as Arif
- Mark Rhino Smith as Raggz
- Naomi Ackie as Mona
- Calvin Demba as Sticks

== Production ==
Several scenes, including high-paced car chases set in London, were filmed at the Chatham Historic Dockyard in Kent, doubling up for East London in the 1970s. The Dockyard also features as the wider area where Rico's (Stephen Graham) club is located and D. (Aml Ameen) is chased through the streets and over the roofs at night by Rico's men.

== Reception ==
On review aggregator Rotten Tomatoes, the film holds an approval rating of 54%, based on 76 reviews with an average rating of 5.8/10. The site's critical consensus reads "Yardie proves debuting director Idris Elba has a distinctive eye that benefits from a strong personal connection to his material, even if the end results are somewhat uneven." Metacritic gives the film a weighted average score of 52 out of 100, based on 18 reviews, indicating "mixed or average reviews".

== See also ==
- List of black films of the 2010s
- List of hood films
