= Jim Davis (radio presenter) =

British radio presenter

Jim Davis is a British radio presenter, who presents on Magic Radio, Mellow Magic, Magic at the Musicals and BBC Local Radio.

== Background ==
Davis was born in South Africa. Davis's passion for radio began when his cousin asked him to stand in for her on a BBC radio programme in Cumbria.

== Radio career ==
Davis worked at Signal 1, a radio station playing new pop music in Stoke-on-Trent. While at Signal 1, he co-presented the breakfast show with Paula White, whom he would later work with again at Century FM. He presented the breakfast show on Century FM in Nottingham from 2002 until approximately 2004.

As of 2007, Davis was presenting a weekday lunchtime wellbeing programme on LBC 97.3. In the same year, in between presenting two editions of the show, Davis took part in the London Bikeathon to raise money for Leukaemia Research. In early 2009, Davis was presenting on Friday and Saturday late evenings on the station; in March 2009, Davis stopped presenting his Saturday late evening show but continued presenting Friday late evenings.

From 2009 until 2010, Davis presented the breakfast show on Heart Cambridge.

In early 2011, he began presenting between 9am and midday on weekdays at BBC Radio Leicester. In 2014, he began co-presenting the breakfast show with Jo Hayward between 6am and 9am on the station. Davis and Hayward were judges at an NHS Trust awards ceremony in 2016. In September 2017 he began presenting a show on BBC Radio London which was broadcast between 2am and 6am on Saturdays and Sundays, and between 1am and 4am on Mondays. In 2020, his show began to be broadcast nationally across the UK and on BBC Radio 5 Live, due to cuts to the BBC's output as a result of the Coronavirus pandemic. In September 2021, Davis stopped presenting the show between 1am and 5am on weekends. He could also be heard doing voiceovers for the BBC around this time. In 2022, he presented a daily show on BBC Radio London for a short period.

In 2019, Davis joined the Magic family of stations. As of 2020, he presented Mellow Magic on Friday evenings, in addition to a Sunday afternoon slot, on Magic Radio. In 2022, he moved to weekend evenings on Magic Radio. He currently presents on Magic Radio between 4pm and 7pm on both days of the weekend, on Mellow Magic between 10am and 1pm on weekdays, and on Magic At The Musicals between 4pm and 7pm on weekdays.

== Television career ==
Davis has presented East Midlands Today, reported for BBC Inside Out and was a continuity announcer at weekends on ITV1 for four years.
