= Aml Ameen =

British actor (born 1985)

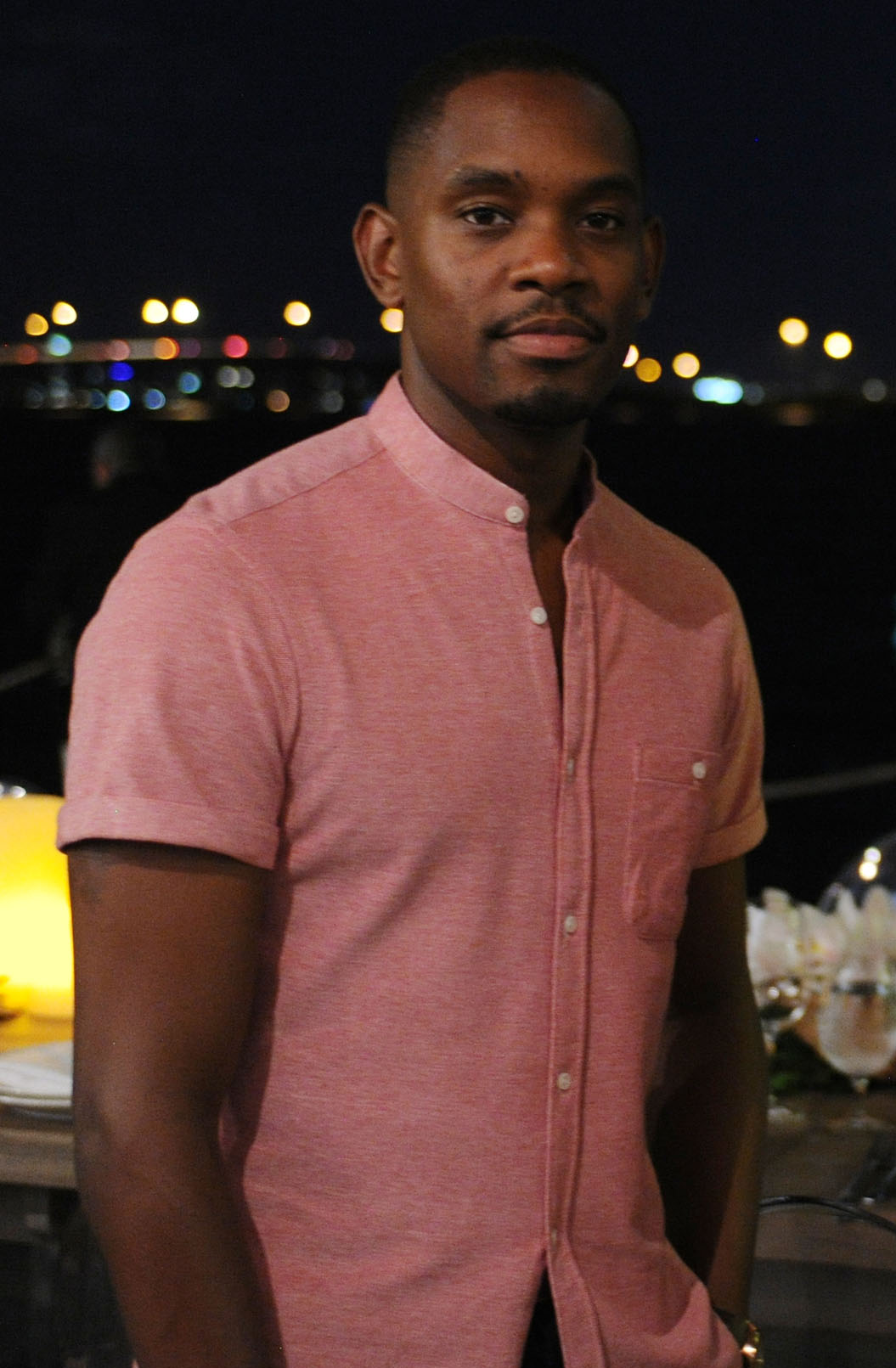
- Ameen at the 2016 Miami International Film Festival presentation of Soy Nero
- Born: 30 July 1985 (age 41); London, England
- Occupation: Actor
- Years active: 1990s–present

Aml Ameen (/əˈmɛl əˈmiːn/) (born 30 July 1985) is a British actor and filmmaker. He is best known for his roles as Trevor (Trife) in Kidulthood (2006), Malcolm Davies in Harry's Law, Lewis Hardy in the ITV television series The Bill, Capheus in the first season of the Netflix original series Sense8, and Alby in The Maze Runner (2014). His directorial debut was the 2021 romantic comedy Boxing Day.

== Early life and education ==
Aml Ameen was born on 30 July 1985 in London, England, to Jamaican and Vincentian parents. He has a sister. His parents divorced when he was 15.

He studied acting at the Barbara Speake Stage School, an independent school in London. As a child he appeared in the West End in shows such as Oliver! and Jolson. At the age of 11, he performed on stage with Michael Jackson at the 1996 BRIT Awards in a performance famously invaded by Pulp's singer Jarvis Cocker.

== Career ==
=== 2002–2011 ===
Ameen's first acting role came in 2002 ITV police series The Bill, and he had another guest stint in 2004 before joining the series full-time in 2006 as PC Lewis Hardy.

Soon after his guest appearance on The Bill in 2004, he portrayed the character Terry in Bella and the Boys, He also made one-off guest appearances in BBC soap EastEnders and medical drama Holby City. He also starred in the British youth-centred film Kidulthood as the central character Trife, while he also appeared in Second Chance and Red Tails for a special appearance.

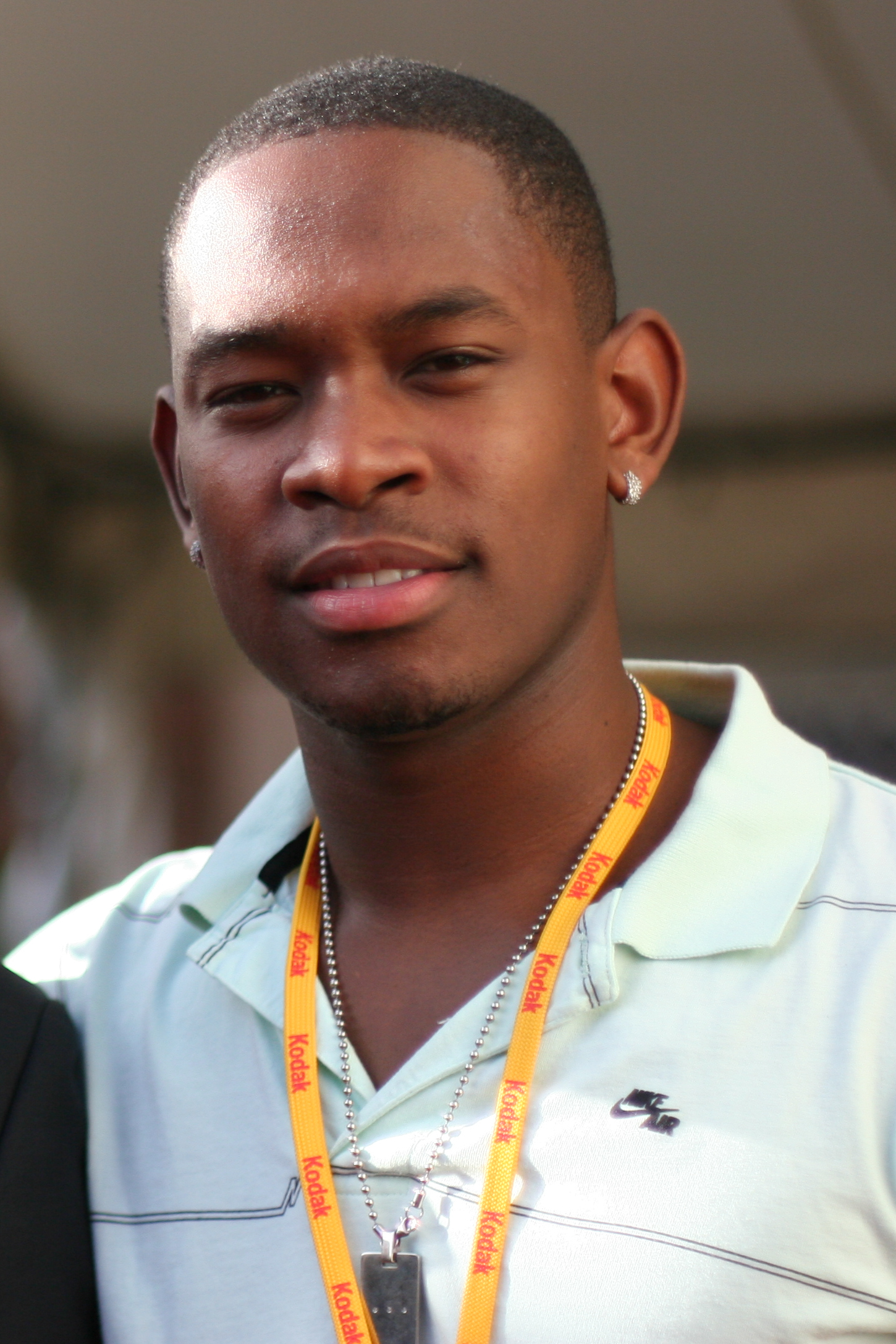
Ameen at Dinard British film festival (France), 2006

In April 2008, he played a leading role in the BBC Three teen drama Dis/Connected, playing Anthony, an 18-year-old college student from London who faces gang trouble on the streets, as well as losing his friend when she commits suicide.

Ameen featured in a film on Channel 4 called Fallout, part of their Disarming Britain mini-season. The London Lite paper described this as his most memorable performance. He featured as AJ in Silent Witness series 12 parts 1 and 2. He portrayed a youth worker trying to make a difference in a South London community, and became friends with Leo, one of the senior pathologists doing community service for drunk driving.

In June 2008, Ameen began Actors Student Alliance, a drama school set up to discover and teach untapped talent in London. From its inception, the school produced a short film and a theatre showcase for its students. Within its second year, the school expanded into a management company.

He performed at the Tricycle Theatre on the "Not Black and White" season in October 2009.

Ameen starred in season 1 of David E. Kelley's legal drama Harry's Law, which began to air on NBC in 2011.

=== 2012–2018 ===
Ameen's first Hollywood film role was in George Lucas's Red Tails (2012), about the African American Tuskegee airman in World War II. He played Alby in the 2014 film adaptation of the novel The Maze Runner.

In 2015, Ameen was one of the eight central characters in the initial run of the Netflix series Sense8, produced by the Wachowskis and J. Michael Straczynski. However, conflicts with Lana Wachowski resulted in his firing and replacement with Toby Onwumere after filming two episodes of the second season in 2016.

In 2018, Ameen starred as a young Jamaican named "D" in the film Yardie. The film was based on Victor Headley's 1992 cult novel of the same name. Actor Idris Elba made his directorial debut with the film in London and Jamaica.

=== 2020–present ===
Ameen's own debut as a director was announced in November 2020. Boxing Day was released on 3 December 2021 and, as the writer, Ameen used elements from his own life. The film stars Ameen, Aja Naomi King, Leigh-Anne Pinnock (in her film debut), Marianne Jean-Baptiste, Stephen Dillane, and Martina Laird. Boxing Day received mixed reviews.

He played the role of Tom in the podcast The Left Right Game.

In addition to his theatrical work, Ameen has used his voice to shed light on issues within the industry. In 2022, he featured in a BBC Radio 4 documentary My name Is Ricardo P Lloyd, exploring race in theatre.

== Recognition ==
He was named one of The Times newspaper's "Ones To Watch" for 2006, and won "Best actor in a TV performance" at the 2007 Screen Nation Awards.

== Filmography ==
Key
†	Denotes works that have not yet been released

=== Film ===
Year	Title	Role	Notes
2006	Kidulthood	Trevor "Trife" Hector	
2010	Shank	Bus Conductor	Cameo
2010	Second Chance	Aaron Bently	Short film
2012	Red Tails	"Bag O'Bones"	
2012	The Naked Poet	Ryan	
2013	The Butler	Young Cecil Gaines	
2013	Evidence	Officer Jensen	
2014	The Maze Runner	Alby	
2014	Beyond the Lights	Trey	
2015	Lila & Eve	Stephon	
2016	Soy Nero	Bronx	
2017	The Price	Seyi Ogunde	
2018	Yardie	Dennis "D" Campbell	
2018	Parallel	Devin	
2019	Inside Man: Most Wanted	NYPD Detective Remy Darbonne	
2020	Run Sweetheart Run	Quidda	
2021	Charming the Hearts of Men	Walter	
2021	Till Death	Tom	
2021	Boxing Day	Melvin	
2023	Dead Shot	Tempest	
2023	Rustin	Martin Luther King Jr.	

=== Television ===
Year	Title	Role	Notes
2003	EastEnders	Simon	1 episode
2003	Little Britain	Pupil	1 episode
2004	Bella and the Boys	Terry	TV film
2004	Holby City	Bradley Norris	1 episode
2006–2007	The Bill	PC Lewis Hardy	Main role
2008	Fallout	Dwayne Edmons	TV film
2008	Silent Witness	A.J.	2 episodes
2008	Dis/Connected	Anthony	TV film
2011–2012	Harry's Law	Malcolm Davies	Main cast (season 1), Guest star (season 2)
2012	CSI: Miami	Jack Brody	1 episode
2015	Sense8	Capheus	Main role (season 1)
2020	I May Destroy You	Simon	4 episodes
2022	The Porter	Junior Massey	Main role, 8 episodes
2024	A Man in Full	Roger White	Miniseries
2026	Legends	Bailey	Main cast, 6 episodes
