= Skank (magazine) =

British satirical magazine

Skank was a British satirical magazine published between 1994 and 1997 by Acreforce Ltd, an offshoot of X Press. It was aimed primarily at younger British Blacks.

== History ==
Skank was launched in April 1994. It was co-written and edited by Bobby Joseph, and drawn by Daniel Francis, Joseph Samuels and Michael Robinson. It was published by Acreforce Ltd, a publishing label set up by publisher and BBC journalist Dotun Adebayo as an offshoot of X Press. Skank ended its run in March 1997, as a result of being sued by the runner Linford Christie over the cartoon "Lunch-box Christie". Joseph went on to found a new magazine, Black Eye, which he regarded as the successor to Skank.

== Content ==
Skank was one of numerous comics similar to Viz. It has been dubbed the "Ragga Viz" or the "Black" Viz. Paul Gravett has described it as "the first adult comic by and about British blacks".

Skank examined the Black British experience in the 1990s. It pushed the boundaries of taste but also explored political satire, social commentary, sexism, homophobia, racism, and police brutality. Like Viz, Skank featured comic strips, photo strips, joke articles, and celebrity references. It featured popular comic characters satirising Black communities of London, such as "Mary Mampy" – a "bad gyal" from Peckham; "The Fugitive", a baby father on the run from his numerous baby mothers; "Scotland Yardie" – a Jamaican no-nonsense cop; "Rachel Prejudice" – a subtle dig at Black sell-outs; "White Galfriend", a look at mixed-race relationships; "Malcolm Vex", a frustrated revolutionary; and "Wendy Weave-on", a spoilt supermodel with baldness issues.

Spoof news stories frequently appeared in Skank, such as "Government ban on Ugly Women", "Pubic Weave Extensions", "Free Ganja competitions", and "Yam Throwing - new Olympic Sport announced". The magazine satirised the Brixton riots of 1981, and mocked Black celebrities such as Christie and the boxer Chris Eubank.
