= Tom Swarbrick =

English broadcaster (born 1987)

Tom Swarbrick (born 30 March 1987) is an English radio talk show host and presenter who currently hosts the drivetime show on LBC radio as well as appearing on other channels, such as ITV. He was Head of Broadcast at Downing Street between 2016 and 2018 and is also a former adviser to Prime Minister Theresa May.

== Early life ==
Tom Swarbrick grew up in Oxfordshire and attended Abingdon School, where his father, Andrew Swarbrick, was Head of English. He then went to the University of Cambridge to read theology, graduating in 2008.

== Career ==
Swarbrick joined the BBC in 2009 as a producer and presenter on local radio. He joined LBC in June 2012 initially as a journalist before becoming Chief Correspondent in 2015. He then presented his own afternoon show on the weekend between 12 and 3pm, becoming the youngest presenter of a national talk radio show.

Swarbrick left LBC in August 2016 to join the Senior broadcast team at Downing Street as Head of Broadcast. He was an adviser to then Prime Minister Theresa May during the election of Donald Trump as US president, the triggering of Article 50 and subsequent Brexit negotiations, and the 2017 general election. He left the role in March 2018.

Swarbrick returned to LBC in spring 2018 to present the weekend breakfast show.

In August of that year, he moved to LBC's late-night 10pm to 1am weekday slot, replacing Ian Collins, and began a new Sunday morning programme called Swarbrick on Sunday.

In September 2022, Swarbrick moved to drivetime, 4pm to 6pm, replacing Eddie Mair, who retired after 40 years of broadcasting. Swarbrick was replaced by Colin Brazier in the Sunday morning slot.

In 2018, Swarbrick was accused of sharing questions prior to an interview with a Cabinet Minister, in an attempt to get him on his show. According to BuzzFeed, Swarbrick made assurances "that the minister would be safe and the interview would be gentle." He also interviewed the then Prime Minister, Theresa May, shortly after re-joining LBC.

In April 2022, Nathan McGovern, an activist from Just Stop Oil, glued his hand to the microphone during an interview with Swarbrick. McGovern claimed he was taking a stand against the station because it was not promoting the climate crisis.

Swarbrick is a regular contributor on Sky News, CNN, Good Morning Britain and This Morning.

== Awards ==
During his time at the BBC, Swarbrick was nominated for a Sony Radio Academy Award. Swarbrick was named National Radio Journalist of the Year at the 2014 Radio Academy Awards for his documentary on people-trafficking in London. He was also named International Reporter of the Year.

== Personal life ==
Swarbrick lives in Tonbridge, Kent. He is married with children. He is a fan of Preston North End F.C.
