= Victor Headley =

Jamaican-born British author (born 1959)

Victor Headley (born 1959) is a Jamaican-born British author. He is the author of the bestselling novel Yardie (1992), which gained cult status upon publication and "heralded a new wave of black British pulp fiction". Other books by Headley include Excess (1993) Yush (1994), Fetish (1995), Here Comes the Bride (1997), Off Duty (2001) and Seven Seals (2003).

== Biography ==
Born in Jamaica, Headley came to live in London at the age of 12 and after leaving school had a variety of jobs, from market stallholder to songwriter/band member, journalist to hospital courier. Headley's attempts to write a screenplay became his first novel, Yardie, which describes the life of a Jamaican courier carrying cocaine from Jamaica to London. The book helped to launch X Press, a black-owned publishing company co-founded in 1992 by Dotun Adebayo and Steve Pope. Headley has sold more than half a million copies across five titles, in five languages worldwide.

Headley's Yardie has been adapted as a feature film of the same name, released in 2018. In 2017, actor Idris Elba announced the book as the vehicle for his directorial debut, with Aml Ameen starring as the main character "D". Also starring are British actors Mark Smith and Naomi Ackie.

== Other sources ==
- Dyer, Rebecca (2004). Generations of Black Londoners: Echoes of 1950's Caribbean Migrants' Voices in Victor Headley's Yardie and Zadie Smith's White Teeth. Obsidian III: Literature in the African Diaspora, 5(2), 81–102.
- Farred, Grant (Winter 2001). "The Postcolonial Chickens Come Home to Roost: How Yardie Has Created a New Postcolonial Subaltern", The South Atlantic Quarterly 100.1 (2001), 287–305.
- Howe, Darcus. "The Yardie Has Been Invented by White Journalists", New Statesman (2 August 1999).
