= WaveLength =

Charitable organisation in the United Kingdom

- Formation: 1939; 86 years ago
- Founder: BBC
- Location: United Kingdom
- Services: Providing televisions, radios, and tablets to those in need
- Website: wavelength.org.uk

WaveLength, previously known as Wireless for the Bedridden Society and W4B, is a charitable organisation in the United Kingdom, set up to work with people experiencing social isolation.

== History ==
The charity was founded after Charles Stonebridge gave an address to his local Rotary Club in 1938, following a recent visit to Manchester where he had spoken to an organisation there which was providing radios (wirelesses) for people of limited means. The Rotary Club joined forces with the BBC to found a charity helping similar people living in London, the Greater London Society Providing Wirelesses for the Bedridden. Key founding members included HG Brewster, AJ Pilgrim, FW Lovell, C Stonebridge, W Cady and the BBC’s John Underdown. By 1953, the Rev. Alfred Pilgrim was the only original founding member still involved with the society. He remained on the board until his death in 1968 and received an MBE in recognition of his work, becoming the driving force within the charity. In his obituary in the charity’s newsletter, editors wrote that he hated all unhappiness and suffering and "strongly believed that the well-being of each should be the concern of all."

The society went into hibernation during the Second World War and re-emerged in 1945. In 1946, it changed its name to Wireless for the Bedridden Society to reflect that it planned to extend its services to the whole of the United Kingdom. The charity remained based in central London until 1979 before moving to Upminster in Essex and then to its current headquarters in Hornchurch, Essex. Traditionally, WaveLength has had the Archbishop of Canterbury as its president.

=== 2010–present ===
As its original name became outdated, the charity became known as W4B. In 2010, the charity took on the larger name of ‘WaveLength’. WaveLength incorporates the digital, as well as analogue devices that it provides, and a possible expansion into internet provision.

WaveLength has worked with Women's Aid to give TVs, radios, and DVD players to domestic violence refuges across the country. It also provides TVs to centres helping victims of torture.

Alongside the gift of technology, the charity also aims to provide a voice to vulnerable people through advocacy. WaveLength has been involved in several consumer forums including the Consumer Expert Group, and has testified before the House of Lords on the UK’s digital switchover plans.

Representatives of the BBC, UTV, the Rotary Club, and the charity's sister organisation Wireless for the Blind, sit as trustees on the charity's board.

As of 2014, the charity had started providing tablet computers to lonely and isolated people living in poverty, as well as radios and TVs.

== Policy interventions ==
In 2017, WaveLength and the BBC collaborated to protect women and men living in Domestic Abuse refuges. The rules affecting television licenses in refuges had long been unclear and impractical. The policy change meant that everyone living in a refuge is now covered by one communal license. Refuges are now eligible for the same rules as hospitals and hotels, which allow all residents to share one licence regardless of how long they stay or how many residents there are at once. By changing this policy, more abuse survivors can benefit from a TV of their own during their time in refuge.

== Charity theme tune ==
In 2011 WaveLength became the first UK charity to have its own ringtone theme tune, or 'audible signature'. This was created and donated by Andy Cato of Groove Armada. Cato calls music the 'universal language', and says that he created the ringtone because it was a chance to make a 'specific contribution' to a cause. The tune 'conveyed a sense of hopefulness. It was then a question of adding a melody, which has the potential to be emblematic in a short space of time.'
