= Dotun Adebayo =

British radio presenter

Dotun Adebayo MBE
- Born: Oludotun Davey Moore Adebayo; Lagos, Nigeria
- Other names: The Referee; The Nightwatchman
- Education: Stationers' Company's Comprehensive School; Stockholm University; University of Essex
- Occupations: Radio presenter; writer; publisher
- Known for: Up All Night; World Football Phone-In
- Spouse: Carroll Thompson
- Children: 2
- Relatives: Diran Adebayo (brother); Tobi Adebayo-Rowling (nephew)

Oludotun Davey Moore "Dotun" Adebayo MBE is a British radio presenter, writer, and publisher. He is best known for his work on Up All Night on BBC Radio 5 Live, as well as the former obituary programme Brief Lives (ended July 2007).

He is known as the "King of Overnight" Radio and also known as "Radio Dotun", the pen name by which he has recently (2023) published his noir-moir memoirs EFFRIES.

== Early life ==
Oludotun "Dotun" Adebayo was born in Lagos, Nigeria, and moved to join his parents in England at the age of six. His younger brother Diran Adebayo is a novelist, and his nephew Tobi Adebayo-Rowling is a professional footballer. As a young boy, Adebayo joined the National Youth Theatre, where he starred in Killing Time by Barrie Keeffe, Julius Caesar by Shakespeare, and several other productions.

Adebayo was educated at Woodlands Park Junior School in Tottenham, where he was in the year below Winston Silcott. He went on to Stationers' Company's Comprehensive School in Hornsey, North London, followed by Stockholm University, where he studied Literature. While there, he had a reggae segment inside a Saturday-night radio programme on Sveriges Radio P3. Also started a reggae band, Giant Steppers. He then returned to the UK to study Philosophy at the Wivenhoe Park campus of the University of Essex.

While studying at the University of Essex, and presenting two programmes on the student radio station, in 1987 Adebayo was elected president of the University of Essex Students' Union to serve in the 1987/1988 academic year. Standing as an independent, he defeated Labour Students candidate Asad Rehman. Adebayo graduated from Essex in 1987 with a BA degree in Philosophy.

Adebayo revealed during an episode of Up All Night that his middle names were "Davey Moore". His parents were boxing fans and had given him these middle names because the boxer Davey Moore had boxed and beaten British-Nigerian Hogan Bassey a year earlier. He spoke about this during the show's "Virtual Jukebox" segment when the Bob Dylan song "Who Killed Davey Moore?" had been selected by a listener.

== Career ==
The American playwright Tennessee Williams chose Adebayo to play a small part in the world premiere of his last play, The Red Devil Battery Sign, in which Adebayo acted opposite Pierce Brosnan.

Adebayo appeared in The Oblong Box (1969) at the age of eight, and as a schoolboy in the 1971 James Bond film Diamonds Are Forever. As well as claiming to have been the first black Teddy boy in London in his early teens, Adebayo also won a Rotary Club public-speaking award as a teenager, and worked for the BBC from the age of 12 on the radio programme Network Africa. Around this same time, Adebayo nearly became the latest "Milkybar Kid", narrowly missing out on the part owing to him not needing to wear glasses.

Adebayo resigned as president of the University of Essex Students' Union within a few months to take up a job with The Voice, Britain's main black newspaper, where he was music editor until 1991. His columns and articles have been published in Pride Magazine and the New Nation, as well as broadsheet and tabloid newspapers such as The Guardian, The Independent, The Times, London Evening Standard and the News of the World.

Some of these columns were compiled into books: Can I Have My Balls Back Please (2000) and its sequel Sperm Bandits (2002), the latter a humorous look at the phenomenon of sperm theft. This led to a follow-up Channel 4 docudrama Sperm Bandits. He is working on his first novel, Promised Land, an epic saga spanning 50 years in the lives of Britain's richest black family.

In 1993, while appearing on Channel 4's The Devil's Advocate opposite presenter Darcus Howe, he was spotted by GLR programme executive Gloria Abramov, who was looking for a new presenter for the Black London programme. His broadcasting work on BBC London 94.9 gave him the opportunity to present other programmes, such as the Saturday night reggae show, and he eventually "presented everything except travel!" He has recalled first appearing on BBC Radio 5 Live as a guest in July 1998, following an opinion column he had written in The Guardian, and subsequently being invited on as a frequent guest, until editor Marina Salandy Brown asked him to present the Sunday morning obituaries programme Brief Lives, which led to controller Bob Shennan giving Adebayo his big break as presenter of Up All Night. On his half-week of the Up All Night show on 5 Live, he presents both the World Football Phone-In and the Virtual Jukebox: this was a replacement for his Virtual Bookshelf.

Adebayo's television work includes writing and presenting the documentary White Girls Are Easy (for Channel 4), and the weekly show Heavy TV.

Adebayo founded the publishing company X Press, with Steve Pope, producing black fiction such as Baby Father, Victor Headley's Yardie (which became the first black British best-seller when it was published in 1992), and Cop Killer (which gained instant notoriety when 200 bullets were sent out to the press to promote the title). He is also responsible for the Nia imprint of literary black fiction, including titles such as J. California Cooper's In Search of Satisfaction, and the 20/20 imprint for current generic fiction such as the best-seller Curvy Lovebox. Adebayo also published the comic magazine Skank.

Adebayo is co-founder of Colourtelly, Britain's first general-interest black internet television station. To save costs, Adebayo uses his own house as the studio. When it launched on 1 August 2007, he had the aim of attracting 6000 subscribers to break even.

In September 2020, Adebayo became a co-presenter of On The Continent as part of the new Football Ramble Presents network, alongside Andy Brassell.

In October 2023, it was announced that Adebayo would launch a Sunday evening programme on BBC Local Radio, presented from London and starting on Sunday 12 November. His evening programme is broadcast on all BBC Local Radio stations from 6-10pm on Sundays, except for BBC Radio Lincolnshire where the station does have an hour long farming show hosted by Sean Dunderdale and Tim Walker from 7pm-10pm. Dotun Adebayo using his pen-name Radio Dotun published his 'memoirs' called Effries in October 2023 which he states tells the story of how he was once arrested for murder.

== Personal life ==
Adebayo is married to singer Carroll Thompson, and they have two daughters. He supports Charlton Athletic Football Club.

In October 1999, Adebayo was invited to Buckingham Palace to meet Queen Elizabeth II. Ten years later, he was appointed Member of the Order of the British Empire (MBE) in the Queen's Birthday Honours 2009.
