= Mani Djazmi =

- Born: 1980 (age 45–46); Tehran, Iran
- Occupation: Journalist

Mani Djazmi is a British-Iranian sports journalist and radio presenter best known for his broadcasting on the BBC. He is renowned for his interest in Middle Eastern football and he has interviewed high-profile sporting people such as Iranian footballing icon Ali Daei and Fulham F.C.'s owner American-Pakistani owner Shahid Khan.

Born in Tehran, Iran in 1980, he later moved to England at the age of four, initially on a short-term basis to undergo a sight-saving operation which was ultimately unsuccessful. As a result of his blindness, in 2004, he was allowed to become the first male journalist to be allowed into any kind of women's football in Iran.

He often broadcasts on the BBC World Service and covers football for the Middle East region. He is also the presenter of In Touch on BBC Radio 4.
