= Up All Night (radio show) =

BBC Radio 5 late night phone-in programme

- Genre: News
- Running time: Nightly 1 – 5 am
- Country of origin: United Kingdom
- Language: English
- Home station: BBC Radio 5 Live
- Starring: Dotun Adebayo (Monday - Thursday early mornings); Kathryn Stanczyszyn (Friday-Sunday early mornings)
- Recording studio: MediaCityUK, Salford, Greater Manchester, UK
- Original release: 28 March 1994 – Ongoing (On hiatus from 27 March to 6 July 2020)
- Audio format: FM, AM and Digital radio
- Website: Official website

Up All Night is a late night phone-in programme broadcast on the national news/sport station BBC Radio 5 Live in the United Kingdom, usually on air between 1 and 5 am every night. It is also broadcast on all of the BBC's local radio frequencies across England as well as on the BBC's Radio Scotland, Radio Wales, Radio Ulster and Radio Foyle.

The Washington Post once described the show, in its previous guise as a news and current affairs show, as probably the best night-time radio show in the world.

== History ==
Originally a news and current affairs show with occasional topical phone-ins, Up All Night was broadcast continuously from Radio 5 Live's launch on the 28 March 1994 until 27 March 2020. The show originally lasted three hours and was extended to four from 1998. One of the show's two main presenters, Rhod Sharp, had proposed the idea of an all-night radio show for the new station that made use of the BBC's correspondents from all over the world. He continued to present several shows each week (Monday to Wednesday) until March 2020, when he stepped down. Dotun Adebayo was the show's second main presenter, hosting the show from Friday night to Sunday night. Other presenters included Richard Dallyn, Dalya Raphael and Russell Fuller.

Up All Night used guest presenters regularly on Thursday nights (Friday mornings) from 3 November 2017. The first guest was Richard Foster, then Tom Green, and Rachael Bland.

Following the departure of Sharp in March 2020, coinciding with the COVID-19 lockdown, the programme was temporarily replaced by a nightly phone-in show from BBC Radio London, syndicated across BBC local radio stations. Adebayo moved to the weeknight slot and some popular features, such as the World Football Phone-In, were carried over.

On 6 July 2020, the programme returned to Five Live with a heavily revised format. Other than a short 10 to 15 minute interlude at the beginning of the show, it is almost entirely given over to the public phone-in format. Some features, such as the World Football Phone-In, have been carried over, but the regular updates on news stories around the world, including regular conversations with BBC overseas correspondents, have been largely abandoned.

=== Broadcast locations ===
Originally broadcast from studios at Broadcasting House, London and then from studios at Television Centre, the show's production, along with the rest of the BBC Radio 5 Live scheduled programmes, moved to MediaCityUK, Salford, Greater Manchester in 2012.

After 9/11, where he reported for BBC News, and while taking a sabbatical, Sharp and his wife fell in love with the fishing town of Marblehead, Massachusetts, in the United States. From 2004 to 2020, he presented the show (Monday to Wednesday) from the town. Initially using the studios and ISDN line of local radio station WESX; from 2007, he presented the show from a home studio within the couple's 18th-century house in Marblehead's Old Town section. Broadcasting from the United States made Sharp "pretty unique" among BBC radio hosts, according to former BBC deputy news director Stephen Mitchell.

== Features ==
The show had a heavy interest in the United States, partly due to the favourable time differences between North America and the UK, and often featured news and interviews from there. The Super Bowl was also broadcast in an extended programme for some years.

The programme launched a couple of Twitter pages and has a group on Facebook. Some elements of the show were available to download by podcast. Namely; Game On (under the Let's Talk About Tech thread), World Football Phone-In and Dr Karl.

=== Regular features ===
The programme gained a cult audience because of its off-beat approach to the news combined with various regular features. These included -

- Monday: The Phone-in, topics have included gardening, parenting and DIY.
- Tuesday: Game On, video game culture explored. This is the BBC's oldest games focused strand and has been produced in its current form since 2008.
- Wednesday: East Coast / West Coast: a regular look at US news and culture from either Los Angeles or New York.
- Thursday: Science questions to Dr Karl who joined the show from the Australian ABC network.
- Friday: The North American Sports Show, the first edition was broadcast in September 2018.
- Saturday: World Football Phone-In, with journalists Tim Vickery (South America), Mina Rzouki (Europe), Jon Arnold (Central and North America), Mark Meadows (Europe), Paul Sarahs (Europe), John Duerden (Asia) and Mark Gleeson (Africa) covering some of the world's football hotbeds.
- Sunday: The Virtual Jukebox, where callers suggested and then voted on a music track to be added to a growing list of tunes. A playlist is available on Spotify

For many years from the beginning of the programme the film critic, Dave Aldridge was a weekly contributor. In 2007 the programme pioneered a monthly live mental health phone-in with regular guest, Martin Seager, Consultant Clinical Psychologist and adult psychotherapist who headed an NHS psychological services department in the London area.

Another notable former contributor was Cash Peters, who reported from California on the latest US television news.
