= ESPN, LLC =

American sports media conglomerate

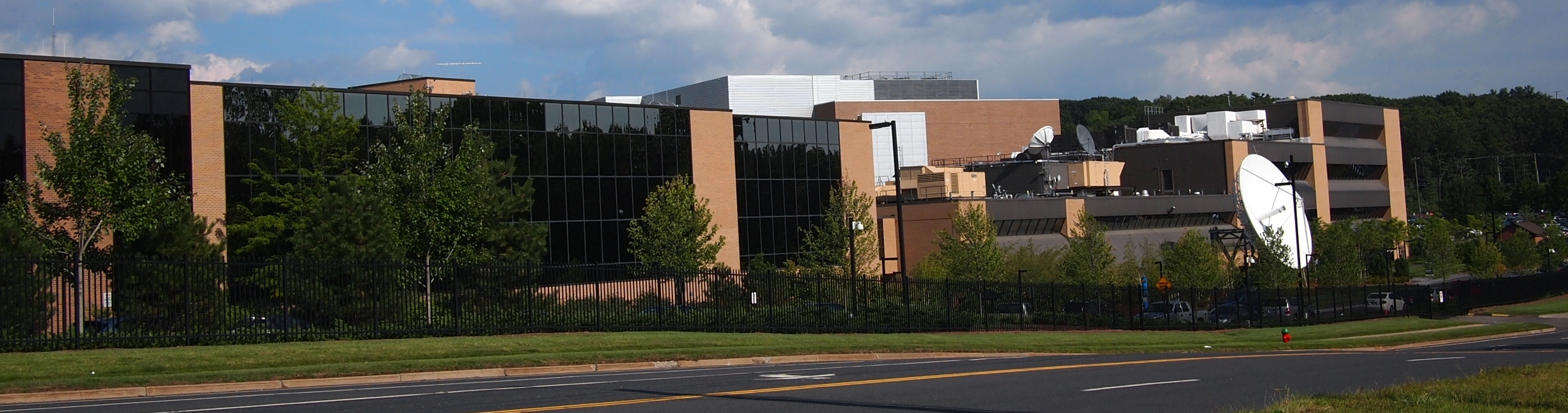
- ESPN's headquarters in Bristol, Connecticut.
- Formerly: ESPN, Inc.
- Type: Joint venture
- Industry: Sports broadcasting
- Founded: September 7, 1979; 47 years ago
- Founders: Bill and Scott Rasmussen and Ed Egan
- Headquarters: ESPN Plaza, 935 Middle Street, Bristol, Connecticut, United States
- Key people: James Pitaro (chairman)
- Owners: The Walt Disney Company (72%; via ABC Inc.); Hearst Communications (18%); National Football League (10%)
- Number of employees: 9,464 (2024)
- Subsidiaries: CTV Specialty Television (20%)
- Website: espn.com

ESPN, LLC, previously known as ESPN, Inc., is an American multinational sports media conglomerate founded by Bill Rasmussen on September 7, 1979 and currently majority-owned by the Walt Disney Company via indirect subsidiary ABC Inc. as one of its three major business segments, with Hearst Communications and the National Football League as equity stakeholders.

Currently headed by executive James Pitaro since March 5, 2018, it owns and operates the ESPN-branded cable television, satellite television and streaming media channels and services including ESPN itself, ESPN DTC, ESPN+, ESPN2, ESPNU, ESPNews, ESPN Deportes, ESPN Radio, ESPN.com, ACC Network, SEC Network, 20% of TSN and the sports division of ABC. It also operates the international variants of ESPN via ESPN International.

Programming on its television networks include broadcasts of live or tape-delayed sporting events and sports-related programming including talk shows and original documentary series and films.

== History ==
ESPN Inc. was founded by Bill Rasmussen, Scott Rasmussen, and Ed Egan initially as an attempt to broadcast sports in Connecticut over an "Entertainment and Sports Programming Network" (ESPN) cable channel, and soon became a nationwide cable sports network. Shortly after being terminated as the World Hockey Association's New England Whalers communications director in 1978, Rasmussen conceived of a plan to produce Connecticut sports events for Connecticut cable systems. With his son, Scott, they had moved beyond that, considering a national sports channel doable. RCA had an underused satellite and was pushing for customers. Finding it cheaper by the hour to rent a satellite transponder full-time, instead of 5 hours a day, the Rasmussens changed their plans from creating a Connecticut sports channel to creating a national cable network.

On February 7, 1979, Bill Rasmussen got the NCAA to agree, in principle, to grant ESPN broadcast rights for NCAA sports. The next day at the Texas Cable Show exposition, he was able to get cable companies on board. An advertising contract with Anheuser-Busch was in talks at that time, and Getty Oil came on board as its major source of capital. In 1979, Rasmussen purchased the first acre of land for ESPN's headquarters in Bristol, Connecticut. With a reasonable payment plan in July 1979, Rasmussen leased RCA's Satcom 1 transponder using his credit card. Anheuser-Busch became a major sponsor, signing a $1.4 million ad contract, a record at the time. Getty Oil invested $10 million into ESPN getting a controlling stake in 1979.

On September 7, 1979, the ESPN cable channel went on the air, with 24 hours of programming on the weekends and limited hours during the week. 625 cable system affiliates were signed up at launch and they had one million household subscribed total (out of 20 million households with cable). The channel's first game featured the Milwaukee Schlitz and the Kentucky Bourbons in the deciding game of the championship series of the American Professional Slo-Pitch League.

In 1980, the company was named in a Texas divorce filing. Groundbreaking for its headquarters took place one year earlier. Full-time broadcasting began in September 1980. Additional programming at the time included weekly boxing matches.

NBC Sports President Chet Simmons was hired to help run the cable channel. Simmons and Rasmussen were at odds with Getty Oil executives siding with Simmons. At the end of 1980, Rasmussen was removed as company president by Getty Oil executive for ESPN, Stuart Evey, relegating him to a ceremonial role. Rasmussen left in 1981 and sold his remaining stock in 1984.

Investing another $15 million into the company and no profits expected any time soon, Getty used management consultant McKinsey & Co. to assess ESPN's future. McKinsey's lead consultant was Roger Werner, who figured with another $120 million and five years ESPN would become a profit maker. Werner soon was hired by ESPN as vice-president of finance, administration, and planning and developed a new business plan. Werner developed a new revenue source beyond advertising by initiating revolutionary affiliate fees paid by the cable operators by number of subscribers starting at 6 cents. Between CBS Cable folding in October 1982 and the new CEO, Bill Grimes, they convinced most of the reluctant cable providers to pay. By 1985, the fee was 10 cents.

ESPN was the largest cable channel by the end of 1983 with 28.5 million households. Also in 1983, the company began distributing programming outside the United States. In 1984, the American television network ABC purchased a controlling stake in the company. ABC later merged with Capital Cities Communications, and the combined company was purchased by The Walt Disney Company in 1996. In 1988, Roger Werner became the network's president and CEO.

ESPN started out expanding into other nations and additional channels. The ESPN International unit was formed in 1988 to start channels in other nations beginning with ESPN Latin America in 1989. In 1992, ESPN Asia was launched. ESPN partnered with TF1 and Canal+ for a made over Eurosport to enter Europe.

RJR Nabisco sold its 20% stake in ESPN to the Hearst Corporation. Werner resigned as CEO and president in October 1990 for another sports CEO job. Steve Bornstein replaced him in the CEO post moving up from the second position of executive vice-president in charge of programming and production.

With ABC Radio Network, the company started the ESPN Radio Network in 1991 with programming 16 hours per week. Ohlmeyer Communications' sports programming division was purchased in March 1993. ESPN launched ESPN2 on October 1, 1993 at 7:30 PM. The channel at the time was targeting those age 18-34. In 1994, ESPN acquired Creative Sports and from Dow Jones an 80% stake in SportsTicker.

In 1997, ESPN acquired the Classic Sports Network. In 2006, ESPN acquired the North American Sports Network (NASN). It was re-branded as ESPN America on February 1, 2009.

In February 2016, ESPN and Tencent reached an agreement of collaboration. ESPN's content would be localized and exclusively distributed and promoted by Tencent's digital platforms in China, including college basketball games, the X Games and an ESPN section on QQ.com. In August 2016, Disney purchased a 1/3 stake in BAMTech for $1 billion from MLB Advanced Media with the option to purchase a majority share, which it later exercised, and now owns 85%. Disney purchased the stake to first develop an ESPN-branded subscription streaming service, later named ESPN+.

In July 2023, it was reported that Disney was contemplating selling an equity stake in ESPN to an outside partner, as part of a future expansion of its streaming business to include ESPN's linear networks.

On August 8, 2023, Penn Entertainment announced a $2 billion agreement with ESPN to rebrand its Barstool Sportsbook sports betting services as ESPN Bet. As part of the agreement, ESPN will receive $1.5 billion in cash over 10 years, and will take $500 million in Penn stock.

On February 6, 2024, ESPN announced a joint venture with Fox Corporation and Warner Bros. Discovery to launch a sports streaming service called Venu Sports, offering the three organizations' main linear sports channels and associated media rights, beginning in late-2024. However, after being met with antitrust lawsuits, the venture was folded in January 2025. In May 2025 during Disney's upfronts, ESPN announced a major realignment of its streaming business, which would see the launch of a flagship ESPN OTT service in late-2025; the service will offer all of ESPN's linear television and authenticated streaming content on a direct-to-consumer basis for the first time, as well as content previously distributed under the ESPN+ service.

On August 5, 2025, ESPN Inc. announced that it had reached an agreement to acquire the National Football League's NFL Media division. Under the agreement, ESPN would acquire NFL Network, television distribution rights to NFL RedZone and the RedZone brand, and the league's official fantasy football service. The NFL would take a 10% equity stake in ESPN, NFL Network would become part of the forthcoming ESPN streaming service, the NFL would license content from NFL Films to air on ESPN networks, and ESPN will reassign selected games from its NFL broadcast package to NFL Network's exclusive game package. The NFL would continue to produce RedZone for ESPN, and the acquisition excludes properties such as NFL Films, NFL.com, and NFL+. Pending regulatory approval, the transaction is expected to be completed at some point in 2026, with some sources projecting that it could be completed prior to the 2026 season.

On January 31, 2026, government regulators approved the deal, with the agreement closing shortly thereafter. NFL employees were announced to officially become ESPN employees in April.

In April 2026, ESPN premiered a documentary, "Sports Heaven: The Birth of ESPN", chronicling the channel's creation. This documentary tells the story of how Bill and Scott Rasmussen launched the network.

Its founder, Bill Rasmussen, died on August 18, 2026, at the age of 93, at his home in Florida, from complications of Parkinson's disease.

== Executives ==
- James Pitaro – Chairman
  - Judy Agay – Executive Vice President, People & Culture
  - Chara-Lynn Aguiar – Executive Vice President, Chief Financial Officer, Research, Strategy and Office of the Chairman
  - Tony Chambers – President, EMEA
  - Eleanor "Nell" DeVane – General Counsel
  - Rosalyn Durant – Executive Vice President, Programming & Acquisitions
    - John Lasker – Senior Vice President, ESPN+
  - Rita Ferro – President, Global Advertising
  - Martín Iraola – President, The Walt Disney Company Latin America
  - Luke Kang – President, Asia Pacific
  - Josh Krulewitz – Executive Vice President, Communications
  - Burke Magnus – President, Content
    - Chris Calcinari – Senior Vice President, Content Operations
    - Kaitee Daley – Senior Vice President, Digital, Social and Streaming Content
    - Mike Foss – Executive Vice President, Executive Editor, Sports News and Entertainment
    - Brian Lockhart – Senior Vice President, Original Content
    - Mike McQuade – Executive Vice President, Sports Production
    - Nick Parsons – Vice President, Content Business Operations
    - Freddy Rolón – Head of Global Sports & Talent Office
  - Tina Thornton – Executive Vice President, Creative Studio and Marketing
  - Jimmy Zasowski – President, Platform Distribution

== Assets ==
=== Television ===
- ABC (2006–present)
- ACC Network (2019–present)
- ESPN (1979–present)
- ESPN2 (1993–present)
- ESPNews (1996–present)
- ESPNU (2005–present)
- ESPN Deportes (2004–present)
- ESPN Events (1996–present), also called ESPN Regional Television
- ESPN Films (2001–present)
- ESPN International (1989–present)
- ESPN PPV (1999–present)
- SEC Network (2014–present)
- ESPN8 (2023–present as a standalone channel)
- NFL Network (2026–present)
- NFL RedZone (2026–present)

==== Canada ====
Under the Canadian Radio-television and Telecommunications Commission's rules regarding foreign broadcasters, ESPN has been prohibited from acquiring majority ownership of any channel operating in Canada. Instead, ESPN partnered with several Canadian firms to form a privately held consortium named NetStar Communications in 1995, which then acquired the sports networks TSN and RDS. These Canadian partners then sold their shares in 2001 to CTV Inc. (now Bell Media). ESPN continues to own 20 percent of what is now CTV Specialty Television while Bell Media owns the remaining 80 percent.

The sports channels owned by the CTV Specialty Television subsidiary:

- TSN – five feeds
- RDS
- RDS2
- RDS Info

Through CTV Specialty Television, ESPN also has an indirect interest in several channels operated in partnership with Warner Bros. Discovery, but ESPN is not believed to be directly involved with these operations. Those channels were rebranded and replaced in 2025 with the transfer of the Warner Bros. Discovery brands to Rogers Sports & Media.

=== Radio ===
- ESPN Radio (1992–present)
- ESPN Xtra (2008–present)

=== Internet ===
- ESPN.com (1993–present), flagship site
- ESPN3 (2005–present), known as ESPN360.com from 2005–2010
- ESPN Motion (2003–present), broadband video
- ESPN+ (2018–present), subscription streaming service available in the United States
- ESPN on Disney+ (2023–present), available in the United States, Latin America, Australia, New Zealand and South Africa
- ESPN DTC (2025–present)
- Andscape (2016–present), formerly The Undefeated, describes itself as "the premier platform for exploring the intersections of race, sports and culture.
- espnW.com, focusing on women
- ESPN.mobi, mobile site
- ESPN Deportes.com (2000–present), Spanish language
- ESPN FC (1995–present), soccer, formerly ESPN Soccernet
- ESPNF1.com, Formula 1
- Cricinfo (1993–present), cricket
- ESPNScrum.com, rugby union
- EXPN.com, extreme sports
- ESPNBoston.com, operates in conjunction with Entercom-owned WEEI AM
- ESPNChicago.com, the site for Good Karma Brands-owned (former ESPN O&O) WMVP
- ESPNCleveland.com, joint site for GKB-owned WKNR and WWGK
- ESPNDallas.com
- ESPNLosAngeles.com
- ESPNNewYork.com, joint site for Audacy-owned (and GKB-managed) WHSQ and GKB-owned (former ESPN O&O) WEPN (AM)
- ESPNWisconsin.com, joint site for GKB-owned WKTI-FM/Milwaukee and WTLX/Monona-Madison

=== Other ===
- ESPY Awards (1993–present)
- The ESPN Sports Poll (1994–present)
- ESPN Broadband (2002–present)
- ESPN Books (2004–present)
- ESPNU.com (2005–present)
- ESPN Deportes La Revista (2005–present)
- ESPN Integration (2006–present)
- ESPN Online Games (2006–present)
- ESPN Wide World of Sports Complex (2010–present)
- College football bowl games, owned by ESPN Events
- Premier Lacrosse League (minority stake)
- XFL Properties, LLC (minority stake, 2022–present)

=== Divested ===
- X Games (1995–2022)
- DraftKings (2019–2023), minority investment

=== Defunct ===
- ESPN College Extra (2015–2023)
- ESPN Classic (1997–2021)
- ESPN Classic (Canada) (2001–2023)
- ESPN Deportes Radio (2005–2019)
- ESPN Digital Games (1998), short-lived joint venture with Radical Entertainment
- ESPN Goal Line & Bases Loaded (2010–2020)
- ESPN Player (until 2023), subscription streaming service available in select international markets
- ESPNU Radio (2017–2023)
- ESPN Videogames (2003–2005), joint venture with Sega
- Longhorn Network (2011–2024, joint venture with The University of Texas at Austin and IMG College)
- WatchESPN (2011–2019), known as ESPN Networks from 2010–2011
- ESPN The Games (1999–2002), joint venture with Konami and Disney Interactive
- ESPN The Magazine (1998–2019)
- Screensport (1984–1993), joint venture with WHSmith

=== United Kingdom ===
ESPN entered the United Kingdom in 2006 when pan-European ESPN Classic was added to Sky Digital.

In December 2006, the North American Sports Network, which operated as a joint-venture between Benchmark Capital Europe and Setanta Sports announced the sale of the channel to ESPN for €70 million. The sale's closure in March 2007 added NASN to the ESPN family, although it remained as part of the Setanta Sports Pack on satellite television. On October 2, 2008, it was announced that NASN would rebrand as ESPN America. The rebranding took place on February 1, 2009, to coincide with Super Bowl XLIII.

On June 19, 2009 it was announced that Setanta Sports UK had lost their local rights package to half of the UK Premier League matches, with ESPN as one of the interested parties to acquire the rights. On June 22, 2009, a day before Setanta UK collapsed into administration, ESPN announced they had snapped up the rights from the 2009–10 season to the 2012–13 season, and would launch their own domestic channel. ESPN UK launched in August 2009, forming as part of a new TV package with America and Classic, by acquiring much of the ex-Setanta slots.

By 2012, the network had begun to lose many of its key sports rights, including the Premier League, to BT Group. On January 25, 2013, ESPN reached a deal to sell its television business in the United Kingdom and Ireland, including ESPN America's programming rights, to BT Group. The ESPN channel in the United Kingdom was placed under the control of BT Sport, while ESPN Classic and ESPN America shut down. ESPN continues to operate digital properties targeting the United Kingdom, including its ESPN.co.uk, ESPN FC, Cricinfo, and ESPNscrum websites. Two years later, ESPN reached a long-term deal with BT Sport for the British rights to ESPN original programming and international event rights.

The main ESPN network following the BT purchase transitioned to airing North American Sports programming, and in June 2015 was renamed BT Sport ESPN. On May 11, 2022, BT announced that the BT Sport networks would form as part of a new joint venture with Disney rival Warner Bros. Discovery and to merge with their existing Eurosport networks at a later date. Due to this, ESPN decided not to renew their name licensing deal with BT, and on 1 August 2022, the channel was renamed BT Sport 4, although it continues to mainly focus on North American sports.

== See also ==
- A+E Global Media, formerly co-owned by Disney and Hearst
- Disney Entertainment Television
