= ESPN3 =

American online streaming service

- Country: United States
- Broadcast area: Nationwide
- Headquarters: ESPN Plaza, 935 Middle Street, Bristol, Connecticut

Programming
- Language: English

Ownership
- Owner: The Walt Disney Company (80%); Hearst Communications (20%)
- Parent: ESPN
- Sister channels: ABC; ESPN; ESPN+; ESPN2; ESPNews; ESPNU; ESPN Deportes; Longhorn Network (closed); SEC Network; SEC Network+; ACC Network; ACC Network Extra

History
- Launched: 2005; 21 years ago
- Closed: December 2, 2025; 11 months ago
- Replaced by: ESPN (streaming service)
- Former names: ESPN360.com (2005–2010); ESPN3.com (2010–2011)

ESPN3 (formerly ESPN360 and ESPN3.com) was an online streaming service owned by ESPN, a joint venture between the Walt Disney Company (which operated the network, through its 80% controlling ownership interest) and Hearst Communications (which held the remaining 20% interest). It provided live streams and replays of global sports events to sports fans in the United States.

The service quietly closed December 2, 2025, after its content was merged into ESPN's self-titled streaming service in full.

== History ==
The use of the name ESPN3 was discussed as early as 1996, for the channel that would eventually become known as ESPNews. The website began in 2005 as ESPN360.com, a mostly on-demand video website. In September 2007, ESPN360.com began replacing its on-demand content, such as studio shows, with live sports coverage and shifted towards a "emphasis on live events". In December 2008, ESPN360.com began airing commercials featuring pitchman Billy Mays.

On April 4, 2010, ESPN360.com relaunched as ESPN3.com. On August 31, 2011, the service became known as simply ESPN3, and was incorporated into the WatchESPN app (which carries simulcasts of ESPN, ESPN2, ESPNU, ESPNews, ESPN Deportes, ESPN Goal Line, ESPN Buzzer Beater, SEC Network and Longhorn Network for cable subscribers).

In April 2018, a new subscription over-the-top content service called ESPN+ launched. ESPN+ is a separate service which does not include content from ESPN3 or ESPN's linear channels. A substantial number of programs that had previously been available on ESPN3 moved to ESPN+. This received criticism online since such content were effectively paywalled behind a separate subscription.

ESPN3 and ESPN+ were effectively integrated with the August 2025 launch of the new ESPN DTC service; in December 2025, ESPN quietly discontinued ESPN3.

== Description ==
At the time of its closure, ESPN3 broadcast most of ABC's sports programming as well as alternate camera angles of programming airing in simulcast on one of the linear networks (similar to ESPN Megacast), panorama coverage of multiple courts (in the case of bracket tournaments, especially for major tennis tournaments), Spanish dubs not carried on ESPN Deportes, and a limited amount of exclusive college sports programming, mostly from smaller colleges and universities.

In contrast to WatchESPN and other TV Everywhere services, access to ESPN3 from computers was automatically determined by assessing the incoming IP address without the need for a direct login. Those accessing from outside their usual network or from a mobile device had to use their TV Everywhere login to access ESPN3 content.

== Availability ==
In the United States, ESPN3 was originally available to individuals who receive their high-speed internet connection or cable television subscription from an affiliated service provider that paid fees to ESPN. By 2008, ESPN3 was available free of charge to approximately 21 million U.S. college students and U.S.-based military personnel via computers with college/university (.edu) and U.S. military (.mil) IP addresses. ESPN3 was not carried by traditional cable and satellite providers, as it was not a single channel, but streamed multiple live events at the same time; however, ESPN included a listing for a linear "ESPN3" channel (which only included one event at a time) in the television listings on its website. As part of the wide-ranging distribution agreement that DirecTV and The Walt Disney Company announced, ESPN3 became available to DirecTV customers in early 2015. In December 2016, ESPN started the nationwide rollout of the ESPN App on DirecTV set top boxes in five states, which allowed customers to stream thousands of live events from ESPN3 on their DirecTV set top boxes. The nationwide rollout was completed in February 2017.

On November 1, 2010, ESPN3 launched on Xbox Live. This service allowed Xbox Live members to access live sporting events on ESPN3, among other offerings, at no additional cost. At launch, Xbox Live Gold membership was required to access the ESPN app until a software update in June 2014. Dish Network added ESPN3 in April 2014. In September 2016, ESPN3 became available on over-the-top online video service Sling TV.

== Criticism ==
Some internet service providers complained to the FCC that ESPN3, in its original ISP-centric implementation, violated the principles of network neutrality. In this system, ESPN3 bundled its content into the fees of the participating ISP, regardless of whether or not users partake in accessing its content. On the other hand, there was the possibility that in some areas, viewers interested in ESPN3 content might not have any ESPN3-participating ISP available to use.
