= Venu Sports =

Scrapped American ESPN/Fox/TNT sports bundle

- Company type: Joint venture
- Website type: OTT video streaming platform
- Area served: United States
- Owners: ESPN Inc. (33.33%) (Disney: 80%, Hearst: 20%); Fox Corporation (33.33%); Warner Bros. Discovery (33.33%)
- CEO: Pete Distad
- Website: Archived official website at the Wayback Machine (archive index)
- Current status: Canceled

Venu Sports, or simply Venu (/ˈvɛnju/), is a scrapped sports-focused streaming service in the United States, to be operated as a joint venture between ESPN Inc. (a joint venture between the Walt Disney Company and Hearst Communications), Fox Corporation (through the Fox Sports Media Group), and Warner Bros. Discovery (owner of TNT Sports). Announced on February 6, 2024, it was originally scheduled to launch by the summer or fall of 2024, with each of the three partners owning one-third of the venture, subject to the negotiation of final contracts between them. On January 10, 2025, the companies announced Venu would not launch.

Venu sought to bundle the majority of U.S. national sports broadcast rights controlled by the three companies in a single subscription, with limited entertainment and news content. The service would have been available as a standalone product, or sold as part of a bundle with one of the companies' other streaming platforms like Disney+, Hulu, or Max.

The joint venture partners said Venu would have been specifically targeted to cord-cutters and cord-nevers who were not active subscribers to either a traditional cable or satellite TV package, or an existing mainstream virtual MVPD such as FuboTV, YouTube TV, or Disney's Hulu + Live TV package.

On August 16, 2024, a federal judge granted a preliminary injunction to block the venture's launch after FuboTV filed an antitrust lawsuit against the partners. The lawsuit was settled in January 2025 as part of a planned merger of FuboTV with the Hulu + Live TV business, with Disney earning a 70% stake of the combined company. However, DirecTV and Dish Network asked the court to reconsider the case, and later that month Disney, Fox and Warner Bros. Discovery decided to discontinue the Venu joint venture.

== Content ==
The service was expected to function similarly to a virtual MVPD in that it would carry almost all of the three companies' English-language U.S. linear broadcast and cable channels that offer sports content, including local stations and affiliates of the ABC and Fox broadcast networks (subject to the participation of the affiliates' owners); general sports channels ESPN, ESPN2, ESPNews, FS1, and FS2; college sports channels ACC Network, Big Ten Network, ESPNU, and SEC Network; and the three primary WBD cable networks that carry sports coverage: TBS, TNT, and TruTV. It would have also included access to the content of Disney's existing direct-to-consumer sports service ESPN+. The streaming service was planned to provide access to the same sports events that were currently offered by the above-listed services, which as of February 2024 would have included the majority of national broadcasting rights to NBA, NHL, and MLB games, the College Football Playoff and almost all NCAA-organized championships, as well as select NFL games, among many other properties. However, the service would not have provided access to sports events controlled by regional sports networks (RSNs), third-party streaming services such as Prime Video and Apple TV+, and other major traditional broadcasters, particularly Paramount Global (owner of CBS and Paramount+) and NBCUniversal, a subsidiary of Comcast (owner of NBC and Peacock). Moreover, Paramount and Comcast were not invited to participate in the venture.

The companies have stated that all programming would be offered on a non-exclusive basis, as the channels and content would continue to be made available through existing television providers and/or the companies' respective standalone services. In March 2024, an executive with Nexstar Media Group said independent broadcasters who own ABC and Fox network affiliates will be paid for distribution of their channels on the platform, which will be on an "opt-in" basis, suggesting some parts of the country might not have access to their ABC and/or Fox affiliate at launch.

While subscribers would be able to watch any entertainment and news programming that regularly airs on these channels in addition to sports, the service would not carry other channels owned by these companies that are typically included in cable bundles, such as CNN or Fox News. However, in situations where sports broadcasts are carried by the companies' other channels, those channels may be carried temporarily as "pop-up channels", using a concept that is common in Europe but relatively rare in the United States.

== Branding ==
The initial announcement indicated the service would have a "new brand", though that brand was not identified immediately. Within the three companies, the project was initially known by the internal code name "Raptor".

In the absence of an announced name, several media analysts and news reports used the shorthand names "Hulu for Sports" and "Spulu", both alluding to general entertainment streaming service Hulu and its original joint venture ownership structure. At one point, the partners were reportedly considering making "Hulu Sports" the official name of the service, which would brand the service as an extension of Hulu (now controlled by Disney) despite having separate management.

On May 16, 2024, the service's branding was announced as Venu Sports, or simply Venu. "Venu" is pronounced like "venue" (as in a sports venue).

== Distribution ==
Venu was to be available individually through a new bespoke app, or as part of a bundle with Disney+, Hulu, and/or Max. In May 2024, Disney and WBD separately announced plans to launch a bundle of the three latter services, but did not specifically address the possibility of a four-way bundle with Venu.

Early reports indicated that the regular price per month would be higher than US$30, and likely at least $45, slotting it between the prices of some standalone regional sports streaming services like NESN 360 (in the $20-$30 range) and larger cable-style vMVPD packages like YouTube TV (which start at around $75). On August 1, 2024, the launch price was announced as being $42.99 per month; this price would be guaranteed for twelve months from the start of a subscription, with no long term commitment required.

== Management and staff ==
The service was to be overseen by a separate management team at arms-length from the three partners. On March 15, 2024, the partners announced that former Apple and Hulu executive Pete Distad would serve as the service's first CEO. Additional executives were announced in June 2024, at which point Venu said there were already 150 executives and software engineers working on the product, the majority of those being Fox employees expected to move to the joint venture once finalized. A placeholder website for the service had likewise been launched in May under Fox ownership, through a subsidiary named Rookie Enterprises LLC.

== Regulatory and legal concerns ==
Following the initial announcement, the three companies involved stated that the formation of the joint venture would not affect their respective plans to compete with each other for sports broadcast rights going forward, nor would the joint-venture service seek any exclusive rights of its own. Because of this, as well as the statement that all content will continue to be available through other platforms, many analysts initially indicated they did not expect the formation of the venture to raise antitrust concerns.

Nonetheless, shortly after the announcement, traditional cable and satellite providers were reportedly reviewing the plans as to whether they may violate most favored nation clauses in existing contracts, unless the providers are allowed to also start offering lower-priced sports-focused packages. Analysts noted that some of these providers had been "begging for the right" to offer cheaper sports packages for years, but were blocked by programmers like Disney, Fox, and WBD, which had insisted that their sports channels be bundled with their other news and entertainment channels.

The NFL was not informed about the service in advance of the February 2024 announcement, and shortly thereafter, media outlets reported the league was investigating whether it could block the service from carrying its games.

The existing sports-focused vMVPD FuboTV also expressed concerns following the announcement about the venture's impact on "fair market competition". On February 20, FuboTV filed an antitrust lawsuit in the U.S. District Court for the Southern District of New York, seeking either to block the venture entirely, or for the court to alternatively impose economic and licensing restrictions. Satellite TV providers DirecTV and Dish Network both filed briefs in support of Fubo's suit in April. A subsequent letter to congressional leaders requesting hearings into the service was co-signed by all three providers as well as groups including the Electronic Frontier Foundation.

The United States Department of Justice also stated that it plans to review the terms of the joint venture once it is finalized. Separately, Rep. Jerry Nadler, the ranking member of the United States House Committee on the Judiciary, and Rep. Joaquin Castro submitted a letter to Disney, Fox, and WBD on April 16 seeking answers on the impact the new service would have on competition and pricing. The owners were given two weeks from the letter's date to respond. After receiving the owners' replies, Nadler and Castro sent a second letter on June 7, stating that these answers were "insufficient" regarding concerns about preventing collusion, ensuring consumer privacy, and methods to determine the service's pricing.

On August 16, 2024, federal judge Margaret Garnett granted a preliminary injunction against Venu, blocking its launch while the FuboTV antitrust lawsuit continues, stating that the vMVPD is likely to succeed in proving its case that the venture will "substantially lessen competition and restrain trade".

On January 6, 2025, Fubo announced it would merge with Disney's Hulu + Live TV vMVPD business, resulting in Disney receiving a 70% stake in the combined company, and that it had settled its litigation with Disney, WBD and Fox related to Venu. However, DirecTV and Dish Network asked Judge Garnett to reconsider dismissing the case, stating that the antitrust issues remained unanswered and that they could still be harmed by Venu's competition. On January 10, Disney, WBD and Fox announced that Venu would not launch, saying, "After careful consideration, we have collectively agreed to discontinue the Venu Sports joint venture and not launch the streaming service."

Disney said the following month that it had determined Venu would be "redundant" following the announcement of other skinny sports bundles from DirecTV, Comcast, and Fubo, and that it would instead focus on its planned "flagship" standalone streaming service, which it officially announced in May of that year. Around the same time, Fox announced it would soon launch a direct-to-consumer streaming offering which would include Fox Sports content, later announced as Fox One. For its part, WBD announced that it would continue to bundle TNT Sports content into Max's ad-free tiers, abandoning plans to move its sports offerings into an add-on subscription. ESPN would also announce its "flagship" DTC service that launched in August 2025, the ESPN DTC also offers a bundle with the aforementioned Fox One.
