= ESPN (streaming service) =

Sports streaming service

- Promotional image for the service
- Website type: OTT sports streaming service
- Headquarters: ESPN Plaza, 935 Middle Street, Bristol, Connecticut, United States
- Area served: United States
- Owner: ESPN
- Services: ESPN Select and ESPN Unlimited
- Website: stream.espn.com
- Registration: Subscription required for streaming content
- Launched: August 21, 2025; 14 months ago
- Current status: Active

ESPN, also known as ESPN DTC or "the ESPN app", is an American over-the-top sports video streaming service operated by ESPN, LLC. Launched on August 21, 2025, it succeeds multiple previous streaming services operated by the company, offering live programming from ESPN's flagship linear cable television networks, as well as streaming-exclusive events and programming. The service is accessible via ESPN's website and apps, as well as a hub on Disney+ for subscribers to both services.

The service is sold in two tiers: the Select tier replaced ESPN+ for residential customers and carries the content which was previously exclusive to that service. The Unlimited tier adds programming from ESPN's main cable networks (such as ESPN, ESPN2, NFL Network, SEC Network, ACC Network, ESPNU, and ESPN Deportes), ESPN on ABC and CW Sports broadcasts, and content from ESPN's supplemental streaming brands (such as SEC Network+ and ACC Network Extra, and content that was previously distributed under the ESPN3 brand). ESPN Unlimited also carries WWE professional wrestling events, including main roster and NXT live events, as well as the weekly WWE NXT television series.

Initially developed under the code name "Flagship", the service made the programming of ESPN's main cable television networks—previously accessible only through subscription television packages offered via cable, satellite, IPTV, and virtual MVPDs—available directly to consumers for the first time. Subscribers to ESPN's networks via television providers are able to access ESPN Unlimited via TV Everywhere authentication, although it was not available to all major providers at launch due to carriage negotiations.

== History ==
Disney launched the ESPN+ streaming service in April 2018; due to the company's agreements with cable companies and other service providers, the service could not include access to ESPN's cable channels, and instead primarily offered sports content not available on those channels.

In May 2023, The Wall Street Journal reported that ESPN was working on a project, internally code named "Flagship", to offer its namesake cable channel directly to consumers outside of the cable bundle. As part of this project, ESPN was reported to be in negotiations with cable providers and sports leagues to give it the flexibility to launch such a service. In September 2023, as part of its settlement of a major carriage dispute with Disney, Charter Communications received the right to distribute the planned service as part of its existing packages on launch. On February 7, 2024, Disney chief executive Bob Iger announced during an earnings call that the service would launch in late August or fall 2025. In September 2024, following its own carriage dispute with Disney, DirecTV secured similar distribution rights for the service.

Prior to the announcement of the service's name as simply "ESPN", Disney and ESPN press releases referred to the project as the "ESPN flagship direct-to-consumer service". Most external trade media had referred to the service as "ESPN Flagship" or simply "Flagship". In March 2025, a Disney executive was reported to have referred to the service as "ESPN All Access" at an industry conference, though no official announcement was made at that time. In May 2025, CNBC reported via internal sources that the service may be branded as simply "ESPN" with no disambiguation, to signify the service as being the network's core offering for both over the top and subscription television customers, and to reduce market confusion by not using commonly-used suffixes such as "Plus". This plan was confirmed by Disney a few days later; at launch, the service was promoted with the slogan "All of ESPN. All in One Place", and as part of "the all new ESPN app".

On August 6, 2025, ESPN announced that the service would launch on August 21; the launch would coincide with a stretch of ESPN-televised events, most notably the start of college football season, and the US Open. With ESPN's then-pending acquisition of NFL Media, the service would carry additional NFL content (including interactive features and a package of out-of-market preseason games) on launch, ESPN would have the ability to offer bundles of the service with NFL+, and NFL Network was to be added to the service in the future. A post-launch marketing campaign—"Always in Season"—debuted in December 2025 alongside the College Football Playoff first round, aiming to emphasize ESPN's year-round offering of sports content; the campaign includes a collaboration with Best Buy to extensively promote the service at its stores.

== Content ==
The service is available in two tiers, "Select" and "Unlimited". The lower-priced Select plan replaces the previous ESPN+ service, which primarily carries events or coverage not available on ESPN's linear channels. Existing ESPN+ subscribers were converted to this plan automatically, though the ESPN+ brand remained active for an unspecified period of time due to contractual obligations. The tier includes access to content such as exclusive National Hockey League games, and all out-of-market regional games (NHL Power Play on ESPN+).

The higher-priced "Unlimited" plan, in addition to ESPN+ content, includes all of ESPN's existing U.S. linear cable channels (flagship ESPN channel, ESPN2, ESPNU, ESPNews, ESPN Deportes, ACC Network, and SEC Network), as well as ESPN on ABC programming. The service also carries streaming-only content previously only available through TV provider authentication under the ESPN3, ACC Network Extra (ACCNX), and SEC Network+ brands. Some content previously carried by ESPN+ was moved to the "Unlimited" tier; for example during the 2026 Australian Open, the "Select" tier only carried coverage of outer court matches, with all show court matches becoming exclusive to the "Unlimited" tier.

The ESPN apps were updated alongside the service's launch to include new features for subscribers, such as "SportsCenter For You"—a beta feature allowing users to create customized feeds of sports highlights narrated using AI voices based on SportsCenter anchors, multiview support, the ability to view real-time statistics and updates from ESPN fantasy games and the ESPN Bet sportsbook (with a goal to allow live betting from within the app in the future), and the second screen feature "StreamCenter". ESPN partnered with Fanatics to integrate online shopping features for sports-related products. Some reports have suggested the service will eventually include the ability to host user-generated content. By contrast, in the lead-up to the service's launch, ESPN.com began to quietly discontinue an ESPN+ paywall it had established for certain original content and premium analysis (a practice dating back to the former "ESPN Insider" service, which was folded into ESPN+ in 2018).

On August 6, 2025, the American professional wrestling promotion WWE announced a five-year agreement with ESPN, in which its pay-per-view and livestreaming events (referred to as Premium Live Events, or PLEs) would move to ESPN Unlimited. ESPN would also be able to broadcast studio programming from WWE events (including dedicated pre- and post-event shows, and existing studio programs such as SportsCenter), and carry selected PLEs on ESPN cable networks. The deal succeeded one between WWE and NBCUniversal's streaming service Peacock; the agreement did not cover digital rights to WWE's library content or NXT's PLEs, although ESPN president James Pitaro expressed interest in the library rights if they became available. While originally announced as beginning with WrestleMania 42 in April 2026, the agreement was later moved up to begin in September 2025 with Wrestlepalooza; the Peacock contract was based on a quota of PLEs and not necessarily a period of time, and had been fulfilled by additional PLEs (such as every WrestleMania on Peacock since 2021 being two nights, the all-women's event Evolution in July 2025, and SummerSlam in August 2025 expanding to two nights).

On November 19, 2025, it was announced that MLB.tv would move exclusively to the ESPN app beginning in the 2026 Major League Baseball season. The changes apply primarily to new customers, who must subscribe to the service via ESPN platforms, and must opt-into a one-month free trial of ESPN Unlimited as part of the checkout process (although the user does not have to maintain the subscription in order to continue using MLB.tv). Existing subscriptions billed via MLB platforms and T-Mobile can also be linked into the ESPN app, and ESPN Unlimited subscribers are eligible to receive a discount on MLB.tv.; The Athletic reported in January 2026 that the changes would initially apply to MLB.tv's out-of-market services, and that its in-market regional packages were not expected to move until 2027.

On April 29, 2026, ESPN announced a sublicensing agreement with The CW, under which its sports and sports entertainment programming would become available on the ESPN app for Unlimited subscribers beginning August 4; this most notably includes packages of ACC, Mountain West, and Pac-12 college athletics beginning in the 2026–27 season, all NASCAR O'Reilly Auto Parts Series races, and PBA Tour bowling among other properties. This agreement also includes rights to The CW's WWE programming, encompassing the weekly WWE NXT television series, and NXT special events. NFL Network was added to ESPN Unlimited on July 30, 2026.

== Distribution ==
Disney has said that all content will be available through both ESPN's own existing app, as well as the ESPN hub on the Disney+ app for those also subscribed to that service. In February 2025, CNBC reported the most likely price would be either $25 or $30 per month. Disney later confirmed the $29.99 monthly price for the unlimited tier—though with an introductory offer to bundle the ad-supported versions of Disney+ and Hulu at no additional charge for 12 months—while the select tier would retain ESPN+'s pricing of $11.99 per month. On August 11, 2025, ESPN and Fox Corporation announced that it would offer a bundle of the ESPN service with the then-upcoming Fox One priced at $39.99 per month.

In May 2025, Bob Iger said that all subscribers to the ESPN linear channels would "automatically" get access to ESPN Unlimited. The company later clarified that various enhancements being introduced alongside the streaming product would be added to ESPN's apps at no extra charge for existing television subscribers, but that the enhanced service will not be available to all providers at launch.

Disney had already negotiated with Charter Communications and DirecTV to include the then-rumored service as part of their carriage agreements with ESPN. In late-October 2025, Disney renewed its carriage agreements with Comcast to allow access to ESPN Unlimited for Xfinity subscribers, taking effect in February 2026. Cox Communications added ESPN Unlimited in January 2026. In November 2025, YouTube TV reached an agreement to carry ESPN Unlimited in the future, along with the ability to aggregate ESPN's digital content directly into the YouTube TV platform. ESPN Unlimited became available to YouTube TV subscribers via authentication in late-July 2026 prior to SummerSlam, while integration of ESPN DTC content into YouTube TV launched in September 2026. As of August 2026, notable holdouts still included Dish Network and its virtual MVPD subsidiary Sling TV, and Optimum.

== See also ==
- Venu Sports, a scrapped joint venture DTC sports service from ESPN, Fox and Warner Bros. Discovery
