= WatchESPN =

ESPN streaming media outlet

- Website type: Sports broadcasting
- Owner: ESPN Inc.
- Revenue: unknown
- Website: www.espn.com/watch/
- Launched: October 25, 2010; 16 years ago
- Current status: Defunct

ESPN began offering a TV Everywhere platform in 2010, allowing subscribers on participating television providers in the United States to stream programming from ESPN's linear television channels online, on mobile devices, and on digital media players. The platform currently offers live streams of programming from ESPN, ESPN2, ESPN3, ESPNU, ESPNews, ESPN Deportes, ACC Network, SEC Network, ESPN+, and Longhorn Network, as well as supplemental programming from the channels (including alternate feeds and live events not carried on linear television).

The service first launched as a website known as ESPN Networks, with a pilot initially involving Time Warner Cable, and later Bright House Networks and Verizon Fios. In April 2011, ESPN launched a mobile app with similar functionality known as WatchESPN; in August 2011, the ESPN Networks website was brought under the WatchESPN branding as well. In 2015, ESPN began to integrate WatchESPN's streaming functionality into the main ESPN mobile app. In 2017, ESPN began to phase out the WatchESPN branding, and began an on-air promotional campaign directing viewers to the ESPN app. The standalone WatchESPN app and website were discontinued in 2019, with its functionality now contained within ESPN.com and the ESPN app.

In 2018, ESPN launched a standalone direct-to-consumer (DTC) product known as ESPN+, which primarily carries live events similar to ESPN3 that are not available on ESPN's linear networks, as well as other original studio and documentary programs. The service does not include content from the main ESPN networks, which can only be obtained via a television subscription, and are not currently available on a DTC basis.

In May 2025, ESPN announced a major revamp of its streaming operations to launch in late-2025 (initially referred to internally as ESPN's "flagship direct-to-consumer service"), which will see ESPN+ content become available to existing ESPN subscribers, and the main ESPN networks become available on a direct-to-consumer basis for the first time.

== History ==
=== As ESPN Networks ===
ESPN Networks logo used from 2010 to 2011.

WatchESPN originally launched on October 25, 2010, when Time Warner Cable became the first cable television provider to offer ESPN Networks, which provided subscribers to ESPN an online simulcast of the channel through a dedicated website. Bright House Networks (for which Time Warner Cable handles distribution agreements) began offering ESPN Networks on November 22, 2010. On January 25, 2011, ESPN Networks added streaming simulcast feeds of ESPN2 and ESPNU, as well as out-of-market sports packages ESPN Goal Line and ESPN Buzzer Beater to the website, accessible only to subscribers of those services. Verizon Fios began providing access to streams on the ESPN Networks website on February 17, 2011.

=== As WatchESPN ===
On April 7, 2011, ESPN released a mobile app called WatchESPN on the App Store for Apple devices, using the same subscriber authentication functionality to allow access to simulcasts of the available ESPN channels on the service via the iPhone, iPad and iPod Touch; the app was released on the Android Market (now Google Play) on May 9, 2011. The ESPN Networks website was subsequently rebranded under the WatchESPN name on August 31, 2011 (the "Watch" branding would later be extended to other TV Everywhere services from ESPN co-owner Disney–ABC Television Group, including those for ABC, Disney Channel/XD/Junior and Freeform; the apps for Disney's children's networks were later merged into a single app branded as DisneyNow),

On May 8, 2012, Comcast began allowing authenticated Xfinity TV customers access to WatchESPN's streams via the app, as part of a deal in which the streams available on WatchESPN would also be made available on Xfinity's 'watch now' website. On August 28, 2012, Midco began allowing access to WatchESPN's simulcasts for its customers. Charter added access to the service in mid-February 2013. Dish Network, the first satellite provider to provide access to WatchESPN, announced it had added the service on April 1, 2014.

Longhorn Network and SEC Network programs were added to the service upon SEC Network's launch on August 14, 2014 (Longhorn Network was contractually limited to Big 12 states, and not available nationwide through WatchESPN). ESPN Classic was never made available on WatchESPN due to a lack of live sports rights and licensing limitations, along with a general move to a video on demand model.

=== ESPN app, discontinuation of the WatchESPN branding (2017–2025) ===
In 2015, ESPN began to integrate streaming functionality into its main mobile app. In August 2017, ESPN began to significantly downplay the WatchESPN brand in favor of promoting the ESPN app, including an advertising campaign coinciding with college football season and the US Open. ESPN withdrew the WatchESPN app from the App Store and Google Play on July 1, 2019, and redirected the web presence of WatchESPN to an equivalent section on ESPN.com.

In 2018, ESPN launched a standalone direct-to-consumer subscription service known as ESPN+, which primarily carries events or coverage not available on ESPN's linear channels, as well as other original programming. Some of its programming was formerly carried on ESPN3, thus effectively paywalling it. The service also does not include programming from ESPN's linear channels.

=== "Flagship" streaming service (2025–) ===
In May 2023, The Wall Street Journal reported that ESPN was developing a direct-to-consumer, over-the-top subscription service internally codenamed "Flagship", which would primarily feature the programming of the main ESPN linear networks; the service would make their content available on a fully standalone basis for the first time, as they were previously only available as part of traditional subscription TV bundles offered by cable, satellite, and virtual MVPD providers.

As part of this project, ESPN was reported to be in negotiations with television providers and sports leagues to give it the flexibility to launch such a service; in 2023 and 2024 respectively, Disney reached new carriage agreements with Charter Communications and DirecTV that included rights to distribute "Flagship" at no additional cost to existing ESPN subscribers. On February 7, 2024, Disney chief executive Bob Iger announced during an earnings call that the service would launch in late August or fall 2025. The new service was initially referred to by ESPN and Disney as the "ESPN flagship direct-to-consumer service", with external trade media referring to the service as "ESPN Flagship" or simply "Flagship" pending an official announcement.

In May 2025, Iger confirmed that "Flagship" would be available "automatically" for all existing ESPN subscribers on televising providers, confirming it would also serve as a successor to ESPN's current TVE platform. During the Disney upfront on May 13, ESPN president Jimmy Pitaro officially announced the new ESPN streaming platform and DTC service, which are expected to launch in fall 2025. The service will not be marketed under a distinct branding, in order to signify that it will be ESPN's core offering for all subscribers regardless of platform, and to avoid suffixes (such as "plus") common to the branding of other streaming platforms.

The ESPN DTC service will be available in two tiers, with a "Select" plan at $11.99 that will consist of the existing ESPN+ content, and an "Unlimited" plan at $29.99 per-month that adds programming from all ESPN linear channels, as well as ESPN on ABC telecasts. Existing subscribers will be migrated to the new offering. The service will be available via The Disney Bundle. It will be distributed via updated versions of the ESPN apps, with subscribers also receiving access to new features integrating with ESPN's fantasy sports platform and the ESPN Bet sportsbook, the ability to generate customized editions of SportsCenter tailored to a user's interests, as well as new ticketing and merchandising capabilities. Some reports have suggested the service will eventually include the ability to host user-generated content.

== Distribution ==
Simulcasts of the ESPN channels available on the WatchESPN app and website (including ESPN Goal Line and ESPN Buzzer Beater) were available through TV Everywhere subscription authentication through a number of providers which expanded through the years after new carriage agreements were negotiated. In 2015, as part of a new agreement with The Walt Disney Company, DirecTV (the largest holdout among major pay TV providers) added authentication rights to WatchESPN for its subscribers. Two major IPTV providers, Dish's Sling TV and PlayStation Vue, also offered authentication to WatchESPN.

ESPN3, a similar service that had operated separately from WatchESPN until it was integrated into the service in 2011, is available through many other cable providers including those listed above. In all cases, a TV Everywhere login (or other login code for university and military customers) through a customer's service provider is required to access the services; ESPN3 is also accessible without login if the user's IP address can be traced to a participating ISP.

=== Channel simulcasts ===
- ESPN
- ESPN2
- ESPNU
- ESPNews
- ESPN Deportes
- ESPN Goal Line & Bases Loaded
- Longhorn Network (limited on most providers to Big 12 Conference territory)
- SEC Network & SEC Network Alternate
- ACC Network

=== Internet-only channels ===
- ACC Network Extra
- ESPN3
- Extra network streams during event coverage such as the College Football Playoff games
- @ESPN (free content)

== Platforms ==
=== Website ===
The WatchESPN.com website allowed viewers to view and switch between up to 20 events in a main viewing window, along with on-demand access after an event's end. The WatchESPN player additionally features four modules: Featured Events (which shows viewers highlights of live and upcoming events available on WatchESPN), Stats (which features statistics from the streamed event), the Chat 140 section (which allowed fans to discussion the events with other fans; this was later withdrawn as ESPN removed commenting functionality), and Facebook connect (which connects fans to their Facebook profile and allowed them to both post about the event that they are watching on their wall and discuss the event with other Facebook fans; this was also removed when ESPN removed commenting functionality).

=== Mobile devices ===
WatchESPN was available through the ESPN app for Android and iOS, and the WatchESPN app for Windows Phone. In December 2015, WatchESPN's streaming features were integrated directly into the main ESPN app for Android and iOS, with the standalone WatchESPN app deprecated on these platforms.

=== Digital media players ===
On June 19, 2013, the service became available through Apple TV. WatchESPN became available on Roku streaming players on November 12, 2013. Chromecast support was added to the Android and iOS apps as part of an update released on June 3, 2014. Eventually, these apps became known as the ESPN app over time and added other functionality.

=== Windows 8/10 ===
The WatchESPN app became available for download for compatible Windows 8 and Windows 8.1 devices from the Windows Store in February 2014, a version also compatible with Windows 10. Support for the app was withdrawn on June 30, 2017.

=== Video game systems ===
The WatchESPN service is available for download for the PlayStation 4 and Xbox One. The ESPN app for Xbox 360 was discontinued on March 23, 2016.

== See also ==
- DisneyNow
- Hulu
- Philo
- Bally Sports app
- NBC Sports Live Extra
- FuboTV
- Eleven Sports
