= ESPN Plaza =

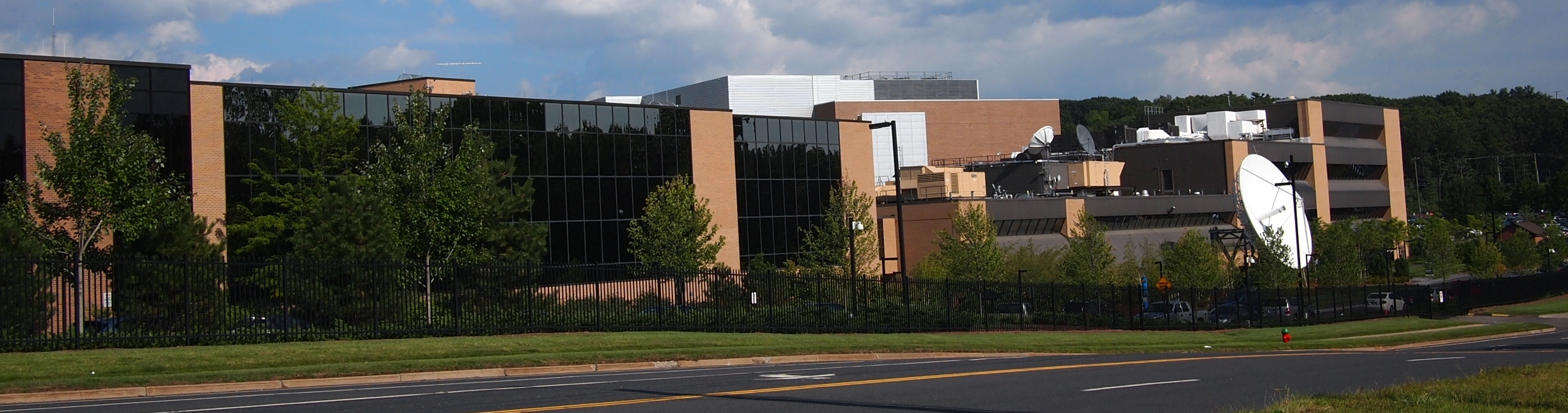

General information
- Type: Film and television production studio
- Location: 935 Middle Street; Bristol, Connecticut; 06010
- Coordinates: 41°38′52″N 72°54′8″W
- Opening: September 7, 1979
- Owner: ESPN, LLC

ESPN Plaza, sometimes referred to as the ESPN Campus, is a television and radio production complex located in Bristol, Connecticut. The complex houses production and broadcasting facilities for ESPN, LLC including its ESPN, ESPN2, ESPNU, ESPNews, ESPN Radio, ESPN Deportes, SEC, and ACC networks along with the ESPN+ and ESPN Unlimited streaming services and studio segments for ESPN on ABC broadcasts. The facility is also where its SportsCenter and E:60 studio programs are broadcast from. In total, the complex spans 1,319,473 square feet.

== History ==
ESPN was originally founded by Bill Rasmussen, his son Scott Rasmussen, and 43-year-old eye doctor and Aetna insurance agent Ed Eagan. In the process of looking for a headquarters for what was Entertainment and Sports Programming (ESP), They originally began looking for land in Plainville, however, due to an ordinance that prohibited satellite dishes, ESP could not settle there. Instead, they chose to buy a parcel of land for $18,000 in Bristol that had been built on a dump, the satellite signal was unaffected in the area, making it an ideal location. Getty Oil provided funding to buy the plot of land and would eventually purchase the network from the Rasmussens on February 22, 1979. The studio opened on September 7, 1979 with the first program filmed at the studio being the premiere edition of SportsCenter which was taped in front of a small live audience.

on October 5, 2000, ESPN finalized the purchase of nine parcels in Bristol and Southington as part of an expansion for its headquarters.

In July 2011, ESPN broke ground on a state-of-the-art $100-million digital studio dubbed "Digital Center 2" which would operate as a data center and studio space for ESPN's various programs. During the construction, ESPN was received $25 million in loans, grants, and tax exemptions for construction, worker training, and equipment under Leadership in Energy and Environmental Design (LEED) certification. The first program to be broadcast from Digital Center 2 was a Sunday night edition of SportsCenter in 2014.

On April 26, 2017, ESPN announced that ESPNU's studio operations would be relocated from Charlotte, North Carolina to ESPN's headquarters in Bristol, Connecticut. The SEC Network and ESPN Events's production facilities would remain in Charlotte.
