= ESPN Broadband =

Business unit of the Walt Disney company

ESPN Broadband is a business unit of the ESPN company - itself a subsidiary of The Walt Disney Company. This unit focuses on providing sports content to users over a high speed internet connection. It is divided into five areas: ESPN Motion, ESPN3, ESPN Online Games, IpTV and ESPN PPV. By providing content online this service is able to allow users to watch sports games and sports related content such as ESPN documentaries and the SportsCenter TV show. This is one of the ways in which new media and broadband internet are beginning to compete with the Television industry in general, changing from a force fed consumption model of entertainment, to one that allows user generated play lists, interactivity, and custom content.

== ESPN Motion ==
ESPN Motion is the all access portion of ESPN's broadband content. All users can view video on this player at ESPN.com.

== ESPN3 ==
ESPN3, originally known as ESPN360, is the subscription portion of ESPN broadband. It has its own URL, [ESPN3.com]. It is not a typical subscription site in that a user is unable to pay for the subscription themselves. Instead, a user's Internet service provider, such as Verizon, provides them with access to ESPN3.

== ESPN Online Games ==
ESPN Online Games are a collection of sports-themed internet video games available on the ESPN3 broadband internet channel. There are currently two collections of games. The first is “Arena Games,” which features a home run derby style baseball game; a 3-point shooter basketball game and Throwdown, a four-round boxing game. The second section is “Bar Sports” which features air hockey, bar curling and a coin toss game. The games are played at espngames.com

The games are reached through an interactive locker room and ESPNzone respectively. The locker room features a wise-cracking Janitor named Willy who also appears in Home Run Derby and Throwdown, coaching players in how to play each of the games. It also features video and photo content, and explorable lockers. The ESPNzone features video patrons and a number of Easter eggs, such as a stadium from which a ball is hit.

The games were produced using Flash 8. They combined video footage, animation and 3-d rendering to offer a feeling of hyperreality. The use of video footage gives many of the games the look and feel of games played on the Sega CD platform as well as many of the pre-3D PC games. ESPN Online games are played in a virtual “Game Controller” that looks remarkable like a Sony PSP. This virtual controller can be flipped over to view a leader board, a friends list and avatar generator.

The leader board tracks scores gained within each of the video games as well as the composite score for both the Bar Games and Arena Games areas. It breaks the scores into four color-coded tiers: Rookie (brown), Pro (blue), Veteran (gold) and All-Star (green). A user is able to see their own rank in the pyramid-shaped leader board, as well as scroll over to see which scores they have to beat to get reach the top. The leader board is viewable in a basic mode, which shows only the tier you belong to, and a composite mode, which shows your overall ranking for a game or section. There is also a custom competition circle leader board, which players make by challenging their friends.

ESPN Online Games not really also feature viral marketing through a component referred to as “competition circles”. Competition circles are built through a challenge screen, which allows a player to send an email to their friends to beat their high score. If these friends visit a link contained within the email they are added to a custom leader board which only competition circle members can see.

The avatar generator allows users to create a “game face” that is a combination of different facial features. Users are allowed to select their one head, nose, mouth, eyes and “shwag” elements in an advanced editor, or to use a pre-made basic face. These elements are photo-realistic, like many of the other game elements.

== IpTV ==
ESPN Television content delivered over the web through an[IP address].

== ESPN PPV ==
ESPN broadband available through Apple Computer's iTunes store.
