= ESPN Deportes.com =

Spanish language sports website

ESPN Deportes.com is a Spanish language sports website launched by ESPN in 2000. Currently, it has regional editions for the Argentina, Chile, Colombia, Mexico, United States and Venezuela. The website features news, analysis and results of several sports, including association football, American football, baseball, basketball, boxing, motorsport, tennis, rugby union, golf and polo, as well as the Olympic Games and X Games. Some sections are branded, such as ESPN FC (association football) and ESPNscrum (rugby).

Several journalists from ESPN Deportes and ESPN Latin America also appear on ESPN Deportes.com, including Raúl Allegre, John Sutcliffe, Ciro Procuna, Francisco Alemán, Tito Puccetti, Enrique Sacco and Martín Urruty.

According to Alexa, ESPN Deportes.com is ranked as the 47th most visited website in Mexico, 87th in Venezuela, 130th in Colombia, and 194th in Argentina. Also according to Alexa, 6.1% of the ESPN.com traffic goes to ESPN Deportes.com, and is the 65th most visited Spanish language website.

A SDP Noticias journalist ranked ESPN Deportes.com as the best Spanish-language sports website, beating Fox Sports, Marca and AS.
