= DisneyNow =

American video-on-demand portal for Disney networks

DisneyNOW
- Available in: English
- Founded: September 29, 2017
- Dissolved: September 23, 2024; 23 months ago (mobile app only)
- Successor: Disney+ (app)
- Headquarters: {{{location_country}}}
- Area served: United States
- Parent: Disney Branded Television (Disney General Entertainment Content)
- Website: https://disneynow.com/
- Advertising: The Walt Disney Company
- Commercial: Yes
- Registration: Optional Disney.com account, with separate TV Everywhere credentials required for most content
- Current status: Online, only accessible through computers

DisneyNow (stylized as DisneyNOW) is a TV Everywhere and streaming platform offered by Disney Kids & Family. The service offers programming from Disney Channel, Disney Jr, and Disney XD for subscribers to the three networks on television providers.

It launched on September 29, 2017, replacing the individual "Watch" apps that originally launched for these networks in 2012, as well as the networks' respective official websites. The mobile and digital media player apps for the platform were discontinued on September 23, 2024; service remains available on traditional computers and web browsers.

== History ==
Disney first launched TV Everywhere services for Disney Channel, Disney Jr., and Disney XD in June 2012—the "Watch" apps (whose branding were modeled after WatchESPN)—as part of new carriage agreements with Comcast Xfinity that included digital rights to the programming of Disney's cable channels via authenticated streaming.

In February 2017, during upfronts presentations for its children's channels, Disney announced that the individual "Watch" apps for Disney Channel, Disney Junior, and Disney XD would be replaced with DisneyNow; the service integrated the three channels' content, along with Radio Disney, into a unified library. It also included games based on programs from the three channels, a profile system, and parental controls. The new app launched on September 29, 2017 for Android, iOS, Apple TV, and Roku, with Android TV, and Amazon Fire TV versions following in the next year.

On December 1, 2018, Chinese animated series Stitch & Ai, a spin-off of the Lilo & Stitch franchise that originally aired in 2017, made its American debut on DisneyNow, with twelve of the series' thirteen episodes released on the service.

With the launch of the new subscription-based streaming service Disney+ on November 12, 2019, Disney began to transition library content from DisneyNow to Disney+ in order to encourage service subscriptions.

On August 23, 2024, Disney began notifying its carriage partners that it would discontinue the mobile and digital media player apps for DisneyNow, along with ABC, Freeform, FX, and National Geographic, effective September 23. However, TV Everywhere content would still be available via their respective websites in order to funnel viewers towards Disney+ and Hulu. Games were subsequently removed from DisneyNOW's website on November 14.

== See also ==
- Disney+
- Movies Anywhere
- Apple TV+
- ESPN+
