= Maxx Zoom =

Maxx Zoom is a camera system used by ESPN for creating close-up replays on Monday Night Football. It was introduced in the 41st season (2010) and was developed by Camargus in collaboration with Fletcher Chicago.

== Technical description ==
Maxx Zoom consists of four compact unmanned camera units. Units are placed in pairs along the goal line, where each pair is covering the endzone from opposing angles. The units consist of clusters of four miniature cameras. The images from these cameras are combined using image stitching into a large, high-resolution video feed. Each cluster's pixel count adds up to total resolution of up to 8 times 1080p resolution or 16 times 720p resolution (16 Megapixel). This allows for digital zooming into players near the endzone without loss of quality or detail. Its main purpose is to analyze contested plays. For instance, during the New Orleans Saints at San Francisco 49ers game, an NFL official reversed his call on a 2-point conversion based on the Maxx Zoom replay. According to ESPN director Chip Dean, Maxx Zoom is the top development on this year’s broadcasts.

== See also ==
- Camargus website
- Fletcher website
- Maxx Zoom clips at CamargusDotCom Youtube channel
