= The ESPN Sports Poll =

The ESPN (Chilton) Sports Poll was created by the Chilton Company in 1993 and launched on January 4, 1994. The Sports Poll was the first ongoing research service to measure sports fan interests, activities and preferences in the United States. In 1997, the influence of the Sports Poll was recognized by Sporting News: "the ESPN Chilton poll, in less than three years, has become the single most utilized sports intelligence service in the U.S., a staple now of sports organizations, media and sponsoring companies. His research provides timely data on sports fan interests and behaviors year round, which is an invaluable marketing tool."

Included in topics covered by the Sports Poll: Favorite sport; fan and avid fan base by sport for 20+ different sports; favorite athletes by sport; favorite team by sport; amount and way of following sports; awareness of sponsorships; purchase of sports related products and services.

The ESPN Sports Poll has collected 1,000–2,000 interviews a month continuously since January 1994. The over 200,000 interviews and over 2,000 different questions on the Poll have led to reports that have been published in hundreds of newspapers and magazines. Sports marketing textbooks routinely include the Sports Poll and data. Seventy-five percent of the course grade for a university class was based on analysis of Sports Poll data.
