= TV Everywhere =

Authentication for streaming video

The Cable & Telecommunications Association for Marketing introduced a logo (pictured) intended for marketing TV Everywhere services.

TV Everywhere (also known as authenticated streaming or authenticated video on-demand) refers to a type of American subscription business model where access to streaming video content from a television channel requires users to "authenticate" themselves as current subscribers to the channel, via an account provided by their participating pay television provider, to access the content.

Under the model, broadcasters offer their customers the ability to access content from their channels through internet-based services and mobile apps—either live or on-demand, as part of a subscription to the service. Time Warner Cable first proposed the concept in 2009; in 2010, many television providers and networks began to roll out TV Everywhere services for their subscribers, including major networks such as TBS and TNT (whose owner, Time Warner, was an early supporter of the concept), ESPN, and HBO among others. Broadcast television networks have also adopted TV Everywhere restrictions for their online content, albeit in a less broadly than their cable counterparts.

Television providers and broadcasters have touted the advantages of being able to access content across multiple platforms, including on the internet, and on mobile devices (such as smartphones and tablet computers), as part of their existing television subscription. Upon its establishment, the TV Everywhere concept received criticism for being difficult for end-users to set up, while media activists have criticized the concept for being a paywall that extends the existing oligarchy of the subscription television industry to the internet, and considering it to be collusion against cord cutters—those who drop cable and satellite entirely in favor of accessing content via terrestrial television, the internet, and subscription video on demand (SVOD) services.

== Rationale ==
TV Everywhere services were developed in an attempt to compete with the market trend of cord cutting, where consumers drop traditional pay television subscriptions in favor of accessing TV content exclusively through over-the-air television and/or online on-demand services, including Hulu, Netflix, YouTube, and other sources. Authenticated streaming and video on-demand services allow traditional television providers to directly compete with these competitors, and add value to existing television subscriptions in an effort to retain subscribers.

In particular, broadcasters and providers have emphasized the use of TV Everywhere services to allow multi-platform access to their content, on devices such as personal computers, smartphones, tablets, digital media players, and video game consoles.

== History ==
=== Precursors ===
ESPN first introduced a TV Everywhere-like concept with ESPN360, a service which allowed users to stream sports programming from its networks either live or on-demand through a website. However, access to ESPN360 was restricted to the users of internet service providers who had negotiated deals with ESPN to offer the service; a model closer in nature to cable television carriage. Similar tactics were soon used by several other channels, such as NFL Network (who used the technique to restrict access to its Game Extra service for Thursday Night Football) and Epix (an early pioneer of the concept for the premium cable industry). David Preschlack, ESPN's executive vice president for affiliate sales and marketing, foresaw a future in the model, believing that access to exclusive content would soon play a greater role in competition between high-speed internet providers. However, the model was deemed a violation of the principles of net neutrality by some critics.

=== Introduction and adoption ===
In 2009, Time Warner Cable announced an initiative known as TV Everywhere, a set of principles "designed to serve as a framework to facilitate deployment of online television content in a way that is consumer friendly, pro-competitive." The concept would enable users of their respective cable television services to access live and on-demand online content from channels that they subscribe to by using an account-based authentication system. TWC CEO Jeffrey Bewkes believed that the TV Everywhere principles were "good concepts" "likely to be the general direction for all TV networks and all the distribution connections that are out there." That summer, both TWC and Comcast began trials of services based on the system; Turner Broadcasting was an early supporter of the system, providing access to TBS and TNT content as part of the trials. Comcast officially launched a public beta of its TV Everywhere-based portal, Xfinity Fancast, in December 2009 for all double-play television and internet customers. Afterwards, other providers began to follow suit.

In 2010, broadcasters and television providers began a wider roll-out of TV Everywhere-based services; for the 2010 Winter Olympics, NBC Sports offered live and video on-demand access to events throughout the Games that required users to authenticate for access. Also in February, HBO launched HBO Go, a video on demand service exclusive to HBO subscribers on participating providers. In September 2010, Disney would begin launching an array of TV Everywhere-based services, including WatchESPN (a successor to ESPN360 offered to ESPN television subscribers), and similar apps for Disney Channel and Disney XD.

In August 2011, Fox became the first over-the-air network to restrict on-demand access with a TV Everywhere-based system; "next day" on-demand episodes (either through its website or Hulu, itself a joint venture between Fox, NBC, and ABC at the time) would only be available online to users authenticating themselves as a subscriber to a cable or satellite provider, or those who subscribe to the Hulu Plus service. All other users would be subject to an eight-day delay. On September 1, 2011, fellow Fox property Big Ten Network (a college sports network dedicated to the Big Ten Conference, operated in partnership with Fox Sports) also launched a TV Everywhere service known as BTN2Go.

=== Expansion ===
Matt Strauss, Comcast senior vice president of digital and emerging platforms, considered the 2012 Summer Olympics to be a "watershed" event for TV Everywhere services; NBCUniversal announced that a total of nearly 10 million authenticated devices accessed its online coverage during the Games across both the NBCOlympics.com site and NBC Olympics Live Extra app; in particular, parent company Comcast accounted for 3.3 million devices from 1.5 million users. Following the Games, the app was rebranded as NBC Sports Live Extra.

TV Everywhere services also began to appear in Canada in the early 2010s, with the Canadian launch of HBO Go in 2012, and the 2013 announcement of TV Everywhere services from Bell Media (beginning with Bravo Go, and also including CTV Go) and Shaw Media (beginning with Global). The majority of Canadian broadcasters are vertically integrated; both Bell and Shaw operate internet service providers and national satellite television services.

In May 2013, ABC released its Watch ABC mobile app, which allows viewers on participating providers to access live streams from participating ABC affiliates. In December 2013, ABC confirmed that it would impose a similar restriction to Fox for "next day" on-demand episodes beginning on January 6, 2014, with seven-day exclusivity for authenticated users and Hulu Plus subscribers. NBC unveiled its own plans for a similar TV Everywhere app to its affiliate board in April 2014.

In November 2015, after negotiations surrounding revenue sharing and infrastructural mandates (including a proposed requirement that the games only be available through the league's existing apps), Major League Baseball reached a three-year deal with Fox to allow it to offer in-market online streaming on Fox Sports Go (though streamed using MLB Advanced Media infrastructure) for the 16 teams that it holds regional rights to through the Fox Sports Networks division. In December 2015, Discovery Communications, a long hold-out on the concept, launched Discovery Go, a centralized TV Everywhere service and mobile app for Discovery Channel, TLC, and its array of sister networks.

=== Shift to subscription-based services ===
In the late-2010's, a number of major media companies began to shift their priorities towards direct-to-consumer, subscription-based streaming services, in order to specifically attract cord cutters and increase their competitiveness with competitors such as Netflix and Amazon Prime Video. Some of these forays either subsume content previously distributed via a TV Everywhere model, or represent a hybrid approach of a service that can be obtained direct-to-consumer or via a television provider (through authentication or promotional offers):

- In 2018, ESPN launched ESPN+, which began to subsume much of the overflow content that had previously been available at no extra charge to ESPN subscribers via WatchESPN.
- In 2018, Bell Media merged its OTT service CraveTV with its pay television service The Movie Network, with the merged service taking on the Crave branding and becoming available on a direct-to-consumer basis.
- HBO and NBCUniversal both launched streaming services in 2020, HBO Max and Peacock. HBO Max replaced both HBO Go and a previous direct-to-consumer offering, HBO Now, and is available to HBO subscribers via television providers at no additional charge using the TV Everywhere system. Peacock's ad-supported premium tier is similarly offered to television subscribers via agreements with individual providers, such as NBCUniversal parent Comcast and Charter.
- On January 31, 2024, Paramount Global discontinued the TV Everywhere apps for its entertainment networks in order to direct users to Paramount+, including Comedy Central, MTV, Nickelodeon, and Paramount Network. In June 2024, Paramount also shut down the individual websites for networks such as CMT, Comedy Central, and TV Land, removing all archive and video on-demand content (including journalistic content), and replacing them with websites with minimal functionality that primarily promote Paramount+. Various tiers of Paramount+ have been made available via the TV Everywhere log-in system to providers like Spectrum.
- On September 23, 2024, Disney similarly discontinued the TV Everywhere apps for ABC, DisneyNow, Freeform, FX, and National Geographic Channel, likely in an effort to discourage their use in favor of Disney+ and Hulu. TV Everywhere access remains available through desktop and laptop computers. The ad-supported tier of Disney+ has been made available to some Spectrum subscribers as part of an individual carriage agreement.

== Reception ==
The TV Everywhere concept has been met with mixed reception. Some broadcasters were initially hesitant to introduce TV Everywhere services, with concerns that they might affect advertising revenue and not be adequately counted by Nielsen ratings. Songwriters Guild of America president Rick Carnes praised the TV Everywhere concept and other recent developments for helping to provide easier, legal access to premium content online.

Media activists have criticized the concept as protecting the existing closed, regionalized oligarchy of multichannel television by tying digital content to traditional television subscriptions, thus harming fully over-the-top competitors. Public Knowledge believed that "under the 'TV Everywhere' plan, no other program distributors would be able to emerge, and no consumers will be able to 'cut the cord' because they find what they want online. As a result, consumers will be the losers." A 2010 report by Free Press made similar arguments, contending that TV Everywhere was an act of collusion by the cable industry, and arguing that "by tying programming to local cable subscriptions, while denying content to pure online TV distributors, the incumbent industry hopes to artificially reproduce the lack of competition for TV distribution to which it is accustomed, based on geographical fiefdoms and turf." The NCTA denied many of Free Press' arguments, stating that it was "an effort to ensure more content than ever is distributed over the Internet at no extra charge to consumers."

In July 2014, BTIG analyst Richard Greenfield criticized the video on demand services offered through TV Everywhere systems for being ad-supported. In examples from FX and TNT, he noticed that ads often repeated, and that in TNT's case, its version of an episode of The Last Ship included 20 minutes of unskippable ads across 45 minutes of programming. In conclusion, he contended that viewers would rather wait for programs to appear on subscription streaming services rather than use TV Everywhere services.

=== Viewer awareness ===
Despite efforts by broadcasters to educate viewers on TV Everywhere services and how to utilize them (including Fox, which produced a promotional video starring Jane Lynch as her Glee character Sue Sylvester, describing the process as being less painful than waterboarding), critics and end-users criticized the registration and authentication processes for being frustrating and difficult. In response, providers took steps to improve their user experiences; Disney reported that use of its TV Everywhere services increased after it simply changed its process to use the term "verify" instead of "authenticate", Cablevision, Comcast, and Verizon introduced systems that automatically verify users with their residential gateways, and Synacor (a provider of authentication platforms used by providers) added the ability for users to link their provider account to a social network login, such as Facebook or Twitter.

For the 2012 Summer Olympics and 2014 Winter Olympics, NBC worked closer with providers to help educate users, and produced customized marketing materials and video tutorials featuring Carson Daly (2012) and Ryan Seacrest (2014) to help inform users. As an incentive, NBC also allowed authenticated users to enter a sweepstakes to win a trip to London (2012) or Rio de Janeiro (2014).

Still, with dissatisfaction with the system and the quality of NBC's overall coverage, there was an increase in the use of virtual private network (VPN) services to access the more comprehensive online coverage of the Games being provided by broadcasters in Canada (CTV in London, CBC in Sochi) and the United Kingdom (BBC), which only used geoblocking and did not require TV Everywhere authentication.

In April 2014, the Cable & Telecommunications Association for Marketing (CTAM) unveiled an industry-wide initiative for marketing and educating subscribers about TV Everywhere services provided by broadcasters and providers; these efforts include a stylized "tv everywhere" logo which the organization intends providers to use as a unified brand to denote TV Everywhere services. The logo consists of interlocking rectangles, representing multiple "screens" (platforms) for viewing content. The association also provided design recommendations for TV Everywhere user experiences, aiming to alleviate the confusion that had been experienced by users during the authentication process.

=== Adoption ===
In a December 2013 survey of 4,205 pay television subscribers, NPD Group found that 21% of them used a TV Everywhere service at least once per month, and that 90% of them were satisfied with the experience. NPD analyst Russ Crupnick felt that "aggressive" use of the model was helping to counter cord cutting, which "speaks to the level of engagement they have with programming and a comfort in using the Internet to both access and interact with that programming." The study also found that 3 out of 10 pay television subscribers who were also subscribed to an SVOD service used TV Everywhere services at least once a week (in comparison to 2 out of 10 for those who were not).

Amid criticism of NBC's coverage, adoption of NBC's TV Everywhere services during the 2014 Winter Olympics was still significantly large: on February 21, 2014, coverage of the Men's hockey semi-final featuring the U.S. and Canada recorded the largest Live Extra audience in NBC Sports history, with 2.12 million unique viewers, augmenting the average NBCSN television audience of 3.9 million. ESPN's coverage of the 2014 FIFA World Cup drew similarly heavy online viewership: during a group stage match between the U.S. and Portugal, at least 1.7 million concurrent viewers were using WatchESPN (though, not all of the viewers were necessarily watching the game).

In December 2015, research firm GfK estimated that 53% of the United States' pay television subscribers have used a TV Everywhere service—an increase from 42% in 2012, that overall use had doubled since 2012, and 79% of those surveyed found the login process easy. However, only 25% of those surveyed were aware of the term "TV Everywhere" or the CTAM logo, leading to the firm believing that consumer awareness and education was still a "critical missing piece" in the adoption of these services.

=== Non-neutrality ===
In 2014, Comcast was criticized for its decision to arbitrarily block access to HBO Go on PlayStation and Roku devices, but still allowing its use on competing Apple TV and Xbox 360. Comcast similarly blocked access to Showtime Anytime on Roku as well. A spokesperson for the provider stated that "with every new website, device or player we authenticate, we need to work through technical integration and customer service which takes time and resources. Moving forward, we will continue to prioritize as we partner with various players."

During both the FCC's net neutrality hearings and comments regarding Comcast's then-proposed merger with Time Warner Cable (which, by contrast, allows HBO Go access on all supported devices), Roku criticized the provider for contradicting the TV Everywhere concept by discriminating against specific devices, thus prioritizing its own on-demand platform over external services. The company argued that providers could selectively favor certain platforms over others, further stating that "a large and powerful MVPD may use this leverage in negotiations with content providers or operators of streaming platforms, ultimately favoring parties that can either afford to pay for the privilege of authentication, or have other business leverage that can be used as a counterweight to discriminatory authentication."

On December 15, 2014, Comcast enabled the ability to use HBO Go and Showtime Anytime on Roku devices. However, Comcast still blocked HBO Go on PlayStation consoles until December 2016.

In January 2025, Rogers Cable dropped TV Everywhere support for CTV (a television network owned by rival Bell Media) for undisclosed reasons.

=== Password sharing ===
In some instances, users deliberately shared their TV Everywhere login credentials, or the credentials were sold without the owner's knowledge on the black market, which allowed others to view programs without subscribing to the channel. Charter Communications CEO Tom Rutledge and ESPN's executive vice president for affiliate sales and marketing Justin Connolly have considered this practice equivalent to piracy. In December 2017, it was reported that television providers and program distributors had begun to implement measures to discourage this practice, including reducing the length of login session, reducing the number of concurrent streams allowed on one account, and monitoring unusual usage patterns such as large numbers of concurrent streams on a single account—especially those originating from outside of the customer's region, or during major programs.

In August 2019, as part of its latest carriage agreement, it was announced that Charter and Disney would "work together to implement business rules and techniques to address such issues as unauthorized access and password sharing."

By contrast, HBO's then-CEO Richard Plepler argued in an interview that intentional password sharing did not impact their business, and was a "marketing vehicle" that could help attract new subscribers, while Netflix CEO Reed Hastings similarly argued that "household sharing leads to new customers because kids subscribe on their own as they start to earn income".
