= ESPN.com =

Official website of ESPN

- Available in: English
- Headquarters: Bristol, Connecticut
- Owner: ESPN, LLC
- Parent: ESPN Internet Ventures
- Website: www.espn.com
- Commercial: Yes
- Registration: Available, but not required
- Launched: April 1, 1995; 31 years ago (as ESPNET.SportsZone.com)
- Current status: Active

ESPN.com is the official website of ESPN. It is owned by ESPN Internet Ventures, a division of ESPN, LLC.

== History ==
Since launching in April 1995 as ESPNET.SportsZone.com (ESPNET SportsZone), the website has developed numerous sections including: Page 2, SportsNation, ESPN3, ESPN Motion, My ESPN, ESPN Sports Travel, ESPN Video Games, ESPN Insider, ESPN.com's Fanboard, ESPN Fantasy Sports, ESPNU.com, and ESPN Search. ESPN.com also has partnerships with MLB.com, NBA.com, NFL.com, WNBA.com, MLSsoccer.com, NHL.com, Baseball America, Golf Digest, Scouts Inc., Jayski.com, USGA.org, Sherdog.com, and Masters.org.

It also has sections devoted to certain sports and leagues including: the National Hockey League, National Football League, Major League Baseball, National Basketball Association, NASCAR, Indy Racing League, NCAA, golf, soccer, women's sports (ESPNW), cricket, and eSports. Each section contains pages devoted to: scores, teams, schedules, standings, players, transactions, news wires, injures, and columnists pages.

== Columnists ==
Some notable current and former ESPN.com and ESPNW.com columnists are Allison Glock, Jemele Hill, John Buccigross, Chris Mortensen, John Clayton, Adam Schefter, Andy Katz, Bill Simmons, Jayson Stark, Buster Olney, Paul Lukas, Gene Wojciechowski, Scoop Jackson, Pat Forde, Jim Caple, Michael Smith, and in the last stages of his journalism career, Hunter S. Thompson. The website was part of the MSN portal from 2001 to 2004. ESPN launched a Spanish language website in 2000, ESPN Deportes.com. The content of some ESPN.com articles is argued to have been plagiarized.

== ESPNW ==
ESPNW (stylized espnW) is a section on the ESPN.com website, focusing on women's sports stories and news. ESPNW's stated mission is to "inform and inspire female athletes and fans." The website covers a wide range of topics related to women in sports including women's soccer, martial arts, basketball, tennis, food and nutrition for athletes, Title IX legislation, LGBTQF inclusion, poetry, personal essays and music for athletes. Coverage of men's sports is also included on the website. In 2019, personal essays by feminist self defense practitioner Rachel Piazza and gymnast Ellen Hagan were featured in their culture section.

Since its inception ESPNW has included extensive coverage about women's soccer. The 2011 Women's World Cup was only the 6th women's World Cup and the participation of the United States helped raise domestic awareness about the involvement for women in soccer, such as Mia Hamm. According to journalist Jack Bell, author of the New York Times article "Hamm Joining ESPNW for Women's World Cup", "in the women’s game, the world is catching up to the United States; in the men’s game, the United States is always playing catch up."

ESPNW hired well regarded female athletes to commentate on their newly formed network. The involvement of such important figures as Mia Hamm helped grow ESPNW's reputation among sports fans. Hamm helped popularize the online network when she worked as a commentator during the 2011 World Cup for ESPNW as well as ESPN, ESPN2 and ESPN3.

== Local sites ==
ESPN started local chapters of its website in response to the decline of local sports coverage available as newspapers continue to go out of business across the country. Each page covers local professional and college teams, hiring locally known writers, and in some cases making use of the city's ESPN Radio affiliate. In markets where the ABC Owned Television Stations owns a station, their sports coverage is incorporated with the corresponding ESPN local site. Some local sites have expanded into high school sports coverage.

=== Current ===
- ESPNBoston.com – with affiliate WEEI
- ESPNChicago.com – with WMVP and WLS-TV
- ESPNCleveland.com – with affiliates WKNR and WWGK
- ESPNDallas.com
- ESPNLosAngeles.com – with KSPN and KABC-TV
- ESPNNewYork.com – with WEPN-FM and WABC-TV
