= ACC Network =

American subscription television channel

- Country: United States
- Broadcast area: Nationwide
- Headquarters: ESPN Plaza, 935 Middle Street, Bristol, Connecticut; Charlotte, North Carolina

Programming
- Language: English
- Picture format: 720p HDTV

Ownership
- Owner: The Walt Disney Company (72%; via ABC Inc.); Hearst Communications (18%); National Football League (10%)
- Parent: ESPN
- Sister channels: ABC; ESPN; ESPN (streaming service); ESPN+; ESPN2; ESPNews; ESPNU; ESPN Deportes; SEC Network; NFL Network; NFL RedZone

History
- Launched: August 22, 2019; 7 years ago

Links
- Webcast: espn.com/watch (U.S. cable internet subscribers only; requires login from pay television provider to access content)
- Website: espn.com

Availability

Streaming media
- Service(s): DirecTV, Sling TV, FuboTV, YouTube TV, Hulu + Live TV

ACC Network (ACCN) is an American multinational subscription-television channel owned and operated by ESPN. Dedicated to coverage of the Atlantic Coast Conference, it was announced in July 2016 and launched on August 22, 2019. The channel operates from ESPN's headquarters in Bristol, Connecticut, though some programming and staff is in Charlotte, North Carolina.

The network's digital platform, ACC Network Extra (ACCNX), carries ACC events not broadcast on television. It streams on ESPN+, as well as ESPN.com and the ESPN app for ACC Network subscribers.

== History ==
There had been repeated calls for the ACC to establish its own cable channel, similar to those that had or were being established by other Power Five conferences. From July 1, 2012, to June 30, 2013 (in the midst of realignment that saw Pittsburgh, Syracuse and Louisville announce that they would join the ACC, Maryland leave for the Big Ten, and Notre Dame join the ACC outside of football), the ACC took in less television revenue than the Pac-12, SEC and Big Ten conferences. The Big Ten and Pac-12 had already launched their own channels, while ESPN and the SEC had announced the SEC Network would launch in 2014. SEC Network's first year of operation increased the conference's television revenue by around $100 million.

In discussions with ESPN management, there were uncertainties over whether an ACC channel would be economically viable, due to cord cutting and changing television viewing habits. The stability of the ACC itself was also questioned, but was addressed in 2013 by requiring the conference's current teams to grant the ACC control of media rights to all home games through the 2026–2027 season, even if they leave the conference. This policy effectively discourages schools from leaving the ACC, and left the SEC as the only Power Five conference to not have a similar grant requirement. Eric J. Barron, president of Florida State University, stated that the grant would "ensure that the conference will strengthen its position of leadership among Division I athletics", and stated that "we are also very pleased that we will be moving forward on the next phase of developing an ACC network."

On July 21, 2016, at a media event in Charlotte, North Carolina, ESPN announced a 20-year extension of its contract with the ACC, and that it would launch a cable channel dedicated to the ACC in 2019 known as the ACC Network. The announcement was attended by then-ESPN president John Skipper and ACC commissioner John Swofford. Ahead of the television network's launch, ESPN announced that it would begin to stream ACC events beginning in the upcoming 2016 season. Following the announcement, Skipper defended the decision to go on with launching a linear television network, arguing that sports were the most valuable property on television because they are "the only thing you have to watch live".

Each ACC school constructed production facilities so they can contribute programming to the channel. Its operations are based out of ESPN's main studios in Bristol, but some programming originates from Charlotte, North Carolina (where SEC Network, and formerly ESPNU, also operate).

In November 2018, it was officially announced that ACCN would launch on August 22, 2019. Opening night programming included the ESPN Films documentary The Class That Saved Coach K, which chronicled Mike Krzyzewski's turnaround of the Duke Blue Devils basketball team in the 1980s. It aired its first football game on August 29, with the defending national champion Clemson Tigers hosting the Georgia Tech Yellow Jackets. In 2022, the ACC brought back old rivalries like the Backyard Brawl between the University of Pittsburgh Panthers and the West Virginia University Mountaineers. A friendly rivalry between University of Pittsburgh Panthers and Georgia Tech Yellow Jackets in memory of the 1956 Sugar Bowl and Bobby Grier, during the last game, actor Anthony Mackie appeared on field to honor Grier and the game.

== Programming ==
ACC Network is expected to carry 1,300 events per year. To provide more content for the channel, the ACC agreed to expand its conference schedule in college basketball to 20 games by the 2019–20 season. ESPN also acquired the secondary ACC rights previously sub-licensed to Raycom Sports for its syndicated ACC Network (the company will continue to be involved as a sub-contractee for events that can be carried by the new channel).

Mark Packer and Wes Durham host the morning show Packer and Durham, simulcast on ACCN and SiriusXM. All ACC will serve as the network's general news program, while The Huddle airs on Friday nights and Saturday mornings during football season.

As a prelude to the linear channel, and as part of ESPN's new rights package, ESPN's digital platform WatchESPN began to carry broadcasts of ACC sporting events not on television under the branding ACC Network Extra. ESPN promoted that it would carry over 600 live telecasts per season. ACCNX has continued its operations following the launch of the channel, becoming available exclusively to ACC Network subscribers.

== Carriage ==
ESPN stated in June 2017 that it had reached carriage deals for the ACC Network with unknown providers. In October 2017, Altice USA (now Optimum Communications) committed to offering the channel as part of in its latest round of carriage negotiations with Disney. On December 30, 2018, Disney reached a new carriage agreement with Verizon Fios, which included carriage of the ACC Network. On March 12, 2019, agreement was reached with AT&T to carry the ACC Network on DirecTV at launch. Live television streaming services Hulu, PlayStation Vue, YouTube TV and TVision Home also signed agreements to carry the channel at launch.

On August 14, Charter Spectrum, the largest cable provider in the ACC's heartland of North Carolina, agreed to carry ACCN as part of a new carriage agreement covering all Disney networks (including those acquired from 21st Century Fox). On August 29, Dish Network agreed to carry the network on both Dish satellite TV service and Sling TV streaming service just in time to broadcast the Clemson/Georgia Tech football game. On September 4, Cox Communications agreed to carry the network. On September 25, AT&T agreed to carry the network on both AT&T U-Verse and AT&T TV Now. Deals were also made with the National Rural Telecommunications Cooperative (NRTC), National Cable Television Cooperative (NCTC) and Vivicast to carry the channel at launch on various smaller cable TV systems across the country.

In the ACC Network's first athletic year, ESPN successfully negotiated the network's carriage to 70 million households on all major cable and satellite TV providers, with the sole exception of Comcast. The holdout, Comcast, which provides cable television to 19 million households as of Q3 2020, claimed in September 2019 that ESPN was not allowing them to carry the network at a "fair and reasonable cost" to their customers. Following a two-year holdout, ESPN and Comcast eventually came to a deal to carry ACC Network on Xfinity in November 2021.

== Personalities ==
- Mark Adams
- Cory Alexander
- Jay Alter
- Debbie Antonelli
- Wiley Ballard
- Paul Biancardi
- Carlos Boozer
- Dan Bonner
- Joel Berry II
- Dane Bradshaw
- John Brickley
- Drew Carter
- Randolph Childress
- Perry Clark
- Mike Corey
- Mike Couzens
- Jon Crispin
- Dalen Cuff
- Rece Davis
- Eric Devendorf
- Wes Durham
- Aja Ellison
- Dave Feldman
- Jimbo Fisher
- Eric Frede
- Katie George
- Joel Godett
- Kelly Gramlich
- Angel Gray
- Chelsea Gray
- Seth Greenberg
- Luke Hancock
- Jerod Haase
- Tim Hasselbeck
- Rich Hollenberg
- Jenn Hildreth
- Malcolm Huckaby
- Robert Lee
- Dave Leno
- EJ Manuel
- Ariya Massoudi
- Jon Meterparel
- Muffet McGraw
- Mike Monaco
- Mike Morgan
- Beth Mowins
- Dave O'Brien
- Terrence Oglesby
- Mark Packer
- David Padgett
- Roy Philpott
- Derek Jones
- Sam Ravech
- Mark Richt
- Kelsey Riggs
- Austin Rivers
- Kate Scott
- Doug Sherman
- Anish Shroff
- Ben Shulman
- KJ Smith
- Chris Spatola
- Fallon Stokes
- Christy Thomaskutty
- Jasmine Thomas
- Pam Ward
- Brooke Weisbrod
- Tim Welsh
- Stephanie White
- Helen Williams
