= ESPN Goal Line & Bases Loaded =

Defunct American sports television channel

ESPN Goal Line & ESPN Bases Loaded
- Country: United States
- Headquarters: Bristol, Connecticut

Programming
- Language: American English
- Picture format: 720p (HDTV)

Ownership
- Owner: ESPN Inc. (The Walt Disney Company (80%); Hearst Communications (20%))
- Sister channels: ABC; ESPN; ESPN2; ESPNEWS; ESPNU

History
- Launched: September 4, 2010
- Closed: January 13, 2020 (final program); June 30, 2020 (contractual sunsetting)

ESPN Goal Line & ESPN Bases Loaded was a gametime-only cable channel operated by ESPN which operated from the start of the 2010 college football season until the end of the 2019 college football season. The channel was active during two college sports seasons; during college football season as ESPN Goal Line and through the NCAA Division I Softball Championship for college softball and NCAA Division I Baseball Championship for college baseball as ESPN Bases Loaded. In both cases, the coverage provided live look-ins and analysis of multiple games in progress. The coverage switched between games to show interesting defensive plays and scoring drives, such as offensive teams entering the red zone (football) or with runners in scoring position (baseball/softball).

Goal Line aired during the regular season on Saturdays from 3:00 p.m. ET to approximately 11:30 p.m. It also ran throughout the playoffs as an alternate feed for Megacast coverage, usually as a "datacast" feed of extended data. The network was occasionally simulcast on ESPNews in the late afternoon or early evening when that channel was not carrying its own games. Bases Loaded operated during the early rounds of the NCAA Softball & Baseball Championship.

At its launch, the channel was made available to customers of Time Warner Cable and Bright House Networks systems, and became available soon after to customers of Verizon FiOS TV. In addition, the channel is also carried on Dish Network, Comcast, Cox Communications, Charter Communications, Sling TV, Cablevision, Hulu and DirecTV. During the network's downtime, it would promote the next week or event that would air with a still card and a loop of ESPN's college football theme of the time as background audio; cable providers were disallowed from using the channel space for other purposes.

The channel formerly operated a third iteration of the service in the same channel space during the college basketball season known as ESPN Buzzer Beater, which broadcast on Wednesday nights and Saturdays from December to early March. In July 2017, ESPN announced that it had discontinued Buzzer Beater, in order to "shift resources to better position ourselves for the long-term". The Goal Line and Bases Loaded services were not affected by this change.

Officially, the network's last program was the 2020 College Football Playoff National Championship on January 13, 2020, when it again carried the DataCast channel for ESPN's Megacast coverage.

== Network closing ==
The 2020 version of Bases Loaded would never occur, due to the coronavirus pandemic causing the cancellation of the 2020 NCAA baseball and softball seasons, including their associated baseball and softball tourneys; the cancellation was announced on March 12, 2020. One day after on March 13, Disney Media Distribution sent notice to providers that the network would be discontinued on June 30, 2020, with notice of it relayed to customers between late May and mid June. The discontinuation was thought of as a foregone conclusion, as ESPN pushes viewers to its streaming service, ESPN+, which allows the customer the choice of following any ESPN/ABC-aired game at their own pace, along with overall network cutbacks of extraneous wireline networks and connected on-air staff. With no other programming to promote, the channel space merely carried a looping video of the ESPN logo and audio of the network's default NCAA championship theme in the background after March 13, until the network feed was quietly dropped at 11:59 p.m. ET on June 30, 2020.

== See also ==
- NFL RedZone, a similar channel operated by the NFL Network
