= SEC Network =

U.S. NCAA Southeastern Conference sports TV network

- Country: United States
- Broadcast area: Nationwide
- Headquarters: Bristol, Connecticut; Charlotte, North Carolina

Programming
- Language: English
- Picture format: 720p (HDTV) (HD feed downgraded to letterboxed 480i for SDTV sets)

Ownership
- Owner: The Walt Disney Company (72%; via ABC Inc.); Hearst Communications (18%); National Football League (10%)
- Parent: ESPN
- Sister channels: ABC; ESPN; ESPN (streaming service); ESPN+; ESPN2; ESPNews; ESPNU; ESPN Deportes; ACC Network; NFL Network; NFL RedZone

History
- Launched: August 14, 2014; 11 years ago
- Replaced: SEC TV, Longhorn Network

Links
- Webcast: espn.com/watch (U.S. cable internet subscribers only; requires login from pay television provider to access content)
- Website: espn.com

Availability

Streaming media
- Service(s): Sling TV, DirecTV Stream, FuboTV, YouTube TV, Hulu + Live TV

SEC Network (SECN) is an American multinational sports network owned by ESPN, a joint venture between the Walt Disney Company (which operates the network, through its 72% controlling ownership interest via indirect subsidiary ABC Inc.), Hearst Communications (which owns 18%) and the National Football League (which owns 10%). The channel is dedicated to coverage of collegiate sports sanctioned by the Southeastern Conference (SEC) including live and recorded event telecasts, news, analysis programs and other content focusing on the conference's member schools.

As of August 2016, the network was estimated to be available in 70 million television households in the United States, more than any other conference-dedicated sports network and more than several professional league networks such as NBA TV, MLB Network, and NHL Network.

The network's coverage serves as the successor to an eponymous syndication package (later renamed SEC TV), which was produced by its syndication arm ESPN Regional Television. SEC Network is operated out of ESPN facilities in Charlotte, North Carolina, shared with ESPN Events, some operations for the ACC Network, and formerly ESPNU. While Charlotte is not an SEC market itself, it is in close proximity to universities that are members of the conference and shares a television market with the northern part of South Carolina, which is part of the South Carolina Gamecocks' television market.

The network's digital platform, SEC Network+ (SECN+), carries SEC events not broadcast on linear television. It streams on ESPN+, as well as ESPN.com and the ESPN app for SEC Network subscribers.

== History ==
On May 2, 2013, SEC Commissioner Michael Slive and ESPN president John Skipper formally announced that as part of a long-term, 20-year agreement lasting through 2034, ESPN would launch SEC Network, a network devoted to the conference and an accompanying digital platform, in August 2014. ESPN had launched the University of Texas-specific Longhorn Network in 2011, which would provide direction on implementation and much of the original staff of the SEC Network.

The network would aim to provide "unparalleled content from one of the most competitive conferences in the country with the highest quality, most innovative production partner in the sports industry", and joins the Big Ten Network and Pac-12 Network as cable television networks devoted entirely to a single college athletics conference.

During the announcement of the SEC's football schedule for the 2014 season, Michael Slive officially announced that SEC Network would launch on August 14, 2014. Its first live regular season football games aired on August 28, 2014, between Texas A&M and South Carolina, and Temple and Vanderbilt.

SEC Network officially launched on August 14, 2014, at 6:00 p.m. ET with the premiere of its news program SEC Now, which featured live broadcasts from each SEC school, highlights from football training camps, and live look-ins of an exhibition women's soccer game between the Arkansas Razorbacks and Creighton Bluejays (which was broadcast in its entirety via WatchESPN as the first live event produced by SEC Network).

In July 2024, SEC Network subsumed the scope of Longhorn Network after the Texas Longhorns move to the conference from the Big 12.

== Programming ==
SEC Network airs events across the 21 sports that are sanctioned by the conference; within its first year, the network and its digital outlets planned to broadcast at least 1,000 live events, with at least 450 on television. For football, SEC Network airs three Saturday games per week in early, afternoon and evening windows (plus any additional games on the alternate channel, if necessary), typically the least prominent games of the week. While CBS maintained its first pick of games for its 3 p.m. ET SEC on CBS window, SEC Network would be able to air other games in the window alongside CBS. SEC Network announced plans to broadcast football games featuring all fourteen of the conference's member schools within the first month of the 2014 season.

Events not broadcast on television are streamed online through ESPN.com, the ESPN app, and ESPN+ under the SEC Network+ branding. ESPN staff worked with each SEC member school to ensure that they have in-house production facilities capable of originating programming and live events for SEC Network. These games also include home Conference USA men's soccer matches featuring the two men's soccer playing members of the SEC.

Original content on SEC Network includes studio and analysis programs, along with programs produced by the SEC's member institutions. Paul Finebaum signed with ESPN Radio to host The Paul Finebaum Show, which is simulcast by SEC Network, along with Finebaum's previous flagship station WJOX-FM. During college football season, it airs SEC Nation, a travelling pre-game show similar to ESPN's own College GameDay, hosted by ESPN commentator Laura Rutledge. The network also airs encore presentations of SEC events, along with classic games involving its members. 2018 saw the premiere of the network's first non-sports series, True South, where food writer John T. Edge travels throughout the Southeast and highlights local cuisine and history.

During late July/early August, the network airs a marathon of programming featuring all 16 of the conference's schools, with each school “taking over” the network for 24 hours and airing various sporting events from the previous season and classic games as well.

== On-air talent ==
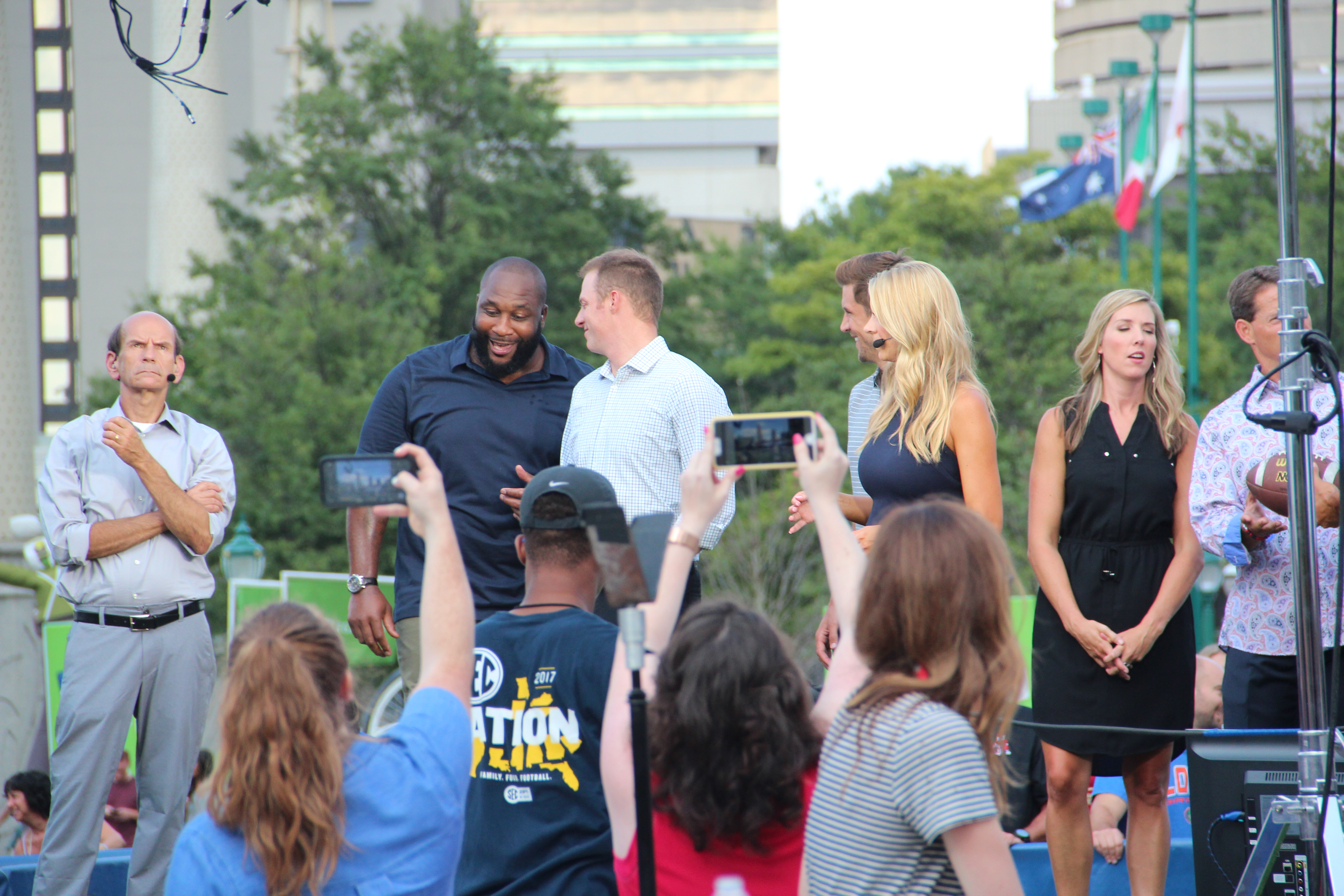
SEC Nation filming at Centennial Olympic Park, 2018

On December 30, 2013, ESPN announced that former University of Florida, Denver Broncos and New York Jets quarterback Tim Tebow had signed a multi-year deal with ESPN to serve as a college football analyst. Tebow also will make appearances on SEC Nation.

On March 12, 2014, ESPN named Brent Musburger and Jesse Palmer as lead game announcers for SEC Network's football telecasts. As a result, Musburger was no longer assigned to Saturday Night Football or post-season bowl games. He remained a commentator for Big 12 basketball games aired on ESPN, and made a one-off return to call the 2014 Iron Bowl game. Musburger left ESPN in 2017 to pursue his new Las Vegas-based sports betting network VSiN, and was replaced on the flagship SEC Saturday Night by the new team of Tom Hart, Jordan Rodgers and Cole Cubelic.

On March 24, 2014, it was announced that former University of Alabama and New York Jets quarterback Greg McElroy was hired as a college football analyst for the SEC Network on a multi-year contract. In August 2016, former Vanderbilt University quarterback Jordan Rodgers (brother of Green Bay Packers quarterback Aaron Rodgers) was hired as a college football analyst.

== Availability ==
AT&T U-verse was announced as the first television provider to agree to carry SEC Network. On January 13, 2014, Sports Business Journal reported that ESPN was seeking a carriage rate of $1.30 per subscriber per month in SEC markets, and $0.25 in non-SEC markets; in comparison, Big Ten Network charges around $1 per subscriber in Big Ten markets. It was also noted that SEC Network's opening doubleheader may have been intended to put pressure on Comcast, Time Warner Cable and Charter Communications to carry the network, as they predominantly involved teams located within their service areas.

In March 2014, Dish Network reached an agreement to carry SEC Network as part of a wider carriage deal with Disney–ABC Television Group for its ABC owned-and-operated stations and cable television networks. On April 30, 2014, Google Fiber was added as a carrier. In June 2014, network head Justin Connolly expressed concern for the lack of carriage deals for SEC Network beyond those with AT&T and Dish Network, and considered the situation to be "alarming." However, he also noted that the network may successfully negotiate more carriage deals closer to its launch.

On July 9, 2014, Cox Communications, whose subscriber base includes four SEC markets, reached an agreement to carry SEC Network. Exact terms were not disclosed. Nine days later, ESPN also reached a deal with Comcast to carry SEC Network; in SEC markets, the provider will pay a carriage rate of $1.40 per-subscriber per month. On July 25, Time Warner Cable and Bright House Networks reached deals to carry SEC Network, followed by Cable One and Wide Open West on August 1. On August 2, 2014, Suddenlink Communications announced that it had reached an agreement to carry the network on the launch date. On August 4, 2014, DirecTV, and C Spire Wireless both announced agreements to carry the network (the latter deal was made through the National Cable Television Cooperative, in which C Spire would provide its Fiber to the Home HDTV subscribers with access to the SEC Network App). These announcements were followed by an agreement with Charter Communications on August 6, 2014. Mediacom reached an agreement to carry the network on August 14, 2014.

With the Mediacom agreement, the two major television providers that did not reach a carriage deal prior to launch were Verizon FiOS and Cablevision. However, on August 21, 2014, Sports Business Daily reported that Verizon FiOS had reached a deal to carry the network in its Texas and Florida service areas (which are within the SEC footprint). Cablevision does not have any markets within the SEC footprint. NASA (whose Johnson and Kennedy Space Centers are well within SEC territory) arranged for the SEC Network to be made available on the International Space Station.

Some of SEC Network's programming is carried on SiriusXM, including The Paul Finebaum Show (which airs on ESPN Xtra), and as part of Sirius XM SEC Radio, which launched in March 2018.

The SEC Network is also carried by both PlayStation Vue and Sling TV. Outside the United States, SEC Network became available in Mexico in 2017.
