= James Pitaro =

American media executive (born 1969)

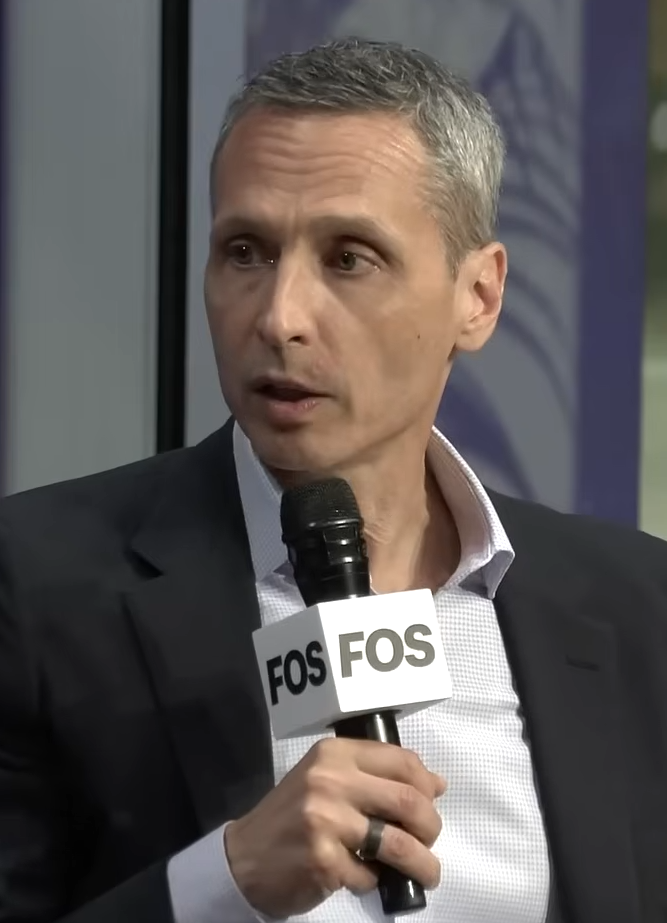
- Pitaro in 2025
- Born: August 2, 1969 (age 57); Westchester County, New York, U.S.
- Education: Cornell University (B.S.); St. John's University School of Law (J.D.)
- Occupation: Media executive
- Employer: The Walt Disney Company via ESPN Inc. including ABC (2018–present)
- Title: Co-chairman, Disney Media Networks; President, ESPN, Inc.
- Spouse: Jean Louisa Kelly (m. 1997)
- Children: 2

James Pitaro (born August 2, 1969) is an American media executive who has been the chairman of ESPN Inc. since 2023. He was president of ESPN from 2018 until his appointment as chairman.

== Early life and education ==
Pitaro was raised in Scarsdale, New York.

He graduated in 1987 from Edgemont Junior – Senior High School in Edgemont, New York.

In 1991, he graduated from Cornell's College of Human Ecology in Ithaca, New York, with a bachelor of science degree in consumer economics and housing. He was a Cornell Big Red football player.

In 1994, he earned his Juris Doctor from St. John's University Law School in Jamaica, Queens.

== Career ==
He previously worked for Yahoo's media division, Wilson Elser Moskowitz Edelman & Dicker in New York and Disney Interactive in Glendale, California.

On March 5, 2018, the Walt Disney Company announced that he would become president of ESPN Inc. including ABC.

On October 12, 2020, he was named chairman of ESPN Sports Content.

On February 9, 2023, he was named chairman of ESPN. Pitaro uses the principle of "Discuss. Debate. Decide. Align." in guiding the teams of employers he leads.

== Personal life ==
He and actress Jean Louisa Kelly have been married since May 24, 1997, and they have two children.
