= ESPN2 =

American pay television network

- Country: United States
- Broadcast area: Nationwide
- Headquarters: ESPN Plaza, 935 Middle Street, Bristol, Connecticut

Programming
- Language: English
- Picture format: 720p (HDTV); Downgraded to letterboxed 480i for the SDTV feed

Ownership
- Owner: The Walt Disney Company (72%; via ABC Inc.); Hearst Communications (18%); National Football League (10%)
- Parent: ESPN
- Sister channels: ABC; ESPN; ESPN DTC; ESPN+; ESPNews; ESPNU; ESPN Deportes; ACC Network; SEC Network; NFL Network; NFL RedZone

History
- Launched: October 1, 1993; 33 years ago

Links
- Website: espn.com

Availability

Streaming media
- WatchESPN or ESPN app: espn.com/watch (U.S. cable subscribers only; requires login from pay television provider to access content)
- DirecTV Stream: Internet protocol television
- YouTube TV: Internet protocol television
- Hulu Live TV: Internet protocol television
- Sling TV: Internet protocol television

ESPN2 is an American multinational pay television network owned by ESPN, a joint venture between the Walt Disney Company (which owns a controlling 72% stake), Hearst Communications (which owns 18%) and the National Football League (which owns 10%).

ESPN2 was initially formatted as a younger-skewing counterpart to its parent network ESPN, with a focus on sports popular among young adult audiences (ranging from mainstream events to other unconventional sports), and carrying a more informal and youthful presentation than the main network. By the late 1990s, this mandate was phased out, as the channel increasingly became a second outlet for ESPN's mainstream sports coverage.

As of December 2023, ESPN2 is available to approximately 70 million pay television households in the United States—down from its 2011 peak of 100 million households.

== History ==
ESPN2 launched on October 1, 1993, at 7:30 p.m. ET. Its inaugural program was the premiere of SportsNight, a sports news program originally hosted by Keith Olbermann and Suzy Kolber; Olbermann opened the show and the channel by jokingly welcoming viewers to "the end of our careers." Launching with an estimated carriage of about 10 million homes, and nicknamed "The Deuce", ESPN2 aimed to be a more informal and youth-oriented channel than parent network ESPN. The youthful image was also reflected in its overall presentation, which featured a graffiti-themed logo and on-air graphics.

Its initial lineup featured studio programs such as SportsNight—which host Keith Olbermann characterized as a "lighter" parallel to ESPN's SportsCenter that would still be "comprehensive, thorough and extremely skeptical", Talk2—a nightly talk show hosted by Jim Rome that was billed as an equivalent to CNN's Larry King Live, Max Out—an extreme sports anthology series carried over from ESPN, and SportsSmash—a five-minute recap of sports headlines which aired every half-hour. ESPN2 also carried several half-hour, sport-specific studio programs under the 2Night banner, such as NFL 2Night, NHL 2Night, and RPM 2Night. Event coverage would focus on coverage of mainstream sports popular within the 18–34 age demographic, such as auto racing, college basketball and NHL hockey (where, beginning in the 1993–94 season, it aired up to five games per week under the title NHL Fire on Ice), while also covering atypical sports such as BMX and other extreme sports.

ESPN2 would also be used to showcase new technology and experimental means of broadcasting events: on September 18, 1994, ESPN2 simulcast CART's Bosch Spark Plug Grand Prix using only onboard camera feeds. In 1995, ESPN2 introduced the "BottomLine", a persistent news ticker which displayed sports news and scores. The BottomLine would later be adopted by ESPN itself and all of its future properties.

In the late 1990s, ESPN2 began to phase out its youth-oriented format, and transitioned to becoming a secondary outlet for ESPN's mainstream sports programming; telecasts began to adopt a more conventional style, and the "graffiti 2" logo was dropped in 2001 in favor of a version of ESPN's main logo. On-screen graphics (such as the BottomLine) used a blue color scheme instead of red to differentiate them from ESPN. Since February 12, 2007, the ESPN2 brand has been used merely to identify the network on-screen via the ticker oron-screen bug, along with program listings, with all programming using the same on-air presentation and ESPN branding as those on the main network.

== Programming ==
Sports events presented on ESPN2 originally tended to be alternative sports such as poker, billiards, lumberjacking, extreme sports and, more recently, drum and bugle corps. However, in recent years ESPN2 has broadcast increasingly more mainstream sporting events, including Major League Baseball games, the East–West Shrine Game, much of the 2006 World Baseball Classic, many Major League Soccer games, NCAA football games, NCAA basketball games, the WNBA, the Arena Football League, regular-season KHL games, and Saturday-afternoon NASCAR Nationwide Series races. In 2011, ESPN2 also acquired broadcast rights to delayed coverage for some American Le Mans Series events, with series' major events airing on ABC. ESPN2 College Football Primetime is a live game presentation of college football on ESPN2. The channel airs the Canadian Football League playoffs, including the season-ending Grey Cup, simulcasting from their Canadian partner TSN.

The channel has also become ESPN's home for tennis coverage. The showpieces are three of the "Grand Slam" tournaments: the Australian Open, Wimbledon and the US Open. U.S.-based tournaments, including the ATP Masters 1000 events at Indian Wells and Miami, as well as the US Open Series, were also previously broadcast on the channel.

Most of ESPN's soccer output has been broadcast on ESPN2, including Major League Soccer, Premier League and La Liga matches; the channel also broadcast the United States' FIFA World Cup qualifiers in 2009. ESPN2 formerly broadcast matches of the UEFA Champions League, until rights for that tournament moved to Fox Soccer and its sister networks. In 2003, ESPN2 began broadcasting Major League Lacrosse games. In March 2007, ESPN2 and the league agreed on a new broadcast contract that ran until the 2016 season.

On October 4, 2017, ESPN announced that it had acquired rights to the Formula One World Championship; the majority of the races are carried by ESPN2.

The NHL returned to ESPN in the 2021–22 season; ESPN2 primarily serves as a secondary broadcaster during the Stanley Cup playoffs.

ESPN2's former flagship show, the morning sports/entertainment program Cold Pizza, achieved minimal success and saw several format and host changes. In January 2006, it was supplanted by the television simulcast of ESPN Radio's Mike and Mike in the Morning (which moved from ESPNews) and moved to a later time slot (10:00 a.m. to 12:00 p.m. Eastern Time). In May 2007, Cold Pizza moved from New York City to the ESPN headquarters in Bristol, Connecticut and was renamed ESPN First Take. After ESPN became part of a new broadcast contract with the association, ESPN2 also premiered the new daily show NASCAR Now (similar to the previous RPM 2Night, except only focusing on NASCAR) in February 2007. Quite Frankly with Stephen A. Smith, a program that featured interviews with popular sports figures, had averaged extremely low ratings, and had also faced several timeslot changes, until it was finally canceled in January 2007.

On August 20, 2019, the ESPNews sports betting studio show Daily Wager (now ESPN Bet Live) was moved to ESPN2.

On August 8, 2018, ESPN2 stunted as "ESPN8: The Ocho"—an homage to a fictitious eighth ESPN channel portrayed in the 2004 film DodgeBall: A True Underdog Story, dedicated to unconventional and obscure sporting events. The event—which also included airings of the original film— was a follow-up to a similar marathon aired by ESPNU the previous year.

=== Simulcasting and alternative telecasts ===
ESPN2 has also simulcast many game telecasts with ESPN, usually as a part of a "Full Circle" or "Megacast" broadcast, which covers a single event across ESPN platforms with different forms of coverage (such as different camera angles and features). ESPN2 also simulcasts some programming from ESPNews, often during local blackouts of scheduled national game telecasts, and for a while provided a simulcast of ESPN Deportes' edition of SportsCenter on Sundays. In return, ESPN2 programming is often seen on ESPN during blackouts of games in certain markets.

ESPN2 also often carries SportsCenter at times when the broadcast on ESPN is delayed by a sporting event that overruns into one of the program's scheduled timeslots. ESPN and ESPN2 also jointly aired two episodes of a documentary special called This is SportsCenter, in which ESPN showed a documentary showing the production of an edition of SportsCenter, while the finished product aired on ESPN2. The documentary would usually air for two hours, where the first hour would cover the preliminary production of the night's show on ESPN, while ESPN2 aired ESPN's regular programming. The second hour usually spent time at production control while covering reaction to the night's developments.

On March 16, 2008, ESPN2 aired CBS-produced coverage of the SEC men's basketball championship game in most of the country. A tornado had damaged the original game site, the Georgia Dome, causing the remainder of the tournament to be rescheduled and re-located to the smaller Alexander Memorial Coliseum. However, the new, later tip-off time for the SEC championship created a scheduling conflict with CBS's coverage of the Big Ten championship game. As a result, CBS aired the SEC championship on its affiliates in the markets of the teams involved, while ESPN2 aired a simulcast of the game in the rest of the country.

ESPN2 has occasionally been used to carry simulcasts of ESPN Deportes' Spanish-language coverage of events, in an effort to promote the channel and improve the availability of the telecasts (as ESPN2 is available in a significantly larger number of homes than ESPN Deportes), while also reducing the need to counterprogram with lesser-viewed programs. Examples since 2016 have included NBA Christmas Day games, the 2017 World Baseball Classic (whose English rights were exclusively held by MLB Network), and an International Champions Cup game between Real Madrid and FC Barcelona. From the 2017 NFL season through 2020, ESPN2 simulcast ESPN Deportes' Spanish-language broadcasts of Monday Night Football during the first nine weeks of the season, including its pre-game show NFL Esta Noche, and ESPN Latin America's SportsCenter from Mexico City after the game. ESPN2 had largely scheduled filler programming against MNF until November, when it begins its Monday-night college basketball coverage.

In the 2021 season, the Spanish simulcast of MNF was replaced with Monday Night Football with Peyton and Eli (colloquially known as the "Manningcast"), which is hosted by Eli and Peyton Manning, and features appearances by other celebrity guests.

== High definition ==
ESPN2 broadcasts in high definition in the 720p resolution format, which was launched in January 2005. In January 2011, the separate ESPN2HD branding began to be phased out, as in May of that year, the channel would shift to using the AFD #10 flag to transmit the channel's standard-definition feed in letterboxed widescreen, mirroring the display of the high-definition feed, with the SD feed eventually phased out to allow downscaling of the HD feed for the standard-definition channel.
