= ESPN =

American broadcast sports network

- Logo used since 1985
- Country: United States
- Broadcast area: Nationwide
- Headquarters: Bristol, Connecticut, U.S.

Programming
- Language: English
- Picture format: 720p (HDTV) (selected matches are upscaled to 2160p 4K UHD broadcasts on selected platforms) (downscaled to letterboxed 480i for the SDTV feed)

Ownership
- Owner: The Walt Disney Company (72%; via ABC Inc.); Hearst Communications (18%); National Football League (10%)
- Parent: ESPN
- Sister channels: ABC; ESPN DTC; ESPN+; ESPN2; ESPNews; ESPNU; ESPN Deportes; ACC Network; SEC Network; NFL Network; NFL RedZone

History
- Launched: September 7, 1979; 47 years ago

Links
- Website: espn.com

Availability

Streaming media
- ESPN+: espn.com/espnplus (American pay-TV subscribers only)
- Service(s): DirecTV Stream, FuboTV, Hulu + Live TV, Sling TV, YouTube TV

ESPN (an initialism of their original name, Entertainment and Sports Programming Network until 1985) is an American basic cable sports broadcasting network and the flagship property of ESPN, LLC, a joint venture of the Walt Disney Company (72% and operational control via indirect subsidiary ABC Inc.), Hearst Communications (18%) and the National Football League (10%). Founded on September 7, 1979, by Bill Rasmussen, Scott Rasmussen, and Ed Eagan, it is widely considered as the biggest sports network, with its title being the "Worldwide Leader in Sports", with a 20% share interest of sports as a rise from previous years. It rules through extended live rights for the NFL, MLB, NBA, and NHL. With college sports, it has its own streaming service.

ESPN broadcasts primarily from studio facilities located in Bristol, Connecticut, and it also operates offices and auxiliary studios in Miami, Orlando, New York City, Las Vegas, Seattle, Charlotte, Washington, D.C., and Los Angeles. James Pitaro has been president since March 5, 2018, following the resignation of John Skipper on December 18, 2017.

As of December 2023, ESPN is available to approximately 70 million pay television households in the United States—down from its 2011 peak of 100 million households. Through ESPN International, it operates regional channels in Africa, Australia, Latin America, and the Netherlands. In Canada, it owns a 20% interest in The Sports Network (TSN) and its five sister networks. Despite the network's success, criticism of ESPN includes accusations of biased coverage.

== History ==
=== Background and launch ===
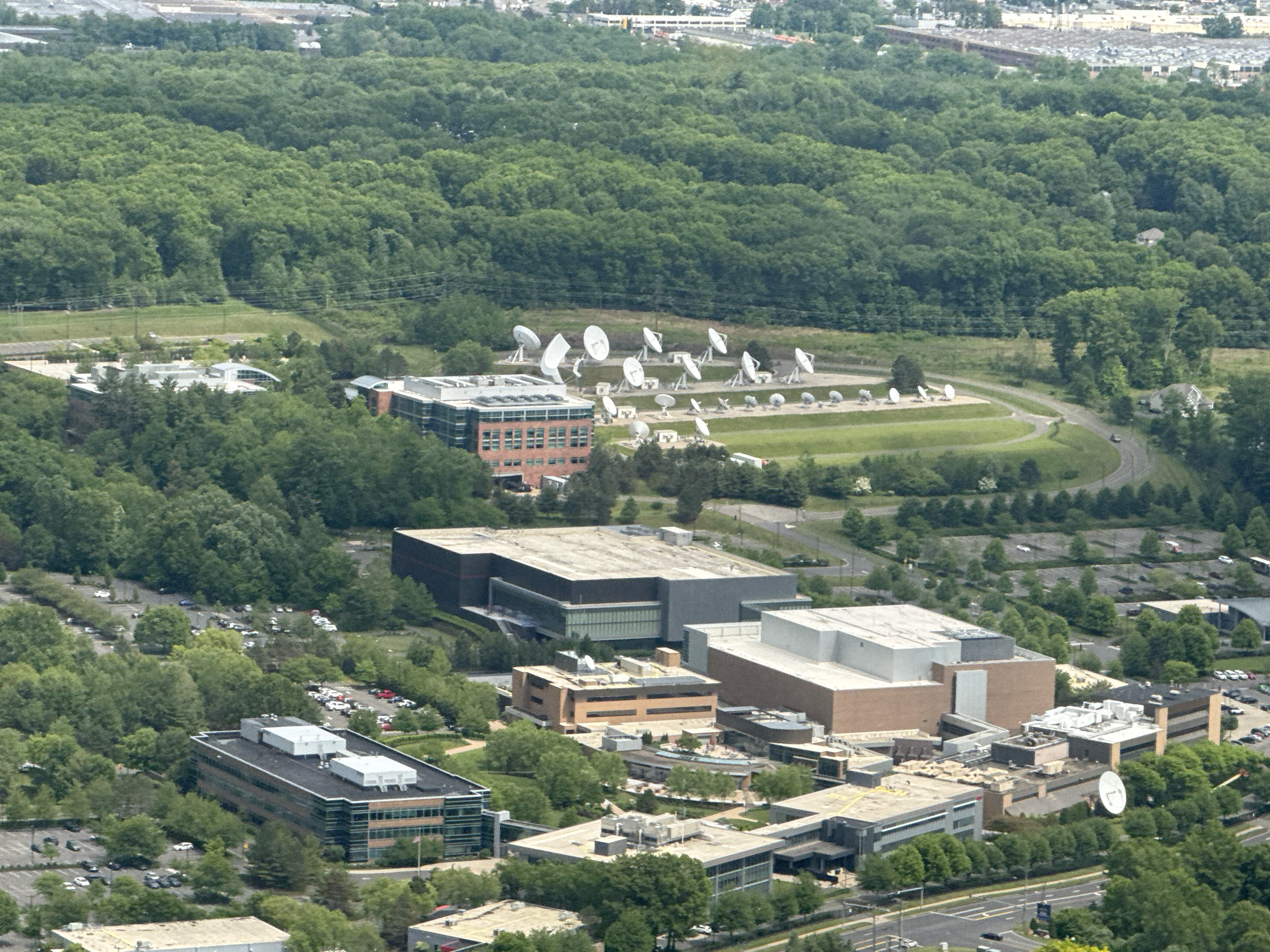
Headquarters in Bristol, Connecticut

Bill Rasmussen came up with the concept of ESPN in May 1978, after he was fired from his job with the World Hockey Association's New England Whalers. Rasmussen and his ESPN co-founder Ed Eagan, joined by Rasmussen's son Scott (who had also been let go by the Whalers), first rented office space in Plainville, Connecticut. However, the plan to base ESPN there was put on hold due to a local ordinance prohibiting buildings from bearing rooftop satellite dishes. Available land to build their own facility was quickly found in Bristol, Connecticut (where the channel remains headquartered), with funding to buy the property provided by Getty Oil, which purchased 85% of the company from Bill Rasmussen on February 22, 1979, in an attempt to diversify the company's holdings. This helped the credibility of the fledgling company; however, there were still many doubters about the viability of their sports channel concept. Another event that helped build ESPN's credibility was securing an advertising agreement with Anheuser-Busch in the spring of 1979; the company invested $1 million to be the "exclusive beer advertised on the network".

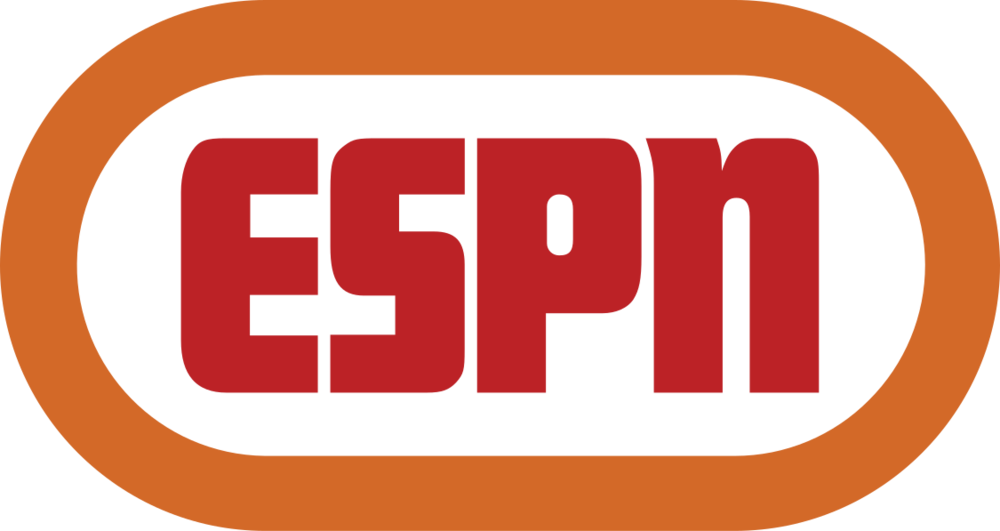
ESPN's first logo, used from 1979 to 1985

ESPN launched on September 7, 1979, beginning with the first telecast of what would become the channel's flagship program, SportsCenter. Taped in front of a small live audience inside the Bristol studios, it was broadcast to 1.4 million cable subscribers throughout the U.S. One month after launch, Chris Berman joined the network; he would continue to be an on-air fixture for decades.

In April 2026, ESPN premiered a documentary, Sports Heaven: The Birth of ESPN, about the network's founding. The documentary tells the story of how Bill and Scott Rasmussen launched the network.

=== 1980s to 2000s ===
ESPN's next big step came when the channel acquired the rights to broadcast coverage of the early rounds of the NCAA Division I men's basketball tournament. It first aired its games in March 1980, helping bring attention to what is now known as "March Madness". The channel's tournament coverage also launched the broadcasting career of Dick Vitale, who, at the time he joined ESPN, had just been fired as head coach of the Detroit Pistons.

In April of that year, ESPN began televising the NFL draft, bringing it to a mass audience and, over time, creating a television "event". That same month, the network began broadcasting Top Rank Boxing, marking the beginning of its involvement with televised professional boxing. The show lasted 16 years, and ESPN has since shown boxing live intermittently with other shows, including Friday Night Fights and others. For a period during the 1980s, the network had boxing tournaments, crowning champions in different boxing weight divisions as "ESPN champions".

The next major stepping stone for ESPN came over a couple of months in 1984. During this period, the American Broadcasting Company (ABC) purchased 100% of ESPN from the Rasmussens and Getty Oil. Under Getty ownership, the channel was unable to compete for the television rights to major sports events contracts as its majority corporate parent would not provide the funding, leading ESPN to lose out for broadcast deals with the National Hockey League (to USA Network) and NCAA Division I college football (to TBS). For years, the National Football League (NFL), National Basketball Association (NBA), and Major League Baseball (MLB) refused to consider cable as a means of broadcasting some of their games. However, with the backing of ABC, ESPN's ability to compete for major sports contracts increased, and gave it credibility within the sports broadcasting industry.

Later that year, the U.S. Supreme Court ruled in NCAA v. Board of Regents of the University of Oklahoma (1984) that the NCAA could no longer monopolize the rights to negotiate the contracts for college football games, allowing each school to negotiate broadcast deals on its own. ESPN took full advantage and began to broadcast a large number of NCAA football games, creating an opportunity for fans to view multiple games each weekend (instead of just one), the same deal the NCAA had previously negotiated with TBS.

ESPN's breakthrough moment occurred in 1987, when it secured a contract with the NFL to broadcast eight games during that year's regular season—all of which aired on Sunday nights, marking the first broadcasts of Sunday NFL primetime games. ESPN's Sunday Night Football games would become the highest-rated NFL telecasts for the next 17 years (before losing the rights to NBC in 2006). The channel's decision to broadcast NFL games on Sunday evenings resulted in a decline in viewership for daytime games shown on the major broadcast networks, marking the first time ESPN was a legitimate competitor to NBC and CBS, which had long dominated the sports television market. Also in 1987, former college football coach Lee Corso joined ESPN. He would go on to host ESPN's College GameDay program for 38 consecutive years.

In 1992, ESPN launched ESPN Radio, a national sports talk radio network providing analysis and commentary programs (including shows such as Mike and Mike in the Morning and The Herd) as well as audio play-by-play of sporting events (including some simulcast with the ESPN television channel).

On October 10, 1993, ESPN2—a secondary channel that originally was programmed with a separate lineup of niche sports (with snowboarding and the World Series of Poker as its headliners) as well as serving as an overflow channel for ESPN—launched on cable systems reaching to 10 million subscribers. It became the fastest-growing cable channel in the U.S. during the 1990s, eventually expanding its national reach to 75 million subscribers.

Ownership of ABC, and thus control of ESPN, was acquired by Capital Cities Communications in 1985. ESPN's parent company renamed themselves as Capital Cities/ABC Inc. Capital Cities/ABC Inc., was then acquired by the Walt Disney Company in 1996 and was re-branded as Walt Disney Television.

=== 2000s ===
Challenges began in the 2000s. ESPN started losing viewers, more than 10 million over a period of several years in the 2010s, even while paying large sums for the broadcast rights to properties like the NFL, NBA and College Football Playoff.

On April 26, 2017, approximately 100 ESPN employees were notified that their positions with the sports network had been terminated—among them athletes-turned-analysts Trent Dilfer and Danny Kanell, and noted journalists like NFL beat reporter Ed Werder and MLB expert Jayson Stark. Further cost-cutting measures included moving the studio operations of ESPNU to Bristol from Charlotte, North Carolina, reducing its longtime MLB studio show Baseball Tonight to Sundays as a lead-in to the primetime game and adding the MLB Network-produced Intentional Talk to ESPN2's daily lineup.

On April 12, 2018, ESPN began a supplemental over-the-top streaming service known as ESPN+.

After having last carried national-televised NHL games in 2004, ESPN and ABC agreed in March 2021 on a seven-year contract to televise games, with some airing on ESPN+ and Hulu. The contract also awarded four of the seven Stanley Cup Finals to both ESPN and ABC. All other nationally televised games would air on TBS and TNT under a separate deal the league struck with Turner Sports the following month.

=== 2020s ===
On August 8, 2023, ESPN and Penn Entertainment announced a deal to rebrand Penn's sportsbooks with ESPN branding. Penn's existing Barstool Sportsbook would become ESPN Bet in late-2023.

On February 6, 2024, ESPN announced a joint venture with Fox Sports and TNT Sports known as Venu Sports, including the three organizations' main linear sports channels and associated media rights. It was originally planned to launch in fall 2024. However, following legal issues (including an antitrust lawsuit by FuboTV), the service was ultimately cancelled.

In May 2025, ESPN announced it would officially launch an ESPN-branded direct-to-consumer product later that year, which would incorporate ESPN's main channels and content from ESPN+, and become the main streaming offering for all ESPN subscribers.

On August 5, 2025, ESPN announced it had reached an agreement to acquire the NFL's Media division, pending regulatory approval. Under the deal, ESPN would get control of the NFL's in-house media properties such as NFL Network, NFL RedZone, and the league's official fantasy football service. The NFL would take a 10% equity stake in ESPN, NFL Network and RedZone would become part of the forthcoming ESPN streaming service, the NFL would license content from NFL Films to air on ESPN networks, and ESPN would reassign selected games from its NFL broadcast package to NFL Network's exclusive game package. The NFL would continue to produce RedZone for ESPN, and the acquisition excluded properties such as NFL Films and NFL+. Regulatory approval was granted in January 2026, with the deal closing on the 31st of that month; NFL Media employees would join ESPN in April of that year.

On August 6, 2025, ESPN announced it had agreed to a five-year deal with WWE to stream WWE live premium events on the forthcoming ESPN streaming service, as well as simulcast select events on ESPN linear channels, starting with Wrestlepalooza in September 2025.

In August 2026, Disney+ and ESPN announced a multi-year agreement with Formula E under which all Formula E races will be available on ESPN and ESPN+ in the United States from the 2026–27 season.

In April 2026, ESPN premiered a documentary, "Sports Heaven: The Birth of ESPN", chronicling the channel's creation. This documentary tells the story of how Bill and Scott Rasmussen launched the network.

In September 2026, ESPN removed the Bottom Line screen tickers from their NCAA Football coverage as a way to create a cleaner presentation that focuses more on the field.

Its founder, Bill Rasmussen, died on August 18, 2026, at the age of 93, at his home in Florida, from complications of Parkinson's disease.

== Programming ==
Alongside its live sports broadcasts, ESPN also airs a variety of sports highlight, talk, and documentary-styled shows. These include:

- College GameDay (basketball) – A weekly college basketball show airing from the Saturday Primetime game of the week site
- College GameDay (football) – A weekly college football preview show airing from the site of a major college football game
- E:60 – An investigative newsmagazine program focusing on American and international sports
- First Take – A daily morning talk show with Stephen A. Smith and Shae Cornette (moved from ESPN2 on January 3, 2017)
- Get Up! – A daily morning show focusing on the previous night's game results and the sports issues of the day
- Monday Night Countdown – A weekly recap show aired on Monday evenings during the NFL season, also serves as the pre-game show for Monday Night Football
- Pardon the Interruption – A daily afternoon talk show where Tony Kornheiser and Michael Wilbon debate an array of sports topics
- SportsCenter – The flagship program of ESPN, a daily sports news program delivering the latest sports news and highlights
- Sunday NFL Countdown – A weekly preview show that airs on Sunday mornings during the NFL season
- The Pat McAfee Show – A daily afternoon talk show with news, opinion, and analysis

Many of ESPN's documentary programs (such as 30 for 30 and Nine for IX) are produced by ESPN Films, a film division created in March 2008 as a restructuring of ESPN Original Entertainment, a programming division that was originally formed in 2001. 30 for 30 started airing in 2009 and continues today. Each episode is through the eyes of a well-known filmmaker and has featured some of the biggest directors in Hollywood. The 30 for 30 film O.J.: Made in America won the Academy Award for Best Documentary Feature in 2017, the first such Oscar for ESPN.

The Ultimate Fighting Championship (UFC) signed a five-year contract with ESPN starting in 2019, in which ESPN would pay $300 million per year for UFC rights to carry 42 live events annually on ESPN and ESPN+.

In March 2019, ESPN announced a new betting-themed daily program, Daily Wager, hosted by the network's gambling analyst Doug Kezirian. The program was ESPN's first regularly scheduled program solely dedicated to gambling-related content. On May 14, 2019, ESPN announced a deal with casino operator Caesars Entertainment to establish an ESPN-branded studio at The LINQ Hotel & Casino in Las Vegas to produce betting-themed content.

To help offset the impact of COVID-19 on its business, Walt Disney CEO Bob Chapek indicated during a 2021 earnings conference that the company would increase its presence in online sports betting, including in partnership with third parties.

In 2023, The Pat McAfee Show moved to ESPN as part of a five-year, $85 million deal. The show replaced the Noon ET airing of SportsCenter and This Just In with Max Kellerman.

In 2025, ESPN released the documentary Not So Fast, My Friend: A Lee Corso Special on August 22, airing on Corso's 90th birthday to celebrate his contributions to broadcasting and college football.

== Related channels ==
=== ESPN on ABC ===
Since September 2, 2006, ESPN has been integrated with the sports division of sister broadcast network ABC, with sports events televised on that network airing under the banner ESPN on ABC; much of ABC's sports coverage since the rebranding has become increasingly limited to secondary coverage of sporting events in which broadcast rights are held by ESPN (such as NBA games, NHL games, and the X Games and its related qualifying events) as well as a limited array of events not broadcast on ESPN (most notably, the NBA Finals).

=== ESPN2 ===
ESPN2 was launched on October 1, 1993. It carried a broad mix of event coverage from conventional sports—including auto racing, college basketball, and NHL hockey—to extreme sports—such as BMX, skateboarding, and motocross. The "ESPN BottomLine", a ticker displaying sports news and scores during all programming that is now used by all of ESPN's networks, originated on ESPN2 in 1995. In the late 1990s, ESPN2 was gradually reformatted to serve as a secondary outlet for ESPN's mainstream sports programming.

=== ESPNews ===
ESPNews is a subscription television network that was launched on November 1, 1996, originally focusing solely on sports news, highlights, and press conferences. Since August 2010, the network has gradually incorporated encores of ESPN's various sports debate and entertainment shows and video simulcasts of ESPN Radio shows, in addition to sports news programming. Since the 2013 cancellation of Highlight Express, programming consists mainly of rebroadcasts of SportsCenter. ESPNews also serves as an overflow feed due to programming conflicts caused by sporting events on the other ESPN networks.

=== ESPN Deportes ===
ESPN Deportes (Spanish pronunciation: [i.es.piˈen deˈpoɾtes], "ESPN Sports") is a subscription television network that was originally launched in July 2001 to provide Spanish simulcasts of certain MLB telecasts from ESPN. It became a 24-hour sports channel in January 2004.

=== ESPNU ===
ESPNU is a subscription television network that launched on March 4, 2005, that focuses on college athletics including basketball, football, baseball, college swimming, and ice hockey.

=== SEC Network ===
SEC Network is a subscription television network that launched on August 14, 2014, focusing on the coverage of sporting events sanctioned by the Southeastern Conference. Created as a result of a 20-year broadcast partnership between the two entities, the network is a joint venture between the conference and ESPN Inc., which operates the network.

=== ACC Network ===
Launched on August 22, 2019, the ACC Network is a subscription television network that focuses on the sporting events of the Atlantic Coast Conference (ACC) as part of an agreement extending to the 2036–37 academic term as a joint venture of network operator ESPN Inc., and the ACC.

=== ESPN8 The Ocho ===
ESPN8 The Ocho is a special program block showcasing seldom-seen obscure sports that airs on the networks of ESPN Inc. The Ocho is also offered as a free ad-supported streaming television (FAST) channel on the Roku Channel, Prime Video, and DirecTV Stream.

=== ESPN+ ===
ESPN+ is an American over-the-top subscription video streaming service available in the U.S., owned by the ESPN division of the Walt Disney Company, in partnership with ESPN Inc. As of August 2025, ESPN+ became part of a new direct-to-consumer service and app with two paid subscription tiers: ESPN Unlimited and ESPN Select.

=== Other services ===
ESPN HD

ESPN launched its high definition simulcast feed, originally branded as ESPNHD, on March 30, 2003, with an Opening Day broadcast of the Texas Rangers and Anaheim Angels. All current ESPN content is broadcast in high definition.

Pardon the Interruption and Around the Horn began airing in HD on September 27, 2010, with the relocation of the production of both shows into the facility housing the Washington, D.C., bureau for ABC News.

ESPN broadcasts HD programming in the 720p resolution format, because ABC executives proposed a progressive scan signal that resolves fluid and high-speed motion in sports better, particularly during slow-motion replays. The network's Digital Center itself natively holds 2160p UHD/4K operations and equipment. In 2011, ESPNHD began to downplay its distinct promotional logo in preparation for the conversion of its standard definition feed from a 4:3 full-screen to a letterboxed format (via the application of the AFD #10 display flag), which occurred on June 1 of that year.

WatchESPN

WatchESPN was a website for desktop computers, as well as an application for smartphones and tablet computers that allowed subscribers of participating pay-TV providers to watch live streams of programming from ESPN and its sister networks (except for ESPN Classic), including most sporting events, on computers, mobile devices, Apple TV, Roku, and Xbox Live via their TV Everywhere login provided by their cable provider. The service launched on October 25, 2010, as ESPN Networks, a streaming service that provided a live stream of ESPN exclusive to Time Warner Cable subscribers. ESPN3, an online streaming service providing live streams and replays of global sports events that launched in 2005 as a separate website, was incorporated into the WatchESPN platform on August 31, 2011. Likewise, ESPN+ was launched in April 2018 as an add-on subscription for $4.99 per month. On June 30, 2019, WatchESPN was discontinued with the service's full merger into the ESPN app.

ESPN Events

ESPN Regional Television (formerly branded as ESPN Plus) is the network's syndication arm, which produces collegiate sporting events for free-to-air television stations throughout the U.S. (primarily those affiliated with networks such as The CW and MyNetworkTV or independent stations). ESPN+ syndicates college football and basketball games from the American Athletic Conference, Big 12 Conference, Mid-American Conference, Metro Atlantic Athletic Conference, Sun Belt Conference and the Western Athletic Conference.

ESPN on Snapchat

ESPN distributes various content on Snapchat Discover, including a Snapchat-only version of SportsCenter. ESPN has also expanded its digital presence across major social media platforms, including Instagram, Facebook, X (formerly Twitter), and TikTok, where it distributes highlights and engages audiences through short-form content. The network has consistently ranked as one of the most engaged sports media brand on social media, generating hundreds of millions of interactions per month across platforms.

ESPN MVP

ESPN MVP (initially known as Mobile ESPN) was a 2005 attempt at operating a mobile virtual network operator with exclusive mobile content, first as a phone feature, then after its termination into a Verizon Wireless paid service. Technologies developed for it have since been transferred to the network's successful mobile strategy in the smartphone era.

=== Former services ===
ESPN Classic

ESPN Classic was a subscription television network that launched in 1995 as Classic Sports Network, founded by Brian Bedol and Steve Greenberg. ESPN Inc., purchased Classic Sports Network in 1997 for $175 million, rebranding the channel as "ESPN Classic" in 1998. The channel broadcast notable archived sporting events (originally including events from earlier decades, but later focusing mainly on events from the 1990s and later), as well as sports documentaries and sports-themed movies. It was discontinued on December 31, 2021.

Longhorn Network

The Longhorn Network was a subscription television network that launched on August 26, 2011, focusing on events from the Texas Longhorns varsity sports teams of the University of Texas at Austin. It features events from the 20 sports sanctioned by the Texas athletic department, along with original programming (including historical, academic and cultural content). It was discontinued on June 30, 2024, a day before the Longhorns' move to the Southeastern Conference.

== International channels ==
ESPN owns and operates regional channels in Brazil, Caribbean, Latin America, Netherlands, Oceania and Sub-Saharan Africa. In Canada, ESPN is a minority owner of The Sports Network (TSN) and the French-language Réseau des sports (RDS). ESPN also has a minority stake in J Sports in Japan.

== ESPN Bet ==
ESPN moved into the sports betting scene in November 2023 with plans to launch their sportsbook app "ESPN Bet" on November 14. In a partnership with Penn Entertainment, ESPN Bet began in 17 states, and featured betting odds from their own sportsbook on their content. A mutual early termination of the agreement, and a new contract awarded to DraftKings commencing December 1, 2025, was announced on November 6, 2025.

== Criticism ==
ESPN has been criticized for focusing too much on men's college and professional sports (particularly the NBA and NFL), and very little on women's sports or extreme sports. Baseball, ice hockey, and soccer fans have also criticized ESPN for not giving their respective sports more coverage. Other criticism has focused on ethnicity in ESPN's varying mediated forms, as well as carriage fees and issues regarding the exportation of ESPN content. Some critics argue that ESPN's success is their ability to provide other enterprise and investigative sports news while competing with other hard sports-news-producing outlets such as Yahoo! Sports and Fox Sports. Some scholars have challenged ESPN's journalistic integrity, calling for an expanded standard of professionalism to prevent biased coverage and conflicts of interest.

On October 8, 2019, Deadspin reported that an internal memo was sent to ESPN employees instructing them to avoid any political discussions regarding the People's Republic of China and Hong Kong in the aftermath of a tweet by Houston Rockets general manager Daryl Morey.

== Awards ==
In 2016, ESPN received the National Hispanic Media Coalition's "Outstanding Commitment and Outreach to the Latino Community" award.

In 2017, ESPN's 30 for 30 documentary film O.J.: Made in America won the Academy Award for Best Documentary Feature, the first such Oscar for ESPN. At that time, it was also the longest film to win an Academy Award, with the miniseries being over seven and a half hours long.

As of 2026, ESPN has won 277 Sports Emmy Awards in 39 years of eligibility. In 2024, ESPN apologized for submitting fake names for Sports Emmy award consideration over many years, and returned 37 trophies that had been awarded to ineligible recipients to the National Academy of Television Arts and Sciences.

In 2026, ESPN received 62 nominations at the Sports Emmys, mare than any other outlet, and took 10 wins.

== See also ==
- List of ESPN personalities
- List of past ESPN personalities
- ESPN on ABC
- ESPN2
- ESPN+
- ESPN Films
- Maxx Zoom
- Wieden+Kennedy

== Bibliography ==
- McGuire, John; Armfield, Greg G.; Earnheardt, Adam C., eds. (2015). The ESPN Effect: The Making of a Sports Media Empire. New York: Peter Lang. ISBN 978-1-4331-2600-0.
- Miller, James Andrew; Shales, Tom (2011). Those Guys Have All the Fun: Inside the World of ESPN. New York: Little, Brown and Company. ISBN 978-0-316-04300-7.
- Vogan, Travis (2015). ESPN: The Making of a Sports Media Empire. Urbana: University of Illinois Press. ISBN 978-0-252-03976-8.
