= Paulina García Robles =

Mexican television presenter, sportscaster, and model

- Born: Paulina García Robles; 26 February 1993 (age 33); Mexico City, Mexico
- Education: Tecnológico de Monterrey, Campus Santa Fe
- Occupations: Television presenter Sportscaster; Model
- Years active: 2013–present

Paulina García Robles (born 26 February 1993) is a Mexican television presenter, sportscaster, and model currently working for ESPN Deportes and ESPN Mexico. García currently anchors the Spanish-language version of SportsCenter.

García won Nuestra Belleza Distrito Federal in 2013 and went on to compete in that year's Nuestra Belleza México where she ranked in the top 10.

García attended the Tecnológico de Monterrey, Campus Santa Fe where she studied communication and digital media and was a member of the volleyball team.

== Career ==
García won first place in English at a national Knowledge Bowl, which earned her an academic scholarship to the Tecnológico de Monterrey, campus Ciudad de Mexico. While at the university, García was nominated for the Borrego de Oro in the Sports category.

García started out her broadcasting career appearing in YouTube clips for Universidad Insurgentes and Across Life, and the pilot of Ni Pio of Televisa Deportes. In February 2015, shortly before her 22nd birthday, García joined the cast of FOROtv morning show Matutino Express.

After few months on Matutino Express she left the show and joined ESPN Mexico in June 2015. She made her debut on the network appearing on morning talk show Toque Inicial on 3 August 2015.

García began her career at ESPN hosting various programs, most notably Toque Inicial where she co-hosted the show with Juan Pablo Fernández. She also did various segments called SportsCenter Ahora, a two-minute review of the most important news of the day. The segments aired between daytime shows on ESPN Mexico and ESPN Deportes, during Raza Deportiva and Jorge Ramos y su Banda on ESPN Deportes as well as online. García was also the social media correspondent of the afternoon edition of Fútbol Picante from February 2016 to August 2017.

In February 2016, García started hosting the show YoRio, a show dedicated to the 2016 Summer Olympics, along with José Ramón Fernández, Alejandro de la Rosa and Tlatoani Carrera. Later that year, García covered her first major sporting event when she was sent by ESPN to cover the 2016 Summer Olympics in Rio de Janeiro.

In August 2017, García left both Toque Inicial (after it was re-branded as Toque) and the afternoon edition of Fútbol Picante to become the presenter of ESPN AM, a new program hosted by Ciro Procuna and Francisco Gabriel de Anda. In September 2017, García also became a permanent anchor of the Spanish-language version of SportsCenter, she had previously been only used as an occasional fill-in.

In July 2018, ESPN sent García to cover the 2018 Central American and Caribbean Games in Barranquilla, Colombia.

In July 2019, García also covered the 2019 Pan American Games in Lima, Peru for ESPN.

== Personal life ==
García loves volleyball, physical training, nutrition and fashion. She remains active in her community by offering online tutoring.
