= Fútbol Picante =

- Created by: Heriberto Murrieta
- Starring: See below
- Country of origin: Mexico

Production
- Production locations: Mexico City, Mexico
- Running time: 60 minutes

Original release
- Network: ESPN Deportes; ESPN 2
- Release: January 7, 2004 – present

Futbol Picante (translation: Spicy Football or Spicy Soccer) is a Mexican sports television show in Spanish which covers mostly Mexican football.

The show is mostly hosted by David Faitelson and José Ramón Fernández; Heriberto Murrieta, Ciro Procuna and Álvaro Morales also serve as hosts when José Ramón Fernández is not present. The show has various analysts ranging from experienced journalists to former footballers.

Fútbol Picante runs for 60 minutes but the actual running time is less due to commercials. The show features a roundtable discussing the day's football headlines and scores along with interviews, reports, and highlights mostly involving Mexican football such as Liga MX and the Mexico national football team but also cover European football leagues and the UEFA Champions League.

Fútbol Picante is one of the most well-known, controversial and most viewed Spanish language sports shows both in the United States and Mexico.

The show is filmed in ESPN's Mexico studios in Mexico City.

In 2018 the show won the Sports Emmy Award for Outstanding Studio Show in Spanish.

== History ==
The show debuted on January 7, 2004, the day ESPN Deportes launched. The very first episode of the show was hosted by Heriberto Murrieta with former footballers Carlos Hermosillo and Carlos Reinoso as analysts. In 2007 and 2008 many well known analysts such as José Ramón Fernández, David Faitelson, Rafael Puente, Carlos Albert and Héctor Huerta joined the show.

In July 2013, a midday edition of the show with a different format started airing weekdays featuring younger journalists. The show was often nicknamed "Fútbol Picante, Jr." by the hosts. The midday edition eventually started featuring all talents by 2016.

For nearly 12 years the show was filmed in ESPN's Mexico original studios in Tlalnepantla de Baz, Mexico. The show along with all of ESPN Mexico's studio shows were moved to ESPN's new studios located in the Jardines del Pedregal neighborhood of Mexico City in January 2016. The first episode filmed in the new studios aired on January 4, 2016 with C.D. Guadalajara owner Jorge Vergara and Guadalajara manager Matías Almeyda as guests.

In August 2018, it was revealed that the podcasts downloads of the show went up 322% in the first half of 2018 compared to the same time in 2017.

== Airings ==
The show airs live everyday of the week, Monday thru Thursday and Saturdays at 12:00am ET/11:00pm CT and Sundays at 8:00pm CT. Due to the airing of Sunday Night Baseball on ESPN Deportes, the show airs on tape delay in the United States on Sundays during the MLB season. The midday edition airs Monday thru Friday at 2:00pm ET/1:00pm CT.

The show airs on ESPN Deportes in the United States and on ESPN2 in Mexico and Central America.

== Personalities ==
=== Analysts ===
- Andrés Agulla (From Bristol)
- Jared Borgetti
- Mario Carrillo
- José Del Valle (From Miami)
- Sergio Dipp
- Dionisio Estrada
- David Faitelson (From San Diego)
- José Ramón Fernández
- Barak Fever (From Bristol)
- Adalberto Franco
- Francisco Gabriel de Anda
- Hérculez Gómez (From Los Angeles)
- Roberto Gómez Junco
- Héctor Huerta
- Jorge Carlos Mercader
- Álvaro Morales
- Heriberto Murrieta
- Mauricio Pedroza (From Los Angeles)
- Hernán Pereyra (From Miami)
- Jorge Pietrasanta
- Ciro Procuna
- Rafael Puente
- Ricardo Puig
- Felipe Ramos Rizo
- Jorge Ramos
- Hugo Sánchez
- José Luis Sánchez Solá
- John Sutcliffe
- Antonio Valle
- Mauricio Ymay

=== Reporters ===
- Martin Ainstein (Madrid correspondent)
- Jesús Bernal (Guadalajara correspondent)
- Tlatoani Carrera
- Odin Ciani
- Marcelino Fernández del Castillo
- León Lecanda
- Moisés Llorens (Barcelona correspondent)
- Manu Martín (Madrid correspondent)
- Daniel Martínez (Italy correspondent)
- Ernaldo Moritz (Guadalajara correspondent)
- Gemma Soler (Barcelona correspondent)
- Héctor Tello (Monterrey correspondent)

=== Former personalities ===
- Carlos Albert
- Luís Roberto Alves "Zague"
- Alejandro Blanco
- Tomás Boy
- Daniel Brailovsky
- Tony Cherchi
- Alejandro de la Rosa
- Juan Carlos Gabriel de Anda
- Ángel García Toraño
- Carlos Hermosillo
- Miguel Herrera
- José Luis Higuera
- Ricardo La Volpe
- Ricardo Peláez
- Rafael Puente, Jr.
- Carlos Reinoso
