= TUDN (brand) =

Sports programming division of Univision Communications

- Network: Univision
- Country of origin: United States
- Owner: TelevisaUnivision
- Key people: Francisco Javier González (president, TUDN); Eric Conrad (Senior Vice President of Programming and Acquisitions, Univision Deportes); Olek Loewenstein (Senior Vice President of Strategy and Operations, Univision Deportes); Victoria Vitarelli (Vice President of Marketing, Univision Deportes); Marco A. Liceaga (Vice President of Marketing and Promotions, Univision Deportes); Wade Davis (CEO, TelevisaUnivision)
- Headquarters: Mexico City, Mexico
- Major broadcasting contracts: Liga MX; CONMEBOL; CONCACAF; UEFA
- Formerly known as: Univision Deportes
- Format: Sports programming
- Official website: www.tudn.com

TUDN (formerly Univision Deportes) is a sports programming division of Univision, a Spanish language broadcast television network owned by TelevisaUnivision, that is responsible for the production of televised coverage of sports events and magazine programs that air on the parent Univision network and sister network UniMás, and cable channels Galavisión and TUDN TV channel. The division's premier sports properties are its broadcast rights to Liga MX, select matches involving the Mexico national football team, tournament matches from the CONCACAF Gold Cup and Copa América. With the closure of the offices in Miami in late August 2024, the division's headquarters are now in Mexico City, Mexico.

== History ==
On May 7, 2019, in conjunction with announcing its partnership with Grupo Televisa, Univision announced that it would rename their Univision Deportes brand to TUDN. The new branding is a combination of abbreviations TDN and UDN, but the first two letters are also pronounced as the Spanish adjective "tu" (your), allowing the name to also be read as "Tu deportes network" ("Your sports network"). TUDN will be promoted as a multi-platform brand, and there will be closer collaboration between the American and Mexican counterparts—allowing for expanded studio programming in the morning and daytime hours (to bolster its expansion into European soccer with its recent acquisition of UEFA rights, and existing content such as Liga MX soccer). The rebranding took place on July 20 with a new slate of content built around live programming. UDN and Univision Deportes Radio were also renamed in line with this rebranding.

== Programs throughout the years ==
=== Current broadcast rights ===
Soccer

- Liga MX (encompassing Univision, UniMás, TUDN and ViX) home matches for the following teams:
  - América
  - Atlas
  - Atlético San Luis
  - Cruz Azul
  - Juárez (only ViX)
  - León
  - Mazatlán
  - Monterrey
  - Necaxa
  - Pachuca
  - Puebla
  - Querétaro
  - Santos Laguna (only ViX)
  - Tijuana
  - Toluca
  - UANL
  - UNAM
- Liga MX Femenil
  - América
  - Cruz Azul
  - Monterrey
  - Toluca
  - UANL
  - UNAM
- Campeón de Campeones
- Mexico national team
- Leagues Cup
- Campeones Cup
- CONCACAF (2012–present)
  - CONCACAF Gold Cup (2000–present)
  - CONCACAF Champions League
  - CONCACAF Nations League
  - CONCACAF Futsal Championship
  - CONCACAF U-20 Championship
  - CONCACAF U-17 Championship
  - CONCACAF Women's U-20 Championship
  - CONCACAF Women's U-17 Championship
- CONMEBOL
  - Copa América (2016, 2021, 2024)
  - Copa América Femenina (2022)
  - CONMEBOL Pre-Olympic Tournament
- UEFA (2018–2028)
  - UEFA Euro 2020 (inc. qualifiers)
  - UEFA Nations League
  - 2022 FIFA World Cup qualification
  - UEFA Youth and Junior Championships (U-21, U-19, and U-17)
  - UEFA Men's (A-team and U-19) and Women's Futsal Championships
  - UEFA Champions League (2018–2027)
  - UEFA Europa League (2018–2027)
  - UEFA Europa Conference League (2021–2027)
  - UEFA Super Cup (2018–2026)
  - UEFA Youth League (2018–2024)
  - Women's Finalissima (2023)

American football

- Super Bowl: 2024: sub-licensed from CBS; 2027: sub-licensed from ESPN/ABC.

Baseball

- Major League Baseball: Tuesday night game

Other programming

- Contacto Deportivo – weeknight sports news program (Univision, 2015–present; UniMás, 2002–2015)
- Fútbol Central – weekly soccer analysis/pre-game show (TUDN, 2012–present; Univision, 2015–present)
- Línea de 4 – In-depth analysis and opinion program of the most important sporting events of the day.
- Misión Europa – The best information about European soccer including Champions League and Europa League.
- Tricolor al Dia – All the latest news on the Mexican national team.
- Faitelson Sin Censura – Hosted by David Faitelson, discusses the most relevant topics on the football agenda without censorship.
- Accion – Recapping and summarizing the best highlights and action from every sport over the week.
- La Jugada – The place to relive the most important events and news of the weekend.
- Sábado Futbolero – Full coverage of the Liga MX matches on Saturday night.

=== Upcoming broadcast rights ===
==== Soccer ====
- Copa Libertadores (2027–2030)
- Copa Sudamericana (2027–2030)

=== Former programs ===
Auto racing

- Formula One (2013–2017; TUDN, UniMas)

Soccer

- FIFA Confederations Cup (1997, 2001, 2003, 2005, 2009 and 2013)
- FIFA World Cup (1970, 1974, 1978, 1982, 1986, 1990, 1994, 1998, 2002, 2006, 2010, 2014)
- FIFA Women's World Cup (1999, 2003, 2007, 2011)
- Ligue 1
- Lamar Hunt U.S. Open Cup (2012–present; TUDN)
- Bundesliga (2017–2020, sub-licensed deal with Fox Deportes)
- A-League
- Major League Soccer (1996-1999, 2007–2022)
  - MLS Cup (1996-1999, 2007–2022)
  - MLS All-Star Game (1996–1999, 2007–2022)
- U.S. men's national soccer team
- U.S. women's national soccer team

Bull riding

- PBR Camping World Team Series (2023–2024)
- PBR Unleash the Beast Series (2024)

==== Other programming ====
- Republica Deportiva (1999–2024)
- Fútbol Club

== Notable personalities ==
=== Present ===
==== Play-by-play ====
- Alfredo Tame
- Antonio de Valdés
- Antonio Gómez Luna
- Antonio Nelli
- Daniel Nohra
- Diana Ballinas
- Eduardo Luna
- Emilio Fernando Alonso
- Enrique Bermúdez
- Felipe Sebastián Muñoz
- Francisco Javier Gonzalez
- Lola del Carril
- Marco Cancino
- Paco Gonzalez
- Pedro Antonio Flores
- Ramon Aranza
- Raúl Pérez

==== Anchors ====
- Alejandro de la Rosa
- Ana Caty Hernández
- Felipe Sebastián Muñoz
- Vanessa Huppenkothen

==== Analysts ====
- Anselmo Alonso
- Angel Garcia Toraño
- Aldo Farias
- Carlos Reinoso
- Carolina Weigend
- Damián Zamogilny
- David Faitelson
- Emanuel Villa
- Enrique Burak
- Francisco Fonseca
- Georgina Gonzalez
- Guillermo Franco
- Guillermo Schutz
- Hugo Salcedo
- Jonathan Orozco
- Manuel Barrera
- Marc Crosas
- María Fernanda Mora
- Miguel Herrera
- Mauricio Ymay
- Miguel Layún
- Oswaldo Sánchez
- Rafael Puente Jr.
- Sara Zetune
- Yleana Davila

==== Field Reporters ====
- Adrian Esparza Oteo
- Alan Lara
- Daniel Velasco
- Diego Armando Medina
- Diego Peña
- Erick López
- Francisco Arredondo
- Gibrán Araige (Mexican men's national soccer team reporter)
- Guadalupe Flores Peña
- Guillermo Zavala
- Hugo Ramirez (European-based reporter)
- Karina Herrera
- Israel Romo
- Javier Rojas
- Juan Carlos Zamora
- Julio Ibanez
- Mafer Alonso (Mexican men's national soccer team reporter)
- Rodrigo Celorio
- Vladimir Garcia
- Zaritzi Sosa

=== Former ===
==== Play-by-play ====
- Andrés Cantor
- Francisco "Paco" Villa (deceased)
- Nicolás Cantor
- Jorge Pérez Navarro
- Jorge Sánchez
- José Hernández
- José Luis López Salido
- Luis Omar Tapia
- Ramsés Sandoval
- Raúl Méndez
- Rodolfo Landeros
- Juan Carlos 'Chiquis' Cruz
- Pablo Ramírez
- Xavi Sol

==== Analysts ====
- Norberto Longo (1970s–2000)
- Jesús Bracamontes
- Diego Balado
- Hristo Stoichkov
- Iván Zamorano
- Marcelo Balboa
- Diego Balado
- André Marín (deceased)

==== Studio hosts ====
- Fernando Fiore
- Iván Kasanzew (nicknamed "El Conde K")
- Lucía Villalón
- Rosana Franco
- Tony Cherchi
- Adriana Monsalve
- Lindsay Casinelli
- Alejandro Berry
- Valeria Marín

== Presidents ==
- Alexander "Sandy" Brown (2011–2012)
- Juan Carlos Rodríguez (2012–2022)
- Olek Loewenstein (2022–Present)

== Related properties ==
=== Television channel ===
TUDN (formerly known as Univision Deportes Network) is a digital cable and satellite channel that was launched by Univision Communications on April 7, 2012; the network mainly broadcasts soccer events (from leagues such as Liga MX (through individual teams rights held by the division), the CONCACAF Champions League and Major League Soccer); related news, analysis and documentary programming (such as its flagship sports news program Univision Deportes Fútbol Club and Univision Deportes Extra); and shows originated by the Mexican counterpart channel through Univision's longstanding programming agreement with Televisa.

During its times as UDN, it previously operated a secondary channel, Univision Deportes Network 2, which carried additional sports content including rebroadcasts of sports events originally seen on its parent network and studio programming; Univision Deportes Network 2, which was exclusive to Dish Network and created through a carriage agreement with the satellite provider struck in January 2012, ceased operations in 2014.

=== TUDN Radio ===
TUDN Radio (formerly Univision Deportes Radio) is a Spanish language sports radio network with a main focus on soccer. It was launched on April 19, 2017 on 10 Univision owned-and-operated stations previously affiliated with Univision America.

== See also ==
- Sports broadcasting contracts in the United States
