= Pilar Pérez (TV host) =

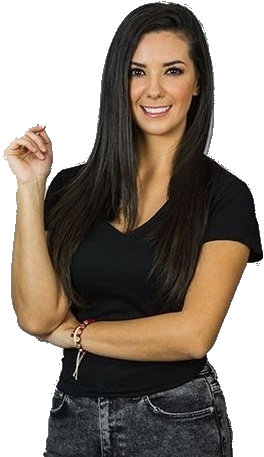
- Born: Pilar Pérez Reyes; February 20, 1986 (age 40); Culiacán, Sinaloa, Mexico
- Occupations: TV Host, Journalist, model, and former beauty queen
- Years active: 2006–present

Pilar Pérez Reyes (born February 20, 1986 in Culiacan, Sinaloa) is a Mexican TV host, journalist, model and former beauty pageant titleholder.

== Career ==
Pilar was born in Culiacan, Sinaloa but she moved to León, Guanajuato at an early age. As a beauty pageant contestant she was crowned Miss Guanajuato in 2006. This gave her the right to participate in Nuestra Belleza México 2006.

She first started in television in 2010 by hosting several TV shows for Fox Deportes in Mexico. She hosted Central Fox from 2011 to 2016.

In 2016 she joined ESPN Deportes which made her move from Mexico City to Los Angeles. She hosted Nación ESPN from 2016 to 2018 alongside David Faitelson and Mauricio Pedroza.

After Nacion ESPN got cancelled she hosted the Spanish version of SportsCenter. In 2019 she joined the cast of Ahora o Nunca alongside Herculez Gomez. This made her move again this time from Los Angeles to Miami.

Pilar appears frequently on the Jorge Ramos y su banda TV show and participates in other ESPN Deportes events.

In 2021 at the 42nd Sports Emmy Awards, Pilar won the Sports Emmy Award for Outstanding On-Air Personality in Spanish for her work with ESPN Deportes.

== Personal life ==
Pilar is a fan of Club León from the Liga MX. Pilar is the sister of Omar Pérez Reyes, a Mexican actor and television host better known by his stage name "Faisy".

Awards and achievements
Preceded by Fernanda Verdin Martínez	Nuestra Belleza Guanajuato; 2006	Succeeded by Elisa Nájera
