= Tomás Boy =

Mexican footballer and manager (1951–2022)

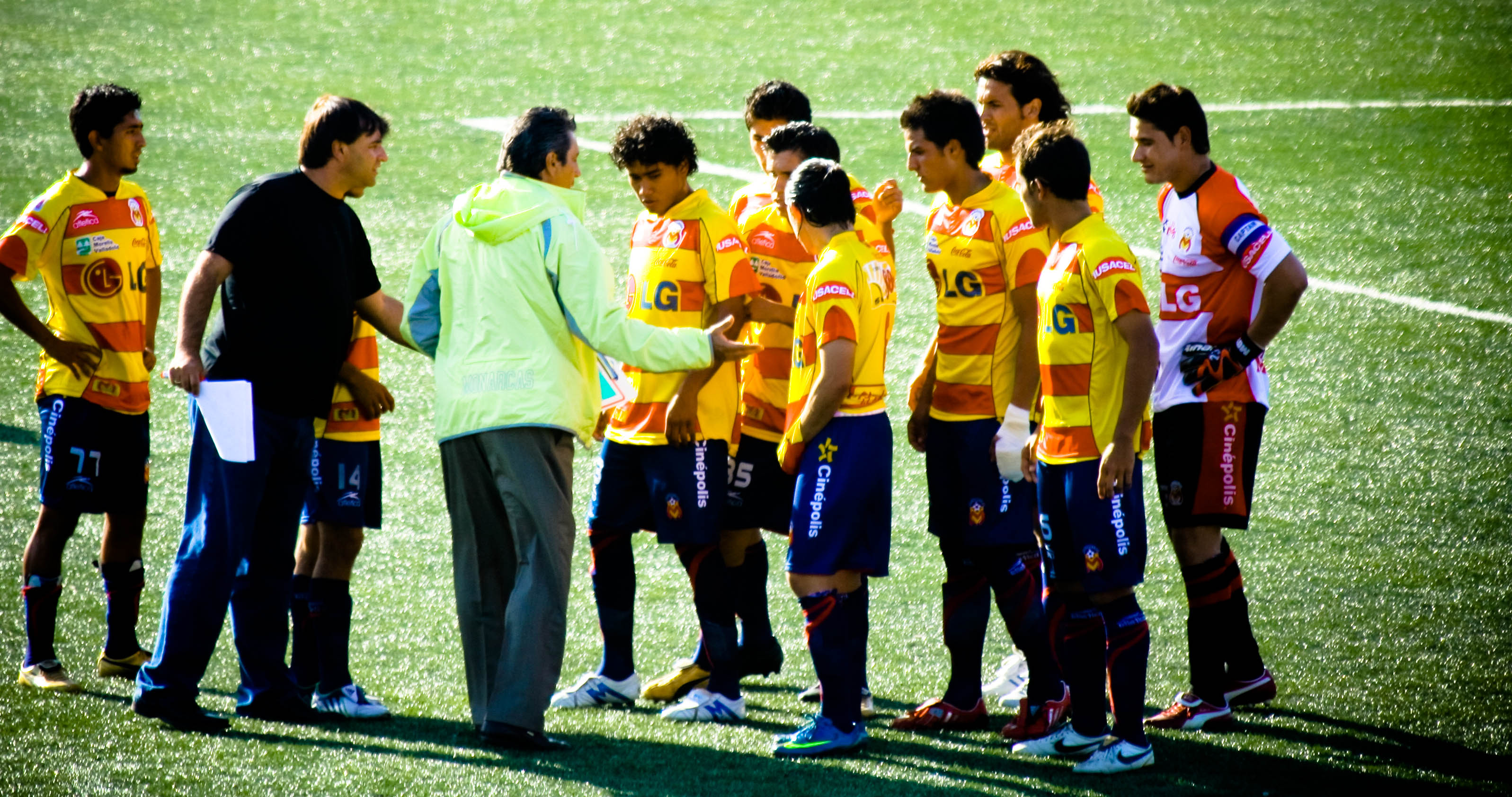
- Boy in 2009

Personal information
- Full name: Tomás Juan Boy Espinoza
- Date of birth: 28 June 1951
- Place of birth: Mexico City, Mexico
- Date of death: 8 March 2022 (aged 70)
- Place of death: Acapulco, Mexico
- Height: 1.80 m (5 ft 11 in)
- Position: Attacking midfielder

Senior career*
Years	Team	Apps	(Gls)
1971–1974	Atlético Español		
1974–1975	Atletico Potosino		
1975–1988	Tigres UANL	413	(98)
1988	San Jose Earthquakes		

International career
1979–1987	Mexico	52	(9)

Managerial career
- 1988: San Jose Earthquakes
- 1989–1990: Tampico Madero
- 1991–1993: Queretaro
- 1995–1996: Veracruz
- 1996–1997: Morelia
- 1997–1998: Monterrey
- 1998–2000: Morelia
- 2002: Puebla
- 2004: Veracruz
- 2007: Atlas
- 2009–2012: Morelia
- 2012–2013: Atlas
- 2014–2015: Atlas
- 2015–2016: Cruz Azul
- 2019: Guadalajara
- 2020–2021: Mazatlán
- * Club domestic league appearances and goals

Tomás Juan Boy Espinoza (28 June 1951 – 8 March 2022) was a Mexican professional manager and footballer who played as an attacking midfielder.

Known for his technical skills and field vision, Boy is considered as one of the greatest Mexican players of all time. He played in the Mexican professional football League, now Liga MX, between 1975 and 1988, and is arguably the best Mexican attacking midfielder of the late 1970s to mid-1980s. He spent most of his entire football playing career with Tigres UANL, appearing in 413 games and scoring 104 goals in all competitions.

Boy was awarded the Mexican Balón de Oro for the best attacking midfielder of the 1978–79 season. He played with the Mexico national team between 1979 and 1987 being named captain during the 1986 World Cup and surprisingly being left out for the 1978 edition. The 1986 squad is the last one ever to reach quarter-finals in a World Cup and was one of the greatest Mexican national squads. Boy earned the nickname "El Jefe" ("The Boss" in Spanish). On 12 November 2019, he was inducted into the Football Hall of Fame in Pachuca.

Boy managed ten different teams in Mexico, reaching a final with Morelia in 2011 and saving several teams from relegation.

== Early life ==
Boy was born in La Condesa and raised in Bosques de Echegaray, a Naucalpan suburb, both in Mexico City into a middle class Catholic family. He is the eldest of eight children. Boy has acknowledged that his relationship with his father, an accountant, was difficult and even violent. Encouraged by his mother, Boy left the house at seventeen to pursue a professional football career. About his personal life in his playing years, he stated that he was "more of a bohemian" that "liked to live". Boy is of German and Italian descent.

== Club career ==
Boy started his career in the Atlético Español in the 1971–72 season. After three years at Atlético Español, Boy went to Atletico Potosino. Boy moved to Tigres UANL in 1975 where he made his professional debut on 2 March 1976 against Club América in a 1–0 loss.

Boy scored his first professional goal on 27 December 1975 in a 3–1 win against C.D. Guadalajara. Boy appeared in 36 matches (started 35) in the 1975–76 season.

In the 1976–77 season Boy had another well performed season, Boy appeared in 33 games and scored eight goals. Although Boy had a good season, Tigres lost to Zacatepec in the 1977 playoffs.

The following season Boy and Tigres had a good season. Boy appearing in 33 games and scoring six goals helped Tigres qualify to the 1978 playoffs. Boy scored two goals in Tigres six post season games, Boy helped Tigres win the 1977–78 title when Tigres defeated UNAM Pumas 3–1 in aggregate score. Boy appeared in 37 matches and scored ten goals in the 1978–79 season, helping Tigres make the playoffs again.

The following season Boy appeared in 31 games, he scored six goals but got three red cards. Boy appeared in eight games in the 1979 post season scoring one goal in the first match against América. Tigres eventually ended up losing to Cruz Azul in the 1980 final in a 4–3 aggregate score. Boy had his best season statistically in 1980–81, scoring 15 goals in 38 matches. Although Boy had a good season, Tigres did not make the 1981 playoffs.

The 1981–82 season did not start well for Boy, Boy missed the first eleven games of the season due to an injury. Although Boy missed 18 games, Tigres had a good season reaching the final. Tigres eventually defeated Atlante 6–2 in penalty kicks at Estadio Azteca, to win their second league title. In the 1982–83 season, Boy missed the first two games but came back against Monterrey in the third match. Boy appeared in 32 matches and scored seven goals but Tigres did not reach the playoffs. The following season, Boy and Tigres had a good season. Boy scored ten goals in 30 matches, this was the third time in his career that Boy scored in double digits. Boy and Tigres reached the playoffs but were eliminated in the first round by UNAM. In the 1984–85 season, Boy missed the first two games of the season but came back in the third match against Cruz Azul. Boy scored nine games in 31 matches but Tigres did not make the playoffs. Since the FIFA World Cup was in Mexico in 1986, there was no season in 1985–86 for Boy due to his national team duty. Following the 1986 FIFA World Cup, Boy and Tigres started the 1986–87 season with only one point in the first five matches.

Eventually Tigres started to get points and made the playoffs but were eliminated in the first round by Morelia in a 4–3 aggregate score. Boy appeared in 35 matches, his most since the 1980–81 season, and scored nine goals. In 1987–88, Boy was injured most of the season and only appeared in 24 matches and scored five goals, his least since 1975–76. Boy retired after the season with 104 goals in 413 matches in his career. In 1988, he then played for the San Jose Earthquakes of the Western Soccer Alliance. He was a First Team All Star that season.

== International career ==
Towards the end of the 1970s, Boy was considered one of the top Mexican players, so Mexico national team coach José Antonio Roca's decision not to call him up for the 1978 FIFA World Cup surprised the media and the audience. Boy made his international debut in a friendly match against the Soviet Union, which Mexico won 1–0 with a goal by Hugo Sánchez. He scored his first international goal on August 24, 1984, in a friendly match against Hungary in Budapest, Hungary. In 1985 Boy made his most appearances and goals with Mexico, appearing in 20 matches and scoring seven goals.

After being called up for the 1986 FIFA World Cup, Boy made his World Cup debut against Belgium. He played 90 minutes with Mexico winning 2–1 with goals by Fernando Quirarte and Hugo Sánchez. In the second match against Paraguay, he started the match but was substituted in the 58th minute by Miguel España. Mexico drew with Paraguay 1–1 with Luis Flores scoring Mexico's only goal. In the third match against Iraq he played the full 90 minutes, Mexico won 1–0 with a goal by Fernando Quirarte. After winning their group Mexico faced Bulgaria in the Round of 16. Boy played 80 minutes until he was substituted by Carlos de los Cobos. Mexico won the match with goals by Manuel Negrete and Raúl Servín. Mexico faced West Germany in the quarterfinals, Boy was substituted by Carlos de los Cobos again this time in the 32nd minute. Mexico eventually fell to West Germany in penalty kicks after going scoreless in 120 minutes.

== Style of play and legacy ==
Boy played as a forward in his youth career, despite coaches who wanted to deploy him in defensive positions. He stated that his main influence as a footballer was Pelé. Developed into an attacking midfielder, most of his career in Tigres he functioned as an offensive-midfield playmaker, playing as a winger occasionally. On the Mexico national team, Boy played as a classic number 10. A right-footed set-piece specialist with a thin physique, he was renowned for his ball control, vision and his ability to set the pace in midfield and provide through-balls and assists for his teammates with both legs. Boy is considered by specialist as one of the greatest Mexican footballers ever. After his death, journalist José Ramón Fernández, ranked him as the third best Mexican footballer of all time, below Hugo Sánchez and Rafael Márquez. In 2018, while broadcasting the 2018 FIFA World Cup in Russia, Fernández also compared Boy with Italian icon Roberto Baggio. In the same broadcast, David Faitelson and Jorge Ramos compared him with Zico. About his style, Boy once stated "I had the style of Zidane, but I was faster."

"[...] let's leave Hugo Sánchez, Rafa Márquez and Chicharito Hernández out of the equation, the best, but they never had those characteristics [...] (Boy) should be listed powerfully in this list of the best, the most complete, the most intelligent, the fittest, the most exquisite Mexican footballer of all time [...]"

— David Faitelson
Pachuca's Football Hall of Fame, 2019

Former Mexico's coach Miguel Herrera stated that Tomás Boy "as a player, he is one of the greatest my eyes have ever seen."Ricardo La Volpe wrote that Boy was a "spectacular midfielder in that time, an already modern player" and listed him in his historical ideal eleven of the Mexican League. After Tigres' first League championship, he received offers to emigrate to Italian Serie A but declined due to family issues. In 2019, Boy said that in his playing years he received a big plaque from the fans of the Estadio Universitario as he scored "the goal of the century, they call it, like Maradona's, but he dribbled four (players), I dribbled eight."

Considered by many as the greatest Tigres' player, he was the top goal scorer with 104 goals in over 13 years until French international striker André-Pierre Gignac broke his record in August 2019. The historical Chilean midfielder Carlos Reinoso stated that "Tomás Boy is the greatest of (Tigres') history, a playmaker with goal." In addition to his footballing skills, he was known for his strong temper and leadership, in Mexico he earned the nickname of El Jefe (Spanish for "The Boss"). Boy was named captain of Mexico during the 1986 FIFA World Cup, over Real Madrid's star Hugo Sánchez.

== Managerial career ==
=== Beginnings and playoffs ===
In 1988, the San Jose Earthquakes of the Western Soccer Alliance replaced head coach Barney Boyce with Boy. Boy lasted only a handful of games before being fired himself. Two years after retiring Tampico Madero signed Boy as their head coach in the thirteenth game of the season replacing Hugo Fernández. Boy debuted with a loss to Correcaminos 1–0 and after 26 matches Boy won seven drew eight and lost 11 matches. In the 1991–92 season Boy was signed as Querétaro head coach in the 21st match. After winning 6, drawing five and losing seven, Boy came back for the following season. In the first 29 matches of the 1992–93 season, Boy had eight wins, six draws, and fifteen losses. Boy was sacked and was replaced by Manuel Cerda. After three years without coaching, Boy was assigned as the new manager of Veracruz in the fifth game of the season. After winning 48 percent of the matches, Veracruz qualified to the playoffs. In the first round Veracruz faced Atlas, Veracruz won by away goals, with the aggregate score being 3–3. Veracruz faced Celaya in the second round, Veracruz were defeated by Celaya with a 6–0 aggregate score.

After not coming back as Veracruz coach for the Invierno 1996 season, Boy did not stay out of a job for long, he was hired as Morelia coach by the fifth match of the season. In thirteen matches, Boys' team won three matches, drew two, and lost eight. Morelia won five, drew seven and lost five in the Verano 1997 season and made a two-game playoff to qualify to the final phase. In the two game playoff, Morelia faced Tecos, Morelia won 4–2 in aggregate.

In the quarterfinals Morelia faced América with América having home field advantage. Morelia defeated América 1–0 at Estadio Morelos and 3–1 at Estadio Azteca. Morelia advanced to the semifinals to face Guadalajara. At Estadio Morelos, Morelia defeated Guadalajara 1–0 in the first leg. In the second leg, Guadalajara defeated Morelia 1–0 at Estadio Jalisco, Guadalajara advanced to the final because they were the higher seed.

After a successful season with Morelia, Boy was hired as Monterrey new manager. At Monterrey, Boys' team only won six matches, with four draws and seven losses Monterrey missed the playoffs. Boys' second season in Monterrey was similar to the previous, Monterrey won four matches, drew six and lost seven. Boy did not return to Monterrey and eventually returned to Morelia where he stayed for four tournaments. Morelia was eliminated in the first round of all four tournaments that Boy was manager, from Invierno1998 to Verano 2000. Two years after Boy left Morelia he was hired as Puebla manager.

Boy was let go after just managing to win one match out of thirteen. Boy was hired before the eleventh week of the Clausura 2004 season by Veracruz. After winning three, drawing one, and losing five, Boy was not brought back for the Apertura 2005. Two and a half years after leaving Veracruz, Boy was hired by Atlas as their interim manager. Even though Boy had a 43 percent winning percentage in eight matches, he was not brought back for the Clausura 2008. After Morelia fired Luis Fernando Tena on 19 February 2009, Boy was hired the next day as their new manager. Although missing the playoffs, Boy had a successful season with Morelia, he was signed to a one-year extension.

=== Runner-up with Morelia ===
In the Clausura 2011, Boy led Morelia to the Liguilla where Monarcas beat América in quarterfinals winning both home and away legs. In the semifinals they played against Cruz Azul, Morelia lost the first leg 2–0 away in the Estadio Azul. In the second leg at the Estadio Morelos, they beat Cruz Azul 3–0 to advance to his first Primera División final. Boy was suspended for five matches, including both final legs due to entering the field without authorization after a fan entered into the pitch and a fight broke out between Cruz Azul and Morelia players. In the final, Monarcas played against UNAM, in the first leg in Morelia, the teams drew 1–1, and in the second leg in Mexico City, UNAM beat Morelia 2–1 to win championship 3–2 on aggregate.

After a 2011–2012 season where Morelia reached semifinals in the Apertura season and quarterfinals in the Clausura season, Boy resigned his position. After his tenure with Morelia, Boy served as an analyst for ESPN Mexico show Fútbol Picante and soccer matches but he left shortly when he was hired as Atlas manager for the second time in his career. Boy was unable to give Atlas a victory and ended 17th in the relegation table with 12 points, 5 over Querétaro.

=== Saving Atlas from relegation, failure with Cruz Azul and Guadalajara ===
For Clausura 2013, Atlas would start their relegation fight once again. The media practically put Atlas as the team that would get relegated. In the Jornada 1 they started with a 1–1 draw vs Pumas UNAM. They then won at home 2–0 against Pachuca. The defeat vs the leader Tigres gave Querétaro some hope. In the Jornada 4 Tomas Boys' team played their best game of the season vs the new leader which was undefeated at the moment. In half time they were down 0–1 in the 2nd half with a goal from Rodrigo Millar and Omar Bravo, they would win the game and end America's undefeated streak. A 2–2 draw vs San Luis F.C. would be enough to stay in the Liga MX and practically send Queretaro F.C. to Ascenso MX. He left the team after the liguilla game against Santos Laguna. Atlas lost three games (one in away games against Tigres, and two in home against Santos Laguna and León) and having along with Santos Laguna the best defense in the tournament by allowing only 13 goals. This saved Atlas from relegation and pushed them to the Liguilla for the first time in six years after ending in the third position with 32 points. After the season Boy left the team and returned to Fútbol Picante as an analyst.

After a poor season that Atlas had with Omar Asad, Grupo Salinas purchased Atlas to save them from their financial problems, they would hire Tomas once again to save the team once again from relegation this time against Atlante. In the 2015 Copa Libertadores, Boy led Atlas to defeat Atletico Mineiro in Belo Horizonte by 0–1, breaking the Brazilians' 37-year unbeaten streak in home games in that competition. On 18 May 2015, Boy was released from his contract after losing to Guadalajara 4-1 the day before on the Liga MX quarter-finals.

On 2 October 2015, Cruz Azul announced Boy as new coach. On 22 October 2016, after the 14th game of the Apertura 2016 season, Boy resigned after being defeated by Puebla in the Estadio Azul by 1–2, leaving Cruz Azul in the 12th position of the table and with few chances of qualifying to playoffs. Boy coached Cruz Azul in three tournaments and in none managed to accede to playoffs.

On 10 April 2019, Boy was appointed new coach of C.D. Guadalajara. After negative results, Boy was fired on 26 September 2019.

=== Mazatlán FC ===
On October 6, 2020, Boy was hired by Mazatlán FC as head coach. On 4 May 2021, the team's president announced that Boy would not continue as head coach.

== Personal life ==
Boy and his former wife Rosa had three sons: Andrés, who works as football analyst for Televisa Monterrey, Luis and Claudio, the last worked with him as assistant manager and is named after his late friend Claudio Lostanau. He lived most of the time in Mexico City and Acapulco.

Boy was an avid golfer and a fan of MotoGP being Valentino Rossi his favorite racer. He was a fan of singer Elvis Presley and liked classical music such as Chopin. Boy mentioned The Art of War of Sun Tzu as his favorite book.

== Death ==
On 4 March 2022, Boy was hospitalized due to a pulmonary thromboembolism in Acapulco. He died from complications of his condition on March 8, 2022, at the age of 70. A private funeral service was held at the French cemetery in Mexico City the next day. His death was widely covered by Mexican sports media.

== Career statistics ==
=== Club ===
Appearances and goals by club, season and competition
Club	Season	League			Cup		Total	
Club	Season	Division	Apps	Goals	Apps	Goals	Apps	Goals
Tigres UANL	1975–76	Primera División	36	4	?	2	36	6
Tigres UANL	1976–77	Primera División	33	8			35	4
Tigres UANL	1977–78	Primera División	39	9			39	9
Tigres UANL	1978–79	Primera División	43	11			43	11
Tigres UANL	1979–80	Primera División	39	7			39	7
Tigres UANL	1980–81	Primera División	38	15			38	15
Tigres UANL	1981–82	Primera División	26	6			26	6
Tigres UANL	1982–83	Primera División	32	7			32	7
Tigres UANL	1983–84	Primera División	30	10			30	10
Tigres UANL	1984–85	Primera División	31	9			31	9
Tigres UANL	1985–86	Primera División	0	0			0	0
Tigres UANL	1986–87	Primera División	35	9			35	9
Tigres UANL	1987–88	Primera División	24	3			24	3
Career total			413	98	?	2	413	100

=== International ===
Scores and results list Mexico's goal tally first, score column indicates score after each Boy goal.

List of international goals scored by Tomás Boy
No.	Date	Venue	Opponent	Score	Result	Competition
1	August 25, 1984	Népstadion, Budapest, Hungary	Hungary	2–0	2–0	Friendly
2	October 9, 1984	Los Angeles Memorial Coliseum, Los Angeles, United States	Colombia	1–0	1–0	Friendly
3	February 5, 1985	Estadio Corregidora, Querétaro, Mexico	Poland	1–0	5–0	Friendly
4	August 27, 1985	Los Angeles Memorial Coliseum, Los Angeles, United States	Bulgaria	1–1	1–1	Friendly
5	October 22, 1985	Sharjah Stadium, Sharjah, United Arab Emirates	United Arab Emirates	2–1	2–2	Friendly
6	November 14, 1985	Los Angeles Memorial Coliseum, Los Angeles, United States	Argentina	1–1	1–1	Friendly
7	December 7, 1985	Estadio Azteca, Mexico City, Mexico	Algeria	2–0	2–0	1986 Mexico Cup
8	December 10, 1985	Estadio Jalisco, Guadalajara, Mexico	South Korea	1–1	2–1	1986 Mexico Cup
9	December 14, 1985	Estadio Nemesio Díez, Toluca, Mexico	Hungary	2–0	2–0	1986 Mexico Cup

== Honours ==
=== Player ===
Tigres UANL

- Mexican Primera División: 1977–78, 1981–82
- Copa México: 1975–76

=== Manager ===
Morelia

- North American SuperLiga: 2010
- Mexican Primera División: Clausura 2011 runner-up
