= Rosana Franco =

Mexican news person

- Born: March 1, 1970 (age 56); Monterrey, Nuevo León, Mexico
- Education: Universidad Regiomontana
- Known for: news person, sportscaster

Rosana Franco (born March 1, 1970) is a Mexican news person, as well as a sportscaster for Spanish-language television channel ESPN Deportes.

== Early years ==
Franco was born in Monterrey, Nuevo León. Her father, Roberto Vazquez, was also a soccer player, who played for the UNAM Pumas team.

Franco as a small girl was interested in track and field and gymnastics. Her sports interests later included basketball. According to her, she also played baseball on the streets.

She graduated from Communications in Monterrey's Universidad Regiomontana.

== Career ==
Rosana Franco entered the world of acting, participating as an actress in various Mexican films and commercials, but soon, she would begin to miss being involved in sports.

In 1998, Univision held auditions in three cities, including Guadalajara, to find a team of commentators for their weekly sports show, Republica Deportiva. Franco auditioned, and she was chosen, out of 500 people, to conduct the show, alongside Fernando Fiore and Jorge Gomez. She has said that she wants to use her position to champion women's rights. As part of Republica Deportiva, Franco reported on Primer Impacto's sports section. She no longer appears on Republica Deportiva.

In April 2012, Franco was fired from Univision along with various other employees.

In October 2013, Franco was hired by Spanish sports network ESPN Deportes. Franco appears on the morning sports show Raza Deportiva along with Omar Orlando Salazar, Leo Vega, David Faitelson, Rafael Ramos and Oscar Restrepo, the show also airs simultaneously on ESPN Deportes Radio. Franco also appears on the sports talk show #Redes along with Carolina Guillén, Alfredo Lomeli and Poncho Vera.

== Personal life ==
Franco has a son, born in 1990.
