= Toque Inicial =

- Presented by: Juan Pablo Fernández; Paulina García Robles
- Starring: Eitan Benezra; Álvaro Morales; Antonio Valle
- Country of origin: Mexico

Production
- Production locations: Mexico City, Mexico
- Running time: 120 minutes

Original release
- Network: ESPN; ESPN Deportes
- Release: August 20, 2012 – March 20, 2020

Toque Inicial was a Mexican morning sports-talk television show hosted by Juan Pablo Fernández, Paulina García Robles and various ESPN Mexico personalities. The show airs on ESPN in Mexico and ESPN Deportes in the United States.

The program presents the most relevant news in a relaxed way and with humor and personality that highlight the show's sports news. The show has several segments, showing the humorous side of the news with a touch of sarcasm, parody and irony. The show is generally aimed towards the younger audience.

The show aired Monday thru Friday at 8:00am in Mexico and 9:00am ET in the United States. The show's running time is two hours with only the first hour of the show airing on ESPN Deportes due to Raza Deportiva airing at 10:00am ET. A special night edition of the show aired each Thursday at 8:00pm in Mexico.

The show was filmed in the ESPN Mexico studios in Mexico City.

== History ==
The show was ESPN Mexico first morning show. The show premiered on Monday, August 20, 2012, and it was originally hosted by Poncho Vera and Juan Pablo Fernández. The following year, Kary Correa became the first woman to join the show, she later left for other ESPN related projects and was replaced by Nuestra Belleza México 2010 winner Karin Ontiveros. On November 28, 2014, it was announced Poncho Vera was leaving the show to host #RedesESPN in ESPN's primary studio facilities in Bristol, Connecticut.

After Karin Ontiveros left the show in March 2015, she was replaced later that year by fellow beauty pageant titleholder, Nuestra Belleza Distrito Federal 2013 winner Paulina García Robles.

The show first aired in the United States on October 10, 2015, covering the 2015 CONCACAF Cup between Mexico and the United States. It also aired on November 13, 2015, covering the 2018 FIFA World Cup qualifier between Mexico and El Salvador at Estadio Azteca. On February 29, 2016, the first hour of the show started airing on ESPN Deportes in the United States on a permanent basis.

The show was first filmed in ESPN's Mexico original studios in Tlalnepantla de Baz, Mexico. The show along with all of ESPN Mexico's studio shows were moved to ESPN's new studios in the Mexico City borough of Tlalpan in January 2016. The first episode filmed in the new studios aired on January 4, 2016.

== Personalities ==
=== Current ===
- Juan Pablo Fernández
- Paulina García Robles
- Eitan Benezra
- Álvaro Morales
- Antonio Valle

=== Occasional ===
- Tlatoani Carrera
- Katia Castorena
- Odin Ciani
- Sergio Dipp
- Marisa Lara
- León Lecanda
- José Antonio Rodríguez

=== Former ===
- Kary Correa
- Karin Ontiveros
- Poncho Vera
