= Carolina Padrón =

Venezuelan-Mexican journalist (born 1983)

- Born: Carolina Desireé José Padrón Ríos; March 20, 1983 (age 43); Maracaibo, Venezuela
- Education: Universidad Santa María; Universidad CEU San Pablo
- Occupations: Sportscaster; Journalist; Television host
- Years active: 2006–present

Carolina Desireé José Padrón Ríos (born March 20, 1983) is a Venezuelan-Mexican sportscaster, journalist and television host currently working for ESPN Deportes and ESPN Mexico. Padrón is the co-anchor of ESPN's Spanish version of SportsCenter and also has covered sporting events such as the FIFA World Cup and the Summer Olympics.

== Career ==
Padrón has a degree in Social Communication from the Universidad Santa Maria and earned a Masters in Journalism from CEU San Pablo University in Spain through a grant from the Fundacion Carolina. Padrón started her career in 2006 as an intern for Radio Marca of Madrid, Spain which was also made possible by the grant from the Fundacion Carolina.

Padrón then moved back to her native Venezuela where she worked for Meridiano Televisión covering various events such as the 2010 FIFA U-20 Women's World Cup, the 2010 FIFA U-17 Women's World Cup and also covered the 2007 Copa América for Univision network Telefutura. (now known as UniMás)

In December 2010, Padrón moved to Mexico City to work for ESPN as a co-anchor for the network’s flagship program, SportsCenter. She replaced fellow Venezuelan Adriana Monsalve who moved to Los Angeles to host Nación ESPN.

Padrón has covered various sporting events for ESPN such as the Caribbean Series, the World Baseball Classic, the Mexican Tennis Open, various important European football matches, the 2016 Summer Olympics and two FIFA World Cups (2014 and 2018).

On December 7, 2015, Padrón along with her colleague Jorge Eduardo Sánchez anchored the first SportsCenter from ESPN's new four-studio production facility in Mexico City.

Since August 2017, Padrón has hosted her own edition of SportsCenter called SC5.

== Personal life ==
Padrón was born in Maracaibo but was raised in Puerto la Cruz.

Padrón currently resides in Mexico City and also lived in Madrid when she worked for Radio Marca.

In 2013, Padrón along with her fellow SportsCenter anchors Álvaro Morales and Jorge Eduardo Sánchez appeared in a This is SportsCenter commercial with Rafael Nadal which aired both in English and Spanish.

Padrón has her own blog called La Chica del Banquillo.

Padrón became a Mexican citizen on February 10, 2024.
