= Sergio Dipp =

Mexican sportscaster

- Born: Sergio Alejandro Dipp Walthe; July 23, 1988 (age 37); Mexicali, Mexico
- Occupation: Sportscaster
- Years active: 2009–present
- Notable credit: SportsCenter co-anchor Monday Night Football sideline reporter analyst

Sergio Alejandro Dipp Walthe (born July 23, 1988) is a Mexican sportscaster for ESPN Deportes and ESPN International. He co-hosts a Latin American edition of SportsCenter and NFL Live. He also covers the Mexico national football team for ESPN Deportes.

Dipp has covered a variety of major sporting events. He served as a sideline reporter on ESPN for Monday Night Football in 2017, covered four Super Bowls (XLVIII, XLIX, 50, LI) and was a commentator for the 2012 Summer Olympics.

== Early life ==
Dipp was born as Sergio Alejandro Dipp Walthe, in Mexicali, Mexico. Later, Dipp moved to Monterrey, Nuevo León. Dipp attended college in Monterrey, Mexico where he studied communications. While in Mexico, he played American football and was listed as a defensive-lineman.

== Career ==
=== Early career ===
Dipp started his professional career in the sports section of "La Afición" in Milenio Television. Later for, Multimedios Deportes, he covered the Super Bowl, NBA All-Star Game, matches of the Mexico national football team and the 2012 Summer Olympics.

=== ESPN ===
Dipp was hired by ESPN in 2013, mainly to work for their Spanish counterpart, ESPN Deportes. In Week 11 of the NFL Season, Dipp covered the Raiders vs. Patriots game in Mexico City for NFL Live and ESPN Sunday Countdown.

=== Monday Night Football ===
In 2017, ESPN opened Monday Night Football with special back-to-back games. The regular broadcast team led by Sean McDonough, Jon Gruden and Lisa Salters covered the first game, and the second game was called by Beth Mowins, Rex Ryan and Dipp.

While reporting from the sideline in the first quarter, Dipp sounded unsure while providing a sideline report on Broncos' coach Vance Joseph, at one point exuberantly saying, "And here he is, having the time of his life!"

The video clip of Dipp's report gained attention on social media, and has continued to resurface in the years since. During the game, he did not appear on air again, but he did give off-air reports from the sidelines and held a post-game interview with Broncos quarterback Trevor Siemian. After the game, Dipp's producer, Tim Corrigan, said of Dipp: "In live television, anyone can have a difficult moment—reporters, producers, etc. It happens and he handled it with class."

For the 2023 season, ESPN Deportes introduced the new team of Rebeca Landa on the play-by-play, with Dipp as analyst, and Katia Castorena as sideline reporter. John Sutcliffe will continue to be part of the team, providing reports from site.

== Television ==
Programs

Year	Program	Time	Channel
2013	SportsCenter	Monday to Sunday (several broadcasts)	ESPN Latin America, ESPN 2 (Latin America)
2014	Toque Inicial	Monday to Friday: 8:00 a.m. to 10:00 p.m.	ESPN (Latin America)
2014	Fútbol Picante	Monday to Friday: 1:00 p.m. to 2:00 p.m.	ESPN 2 (Latin America)
2014	Los Capitanes en ESPN	Monday to Friday: 2:00 p.m. to 3:00 p.m.	ESPN 2 (Latin America)
2015	NFL Live	Monday to Friday: 5:00 a.m. to 6:00 p.m.	ESPN 2 (Latin America)
