= Daniel Brailovsky =

Israeli former footballer and manager

Daniel Brailovsky דניאל בריילובסקי
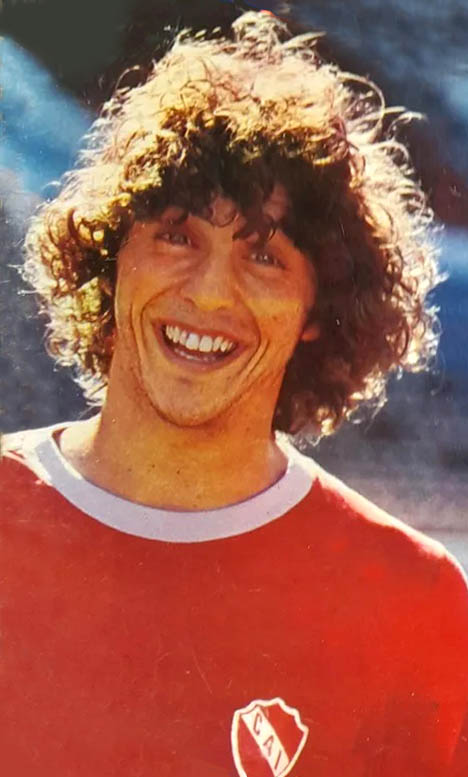
- Brailovsky with Independiente in 1980

Personal information
- Full name: Daniel Alberto Brailovsky Poliak
- Date of birth: November 18, 1958 (age 67)
- Place of birth: Buenos Aires, Argentina
- Height: 1.73 m (5 ft 8 in)
- Position: Midfielder

Senior career*
Years	Team	Apps	(Gls)
1976–1978	Peñarol		
1980	All Boys	26	(7)
1980–1982	Independiente	75	(27)
1982–1985	América	87	(37)
1986–1988	Maccabi Haifa	56	(11)
Total		244	(82)

International career
1977–1978	Uruguay U20		
1986–1988	Israel	18	(3)

Managerial career
- Maccabi Kfar Kana
- Maccabi Herzliya
- 1998–1999: Maccabi Haifa
- 2002: Veracruz
- 2007–2008: América
- 2010–2011: Necaxa
- * Club domestic league appearances and goals

Daniel Alberto Brailovsky Poliak (Hebrew: אלברטו דניאל בריילובסקי, sometimes spelled Brailovski, born November 18, 1958) is a former professional footballer and manager.

He was born in Buenos Aires, Argentina, and is Jewish. Though he was born and raised in Argentina, he only played officially for the Israel national team. He had previously represented Uruguay at the youth level.

== Playing career ==
An attacking midfielder and striker, Brailovsky was born in Buenos Aires, and after playing amateur football at Jewish clubs, Brailovsky was brought to Montevideo for a trial at Peñarol. Under the guidance of coach Roque Máspoli, Brailovsky became part of the team that won the 1978 championship and qualified for the 1979 Copa Libertadores. Brailovsky also was member of the Uruguay National Youth team in 1977–78.

After being dropped from Peñarol by coach Dino Sani in 1979, Brailovsky returned to Argentina to play for All Boys. At the end of Metropolitano 1980, Brailovsky's first tournament in Argentina, All Boys was relegated to Primera B (Second Division), but Brailovsky left a good impression and was eventually signed by Independiente. With the Avellaneda club, Brailovsky made his debut on 7 September 1980 against Ferro Carril Oeste, replacing Norberto Outes. The game ended 1–0 to Ferro.

While at Independiente, Brailovsky was called up a few times to play for the Argentina national team, but never did it officially, except for a few matches against regional teams. Previous to the 1982 FIFA World Cup he was in coach César Luis Menotti's consideration, but never made it to Spain. Brailovsky's last game for Independiente was on 16 May 1982; a 0–4 defeat against Ferro Carril Oeste, then champion of the Nacional 1982. Brailovsky was sent off in the 82nd minute by referee Arturo Ithurralde. In total in Argentina, Brailovsky played 101 games (26 with All Boys and 75 with Independiente), and scored 34 goals (7 with All Boys and 27 with Independiente).

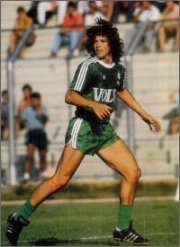
Brailovsky playing for Maccabi Haifa c. 1986–88

In 1982, he signed with Mexican Club América, and helped Las Águilas to win three championships. Those championships were the 1983–1984 season (when defeated Chivas Guadalajara), then the 1984–1985 (when defeated UNAM Pumas in a controversial decisive 3rd match held in Santiago de Querétaro), his last one with the team was the 1985 summer tournament once known as the " Prode '85 "- a short tournament where they defeat the then team known as los Jaibos Tampico Madero.

After the earthquake suffered by Mexico in 1985, his wife was afraid something worse might happen, so Brailovsky left the country without notifying Club América officials. As a result he was suspended for breach of contract by America for about a year with FIFA's consent. He then immigrated to Israel and joined Maccabi Haifa. He was capped 18 times for Israel from 1986 to 1988, scoring three international goals during his career. He said about living in Israel, "I have played in Argentina, Mexico, Uruguay and Israel, but only Israel feels like home."

== Honours ==
=== As a player ===
Season	Club	Title
1978	(Uruguay) Peñarol	Primera División Uruguaya
1983–1984	(Mexico) Club América	Primera División de México
1984–1985	(Mexico) Club América	Primera División de México
Prode 1985	(Mexico) Club América	Primera División de México

== Coaching career ==
Brailovsky began coaching in Israel in 1996 with Maccabi Kfar Kana in the Second Division and that year, he led them to the title. Daniel moved to Maccabi Herzliya the following year and then to Maccabi Haifa in 1998. In September 2002, Brailovsky became the head coach of Veracruz in Mexico.

In October 2007, Brailovsky became the head coach of Club América in Mexico until fired in February 2008.

In August 2010, he became the head coach of Club Necaxa in Mexico.

== Broadcasting ==
After leaving Veracruz, Brailovsky took a job at a local show in Mexico city called "Super Estadio." in the Estadio W company. After the show cancelled, Brailovsky took a job offering from ESPN Deportes, the Spanish-language version of ESPN. He was then a correspondent for SportsCenter and Fútbol Picante, as well as the radio/TV show ESPN Radio Formula. He also had his own show that aired Sunday nights on ESPN Deportes called "La Ruleta Rusa." After his firing in Necaxa, he was not asked to return to ESPN soon enough and opted to join Fox Deportes where he is one their main contributors for their new show La Ultima Palabra.

== See also ==
- List of select Jewish football (association; soccer) players
- List of Jews in sports (non-players)
