= Nación ESPN =

- Presented by: David Faitelson; Mauricio Pedroza; Pilar Pérez
- Country of origin: United States
- Original language: Spanish

Production
- Production location: Los Angeles, California
- Running time: 60 minutes (including commercials)

Original release
- Network: ESPN Deportes
- Release: February 14, 2011 – December 21, 2018

Related
- SportsNation

Nación ESPN was a sports-related talk show, modeled after ESPN's Sportsnation TV series. It was hosted by three sports journalists in the Latino market, David Faitelson, Mauricio Pedroza and Pilar Pérez, who feature strong opinions, heated debates, celebrity interviews and heavy interaction with fans from all of the existing social media platforms. The one-hour, Monday-thru-Friday show, is built around the fan and produced from the “L.A. Live” studios in HD. The show may establish Los Angeles as the Spanish language capital for ESPN. It premiered on ESPN Deportes February 14, 2011. The show also began airing on ESPN for Mexico and Latin America since May 20, 2011.

The show was created by Ignacio Garcia, Coordinating Producer in charge of all TV Productions for ESPN Deportes and ESPN International originated from Los Angeles. The show received the EMMY Award for Outstanding Sports TV Show in 2014. The same year, Garcia also expanded the brand with Nación ESPN Fin de Semana, the weekend version that shows the Top 50 best and worst plays of the week.

Garcia also launched the English-language version of the program airing on ESPN2 on Monday, September 26. The one-hour afternoon interactive sports talk show is targeting bilingual U.S. Hispanic sports fans. “Nación ESPN” on ESPN2 is hosted by three Latino commentators: Jorge Sedano, co-host of ESPNLA's Mornings with Keyshawn and Jorge and LZ, Bernardo Osuna, ESPN's bilingual boxing reporter and host of ESPN Deportes’ A Los Golpes, and baseball expert Marly Rivera. The show airs live at 5 p.m. ET on Mondays from ESPN's studios in Los Angeles. The show leverages the crossover that exists between the programs, connecting the ESPN and ESPN Deportes audiences.

The show ended its run on December 21, 2018, and was replaced by Ahora o Nunca, a Spanish-language version of ESPN2's Now or Never.

== On-air staff ==
=== Nación ESPN English-language version ===
- Jorge Sedano (2016–2018)
- Marly Rivera (2016–2018)
- Bernardo Osuna (2016–2018)

=== Nación ESPN Spanish-language version ===
- David Faitelson (2011–2018)
- Rosy Martell (2015)
- Adriana Monsalve (2011–2014)
- Mauricio Pedroza (2015–2018)
- Pilar Pérez (2016–2018)

== See also ==
- SportsNation (TV series) - Original
