= José Ramón Fernández (journalist) =

Mexican journalist and sportscaster (born 1946)

- Born: José Ramón Fernández Álvarez; April 6, 1946 (age 80); Puebla, Mexico
- Education: Benemérita Universidad Autónoma de Puebla
- Occupations: Sportscaster; Journalist; Television host
- Years active: 1970–present
- Children: 4

José Ramón Fernández Álvarez (born 6 April 1946) is a Mexican journalist, sportscaster, sports commentator, and television host currently working for ESPN Deportes and ESPN Mexico. Fernández started his journalistic career in 1970 and since has covered numerous major sporting events such as the FIFA World Cup and the Summer Olympics.

Considered one of the most respected journalists and an "institution" in Mexican sports journalism, Fernández is also considered one of the most controversial journalists in Mexico. Fernández has covered 10 FIFA World Cups and 10 Summer Olympic Games.

Fernández is considered one of all-time best journalists in Mexico by Spanish sports newspaper Marca.

== Career ==
Fernández began his broadcasting career in 1970 at a local television station in his hometown of Puebla owned by TIM (now Televisa), then worked in Canal 13 (which later became TV Azteca) and now works for ESPN. Fernández is one of the creators of DeporTV, one of the longest-running sports television shows in Mexico, running since 1974. He also hosted Los Protagonistas along with various journalists such as Raul Orvañanos, Francisco Javier González, Carlos Albert, Rafael Puente, Roberto Gómez Junco, Ciro Procuna and David Faitelson.

Fernández played a big role in revealing one of the biggest scandals in Mexican football history, commonly referred as "Cachirules". Fernandez revealed that the Mexican Football Federation knowingly used at least four overage players in the Mexico under-20 team at the 1988 CONCACAF U-20 Tournament. Fernández backed up his Imevisión colleague Antonio Moreno, who first revealed the scandal in an article in the Mexican newspaper Ovaciones but his allegations were denied by the Mexican Football Federation. After CONCACAF and FIFA looked into the situation all Mexico youth teams and eventually the senior team as well, were banned from all international competition for two years, including the 1990 FIFA World Cup.

Fernández worked for Canal 13/Imevisión/TV Azteca for 33 years where he hosted DeporTV, Los Protagonistas and covered every FIFA World Cup from 1978 to 2006 and every Summer Olympics from 1976 to 2004.

In 1996 Fernández was named vice-president of sports of TV Azteca.

Fernández temporarily left TV Azteca due to health problems in September 2006, he later returned to host a show named Joserra presenta but shortly left for good in September 2007 citing various betrayals as the reason for his departure, most notably from colleague André Marín.

Fernández later followed many of his fellow TV Azteca journalists and joined ESPN in November 2007. At ESPN, Fernández was reunited with many of his TV Azteca colleagues such as David Faitelson, Rafael Puente, Carlos Albert, and Ángel García Toraño. At ESPN, Fernández has covered three Summer Olympic Games (2008, 2012 and 2016), four FIFA World Cups (2010, 2014, 2018, 2022), and two Pan American Games (2011, 2015).

Fernández currently hosts various programs on ESPN, including Cronómetro, Los Capitanes, Fútbol Picante and Comex Masters with various journalists and former footballers. He also occasionally appears on other ESPN shows such as Toque Inicial, SportsCenter, and ESPN Radio Fórmula. He also commentates various football matches from various leagues and tournaments such as the UEFA Champions League and other football leagues and tournaments.

== Personal life ==
Fernández has four children; José Ramón Jr. (born 1973), Juan Pablo (born 1978), María Asunción (born 1979) and Lorea (born 2006). He also has five grandchildren, all from his eldest daughter María Asunción. Fernández eldest son, José Ramón Jr. works as a journalist in Spain while his other son, Juan Pablo hosts ESPN Mexico morning sports show Toque Inicial.

During his 70th birthday celebration on ESPN Mexico's program Los Capitanes , he revealed he was not present at any of his children's births due to his job. Fernández was covering the 1973 CONCACAF Championship in Haiti when José Ramón Jr. was born, he was in Argentina narrating the 1978 FIFA World Cup match between West Germany and Mexico when Juan Pablo was born, covering the 1979 Summer Universiade when María Asunción was born and covering the 2006 FIFA World Cup in Germany when his youngest child, Lorea was born.
