= Los Ciegos Del Barrio =

Latin American multi-genre music band

Los Ciegos Del Barrio is an all-blind multi-genre Latin American music band based out of the New York City area. They specialize in salsa, merengue, bachata music, cumbia and rock in both English and Spanish. They have recorded several albums and singles since 2000. The name Los Ciegos Del Barrio translates from Spanish as "the blind boys from the neighborhood."

== History ==
Los Ciegos Del Barrio was founded in 1997 by Alvin Suarez and Machete, although the members of the group had been performing together long before then. The name, "Los Ciegos Del Barrio," was adopted jokingly by Jaime Diaz, Machete's cousin, during their first rehearsal in the summer of 1997. Without having agreed on an alternative name, the group decided to let the name stick as an ice breaker.

The original members of Los Ciegos Del Barrio were as follows:

Alvin Suarez: Band Director, bongos, tambora and backing vocals

Machete: Co-founder, bass, keyboards and backing vocals

Jaime Diaz: rhythm guitar and lead vocals

Domingo Rosario: lead guitar, lead vocals

Braulio Thorne: güira

In 1992, before forming Los Ciegos Del Barrio, some of the future members, including Alvin Suarez, his identical twin brother, Derek Christopher Suarez, Jimmy Fontanez and Machete, played Latin music in Russia with a non-profit organization called "Project Troubador". Project Troubador's founder and artistic director, Eliot Osborn came across the talented group during his teaching stint at the New York Institute for the Blind, and has since then helped develop the act. In 1996, also through Project Troubador, Machete and the Suarez twins embarked on a two-week trip to the Dominican Republic, playing for a wide variety of audiences of all ages. This trip is believed to have inspired Alvin Suarez to form Los Ciegos Del Barrio a year later.

In 1998, Los Ciegos released their first self-titled demo album on cassette, with Jaime Diaz and Mingo Rosario handling lead vocals.

In 2000, they released their first full-length album, "No Lo Dude," which features their first underground hit "Dime Donde Estas," sung by Derek Christopher Suarez, who joined the Ciegos on bass guitar and vocals. It was their first song to receive radio airplay, and the first to reach #1 on the former MP3.com website.

In 2003, they released "Dominando," which includes a bachata version of "I Will Survive," also sung by Derek Christopher Suarez. This CD also features their first merengue to receive radio airplay, "Y Sigues Hablando," written and performed by Alvin Suarez. This album also features their first salsa track; their version of Cuco Valoy's "El Juicio," sung by Machete.

Some lineup changes were made, as Alvin Suarez took over as lead guitarist, Derek Christopher Suarez became the full-time bassist, Machete switched to keyboards, Henny Fernandez debuted on tambora and bongos and Kelvin Perez took over on güira. Jaime Diaz continued on rhythm guitar. Henny and Jaime were featured in some of the backing vocals, while Derek Christopher Suarez, Alvin Suarez and Machete assumed lead vocal duties. During live performances, the band expanded its musical diversity, incorporating more salsa and cumbia to their repertoire.

In 2006, again through Project Troubador, Los ciegos returned to the Dominican Republic for another two-week tour; playing in all types of venues such as parks, schools, marketplaces, night clubs, nursing homes, orphanages and theaters. It was during this trip that Henny and Kelvin decided to leave the group and pursue other careers.

In 2007, another Los Ciegos del Barrio track, a bachata version of "Brown Eyed Girl," sung by Derek Christopher Suarez, appeared on "Sound insight: Volume 1," a compilation CD recorded and sponsored by the former Performing Arts Division of the National Federation of the Blind (United States), which features different blind artists from around the US.

In 2009, Los Ciegos released their third album "Por Que?...PorQue!" which featured "Quitate del Medio," written, arranged and sung by Derek Christopher Suarez, their first recorded salsa using a brass section; and "Ciegueton," written and sung by the Suarez twins, their first reggaeton. They also featured a rock version of "Dime Donde Estas," Derek Christopher Suarez's merengue, "Ha Ha Ha" and Machete's bachata entitled "Yo Volvere (Homenaje a Savana Iglesia)," which was a tribute to his family's home town of Savana Iglesia, in the Dominican Republic.

At this time, for live shows, Alvin would handle both guitar and percussion, Derek Christopher Suarez moved from bass to congas, Jaime moved from guitar to bass and Machete remained on keyboards. Percussionists, Angel Dueno and Jimmy Fontanez were occasionally featured in live shows; but not on the album.

Los Ciegos were unhappy with the overall production of "Por Que?...Porque!, as it was recorded in several recording studios, and took extremely long to complete. Despite this, the Ciegos received their first mainstream television exposure in late 2012, with Alvin Suarez's composition, "Loco," which is a fusion of rock and bachata. The song was featured on Univision's hit show, "Republica Deportiva," increasing Los Ciegos' national fan base. This was also their first #1 hit on Reverb Nation's Latin charts nationwide.

In 2010, Los Ciegos Del Barrio recorded another single, "Buscando La Luz," written by Derek Christopher Suarez and Marco Suarez, the twins' father. The song was featured on a compilation CD put together by the former Visionary Media Company, called "Songs About Blindness." This compilation also features a collection of blind artists from around the United States. Due to a short deadline, the song was quickly recorded, with Derek Christopher Suarez on piano, bass, congas and lead vocals. Newcomer, Tony Diaz on timbales, Alvin Suarez on bongos and a team of studio musicians on trumpet, trombone and saxophone. The song was arranged by Derek.

In 2011, through Project Troubador, Los Ciegos Del Barrio played a two-week tour of Havana, Cuba. They played in numerous cultural venues as part of the annual week-long "Fiera de Libros" (Book Fair). Los Ciegos Del Barrio also made appearances on Cuban radio, television and newspapers. They were the first United States band to appear in the Book Fair's annual main event, which is a nationally televised concert held in La Plaza San Francisco in front of an estimated 11,000 people.

Some of these performances were selected as part of their fourth CD released in 2012, a live album called "Los Ciegos Del Barrio: Live in havana, Cuba." This album was the first to be released on download cards and features a few tracks from some of the Cuban artists that the Ciegos befriended during their trip. Cuban standards, such as "Son De La Loma," "Yerberito Moderno" "El Cuarto De Tula" and "El Manisero" were performed by Los Ciegos. The album also features short sound clips of some of the more memorable moments recorded by the group during their visit.

Just before the trip, Jimmy Fontanez joined the group full-time on congas and güira, while Derek moved back to bass. Alvin took on the timbales and returned to tambora, while Jaime returned to guitar. The album features lead vocals by Derek Christopher Suarez, Machete and Jimmy Fontanez, who sang "Bilongo/La Negra Tomasa."

In the Fall of 2012, due to personal and creative differences, it was announced by band director, Alvin Suarez that the band would finish any remaining commitments through 2013, then go on hiatus.

In March 2013, the Ciegos embarked on their second trip to Cuba, which turned out to be a disappointing experience for the group, as many of the performances were in the same locations as in the 2011 trip. Current events also exacerbated matters, as due to the March 5th announcement of the death of Venezuelan president, Hugo Chávez, Cuba observed several National Days of Mourning in memory of their ally, cancelling all musical and entertainment events nationwide. An announcement of Chavez's death was made in the middle of the band's performance in a children's music school, putting an abrupt end to the show and the rest of the performance itinerary. The Ciegos continued performing until the late Summer of 2013 before officially going on hiatus. The hiatus was short-lived, however, as due to popular demand, the Ciegos decided to put their differences aside and resume performing in the summer of 2014, beginning with the Live at the Lakefront concert series in Milwaukee, Wisconsin - an event in which they played every summer from 2010 through 2018. During their 9 appearances, Los Ciegos set 3 attendance records. They were the only Latin group featured, and were the only group that organizers would fly in from out of state.

By 2014, a vast majority of performances featured what they dubbed the "Core 4:" Alvin Suarez, Derek Christopher Suarez, Jimmy Fontanez and Machete, though others would occasionally join, such as Jaime Diaz on bass, Tony Jimenez on congas and Domingo Pascual on timbales and güira. Derek Christopher Suarez began playing more keyboard for "Los Ciegos, particularly when Machete was unavailable.

In the Spring of 2015, the Ciegos released a single, a salsa version of the 1982 hit, "Mama Used to Say" by Junior. The Ciegos' version was arranged by Machete and is sung by Jimmy Fontanez and Derek Christopher Suarez. The band's overall growth and ability is even more noticeable in this track, which exhibits a heavy Cuban influence.

Later that same year, another single, "Baby Boy," written and sung by Alvin Suarez, was released. Written and sung by Alvin Suarez, this song, like "Loco," is a fusion of rock and bachata.

Both of the 2015 releases have been highly acclaimed for their creativity, production, musical arrangements, vocal work and subject matter, and have also enjoyed mainstream radio play in different parts of the United States. They are also putting up high download numbers from various digital music web sites, including Spotify and Deezer.

In 2016, Los Ciegos released their 5th studio album, "El Futuro," produced by Jimmy Fontanez. "El Futuro" consists of a total of 10 songs representing numerous genres. In addition to "Baby Boy," this album features a longer version of "Mama Used to Say," the title track, "El Futuro Comienza Ahora," which discusses the United States' efforts under the Obama administration to reopen relations with Cuba. and Alvin Suarez's "Eclipse." "Baby Boy" is now the most downloaded original song, while "Mama Used to Say" is the most downloaded cover song. "El Futuro" is their most successful album to date.

Later in 2016, Los Ciegos released their first ever official music video, "Mama Used to Say," followed by videos of "Baby Boy" and "Eclipse." Los Ciegos ended the year by winning the City Access Award for their contributions to numerous charities and communities around the country.

In the Spring of 2018, in the wake of the Parkland school shooting, Los Ciegos recorded their version of Tom Petty's "I Won't Back Down," sung by Alvin Suarez. The song also features vocal help by Alvin's identical twin daughters, Elizia and Catalina. Rosa Ramirez also provided some backing vocals, as she did in "El Futuro Comienza Ahora" and "I'm No Fool For You" from the 2016 album. "I Won't Back Down" was debuted live that summer at the Clarendon Make Music Festival near Arlington, Virginia. The group performed with a young rapper by the name of Ai Righteous.

In 2019, Jimmy Fontanez announced that he would be leaving the group, as he would be moving to another state. With Machete already having moved out of state several years before and his availability being limited, this would leave the Suarez twins as the only remaining core members of the group. Tony Jimenez, Domingo Pascual, Rosa Ramirez and percussionist newcomer Ana Laborde are occasionally featured with the twins.

On February 3, 2020, tragedy struck, as original member, Jaime Diaz lost a long-time battle with cancer, dying at 12:30 pm that afternoon. It was a devastating loss to Los Ciegos, as well as to many other musicians and bands with whom he played. Despite many delays and changes to the music scene due to the COVID-19 pandemic of 2020, Los Ciegos released a single entitled "Our Land". This single is a collaboration between Los Ciegos and Ai Righteous. Both Alvin and Derek Christopher Suarez sing lead vocals, while Ai Righteous raps. alvin Suarez's young twin daughters are once again featured. Los Ciegos hope to release their next album at the end of 2020.

== Members ==
=== Current members ===
Alvin Suarez - Band director, lead guitar, drums, percussion and vocals. (1997 to Present)

Derek Christopher Suarez - Bass, keyboards, percussion and vocals. (1999 to Present)

=== Other Members ===
Machete - piano, Keyboards, accordion, flute, harmonica, percussion and vocals. (1997 to Present)

Jimmy Fontanez - Congas, percussion and vocals. (1997, 2007 to Present)

Andre Donatien - Lead Guitar (2005 to Present)

Tony Jimenez - Congas, percussion (2007 to Present)

Domingo Pascual - Timbales, güira (2011 to Present)

Rosa Ramirez - Backing Vocals (2016 to Present)

Ana Laborde - Congas, percussion (2019 to Present)

=== Past members ===
Jaime Diaz - Lead guitar, bass and vocals (1997 to 2016)

Braulio Thorne - Percussion (1997 to 1999)

Henny Fernandez - Percussion (1999 to 2006)

Kelvin Perez - Percussion (2000 to 2006)

Angel Dueno - Timbales and percussion. (2009 to 2011)

Note: Rosario, Fernandez, Perez and Dueno are all fully sighted.

== Associated acts ==
Dreadbeat Dadz - Led by Andre Donatien (2016)

Ai Righteous (2020)

Rumba Nation - Led by Derek Christopher Suarez (2020)

== Discography ==
No Lo Dude - Released: 2000 (U.S.)

Dominando - Released: 2003 (U.S.)

Por Que?...Porque! - Released: 2009 (U.S.)

Live in Havana, Cuba - Released: 2012 (U.S.)

El Futuro - Released: 2016 (U.S.)

I Won't Back Down (Single) - Released: 2018 (U.S.)

Our Land featuring Ai Righteous (Single) - Released: 2020 (U.S.)
