= Rafael Puente Jr. =

Mexican actor and footballer (born 1979)

Personal information
- Full name: Rafael Puente del Río
- Date of birth: 31 January 1979 (age 47)
- Place of birth: Mexico City, Mexico
- Height: 1.73 m (5 ft 8 in)
- Position: Forward

Team information
- Current team: West Santos FC (AKL) (Manager)

Senior career*
Years	Team	Apps	(Gls)
2003	Atlante	1	(0)
2004	Necaxa	0	(0)

Managerial career
- 2016–2018: BUAP
- 2018–2019: Querétaro
- 2020: Atlas
- 2021–2022: Juárez (Assistant)
- 2023: UNAM
- 2024: Muchachos FC (AKL)
- 2025–: West Santos FC (AKL)
- * Club domestic league appearances and goals

Rafael Puente del Río or Rafael Puente Jr. (born 31 January 1979) is a Mexican former actor, professional footballer, and manager.

== Career ==
Born to soccer columnist and former Mexico national team goalkeeper Rafael Puente, Puente Jr. began playing football as a striker with Mexican Primera División side Atlante F.C., making his professional debut in 2003. He transferred to Club Necaxa in 2004.

Then on May 22, 2006, he debuted as an actor in telenovelas in Codigo Postal as Hector Garza. He is now a sports commentator.

He was appointed the chief operating officer for Guadalajara in May 2014. He was let go in October 2014 by newly appointed chairman Néstor de la Torre.

After being fired from Guadalajara, Puente Jr. joined his father as an analyst and commentator for ESPN Deportes in the United States and also for ESPN Mexico. At ESPN, Puente Jr. covered the 2015 Copa América in Chile, the 2016 UEFA Champions League Final in Milan, the 2016 UEFA Euro, and also appeared on the networks show like Fútbol Picante, Los Capitanes, ESPN Radio Fórmula and ESPN Fútbol Center.

Although he had limited experience as a professional footballer, Puente became a football manager, drawing on his experiences playing for Enrique Meza, Miguel Herrera and José Guadalupe Cruz. On October 5, 2016, Puente Jr. was announced as the new manager for Ascenso MX club Lobos BUAP.

On May 20, 2017, Rafael Puente Jr. successfully managed Lobos BUAP into Liga MX promotion for the 2017–18 season. He signed a new one-year contract with Lobos in June 2017. On 2 April 2018, Puente Jr. was sacked after earning nine points in 13 games of the Clausura 2018 season.

On January 30, 2020, Puente Jr. was appointed by Atlas. On August 10, 2020, Puente was sacked from Atlas after winning only one match of nine.

== Honours ==
=== Manager ===
Lobos BUAP

- Ascenso MX: Clausura 2017
- Campeón de Ascenso: 2016-17
