= Alba Galindo =

- Born: February 26, 1981 (age 45); Miami, Florida, United States
- Occupations: Model; Television host

Alba Galindo (born February 26, 1981) is an American-born Colombian model, television host, and sportscaster, who currently works for ESPN Deportes. Galindo is well known for her previous role as a Senadora on the weekly sports show República Deportiva on Univision.

== Career ==
Galindo was born in Miami, but moved to Cali, Colombia soon thereafter. At the age of seventeen, she began her modeling career. Galindo was a model for various companies including Marlboro, Buchanan's, and Johnnie Walker. Three years later, she returned to her native Miami to further her career in the industry. Numerous opportunities for appearing in sportswear and swimsuit catalogues resulted after the move.

In 2004, Galindo won the Miss Republica Deportiva competition held by Univision. Two years later, she participated in the Yo Quiero Ser Senadora contest to win a spot on the popular show Republica Deportiva. She was ultimately chosen and signed a contract with the network. From 2006 through 2015, she formed a longstanding duo on the program with the fellow Miami-born Colombian model Natalia Saenz.

On 11 January 2015, Galindo announced that she would not be returning to Republica Deportiva. On 14 April 2015, Galindo joined ESPN Deportes. She was host of the "Redes ESPN" and still participates as talent in NFL and NBA games for USA and Latin America.

== Filmography ==
Film
Year	Title	Role	Notes
2008	Pecados de una profesora	Chica playa	Direct-to-video

Television
Year	Title	Role	Notes
2005	El Gordo y la Flaca	Herself	Episode on June 23
2008	Valeria	Nancy Mistral	Episode #1.1
2006–2015	República Deportiva	Herself	
