= República Deportiva =

American television program

- Genre: Sports
- Presented by: Fernando Fiore (1999–2014); Julián Gil (2015–2024); Mané de la Parra (2016–2017)
- Starring: Rosana Franco (1999–2012); Jorge Gomez (1999–2004); Félix Fernández (2004–2024); Lindsay Casinelli (2014–2022); Adriana Monsalve (2014–2019)
- Country of origin: United States
- Original language: Spanish

Production
- Executive producer: Gonzalo Morozzi
- Camera setup: Multi-camera
- Running time: 1 hour (including commercials)
- Production company: Univision Deportes

Original release
- Network: Univision
- Release: April 11, 1999 – January 14, 2024

República Deportiva is an American sports news television program that aired weekly on the Spanish-language American television network Univision. The show ran continuously on Sundays for nearly 25 years.

== History ==
República Deportiva was initially hosted by Fernando Fiore, Rosana Franco, and Jorge Gómez in 1999. Gómez left the show in 2004 and was replaced by Félix Fernández, a former professional goalkeeper for the Mexico national football team. Franco was dismissed from the show in 2012, and Fiore's departure followed in 2014. In that same year, Lindsay Casinelli and Adriana Monsalve officially joined the program to fill the vacant positions. Julián Gil officially replaced Fiore as the show's main host in 2015. In October 2016 Mané de la Parra joined as the show's host on occasions when Gil cannot appear. On January 17, 2024, it was reported that the program had been cancelled.

== Content ==
República Deportiva primarily covers sports favored by the predominantly Hispanic audience, though it also dedicates segments to sports and events outside the liking of the target demographic. Football (soccer) is heavily covered and analyzed, highlighting matches from leagues in Europe and the Americas such as the Premier League, Liga MX, Major League Soccer, and La Liga. Focus is also placed on popular sports like baseball (MLB), boxing, mixed martial arts, and basketball. There is also some time dedicated to other sports popular solely in North America such as gridiron football and Formula One racing. Usually notable sportspeople and coaches/managers from past and present are interviewed and even invited to the show.

The show features many segments including the popular "Pregúntale a Felix" (or "Ask Felix"), where fans send in football-related questions. Contests are also a large part of the program such as "Miss República Deportiva" and "El Sabio de la República." The Senadoras, scantily-clad television presenters, are hugely popular. Notable "Senadoras" include Alba Galindo and Natalia Saenz, both of whom departed from the show in 2015 after long tenures.

== Awards ==
For República Deportiva's 20th Anniversary in 2019, Broadcasting & Cable and Multichannel News presented República Deportiva with the Award for Outstanding Achievement in Hispanic Television Programming at the 17th Annual Hispanic Television Summit, produced by Schramm Marketing Group.
