= Natalia Saenz =

Colombian model and television host

- Born: Natalia Saenz; 28 October 1981 (age 44); Miami, Florida, United States
- Occupations: Model; Television host
- Spouses: Melvin Cabrera (divorced in 2010); Pablo Rendon (2016–present)
- Website: nataliasaenz.net

Natalia Saenz (born 28 October 1981) is an American-born Colombian model and television host. Saenz is most well known for her role as a Senadora on the weekly sports show República Deportiva on Univision.

== Career ==
Saenz was born in Miami to Colombian parents, Miriam and Martha Walther Saenz. At the age of three, she moved with her family to Medellín, Colombia, where she would spend the rest of her childhood. At the age of fourteen, she began her career in the entertainment industry and often competed in beauty pageants. Four years later, she returned to her native Miami to further her career in show business. In 2003, Saenz was selected to participate in the contest for Miss República Deportiva, and was later hired by Univision to regularly appear on their popular show República Deportiva as a Senadora. From 2006 through 2015, she formed a longstanding duo on the program with the fellow Miami-born Colombian model Alba Galindo.

== Personal life ==
Saenz was married to Venezuelan actor Melvin Cabrera, who is known for his role as the homosexual Ricardo de la Fuente on the Spanish-language telenovela Mystery-Suspense television series ¿Dónde está Elisa?. The relationship ended in divorce after two-and-a-half years in 2010.

== Filmography ==
Film
Year	Title	Role	Notes
2008	Pecados de una profesora	Chica playa	Direct-to-video

Television
Year	Title	Role	Notes
2005	El Gordo y la Flaca	Herself	Episode on 23 June
2014	Tu Día Alegre	Herself	Guest
2006–2015	República Deportiva	Herself	
