= Félix Fernández (footballer) =

Mexican footballer (born 1967)

Personal information
- Full name: Félix de Jesús Fernández Christlieb
- Date of birth: 11 January 1967 (age 59)
- Place of birth: Mexico City, Mexico
- Height: 1.80 m (5 ft 11 in)
- Position: Goalkeeper

Senior career*
Years	Team	Apps	(Gls)
1987–1998	Atlante	146	(0)
1998–1999	Celaya	34	(0)
1999–2001	Atlante	24	(0)
2002	Celaya	3	(0)
2003	Atlante	1	(0)
Total		208	(0)

International career
1993–1996	Mexico	5	(0)
- * Club domestic league appearances and goals

Félix de Jesús Fernández Christlieb (born 11 January 1967) is a Mexican former professional footballer who played as a goalkeeper. He was a squad member for the Mexico national team at the 1994 FIFA World Cup.

== Retirement ==
Presently, he plays amateur football in the ADECMAC league in Mexico City in the team Club Deportivo Sahara and is an enthusiast organizer of cultural events linking literature and art with soccer. He was co-host of the Univision sports show República Deportiva from 2004 til its cancelation in 2024. He currently works for Claro Sports as analyst. He was honored by FC Atlante that retired his number which was the number 12.
