= Alfonso Vera =

Poncho Vera
- Born: Alfonso Vera Prendes; March 23, 1974 (age 50); Mexico City, Federal District, Mexico

Alfonso "Poncho" Vera is a radiohost in Mexico, he's also made a name by himself among Mexican television. Poncho studied Communication Sciences at the Universidad Intercontinental and when he started working in 1994, he worked at a cellphones company, helping in the internal communication areas, marketing and publicity. He currently works for ESPN Latin America and ESPN Deportes.

== Biography ==
In 1996 Televisa Radio decided to turn its radio broadcaster Estéreo 102 into the new VOX FM. Poncho was one of the pioneers of this new station and helped to make it one of the favourites among the young audience.

Aside with his career as a radiohost, he has also participated on television as a critic and commentator of music in spaces such as Válvula de Escape besides hosting several important events.

In the year 2000, MVS Radio launched a new station called EXA FM and once again Poncho got involved in this new project. In 2002 he conducted a program in that station, he also conducted Telehit's TV show Encuentros Cercanos and taught Radio classes at Anáhuac University. He recently divorced actress Gabriela Platas.
