= ESPN 2 (Latin America) =

- Country: United States
- Broadcast area: Latin America
- Headquarters: Buenos Aires, Argentina; Mexico City, Mexico; Bogotá, Colombia

Programming
- Language: Spanish
- Picture format: 720p HDTV (downscalled to 16:9 480i/576i for SDTVs)

Ownership
- Owner: ESPN Inc. (operated by The Walt Disney Company Latin America)
- Sister channels: ESPN; ESPN Brasil; ESPN 3; ESPN 4; ESPN Extra

History
- Former names: ESPN+ (South America only, 2002–2015)

Links
- Website: espn.com.ar espn.cl espn.com.pe espn.com.co espn.com.ve

ESPN 2 is a Latin American pay-television channel based in Buenos Aires broadcasting for Spanish-speaking Latin American countries. Its programming is mostly football-, tennis- and rugby union-related.

The channel was first launched in 1996 as ESPN 2 in Mexico and Central America and in 2002 as ESPN+ for South America. It consists on four different feeds available in the region according to its geographical location. On 1 September 2015, the network was rebranded as ESPN 2 in South America and launched its HD simulcasts for each feed. Moreover, in 2016 the ESPN 2 standard-definition feeds switched to air its programming in widescreen.

ESPN 2 shows live MotoGP races, and selected IndyCar Series races. It also complements ESPN's coverage of the four Grand Slam of tennis.

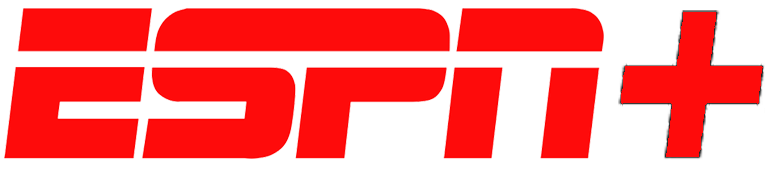
ESPN+ logo from 2005 to 2013 in South America

ESPN 2 logo from 2015 to 2020 in South America

== ESPN 2 coverage ==
As of March 2020, there are six feeds of the channel available throughout the region

- South feed, originally serving Argentina, Paraguay and Uruguay, based on Buenos Aires.
- Peru feed, covering Peru, Ecuador and Bolivia. It was launched on 3 November 2014 and works as a simulcast channel mirroring the South feed (with exception of Argentine-exclusive events) with two additional time zones featured on promos.
- Chile feed, covering that country. It was launched in June 2019 with original programming as a local spin-off from the South Andean feed (now the Peru feed).
- Andean feed, covering Colombia and Venezuela. It used to be distributed on Chile, Peru and Bolivia until they switched to the South Andean feed on 3 November 2014 (currently, the Peru feed).
- Mexico feed, serving that country. Originally launched in 1996 as the Mexican spin-off of American ESPN2, the feed used to be partnered with Mexico's National Commission for Physical Culture and Sport (CONADE) for co-producing its programming. Initially, originally-produced ESPN2 Mexico's programming was also broadcast on American sister channel ESPN2 until the creation of ESPN Deportes in the US on 2004. In 2002, the South American branch of ESPN2 was launched in Buenos Aires as ESPN+, which offered sports programming primarily centred on European events. ESPN 2 was sold as an additional high-tier channel on South America for those who opted to watch American-centred programming until 1 September 2015, when it was pulled off the air due to the rebrand of ESPN+ as ESPN 2.
- North feed, serving Central America and the Caribbean. It rebroadcasts the Mexico feed with local ads with the exception of some events licensed exclusively for that feed.

== Programming ==
=== Football ===
- Argentine Primera División (except ESPN 2 Argentina)
- English Premier League, FA Cup, League Cup, FA Community Shield
- Spanish Primera Division – La Liga
- Italian Serie A
- French Ligue 1
- CONCACAF Champions League
- U.S. Major League Soccer

=== Other sports ===
- Tennis: Australian Open
- Rugby: Heineken Cup
- Volleyball: Argentine League
- NBA
- Men's Hockey World Cup
- IRB Junior World Championship
- IRB Junior World Championship
- Women's Hockey Champions Trophy
- Major League Baseball (ESPN 2 Andean only)
- Latin American Poker Tour (LAPT)
