= Rafael Puente =

Mexican footballer and manager (born 1950)

Personal information
- Full name: Rafael Puente Suárez
- Date of birth: 5 February 1950 (age 76)
- Place of birth: Mexico City, Mexico
- Height: 1.75 m (5 ft 9 in)
- Position: Goalkeeper

Senior career*
Years	Team	Apps	(Gls)
1968–1974	Atlante		
1974–1977	América		

International career
1971–1974	Mexico	21	(0)

Managerial career
- 1989–1990: Atlante
- 1996: Pachuca
- 2000: Tecos
- * Club domestic league appearances and goals

Rafael Puente Suárez (born 5 February 1950) is a Mexican former professional footballer and manager. He currently works as an analyst for ESPN Deportes and ESPN Mexico.

== Career ==
Born in Mexico City, Puente began playing football with Mexican Primera División side Atlante F.C. He also played for Club América but was forced to retire following a knee injury.

After he retired from playing, Puente became a football coach. He managed Atlante, C.F. Pachuca and Tecos.

== Personal ==
Puente's son, Rafael Puente Jr., was also a professional football player and was manager of Lobos BUAP. Puente Jr. also worked as a commentator alongside his father for ESPN before leaving to coach Lobos BUAP.
