= Barak Fever =

Mexican sport journalist

Barak Fever Daniels (Holon, Israel; 27 August 1981) is a Mexican-Israeli sport journalist who works for the multinational sport chain ESPN. He began his professional career in TV Azteca in 1998 in their statistics department and has covered a wide variety of major sporting events such as Euro 2004 in Portugal, Euro 2008 in Austria-Switzerland, Olympics 2008 in Beijing, FIFA World Cup in Germany 2006 and America's Cup 2007 in Venezuela. Fever studied Communications at Universidad Iberoamericana in Mexico City.

== Early life ==
Fever was born on 27 August 1981 in Holon, Israel, to a Chilean father and a Mexican mother. He lived there until he was two years old, then moved to Mexico City, where he began his career, writing for the magazine Tiro de Esquina in 1995. In 1998, he began working with TV Azteca due to an invitation from David Faitelson.

== Career ==
In 2000, he finished his position in the statistics department and began to work as a commentator and reporter for soccer matches at the Mexican league, reporting directly from Spain in 2004 and 2005 during the performance of Mexican soccer players such as Rafael Márquez and Maribel Domínguez. In 2007, his position in TV Azteca was changed as he joined their creative department, creating two of the most famous sections of the popular TV show "Los Protagonistas": "La Contracrónica" and "Valedores de Iztacalco". His professional relationship with TV Azteca ended in 2009 after an issue with the Sports department (where the entire department was laid off)., Fever started working for the multinational sports chain ESPN and entered on the List of ESPN Latin America announcers in 2010.

=== La Contracrónica and Valedores de Iztacalco ===
La Contracrónica is described as quantifying the performance of a specific player during a sporting event. It began as a piece (run by Fever) in the program in 2007 using the Mexican soccer player Cuauhtémoc Blanco as a subject.

This piece has been a source of controversy given investigations have started based on the footage used; for example, when La Contracrónica of the FMF president Justino Compeán was made, he was discovered cheering for a particular football team in a match from the Mexican league. Legal investigations took off after this particular demonstration of impartiality was revealed on TV.
