= Jorge Ramos (commentator) =

American sportscaster

- Born: 1960 (age 65–66); Uruguay
- Occupation: Sports commentator
- Years active: 1994–present
- Employer: ESPN Deportes
- Known for: Jorge Ramos y Su Banda, extensive football commentary
- Notable work: Jorge Ramos y Su Banda
- Spouse: Maria Ramos
- Children: Carol Ramos, Diego Ramos

Jorge Ramos is a Uruguayan sports commentator, who started out in the U.S. as a writer and editor in La Raza, a top Spanish-language newspaper based in Chicago. Before joining ESPN, he and Hernan Pereyra co-hosted Univision Radio’s national program, Locura por el Futbol.

Currently, Ramos has a national live program, titled Jorge Ramos y Su Banda. It previously broadcast simultaneously on TV and radio, Monday through Friday from 4pm to 7pm EST before moving to ESPN+ on November 9, 2020. Following the program’s cancellation on ESPN in 2024, it was relaunched on YouTube on June 30, 2025, with a simulcast on TUDN Radio added on September of that year.

== Career ==
Jorge Ramos is known as “el relator de America” – the commentator of the Americas – and is a football commentator in the United States. ejoins ESPN Deportes Radio as the voice of the football lineup. He serves as the voice of the football lineups, Ramos provides play-by-play commentary on his weekday show, “Jorge Ramos y Su Banda.”

During his more than thirty-year career, Ramos has served as play-by-play commentator for over 3,000 football matches, including 1,400 Liga MX games. He has covered four FIFA World Cups, the 2003 Women’s World Cup, two Copa Américas and several UEFA European Championships.

Although he is best known for his football commentary, Ramos has an in-depth knowledge of all sports that has enabled him to be front and center of major sporting events across the world. These include broadcasting the Pan American Games, providing in-depth coverage of the 2000 Sydney Olympics and serving as the Spanish-language voice of the Los Angeles Lakers. One of the highlights of his career was providing play-by-play for the 1986 World Cup – the first-ever World Cup on Spanish-language radio in the U.S.

Ramos is also the spokesperson for National Automobile Parts Association (NAPA), having done commercials both in English and Spanish.

== Personal ==
Ramos is actively involved with the International Kids Fund, a philanthropic program of the Jackson Memorial Foundation committed to helping critically ill children.

Jorge lives in Miami with his wife, Maria Ramos. He has two adult children Carol & Diego.

== Experience ==
=== Radio ===
- KPLS 830 AM (1994-1998)
- Radio Unica (1998-2004)
- Univisión Radio (2004-2005)
- ESPN Deportes Radio (2005–2019)
- TUDN Radio (2025-present)

=== Television ===
- Telemundo (1994-2000)
- Univisión (2002-2006)
- Fox Sports en Español (2006-2009)
- ESPN Deportes (2009–present)
