= ESPN (Latin America) =

Pay television network

ESPN Latin America
- Broadcast area: Argentina; Bolivia; Chile; Colombia; Central America; Dominican Republic; Ecuador; Mexico; Paraguay; Peru; Uruguay; Venezuela
- Network: ESPN

Programming
- Language: Spanish

Ownership
- Owner: ESPN Inc. (operated by The Walt Disney Company Latin America through ESPN International)

History
- Launched: 31 March 1989; 37 years ago

Links
- Website: Official website

ESPN Latin America logo from 2013 to 2020 in the south feeds of ESPN spin-off channels

ESPN Latin America (on-air as ESPN) is the Latin American division of ESPN Inc., and broadcasts sports-related programming for the region in Spanish. It was launched on 31 March 1989. Its programming is adapted to the likes of viewers, who tend to prefer football and Hispanic baseball players to the more locally produced programs.

ESPN Latin America, unlike its U.S. sister channels, has more programs related to soccer and tennis.

The Disney/Hearst Corporation joint venture has also added some secondary regional channels for the Latin American region in the last few years, like ESPN2, ESPN3, ESPN4, ESPN5, ESPN6, ESPN7 and ESPN Premium.

In 2011, ESPN launched a new channel, named ESPN3, which is divided in four segments: Live (broadcasts live coverage of sport events), Compact (resumed sport events), ESPN 3.0 (extreme sports) and ESPN Series (featuring "30 For 30").

In November 2021, Disney announced that a new channel named ESPN 4 would be launched on December 1, 2021 (except in Argentina and Mexico) after Disney rebranded Fox Sports' main channel in Latin America with ESPN Premium, ESPN 4, ESPN 5, ESPN 6, ESPN 7 following on February 15, 2024, after Disney rebranded Fox Sports 1, ESPN Extra, ESPN 4, Fox Sports 2 and Fox Sports 3 respectively.

== Feeds ==
=== ESPN ===
- ESPN (Mexico) – available in Mexico
- ESPN (Central America) – available in Dominican Republic and Central America
- ESPN (Argentina) – available in Argentina
- ESPN (Chile) – available in Chile
- ESPN (Colombia) – available in Colombia, Ecuador and Venezuela
- ESPN (South) – available in Bolivia, Paraguay, Peru and Uruguay

=== ESPN 2 ===
- ESPN 2 (Mexico) – available in Mexico
- ESPN 2 (Central America) – available in Dominican Republic and Central America
- ESPN 2 (Argentina) – available in Argentina
- ESPN 2 (Chile) – available in Chile
- ESPN 2 (Colombia) – available in Colombia, Ecuador, and Venezuela
- ESPN 2 (South) – available in Bolivia, Paraguay, Peru and Uruguay

=== ESPN 3 ===
- ESPN 3 (Argentina) – available in Argentina
- ESPN 3 (North) – available in Dominican Republic, Central America and Mexico
- ESPN 3 (South) – available in Bolivia, Chile, Colombia, Ecuador, Paraguay, Peru, Uruguay and Venezuela

=== ESPN 4 ===
- ESPN 4 (Mexico) – available in Mexico
- ESPN 4 (Central America) – available in Dominican Republic and Central America
- ESPN 4 (South) – available in Argentina, Bolivia, Chile, Colombia, Ecuador, Paraguay, Peru, Uruguay and Venezuela

=== ESPN 5 ===
- ESPN 5 (Chile) – available in Chile
- ESPN 5 (Central America) – available in Central America and Dominican Republic
- ESPN 5 (South) – available in Bolivia, Colombia, Ecuador, Paraguay, Peru, Uruguay and Venezuela

=== ESPN 6 ===
- ESPN 6 – available in Bolivia, Chile, Colombia, Ecuador, Paraguay, Peru, Uruguay, Venezuela, Central America and Dominican Republic

=== ESPN 7 ===
- ESPN 7 – available in Bolivia, Chile, Colombia, Ecuador, Paraguay, Peru, Uruguay and Venezuela

=== ESPN Premium ===
- ESPN Premium (Argentina) – available in Argentina
- ESPN Premium (Chile) – available in Chile

== Sport events ==
List of events that can be viewed on ESPN Latin America Networks:

=== Football ===
- UEFA Champions League (Except Mexico)
- UEFA Women's Champions League (Except Mexico)
- UEFA Europa League (Except Central America)
- UEFA Conference League (Except Central America)
- UEFA Super Cup (Except Mexico)
- UEFA Youth League (Except Mexico)
- Copa Libertadores
- Copa Sudamericana
- Recopa Sudamericana
- Premier League (Only for South America)
- EFL Championship
- EFL League One
- EFL League Two
- La Liga (Only for South America)
- Serie A
- Bundesliga (Only for South America)
- 2. Bundesliga (Only for South America)
- Ligue 1 (Except Mexico)
- Eredivisie
- Süper Lig
- FA Cup (Only for South America)
- Women's FA Cup
- EFL Cup
- EFL Trophy
- FA Community Shield (Only for South America)
- Women's FA Community Shield
- FA Youth Cup
- Copa de la Reina de Fútbol
- Supercopa de España Femenina
- DFB-Pokal (Only for Mexico and Central America)
- DFL-Supercup (Only for South America)
- Trophée des Champions (Except Mexico)
- Taça da Liga (Only for Mexico and Central America)
- UEFA European Championship (Except Mexico)
- UEFA Women's Championship
- FIFA World Cup qualification (UEFA) (Except Mexico)
- FIFA Women's World Cup qualification (UEFA)
- UEFA European Championship qualifying (Except Mexico)
- UEFA Nations League (Except Mexico)
- UEFA Women's Championship qualifying
- UEFA European Under-21 Championship
- UEFA European Under-19 Championship
- UEFA Women's Under-19 Championship
- UEFA European Under-17 Championship
- UEFA Women's Under-17 Championship
- Under-20 Intercontinental
- UEFA Futsal Championship
- FIFA World Cup (Only for South America. Except Bolivia and Paraguay)
- FIFA Club World Cup (Only for South America. Except Bolivia)
- Copa do Brasil (Only for Mexico)
- Supercopa do Brasil (Only for Mexico)
- AFA Liga Profesional de Fútbol
- Supercopa Argentina
- Trofeo de Campeones de la Liga Profesional
- Supercopa Internacional
- Uruguayan Primera División
- Uruguayan Segunda División
- Supercopa Uruguaya
- Serie Rio de la Plata
- CONCACAF Gold Cup (Except Mexico)
- CONCACAF W Gold Cup
- CONCACAF W Gold Cup qualification
- CONCACAF W Championship
- CONCACAF W Championship qualification
- CONCACAF Champions Cup (Except Mexico)
- CONCACAF W Champions Cup
- CONCACAF Central American Cup (Except Mexico)
- CONCACAF Caribbean Cup (Except Mexico)
- CONCACAF Under-20 Championship
- CONCACAF Under-17 Championship
- CONCACAF Women's U-20 Championship
- CONCACAF Women's U-17 Championship
- National Women's Soccer League
- USL Championship
- USL Super League
- USL League One
- USL Cup
- Liga MX (Atlético San Luis, Atlante, Puebla and Santos home matches. (The last three only for Mexico and Central America))
- Liga MX Femenil (Atlético San Luis home matches)
- Liga de Expansión MX
- AFC Asian Cup
- AFC Women's Asian Cup
- FIFA World Cup qualification (AFC)
- AFC Champions League Elite
- AFC Women's Champions League
- AFC Champions League Two
- AFC U-23 Asian Cup
- AFC U-20 Asian Cup
- AFC U-17 Asian Cup
- AFC U-20 Women's Asian Cup
- AFC U-17 Women's Asian Cup
- AFC Futsal Asian Cup
- Kings World Cup Nations
- Kings World Cup Clubs
- Américas Kings League
- Américas Queens League

=== Multi-sport events ===
- Special Olympics World Games

=== Tennis ===
- Australian Open
- Roland Garros
- Wimbledon
- U.S. Open
- ATP Finals
- ATP 1000
- ATP 500
- ATP 250
- WTA Finals
- WTA 1000
- WTA 500
- WTA 250
- Next Generation ATP Finals
- Laver Cup

=== Badminton ===
- BWF World Championships
- Thomas Cup & Uber Cup
- Sudirman Cup
- BWF World Tour
- European Men's and Women's Team Badminton Championships

=== Basketball ===
- NBA
- WNBA
- NCAA basketball
- NBA Summer League
- NBA G League
- Athletes Unlimited Basketball
- Circuito de Baloncesto de la Costa del Pacífico

=== Baseball ===
- Major League Baseball
- World Baseball Classic
- Mexican League
- Colombian Professional Baseball League
- Little League World Series
- College baseball

=== Boxing ===
- ESPN Knockout

=== College Sports ===
- National Collegiate Athletic Association events

=== Cricket ===
- Cricket World Cup
- Women's Cricket World Cup
- ICC World Cup Qualifier
- ICC World Twenty20
- ICC Women's T20 World Cup
- ICC T20 World Cup Qualifier
- ICC Champions Trophy
- ICC Women's Champions Trophy
- ICC World Test Championship Final
- Under 19 Cricket World Cup
- Under-19 Women's T20 World Cup

=== Cycling ===
- Tour de France
- Tour de France Femmes
- Giro d'Italia (Only for Mexico and Central America)
- Vuelta a España
- La Vuelta Femenina
- Tour Down Under
- Paris–Nice
- Critérium du Dauphiné
- Tour of Armenia
- Tour Colombia
- Vuelta a El Salvador
- Volta Ciclista a Catalunya Femenina
- Tour of Flanders
- Paris–Roubaix
- Liège–Bastogne–Liège
- Omloop Het Nieuwsblad
- Gent–Wevelgem
- Dwars door Vlaanderen
- Amstel Gold Race
- La Flèche Wallonne
- Scheldeprijs
- Brabantse Pijl
- Brussels Cycling Classic
- Paris–Tours
- UCI Road World Championships (Only for Mexico and Central America)

=== Darts ===
- PDC World Darts Championship
- World Matchplay
- Grand Slam of Darts
- World Grand Prix

=== Field Hockey ===
- Women's FIH Hockey World Cup
- Men's FIH Hockey World Cup
- Women's FIH Pro League
- Men's FIH Pro League
- Women's FIH Hockey Olympic Qualifiers
- Men's FIH Hockey Olympic Qualifiers
- Women's EuroHockey Championship
- Men's EuroHockey Championship
- Women's FIH Hockey Junior World Cup
- Men's FIH Hockey Junior World Cup
- Women's Euro Hockey League
- Euro Hockey League
- Women's Indoor Hockey World Cup
- Men's Indoor Hockey World Cup
- FIH Women's Hockey5s World Cup
- FIH Men's Hockey5s World Cup

=== Golf ===
- The Masters
- PGA Championship
- U.S. Open
- The Open Championship
- PGA Tour
- PGA European Tour
- Presidents Cup
- Ryder Cup
- U.S. Women's Open
- Women's British Open
- U.S. Senior Open
- U.S. Senior Women's Open
- Senior Open
- Senior PGA Championship
- Walker Cup
- Curtis Cup
- Augusta National Women's Amateur
- The Amateur Championship
- The Women's Amateur Championship
- U.S. Amateur
- U.S. Women's Amateur
- U.S. Junior Amateur Golf Championship
- U.S. Girls' Junior Championship
- U.S. Adaptive Open
- Latin America Amateur Championship
- Asia-Pacific Amateur Championship
- Women's Asia-Pacific Amateur Championship

=== American football ===
- National Football League
- Liga de Fútbol Americano Profesional
- College Football

=== Horse racing ===
- Kentucky Derby
- Preakness Stakes
- Belmont Stakes
- Pegasus World Cup
- Saudi Cup
- Dubai World Cup
- Grand National
- Epsom Derby
- Prix de Diane
- Royal Ascot
- Eclipse Stakes
- Haskell Stakes
- King George VI and Queen Elizabeth Stakes
- Glorious Goodwood
- Whitney Stakes
- Fourstardave Handicap
- International Stakes
- Kentucky Turf Cup
- Kentucky Downs Turf Sprint Stakes
- Irish Champion Stakes
- Woodbine Mile
- Coolmore Turf Mile Stakes
- Prix de l'Arc de Triomphe
- Spinster Stakes
- British Champions Day
- Breeders' Cup
- Melbourne Cup
- Bahrain International
- Hong Kong International Races

=== Ice Hockey ===
- NHL

=== Marathon ===
- Seville Marathon
- Tokyo Marathon
- New York City Half Marathon
- Rotterdam Marathon
- Boston Marathon
- London Marathon
- Madrid Marathon
- Prague Marathon
- Stockholm Marathon
- Sydney Marathon
- Berlin Marathon
- Chicago Marathon
- Venice Marathon
- Frankfurt Marathon
- New York City Marathon
- Valencia Marathon

=== Mixed Martial Arts ===
- Legacy Fighting Alliance

=== Motor Sports ===
- Formula One (Except Mexico)
- FIA Formula 2 Championship (Except Mexico)
- FIA Formula 3 Championship (Except Mexico)
- F1 Academy (Except Mexico)
- Moto GP
- Moto 2
- Moto 3
- FIM Women's Motorcycling World Championship (Except Mexico)
- Superbike World Championship (Except Mexico)
- Supersport World Championship (Except Mexico)
- Sportbike World Championship (Except Mexico)
- Red Bull MotoGP Rookies Cup
- Asia Talent Cup
- Harley-Davidson Bagger World Cup
- Dakar Rally (Except Mexico)
- IndyCar Series
- Indy NXT
- Porsche Supercup (Except Mexico)
- Extreme H
- AMA Supersport Championship

=== Padel ===
- Padel World Championship
- Premier Padel
- Hexagon Cup
- Reserve Cup

=== Poker ===
- World Series of Poker

=== Polo ===
- Campeonato Argentino Abierto de Polo
- Campeonato Abierto de Hurlingham
- Campeonato Abierto del Tortugas Country Club
- U.S. Open Polo Championship
- Queen's Cup
- USPA Gold Cup
- Copa Cámara de Diputados
- Municipalidad del Pilar
- East Coast Open
- CW Whitney Cup
- Royal Windsor
- Coronation Cup
- Abierto de San Jorge
- Abierto Argentino Juvenil
- Torneo Metropolitano de Alto Handicap
- Copa Presidente
- World Polo League
- Copa de Las Naciones
- Abierto Argentino de Polo Femenino

=== Rugby ===
- Rugby World Cup
- Women's Rugby World Cup
- Nations Championship
- Nations Cup
- Six Nations Championship
- The Rugby Championship
- Rugby World Cup South America qualification
- Americas Rugby Championship
- World Rugby Pacific Nations Cup
- Super Rugby
- Top 14 (Only for South America)
- Super Rugby Americas
- Currie Cup
- National Provincial Championship
- WXV Global Series
- Women's Six Nations Championship
- Super Rugby Aupiki
- Farah Palmer Cup
- World Rugby Under 20 Championship
- World Rugby Under 20 Challenger Cup
- Six Nations Under 20s Championship
- Under 20s Rugby Championship
- SVNS
- Women's SVNS
- SVNS 2
- Top 14 de la URBA
- Nacional de Clubes
- Campeonato Uruguayo de Rugby
- Torneo del Interior
- Major League Rugby
- Test-matches

=== Skiing ===
- FIS Alpine World Ski Championships
- FIS Nordic World Ski Championships
- FIS Snowboard World Championships
- FIS Freestyle World Ski Championships
- FIS Alpine Ski World Cup
- FIS Cross-Country World Cup
- FIS Freestyle Ski World Cup
- FIS Nordic Combined World Cup
- FIS Ski Jumping World Cup
- FIS Snowboard World Cup

=== Softball ===
- Mexican Softball League

=== Triathlon ===
- Ironman World Championship
- Ironman Pro Series

=== Volleyball ===
- Women's European Volleyball Championship
- Men's European Volleyball Championship
- LOVB Pro
- Athletes Unlimited Volleyball

=== Weightlifting ===
- World Weightlifting Championships

=== Yachting ===
- America's Cup
- America's Cup Qualifiers and Challenger Playoffs
- America's Cup World Series
- Women's America's Cup
- Youth America's Cup

== Personalities ==
=== Northern feed ===
- (Mexico) Javier Alarcón
- (United States) (Mexico) Cristina Alexander
- (Mexico) Eitán Benezra
- (Mexico) Jared Borgetti
- (Mexico) José Briseño
- (Mexico) Eduardo Brizio
- (Mexico) César Caballero
- (Mexico) Tlatoani Carrera
- (Mexico) Mario Carrillo
- (Mexico) Ruth Carrillo
- (United States) (Mexico) Katia Castorena
- (Mexico) Guillermo Celis
- (Mexico) Rigoberto Cervantez
- (Mexico) Julio César Chávez
- (Mexico) Odín Ciani
- (Mexico) Kary Correa
- (Mexico) Francisco Gabriel de Anda
- (Mexico) Iván del Ángel Díaz
- (Mexico) Eugenio Díaz
- (Mexico) Sergio Dipp
- (Mexico) Dionisio Estrada
- (Mexico) José Ramón Fernández
- (Mexico) Marcelino Fernández del Castillo
- (Mexico) Adalberto Franco
- (Mexico) Arantxa Garza
- (Mexico) Roberto Gómez Junco
- (Mexico) Jaime "Jimmy" González
- (Mexico) Miguel González
- (Mexico) Julia Headley
- (Mexico) Rebeca Landa
- (Mexico) Marisa Lara
- (Mexico) León Lecanda
- (Mexico) Jesús Humberto López
- (Mexico) Juan Manuel Márquez
- (Mexico) Gustavo Mendoza
- (Mexico) Jorge Carlos Mercader
- (Mexico) Desirée Monsiváis
- (Mexico) Heriberto Murrieta
- (Mexico) Bernardo Osuna
- (Mexico) Miguel Pasquel
- (Mexico) Mauricio Pedroza
- (Mexico) Ricardo Peláez
- (Mexico) Juank Pérez
- (Mexico) Pilar Pérez
- (Mexico) Jorge Pietrasanta
- (Mexico) Alex Pombo
- (Mexico) Ciro Procuna
- (Mexico) Ramiro Pruneda
- (Mexico) Ricardo Puig
- (Mexico) Yael Romero
- (Mexico) Antonio Rodríguez
- (Mexico) Hugo Sánchez
- (Mexico) Jorge Eduardo Sánchez
- (Mexico) José Luis Sánchez Solá
- (Mexico) John Sutcliffe
- (Mexico) Karen Tapia
- (Mexico) Gustavo Tella
- (Mexico) Fernando Tirado
- (Mexico) Javier Trejo Garay
- (Mexico) Ismael Valdez
- (Mexico) Antonio Valle
- (Mexico) Eduardo Varela
- (Mexico) Pablo Viruega
- (Argentina) Andrés Agulla
- (Argentina) Axel Jürgens
- (Argentina) Daniel Martínez
- (Argentina) Delfina Moyano
- (Argentina) Francisco "Paco" Alemán
- (Argentina) Hernán Pereyra
- (Argentina) Hernán Rey
- (Argentina) José Luis Clerc
- (Argentina) Leopoldo González
- (Argentina) Mario Alberto Kempes
- (Argentina) (Spain) Martín Ainstein
- (Argentina) Ricardo Ortiz
- (Argentina) Sebastián Martínez Christensen
- (Argentina) Silvia Bertolaccini
- (Brazil) Flavio Pereira
- (Brazil) (Mexico) Ricardo Ferretti
- (Colombia) Óscar Restrepo
- (Colombia) (Mexico) Claudia Trejos
- (Dominican Republic) Enrique Rojas
- (Dominican Republic) Ernesto Jerez
- (El Salvador) Fernando Palomo
- (El Salvador) Roger Valdivieso
- (Guatemala) (Mexico) Álvaro Morales
- (Israel) (Mexico) Barak Fever
- (Peru) Fernando Valdizán
- (Spain) Manuel "Manú" Martín
- (United States) (Colombia) Alba Galindo
- (United States) (Colombia) Kenneth Garay
- (United States) (Mexico) Herculez Gomez
- (United States) (Mexico) Carlos Nava
- (United States) (Mexico) Jerry Olaya
- (United States) (Puerto Rico) Alfredo Lomeli
- (United States) (Puerto Rico) Michelle LaFountain
- (Uruguay) Robert Sierra
- (Venezuela) Carolina Guillén
- (Venezuela) Carolina Padrón
- (Venezuela) Fernando Álvarez
- (Venezuela) Luis Alfredo Álvarez
- (Venezuela) Nicolás Pereira
- (Venezuela) Richard Méndez

=== Southern feed ===
- (Argentina) Damián Trillini
- (Argentina) Daniel Retamozo
- (Argentina) Miguel Simón
- (Argentina) Jorge Barril
- (Argentina) Juan Manuel Pons
- (Argentina) Julián Fernández
- (Argentina) Facundo Quiroga
- (Argentina) Germán Sosa
- (Argentina) Hernán de Lorenzi
- (Argentina) Quique Wolff
- (Argentina) Alejandro Coccia
- (Argentina) Pablo Ferreira
- (Argentina) Javier Frana
- (Argentina) Juan Ignacio "Juani" Guillem
- (Argentina) Pablo Stecco
- (Argentina) Mercedes "Mechi" Margalot
- (Argentina) Marcelo Espina
- (Argentina) Martín Ponte
- (Argentina) Matias Sanchez
- (Argentina) Mauricio Gallardo
- (Argentina) Juan Pablo Alessandrini
- (Argentina) Diego Monroig
- (Argentina) Facundo Quiroga
- (Argentina) Manuel Contemponi
- (Argentina) Fabián Taboada
- (Argentina) Agostina Larocca
- (Argentina) Ignacio Meroni
- (Argentina) Alfredo Conrad
- (Argentina) Esteban Lasala
- (Argentina) Tomás de Vedia
- (Argentina) Carolina Losada
- (Argentina) Carlos Irusta
- (Argentina) Guillermo Poggi
- (Argentina) Javier Gil Navarro
- (Argentina) Marcelo López
- (Argentina) Mario Sabato
- (Argentina) Martín Garrahan
- (Argentina) Juan Marconi
- (Argentina) Miguel Granados
- (Argentina) Juan Szafrán
- (Argentina) Esteban Lasala
- (Argentina) Tony Peña
- (Argentina) Alejandro Klappenbach
- (Argentina) Gustavo Morea
- (Argentina) Gustavo Sgalla
- (Argentina) Juan Ignacio "Juani" Chela
- (Argentina) Nati Jota
- (Argentina) Nicolás Hueto
- (Argentina) Andrea Schettino
- (Argentina) Alejandro Ruzal
- (Argentina) Norberto Laterza
- (Argentina) Natalia Botti
- (Argentina) Victor Pochat
- (Argentina) Martín Urruty
- (Argentina) Fernando Carlos
- (Argentina) Mariano Ryan
- (Argentina) Martín Altberg
- (Argentina) Matías Sánchez
- (Argentina) Marcelo Durán
- (Argentina) Diego Albanese
- (Argentina) Eduardo Simone
- (Argentina) Leo Montero
- (Argentina) Daniel Tílger
- (Argentina) Diego Cánepa
- (Argentina) Francisco Cánepa
- (Argentina) Morena Beltrán
- (Argentina) Pablo Pons
- (Argentina) Pablo Schillaci
- (Argentina) Raúl Barceló
- (Argentina) Sebastián Porto
- (Colombia) Andrés Lacouture
- (Colombia) Andrés Marocco
- (Colombia) Fabián Vargas
- (Colombia) Faustino Asprilla
- (Colombia) Jorge Bermudez
- (Colombia) Víctor Romero
- (Italy) Vito De Palma
- (Uruguay) Diego Muñoz
- (Argentina) Christian Martin
- (Argentina) Matias Martin
- (Argentina) Martín Souto
- (Argentina) Martín Liberman
- (Argentina) Maximo Palma
- (Argentina) Agostina Scalise
- (Argentina) Agustina Casanova
- (Argentina) Alina Moine
- (Argentina) Sofía Martínez
- (Argentina) Agustina Vidal
- (Argentina) Lola del Carril
- (Argentina) Stefanía Casero
- (Argentina) Florencia Romero
- (Chile) Grace Lazcano
- (Chile) Monserrat Grau
- (Chile) Rafael Olarra
- (Chile) Mauricio Pinilla
- (Chile) Pablo Ramos
- (Colombia) Natalia Álvarez
- (Colombia) Lizet Durán
- (Colombia) Melissa Martínez
- (Colombia) Nicole Regnier
- (Colombia) Diana Rincón
- (Colombia) Laura Ruiz
- (Colombia) Paula Salamanca
- (Colombia) Juliana Salazar
- (Ecuador) José Daniel Álvarez
- (Ecuador) Gisella Buendía
- (Ecuador) Karolina Dávila
- (Ecuador) William Dávila
- (Ecuador) Fanny González
- (Ecuador) (Italy) Luigi Marchelle
- (Ecuador) Doménica Rodríguez
- (Ecuador) Soledad Rodríguez
- (Ecuador) Andrés Villamarín
- (Peru) Franco Lostaunau
- (Spain) Moises Llorens
- (Spain) Mirela Roig
- (Spain) Gemma Soler
- (Venezuela) Geraldine Carrasquero
- (Brazil) Natalie Gedra

== See also ==
- ESPN (Brazil)
- Latin American sports television broadcast contracts
- Star+
