= Francisco Gabriel de Anda =

Mexican footballer and sports analyst (born 1971)

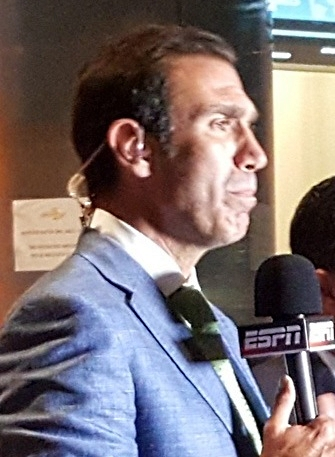

Personal information
- Full name: José Francisco Gabriel de Anda
- Date of birth: 5 June 1971 (age 55)
- Place of birth: Mexico City, Mexico
- Height: 1.88 m (6 ft 2 in)
- Position: Defender

Youth career
- 1976–1985: América
- 1985–1991: UNAM

Senior career*
Years	Team	Apps	(Gls)
1993–1995	UAT	27	(1)
1995–1998	Santos Laguna	96	(7)
1998–2000	Cruz Azul	56	(6)
2000–2005	Pachuca	202	(22)
2006–2007	Santos Laguna	42	(1)
Total		423	(37)

International career
1997–2002	Mexico	13	(2)
- * Club domestic league appearances and goals

José Francisco Gabriel de Anda (born 5 June 1971) is a Mexican former professional footballer who currently works for ESPN Deportes and ESPN Mexico as an analyst.

== Club career ==
He played for several clubs, including Santos Laguna, Cruz Azul, Pachuca and Correcaminos

== International career ==
He played for the Mexico national football team and was a participant at the 2002 FIFA World Cup.

== Personal life ==
Contrary to popular belief, his given name is "Francisco", and his last names are "Gabriel" and "de Anda". This confusion happens because Gabriel is a common given name.

Gabriel de Anda currently works for ESPN Deportes and ESPN Mexico as an analyst.

His brother, Juan Carlos Gabriel de Anda, is also a sports analyst and has worked for FOX and ESPN.

== Career statistics ==
=== International goals ===
No.	Date	Venue	Opponent	Score	Result	Competition	Ref.
1.	March 18, 1998	Estadio Azteca, Mexico City, Mexico	Paraguay	1–1	1–1	Friendly	
2.	April 17, 2002	Giants Stadium, East Rutherford, United States	Bulgaria	1–0	1–0	Friendly	

== Honours ==
Santos Laguna

- Mexican Primera División: Invierno 1996

Pachuca

- Mexican Primera División: Invierno 2001, Apertura 2003
- CONCACAF Champions' Cup: 2002

Mexico

- CONCACAF Gold Cup: 1998
