= Adriana Monsalve =

Venezuelan journalist

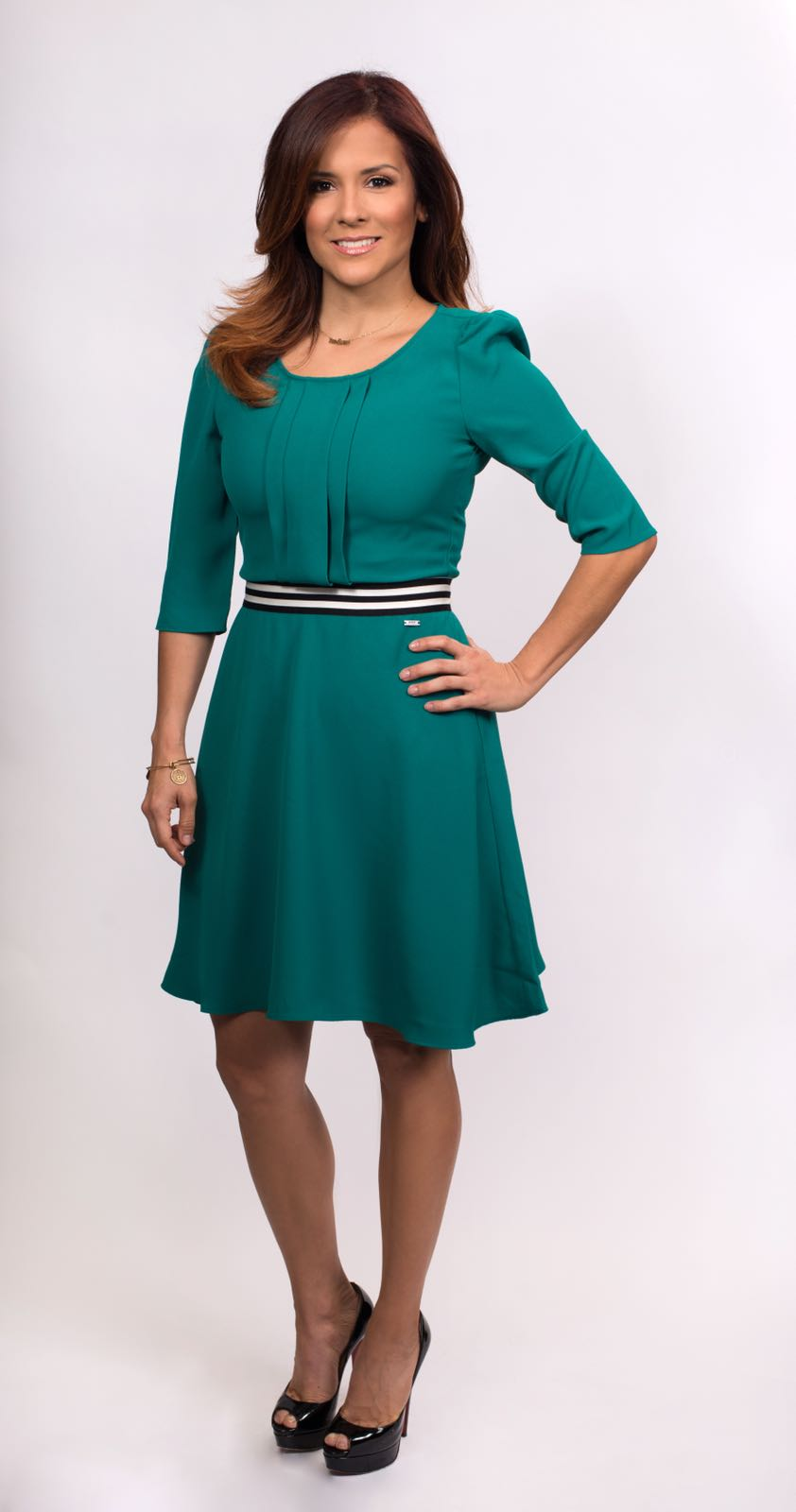
- Born: Adriana Monsalve; July 27, 1977 (age 48); Caracas, Venezuela
- Occupations: Sportscaster; Journalist; Television host
- Years active: 2005–present

Adriana Monsalve (born July 27, 1977) is a Venezuelan sportscaster, journalist who formerly worked for TUDN.

== Career ==
Monsalve became famous as the lead singer in the girl band "Chikas" and in the pop bands "Tartara" in Venezuela, and "Latin Fiesta" in London, England. She also hosted the TV morning show "Aló RCTV" in Caracas for more than a year. In 2002, she moved to the United States, where she has participated in many commercials and stage productions such as "Esther" at the Tampa Bay Performing Arts Center.

Soon after, she became the Hispanic Spokesperson for furniture giant "Rooms to Go". In 2005, when she was hired to be the sports anchor for the 6:00 pm newscast of Orlando's Telemundo local affiliate.

In 2007, Monsalve was hired by ESPN as sports anchor of ESPN Deportes broadcasting for Sports' Center Hispanic viewers in North America, and also through ESPN 2 Central and South America. On November 28, 2014, she announced she was leaving ESPN, and later revealed she was joining Univision Deportes, now rebranded as TUDN. In 2023 she left after her contract was not renewed.

== Jobs ==
- Alo RCTV (2000 - 2002)
- Theatrical productions como Esther (2003)
- Rooms to Go (2004 - 2005)
- Telemundo (2005 - 2007)
- ESPN SportsCenter (2007 - 2010)
- ESPN Nación ESPN (2011 - 2014)
- Univision Deportes (2015 - 2018)
- Televisa Deportes (2018–2023)
- TUDN (2018–2023)
