= Ciro Procuna =

Mexican sports announcer

Ciro Procuna Naveda is a Mexican sports announcer for ESPN Deportes (ESPN in Spanish in the United States). He is the presenter of Futbol Picante and NFL Semanal. Procuna has also worked as co-host on SportsCenter on ESPN in Spanish.
