= David Faitelson =

Mexican-Israeli sports journalist

- דוד פייטלסון
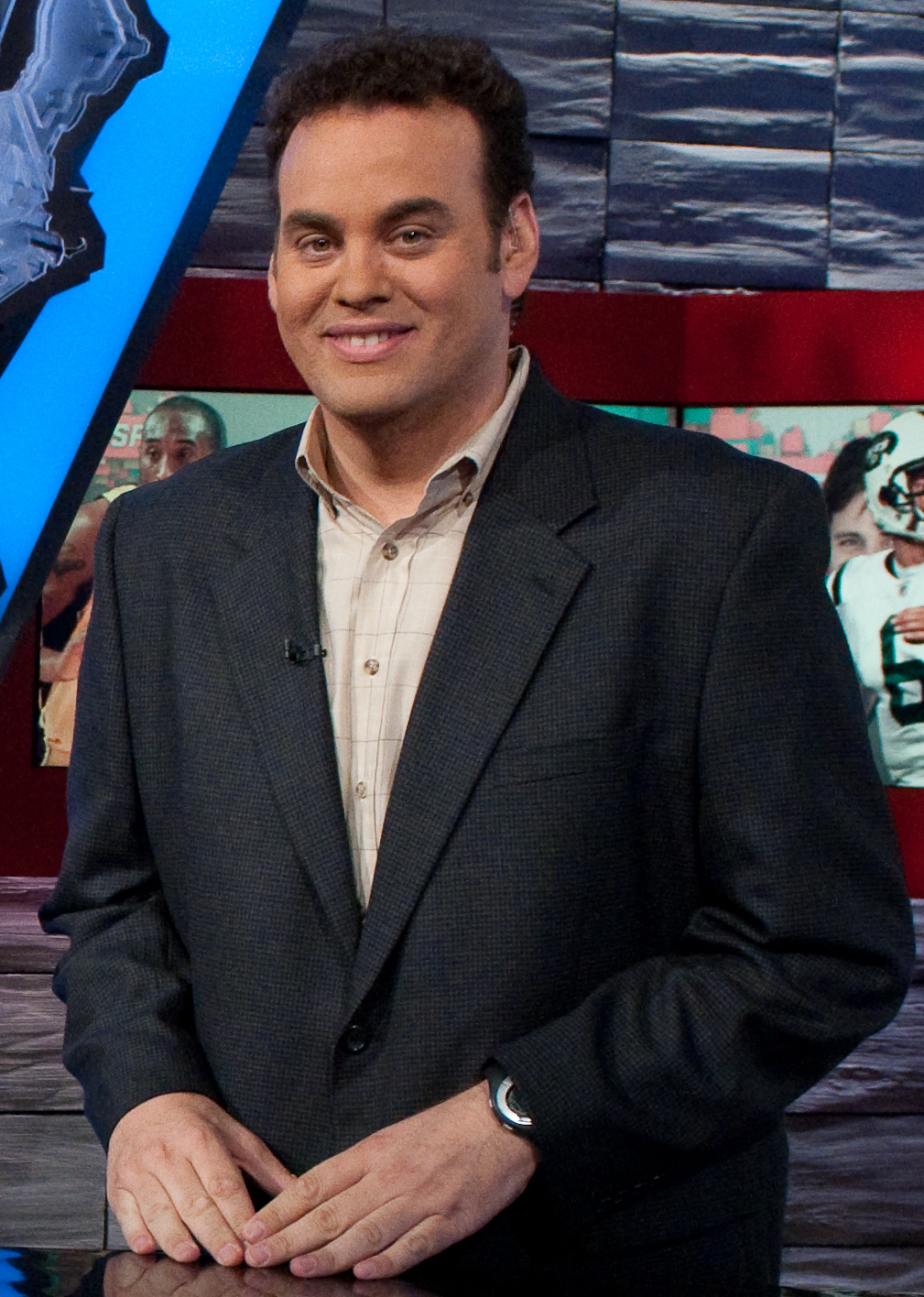
- Faitelson in SportsNation/Nación ESPN in 2010
- Born: David Moshé Faitelson Pulido; November 8, 1968 (age 58); Kokhav Michael, Israel
- Education: Lic. in Communication
- Alma mater: National Autonomous University of Mexico
- Occupation: Journalist
- Employer: TUDN (since 2023)
- Spouse: Irene Gattegno
- Children: 3

David Moshé Faitelson Pulido (born November 8, 1968) is an Israeli-born Mexican sports journalist who currently works for TUDN. He lives in Mexico City and is married and has three daughters. Born in Ascalon, Israel to a Mexican Jewish father and a Catholic Cuban mother, grew up in Israel until the age of 8 years old, when the family came back to Mexico City, where he was raised and studied.

== TV debut ==
Faitelson and José Ramón Fernández jointly formed a sport show in Mexico, called DeporTV. In between his stay at TV Azteca, Faitelson covered the World Cup 1986 in Mexico, the 1991 Pan American Games in Cuba for Mexico, the World Cup 1994 in the United States, the World Cup 1998 in France, the World Cup 2002 in South Korea and Japan, and the World Cup 2006 held in Germany. Faitelson also covered each of the Summer Olympics from 1988 to 2012.

== Recent years ==
After the 2006 FIFA World Cup, Faitelson was one of several journalists who moved to sports specific channels. Along with other DeporTV analysts, he joined ESPN Deportes. As of 2011 he covered Mexican football, baseball, boxing the Olympics, and other sports. He was involved in shows such as Fútbol Picante, SportsCenter, Cronómetro, and Nación ESPN.

== "El Color" ==
Faitelson is known for his dramatic, inspirational reports on the colorful side of the sport. "El Color" is his trademark and is the best-received of Faitelson's journalism work. He authored several articles. His work includes interviews with athletes such as Lance Armstrong, Carl Lewis, Julio César Chávez, Pelé, Diego Armando Maradona, and Nadia Comăneci.

He wrote a memoir called 20 Años de Pasión y Polémica.
