= ESPN Deportes =

American Spanish-language sports TV channel

- Country: United States
- Broadcast area: Worldwide
- Headquarters: Bristol, Connecticut; Los Angeles, California; Mexico City, Mexico

Programming
- Language: Spanish
- Picture format: 720p HDTV (480i, letterboxed for the SDTV feed)

Ownership
- Owner: The Walt Disney Company (72%; via ABC Inc.); Hearst Communications (18%); National Football League (10%)
- Parent: ESPN
- Sister channels: ABC; ESPN; ESPN (streaming service); ESPN+; ESPN2; ESPNews; ESPNU; ACC Network; SEC Network; NFL Network; NFL RedZone

History
- Launched: January 7, 2004; 22 years ago

Links
- Website: espndeportes.espn.com

Availability

Streaming media
- ESPN app: Live simulcast (US pay-TV subscribers only)
- DirecTV Stream, FuboTV, Hulu with Live TV, Sling TV, YouTube TV

ESPN Deportes (Spanish pronunciation: [i.espiˈen deˈpoɾtes], lit. 'ESPN Sports') is an American multinational Spanish-language pay television sports channel owned by ESPN, a joint venture between The Walt Disney Company (which owns a controlling 72% stake via indirect subsidiary ABC Inc.), Hearst Communications (which owns 18%) and the National Football League (which owns 10%). The network is aimed primarily at the Hispanic community in the United States. The channel broadcasts from studio facilities at ESPN's traditional bases of operations in Los Angeles and Bristol, Connecticut along with their Mexican base in Mexico City.

ESPN Deportes is available on most pay-television providers including Charter Communications, Cox Communications, Comcast, DirecTV, Dish Network, Optimum Communications and U-verse TV. According to Nielsen, ESPN Deportes is available to at least 5.5 million Hispanic households in the United States through a programming package that includes the channel. Conversely, ESPN does not maintain second audio program audio feeds on any of their English-language channels in the United States (except for ABC's SAP Spanish coverage for the NBA Finals), allowing full exclusivity to ESPN Deportes for the Spanish rights to their properties.

== History ==
ESPN Deportes launched as an alternate Spanish-language programming feed in July 2001, when ESPN and Major League Baseball began offering Spanish-language telecasts of the Home Run Derby and select Sunday Night Baseball game telecasts. By 2003, this simulcast was expanded to all Sunday Night Baseball and Sunday Night Football game broadcasts, as well as boxing.

ESPN Deportes became a separate 24-hour sports subscription channel on January 7, 2004. In 2007, ESPN Deportes began producing a daily English language segment featured during the overnight editions of its American parent network's SportsCenter program, hosted by Michele LaFountain and several other personalities. ESPN Deportes launched a 720p high definition simulcast feed in April 2011, though as many American Spanish-language cable network packages remain with the majority of networks in standard definition, ESPN Deportes maintains their "BottomLine" news ticker in a form designed for 4:3 sets, matching the form seen on ESPN Classic and ESPN on ABC broadcasts. However, as of 2016, the BottomLine ticker has since expanded to the 16:9 design used by the other ESPN networks.

On December 7, 2015, the network debuted its new four-studio production facility in Mexico City with the Spanish version of SportsCenter. Jorge Eduardo Sánchez and Carolina Padrón anchored the first SportsCenter from the new studios which also featured well-known Mexican journalist José Ramón Fernández interviewing Mexican soccer coaches Tomás Boy and Miguel Herrera. On January 4, 2016, the network moved all their shows produced in Mexico to the new facilities, including Fútbol Picante, Los Capitanes and Cronómetro.

== Programming ==
=== Current programming ===
==== Studio programs ====
- SportsCenter – Based on the format of the flagship U.S. program, it is an hour-long program featuring the day's scores and highlights from major sporting events, along with commentary, analysis, previews, and feature stories. The ESPN Deportes version focuses mostly on culturally relevant sports news and stories, and offers in-depth analysis and highlights aimed at Hispanic viewers.
- Fútbol Picante – A roundtable discussion program featuring a panel of journalists discussing the day's soccer headlines and scores. Co-hosted by José Ramón Fernández and former players Hugo Sánchez, Roberto Gómez Junco, and Francisco Gabriel de Anda, the program focuses specifically on the Liga MX and the Mexico national team; regular commentators on the program include Jared Borgetti, Mario Carrillo, Dionisio Estrada, Héctor Huerta, Gustavo Mendoza, Javier Alarcón, Ricardo Ferretti, Ricardo Peláez, Álvaro Morales, Adalberto Franco, Sergio Dipp, Jorge Pietrasanta, Ciro Procuna, Ricardo Puig, Felipe Ramos Rizo, and John Sutcliffe.
- Cronómetro – A news program featuring discussion and debates on Latino sports and sports stars; it is hosted by David Faitelson and José Ramón Fernández, with Eduardo Varela, Ricardo Puig, Pablo Viruega, Alvaro Morales and Jorge Carlos Mercader serving as contributors. The program is based on the format of Pardon the Interruption.
- Los Capitanes – An hour-long afternoon sports highlight program, co-hosted by Jose Ramon Fernandez, with Rafael Puente, Hector Huerta and Roberto Gómez Junco; Jared Borgetti, Francisco Gabriel de Anda, Ricardo Puig, Jorge Pietrasanta and other analysts serve as contributors.
- Ahora o Nunca – A late-night program that offers a new take on sports with a laid-back vibe. The co-hosts have fun with sports headlines and reactions, chat about the latest news on movies, music, E Sports, celebrity culture and more. The shows feature social content that incorporates viewer interaction and engagement. The show airs at 2 a.m. ET / 11 p.m. PT and is hosted by Herculez Gomez, Mauricio Pedroza and Janelle Marie Rodriguez.
- Fútbol Center – A short-form soccer-focused program (including coverage of leagues such as Liga MX, La Liga, Bundesliga, Ligue 1, Serie A, and the Premier League); airing weekends. It is hosted by Cristina Alexander (Saturdays) and Ricardo Puig (Sundays); analysts include Jared Borgetti, Mario Carrillo, Eugenio Diaz, and various journalists based in the ESPN studios in Bristol.
- ESPN AM – A program where various analysts discuss the sports topics of the day, mainly everything related to Mexican soccer and share the agenda of the day through a fresh, creative and casual show that accompany the fans every morning. The show is hosted by Alvaro Morales, with Sergio Dipp, Adalberto Franco and Gabriela Bibayoff serving as contributors.
- A los Golpes – A boxing news and analysis program hosted by Juan Manuel Márquez and Jorge Eduardo Sánchez. The show airs Saturdays.
- NFL Esta Noche – An NFL pre-game show preceding ESPN Deportes' coverage of Monday Night Football, which also features highlights and analysis of the previous Sunday's NFL action and live reports; it is hosted by Eduardo Varela and Pablo Viruega.
- NFL Live – Produced in ESPN's studios in Mexico City, the show is an NFL studio show based on the format of the English-language version of the show. The show features former NFL Europe players Marco Martos, Mauricio Lopez Chavez, Gustavo Tella, and Jaime “Jimmy” Gonzalez along with journalists Miguel Pasquel and Kary Correa. The show also regularly has the participation of other ESPN Spanish-language NFL experts including John Sutcliffe, Raul Allegre, Eduardo Varela, Pablo Viruega, and Ciro Procuna, among others. Unlike in Mexico where it airs weekdays throughout the year, the show only airs on Saturday mornings during the NFL season on ESPN Deportes.

== Sporting events ==
The network has the rights to show all the events listed below but some do not air on the network due to scheduling conflicts, instead they are streamed online in Spanish on ESPN.com and the ESPN App.

=== Soccer ===
England

- FA Cup
- FA Community Shield

Spain

- La Liga
- Copa del Rey
- Supercopa de España

Germany

- DFB-Pokal

UEFA

- UEFA Women's Champions League

United States

- NWSL

CONCACAF

- CONCACAF W Champions Cup

=== American football ===
National Football League (NFL)

- Super Bowl (games aired on ABC)
- One Divisional playoff game
- One Wild Card playoff game
- Monday Night Football
- Pro Bowl
- NFL draft

College Football

- College Football Playoff: Championship Game, Cotton Bowl, Fiesta Bowl, Orange Bowl, Peach Bowl, Rose Bowl, and Sugar Bowl
- ACC, Big 12, MAC, SEC, Sun Belt
- Bowl games

Other

- United Football League

=== Baseball ===
Major League Baseball (MLB)

- Regular season

Others

- Caribbean Series
- Little League World Series

=== Basketball ===
National Basketball Association (NBA)

- NBA Finals
- NBA playoffs
- Regular season
- NBA Draft

Women's National Basketball Association (WNBA)

- WNBA Finals
- WNBA playoffs
- Regular season
- WNBA draft

Others

- NCAA Division I women's basketball tournament

=== Golf ===
- Masters Tournament

=== Ice hockey ===
National Hockey League (NHL)

- Stanley Cup Final (Years aired on ABC)
- Stanley Cup playoffs
- ESPN Hockey Night
- NHL Stadium Series (Years aired on ABC)
- NHL All-Star Game

=== Mixed martial arts ===
- Professional Fighters League
- Legacy Fighting Alliance

=== Motorsports ===
- Formula E (from 2026-27 onwards)

=== Multi-sport events ===
- X Games

=== Professional wrestling ===
World Wrestling Entertainment (WWE)

- Select Premium Live Events

=== Tennis ===
- Grand Slam: Australian Open, Wimbledon, U.S. Open

== ESPN Deportes Radio ==
ESPN Deportes Radio launched on October 5, 2005, as the only 24-hour Spanish-language radio network aimed at U.S. Hispanic sports fans. Since its launch, the radio network has grown to include 45 affiliates nationwide, reaching close to 80% of the Hispanic population in the United States. The network is also available on SiriusXM, and is streamed on the ESPN Deportes Radio mobile app for iOS and Android devices, and on ESPNDeportesRadio.com.

In addition to broadcasting live sports events, the radio network features various sports news and analysis programs (such as the soccer analysis program Jorge Ramos y su Banda; sports news program Raza Deportiva; morning drive talk show ESPN al Despertar; and the boxing news program A los Golpes).

ESPN has also operated radio networks, stations and programs in Latin America:

- ESPN 107.9 FM (Argentina; 2010–2018)
- ESPN Radio en Rivadavia (Argentina; 2002–2014)
- ESPN Radio Fórmula (Mexico; 2006–present)
- ESPN Radio - Bío-Bío Deportes (Chile; 2007–2011)
- Rádio Eldorado ESPN (Brazil; 2007–2011)
- Rádio Estadão ESPN (Brazil; 2011–2013)
- ESPN Rádio Capital (Brazil; 2013–2014)
- ESPN Rádio City (Brazil; 2014–2015)

== ESPN Deportes.com ==
Launched in September 2000, ESPNDeportes.com covers more than 20 different sports with news, statistics, analysis and real-time scores aimed at U.S. and Latin American readers. The website also features video and audio content; fantasy games; live event webcasts; live chats with players, ESPN experts and other sports personalities; enterprise journalism; user-generated content including message boards and "conversations", with fans able to post comments on selected news items and blogs.

== ESPN Deportes La Revista ==
ESPN Deportes La Revista is a monthly Spanish-language magazine first published in August 2005, and distributed in conjunction with Grupo GW. ESPN Deportes La Revista offers a mix of original content targeted to the interests of U.S. Hispanics, as well as material from the English-language publication ESPN: The Magazine. The editorial section covers sports such as Major League Baseball, as well as winter baseball from the Dominican Republic, Mexico, Puerto Rico and Venezuela; boxing; the NFL; international soccer; auto racing; and action sports. A digital edition of La Revista is available through Zinio.

== ESPN Deportes+ ==
Events not carried on TV in the Spanish language are carried on ESPN Deportes+, an ESPN Deportes-branded section of the ESPN3 service.
