= East Coast bias =

Perceived sports coverage bias

East Coast bias is the perceived tendency for sports broadcasting and journalism in the United States to give greater weight and attention to teams and athletes on the East Coast than those in the Midwest or on the West Coast. In Canada, a similar bias is perceived but the area given greater weight and attention is the provinces of Ontario and Quebec, which are mostly in the same time zone as the East Coast of the U.S., as the East Coast of Canada includes the provinces of New Brunswick, Prince Edward Island, Nova Scotia and Newfoundland and Labrador, which collectively have only about 2.5 million residents, compared to the combined population of over 23.5 million of Ontario and Quebec, which is 61% of Canada's population. In Canada, the East Coast bias is referred to as the "Laurentian Elite" for its geographical location on the St. Lawrence Seaway - particularly regarding media and league head offices in Toronto and Montreal who have periodically not had regional sports offices outside of those two locations.

== Overview ==
East Coast bias is used to explain perceived slights of teams and players in the Midwest or on the West Coast relative to their comparable counterparts on the East. It is attributed to East Coast sports stories being more repetitive, comprehensive, and exaggerated. "In America news still travels from east to west," wrote author George Will in Men at Work: The Craft of Baseball. The bias is also used to rationalize the broadcasting of an East Coast team in favor of another compelling team based to the west.

National coverage of live games is also perceived as favoring certain teams located on the Eastern side of the continent. For example, critics of what Hockey Night in Canada chose to program allege that the show particularly favored the Toronto Maple Leafs. The first national sports network, TSN, is often referred to as the Toronto Sports Network. Likewise, ESPN's baseball coverage has been the target of criticism because of its perceived bias towards the Boston Red Sox and the New York Yankees.

== Causes ==
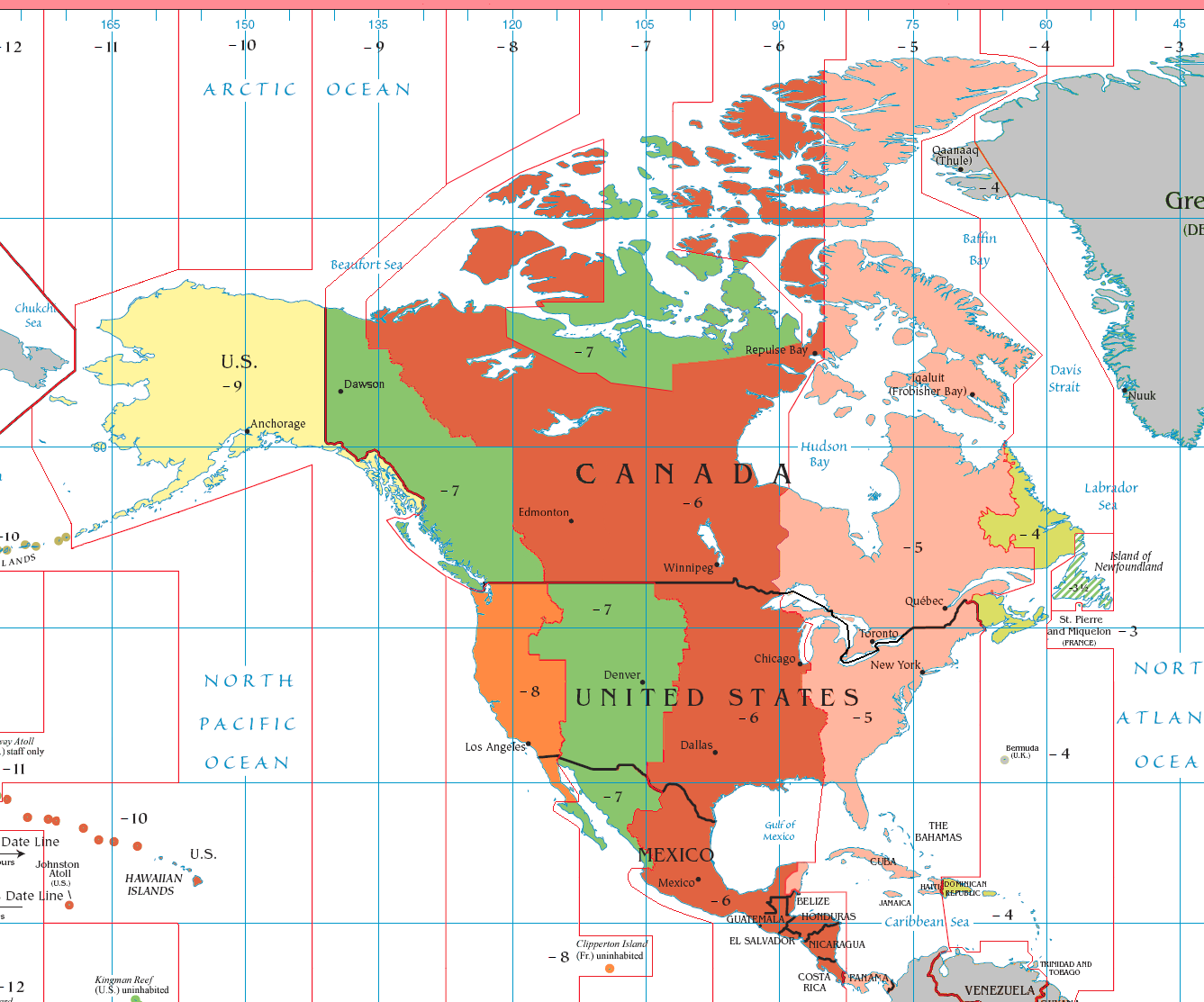
Time zone map of North America

The North American continent is divided into seven time zones, spanning 6 1/2 hours from Alaska to Newfoundland. Most of the continent's population (including all of the major professional sports teams) is concentrated in the four time zones of the contiguous United States and Canada west of the Maritimes; this, however, still poses a significant obstacle in that the easternmost sports teams are a full three hours ahead of their western counterparts. For sports that play in prime time according to local time zones (as is the case with ice hockey, baseball, and basketball), this can result in games played on the West Coast starting after 10 p.m. Eastern time (and not ending until around or after 1 a.m.), while the East is sleeping and after printing deadlines for the next day's newspapers have passed; the latter has become less of a factor in the newspaper industry in the 2020s, due to printing plant consolidation and several chains switching from carrier delivery to mail delivery. Gennaro Filice of SI.com wrote that Major League Baseball's West Coast night games are ending as "the country's most influential scribes are catching Z after Z." John Buccigross of ESPN notes that a lot of people in the East are asleep when the National Hockey League's West Coast night games are going on, resulting in lower television ratings for those West Coast games, which in turn contributes to the lack of national broadcasts of West games.

In the United States, the major media hub is the East Coast city of New York. CBS Sports has its headquarters within the Manhattan borough of the city, and NBC Sports, MLB Network, and NHL Network all have their hubs in the metropolitan area (NBC is based in Stamford, Connecticut, while MLB/NHL share the former studios of MSNBC in Secaucus, New Jersey); ESPN is in Bristol, Connecticut, which is roughly equidistant to both New York and Boston. Meanwhile, TNT Sports (the former Turner Sports) is based in Atlanta, the capital of the East Coast state of Georgia. Canada's two major media hubs, Toronto (for English-language media) and Montreal (for French-language media), are also both located in the Eastern Time Zone, with the Pacific Time Zone city of Vancouver serving as a secondary programming hub.

The NFL Network and Fox Sports including its cable channel Fox Sports 1 maintain their major broadcast hub in Los Angeles, along with the Pac-12 Networks in San Francisco, though FS1 and the Pac-12 Network's sports rights are limited to the point where they are thought of as an aberration (and Fox Sports itself is the major broadcast partner for college basketball's East Coast-centric Big East Conference). Buccigross wrote that an imbalance is understandable from Eastern writers, considering they are influenced by their close proximity and easier access to the happenings in the East. The East is home to nearly half of the U.S.'s population and is both more densely populated and was settled and developed much earlier than the West.

Then-Fox Sports sportscaster Joe Buck attributes the shift to the economics of running a business: "If you think there is a perceived East Coast bias, guess what? You're right. That's where people are watching, that's where the numbers are." ESPN ombudsman Le Anne Schreiber wrote that fans should forget about expecting equity in teams the network selects to broadcast. "It is long proven in NBA and NFL and MLB that spreading the wealth to 30 or 32 teams is a prescription for deflating ratings," said Len DeLuca, ESPN senior vice president for programming.

Where some major league sports awards are voted on by members of the media, such as NHL's Hart Trophy for the leagues most valuable player, the distribution of voters can tip the balance in favor of players who play in Eastern markets, especially with media voters who are not even familiar with players or sports teams outside of their own city.

== See also ==
- Criticism of ESPN
- Criticism of NASCAR
- Criticism of the Walt Disney Company
- Effects of time zones on North American broadcasting
- Fly Over States
- Laurentian Elite
