= Drive time =

Time when radio reaches the most listeners

Drive time is the daypart in which radio broadcasters can reach the most people who listen to car radios while driving, usually to and from work, or on public transportation. Drive-time periods are when the number of radio listeners in this class is at its peak and, thus, commercial radio can generate the most revenue from advertising. Drive time usually coincides with rush hour.

== Content ==
Mainstream stations employ high-status presenters for drive time shows. In the United States, popular national hosts who are associated with morning drive include Howard Stern, Ryan Seacrest and Steve Inskeep, while Sean Hannity is associated with afternoon drive on the East Coast.

Drive time often includes a heavier run of traffic reports, for which many stations employ their own helicopters or hire a third-party traffic reporting service.

For popular music-oriented stations, morning drive-time is typically dominated by the "morning zoo" genre of radio program, with the afternoon portion is often given over to music (often in commercial-free blocks, especially in markets with long commute times) and light entertainment features. For talk radio stations, drive time is characterized by regular news updates, as well as extremely frequent updates on traffic and weather forecasts to help commuters get to and from work. Primary news radio stations are almost always local during this time period.

== Variations ==
In the United Kingdom and Australia, the term drive time is used almost exclusively to refer to the peak evening period (most commonly 16:00–19:00); the term used for the period of peak morning listening is breakfast, akin to the phrase breakfast television used for morning TV shows. In circumstances where the phrase drive time may be ambiguous, the term home time may also be used for afternoon drive.

In the United States drive time consists of the morning hours when listeners wake up, get ready, and head to work or school, and the afternoon hours when they are heading home and before their evening meal. The exact times vary: morning drive times typically include 6–10 a.m.; afternoon drive times typically include 3–7 p.m. In the United States, these are the time slots as defined by Nielsen Audio for audience measurement.

With the rise of podcasting since the early 2000s, many morning shows also post their daily episodes online with now-superfluous news and traffic segments edited out, which are not restricted to drive time and can be listened to at a listener's leisure. This does come with the loss of interactivity outside of listener questions which are screened for the next show.

Drive time programming is almost exclusively restricted to during the work week. On weekends, because driving habits are much less uniform, lower profile programs typically air in the respective time slots, usually "best-of" compilations of moments from the station's morning show through the past week, other niche syndicated programming, or brokered programming. Sunday mornings usually feature faith and religious programming, including live broadcasts of local church services or public service programming.

=== Multiple time zones ===
Depending on the station, morning drive can start as early as 5 a.m. local time, although rarely any earlier. Because the contiguous United States, Canada, and Mexico span four to seven time zones, what constitutes drive time on one coast does not broadcast in drive time on the other, which can cause issues for nationally syndicated programs; this is not as much of an issue in morning drive, which usually incorporates a tape delay to air at the same time in all time zones, as it is for afternoon drive. However this effectively means that morning shows are heavily New York or East Coast–centric to allow time-shifting in all time zones, with some Central Time Zone shows making some additional headway. For all intents and purposes though, morning shows originating west of the Rockies must additionally plan to be mid-morning offerings for the rest of the country and adjust accordingly to be office-appropriate for those stations which take the shows in the east. National satellite networks typically air their morning drive programs from 6–11 a.m. Eastern Time, with heavy repetition. A similar situation exists in Russia, which spans nine time zones. This issue is mitigated somewhat in Canada and Mexico, where most drive time programs are local and are unaffected by these problems.

These issues are not present in the United Kingdom or New Zealand, where the entire country is in the same time zone. In Australia, there is a two-hour time zone difference between the eastern and western coasts; and three time zones; however, other than Greater Perth, most of the country's population is located in the southern and eastern portions of the country, and its time zones are only a half-hour apart.

== See also ==
- Prime time, a related concept in television
- Traffic message channel
