= Criticism of ESPN =

Throughout its history, ESPN and its sister networks have been the targets of criticism for programming choices, biased coverage, conflict of interest, and controversies with individual broadcasters and analysts. Additionally, ESPN has been criticized for focusing too much on the Dallas Cowboys, LeBron James, Los Angeles and New York teams in general (particularly the Los Angeles Lakers, Los Angeles Dodgers, and New York Yankees), Shohei Ohtani, Aaron Judge, Lionel Messi, the Southeastern Conference (SEC), basketball and American football and very little on other sports such as Major League Baseball (MLB), the National Hockey League (NHL), and Women's National Basketball Association (WNBA). Other criticism has focused on issues of race and ethnicity in ESPN's varying mediated forms, as well as carriage fees and issues regarding the exportation of ESPN content.

Some critics argue that ESPN's success is their ability to provide other enterprise and investigative sports news while competing with other hard sports-news-producing outlets such as Yahoo! Sports and Fox Sports. Some scholars have challenged ESPN's journalistic integrity calling for an expanded standard of professionalism to prevent biased coverage and conflicts of interest. Mike Freeman's 2001 book ESPN: The Uncensored History, which alleged sexual harassment, drug use and gambling, was the first critical study of ESPN. And then in 2011, a detailed oral history about ESPN by James Andrew Miller and Tom Shales called Those Guys Have All the Fun: Inside the World of ESPN was released.

== Cost and finances ==
ESPN has also been accused of overpaying for sports broadcasting rights, and that Wall Street analysts have raised concerns that this could be a major drain on Disney as a whole, since the amount of money that can be recuperated from retransmission consent fees and advertising is limited; Disney still profits from the ESPN division but as of 2015 was cutting the network's higher-priced content to ensure long-term profitability. In October 2015, ESPN laid off about 300 employees, citing the rights costs combined with the increasing trend of cord-cutting.

ESPN currently charges the highest retransmission consent fee of any major cable television network in the United States. In 2011, the main channel alone carried a monthly rate of $4.69 per subscriber (nearly five times the price of the next-costliest channel, TNT), with ESPN's other English language channels costing an additional $1.13 per subscriber; these prices rise on a nearly constant basis. By 2017, ESPN's fees had risen to over $7 for the main channel and roughly $3 for its sister outlets. As of 2024, the rate was $9.42 per subscriber, which was steady compared to the previous year and had risen more slowly than TNT and regional sports networks. Part of the cause of this high fee is the amount of money that ESPN pays for sports rights, particularly the NFL. In August 2011, ESPN agreed to pay the NFL $1.9 billion annually for the rights to carry Monday Night Football through 2021; this despite the fact that the broadcast networks pay approximately half that price for their packages, which include lucrative and highly watched contests such as the Super Bowl, conference championships and Thanksgiving games while ESPN's package does not (ESPN's package does include the NFL draft). Cable and satellite television providers condemned ESPN's most recent contract extension with the NFL and have contemplated moving the network to a higher programming tier to mitigate cost increases.

In 2012, ESPN reportedly paid about $7.3 billion over 12 years for the broadcasting rights to all seven bowl games of the College Football Playoff, an average of about $608 million per year. That includes $215 million per year which they previously agreed to air the Rose, Sugar and Orange bowls, plus $470–475 million annually for the rest of the package. Also in 2012, ESPN and Major League Baseball agreed to an eight-year extension, increasing ESPN's average yearly payment from about $360 million to approximately $700 million. In October 2014, ESPN signed a nine-year extension with the NBA, worth three times as much as the previous deal.

These deals were made when new sports channels like NBCSN and Fox Sports 1 emerged, and so analysts believe that ESPN deliberately drove the prices up as a defensive measure to block these competitors from acquiring live rights. Wall Street analysts have also raised concerns that the amount ESPN is paying for all of these rights could be a major drain on The Walt Disney Company as a whole, since the amount of money that can be recuperated from retransmission consent fees and advertising is limited; Disney still profits from the ESPN division but as of 2015 was cutting ESPN's higher-priced content to ensure long-term profitability. In October 2015, ESPN laid off about 300 employees, citing the rights costs combined with the increasing trend of cord-cutting. Another 100 employees, mostly in news gathering and including large numbers of public faces of the network, were laid off in April 2017.

John Skipper's time as President of ESPN was tumultuous. During Skipper's tenure (from January 2012 to December 2017) ESPN lost nearly 15% of its subscribers and laid off more than 500 employees. Additionally, ESPN's television ratings declined significantly across the board and ESPN endured criticism from some quarters over the declining quality of its programming.

== Bias towards certain teams and players ==
ESPN has been accused of having a bias towards certain sports teams and a "love affair" with superstar players and big market franchises, particularly teams and superstars that play in Los Angeles and New York City. ESPN's ombudsman, Le Anne Schreiber, responded to these criticisms by saying that the industry is ratings-driven. Since MLB Network launched on January 1, 2009, Baseball Tonight has been the target of criticism because of its perceived bias in favor of certain teams such as the Boston Red Sox, New York Mets, and the New York Yankees, both based within driving distance of ESPN's studios in Bristol, Connecticut. One opinion was expressed by former major-leaguer Heath Bell:

I truly believe ESPN only cares about promoting the Red Sox and Yankees and Mets – nobody else. That's why I like the MLB Network, because they promote everybody. I'm really turned off by ESPN and Baseball Tonight. When Jake Peavy threw 8⅓ innings on Saturday, they showed one pitch in the third inning and that was it. It's all about the Red Sox, Yankees and Mets.

Additionally, the network's daytime debate shows (especially First Take and Get Up) have been criticized for focusing too much on the NBA and NFL, choosing narratives and drama over actual sports analysis. Athletes over the years have called out ESPN (and to a lesser extent its rivals like Fox Sports) for putting too much pressure on them and setting up a negative image on them, to which it’s analysts have declined to accept accountability. By far, the league with the most negative impact with ESPN has to be the NBA. Many viewers and players have accused the network for causing the fanbase to become more toxic than ever, from discriminating players that haven’t won a championship, to bias for big market teams like the Los Angeles Lakers, New York Knicks and Boston Celtics.

ESPN's NFL coverage has been criticized for having too many topics regarding the Dallas Cowboys, particularly in seasons where the team struggles to win and fails to make the playoffs. The Cowboys’ owner Jerry Jones has been the target of ESPN’s criticisms, to the annoyance of viewers who complain about the network milking their topics regarding the Cowboys. In the early 2010s, the network’s flagship program First Take has been criticized for what is perceived by many as its excessive coverage of the career of Tim Tebow. During his tenure with the New York Jets, in which he did not start in a game, and threw just eight passes the entire season, Tebow was nonetheless often a leading topic on the show.

== Carriage disputes ==
=== Dish Network ===
On August 4, 2009, Dish Network sued ESPN for $1 million in a federal breach of contract lawsuit, alleging that the network violated the "Most Favored Nations" clause by not extending the same carriage terms that it provided to Comcast and DirecTV for ESPNU and ESPN Classic. On August 5, ESPN announced it would fight the lawsuit and stated in a press release that "we have repeatedly advised Dish that we are in full compliance with our agreement and have offered them a distribution opportunity with respect to ESPNU and ESPN Classic consistent with the rest of the industry. We will not renegotiate settled contracts and will vigorously defend this legal action, the apparent sole purpose of which is to get a better deal."

Dish Network moved ESPNU from its "America's Top 250" package to its "America's Top 120" package on September 30, 2009. However, the provider claimed that the change had nothing to do with the lawsuit. On June 22, 2010, ESPN majority owner The Walt Disney Company pulled the high definition feeds of ESPNews, Disney Channel, Disney XD and ABC Family from Dish Network's lineup, although the standard definition feeds of all four channels remained on the provider. In March 2014, Disney signed a comprehensive carriage deal with Dish Network for its networks (along with several new networks, such as Disney Junior, Longhorn Network, and SEC Network), including high definition feeds and TV Everywhere access for the networks and ABC owned-and-operated stations, and the ability to distribute their networks on a planned over-the-top internet television service. As a condition of the new deal, Dish Network agreed to disable the ability to use the automatic commercial skipping function on its Hopper DVR on ABC programming within 72 hours of its original airing. In December 2014, Dish Network reached a similar new carriage deal with CBS, restricting the use of AutoHop on CBS programming for seven days after its original airing.

Disney's channels went dark again on Dish and Sling TV on September 30, 2022. The blackout ended almost 48 hours later.

=== Verizon FiOS ===
In April 2015, ESPN Inc. sued Verizon for offering ESPN and ESPN2 as part of an optional sports theme package under its new "Custom TV" offering for its FiOS service, breaching a requirement for the two networks to be carried as part of the basic service.

=== YouTube TV ===
On December 17, 2021, YouTube TV stopped carrying all Disney-owned channels including ESPN due to a contract expiration. The channels were restored on the service the next day, after the companies reached a new agreement.

Another contract expiration dispute occurred on YouTubeTV beginning October 30, 2025. The Disney owned channels including ESPN were restored on November 15.

=== Charter Spectrum ===
ESPN and sister Disney networks went dark on Charter Spectrum on September 1, 2023, interrupting coverage of the college football season opener and the US Open. Charter claims it intends to offer cheaper, non-sports packages to customers, as a way to fight cordcutting and to prepare for ESPN's potential launch of a full-service over-the-top subscription. On September 11, 2023, all Disney networks returned to the lineup.

=== DirecTV ===
On September 1, 2024, The Walt Disney Company pulled its networks from DirecTV after the two sides failed to reach a distribution deal. The removal, which included ABC Owned Television Stations and ESPN, came hours before a USC-LSU college football game on ABC (KABC-TV in USC's home market of Los Angeles was among the stations taken off the satellite provider), and also affected ESPN's coverage of the US Open tennis tournament. On September 7, two days before ESPN's Monday Night Football was set to premiere for the season, DirecTV filed a complaint with the FCC, claiming Disney had violated the commission's good-faith mandates by predicating any licensing agreement on DirecTV’s waiving any legal claims on Disney’s “anti-competitive actions,” including its ongoing packaging and minimum penetration demands. On September 14, 2024, all Disney networks returned to the lineup, but by the time the networks returned, the US Open was already over.

== Integration of ABC Sports ==
In August 2006, ESPN announced that ABC Sports would be fully integrated into ESPN, using the channel's graphics and music for its sports presentations, in addition to handling production responsibilities for the ABC sports telecasts. The last live sporting event televised under the ABC Sports banner was the U.S. Championship Game of the Little League World Series on August 26, 2006 (ABC was slated to carry the Little League World Series Championship Game on August 27, but the game was postponed to August 28 due to rain, and subsequently aired on ESPN2). The changeover took effect the following weekend to coincide with the start of the college football season, with NBA, IndyCar Series and NASCAR coverage eventually following suit.

Despite the rebranding, George Bodenheimer's official title remained "President, ESPN Inc. and ABC Sports" until his retirement at the end of 2011, upon which the "ABC Sports" portion of the title was retired. In addition, ABC itself maintains the copyright over many of the ESPN-branded broadcasts, if they are not contractually assigned to the applicable league or organizer. ABC-affiliated stations owned by Hearst Television (such as WTAE-TV in Pittsburgh; WCVB-TV in Boston; WMUR-TV in Manchester, New Hampshire; WISN-TV in Milwaukee and KMBC-TV in Kansas City) have the right of first refusal over the local simulcasts of ESPN-televised Monday Night Football games involving teams within their home market, which are very rarely waived to other local stations in their market areas. Equally, other Hearst-owned stations affiliated with other networks (such as NBC affiliate WBAL-TV in Baltimore) have been able to air NFL games from ESPN for the same reason.

ESPN has been criticized for decreasing the number of sports broadcasts on ABC, especially during the summer months. One such example is NASCAR: from 2007 to 2009, with the exception of the 2008 Checker O'Reilly Auto Parts 500 when the race was moved to ESPN2 except for the West coast, ABC aired all of the Chase for the NASCAR Sprint Cup races, along with the penultimate race to the chase. From 2010 to 2014, ABC only broadcast three Sprint Cup races with only one Chase race (held in Charlotte, North Carolina) to the outrage of many NASCAR fans and sponsors. Several other events such as the Rose Bowl, the Citrus Bowl and The Open Championship, have also been moved from ABC to ESPN. This, however, is not entirely the fault of ESPN, as ABC in general has attracted a primarily female viewership in recent years, with sports largely attracting a male-dominated audience.

Under NFL broadcasting rules, game telecasts aired on cable must be simulcast on broadcast television in the local markets of the teams playing, though the game cannot be televised in the market of the home team if it does not sell out tickets 72 hours before the time of kickoff – games that are not sold out must be blacked out in the market of origin. Similar rules and rights were previously in place for ESPN-televised Major League Baseball playoff games.

== Coverage of individual sports ==
=== Arena Football League coverage ===
Some Arena Football League fans complained that ESPN's 2007 and 2008 game broadcast schedule "inequitably favors teams" such as the Philadelphia Soul, Chicago Rush and Colorado Crush, teams whose ownerships respectively include Jon Bon Jovi, Mike Ditka and John Elway. Fourteen of the seventeen ESPN games featured at least one of the three teams playing in the broadcasts. The Soul (whose part-owner and team president is former Arena Football League on ESPN analyst Ron Jaworski) appeared in seven of the 17 regular season games aired on ESPN platforms, more than any other team in the league. This criticism was also present when NBC opted to not let certain teams appear on their schedule. In 2008, the Chicago Rush had nine regular season games on ESPN and ABC, while the 2007 Arena Bowl Champion San Jose SaberCats appeared in just one – a Week 1 game against the Rush; and the New York Dragons appeared in one broadcast, a 10:30 pm game versus the Crush. Other criticism includes the scheduling of games on various days and times, as opposed to a weekly AFL gameday.

=== Association football/soccer coverage ===
==== 2006 FIFA World Cup ====
Dave O'Brien joined Marcelo Balboa on the lead broadcast team for the 2006 FIFA World Cup coverage on ESPN and ABC Sports, despite having no experience calling soccer matches before that year. Because The Walt Disney Company, owner of both television outlets, retained control over on-air talent, the appointment of O'Brien as the main play-by-play voice was made over the objections of Soccer United Marketing, which wanted JP Dellacamera to continue in that role. Disney stated that its broadcast strategy was intended, in voice and style, to target the vast majority of Americans who do not follow the sport regularly. However, Mispronunciation and incorrect addressing of names, misuse of soccer terminology, and lack of insight into tactics and history plagued the telecasts, resulting in heavy criticism from English-speaking soccer fans, many of whom ended up watching the games on Spanish-language channel Univision instead.

==== Major League Soccer coverage ====
ESPN has been accused of putting more emphasis on overall negativity and the more violent aspect of MLS games (such as two confrontations, two challenges, and a player nursing a bloody head in its first six shots) in "Greatest Highlights of the Month" segment for their intermission reports.

=== Major League Baseball coverage ===
==== Bonds on Bonds ====
In 2006, former San Francisco Giants outfielder Barry Bonds starred in Bonds on Bonds, a 10-part reality series that aired on ESPN. At the time, Bonds was mired in allegations of steroid use during his Major League Baseball career. ESPN was criticized for allowing Bonds such a one-sided public pulpit, as he was the most powerful name in American sports journalism. The show was seen by some as ESPN giving up any semblance of journalism in favor of becoming a public relations front for major sports teams and players. ESPN responded to the criticism by claiming that Bonds would not have creative control and that the episodes would be fair and balanced, and only document the day-to-day activities of Bonds as they occurred, not as Bonds wanted them to occur. ESPN and producer Tollin/Robbins Productions officially pulled the plug on the reality series, citing "creative control" issues with star Barry Bonds and his representatives.

==== Sunday Night Baseball ====
On May 14, 2023, ESPN was widely criticized for its decision to implement a split screen between its coverage of Game 6 of the Stanley Cup Playoff series between the Vegas Golden Knights and Edmonton Oilers and a Sunday Night Baseball telecast between the St. Louis Cardinals and Boston Red Sox, which was being played at the same time and was ultimately won by St. Louis by the score of 9-1.

==== Technical issues during postseason broadcasts ====
On October 1–2, 2024, ABC aired Games 1 and 2 of the American League Wild Card Series between the Detroit Tigers and Houston Astros. The games on ABC were produced by ESPN, and during the 4th inning of Game 1 from Houston, the graphics department displayed incorrect stats during the players' at-bats. During the top of the 8th inning of Game 2, ABC's broadcast was hit with further technical issues that this time, resulted in poor and out of sync audio quality.

==== Decreasing commitment to MLB coverage ====
On February 20, 2025, ESPN informed MLB that it had agreed to mutually opt out of its current contract after the conclusion of the 2025 season. In a memo to teams, commissioner Rob Manfred described ESPN as a "shrinking platform" and expressed disappointment towards ESPN's decreasing commitment to MLB coverage, and stated that the league had "at least two potential options" for ESPN's package that would be presented to teams within the next few weeks.

=== NASCAR coverage ===
==== Local station pre-emptions ====
NASCAR's coverage during its time on ESPN when races aired on ABC was affected by local pre-emptions, usually for breaking news and weather coverage in the vast majority of cases, but also due to conflicts in local programming schedules; many of these examples pre-dated the current solution of most television stations, where the NASCAR race is moved to a sister station or digital subchannel network.

The 2007 Subway 500 from Martinsville Speedway was not shown on ABC owned-and-operated station KABC-TV in Los Angeles (owned by ESPN co-parent The Walt Disney Company) on October 21 due to coverage of a series of wildfires that affected Southern California, specifically the Buckweed fire in Santa Clarita and the Canyon Fire in Malibu. The race was instead shown on its second digital subchannel (branded as "ABC7+"), then not available on satellite providers or on select cable providers in the area.

Several stations chose to pre-empt the pre-race show NASCAR Countdown to carry local newscasts. KABC-TV pre-empted the pre-race program before every Saturday night race, and as well as before the 2007 Ford 400, which was held on a Sunday afternoon, to air an episode of the Disney Channel series The Suite Life of Zack & Cody from the network's ABC Kids block to fulfill E/I programming requirements enforced by the Federal Communications Commission. ABC affiliates WPLG in Miami, Florida, and KSAT-TV in San Antonio, Texas, also pre-empted NASCAR Countdown at least once during the 2007 NASCAR season.

KTKA-TV in Topeka, Kansas, located about 55 miles (89 km) from Emporia, the hometown of NASCAR Cup driver (and 2007 Chase participant) Clint Bowyer and about 55 miles from the Kansas Speedway in Kansas City, broke away from ABC's coverage of the 2007 Bank of America 500 early on October 13 to air its nightly 10:00 pm newscast and did not resume its broadcast of the race. KSAT also aired a brief news update, which came during a red flag, but returned in time for the checkered flag.

The 2008 Sharpie MINI 300 was not seen on several ABC stations for various reasons, ranging from weather bulletins (such as those aired on WSB-TV in Atlanta and WSOC-TV in Charlotte) to stations airing coverage of the Big 12 men's basketball tournament at the time of the race (such as with KLKN in Lincoln, Nebraska; where the race moved to an ESPN2 alternate feed, which is normally used when syndication exclusivity rules force an ESPN blackout). In addition, ABC's New York City flagship station WABC-TV carried the race, but pre-empted NASCAR Countdown and the rain delay to cover a construction accident at a high-rise building in Manhattan.

One pre-emption instance involved the network's primetime programming, After a red flag during lap 284, the 2008 Checker O'Reilly Auto Parts 500 Presented by Pennzoil, viewers in the Eastern and Central Time Zones were forced to watch the finish of the race on Lap 284 on ESPN2 as ABC ended its broadcast of the race to air America's Funniest Home Videos at 7:30 pm Eastern Time, while the network continued the race to its conclusion (ending at 313 laps) in the Mountain and Pacific Time Zones.

=== NBA coverage ===
==== ABC's NBA coverage ====
Some complaints regarding ESPN have concerned the promotion of NBA telecasts. The 2003 NBA Finals received very little significant promotion on ABC or corporate partner ESPN; while subsequent Finals were promoted more often on both networks, NBA-related advertisements on ABC were still significantly fewer compared to promotions on NBC. NBA promos took up 3 minutes and 55 seconds of airtime on ABC during the week of May 23, 2004, according to the Sports Business Daily, comparable to 2 minutes and 45 seconds for the Indianapolis 500. Promotions for the Indianapolis 500 outnumbered promotions for the NBA Finals fourteen-to-nine from the timeframe between 9:00 and 11:00 pm Eastern Time during that week.

In May 2025, ABC drew heat for prioritizing airing the F1 Miami Grand Prix over Game 7 of the NBA playoff series between the Golden State Warriors and Houston Rockets. In fact, ABC nor ESPN did not air an NBA game what so ever on Sunday, May 4, 2025. NBA playoff action on that day was instead, handled by TNT.

==== Pistons–Pacers brawl coverage ====
ESPN's studio team was generally more criticized than praised. After the Pacers–Pistons brawl in November 2004, ESPN's studio team came under severe criticism, both by the media and by ESPN itself for their stance regarding the actions of Indiana Pacers player Ron Artest (who entered the stands to confront a fan, sparking the melee). John Saunders came down hard on Pistons fans, referring to them as "punks", while Greg Anthony and Tim Legler defended Artest. The day after the brawl, Steve Berthiaume said the event was a "full-scale riot", and Steve Levy led into a report on the brawl on SportsCenter by saying, "before you unconditionally blame the players, take a look and a listen." He concluded the report on the brawl by calling it "on an overall sorry night for the NBA, and especially fans of the Detroit Pistons," without any reference to the Pacers.

==== WNBA coverage ====
During the 2006 WNBA Finals, Detroit Shock head coach, and former ESPN NBA analyst, Bill Laimbeer became irritated by ESPN's coverage. He was quoted by the Detroit Free Press as saying:

I just hear from our family and friends back home that, 'Boy, ESPN is killing you guys,' ... 'And (Nancy) Lieberman and Doris Burke are just trashing you left and right.' Not only me, but also some of our players on our ballclub. ... We're telling ESPN today to basically stick it.

==== LeBron James' "Decision" ====
On July 8, 2010, basketball player LeBron James announced on a live, one-hour ESPN special titled The Decision that he would leave the Cleveland Cavaliers and join the Miami Heat, beginning with the 2010–11 season. In exchange for the exclusive rights to air the special, ESPN agreed to hand over its advertising and airtime to James. James arranged for the special to include an interview conducted by Jim Gray, who was paid by James' marketing company and had no affiliation with the network. ESPN's reporting leading up to the James special, its decision to air the program, and its decision to relinquish editorial independence were widely cited as gross violations of journalistic ethics.

=== NCAA basketball coverage ===
Temple University head coach John Chaney once said "You can't get Dick Vitale to say 15 words without Duke coming out of his mouth".

==== Auburn vs. Kentucky (March 1, 2025) ====
On March 1, 2025, ESPN suffered a malfunction with its broadcast truck during the Auburn Tigers/Kentucky Wildcats NCAA Division I men's basketball game televised on ABC with 12:26 left in the 2nd half. According to a statement by ESPN, a generator that was connected to the truck at Rupp Arena caught on fire, causing them to lose power and knock the game off the air. The game was then moved to ESPNews due to the Pittsburgh Penguins/Boston Bruins National Hockey League game that was also scheduled for broadcast on ABC (Had the technical issues not occurred, the first few minutes of the Penguins/Bruins game would have likely aired on ESPNews and would be moved to ABC once the Auburn/Kentucky game concluded). Many fans and viewers were angry and took to social media to express their displeasure with ESPN over the way they handled the technical problem.

=== NCAA football coverage ===
ESPN was accused of being too negative in regards to its coverage of the 2024–25 College Football Playoff. ESPN in general was accused of spending the entire first weekend of the playoffs on December 20–21 bashing the participating schools, criticizing fans, and overall making the broadcasts a miserable experience for viewers.

On January 20, 2025, ESPN received complaints after President Donald Trump unexpectedly appeared to deliver a brief speech during halftime of the College Football Playoff National Championship, mere hours after his second inauguration. ESPN soon released a statement justifying its decision, arguing that it is a common practice that occurs during major sporting events.

==== Sports Emmy scandal ====
On January 11, 2024, The Athletic—the sports journalism department of The New York Times—became the first news source to report on a scandal concerning ESPN fabricating information in order to win Emmy awards that they would have otherwise been ineligible for. Per Katie Strang of The Athletic, in 2022, NATAS revamped their process for verifying the credit lists for shows nominated for Sports Emmy Awards. The academy subsequently reached out to ESPN to verify certain names that had been listed in the credits of shows aired by the network. ESPN informed the academy that some names were fake, and both organizations proceeded to launch investigations into the matter.

The scandal primarily concerned College GameDay, a popular program on ESPN that had won eight awards for Outstanding Studio Show, Weekly from 2008 to 2018. According to Strang, during that time period, fake names were included in the credit list for the show under the title of "associate producers". These names were similar to and bore the same initials as the names of several of the show's on-air personalities, who were ineligible for receiving an award won by the show by the academy's "double-dipping" rules. For example, the show's credit list for several seasons had "Lee Clark", "Chris Fulton", "Kirk Henry", and "Tim Richard" listed as executive producers, while the show's on-air personalities included Lee Corso, Chris Fowler, Kirk Herbstreit, and Tom Rinaldi. According to Strang, awards won by these fictitious people were received by ESPN, who would then have the statuettes re-engraved with the names of the actual people, who would then receive the awards.

In a statement released on January 12, 2024, ESPN said, "Some members of our team were clearly wrong in submitting certain names" and that "This was a misguided attempt to recognize on-air individuals who were important members of our production team". ESPN also stated that they had worked with NATAS to overhaul their submissions process to avoid something similar from happening in the future. NATAS stated that, after alerting ESPN to the scandal, "the network took steps to take responsibility for the actions of its personnel, to investigate thoroughly, and to course correct". Multiple individuals who had to return their Emmy statuettes expressed disappointment in the situation. Smith said that the actions of the producers in fraudulently gaining the statuettes for her and her colleagues had been "really crummy". Speaking a few days after the story became public, Desmond Howard—a College GameDay host who also received fraudulent statuettes—expressed frustration over the fact that Corso had to return his statuettes, saying, "They're taking that old man's Emmy's? If they're going to take his, you can have all of mine. I'll break these damn things. ... I said 'How could y'all even let this happen to him?' I was fucked up over that. I'll break all of them. Take 'em in pieces. That's how much they mean to me."

==== Protect College Sports Act 2026 ====
On the September 16, 2026 episode of PFT Live, co-host Chris Simms accused ESPN of pushing political messaging a means of protecting its lucrative broadcasting contracts for the Southeastern Conference (SEC). This came after ESPN invited U.S. Senator Ted Cruz (R-Texas) on the September 12, 2026 episode of College GameDay to talk about the Protect College Sports Act, for which he co-authored. An investigation by Awful Announcing's Jon Loesche uncovered that ESPN Chairman Jimmy Pitaro used his influence with Randy Levine, vice chair of Donald Trump's college sports committee, to have language inserted into the bill to protect ESPN's existing contracts.

=== NFL coverage ===
==== Ben Roethlisberger sexual assault case ====
On July 18, 2009, Pittsburgh Steelers quarterback Ben Roethlisberger was accused of sexual assault in a civil lawsuit filed by Andrea McNulty. ESPN came under fire for being the only major media outlet that refused to report on the story. ESPN officials attempted to justify their actions by stating that the case is a private matter. Furthermore, ESPN claimed that since Roethlisberger had not addressed the issue publicly, and since no criminal charges had been filed, there was no reason to report on it. However, many have been quick to point out other instances where ESPN has reported on civil cases as well as statements addressing the matter by Roethlisberger's attorney. The network's actions resulted in some media sources accusing them of double standards and poor journalistic practices. ESPN began reporting on the story on July 23, 2009; one month later on August 18, ESPN released a column on its website explaining the network's decision.

==== Fantasy football and advertising influence ====
In 2015, ESPN received criticism from Deadspin for accepting advertising from DraftKings, a daily fantasy sports site, and integrating DraftKings into the network's football coverage through product placement, breaching the ethical wall between journalism and sponsorship.

==== Conflicts of Interests with NFL: Deflategate, concussions, legal issues ====
In 2011, ESPN agreed to a deal with the NFL worth more than $15 billion. This fact led several media organizations, including Forbes, to argue whether the financial relationship with the league creates a conflict of interest when ESPN covers the NFL. The network has also been accused of alleged pro-NFL bias on labor issues with the league and the union and ignoring or downplaying crimes or scandals committed by owners.

Also, The New York Times reported that ESPN spiked its partnership with the PBS series Frontline on the 2013 documentary "League of Denial", which chronicles the history of head injuries in the NFL, shortly after a meeting between ESPN executives and league commissioner Roger Goodell took place in New York City, though ESPN denies pressure from the NFL led to its backing out of the project, claiming a lack of editorial control instead.

Boston-based journalist Michael Corcoran stated that in the first seven months after the Deflategate scandal became national news, ESPN.com used the term "Deflategate" in 844 separate articles or videos, including Chris Mortensen's erroneous report about 11 of the 12 footballs used in the 2014 AFC Championship Game were 2 pounds per square inch (PSI) under NFL regulation. This was compared to when Jimmy Haslam, owner of the Cleveland Browns, was accused by the FBI in a 120-page affidavit of a five-year-long "conspiracy to scheme" and "defraud its customers" out of millions in rebates for his company Pilot Flying J. In the first seven months after the FBI raided Haslam's company, ESPN only mentioned the scandal 23 times, less than 3 percent of the coverage of the allegations of football deflation. "ESPN should, at a minimum, disclose the details of its enormous vested interest before reporting any serious story about the league," Corcoran's article concluded.

Nonetheless, in July 2015, The Hollywood Reporter reported that sources within ESPN believed that the NFL gave them a "terrible" 2015 Monday Night Football schedule as "payback" for remarks made on air by both ESPN commentators Keith Olbermann and Bill Simmons that were critical of the league and Goodell; ESPN parted ways with both Olbermann and Simmons during that same year.

==== 2020 NFL Draft coverage ====
ESPN immediately came under fire for their coverage of the first two nights of the 2020 NFL draft for focusing too much on the family tragedies of players as they are drafted. Sports blog site Barstool Sports called it "tragedy porn", adding that ESPN not only kept focusing on the death of players' family members, but also questionable stories like a mom battling drug addiction for 16 years.

==== Monday Night Football coverage ====
In 2006, ESPN took over the Monday Night Football package from its sister network ABC, who had broadcast the series for 36 years. 14 years later, in 2020, Aaron Barnhart of Primetimer wrote:

The NFL was never one to turn down a lunatic network waving a blank checkbook, so it agreed to let ESPN take Monday Night Football over to cable. Like a billionaire who locks his trophy wife up in their Hamptons home, ESPN immediately moved to minimize its prize. It started referring to the game as just "MNF", three letters, kind of like WTF. It pulled in announcers who would work for ESPN's modest salary. The results, over 15 years, are plain to see. Now it is Monday Night Football, with its second-rate football matchups and endless turnover in the booth, that embodies the "droning blandness of prime time", while Sunday Night Football is the biggest show on turf, and most weeks is the top-rated show on television. And NBC is not alone. CBS and Fox have outbid ESPN in recent years for game and league rights, since nothing like live events can bring a crowd to broadcast TV. Meanwhile, cable customers fed up with high monthly bills have been cord-cutting at record pace. All of this has upended Disney's apple cart. ESPN was able to justify paying sports leagues billions in contract deals because it made tens of billions in revenue on those games. ESPN has always been the priciest channel in your cable bundle, $9 per month per customer in 2017.

Awful Announcing's Ben Koo wrote on October 23, 2018, that Jason Witten was "in over his head" as an analyst. Koo added that "Witten made mistakes, was inconsistent, got tongue tied, and could be awkward at times". Meanwhile, the gimmick of placing Booger McFarland in on-field mobile platform is clunky because all involved had to have direct comments and questions to each other explicitly, and there were lulls in the broadcast at times when it's not clear which of McFarland or Witten should be jumping in. As for play-by-play man Joe Tessitore, Koo regarded him as an acquired taste and many were not acquiring it. This was due to Tessitore's style of "going HARD on a lot of calls, in energy and volume." Besides the commentators, Ben Koo complained about the distracting sponsorships from Old Spice and Genesis Motor.

On November 29, 2018, Deadspin's Drew Magary said that ESPN "Is too busy living in Monday Night Football's glorious past, trying to turn the franchise into an event with needless innovations and halftime concerts – like The Chainsmokers during last week's Rams-Chiefs game. All of those efforts to recapture MNF's magic failed, but that hasn't stopped ESPN from continuously trying to doctor up ways to make the game as much of an EVENT as it was back in the 1970s. This is a show imprisoned by its own history. They still have pictures of Howard Cosell adorning the MNF production trucks. They still use the theme. They dragged Hank Williams Jr. out of racist mothballs to sing his stupid fucking song from the '80s salad days. They still use ancient clips of Cosell slurring 'He could go all the way' and 'What a game this turned out to be' and all that nonsense. They refer to Monday records as if they are hallowed... None of that has stopped ESPN from still trying desperately to make Monday Night Football a thing. In the process, they've in fact cheapened the product."

Early on in the 2019 season, there were so many Twitter complaints over ESPN's then new down and distance marker that it was dropped after halftime. ESPN had made the down-and-distance graphic yellow, so it looked like there was a flag on every play. ESPN's Bill Hofheimer tweeted "Our ESPN production team is aware of the feedback on the #MNF down and distance graphic. We have called an audible and adjusted for the 2nd half of #HOUvsNO and for the #DENvsOAK game to follow."

When reviewing ESPN's production of the New England Patriots-New York Jets game from Week 7 of the 2019 season, The A.V. Club's John Teti wrote that "Once, Monday Night was the climax of an NFL week. Now it often feels like a last gasp. Monday Night isn't special anymore, but the production never formed a new identity to contend with that reality. So there's a lot of pretending. We all must pretend it matters when, say, a running back gains more yards in the third quarter of a Monday Night Football game than anyone has before. It's not clear why the Monday Night-ness of an achievement matters to anyone in 2019—though, did it ever? Regardless, part of the lore of Monday Night Football is that the lore of Monday Night Football is very important indeed."

Oliver Connolly, on November 26, 2019 in The Guardian, wrote "Monday Night Football: the once great NFL show was now the worst on television". The article cited the overblown announcing by Tessitore, incoherent analysis by McFarland and bizarre graphics. Connolly further wrote that "It often feels like the show's producers are more interested in their carefully choreographed packages and graphics than the actual game unfolding on the field. No other broadcast misses a play as consistently as Monday Night Football, continuing to prove that there is nothing in media or entertainment that cannot be ruined by more money and time."

=== UFC and MMA coverage ===
==== Lack of coverage and negative coverage ====
Despite the growth in popularity of mixed martial arts and its largest promotion – the Ultimate Fighting Championship – in particular, many fans of the sport felt that ESPN treated MMA as a fringe sport by either not showing highlights of recent drawing matchups or by portraying the sport in a negative light. Commentators such as Mike Wilbon and Tony Kornheiser of Pardon the Interruption, along with Skip Bayless, formerly of First Take have openly criticized the sport as inferior to boxing. Jim Rome of the former ESPN program Jim Rome is Burning however, often defends the sport and featured fighters as guests.

Some MMA fans feel that the influence of ESPN's corporate parent The Walt Disney Company (both due to not having broadcast rights and due to Disney's traditionally family friendly image), along with the influence of the boxing media have contributed to what they perceived as negative coverage of the sport on the channel. Other complaints included the ESPN show MMA Live being aired in a late Friday night (1:00 am Eastern Time) timeslot that many MMA fans feel is inadequate, and is often prone to preemptions due to live programming. After the UFC signed a television rights deal with rival Fox Sports, UFC president Dana White lashed out at ESPN following the cancellation of an appearance for an interview promoting the UFC 134 event.

In 2018, however, ESPN ultimately acquired the U.S. media rights to the UFC beginning in 2019, with a large focus on its subscription service ESPN+.

=== Coverage of professional wrestling as a legitimate sport ===
In its early days, ESPN aired various professional wrestling programs, including AWA Championship Wrestling from the American Wrestling Association as well as World Class Championship Wrestling / (United States Wrestling Association). ESPN started distancing itself from professional wrestling after the more athletic-oriented AWA went out of business in 1991, two years after World Wrestling Federation owner Vince McMahon admitted that professional wrestling was staged and was more about entertainment than about legitimate athletic competition. ESPN would not distance itself completely from professional wrestling, as the network commissioned the Global Wrestling Federation for three years following AWA's failure, and Canadian sister network TSN held the Canadian rights to WWE Raw from 1996 to 2006, as well as the parent network having aired This is SportsCenter ads featuring The Undertaker, Stone Cold Steve Austin, John Cena and Becky Lynch on occasion.

On March 24, 2015, former UFC Heavyweight Champion and then-current WWE World Heavyweight Champion Brock Lesnar appeared on SportsCenter for a "huge announcement" after it became public knowledge that Lesnar's WWE contract was set to expire after WrestleMania 31 and that he had been training for a return to MMA. However, Lesnar used the air time to announce that he in fact had re-signed with WWE and was retired from MMA, with part of the interview being done by then-SportsCenter anchor Jonathan Coachman, himself a then-former WWE announcer. This would be followed up by a segment on SportsCenter covering Lesnar's match with Roman Reigns at WrestleMania 31 for the WWE World Heavyweight Championship, featuring Lesnar, Reigns, and Lesnar's manager Paul Heyman in studio for the segment. (Seth Rollins ultimately won the WWE World Heavyweight Championship at the event after he cashed in his Money in the Bank contract mid-match.) Although ESPN was not criticized for covering WWE, it did receive criticism for covering WWE like a legitimate sport as opposed to entertainment; unlike other countries, the United States generally views professional wrestling as entertainment due to it being an open secret that professional wrestling is staged. Lesnar would subsequently return to MMA (while under contract with WWE) for a one-off match at UFC 200 while WWE and ESPN would gradually increase their collaboration into a regular segment on SportsCenter hosted by Coachman, as well as a subsection devoted to professional wrestling on ESPN.com.

The association between ESPN and WWE received criticism outside of mainstream media and within the two organizations themselves. Coachman (who himself would leave ESPN in 2017 and eventually return to WWE a few months afterwards) stated he had wanted a connection between ESPN and WWE for years following his departure from WWE in 2008, but had to wait "until the right person was in charge" before the two sides started forming a partnership. In 2016, the wife of WWE wrestler Kevin Owens would post on social media their eight-year-old son's reaction following Owens winning the WWE Universal Championship. While the post would receive positive responses from most reporters, Amin Elhassin for ESPN tweeted that it was feel-good moment for their son "until he finds out its scripted". Fellow wrestler Cody Rhodes, who had left WWE earlier that year, said that WWE needs to cut ties with ESPN and that having mainstream recognition "ain't always worth it" when one of their reporters tries to ruin it for a child. Rhodes did eventually return to WWE at WrestleMania 38 in April 2022.

In 2025, ESPN reached an agreement to stream WWE's pay-per-view events on ESPN's DTC streaming service. Beginning with the lead-up to its first event—Wrestlepalooza—in September 2025, ESPN began to aggressively promote WWE events during its regular programming, including featuring WWE personalities as guests on studio shows such as First Take, and plugs during event telecasts (such as a plug by Chris Fowler during a Monday Night Football broadcast where the commentator repeatedly mispronounced John Cena and Brock Lesner's last names).

When asked if developments in WWE storylines would be treated as news by ESPN programs, president of content Burke Magnus stated that "it’s unequivocally entertainment and entertainment is a part of sports, and it’s athletic and it’s what we do in every way other than the storylines are scripted and it’s presented that way and everybody knows that. But there's a full appreciation at ESPN of how compelling their content is from an entertainment perspective. So the answer is ‘yes’ for sure. But I’m not really prepared right now to tell you or give you examples of what that might look like."

Concerns were also raised over the editorial independence of ESPN.com's wrestling coverage from WWE following the deal; in August 2025, ESPN.com began to suppress landing pages for news articles relating to competing wrestling promotions such as All Elite Wrestling (AEW), leaving only ones for WWE. In March 2026, it was reported that ESPN.com had begun to exclude letter grade ratings from reviews of WWE shows at the request of company staff; ESPN combat sports writer Andreas Hale had given Wrestlepalooza a "C" grade in his review.

Criticism over ESPN's coverage of WWE intensified during the lead-up to WrestleMania 42; during the week of the event, Awful Announcing noted that WWE was the third-most discussed "sport" across Get Up, First Take, and The Pat McAfee Show, behind only the NFL and NBA. The abrupt addition of ESPN personality Pat McAfee into an angle for Cody Rhodes' match against Randy Orton (where McAfee turned heel and briefly formed an alliance with Orton) had also faced criticism from WWE viewers.

=== 2021 Nathan's Hot Dog Eating Contest ===
On July 4, 2021, ESPN experienced on and off technical difficulties during the last minutes of the 2021 Nathan's Hot Dog Eating Contest, where Joey Chestnut set a new world record by eating 76 hot dogs to win the event for the 14th time. The issues forced the network to take two in-competition commercial breaks. The feed cut off again during the finish of the competition, thus preventing viewers from seeing it. Many fans and viewers took to social media to express their anger towards ESPN over the technical issues.

=== Alternative outlets and third party accountability ===
Aside from ESPN's main competitors, such as Fox Sports, NBC Sports, CBS Sports, Turner Sports, and Yahoo! Sports, independent and regional sports-focused media firms and blogs, including Deadspin (now owned by G/O Media), The Big Lead, Bleacher Report (now owned by Turner Sports parent Warner Media), and 700 Level (now associated with NBC Sports parent Comcast), have served as alternatives for fans looking for balanced coverage or better local coverage.

Accountability attempts by third parties range from news articles, websites, and blogs either in a response to specific events or the ongoing lack of or over coverage by ESPN. Rolling Stone writers Jordan Burchette and Michael Weinreb each published articles examining the implications of ESPN's perceived SEC bias during the 2014 college football season. Moreover, independent blogging group Are You Cereal Box's main tactic is to track mentions of ESPN's alleged favorite teams and players via mentions on ESPN.com's front page.

== ESPN media outlets ==
=== ESPN MVP/Mobile ===
The book Those Guys Have All the Fun: Inside the World of ESPN notes that Apple CEO Steve Jobs reportedly told ESPN President George Bodenheimer in reference to the network's failed attempt at a mobile virtual network operator mobile phone service, Mobile ESPN, in 2006, that "your phone is the dumbest fucking idea I have ever heard".

=== Longhorn Network ===
Concerns were raised by some fans, bloggers and journalists that ESPN's financial stake in the Longhorn Network (which launched in August 2011) created a potential conflict of interest. Some fear that ESPN's involvement in the network will inhibit journalistic integrity as ESPN has a financial interest in the success of the athletic programs at the University of Texas. Sports Illustrated writer Richard Deitsch wrote: "The network's existence... creates an impossible situation for ESPN's college football producers and reporters (plenty of whom care about reporting). For every story ESPN does on Texas and its opponents, they'll be skeptics wondering what the motivation was for the story." It has also created issues where the various teams of the Iowa State Cyclones, a Big 12 team well outside the prime Longhorn Network footprint, has had to syndicate and create cable networks carried throughout Iowa (in this case, Mediacom carries a network known as "Cyclones.tv") to carry Longhorn Network-exclusive content involving the Longhorns as an opponent within Iowa under a secondary agreement with UT and ESPN.

Additionally, some questioned the stipulation included in the network's founding agreement that gives Texas the right to dismiss LHN announcers that do not "reflect the quality and reputation of UT." An ESPN spokesperson addressed the situation by stating: "This is not common in ESPN agreements because this UT network is so unique/new for us ...The provision does not allow for random replacement of commentators or reaction to critical comments... it's more about potential situations where a commentator makes completely inappropriate comments or gets involved in inappropriate actions."

LHN went dark on July 1, 2024 when Texas officially left the Big 12 for the Southeastern Conference. The SEC has had its own dedicated ESPN channel, SEC Network, since August 2014.

== ESPN original programs ==
=== First Take ===
Through the show's success, ESPN First Take has also experienced substantial controversy and faced increasing criticism. The show was criticized for what is perceived by many as its excessive coverage of the career of Tim Tebow. During his tenure with the New York Jets, in which he did not start in a game, and threw just eight passes the entire season, Tebow was nonetheless often a leading topic.

As forward LeBron James began a series of playoff appearances with the Cleveland Cavaliers, host Skip Bayless became well known for his belief that James had been overrated by the media and not received enough criticism for his team's playoff failures. Bayless has himself been criticized by fans as well as members of the media for exaggerating James' failures and diminishing his successes. In an exchange with Dallas Mavericks owner Mark Cuban, Cuban argued that Bayless had reduced his analysis of the 2011 and 2012 NBA Finals series to subjective assessments of player psyche rather than relying on objective analysis based on the schematic principles used by the teams in each series.

The show has also received criticism for its treatment of issues of race. During a December 2012 discussion regarding Washington Redskins quarterback Robert Griffin III and his commenting that he did not wish to be perceived solely as a black quarterback, frequent guest Rob Parker asked whether Griffin III was a "brother" or a "cornball brother". When pressed by host Cari Champion on what he meant, he mentioned that Griffin III had a white fiancée and questioned whether he was a Republican. Parker, though, acknowledged that he did not have any information substantiating that claim. In response, Bayless asked whether Griffin III's braids did anything to assuage his concerns. To many, this exchange was part of a larger trend of the nature of the treatment of issues of race by the show.

== Sociopolitical issues ==
=== 2015 Arthur Ashe Courage Award controversy ===
In June 2015, ESPN's announcement of Caitlyn Jenner, formerly Bruce Jenner, as the recipient of that year's Arthur Ashe Courage Award, one of its annual ESPY Awards, led to significant criticism among online commenters and some members of the media, with Bob Costas calling the decision to give Jenner the award a "crass exploitation play". Most of the critics of the Jenner award considered Lauren Hill, who played college basketball despite suffering from a brain tumor that would claim her life only a few months later, a more worthy recipient. Others cited Noah Galloway, an Iraq War double amputee who competes in extreme sports and was also a finalist in the spring 2015 season of Dancing with the Stars, as a worthy candidate.

=== Robert Lee controversy ===
ESPN made the decision to remove Robert Lee from the broadcast team calling the University of Virginia home opener against College of William and Mary on September 2, 2017, because he shares the same name as Confederate General Robert E. Lee. Robert Lee, who is not related to the confederate general, is of Asian American heritage. The decision was made in the aftermath of the Unite the Right rally in Charlottesville, Virginia, which protested the removal of a statue of Robert E. Lee.

=== Jemele Hill tweets about President Trump ===
On September 11, 2017, SportsCenter anchor Jemele Hill made a series of tweets critical of President Donald Trump, including describing him as a "white supremacist". ESPN issued a statement saying Hill's comments "do not represent the position of ESPN. We have addressed this with Jemele and she recognizes her actions were inappropriate." Hill later clarified that she stood by her comments as representative of her personal beliefs. "My regret is that my comments and the public way I made them painted ESPN in an unfair light", she added. Some criticized Hill's comments, including White House press secretary Sarah Huckabee Sanders, who called them "a fireable offense by ESPN"; Trump criticized the network and demanded an apology. Others voiced support for Hill and criticized ESPN and the White House's responses, arguing that Hill's comments were accurate and that a White House official suggesting Hill be fired infringed on the First Amendment.

=== Coverage of the Hong Kong protests ===
On October 8, 2019, in the wake of Chinese boycotts of the NBA after Houston Rockets general manager Daryl Morey made a Twitter post in support of the 2019–20 Hong Kong protests, it was reported that ESPN's senior news director Chuck Salituro had issued an internal memo directing on-air personalities to not discuss political aspects of the controversy unrelated to their effects on sport, as per prior directives discouraging "pure politics". On October 10, ESPN faced criticism for displaying a map of China during a SportsCenter report that included Taiwan and the nine-dash line.

== Doug Adler lawsuit ==
Former tennis player and ESPN commentator Doug Adler was fired after making an allegedly racist comment about Venus Williams on-air. In January 2017, during the broadcast of an Australian Open match, Adler commented: "Venus is all over her. And you'll see Venus move in and put the guerrilla effect on, charging." After online shock jock Ben Rothenberg publicised the unfounded accusation on Twitter, ESPN also insisted that Adler did not use the word guerrilla – but rather, gorilla – to describe Williams, who is African-American. Adler apologized for the remark after being told by his superiors to apologize on air, but was fired by ESPN the next day. Adler, who suffered a stress-induced heart attack over the incident, filed a lawsuit against ESPN for wrongful termination in February 2017. By early 2019, the lawsuit had been settled out of court in Adler's favour, with Adler receiving monetary compensation.

== On-air promotion of Disney+ ==
In November 2019, ESPN's owner The Walt Disney Company launched Disney+, which came with a publicity push through both ABC and ESPN personalities, and the latter was pointed out as a blurring of lines between corporate publicity and journalistic integrity. For example, there was a Simpsons-themed SportsCenter "Top 10" to star NFL reporter Adam Schefter tweeting that Disney+ "will change lives". Writing in Slate, Laura Wagner said that the "tongue bath" for Disney+ "represents a new inflection point in ESPN's decline from journalistic institution to entertainment company". Wagner added "This clumsy marketing blitz is an embarrassing exercise that turns ostensible reporters into stooges. It's also a stark example of just how flimsy ESPN's editorial vision has become." Meanwhile, Kelly McBride of the nonprofit journalism organization the Poynter Institute in an interview with The Washington Post said "You're turning the journalist into a salesperson and asking them to upsell the product. That's not the relationship you want the journalist to have with the audience member. You want that relationship to be about trust in the journalist's expertise."

== Accusations of a racist culture behind the scenes ==
In July 2020, New York Times writer Kevin Draper spoke with more than two dozen current and former ESPN employees, who "described a company that projected a diverse outward face, but did not have enough Black executives, especially ones with real decision-making power. They said the company did not provide meaningful career paths for Black employees behind the camera and made decisions based on assumptions that its average viewer is an older White man, in spite of its audience trends."

== Accusations of political bias ==
Republican political leaders including Donald Trump and then-Fox News anchor Tucker Carlson have accused ESPN incorporating their political bias into sports news. A 2017 survey of 1,423 adults found that 30% of respondents believed that ESPN was politically biased. Of those respondents, 63% responded that they saw a liberal bias, while 30% saw a conservative bias.

== Gambling ventures ==
In August 2023, Penn Entertainment reached a ten-year, $2 billion agreement with ESPN Inc., under which Penn would rebrand Barstool Sportsbook as "ESPN Bet". To license the branding, Penn will pay $1.5 billion in cash, and give ESPN $500 million in shares. Concurrently, Penn announced that it would sell Barstool back to its founder Dave Portnoy.

In response to this transaction, SFGate columnist Drew Magary wrote that the alliance could ultimately leave ESPN in a greater state of market vulnerability. At worse, Magary argues that ESPN could run the risk of rendering itself as little more than a niche product that only serves gambling addicts.

In an October 2026 interview with Columbia Journalism Review, former ESPN producer Nicole Noren claimed that the network all but neutered and turned a blind eye to stories that were inherently critical of sports gambling.

== Delayed responses to breaking news stories ==
On February 14, 2024, ESPN garnered criticism for its perceived delayed response to a breaking news story regarding a mass shooting following a Super Bowl LVIII victory parade for the Kansas City Chiefs. ESPN first addressed the news on air at approximately 3:57 p.m. Eastern Time. For comparison, CNN began covering the shooting at 3:07 p.m. ET. Meanwhile, FS1 began simulcasting Fox News' coverage at approximately 3:26 p.m. ET, after previously providing live coverage of the victory parade.

On April 17, 2024, Toronto Raptors player Jontay Porter was banned by the National Basketball Association for violating the league's gambling policies. Despite the fact that ESPN reporter Adrian Wojnarowski first broke the news of Porter's lifetime ban on Twitter at approximately 12:16 p.m. ET, ESPN did not formally discuss the news on the air until almost two hours later. Within that time frame, ESPN was instead airing The Pat McAfee Show, which did not acknowledge the news of Porter's ban.

On the September 30, 2024 edition of SportsCenter at approximately 7:16 p.m. ET, ESPN baseball analyst Eduardo Pérez shared the breaking news to anchor Jay Harris that Major League Baseball's career leader in hits, Pete Rose had died. Shortly thereafter, Harris ended his conversation with Pérez with no further questions to ask about Rose. SportsCenter soon segued back to a discussion from co-anchor Hannah Storm about that night's forthcoming Monday Night Football game. It wasn't until approximately 7:34 p.m. ET that SportsCenter formally aired a segment on Rose's death. In-between that time, SportsCenter devoted about six minutes to discussing the upcoming Monday Night Football match-up before moving on to a segment on Naismith Memorial Basketball Hall of Famer Dikembe Mutombo, whose death had been announced earlier in the day.

== See also ==
- Criticism of the Walt Disney Company – pertaining to criticism and controversies regarding ESPN's majority owner
- East Coast bias
- Criticism of NASCAR
