= Criticism of NASCAR =

Negative depictions of NASCAR

NASCAR logo

The National Association for Stock Car Auto Racing (NASCAR) is the sanctioning body for the NASCAR Cup Series, the O'Reilly Auto Parts Series and the Craftsman Truck Series. NASCAR also administers a number of regional racing series, including the Whelen Modified Tour, and the NASCAR Advance Auto Parts Weekly Series, as well as international series in Canada, Mexico, and Europe.

Similar to other professional motor racing leagues and sanctioning bodies, NASCAR has been a target of criticism on a variety of issues. Some critics note the significant differences between present day NASCAR vehicles and true "stock cars". Another topic of debate has been NASCAR's move to larger markets; in 1997, NASCAR added the California and Texas Motor Speedway, respectively located in the metro areas of Los Angeles and Dallas. This caused NASCAR to move away from traditional tracks such as North Wilkesboro Speedway (which NASCAR brought back as the Cup All Star Race between 2023 and 2025. In 2026, North Wilkesboro will host a Cup points race for the first time since 1996) and Rockingham, which has led to some fans feeling that NASCAR abandoned its core market.

Others cite the dominance of the France family (and Brian France in particular) in NASCAR's business structure, policies, and decision making. Recently, the increased number of Cup drivers competing consistently in the Xfinity Series races has been frequently debated. NASCAR has been challenged on the types and frequency of caution flags, with some critics suggesting the outcome of races is being manipulated, and that the intention is not safety, as NASCAR claims, but closer racing.

Since its peak in 2005, NASCAR has seen a gradual decline, with its television viewership reaching record lows in 2018 and race day attendance suffering to record lows as well. Reasons cited for its decline include the aforementioned track changes, the introduction of the Car of Tomorrow which both drivers and fans alike criticized, the constant tinkering of the rules of its championship and the racing itself, the change in its race day experience, the perceived decline in the quality of its racing, NASCAR changing its image to appeal to a more mainstream audience while alienating its southern fanbase and the retirement of its past stars, such as Jeff Gordon, Dale Earnhardt Jr., Tony Stewart, Carl Edwards, Kevin Harvick, Jimmie Johnson, and others.

Another general area of criticism, not only of NASCAR, but other motorsports as well, includes questions about fuel consumption, emissions, engine noise levels, and pollution, and the former use of lead additives in the gasoline.

== Changes in stock car style ==
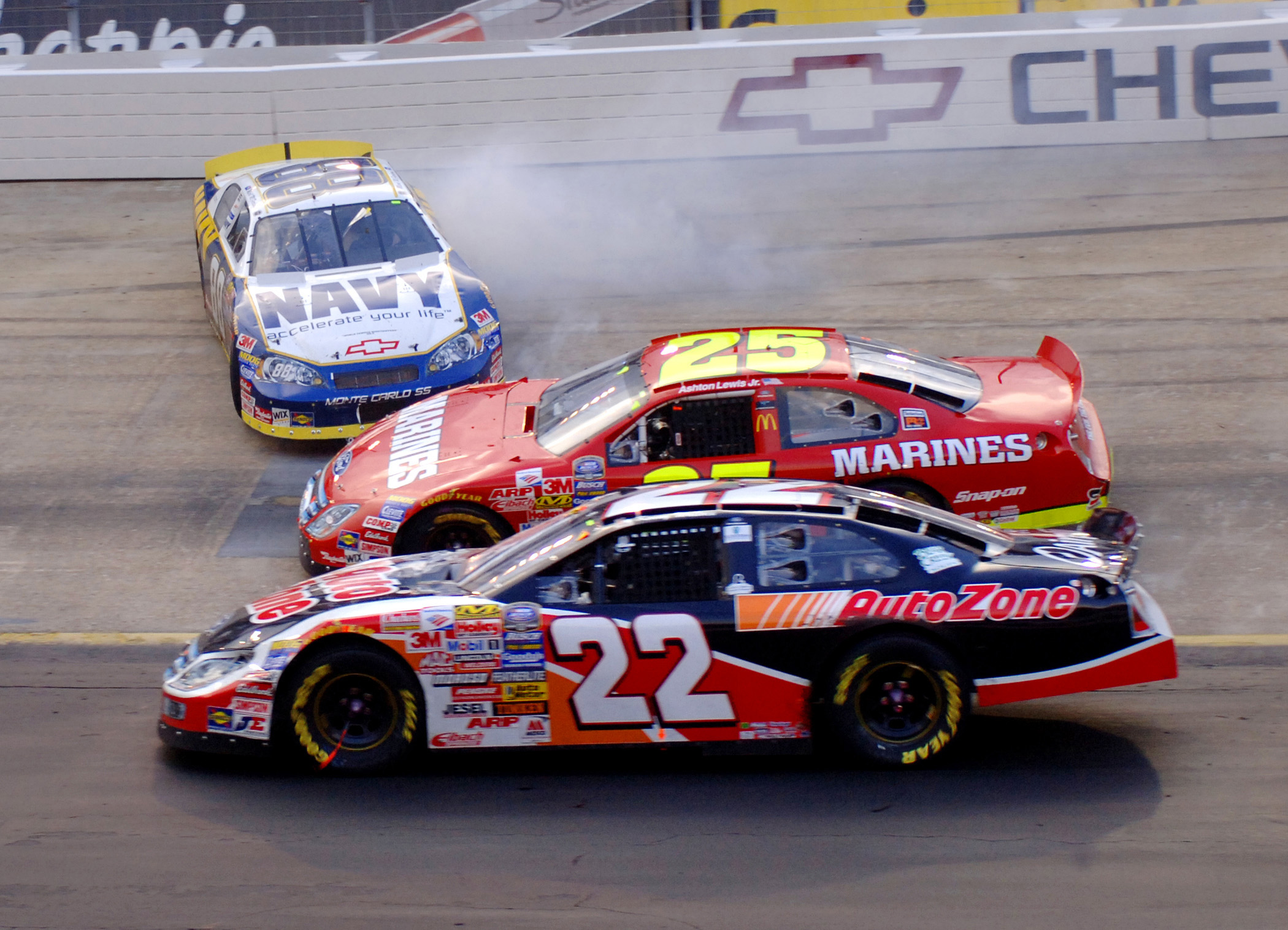
Mark McFarland (88) spins at Bristol Motor Speedway, while Kenny Wallace (22) and Ashton Lewis Jr. (25) pass to the inside during a Busch Series event in 2006, using Gen-4 cars.

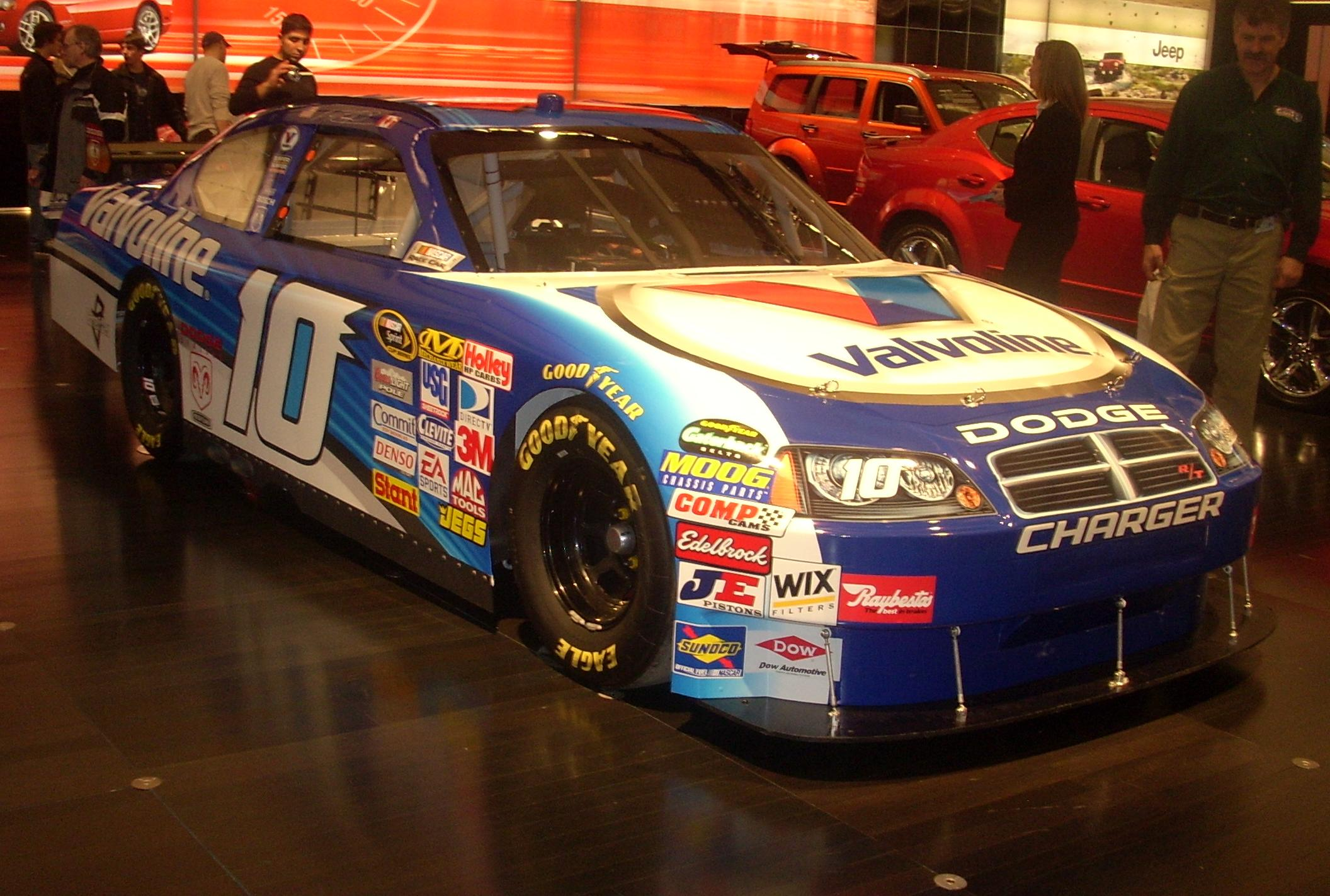
The Car of Tomorrow model on display in January 2008. Drivers and fans alike criticized the aesthetics of the car, and some have cited the Car of Tomorrow for contributing to the decline of NASCAR.

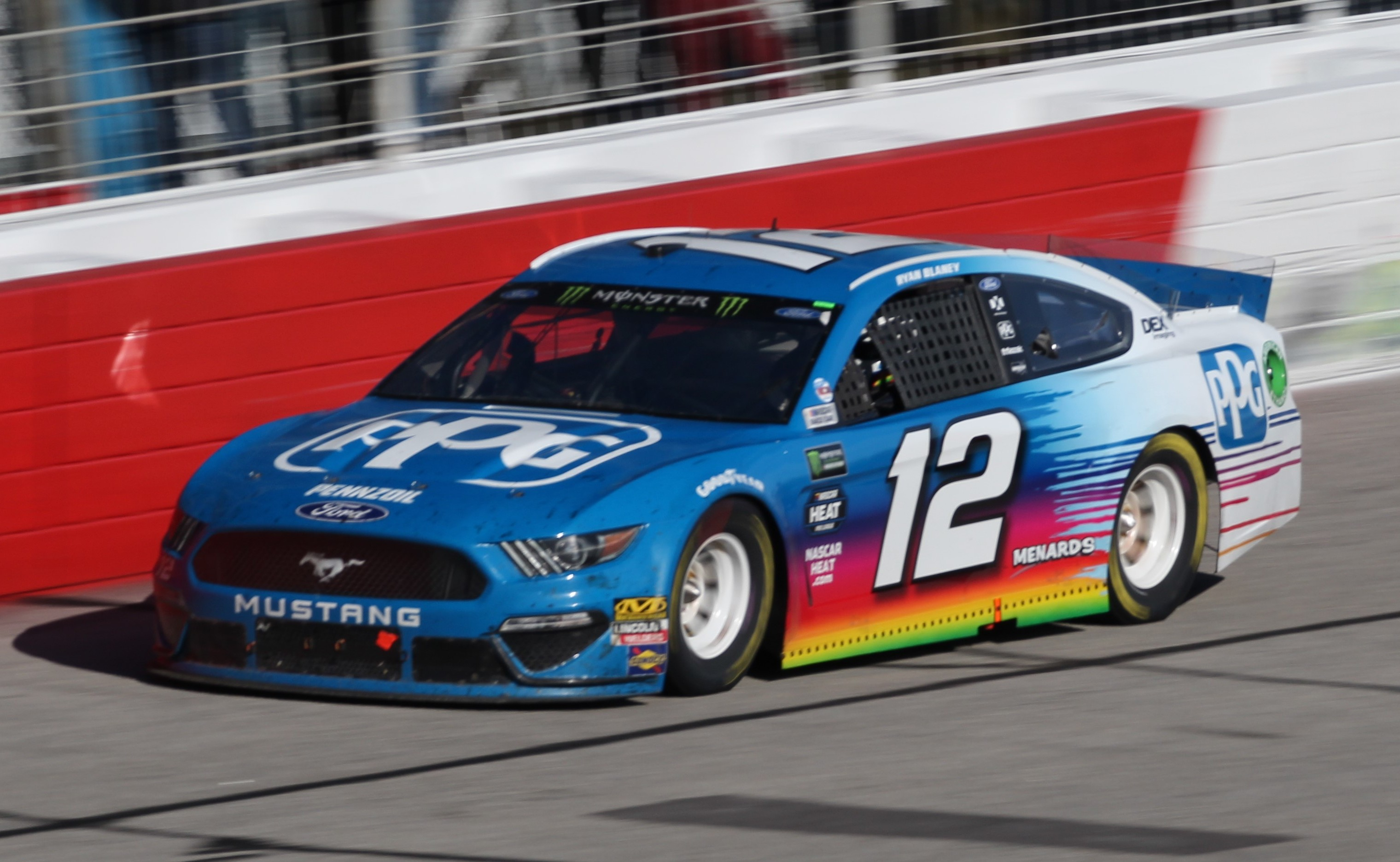
Ryan Blaney's Generation 6 Ford Mustang GT used in 2019. The switch to high downforce and reduced horsepower has been a point of criticism of the later years of the car.

Beginning in the early 2000s, NASCAR researched and worked on a new model to introduce towards the end of the decade. One particular area of scrutiny was driver safety; Dale Earnhardt fatally crashed at the 2001 Daytona 500, and the safety of the cars used at the time was questioned.

The Car of Tomorrow (CoT) was first tested in December 2005, and was first revealed to the public in 2006, with numerous safety improvements being touted. The CoT made its debut at the 2007 Food City 500, and was almost immediately criticized by both fans and drivers alike. Many fans disliked the large and boxy design, its more generic appearance and the use of a detached wing. Kyle Busch, who won the debut race of the CoT, proclaimed that the car "sucks" after his victory and expanded on this criticism at Dover in 2008 by noting how the CoT was "hitting a wall of air" in the wake of a leading car, thus neutralizing ability to close up on leaders. Busch was not the only driver to vent his frustrations; Jeff Gordon was also critical of the car, stating after the 2007 New England 300, "I'd like to know who it was who said this car would reduce the aero push because I could have told you from when I first drove this car that it would be worse."

Despite the criticism, NASCAR implemented the model full-time in 2008, and overall brought dramatic safety improvements and reduced costs of car maintenance. Despite the overall safety improvements, one point of contention was that the rear wing increased the severity of on-track accidents by causing cars to be more prone to flipping over or going airborne at higher speeds. After three such incidents between 2007 and 2010, NASCAR switched to a more traditional rear spoiler instead.

In a retrospective interview in 2015, Brian France believed that the introduction of the model as his biggest failure, due to the lack of manufacturer identity, as well as its perceived effects on its racing. Even after the implementation of the Generation 6 model, some fans still cite the CoT for causing the decline of NASCAR. Writer Christopher Smith of Car Throttle wrote that, "...NASCAR rules pretty much require all the race cars to be the same - no individuality aside from stickers that differentiate the models. NASCAR television ratings and fan interest has been decreasing for years, and as far as I'm concerned, this is the main reason."

The Generation 6 cars themselves, while somewhat better received than the CoT (Generation 5) cars were at the time, have received some blow-back. Denny Hamlin was most critical, saying, "I don't want to be the pessimist, but it did not race as good as our generation 5 or regular CoT cars did." Hamlin received a $25,000 fine for his comments, which he refused to pay (NASCAR instead took that amount from his race winnings). NASCAR later faced criticism over the Generation 6 cars over the change to high downforce and reduced horsepower in later years that increased passing difficulty.

=== Next Gen car ===
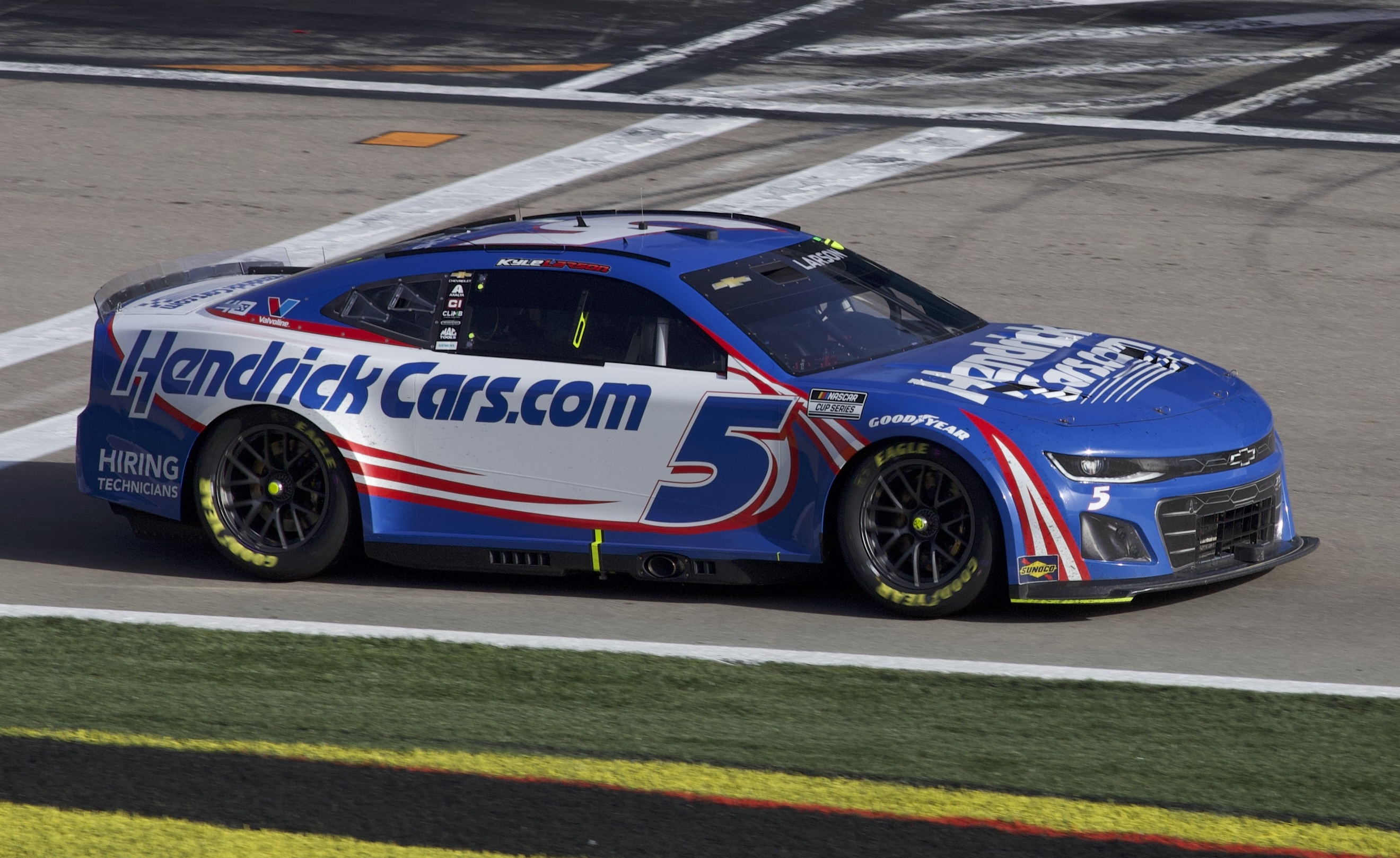
Kyle Larson racing the Next Gen car at Las Vegas in 2024

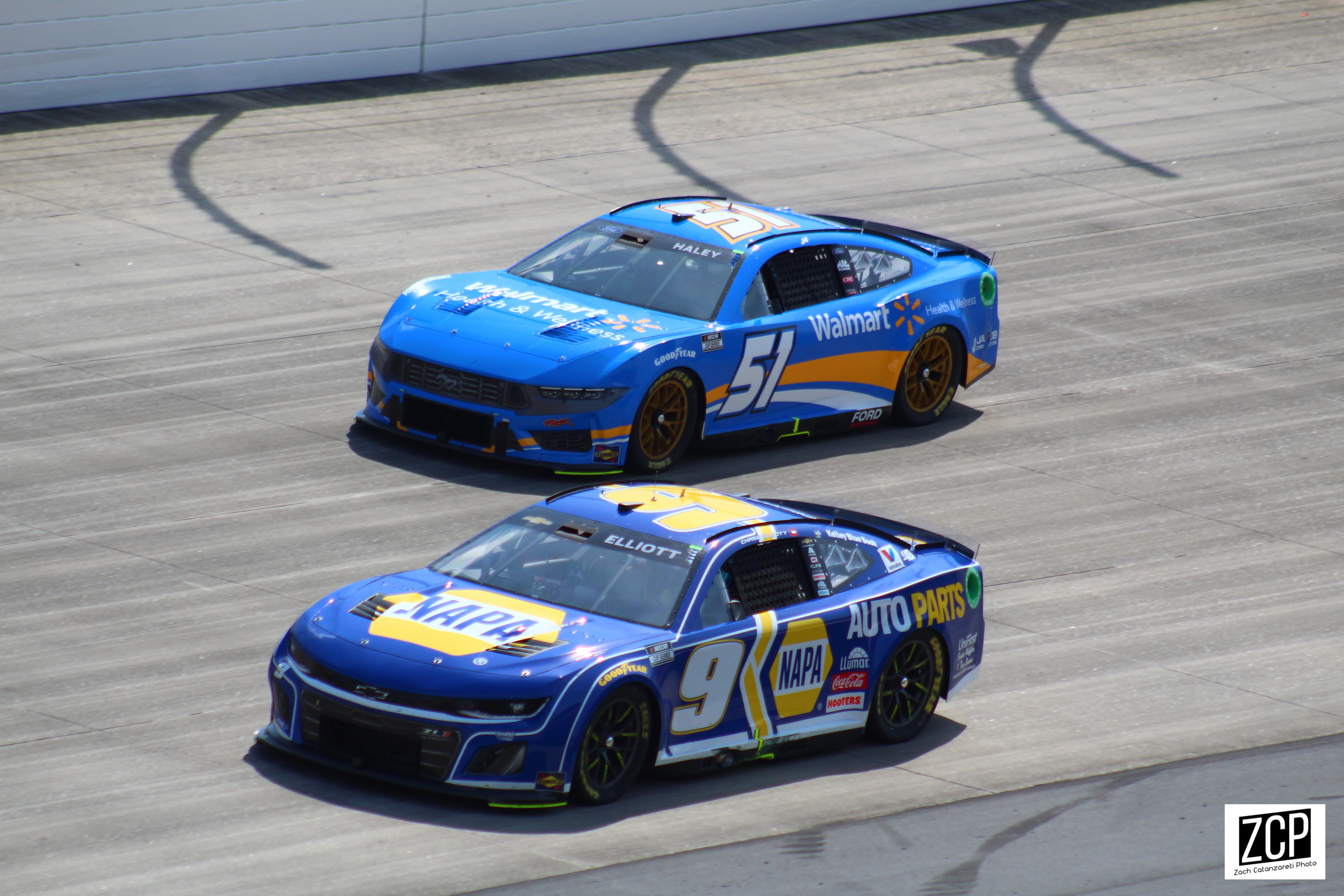
Chase Elliott racing Justin Haley at Dover in the Next Gen car (2024).

In 2021, NASCAR introduced the Next Gen car. It was promised to provide better racing, save teams money, and be safer than previous generation cars. It debuted in 2022. However, on track performance has largely fallen well short of expectations. Drivers and fans alike say the cars are too similar, which makes passing hard. Teams also say it is much harder to find small differences that make their car better.

Another problem with the Next Gen car was racing at short tracks like Martinsville, Bristol, and Richmond. Short track racing for years, aside from superspeedways had the best racing due to the compact track configuration. The Next Gen car has made passing short track extremely hard, meaning less passing and less wrecks.

Safety concerns have also been criticized. The first problem came in July 2022, when Kurt Busch was qualifying for a race at Pocono Raceway. He suffered a concussion after making minor contact with the outside wall. After this, Kurt Busch did not race again and decided to retire.

In late September 2022, Alex Bowman suffered a concussion on lap 98 at a race held at Texas Motor Speedway. He missed 5 races and was only able to return at the season ending race at Phoenix Raceway.

In the 2025 Daytona 500, Ryan Preece flipped his car. This marked the seventh flip for the Next Gen car since its debut. The Next Gen car had a marked increase in flips compared to previous gen cars due to its aerodynamics.

== Engine noise levels ==
In 2007, a New York Times article cited two studies conducted by the National Institute for Occupational Safety and Health (NIOSH), conducted during races at Bristol Motor Speedway in 2005, which found that engine noise levels can reach as high as 140 decibels, which can do severe damage to a person's sense of hearing. One NIOSH engineer stated that 43 cars during a race was "equivalent to a jet engine". The first study focused exclusively on Bristol Motor Speedway, while the second study took other NASCAR race tracks into account, and both studies found that noise levels regularly exceeded 140 decibels when the race cars were accelerating at full throttle, and that the noise levels lasted, on average, about three to four hours, the average duration of a NASCAR race. The article cites seven-time NASCAR Cup Series champion Richard Petty, as well as other drivers such as Jeff Burton, now requiring the use of hearing aids due to hearing loss caused by engine noise. According to the article, a NIOSH engineer suggested putting mufflers on the cars in order to reduce the noise, but a NASCAR spokesperson stated that they already tried that in the 1960s, and it did not work as intended.

Mufflers were re-tested with NASCAR's Next Gen car in 2023 and ran them at the Busch Clash that year. However, there remain challenges with the heat mufflers generated that are yet to be solved.

== Business structure and decision-making policies ==
Since its founding in 1947 by Bill France Sr., the overall NASCAR organization has been majority owned by the France family, ensuring that the family controls a majority of the revenue that the sport generates. NASCAR is also criticized for its reluctance to promote some aspects of safety that it would have to pay for (e.g., traveling safety crew), and other allegedly monopolistic aspects such as merchandising and race-track ownership.

In addition, due to its influence and lack of drivers' say, NASCAR has been described as a "benevolent dictatorship", with a top-heavy command structure that tends to keep dissenters in line. Examples of such influence included the cancellation of the Speed Channel television show Pit Bull (which frequently criticized many of NASCAR's decisions and policies and enjoyed modest ratings), frequent use of the vague "detrimental to NASCAR" rule, and the creation of rules on whim, especially during a race. NASCAR has taken to penalizing drivers in recent years, with fines, point penalties, and lap penalties in races for drivers or mechanics who use obscene language in interviews to the media.

The charter system, introduced in 2016 with the involvement of Race Team Alliance, has also been criticized as increasing entry barrier for new teams to enter the Cup Series while favoring larger, established teams with multiple cars and allowing smaller ones possessing charters to stagnate on-track. Following the announcement that Leavine Family Racing was shutting down at the end of the 2020 season, team owner Bob Leavine claimed that the team did not get the most out of the charter for what he paid for it.

== Driver competition in multiple series ==
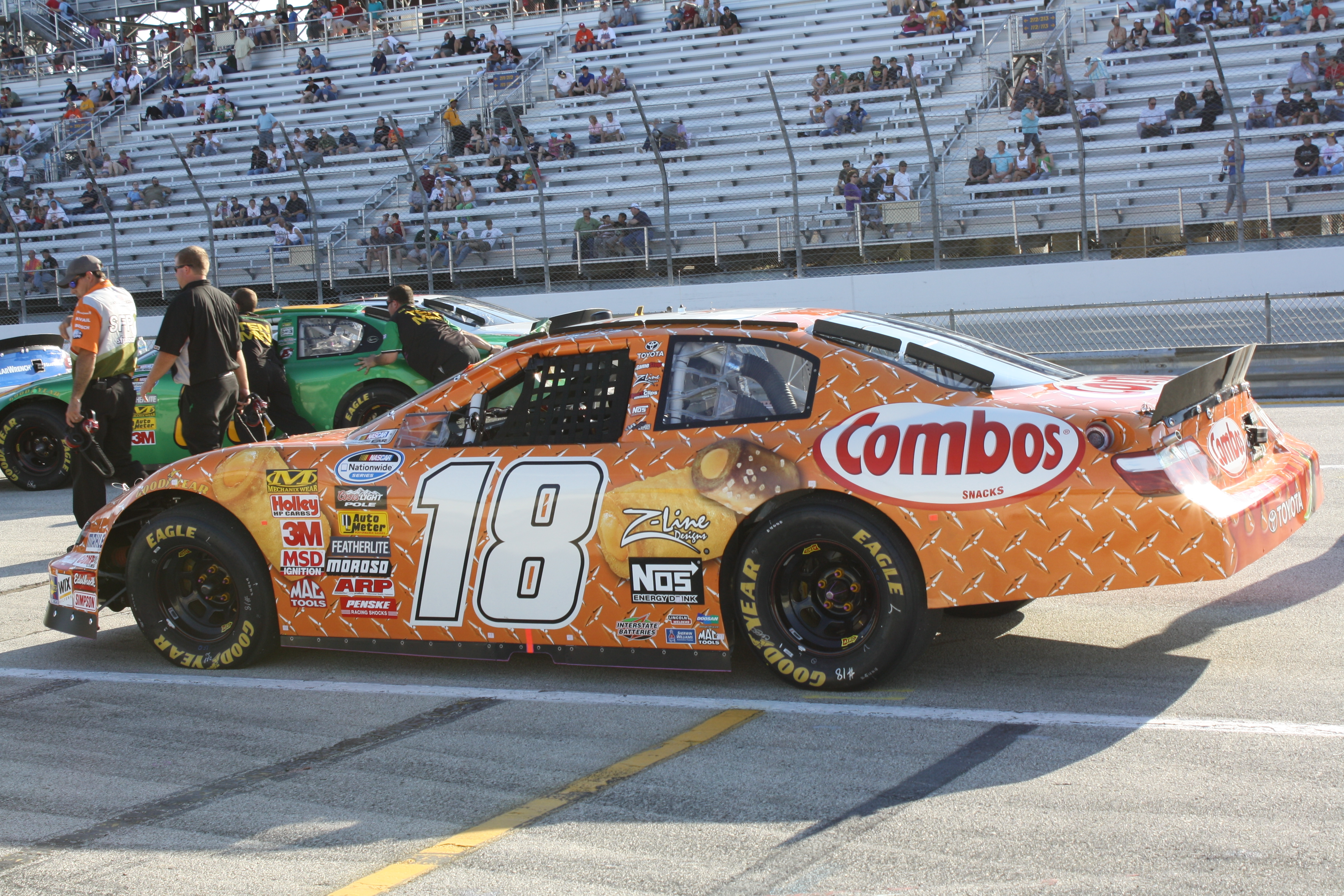
2009 Nationwide Series car of Cup Series regular Kyle Busch, who won the Nationwide Series championship that year

NASCAR has long allowed drivers to compete in as many series and events as they like, with few restrictions. However, in recent years, many Cup Series drivers have competed in and dominated the lower national series O'Reilly Auto Parts Series races on a regular basis, earning Cup drivers the nickname "Buschwhackers" (derived from the 1984–2007 sponsorship of NASCAR's second-highest series by Busch Beer). The situation is compounded by the close timing of the races in the two series: a typical NASCAR weekend has an Xfinity race on Saturday followed by a Cup race on Sunday at the same track. Some have wondered why "major league" Cup drivers are allowed to compete in the "minor league" races with such frequency, and whether Xfinity is an adequate developmental series. Sportswriter Bob Margolis noted that much of this is due to the similarities between the cars used in the two series (they are mostly alike except for the engines and the wheelbase), and the desire for Cup drivers to receive as much practice time as possible to learn about the track and car setup before the main race.

In the aforementioned 2008 meetings between NASCAR and Detroit automakers, the automakers also called for the Xfinity Series to become strictly a developmental series, with Cup drivers prohibited from running in the junior series. The request was rejected at that time. However, in late 2010, media reports began to indicate that NASCAR may institute a slightly modified version of this rule for 2011, with Cup drivers allowed to run in Xfinity races but not to compete for the series championship. In January 2011, NASCAR.com confirmed this, adding that drivers will now be allowed to compete for the championship in only one national series in a given season, a change that also affects the Truck Series.

In October 2016, NASCAR announced new participation guidelines for its three national series, limiting the number of Xfinity Series and Truck Series races that full-time drivers in its premier series will be allowed to compete in, starting in 2017.

== Environmental effects ==
=== Fuel consumption ===
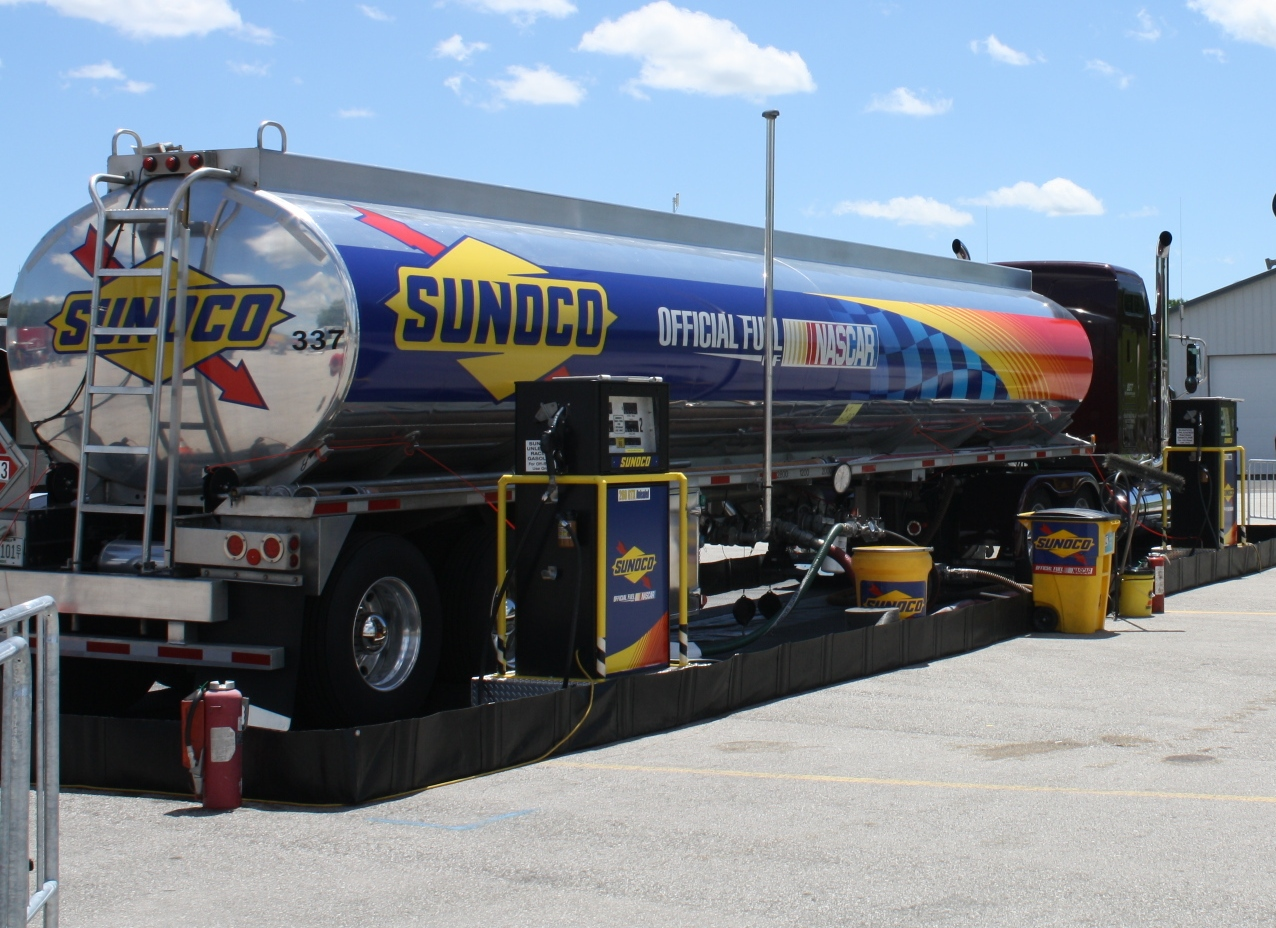
NASCAR fuel supply truck in 2010

According to NASCAR, about 6,000 U.S. gallons (~23,000 litres) of fuel are consumed during a typical Cup Series weekend. For the 2006 season, which included 36 points races, the total for the season would have been 216,000 U.S. gallons (818,000 litres). One environmental critic estimated NASCAR's total fuel consumption across all series at 2 million U.S. gallons (7,570 000 litres) of gas for one season.

At race speeds, Cup Series cars get 2 to 5 miles per gallon. Consumption under caution can be estimated at 14-18 mpg, based on comparable engines generally available to the public. The rate of fuel consumption tends to be the same regardless of the actual speeds of the cars, as teams change gear ratios for each race to ensure that the engine always operates in its optimum power band; however, the fuel mileage will vary for each race, depending on the maximum speeds attained.

The fuel consumption criticism dates to 1974 and the energy crisis; NASCAR responded by showing data that racing was far less consumptive of fuel than regular air travel and other non-motorsport sources of consumption.

=== Emissions and pollution ===
The consumption figures above provide no insight on environmental impact in terms of emissions. NASCAR vehicles are generally unregulated by the United States Environmental Protection Agency, and in particular, they have no mufflers, catalytic converters or other emissions control devices. However, some local short tracks which run under NASCAR sanction require certain emissions control devices. Many short tracks run mufflers in compliance with noise ordinances at some tracks; in the early years of the Camping World Truck Series, some races were held at venues which required mufflers, a requirement still used in NASCAR's K&N Pro Series (East and West) and Whelen (North and South) Modified Tours.

NASCAR continued to use lead additives in its race gasoline until the 2007 Auto Club 500 at California Speedway on February 25, which led to concerns about the health of those exposed to the fumes of the cars (fans and residents living near the race tracks). Lead is a well-known environmental risk, but the performance needs of race engines (in particular, the high compression ratios and sustained/repeated operation at high rpm and load) once made it difficult to switch to unleaded fuel.

In the United States, the commercial use of leaded fuel has been phased out since the early 1970s, when catalytic converters were required to be installed on new cars, making unleaded fuel a requirement (leaded fuel will destroy a catalytic converter). The sale of leaded fuel has been mostly banned in the US since 1996, but exemptions exist for auto racing, aircraft, farm and marine equipment.

NASCAR eventually took steps to eliminate the need for leaded fuels. In 1998, NASCAR and then-fuel supplier Tosco (Now ConocoPhillips, the company that produces the Union 76 brand of fuel) conducted an unsuccessful test of unleaded fuel in selected Busch Series races. In July 2006, in the first in a four-week test run of unleaded fuel, the first race since 1998 to run unleaded gasoline, known as Sunoco 260 GT Plus, a commercially available racing fuel, was held during a Busch race at the Gateway International Raceway in Madison, Illinois. The testing in July 2006 was successful with no suspected engine failures or malfunctions from the new fuel. In October 2006, NASCAR stated its intention to transition to unleaded fuel in all three top series (Craftsman, Busch and Cup) in 2007, starting with the Auto Club 500.

During the first race in which unleaded fuel was used, there were a number of engine failures during the race, leading many to believe that the unleaded fuel is to be blamed. The drivers who encountered failures include Dale Earnhardt Jr. and Martin Truex Jr. of Dale Earnhardt, Inc. and Kasey Kahne of Evernham Motorsports. The engine failures of both Earnhardt and Truex were attributed in part to the lack of a lead additive, but also to centrifugal force causing improper distribution of oil between the left and right sides of the engine. Evernham Motorsports has not disclosed the reason behind Kahne's engine failure.

The 2008 season marked the first season all 36 races used unleaded racing fuel.

2011 marked one of the largest "green initiatives" in the fifty plus year history of NASCAR when all fuel sources were to include Ethanol in a blend called E15. One unintended consequence of the conversion was higher horsepower and therefore slightly lower fuel economy. It is argued however, that the reduction in fuel economy and the resultant increase in fuel use may offset any environmental impact savings by reduced emissions. Although not connected to the fuel blend, a new "Dry Break" self-venting fuel supply can was also adopted in part for safety (reduced the number of people working on the racecar during a pit stop) but also in part to reduce the amount of fuel spilled during a pit stop, which has both environmental and safety implications.

In 2012 a complete technology change and shift in thinking occurred when NASCAR switched the NASCAR Cup Series to fuel injection from the current carburetor. Arguments have been made about increased efficiency; however, race teams will work to ensure they take advantage of the additional horsepower and efficiency to increase speeds so any improvement in efficiency may be lost to competition.

Today, the entire motorsports industry invests significant development costs in increasing fuel conception and moving towards net zero emissions in response to climate change.

== Participation of non-American manufacturers ==
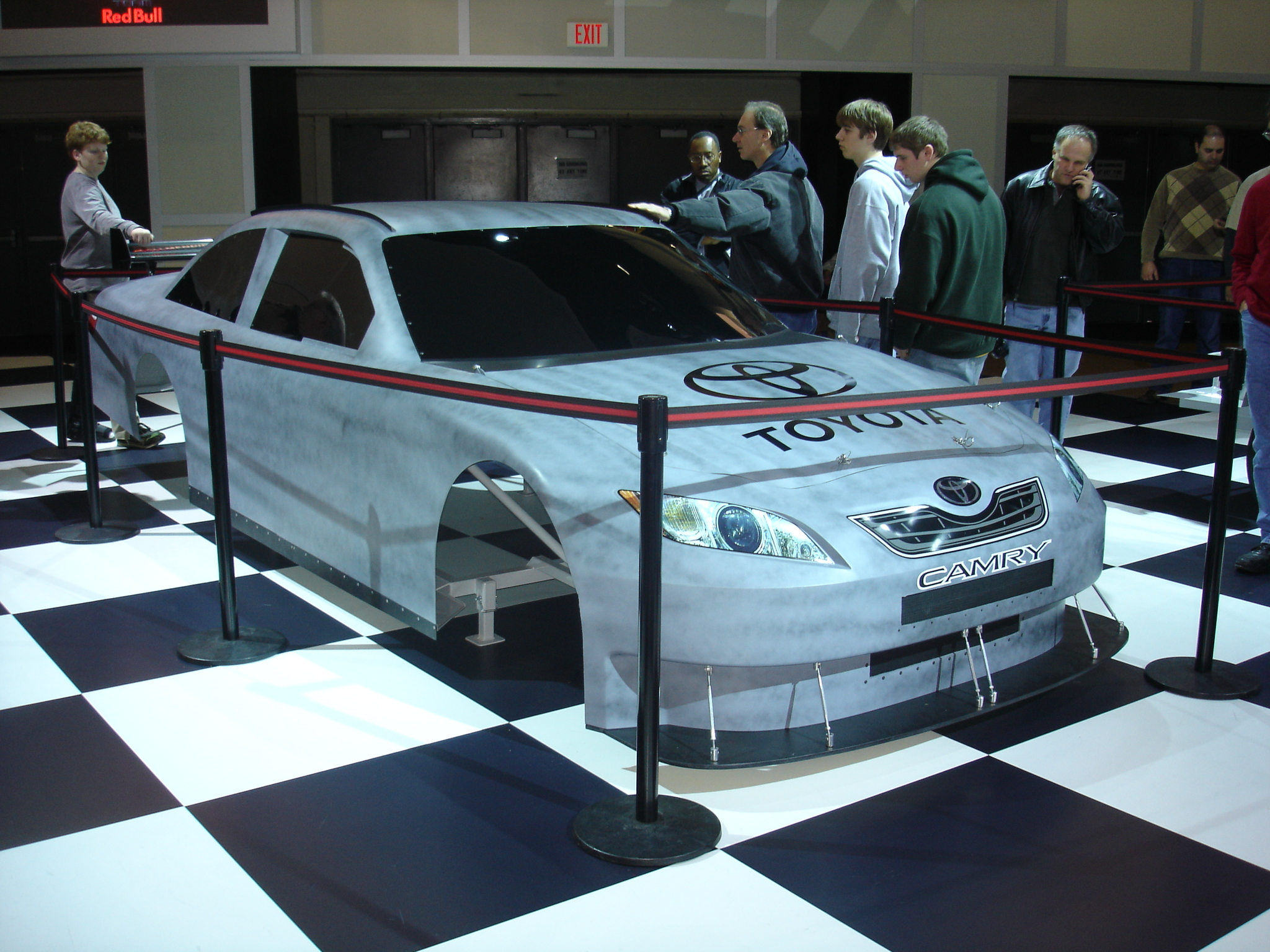
A Gen-5 car body with Toyota Camry decals

NASCAR's early history included several foreign manufacturers, such as Aston Martin, Austin-Healey, Citroën, Jaguar, MG, Morgan, Porsche, Renault, and Volkswagen. At a 1954 road race in Linden, New Jersey, Jaguar cars finished first, fourth, fifth and sixth.

As a matter of policy, NASCAR restricted entry to American car makers from the 1960s until 2004, when Toyota was allowed to enter the NASCAR Craftsman Truck Series with the Toyota Tundra. The restriction was relaxed in recognition of the fact that the Tundra, while Japanese in origin, is built in the United States. (Toyota had previously competed in Goody's Dash Series, winning the title in 2003 prior to their entry to Truck Series; various foreign makes have also competed in the series without direct factory support). Commentators have also noted that the "American" cars are often built or assembled in Canada and Mexico. As of the 2019 season and the introduction of the Generation 6 car, all of the cars in top three series (the Chevrolet Camaro and Silverado, Toyota Camry and Tundra, and Ford Mustang and F-150) are assembled in the United States, with major exception of the Toyota GR Supra (used in the Xfinity Series), which is built and assembled in Austria. (The Chevrolet SS, used from 2013 to 2017, was also a rebadged Holden Commodore (VF), a car of Australian origin and manufacture) Some fans have complained about the entry of a foreign manufacturer into what is perceived as an American sport, while drivers and owners have expressed concern that Toyota's deep pockets, and stated willingness to spend, may increase costs for other teams as well. Also, since NASCAR vehicles are only painted to look like production cars and are team-built, the "American-built" regulation can be considered obsolete.

NASCAR announced in 2006 the addition of Toyota to both the then-Busch Series and NASCAR Cup Series for the 2007 season. Toyota supported three Cup teams in a total of seven cars in 2007. As of the 2024 season, drivers who compete in the Toyota Camry include Joe Gibbs Racing drivers Ty Gibbs, Martin Truex Jr., Denny Hamlin, and Christopher Bell; 23XI Racing drivers Bubba Wallace and Tyler Reddick; and Legacy Motor Club drivers Erik Jones and John Hunter Nemechek.

Four Camrys qualified for and ran in the 2007 Daytona 500, becoming the first foreign make to compete in a Cup Series race since the British-made MG in 1962. However, Toyota's debut was marred by a cheating scandal involving owner/driver Michael Waltrip. Kyle Busch won the first Cup Series driver's championship for the brand in 2015 (despite missing eleven races due to an injury), with Toyota winning the first Cup manufacturer's championship the following year; Todd Bodine had been the first champion to have driven a foreign car of any kind in NASCAR's top three division in 2006, when Toyota also won that year's Truck Series manufacturer's championship.

Dodge, and its parent company Chrysler, were owned by Daimler-Benz, a German company, during the period in question when Toyota entered the fray, and is currently held by Stellantis, a European company. However, since 2013, Dodge has not competed in NASCAR (outside of the NASCAR Canada Series), but a possible return has been rumored.

== Criticism of tracks ==
=== Changes in traditional tracks ===
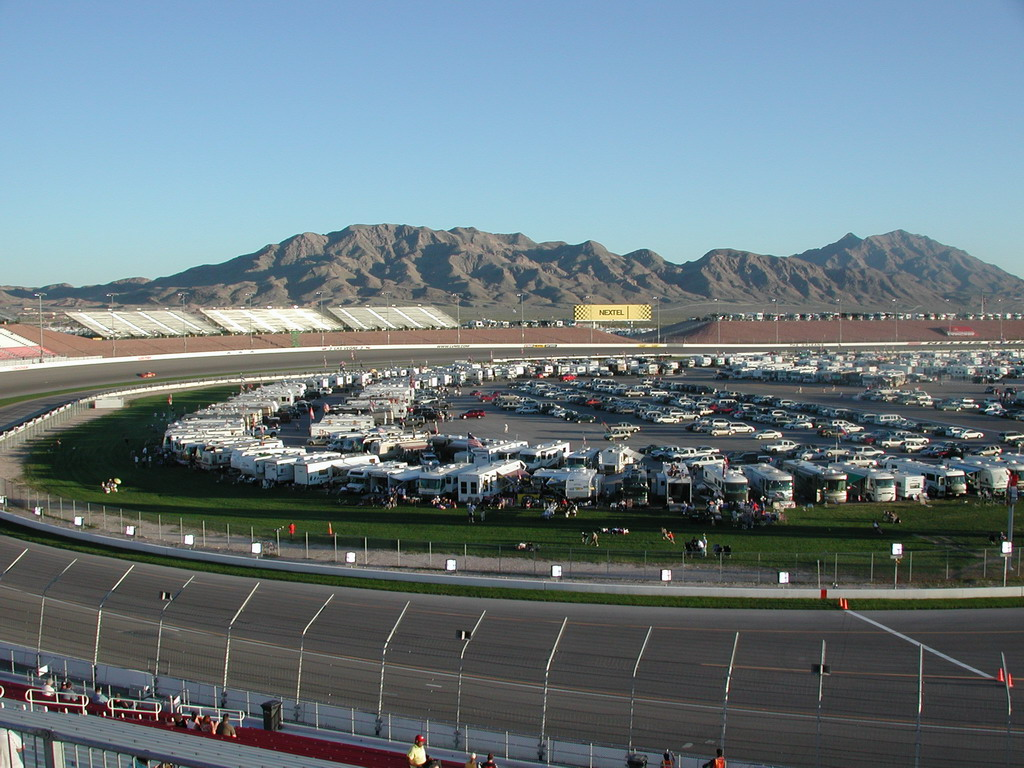
Las Vegas Motor Speedway

In 1965 90.9% of the NASCAR schedule was in the South Region of the US and it stayed above 70% until 1997. The Northeast Region started out with a high percentage of races in the early NASCAR years, but from the 1960s until the mid-1980s contained 10% or less of the schedule. The Midwest Region had 21.1% of the races in 1950, but many years before 1970 had no races. The NASCAR schedule had usually contained a few races in the West Region but never more than 10% until the late 1990s. From the late 1990s, and into the early 2000s, a number of new tracks were built and became part of the NASCAR schedule, in places such as South Florida, Chicagoland, the Dallas–Fort Worth Metroplex, the Northeast, and the Los Angeles area. This is part of a publicized trend to make NASCAR a more national sport rather than a regional sport. Today, the South makes up only 50% of the NASCAR schedule, while the Northeast has 19.4%, the Midwest has 16.7%, and the West has 13.9% of the schedule. A consequence of NASCAR maintaining its current 36-race schedule is that the inclusion of these new tracks in the schedule results in some of the more traditional tracks in the Southeast no longer hosting races. Examples include North Wilkesboro Speedway, which was no longer a part of the NASCAR schedule until 2023, and North Carolina Speedway, which held its last Cup race in 2004 after being in operation for nearly 40 years.

Traditionalist fans argue that this slow attrition away from tracks in those states where stock car racing began causes the sport to move away from its roots, and from uniquely styled tracks to those of a more "cookie-cutter" design. 36.1% (13 races) of the Races today are on what fans call "cookie-cutter" 1.5 mile and 2 mile tracks (which include Charlotte, Texas, Atlanta since its re-design in mid 1997, Las Vegas, Michigan, California, Kansas and Chicagoland), compared to the 12.9% (4 races) in 1996. Before NASCAR cut the number of races down for the 1972 season, tracks under 1 mile made up more than 55% of the races. After the changes for the 1972 season, tracks under 1 mile made up only 29% of the races in 1972 and then had 10 races, around 33% of the races, until the mid-1980s. After losing 2 races at Nashville in 1985 and 2 races at North Wilkesboro after 1996 the NASCAR schedule had only 17.6% of races under 1 mile. Tracks with a length between 0.5 and under 1 mile had the highest percentage of the schedule from NASCAR's first season in 1949 until the mid-1990s when tracks between 1.000 and 1.499 miles equaled them in percentage. Tracks between 1.000 and 1.499 miles had the most races in the late 1990s until 1.5–1.999-mile tracks passed them in the early to mid 2000s after the loss of races at Rockingham and Darlington. Today 1.5–1.999-mile tracks have over 30% of the races. The counterargument is that these "traditional" venues are in markets whose support for racing had long declined – Darlington failed to sell out races until it was cut to one date in 2005 while North Wilkesboro had no infrastructure and little ability to expand beyond 50,000 seats, and Rockingham failed to sell out its races for over five years.

The 2008 NASCAR–Detroit meetings also saw two automakers call for the addition of at least two new road races. One of these manufacturers also favored reducing the total number of races by at least four while at the same time increasing the number of road races from its current two to at least four. The most obvious way to achieve these goals would be to reduce the number of tracks that host two events a year. These demands were rejected.

=== Decline of road courses (1970s to present) ===
Since the seventies, NASCAR has increasingly focused its emphasis on oval courses. Such a plan was questioned as a key detriment to NASCAR, generating the stereotype of drivers and the sport as "a bunch of hillbillies driving in circles for three hours." Previously, some races were held on road courses, but by 1990 only two road courses were in use: Sonoma Raceway, and Watkins Glen International. This can be explained by the decrease in handling ability over the course of the vehicles' development. Also notable is the establishment of NASCAR layouts at Sonoma and Watkins Glen: the former omitted the Carousel section of the layout from 1998 to 2018 while the latter omits the Boot, again due to handling issues.

In the 2010s, NASCAR began refocusing on road courses, with the Xfinity Series competing at Road America beginning in 2010 and Mid-Ohio Sports Car Course in 2013 due to the loss of fellow road course Circuit Gilles Villeneuve. In 2013, the Truck Series began racing at Canadian Tire Motorsports Park, marking the first time in 13 years the Truck Series visited a road course. Due to the popularity of these races, NASCAR has been adding more road courses to the championship season schedule with races also taking place in rain. In 2021, the Cup Series schedule included seven road courses, with such tracks comprising approximately 19 percent of the calendar compared to eight percent in the past.

In the past few years, NASCAR has addressed the road course issue by adding a slew of different road courses to the Cup, Xfinty, and Craftsman Truck Series. These include Circuit of the Americas, Charlotte Roval, Road America, the Chicago Street Course, Indianapolis Road Course, and Autódromo Hermanos Rodríguez. However, now some drivers say there are too many road courses on the schedule. Denny Hamlin and Brad Keselowski have been very outspoken about having too many road courses.

== Manipulating the outcome of races and championships ==
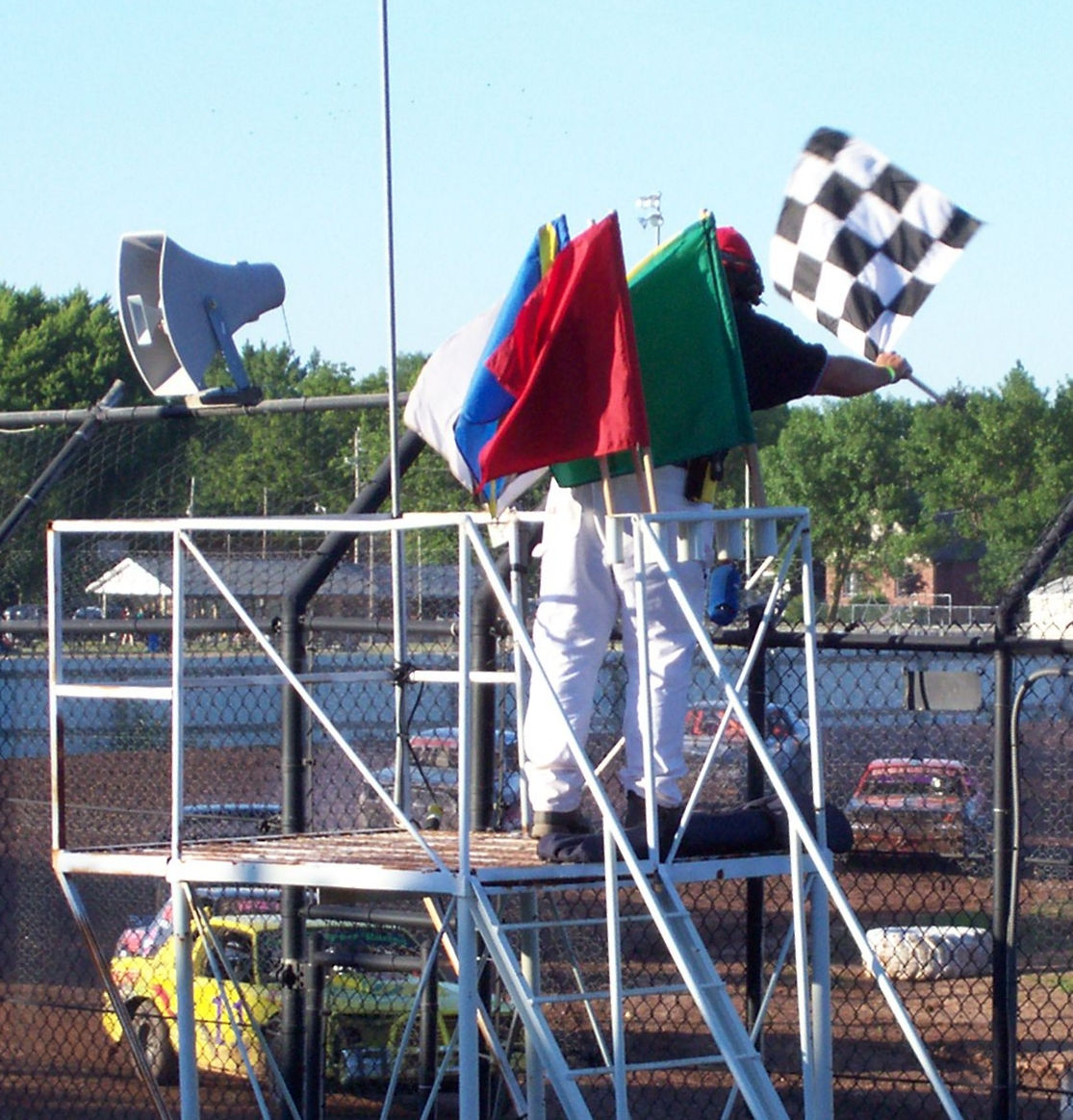
The flagman displaying the checkered flag with a complete set of stock car racing flags

NASCAR uses caution flags, triggered by race administrators, in which drivers are limited to certain maneuvers. The general purpose of this event is to reduce risk when track conditions deteriorate (for instance, if there is debris on the track, one or more cars crash and emergency vehicles and tow trucks need to be on track, or a car spins and is given the opportunity to catch up with the field). Generally, when a caution occurs, race cars must tightly pack before a restart.

The number of cautions per race in the NASCAR Cup Series increased from 7.4 in 2001 to 9.6 in 2007 (an increase of almost 30%), while the number of actual crashes per race has only increased from 5.6 to 6.7 (an increase of about 20%). This is likely due to increased caution periods for cleaning debris from the track. In 2015, the number of cautions per race averaged at 8.2, showing a gradual decline since then. Fans and competitors alike speculate whether some of these cautions are used to keep the cars tightly packed in an effort to keep a race close. An unnecessary caution at a specific time could affect a driver's strategy and the outcome of the race, while providing a potential opportunity for other drivers to close the gap and prevent a runaway victory.

In April 2007, then two-time champion Tony Stewart, on his radio show hosted via Sirius Satellite Radio, said: "It's like playing God. They can almost dictate the race instead of the drivers doing it… I don't know that they've run a fair race all year." Stewart also made a comparison to the WWE, which is scripted. NASCAR itself was not flattered by these comments, and stated that Stewart's comments were "very, very disappointing" but did not punish Tony Stewart, as there were no rules against criticizing the officiating of a race.

In an unrelated interview, driver Matt Kenseth said, "There's for sure entertainment cautions, there's no doubt about that, but we're in the entertainment business and you're going to get some of that and group the field every once in a while." Driver and commentator, Kyle Petty, said, "We're in the entertainment business, if they want to throw a caution every 40 laps to keep everybody bunched up, so the fans have a better experience, more cautions, the better."

In September 2013, NASCAR came under fire after the 2013 Federated Auto Parts 400 when it was suggested that the race was manipulated by Clint Bowyer (having already clinched a playoff berth), who was accused of intentionally spinning out in order to slow down the race which had seven laps to go. By this time, Ryan Newman was in the lead, and holding on to victory would have likely secured a playoff spot. However, a slow pit stop caused Newman to lose momentum, and Carl Edwards went on to win instead. This allowed for Bowyer's teammate Martin Truex Jr. to clinch a spot over Newman. Later that week, NASCAR made its decision to penalize Truex Jr. for the incident, which meant that Newman would take his place. In an odd decision, NASCAR also decided to expand the playoff field to 13 instead of the established 12, giving Jeff Gordon (one of NASCAR's most popular drivers) a spot, with NASCAR stating that Gordon has also been unfairly aggrieved by Bowyer and Truex Jr.'s actions. Simultaneously, Joey Logano was accused of receiving illicit help from Front Row Motorsports in order to secure a playoff spot, and both Penske Racing and Front Row Motorsports were placed on probation for the rest of the year as a result, but Logano was allowed to participate in the playoffs that year. NASCAR would be rocked by another race manipulation scandal six years later, involving backmarker teams during that year's season finale, the 2019 Ford EcoBoost 400, involving bonuses for the best team without a Race Team Alliance charter (a system introduced in 2016) in that year's owner point standings.

In the 2021 at O'Reilly Auto Parts 253, a caution flag flown for rain was accused of being an "entertainment" caution due to it being not being considered too wet to continue racing. The caution was also said to have altered the finish of the race preventing Chase Elliott (who criticized the caution over the radio) from walking away easily with a win.

== NASCAR Playoffs controversy ==
=== Format ===
In 2004, NASCAR made a huge change to how it crowned its champion. Instead of rewarding the driver who scored the most points throughout the season as a whole, NASCAR opted to start "The Chase for the Cup". NASCAR's hope was "a way to increase the excitement and opportunity for more drivers to win." The new format involved a 26 race "regular season" followed by the final 10 races of the season where the top 10 drivers in points would compete for the Championship. Kurt Busch would go on to win his first and only championship of his career.

Over the next 21 years (as of December 2025), NASCAR has changed the format multiple times. In 2017, NASCAR introduced its current format known as the "NASCAR playoffs". The format involves a 26 race regular season. Points are awarded based on finishing position in each race, and drivers can earn additional points through their performance in each of a race's opening two stages. 16 drivers will qualify to run for the championship. The final ten races decides the champion by an elimination style format. 4 drivers will be eliminated every 3 races for 3 rounds. The final 4 drivers compete in a one-race showdown. Whoever finishes the highest among the 4 drivers wins the championship.

=== Criticism ===
Some fans and drivers alike have been heavy critics of this format. In 2004, most drivers were against the new format. Jimmie Johnson (who would become a 7-time champion in the playoff era) said “I just don't think it's fair. I have respect for a lot of these guys, drivers like Rusty Wallace. I just don't think anyone should be cut off (from a chance to gain points and a possible top-10 finish).”

Over the years since 2004, the playoffs have been heavily criticized. Many have said the playoff system was created haphazardly without thought or care, with the only thought going into it being entertainment and profit, never built with the intent of competition. In other words, NASCAR was trying extremely hard to manufacture a "game 7" moment, instead of focusing on improving racing.

Kyle Busch was an outspoken critic of the playoffs. Before the 2014 season, Busch said of NASCAR changing the playoff format "When they tell you, 'Here's what we're (NASCAR) thinking,' you don't really have time to bring questions or think about ways in which you can try to make it better (playoffs). You've got to have a couple days or a week. Then they say, 'We're going to have this meeting in Charlotte.' We have our whole list of questions and things we want answered or want to suggest, and it doesn't mean anything. They've already made the decision. It just hasn't been announced yet, but it's coming. So essentially it's a pointless redo of a meeting.

== Notable controversies ==
=== 2013 and "spingate" ===
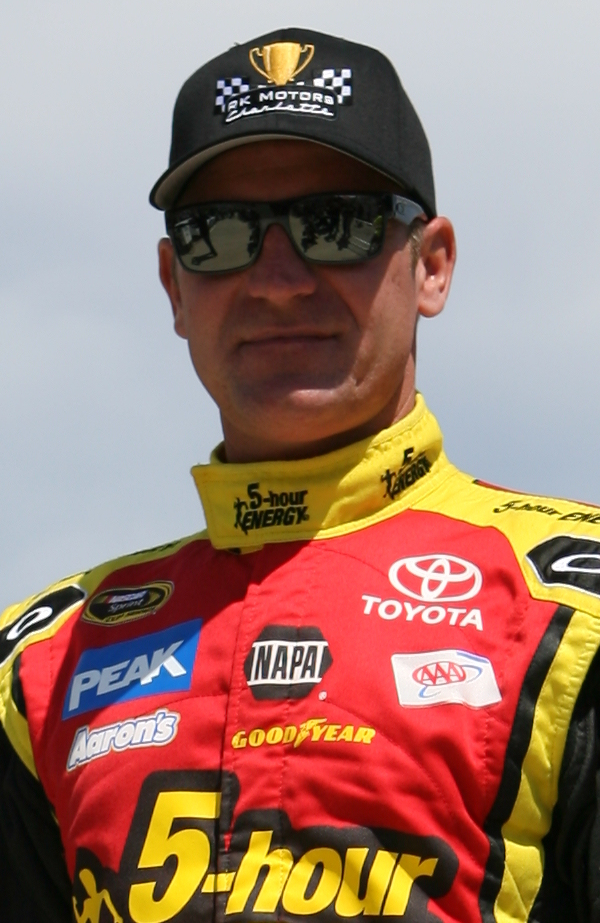
Clint Bowyer

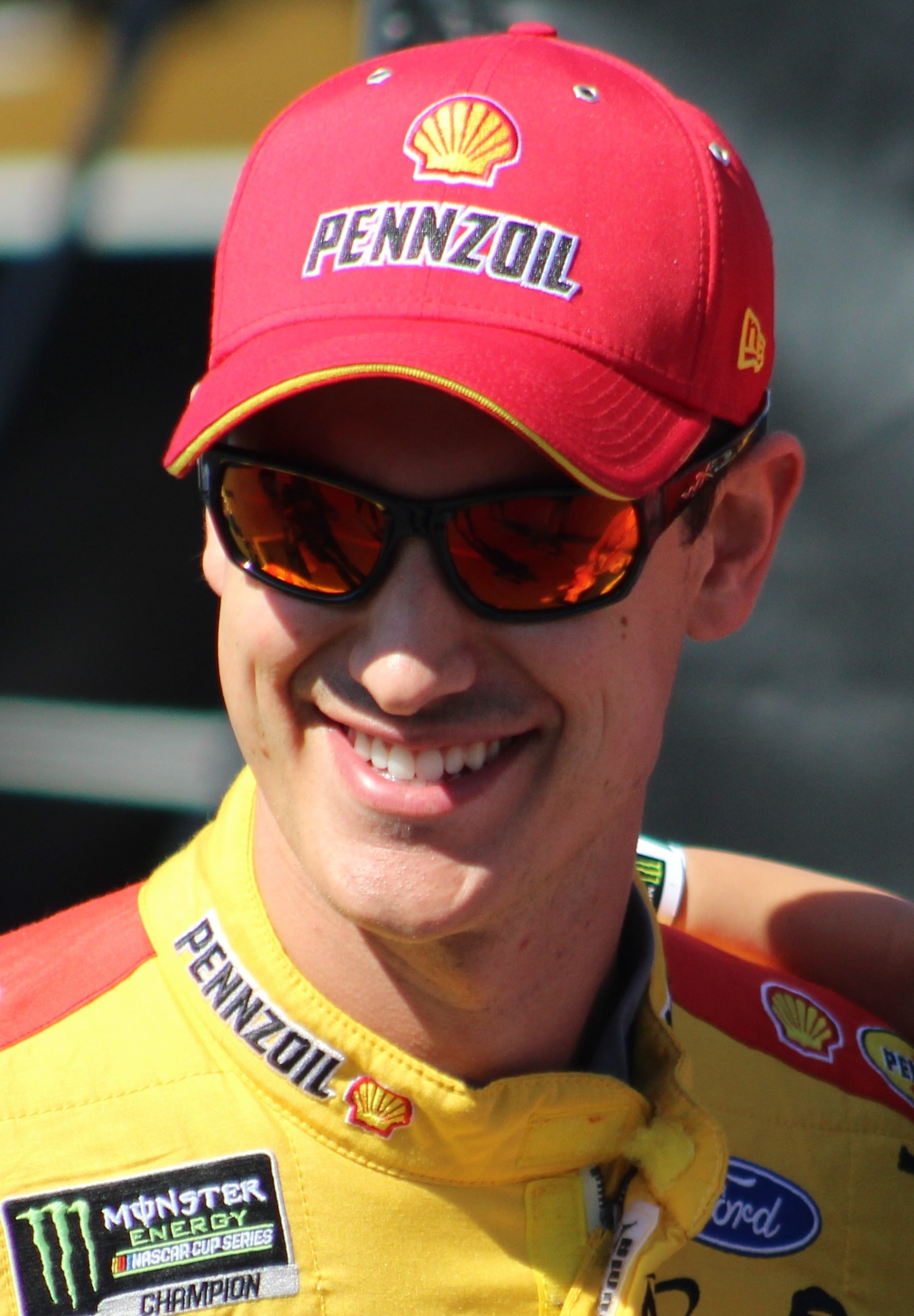
Joey Logano

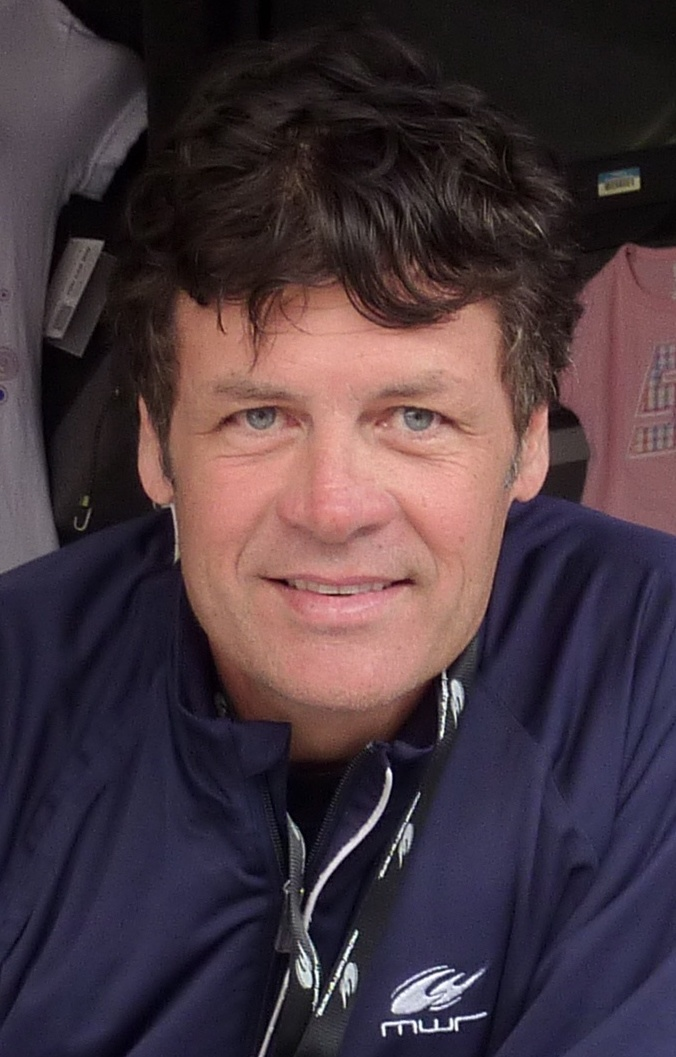
Michael Waltrip

Due to the playoff format putting so much pressure on drivers to make the Chase (or later known as the NASCAR Playoffs), it caused some drivers to cheat by either helping themselves reach the playoffs or get another teammate in.

On September 7, 2013, NASCAR's regular season finale took place at Richmond International Raceway in Richmond, VA. Heading into the race, the points where tight. Out of the 12 spots in the Chase, Jimmie Johnson, Clint Bowyer, Kevin Harvick, Carl Edwards, Kyle Busch, Matt Kenseth and Kasey Kahne had already clinched their playoff spots. That left 11 drivers to fight for the final 5 spots. Of those drivers needing help to enter the Chase was Martin Truex Jr. Heading into the race he was 12th in points. Truex would clinch at least a Wild Card spot with a victory at Richmond. He was fifteen points outside the top 10. Truex remained eligible for a top 10 spot. Truex, before the start of the race, was holding the provisional No. 2 Wild Card spot.

With seven laps to go in the 400 lap race, Clint Bowyer, who was already guaranteed a spot in the Chase, intentionally wrecked his car on the frontstretch to bring out a caution flag. This would give his teammate Martin Truex Jr a chance to gain enough positions to advance as the 12th team in the Chase. Once the race restarted, Truex's other teammate at the time, Brian Vickers, was called to pit road for no reason, which confused Vickers. Team owner Michael Waltrip called Vickers to pit road to help Truex gain another spot on the track.

In a separate incident Joey Logano, passed fellow Ford driver, Front Row's David Gilliland, late in the race, giving Logano a guaranteed berth in the playoffs, knocking out Jeff Gordon.

After an investigation into the incident, NASCAR announced that Jeff Gordon would be the 13th car in the Chase, Ryan Newman took the place of Martin Truex Jr in the Chase.

Although Bowyer's spin was the main controversy, NASCAR did not remove Logano from the Chase for also manipulating the outcome of the race. This drew heavily criticism as a double standard. David Gilliland's spotter tells his crew that Logano's team wanted Gilliland's spot on the track "and they said they'd probably be able to help us in the future", according to the review of Front Row's radio communications. "You tell that spotter up there it better pay big," replies someone believed to be Gilliland crew chief Frank Kerr. "Yeah, it's not the spotter, it's the whole committee", the spotter says.

Logano denied any wrongdoing, saying "That is new stuff to me. Obviously there is no transcript on our radio of anything said about it (and) obviously I would have known about it if that was the case"

== See also ==
- NASCAR rules and regulations
- Car of Tomorrow
- List of NASCAR tracks
- Start and park
- East Coast bias
- Criticism of ESPN
