= George Solomon =

American sportswriter and editor

- Born: 1940 or 1941 (age 85–86)
- Education: University of Florida
- Occupations: Columnist and editor, ombudsman
- Writing career
- Subject: Sports

George Solomon (born c. 1940) is an American journalist who served as a sports editor and columnist at The Washington Post and was the first ombudsman for ESPN.

== Biography ==
Solomon graduated from the University of Florida in 1963. He began working at The Washington Post in 1972. He served as assistant managing editor for sports from 1975 to 2003. From 2003 to his retirement, he was an assistant editor for the paper. He continues writing a weekly Sunday column for the paper.

As ESPN's ombudsman, Solomon was open about several potential conflicts of interest he may have had. His son, Aaron Solomon, is a producer for ESPN's panel show Around the Horn. Pardon the Interruption co-hosts Michael Wilbon and Tony Kornheiser, World Series of Poker announcer Norman Chad, and reporters Rachel Nichols and Ric Bucher all were co-workers of Solomon's during his time at the Post.

During his time as ombudsman, Solomon criticized the network for airing Bonds on Bonds, a reality series on Barry Bonds in which the controversial baseball player was able to exercise some creative control, for devoting too much coverage to the actions of controversial wide receiver Terrell Owens, for not making clear the difference between commentary and reporting on their shows, and for generally having too much sensationalism and not enough journalism in their stories. Solomon also defended the network's choice of games to broadcast and their coverage of the 2006 FIFA World Cup, which was criticized by many soccer fans. Solomon stepped down from his ESPN role at the end of his contract. On April 1, 2007, Le Anne Schreiber, a former sports editor of The New York Times, became the new ombudsman for ESPN.

Beginning in 2003, Solomon taught sports journalism classes at the University of Maryland, College Park. Solomon edited Shirley Povich's book All Those Mornings at the Post. In 2003, Solomon was honored by the Associated Press Sports Editors (APSE) organization with the Red Smith Award, which recognizes "major contributions to sports journalism."

Preceded by Position established	Ombudsman for ESPN; 2005–2007	Succeeded by Le Anne Schreiber
