= Laurentian elite =

Canadian political term

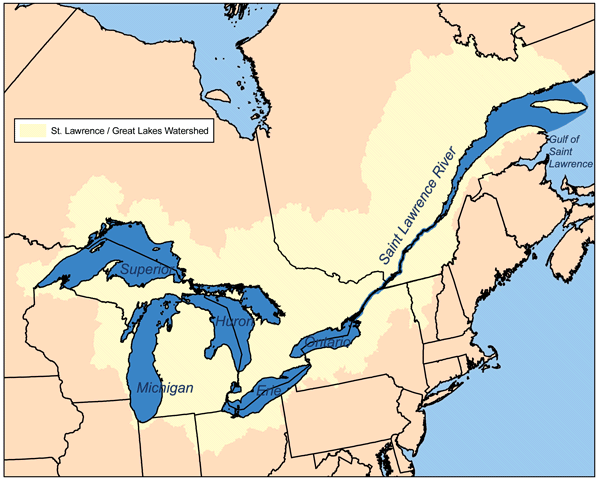
Map of the St. Lawrence River watershed, which has over half of Canada's 343 ridings; this region is known to be influential in deciding federal election results

The Laurentian elite, also referred to as the Laurentian Consensus, is a Canadian political term used to refer to individuals in the upper class of society who live along the St. Lawrence River and watershed in major Central Canadian cities such as Montreal, Ottawa and Toronto, an area which represents a significant portion of Canada’s population. The term has been used to describe the belief that a general governing political consensus existed in Canada due to the influence of the Laurentian elite from Confederation until the early 21st century.

The term is generally attributed to John Ibbitson, who wrote extensively about the Laurentian elite following the 2011 Canadian federal election (though he has shared the credit for coining it with University of Toronto academic David Cameron). Ibbitson later expanded his coverage in the book The Big Shift: The Seismic Change in Canadian Politics, Business, and Culture and What It Means for Our Future published in 2013 by Darrell Bricker and Ibbitson, in which the authors argue that the Laurentian Consensus is on course to be replaced by a new political coalition consisting of Western Canada and suburban Ontario. The term has since been adopted by other journalists and political commentators as a shorthand for the Central Canadian establishment.

== Description ==
Ibbitson described the Laurentians as "the political, academic, cultural, media and business elites" of central Canada who were responsible for shaping Canadian identity. He argued that Laurentians viewed Canada as "a fragile nation" kept together by the federal government but protected from the United States of America. Ibbitson associated the Laurentian elite with the Liberal Party of Canada and sometimes politicians from the former Progressive Conservative Party of Canada while associating "The Conservative Coalition" with prairie populism that dominates Western Canada's politics. He believes polices such as the National Policy and the Charter of Rights and Freedoms were a result of the Laurentians.

Ibbitson points to the election of Stephen Harper and the Conservative Party of Canada with a majority government in the 2011 Canadian federal election without significant support in Quebec as a sign of the decline of the Laurentian Consensus. He suggest that this gradual decline was due to infighting within the Liberal Party, immigration into the 905 region that shifted "Ontario's orientation toward the West", rising oil prices fueling economic and population growth in Western Canada, a weakening Quebec sovereignty movement, and a growing sense of patriotism. However, Ibbitson cautioned against the idea that Canada was becoming conservative by arguing that the values of the people who rejected the Laurentians were instead "realistic, pragmatic, cosmopolitan, global, forward thinking" and that progressive politicians should tailor to them.

== Reception ==
University of Toronto political scientist Andrew McDougall has identified the attributes of Laurentian rule as being in favour of "tariffs to support manufacturing [and] farming industries" (most evident in the National Policy) while being "tolerant to supportive of some internal trade barriers" and "generally pro-free trade" in the international context. With respect to the balance of power with the provinces, they are "supportive of cooperative federalism [and] shared cost programs" but still nonetheless hold a "bias towards federal power." Drawing on the work of Peter J. Smith and Donald Creighton, Michael Cuenco in American Affairs has traced the evolution of the Laurentian elite from the Confederation era to the present. Cuenco argues that they represent a distinct centralizing school of political economy, rooted in an early modern "court party" commercial liberal tradition, that carried over from the Conservative Party of Sir John A. Macdonald into the mid-century Liberal Party governments of William Lyon Mackenzie King and his successors.

Conversely, Jared Milne writing for iPolitics took issues with some aspects of Ibbitson's description of the Laurentian elite, questioned if the 2011 election results would make indigenous people and francophone Quebecers feel less alienated in this country. Milne suggested that Canada is composed groups that are a lot more similar than they realize.

== See also ==
- Politics of Canada
- Family Compact
- Château Clique
- Vertical Mosaic
- Western alienation
- Quebec sovereignty movement
