= Le Anne Schreiber =

American journalist (1945–2019)

Le Anne Screiber
- Born: August 4, 1945; Evanston, Illinois, U.S.
- Died: May 31, 2019 (aged 73); Poughkeepsie, New York, U.S.
- Occupation: Sports journalist

Le Anne Schreiber (August 4, 1945 – May 31, 2019) was an American journalist who was an ESPN ombudsman.

Schreiber replaced George Solomon in this position, who had served for twenty-one months as ombudsman. Schreiber had a two-year contract as ombudsman and wrote at least one column a month, with her tenure coming to an end in March 2009.

Prior to her work as the ESPN ombudsman, Schreiber been employed by The New York Times, first as sports editor and then as a deputy editor for The New York Times Book Review. She also covered the 1976 Montreal Olympics and was editor-in-chief of womenSports magazine. She was also a decorated journalist, having won a National Magazine Award in 1991.

Schreiber, the author of Midstream: An Intimate Journal of Loss and Discovery, was divorced and lived in rural upstate New York. She had a master's degree from Harvard and had been a professor at University at Albany, SUNY and Columbia. Her book Light Years was a New York Times 1996 Notable Book of the Year.

Originally from Evanston, Illinois, she moved to Texas and received her bachelor's degree from Rice in 1967.

Schreiber died in Poughkeepsie, New York from lung cancer in 2019, at the age of 73.

Preceded by George Solomon	Ombudsman for ESPN; 2007–2009	Succeeded by Don Ohlmeyer
