= TNT Sports (United Kingdom) =

British sports broadcasting pay television channel brand

- Formerly: BT Sport (2013–2023); Eurosport (1989–2025)
- Type: Division
- Industry: Sportscasting
- Founded: 1 August 2013; 13 years ago
- Headquarters: Chiswick Park, London, United Kingdom
- Area served: United Kingdom; Ireland
- Brands: List: TNT Sports 1; TNT Sports 2; TNT Sports 3; TNT Sports 4; TNT Sports 5; TNT Sports 6; TNT Sports 7; TNT Sports 8; TNT Sports 9; TNT Sports 10; TNT Sports Ultimate; TNT Sports Box Office; TNT Sports Box 2; TNT Sports Films
- Owners: BT Group; Skydance
- Parent: WBD Sports
- Website: tntsports.co.uk

TNT Sports United Kingdom (formerly BT Sport) is a British sportscasting pay television channel brand which serves the United Kingdom and Ireland. First launched by BT Group in 2013 as an outlet for their recently acquired sports rights portfolio, it is now co-owned and operated by Skydance under their WBD Sports division after merging with Eurosport UK.

Originally operating from Here East, based at the former International Broadcast Centre in Queen Elizabeth Olympic Park, the service has been based at the Warner Bros. Discovery complex in Chiswick Business Park since July 2023.

The brand's channels are available on BT TV, Sky and Virgin Media in the UK and Sky and Vodafone TV in Ireland.

== History ==
=== Premier League deal, launch ===
First BT Sport logo, used from 2013-2018.

News of BT's first foray into sports broadcasting first came about on 12 June 2012, when it was announced that it had won the rights to 38 live Premier League matches for three seasons from the 2013–14 season, beating ESPN UK, which had held the shared rights with Sky Sports the previous season. BT announced at the same time that it would be launching its own channel for its new football coverage. The news followed speculation that ESPN was reconsidering its position in the UK. The following months also saw BT win rights to Premiership Rugby and its associated 7s Series, as well as American, Brazilian, French and Italian top-flight football.

On 25 February 2013, BT announced an agreement to acquire ESPN's television networks in the UK and Ireland, including ESPN and international sports channel ESPN America; this agreement gave BT rights to the FA Cup beginning in 2013–14, the Bundesliga and UEFA Europa League through 2015, and the Scottish Premier League through 2017, as well as other international event rights licensed through ESPN. The value of the deal was not disclosed, but BT was understood to be paying "low tens of millions". The deal was expected to close by 31 July, and BT was expected to operate at least one ESPN-branded channel as part of the BT Sport service.

BT made other notable rights deals ahead of BT Sport's launch, including UFC mixed martial arts under a three-year deal, and MotoGP beginning in 2014, under a five-year deal. In May 2013, BT announced that BT Sport would be offered for free to its internet subscribers via streaming. Media analyst Steve Hewlett felt that BT's entry into the sport market was an effort to help strengthen its triple play business and, in particular, help retain internet subscribers lost to Sky (which he believed would result in greater financial loss than those that would be sustained by operating BT Sport).

BT Sport launched on 1 August 2013. On 12 August, BT reported that over 1,000,000 households had subscribed to the service ahead of the start of the 2013–14 Premier League, although admitting that the majority of them were BT internet subscribers.

The interactive service BT Sport Extra launched in 2014. In January 2015, BT Sport renewed its licensing agreement with ESPN International under a seven-year deal, allowing it to continue operating an ESPN-branded network as part of BT Sport, and hold rights to ESPN original programming, and event broadcast rights that are distributed internationally by ESPN.

=== UEFA deal, expansion ===
On 9 November 2013, BT Sport announced that it had acquired the rights to the UEFA Champions League and Europa League beginning in 2015–16, under a three-year deal valued at £897 million, replacing Sky and ITV.

On 9 June 2015, BT announced it would launch a new channel, BT Sport Europe, which would carry all UEFA Champions League and Europa League matches. Concurrently it was announced that only the BT Sport 1 channel would be free to BT internet subscribers, and that BT Sport 2, Europe and ESPN would require viewers to subscribe for £5 extra. BT also announced a Freeview HD channel known as BT Sport Showcase, which would carry 12 Champions League matches and 14 Europa League matches per season on a free-to-air basis, including at least one match per-round, each English club appearing at least once per-season, and coverage of the Champions League and Europa League finals.

BT Sport also announced that it would launch BT Sport Ultra HD, the first 4K sports channel in the UK, on 2 August for the 2015 FA Community Shield. The channel would initially be exclusive to BT TV on BT Infinity, with a 4K service package and compatible YouView set-top box. In 2016, BT Sport Europe was renamed BT Sport 3.

In 2017, BT Sport began an agreement with boxing promoter Frank Warren, under which Warren's channel BoxNation would be distributed as part of the BT Sport service, and that BT Sport and BoxNation would co-produce and simulcast 20 cards per-year on Saturday nights. In April 2018, BT Sport announced a pay-per-view service, BT Sport Box Office, with an intent to broadcast premium boxing events. On 2 August 2019, BT Sport relaunched its 4K channel as BT Sport Ultimate, and began to offer Dolby Atmos sound and high dynamic range (HDR) on supported devices.

On 20 June 2019, BT Sport announced an agreement to carry the programming and pay-per-views of U.S. professional wrestling promotion WWE, ending a relationship with Sky Sports that dated back to the network's launch in 1989.

=== Joint venture with Warner Bros. Discovery, TNT Sports ===
Former BT Sport logo from 2019-2023

In April 2021, it was reported that BT was exploring a sale of all or part of BT Sport, in order to focus more on its fibreoptic services. Rumoured suitors included Amazon.com Inc. (which is one of the Premier League's current rightsholders), the sports streaming provider DAZN (which had notably beat out Sky Italia for exclusive domestic rights to Serie A football), and ESPN majority-owner Disney. By September 2021, DAZN was reported to be in "advanced talks" with BT. However, in December, it was reported that negotiations had stalled, and that Discovery—who owns competitor Eurosport and was preparing to merge with WarnerMedia to form Warner Bros. Discovery (WBD)—was negotiating a joint venture with BT to combine their respective networks. In February 2022, the two companies entered exclusive negotiations.

On 11 May 2022 Warner Bros. Discovery EMEA announced that it had reached an agreement to combine its Eurosport UK business with BT Sport in a 50–50 joint venture, in a transaction scheduled to be completed by the end of 2022 pending approval from regulators and sports bodies. Under the agreement, WBD would assume the operations of BT Sport, and merge them with Eurosport under a new brand. WBD will pay £93 million to BT over three years; if performance targets are met, WBD will pay a bonus of up to £540 million. The company will also have the option to buy out more of BT's stake in the venture. As part of the agreement, BT agreed to distribute WBD's Discovery+ streaming service—the home for Eurosport—at no charge to most BT TV subscribers, and those who subscribe to BT Sport via the company directly.

The venture was approved by the Competition and Markets Authority on 22 July 2022, and the merger was completed on 1 September. On 1 August 2022, BT Sport ESPN was rebranded as BT Sport 4, while the BT Sport Extra overflow channels were rebranded as BT Sport 5 through to 10.

On 21 February 2023, it was announced that BT Sport would rebrand as TNT Sports on 18 July 2023, ahead of the 2023–24 football season; the branding is derived from WBD's American general entertainment channel TNT (which has historically carried sports coverage, such as the NBA; the brand had also previously operated in the UK), and has also been used by WarnerMedia sports networks in Latin and South America. It was stated that the Eurosport UK channels would be folded into TNT Sports no later than the 2026 Winter Olympics. The network's new brand identity was developed by DixonBaxi, using a "viewfinder" formed from rotated "T" letters as a visual motif, and using the "N" from the logo as a homophone of "and" to join pairs of concepts (such as fixtures).

In January 2025, WBD announced that Eurosport would be discontinued in the UK and Ireland on 28 February, with its content to be folded into TNT Sports platforms afterward.

On 17 May 2025, the Financial Times reported that WBD was preparing to invoke its option to acquire BT's stake in TNT Sports.

In June 2025, it was reported that WBD would be ending an agreement with Red Bee Media to handle playout for the TNT Sports channels in August 2025, and re-locating these operations in-house at a WBD facility in Atlanta, United States.

== Availability ==
In the UK, TNT Sports is available in standard definition with all BT TV packages for BT Broadband customers. The 4K channel TNT Sports Ultimate is also available to BT Superfast Fibre customers for an additional fee. TNT Sports operates six part-time overflow channels, originally branded as BT Sport Extra, but branded since July 2023 as TNT Sports 5–10. They are carried via the red button on Sky and Virgin Media, and displayed as individual channels on the BT EPG. TNT Sports is also available to EE mobile phone contract customers to view via TNT Sports & Discovery+ apps or to stream via Discovery Plus' website. This can be streamed on a laptop or PC which is a stark contrast to how BT Sports used to work.

On Sky, TNT Sports 1 only is currently offered for free to broadband subscribers as 'TNT Sports Lite', regardless of what subscription they have. Plusnet TV also offered the same until 1 November 2021 when their TV brand was discontinued, however, TNT Sports is still available to Plusnet customers via the app service. Customers who wish to view the remaining channels can subscribe to the 'TNT Sports Pack' in either standard or high definition. BT also provide broadband subscribers access to the channels via the Discovery+ app.

Virgin Media customers receive TNT Sports 1, 2, 3, 4, and Ultimate as part of their "Full House" bundle however, they do not receive AMC from BT.

TalkTalk TV customers subscribed to the TNT Sports Pack in order to receive the entire range of channels.

In addition, Freeview HD customers received BT Sport Showcase and Virgin Media customers received BT Sport Free. They closed on 30 June 2018.

On 4 December 2018, the SD versions of BT Sport and BT Sport ESPN stopped broadcasting on Virgin Media.

On 6 February 2019, BT Sport released the app for Xbox One. It was later released for PlayStation 4 on 31 May 2019. On 8 September 2020, BT Sport also launched on Fire TV, Android TV and Roku TV. On 18 July 2023, following the rebrand to TNT Sports, the channels became available on the Discovery+ service for viewers in the UK, with the BT Sport application discontinued on all platforms from 12 October 2023.

On 9 February 2026, it was announced that HBO Max would launch in the UK and Ireland on 26 March 2026, replacing Discovery+ as the streaming home for TNT Sports.

== Programming ==
Plans for the channels launch came about when it was announced in June 2012 that the broadcast rights to the Premier League from the 2013–14 to 2015–16 seasons were awarded to BT and Sky, outbidding existing broadcaster ESPN for the rights. BT showed 38 live matches from the Premier League each season, including 18 first pick matches, from the 2013/14 season til the end of the 2015/16 season.

In October 2012, BT announced it had also agreed deals to air Serie A, Ligue 1, Brasileirão and Major League Soccer, all of which were previously broadcast on ESPN, as well as Premiership Rugby.

In January 2013, BT announced it would also broadcast Women's Tennis Association matches from 21 tournaments.

On 25 February 2013, BT announced that it had acquired ESPN's UK channels and their sports broadcasting rights, including rights to the FA Cup, UEFA Europa League, Scottish Premier League, Bundesliga and NASCAR. This led to the shutting down of ESPN Classic and ESPN America in favour of the BT Sport channels.

On 7 May 2013, BT Sport acquired the rights to air Ultimate Fighting Championship (UFC) events and taped programming in the UK and Ireland for three years, from 1 August. Two days later it was announced that BT Sport had acquired an exclusive five-year deal to broadcast MotoGP races from the 2014 season, including free practices and qualifying as well as full coverage of Moto2 and Moto3. BT Sport also broadcasts the FA WSL, A-League and programming from Red Bull Media House.

On 9 May 2013, BT announced that it had acquired the exclusive UK TV rights to MotoGP along with the Moto2 and Moto3 championships. Later in May, BT Sport acquired rights to the Football Conference for two years with 25–30 live games a season, including the end-of-season play-offs.

In January 2014, it was reported that BT Sport had acquired the rights to broadcast the World Rally Championship for the 2014 season.

=== Football coverage ===
BT Sport has carried the Premier League since its launch; as of the 2020–21 season, BT Sport holds rights to around 52 live matches per-season, including 32 Saturday matches with 12:30 p.m. kickoffs, and 20 midweek fixtures scheduled around the winter break in January and February.

On 9 November 2013, BT announced a £897 million deal with UEFA to broadcast the Champions League and Europa League exclusively on BT Sport from the 2015–16 season for three years. The deal ended two decades of the competition being broadcast free-to-air on ITV, although BT stated that the finals of both competitions and at least one match per season involving each participating British team would still be broadcast free-to-air (doing so via the BT Sport Showcase channel). TNT will show the event until 2027, after which the rights will move to streaming services Amazon Prime and Paramount+.

For the 2016–17 season, BT Sport premiered the studio programme BT Sport Score, which airs on Saturday matchdays and competes primarily with Sky's Soccer Saturday.

BT Sport has held rights to the National League since 2013, which were most recently renewed in 2020; BT Sport carries a weekly match on Saturdays, and the weekly National League highlights show. It has also carried the FA Trophy and FA Vase matches.

It has also carried France's Ligue 1 since 2013, and Italy's Serie A (which most recently returned to the network in 2021).

On 15 February 2024, it was announced that TNT Sports had agreed a four-year deal with the Football Association to show the FA Cup from the 2025–26 season. BT Sport had previously aired the competition from its launch until 2020–21, after which BT Sport's share of the rights had transferred to ITV.

From 2015 to 2020, BT Sport held exclusive live coverage of the FA Community Shield. From 2021, these rights transferred to ITV but moved to TNT Sports in 2025.

=== Rugby union coverage ===
==== Premiership Rugby ====
BT became a senior broadcast partner of Premiership Rugby in 2013–14. The original Premiership coverage deal ran until the 2016–17 season and allowed BT Sport to exclusively broadcast up to 69 live games per season. The Aviva Premiership's viewing figures rose by 40% in TV audiences in its first season with BT Sport. A third deal was signed in December 2020 to cover Premiership Rugby and the Premiership Rugby Cup until 2024. The deal covers up to 80 matches a season from 2016 to 2017 and introduced an extended highlights programme from the 2015–16 season. Subsequently, in 2017 Channel 5 announced a deal that would see them simulcast five matches per season until the end of the 2020–21 season. ITV subsequently took over the simulcasting rights, broadcasting up to 6 league season matches and the final between the 2021–22 and 2023–24 seasons.

The deal with BT Sport also sees them exclusively broadcast the league's associated sevens series and the Premiership Rugby Cup. BT Sport also had exclusive live rights to the Anglo-Welsh Cup from 2016–17 until its final competition in 2017–18.

==== Premiership Women's Rugby ====
BT Sport originally only had rights to show both the semi-finals and the final of Premiership Women's Rugby in the 2022–23 season. Ahead of the 2023–24 season, TNT gained broadcasting rights to one game per weekend as well as both the semi-finals and the final. As part of the deal, there is provision for a free-to-air provider to show both the semi-finals and final alongside TNT.

=== Cricket coverage ===
In August 2015, BT Sport acquired rights to Cricket Australia under a five-year deal starting in the 2016–17 season; the package included rights to internationals hosted by Australia (including English tours of Australia such as the 2017–18 Ashes series), as well as rights to the domestic Big Bash League. BT Sport renewed its rights in the 2021–22 season, holding rights to Australian internationals through the 2025 season (including the 2021–22 Ashes series); the rights to the BBL and Women's Big Bash League were sold separately to Sky Sports. In February 2021, BT also reached deals for New Zealand and West Indies home matches.

In January 2024, TNT announced its first major cricket rights acquisition when it obtained the rights to the India national cricket team from 2024 to 2028. The deal is signed just a few days prior to the start of the India v England test series.

=== Motorsport coverage ===
TNT Sports' flagship motorsports event is MotoGP. In addition it shows the Moto2, Moto3, Red Bull MotoGP Rookies Cup and JuniorGP. Suzi Perry hosts the coverage alongside pundits Colin Edwards, Sylvain Guintoli, Michael Laverty and Neil Hodgson. Commentary is provided by Gavin Emmett and Hodgson, with Charlie Hiscott joined for Friday sessions coverage. Natalie Quirk appears as reporter. Emmett also presents Chequered Flag which is aired after the MotoGP race has finished.

The channel also has live broadcasts of the World Rally Championship (since 2014) and Formula E (since 2024). The FIA World Endurance Championship (2014–2020, since 2025) is also shown. Previous coverage included the FIA European Formula Three Championship (2015–2018), British Formula Three Championship (2015–2017), World Series by Renault (2014–2018), Deutsche Tourenwagen Masters (2014–2023), International GT Open (2014–2019) and now also shows the Supercars Championship (2014–2023, since 2025).

=== Tennis coverage ===
Eurosport's pan-European rights to Roland-Garros moved to TNT Sports in 2025; in conjunction with the move, TNT Sports began collaborating with its American sister division to produce coverage of the tournament for its local outlets, as part of its own rights to the tournament which began that year.

Also, TNT Sports inherited Eurosport's coverage of the Wimbledon Championships, which sees the channel air highlights of the tournament plus live coverage of the two singles finals.

=== Multi-sports events coverage ===
In December 2025, it was announced that TNT had outbid the BBC to be the main broadcaster of the 2026 Commonwealth Games This adds to TNT's coverage of multi-sports events which also includes the Olympic Games, to which TNT has full access until 2032.

=== American sports coverage ===
BT Sport showed extensive coverage of American sports, including Major League Baseball (MLB), College sport, Major League Lacrosse and the X Games. This was supplemented by BT Sport's long-term agreement with ESPN to carry its original programming (including original documentaries and studio programmes), and events whose international rights are owned by ESPN International. However, when TNT Sports replaced BT Sport in 2023, it continued its coverage of baseball, but dropped its coverage of college sport.

=== World Poker Tour ===
In February, the World Poker Tour (WPT) announced a new deal with BT Sports to broadcast the World Poker Tour in the UK and Ireland across BT Sports networks. The company will broadcast season XV of the WPT, which took place from 2016 to 2017. Highlights from the season include the first WPT victory of poker commentator Mike Sexton and the first victory by a woman in an open WPT event.

== Previous coverage ==
=== Boxing ===
Since 2017, BT Sport has an association with BoxNation to show certain live fights from Frank Warren Promotions. On 15 September 2018 BT Sport showed its first boxing pay-per-view boxing event – the rematch between Gennady Golovkin and Saul Alvarez and on 1 December 2018 BT showed the Deontay Wilder vs. Tyson Fury fight. Both were shown on BT's pay-per-view channel BT Sport Box Office. Paul Dempsey leads the coverage alongside Richie Woodhall, Steve Bunce and other guests. John Rawling and Barry Jones provide commentary with Caroline Pearce or Ronald McIntosh the ringside reporters.

TNT's coverage of Queensberry Boxing finished at the end of April 2025, with the rights moving to streaming service DAZN.

=== Professional wrestling ===
On June 20, 2019, U.S. professional wrestling promotion WWE announced that its programming would move to BT Sport in the beginning of 2020 (with pay-per-view programs sold via BT Sport Box Office), ending a relationship with Sky Sports that dated back to the network's launch in 1989. As well as live shows, BT Sport also shows repeated highlights of Raw, SmackDown, NXT, NXT UK and pay-per-views. In addition, it shows certain WWE Network programs, such as WWE Ruthless Aggression and WWE 24, as well as special editions of No Filter WWE.

Due to COVID-19 restrictions, WWE were unable to film their NXT UK shows under typical circumstances. To resolve this, BT let WWE utilise a set at the BT London Studios. NXT UK recommenced tapings on September 17, 2020.

The deal between WWE and TNT Sports expired in January 2025, where all WWE content in the UK is now broadcast through Netflix as part of a new arrangement.

=== Football ===
Scottish Professional Football League

BT hosted rights to show 30 Scottish Professional Football League games a season, sharing the rights with Sky Sports and BBC Alba. Darrell Currie was the main presenter with pundits including Chris Sutton, Stephen Craigan, Ally McCoist, Michael Stewart and Alex Rae. All of these pundits also contributed to co-commentary duty alongside Derek Rae, Rory Hamilton, or Rob MacLean who were the lead commentators. From the 2016–17 season, BT Sport had aired a 30-minute preview show "Scottish Football Extra" before every live match. From the 2020–21 season, all 48 live SPFL Premiership matches will be on Sky Sports.

Scottish League Cup

From the start of the 2016–17 season, BT Sport had been the home of exclusive live coverage of the Scottish League Cup, showing two or three live matches per round, from July through to the final in November. The same personnel used on the SPFL coverage was used on Scottish League Cup coverage. From 2020, Premier Sports took over the rights for the competition, showing 12 to 16 games per season.

Bundesliga

BT Sport had full exclusive rights to the Bundesliga and 2. Bundesliga. Lead commentators include Ben Andrews, Steve Bower, Simon Brotherton, Paul Dempsey, Dave Farrar, Alistair Mann, Jonathan Pearce, John Roder, Oliver Wilson and Steven Wyeth. The co-commentators include Jim Beglin, Tony Dorigo, Kevin Gallacher, Don Hutchison, Chris Perry, Stewart Robson and Nigel Spackman. Occasionally, Premier League pundit and ex Bayern Munich player, Owen Hargreaves also contributes to co-commentary. BT Sport lost rights to the Bundesliga from the 2021–22 season onwards for the next 4 years to Sky Sports.

DFB Pokal

BT Sport previously broadcast DFB-Pokal. From the start of the 2018–19 season, coverage moved to Eleven Sports for a season only,.

CONMEBOL Libertadores

Previously, BT Sport showed both 2018 Copa Libertadores Finals between the Argentine Superclásico rivals Boca Juniors and River Plate; in simulcast with FreeSports. A year later, the Copa Libertadores final coverage moved to BBC Two.

Süper Lig

Towards the end of the 2019–20 season, BT Sport began showing 3 games a week from the Turkish Süper Lig.

=== Rugby Union ===
==== European Professional Club Rugby ====
BT originally shared rights to European Professional Club Rugby (EPCR)'s champions and challenge cups with Sky Sports. The shared nature of the deal meant each broadcaster would exclusively broadcast up to 30 pool matches, 2 quarter-finals and 1 semi-final from each competition with the finals being shown by both. BT also received first pick on Champions Cup matches involving Premiership Rugby clubs.

For seven seasons from the 2018–19 season, BT Sport became the official broadcast partner of the Champions and Challenge cups and broadcast up to 134 matches per season. The Challenge Cup will be shown exclusively on BT Sport whilst broadcasting of the Champions Cup was shared with Channel 4 in the UK and Virgin Media Sport in the Republic of Ireland until 2022 and with ITV and RTÉ from 2022 to 2024. Both channels simulcast one match from each round and the final.

=== Cricket ===
Caribbean Premier League

BT have broadcast all 34 matches from the Caribbean Premier League most recently in 2017. Sky Sports took over the rights from the 2018 edition onwards.

Indian Premier League

In 2019, BT Sport also won rights off Sky Sports to broadcast every match of the 2019 Indian Premier League, however from the 2020 Indian Premier League the rights switched back to Sky Sports.

=== Tennis ===
In January 2013, BT Sport signed a deal with the WTA to show 21 live tournaments from the women's tennis tour. The coverage consisted of up to 800 live hours of coverage every year until 2016, each season ending with the WTA Finals.

From January 2017, BT Sport had the rights to show 52 WTA tournaments every year until 2019. Coverage on most competitions took feeds from the WTA international TV feed, but with larger events from the Premier Mandatory and Premier 5 category matches, Sam Smith or occasionally Annabel Croft presented coverage alongside Martina Navratilova. Lead commentary was provided by Chris Bradnam, David Law and David Mercer alongside co-commentators, Annabel Croft, Nigel Sears, Anne Keothavong and Jo Durie.

The last competition on BT Sport was the 2019 WTA Finals in which Clare Balding presented coverage alongside Anne Keothavong and Jo Durie. With Annabel Croft and Nigel Sears reporting from Shenzhen. Lead commentary came from David Law and David Mercer alongside Keothavong and Durie.

For the 2020 WTA Tour onwards, Amazon Prime Video are now the exclusive UK broadcaster, showing 49 tournaments a year.

=== Darts ===
BDO Darts coverage

It was announced in December 2014 that BT Sport would share the rights to the 2015 BDO World Darts Championship alongside BBC Sport. Coverage would be presented by Ray Stubbs for the first two years of their coverage. In August 2016 it signed a new 2-year deal to share rights this time with Channel 4. Matt Smith took over as presenter with Chris Mason as studio pundit and Reshmin Chowdhury as roving reporter. Commentators on BT Sport Darts coverage included John Rawling, Jim Proudfoot, Vassos Alexander and Paul Nicholson. BT Sport did not renew their contract for the 2019 tournament and the rights are now held by QUEST and Eurosport

=== American Sport ===
NBA

BT Sport had inherited the rights to the NBA from ESPN UK. In the 2017–18 NBA season, BT Sport lost the rights to Sky. TNT Sports regained the rights ahead of the 2023–24 NBA season, with plans to broadcast at least nine games per-week throughout the regular season. This continued for two seasons until they passed back to Sky Sports for the 2025–26 season under a new multi-year deal.

WNBA

The Women's NBA games also moved to Sky Sports from the 2018–2019 season.

NCAA

Throughout its decade on air, BT Sport showed extensive coverage of American College sports, particularly NCAA football and NCAA basketball. BT Sport gave over significant parts of its schedules to this coverage, often showing two, sometimes three, College Football games simultaneously. The coverage was enhanced by BT Sport broadcasting ESPN's studio-related College Sport programming via a long-term agreement with ESPN to carry its original programming, which also included original documentaries and studio programmes, alongside events whose international rights were owned by ESPN International. This ended when TNT Sports replaced BT Sport in July 2023 and TNT Sports subsequently decided to drop all coverage of College Sport. These were the only rights that TNT Sports decided not to continue showing when it replaced BT Sport.

== Magazine shows ==
=== Current ===
- UFC: Beyond The Octagon - Presented by Adam Catterall alongside Gareth A Davies and Dan Hardy
- UEFA Champions League Magazine

=== Former ===
- BT Sport Score (2016–2023) Saturdays at 3:00 pm. The programme kept viewers up to date with the latest scores from across the UK and Europe, and was presented by Darrell Currie and Jules Breach who were joined by various pundits.
- ESPN FC - A football debate show alongside a list of pundits and writers including Craig Burley, Stewart Robson, Steve McManaman, Steve Nicol, and Don Hutchison. This programme has not been seen since BT Sport was relaunched as TNT Sports in July 2023.
- College GameDay (football TV program) - ESPN's pre-game show for College Football. This was shown in full almost every week. This, along with other related College Football programming from ESPN, ended when TNT Sports decided not to continue showing the NCAA when it replaced BT Sport in July 2023. The programme eventually transferred to Sky Sports when Sky took over coverage of NCAA Football and Basketball in November 2023.
- Baseball Tonight - Again this stopped being broadcast when TNT Sports replaced BT Sport.
- Rugby Tonight - Sundays at 17:15 pm sees Martin Bayfield, Ugo Monye and Lawrence Dallaglio present a debate about rugby union. Their guests include current and former players and referees reviewing and previewing the Gallagher Premiership and the Heineken Champions Cup. Cancelled in July 2023 as part of a review into studio programming before the TNT Sports rebrand.
- Boxing Tonight - Presented by Paul Dempsey

== Documentaries ==
BT Sport produced a series of feature-length sports documentary films under the title BT Sport Films. Among the films shown on the channel are The Beautiful Game, I Believe in Miracles and Don't Take Me Home. Documentaries that have been critically well-received include Rocky & Wrighty: From Brockley To The Big Time, about childhood friends David Rocastle and Ian Wright, Shoulder To Shoulder, on the Ireland national rugby union team during The Troubles, and Brothers in Football, which tells the story of Corinthian Football Club.

TNT Sports is continuing to show new documentaries as well as showing repeats of BT Sport Films.

== Classic sport ==
BT Sport's weekday daytime schedules often included sporting action from yesteryear. Football features heavily and includes league matches from the 1970s and 1980s from both the ITV Sport, including full editions of The Big Match, and the BBC's Match of the Day archives. Also featured are FA Cup matches from the 1970s to the present day and UEFA Champions League matches. Other archive sporting action included boxing matches from the ESPN and ITV Sport archives as well as MotoGP races and Australian cricket.

TNT continues to show classic sport, but without the ESPN content.

== See also ==
- TNT Sports 4
- TNT Sports Box Office
