= BT Sport Films =

- Genre: Sports documentary
- Directed by: various
- Country of origin: United Kingdom
- Original language: English

Production
- Producer: Adam Darke

Original release
- Network: BT Sport
- Release: 3 August 2013 – present

BT Sport Films are a series of feature-length sports documentary films airing on the British subscription sports channels BT Sport. While the majority of films are about football, other sports covered include rugby, cricket, boxing, UFC, judo, speedway and MotoGP.

In July 2023, TNT Sports replaced BT Sport but repeats of BT Sport Films continue to be shown, alongside new films, under the banner of TNT Sports Films.

== Background ==
The initial run of seven films was conceived prior to the launch of BT Sport in 2013, with the first film being shown on the channel's third day on air. The commissioning editors for the series have been Jamie Hindhaugh, Barry Andrews, Sally Brown, Simon Green and Grant Best.

A number of the films have received a limited theatrical release, in which case BT Sport Films is usually credited as one of the production companies.

On most occasions, the first transmission of a film will be commercial-free, with versions including commercial breaks used for subsequent broadcasts. The films are shown on the BT Sport channels alongside documentaries from ESPN, including 30 for 30, Nine for IX, SEC Storied and Backstory, as well as official MotoGP films. In 2015, the channel also had a season of Warren Miller ski and snowboarding films.

== List of films ==
No.	Title	Directed by	Original release date
1	UFC: The Story So Far	Adam Darke	3 August 2013
A look at the history of the Ultimate Fighting Championship, telling the story of the sport's creation and its growth into a global sporting enterprise.
2	Silver Lining	Adam Darke	6 August 2013
A portrait of two British judokas in the 2012 Summer Olympics, Gemma Gibbons and Euan Burton, and the contrast in their fortunes and emotions.
3	Football Outposts	Adam Darke	11 August 2013
Tom Watt embarks on a journey to various British football outposts, from Arbroath to Accrington Stanley.
4	Winning Ugly	Adam Darke	3 August 2013
Former England rugby union hooker Brian Moore looks back to the hard playing, hard drinking, win-at-all-costs mentality of sport in the 1970s and '80s and comparing it to what some would term the more sanitised world of modern sport.
5	Keeping up with the Brownlees	Adam Darke	17 September 2013
A profile of triathletes Alistair and Jonny Brownlee, looking into the unique dynamics of sporting rivals who are also brothers.
6	Cornered	Adam Darke	22 October 2013
Journeyman boxer Johnny Greaves is followed as he works towards 100 professional fights, accepting fights at short notice and for little money to provide for his young family.
7	O Arise, All You Sons	Adam Darke	25 December 2013
A look at how cricket united one of the most dangerous, disparate and poverty stricken countries on earth and gave the people of Papua New Guinea purpose and identity.
8	An Ordinary Hero: The Mike Hailwood Story	Jon Carey and Adam Darke	26 March 2014
A portrait of tragic motorcycle rider Mike Hailwood and the daredevil world of motorsport in the 1970s and '80s.
9	Walk On	Ian Lysaght	14 April 2014
A look at how the Rodgers and Hammerstein show tune You'll Never Walk Alone became one of the world's most famous and emotional sporting anthems.
10	Football Outposts: Europe	Adam Darke	11 May 2014
Tom Watt travels to European football outposts, from the Faroe Islands to Kazakhstan.
11	The Beautiful Game	Victor Buhler	19 May 2014
In a revised edit of the original film, Archbishop Desmond Tutu, F. W. de Klerk, Kofi Annan and a range of players talk about the influence of football on the continent of Africa.
12	The Crazy Gang: When Wimbledon Won the Cup	Adam Darke	26 December 2014
Using interviews, archive footage and animated scenes, the story of Wimbledon's unlikely rise from non-league obscurity to winning the 1988 FA Cup Final in less than a decade.
13	Football's Final Frontier with David James	Unknown	5 April 2015
The former England goalkeeper looks at the potential for the growth of football in India, having served as player-manager at Kerala Blasters.
14	One Day in May: The Story of The Bradford City Fire	Isobel Williams	11 May 2015
Thirty years on from witnessing the Valley Parade fire first-hand as a child, Gabby Logan remembers one of the worst disasters in English football history in a poignant documentary.
15	I Believe in Miracles	Jonny Owen	16 February 2016
To a soundtrack of funk and soul music from the 1970s, this film tells the story of Nottingham Forest's rise, under Brian Clough and Peter Taylor, to becoming European champions in 1979 and 1980.
16	Ali: The Fighter's Journey	Unknown	2 March 2016
The remarkable story of Muhammad Ali, focusing on his heavyweight title fights with Sonny Liston in 1964 and George Foreman in 1974.
17	Football Outposts: When They Were Giants	Unknown	5 April 2016
In the third of the Football Outposts series, Tom Watt travels to clubs that were once giants of European football including Nottingham Forest, Aberdeen and Steaua Bucharest.
18	Rocky & Wrighty: From Brockley To The Big Time	Tom Boswell	4 January 2017
A look at how childhood friends David Rocastle and Ian Wright, one a teenage prodigy and the other a late bloomer, went on to become Arsenal legends.
19	Ref: Stories From the Weekend	Daryl Goodrich	4 April 2017
An in-depth look at the world of the football referee, from the global scrutiny of the Premier League to the often rowdy and intimidating Sunday morning park games.
20	Iron Man: The Sean Fallon Story	Mark Kendrick and Luke Massey	25 May 2017
Adapted from the book Sean Fallon: Celtic's Iron Man, the story of one of the club's greatest heroes.
21	Don't Take Me Home	Jonny Owen	27 June 2017
Following the players and supporters of the Wales national football team at their first major tournament in 58 years, UEFA Euro 2016, and featuring music from Jacques Dutronc, Richard Hawley, Mogwai and Super Furry Animals among others, this film takes a look at a campaign that Welsh football will never forget.
22	Packer – The Man who Changed Cricket	Akshay Sharma	4 November 2017
A look at how the Australian media mogul Kerry Packer's controversial breakaway World Series Cricket changed the game of cricket.
23	No Hunger in Paradise	Tom Boswell	7 January 2018
Based on his book of the same name, Michael Calvin examines football's academy system, talking to players who have and have not found success as well as the children starting out in the system.
24	Golazzo: The Football Italia Story	Tom Boswell	31 March 2018
James Richardson looks back at the creation of Channel 4's Football Italia programme and the impact of free access to Italian football on British viewers in the 1990s.
25	John Barnes: Poetry in Motion	Luke Massey	19 May 2018
A celebration of the career of John Barnes, from his arrival from Jamaica and early success with Watford to his stardom with Liverpool and England.
26	True Grit	Daryl Goodrich	21 July 2018
Shot entirely in black and white, an insight into the trial and torment required to succeed as a speedway rider.
27	Shoulder To Shoulder	Isobel Williams	12 October 2018
Brian O'Driscoll goes on a personal journey to learn how the Ireland national rugby union team has brought together people from both sides of the sectarian divide throughout The Troubles.
28	Brothers in Football	Chris Watney	10 November 2018
Premiered on the centenary of armistice, this film tells the story of Corinthian Football Club, once one of the game's greatest teams, and how a 1914 tour of Brazil was cut short by World War I before a ball could be kicked. The modern-day amateur players of Corinthian-Casuals return to complete the visit and play their namesakes, the rich and successful SC Corinthian Paulista.
29	Too Good To Go Down	Tom Boswell	5 December 2018
John Cooper Clarke narrates the story of Manchester United's relegation from the First Division during the 1973–74 season. Based on the book of the same name by Wayne Barton.
30	Two Tribes	Andy Wells	30 March 2019
An insight into how the 1980s success of Liverpool's two biggest football clubs, Liverpool and Everton, contrasted with the post-industrial decline of the city itself under the Thatcher government.
31	State Of Play	Tom Boswell	29 May 2019
Based on the book of the same name by Michael Calvin, this follow-up to No Hunger in Paradise looks at a range of current issues in football, including mental health, homophobia and racism, the rise of women's football, head injuries and the financial state of smaller clubs.
32	The Gaffer	Ben Lowe	14 August 2019
Fly-on-the-wall documentary following five managers during the 2018–19 National League season, Harrogate Town’s Simon Weaver, Bromley's Neil Smith, John Still at Maidstone United, Eastleigh’s Ben Strevens, and Craig Hignett at Hartlepool United.
33	Team Of The Eighties	Alan Ryan	23 October 2019
Bill Nighy narrates the story of how Malcolm Allison and Terry Venables transformed the image and fortunes of Crystal Palace, leading to the prediction in 1979 that they would dominate English football in the new decade.
34	Stop the Tour	Louis Myles	28 December 2019
Trevor McDonald narrates an account of the protest movement in the late 1960s led by Peter Hain which helped to bring about the sporting boycott of South Africa during the apartheid era. Reflecting on the impact that sporting protest movements can have and the inseparability of politics and sports, the film also looks at the journey South African sport has taken from the days of apartheid to the 2019 Rugby World Cup victory.
35	Greavsie	Tom Boswell	18 February 2020
A look at the life of Tottenham Hotspur's record goalscorer and one of England's greatest strikers, Jimmy Greaves. Featuring interviews with Ian St John, Geoff Hurst and Harry Kane among others, the film tells the story of his time at Chelsea, A.C. Milan, Tottenham, West Ham and Barnet, his battles with alcoholism following retirement and his television popularity on Saint and Greavsie.
36	Proud to be Town	Tom Boswell and Isobel Williams	2 October 2020
Documentary following National League side Harrogate Town, who were on the verge of promotion to the Football League for the first time when they became the first club in England to cancel a match due to the COVID-19 pandemic. The film documents how the club and its staff coped during the UK lockdown and prepared for the National League play-offs.
37	Bosman – The Player Who Changed Football	Ben Jones	9 December 2020
David Ginola tells the story of Jean-Marc Bosman, a little-known footballer who left a permanent mark on the game with the Bosman ruling, a landmark judgment which changed the football transfer rules in Europe but, despite his victory, saw the end of his career.
38	Make It Or Die Trying – The Frank Warren Story	Daryl Goodrich	9 April 2021
39	George Best – True Genius	Tom Boswell	25 May 2021
BT Sport looks at the life and career of George Best.
40	Standing Firm: Football's Windrush Story	Theo Lee Ray	28 September 2021
41	South Of The River	Jay Gill	23 November 2021
Originally shown over 3 nights as a 3-part series
42	Glenn Hoddle – Extra Time	Mark Sharman and Isobel Williams	12 January 2021
Glenn Hoddle looks back at his career.
43	The Special 1	Isobel Williams	8 February 2022
44	M14 – A Moss Side Story	James Bentley	24 March 2022
45	The Boot Room Boys	Tom Boswell	5 April 2022
46	Super Villans	Mark Williams	13 May 2022
On the 40th anniversary of their European Cup win, BT Sport Films looks back at that historic campaign.
47	After The Roar	Theo Lee Ray, Mark Sharman, and Isobel Williams	9 September 2022
48	The Grudge	Tom Boswell	TBA
The story of the 1990 Calcutta Cup match in that year's Five Nations rugby union tournament.
49	Pound Land – The Battle for Stamford Bridge	TBA	TBA
50	Sheene	Daryl Goodrich	TBA
A look at the life and career of motor cycling legend Barry Sheene.

=== Short films ===
Four half-hour films have been made under the BT Sport Films Shorts banner. These initial four films were made using unused material from State of Play.

- State of Play: The Player
- State of Play: The Manager
- State of Play: The Club
- State of Play: Society

=== BT Sport Films Club ===
In December 2020, nine short interstitials titled BT Sport Films Club were aired, featuring presenter Craig Doyle discussing the films Brothers in Football, The Crazy Gang, Greavsie, Cornered, Rocky and Wrighty, Team of the Eighties, No Hunger in Paradise, Shoulder to Shoulder and The Gaffer, promoting the availability of the films on demand. These broadcast whenever a BT Sport channel had time in hand, for example, if live broadcasts of WWE Raw, WWE NXT or Australian A-League football had finished early. BT Sport Films Club was discontinued when BT Sport rebranded to TNT Sports in 2023.

== Critical response ==
The series has had a generally good reception from critics.

The Daily Telegraph said that Rocky & Wrighty was "a fitting tribute to the much-loved [David] Rocastle", while the same newspaper described Golazzo: The Football Italia Story as a "terrific documentary" and "well worth a watch."

Shoulder to Shoulder attracted a "phenomenal response on social media" according to the Irish Mirror, with The Irish Times calling it a "compelling documentary."

On Brothers in Football, The Sportsman said "for any devoted football fanatic this is a must-watch". The Liverpool Echo said Two Tribes was "evocative, poignant and stirring", capturing "a remarkable snapshot in time."
