= Derek Rae =

Scottish sports commentator

- Born: 9 April 1967 (age 59); Aberdeen, Scotland
- Education: Aberdeen University
- Occupation: Football commentator
- Employer(s): ESPN (United States); Deutsche Fußball Liga (Worldwide); Amazon Prime Video (United Kingdom)
- Known for: Commentator in FIFA/FC Video games series
- Spouse: Beth Powers

Derek Rae (born 9 April 1967) is a Scottish association football commentator and presenter. He currently works for ESPN and ABC in the United States for the English-language coverage of Bundesliga, DFB Pokal, and La Liga and Deutsche Fußball Liga for the English-language world feed as well as the Premier League coverage on Amazon Prime Video in the UK. He has provided the English commentary for the FIFA/EA FC video game series alongside former Arsenal players Lee Dixon in 2020, and Stewart Robson, who also played for West Ham United, since 2021. He is also an ambassador for Berwick Rangers.

== Early life and education ==
Rae grew up in Aberdeen, Scotland. During his youth, he attended football matches with a tape recorder to work on his commentary. At 15, he began his professional broadcasting career by commentating for Grampian Hospital Radio that broadcast to local Aberdeen hospitals. In 1986, BBC Radio Scotland announcer David Francey suffered a knee injury and Rae, a 19-year-old student at the University of Aberdeen who had sent the BBC a copy of his radio work, substituted for him on the commentary of a Scottish Premier Division game between Kilmarnock F.C. and Dumbarton F.C. The station was impressed and hired Rae to commentate on the Rous Cup match between rivals England and Scotland the following week. He remained with the BBC as its Scotland football correspondent, regularly commentating on Scottish Premier League and Scotland matches, a job he held for five years. Rae was the 1987 British Sports Broadcaster of the Year.

== Career ==
Rae moved to the United States in anticipation of the 1994 FIFA World Cup. FIFA hired him as a press officer and he oversaw the World Cup games that were held at Foxboro Stadium. Rae met his wife Beth Powers while working on World Cup preparations and the two would later settle in Beverly, Massachusetts.

Rae called Major League Soccer games for the New England Revolution from 1996 to 1999 and again in 2001, for the MetroStars in 2000 and the Los Angeles Galaxy in 1996.

After the World Cup, Rae joined ESPN International, where he called Eredivisie and Campeonato Brasileiro Série A games. His role later expanded to calling more than 150 games a year and hosting a weekly studio-based football discussion show, PressPass. He also writes a column called "Rae's Say" for ESPNsoccernet.

Rae is fluent in German and dabbles in several other languages. Rae has been known to call consulates to confirm that he has the correct pronunciation of a player's name.

From 2002 to 2009, he teamed up with Tommy Smyth as the lead broadcast team for the UEFA Champions League telecasts on ESPN2, including the final on-location. The duo also paired up for their coverage of UEFA Euro 2008 and 2009 FIFA Confederations Cup before they returned to provide alternate British English coverage on the Amazon Video broadcast of Thursday Night Football in the US since 2017.

In August 2009, Rae began splitting his time between the States and Scotland after being hired as lead play-by-play commentator for Scottish Premier League matches on ESPN UK.

In June 2010, he was in South Africa to commentate on 12 matches at the 2010 FIFA World Cup finals for ESPN USA partnered by Robbie Mustoe and Ally McCoist. In the summer of 2010 it was announced that Rae would be making the move back to the UK to continue commentating on a wider basis for ESPN's London-based channel.

In July 2013, Rae was confirmed as one of the lead voices on the new BT Sport channels. He commentated every week on the SPFL as well as the Europa League, Bundesliga, and Ligue 1.

Rae served as a match commentator for ESPN USA's coverage of the UEFA Euro 2012 in Poland-Ukraine, the 2014 FIFA World Cup in Brazil, and UEFA Euro 2016 in France.

In 2017 he announced that he was to leave BT Sport to return to the United States to work for ESPN. Rae also calls selected Premier League matches and has been a studio host for NBCSN. He will be calling Rugby Six nations games for them in 2018, having announced it on his Twitter feed on 29 January. In 2018, Rae became a commentator alongside Lee Dixon for FIFA 19's UEFA club tournament part of the game which can be found in Kick Off, tournaments and Career mode. This partnership continued in FIFA 20 with inclusion of him also commentating some 'default' games (kick off, tournament, career and Ultimate Team modes), as well as in FIFA 21. Since FIFA 22, Stewart Robson joined him for all broadcasts.

Rae also worked as a commentator for the 2018 FIFA World Cup and 2022 FIFA World Cup for Fox Sports in the U.S., pairing with lead women's color commentator Aly Wagner.

Rae broadcast his first MLS game for Fox on 2 March 2019 with a match between the LA Galaxy and the Chicago Fire at Dignity Health Sports Park with former MLS player Maurice Edu.

He forged an on-air partnership in France with former US women's national team defender Danielle Slaton during the 2019 FIFA Women's World Cup again on Fox Sports. They were commentators for many high-profile matches including most of the France and Netherlands matches & ending with the Netherlands-Sweden semi final on 3 July 2019.

He worked as one of the many commentators for Amazon Prime Video's UK Premier League coverage working alongside Sue Smith. In 2020, Rae was named as ESPN's lead Bundesliga commentator as well as a contributor to ESPN FC, a columnist on ESPN.com, while simultaneously doing the same for the world feed of the Bundesliga, and a commentator for the English-language La Liga coverage on ESPN/ABC in the United States.

Derek also commentated for the 2026 FIFA World Cup for Fox Sports.

== Television credits ==
- FIFA World Cup: 1998 (ABC/ESPN), 2010 (ABC/ESPN), 2014 (ABC/ESPN), 2018 (Fox Sports), 2022 (Fox Sports), 2026 (Fox Sports)
- UEFA Champions League: 2002–2009 (ESPN/ESPN2), 2013–2015 (ITV/STV), 2015–2017 (BT Sport)
- UEFA Europa League: 2009–2013 (ESPN UK), 2013–2017 (BT Sport)
- UEFA European Championship: 2008 (ABC/ESPN), 2012 (ABC/ESPN), 2016 (ABC/ESPN), 2021 (ABC/ESPN), 2024 (Fox Sports)
- Scottish Premiership: 2009–2013 (ESPN UK), 2013–2017 (BT Sport)
- Premier League: 2009–2013 (ESPN UK), 2017–2019 (NBC Sports), 2019–present (Amazon Prime Video)
- FIFA Women's World Cup: 1999 (ABC/ESPN), 2019 (Fox Sports)
- Bundesliga: 2009–2017 (ESPN UK/BT Sport), 2017–present (World Feed), 2020–2026 (ABC/ESPN), 2026-present (USA Sports)
- DFB Pokal: 2021–present (ESPN)
- FA Cup: 2009–2017 (ESPN UK/BT Sport)
- La Liga: 2002–2009, 2021–present (ABC/ESPN)
- MLS: 2019 (Fox Sports)
- New England Revolution PxP: 1996–1999, 2001
- LA Galaxy PxP: 1996
- MetroStars PxP: 2000
- Summer Olympics (Football): 2021 (NBC Sports)
