= I Believe in Miracles =

I Believe in Miracles may refer to:

- I Believe in Miracles (film), a 2015 British film
- "I Believe in Miracles", a 1973 song by The Jackson Sisters.
- "I Believe in Miracles", a song by the Ramones from the album Brain Drain.
- "I Believe in Miracles", a 1934 song by George W. Meyer and Pete Wendling
- "You Sexy Thing", a 1975 song by Hot Chocolate.
- I Believe in Miracles, a book by Kathryn Kuhlman
