= Rikers High =

- Directed by: Victor Buhler
- Produced by: Victor Buhler; Jean-Michel Dissard; Bonnie Strauss
- Starring: Andre Blandon; Millie Grant; John Hopson; Shawn Johnson; Sara McCullah; Iris Ortiz; Gustavo Rodríguez; William Santiago; Joseph Sprolling; Steven Torres
- Cinematography: Victor Buhler; Matthew Akers; Adam Feinstein; Brian Rigney Hubbard; Marlon Lawe; Rachel Morrison; Gaetan Rousseau; Tanon Sattarujawong
- Edited by: Meg Reticker; John Tintori
- Music by: Marc Anthony Thompson
- Release date: February 2005
- Running time: 90 minutes
- Countries: United States; France
- Language: English

Rikers High (also known as Lykeio Rikers) is a 2005 American and French documentary film directed by Victor Buhler. The film looks at Island Academy the high school for inmates of Rikers Island, the largest correctional facility in North America. This film has been music composed by Marc Anthony Thompson.

== Cast ==
- Andre Blandon
- Millie Grant
- John Hopson
- Shawn Johnson
- Sara McCullah
- Iris Ortiz
- Gustavo Rodríguez
- William Santiago
- Joseph Sprolling
- Steven Torres
