= A Whole Lott More =

- Film poster
- Directed by: Victor Buhler
- Release date: April 28, 2013 (Hot Docs)
- Country: United States
- Language: English

A Whole Lott More is a feature length documentary film that follows three individuals, TJ, Wanda and Kevin, who each have a different disability and very different attitudes toward work. The film surrounds Lott Industries which employs 1200 workers with disabilities. The company has successfully competed for auto industry contracts for decades but with the collapse of the local auto industry in neighboring Detroit, Lott has now struggled to keep its doors open.

Director, Victor Buhler, came to the idea of A Whole Lott More when he was in a nearly fatal car accident that left him unable to walk for 15 months. He began to research what life was like for those with developmental and physical disabilities and came across the story of Lott Industries.

The film premiered at the 2013 Hot Docs Canadian International Documentary Festival.
