= Truth vs. Beauty =

Studio album by Chocolate Genius, Inc.
- Released: October 7, 2016
- Genre: Alternative
- Length: 36:16
- Language: English, French
- Label: No Format!

Chocolate Genius, Inc. chronology
Swansongs (2010)	Truth vs. Beauty (2016)

Truth vs. Beauty is the fifth studio album by New York-based singer-songwriter Marc Anthony Thompson under the name Chocolate Genius and is his 7th studio album in all. Truth vs. Beauty was Thompson's return to music, as he had announced he was moving on from music after the release of his 4th studio album under Chocolate Genius, Swansongs, in 2010. The album was released 6 years after his intended retirement. The album came out on October 7, 2016, via the French independent record label NØ FØRMAT!

== Track listing ==
1. Detroit
2. A Brief Record of My Employment History
3. Oh, Elijah
4. How to Feel
5. Le petit artiste
6. Thinking About It
7. In Memory of Gloria Jones, Eartha Kitt, and Lena Horne
8. Swing Batta Batta
9. Dirty Man
10. He Who Smokes
11. Fortitude
12. Breakfast with the Revolutionaries
13. Hudson

== Thompson's return to music and teasers leading up to Truth vs. Beauty ==
After the 2010 release of his 4th studio album, Swansongs, Thompson announced he was moving on from music. Aside from a 2011 song collaboration with Buddy Miller ("Dang Me") and the Chocolate Genius Twitter feed, Thompson remained mostly inactive.

However, on December 16, 2015, a video was released on No Format's YouTube channel, entitled "Chocolate Genius Inc. – Epilogue 1: Truth vs. Beauty." The video simply consisted of quotes. Then, on July 4, an official teaser for Truth vs. Beauty was uploaded. Then, in September, a music video was uploaded for the song "Fortitude." The final activity before the release was one day before the album debuted when the official music video for the song "Detroit" was uploaded.

== Reception ==
Though the reviews for Truth vs. Beauty have been extremely minimal, the reviews the album has received have extremely positive. Listeners are pleasantly surprised with the music
