= Chocolate Genius, Inc. =

American musical collective

- Origin: New York City, U.S.
- Genres: Alternative R&B; neo-soul
- Years active: 1998–present
- Labels: Warner Bros. Records; Reprise Records; V2 Records; Commotion Records; One Little Indian Records; NØ FØRMAT!
- Members: Marc Anthony Thompson; Marc Ribot; Jane Scarpantoni; John Medeski; Chris Wood; Chris Whitley; Vernon Reid

Chocolate Genius, Inc. is a musical collective started by Marc Anthony Thompson, an Afro-Panamanian-songwriter based in New York City. Thompson conceived Chocolate Genius as an alter ego, which then became a music project.

== Collective members ==
- Marc Anthony Thompson — vocals
- Marc Ribot — guitar
- Jane Scarpantoni — cello
- John Medeski — keyboards
- Chris Wood — bass
- Chris Whitley — guitar
- Vernon Reid — guitar

== Albums ==
Thompson released two solo albums in 1984 and 1989. His self-titled debut album contained his only ever charting single, "So Fine". (No. 101 on the Billboard Bubbling Under the Hot 100 Singles Chart).

Chocolate Genius' first album, Black Music, on V2 Records, was released in 1998, and was considered part of the neo-soul movement. Chocolate Genius included guitarist Marc Ribot, cellist Jane Scarpantoni and other former members of the Lounge Lizards, keyboardist John Medeski and bassist Chris Wood of Medeski, Martin & Wood, guitarists Chris Whitley and Vernon Reid.

In 2001, Thompson released his next solo album, GodMusic, followed by, in 2005, a switch to Commotion Records and the release of Black Yankee Rock, produced by Craig Street. The album featured many prominent New York musicians, many of whom had appeared on his previous two records: Marc Ribot, Abe Laboriel Jr., David Stone, Glenn Patscha, Me'Shell NdegeOcello, Oren Bloedow, Yuka Honda, and Van Dyke Parks, among others.

== Scores ==
Thompson has scored film and theatre productions. He won an Obie award in sound design for A Huey P. Newton Story in 1997 and has written music for Rikers High (2005), Brother to Brother (2004), Colorvision (2004) (which he hosted in the same year), American Splendor (2003), Urbania (2000), and Twin Falls Idaho (1999). His recording of The Beatles' "Julia" was included on the soundtrack to the film I Am Sam.

In 2006, Thompson was enrolled in the line-up for the Bruce Springsteen with The Seeger Sessions Band Tour, playing acoustic guitar, providing backing vocals and sharing the lead vocals on several songs, including "Eyes on the Prize" and "When The Saints Go Marching In".

In 2010, Thompson released his fourth album, Swansongs (One Little Indian Records/No Format!), as Chocolate Genius Incorporated.

== Personal life ==
Thompson is the father of actress Tessa Thompson and singer Zsela.

== Discography ==
=== Marc Anthony Thompson ===
- Marc Anthony Thompson (1984, Warner Bros. Records)
- Watts and Paris (1989, Reprise Records)

=== Chocolate Genius ===
- Black Music (1998, V2 Records)
- GodMusic (2001, V2)
- Black Yankee Rock (2005, Commotion Records)
- Swansongs (2010, One Little Indian Records)
- Truth vs. Beauty (2016, NØ FØRMAT!)

==== Compilation/soundtrack contributions ====
- American Splendor Soundtrack ("Ain’t That Peculiar") (2003, New Line Records)
- Crossing Jordan Soundtrack ("Days") (2001, Sony)
- Rogue's Gallery: Pirate Ballads, Sea Songs, and Chanteys ("Haul Away Joe") (2006, ANTI-)
