= ESPN International =

International outlets of ESPN

- Product type: Television networks
- Current owner: ESPN, LLC
- Country: United States
- Introduced: 1983; 43 years ago
- Markets: Actual: Brazil; Canada (TSN); Caribbean; Latin America; Netherlands; Oceania; Sub-Saharan Africa; As a content hub on Disney+: Select countries in Europe and Asia-Pacific (See list); Previous: Asia; Europe (ESPN America); Indian subcontinent Israel; MENA; United Kingdom
- Previous owners: Bill Rasmussen; Capital Cities/ABC

ESPN International is a family of sportscasting and production networks around the world. It was begun in 1983, is operated by ESPN, LLC, which is jointly owned by The Walt Disney Company (which holds 72% via indirect subsidiary ABC Inc.), Hearst Communications (which holds 18%), and the National Football League (which holds 10%).

== Current operations ==
=== Canada ===
Logos of TSN (left) and RDS (right). Although these channels have kept their original brands after ESPN acquired part-ownership, they now have ESPN-style logos

ESPN International does not directly operate its own channels in Canada, but owns a 20 percent voting interest (and slightly larger equity interest) in CTV Specialty Television, a subsidiary of the Canadian media company Bell Media. Canadian regulations on the foreign ownership of broadcasters prohibit ESPN from acquiring majority interest.

Although these channels have retained their local brands (ESPN having acquired part-ownership several years after TSN and RDS launched), they adopted ESPN-style logos in 2001, and use other ESPN branding elements such as the SportsCentre title for TSN's sports highlights programs. CTV Specialty also operated a Canadian version of ESPN Classic from 2001 to 2023.

Through CTV Specialty, ESPN also has an indirect interest in the Canadian version of USA Network and several CTV-branded factual channels. These holdings, all operated in association with Warner Bros. Discovery until December 2024, date to CTV Specialty's previous incarnations as Labatt Communications and later as NetStar Communications, in which ESPN also held a minority interest. Disney/ESPN is not believed to have any direct involvement with these channels, two of which (CTV Nature Channel and CTV Wild Channel) compete directly with Disney's National Geographic brand which is separately licensed to Corus Entertainment in Canada. However, after rebranding in 2025, USA Network began airing some overflow sports programming sublicensed from TSN.

ESPN is also indirectly associated with TSN Radio, a brand used by several sports radio stations (each wholly owned by Bell Media), each of which also carries a limited amount of ESPN Radio programming.

- TSN
  - TSN2
  - TSN3
  - TSN4
  - TSN5
- RDS
  - RDS2
  - RDS Info

=== America ===
==== Spanish-speaking countries ====
- ESPN North (Mexico, Central America and Dominican Republic) (2 feeds)
- ESPN South (South America) (4 feeds)
- ESPN2 North (Mexico, Central America and Dominican Republic) (2 feeds)
- ESPN2 South (South America) (4 feeds)
- ESPN3 North (Mexico, Central America and Dominican Republic)
- ESPN3 South (South America) (2 feeds)
- ESPN4 North (Mexico, Central America and Dominican Republic) (2 feeds)
- ESPN4 South (South America)
- ESPN5 Central America (Central America and Dominican Republic)
- ESPN5 South (South America, except Argentina) (2 feeds)
- ESPN6 (Central America, Dominican Republic and South America, except Argentina)
- ESPN7 (South America, except Argentina)
- ESPN Premium (Argentina and Chile) (2 feeds)

==== Brazil ====
- ESPN
- ESPN2
- ESPN3
- ESPN4
- ESPN5
- ESPN6

==== Caribbean ====
- ESPN
- ESPN2
- ESPN Extra

=== Netherlands ===
- ESPN
- ESPN2
- ESPN3
- ESPN4
- ESPN Ultra HD

=== Oceania ===
- ESPN
- ESPN2

=== Sub-Saharan Africa ===
- ESPN
- ESPN2

=== Japan ===
- J Sports (1, 2, 3 & 4 – in joint-venture with J:COM, SKY Perfect JSAT and TBS)

== As a content hub on Disney+ ==
On April 7, 2026, the ESPN hub launched internationally on Disney+ in 57 markets, predominantly in Europe and the Asia-Pacific.

=== Availability ===
Launch rollout timeline
Release date	Country/territory
December 4, 2024	United States
April 7, 2026	Select countries in Europe and Asia Pacific
September 9, 2026	South Africa
October 7, 2026	Philippines

== Former operations ==
=== Asia-Pacific ===
In June 2012, News Corporation announced it would acquire ESPN's 50% stake in its joint venture ESPN Star Sports. Following the takeover, ESPN in Hong Kong, Taiwan and Southeast Asia was relaunched as Fox Sports in January 2013, while a version for Mainland China became Star Sports 2 in January 2014.

- ESPN Asia
- ESPN China
- Star Sports Asia
- Star Sports East Asia

=== Canada ===
- ESPN Classic (via CTV Specialty)

=== Europe ===
- ESPN America
- ESPN Classic

=== MENA and Israel ===
- ESPN
- ESPN America
- ESPN Classic

=== South Korea ===
- MBC ESPN
- SBS ESPN

=== Indian subcontinent ===
In January 2013, Star India acquired ESPN India from ESPN Star Sports, but kept ESPN brand for a while. ESPN International later established a partnership with what is now Sony Pictures Networks India in October 2015, and relaunched Sony Kix as Sony ESPN in January 2016. Sony ESPN was shut down in March 2020.

- ESPN India
- Sony ESPN
- Sony ESPN HD

=== Philippines ===
- ESPN5

=== United Kingdom ===
ESPN launched ESPN Classic in 2006. The company bought the North American Sports Network (NASN) in 2007, and renamed it ESPN America in 2009. Also in 2009, it launched the domestic network ESPN UK after securing rights to the Premier League.

In February 2013, BT Group acquired ESPN's UK and Ireland television channel and remaining broadcasting contracts. Its domestic channel was re-branded as BT Sport ESPN, integrating it with the company's BT Sport channel group. In January 2015, BT Sport and ESPN reached a seven-year agreement to continue licensing ESPN's brand for the channel, as well as British rights to ESPN original programming and events whose international rights were owned by ESPN International. The agreement also allowed for joint digital media initiatives between the two companies.

On 1 August 2022, after Warner Bros. Discovery acquired a 50% stake in BT Sport from BT Group, BT Sport ESPN was renamed BT Sport 4, and began to phase out its focus on U.S. sports, with ESPN programming ending altogether when TNT Sports replaced BT Sport in July 2023. In November 2023, ESPN announced an agreement with Sky Sports to sub-license college football and basketball coverage. with those rights then moving to streaming service DAZN in 2025.

- ESPN UK
- ESPN America
- ESPN Classic
