= TNT Sports 4 =

Sports TV channel from BT Consumer

- Country: United Kingdom
- Broadcast area: United Kingdom; Ireland
- Network: TNT Sports UK

Programming
- Picture format: 1080i HDTV (downscaled to 16:9 576i for the SDTV feed)

Ownership
- Owner: BT Group; Skydance Corporation (through TNT Sports (United Kingdom)) (a joint venture with the majority owned by BT Group)
- Sister channels: List: TNT Sports 1; TNT Sports 2; TNT Sports 3; TNT Sports 5; TNT Sports 6; TNT Sports 7; TNT Sports 8; TNT Sports 9; TNT Sports 10; TNT Sports Ultimate; TNT Sports Box Office; TNT Sports Box 2

History
- Launched: 3 August 2009; 17 years ago
- Former names: ESPN UK (2009–15); BT Sport ESPN (2015–22); BT Sport 4 (2022–23)

Links
- Website: www.wbd.com/tnt-sports

Availability

Streaming media
- BT Sport Player: Watch live (UK only)
- Virgin TV Go (formerly Virgin TV Anywhere): Watch live (UK only)
- Now: Watch live (Ireland only)

TNT Sports 4 is a British sports television channel owned by Skydance Corporation and the BT Group. It is part of the TNT Sports group of channels in the United Kingdom and Ireland.

The channel was established by ESPN Inc. on August 3, 2009, as ESPN (or ESPN UK for disambiguation), after having acquired a share of rights to English Premier League football. It served as ESPN's first UK channel devoted to domestic sport, as its pan-European sister networks ESPN Classic and ESPN America were devoted to archive content and North American sport respectively. Alongside the Premier League, the channel acquired shares of the rights to the FA Cup, Scottish Premier League, Premiership Rugby, and UEFA Europa League among other properties. The channel also carried coverage of sport from the United States (such as the NBA, NFL, NHL, and U.S. college sports, some of which carried over from ESPN America), and ESPN original programmes.

In 2012, ESPN began losing many of its signature sport properties (including the Premier League) to BT Group and its forthcoming BT Sport service. On 25 February 2013, ESPN announced that it would exit the UK and Ireland market and sell its television operations to BT Group, who integrated the channel into BT Sport upon its launch that August. The channel continued to operate under the ESPN name under licence, and was later co-branded as BT Sport ESPN. In 2015, BT Group reached a long-term deal with ESPN International to continue holding British rights to ESPN-owned sports rights and original programmes.

In August 2022, ahead of the joint venture of BT Sport with Warner Bros. Discovery, the channel dropped the ESPN branding and was rebranded as BT Sport 4, with no change in programmes. It was further rebranded as TNT Sports 4 on 18 July 2023 along with the rest of its sister channels; at this point, the channel began to be programmed with no specific scope.

== History ==
ESPN International logo.

The channel launched on 3 August 2009 following ESPN's acquisition of partial UK broadcast rights to the English Premier League (EPL) six weeks prior, caused in turn by the financial difficulties of Setanta Sports, which ceased broadcasting in Great Britain at about the same time. It marked ESPN's first foray into live coverage of domestic sports events in the UK. Prior to August 2009, ESPN's only operations in the UK were archive sports channel ESPN Classic, as well as the pan-European ESPN America channel (then known as North American Sports Network), which focused on North American sport.

On 13 June 2012, it was announced that ESPN had missed out on EPL broadcast rights from the 2013–14 to 2015–16 season to Sky Sports and BT, despite making a "strong bid". The news followed speculation that ESPN was reconsidering its position in the UK. In the following months, ESPN also lost the rights to Premiership Rugby, Premiership Rugby Sevens Series and American, Brazilian, French and Italian top-flight football to BT. On 1 February 2013, Broadcast reported that ESPN had entered talks to sell off its remaining sports rights, believed to be worth more than £15m. During The Walt Disney Company's first quarter earnings results conference call on 5 February 2013, Disney's chief financial officer Jay Rasulo confirmed that ESPN had "experienced losses" in the UK and was "exploring an exit". On 25 February 2013, BT agreed to acquire ESPN's UK and Ireland TV channels business, which were integrated into BT Sport upon its launch. The value of the deal had not been disclosed, but BT was understood to be paying "low tens of millions".

In January 2015, BT reached a long-term rights deal with ESPN, allowing the network to maintain its affiliation with ESPN International, and its rights to original programmes and sports properties owned by ESPN outright or to which it holds international rights. On 9 June 2015, BT rebranded the channel as BT Sport ESPN.

On 11 May 2022, BT Group announced that the BT Sport channels would become a joint venture with Warner Bros. Discovery (WBD), and merge with Eurosport UK at a later date. On 1 August 2022, the ESPN branding was dropped from the channel, which was renamed BT Sport 4.

The launch of TNT Sports in July 2023 saw the channel renamed as TNT Sports 4. The channel's association with American sports coverage also ended; ESPN International would begin to sublicense its college football and basketball coverage to Sky Sports in November 2023.

== Availability ==
=== Before August 2013 ===
A carriage and retail agreement for both residential and commercial customers was struck with British Sky Broadcasting, who sold the channel through their Sky platform. British Sky Broadcasting's Sky Media also acted as ad sales house for the channel. Some events were also transmitted on Sky 3D including the Winter X Games XV, 2011 FA Cup Final and 2011 NBA Finals. From 22 July 2011 ESPN was available without additional charge to full Sky Sports Pack subscribers in Ireland.

ESPN is available on Virgin Media in standard and high definition as a part of the XL pack. M, M+ or L pack customers can subscribe to ESPN and BT Sport. A discount was previously available to Sky Sports subscribers. After the acquisition of ESPN by BT Sport on 1 August 2013, Virgin Media customers lost access to ESPN channels, despite Virgin Media and BT being in talks for more than 2 months prior to the switch over. ESPN and ESPN HD returned on 15 August after BT signed a wholesale deal with Virgin Media for the carriage of BT Sport.

Top Up TV carried ESPN from 4 August 2009. A connection fee applied to non-Top Up TV subscribers, ex-Setanta digital terrestrial television customers or those without a viewing card. On 26 July 2011 Top Up TV announced that ESPN would be available via a conditional-access module (CAM) when the CAM service was launched in August.

BT Vision has carried ESPN from 4 August 2009 as part of BT Vision's Value Packs (Bronze, Silver and Gold).

On both BT Vision and Top Up TV, ESPN broadcasts from 14:00 – 04:00 on weekdays, 11:00 – 06:00 on Saturday and 11:00 – 04:00 on Sunday.

TalkTalk TV (then known as Tiscali TV) carried ESPN from 14 August 2009, along with ESPN America.

ESPN was available on Smallworld Cable without additional charge when taken with the Ultimate HD TV Pack. Other customers can subscribe to ESPN.

On 14 August 2009, a deal with cable company UPC Ireland and ESPN was reached. On that date ESPN and ESPN HD launched on UPC. A discount is available to Sky Sports or Setanta Sports 1 subscribers. ESPN America ceased to be part of the Setanta Sports package on that date, and was bundled with ESPN instead. On 4 January 2010, UPC and ESPN announced a new deal whereby ESPN (including its HD counterpart) and ESPN America would become part of UPC's Digital Select Extra and Digital Max packages.

ESPN offered a number of free periods, ranging between a weekend and a month. In February 2012 a free weekend covered a Premier League match between Manchester City and Fulham, marking the first time that a Premier League fixture had been broadcast free-to-air in the UK. During the same weekend the channel was also available on TVCatchup.

=== From August 2013 ===
After ESPN's acquisition by BT Group in 2013, BT have included ESPN as part of their BT Sport Pack and is available on Sky, Virgin Media, and BT TV, as well as online via the BT Sport website and BT Sport app. BT Sport 4 was also available in the Republic of Ireland through eir Sport.

== Content ==
This section describes the content that ESPN UK was showing when BT Sport morphed ESPN UK into a channel focused mainly on American sport.

=== Basketball ===
On 30 July 2009, ESPN announced a deal to air EuroBasket.

=== Cricket ===
On 22 July 2010, ESPN agreed a deal with the West Indies Cricket Board for exclusive UK broadcast rights to the inaugural Caribbean T20 Tournament. The event, which ran from 22 to 31 July, featured eight West Indian Twenty20 teams, including Barbados, Combined Campuses and Colleges, Guyana, Jamaica, Trinidad and Toboago and the Windward Islands competing to win the Caribbean Twenty20 title. These rights now air on BT Sport.

The channel has also completed a deal to show the inaugural Sri Lanka Premier League tournament in August 2012.

=== Football ===
==== Premier League ====
The company announced on 22 June 2009 that it had secured the UK broadcast rights to the Premier League for four seasons, airing 46 games in the 2009–10 season and 23 games a year for the following three seasons, following a missed payment by Setanta Sports which voided their contracts. In Ireland, ESPN will air the same 46 matches during the 2009–10 season.

Premier League coverage was produced by Sky Sports in-house production team, with former BBC presenter Ray Stubbs hosting, while Rebecca Lowe reports from the touchline and Jon Champion and either Chris Waddle or Craig Burley calling the game. Kevin Keegan is the lead analyst, while Guus Hiddink, Shaka Hislop, Frank Leboeuf, Danny Murphy, Peter Reid, Matt Holland, and Ian Wright were also signed to provide analysis. Mark Chapman, Nat Coombs and Kelly Cates also form a part of the line up. IMG Sports Media make the studio shows and ancillary programming. The first Premier League match to be shown on ESPN was Everton's 6–1 loss against Arsenal.

From the 2010–11 season Sky no longer produced coverage of matches, instead coverage was taken over by IMG Sports Media, in an effort to offer "quality and innovation" and introduce new technology from the broadcaster's US parent to help develop post-match analysis. The change also affected FA Cup and Scottish Premier League coverage. ESPN have also increased the number of cameras at games from an average of 16 cameras to 23. After ESPN lost the rights to the Premier League to BT Sport, ESPN Inc. sold the channel to BT Sport.

==== FA Cup ====
On 7 December 2009, it was reported that ESPN had secured the rights to 25 live and exclusive FA Cup matches per season from the 2010–11 season under a four-season deal. ESPN televised two matches in the FA Cup First and Second Rounds (plus up to two replays per round), three matches from the Third to Fifth Rounds (plus up to one replay), two quarter-finals (plus up to one replay), one semi-final, and aired the FA Cup Final alongside ITV (which held the first pick of matches).

ESPN's offer is thought to have been 60% higher than that tabled by the BBC, however, that bid is also understood to be for a longer contract period and still worth substantially less than the amount paid by Setanta.

The 2011, 2012, and 2013 FA Cup finals were shown live on ESPN. In 2012 and 2013 the buildup coverage for the finals started from eight in the morning with 5.15 evening kick-offs. An outside standing studio was set up behind the goals for pre-match and post-match analysis presented by Ray Stubbs. As ESPN was acquired by the BT Group before the start of the 2013–14 season, the final year of ESPN's FA Cup contract, coverage of the competition moved to BT Sport.

==== Women's Super League ====
As part of a four-year deal for FA Cup coverage, formally announced on 8 December 2009, ESPN has exclusive media rights for the inaugural FA Women's Super League in 2011. The channel continues to show this after the acquisition of ESPN by BT Sport.

==== Scottish leagues ====
On 16 July 2009, it was announced that ESPN had secured the broadcast rights to 30 live Scottish Premier League (SPL) games per season across the UK and Ireland, for five seasons, starting with the 2009–10 season. Sky Sports had also shown 30 live games per season during this period, including each of the Old Firm games. The SPL retained the right to opt out of the final two seasons of the deal. On 21 November 2011, ESPN's deal with the SPL was extended for five years from the 2012–13 season, however on 3 August 2012 ESPN announced a new five-year agreement allowing it to air 30 SPL games per season and 10 Rangers games from the Scottish Football League (SFL), including three home fixtures. Ray Stubbs hosts, with Derek Rae and Craig Burley commentating. Darrell Currie is touchline reporter and regular studio guests include Colin Hendry, Mark Hateley, Terry Butcher and Scott Booth.

The first SPL fixture broadcast on the channel was Dundee United's 2–0 victory over Hearts on 17 August 2009. BT Sport renegotiated the contract alongside Sky Sports to cover the newly formed Scottish Professional Football League on the BT Sport network.

==== UEFA Europa League ====
On 1 September 2009, ESPN secured a three-year TV rights deal to broadcast matches from the UEFA Europa League, previously held by Setanta Sports. At a minimum, ESPN will broadcast one match from each kick-off slot. On 17 October 2011, ESPN were also awarded part of the rights to the 2012–13 to 2014–15 seasons.

ESPN shared the rights to the Europa League with Channel 5 and ITV. As part of the deal, ESPN serve as host broadcaster for any live home matches featuring British clubs that it is transmitting and have the rights to air matches over the internet and via mobile wireless technologies.

During the inaugural season of the Europa League, ESPN broadcast live matches featuring British teams Celtic, Everton, Liverpool and Fulham, as well as 45 other European clubs, including holders Shakhtar Donetsk. ESPN were only host broadcasters for two matches, Everton's 2–1 first-leg victory over Sporting CP on 16 February and Fulham's 4–1 second-leg victory over Juventus on 18 March. When the ITV network became the primary broadcasters after Channel 5 lost the rights to the Europa League, ESPN continued to cover the Europa League. After the acquisition of ESPN by BT Sport, the coverage airs on BT Sport branded channels and from 2015 to 2016 season BT will be exclusive broadcasters of the Europa League, with highlights on ITV.

==== UEFA Champions League ====
Following BT Sport's acquisition of exclusive UEFA Champions League rights, ESPN broadcast the UEFA Champions League Goals Show, a live panel show which simulcasts all the goals and other key incidents from the matches taking place in the competition. The programme is shown during the group stage of the competition and was broadcast on ESPN for 2015–16, before moving to BT Sport 1 for 2016–17.

==== Foreign club football ====
On 28 July 2009, ESPN announced that they had secured television rights to show up to two live games per week from the Eredivisie, Portuguese Liga, up to two live games per week from the Russian Premier League and the remainder of the 2009 Major League Soccer season, including five play-off games and the MLS Cup 2009. For the 2010–11 season ESPN renewed its contracts for the Eredivisie and Russian Premier League and broadcast at least two matches each week from the Major League Soccer season, including play-off games.

ESPN signed a multi-year deal for up to five live games per week from the German Bundesliga, a selection of which is in high definition, as well as weekly preview and highlight programmes. During the 2010–11 season, ESPN also broadcast the quarter finals, semi-finals and final from the DFB-Pokal.

On 5 August 2009, ESPN announced that they had secured the rights for up to three live Serie A matches per week for the 2009–10 season as well as the Coppa Italia. ESPN also showed the 2009 Supercoppa Italiana which took place on 8 August 2009. For the 2010–11 season ESPN aires at least two games per week from Serie A, as well as a selection of Coppa Italia games. ESPN also continued to broadcast ESPN Kicks – recapping all of the weekend's goals, as well as weekly preview show, Total Italian Football.

In May 2012, ESPN acquired the rights to broadcast the Campeonato Brasileiro Série A from Brazil, followed by a deal in June to broadcast Ligue 1 from France. In July, ESPN announced a renewed multi-season Bundesliga rights deal, lasting until the 2014–15 season, for up to four matches per week (all in high definition). It will also screen action from the DFL-Supercup, as well as a highlights packages and video on-demand footage. In addition, agreements for the Eredivisie and Russian Premier League were also renewed. Foreign club football airs on BT Sport and ESPN after the acquisition of ESPN by BT Sport

==== International football ====
The first international football match shown on ESPN was the pre-season friendly match between Russia and Argentina on 12 August 2009, which saw Argentina win 3–2. The first youth international match was the European Under-21 Championship qualification match between England under-21s and FYR Macedonia under-21s on 4 September 2009, which England won 2–1.

On 5 October 2009, ESPN secured a multi-year deal to show 150 classic FIFA World Cup matches from 1930 to 2006. The matches are shown on ESPN and ESPN Classic.

As part of a four-year deal for FA Cup coverage, formally announced on 8 December 2009, ESPN will show all of the England Under-21s home fixtures. These matches have since moved to BT Sport who now own ESPN.

On 24 May 2010, ESPN announced that it had acquired UK exclusive broadcast rights to live coverage from 41 international football fixtures, including "at least" 16 qualifiers for the UEFA Euro 2012 tournament, from the Kentaro rights agency. It is understood that the batch of games will feature a broad mix of European national sides, potentially including some home nations. ESPN will also broadcast 20 international friendlies and live coverage from the Brazil World Tour, in which the five-time World Cup winners take on national teams from around the world. The first of these fixtures to be shown was the World Cup warm-up match between Argentina and Canada on 24 May 2010, which was won 5–0 by the home side, these matches moved to BT Sport after the acquisition. Sky Sports have exclusive coverage of all qualifiers within Europe from 2014 to 2018, apart from England matches and one other qualifier per matchday, which air on ITV.

On 15 July 2010, ESPN secured broadcast rights to all France and Germany's Euro 2012 qualifying matches. ESPN broadcast selected home friendly matches featuring France and Germany.

During May 2011, ESPN secured the rights to the 2011 Copa América.

==== Pre-season football ====
ESPN showed Real Madrid's 2009 tour of North America, including live matches against Toronto FC on 7 August and DC United on 9 August, Benfica versus AC Milan on 8 August and Tottenham Hotspur versus Olympiacos Volos on 9 August.

In January 2010, ESPN showed Argentine Torneos de Verano matches, including the Triangular de Verano 2010 Mar del Plata contested between Boca Juniors, Estudiantes and San Lorenzo, the Triangular de Verano 2010 Salta involving River Plate, Racing Club and Independiente as well as the Copa Revancha Mendoza between Boca Juniors and River Plate on 24 January.

Between 23 and 25 July 2010, ESPN aired all four games from the New York Football Challenge, which featured Tottenham Hotspur, Manchester City, New York Red Bulls and Sporting CP. Manchester City will then take on Club América, Borussia Dortmund, Valencia and Champions League winners Inter Milan on a ten-day tour of America between 29 July and 7 August. ESPN also aired Tottenham's match against Benfica in Lisbon on 1 August and Newcastle's friendly against Rangers in Glasgow on 7 August.

In 2011, ESPN broadcast all four games of 2011 Emirates Cup, as well as a number of other pre-season friendlies.

In 2012, ESPN will broadcast more than 20 club and international football friendlies over the summer, including the LIGA total! Cup.

==== Charity football ====
On 25 January 2010, ESPN aired the Match Against Poverty 2010, where a Benfica All-Stars XI took on a team of legends selected by Zinedine Zidane and Ronaldo, in Lisbon to benefit the United Nations Development Programme and SL Benfica Foundation.

=== Mixed martial arts ===
On 30 July 2009, ESPN announced that they had secured the rights to Ultimate Fighting Championship events from UFC 101 onwards as well as The Ultimate Fighter: Heavyweights, UFC All Access, UFC Countdown, UFC Fight Nights and UFC Unleashed.

Alongside ESPN, Channel 5 airs a one-hour highlights show called UFC: Main Event and 5USA aired the debut showing of The Ultimate Fighter: Heavyweights. However, ESPN showed The Ultimate Fighter: Heavyweights Finale live and in full. BT Sport now shows this after the acquisition, The Ultimate Fighter now airs on FX.

=== Rugby union ===
On 30 July 2009, ESPN announced that they would cover the French Top 14 live, coverage lasted until the end of the 2011–12 season. In addition, ESPN broadcast live international clashes featuring New Zealand, Samoa and South Africa. This now airs on Sky Sports.

On 14 December 2009, ESPN agreed a three-year deal for exclusive live rights to 43 matches per season from the English Premiership, beginning with the 2010–11 season, including exclusive live coverage of the English Premiership Final and one of the two semi-final matches. The agreement also provides highlight rights for use on ESPN digital media such as ESPNScrum.com. Sky Sports will continue to show 26 live games per season plus the other semi-final.

On 15 April 2010, ESPN signed Austin Healey as an expert contributor for its English Premiership presentation team, followed by Nick Mullins as chief match commentator on 27 May and Ben Kay as co-commentator on 9 June. Mark Durden-Smith will act as lead host, joined by reporter Sarra Elgan. ESPN has also confirmed plans to start providing on-site coverage for many of its English Premiership games via a custom-built set, with production from Sunset + Vine. BT Sport now show this after the acquisition of ESPN by BT Sport however most of the ESPN team work for BT Sport.

On 9 June 2010, ESPN agreed a deal with Premiership Rugby for exclusive UK broadcast rights to the J.P. Morgan Asset Management Premiership Rugby 7s Series Series. The new tournament, which took place over July and August 2010, involved all 12 Premiership Rugby clubs competing in Friday evening games. The broadcaster has also shown the 2011 and 2012 tournaments. BT Sport now shows this after the acquisition of ESPN by BT Sport.

=== Tennis ===
In March 2012. the channel showed its first tennis coverage – the Fed Cup from Madison Square Garden. During the same month, ESPN secured the rights to a series of ATP World Tour 250 events for 2012, as well as three WTA International tournaments.

=== US sports ===
ESPN also show some of the US sports available on ESPN America, including Major League Baseball, the National Hockey League, and U.S. college sports. For a period it also held the rights to the NFL's Monday Night Football, which is produced by ESPN.

In addition, the channel airs the ESPN Films' 30 for 30 series. Broadcasting of U.S. college sports, and associated ESPN produced studio programming, ended in August 2023 following the rebranding of the service as TNT Sports.

=== Other sports ===
On 30 July 2009, ESPN announced that they will cover the up to three live matches a week plus highlights from the Australian Football League including the four-week finals series culminating with the Grand Final. As part of the same announcement, it was revealed that ESPN will show Deutsche Tourenwagen Masters live. BT Sport now show this after the acquisition of ESPN by BT Sport.

ESPN screened their first live boxing event on 19 September 2009, broadcasting Friday Night Fights from America with Guillermo Rigondeaux topping the bill. On 8 December 2010, Premier Sports announced an exclusive UK deal for 31 live Friday Night Fight events from January 2011 on an initial 2-year deal. BT Sport now show this.

ESPN aired the 2009 National Rugby League first Preliminary Final live on 25 September, the second Preliminary Final on 26 September and the Grand Final live on 4 October. Premier Sport now airs this.

On 3 March 2010, ESPN agreed a deal for the UK broadcast rights to the first ever European Winter X Games. All competition finals from the Winter X Games Europe at the French ski resort of Tignes was shown live and exclusive from 10 to 12 March.

On 4 March 2010, ESPN agreed a deal for the UK broadcast rights to the 2010 World Indoor Athletic Championships held between 12 and 14 March at the ASPIRE Dome in Doha.

On 12 January 2011, ESPN and North One Sport, the promoter of the World Rally Championship (WRC), reached an agreement for the WRC to be televised exclusively on ESPN in the UK. ESPN will screen 30-minute nightly bulletins at the end of every WRC day, with on-event coverage bookended by an hour-long preview and review show. Between events, ESPN is committing 30-hour-long shows with archive material from the sport, as well as two new documentary programmes. In addition to coverage on ESPN, WRC footage will also be aired on ESPN Classic. ITV4, Motors TV and BT Sport now show this.

On 6 July 2011, it was announced that the 2011 World Masters of darts would air live and exclusively on ESPN, with the event extended to three days three-days for the first time as part of the agreement with the British Darts Organisation. This tournament now airs on British Eurosport but ESPN deal ended nine consecutive years of coverage on the BBC. In addition, ESPN agreed to share coverage of the 2012 and 2013 BDO World Darts Championship with the BBC. ESPN also broadcast the PDC 2012 European Championship in September. ESPN was the first broadcaster in Britain to show both BDO and PDC tournaments at the same time. When BT Sport acquired ESPN they dropped darts but since 2015 they have shared coverage of the BDO World Darts Championships, with the BBC in 2015 and 2016, and with Channel 4 in 2017 and 2018.

In November 2011 ESPN showed two golf tournaments from Australia.

In October 2012, ESPN announced that it will start broadcasting games from the Kontinental Hockey League, Europe's top ice hockey competition.

=== Previous ===
==== Basketball ====
===== NBA =====
On 30 September 2009, ESPN announced that they had secured a multi-year deal to show live National Basketball Association games. The channel show up to three live matches a week during the NBA season in standard and high definition, including one game at Sunday primetime. It also carries NBA All-Star Games and action from the season playoffs and final. ESPN also broadcast studio shows NBA Fastbreak and NBA Action.

Live pre-season coverage began on ESPN on 6 October 2009 when the Utah Jazz took on the Chicago Bulls as part of NBA Europe Live Tour. Coverage continued on 8 October 2009 for Utah Jazz against Euroleague Basketball's Real Madrid Baloncesto. The NBA season officially started on 27 October 2009.

ESPN UK was unable to secure the rights to the 2012–13 NBA season until 5 December 2012 when a deal was made between NBA and ESPN to show 3 games a week, NBA All Star Game, First and Second Round NBA Play-off coverage, Western Conference Finals, and NBA Finals for this season (2012–13). Coverage began the following day. The channel continues to show this after the acquisition of ESPN by BT Sport until 2017–18 season. From 2018 to 2019 season, coverage moved to Sky Sports.

===== WNBA =====
Same as the men's league games, WNBA games also moved to Sky Sports from 2018 to 2019 season.

== See also ==
- TNT Sports
- ESPN
- ESPN in the United Kingdom
