= Black Yankee Rock =

Studio album by Chocolate Genius
- Released: October 22, 2005
- Genre: R&B
- Label: Commotion Records
- Producer: Craig Street

Chocolate Genius chronology
GodMusic (1998)	Black Yankee Rock (2005)	Swansongs (Chocolate Genius Album) (2010)

Professional ratings
Review scores
Source	Rating
AllMusic	4/5 stars

Black Yankee Rock is the third album by Chocolate Genius. It was produced by Craig Street and released on Commotion Records on October 22, 2005.

The album cover is an image of a recolored battle flag.

== Track listing ==
1. "The Beginning of Always" - Thompson - 4:42
2. "Amazona" - Browne, Thompson - 4:08
3. "The Yes Eye" - Thompson 2:19
4. "Tomboyrockstar" - Patscha, Thompson - 4:57
5. "Chasing Strange" - Thompson - 3:28
6. "Down So Low" - Browne, Thompson - 3:45
7. "Rats Under Waterfalls" - Thompson - 3:33
8. "It's Going Wrong" – Moby, Thompson - 5:37
9. "Cry" – Thompson - 3:49
10. "Forever Everyone" – Thompson - 4:13
11. "Same Time Tomorrow" – Thompson - 3:14
