= Swansongs (Chocolate Genius album) =

Studio album by Chocolate Genius, Inc.
- Released: September 14, 2010
- Genre: Alternative
- Language: English
- Label: One Little Indian Records

Chocolate Genius, Inc. chronology
Black Yankee Rock (2005)	Swansongs (2010)	Truth vs. Beauty (Album) (2016)

Swansongs is the fourth studio album by New York-based singer/songwriter Chocolate Genius. Swansongs was Chocolate Genius' implied final studio album as he announced he was moving on from music after the album's release, until the 2016 release of Truth vs. Beauty, his fifth album under the name Chocolate Genius. The album was released on September 14, 2010, via One Little Indian Records and NØ FØRMAT!

== Track listing ==
1. She Smiles
2. Enough for You
3. Like a Nurse
4. Kiss Me
5. Lump
6. Polanski
7. How I Write My Songs
8. Mr. Wonderful
9. Sit & Spin
10. When I Lay You Down
11. Ready Now

== Reception ==
While the album has not received much reception as Chocolate Genius has never entered the mainstream or ever received mainstream appeal, the reviews it has received were extremely positive, receiving praise from fans and critics alike.
