= Black Music (album) =

Studio album by Chocolate Genius
- Released: July 14, 1998
- Genre: R&B
- Label: V2

Chocolate Genius chronology
Black Music (1998)	GodMusic (2001)

Black Music is the first album by Chocolate Genius. It was released on V2 Records on July 14, 1998.

Track 5, "My Mom", is about a return visit to his childhood home and the mother he was losing to senility ("My mom, my sweet mom/She don't remember my name.").

== Background and recording ==
Just prior to recording Black Music, Chocolate Genius had finished reading The Alexandria Quartet by Lawrence Durrell. In an email interview with Cleveland Scene, Chocolate Genius explained the meaning of the album's title: "As long as my skin is this color, race will be an unavoidable and hindering label for people that are stuck in that archaic mindset. Of course, I take a special pride in the achievements of people that look like me, but I am foremost a citizen of the planet. Calling the first record Black Music was my way of challenging the people who have to file, sell, and categorize music by genre."

== Critical reception ==
Professional ratings
Review scores
Source	Rating
AllMusic	4/5 stars
Pitchfork	9.0/10
Portland Press-Herald	B+
Rolling Stone	4/5 stars
Spin	8/10

Spin called it "a relentlessly somber, wryly confessional avant-folk-funk rebuttal to popular notions of what constituted African-American pop." Many other critics have also highlighted the album's morose and starkly autobiographical sound.

== Track listing ==
1. Life
2. Half A Man
3. Don't Look Down
4. Clinic
5. My Mom
6. Safe And Sound
7. A Cheap Excuse
8. Hangover Five
9. Hangover Nine
10. Stupid Again
11. It's All Good
12. Half A Man (Acoustic Version)
