= A Bit of Tom Jones? =

- Theaterical Poster
- Directed by: Peter Watkins-Hughes
- Produced by: Peter Watkins-Hughes
- Starring: Jonny Owen; Roger Evans; Eve Myles; Matt Berry
- Cinematography: Jon Rees
- Edited by: Richard Jon Micklewright
- Music by: Stuart Fox
- Production company: Tred films
- Distributed by: Tred films
- Release date: 6 November 2009
- Running time: 90 minutes
- Country: United Kingdom
- Language: English

A Bit of Tom Jones? is a 2009 Welsh comedy film written, produced and directed by Peter Watkins-Hughes. It was shot on location in Tredegar, Wales, and filmed in the summer of 2007. It was independently financed by community businesses in South Wales Valleys.

== Cast ==
- Jonny Owen
- Roger Evans (actor)
- Eve Myles
- Matt Berry
- John Henshaw
- Denise Welch
- Margaret John
- Geno Washington
- Neil Rayment
- Stephen Marzella

== Reception ==
In November 2009, the film received a theatrical run at the Vue cinema chain in Wales. So successful was this run, that Vue hosted a Leicester Square red carpet screening in London. It was released on DVD in April 2010. In May 2010 A Bit Of Tom Jones? won the Best Film award at the BAFTA Cymru event held at the Wales Millennium Centre in Cardiff.
