= GodMusic =

Album by Chocolate Genius, Inc.

Studio album by Chocolate Genius
- Released: August 7, 2001
- Genre: R&B
- Label: V2

Chocolate Genius chronology
Black Music (1998)	GodMusic (2001)	Black Yankee Rock (2005)

GodMusic is the second album by Chocolate Genius. It was released on V2 Records on August 7, 2001. The album release party and concert was held at Bowery Ballroom in New York City.

Professional ratings
Review scores
Source	Rating
AllMusic	4.5/5 stars
Entertainment Weekly	B+
Pitchfork	7.3/10
The Rolling Stone Album Guide	4/5 stars
Spin	8/10
