= Ray Stubbs =

English footballer and broadcaster (born 1956)

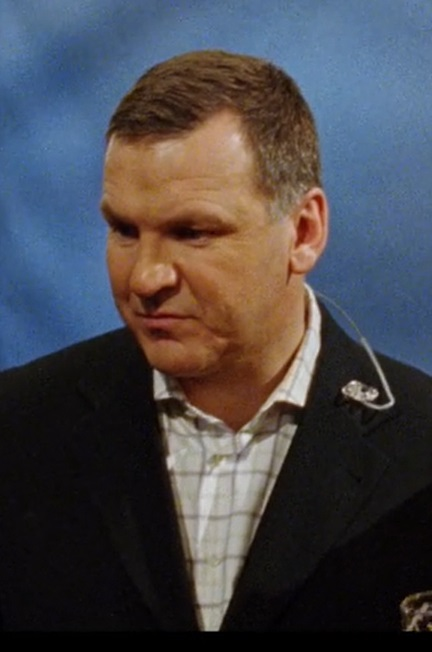
- Stubbs in Poison Arrows in 2022

Personal information
- Date of birth: 24 May 1956 (age 70)
- Place of birth: Wallasey, Cheshire, England
- Position: Left-back

Youth career
- 1973–1975: Tranmere Rovers

Senior career*
Years	Team	Apps	(Gls)
1975–1978	Tranmere Rovers	0	(0)
1978–1979	Bangor City		
1979–1980	Oswestry Town		
- * Club domestic league appearances and goals

Raymond J. Stubbs (born 24 May 1956) is an English broadcaster and former footballer. He worked as a presenter for the BBC, ESPN and BT Sport, and now works for Talksport radio.

His recent television work includes covering the World Seniors Championships for both Darts (BBC) and Snooker (Channel 5)

== Football career ==
Stubbs began his career as a professional footballer, leaving Calday Grange Grammar School to join Tranmere Rovers for five years, although he never made an appearance for the club. He also played for Bangor City between 1978 and 1980. After ending his playing career with Tranmere, he stayed with the club in an administrative capacity although he continued to play part time with Oswestry Town.

As Commercial Director of the club, he agreed a deal with club's first ever shirt sponsor; Storeton Motor Company. The deal was announced in October 1979. Two years he agreed a new shirt sponsorship with Cathedral Tours – a Liverpool-based excursion company.

He later spent three years with BBC Radio Merseyside as a reporter and presenter.

== BBC career ==
In 1986, Stubbs moved to BBC Manchester as an assistant producer, working on sports including snooker, darts and bowls, and on the quiz show A Question of Sport. He also worked as a producer, reporter and presenter on BBC Two's investigative sports series On The Line, which took him to Italy in 1990 to report on England football fans at the World Cup.

Later that year, Stubbs began working as a reporter on Grandstand, Match of the Day and Sportsnight. He reported from the Irish camp during the 1994 FIFA World Cup in America, and was the BBC's reporter-in-residence in the England camp during Euro 96 and the 1998 FIFA World Cup in France. Stubbs was a co-presenter at all the subsequent major international tournaments between 2000 and 2008 as well as the 1998 Winter Olympics and the 1998 Commonwealth Games.

Other programmes he hosted included two editions of Match of the Day Extra at the start of the 1998–99 season, a round-up of the latest sports news at the beginning of Grandstand, coverage of the live FA Cup draws and 6-0-6, the football phone-in on BBC Radio 5 Live. He also reported for BBC One's On Side as well as occasionally reporting for both Football Focus, after leaving the programme as presenter in 2004, and Match of the Day Live.

Stubbs worked for the BBC for 26 years, presenting and reporting on a number of sports, including football, darts and snooker. He fronted Football Focus from 1999 until 2004, leaving to become the presenter of Score on the BBC Red Button (formerly BBCi) as well as Final Score on BBC One. He also presented live matches for the BBC and either worked as a presenter or reporter at all 10 of the major international tournaments from 1990 until 2008.

He was a stand-in presenter on both Match of the Day (since the start of the Premier League in 1992) and Match of the Day 2 (since the show started in 2004) and became the BBC's England reporter in 2007. As well as covering football, Stubbs also fronted the BBC's darts coverage, co-hosted the BBC's snooker coverage with Hazel Irvine and presented and reported for other BBC sports programmes, such as Grandstand and Sportsnight.

== ESPN ==
In 2009, Stubbs left the BBC after more than 26 years to join ESPN. Stubbs said, "The opportunity of joining one of the world's leading sports broadcasters on day one of the new ESPN channel in the UK was just too good to turn down." During the game between Liverpool and Wolverhampton Wanderers on Boxing Day 2009, he was taken ill at half time and taken to hospital as a precaution. He presented ESPN's live coverage of the 2011, 2012, and 2013 FA Cup finals with pitchside build-up and post-match coverage.

== After ESPN ==
Following the rebranding of ESPN UK, Stubbs joined newly created BT Sport as its lead reporter. Stubbs left BT in 2016 and joined Talksport, though he is no longer working for the station and instead working for their digital only offshoot Talksport 2.

In February 2023, and again in 2024, Stubbs worked as presenter on the World Seniors Darts Championship.

== Charity work ==
Stubbs has been a big supporter of Sport Relief and often took part in physical stunts for the project. In 2002, he was dropped 100 feet from the roof of the Millennium Dome (now The O2 Arena) into a pile of boxes; in 2004, he was suspended from a crane, and swung into a giant ball of dung; and, in 2006, he was tied to a post and bombarded by 15,000 bouncy balls.

In 2007, Stubbs took part in Comic Relief does Fame Academy, and made it to the last five, before being struck down by an upper respiratory tract infection. Despite his illness, he still performed twice on the night, before being voted out by three of his fellow students so he could go home and recover. Stubbs also takes part in the Great North Run each year for charity, and is an honorary member of Gateshead Harriers.
