= ESPN Classic (UK) =

British-based European sports television channel (2002–2013)

- Country: United Kingdom
- Broadcast area: Europe

Programming
- Picture format: 16:9 (576i, SDTV)

Ownership
- Owner: ESPN Inc. (The Walt Disney Company/Hearst Communications)
- Sister channels: ESPN America; ESPN (UK)

History
- Launched: March 2002; 24 years ago
- Closed: 1 August 2013; 12 years ago
- Replaced by: BT Sport (UK)

Links
- Website: www.espnclassic.com

ESPN Classic was a British-based European sports television channel which first launched in France in March 2002, followed by Italy in July 2002, and pan-Europe in December 2003. On 13 March 2006 ESPN Classic launched on Sky channel 442 in the UK and Ireland, the first channel in the UK under the ESPN branding. On 3 August 2009, ESPN Classic launched on Virgin Media channel 533 as a part of the XL pack, and in early 2011 video on demand content started to appear on the Virgin Media platform. On 14 August 2009, ESPN Classic launched on UPC Ireland channel 409 as a part of the Max package. It broadcast a range of archive sports coverage, with a large emphasis on football.

On 25 February 2013, BT Group agreed to acquire ESPN's UK and Ireland TV channels business, consisting of ESPN and ESPN America, the value of the deal was not disclosed, but BT is understood to have paid "low tens of millions". ESPN Classic, which was not part of the BT deal, ceased transmission on satellite across Europe, the Middle East and Africa at midnight on 1 August 2013.

== Programming ==
Much of the channel's output was football. This included action from the Premier League, FA Cup matches, European Cup, European Cup Winners Cup and League Cup finals and some England games. ESPN Classic also showed games from the FIFA World Cup following a multi-year deal to show 150 classic FIFA World Cup matches from 1930 to 2006. Though most coverage on the channel was from the colour era, it had shown original black-and-white footage of European Cup finals going back as far as 1959.

A significant proportion of the football action on ESPN Classic was archive ITV football coverage, including matches covered by regional ITV companies. However much of the football seen on the channel was not shown with the original commentary. Instead, many games, especially the Premier League and FA Cup games, tended to feature commentary dubbed on more recently by Jon Champion and Paul Dempsey, or commentary by Sky Sports broadcasters such as Martin Tyler and Alan Parry which seemed to be from the international feed of the time. Similarly, the footage from games where commentary was later added did not include original on-screen captions, with ESPN adding captions themselves. Some 1960s European Cup finals also had a new commentary dubbed on by Tony Jones.

The channel also showed some rugby union international matches, including action from the Rugby World Cup, as well as past matches from the rugby union Premiership. Other sports featured included cricket, ESPN-produced vintage boxing matches, The Ultimate Fighter and more recently, action from American sports to complement the live American sports action which was broadcast on ESPN and ESPN America.

In addition to the programmes mentioned above, ESPN Classic had made a variety of other programmes. These included Sports Years as well as many football compilation programmes. In addition, to mark the 30th anniversary of ESPN, the channel showed the ESPN Films' 30 for 30 series.

ESPN Classic regularly repeated the sporting action that it showed on the channel with the same material often being shown time and time again. Some of the action, especially ESPN-produced programmes and series, had been broadcast on the channel on dozens of different occasions.

== BBC-produced programming ==
During the first three years of the channel sporting action from the BBC was featured extensively. However, this deal expired in mid 2009 and was seemingly not renewed as for the next eighteen months the channel did not feature any sport produced by the BBC. Therefore, sports such as rugby league, golf, athletics, darts and snooker were not shown on the channel nor were events such as domestic cricket prior to 1999 (the year that the BBC lost the rights to show live cricket), Wimbledon tennis, the Olympic Games and football coverage to which the BBC had the exclusive rights, which had included showings of 1970s and 1980s editions of Match of the Day under the title of "The Dead Good Match" with the opening and closing titles removed, and some editions were truncated, with only one of the matches covered in a particular programme being shown. One exception had been BBC-produced coverage of rugby union's Five Nations tournament shown during the 2011 Six Nations Championship.

In March 2011, a new deal between ESPN and the BBC was signed which provided ESPN Classic with access to around 80 hours of footage. However, this was far less than under the previous agreement which had given the channel access to around 630 hours. The new deal meant that previous ESPN-produced programmes based on the BBC archive, such as the darts series Bellies and Bullseyes, were once again shown on the channel along with new programmes, such as athletics series Solid Gold - Team GB and other one-off programmes such as a compilation of top Grand Nationals. This new deal with BBC Sport coincided with a new look for the channel, the first new look since ESPN UK launched in summer 2009.

== Live action ==
ESPN Classic occasionally showed live action when two events to which ESPN has the rights took place at the same time. The first live sport that the channel showed was two UEFA Europa League matches, on 29 September and 20 October 2011. The first of the two games was Maribor and Birmingham.

On 9 January 2012, the channel broadcast the third evening of the BDO World Darts Championship because the main channel was showing a third round match from the FA Cup. This happened again a year later when for the same reason ESPN Classic again showed the third evening's action.

On 5 May 2012, ESPN Classic broadcast two live events - the final day of rugby union's Premiership league season and a football match from Serie A. This was due to the main channel showing live coverage of the FA Cup Final.

On 1 September 2012, ESPN Classic showed a live rugby union match from the Aviva Premiership because the main network was broadcasting its weekly match from football's Premier League. The same happened two weeks later although the clash this time was due to the main channel showing the Scottish Premier League.

On 20 and 22 September 2012, ESPN Classic showed live coverage of the European Darts Championship because the main channel was showing the UEFA Europa League and the Aviva Premiership respectively. The following day (Sunday 23rd) ESPN swapped its coverage with the darts being shown on the main channel with much of its traditional Sunday fare of European league football plus another Aviva Premiership match airing on Classic.

On 4 May 2013, ESPN Classic was used to provide coverage of a second game from the final set of league matches of the 2012–13 Aviva Premiership season.

== See also ==
- ESPN
- BT Sport ESPN
- ESPN Star Sports
- ESPN America
- ESPN in the United Kingdom
- ABC1
- ESPN on ABC
