= Victor Buhler =

American television and film director

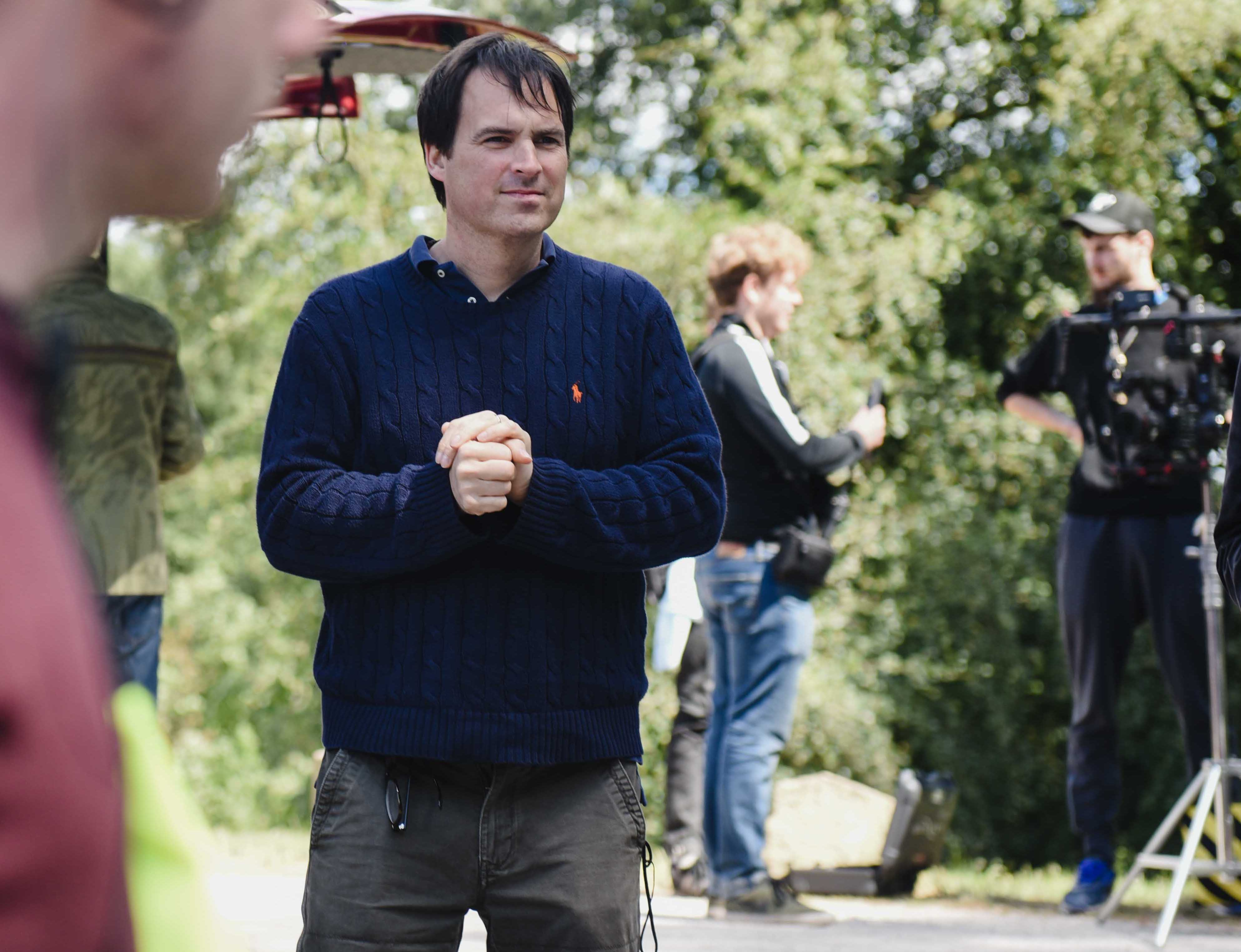
Victor Buhler on the set of his feature film Running Naked.

Victor Buhler (born February 1, 1972) is an American television and film maker. He began his career as a director but more recently he has become an executive producer for high-profile documentary series such as ESPN's 'In The Arena: Serena Williams' and Netflix's upcoming 'Aaron Rodgers: Enigma'. He currently works as SVP of Development and Production for Tom Brady's company Religion of Sports, where he oversees dozens of television series per year.

== Directing Work ==
Buhler directed the documentary feature film Rikers High, about the school for teenage inmates in Rikers Island jail. It won the Award for Best Documentary at the 2006 Tribeca Film Festival. He also directed The Beautiful Game, a Netflix documentary feature film about the 2010 soccer World Cup that debuted at the Seattle International Film Festival. Buhler also directed A Whole Lott More about employment for people with developmental disabilities. It was voted an audience favorite at the 2013 HotDocs Documentary Festival. He also co-wrote and directed the scripted feature Running Naked which won Best Film at the 2020 Beijing Film Festival. Buhler’s many directing television credits include Sirens and Drugs Inc. His short film Chaperone was nominated for a student Academy Award.

== Producing Work ==
Buhler has produced dozens of high-profile documentaries including HBO's hit series The Vow and, in 2019, he won a Sports Emmy for producing Tom vs. Time. Other highlights include credits on Showtime's 'Shut Up And Dribble', Netflix 'Simone Rising', Hulu's 'Thank You, Goodnight: The Bon Jovi Story' and Participant Films' Countdown to Zero'.

== Academic Background ==
Buhler has taught filmmaking at Harvard University and at New York University's Tisch Graduate Film Program
