= ESPN in the United Kingdom =

ESPN logo

Between 2006 and 2022 ESPN operated several sports television channels in the United Kingdom and Ireland.

== Channels ==
ESPN Classic launched on 13 March 2006 on Sky channel 442, the first channel in the UK under the ESPN branding. Initially it was only available on Sky Digital but the channel became available on Virgin Media and UPC Ireland in August 2009 when ESPN UK launched. It broadcast a range of archive sports coverage but with an emphasis on football. The channel closed at midnight on 1 August 2013.

Programming was available in only standard-definition format.

ESPN America was a British-based European sports network, focusing on professional and collegiate sports of the United States and Canada. Originally launched in December 2002 as NASN (the North American Sports Network), ESPN purchased the channel in March 2007 for €70m from Benchmark Capital Europe and Setanta Sports. The channel was known as ESPN America from 1 February 2009. ESPN America broadcast a selection of top North American professional and collegiate sports leagues. The network closed at midnight on 1 August 2013.

Programming was available in standard-definition and high-definition formats.

ESPN launched on in the UK on 3 August 2009. The channel marked ESPN's first foray into live coverage of domestic sports events in the UK. When ESPN lost the rights to the Premier League to BT, BT completed their purchase of ESPN's UK and Ireland TV channels business on 31 July 2013, but continued to operate ESPN, with programming largely resembling that of ESPN America.

In January 2015, BT reached a long-term rights deal with ESPN, allowing the network to maintain its affiliation with ESPN International, and its rights to original programmes and sports properties owned by ESPN outright or to which it holds international rights. This saw BT rebrand the channel as BT Sport ESPN on 8 June 2015. This continued until August 2022, when BT Sport ESPN was renamed BT Sport 4.

Programming was available in standard-definition and high-definition formats.

ESPN Player, previously branded ESPN360, was ESPN’s digital streaming platform in the UK and Europe for live and on-demand sports. The service was available across Europe, Middle East & Africa and, predominantly, broadcast U.S sports content. Main content included NCAA Football, NCAA Basketball, College Sports, IndyCar Series, World Series of Poker, X Games and others. The platform was a direct to consumer service, as Pay Per View, and not linked to any TV subscription. ESPN Player closed on August 18th, 2023 with all content sold to TV broadcasters or no longer available for customers in Europe.

== Mobile ==
On 6 April 2010, ESPN secured mobile rights to highlights from all Premier League games from the 2010-11 season, after beating British Sky Broadcasting to the deal. The broadcaster won a three-year deal for short-form mobile highlights from all 380 Premier League games. It is thought that ESPN paid under £10m for the rights in a blind auction.

The application, titled ESPN Goals, features a basic service offering news and live scores, which is free-to-download. However, the full video clips package are chargeable on a monthly or season basis. The clips can be issued during any matches not kicking off at 3pm on Saturdays, with highlights from those games only being permitted for release after 4.45pm.

UK users are able to access the application from the Android Market, Apple App Store, BlackBerry App World, Ovi Store and Windows Phone Marketplace, along with ESPN's mobile site.

From the 2011–12 Premier League season, the app became completely free both to download and to view clips, instead relying on advertising revenue to fund the service.

From the 2013–14 Premier League season, the rights to mobile highlights have been sold to News UK, ESPN is not thought to have submitted a bid.

== Post-closure of main ESPN UK channel ==
On 25 February 2013, BT agreed to acquire ESPN's UK and Ireland TV channels business and part of the agreement saw one of BT Sport's channels retaining the ESPN name. The value of the deal was not disclosed, but BT is understood to have paid "low tens of millions". However, ESPN Classic, which was not part of the BT deal, and ESPN America ceased transmission across Europe, the Middle East and Africa at midnight on 1 August 2013.

In 2015, BT Group reached a long-term deal with ESPN International to continue holding British rights to ESPN-owned sports rights and original programmes. This resulted in many of ESPN's signature sports shows, such as College GameDay and Baseball Tonight, being shown on BT Sport ESPN.

In August 2022, after Warner Bros. Discovery EMEA acquired a 50% stake in BT Sport, the channel dropped the ESPN branding and was renamed BT Sport 4. However ESPN programming continued at the same level of coverage until the following July when TNT Sports replaced BT Sport. ESPN programming stopped being broadcast in the UK at this point until, in November 2023, ESPN sub-licensed college sports coverage to the network's main rival, Sky Sports although the level of ESPN programming on Sky was much lower than it was during the BT Sport era with only three games per week of each sport aired during the regular season although full post-season coverage, including all Bowl games and full coverage of March Madness was aired on Sky. The only non-match ESPN programming was College GameDay (football TV program) and Half Time Report during football games. No associated ESPN basketball-related programming is shown on Sky, with the half time period filled by a non-College Basketball insert.

A few days before the start of the 2025/26 season, streaming service DAZN announced that it has signed a multi-year deal with ESPN to show to show games broadcast by ESPN (and ABC). Games shown by other broadcasters, such as Fox and CBS, are not shown, although Sky Sports continues to show Notre Dame home games live on Sky Sports NFL due to Notre Dame's home games being shown on NBC. The deal with DAZN sees many more games being covered, with up to 20 or more games per week potentially being shown. So far, the only associated programming is College GameDay (football TV program) and Half Time Report.

== See also ==
- ESPN
- TNT Sports 4
- ESPN America
- ESPN Classic (UK)
- ESPN International
