= Don't Take Me Home =

- Film Poster
- Directed by: Jonny Owen
- Starring: Gareth Bale; Chris Coleman; Aaron Ramsey; Gary Speed; Ashley Williams
- Edited by: Owen Davies
- Music by: Ian Neil (music supervisor)
- Production companies: Spool Films; BT Sport Films
- Release date: 1 March 2017 (UK)
- Running time: 86 minutes
- Country: United Kingdom
- Language: English

Don't Take Me Home is a 2017 Welsh documentary film, directed by Jonny Owen.

== Synopsis ==
The film recounts the saga of Wales national football team to qualify for their first major tournament in 58 years, the UEFA Euro 2016. To get there they had to overcome huge obstacles including the suicide of their young and talented coach, Gary Speed.

== Cast ==
- Gareth Bale as Himself
- Chris Coleman as Himself
- Aaron Ramsey as Himself
- Gary Speed as Himself (archive footage)
- Ashley Williams as Himself

== Reception ==
The Guardian's film critic Gwilym Mumford, gave the film three out of five stars, stating: "At a time when Senna and OJ: Made in America are twisting the sports documentary into exciting new shapes, this is a fairly workaday affair, but in its brisk, cheerful telling it does a solid job of evoking the thrill of the Dragons’ unlikely run." Stephen Carty from Radio Times gave it four out of five stars and wrote: "The team's remarkable journey is detailed in this enjoyable documentary, which captures the passion and spirit that the players demonstrated during the competition. As you might expect, it features footage from each of their matches, as well as reflective interviews with the players and the team's manager, Chris Coleman. These exchanges aren't particularly revealing (football interviews rarely are), but the team's story is inspiring, uplifting and infectious. Happily, the same can be said about the film." Greg Cochrane writing for NME gave Don't Take Me Home four out of five stars. Kate Muir from The Times disliked the film. She gave it only one out of five stars and wrote: "The publicity describes it as “the incredible true story of the Wales football team’s 2016 Euros success”, but Don't Take Me Home is more a compilation of interviews and match footage than a cinema documentary, and some of it is shot on wobbly upright iPhone. Fans of the Welsh underdogs that made good will enjoy reliving memories and Gareth Bale's goals, but there is little here for the general viewer."
