= Jonny Owen =

Welsh actor, producer (born 1971)

- Born: Jonathan Tudor Owen; 4 July 1971 (age 55); Merthyr Tydfil, Wales
- Other names: Jonathan Lewis Owen; Lewis Owen
- Occupations: Actor; producer; voice over artist; comedian; musician; songwriter
- Years active: 1991–2001 (as musician); 2001–present (as actor)
- Spouse: Vicky McClure (m. 2023)
- Children: 1

Jonathan Tudor Owen (born 4 July 1971 in Merthyr Tydfil, Mid Glamorgan) is a Welsh producer, actor and writer who has appeared in TV shows including Shameless, Murphy's Law and My Family. Owen won a Welsh BAFTA in 2007 for the documentary The Aberfan Disaster, which he co-produced with Judith Davies.

== Career ==
In his later teens he was in the 1990s indie band The Pocket Devils as bass player and lead singer/songwriter. Signed to Sanctuary Records in the UK and Pop Music Records in the US, they split after Sanctuary Records and The Pocket Devils came to a mutual termination.

Owen landed the part of Richey in the Welsh drama series Nuts and Bolts in 1999. From Nuts and Bolts he landed parts in UK Network series including Murphy's Law and Dirty Work.

A year later, he began hosting HTV Wales' 'Soccer Sunday' with his first appearance at Sam Hammam's first home match as then owner of Cardiff City as they drew 1-1 against Blackpool in August 2000.

His meeting with Irvine Welsh when filming the Gene video "Is it over?" led to Owen working with Welsh (and his writing partner Dean Cavanagh) on several dramas including Dose for the BBC, Wedding Belles for C4 and Good Arrows for ITV (which Owen also produced).

His 2006 film Little White Lies won several film festival awards and was featured at the Moscow Film Festival. He played a BNP thug. In 2007 he appeared as Banana Boat in Torchwood.

Owen has also worked extensively as a writer and producer for ITV Wales, including winning the Gwyn Alf Williams Award at the Welsh BAFTAs for the 40th anniversary documentary of the Aberfan disaster. It was revealed during shooting that Owen's father had been one of the first Welsh miners on the scene in the recovery operation.

Owen also did a piece for Cardiff City F.C.'s appearance in the FA Cup final for Match of the Day in 2008. It received positive reviews in the media, including The Guardian calling it the best part of the day's coverage apart from the football.

In 2009 Owen appeared as regular character Ady in Channel 4's Shameless, and continued in the role in 2010.

2009 also saw the release of the independent film A Bit of Tom Jones?, with Owen in the lead role. The film spread from a limited release in Wales to being shown in selected markets throughout the UK by Vue.

He is the writer and creator of Svengali, a cult internet series which the Evening Standard and NME called 'the best series on the net'. The series, in which he plays the manager of an up-and-coming band, is based on his experiences in the music industry; he named one character 'Choop' after the manager of his own band. Former Creation Records head Alan McGee plays the Svengali whom character 'Dixie' pursues in an effort to get the band he manages signed. The work was adapted into the 2013 feature film Svengali, the debut release from Root Films. It was selected to show at the 67th Edinburgh International Film Festival, and was also nominated for the Michael Powell Award, a prize which honours the best British feature film.

Owen has written for The Guardian, Telegraph, Metro and Western Mail. He also was the voice for ITV Wales's Soccer Sunday programme from 2002 to 2008 and did weekly reports from France for ITV during the 2007 Rugby World Cup.

In 2014 he played in the series Glue on E4.

On 10 March 2018, Owen was appointed as a director at Nottingham Forest F.C. to control the club's media output and video production, having previously directed the 2015 film I Believe In Miracles chronicling Forest's glory years under Brian Clough in the 1970s and 80s.

== Personal life ==
When Owen was a teenager, he was a Welsh Boys Club Boxing champion.

Owen and his wife, actress Vicky McClure, live in Nottingham, where they relocated to live nearer her family. As of 2017 they were engaged. On 11 August 2023, they married in Nottingham.

He is a director of Nottingham Forest Football Club and investor in Merthyr Town F.C., the town in which he was born.

He has one child from his first marriage.

== Filmography ==
TV

- Glue
- Shameless
- Svengali
- This Is England '90
- Torchwood
- Wedding Belles
- Murphy's Law
- Dose
- A Mind to Kill
- Nuts and Bolts
- Soccer Sunday, ITV Wales, 2004–2008
- Soccer Special, ITV Wales, 2004–2008
- Icons of Football 2:2 John Robertson, BBC Scotland 2024
- Top Sport, ITV Wales, 2004–2006
- Hot Pursuit, ITV Wales, 2002
- Rugby World Cup Special, ITV Wales, 2003
- Rugby World Cup Special, ITV Wales, 2007
- Cancer Awareness, BBC Wales, 2003

Film

- One of the Crowd
- A Bit of Tom Jones?
- Cow
- Good Arrows
- Little White Lies
- Decidedly Bloody Dodgy
- Svengali (2013)
- I Believe in Miracles (film) (director)
- Don't Take Me Home (2017)
- The Three Kings (2020)

Voice

- FA Cup Final Match of the Day, BBC Sport, 2008
- Wales the Week promos, ITV Sport, 2008
- Hospital 24/7, BBC Wales, 2008
- Aberystwyth Soccer Seven's, Sky Sports, 2005

Producer

- Svengali
- Good Arrows
- Aberfan, ITV Wales/Sky News, 2006
- The Last Miner, The Tower Colliery Story, ITV Wales, 2007
- Soccer Sunday, ITV Wales, 2004–2008
- The Story of the NHS, ITV Wales, 2008

Others

- Keane – video for the single "Atlantic", 2006
