= ESPN America =

- Broadcast area: Europe

Programming
- Picture format: 576i (16:9 SDTV); 1080i (HDTV)

Ownership
- Owner: ESPN Inc.
- Sister channels: ESPN; ESPN Classic

History
- Launched: 5 December 2002; 23 years ago
- Closed: 1 August 2013; 13 years ago
- Former names: NASN (2002–2009)

Links
- Website: www.espnamerica.com

ESPN America was a British-based European sports network, focusing on professional and collegiate sports of the United States and Canada. Originally launched on 5 December 2002 as NASN (the North American Sports Network), ESPN America broadcast a selection of top North American professional and collegiate sports leagues including Major League Baseball (MLB), National Basketball Association (NBA), National Collegiate Athletic Association (NCAA) and Canadian Football League (CFL), 24 hours a day on digital cable and digital satellite television.

Formerly operated by Setanta Sports with backing from Benchmark Capital Europe, it was acquired by the American sports media company ESPN in March 2007. It was subsequently re-branded as ESPN America on 1 February 2009 before closing on 1 August 2013.

== Programming ==
Programming on ESPN America varied from country to country. The channel operated three feeds throughout Europe, the Middle East and North Africa. In the United Kingdom, Ireland, and the Nordic countries events shown on ESPN America included Major League Baseball, the College World Series, NCAA college football and college basketball, the NCAA Men's Ice Hockey Championship Frozen Four plus the Arena Football League, Major League Lacrosse, and the NCAA Men's Lacrosse Championship Final Four. In continental Europe, the Middle East, North Africa and Iceland the broadcast also included NFL programmes.

ESPN America also showed the Little-League World Series from Williamsport, PA and the Nathan's Hot Dog Eating Contest from Coney Island in Brooklyn, NY.

NASN paid £11.6m in March 2006 for the rights to show ten live MLB games a week.

In 2006, ESPN programmes, including Baseball Tonight, Around the Horn, The Sports Reporters and Pardon the Interruption were dropped from the schedule as the contract between NASN and ESPN ended. However, they returned from 1 April 2007 after ESPN acquired the channel.

ESPN America also aired other ESPN US produced single-sport programmes, such as College Football Live, College GameDay, NBA Fastbreak and NASCAR Now. In addition, to mark the 30th anniversary of ESPN, the channel has been showing ESPN Films' 30 for 30 series.

On 28 October 2009, ESPN America began to be broadcast in 16:9 widescreen.

On 1 March 2010, ESPN America began showing a European edition of SportsCenter, anchored by Michael Kim. The 30-minute programme broadcast five days a week at 6am UK/7am CET with three repeat showings following immediately after, with an updated show at 10.30pm UK/11.30pm CET. The show was filmed at ESPN’s headquarters in Bristol, Connecticut, USA.

One initative used to diversify ESPN'S offering of sports news and highlights globally was the creation of SportsCenter for Europe. This show was created at ESPN'S headquarters in Connecticut and broadcast to households in the United Kingdom, Ireland and Europe and the Middle East. This show was one of the many that allowed ESPN to offer its viewers sports news globally.

Up until the 2011–12 NHL season, ESPN America held the rights to live and delayed NHL matches as well as round-up programming such as NHL On The Fly, however these rights were not renewed for the UK, Ireland & the Nordic countries and are now held by different networks across Europe. However, they still hold the rights for other countries throughout continental Europe, such as Germany. ESPN America acquired the American Hockey League, a minor North American Hockey League broadcast rights as a replacement for the UK, Ireland and the Nordic countries.

In April 2012, SportsCenter moved from five to seven days a week with a new start time of 8am UK/9am CET. At this point, ESPN stopped producing a local version of SportsCenter, opting instead to broadcast an edited version of the 2am ET show from Los Angeles, cut to fit 45 minutes through removing commercial breaks and stories on European sports such as soccer. This show is then repeated at 8.45am, 4pm & 4.45pm (UK time).

== Sale to ESPN ==
Former NASN logo used up to 1 February 2009.

In late 2006, former owners Benchmark Capital Europe and Setanta Sports agreed to sell the network to ESPN for €70m. The sale was completed in March 2007 but the network continued to be part of the Setanta Sports Pack on satellite television until June 2009 when Setanta UK went into administration. The network became known as ESPN America on 1 February 2009 to coincide with Super Bowl XLIII. The channel continued to provide the same lineup of North American sports programming.

ESPN America HD logo

On 1 March 2010, the Nordic Canal Digital launched an HD version of ESPN America. The channel launched in the UK on the Sky platform on 21 June 2010. It was launched in Portugal on ZON Multimédia's cable platform on 24 November 2010 and later on MEO (Portugal)'s cable platform on 15 July 2011. In Germany, the Channel started airing over the Sky Germany platform on 27 October 2010. In Italy, the HD channel was launched on 1 February 2012.

== Sale to BT Group and subsequent closure ==
On 25 February 2013, BT Group agreed to acquire ESPN's UK and Ireland TV channels business, consisting of ESPN and ESPN America, the value of the deal was not disclosed, but BT is understood to have paid "low tens of millions". At midnight on 1 August 2013 the channel ceased all operations.

Additionally, as part of the deal between ESPN and the BT Group, Americans were still able to watch ESPN on television for many different sports like NASCAR, college basketball, and college football. This deal was supposed to be finanlized on July 31, 2013. But also in part of this deal BT stated that they would keep at least one channel named ESPN as part of their newly created channel. Now because of this purchase ESPN programming outside of Ireland and the United Kingdom would not be offered.

In the UK and Ireland most contents were moved to the local version of ESPN (later BT Sport ESPN; now known as TNT Sports 4), whereas the non-North American content was added to the newly launched BT Sport. Meanwhile, in Germany rights were sold to new channel Sport 1 US. Digital live and on-demand coverage of the majority of content from ESPN America is available on ESPN Player.

== See also ==
- Eurosport
- ESPN (UK)
- ESPN Classic (UK)
- ESPN Classic (Italy)
- ESPN in the United Kingdom
- Setanta Sports
