= The Beautiful Game (2012 film) =

2012 documentary film

The Beautiful Game is a 2012 feature documentary exploring the power of soccer in modern Africa and how it is changing the lives of individuals and communities there. The film, directed by Victor Buhler, features notable participants such as Kofi Annan, Archbishop Desmond Tutu, F. W. de Klerk, Roger Milla, John Obi Mikel, Sulley Muntari, Ema Boateng, José Mourinho, Kolo and Yaya Touré.

The Beautiful Game has had numerous screenings across the world, played on The Sundance Channel and was featured on Netflix. The film drives the message that soccer is more than just a game.
