= I Believe in Miracles (film) =

- Theatrical release poster
- Directed by: Jonny Owen
- Production companies: Baby Cow Productions; Spool Films; BT Sport Films
- Distributed by: Universal Pictures International Entertainment; National Amusements
- Release date: 13 October 2015
- Running time: 104 minutes
- Country: United Kingdom
- Language: English
- Budget: £500,000
- Box office: US$239,770

I Believe in Miracles is a 2015 film directed by Jonny Owen.

== Plot ==
The film tells the story of football club Nottingham Forest's rise, under Brian Clough and Peter Taylor, to becoming English champions in 1978 and European champions in 1979 and 1980. The film features documentary footage of matches and interviews with many of the former Forest players who played at the time.

The film's soundtrack includes funk and soul music from the 1970s, including the song from which its title is based, featuring versions from The Jackson Sisters and Mark Capanni.

A book of the same name to accompany the release of the film was written by Daniel Taylor, chief football writer of The Guardian.
