= Soccer on ESPN/ABC =

Live sports television program

- Genre: Soccer telecasts
- Theme music composer: Lisle Moore
- Country of origin: United States
- Original languages: English, Spanish

Production
- Camera setup: Multi-camera
- Running time: 2+ hours (or until game ends)
- Production company: ESPN

Original release
- Network: ABC; ESPN; ESPN2; ESPN3; ESPN+ ESPNEWS; ESPNU; ESPN Deportes

Soccer on ESPN and ABC is a number of programs that currently airs soccer matches in the United States. These matches are from European competitions.

== Current programming ==
=== United States ===
==== USL ====
ESPN airs all matches from the USL on ESPN+ with select matches on ESPNews or ESPNU. The games are produced by the USL, and commentary is provided by Mike Watts and Devon Kerr.

==== College Soccer ====
ESPN regularly airs college soccer on ESPNU, SEC Network, ACC Network, and Longhorn Network. Jenn Hildreth is the lead commentator for women's soccer coverage. College soccer is also available on ESPN+ via school productions.

=== England ===
==== FA Cup ====
ESPN airs all matches from the FA Cup on paid streaming service ESPN+, with no games on linear television, including Community Shield (before the cup season stars). This broadcast started in 2018 when Fox Sports coverage of the tournament expired. Martin Tyler and Stewart Robson are the lead the broadcast team for World feed broadcasts while Jon Champion and Danny Higginbotham are the lead the broadcast team for non-World feed broadcasts. Dan Thomas and Kay Murray present prematch coverage from the ESPN FC studios. In 2020, Dan Thomas hosted coverage of the final with Craig Burley, Don Hutchison, Shaka Hislop, and reporter Alexis Nunes. The final was commentated by Martin Tyler and Stewart Robson. For other rounds, ESPN airs a digital prematch show hosted by Kay Murray or Mark Donaldson alongside ESPN FC pundits.

During 2022–23 Fourth qualifying round, ESPN produced live coverage of Wrexham's FA Cup matches against Blyth Spartans with full studio build up hosted by Angus Scott and Kelly Somers alongside pundits Hal Robson-Kanu, Steve Watson, and Robert Earnshaw with commentary provided by Guy Mowbray and Alan Smith.

=== Germany ===
==== Bundesliga ====
ESPN won the rights to the Bundesliga again starting with the 2020–21 season, as well as Supercup (before the league season starts). All matches will air on ESPN+ with at least four matches per year airing on the linear TV channels. The last time ESPN previously aired the league was in 2011–12. Linear TV matches are preceded by a 30-minute pregame show as well as a digital prematch show with postmatch coverage on ESPN+. Derek Rae and Stewart Robson are the lead broadcast team since 2021–22. Also, Mark Donaldson, Ross Dyer, Jonathan Yardley, Steve Cangialosi, Jon Champion and Rob Palmer are one other play-by-play announcers while Lutz Pfannenstiel, Kasey Keller, Janusz Michallik, and Alejandro Moreno are working as other color commentators. while the ESPN+ matches are commentated by world feed. Studio coverage is hosted by Kay Murray on TV or Dan Thomas on digital alongside Craig Burley, Jan Åge Fjørtoft, Keller, Jürgen Klinsmann, Steve Cherundolo, and reporter Archie Rhind-Tutt. The Bundesliga on ABC debuted in 2021 with Bayern vs. BVB. Rae and Taylor Twellman called the match while Kay Murray hosted in the studio with analysts Twellman and Klinsmann.

ESPN also broadcasts the second-tier competition, the 2. Bundesliga. Every week, at least one match is broadcast on ESPN+, with Ross Dyer or Jonathan Yardley calling the action.

==== DFB-Pokal ====
ESPN also air the German domestic cup, the DFB Pokal. Early round matches usually air on ESPN+ and commentated by world feed. From the quarterfinals onward, matches is airing on linear ESPN networks with commentary provided by Derek Rae, Ross Dyer, Steve Cangialosi, or Jon Champion alongside Taylor Twellman, Kasey Keller, Stewart Robson, or Lutz Pfannenstiel.

=== Netherlands ===
==== Eredivisie ====
In 2018, ESPN has reached a multi-year media agreement for airing Dutch Eredivisie. Every week, ESPN+ airing four matches in English and some matches are available in Spanish.

=== Spain ===
==== La Liga ====
ESPN, ESPN2, ABC, and ESPN+ acquired the rights to La Liga in 2021. English-language coverage is led by Dan Thomas and Kay Murray, who will be sharing hosting duties. Ian Darke and Steve McManaman serve as the lead broadcast team. Other play-by-play men are Derek Rae, Adrian Healey, Rob Palmer, Sebastian Salazar, Mark Donaldson, Steve Cangialosi, Ross Dyer, Jon Champion, Richard Kaufman, Kevin Keatings, Jon Driscoll, Daniel Mann and Jonathan Yardley while other analysts include Luis García, Pablo Zabaleta, Kasey Keller, Alejandro Moreno, Stewart Robson, Alex Pareja, Diego Forlán, Janusz Michallik, Efan Ekoku, Craig Burley and Mario Suarez. Garcia and Zabaleta also contribute as studio analysts. World feed commentator also to be used for several games on ESPN+. For the La Liga on ABC or big matches like the El Clásico, Dan Thomas hosts the prematch on site alongside Luis García and Pablo Zabaleta. All matches are on ESPN Deportes.

Adal Franco, Cristina Alexander, and Ricardo Puig led Spanish-language coverage. Play-by-play is provided by Fernando Palomo, Jorge Ramos, Ricardo Ortiz, Richard Mendez, and Mauricio Pedroza alongside Diego Forlán, Mario Kempes, Hugo Sánchez, Andrés Agulla, Carolina De Las Salas, Alex Pareja, and Hernán Pereyra. Reporters for both languages include Martin Ainstein, Rodrigo Faez, Moises Llorens, Sid Lowe, Manu Martín, Gemma Soler, and London-based football reporter Alexis Nunes.

==== RFEF ====
ESPN, ESPN2, ABC, and ESPN+ are airing both Copa del Rey and Supercopa de España tournaments through 2027.

=== Other soccer rights acquired by ESPN ===
- Belgian First Division A

== Former programming ==
=== FIFA World Cup ===
ESPN held the rights to the FIFA World Cup in 1986 and between 1994 and 2014 until Fox Sports picked up the rights for 2018 onward. Matches were aired on ESPN, ESPN2, and ABC. ABC aired the final.

=== North American Soccer League ===
In the last few years of its existence, the NASL did manage to get some games on a new cable sports network that had begun in 1979 called ESPN. In 1981, they signed a contract to broadcast 20 games on Saturdays. The new USA Network also carried games, usually on Wednesday nights.

=== Major Indoor Soccer League ===
The MISL landed a steady national TV contract for the first time since 1983 when they were on USA, as ESPN would televise 15 regular-season games on Sunday afternoons, the All-Star Game and assorted playoff games. beginning in the 1985–86 season. The MISL received no broadcast revenues from ESPN. In other words, the agreement with ESPN to had the league pay the cable network to televise its games. Bill Kentling, director and general manager of the Wichita Wings, was vehemently against the ESPN deal, thinking that was ridiculous to go against the National Football League without having any time to set up sponsorship. Commissioner Frank Dale however, disagreed with Kentling's assessment saying: “If I held out waiting for money for the rights for something that has traditionally not done well in the ratings, we'd still be off the air.” Ultimately, the MISL got only three sponsors for the weekly telecasts on ESPN.

For the 1986–87 season, ESPN actually paid the MISL a fee instead of the league paying the network, as it had done the previous season. This time, ESPN would broadcast 18 games, including the All-Star Game from Los Angeles, as well as four playoff games. The San Diego Sockers were scheduled be on four delayed telecasts during the regular season.

On commentary, ESPN employed JP Dellacamera, Bob Kurtz, Bob Ley, and Bob Carpenter on play-by-play with Ty Keough, Seamus Malin, and Shep Messing as analysts.

=== National Professional Soccer League ===
Starting with the 1993–94 season, NPSL games would be broadcast on both ESPN and the then brand new ESPN2, giving national exposure to the league. As part of a three-year agreement, a Game of the Week (dubbed Balls of Fire) would be televised on ESPN2 on Friday nights. ESPN2 would carry as many as 20 games in 1993–94 and 24 in 1994–95. Meanwhile, the best-of-five playoff finals in late April and the NPSL All-Star Game at St. Louis on February 22 would be carried on ESPN. It was routine however for ESPN to heavily edit rebroadcast of games that were initially aired on ESPN2 fit it into a two-hour time slot.

Dave Johnson and Art Kramer were ESPN's initial primary broadcast team. Other commentators included Gregg Mace and Ed Vucinic, who by 1995–96, would provide play-by-play for the NPSL Championship Series alongside Art Kramer.

=== UEFA Champions League ===
ESPN formerly had the rights of the UEFA Champions League between 1995 and 2009. Derek Rae and Tommy Smyth are the lead commentary team, with the ESPN2 team being Adrian Healey and Robbie Mustoe. The pre-match programme was hosted by Andrew Orsatti.

=== English Premier League ===
ESPN2 formerly aired matches from the Premier League between 1996 and 1998, and then from 2009 to 2013. From 2010 to 2013, ESPN2 had its own commentary team of Ian Darke and Steve McManaman calling the action live in England, with Darrell Currie, Dave Beckett, or Alicia Ferguson reporting pitchside. On occasion, the network would simulcast ESPN UK's coverage with full studio coverage from host Ray Stubbs or Rebecca Lowe and commentary from Jon Champion and Chris Waddle. In the U.S., ESPN's studio team was host Andrew Orsatti or Georgie Bingham with analyst Robbie Mustoe.

=== English Football League ===
ESPN aired select matches from the EFL Championship, EFL League One, EFL League Two, and EFL Cup on paid streaming service ESPN+. This broadcast started in 2017 and ended in 2024 when CBS Sports picked up the rights. Jon Champion and Stewart Robson lead on-site commentary. The 2020 promotion playoff Final was hosted by Alexis Nunes alongside pundit Don Hutchison and guest Jack Harrison. The 2021 promotion playoff Final was presented by Dan Thomas alongside Shaka Hislop in the studio, Don Hutchison and Alexis Nunes on-site, and Champion and Matt Lawrence commentating.

=== Serie A ===
In 2018, ESPN won the rights for Italy's Serie A when beIN Sports' contract expired. ESPN is set to air over 340 matches each season, with a Game of the Week on ESPN, ESPN2, or ESPNews and the rest of the matches on streaming service ESPN+. There is also a weekly preview and highlight show on ESPN+. ESPN uses its own broadcast teams for games shown on television - commentary is provided by play-by-play Mark Donaldson and analyst Matteo Bonetti - with all other matches each week shown on ESPN+. Ross Dyer and Steve Cangialosi fill-in when Donaldson is working MLB. Janusz Michallik works as the secondary game analyst. Commentary for matches on ESPN+ is taken from the World Feed. ESPN FC provides viewers with Serie A analysis show The Serie Awesome Podcast with Italian football writers Gabriele Marcotti, Mina Rzouki, and James Horncastle.

The rights package also including both Coppa Italia and Supercoppa Italiana tournaments. ESPN airs twenty-four matches of Coppa Italia, beginning from Round of 16 through two-leg semifinals on ESPN+. Meanwhile, the Coppa Italia Final and the Supercoppa Italiana will air on ESPN, ESPN2, or ESPNews also on ESPN Deportes. This broadcast started in January 2019. In May 2021, ESPN ended its coverage of Serie A as CBS Sports picked up the rights.

=== Scottish Professional Football League ===
ESPN acquires the rights of the Scottish Premiership started in October 2020. Every week, at least one match is airing on ESPN+ in English and Spanish. In addition, ESPN will also have coverage of select matches from the Scottish Championship, Scottish League Cup and Scottish Challenge Cup. Mark Donaldson and Steve Nicol commentate on high-profile matches. In July 2021, coverage was picked up by CBS Sports.

=== UEFA competitions for national teams ===
ESPN aired matches from the A-team, youth, and junior European Soccer Championships, UEFA Nations League, UEFA qualifying competitions, and UEFA friendlies. These matches were on all ESPN owned channels. These rights moved to Fox Sports after summer 2022.

=== USMNT/USWNT ===
ESPN/ABC have shared the rights for USMNT and USWNT matches with Fox Sports. For men's matches, Ian Darke or Jon Champion and Taylor Twellman or Kasey Keller commentated the action with Sebastian Salazar serving as the host alongside Kasey Keller, Jermaine Jones, Alejandro Moreno, and Herculez Gomez.

The women's matches were commentated by Ian Darke, Sebastian Salazar, Adrian Healey, or Glenn Davis alongside color commentator Julie Foudy.

These rights have now moved to TNT Sports in 2022.

=== Major League Soccer ===
ESPN aired MLS matches on ABC, ESPN, ESPN+ and ESPN2 from the league's beginning in 1996 until 2022. ABC aired select MLS games on Saturday and Sunday during the regular season, select playoff games annually, and the MLS Cup in odd-numbered years in 2019 and 2021. ESPN also aired out-of-market / some market games on ESPN+. Jon Champion and Taylor Twellman were the last lead broadcast team. (See MLS on ESPN). All coverage headed to Apple TV+ after 2022 and ESPN did not renew MLS rights.

=== Leagues Cup ===
ESPN annually aired the Leagues Cup, an interleague competition between all clubs from Major League Soccer and Liga MX on ESPN2 and ESPN+. When MLS launched MLS Season Pass on Apple TV+, all Leagues Cup matches moved there.

=== International Champions Cup ===
ESPN aired the summer friendly tournament International Champions Cup on ESPN, ESPN2, ESPN3, ESPN+, and ESPN Deportes until it was abolished in 2020.

== On-air personalities ==
=== Play-by-play announcers ===
Name	Nationality	Coverage	Notes
Ian Darke	(England)	La Liga; Copa del Rey; FA Cup	La Liga lead play-by-play announcer
Jon Champion	(England)	FA Cup; La Liga; Bundesliga	FA Cup lead play-by-play announcer
Derek Rae	(Scotland)	Bundesliga; DFB-Pokal	Bundesliga lead play-by-play announcer
Glenn Davis	(United States)	College Soccer	
Mark Donaldson	(Scotland)	La Liga; NWSL; USL	
Rob Palmer	(England)	La Liga; Copa del Rey	
Ross Dyer	(England)	DFB-Pokal; 2. Bundesliga; Bundesliga; La Liga	
Adrian Healey	(England)	La Liga	
Jenn Hildreth	(United States)	College Soccer; NWSL	Women's College Soccer and NWSL lead play-by-play announcer
Jonathan Yardley	(United States)	College Soccer; 2. Bundesliga; Bundesliga; La Liga	
Mike Watts	(United States)	USL; College Soccer	USL and SEC lead play-by-play announcer
Sebastian Salazar	(United States)	Copa del Rey; La Liga	
Ricardo Ortiz	(Spain)	La Liga	
Jorge Ramos	(Uruguay)	La Liga	

=== Color commentators ===
Name	Nationality	Coverage	Notes
Steve McManaman	(England)	La Liga; Copa del Rey; FA Cup	Lead La Liga color commentator
Stewart Robson	(England)	La Liga; FA Cup; Bundesliga	FA Cup lead color commentator
Jim Beglin	(Republic of Ireland)	FA Cup	
Lutz Pfannenstiel	(Germany)	Bundesliga; DFB-Pokal	Bundesliga and DFB-Pokal lead color commentator
Kasey Keller	(United States)	Bundesliga; DFB-Pokal; 2. Bundesliga; La Liga	
Craig Burley	(Scotland)	FA Cup; La Liga	
Matt Lawrence	(England)		
Alejandro Moreno	(Venezuela)	Mexico national football team Copa del Rey; La Liga	Lead Mexico color commentator
Janusz Michallik	(Poland)	Bundesliga; 2. Bundesliga; La Liga	
Danny Higginbotham	(England)	FA Cup	
Luis García	(Spain)	La Liga	
Pablo Zabaleta	(Argentina)	La Liga	
Diego Forlan	(Uruguay)	La Liga	
Lianne Sanderson	(England)	NWSL	
Jordan Angeli	(United States)	NWSL	
Devon Kerr	(United States)	USL; College Soccer	USL and Men's College Soccer lead color commentator
Lori Lindsey	(United States)	College Soccer	
Angela Hucles	(United States)	College Soccer	ACC lead color commentator
Cat Whitehill	(United States)	College Soccer	
Jillian Loyden	(United States)	College Soccer	

=== Presenters ===
Name	Nationality	Coverage	Notes
Dan Thomas	(England)	ESPN FC; FA Cup; La Liga	Lead ESPN FC and La Liga host
Sebastian Salazar	(United States)	ESPN FC; La Liga	ESPN FC fill-in host Fútbol Americas co-host
Kay Murray	(England)	ESPN FC; Bundesliga; La Liga	Lead Bundesliga host
Kelsey Riggs Cuff	(United States)	NWSL	
Alexis Nunes	(Jamaica)	ESPN FC	Digital

=== Studio analyst ===
Name	Nationality	Coverage	Notes
Steve McManaman	(England)	La Liga; ESPN FC	Lead La Liga color commentator
Kasey Keller	(United States)	Bundesliga	
Craig Burley	(Scotland)	ESPN FC; Bundesliga; FA Cup	Bundesliga and FA Cup lead studio analyst
Jan Åge Fjørtoft	(Norway)	Bundesliga; ESPN FC	Lead Bundesliga studio analyst
Stewart Robson	(England)	ESPN FC	
Jürgen Klinsmann	(Germany)	Bundesliga; ESPN FC	Lead Bundesliga studio analyst
Don Hutchison	(Scotland)	ESPN FC; FA Cup	
Alejandro Moreno	(Venezuela)	ESPN FC; Bundesliga; La liga	
Luis García	(Spain)	La Liga; ESPN FC	La Liga lead studio analyst
Pablo Zabaleta	(Argentina)	La Liga; ESPN FC	La Liga lead studio analyst
Claudio Pizzaro	(Peru)	Bundesliga	Bundesliga on-site analyst
Patrick Owomoyela	(Germany)	Bundesliga	Bundesliga on-site analyst
Hannes Wolf	(Germany)	Bundesliga	Bundesliga on-site analyst
Frank Leboeuf	(France)	ESPN FC	
Steve Nicol	(Scotland)	ESPN FC	
Shaka Hislop	(Trinidad and Tobago)	ESPN FC	
Herculez Gomez	(United States)	ESPN FC	Fútbol Americas co-host
Alessandro Del Piero	(Italy)	ESPN FC	
Nedum Onuoha	(England)	ESPN FC	
Ali Krieger	(United States)	ESPN FC; NWSL	
Mark Clattenburg	(England)	ESPN FC	Football Laws Analyst
Mina Rzouki	(England)	ESPN FC	Writer
Mark Ogden	(England)	ESPN FC	Writer
Sid Lowe	(England)	ESPN FC; LaLiga	Writer and Pitchside reporter
Julien Laurens	(France)	ESPN FC	Writer
Gabriele Marcotti	(Italy)	ESPN FC	Writer
Nicky Bandini	(Italy)	ESPN FC	Writer
Rodrigo Faez	(Spain)	La Liga; ESPN FC	Writer
Samuel Marsden	(Spain)	La Liga; ESPN FC	Writer
Moises Llorens	(Spain)	La Liga; ESPN FC	Writer
Milan van Dongen	(Netherlands)	Eredivisie; ESPN FC	

=== Reporters ===
Name	Nationality	Coverage	Notes
Martin Ainstein	(Spain)	Copa del Rey; La Liga	
Archie Rhind-Tutt	(England)	Bundesliga; ESPN FC	Bundesliga on-site host and reporter
Alexis Nunes	(Jamaica)	ESPN FC; FA Cup; La Liga	Host and reporter
Gemma Soler	(Spain)	La Liga; ESPN FC	
Sid Lowe	(England)	La Liga	

== Past international coverage and broadcast teams ==
=== FIFA World Cup ===
==== 1970 World Cup ====
This was the first World Cup on ABC featuring commentary from broadcaster Jim McKay.

==== 1982 World Cup ====
Coverage was led by Bob Ley and color commentator Seamus Malin. For the final on ABC, Jim McKay, Mario Machado, and Paul Gardner called the final between Italy and West Germany at Santiago Bernabeu Stadium. (See List of FIFA World Cup broadcasters)

==== 1986 World Cup ====
JP Dellacamera was the play-by-play announcer alongside color commentators Seamus Malin and Shep Messing. Remaining matches were called by the World Feed. (See List of FIFA World Cup broadcasters)

==== 1994 World Cup ====
The 1994 FIFA World Cup marked the return of the World Cup on ESPN and ABC and the first time they used their own commentary teams for all matches. Roger Twibell, Seamus Malin, and Rick Davis were the lead broadcast team. Al Trautwig and Davis were the secondary broadcast team. Other play-by-play announcers were: Bob Carpenter Bob Ley, Ian Darke, Randy Hahn, and Jim Donovan. Other color commentators were: Clive Charles, Ty Keough, Peter Vermes, Ron Newman, and Bill McDermott. Jim McKay was the studio host alongside studio analyst Desmond Armstrong only for games on ABC. (See List of FIFA World Cup broadcasters)

==== 1998 World Cup ====
Bob Ley and Seamus Malin was the lead broadcast team with four other broadcast teams include: Roger Twibell and Mike Hill, JP Dellacamera and Bill McDermott, Derek Rae and Ty Keough, and Phil Schoen and Tommy Smyth. Brent Musburger and Eric Wynalda worked in the studio for ABC while Phil Schoen and Dave Revsine hosted "World Cup2Night" on ESPN2 with analysts Julie Foudy, Keough, Smyth, and Jim St. Andre. (See List of FIFA World Cup broadcasters)

==== 2002 World Cup ====
Hockey play-by-play announcer Jack Edwards and color commentator Ty Keough led the commentary teams in South Korea and Japan. Three other broadcast teams called games in Bristol, Connecticut were: JP Dellacamera and Tommy Smyth, Glenn Davis and Shep Messing, and Mike Hill and Seamus Malin. Terry Gannon hosted in the studio alongside studio analysts Eric Wynalda and Giorgio Chinaglia. (See List of FIFA World Cup broadcasters)

==== 2006 World Cup ====
Lead MLS and MLB play-by-play announcer Dave O'Brien and color commentator Marcelo Balboa worked as the lead broadcast team in Germany with other broadcast teams: JP Dellacamera and John Harkes, Glenn Davis and Shep Messing, Adrian Healey and Tommy Smyth, and Rob Stone and Robin Fraser. Brent Musburger returned for his 2nd World Cup as lead studio host with other hosts Rece Davis, and Dave Revsine. Studio analysts in the studio were: Alexi Lalas, Eric Wynalda, Julie Foudy, and Heather Mitts. (See List of FIFA World Cup broadcasters)

==== 2010 World Cup ====
ESPN's coverage of the 2010 World Cup has been widely recognized as a breakthrough in US soccer broadcasting. Esteemed commentator Martin Tyler led a team of all-British commentators in South Africa, Chris Fowler and Mike Tirico were the lead hosts in a studio set right outside of Soccer City in South Africa. Martin Tyler, who called England games, worked with Efan Ekoku as the network's lead broadcast team. Ian Darke and John Harkes, who called USMNT games were the secondary broadcast team. Other broadcast teams were: Derek Rae and Ally McCoist, Adrian Healey and Robbie Mustoe, and Jim Proudfoot and Roberto Martínez. Studio analysts included: Steve McManaman, Jürgen Klinsmann, Roberto Martínez, Ruud Gullit, Alexi Lalas, Shaun Bartlett, and Tommy Smyth. Bob Ley was another studio host, working his 4th World Cup. Reporters were: Jeremy Schaap (USA and Final), Julie Foudy, Allen Hopkins, Rob Stone, Selema Masekela, Andrew Orsatti (Australia), John Sutcliffe (Mexico), and Dan Williams (South Africa).

==== 2014 World Cup ====
The 2014 World Cup marked the end of the FIFA World Cup on ABC and ESPN. Ian Darke and Steve McManaman were the lead broadcast team, Jon Champion and Stewart Robson were the #2 team. Other play-by-play announcers were: Derek Rae, Daniel Mann, Adrian Healey, and Fernando Palomo. Other color commentators: Taylor Twellman, Craig Burley, Efan Ekoku, Roberto Martínez, Kasey Keller, and Alejandro Moreno. All commentators were in Brazil with the top 5 teams at the stadiums while the remaining team called matches off monitors in Rio. Mike Tirico was the lead studio host alongside other hosts Bob Ley and Lynsey Hipgrave with analysts: Alexi Lalas, McManaman, Michael Ballack, Moreno, Keller, Gilberto Silva, Santiago Solari, Martínez, Twellman, and Ruud van Nistelrooy. Reporters included: Jeremy Schaap (Lead), Julie Foudy, Bob Woodruff, John Sutcliffe, and Rubens Pozzi.

=== UEFA European Football Championship ===
==== Euro 2008 ====
Following controversy over ESPN's "American" commentary teams, the network decided to use more traditional coverage by tapping Adrian Healey and Andy Gray or Robbie Mustoe to be its lead broadcast team. ESPN also tapped Derek Rae and Tommy Smyth to be its secondary broadcast team. The studio team featured hosts Rece Davis and Rob Stone with analysts Julie Foudy and Alexi Lalas. Gray and Smyth also served as pundits later in the nightly recap shows.

==== Euro 2012 ====
Ian Darke and Steve McManaman were the lead commentary team for ESPN, being on-site from Poland and Ukraine for the entire tournament. Other broadcast teams were: Adrian Healey and Robbie Mustoe and Derek Rae and Kasey Keller or Taylor Twellman with the former going on-site starting with the quarterfinals. The studio team was based at headquarters in Bristol. Studio hosts were Bob Ley, Max Bretos, and Rebecca Lowe. Studio analysts were: Michael Ballack, Alexi Lalas, Keller, Twellman, and Tommy Smyth. Glenn Hoddle and Roberto Martínez were the special contributors, who were live from Poland and Ukraine. Alicia Ferguson and Darrell Currie are the reporters.

==== Euro 2016 ====
ESPN was live in France with a set on the River Seine. Mike Tirico, Steve Bower, and Bob Ley hosted. Ian Darke, Steve McManaman, and Taylor Twellman returned as the lead broadcast team. Jon Champion and Stewart Robson were the secondary team. The top two broadcast teams called the games on-site in the country. Other play-by-play announcers were: Derek Rae, Adrian Healey, Mark Donaldson , and Max Bretos. Other color commentators were: Tommy Smyth, Alejandro Moreno, Kate Markgraf, and Paul Mariner. Studio analysts were: Craig Burley, Santiago Solari, Vincent Kompany, who missed that tournament with a serious injury, Julie Foudy, Roberto Martínez, Frank Leboeuf, Michael Ballack, and Kasey Keller. Jeremy Schaap, Marty Smith, and Alison Bender were reporters.

==== Euro 2020 ====
Euro 2020 is broadcast live by ABC (5 matches), ESPN (40 matches including Final), and ESPN2 (6 matches). This is the first time since 2008 that ABC broadcast the European Championships free-to-air. Rece Davis will be the lead host alongside Kelly Cates, Sebastian Salazar, Kay Murray, and Dalen Cuff. Ian Darke and Stewart Robson are the lead broadcast team, being based at Wembley Stadium in London. Other broadcast teams are: Jon Champion and Taylor Twellman, Derek Rae and Efan Ekoku, Steve Cangialosi and Alejandro Moreno, and Mark Donaldson and Matteo Bonetti. Studio analysts were: Steve McManaman, Alessandro Del Piero, Julie Foudy, Tim Howard, Sami Khedira, Frank Leboeuf, Chris Coleman, Nedum Onuoha, Kasey Keller, Christian Fuchs, Luis García, and Craig Burley. Former referee Mark Clattenburg will work as rules analyst. Reporters included: Sam Borden, Martin Ainstein, Archie Rhind-Tutt, and Alexis Nunes.

Initially, ESPN planned to send all commentators to every match and have studio programming originate out of an outdoor studio in London, however, due to the coronavirus, studio programming and all but one broadcast team are from ESPN HQ in Bristol. However, starting in the quarterfinals, ESPN sends Champion and Twellman to call the Belgium-Italy match from Allianz Arena in Munich and Italy-Spain semifinal match from Wembley. Darke and Twellman called the Euro 2020 Final at the same stadium.

=== Confederations Cup ===
==== 2009 Confederations Cup ====
Rece Davis and Alexi Lalas worked in the studio during the 2009 FIFA Confederations Cup. ESPN tapped MLS on ESPN's lead broadcast team of JP Dellacamera and John Harkes to be its lead broadcast team. Other broadcast teams were: Derek Rae and Tommy Smyth and Adrian Healey and Robbie Mustoe.

==== 2013 Confederations Cup ====
Bob Ley hosted in the studio alongside analysts Steve McManaman, Alexi Lalas, Roberto Martínez, and Michael Ballack. Ian Darke and Stewart Robson was the lead broadcast team. Other broadcast teams were: Fernando Palomo and Alejandro Moreno and Adrian Healey and Kasey Keller.

=== Broadcast teams ===
Year	Network	Play-by-play	Color commentator(s)	Reporters	Studio hosts	Studio analyst(s)
UEFA Women's Euro 2022	ESPN; ESPN2; ESPN+	Ian Darke; Jenn Hildreth; Jonathan Yardley	Julie Foudy; Lori Lindsey; Danielle Slaton	Alexis Nunes	Kay Murray; Sebastian Salazar	Emma Hayes, Steffi Jones, and Danielle Slaton
UEFA Euro 2020	ESPN; ESPN2; ABC	Ian Darke; Jon Champion; Derek Rae; Steve Cangialosi; Mark Donaldson	Stewart Robson; Taylor Twellman; Efan Ekoku; Alejandro Moreno; Matteo Bonetti	Sam Borden; Martin Ainstein; Archie Rhind-Tutt; Alexis Nunes	Rece Davis; Kelly Cates; Kay Murray; Sebastian Salazar; Dalen Cuff	Steve McManaman, Alessandro Del Piero, Julie Foudy, Tim Howard, Chris Coleman, Sami Khedira, Frank Leboeuf, Nedum Onuoha, Kasey Keller, Craig Burley, Christian Fuchs, Luis García, Taylor Twellman, Efan Ekoku, Alejandro Moreno, Matteo Bonetti, and Mark Clattenburg (Rules)
UEFA Euro 2016	ESPN; ESPN2	Ian Darke; Jon Champion; Derek Rae; Adrian Healey; Mark Donaldson; Max Bretos	Taylor Twellman; Steve McManaman; Stewart Robson; Tommy Smyth; Alejandro Moreno; Kate Markgraf; Paul Mariner	Jeremy Schaap; Julie Foudy; Marty Smith; Alison Bender	Steve Bower; Mike Tirico; Bob Ley	Craig Burley, Michael Ballack, Santiago Solari, Vincent Kompany, Steve McManaman, Taylor Twellman, Julie Foudy, Roberto Martínez, Frank Leboeuf, and Kasey Keller
2014 FIFA World Cup	ESPN; ESPN2; ABC	Ian Darke; Jon Champion; Derek Rae; Adrian Healey; Daniel Mann; Fernando Palomo	Steve McManaman; Taylor Twellman; Stewart Robson; Efan Ekoku; Kasey Keller; Alejandro Moreno; Roberto Martínez; Craig Burley	Jeremy Schaap; Julie Foudy; John Sutcliffe; Bob Woodruff; Rubens Pozzi	Mike Tirico; Bob Ley; Lynsey Hipgrave	Alexi Lalas; Steve McManaman; Michael Ballack; Alejandro Moreno; Kasey Keller; Gilberto Silva; Santiago Solari; Roberto Martínez; Taylor Twellman; Ruud van Nistelrooy
2013 FIFA Confederations Cup	ESPN; ESPN2; ABC	Ian Darke; Adrian Healey; Fernando Palomo	Stewart Robson; Kasey Keller; Alejandro Moreno	John Sutcliffe	Bob Ley	Steve McManaman, Kasey Keller, Roberto Martinez, Alexi Lalas
UEFA Euro 2012	ESPN; ESPN2; ABC	Ian Darke; Derek Rae; Adrian Healey	Steve McManaman; Kasey Keller; Taylor Twellman; Robbie Mustoe	Alicia Ferguson; Darrell Currie	Bob Ley; Rebecca Lowe; Max Bretos	Michael Ballack, Alexi Lalas, Kasey Keller, Tommy Smyth, Taylor Twellman, Glenn Hoddle, and Roberto Martínez
2010 FIFA World Cup	ESPN; ESPN2; ABC	Martin Tyler; Ian Darke; Derek Rae; Adrian Healey; Jim Proudfoot	Efan Ekoku; John Harkes; Robbie Mustoe; Ally McCoist; Roberto Martínez	Jeremy Schaap; Julie Foudy; Darrell Currie; Allen Hopkins; Rob Stone; Selema Masekela; ESPN International: Andrew Orsatti (Australia); John Sutcliffe (Mexico); Dan Williams (South Africa)	Chris Fowler; Mike Tirico; Bob Ley	Alexi Lalas; Jürgen Klinsmann; Ruud Gullit; Steve McManaman; Shaun Bartlett; Tommy Smyth; Roberto Martínez
2009 FIFA Confederations Cup	ESPN; ESPN2; ABC	JP Dellacamera; Derek Rae; Adrian Healey	John Harkes; Tommy Smyth; Robbie Mustoe	—N/a	Rece Davis	Alexi Lalas
UEFA Euro 2008	ESPN; ESPN2; ABC	Adrian Healey; Derek Rae	Andy Gray; Tommy Smyth	Pedro Gomez	Rece Davis; Rob Stone	Julie Foudy, Alexi Lalas, Andy Gray, and Tommy Smyth
2006 FIFA World Cup	ESPN; ESPN2; ABC	Dave O'Brien; JP Dellacamera; Rob Stone; Glenn Davis; Adrian Healey	Marcelo Balboa; John Harkes; Robin Fraser; Shep Messing; Tommy Smyth	—N/a	Brent Musburger; Rece Davis; Dave Revsine	Alexi Lalas; Eric Wynalda; Giorgio Chinaglia; Julie Foudy; Heather Mitts
2002 FIFA World Cup	ESPN; ESPN2; ABC	Jack Edwards; JP Dellacamera; Mike Hill; Glenn Davis	Ty Keough; Tommy Smyth; Seamus Malin; Shep Messing	Lisa Salters; Veronica Paysee	Terry Gannon; Rob Stone	Eric Wynalda; Giorgio Chinaglia
1998 FIFA World Cup	ESPN; ESPN2; ABC	Bob Ley; Roger Twibell; JP Dellacamera; Derek Rae; Phil Schoen	Seamus Malin; Mike Hill; Bill McDermott; Tommy Smyth; Ty Keough	—N/a	Brent Musburger	Eric Wynalda
1994 FIFA World Cup	ESPN; ESPN2; ABC	Roger Twibell; Al Trautwig; Bob Carpenter; Bob Ley; Ian Darke; Randy Hahn; Jim Donovan	Seamus Malin; Rick Davis; Clive Charles; Ty Keough; Peter Vermes; Ron Newman; Bill McDermott	—N/a	Jim McKay (ABC only); Sharlene Hawkes (ESPN World Cup Tonight only)	Desmond Armstrong (ABC only); Alexi Lalas (quarterfinals); Mike Hill (ESPN World Cup Tonight only)
1986 FIFA World Cup	ESPN	JP Dellacamera; Bob Ley	Seamus Malin; Shep Messing			
1982 FIFA World Cup	ESPN	Bob Ley	Seamus Malin			
