= UEFA European Championship on United States television =

The UEFA European Football Championship, commonly known as the UEFA European Championship and informally as the Euros, is the primary soccer competition contested by the senior men's national teams of the members of the Union of European Football Associations (UEFA), determining the continental champion of Europe. Held every four years since 1960, in the even-numbered year between World Cup tournaments, it was originally called the European Nations' Cup, changing to the current name in 1968.

== History ==
=== Setanta Sports (2000–2004) ===
Coverage of the 2000 Euros was only available to Americans via pay-per-view. More specifically, via closed-circuit television, DirecTV, the DISH Network, and iNDemand cable pay-per-view. Viewers had the option of paying $20 per match, or $149 for the entire tournament. Setanta also charged bars $3,000 for the privilege to carry their coverage. This often meant a $20 cover charge. Fox Sports World did however, offer the rebroadcasts of games on a week-long delay.

Pay-per-view was still the primary option come the 2004 Euros. This time, the price for the entire tournament was worth $179 while the price for bars rose to $4,000. Five live games were however, broadcast on Fox Sports World and Fox Sports Espanol. All quarters and semis would be broadcast on a five-day tape delay, with the final airing on a three-day delay. According to Setanta CEO Michael O'Rourke, they we offered the events to ESPN and Fox Sports Net. Setanta even offered to pay them to put it on, but there just was no appetite.

=== ESPN/ABC (2008–2020) ===
ESPN first aired the UEFA Euros in 2008 after reached an agreement with UEFA in December 2006. With UEFA wanting the reverberations of the Euros to reach an international audience, ESPN decided to broadcast all matches live and online in 2008. After receiving good reaction from viewers, ESPN and UEFA continued to work by becoming official broadcasters of 2012, 2016 and 2020 tournament.

==== Distribution of match broadcasts ====
- 2008: ESPN (7 matches), ESPN2 (17 matches), ESPN Classic (5 matches), ABC (2 matches including final)
- 2012: ESPN (22 matches including Final), ESPN2 (9 matches)
- 2016: ESPN (39 matches including Final), ESPN2 (12 matches)
- 2020: ESPN (40 matches including Final), ESPN2 (6 matches), ABC (5 matches)

=== Fox Sports (2024–present) ===
In 2021, Fox Sports outbid ESPN for the rights of Euro 2024 and Euro 2028.

== On-air talent ==
Year	Networks	Play-by-play	Color commentator(s)	Reporters	Studio host(s)	Studio analyst(s)
2024	Fox; Fox Sports 1	Ian Darke; Derek Rae; Jacqui Oatley; Darren Fletcher	Landon Donovan; Robert Green; Warren Barton; Owen Hargreaves	Geoff Shreeves; Tom Rinaldi; Michael Times	Jules Breach	Giorgio Chiellini, Daniel Sturridge, Peter Schmeichel, Ariane Hingst, Alexi Lalas, Stuart Holden, Maurice Edu
2020	ESPN; ESPN2; ABC	Ian Darke; Jon Champion; Derek Rae; Steve Cangialosi; Mark Donaldson	Stewart Robson; Taylor Twellman; Efan Ekoku; Alejandro Moreno; Matteo Bonetti	Sam Borden; Martin Ainstein; Archie Rhind-Tutt; Alexis Nunes	Rece Davis; Kelly Cates; Kay Murray; Sebastian Salazar; Dalen Cuff	Steve McManaman, Alessandro Del Piero, Julie Foudy, Tim Howard, Chris Coleman, Sami Khedira, Frank Leboeuf, Nedum Onuoha, Kasey Keller, Craig Burley, Christian Fuchs, Luis García, Taylor Twellman, Efan Ekoku, Alejandro Moreno, Matteo Bonetti, and Mark Clattenburg (Rules)
2016	ESPN; ESPN2	Ian Darke; Jon Champion; Derek Rae; Adrian Healey; Mark Donaldson; Max Bretos	Taylor Twellman; Steve McManaman; Stewart Robson; Tommy Smyth; Alejandro Moreno; Kate Markgraf; Paul Mariner	Jeremy Schaap; Marty Smith; Alison Bender	Steve Bower; Mike Tirico; Bob Ley	Craig Burley, Michael Ballack, Santiago Solari, Vincent Kompany, Steve McManaman, Taylor Twellman, Julie Foudy, Roberto Martínez, Frank Leboeuf, and Kasey Keller
2012	ESPN; ESPN2	Ian Darke; Adrian Healey; Derek Rae	Steve McManaman; Robbie Mustoe; Kasey Keller; Taylor Twellman	Alicia Ferguson; Darrell Currie	Bob Ley; Max Bretos; Rebecca Lowe	Michael Ballack, Alexi Lalas, Kasey Keller, Tommy Smyth, Taylor Twellman, Glenn Hoddle, and Roberto Martínez
2008	ESPN; ESPN2; ABC	Adrian Healey; Derek Rae	Andy Gray; Robbie Mustoe; Tommy Smyth	Pedro Gomez	Rece Davis; Rob Stone	Julie Foudy, Alexi Lalas, Andy Gray, and Tommy Smyth

=== Notes ===
- The opening match of Euro 2016 between host France and Romania was switched to ESPN2 as ESPN aired the funeral of Muhammad Ali.

== Spanish-language television ==
=== Euro 2012 ===
ESPN Deportes giving comprehensive coverage of the event with more than 6.5 live hours daily with 27 matches is shown live, and 4 tape-delayed matches (due to simultaneous group stage matches on last matchday). Jorge Ramos and Hernan Pereyra led the broadcast teams with the other is included: Fernando Palomo and Rafa Puente, and Ricardo Ortiz and José Antonio Noriega. José Ramón Fernández hosted studio coverage with analysts Andres Agulla, Jose Hernandez, Mario Kempes, Richard Mendez, Noriega, and Barak Fever. Reporters included Martin Ainstein, Vito De Palma, Alex de la Rosa.

=== Euro 2016 ===
ESPN Deportes airing 45 matches live, and six matches were tape-delayed (due to simultaneous group stage matches on last matchday). Fernando Palomo and José Antonio Noriega was the lead broadcast team. Other play-by-play announcers were: Ricardo Ortiz, Omar Orlando Salazar and Emilio Fernando Alonso. Color commentators: Mario Kempes, Roberto Gomez Junco, Ricardo Mayorga and Hernan Pereyra. Jorge Ramos leads studio coverage while Andres Agulla, Carolina Guillen and Tony Cherchi also presenting. Studio analysts were: Kempes, Mauro Camoranesi, Barak Fever, Richard Mendez, Ortiz, Alex Pareja, Pereyra, Rafael Puente del Rio and Jose del Valle. Martin Ainstein and Manu Martin are the reporters.

=== Euro 2020 ===
This event marked a new era for Spanish language broadcasts with Univision being selected as the official broadcaster. 40 matches will be broadcast and streamed on PrendeTV, Univision's newly launched, ad-supported streaming service with the remaining 11 matches will airing on Univision and TUDN including the Turkey vs. Italy opening game at the Stadio Olimpico in Rome, both semifinals, and the final. Coverage is led by presenters Adriana Monsalve, Lindsay Casinelli, and Alejandro Berry who joined by numerous commentators, such as play-by-play Luis Omar Tapia, Paco Villa, José Luis López Salido, and José Hernández, and color commentators: Diego Balado, Iván Zamorano, Hristo Stoichkov, Tony Cherchi, Marc Crosas and Hugo Salcedo. Also contributing as studio analysts and co-commentators is former players Carles Puyol, Mauro Camoranesi, and Javier Zanetti. Daniel Chanona and Cristina Romero reporting on location from Europe.

== See also ==
- Sports broadcasting contracts in the United States#International competitions
