= Ross Dyer =

British football commentator

Ross Dyer (born 20 December 1977) is a British sports and entertainment broadcaster. He is currently a football commentator and presenter for ESPN and Fox Sports in the United States.

== United States ==
=== ESPN ===
At ESPN International he presents for ESPN FC, and commentates: UEFA Champions League, UEFA Europa League, Serie A, La Liga, Bundesliga, 2.Bundesliga, DFB-Pokal, UEFA European Championship, FIFA World Cup Qualifying matches from Europe and South America. His co-commentators have included: Frank Leboeuf, Robbie Mustoe, Craig Burley, Shaka Hislop, Kyle Martino, Shep Messing, Tommy Smyth, Janusz Michallik, Paul Mariner and Steve Nicol.

In April 2014, it was announced that he would again be one of ESPN Radio's play-by-play commentators for the 2014 FIFA World Cup, having also commentated on the network's critically acclaimed coverage of the 2010 FIFA World Cup.

In July 2016 he commentated the UEFA Euro 2016 semi-finals and final for ESPN Radio.

=== FOX Sports ===
At FOX Sports he commentates and presents studio coverage for: UEFA Champions League, UEFA Europa League, Bundesliga, FIFA U-20 World Cup, FIFA U-17 World Cup, CONCACAF Gold Cup. He also hosts Multi-Match 90: an NFL RedZone-style show which broadcasts on UEFA Champions League, UEFA Europa League and Bundesliga matchdays, showing goals and highlights from all the games.

His co-commentators have included: Brad Friedel, Stuart Holden, Warren Barton, Ian Joy, Brian Dunseth, Tony Meola, Eric Wynalda and Alexi Lalas.

=== Amazon Video ===
==== NFL Thursday Night Football ====
For Amazon Video he has provided UK English commentary on NFL games during Thursday Night Football. On 28 September 2017 in a game between Chicago Bears and Green Bay Packers, Dyer commentated alongside Tommy Smyth as Amazon launched its coverage of its first major sports streaming property. Earlier that month, Dyer commentated on Amazon Video's first ever globally-streamed live event: 2017 Mr. Olympia from Las Vegas.

==== Queen's Club Championships ====
In June 2018, Dyer co-presented Amazon Video's coverage of the ATP Queen's Club Championships. The event was Amazon's first UK sports or live broadcast.

=== BeIN Sports ===
Between 2012 and 2014 he worked for beIN Sports . This included being a regular on "The Express Extra" analysis show and "The Locker Room" debate show, and commentating on games from Italy's Serie A, Spain's La Liga, France's Ligue 1, England's The Championship and FIFA World Cup Qualifying matches from South America, Africa and CONCACAF. At beIN Sports he worked with co-commentators such as Bodo Illgner, Christian Vieri, Ray Hudson and Ian Joy.

== United Kingdom ==
=== AFC Bournemouth ===
Dyer started his career by creating the in-house media office at AFC Bournemouth in 1999, working on the club's publicity and PR campaigns, including setting up the club's first press office, co-ordinating communications for the new stadium project, and co-ordinating the launch of a new-format website.

=== ITV Sport ===
In October 2001, he joined ITV Sport, where he became the main reporter at the company's Southampton office, working across Football, Tennis, Boxing and Motorsport on shows such as Channel 4's Football Italia, Meridian Match, Soccer Sunday, Football Week UK, KOTV, Meridian Motorsport, GP Weekly, The ATP Tennis Show and Arsenal TV. He also narrated several football club DVDs and end of season DVDs such as Arsenal's Centurions as well as seasonal offerings from Reading, Portsmouth and Southampton.

He also began producing programmes during his time at ITV Sport, and one of his first shows was Manchester United in the USA (2003) covering the club's first pre-season tour of the US, which was broadcast on Bravo TV and MUTV.

=== TV Production ===
In the summer of 2004, Ross moved away from ITV Sport and took on various production contracts with both Arsenal and Southampton through his company, 1.21 Media Communications. Dyer produced, and reported on all of Arsenal Reserves matches for Arsenal TV Online between 2004 and 2008.

In the summer of 2007 he produced and directed a show for Sky Sports featuring Gary McAllister, Alan McInally, Russell Osman and Tony Dorigo on their 1000-mile bike ride from the new Wembley Stadium to La Manga in Spain, in aid of the fight against Breast Cancer. This was called Boys out on Bikes.

=== Sky Sports & IMG ===
His freelance career at this time included three years as a commentator with IMG, on Premier League mobile phone coverage, and three years as a reporter for Sky Sports on their Football League coverage, reporting for Soccer Saturday, also reporting for and voicing the Football League Review and Big League Weekend programmes.

=== London 2012 Paralympics ===
In 2012, he commentated on Channel 4's BAFTA and RTS award-winning 2012 Summer Paralympics coverage. He featured on "C4 Para 1, 2 & 3" (three additional digital channels provided throughout the Games), on BSkyB, Virgin TV, FreeSat and Freeview platforms as well as online at Channel4.com.

Dyer commentated on Track Cycling (including GB's first Gold Medal of the Paralympics for Sarah Storey) Wheelchair Basketball, Wheelchair Tennis, Wheelchair Rugby, Powerlifting and 7-a-side Football.

== Voiceover ==
In 2009, Dyer provided the voiceover for NikeID's video tutorial on their UK website, designed by R/GA.

As well as providing four character voices for the 2006 video game, Caesar IV, in 2012 he also provided the voice of the character, Myrnin in the trailer to New York Times best-selling author, Rachel Caine's novel, Black Dawn from her series, The Morganville Vampires. Dyer has also provided voice-overs for Starwood, Vedomosti, INRIX and various other corporations. He has hosted several travel videos for the USA's official tourism private-public partnership: Brand USA, aimed at marketing US states, cities and attractions to International visitors.

== Work ==
Dyer's work includes:

Sports hosting & commentary

- ESPNFC (ESPN)
- UEFA Champions League, UEFA Europa League, Bundesliga, Multimatch 90, 2014 FIFA Club World Cup, 2015 FIFA Club World Cup, 2015 FIFA U-20 World Cup, 2015 FIFA U-17 World Cup, 2015 CONCACAF Gold Cup, 2016 CONCACAF Women's U-17 Championship (Fox Sports)
- SportsCenter: 2018 FIFA World Cup (ESPN International) (Kwesé Sports)
- UEFA Euro 2016, 2014 FIFA World Cup, 2010 FIFA World Cup (ESPN Radio)
- UEFA Champions League, UEFA Europa League, Serie A, Bundesliga, La Liga (ESPN International)
- Queen's Club Championships (Amazon Video)
- NFL Thursday Night Football (Amazon Video)
- 2017 Mr. Olympia (Amazon Video)
- The Championship, La Liga, Serie A, Ligue 1, 2014 FIFA World Cup Qualification (BeIN Sports)
- 2012 Summer Paralympics (Channel 4)
- Soccer Saturday, Soccer Special, Big League Weekend, Football League Review (Sky Sports)
- Final Score (BBC 1)
- The Championship (BT Vision)
- 3-G Premier League Mobile highlights (Vodafone and 3)
- Football Italia (Channel 4)
- Goalissimo (Channel 4)
- KOTV (Channel 4)
- The ATP Tennis Show (Worldwide Television)
- Football Week UK (ITV Sport)
- Boys Out On Bikes (Sky Sports)

Video games

- Caesar IV (providing four character voices)

Voiceover

- NikeID
- Starwood
- IBQ
- Vedomosti
- INRIX
