= ESPN FC =

Streaming service of soccer content

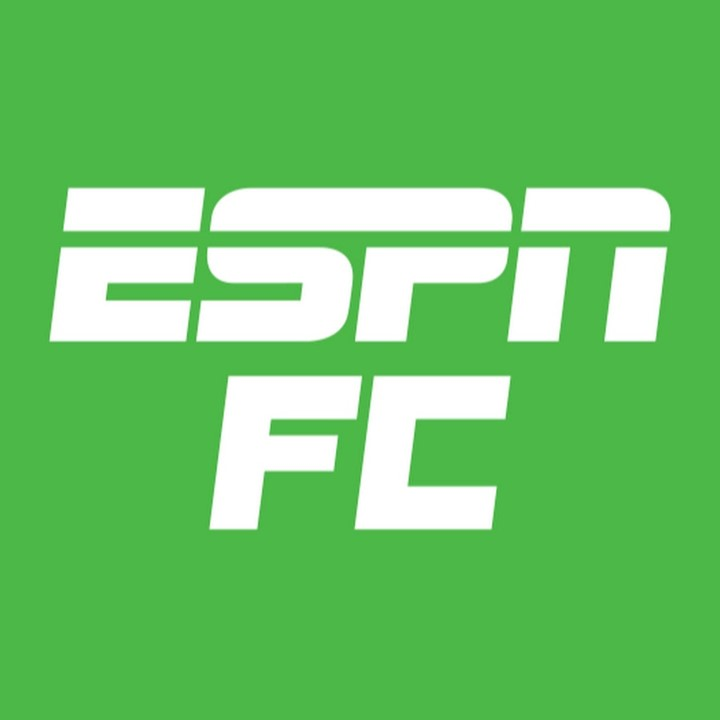
- Owner: ESPN, LLC
- Website: espnfc.com
- Registration: Optional
- Launched: 1995; 31 years ago (as SoccerNet)

ESPN FC (formerly ESPN SoccerNet) is a website and a U.S. television studio program covering soccer that is broadcast daily over the streaming service ESPN+. ESPN FC's origin was a website owned by ESPN, LLC Originally established in 1995 as SoccerNet, the website was acquired by ESPN in 1999. The domain ESPNFC.com now redirects to soccer news coverage on ESPN.com.

== History ==
Originally titled SoccerNet, the website was established by Greg Hadfield and his then-teenage son Tom in 1995, initially providing live score updates, tables and news articles. Greg, at that time, worked for the Daily Mail and in order to gain capital, effectively rescinded ownership of the site to his bosses in return for £40,000 and a revenue sharing scheme.

In 1999, Buena Vista Internet Group (BVIG) acquired a controlling interest of 60 percent in SoccerNet from the Daily Mail and General Trust for £15M.

== Television program ==
ESPN eventually launched a U.S. television studio program on ESPNews, ESPN2, BT Sport, ESPN Australia, and TSN dedicated to soccer, also known as ESPN FC. The program originally aired on weekday evenings at 6 PM and was originally known as ESPN Soccernet's Press Pass (until the mid 2010s), before changing to its current name, "ESPNFC" TV with a weekly recap show that airs on Sunday nights. The program has a mostly British cast. Dan Thomas works as the lead host with Adrian Healey, Sebastian Salazar, Alexis Nunes and Kay Murray filling in.

The studio analysts at the Bristol, Connecticut studio are: Craig Burley, Steve Nicol, Shaka Hislop, Kasey Keller, and Alejandro Moreno. The rest of the crew joins from London and Europe, and on occasion, in the studio, and includes: Ian Darke, Steve McManaman, Stewart Robson, Julien Laurens, Gabriele Marcotti, Don Hutchison, Danny Higginbotham, Frank Leboeuf, Jan Aage Fjortoft, Sid Lowe, Derek Rae, Jürgen Klinsmann, Nedum Onuoha, Alessandro Del Piero, and Santiago Solari. Taylor Twellman, and Herculez Gomez contribute to MLS segments. Other guest pundits over the years have included: Raphael Honigstein, James Horncastle, Martin Keown, Glenn Hoddle, Roberto Martínez, the late Kevin Keegan, Max Bretos, and Alexi Lalas.

Former presenters and regular pundits included: the British trio of Rebecca Lowe, Robbie Mustoe, and Robbie Earle (the three of whom moved to NBC's Football Coverage in the late 2010s), while others like Darrell Currie, Janusz Michallik, Australian presenter Andrew Orsatti, and legendary Irish commentator Tommy Smyth were analysts at different periods during the 2000s through early 2010s. Also, the now late Paul Mariner used to work as a studio analyst until the COVID-19 period.

ESPN FC also has additional programming like The Gab and Juls Podcast, which has become a TV programme, and the John Dykes Show. In April 2018, the program moved exclusively to the supplemental subscription service ESPN+, though occasional specials will still air on ESPN2.

== Controversy ==
In November 2013, a favorable story about Qatar's preparations for the 2022 FIFA World Cup on the site was met with backlash for author Phil Ball's dismissal of allegations of abuses toward migrant workers by the Qatari government. ESPN later apologized and removed the story from the website, saying that it did not meet their "journalistic standards".
