= Krystian Michallik =

Polish footballer

Personal information
- Full name: Krystian Jan Michallik
- Date of birth: 13 May 1944 (age 82)
- Place of birth: Chorzów, Poland
- Height: 1.78 m (5 ft 10 in)
- Position: Defender

Senior career*
| Years | Team | Apps | (Gls) |
| –1964 | AKS Chorzów | | |
| 1964–1976 | Gwardia Warsaw | | |
| 1976 | Connecticut Bicentennials | 9 | (1) |
| 1977–1988 | Connecticut Yankees | | |
| 1978–1983 | White Eagles Bridgeport | | |

International career
| 1966–1968 | Poland | 2 | (0) |
- * Club domestic league appearances and goals

Krystian Jan Michallik (born 13 May 1944) is a Polish former footballer who played as a defender. He played in two matches for the Poland national football team from 1966 to 1968. His son Janusz played internationally for the United States.
