= Adrian Healey =

English football commentator

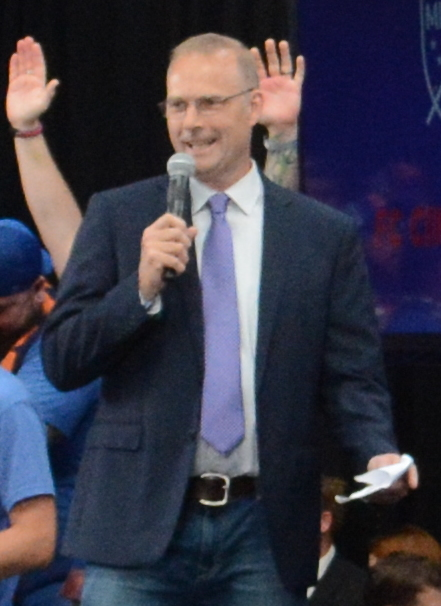
- Healey at an MLS event in 2018
- Born: Swindon, Wiltshire, England
- Occupation: Association football commentator
- Years active: 1992–present
- Employer: Austin FC

Adrian Healey is an English football commentator, currently working for ESPN and most recently with MLS Season Pass broadcasts on Apple TV. He is a veteran football commentator in the U.S., working for networks such as ESPN; he was part of the ESPN commentary team in South Africa for the 2010 World Cup. He has also been a fill-in host for Dan Thomas on ESPN's soccer show ESPN FC.

== Broadcasting career ==
Healey started work in the US in 1992 as a mid day DJ for Boston's WFNX. He then got a TV job commentating for the New England Revolution, replacing the departing Derek Rae. He left the Revolution to join ESPN/ABC, where he started with play-by-play commentary with Robbie Mustoe on ESPN2's alternate broadcast of UEFA Champions League play. The pair worked together for La Liga, the UEFA Euro 2008, the 2009 FIFA Confederations Cup, the 2010 FIFA World Cup, and UEFA Euro 2012 coverage.

Healey served as a play-by-play announcer for NBC Sports' coverage of soccer at the 2008 Summer Olympics.

He served as lead play-by-play announcer for ESPN's coverage of Major League Soccer until 2018, pairing with lead color commentator Taylor Twellman. In the summer of 2011, he took a break from his MLS duties to work with Kate Markgraf (most games) and Tony DiCicco (select games) on the network's secondary broadcast team for the FIFA Women's World Cup telecasts.

In 2019, Healey was replaced by Jon Champion on MLS Game of the Week telecasts, and he now commentates on DFB-Pokal matches alongside Markgraf or Taylor Twellman and UEFA International qualifiers alongside Craig Burley. However, he still hosts MLS on ESPN broadcasts with Kasey Keller and Alejandro Moreno as analysts.

Beginning in 2021, Healey became the voice of Austin FC. Also in 2021, Healey became one of the play-by-play announcers of La Liga on ESPN.

Healey announced via Twitter that he would work MLS matches on Apple TV during the 2023 season. In December of that year, he tweeted that he had left MLS and Apple TV.

== TV credits ==
- FIFA World Cup: 2006 (ESPN/ABC), 2010 (ESPN/ABC), 2014 (ESPN/ABC)
- UEFA European Championship: 2008 (Including Final) (ESPN/ABC), 2012 (ESPN), 2016 (ESPN)
- FIFA Women's World Cup: 2007 (ESPN), 2011 (ESPN)
- UEFA Champions League: 2003–2018 (ESPN)
- MLS: 2011–2018 (ESPN) (Lead), 2019–2020, 2021–22 (ESPN/ABC) (#2 PxP/Presenter)
- UEFA European Qualifiers: 2005–2020, 2021–present (ESPN)
- UEFA Nations League: 2018–2020 (ESPN)
- DFB-Pokal: 2019–2020 (ESPN)
- Summer Olympics (Soccer): 2008 (NBC Sports)
- La Liga: 2003–2009, 2021–present (ESPN)
- New England Revolution: 1998–2003
- Austin FC: 2021–22
- MLS Season Pass: 2023

== Personal life ==
Healey is from Swindon in Wiltshire, England. He lives in Austin, Texas with his wife Eleanor, son Tyler, and daughter Zoe.

Media offices
Preceded by Ian Darke	MLS Cup play-by-play announcer 2012–2017 (concurrent with Fox's John Strong in even numbered years)	Succeeded by Jon Champion
