= Jon Champion =

British sports commentator

- Born: Jonathan Martin Champion; 23 May 1965 (age 61); Harrogate, England
- Education: Archbishop Holgate's Grammar School, York, University of Leeds (Trinity & All Saints College) (1988)
- Occupations: Journalist; Sports commentator

Jonathan Martin Champion (born 23 May 1965) is a British sports commentator currently working as an association football commentator for ESPN and NBC Sports. Champion is a well-established and experienced commentator who has also worked for the BBC and ITV. He currently covers the FA Cup for ESPN and the Premier League for NBC Sports.

== Early life ==
Jonathan Martin Champion was born on 23 May 1965 in Harrogate, West Riding of Yorkshire.

== BBC Sport ==
Champion joined BBC Sport in the late 1980s and worked as a football commentator on BBC Radio Five Live between 1992 and 1996. He worked alongside Alan Green, Mike Ingham, Ron Jones, Rob Hawthorne, and Jonathan Legard covering Premier League, FA Cup, League Cup, and Football League matches for the network. During this time, Champion commentated on the 1994 and 1996 First Division play-off Finals, and the 1996 UEFA Champions League Final between Juventus and Ajax.

In 1995, an opportunity arose to further Champion's career at the BBC. John Motson took a three-month break from his role as a commentator on Match of the Day, allowing Champion to be drafted in to cover. Champion spent the whole of the 1995–1996 season combining his Five Live duties with appearances as a commentator on Match of the Day. He was successful enough to move across to TV permanently the following season, after Clive Tyldesley left the BBC and rejoined ITV.

Champion spent five seasons between 1996 and 2001 as a full-time member of the BBC's commentary team, covering edited highlights of the Premier League and the FA Cup, in addition to occasional matches from the UEFA Cup. He also commentated on rugby league Challenge Cup games on BBC television, typically taking the televised Sunday game of each round with Ray French commentating on the Saturday game. From 2000 to 2003 Champion also worked on the BBC's cricket radio programme Test Match Special.

== ITV Sport ==
In the summer of 2000, ITV surprised the BBC with a successful bid for Premier League highlights. This kicked in from 2001 and left the BBC without any regular week-by-week football. Champion therefore moved to join ITV in 2001, and was a regular part of ITV's commentary team for the Premier League, League Cup, Football League, and the UEFA Champions League. He was loaned back to ITV for the 2010 FIFA World Cup and UEFA Euro 2012, usually working alongside his ESPN colleague Craig Burley. He returned to ITV Sport for the 2018 and 2022 FIFA World Cups, where he paired with Ally McCoist. The duo was one of the broadcast teams of commentators for Prime Video Sport's UK Premier League coverage.

== Setanta and ESPN ==
In 2007, Setanta Sports UK signed Champion as their lead FA Premier League play-by-play announcer. Champion remained contracted to ITV but was loaned out to Setanta. For two seasons, he thus managed to combine his ITV duties with live matches on Setanta. During the 2008–09 season, Champion was heard more on Setanta, who had also secured rights to the FA Cup. In May 2009, Champion commentated on his first FA Cup Final.

Within a month, Setanta had gone into administration and were forced to relinquish their football rights. These were scooped up by the Disney-owned sports broadcaster ESPN, who rapidly established a new sports channel ESPN UK for the U.K. and Ireland and started broadcasting Premier League football in August 2009. Champion moved across from ITV as their lead play-by-play commentator. He also commentated on the Europa League and the FA Cup in addition to being ESPN's lead Premier League commentator. On 14 May 2011, he commentated the FA Cup Final between Manchester City and Stoke City with Chris Waddle. He then was loaned back to ESPN for the 2014 FIFA World Cup and UEFA Euro 2016 alongside former Arsenal player Stewart Robson.

Champion now part-time commentates for USMNT friendlies alongside Kasey Keller when Ian Darke is not available. From 2019 to 2022 MLS seasons, Champion was named MLS on ESPN and USMNT lead play-by-play commentator and UEFA Euro 2020 #2 play-by-play announcer alongside lead color commentator Taylor Twellman. After ESPN/ABC lost MLS rights, he became their lead announcer for ESPN's coverage of the FA Cup and EFL Cup, working alongside Stewart Robson or Danny Higginbotham.

== NBC Sports ==
Champion joined NBC Sports on July 11, 2023 to commentate the Premier League for Sunday matches. He will continue his work for ESPN/ABC.

== TV credits ==
- FA Cup Finals: 2009 (Setanta), 2011, 2012 and 2013 (ESPN UK), 2021, 2022, 2023, 2024 (ESPN US)
- League Cup Finals: 2002, 2003, 2004, 2006, 2007, 2008 (ITV), 2021, 2022, 2023, 2024 (ESPN)
- Championship Play-off Final: 2005 (ITV), 2009 (ITV), 2021, 2022, 2024 (ESPN)
- FIFA World Cup: 1998 (BBC), 2002 (ITV), 2006 (ITV), 2010 (ITV), 2014 (ABC/ESPN), 2018 (ITV), 2022 (ITV), 2026 (ITV)
- USMNT Friendlies: 2014–2022 (ESPN)
- Premier League: 2007–2009 (Setanta), 2009–2013 (ESPN), 2013–2019, 2021–present (Premier League Productions), 2019–present (Prime Video UK), 2019 (BT Sport) 2023-present (NBC Sports)
- UEFA Champions League: 2001–2009 (ITV Sport), 2015–2019 (BT Sport), 2024-present (Prime Video UK)
- UEFA Europa League: 2009–2019 (ESPN/BT Sport)
- UEFA European Championship: 2000 (BBC), 2004 (ITV), 2008 (ITV), 2012 (ITV), 2016 (ESPN), 2020 (ABC/ESPN)
- UEFA Nations League: 2018–2021 (ABC/ESPN)
- MLS: 2019–2022 (ABC/ESPN)
- USWNT 2024 Summer Olympics: 2024 (NBC)

== Other media ==
Champion was the commentator for the first time in the Pro Evolution Soccer series from Pro Evolution Soccer 2008 to Pro Evolution Soccer 2015. He worked alongside analyst and former Irish international Mark Lawrenson from Pro Evolution Soccer 2008 to Pro Evolution Soccer 2010. From Pro Evolution Soccer 2011 to Pro Evolution Soccer 2015, he worked together with analyst from ITV, Jim Beglin. He was then replaced by Peter Drury as the commentator for Pro Evolution Soccer 2016.

== World Cup ==
Champion was selected as a commentator for ITV at the 2010 World Cup in South Africa. For the 2014 FIFA World Cup in Brazil he commentated for ESPN/ABC's coverage in the U.S. During the 2018 and 2022 tournaments, he was praised for his commentary partnership with Ally McCoist.

== Personal life ==
Champion is a supporter of York City F.C. Champion's late father, David Champion, was the deputy headmaster of the independent school Bootham School in York.

Preceded by Adrian Healey	MLS Cup play-by-play announcer 2018–2022 (concurrent with Fox's John Strong in odd numbered years)	Succeeded by John Strong and Jake Zivin
