= NikeID =

Personalization service by Nike

Nike By You

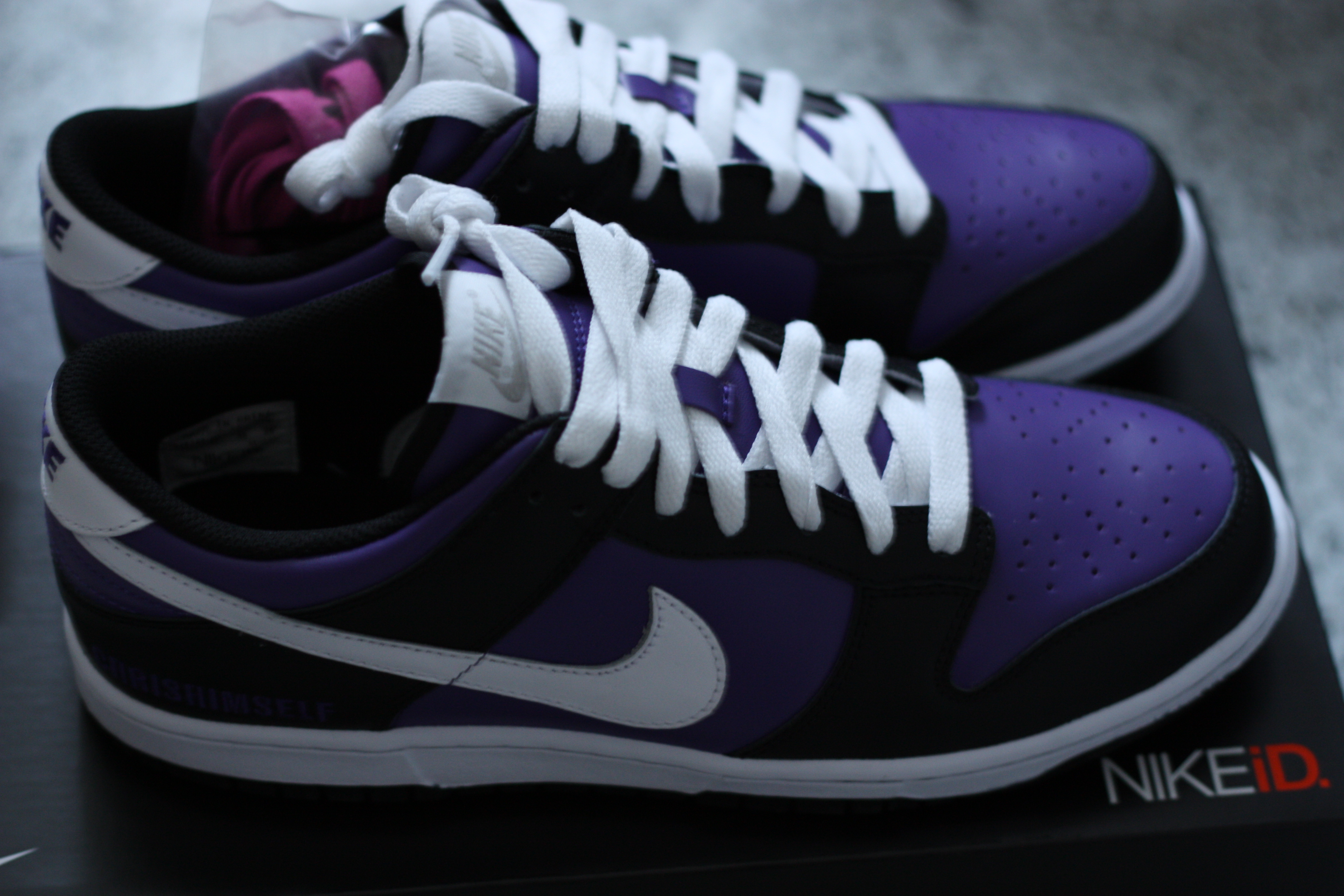
- Nike By You customized sneakers
- Product type: Personalized products
- Current owner: Nike, Inc.
- Country: Europe, Oceania
- Introduced: 1999; 27 years ago
- Website: nike.com/nike-by-you

Nike By You (Previously "NikeiD") is a service provided by Nike allowing customers to personalize and design their own Nike merchandise, most specifically footwear but also sportswear. They offer online services as well as physical studios in different countries around the world, including: United Kingdom, Italy, France, Japan, Spain, Germany, China, USA, Canada and Australia.

== Description ==
Nike By You is a service provided by Nike allowing customers to customize clothing and footwear purchased from Nike. The customer becomes the designer as they change and add a personal look and feel to a selected item. The service can be accessed both online from their homepage and in physical branches (called Nike By You Studios) which are situated in parts of Canada, France, England, Main Land Europe, China and the USA. In total, Nike By You has 102 studios where customer can access the customization design service.

The service was launched initially in 1999 and could only be accessed through their website. It provided customers the ability to choose from a limited range of different material and colors to develop their own style of tennis shoe. This initial launch allowed customers to customize Nike's Air Force One shoe. It gave a total of 31 different customizable parts including the base, overlay, accent, lining, stitching, outsole, laces and deubré. In total this shoe gave a choice of 82 different materials and option types. It has since expanded from a small web-based service to a large array of stores and new software applications to give customers a greater range of personalization and uniqueness in a variety of Nike shoes and clothing.

== Products ==
Nike By You mainly focuses on footwear, providing a selection of shoes which can then be personalized by the customer. The customer can choose which area of the shoe to personalize, changing the color and fabric to what they desire. This customization allows for a large amount of different designs to be created. And, if the customer does not want to have to design the shoes themselves, they can choose from a range of pre-made designs, or buy designs other customers have made.

As Nike By You, has developed they have changed from just personalized footwear to other items of sportswear. This is currently only available on their website, with the Nike By You studios focused on footwear.

=== Shoes ===
The shoes Nike By You offers customization over are listed in a range of sub-categories these include: association football, baseball, running, rugby football, basketball, athletics, skateboarding, and sportswear. Nike By You is constantly updating the collection of shoes that they offer for customization. Nike's most popular franchises are also represented including Air Max, Air Force 1, Nike Free, Nike LunarGlid Nike Dunk. Nike By You has also recently began offering the signature styles from such athletes as Kobe Bryant, LeBron James and Kevin Durant.

== Service ==
=== Online ===
The original concept and development began in 1999 by Red Sky Interactive as a JavaScript website featuring only two sneakers with a combination of colorways, but with a form field enabling personalization on the rear of the shoe. This helped enable automated moderation of keywords as well as submitting the order into the supply chain. In 2005, R/GA was given the task to redesign the website to give it "a premium, e-commerce experience". The original HTML site was replaced entirely by a new Flash based website claimed to give it a more user-friendly experience and stylish look. The ability to save designs using the myLocker account, on the NIKEiD website, has sparked many bloggers and designers to show off their designs.

=== In store ===
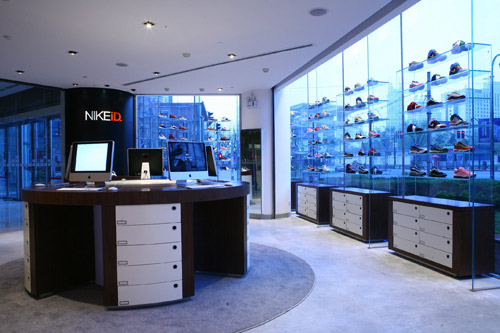
The Shanghai Nike By You Studio

The Nike By You studios are intended to give the customer an even greater personal experience. The studios have professionally trained designers within for customers to work with. Inside the studios there is a greater range of colours, materials and shoes to pick from.

=== iPhone app ===
On 14 October 2012, the Nike By You App for iPhone and iPod Touch was released on the iTunes App Store. The App is free to download and allows users to search products created by the NBY community and purchase items from the online store. The iD Studio Finder allows the user to find out exactly where the Nike By You Studios are located, and how to book an appointment with a design consultant. Users could also save their designs to their myLocker accounts. The app has since been discontinued and replaced with a Mobile Builder engineered to allow for full customization from any modern mobile device running either the iOS or Android operating system.

=== Nike PHOTOiD ===
By taking a picture with their phone, consumers can send an image to Nike, where newly designed software will then analyze the picture for its two main colors and then go about designing a shoe based on it. The consumer will then receive reply with an image of their desired shoe. From this stage, they can either save the image, send it to someone else or even purchase the new design.

== Events ==
=== Campaigns ===
Nike By You launched a billboard campaign coinciding with the re-launch of the service website. The Reuters sign in Times Square and offered passersby the option to use their phones to customize a pair of shoes. Once the user has then customized the pair of shoes they receive a text with a wallpaper of the shoe and then given the option to purchase their customized shoe.

=== Celebrity designs ===
Nike By You has invited celebrities such as Amani Toomer and DJ Clark Kent to go into the Nike By You bespoke workshop, situated in 21 Mercer Street, New York and design their own shoe.

=== Nike Air Troupe Design Battle ===
When Nike launched a brand new shoe specifically designed for hip hop dancers. This campaign was designed to promote both Nike By You and the new shoe. It allowed users to customize their own Nike Air Troupe shoe and then to submit their design into a competition against other designers. Designs would go through rounds of voting until the best designs were chosen, and winners could win various prizes. The competition ended on April 16, 2009.

== Similar services ==
Other clothing brands also offer bespoke clothing for customers. Vans, for example, offer a similar customized shoe experience for customers. It recently added bookbags, and hats along with shoes. Adidas offer a bespoke service called mi adidas allowing customized shoe features for customers. Reebok also offer a service called Your Reebok. Converse, a Nike company, offers the Converse Create service, which runs on an adapted version of the Nike By You software. Franklin Sports offers custom batting gloves.
