= Roger Twibell =

American sportscaster

Roger Claude Twibell is an American sportscaster, who most recently called Arkansas State Red Wolves football broadcasts on ESPN+ in 2018.

He has worked at ABC, ESPN, CBS Sports Network and the Big Ten Network. He also works on pre-season games for the Kansas City Chiefs.

In 2019, he served as a commentator for the international broadcast of the Masters Tournament.

== Biography ==
Twibell's television career began as a sportscaster at KGUN-TV in Tucson, Ariz. In 1973, he moved to KATU-TV in Portland, Oregon, where he worked the sports desk and did play-by-play for Oregon State football and basketball. He also broadcast local hockey, and track and field.

Twibell moved to Dallas’ KDFW-TV in 1975 before going to Miami's WTVJ-TV the following year, where he did nightly sportscasts and Dolphins’ preseason and Fort Lauderdale Strikers play-by-play.

In 1978, he joined Boston's WBZ-TV, handling nightly sportscasts and play-by-play of the Boston Celtics. He also did New England Patriots preseason games, the Boston Marathon and New England Teamen soccer games. Twibell also hosted a weekly in-season Patriots show.

In his three years at WBZ-TV, Twibell was voted the best play-by-play announcer in New England by the Associated Press, won a New England Emmy for play-by-play and received Syracuse University's Phillips Award as the best nightly sportscaster.

He also worked as the host of The Morning Drive with Roger Twibell with Jeff McCarragher and as host of the 610 Morning Rush with Josh Klingler on KCSP 610 Kansas City from January 4, 2008, till January 1, 2010. He was replaced by "Bulldog" Bob Fescoe, who had been on KFNS, WHB and KMBZ.

Twibell attended the University of Arizona to play football and baseball, but after suffering career-ending knee injuries, he transferred to the University of Kansas where he graduated in 1972.

A native of Shawnee Mission, Kansas, Twibell lives with his three children Taylor, Conor, and Morgan.
