= ESPN+ =

On-demand sports streaming service

- Website type: Sports programming brand (formerly OTT streaming service)
- Headquarters: ESPN Plaza, 935 Middle Street, Bristol, Connecticut, United States
- Area served: United States
- Owner: ESPN
- Website: plus.espn.com
- Users: 24.1 million (June 2025; former streaming service)
- Launched: April 12, 2018; 8 years ago
- Current status: Active as a programming brand; standalone subscription replaced by ESPN Select on August 21, 2025

ESPN+ is an American sports programming brand owned by ESPN, formerly operating as a standalone subscription streaming service from 2018 to 2025. Since August 2025, its programming has been available on the ESPN direct-to-consumer streaming service through the ESPN Select and ESPN Unlimited subscription plans.

ESPN+ launched on April 12, 2018, using technology developed by Disney subsidiary BAMTech, now known as Disney Streaming. Originally marketed as a supplement to ESPN's traditional television networks, the service offered exclusive sports programming, including content previously available to cable subscribers through ESPN3 and the ESPN app. However, an ESPN+ subscription did not provide access to ESPN's linear channels or other content requiring television provider authentication, meaning that some of ESPN's sports rights were unavailable through the service.

ESPN+ programming includes college sports, hockey (including exclusive National Hockey League games and out-of-market coverage), soccer, golf (including PGA Tour Live and the PGA Championship), tennis, cricket and other sports. The service previously carried Ultimate Fighting Championship (UFC) events, including exclusive pay-per-view coverage in the United States, until the organization's broadcasting rights moved to Paramount+ in 2026. Its library also features archived sporting events, ESPN original documentaries and premium content from ESPN.com. MLB.TV, Major League Baseball's out-of-market streaming package, is available separately as an add-on through ESPN Unlimited.

On August 21, 2025, ESPN+ was integrated into ESPN's newly launched direct-to-consumer streaming service, with its existing subscription offering rebranded as ESPN Select. The ESPN+ content library became available through both ESPN Select and the broader ESPN Unlimited plan, which also provides access to ESPN's linear networks and other streaming services. ESPN retained the ESPN+ name as a programming brand, partly due to existing contractual obligations with content providers. ESPN+ also continues to be offered to commercial establishments through a separately licensed package distributed by EverPass Media.

== History ==
In August 2016, the Walt Disney Company acquired a minority stake in BAMTech, a spin-out of MLB Advanced Media's streaming technology business, for $1 billion, with an option to acquire a majority stake in the future. It was also announced that Disney subsidiary ESPN was planning to develop an over-the-top service based on BAMTech technology as "an exploratory OTT project", drawing primarily from ESPN-owned rights for events not broadcast on television. ESPN already used BAMTech's platform for its TV Everywhere service WatchESPN. Disney CEO Bob Iger remarked that despite declines in the pay television industry due to cord-cutting, "live sports has really thrived, even in a world where there's so much more for people to do and to watch."

In August 2017, Disney invoked its option to acquire a controlling stake in BAMTech, and announced that it planned to launch its ESPN OTT service in 2018, followed by a Disney entertainment OTT service in 2019 (thus ending its relationship with Netflix). At this time, Disney stated that the new ESPN service would draw from ESPN-owned sports rights, as well as MLB, NHL and MLS content (although lacking major ESPN-owned rights such as the NBA and NFL), and that an accompanying redesign of the ESPN app would make it a "premier digital destination" for sports content. During Disney's fourth-quarter earnings call, Iger revealed that the service would be known as ESPN+. In December 2017, Disney announced its intent to acquire 21st Century Fox after the spin-off of certain businesses. The deal was to include the Fox Sports Networks group of regional sports networks (which Disney was ordered to divest under antitrust grounds), which led to suggestions that Disney wanted to incorporate FSN's regional sports rights into the service.

In February 2018, Iger stated that ESPN was aiming for a monthly price of $4.99. ESPN+ and BAMTech were placed into the newly formed Disney business segment, Disney Direct-to-Consumer and International, on March 14, 2018. On April 2, 2018, ESPN announced that ESPN+ would officially launch on April 12, 2018, and confirmed its $4.99 per-month pricing.

On August 21, 2018, ESPN.com's existing subscription service ESPN Insider was discontinued and folded into ESPN+, adding its premium web content (such as exclusive beat reports, and advanced sports statistics, analytics and fantasy sports tools) to the service. Both services shared the same monthly price, but ESPN Insider subscribers continued to receive the complimentary subscription to ESPN The Magazine that was included (until its discontinuation in September 2019), and annual subscribers were grandfathered under its previous $39.99-per-year price (as opposed to $49.99 for ESPN+).

On October 31, 2018, ESPN executive Russell Wolff was named executive vice president and general manager. In October 2019, ESPN+ began to add pre-roll advertising to on-demand content on the service. Concurrent with the launch of Disney+ on November 12, 2019, the Disney Bundle was introduced, allowing users to subscribe to ESPN+, Disney+ and the ad-supported tier of Hulu for $12.99 per month.

On October 22, 2020, it was announced that a larger amount of ESPN.com articles (primarily analysis) would become paywalled behind ESPN+. It was also announced that video simulcasts of the ESPN Radio programs The Dan Le Batard Show, Greeny, The Max Kellerman Show and Chiney & Golic Jr., as well as Jorge Ramos y Su Banda, would be moved exclusively to ESPN+ from the ESPN networks.

In March 2021, ESPN+ programming became available via the Hulu website and apps for those who are subscribed to both services, via a branded "ESPN+ on Hulu" hub.

In July 2022, Disney announced that the standalone monthly price of ESPN+, which reached $6.99 per month in 2021 following two smaller increases, would jump by three dollars, or 43%, to $9.99 per month beginning in late August. Observers speculated that the increase was intended to promote uptake of the Disney Bundle, which continued at the then current $13.99 price point, while remaining competitive relative to other standalone sports streaming services.

Following a carriage agreement with Spectrum in September 2023, ESPN+ became available to Spectrum TV Select Plus subscribers at no additional charge; the agreement was also stated to include distribution rights to a future ESPN "flagship" streaming service, expected to launch in 2025, which would be a superset of both ESPN+ and the programming exclusive to ESPN's linear networks.

In December 2024, ESPN+ programming became available via the Disney+ website and apps for those who are subscribed to the services, via a branded ESPN hub; the hub also includes ESPN programming simulcast on Hulu.

In May 2025, Disney announced that the ESPN+ service would be effectively subsumed by the new ESPN direct-to-consumer streaming service, with existing subscribers automatically becoming subscribers to the "Select" tier of the new ESPN DTC service. However, ESPN+ will remain separately active for an unspecified period of time due to contractual obligations with certain content providers, including Bundesliga, La Liga, and the UFC.

== Programming ==
=== History of programming ===
ESPN+ initially focused on overflow content, similar to that of ESPN3 (which is distributed through TV Everywhere to subscribers of participating internet and television providers). Some of ESPN3's content has since moved to ESPN+, and has since been incorporated more extensively into ESPN's later media rights deals.

Its launch content included boxing (including Top Rank events and archive content through 2025, and includes 36 exclusive fight cards), college sports events (including Ivy League events), outer court coverage of Tennis Grand Slams, international cricket (India national cricket team, Cricket Ireland and New Zealand Cricket), soccer (notably including Major League Soccer, the United Soccer League, the U.S. Open Cup, 2019 Copa America, the English Football League and the EFL Cup, Serie A and Eredivisie) and College Rugby. In October 2018, ESPN+ obtained the rights for the Swedish Allsvenskan and the Danish Superliga, declaring their intent to broadcast one match per week for each league. In February 2021, ESPN+ obtained the rights for the Belgian Pro League, and are expected to broadcast 3 matches per week.

ESPN+ featured out-of-market Major League Soccer matches at no additional charge for subscribers until 2023, when all matches moved to MLS Season Pass without blackouts, and the service held exclusive rights to all regionally televised Chicago Fire matches through 2020. Beginning in 2020, ESPN+ aired all matches of the German Bundesliga soccer league under a six-year deal.

PGA Tour Live (which was also run by Disney Streaming) was included for the 2018 PGA Tour season, but moved to NBC Sports Gold in 2019. ESPN+ will offer supplemental feeds during the PGA Championship beginning 2020, including during CBS broadcast windows. In 2022, PGA Tour Live returned to ESPN+ as part of a new long-term deal through 2030.

In March 2019, the American Athletic Conference announced a 12-year media rights deal with ESPN, under which ESPN+ will carry the majority of events not aired by ESPN's linear channels.

In May 2019, it was announced that ESPN+ would carry 18 World TeamTennis matches.

In the 2019–20 season, ESPN+ acquired the third-tier media rights for all but two Big 12 Conference teams; these telecasts are carried under the branding Big 12 Now. In May 2022, ESPN announced its acquisition of the third-tier media rights to Oklahoma Sooners athletics; the events will be carried on ESPN+ under the "SoonerVision on ESPN+" branding, and will include one exclusive football game per-season. The deal excluded the Texas Longhorns—who have an existing agreement with ESPN and IMG College to run Longhorn Network. The Big 12's third-tier media rights were eliminated in 2022 under new media rights negotiations with ESPN and Fox Sports.

During the 2020 Major League Baseball season's Wild Card Series round, ESPN+ aired Squeeze Play—which featured live look-ins and analysis of the seven series ESPN held rights to, in a similar manner to the ESPN Bases Loaded service it offered during the NCAA baseball tournament, as well as Statcast broadcasts of selected games.

On March 10, 2021, ESPN acquired rights to the National Hockey League under a new seven-year deal beginning in the 2021–22 season. Under this contract, ESPN+ holds exclusive rights to at least 50 games per-season which are also available on Hulu, simulcast rights to select ESPN games and transmission of all games on ABC (including the NHL All-Star Game and the Stanley Cup Final in selected seasons). ESPN+ also streams all out-of-market games under the "NHL Power Play" branding.

As part of ESPN's renewal of its rights to the NFL, ESPN+ gained simulcast rights to Monday Night Football broadcasts beginning in the 2021 NFL season. From 2022 to 2024, ESPN+ held exclusive rights to one game per season, which were moved back to ESPN linear networks in 2025 and to NFL Network from 2026 onward.

In September 2021, Disney began to shut down the U.S. version of Hotstar, a streaming service targeting Indian Americans, and migrated its content to ESPN+ and Hulu. This included its rights to home matches of the India national cricket team and Indian Premier League which had been sub-licensed to ESPN+ via its former sister network Star Sports.

On April 8, 2022, ESPN announced a deal with the Savannah Bananas to livestream two games of their Banana Ball World Tour on April 8 and 9.

In May 2022, ESPN announced a rights agreement with the Northwoods League to stream select games of their 2022 season each day exclusively on ESPN+, along with the Northwoods League All-Star Game, the Major League Dreams Showcase, the League playoffs and Summer Collegiate World Series.

=== UFC ===
In May 2018, the Ultimate Fighting Championship (UFC) announced new five-year digital and linear television rights deals with ESPN, effective January 2019. 20 UFC on ESPN+ Fight Night cards per year are streamed exclusively by the service, as well as preliminaries for 10 UFC on ESPN Fight Night cards per year. ESPN+ will also hold rights to supplemental content such as Dana White's Contender Series, archive content and PPV encores, and offer sales of UFC Fight Pass within the platform. The first ESPN+ event, UFC Fight Night: Cejudo vs. Dillashaw, generated 525,000 new subscribers on the day of the event alone.

On March 18, 2019, it was announced that ESPN had reached a two-year extension of its contract with the UFC. Beginning with UFC 236, ESPN+ became the exclusive U.S. distributor of all UFC pay-per-view events for residential customers; they are no longer sold through television providers, and viewers must have an ESPN+ subscription in order to buy them.

The package moved to Paramount+ and CBS in 2026, including the end of pay-per-view content altogether.

=== Current rights ===
==== Cricket ====
- National teams
  - West Indies national cricket team
  - New Zealand national cricket team (home match rights until 2026)
- T20 leagues
  - New Zealand's Super Smash
- Other
  - Super50 Cup
  - Women's Super50 Cup

==== Association football (soccer) ====
===== United States =====
- USL Championship
- USL League One
- USL Cup
- NCAA soccer

===== Canada =====
- Northern Super League

Spain

- La Liga
- Segunda División
- Copa del Rey
- Supercopa de España
- Copa De La Renia
- Supercopa de España Femenina

England

- FA Cup
- FA Community Shield
- Women's Super League
- Women's FA Cup
- Women's FA Community Shield

Netherlands

- Eredivisie
- KNVB Cup

===== Other =====
- Australian A-League Men
- Australian A-League Women
- CONCACAF W Champions Cup (Spanish)
- Scottish Cup

==== Baseball ====
- College World Series
- Little League World Series
- Caribbean Series (Spanish)

==== American Football ====
- United Football League
  - Simulcast of all UFL games carried on ABC, ESPN or ESPN2

==== Basketball ====
- FIBA Basketball World Cup
- FIBA Women's Basketball World Cup
- WNBA
- NBA Summer League
- NBA G League

==== Combat sports ====
- Professional Fighters League (2024–2026)

==== Golf ====
- Masters Tournament
  - Masters Live supplemental feeds
  - Masters Tournament official films library on-demand
- PGA Championship
  - Supplemental feeds.
  - PGA Championship official films library on-demand
- PGA Tour
  - PGA Tour Live supplemental coverage.
- LPGA Tour
- TGL

==== Ice hockey ====
- National Hockey League
  - At least 50 exclusive regular season games per-season. Games are also available on Hulu and Disney+.
  - All out-of-market games, and on-demand replays of all nationally televised games (under the NHL Power Play on ESPN+ branding)
- Ice Hockey World Championships
- IIHF World Junior Championship
- IIHF World U18 Championship
- Hockey East
- ECAC Hockey

==== Lacrosse ====
- World Lacrosse Championship
- National Lacrosse League
- Premier Lacrosse League

==== Rugby Union ====
- Major League Rugby

==== Surf ====
- World Surf League

==== Tennis ====
- U.S. Open
- Australian Open
- Wimbledon

==== Yachting ====
- America's Cup
  - Match Cup
  - Louis Vuitton Cup
  - Women's America's Cup
  - Youth America's Cup

==== Others ====
- Red Bull Cliff Diving World Series

==== College sports ====
===== American football =====
====== FBS ======
- American Athletic Conference
  - Events not carried on ESPN linear networks
- Atlantic Coast Conference
  - Events carried on ACCNX are also carried on ESPN+
- Big 12 Conference
  - Third-tier media rights to most Big 12 teams (under the Big 12 Now)
- Conference USA
- Mid-American Conference
- Southeastern Conference
  - Events carried on SECN+ are also carried on ESPN+
- Sun Belt Conference

====== FCS ======
- Big Sky Conference
- Ivy League
- Mid-Eastern Athletic Conference
- Missouri Valley Football Conference
- Northeast Conference
- OVC–Big South Football Association
- Patriot League
- Southern Conference
- Southland Conference
- Southwestern Athletic Conference
- United Athletic Conference

====== Division II ======
- Championship tournament

====== Division III ======
- Championship tournament

==== Basketball and other sports ====
- American Athletic Conference
- America East Conference
- Atlantic 10 Conference
- Atlantic Coast Conference
- ASUN Conference
- Big 12 Conference
- Big East Conference
- Big Sky Conference
- Big South Conference
- Big West Conference
- Conference USA
- Horizon League
- Ivy League
- Metro Atlantic Athletic Conference
- Mid-American Conference
- Mid-Eastern Athletic Conference
- Missouri Valley Conference
- Northeast Conference
- Ohio Valley Conference
- Patriot League
- Southeastern Conference
- Southern Conference
- Southland Conference
- Southwestern Athletic Conference
- Sun Belt Conference
- West Coast Conference
- Western Athletic Conference

===== National Collegiate Athletic Association (NCAA) =====
- National Invitation Tournament
- Women's Basketball Invitation Tournament
- NCAA Division I baseball tournament
- NCAA Division I softball tournament
- NCAA women's gymnastics tournament
- NCAA men's gymnastics championships
- NCAA Division I women's volleyball tournament
- NCAA men's volleyball tournament
- NCAA Division I Football Championship Subdivision
- NCAA Division I men's lacrosse tournament
- NCAA Division I women's lacrosse tournament
- NCAA Division I men's ice hockey tournament
- NCAA women's ice hockey tournament
- Other NCAA tournaments

=== Original programming ===
ESPN+ also carries ESPN original programming and documentaries, such as the 30 for 30 franchise (with some premiering on ESPN+ prior to their premiere on ESPN), and exclusive original series and studio programs:

- Detail – A franchise of programs featuring analysis of sports by associated players. The initial, basketball version of the series was hosted and produced by Kobe Bryant until his death in January 2020. In October 2018, ESPN announced that Peyton Manning would host an NFL version of the program. On June 29, 2019, ESPN announced a mixed martial arts version of the program hosted by Daniel Cormier. Golden State Warriors head coach and former Chicago Bulls player Steve Kerr, along with former Bulls coach Phil Jackson, hosted special episodes focused on the Michael Jordan-led Bulls dynasty in the 1990s, as a tie-in for the ESPN documentary miniseries The Last Dance.
- ESPN FC – A studio program focusing on soccer; it moved from airing on the networks to exclusively being on ESPN+.
- In The Crease – a daily Stanley Cup playoffs highlight and discussion show hosted by Arda Ocal
- Quest for the Stanley Cup – A documentary series following the Stanley Cup playoffs (moved from Showtime)
- Last Train to Russia – A documentary series previewing the 2018 FIFA World Cup
- Year One – A documentary series following the 2017–18 NBA rookie class, featuring Jayson Tatum, Ben Simmons and Donovan Mitchell
- MLS Rewind – A weekly recap of Major League Soccer action, hosted by Taylor Twellman and featuring analysis from Alejandro Moreno
- I'll Take That Bet – A series focusing on sports betting, in conjunction with The Action Network
- Ariel and the Bad Guy – A weekly mixed martial arts discussion show hosted by Ariel Helwani and Chael Sonnen
- The Fantasy Show – A fantasy football analysis show hosted by Matthew Berry. Originally aired on ESPN2 in its first season.
- Always Late with Katie Nolan – A late-night talk show-inspired series hosted by Katie Nolan, serving as a successor to her previous Fox Sports 1 program Garbage Time. The start of its second season in late September 2019 saw it carried on ESPN2 on Thursday evenings as well. The series was cancelled in 2020.
- Peyton's Places – A documentary series hosted by former NFL quarterback Peyton Manning. The franchise expanded to include spin-offs hosted by Eli Manning (college football), Abby Wambach (soccer), Vince Carter (basketball), John McEnroe (tennis) and Ronda Rousey (combat sports).
- NFL PrimeTime – Hosted by Chris Berman and Tom Jackson, a digital-only version of the popular NFL highlight show that aired on ESPN for nearly 30 years. The program airs live at 7:30 p.m. on Sunday nights during the regular season, recapping the afternoon's games. The show is updated with segments recapping the Sunday and Monday-night games after their completion, which are respectively hosted by Scott Van Pelt, Steve Levy and, previously, Joe Tessitore.
- Miles to Go – a documentary series following Les Miles, coach of the Kansas Jayhawks football team.
- Fútbol Americas – A breakdown and analysis of soccer from a North American perspective, with highlights from North American leagues (mostly MLS, Liga MX and NWSL), as well as national teams, CONCACAF competitions and North American players playing abroad in Europe. Hosted by Sebastian Salazar and Herculez Gomez, with new episodes every Monday and Thursday.
- The Breakdown with Peyton and Belichick - Hosted by Peyton Manning and Bill Belichick, a breakdown and analysis of upcoming Monday Night Football games during the NFL season. New episodes premiere during weeks when the MNF game features the Manningcast.

=== Other programming ===
- In the 2019 Formula One season, ESPN+ began to carry Sky Sports F1's studio shows Pit Lane Live and Welcome To the Weekend.

== ESPN+ for Business ==
In January 2021, Joe Hand Promotions began offering a commercial subscription of ESPN+ for Business, a version of ESPN+ that offers limited live sports content via DirecTV to commercial establishments. In 2023, the commercial service was expanded to include college sports.

In September 2025, ESPN announced it was making ESPN+ available as a standalone streaming package for commercial establishments via EverPass Media.

== See also ==
- List of streaming media services
- ABC app
- Disney+
- Hulu
