= Fútbol Americas =

Fútbol Americas is a soccer television show that streams live on ESPN+.On March 4, 2021, ESPN announced that a new studio show, Fútbol Americas, would first air on March 8, 2021 on ESPN+. It is hosted by Cristina Alexander and Herculez Gomez.

According to The Athletic, 'the energetic bi-weekly program focuses on U.S. and Mexico-based men’s and women’s soccer coverage, equal focus on Mexico’s top players and the budding generation of American men who are playing in Europe, Major League Soccer and Liga MX, which is the most watched soccer league in the States.'

In late 2023, Futbol Americas also began broadcasting on ESPN Caribbean.

In July 2024, Futbol W, a spin-off show focusing on women's soccer launched starring U.S. World Cup winner Ali Krieger.

== History ==
On March 4, 2021, ESPN announced that a new studio show, Fútbol Americas, would first air on March 8, 2021 on ESPN+.

In February 2022, Felipe Cardenas of The Athletic wrote: 'It’s early days, but Futbol Americas has quickly become a part of American soccer culture. It’s a show that truly has a bit of everything.'

In May 2022, Futbol Americas produced a 'whip around show' for the Lamar Hunt U.S. Open Cup. According to USA Today, the show 'seemed to achieve something bordering on the impossible in the social media age: Everyone loved it'.

Futbol Americas broadcast a live, daily show for ESPN from the 2022 FIFA World Cup in Qatar.

In 2023, Futbol Americas won a Telly Award (Silver Winner) in the Television, General-Sports category.

Futbol Americas celebrated its 300th episode on November 9, 2023 from NWSL Championship Media Day in San Diego, CA. Guests included Ali Krieger, Megan Rapinoe, Lynn Williams and Rose Lavelle.

In July of 2024, ESPN launched Futbol W, a show dedicated entirely to women's soccer. It airs Tuesdays on ESPN+.

On December 19, 2024, co-host and show creator Sebastian Salazar announced he was stepping away from full-time hosting duties. Cristina Alexander replaced Salazar as the host of both Futbol Americas and Futbol W.

== Programming ==
Fútbol Americas is broadcast live on ESPN+ on Mondays and Thursdays at 8:30 p.m. ET/5:30 p.m. PT. It airs at midnight local time on ESPN Caribbean on Monday and Thursday nights.

The show focuses specifically on soccer in CONCACAF including the U.S. men's and women's national teams, MLS, Liga MX, NWSL, USL and the Mexico men's national football team.

The show also highlights CONCACAF players playing in Europe or abroad.

=== Additional hosts/guests ===
Since the start of the show, many players from across CONCACAF teams have been interviewed on Futbol Americas. Christian Pulisic, Guillermo Ochoa, Alex Morgan, Javier 'Chicharito' Hernandez, Alphonso Davies, and Leon Bailey have all appeared on the show.

In addition, Julie Foudy has appeared on numerous occasions to provide insight about the National Women's Soccer League and U.S. women's national team. Current Orlando Pride player Ali Krieger has also appeared on the show multiple times to discuss women's soccer.

Mauricio Pedroza and Alexis Nunes have also appeared as hosts, replacing Cristina Alexander when needed.
