= Steve Cangialosi =

American television sports broadcaster (born 1963)

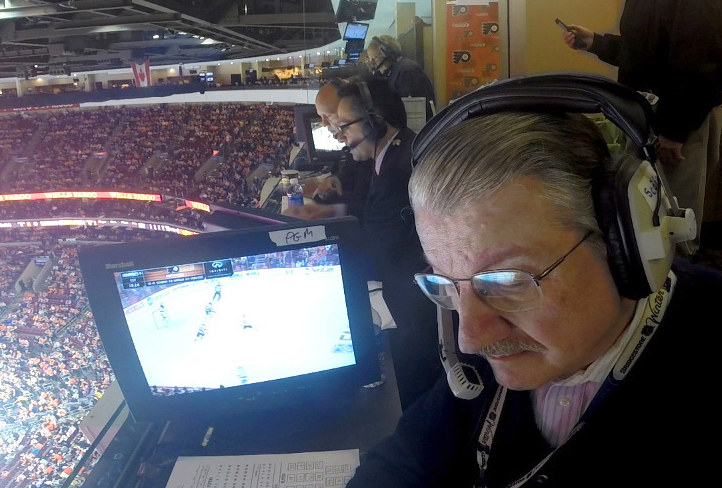

Steven Donato Cangialosi (born October 28, 1963) is a television sports broadcaster who serves as play-by-play announcer for Major League Soccer matches on Apple TV+. He was previously the New York Red Bulls' announcer on the MSG Network, and also has announced for soccer matches for ESPN.

In addition to soccer matches, Cangialosi was also the play-by-play announcer for the New Jersey Devils hockey team where he did calls for the team from 2011 to 2022. Cangialosi replaced Mike "Doc" Emrick as the television voice of the Devils when Emrick stepped down after 21 seasons in 2011. He served with color analyst and former NHL defenseman Ken Daneyko after working for three seasons with former NHL goaltender Chico Resch. Prior to this, Cangialosi served as the backup play-by-play announcer to Emrick and the primary studio host for pre/post and intermission studio shows. He has also had other various jobs in television and radio including a three-year run as a sports talk-show host on ESPN radio in New York City. Steve Cangialosi worked on his first Olympic Games at the London 2012 event, broadcasting several soccer matches.

Cangialosi worked on Red Bulls games with color analyst and former New York Cosmos goalkeeper Shep Messing and also occasionally worked on international soccer matches for beIN Sports, Fox Sports and NBC Sports, where he has broadcast several Olympic, Gold Cup, and Europa League soccer matches.

== Broadcasting career ==
Cangialosi began his broadcasting career at Sports Phone, a dial-in sports score service, while he was still attending college in 1984. After he spent a year as the sports editor at WNEW-FM, he worked in a similar capacity from 1987 to 1992 at WINS, where he was the station's youngest on-air reporter. He joined NY1 in August 1992 as one of the channel's original on-air personalities. He was the host of New York Sports on 1 during his eight years at NY1 until 2000. He concurrently was a talk-show host and sportscaster at ESPN Radio from 1997 to 2000. He also called soccer matches for Bein Sport. Cangialosi broadcasts hockey and soccer for ONE World Sports. Since 2016, he sporadically worked for ESPN on MLS and Serie A matches.

On May 17, 2022, Cangialosi announced that he would step down as the play-by-play announcer of the New Jersey Devils on the MSG Network. He continued doing play-by-play for the New York Red Bulls though the 2022 season. He was succeeded by Bill Spaulding who called play-by-play for the Devils for three years beginning with the 2022-23 season.

== Personal ==
A Queens native, Cangialosi was raised in South Ozone Park. He is the second of Victor and Rose Cangialosi's three sons. His father was a photographic technician at Authentic Color in New York City. After graduating from John Adams High School, Cangialosi earned a Bachelor of Arts in Journalism from New York University in 1985. He is the son-in-law of Robert Ivers.
