= Stewart Robson =

English footballer (born 1964)

Personal information
- Full name: Stewart Ian Robson
- Date of birth: 6 November 1964 (age 62)
- Place of birth: Billericay, England
- Height: 5 ft 11 in (1.80 m)
- Position: Midfielder

Youth career
- 1978–1981: Arsenal

Senior career*
Years	Team	Apps	(Gls)
1981–1987	Arsenal	150	(16)
1987–1991	West Ham United	69	(4)
1991–1995	Coventry City	57	(3)
Total		276	(23)

International career
1981–1982	England Youth	10	(2)
1981	England U20	6	(0)
1984–1988	England U21	8	(2)

Managerial career
- 2003: Southend United (caretaker)
- * Club domestic league appearances and goals

Stewart Ian Robson (born 6 November 1964) is an English former football player and TV, radio and podcast football pundit. He played for Arsenal, West Ham United where he was their player of the season in 1988, and Coventry City. After his footballing career ended he took on a role as a TV and radio pundit for Arsenal TV until 2012, ESPN, Talksport and TNT Sports. He is currently ESPN's lead color commentator for FA Cup and EFL Cup working alongside Jon Champion and Martin Tyler (world feed), and Bundesliga with Derek Rae, who he also provides commentary alongside in the FIFA/EA FC video game series since 2021.

== Career ==
=== Arsenal ===
Born in Billericay, Essex, he was educated at Alleyn Court Prep School in Westcliff on Sea and Brentwood School. Robson joined Arsenal as a schoolboy in 1978. He made his debut soon after his 17th birthday, on 5 December 1981 against West Ham United, and became a regular player in the Arsenal side under manager Terry Neill and his eventual successor Don Howe.

Robson showed great promise as a young footballer, both in his versatility (although he usually played in midfield, he was equally adept in defence as full back or centre back) and his competitiveness; he was an enthusiastic runner and tackler. He was the Arsenal's 1985 Player of the Year, and made the England senior squad. Then an injury in the cup tie against Rotherham on 25 January 1986 wrecked his season. He was out for over two months with groin trouble, and missed his England call up, and that probably cost him a place in the World Cup, and was on the stand by-list.

After the arrival of George Graham as manager in May 1986, Robson found himself out of the Arsenal side, only playing five matches of the 1986–87 season, before losing his place to Steve Williams. Leaving in January 1987, he had played 186 matches for Arsenal, scoring 21 goals.

=== West Ham United ===
He was sold to West Ham United in January 1987 for £700,000. His time with West Ham was plagued with injuries, particularly to his pelvis. Manager John Lyall later revealed that Robson had been on the treatment table at Highbury when he had signed him and he was rarely fully fit for the Hammers. His first West Ham game was on 24 January 1987 in a 3–1 away win at Coventry City. He remained a regular in the Hammers' first team for two and a half years, and Player of the Year for 1988. However, lost his place after they were relegated in 1989, playing only eight league games in the following two years following a succession of injuries to his pelvic area. His last game was a 6–1 FA Cup defeat of Aldershot on 16 January 1991.

=== Coventry City ===
In March 1991, Terry Butcher signed Robson for Coventry City on a free transfer. He helped them stay in the First Division and become founder members of the FA Premier League in 1992–93. Robson went on to make 57 league appearances for the Sky Blues, but once again, injury ruined his spell at the club; he suffered a bad knee injury playing his old club Arsenal at the start of the 1993–94 season. In the summer of 1995, Robson announced his retirement citing a history of injuries; he had just spent the entire season sidelined due to injury.

== Coaching career ==
Robson later joined Wimbledon as a youth coach, eventually moving up the ranks to become reserve team manager and then first-team coach until leaving in December 2001. In 2003, he spent a short spell as first-team coach and as caretaker manager at Southend United between 25 March 2003 and 18 April 2003. In 2004, he joined Rushden & Diamonds as technical director of football.

Robson also played cricket for Coventry and for North Warwickshire.

== Media career ==
Robson has teamed up with Martin Tyler as the commentary duo for the non-UK international feed of the FA Cup and the UEFA Champions League. He worked for Arsenal TV as co-commentator. He commentated for BT Sport for the 2012 African Cup of Nations. He has also appeared on Absolute Radio's Rock'n'Roll Football alongside Jim Proudfoot. Robson is a regular contributor on the football podcast released by The Times in conjunction with their weekly football supplement The Game. He has also presented on Talksport. He also works for BT Sport as a co-commentator for UEFA Champions League, UEFA Europa League, Bundesliga, and Serie A. For the 2014 FIFA World Cup and UEFA Euro 2016, Robson partnered with Jon Champion and with Ian Darke on Euro 2020 for ESPN's coverage in the United States. He now serves as the lead color commentator for FA Cup and EFL matches on ESPN alongside Champion and Tyler. He also commentates on La Liga and Bundesliga for ESPN with Rob Palmer and Derek Rae.

Robson has been consistently critical of former Arsenal manager Arsène Wenger. Robson also regularly appears on ESPN FC, which airs on ESPN in the US and on BT Sport in the UK.

In 2021, Robson became the primary co-commentator of the EA Sports video games, FIFA 22, FIFA 23 and EA FC 24.

== Managerial statistics ==
As of 8 June 2013

Team	From	To	Record				
Team	From	To	G	W	D	L	Win %
Southend United	25 March 2003	18 April 2003	3	1	0	2	33.33
Total			3	1	0	2	33.33

== Honours ==
- Arsenal Player of the Season: 1984−85
- Football League First Division Team of the Year: 1985–86
- West Ham United FC Player of the Year: 1988
- Coventry City FC Player of the Year: 1992
