= Seamus Malin =

Irish football commentator

Seamus Malin (born September 3, 1940 in Dublin, Ireland) is an Irish former journalist for ESPN. Malin most often commentated on soccer events, such as the UEFA Champions League and World Cup.

He also worked with the NASL's Boston Minutemen and New York Cosmos. He also called World Cup matches for NBC, ABC, and Turner Network Television, plus matches on CBS when the network had NASL rights.

In 2005, he was inducted into the National Soccer Hall of Fame as a media representative.

Malin is a graduate of Harvard University. At one time, he served in the school's admissions department.
