= Janusz Michallik =

Soccer player, coach, and television sports commentator

Personal information
- Date of birth: April 22, 1966 (age 60)
- Place of birth: Chorzów, Poland
- Height: 5 ft 11 in (1.80 m)
- Position: Defender

Senior career*
Years	Team	Apps	(Gls)
1983	Gwardia Warszawa	10	(0)
1984–1985	Cleveland Force (indoor)		
1986–1987	Louisville Thunder (indoor)		
1987–1988	Canton Invaders (indoor)		
1990	Boston Bolts		
1990–1991	Atlanta Attack (indoor)		
1992	Gremio Lusitano		
1995	Connecticut Wolves		
1995	→ New York Centaurs (loan)		
1996–1997	Columbus Crew	42	(0)
1998	New England Revolution	12	(0)

International career
1991–1994	United States	44	(1)
Medal record
Representing United States
Winner	CONCACAF Gold Cup	1991
Men's Soccer
- * Club domestic league appearances and goals

Janusz Michallik (born April 22, 1966) is a former professional soccer player, coach, and current television sports commentator. Born in Poland, he played for the United States national team.

== Youth ==
Michallik moved to the United States with his father Krystian, a former Poland national team player, at the age of 16. His father had previously spent time in the U.S. in 1976 when he played for the Hartford Bicentennials of the North American Soccer League. While Michallik played in the Poland national youth team, he never played for the senior team, making him eligible for the U.S. team once he gained his citizenship.

== Professional ==
In 1983, Michallik began his professional career with Gwardia Warszawa. He played 10 games before his family moved to the U.S. In 1984, he signed with the Cleveland Force of the Major Indoor Soccer League (MISL) and played a single season with the team. He continued to play indoor soccer with his next two teams, the Louisville Thunder and Canton Invaders of the American Indoor Soccer Association (AISA), winning championships with them both despite only playing one season with each team. In 1988, he tried out with the Dallas Sidekicks of MISL, but while he played in the pre-season he was not offered a contract by the team. In 1990, Michallik moved to outdoor soccer with the Boston Bolts of the newly established American Professional Soccer League (APSL). In the fall of 1990, he signed with the Atlanta Attack of the AISA. In 1992, he played for the amateur Gremio Lusitano. In 1995, he signed with the Connecticut Wolves of USISL. He played several early season games with the Wolves, then went on loan to the New York Centaurs of the A-League.

In 1996, the Columbus Crew of Major League Soccer drafted Michallik in the 7th Round (61st overall) of the Inaugural MLS draft. He played two seasons with the Crew before signing with the New England Revolution on January 16, 1998, for whom he played one season before being released on October 31, 1998.

== National team ==
Michallik became a U.S. citizen on March 8, 1991. U.S. coach Bora Milutinovic quickly called him into the national team. That year, he was part of the team which won the 1991 CONCACAF championship. In August 1991, he signed a contract to play exclusively for the national team. In 1992, he tasted victory again when the U.S. team won that year's U.S. Cup. He went on to earn 44 caps and score a single goal as a tough defender. He was key to the U.S. preparation for the 1994 World Cup, playing in 12 pre-tournament games and starting in seven. As hosts of the 1994 World Cup, the United States qualified automatically, thus not having to qualify through the CONCACAF region's qualification tournament, and he was frequently summoned for friendlies, which he scored his first and only international goal for the United States in a 2–0 away triumph over Saudi Arabia in Riyadh. However, he was left off the roster for the tournament itself and retired from the national team later that year.

International goals

#	Date	Venue	Opponent	Score	Result	Competition
1.	April 9, 1993	King Fahd International Stadium, Riyadh, Saudi Arabia	Saudi Arabia	2–0	2–0	Friendly

=== Futsal ===
In 1995, Michallik earned five caps and scored 1 goal with the U.S. futsal team.

== Life after retirement ==
He currently lives in Glastonbury, Connecticut, with his wife, Marzena and son, Daniel, who played collegiate soccer for the DePaul Blue Demons. He is a soccer commentator, currently working for ESPN and SiriusXM. He is also an expert for the Polish Television, TVP Sport. He also is a frequent guest on Polish YouTube channel Kanał Sportowy.

== Honors ==
- In 2002, he was inducted into the Connecticut Soccer Hall of Fame
- In 2009, he was inducted into the New England Soccer Hall of Fame
