= Darrell Currie =

Scottish television presenter and journalist

- Born: 1982; Glasgow, Scotland
- Occupation(s): Sports reporter, journalist, presenter
- Employer(s): Viaplay; TNT Sports
- Known for: Host of TNT Sports
- Relatives: Mary Lee (grandmother)

Darrell Currie (born 1982) is a Scottish television presenter and journalist. He is currently a presenter and touchline reporter for TNT Sports where he covers English and Scottish football. He also is part of the ESPN football coverage team. In addition, Currie also works on the Scottish Cup coverage for Premier Sports.

== Early life ==
Born in Glasgow, Currie grew up in Bearsden, and is the grandson of singer Mary Lee. His brother, Adrian, is an actor. Currie was educated at the High School of Glasgow before attending the University of Manchester, where he gained a degree in business and economics. In his youth, he played rugby, training with the Sale Sharks. Currie got his first break in the media industry as a teenager, working on Radio Clyde as an afternoon runner.

== Career ==
Before joining BT Sport, Currie worked at numerous broadcasting corporations, including BBC Scotland and CNN International.

During his time with ESPN, Currie was the network's SPFL reporter. He also worked as a reporter for ESPN USA's Premier League coverage and contributed to ESPN USA's coverage of the 2010 FIFA World Cup and Euro 2012, working as a reporter.

He is currently BT Sport's lead SPFL presenter, and is usually joined by guests including Chris Sutton, Stephen Craigan, Ally McCoist, and Kevin Thomson. Currie also presents UEFA Europa League and UEFA Champions League coverage, as well as filling in for Jake Humphrey on BT's Premier League coverage.

== Personal life ==
Currie lives in London, with his wife, son and daughter.
