= Frank Leboeuf =

French actor, sports commentator, and former footballer (born 1968)

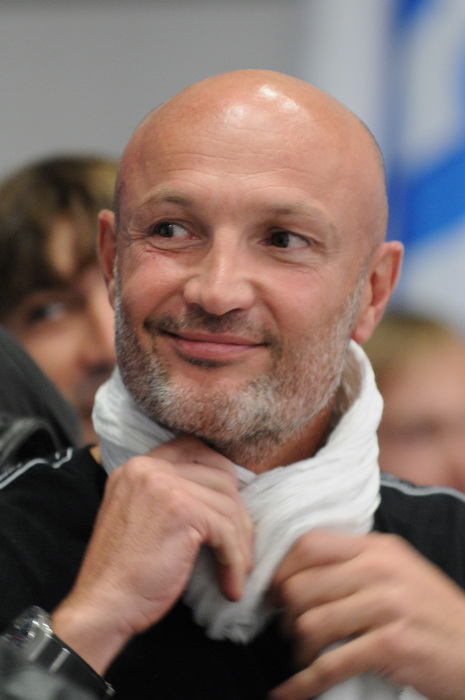
- Leboeuf in 2011

Personal information
- Full name: Frank Alain James Leboeuf
- Date of birth: 22 January 1968 (age 58)
- Place of birth: Marseille, France
- Height: 1.83 m (6 ft 0 in)
- Position: Centre-back

Youth career
- 1984–1986: Toulon
- 1986–1987: Hyères
- 1987–1988: Meaux

Senior career*
Years	Team	Apps	(Gls)
1988–1991	Laval	69	(11)
1991–1996	Strasbourg	189	(48)
1996–2001	Chelsea	144	(17)
2001–2003	Marseille	51	(5)
2003–2004	Al Sadd	17	(6)
2004–2005	Al Wakrah	10	(2)
2006–2007	Hollywood United		
Total		480	(89)

International career
1995–2002	France	50	(4)
Medal record
Men's football
Representing France
FIFA World Cup
Winner	1998
UEFA European Championship
Winner	2000
FIFA Confederations Cup
Winner	2001
- * Club domestic league appearances and goals

Frank Alain James Leboeuf (French pronunciation: [fʁɑ̃k ləbœf]) (Note: While the traditional French spellings of the first name and the surname are respectively Franck and Lebœuf, and some publications about the person observe either or both of those spellings, it is Frank Leboeuf that is most common even in French and that the person himself uses in his social media profiles.) (born 22 January 1968) is a French actor, sports commentator and former footballer who played as a centre-back. With the France national team, Leboeuf won the 1998 FIFA World Cup and UEFA Euro 2000 as well as a number of domestic trophies, most famously during his five years at Chelsea. Since the conclusion of his playing career, Leboeuf has transitioned to acting, appearing in stage, film productions and is a regular contributor at ESPN FC.

== Early life ==
Frank Alain James Leboeuf was born on 22 January 1968 in Marseille and raised in Saint-Cyr-sur-Mer.

== Club career ==
Leboeuf was introduced to football by his father, a former Rennes coach, who trained children in the sport. After starting his career in 1986 in the lower divisions of the French leagues, Leboeuf moved to Laval in 1988. In 1991, he moved to Strasbourg and played there until 1996, when he made a switch to English club Chelsea for £2.5m.

He played over 200 games for the club and scored 24 goals, mainly from penalties and set pieces. With Chelsea, he won two FA Cups, one League Cup, one Cup Winners' Cup and one UEFA Super Cup. He left in 2001 for club Marseille, before finishing out his career in Qatar. Despite his numerous accolades, Leboeuf never won a first-division title in Europe or the UEFA Champions League.

== International career ==
Leboeuf was capped 50 times for France, scoring four goals. His first two came on 6 September 1995 in a Euro 96 qualifier at home to Azerbaijan, contributing to a 10–0 win, a then-record for France. Although he was mainly a substitute in the 1998 World Cup (started 2 and played in 3 matches out of 7), he stepped in for red carded Laurent Blanc to play in the final, a 3–0 win against Brazil, a match in which he man-marked the highly rated striker Ronaldo.

In a Euro 2000 qualifier on 9 June 1999, Leboeuf scored the only goal from the penalty spot with five minutes to go as world champions France struggled away to amateurs Andorra. He received a winner's medal at the finals in Belgium and the Netherlands, though Blanc and Marcel Desailly were the preferred defensive partnership, including in the final.

He scored a late winner against co-hosts South Korea on 26 May ahead of the 2002 FIFA World Cup (3–2). Holders France were eliminated in the group stage in a shock, and he retired from the team.

=== International goals ===
Scores and results list France's goal tally first, score column indicates score after each Leboeuf goal.

List of international goals scored by Frank Leboeuf
No.	Date	Venue	Opponent	Score	Result	Competition
1	6 September 1995	Stade de l'Abbé-Deschamps, Auxerre, France	Azerbaijan	5–0	10–0	UEFA Euro 1996 qualifying
2	6 September 1995	Stade de l'Abbé-Deschamps, Auxerre, France	Azerbaijan	8–0	10–0	UEFA Euro 1996 qualifying
3	9 June 1999	Estadi Olímpic de Montjuïc, Barcelona, Spain	Andorra	1–0	1–0	UEFA Euro 2000 qualifying
4	26 May 2002	Suwon World Cup Stadium, Suwon, South Korea	South Korea	3–2	3–2	Friendly

== Style of play ==
A cultured centre-back, Leboeuf was noted for his intelligence, composure, and long range passing ability. He also had a powerful long range shot, and was a consistent penalty-taker throughout his career. He took 15 penalties in competitive games for Chelsea, missing just 2 times, and missing only 1 out of his 11 attempts from the spot in the Premier League.

== Acting ==
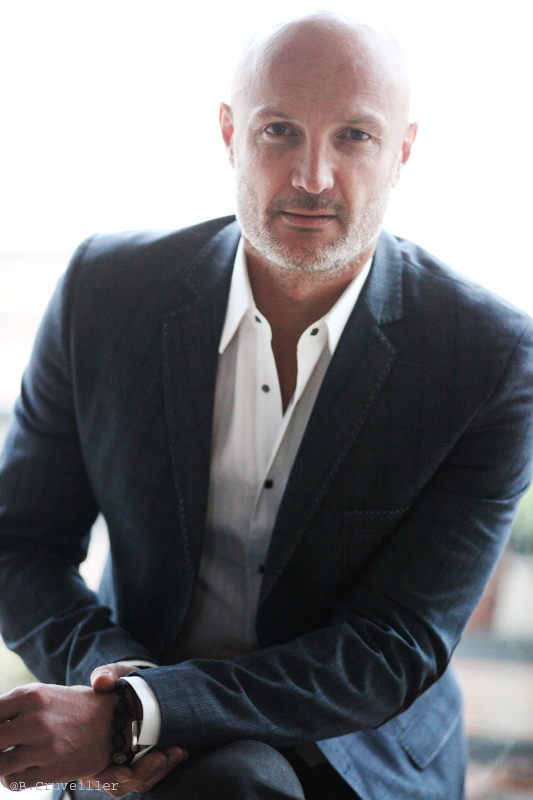
Leboeuf in 2011

In 2001, whilst still playing football for Chelsea, Leboeuf had made his first acting appearance in the film Taking Sides. Following his retirement from competitive football, Leboeuf spent two years living in Los Angeles. During this time he played for amateur team Hollywood United, alongside celebrity team-mates such as Vinnie Jones, Steve Jones and Anthony LaPaglia. Leboeuf studied at the Lee Strasberg Institute in West Hollywood, keeping a low profile, and won his first acting work as a TV commentator, for a pay cheque totalling $100, which he keeps as a memento. Leboeuf acted in several theatre plays in France, including starring alongside Jean-Francois Garreaud in L'intrus in 2010 and a role in the play Avec Ma Belle Mère et Moi. In 2014, Leboeuf played a French Resistance fighter in the World War II film Allies and a doctor in the Stephen Hawking biopic The Theory of Everything.

== Other media ==
Leboeuf works as a sports commentator and analyst for RMC and ESPN in the United States and he writes a column for Chelsea News in the UK. In 2010, he was a contestant on the reality television show Koh-Lanta in the Koh-Lanta, le choc des héros special series. He was forced to depart the show after two episodes due to a back injury he had suffered in a car accident shortly before the series commenced. In 2014, Leboeuf made an appearance in the television comedy series Nos Chers Voisins and began writing a column for Téléfoot.

In 2019, Leboeuf competed on the first season of Mask Singer, the French version of the global franchise Masked Singer, disguised as a peacock.

== Personal life ==
Leboeuf is married to actress Chrislaure Nollet and has two children, Jade and Hugo, from his first marriage to Beatrice. His amateur sporting hobbies include tennis, swimming and boxing.

Leboeuf is the cousin of the hotelier Philippe Leboeuf.

Following the 1998 World Cup, he was appointed a Knight of the Legion of Honour in 1998.

== Honours ==
Strasbourg

- Division 2 play-offs: 1991–92
- Coupe de France runner-up: 1994–95
- UEFA Intertoto Cup: 1995

Chelsea

- FA Cup: 1996–97, 1999–2000
- Football League Cup: 1997–98
- FA Charity Shield: 2000
- UEFA Cup Winners' Cup: 1997–98
- UEFA Super Cup: 1998

Al-Sadd

- Qatar Stars League: 2003–04

Al-Wakrah

- Sheikh Jassim Cup: 2004–05

France

- FIFA World Cup: 1998
- UEFA European Championship: 2000
- FIFA Confederations Cup: 2001

Orders

- Knight of the Legion of Honour: 1998
- Officer of the Legion of Honour: 2026
