= Alejandro Moreno =

Venezuelan footballer (born 1979)

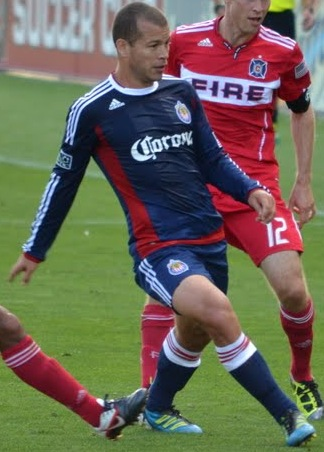
- Moreno with Chivas USA in 2011

Personal information
- Full name: Alejandro Enrique Moreno Riera
- Date of birth: July 8, 1979 (age 47)
- Place of birth: Barquisimeto, Venezuela
- Height: 5 ft 9 in (1.75 m)
- Position: Forward

Youth career
- 1993–1998: Dallas Texans

College career
Years	Team	Apps	(Gls)
1998–2001	UNC Greensboro Spartans		

Senior career*
Years	Team	Apps	(Gls)
2002–2004	Los Angeles Galaxy	61	(12)
2005	San Jose Earthquakes	31	(8)
2006–2007	Houston Dynamo	34	(3)
2007–2009	Columbus Crew	74	(20)
2010	Philadelphia Union	26	(2)
2011–2012	Chivas USA	46	(7)
Total		272	(52)

International career
2004–2012	Venezuela	41	(3)
- * Club domestic league appearances and goals

Alejandro Enrique Moreno Riera (born July 8, 1979) is a Venezuelan former professional footballer who played as a forward, and who is a television commentator for ESPN FC, ESPN Deportes and ESPN Latin America. He won three MLS Cups during his professional career.

== Club career ==
=== College ===
Moreno spent a year in Texas at age 12 and spent succeeding summers there before earning a scholarship for four years of college soccer at UNC Greensboro. He finished his college career fourth on the team's all-time scoring lists, with 65 goals and 25 assists, having been named first team NSCAA All-South all four years with the team.

=== Professional ===
After completing his career at Greensboro, Moreno was drafted 27th overall in the 2002 MLS SuperDraft by the Los Angeles Galaxy. He played sparingly in his rookie season, but developed into an excellent sparkplug coming off the bench in his second season, when he registered six goals and two assists in 1,117 minutes of playing time.

Although Moreno exhibited a good deal of promise in 2003, he was not able to earn a consistent starting role with the Galaxy because of a logjam at the forward position, which included Guatemalan star Carlos Ruiz and former US international Jovan Kirovski, as well as recent acquisition Joseph Ngwenya. In 2004, Moreno again registered six goals and two assists, this time in 1,297 minutes. He was traded to San Jose Earthquakes in the offseason in a four-player deal. In his lone season with the Quakes, Moreno scored eight goals with four assists. Along with the rest of his Earthquakes teammates, he moved to Houston for the 2006 season.

Moreno was traded to Columbus Crew on May 10, 2007, in exchange for Joseph Ngwenya. He scored the first goal in the 2008 MLS Cup for Columbus, who eventually won the game 3-1 against New York Red Bulls.

Moreno was selected by Philadelphia Union in the 2009 MLS Expansion Draft on 25 November 2009.

On November 24, 2010, Moreno was selected by Vancouver Whitecaps FC in the 2010 MLS Expansion Draft, but was immediately traded to Chivas USA, along with Alan Gordon, in exchange for allocation money and an international roster spot.

Moreno remained with Chivas USA through the 2012 season. After the conclusion of the 2012 season, Chivas USA declined the 2013 option on Moreno's contract and he entered the 2012 MLS Re-Entry Draft. Moreno became a free agent after he went undrafted in both rounds of the draft. In February 2013, he joined the Philadelphia Union as a television commentator, ending his playing career.

== International career ==
Moreno's performances in MLS saw him receive call-ups for the Venezuela national team. He made his first appearance for the senior team on February 18, 2004, against Australia. Due to his high quality of form during the 2008 MLS season, Moreno was again called up to the Venezuela national team for some 2010 FIFA World Cup qualification matches, scoring against Ecuador on October 15, 2008, in a 3–1 win.

== Media career ==
In 2013, ESPN FC hired Moreno as a color commentator and analyst. He frequently covers Liga MX and Mexico national football team games on ESPN's English-language networks. In 2014, he served as color commentator for the Philadelphia Union of Major League Soccer.

== Career statistics ==
=== Club ===
Appearances and goals by club, season and competition
Club	Season	League			MLS Cup Playoffs		U.S. Open Cup		International cup		Total	
Club	Season	Division	Apps	Goals	Apps	Goals	Apps	Goals	Apps	Goals	Apps	Goals
LA Galaxy	2002	MLS	12	0	5	0	3	1	—		20	1
LA Galaxy	2003	MLS	24	6	2	0	3	3	1 (Note: Appearance(s) in CONCACAF Champions Cup)	0	30	9
LA Galaxy	2004	MLS	25	6	2	0	1	0	—		28	6
LA Galaxy	Total		61	12	9	0	7	4	1	0	78	16
San Jose Earthquakes	2005	MLS	31	8	2	0	2	0	—		35	8
Houston Dynamo	2006	MLS	30	3	4	0	3	3	—		37	6
Houston Dynamo	2007	MLS	4	0	—		—		3	0	7	0
Houston Dynamo	Total		34	3	4	0	3	3	3	0	44	6
Columbus Crew	2007	MLS	25	7	—		—		—		25	7
Columbus Crew	2008	MLS	27	9	4	1	2	0	—		33	10
Columbus Crew	2009	MLS	22	4	1	0	1	0	5	0	29	4
Columbus Crew	Total		74	20	5	1	3	0	5	0	87	21
Philadelphia Union	2010	MLS	26	2	—		1	0	—		27	2
Chivas USA	2011	MLS	24	5	—		—		—		24	5
Chivas USA	2012	MLS	22	2	—		3	0	—		25	2
Chivas USA	Total		46	7	—		3	0	—		49	7
Career Total			272	52	20	1	19	7	9	0	320	60

=== International ===
Appearances and goals by national team and year
National team	Year	Apps	Goals
Venezuela	2004	3	0
Venezuela	2005	1	0
Venezuela	2006	2	0
Venezuela	2008	5	2
Venezuela	2009	10	0
Venezuela	2010	8	0
Venezuela	2011	11	1
Venezuela	2012	2	0
Total		42	3

Scores and results list Venezuela's goal tally first, score column indicates score after each Moreno goal.

List of international goals scored by Alejandro Moreno
No.	Date	Venue	Opponent	Score	Result	Competition	Ref.
1	20 August 2008	Estadio José Antonio Anzoátegui, Puerto La Cruz, Venezuela	Syria	4–0	4–1	Friendly	
2	15 October 2008	Estadio José Antonio Anzoátegui, Puerto La Cruz, Venezuela	Ecuador	2–1	3–1	2010 FIFA World Cup qualification	
3	25 March 2011	Montego Bay Sports Complex, Montego Bay, Jamaica	Jamaica	2–0	2–0	Friendly	

== Honors ==
Los Angeles Galaxy

- MLS Cup: 2002
- Supporters' Shield: 2002

San Jose Earthquakes

- Supporters' Shield: 2005

Houston Dynamo

- MLS Cup: 2006

Columbus Crew

- MLS Cup: 2008
- Supporters' Shield: 2008, 2009

Sporting positions
Preceded by Simon Elliott	Chivas USA captain 2012	Succeeded by Dan Kennedy
