= Ian Darke =

English association football and boxing commentator

- Born: 1954 (age 71–72)
- Occupation: Sports commentator

Ian Darke (born 1954) is an English association football and boxing commentator who currently works for ESPN and TNT Sports. Darke was previously one of Sky's "Big Four" football commentators alongside Martin Tyler, Alan Parry and Rob Hawthorne. He was also the main commentator for Sky's big boxing fights and has covered some of the biggest fights involving British boxers along with Jim Watt.

== Career ==
=== BBC Radio/Sky Sports ===
Darke worked for nearly ten years on BBC Radio covering boxing, athletics and football, before moving to Sky Sports in 1992 to commentate on the newly formed FA Premier League. He was the number two to lead commentator Martin Tyler and was the main commentator for Ford Monday Night Football.

In 1995, as Sky's boxing coverage expanded so much that the sport almost disappeared from terrestrial screens, Darke switched permanently to be their main boxing commentator, his role on Monday Night Football being taken by Rob Hawthorne. He was one of the Sky commentators for Evander Holyfield vs. Mike Tyson II, the fight known for being the one where Tyson bit off a piece of Holyfield's ear.

Nearly ten years later, after boxing promoter Frank Warren took his fighters to ITV, Sky's boxing output was significantly reduced, freeing up Darke for a return to 'live' football (although he had commentated on matches for an international audience, and had been heard on Sky covering some Champions League matches). Darke commentated on matches such as the 2005 Champions League semi-final between Chelsea and Liverpool.

Darke enjoyed a prolific Sky Sports career with commentaries for Premier League, UEFA Champions League and Football League matches, as well as maintaining his boxing commitments.

=== ESPN ===
Howard gratefully claims it. Distribution: brilliant... Landon Donovan, are things on here for the USA? Can they do it here? Cross – and Dempsey is denied again! And Donovan has scored!! Oh, can you believe this!? Go, go, USA! Certainly through! Oh, it's incredible! You could not write a script like this!

— Darke's call on ESPN during Landon Donovan's winning goal against Algeria in the 2010 World Cup group stage.

In 2010, Sky did not receive rights to the 2010 FIFA World Cup, and Darke was hired to be an ESPN commentator for their coverage of the World Cup for the American market, and he became known to the American public as the English-language commentator for Landon Donovan's last-second goal for the United States against Algeria that allowed the USA to not only advance to the knockout stage, but also win their group.

Rapinoe gets a cross in. In towards Wambach! Oh, can you believe this! Abby Wambach has saved the USA's life in this World Cup!

— Darke's call on ESPN for Abby Wambach's tying goal against Brazil in the 2011 Women's World Cup quarterfinals.

Despite beginning the 2010–11 Premier League season with Sky in the UK, Darke was offered a three-year contract to join ESPN in the U.S. as their voice of the Premier League. He accepted the offer. Darke later expanded his duties to commentate on MLS games, the 2013 FIFA Confederations Cup and the 2014 FIFA World Cup, where he was their lead commentator and called the final.

Zusi to take it...And there! It's there! What about that! It's John Brooks! It's John Brooks! For the USA! Have they stolen it?

— Darke's call on ESPN for John Brooks' winning goal against Ghana in the 2014 World Cup group stage.

Darke paired with Julie Foudy to lead ESPN's coverage of the 2011 FIFA Women's World Cup and commentated another American tournament-saving goal – Abby Wambach's last-second header against Brazil in the quarterfinals – before teaming with Taylor Twellman (for Team USA's games) and Steve McManaman (for other games, including those featuring England and the final between Germany and Argentina) during the 2014 World Cup.

Darke returned to ESPN more permanently as the lead La Liga commentator alongside his long time broadcast partner Steve McManaman.

For the 2022 World Cup, ESPN loaned Darke to Fox Sports.

The fact that Darke has commentated enthusiastically for MLS and for both the US Men's and Women's National Teams has led The American Outlaws to create a chant named "Ian Darke, you are a Yank" and the Men in Blazers (Michael Davies and Roger Bennett) to name him "Sir Ian Darke".

Football TV credits
Event	Broadcast years
FIFA World Cup	1994 (ABC/ESPN), 2010 (ABC/ESPN), 2014 (ABC/ESPN), 2018 (World Feed), 2022 (FOX/FS1), 2026 (FOX/FS1)
FIFA Women's World Cup	2011 (ESPN)
FIFA Confederations Cup	2013 (ESPN)
Premier League	1992–2010 (Sky Sports), 2010–2013 (ESPN), 2013–present (BT Sport/TNT Sports), 2019–present (Prime Video Sport)
UEFA Champions League/UEFA Europa League	2003–2010 (Sky Sports), 2015-present (BT Sport/TNT Sports)
FA Cup	1990–2010 (Sky Sports), 2013–2021 (BT Sport), 2022 (ESPN)
US Men's National Soccer Team Friendlies	2010–2022 (ESPN)
US Women's National Soccer Team Friendlies	2011–2022 (ESPN)
UEFA European Championship	2012 (ESPN), 2016 (ESPN), 2020 (Note: played in 2021 because of the COVID-19 pandemic.) (ABC/ESPN), 2024 (FOX/FS1)
La Liga	2021–present (ABC/ESPN)

=== BT Sport/TNT Sports ===
At the start of the 2013–14 Premier League season, Darke joined the BT Sport team as a commentator for English Premier League matches. He can also be heard on the Premier League world feed. He commentated on the 2014, 2016, 2017 and 2019 FA Cup Final.

=== Fox Sports ===
Darke announced on Twitter on July 26, 2022 that he would be joining Fox Sports' slate of broadcasters for the 2022 FIFA World Cup in a supporting role, comparing his stint to a loan from ESPN. Darke and Landon Donovan were named the lead announcing team for UEFA Euro 2024.

== Personal life ==
Darke's son Adam is a documentary maker on sports, and is also a wellbeing coach. Like his father, he supports Portsmouth F.C.

== Notes ==
Media offices
Preceded by JP Dellacamera	MLS Cup play-by-play announcer 2010–2011	Succeeded by Adrian Healey
