= Craig Burley =

Scottish footballer and television pundit

Personal information
- Full name: Craig William Burley
- Date of birth: 24 September 1971 (age 55)
- Place of birth: Ayr, Scotland
- Height: 6 ft 1 in (1.85 m)
- Position: Midfielder

Youth career
- Chelsea

Senior career*
Years	Team	Apps	(Gls)
1989–1997	Chelsea	113	(7)
1997–1999	Celtic	64	(20)
1999–2003	Derby County	73	(10)
2003	Dundee	2	(0)
2004	Preston North End	4	(0)
2004	Walsall	5	(0)
Total		261	(37)

International career
1992–1993	Scotland U21	7	(0)
1995–2003	Scotland	46	(3)
- * Club domestic league appearances and goals

Craig William Burley (born 24 September 1971) is a Scottish former professional footballer and sports television pundit and co-commentator for ESPN.

As a player he was a midfielder from 1989 until 2004, notably playing in the Premier League for Chelsea and Derby County and in the Scottish Premier League for Celtic. He also played for Dundee and finished his career in the Football League with Preston North End and Walsall. He earned 46 caps for Scotland, scoring three goals.

Since retiring and working as a pundit amongst others he has worked for BBC Sport, ESPN and BT Sport.

== Club career ==
Burley began his professional career with Chelsea in 1989. He made his debut in April 1991, when he came on as a substitute for Kerry Dixon in a 7–0 defeat against Nottingham Forest. He made his first appearance in the newly formed Premier League on 5 December 1992 in a 2–1 away win at Tottenham Hotspur.

He went on to become a regular under Glenn Hoddle and played in the 1994 FA Cup final against Manchester United, picking up a runners-up medal following a 4–0 defeat. Two years later, Chelsea got to the FA Cup semi-finals where they again faced Manchester United. With the score level at 1–1, Burley hit an errant back pass to set up David Beckham for what proved to be the winning goal. Chelsea won the 1996–97 FA Cup; Burley was left out of the squad for the final but played in the semi-final against Wimbledon. He was sold by Ruud Gullit on 25 July 1997 to Celtic for £2.5 million.

He made his Celtic debut on 3 August 1997 against Hibernian, and went on to make 64 appearances scoring 20 goals before transferring back to England with Derby County on 1 December 1999 for £3 million. He played in four seasons for The Rams and suffered his first career relegation when the club lost their Premier League status at the end of the 2001–02 season.

On 12 September 2003 he signed with Dundee on a free transfer but only played twice in a two-month spell before being released and eventually signing for Preston North End in January 2004. By March he was a free agent again after only making four appearances for North End. He signed with Walsall on a free transfer for the remainder of the 2003–04 season and played five times before retiring at the end of the season.

In 1998, Burley won SFWA Footballer of the Year and was shortlisted for the Scottish PFA Player of the Year.

== International career ==
After making his Scotland debut in 1995, Burley was also in the starting line-up for a fixture against Estonia in Tallinn in October 1996, but a scheduling dispute meant the home team did not adhere to a quickly-rearranged afternoon kick-off time, and the match was abandoned at kick-off with no caps awarded to the Scotland players; the fixture was re-arranged for the following February, but Burley was injured and did not take part.

Burley played at UEFA Euro 1996 in England and in the 1998 FIFA World Cup in France. At France '98 he scored the Scotland goal in a 1–1 draw with Norway in Bordeaux, latching on to a ball played forward by defender David Weir. He was then sent off in the final group game against Morocco as Scotland were eliminated. His goal against Norway was the last scored by a Scotland player at a major tournament, until Callum McGregor scored his goal against Croatia in the final group stage of UEFA Euro 2020, 23 years later (held in 2021).

Burley continued to play under Craig Brown until the end of the unsuccessful 2002 FIFA World Cup qualifying campaign, captaining the side in what proved to be his penultimate appearance. After suffering injury problems, Burley won a Scotland recall against Austria in 2003 under new manager Berti Vogts but then announced his international retirement.

== Media career ==
Burley previously worked as a pundit and commentator for ESPN UK, Absolute Radio, BT Sport and BBC Radio 5 Live. He was ESPN's lead Scottish football co-commentator as well as fill-in for Chris Waddle on Premier League broadcasts and studio pundit for FA Cup. Burley worked the 2010 World Cup and Euro 2012 as a co-commentator for ITV Sport including the 2010 World Cup Final. He then worked the 2014 World Cup and Euro 2016 as a co-commentator and studio pundit for ABC and ESPN. He is currently a pundit on the programme ESPN FC.

== Personal life ==
He is the nephew of former Scotland manager George Burley. Burley is married to Sheryl (born 1971) and they have three children together. In 2013, Burley moved to Avon, Connecticut, in the US to work for ESPN.

== Career statistics ==
=== International ===
Scotland
Year	Apps	Goals
1995	5	0
1996	10	0
1997	8	0
1998	6	3
1999	7	0
2000	4	0
2001	5	0
2002	–	
2003	1	0
Total	46	3

Scores and results list Scotland's goal tally first, score column indicates score after each Burley goal.

List of international goals scored by Craig Burley
No.	Date	Venue	Opponent	Score	Result	Competition	Ref.
1	23 May 1998	Giants Stadium, East Rutherford	Colombia	2–1	2–2	Friendly	
2	16 June 1998	Parc Lescure, Bordeaux	Norway	1–1	1–1	1998 FIFA World Cup	
3	14 October 1998	Pittodrie Stadium, Aberdeen	Faroe Islands	1–0	2–1	UEFA Euro 2000 qualification	

== Honours ==
Chelsea

- FA Cup runner-up: 1993–94

Celtic

- Scottish Premier Division: 1997–98
- Scottish League Cup: 1997–98

Individual

- SFWA Footballer of the Year: 1998

== See also ==
- List of Scotland national football team captains
- List of Scottish football families
