= List of current Major League Soccer broadcasters =

The following is a list of current Major League Soccer broadcasters for each individual team.

== International video broadcasters ==
=== 2023–2032 ===
Apple Inc. has exclusive global rights to every MLS match and Leagues Cup match, with commentary in English and Spanish on MLS Season Pass. All match broadcasts are produced by MLS Productions, a partnership of Major League Soccer, IMG and NEP Group. MLS generally assigns announcers regionally, reportedly to retain local familiarity among fans but largely suspected to be to save money on production costs.

All commentary was on-site in 2023, allaying concerns about remote broadcasts, as well as in 2024. During the 2025 season, MLS began assigning commentators in both English and Spanish to work "off tube" (remotely) from NEP Vista Worldlink in Dania Beach, Florida, USA.

In addition, MLS Productions produces whip-around, pre-match and post-match studio shows from WWE Studio in Stamford, Connecticut. There is a pre-match show, MLS Countdown, which airs 30 (Eastern) or 15 (Central/Mountain/Pacific) minutes before games, which in most cases will be 7:30 p.m. local time. The national post-match show, MLS Wrap-Up, airs at 12:30 a.m. Eastern time. The whip-around show is called MLS 360 and will cut into matches of significance.

All matches involving CF Montréal, Toronto FC, and Vancouver Whitecaps FC had French-language commentary in 2023. Montréal has been the sole French-language broadcast for Apple since 2024.

Beginning in 2026 season, the MLS Season Pass subscription will be discontinued and all MLS content will be integrated into Apple TV service. After making cuts to Spanish-language coverage and moving some off-site production to the UK, MLS has recommitted to having all commentators on-site in 2026 and beyond.

Broadcast	Play-by-play (main commentator)	Color commentator	Sideline reporter	Studio host	Studio analyst (pundit)	Network
MLS Productions (English)	Jake Zivin (lead); Max Bretos; Nate Bukaty; Steve Cangialosi; Jessica Charman; Keith Costigan; Mark Followill; Alex Heinert; Tony Husband; Christian Miles; Blake Price; Mark Rogondino; Neil Sika; Mike Watts; Evan Weston; Callum Williams; Chris Wittyngham; Jonathan Yardley	Taylor Twellman (lead); Warren Barton; Calen Carr; Kyndra de St. Aubin; Paul Dolan; Brian Dunseth; Maurice Edu; Danny Higginbotham; Ian Joy; Devon Kerr; Lori Lindsey; Heath Pearce; Ross Smith; Kacey White; Jamie Watson	Jillian Sakovits; Andrew Wiebe	Kevin Egan	Sacha Kljestan; Bradley Wright-Phillips; Dax McCarty	Apple TV
MLS Productions (Spanish)	Sammy Sadovnik (lead); Jesús Acosta; Alejandro Figueredo; Nacho García; Raul Guzman; Moisés Linares; Jorge Pérez-Navarro; Diego Pessolano; Carlos Mauricio Ramírez; Pablo Ramírez; Francisco X. Rivera; Sergio Ruiz; Oscar Salazar; Ramses Sandoval; Bruno Vain	Diego Valeri (lead); Andrés Agulla; Marcelo Balboa; Jésus Bracamontes; Daniel Chapela; Tony Cherchi; Miguel Gallardo; Walter Roque; Giovanni Savarese	Antonella González; Michele Giannone	Antonella González; Ramses Sandoval		Apple TV
MLS Productions (French)	Frédéric Lord	Vincent Destouches				Apple TV

== National video broadcasters ==
Media rights to MLS and Leagues Cup matches sold to national video broadcasters are non-exclusive.

=== 2023–2026 ===
Broadcast	Play-by-play (main commentator)	Color commentator(s)	Sideline reporter	Studio host	Studio analyst(s)	Network
MLS on Fox/FS1 (US, English)	John Strong (lead); Nate Bukaty; Josh Eastern; Joe Malfa; Mike Watts; Alex Heinert; Steve Cangialosi; Keith Costigan; Andrés Cordero	Stuart Holden (lead); Maurice Edu; Lloyd Sam; Devon Kerr; Warren Barton; Jamie Watson; Danny Higginbotham; Jill Loyden; Jordan Angeli	Jenny Taft (MLS Cup only)	Rob Stone (MLS Cup only); Jenny Taft (MLS Cup only)	Alexi Lalas (MLS Cup only); Joe Machnik (rules analyst; MLS Cup only)	Fox/FS1
MLS en FOX Deportes (US, Spanish)	John Laguna (lead); Rodolfo Landeros; Alejandro Luna; Jairo Moncada	Mariano Trujillo (lead); Claudio Suárez; Martín Zúñiga; Álvaro Izquierdo	Ashley Gonzalez; Livette Ruvalcaba			Fox Deportes
MLS on TSN (Canada, English)	Luke Wileman (Toronto, lead); Matt Cullen (Toronto, backup); Blake Price (Vancouver, backup); Jon Still (Montréal, backup)	Steven Caldwell (Toronto, lead); Kevin Kilbane (Toronto, backup); Jim Brennan (Vancouver, backup); Jason De Vos (Toronto, backup)	Matthew Scianitti (Toronto, lead); Daniel Zakrzewski (Toronto, backup); Kenzie Lalonde (Montréal, bureau chief); Amy Walsh (Montréal, backup); Shantelle Chand (Vancouver, playoff matches only)	Camila Gonzalez (lead); Matthew Scianitti (backup); Mark Roe (backup); Lindsay Hamilton (backup); Brendan Dunlop (backup); Daniel Zakrzewski (Toronto, backup)	Kevin Kilbane (lead); Julian de Guzman; Doneil Henry; Joe Fletcher (rules analyst)	TSN/TSN2
MLS à RDS (Canada, French)	Claudine Douville (lead); Olivier Brett (CF Montréal matches); Jasmin Leroux; Émilie Duquette	Jean Gounelle (lead); Patrice Bernier (CF Montréal away matches); Wandrille Lefèvre (CF Montréal home matches)	Antonin Besner (lead); Meeker Guerrier; Nicolas Landry	Olivier Brett (lead); François-Etienne Corbin (backup); Émilie Duquette (backup); Jasmin Leroux (backup); Claudine Douville (backup)	Patrice Bernier (lead); Wandrille Lefèvre; Jean Gounelle; Laurent Ciman; Patrick Leduc; Nick De Santis; Jonathan Bourgault; Valmie Ouellet; Amy Walsh; Marinette Pichon; Sydney Fowo; Sonia Denoncourt (rules analyst)	RDS/RDS2/RDS Info
Leagues Cup en TUDN (US, Spanish)	Paco González; Daniel Nohra; Antonio Gómez Luna	Marc Crosas; Hugo Salcedo; Aldo Farías; Manuel Barrera	Daniel Schvartsman	Alejandro de la Rosa; Ana Caty Hernández; Valeria Marín		TUDN/Univision/UniMás
Leagues Cup en TUDN (Mexico, Spanish)	Andrés Vaca	David Faitelson; Ricardo La Volpe; Carlos Reinoso; Rafael Puente; Damián Zamogilny	Gibrán Araige	Alejandro de la Rosa; Ana Caty Hernández; Valeria Marín		Canal 5/Nueve/TUDN
Leagues Cup en Imagen (Mexico, Spanish)	Enrique Noriega	Natalia Briz; Jürgen Damm				Imagen Televisión

== Regional radio broadcasters ==
Note: MLS Season Pass on Apple TV includes the English-language MLS regional radio broadcast for the home team during the 2023–2032 seasons.

=== Eastern Conference ===
Team	Play-by-play	Color commentator(s)	Sideline Reporter	Flagship Station
Atlanta United FC	Mike Conti	Jason Longshore		WZGC (primary, other Audacy stations in Atlanta such as WSTR may air matches during conflicts)
Atlanta United FC	Daniel Cantu	Elsa Barrionuevo	Ivett Carillo (home matches)	WAOS/WXEM/WLBA (Spanish Radio)
Charlotte FC	Will Palaszczuk	Anna Witte		WFNZ
Charlotte FC	Jaime Moreno	Antonio Ramos		WOLS (Spanish Radio)
Chicago Fire FC	Max Anderson	Joe Chatz		WLS wlsam.com
Chicago Fire FC	Omar Ramos	Teresa Limon		WOJO (Spanish Radio)
Columbus Crew	Chris Doran			WXZX
Columbus Crew	Juan Valladares			WWLA (Spanish Radio)
D.C. United	Dave Johnson	Bruce Murray		WTSD
D.C. United	TBD	TBD		TBD (Spanish Radio)
FC Cincinnati	Tom Gelehrter	Kevin McCloskey		WSAI
FC Cincinnati	Gustavo Luques	José Romero		WIZF-HD2
Inter Miami CF	Michael Rizzo			ESPN 106.3 FM WUUB
Inter Miami CF	Leo Vega	Fernando Fiore		Deportes 760-AM WEFL (Spanish Radio)
CF Montréal	Jon Still (primary); Sean Campbell (select games)	Grant Needham (primary); Amy Walsh (select games)	Amy Walsh (select games)	CKGM (English Radio); CJAD (select games)
CF Montréal	Maxime Van Houtte	Raphaël Doucet; Sydney Fowo	Georges Laraque	CKLX-FM (French-language Radio)
Nashville SC	Will Boling; Lucas Panzica	Eddie Carvacho		WGFX
Nashville SC	Alexis Martínez	Mánfred Villalobos		WMGC (Spanish Radio)
New England Revolution	Brad Feldman	Charlie Davies		WBZ-FM (Radio); SportsHub-HD2 (Radio- Bruins or Celtics conflicts)
New England Revolution	Hipólito Gamboa	José Manuel Abundis		WAMG (Spanish Radio)
New England Revolution	Conrado Giulietti	Luis Lombardi Jr.		WBIX Portuguese radio
New York City FC	Glenn Crooks	Matthew Lawrence		newyorkcityfc.com by TuneIn
New York City FC	Roberto Abramowitz	Ariel Judas		newyorkcityfc.com by TuneIn
New York Red Bulls	Matt Harmon	Steve Jolley		Red Bulls Live Online Radio
New York Red Bulls	Stefano Fusaro			Red Bulls Live Online Radio (Spanish)
Orlando City SC	Jack Edwards; Scott Harris	Scott Sutter		WRSO
Orlando City SC	Carlos Bohorquez	Israel Heredia		Mega 97.1 (Spanish Radio)
Orlando City SC	Luiz Lombardi	Rodrigo Costa; Gabi Pasqualin		WRLZ (Portuguese radio)
Philadelphia Union	Dave Leno (primary); Jonathan Yardley (backup); Lisa Roman Carlin (emergency backup)	Sheanon Williams (primary); Lisa Roman Carlin (backup); Sébastien Le Toux (backup)		WPEN-FM
Philadelphia Union	Luis Márquez	Jaime Becerril		WHAT (Spanish Radio)
Toronto FC	Sam Ravech or Gareth Wheeler			Apple TV Exclusive (Home matches ONLY)

=== Western Conference ===
Team	Play-by-play	Color commentator	Sideline Reporter	Flagship Station
Austin FC	Lincoln Rose			Alt 97.5 FM
Austin FC	Ignacio Araujo			KLQB (Spanish Radio)
Colorado Rapids	Connor Cape	Drew Moor (home matches only)		KKSE; KKSE-FM
Colorado Rapids	José Rios	Mauricio Jamarillo		KXDP-LD (Spanish Radio)
FC Dallas	Ryan Figert	Steve Davis	Garrett Melcer (reporter); Sam Hale (host)	FC Dallas App
Houston Dynamo FC	Alex Parra (home matches only)			Houston Dynamo App; MLS Season Pass audio option
Houston Dynamo FC	Daniel Mejia	Cesar Procel		KDMX (Spanish Radio)
LA Galaxy	Joe Tutino			lagalaxy.com and LA Galaxy YouTube channel
LA Galaxy	Rolando "El Veloz" González			KWKW (Spanish Radio)
Los Angeles FC	Dave Denholm			KSPN
Los Angeles FC	Armando Aguayo			KFWB (Spanish Radio)
Los Angeles FC	Hyunjoon Lee	Kyungsoo Park	—N/a	KYPA and KALI-FM HD2 (K Radio; Korean-language Radio; beginning with 2025 Matchday 31 LA FC v. San Diego FC)
Minnesota United FC	Dan Terhaar	Jonathan Harrison		KSTP-AM
Portland Timbers	Fletcher Johnson	Aaron Heinzen		KRSK-FM
Portland Timbers	Josue Del Castillo	Oscar Ramos		KXET (Spanish Radio)
Real Salt Lake	David James	Jay Nolly		KSL
Real Salt Lake	Nelson Moran			KBMG (Spanish radio)
San Diego FC	Adrian Garcia Marquez	Darren Smith		KGB
San Diego FC	Ricardo Jiménez			XEPE (Spanish Radio)
San Jose Earthquakes	Ted Ramey	Joe Cannon		KSFO
San Jose Earthquakes	Carlos Cesar Rivera	Ramiro Corrales		KZSF (Spanish Radio)
Seattle Sounders FC	Danny Jackson	Brad Evans; Steve Zakuani	Keely Dunning	KJR
Seattle Sounders FC	Mario Rodriguez	Felipe Maqueda (select games); Carlos Tapia (select games)		KKMO (Spanish Radio)
Sporting Kansas City	Blake Aerni	Jon Kempin		WHB
Sporting Kansas City	Josue Orrantes	Diego Gutierrez		KDTD (Spanish Radio)
St. Louis City SC	Joey Zanaboni	Dale Schilly		KYKY (primary); KMOX (occasional)
St. Louis City SC	Santiago Beltran	Hector Vega		KXOK-LP (Spanish Radio)
Vancouver Whitecaps FC	Asa Rehman	Colin Miller	Sarita Patel	CKNW.com (primary) CKNW (occasional)
Vancouver Whitecaps FC	Jagraj Lalli	Shubram Arora; Pervez Sandhu		CJCN (Punjabi radio)

== See also ==
- Major League Soccer on television
- List of current Major League Baseball broadcasters
- List of current National Basketball Association broadcasters
- List of current National Football League broadcasters
- List of current National Hockey League broadcasters
- List of current Women's National Basketball Association broadcasters
