= Soccer on Fox Sports =

- Genre: Soccer telecasts
- Presented by: Rob Stone
- Theme music composer: Peter Calandra
- Country of origin: United States
- Original language: English

Production
- Camera setup: Multi-camera
- Running time: 3+ hours (or until game ends)
- Production company: Fox Sports

Original release
- Network: Fox; Fox Sports 1 Fox Sports 2 Fox Soccer Plus

Fox Sports has televised various American and international soccer competitions; as of 2026, it primarily holds rights to FIFA tournaments (including the FIFA World Cup), UEFA national team tournaments (including UEFA Euro), CONCACAF events (including the CONCACAF Gold Cup), and CONMEBOL events (including Copa América). Fox Sports also covers several club competitions, particularly Major League Soccer and Liga MX.

Most of Fox's soccer coverage airs across the Fox network and cable channels Fox Sports 1, Fox Sports 2, and Fox Deportes, with Fox Soccer Plus occasionally used as overflow for soccer and other international sporting events that Fox holds rights to. Fox formerly operated the Fox Soccer cable network, which was replaced by the comedy-oriented FXX in 2013. Prior to the launch of FS1 and FS2, the Fox Sports Networks were also used to carry matches.

== Current contracts ==
=== FIFA ===
On October 22, 2011, FIFA awarded English-language rights to its tournaments to Fox from 2015 through 2022, including the 2018 and 2022 FIFA World Cup, and the 2015 (which would mark Fox's first professional FIFA tournament broadcast) and 2019 FIFA Women's World Cup, replacing ESPN and ABC.

In February 2015, the contract was extended to 2026 (a tournament that would ultimately be hosted by the United States, Mexico, and Canada), in what was reported to be compensation for the re-scheduling of the 2022 World Cup to late-November/mid-December (which conflicts with the regular seasons of most major U.S. leagues, including the NFL) due to the climate of the host country.

Fox's contract expires following the 2026 World Cup; Netflix acquired exclusive rights to the 2027 and 2031 FIFA Women's World Cup in the United States. For the 2026 World Cup, Fox introduced the nightly aftershow, FIFA World Cup on Fox After Hours, which is hosted by British comedian and former Late Late Show host James Corden.

=== UEFA ===
In November 2021, Fox Sports acquired the English-language rights to UEFA national team tournaments from 2022 through 2028, replacing ESPN. These include rights to the UEFA European Championship in 2024 and 2028, UEFA Women's Euro 2025, the UEFA Nations League, UEFA qualifiers for Euro and the FIFA World Cup, and UEFA-organized friendlies. In January 2022, Fox Sports announced a sublicensing agreement with the streaming service FuboTV, under which it would hold rights to the Nations League and selected qualifiers and friendlies, as well as five exclusive matches each during UEFA Euro 2024 and 2028.

=== CONCACAF ===
Fox exclusively airing most of CONCACAF Clubs and Nations Championship until 2022-2025, including Gold Cup, Champions League, and both Men's and Women's Olympic Qualifying tournament.

=== CONMEBOL ===
Fox reached a long-term agreement with CONMEBOL for airing their South American men's and women's soccer tournament, highlighted with Copa América and Copa América Femenina also including World Cup and Olympic qualifiers. This six-year agreement kicked-off in June 2021 with 2021 Copa América.

=== Liga MX ===
In May 2018, Fox Sports acquired the rights to Tijuana, Monterrey, and Santos home matches. These matches started airing across Fox Sports in late July 2018, with the exception of Santos matches which will begin in 2019. In July 2022, their coverage was expanded with addition of Juárez home matches. Matches are broadcast on FS1, FS2, Fox Deportes, and the FanDuel Sports regional networks in the Western U.S.

=== MLS ===
Fox began to broadcast Major League Soccer (MLS) in 2003, initially on Fox Sports World. The agreement with what was now called Fox Soccer Channel was renewed for one season in 2011, with Fox Soccer broadcasting 31 matches and 3 playoff matches. After losing the package to NBCSN in 2012, Fox Sports agreed to an eight-year English-language contract with MLS in 2015, with FS1 airing at least 34 matches per-season and splitting English-language rights to MLS Cup with ESPN. Fox and ESPN also alternated rights to the MLS All-Star Game and MLS Cup final, and Fox held an option for radio rights via Fox Sports Radio. Through the contract, Fox and ESPN also split a package of U.S. national team matches.

In 2023, under new contracts that saw the rights to all MLS matches move to Apple TV, Fox reached an agreement to maintain a non-exclusive package of matches on linear television through 2026, including 34 regular season matches per-season, 8 playoff matches, and the MLS Cup annually on Fox, FS1, and Fox Deportes. Fox notably displaced Univision as the league's Spanish-language rights holder.

=== Coupe de France ===
Fox acquired the rights to the Coupe de France in 2023 from beIN Sports.

=== Canadian Premier League ===
In August 2020, Fox Sports became the first American broadcast partner of the Canadian Premier League.

== Former rights ==
=== Bundesliga ===
Fox aired the Bundesliga since 2015 and aired all 306 league games and relegation playoffs via FS1, FS2, and Fox Soccer Plus. The pre-game and halftime show is hosted by Ian Joy or Kate Abdo, and two pundits (rotation). The lead commentator was Keith Costigan. The 2019–20 season was the networks' last broadcasting the Bundesliga as ESPN picked up the rights.

=== DFL-Supercup ===
Fox has aired the German DFL-Supercup since 2015 and only airs select tournament matches.

=== Premier League ===
Fox Soccer aired the English Premier League from 2000 to 2013. In the later years of their coverage, Fox had a studio pregame show first hosted by Christian Miles until 2011, then by Rob Stone. Studio analysts were Warren Barton, Eric Wynalda, and Keith Costigan. Commentary was provided by former corporate sibling Sky Sports.

=== FA Cup ===
Fox previously aired the English FA Cup since 2014, until their rights expired in 2018. ESPN has since acquired these rights. FA Cup coverage was hosted by Rob Stone or Kate Abdo alongside a rotation of analysts including Warren Barton, Alexi Lalas, and Mario Melchiot. Lead world feed broadcast team for FA Cup was Martin Tyler and Stewart Robson.

=== UEFA Champions League and Europa League ===
Fox formerly aired the UEFA Champions League and the UEFA Europa League from 2009–18. Rob Stone hosted UEFA Champions League coverage alongside a rotation of analysts including Warren Barton, Brad Friedel, Eric Wynalda, Stuart Holden, and Alexi Lalas. Lead broadcast team for non World-Feed broadcasts of UEFA Champions League from 2013–14 was Gus Johnson and Eric Wynalda, then the World-Feed broadcasts, and finally John Strong and Stuart Holden or Brad Friedel replaced them as lead commentator from 2016–18. Ian Joy or Kate Abdo hosted UEFA Europa League coverage alongside analysts Stuart Holden, Warren Barton, and Mario Melchiot. Lead broadcast team for Europa League coverage was Keith Costigan and Alexi Lalas. For World-Feed broadcasts, Tony Jones and David Pleat call both UEFA Champions League Final and UEFA Europa League Final.

=== US Soccer ===
Through their MLS deal, Fox shared the rights to U.S. men's and women's national team matches with ESPN/ABC. John Strong and Stuart Holden were the main USMNT commentators with studio coverage hosted by Rob Stone alongside analysts Alexi Lalas and Maurice Edu. USWNT commentators were JP Dellacamera with analyst Aly Wagner and studio coverage was hosted by Rob Stone, Sara Walsh, or Jenny Taft with analysts Leslie Osborne, Heather O'Reilly, Christie Pearce Rampone, and Alexi Lalas. This coverage ended in 2022, when these rights moved to TNT Sports beginning in 2023.

== On-air staff ==
=== Regular season ===
Presenters

Name	Coverage
Rob Stone	Lead MLS and international matches studio host
Rebecca Lowe	2026 FIFA World Cup studio host
Sara Walsh	International matches studio host
Jenny Taft	International matches studio host
Jules Breach	2026 FIFA World Cup studio host
Pien Meulensteen	2026 FIFA World Cup studio host

Studio analysts

Name	Coverage
Alexi Lalas	Lead MLS and international matches studio analyst
Warren Barton	International matches color commentator/studio analyst
Maurice Edu	International matches studio analyst
Rodney Wallace	International matches studio analyst
Steve Cherundolo	International matches guest studio analyst
Kelly Smith	International matches studio analyst
Heather O'Reilly	Women's international matches studio analyst
Leslie Osborne	Women's international matches studio analyst
Christie Pearce	Women's international matches studio analyst
Melissa Ortiz	Women's international matches studio analyst
Joe Machnik	International matches rules analyst
Mark Clattenburg	International matches rules analyst

Play-by-play announcers

Name	Coverage
John Strong	Lead MLS and international play-by-play announcer
JP Dellacamera	Lead women's international matches and #2 MLS play-by-play announcer
Keith Costigan	Liga MX play-by-play announcer, fill-in international play-by-play announcer
Adrian Garcia-Marquez	Liga MX and international matches play-by-play announcer
Ian Darke	FIFA World Cup International matches play-by-play announcer
Jacqui Oatley	FIFA World Cup International matches play-by-play announcer
Jake Zivin	International fill-in play-by-play announcer
Nate Bukaty	International matches play-by-play announcer
Kate Scott	International matches play-by-play announcer
Jorge Pérez-Navarro	International matches play-by-play announcer

Color commentators

Name	Coverage
Stuart Holden	Lead MLS and international color commentator
Cobi Jones	Liga MX, international color commentator
Warren Barton	International color commentator/studio analyst
Mariano Trujillo	Liga MX and International matches color commentator
Aly Wagner	International matches
Kyndra de St. Aubin	Women's international matches
Danielle Slaton	Women's international matches
Angela Hucles	Women's international matches
Cat Whitehill	Women's international matches

Reporters

Name	Coverage
Geoff Shreeves	International matches
Rodolfo Landeros	International matches

== Past international coverage and broadcast teams ==
Event(s)	Play-by-play	Color commentator(s)	Reporters	Studio host(s)	Studio analyst(s)
2026 World Cup	John Strong; Darren Fletcher; Ian Darke; Derek Rae; JP Dellacamera; Jacqui Oatley; Ian Crocker; Mark Scott; Tyler Terens	Stuart Holden; Owen Hargreaves; Landon Donovan; Robert Green; Lori Lindsey; Warren Barton; Danny Higginbotham; Cobi Jones; Maurice Edu	Jenny Taft; Geoff Shreeves; Alex Alijoe; Katie Shanahan; Natalie Gedra; Tom Rinaldi	Rebecca Lowe; Rob Stone; Jules Breach; Pien Meulensteen	Alexi Lalas, Carli Lloyd, Clarence Seedorf, Clint Dempsey, Javier Hernández, John Obi Mikel, Juan Pablo Ángel, Landon Donovan, Peter Schmeichel, Thiago Alcântara, Thierry Henry and Zlatan Ibrahimović; Mark Clattenburg and Dr. Joe Machnik (rules analyst)
UEFA Women's Euro 2025	Jacqui Oatley; JP Dellacamera; John Strong	Lori Lindsey; Lianne Sanderson; Jen Beattie		Jules Breach	Carli Lloyd, Julie Ertz, Ariane Hingst, Alexi Lalas, Stuart Holden, Mark Clattenburg (rules analyst)
UEFA Euro 2024	Ian Darke; Derek Rae; Jacqui Oatley; Darren Fletcher	Landon Donovan; Robert Green; Warren Barton; Owen Hargreaves	Geoff Shreeves; Tom Rinaldi; Michael Timbs	Jules Breach; Rob Stone	Giorgio Chiellini, Daniel Sturridge, Peter Schmeichel, Ariane Hingst, Alexi Lalas, Stuart Holden, Maurice Edu
2024 Copa America	John Strong; JP Dellacamera; Luis Omar Tapia	Stuart Holden; Cobi Jones; Maurice Edu	Jenny Taft; Ana Jurka	Rob Stone	Alexi Lalas, Carli Lloyd, Clint Dempsey, Maurice Edu, Juan Pablo Ángel
2023 Women's World Cup	JP Dellacamera; Jacqui Oatley; John Strong; Kate Scott; Jenn Hildreth	Aly Wagner; Lori Lindsey; Kyndra de St. Aubin; Danielle Slaton; Warren Barton	Jenny Taft; Tom Rinaldi	Rob Stone; Jenny Taft; Jimmy Conrad (World Cup Now on Twitter)	Alexi Lalas, Carli Lloyd, Karina LeBlanc, Kate Gill, Heather O'Reilly, Ariane Hingst and Stuart Holden; Mark Clattenburg and Dr. Joe Machnik (rules analyst); Chris Fallica (Wagering expert); Melissa Ortiz and Leslie Osborne (World Cup Now on Twitter)
2022 World Cup	John Strong; Derek Rae; JP Dellacamera; Ian Darke; Jacqui Oatley	Stuart Holden; Aly Wagner; Cobi Jones; Landon Donovan; Warren Barton	Geoff Shreeves (on loan from Sky Sports UK); Tom Rinaldi; Rodolfo Landeros; Jenny Taft; Melissa Ortiz (World Cup Now on Twitter)	Rob Stone; Jenny Taft; Kate Abdo	Alexi Lalas, Carli Lloyd, Clint Dempsey, Landon Donovan, Maurice Edu, Aly Wagner, Stuart Holden, Kelly Smith, and Eniola Aluko; Mark Clattenburg and Dr. Joe Machnik (rules analyst); Maurice Edu and Chad Johnson (World Cup Tonight); DaMarcus Beasley, Sacha Kljestan, Melissa Ortiz, Cobi Jones, Warren Barton, Derek Rae and Maurice Edu (World Cup Now on Twitter)
2022 Copa América Femenina	JP Dellacamera; John Strong; Callum Williams	Aly Wagner; Lori Lindsey; Kyndra de St. Aubin; Cat Whitehill			
2021 Copa America	John Strong; Jake Zivin; Kate Scott; Adrian Garcia Marquez	Stuart Holden; Mariano Trujillo; Warren Barton		Rob Stone	Alexi Lalas, Aly Wagner, Maurice Edu, Cobi Jones and Dr. Joe Machnik (rules analyst)
2019 Women's World Cup	JP Dellacamera; Derek Rae; Jenn Hildreth; Glenn Davis; Lisa Byington	Aly Wagner; Danielle Slaton; Kyndra de St. Aubin; Angela Hucles; Cat Whitehill	Alex Curry; Grant Wahl	Rob Stone and Jenny Taft (Paris); Kate Abdo (Los Angeles); Aaron West (digital)	Alexi Lalas, Eniola Aluko, Ariane Hingst, Kate Gill, Karina LeBlanc, Heather O'Reilly and Kelly Smith (Paris); Leslie Osborne, Christie Pearce Rampone and Maurice Edu (Los Angeles); Christina Unkel (rules analyst)
2018 World Cup	John Strong; JP Dellacamera; Derek Rae; Glenn Davis; Jorge Perez-Navarro; Mark Followill	Stuart Holden; Tony Meola; Aly Wagner; Cobi Jones; Mariano Trujillo; Warren Barton	Geoff Shreeves; Jenny Taft; Rodolfo Landeros; Maria Komandnaya; Sergey Gordeev; Grant Wahl	Rob Stone; Kate Abdo; Ian Joy; Rachel Bonnetta (digital)	Alexi Lalas, Hernan Crespo, Clarence Seedorf, Moisés Muñoz, Fernando Fiore, Martin O'Neill, Guus Hiddink, Kelly Smith, Ian Wright, and Dr. Joe Machnik (rules analyst)
2017 Confederations Cup	John Strong; JP Dellacamera; Jorge Perez-Navarro	Stuart Holden; Cobi Jones; Mariano Trujillo	Maria Komandnaya; Francisco X. Rivera; Sergey Gordeev	Rob Stone; Kate Abdo	Alexi Lalas, Eric Wynalda, Guus Hiddink, Lothar Matthäus, Arne Friedrich, Ian Wright, Aly Wagner, Cobi Jones, Mariano Trujillo, Fernando Fiore, and Dr. Joe Machnik (rules analyst)
2016 Copa America	John Strong; JP Dellacamera; Justin Kutcher; Mark Followill	Brad Friedel; Stuart Holden; Cobi Jones; Herculez Gomez	Jenny Taft; Kyndra de St. Aubin; Francisco X. Rivera; Grant Wahl (at-large)	Rob Stone	Alexi Lalas, Landon Donovan, Eric Wynalda, Fernando Fiore, Aly Wagner, Herculez Gomez, and Dr. Joe Machnik (rules analyst)
2015 Women's World Cup	JP Dellacamera; Justin Kutcher; Jenn Hildreth; Glenn Davis; John Strong	Tony DiCicco and Cat Whitehill; Aly Wagner; Kyndra de St. Aubin; Christine Latham; Angela Hucles; Danielle Slaton	Jenny Taft; Julie Stewart-Binks; Grant Wahl	Rob Stone; Kate Abdo	Alexi Lalas, Heather Mitts, Eric Wynalda, Mónica González, Ariane Hingst, Angela Hucles, Christine Latham, Leslie Osborne, Kelly Smith, Stuart Holden, and Dr. Joe Machnik (rules analyst)
