= MLS on Fox =

- Starring: John Strong; Stuart Holden; Alexi Lalas; Rob Stone
- Country of origin: United States

Production
- Running time: 2 or 2.5 hours

Original release
- Network: Fox; FS1; Fox Deportes
- Release: 2003 – 2011; 2015 – present

MLS on Fox is the branding used for broadcasts of Major League Soccer (MLS) on FS1 and Fox. Fox Sports first aired MLS games from 2003–2011 on the now defunct Fox Soccer Channel. Fox then won the rights from NBC Sports to air games on the new Fox Sports 1 and the MLS Cup on Fox in even numbered years from 2015 until 2022. Since 2023, Fox is the only broadcaster simulcasting MLS from MLS Season Pass after ESPN and Univision rejected to simulcast, and will be the exclusive linear home of MLS Cup.

== History ==
In 2003, Fox Sports World began airing MLS games as the secondary cable broadcast partner. In 2012, NBC Sports beat out Fox to air the MLS as the secondary cable partner. Then in 2015, Fox won the rights to air games and the MLS Cup in even numbered years. John Strong was named the network's main voice for their coverage until 2022, when Fox Sports lost the main rights to Apple TV. However, after talks broke down with both Univision and ESPN, Fox will be the sole linear broadcasting partner for the league from 2023 onward. Under the new deal, Fox will air 34 MLS matches (15 on the Fox network and the rest on FS1), eight playoff games, and each MLS Cup through the 2026 season. These matches will also air in Spanish on Fox Deportes, FS2, and via SAP on most local FOX stations.

== Personalities ==
With MLS and Apple TV controlling all inventory for broadcasts from 2023 onward, Fox will simulcast games from the Apple broadcasts, adding their own announcers on a main feed, however, FOX and FS1 broadcasts still use their own theme and branding separate from the Apple-exclusive broadcasts. This is a list of personalities from the time MLS matches were produced by Fox itself.

=== Current ===
==== Play-by-play announcers ====
1. John Strong (2015–present)
2. JP Dellacamera (2011, 2015–present)
3. Derek Rae (2019–present)
4. Keith Costigan (2019–present)
5. Adrian Garcia Marquez (2019–present)
6. Kate Scott (2021–present)
7. Nate Bukaty (2021–present)
8. Tyler Terens (2023–present)
9. Mike Watts (2024–present)
10. Joe Malfa (2024–present)
11. Josh Eastern (2024–present)
12. Luis Omar Tapia (2024–present)
13. Michael Wottreng (2024–present)
14. Josh Appel (2025–present)
15. Neil Sika (2025–present)

==== Color commentators ====
1. Stuart Holden (2017–present)
2. Tony Meola (2015–present)
3. Aly Wagner (2017–present)
4. Maurice Edu (2018–present)
5. Cobi Jones (2018–present)
6. Warren Barton (2020–present)
7. Landon Donovan (2022–present)
8. Lori Lindsey (2023–present)
9. Devon Kerr (2023–present)
10. Jamie Watson (2024–present)
11. Lloyd Sam (2025–present)

==== Studio team ====
- Rob Stone: Lead studio host (2015–present)
- Jenny Taft: Studio host (2021–present)
- Alexi Lalas: Lead studio analyst (2015–present)
- Stuart Holden Studio analyst (2015–2017; 2021–present)
- Maurice Edu: Studio analyst (2018–present)
- Rodolfo Landeros: Secondary studio host (2021–present)
- Joe Machnik: rules analyst (2015–present)

=== Former ===
==== Play-by-play announcers ====
1. Mark Followill (2018–2022)
2. Lisa Byington (2018; DCU v NE only)
3. Jake Zivin (2020–2022)
4. Jenn Hilldreth (2019; DCU v SKC only)
5. Callum Williams (2022)

==== Color commentators ====
1. Danielle Slaton (2018–2021)
2. Cat Whitehill (2019; DCU v SKC only)
3. Brad Friedel (2015–2017)
4. Landon Donovan (2016–2017, 2022)
5. Kyle Martino (2011)
6. Brian Dunseth (2015–2017)
7. Eric Wynalda (2006–2011)

==== Sideline reporters ====
- Grant Wahl (2015–2016)
- Julie Stewart-Binks (2015–2016)
- Katie Witham (2017–2020)
- Marisa Pilla (2020)
- Kyndra de St. Aubin (2022; post-season only)

==== Studio team ====
- Sara Walsh: Secondary studio host (2019–2022)
- Sean Wheelock (2005–2011)
- Christian Miles (2007–2010)
- Eric Wynalda: studio analyst (2016–2018)

== See also ==
- Major League Soccer on television
