= Jenn Hildreth =

American sports commentator

- Born: Norwood, New York, U.S.
- Education: Emory University
- Occupation: Broadcaster
- Years active: 2001–present
- Employer: Freelance
- Known for: Sports commentary - "Let's Love the Game!"

Jenn Hildreth is an American sports commentator best known for her work as a soccer play-by-play announcer for English-language broadcasts of the FIFA Women's World Cup, National Women's Soccer League (NWSL), and Major League Soccer in the United States. She is known for her Latin American-style signature first half kickoff catchphrase "Let's love the game!"

== Early life ==
Hildreth is from Norwood, New York. She graduated from Norwood-Norfolk High School in 1995, where she was a multi-sport athlete.

=== Education ===
Hildreth attended Emory University from 1995 to 1999, where she participated in the university's soccer team as a goalkeeper, basketball team, and in track and field. As a goalkeeper, she played 1,457 minutes in 20 appearances, made 61 saves, and allowed 18 goals with a 11–8–1 record in 1997, and played 578 minutes in 5 appearances, made 7 saves, and allowed 7 goals with a 3–2–0 record in 1995. She had a total of four shutouts in her career.

== Journalism career ==
After graduating from Emory in 1999, Hildreth covered high-school sports at The Atlanta Journal-Constitution for two years before moving to sports commentary.

== Sports commentary career ==
After working for Atlanta-area sports production companies, Hildreth moved to regional sports network Fox Sports South in 2001 to work as a reporter and host on weekly Southeastern Conference (SEC) and Atlantic Coast Conference (ACC) shows.

Hildreth has worked on broadcast crews for the Atlanta Beat of the Women's United Soccer Association, as a color commentator for Women's Professional Soccer on Fox Soccer Channel, the Atlanta Braves as a dugout reporter for regional sports networks Fox Sports South and Fox Sports Southeast, the 2015-16 NCAA Division I men's basketball season and ACC football, soccer, basketball, and softball games for ESPN, the SEC Network, and the ACC Network, 2015, 2019 and 2023 FIFA Women's World Cups for Fox Sports, the 2020 Summer Olympics for NBC, the NCAA Division I women's soccer tournament from 2016 to 2022, 2021 and 2022 Women's International Champions Cups, and UEFA Women's Euro 2022 for ESPN, and the 2023 NCAA Division I women's basketball tournament for ESPN.

In 2015, Atlanta Braves player Adonis García hit Hildreth with an errant throw, sparking a discussion about fan safety in stadiums.

As of 2023, Hildreth is a voter on the United States National Soccer Hall of Fame Players Selection Committee, which votes on new entrants to the hall.

=== FIFA Women's World Cup, 2015– ===
Hildreth's assignment as play-by-play announcer for the 2015 FIFA Women's World Cup was intended to end after the quarterfinals, but Fox Sports unexpectedly retained her for the semifinals. It was among Hildreth's first major play-by-play assignments, having primarily served as a reporter or analyst until 2014. Her return for the 2019 FIFA Women's World Cup, paired with analyst Kyndra de St. Aubin, represented Fox Sports's only all-woman broadcast pairing of the tournament and was well-reviewed by media critics.

=== National Women's Soccer League, 2015– ===
Hildreth has been part of National Women's Soccer League broadcast crews as a play-by-play announcer in 2015, 2016, 2017, 2018, 2019, 2020, 2021, and 2022, across ESPN, Fox Sports, and Lifetime. Her work included calling play-by-play for the English-language national broadcasts of the 2015, 2016, 2017, 2018, 2019, 2021, and 2022 NWSL championship matches, and the championship match of the 2020 NWSL Challenge Cup. Hildreth's role as play-by-play announcer alongside Aly Wagner for the opening match of the 2020 Challenge Cup was the first such nationally televised broadcast of live team sports in the United States after the start of the COVID-19 pandemic.

Hildreth became the lead English-language play-by-play commentator of ESPN's coverage (in the USA and the Caribbean) of the NWSL starting with the 2024 season. She is usually alongside former English national team forward Lianne Sanderson as her match analyst.

=== Major League Soccer, 2019–2023 ===
On Mother's Day, Sunday, May 12, 2019, Hildreth was part of the second all-female commentary crew for a Major League Soccer match, between D.C. United and Sporting Kansas City alongside Cat Whitehill and Jillian Sakovits.

On February 8, 2023, Hildreth was announced by MLS Productions as a member of the Major League Soccer broadcasting team for Apple TV. She has been a member of 4 all-female MLS Productions English-language commentary teams, having worked alongside Lori Lindsey, Kyndra de St. Aubin, Jill Loyden and Danielle Slaton.

On July 15, 2023, Hildreth unveiled her Latin American-style signature first half kickoff catchphrase "Let's love the game!" for the first half kickoff of the Real Salt Lake vs New York Red Bulls MLS match on Apple TV, alongside former U.S. international goalkeeper Jill Loyden.

Hildreth departed MLS Productions at the end of the 2023 MLS regular season in order to become the lead English-language play-by-play commentator for ESPN's coverage (in the USA and the Caribbean) of the NWSL during the 2024 season.

== Personal life ==
Hildreth lives in Atlanta, Georgia, with her husband Chris, who works for ESPN in sales. They have two daughters, Ashley and Madison. Her father Joseph was an art professor at State University of New York at Potsdam, and her mother Sandra is an artist in Saranac Lake, New York.
