= Soccer on TNT Sports =

- Genre: Soccer telecasts
- Theme music composer: Jon Batiste
- Opening theme: We Are
- Country of origin: United States
- Original language: English

Production
- Production location: Atlanta, Georgia
- Camera setup: Multi-camera
- Running time: 3+ hours (or until game ends)
- Production company: Turner

Original release
- Network: TNT; TruTV; TBS; HBO Max

TNT Sports, on TNT, TBS, TruTV and HBO Max, have aired soccer matches in the United States since 1990. Currently, TNT Sports holds the rights to matches primarily featuring the USSF and the FIFA Club World Cup. Previously, matches from the FIFA World Cup, Women's United Soccer Association, UEFA Champions League, UEFA Europa League and Liverpool F.C. have been aired by TNT Sports.

== Overview ==
=== 1990 FIFA World Cup and WUSA ===
Turner Sports aired the 1990 FIFA World Cup live on TNT in the United States. The tournament was hosted by Ernie Johnson. Bob Neal and Mick Luckhurst served as the lead broadcast team. Meanwhile, JP Dellacamera and Randy Hahn were the other play-by-play announcers with Rick Davis and Ty Keough were the other color commentators. Also, utilized by TNT for the 1990 World Cup was Craig Sager and Paul Ryden.

TNT broadcast the first Women's United Soccer Association (WUSA) game on April 21, 2001, which was contest between the Atlanta Beat and New York Power at Bobby Dodd Stadium in Atlanta. Former U.S. national team member Wendy Gebauer Palladino helped called the game alongside broadcaster JP Dellacamera and American soccer great Michelle Akers. About 22 games were scheduled to be broadcast nationally on TNT or CNN/SI in 2001. 15 games were initially expected to be shown on TNT and seven games on CNN/SI over the course of June to August. The deal included broadcast of playoffs and the championship game, the Founders Cup. During a four-year span, TNT and CNN/SI were due to televise at least 88 games, under a $3 million TV contract. After the 2001 season, the WUSA opted out of its four-year agreement to go with a two-year pact with the Pax network.

=== UEFA Club Rights (2017–2019) ===
In 2017, Turner Sports announced that they had acquired the rights to air all of the matches from the UEFA Champions League live. The contract originally ran from 2018–2021. Tuner later announced that they would air 4 matches per week on TNT and the remainder of the matches on new streaming service B/R Live. All matches will be commentated through world feed. During the 2019-2020 season, Turner Sports opted out from the rest of the contract after airing 12 round of 16 matches, eventually giving up the rights. It eventually moved to CBS Sports where it became the rightsholder for English-language Broadcasts of the UEFA Champions League.

Additionally, Turner Sports also carried the UEFA Europa League and the UEFA Super Cup through the same contract as the Champions League programming. In 2019, Turner Sports aired three Liverpool F.C. pre-season matches during July. Two matches aired on TNT while one was exclusively broadcast on B/R Live.

=== United States Soccer Federation (2022–present) ===
In 2022, Turner Sports announced an agreement with the United States Soccer Federation to air USMNT and USWNT matches from 2023 to 2030, replacing ESPN/ABC and Fox Sports, as part of an 8-year deal. Luke Wileman will handling play-by-play duties, while Sara Walsh hosting studio coverage and Melissa Ortiz reporting on sideline. Joined them as co-commentator or studio analysts will be Julie Foudy, DaMarcus Beasley, Shannon Boxx and Kyle Martino. The agreement includes the rights to the SheBelieves Cup, with non USWNT matches airing exclusively on Max.

=== Expansion of soccer coverage (2024–present) ===
In 2024, the now rebranded TNT Sports expanded its coverage by airing a match featuring U.S. Women's Deaf National Team, two matches featuring the Argentina national team and two preseason soccer matches on TruTV.

In 2025, TNT Sports announced a sublicense agreement with DAZN to acquire the rights to 24 matches, including the final, of the 2025 FIFA Club World Cup. Luke Wileman, Tony Husband, Andres Cantor and Kevin Egan served as play-by-play commentators for the coverage, while Brian Dunseth, Steve McManaman and Brad Guzan served as color commentators. Studio coverage, which despite airing on all DAZN matches originated from TNT Sports' studios, featured hosts Alex Scott, Lauren Jbara and Katie Witham, alongside analysts Juan Pablo Angel, Mo Adams, Melissa Ortiz, Conor Coady, Kei Kamara, Lutz Pfannenstiel, Pellegrino Matarazzo and BJ Callaghan.

Later in 2025, TNT Sports announced an agreement with World Sevens Football to broadcast and produce coverage of the upcoming 7v7 Soccer Tournament in North America. The tournament will feature Kansas City Current and San Diego Wave FC from the NWSL, Mexico's Club América and Tigres UANL, Canada's AFC Toronto, Brazil's CR Flamengo, Colombia's Deportivo Cali, and Uruguay's Club Nacional de Football.

== On-air staff ==
=== Play-by-play ===
- Luke Wileman, lead USNT play-by-play (2023–present)
- JP Dellacamera, secondary USWNT play-by-play (2023–present)
- Kevin Egan, alternate play-by-play (2025)

=== Color ===
- Kyle Martino, lead men's color (2023–present)
- Julie Foudy, lead women's color (2023–present)

=== Field reporters ===
- Melissa Ortiz, lead reporter and women's analyst (2023–present)
- Katie Witham, secondary reporter and alternat host (2024)

=== Studio ===
- Sara Walsh, lead USNT host
- Liam McHugh, alternate men's host
- Katie Witham, secondary reporter and alternat host (2024)
- Shannon Boxx, lead women's analyst
- Becky Sauerbrunn, women's analyst
- Melissa Ortiz, lead reporter and women's analyst (2023–present)
- Damarcus Beasley, lead men's analyst
- Brad Guzan, lead men's analyst
- Brian Dunseth, lead men's analyst
