= Dave Johnson (sportscaster) =

American radio sports broadcaster

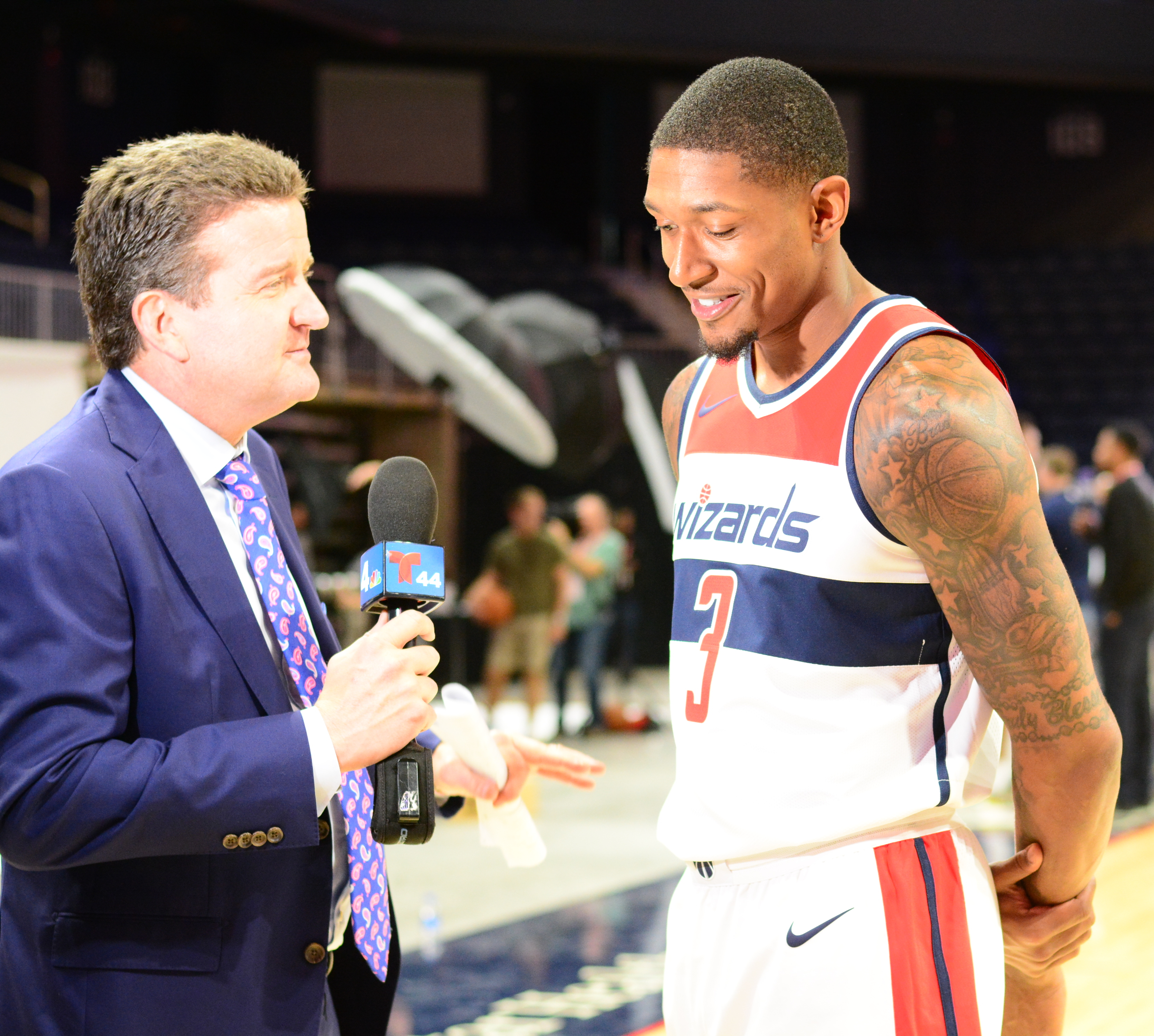
Dave Johnson and Bradley Beal (2018)

Dave Johnson is an American radio personality. He is the current sports director and morning sports anchor for 103.5 WTOP-FM in Washington, D.C. Johnson first arrived at WTOP in 1989; left in 1992, but returned in 1995.

In addition to WTOP, Johnson is the radio play-by-play voice of the NBA's Washington Wizards, and host of the team's weekly television show. Johnson also regularly anchors Comcast SportsNet's news show Geico SportsNet Central.

Johnson was the English-language television play-by-play voice of Major League Soccer's D.C. United on WJLA-TV, previously on Comcast SportsNet. Johnson called the D.C. United games starting when the team and the league began play in 1996, and Johnson became known for his signature call "It's in the net!" when D.C. United scores. His TV tenure ended in October 2022 with Apple TV providing the broadcast teams for the next season but he continues broadcasting as the voice of the DC United radio network.

Johnson was the play-by-play announcer for XM radio for several 2006 World Cup matches including the 2006 Final, and has covered soccer matches for ESPN.

Johnson received an Emmy as host of the NHL's Washington Capitals Face Off television show and additionally served for three years as the sideline reporter for the Capitals' television coverage on Home Team Sports.

Johnson has also done television play-by-play of college football, NBA basketball, college basketball and lacrosse. He occasionally covers sports for WRC-TV.

Johnson graduated from Towson University, and lives in Maryland.
