= Matt Buschmann =

American baseball player & coach (born 1984)

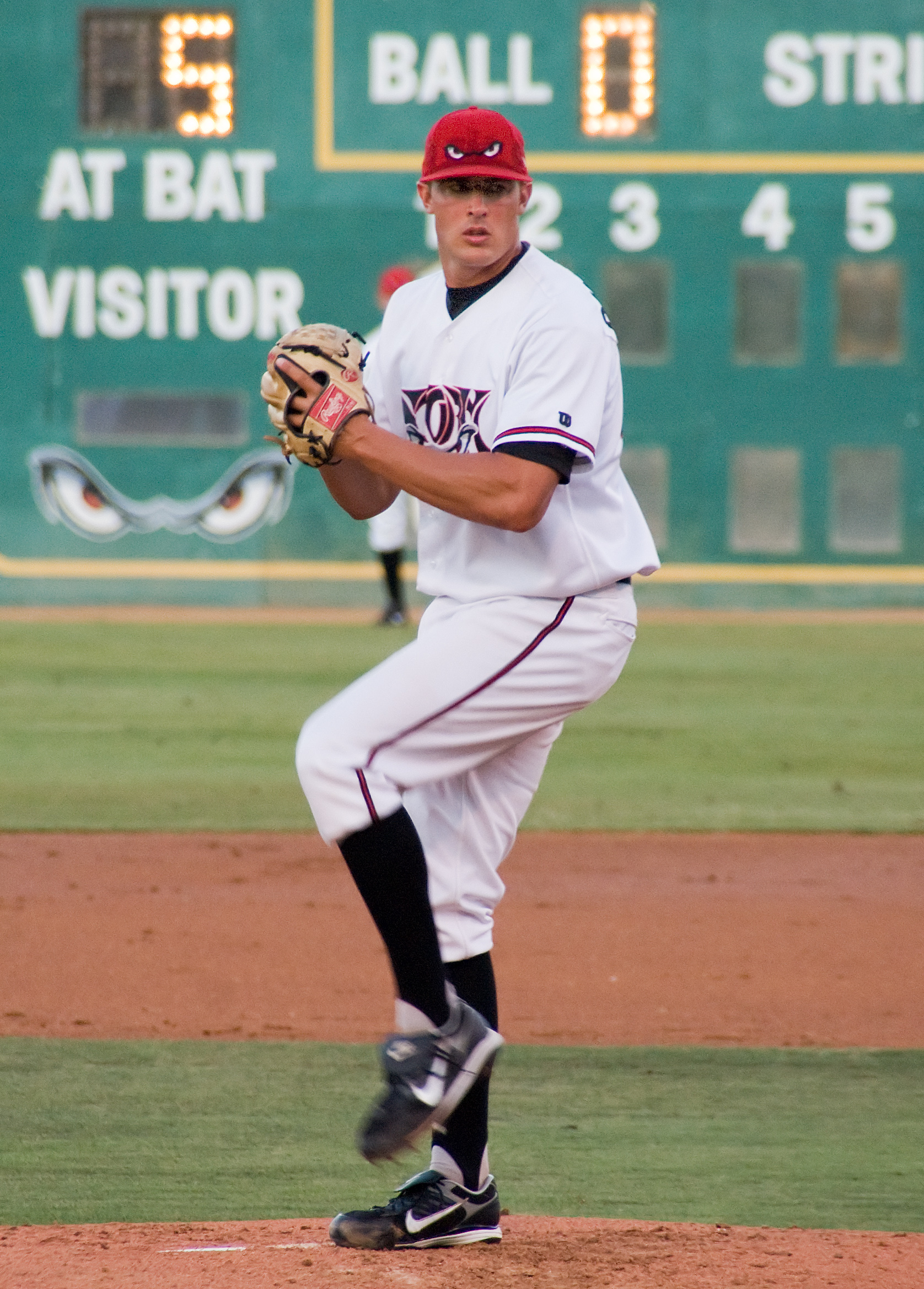
- Buschman pitching for the Lake Elsinore Storm in 2007

Colorado Rockies – No. 73
- Pitcher / Coach
- Born: February 13, 1984 (age 42); St. Louis, Missouri, U.S.
- Batted: Right Threw: Right

MLB debut
- April 10, 2016, for the Arizona Diamondbacks

Last MLB appearance
- April 16, 2016, for the Arizona Diamondbacks

MLB statistics
- Win–loss record: 0–0
- Earned run average: 2.08
- Strikeouts: 3
- Stats at Baseball Reference

Teams
- As player: Arizona Diamondbacks (2016); As coach: Toronto Blue Jays (2019–2022); Colorado Rockies (2026–present)

Matthew David Buschmann (born February 13, 1984) is an American former professional baseball pitcher who currently serves as the bullpen coach for the Colorado Rockies of Major League Baseball (MLB). He played in MLB for the Arizona Diamondbacks in 2016. He served as the bullpen coach for the Toronto Blue Jays from 2019 to 2022.

== Amateur career ==
Buschmann attended Lafayette High School in Wildwood, Missouri, and then Vanderbilt University, where he played college baseball for the Vanderbilt Commodores primarily as a relief pitcher his first three seasons. He was 5–2 with 5 saves and a 3.86 ERA as a freshman at Vanderbilt in 2003 and participated in a combined perfect game in May, then 8–1 with 2 saves and a 2.84 ERA as a sophomore in 2004. He helped lead the team to the 2004 Southeastern Conference baseball tournament finals, though the club was beaten by South Carolina. After the 2004 season, he played collegiate summer baseball with the Hyannis Mets of the Cape Cod Baseball League. In 2005, he was 4–3 with a 3.47 ERA and a save. In his senior year, 2006, Buschmann was 3–3 with a 4.27 ERA in 7 starts. Overall, he was 20–9 with a 3.50 ERA in 79 games (26 starts) in his four-year collegiate career. He helped lead Vanderbilt to the 2006 Southeastern Conference baseball tournament, with the team losing to Ole Miss in the finals. He was also named to the SEC Baseball Good Works Team that year.

== Professional career ==
=== San Diego Padres ===
Buschmann was drafted in the 15th round, with the 453rd overall selection, of the 2006 Major League Baseball draft by the San Diego Padres. He was signed by scout Ash Lawson, and began his professional career that year. Buschmann split the summer between the Low–A Eugene Emeralds and High–A Lake Elsinore Storm, going a combined 4–4 with a 3.19 ERA in 17 games (12 starts). With the Storm again in 2007, he was 12–6 with a 2.89 ERA in 28 games (25 starts). Buschmann was California League Post-Season All-Star and earned two Pitcher of the Week honors that season. In 2008, he was 10–6 with a 2.98 ERA in 27 starts for the Double–A San Antonio Missions and earned a spot on the Texas League's Mid- and Post-Season All-Star squads. He was, according to The Baseball Cube, the best pitcher in the league that season.

Buschmann dropped to 5–11 with a 5.66 ERA in 35 games (21 starts) in 2009, split between the Missions and Triple–A Portland Beavers. In his first trial at Triple–A, he was 3–10 with a 6.18 ERA. In 2010, Buschmann was 2–6 with a 5.01 ERA in 40 games (9 starts) between the Missions and Beavers. He had 94 strikeouts in 91 2/3 innings that year, the first time in his career he averaged more than a strikeout per inning. In 2011, he was 12–6 with a 6.16 ERA in 32 games (22 starts) between San Antonio and the Tucson Padres, San Diego's new Triple–A club.

=== Tampa Bay Rays ===
On December 8, 2011, the Washington Nationals selected Buschmann in the minor league phase of the Rule 5 Draft, though the team traded him to the Tampa Bay Rays in exchange for cash considerations on April 16, 2012. He pitched for the Double–A Montgomery Biscuits and Triple–A Durham Bulls in 2012 and went 7–8 with a 3.98 ERA in 26 games (24 starts). In May, he earned a Southern League Pitcher of the Week honor. With Montgomery and Durham again in 2013, he went 14–5 with a 2.86 ERA in 29 games (28 starts), striking out 167 batters in 160 2/3 innings. He became a free agent following the 2013 campaign.

=== Oakland Athletics ===
On November 20, 2013, Buschmann signed a minor league contract with the Oakland Athletics. He went 10–7 with a 4.40 ERA in 25 games (24 starts) for the Triple–A Sacramento River Cats; he also had 134 strikeouts in 143 1/3 innings. Buschmann re-signed with Oakland on a minor league contract on November 24, 2014.

=== Tampa Bay Rays (second stint) ===
On April 2, 2015, Buschmann was traded to the Tampa Bay Rays in exchange for cash considerations. He made 13 starts for the Triple–A Durham Bulls, compiling a 6–5 record and 3.89 ERA with 63 strikeouts across 78 2/3 innings pitched. Buschmann was released by the organization on June 19.

=== Cincinnati Reds ===
On June 22, 2015, Buschmann signed a minor league contract with the Cincinnati Reds. He started nine games for the Triple–A Louisville Bats and went 2–5 with a 4.25 ERA and 44 strikeouts.

=== Baltimore Orioles ===
On August 11, 2015, Buschmann was traded to the Baltimore Orioles in exchange for cash considerations, and made one start for the Triple–A Norfolk Tides. He was 8–10 with a 4.08 ERA in 23 starts that year. In August of that year, he was a guest columnist for ESPN.com, penning an article called "What baseball might look like in the year 2045." Adam Sobsey of Grantland.com wrote a feature piece on Buschmann in August, as well, asking "will the minor league strikeout king ever reach the majors?" He became a free agent following the season on November 6.

=== Arizona Diamondbacks ===
On December 11, 2015, Buschmann signed a minor league contract with the Arizona Diamondbacks. He subsequently earned an invitation to major league spring training.

On April 7, 2016, Buschmann was promoted to the major leagues for the first time after pitcher Kyle Drabek was designated for assignment. He made his major league debut on April 10, facing the Chicago Cubs. Buschmann pitched a scoreless top of the ninth inning, allowing only a base hit to Munenori Kawasaki. He made three appearances for Arizona, logging a 2.08 ERA with 3 strikeouts over 4 1/3 innings pitched. Buschmann was designated for assignment on April 29, and outrighted to the Triple-A Reno Aces on May 3. In 25 games (23 starts) for Reno, he accumulated an 8–10 record and 5.26 ERA with 91 strikeouts across 142 innings pitched. Buschmann elected free agency following the season on November 7.

=== Toronto Blue Jays ===
On February 28, 2017, Buschmann signed a minor league contract with the Toronto Blue Jays, and was assigned to the Triple-A Buffalo Bisons. He did not appear in any games for the Bisons in 2017.

== Post-playing career ==
=== San Francisco Giants ===
On December 17, 2017, Buschmann was hired by the San Francisco Giants organization as an assistant director of player development.

=== Toronto Blue Jays ===
On November 26, 2018, Buschmann was hired by the Toronto Blue Jays as their bullpen coach.

Buschmann caught Aaron Judge's AL record-tying 61st home run while working the bullpen for the Toronto Blue Jays.

After four years in the role, on January 15, 2023, Buschmann left the Blue Jays organization to pursue other opportunities. He had also served as director of pitching development since 2020.

=== Colorado Rockies ===
On December 9, 2025, the Colorado Rockies hired Buschmann to serve as the team's bullpen coach.

== Personal life ==
Buschmann is married to sportscaster Sara Walsh. David Price, a former teammate of Buschmann's, was the "matchmaker." On February 3, 2017, Buschmann announced the birth of twins, Hutton and Brees.

== See also ==
- Rule 5 draft results
