= Ian Joy =

American soccer player (born 1981)

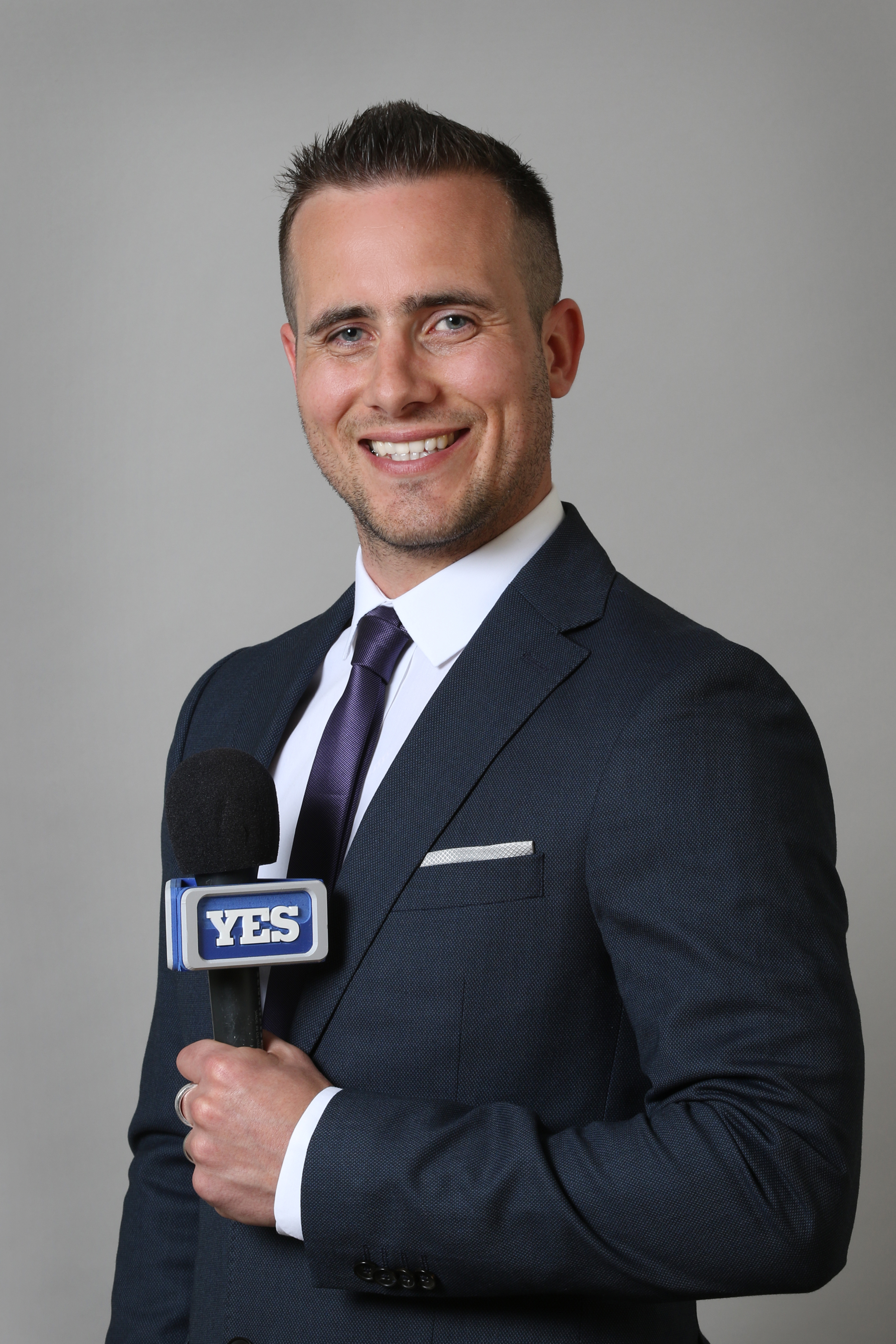

Personal information
- Full name: Ian Paul Joy
- Date of birth: July 14, 1981 (age 45)
- Place of birth: San Diego, California, USA
- Height: 5 ft 9 in (1.75 m)
- Position: Left back

Youth career
- 1997–1998: Tranmere Rovers

Senior career*
Years	Team	Apps	(Gls)
1998–2000	Tranmere Rovers	0	(0)
2000	Stirling Albion	2	(0)
2000–2001	Montrose	25	(2)
2001–2003	Kidderminster Harriers	22	(0)
2003	Chester City	3	(0)
2003–2005	Hamburger SV II	34	(0)
2005–2008	FC St. Pauli	89	(1)
2008–2009	Real Salt Lake	20	(0)
2009	FC Ingolstadt 04	3	(0)
2010	Portland Timbers	21	(0)
Total		219	(3)

International career
- USA U17
- USA U18
- USA U20
- USA U23
- * Club domestic league appearances and goals

Ian Paul Joy (born July 14, 1981) is an American-born Scottish sports broadcaster and former professional footballer.

== Early and personal life ==
Born in San Diego, California, Joy is the son of English former professional player Brian Joy. His mother is Scottish and he grew up in Scotland from the age of 3. Joy lived in Bo'ness and attended Deanburn Primary School and Bo'ness Academy. Joy is a fan of Manchester United F.C.

== Playing career ==
Joy played as a left back for Tranmere Rovers, Stirling Albion, Montrose, Kidderminster Harriers, Chester City, Hamburger SV II, FC St. Pauli, Real Salt Lake, FC Ingolstadt 04 and Portland Timbers.

As a 15-year-old, he featured for the United States U-17 team on a three-match week long tour of Germany in 1997. Joy went on to represent the USA Youth national teams at U-18, U-20 and U-23 level. He captained the USA U-18's at the World Youth Games in Moscow, Russia in 1998.

== Media ==
After retiring as a player in 2011, Joy became a sportscaster for beIN Sports. In 2015 he became the studio host of Fox Sports' coverage of the Bundesliga, FA Cup, Champions League and Europa League. In April 2018, Joy was named as a studio host for FOX's coverage of the 2018 FIFA World Cup.

On March 25, 2020, Joy announced on Twitter he would be leaving Fox Sports.

Joy is a part of the YES Network covering New York sports after joining the network in 2015.

As of August 5, 2020, Joy serves as a soccer analyst for CBS Sports as part of the network's UEFA Champions League and Europa League coverage on CBS Sports HQ.
