= John Strong (sportscaster) =

American television play-by-play broadcaster

- Born: June 20, 1985 (age 41)
- Education: University of Oregon
- Occupation: Broadcaster
- Employer: Fox Sports
- Spouse: Nicole (Wilcox) Strong

John Strong is an American television play-by-play broadcaster who is the lead play-by-play voice for MLS on Fox. His work has appeared on NBC, Fox, ESPN among other networks. He is a former radio host on 750-AM "The Game" in Portland, Oregon and was the radio and television play-by-play announcer for the Portland Timbers Major League Soccer team.

== Broadcasting career ==
Strong began his broadcasting career while in high school at Lake Oswego High School, where he founded Laker Broadcasting. Strong created audio broadcasts of LOHS football and basketball games beginning in 2002.

While attending School of Journalism and Communication at the University of Oregon, Strong worked at 750 KXL in Portland and was active at Oregon's campus station, KWVA. Strong continued his play-by-play work by broadcasting University of Oregon women's soccer, softball, and women's lacrosse. He also served as play-by-play voice for the Eugene Generals Junior Hockey team in 2005-06.

Strong's first full-time broadcast job came at Portland's KXL radio and, later, 750 AM "The Game" in 2008. Strong produced "The Bald Faced Truth" radio show and also hosted a daily evening radio show called "Strong at Night" for the station.

In 2010, Strong was the play-by-play announcer for the Portland Timbers and in 2011 became the regular play-by-play announcer for Timbers broadcasts on FSN Northwest. He was a regular commentator on Europa League games for Fox Soccer, notably calling the 2013 UEFA Europa League Final between Chelsea and Benfica. After the 2012–13 season, he moved to NBC Sports to cover Major League Soccer and Premier League football. After NBC's loss of Major League Soccer coverage to Fox Sports in 2014, it was announced that Strong was moving full-time to Fox Sports to head the Major League Soccer, and Women's World Cup coverage. Strong was previously working part-time for Fox when he was not obligated to his NBC duties. In 2015, Strong also began to serve as the lead play-by-play voice for most United States men's national soccer team matches broadcast on Fox/Fox Sports 1 because of a new television contract between U.S. Soccer, Fox Sports, and ESPN/ABC. Brad Friedel and later Stuart Holden joined him as the lead color commentator for these matches. He and lead color commentator Stuart Holden called the Fox broadcast of the 2018 FIFA World Cup and 2022 FIFA World Cup, including the finals for both 2018 and 2022.

=== TV credits ===
- MLS: 2012–2014 (NBCSN), 2015–present (Fox Sports)
- FIFA Women's World Cup: 2015, 2023 (Fox Sports)
- UEFA Europa League: 2014–2016 (Fox Sports)
- UEFA Champions League: 2016–2018 (Fox Sports)
- FIFA World Cup: 2018, 2022, 2026 (Fox Sports)
- Copa América: 2016, 2021, 2024 (Fox Sports)

== Honors ==
In 2013, Strong was named Oregon Sportscaster of the Year by the National Sportscasters and Sportswriters Association. In 2011, he was awarded Major League Soccer’s Broadcast Call of the Year for his play-by-play call of midfielder Darlington Nagbe’s goal against Sporting Kansas City on July 2, 2011, at Jeld-Wen Field in Portland. Strong’s call has been viewed nearly two million times on YouTube.com and following the season was named the Timbers’ 2011 Play of the Year.

== Personal life ==
Strong is married to Nicole Strong, a former Washington State University soccer player who led the Women's Premier Soccer League in goals scored in 2011. She previously coached the Central Catholic High School girls' soccer team and was named the Mt. Hood Conference Coach of the Year after winning a league title in 2012.

Media offices
| Preceded by Adrian Healey | MLS Cup play-by-play announcer 2016–present (concurrent with ABC's Adrian Healey and Jon Champion in even numbered years from 2016–2022) | Succeeded by Incumbent |
