= Stuart Holden =

American soccer player (born 1985)

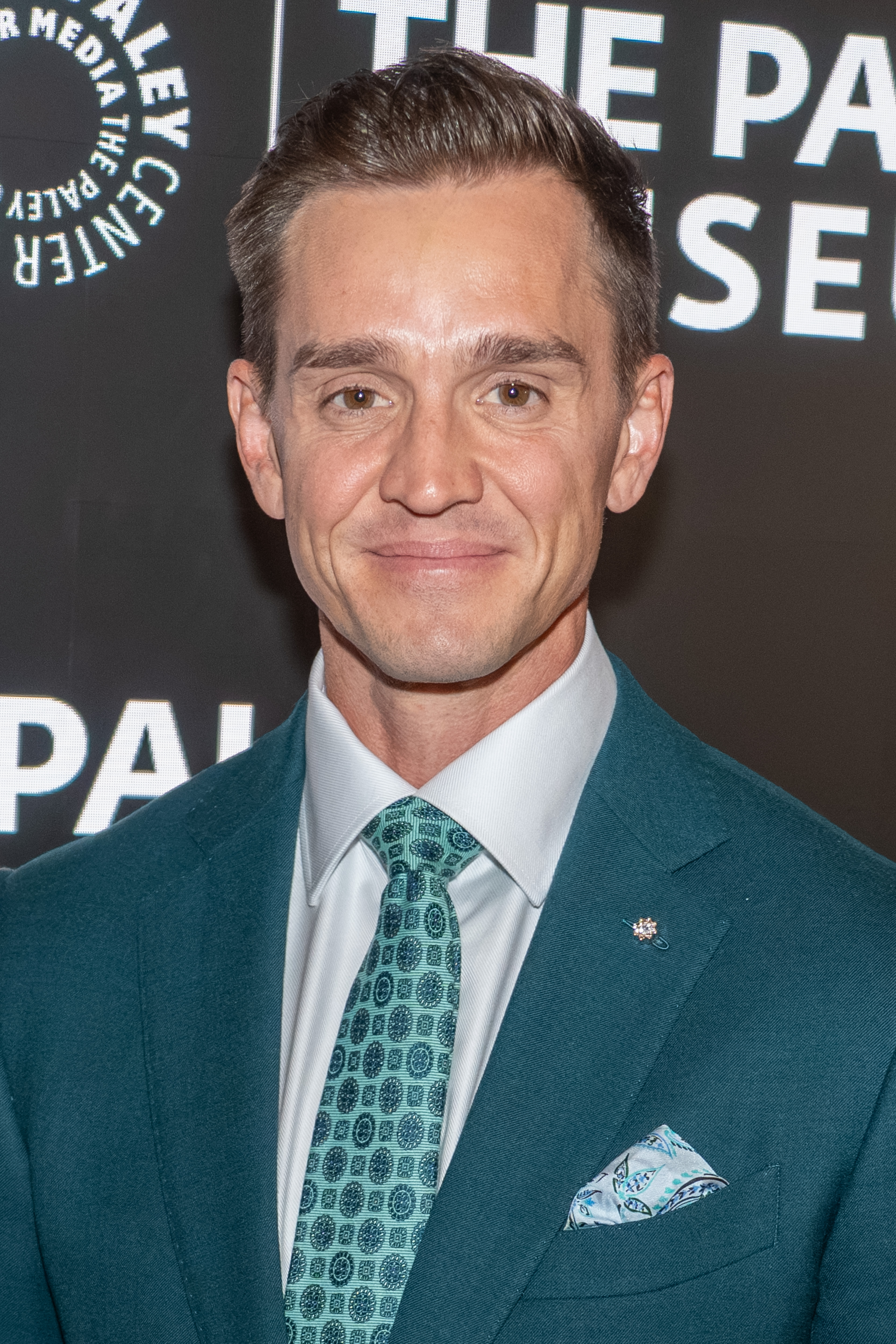
- Holden in 2026

Personal information
- Full name: Stuart Alistair Holden
- Date of birth: August 1, 1985 (age 41)
- Place of birth: Cults, Aberdeen, Scotland
- Height: 5 ft 10 in (1.78 m)
- Position: Midfielder

College career
Years	Team	Apps	(Gls)
2003–2004	Clemson Tigers		

Senior career*
Years	Team	Apps	(Gls)
2005	Sunderland	0	(0)
2006–2009	Houston Dynamo	88	(15)
2010–2014	Bolton Wanderers	30	(2)
2013	→ Sheffield Wednesday (loan)	4	(0)
Total		122	(17)

International career^{‡}
2004–2005	United States U20	11	(2)
2007–2008	United States U23	7	(1)
2008–2013	United States	25	(3)
Medal record
Representing United States
Winner	CONCACAF Gold Cup	2013
Runner-up	CONCACAF Gold Cup	2009
Men's Soccer
- * Club domestic league appearances and goals as of May 19, 2013 ‡ National team caps and goals as of July 28, 2013

Stuart Alistair Holden (born August 1, 1985) is a former professional soccer player who played as a midfielder, and is currently the lead TV game analyst for Fox Sports. Holden is part of the ownership group for Spanish La Liga football club RCD Mallorca.

Born in Scotland, Holden represented the United States at under-20, under-23 and senior levels. He made his senior debut in July 2009 against Grenada and scored his first goal during that game. He was part of the United States squad at the 2008 Summer Olympics, 2009 and 2013 CONCACAF Gold Cup and 2010 FIFA World Cup. Holden gained 25 caps and scored three goals. Following severe and recurring knee problems, Holden announced his retirement from professional soccer on February 3, 2016.

After retiring, Holden made a quick transition into TV, working now as the lead match analyst and host for Fox Sports. He has worked as the lead color commentator on the network's marquee soccer properties including Major League Soccer, U.S. Men's National Team World Cup Qualifiers, and most notably, the 2018 FIFA World Cup in Russia and the 2022 FIFA World Cup in Qatar.

== Early life ==
Holden was born in Cults, Aberdeen and grew up in Sugar Land, Texas after moving there with his family at age 10. His father worked for Chevron Corporation in its human resources department. He played high school soccer in Houston for Awty International School. He graduated from Awty in 2003 and attended April 22, 2008 opening ceremony of the Awty athletic complex.

He played soccer for Clemson University and also played Counter-Strike professionally for Forsaken before his MLS career.

== Playing career ==
=== Sunderland ===
After playing two seasons of college soccer at Clemson University, Holden signed with English club Sunderland in early 2005. On March 12, Holden was attacked outside a bar in Newcastle because he was a Sunderland player, leaving him with a fractured left eye socket, which prevented him from training with the club for two months. When Holden resumed training, he suffered an ankle injury that ruled him out for the rest of the season. Holden was released after his six-month stay having never played for Sunderland's first team.

=== Houston Dynamo ===
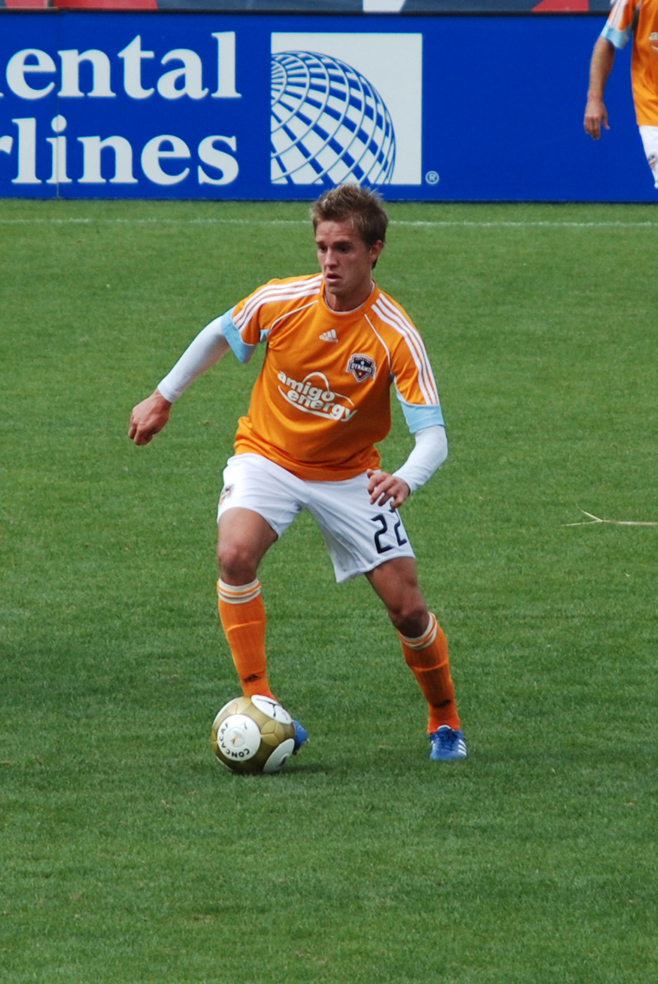
Holden playing for Houston Dynamo in 2009

Holden returned to the United States to play in Major League Soccer with the Houston Dynamo for the 2006 season. He made his MLS debut on May 27, 2006, and scored his first professional goal on July 22, 2006, in a 1–1 home draw against New England. He appeared thirteen times in the 2006 regular season and twice as a substitute in Houston's run to the MLS Cup 2006 championship. In the championship penalty shootout, Holden took the Dynamo's second shot and scored to the top right corner.

Holden's playing time increased in the 2007 season. He mostly started on the left wing when teammate Brad Davis went down with injury. In July, Holden scored goals on consecutive Thursday night games and added three assists in league play and another in SuperLiga play, as of July 25. In Holden's final season with the Houston Dynamo, he finished the season with over 30 games played, 6 goals and 4 assists. He was named to Major League Soccer All-Star team and MLS Best XI and received the U.S. Soccer Humanitarian of the Year award.

=== Bolton Wanderers ===
Having spent several weeks training in England following the end of the 2009 Major League Soccer season, Holden officially joined Premier League side Bolton Wanderers on January 25, 2010. He made his debut on February 24, 2010, in a 4–0 defeat against Tottenham Hotspur in the FA Cup, starting and playing the full ninety minutes. He made his first league appearance on February 27, 2010, playing the full 90 minutes in a 1–0 victory over Wolverhampton Wanderers. On September 30, 2010, he signed a new contract at Bolton, which would keep him at the club until 2013. He scored his first goal for Bolton away to Wolverhampton Wanderers on November 13, 2010.

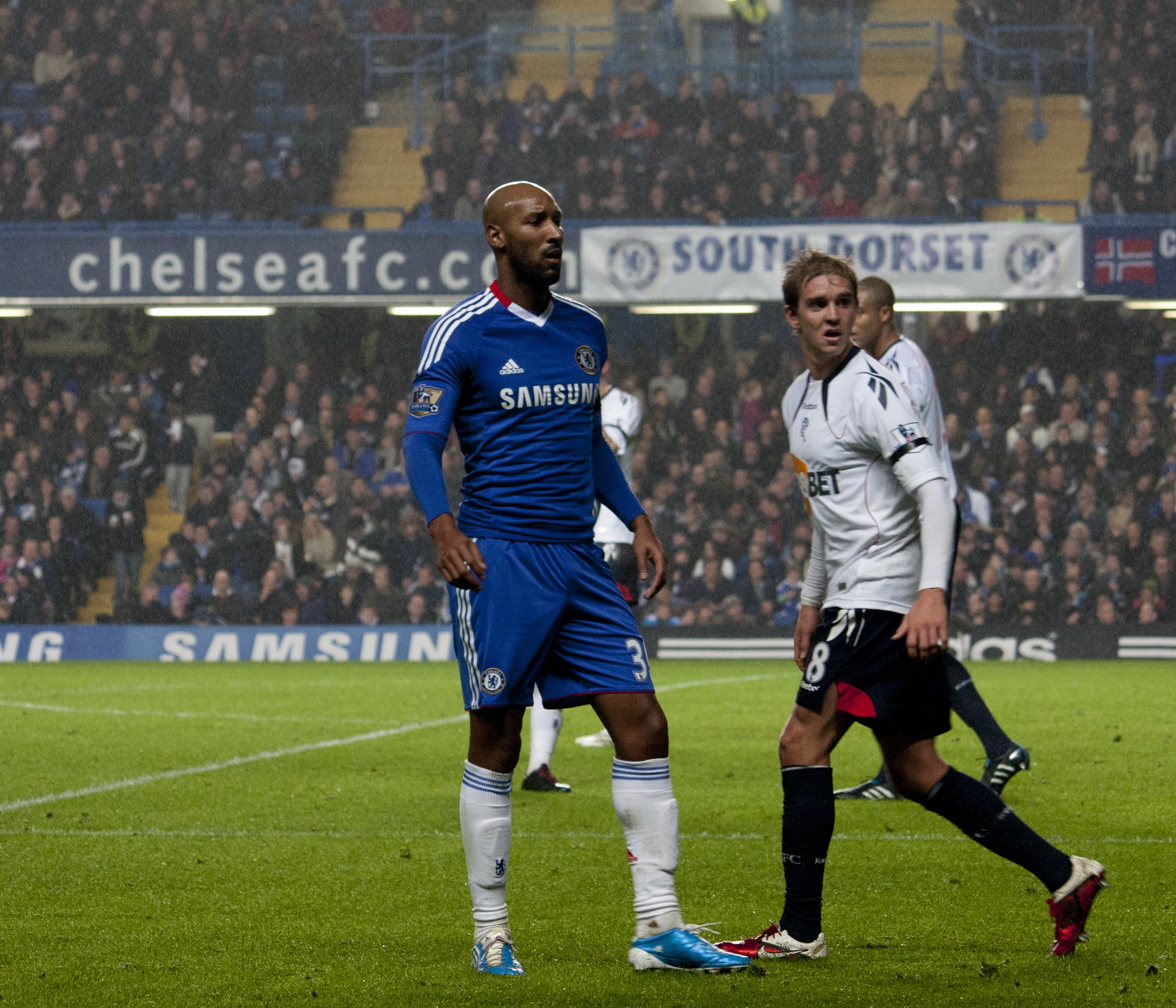
Holden and Nicolas Anelka during a match in the Premier League

In the 2010–11 season, Holden helped Bolton reach seventh place in the Premier League and to the FA Cup Semi-finals. However, his season was cut short on March 19 after he suffered a severe knee injury against Manchester United at Old Trafford when going into a tackle with Jonny Evans. Evans' studs caught Holden in the left knee, leaving a gash that required twenty six stitches and a fracture of the femur near the knee joint, which ruled him out for a minimum of six months. Despite missing the final two months of the season, Holden was still voted the 2011 Bolton Wanderers Player of the Year. Without Holden, Bolton tailspun and finished the season in fourteenth position.

On September 20, 2011, after six months out, Holden started and played the full ninety minutes against Aston Villa in the third round of the League Cup, but was then initially ruled out for a further six weeks as the club brought forward a routine follow up procedure. However, the procedure revealed cartilage damage, meaning Holden would be out for a further six months, missing the rest of the season. Later on in the season, Bolton Wanderers were relegated to the Championship after 11 years in the Premier League.

On June 22, 2012, Holden announced via his Twitter account that he was due to switch to the number 22 shirt after it had been vacated by Jussi Jääskeläinen. This was confirmed by the club when they released their squad numbers on July 5.

After playing in a reserve match in early January 2013, Holden made his return to Bolton's first team on January 15, 16 months after his last appearance, coming on as a late substitute in their 2–0 FA Cup replay win against his former club Sunderland.

Holden joined fellow Championship team Sheffield Wednesday on a month's loan on March 28, 2013, mainly for match fitness after a series of injuries, and also to replace Wednesday's injured right midfielder Michail Antonio. He made his debut two days later in the local derby at home to Barnsley. Holden played four times for Wednesday during his loan spell.

His return to action saw Holden receive another call-up to the US Men's National team for World Cup Qualifying and the Gold Cup. However, after making 8 more appearances, it was confirmed that Holden had torn his anterior cruciate ligament in his right leg while playing for the United States in the CONCACAF Gold Cup final against Panama on June 29, 2013. In devastating news for Bolton Wanderers fans, it meant Holden would miss the majority of the 2013–14 season.

After another comeback attempt, Holden returned to action in March 2014 in a reserve match vs Everton. In his first match back, his return from injury only lasted 23 minutes. It was later announced that Holden had re-injured the right knee and torn his anterior cruciate ligament for a 2nd time. It required another surgery which would set him back for another six to nine months.

Holden was promised a new contract for the 2014–15 season in February 2014. Instead however, whilst he returned to the club for the 2014–15, it was on non-contract terms. Bolton did officially register him as a player for the reserves, though.

== International career ==
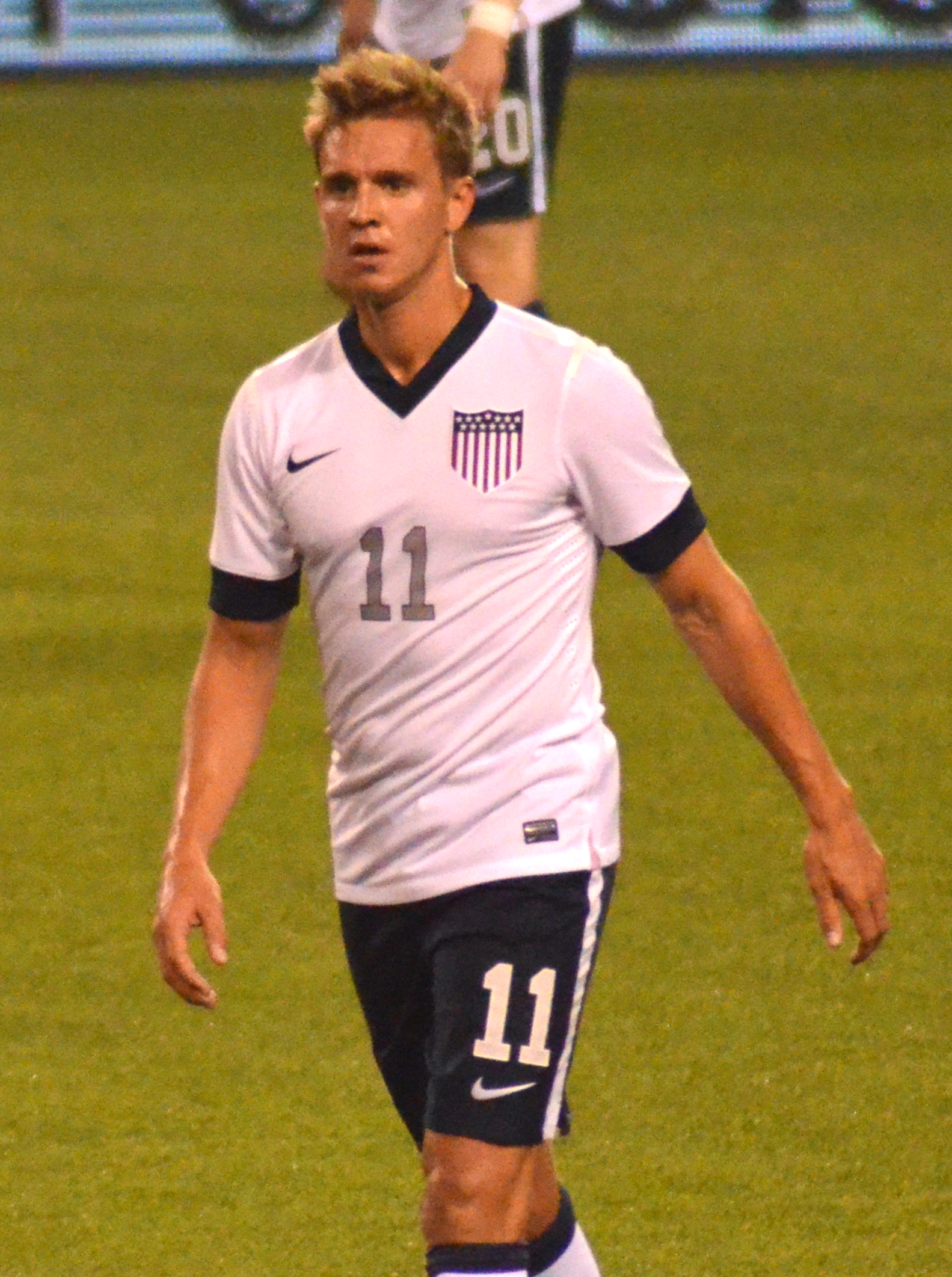
Holden playing for the United States against Belgium in May 2013

Holden was capped 11 times as a United States youth international at the U-20 level, scoring two goals, the first being on July 18, 2004, in a 2–2 home draw against Denmark U-20 in the 2004 Milk Cup in Northern Ireland. and the other on June 24, 2004, in a 1–2 defeat against Brazil U-20 in the Busan Four Nations International Youth Tournament. Early in 2007, Holden was called in to the U.S. U-23 squad for a camp in California and in December for a camp and trip to China to play matches against the China U-23 team. In July 2008, Holden was named to the U.S. squad competing in the 2008 Beijing Olympics. On August 7, he scored in the U.S.'s opening match, a 1–0 victory against Japan. In December 2008 Holden was called into a camp set to begin in January 2009 preceding a friendly against Sweden on January 24. He sustained a hip injury prior to the friendly and was forced to withdraw from camp.

Gold Cup

Holden was named to the United States Gold Cup squad on June 25, 2009, as nearly all of the senior regulars were rested following the Confederations Cup. Holden scored a goal for the U.S. in his national team debut against Grenada on July 4, 2009. On July 11, 2009, Holden scored his second international goal against Haiti with a thirty-yard strike that tied the game in the ninety-second minute, and assisted the U.S.'s first goal in that match, which was scored by Davy Arnaud. Holden added two more assists in the 2–0 semi-final win against Honduras. Stuart was selected to the Gold Cup All-Tournament Team.

World Cup

During a friendly match on March 3, 2010, Nigel de Jong broke Holden's leg, causing him to miss six weeks of soccer just months before the FIFA World Cup. After an intensive rehab, Holden proved his fitness by making it back on the field for Bolton Wanderer's final home match of the season. On May 26, 2010, it was announced that Holden would be part of the 23-man roster for the U.S. National Team which played in the 2010 World Cup in South Africa and he played as a substitute in the opening 1–1 draw with England. He was part of the United States team that won their group ahead of England, Algeria and Slovenia.

After two and a half years without a national team appearance due to injuries, Holden was called up by Jurgen Klinsmann. In May 2013, he made his return, coming on as a substitute during the United States' important match vs Panama in 2014 World Cup Qualifying. Later that summer, he was named to the 2013 CONCACAF Gold Cup squad that eventually went on to win the tournament. He appeared in 5 Gold Cup matches and scored in the opening match vs Belize. In the final vs Panama, Holden started the match, but was forced off through injury in the 23rd minute. It was later announced that he had torn his anterior cruciate ligament in the right knee and would require surgery, effectively ending his career with the national team.

== Broadcasting career ==
Upon retiring from professional soccer, Holden pursued a career in TV and has become one of the top voices of soccer in North America. He worked as an analyst for ESPN and NBC in 2014, before signing exclusively with Fox Sports 1 in 2016. Holden has also done work as a host, where he had a series with Steve Nash called 'Speak Responsibly'.

Fox Sports

Holden first started working with Fox Sports in 2014, working on all of their marquee soccer properties (UEFA Champions League, MLS, FIFA, FA Cup, Europa League). He made a sharp rise in the TV business and within two years has established himself as Fox's lead color commentator across multiple soccer properties. On April 25, 2018, Fox announced that he will be their lead color commentator for the 2018 FIFA World Cup in Russia. He partnered in the booth with John Strong, and the pair traveled throughout Russia calling the tournament's biggest games, including the 2018 World Cup Final on July 15, 2018, featuring Croatia and France. The duo continue to call games as Fox's #1 broadcast team for MLS, USMNT, and 2022 FIFA World Cup matches.

The duo went on to call the 2022 FIFA World Cup in Qatar, where they were assigned the tournament’s marquee matches throughout the group stage and knockout rounds, culminating in the 2022 World Cup Final on December 18, 2022 — one of the most watched matches in American television history — as Argentina defeated France on penalties. Strong and Holden have now called two consecutive World Cup Finals together and are widely regarded as the top soccer broadcast duo in the United States. Together they have called over 450 matches, and are set to call their third World Cup Final at the 2026 FIFA World Cup, to be held across the United States, Canada, and Mexico.

It was recently announced by FOX Sports, that Stu Holden and John Strong will serve as the lead announce team on their FIFA World Cup 2026 Coverage, calling all the USA matches and the Final on July 19, in New York.

B/R Football and Turner Sports

Ahead of the 2018–2019 season of the UEFA Champions League Holden was signed by Turner Sports and B/R Football to be one of their lead studio analysts alongside Tim Howard, Kate Abdo and Steve Nash. Turner opted out of their three-year broadcast deal early in 2020.

== Club ownership ==
On January 4, 2016, it was announced that an American Group of investors, led by Robert Sarver, purchased a controlling stake in RCD Mallorca for $21 million. The ownership group included basketball icon, Steve Nash, and Stuart Holden. Holden and Nash's journey as owners of the club has been well documented in their video podcast 2 Dads United, in which they discuss their roles and influence on the club. In 2018, RCD Mallorca were promoted to the 2nd division in Spain. In 2019, RCD Mallorca were promoted to Spain's top division, La Liga. Holden and Nash are heavily involved on the soccer side and frequently visit their club on the island of Mallorca.

== Style of play ==
Holden was a versatile, linking midfielder who, due to his ambidexterity, could play in the left, right, or center of the midfield. Holden was particularly noted for his adeptness at taking set pieces and delivering crosses, being compared to David Beckham.

== Personal life ==
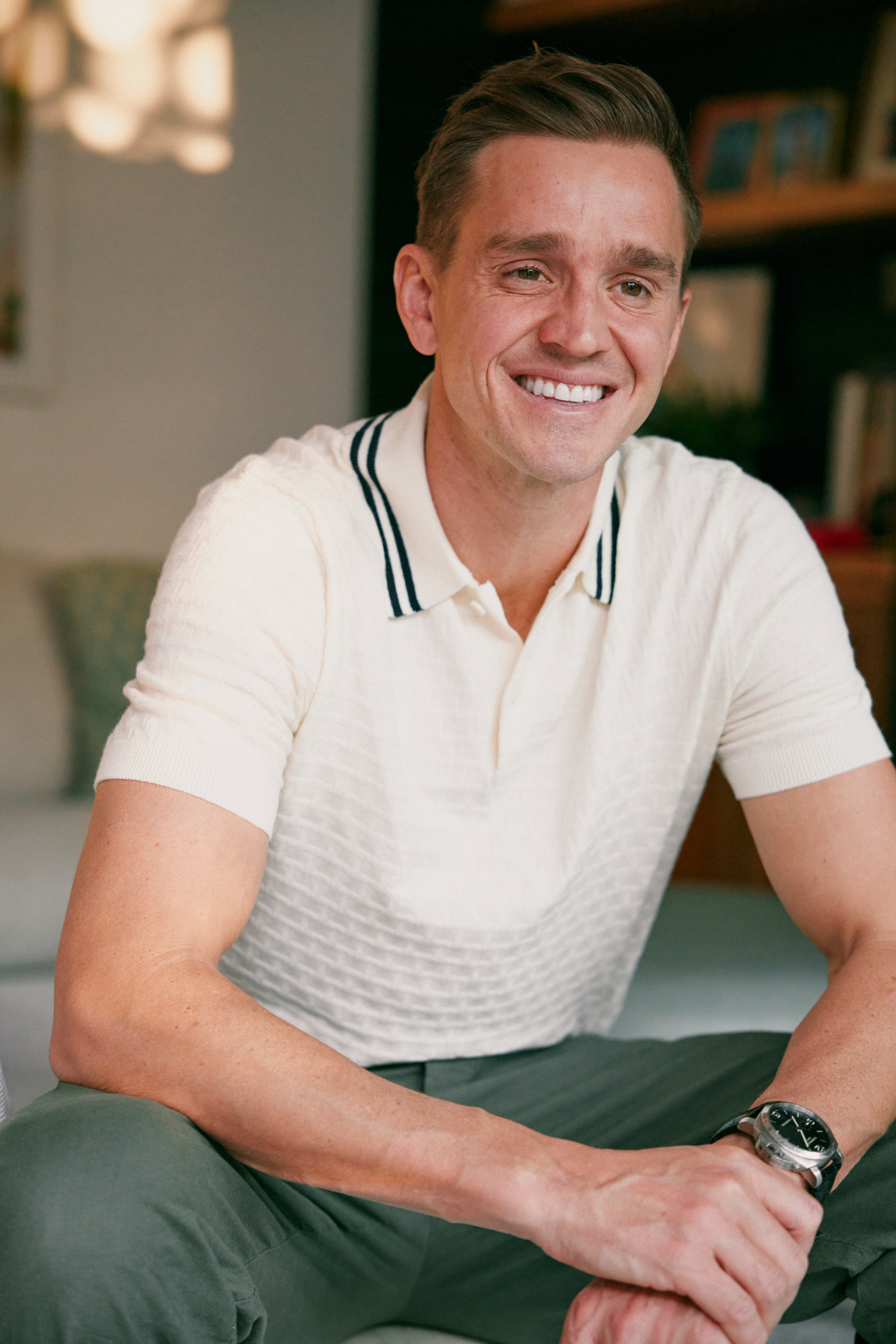
Holden in 2023

Holden was born in Scotland and moved to the United States at the age of ten. His father lost a six-year battle with cancer in early 2009. His mother still lives in Houston. He has been an American citizen since 2006. Every game, Holden wears a Livestrong bracelet that belonged to his father, taping over it for its protection.

Holden's brother, Euan Holden, was also a professional soccer player who last played for League Two club Bury. Euan was a viral sensation in 2018 when he became "#PlaneBae" – he had a blossoming romance that was filmed by a couple of passengers on a plane. Holden said he was "upstaged" by his brother while he was covering the biggest tournament of his broadcasting career.

Having lived in and spent the majority of his childhood growing up in Scotland, Holden spoke with a Scottish accent up until the age of around 10, when, having emigrated to the U.S. with his family, he developed a pronounced Houstonian accent with which he still speaks to this day, despite having returned to live and work in the UK. He became engaged to model Karalyn West in March 2014 and the two got married in June 2015. Their son was born in February 2016.

It was announced in November 2022 that Holden was joining Lotto / WHP Global as a brand ambassador.

== Career statistics ==
=== Club ===
As of July 10, 2013.

Club	Season	League			National Cup		League Cup		Other		Total	
Club	Season	Division	Apps	Goals	Apps	Goals	Apps	Goals	Apps	Goals	Apps	Goals
England			League		FA Cup		League Cup		Europe		Total	
Sunderland	2005–06	Premier League	0	0	0	0	0	0	—		0	0
United States			League		US Open Cup		MLS Cup Playoffs		North America		Total	
Houston Dynamo	2006	MLS	13	1	3	0	2	0	—		18	1
Houston Dynamo	2007	MLS	22	5	1	0	4	1	4 (Note: One appearance in CONCACAF Champions League, three appearances in North American SuperLiga)	0	31	6
Houston Dynamo	2008	MLS	27	3	1	0	2	0	7 (Note: Five appearances and one goal in CONCACAF Champions League, two appearances and three goals in North American SuperLiga)	4	37	7
Houston Dynamo	2009	MLS	26	6	0	0	3	0	7 (Note: Appearances in CONCACAF Champions League)	2	36	8
Houston Dynamo	Dynamo Total		88	15	5	0	11	1	18	6	122	22
England			League		FA Cup		League Cup		Europe		Total	
Bolton Wanderers	2009–10	Premier League	2	0	1	0	0	0	—		3	0
Bolton Wanderers	2010–11	Premier League	26	2	3	0	1	0	—		30	2
Bolton Wanderers	2011–12	Premier League	0	0	0	0	1	0	—		1	0
Bolton Wanderers	2012–13	Championship	2	0	2	0	0	0	—		4	0
Bolton Wanderers	2013–14	Championship	0	0	0	0	0	0	—		0	0
Bolton Wanderers	Bolton Total		30	2	6	0	2	0	0	0	38	2
Sheffield Wednesday (loan)	2012–13	Championship	4	0	0	0	0	0	—		4	0
Career Totals			122	17	11	0	13	1	18	6	164	24

=== International ===
As of December 15, 2014.

National team	Year	Apps	Goals
United States
United States	2009	11	2
United States	2010	6	0
United States	2011	0	0
United States	2012	0	0
United States	2013	8	1
Total		25	3

== Honors ==
=== Club ===
Houston Dynamo

- MLS Cup
  - Winners: 2006, 2007
- Supporters' Shield
  - Runners-up: 2008
- Western Conference
  - Winners (Playoff): 2006, 2007
  - Winners (Regular Season): 2008

=== International ===
- CONCACAF Gold Cup
  - Winners: 2013
  - Runners-up: 2009
  - All-Tournament Team: 2009

=== Individual ===
- MLS Best XI: 2009

== See also ==
- List of United States men's international soccer players born outside the United States
