= Kate Scott (British presenter) =

English sports broadcaster (born 1981)

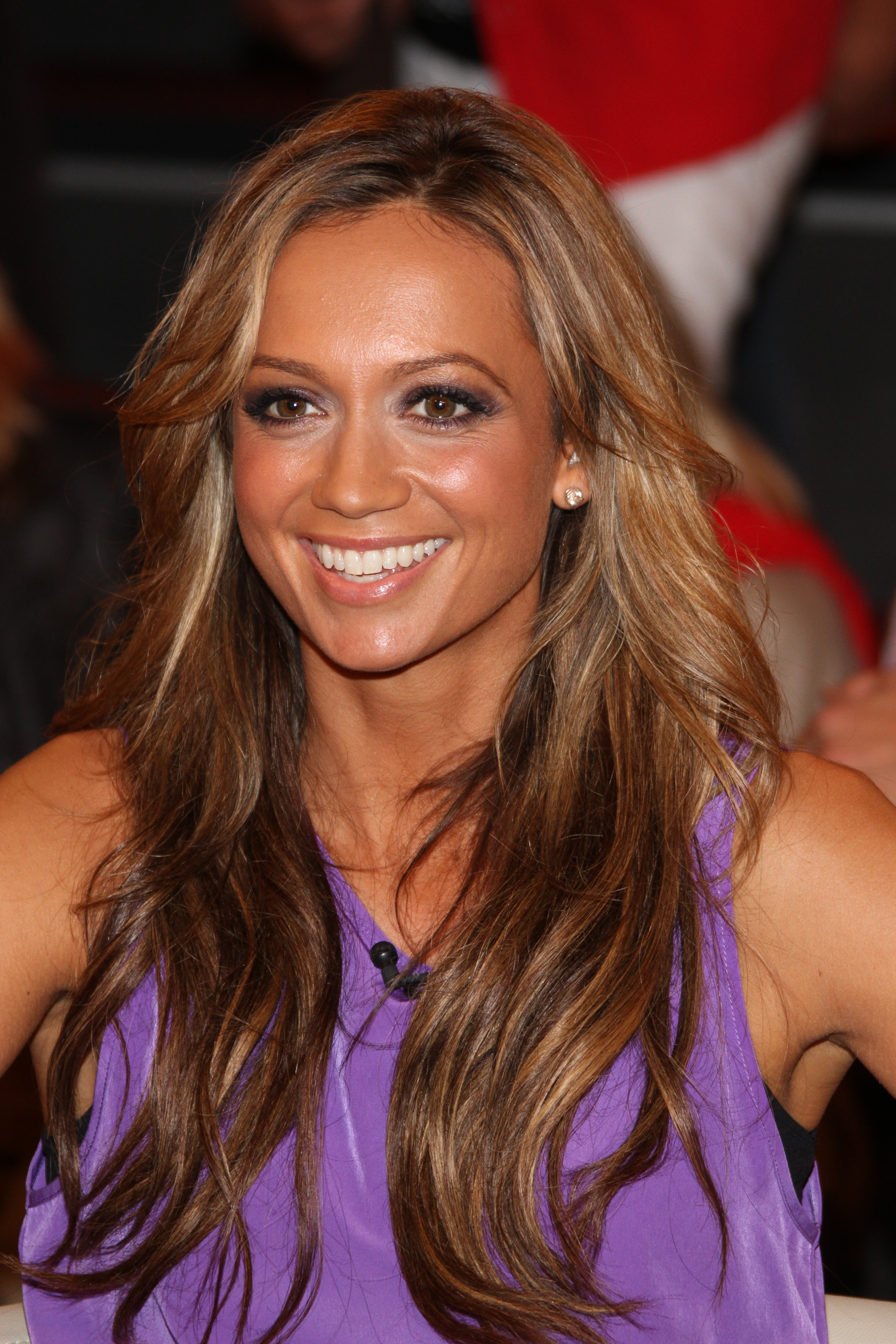
- Scott c. 2012
- Born: Kate Giles; 8 September 1981 (age 45); Manchester, England
- Other name: Kate Abdo
- Occupation: Sports broadcaster
- Years active: 2005–present
- Employer: CBS Sports
- Spouse(s): Ramtin Abdolmajid (m. 2010; div. 2016) Malik Scott (m. 2024)

Kate Scott (née Giles, formerly Abdo; born 8 September 1981) is an English sports broadcaster who works primarily for CBS Sports. She is noted for her coverage of association football, and has anchored CBS's coverage of the UEFA Champions League since August 2020. Throughout her career, she has worked internationally in the United Kingdom, Spain, France, Germany, and the United States.

== Early life ==
Born in Manchester, Scott studied at Christ the King School, Manchester, and Withington Girls' School. She moved to Spain at the age of 17, learned Spanish, and took her high school diploma. She earned a degree in European languages from the University of Salford, in addition to studying translation and interpreting at the University of Málaga. Scott also took time out of her studies to live in France and Germany.

== Career ==
Scott’s broadcasting career started at the German international news network Deutsche Welle in 2005, in which she completed an internship in the foreign language department. In 2006–07, she worked as a production assistant for Goal! The Bundesliga Magazine, and at the same time was sports news presenter at Deutsche Welle until 2009, where she hosted sports coverage for their English- and German-language services.

From there, she moved to CNN, where she anchored the World Sports programme daily. She also hosted a feature show at CNN. Scott left CNN to join Sky Sport News HD in Germany where she was head anchor and the face of the network. Scott joined to be a public face for the launch of the network and was also heavily involved in the development of the network's coverage, formats and programming.

From Germany, Scott moved to the UK to join Sky Sports, where she hosted the Pay Per View Boxing events, European Football, Transfer Deadline day and Sky Sports News. Sky Sports loaned Scott to Fox Sports to host their coverage of the Women's World Cup in 2015, and Scott later took up a permanent offer from the network to relocate to the US and host their Champions League, Europa League, World Cup, FA Cup, and Bundesliga coverage. On three occasions (2010, 2011 and 2013), she acted as presenter for the UEFA Europa League group stage draw in Monaco.

At Fox, Scott took on the role of hosting Fox's Premier Boxing Champions, including a regular studio show "Inside PBC Boxing" and fight night coverage. After Fox lost the rights to Champions League to Turner, Scott also signed a deal to host Champions League coverage on TNT from Turner's Atlanta studios.

Scott is also well known for her role hosting the FIFA Ballon d'Or and Laureus World Sports Awards, both of which she hosted on numerous occasions. At the 2014 FIFA Ballon d'Or ceremony she spoke with contestants and guests in four languages. She was also a host for the 2015 FIFA Ballon d'Or.

After losing major football rights and the cancellation of ‘’Inside PBC’’, Scott left Fox Sports. In 2022, she briefly returned to Fox to host their nightly 2022 FIFA World Cup show in Qatar.

In August 2020, after CBS Sports took over UEFA Champions League broadcasting rights in the United States, Scott became the broadcaster's first hire to present UEFA Champions League Today. The show, anchored by Scott and featuring Thierry Henry, Jamie Carragher, and Micah Richards, achieved widespread critical acclaim. In June 2023, it was announced that she had signed a new, four-year exclusive contract with CBS Sports.

== Personal life ==
Both Scott and her father, Tom Giles, are Manchester United fans. Tom was a special guest when he was interviewed by Peter Schmeichel live at Etihad Stadium in 2023.

Scott was married to German-Iranian businessman Ramtin Abdo, full name Ramtin Abdolmajid, from 2010 to 2016. In December 2023, it was revealed that she was in a relationship with American former boxer Malik Scott, whom she had previously been pictured training with in September 2023. In March 2024, the pair went public with their relationship on Instagram. They married in September 2024.
