= Danielle Slaton =

American soccer player

- Slaton in 2026

Personal information
- Full name: Danielle Victoria Slaton
- Date of birth: June 10, 1980 (age 46)
- Place of birth: San Jose, California, U.S.
- Height: 5 ft 6 in (1.68 m)
- Position: Defender

Youth career
- Central Valley Mercury

College career
| Years | Team | Apps | (Gls) |
| 1998–2001 | Santa Clara Broncos | | |

Senior career*
| Years | Team | Apps | (Gls) |
| 2002–2003 | Carolina Courage | | |
| 2005 | Lyon | | |

International career
| 1999–2003 | United States | 43 | (1) |
Medal record
Women's soccer
Representing United States
Olympic Games
| Silver medal – second place | 2000 Sydney | Team competition |
- * Club domestic league appearances and goals

Danielle Victoria Slaton (born June 10, 1980) is an American retired professional soccer player. She is currently a soccer analyst for MLS Season Pass, Fox Sports and the Pac-12 Network. A five-year member of the United States women's national soccer team from 2000-2005, Slaton also played for the Carolina Courage in the Women's United Soccer Association (WUSA) and was named the league's Defender of the Year. She went on to play for the French club Olympique Lyonnais where she was a starting defender on the team in the Division 1 Féminine. In 2017 she was inducted into the San Jose Sports Hall of Fame.

== Early life ==
Slaton was born in San Jose, California. She attended Presentation High School in San Jose, California and led the soccer team to three Central Coast Section Championship games. She was named first team All-Santa Teresa Athletic League and first team All-CCS all four years. She was honored as the San Jose Mercury News Freshman and Sophomore of the Year following the 1995 and 1996 seasons. She was awarded a scholarship from the 100 Black Men of Silicon Valley and graduated with a 4.0 grade point average.

Slaton played club soccer for the Central Valley Mercury coached by Vicky Wagner and Phillippe Blin, former Santa Clara assistant and former head coach at San Jose State. She helped lead the Mercury to three consecutive national championships in 1996, 1997 and 1998.

=== Santa Clara University ===
Slaton played for Santa Clara University, where she was a four-year starter, three-time first-team All-America defender and team captain for the Santa Clara Broncos from 1998-2001.

During her senior year, she helped lead the Broncos to the 2001 NCAA Championship and was named the NCAA College Cup Defensive MVP. She was a four-time first team all-West Coast Conference selection, the 1998 WCC Freshman of the Year and 2001 Defender of the Year. Slaton graduated Santa Clara University having started 79-of-84 games, scoring 50 points on eight goals and 34 assists.

She was named the 2001 National Soccer Coaches Association of American (NSCAA) Scholar Athlete of the Year and graduated magna cum laude with a 3.74 GPA.

== Playing career ==
=== Club career ===
In 2002, Slaton was the first overall draft pick by the Carolina Courage in the Women's United Soccer Association (WUSA). She helped lead the team to the WUSA Championship and was named the league's Defender of the Year.

In 2005, Slaton played for Olympique Lyonnais in France where she was a starting defender on the French First Division team and a member of the runner-up French Cup Tournament team.

=== International ===
Slaton was member of the under-21 national team pool in 1999. She captained the under-16 team from 1996-1997.

Slaton was a five-year member of the U.S. National Team from 2000-05 that won a silver medal at the 2000 Olympic Games in Sydney, Australia and a member of the third place 2003 World Cup squad. Her first appearance with the United States women's national soccer team occurred on February 24, 1999, against Finland. She scored her first goal on January 13, 2000, against Australia. She was the youngest member of the 2000 Olympic Team and the only member with college eligibility remaining.

== Coaching career ==
In 2005, Slaton served as an assistant coach at Evergreen Valley High School in San Jose, California where she helped lead the team to its first county tournament win in school history. She spent six months as assistant and head coach for the Capital Area Soccer in Raleigh, North Carolina. In 2006, Slaton joined the coaching staff of Northwestern University as assistant coach.

== Broadcasting career ==
In 2010, Slaton joined the Big Ten Network as a soccer analyst. In 2014, Slaton was named a sports analyst for Fox Soccer for the 2014 CONCACAF Women's Championship. She also served as analyst for Fox during the 2015 Algarve Cup. In February 2015, Slaton joined the broadcasting team for "Chicago Fire Weekly" on ESPN Chicago and was the sideline analyst for the Fire on Comcast SportsNet Chicago.

In March 2016, Slaton became an analyst for San Jose Earthquakes home broadcasts on San Francisco-based regional sports networks Comcast SportsNet California and Comcast SportsNet Bay Area (since renamed NBC Sports California and NBC Sports Bay Area). Slaton was also a soccer analyst for the Pac-12 Network.

Slaton served as a match analyst for Fox Sports for the 2019 FIFA Women's World Cup in France. She was a commentator for MLS Season Pass on Apple TV in 2023.

== Other work ==
In 2010, she traveled to Paraguay as a SportsUnited Sports Envoy hosted by the United States Embassy. Slaton conducted seven clinics in three days, coaching as many as 300 girls ranging from 9 to 16 years old, as well as the Paraguay Women's National Team.

Slaton has been a member of the Athlete Council for U.S. Soccer. In 2012, after Pia Sundhage's departure as head coach of the United States women's national soccer team, Slaton joined Mia Hamm and Sunil Gulati as a member of the search committee for Sundhage's successor.

Slaton currently serves on the National Advisory Board for the Positive Coaching Alliance (PCA), and conducts live PCA workshops in the Bay Area for coaches, parents, and athletes of youth and high school sports programs. Slaton is also a member of the Board of Directors of the Bay Area Women's Sports Initiative (BAWSI).

== Personal life ==
Slaton lives in the Bay Area.
