= Francisco X. Rivera =

Sportscaster

- Born: Francisco Xavier Rivera; Mexico City, Mexico
- Sports commentary career
- Genre: Play-by-play
- Sports: Soccer; Major League Baseball; National Basketball Association; Mixed Martial Arts

Francisco X. Rivera is a bilingual sportscaster who specializes in soccer, football and baseball. He started his on-air career in 2005 as a host, play-by-play announcer and reporter, as one of the youngest on-air talents in American television. He made his debut on English-language network television as a sideline reporter for Fox Sports during the 2013 CONCACAF Gold Cup. The Long Beach State graduate can be seen and heard on FS1, Estrella TV and ESPN Deportes Radio, among other outlets in the United States and Latin America.

== Biography ==
Francisco X. Rivera is a soccer commentator and reporter for Fox Sports. He joined the network's soccer coverage as a sideline reporter in the 2013 Gold Cup, and has served as a contributor for high-profile Mexico national team matches including the 2017 FIFA Confederations Cup and the CONCACAF Gold Cup. He has also called international and college soccer matches on FS1, Fox Sports West and Prime Ticket. In June 2013, he became the first Mexican-born broadcaster on the FOX broadcast Network.

Rivera is in his 13th year with FOX Deportes, mainly as play-by-play announcer and reporter for Major League Baseball games across the United States. On October 24, 2012, Rivera became the youngest broadcaster to call a World Series game on Spanish television in the United States. He has also served as a host and analyst of their NFL coverage, including Super Bowl XLVIII. He has also College Football and UFC events on the network.

On October 30, 2018, Francisco was announced as the new Spanish voice of the Los Angeles Kings on KWKW 1330AM ESPN Deportes Radio. The station will broadcast 10 Kings game during the 2018–19 season, starting on November 1. He also serves as KWKW's pre, half and postgame host on its Los Angeles Rams gameday coverage.

Francisco also made history as the first Spanish radio analyst of the MLS expansion franchise Los Angeles Football Club during its inaugural 2018 season. He has also served as a guest analyst and sideline reporter on the club's YouTube TV programming.

Rivera joined the Time Warner Cable Deportes broadcast team in 2013 as the studio host of Los Angeles Sparks game coverage, as well as other shows within the network. Rivera made his debut as the Los Angeles Clippers' Spanish TV analyst during the 2011–2012 NBA season on games broadcast on Time Warner Cable. He performed the same role for the Los Angeles Lakers during the 2010–2011 season.

A veteran of mixed martial arts Spanish broadcasts, Rivera currently works for King of the Cage as the host of Guerreros Hispanos, a weekly show on Azteca America. He had previously spent three years as the Spanish host and play-by-play announcer of the Zuffa-owned company World Extreme Cagefighting, calling all WEC live events in the United States on Versus, as well as in Mexico on Cadena Tres.

Rivera is also a play-by-play announcer and on-air talent for DirecTV Latin America, broadcasting international matches including Spain's La Liga and the UEFA Champions League, as well as MLB and NBA.

During 2007 and 2008, Rivera was the host of Los Angeles en Accion, the weekly Spanish TV show of the Los Angeles Angels of Anaheim on KWHY-TV (channel 22). He also worked for the Los Angeles station as the host of El Show de Los Lakers during the 2007–08 NBA season. Starting in 2009, he called the action for the L.A. Angels of Anaheim on select games broadcast on ESPN Deportes Radio.

Adding to his soccer experience, Rivera became the Spanish voice of the two-time Major League Soccer Champion Los Angeles Galaxy in its historical 2007 season featuring David Beckham.

In 2006, he hosted "Vamos Dodgers", the team's Spanish-language TV show on KJLA-57. During his tenure with Fox and the Dodgers in 2006, Rivera was one of the youngest sports broadcasters in the United States.

== Achievements ==
Francisco's resume also includes calling MLB's All-Star Game, playoffs, and World Series, as well as international soccer tournaments such as the UEFA Champions League, FIFA Club World Cup, Copa Libertadores, the Super Bowl and the NBA Finals.

He was recognized as "Sports Knight" by The Hollywood Reporter in their September 2012 feature "Young Latinos in Entertainment: On-Air Talent to Watch".

Rivera has a Bachelor's Degree in Broadcast Journalism from Long Beach State University.

== Personal life ==
Francisco is the cousin of former actress and former First Lady of Mexico, Angelica Rivera de Pena.
