= Mike Watts (sportscaster) =

American sportscaster (born 1993)

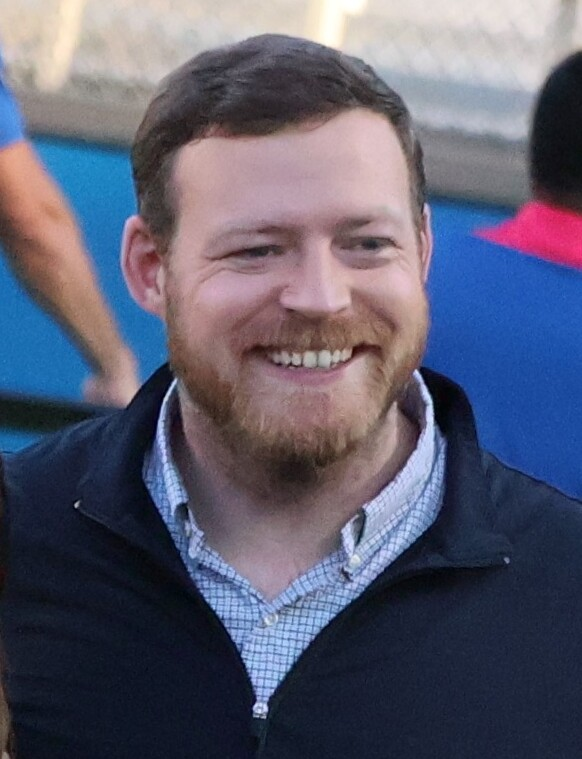
- Watts in 2026
- Born: Michael Watts; 1993 (age 32–33); Cleveland, Ohio, U.S.
- Education: Fordham University (BS)
- Occupation: Sports commentator
- Years active: 2014–present
- Website: www.mikewattsonair.com

Michael Watts (born 1993) is an American television sports commentator. He has commentated on soccer games including for the National Women's Soccer League (NWSL), USL Championship, and CONCACAF Champions League, and worked in other sports.

== Early life and education ==
Watts grew up in the Cleveland suburb of Shaker Heights, Ohio. He played football in his youth before sustaining a back injury during his sophomore year at Saint Ignatius High School. He then began commentating soccer, ice hockey, and other sports for the school's digital Saint Ignatius Broadcasting Network, a new student club that he eventually led. He also helped run the school's Student Sports Information Department, writing a media guide about the football team. He graduated from Saint Ignatius in 2011 and received his degree in finance from Fordham University in New York City in 2014. During college, he was a sports reporter, anchor, and manager for the NPR affiliate WFUV, covering college and professional sports in the New York area.

== Broadcasting career ==
Watts has worked as a freelance sports commentator for a range of sports leagues and networks. In 2014, he first commentated professionally for Sky Blue FC of the National Women's Soccer League (NWSL) and was the league's youngest commentator. He became "the voice of USL Championship" as a play-by-play announcer on ESPN after first commentating for the league at the 2015 USL Cup final. He began commentating weekly during the 2016 USL season. Working with broadcast partner VISTA Worldlink led to him also commentating for the CONCACAF Champions League. He has hosted a SiriusXM radio show about the USL, USL All-Access, with analyst Devon Kerr since April 2021 and formerly hosted the radio show USL Coast to Coast. Since 2024, he has worked alongside Lori Lindsey on the Amazon Prime Video broadcast Friday night in the NWSL.

Outside of soccer, Watts has been a preseason commentator for the National Football League's Cincinnati Bengals, alongside color commentator Anthony Muñoz on the local WKRC-TV broadcast, since 2018. He has also commentated college football for the radio network Westwood One and been a public address announcer for sports events at Madison Square Garden in New York City.

During a U.S. Open Cup game in April 2024, Watts and Kerr wove 235 song titles by Taylor Swift into their broadcast, and later that month he worked fifteen song titles from Swift's The Tortured Poets Department into an NWSL broadcast the day the album was released.
