= Kyndra de St. Aubin =

American sports broadcaster

- Born: Kyndra Hesse
- Occupation: Sports commentator
Association football career
- Positions: Midfielder; defender
College career
Years	Team	Apps	(Gls)
1999	Wisconsin Badgers		
2000–2002	Minnesota Golden Gophers		

Kyndra de St. Aubin (née Hesse) is an American sports broadcaster who is the color commentary announcer for broadcasts of Major League Soccer on Apple TV. Previously she worked as a color commentator for Minnesota United, where she was the first woman to be a full-time lead analyst for a Major League Soccer team.

== Soccer career ==
Kyndra de St. Aubin began her soccer career playing locally for youth teams in the Twin Cities area. In her sophomore year of high school, De St. Aubin's dreams of playing collegiate soccer were threatened by a diagnosis of Lupus. The disease forced her to quit basketball, but she remained passionate and determined to continue with soccer. After graduating from high school, De St. Aubin went on to play collegiate soccer at the University of Wisconsin–Madison for her freshman year before transferring to the University of Minnesota where she lettered twice in her remaining college years. She graduated in 2003 with a major in broadcast journalism.

== Broadcasting career ==
After graduating from college, de St. Aubin took a job working for ESPN 1500AM in Wisconsin. In this job she covered local sports teams including the Milwaukee Bucks, the Milwaukee Brewers, and the Green Bay Packers along with college sports. In 2007, de St. Aubin left Wisconsin to work in Arizona for Arizona Sports 98.7 FM. Here she covered the Arizona Diamondbacks, the Phoenix Suns, the Arizona Cardinals, as well as the Phoenix Coyotes. In Arizona she also had the chance to cover local college teams including Grand Canyon University's teams on Cox Sports. She also worked as an analyst and sideline reporter for the Big Ten Network and Pac-12 Network.

In 2015, de St. Aubin was chosen to be part of one of the five teams that covered the 2015 FIFA Women's World Cup in Canada for Fox Sports. Jenn Hildreth joined de St. Aubin as her broadcast partner and the pair commentated 12 games during the World Cup, including the semi-final match between Japan and England in Edmonton. She has also commentated games for Women's Professional Soccer and she was the lead analyst for the National Women's Soccer League for two seasons.

In 2017, de Saint Aubin returned home to Minnesota to become the color commentator for Minnesota United during the 2017 Major League Soccer season. In Minnesota, she joined Callum Williams in the booth. At the time, she was the only woman employed as a match analyst by a Major League Soccer team.

On July 7, 2022, Fox Sports announced that de St. Aubin would be a match analyst for the 2022 Copa América Femenina.

On January 10, 2023, Major League Soccer announced that de St. Aubin would be a match analyst for the 2023 Major League Soccer season on Apple TV.

St. Aubin served as a color commentator during the 2023 Women's World Cup.

== Personal life ==
Kyndra de St. Aubin is married and resides in White Bear Lake, Minnesota. She and her husband have a daughter named Adelynne.
