= Joe Machnik =

American former soccer player, coach, referee, and broadcaster (b.1943)

Personal information
- Full name: Joseph A. Machnik
- Date of birth: January 13, 1943 (age 83)
- Position: Goalkeeper

College career
Years	Team	Apps	(Gls)
1962	Long Island Blackbirds		

Managerial career
- 1966–1968: Long Island Blackbirds
- 1969–1979: New Haven Chargers

Joseph A. Machnik (born January 13, 1943) is an American soccer player, coach, referee administrator, and broadcaster. He is highly regarded for his contributions to the sport in the U.S. On August 3, 2017, he was elected to the National Soccer Hall of Fame on the builder ballot.

== Player ==
Machnik was a soccer player at the Brooklyn Campus of Long Island University. In 1962, he was honored as an Honorable Mention All-American goalkeeper.

He was a member of the New York Ukrainians, winner of the 1965 U.S. Open Cup.

== Coach/administrator ==
Machnik has held the following positions:

- Head coach of 1966 LIU team that reached the National Collegiate Athletic Association (NCAA) championship game
- Coach of the men's and women's soccer team at University of New Haven; also coached the hockey team
- Assistant coach for the U.S. Men's National Team that reached the 1990 World Cup in Italy
- Coach of the New York Arrows of the Major Indoor Soccer League
- Commissioner of the American Indoor Soccer Association

=== No. 1 Soccer Camps ===
Machnik started the No. 1 Goal Keeper's Camp in 1977. The camp was later expanded to include field players, and renamed to No. 1 Soccer Camps. The camps have trained over 80,000 players, including Nick Rimando, Brad Friedel, Tony Meola, David Vanole, Briana Scurry, and Herculez Gomez. Scurry and Machnik were elected to the National Soccer Hall of Fame as part of the 2017 soccer class.

== Referee ==
Machnik's soccer refereeing accomplishments include the following:

- Director of Refereeing of MISL
- Director of Refereeing of Major League Soccer
- Director of Refereeing of National Premier Soccer League
- Member of team to run the 2017 Gold Cup Referee Candidate Course in Dallas
- Match commissioner for both CONCACAF and FIFA including overseeing World Cup qualifiers and CONCACAF Champions League games

== Broadcaster ==
Machnik is the current rules and match commentator for soccer games broadcast by Fox Sports. He started in this role during the 2013 CONCACAF Gold Cup. He has been a commentator for many games including Gold Cups, Women's World Cup, MLS, U.S. National Team, UEFA Champions League, Copa America, the 2018 FIFA World Cup, the 2026 FIFA World Cup, and the Confederations Cup.

== Author ==
- So You Want to Be a Goal Keeper
- So Now You are a Goalkeeper
- From The Sandlots To The World Cup: Inside Seven Decades of American Soccer

== Personal life ==
Machnik has a Ph.D. from the University of Utah in Parks, Recreation & Tourism.

Machnik is of Polish descent.
