= Sara Walsh =

American sportscaster

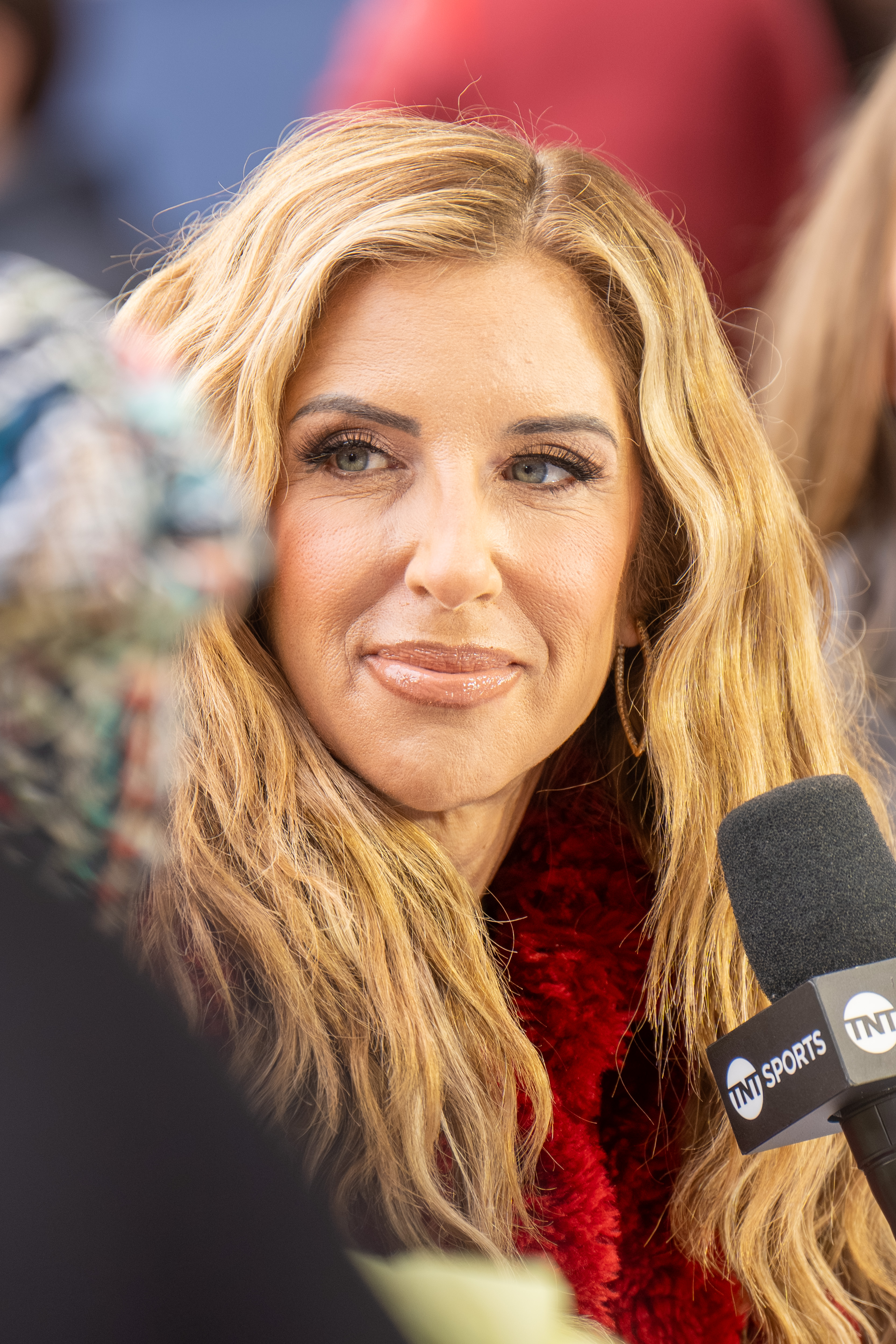
- Walsh in 2026
- Born: April 12, 1978 (age 48); Tampa, Florida, U.S.
- Education: University of North Florida
- Occupation: Sportscaster
- Years active: 2000–present
- Spouse: Matt Buschmann (m. 2014)
- Children: 2

Sara Elizabeth Walsh (born April 12, 1978) is an American sportscaster who currently works for NFL Network. She worked for ESPN from 2010 to 2017. Walsh came to ESPN from WUSA in Washington, D.C., where she served as the station's weekend sports anchor and Redskins beat reporter from 2006 to 2010.

== Early life and education ==
Walsh grew up in the Tampa Bay area, graduating from Gulf High School in New Port Richey, Florida. Walsh was a four-year starter as a forward on the University of North Florida soccer team, where she holds the school record for goals and points in a game.

== Career ==
Prior to WUSA, Walsh worked at WKRN in Nashville from 2003 to 2006, winning four regional Emmys in three years. She co-hosted the weekly Monday Night Live with Titans head coach Jeff Fisher, and hosted a weekly radio show with then Titans defensive tackle Albert Haynesworth. Walsh also served as sports director at WPGA in Macon, Georgia from 2001 to 2003, and began her career as a sports writer for the Beaches Leader newspaper in Jacksonville Beach.

She was an anchor on ESPN's SportsCenter until May 4, 2017, when she was released by the network. She was hired as a reporter for the 2018–2019 NFL season by Fox Sports. She will also serve as a studio host for their NASCAR coverage.

== Personal life ==
In 2014, Walsh married former Arizona Diamondbacks pitcher Matt Buschmann.

On February 3, 2017, Walsh announced she had given birth to twins, Hutton and Brees, a few days earlier.
