= Apple TV app =

Media player software

Apple TV
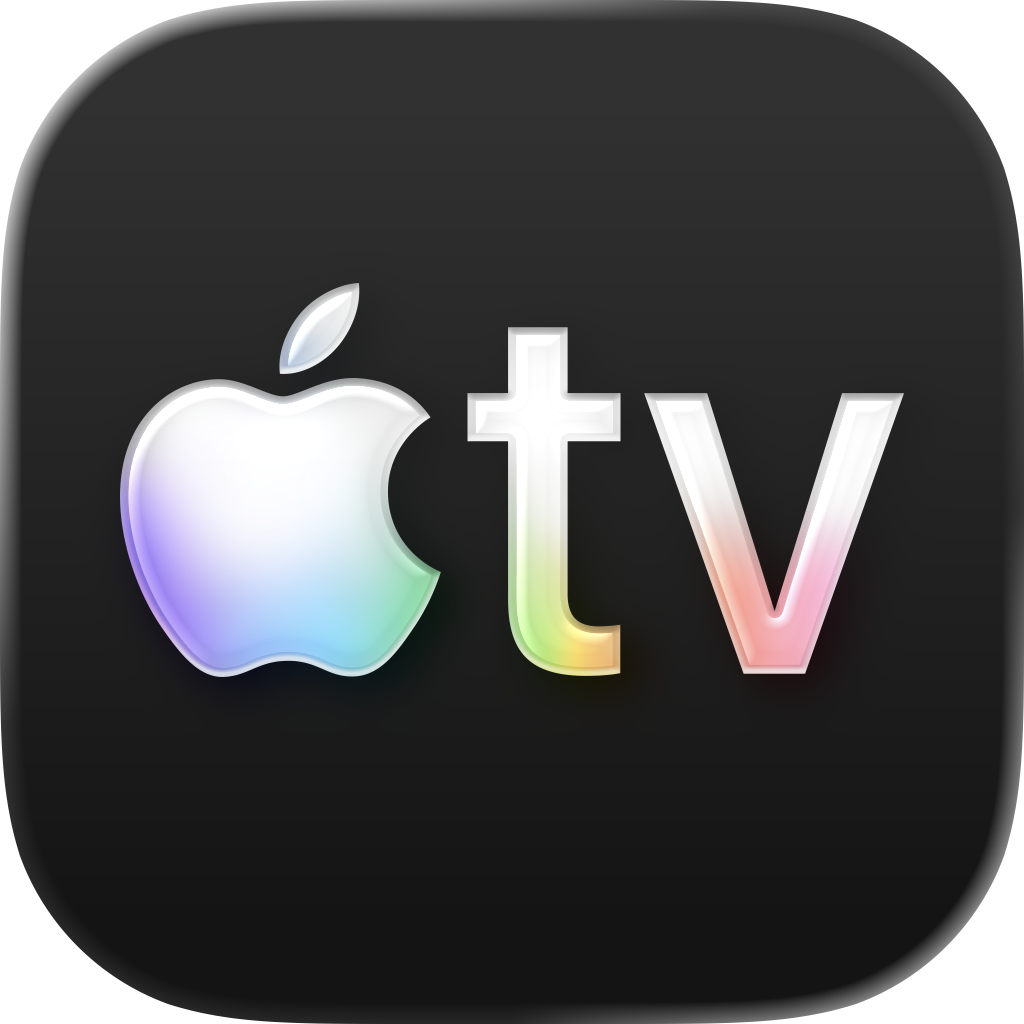
- Developer: Apple Inc.
- Platform: Apple: – iPhone, iPad, and iPod Touch with iOS 10.2 and later; – Apple TV with Apple TV Software 7.3/tvOS 10.1 or later; – Macs with macOS 10.15 Catalina or later; – Apple Vision Pro with visionOS 1.0 or later; Non-Apple: – 2016 and later Roku and Amazon Fire TV models and certain Roku TV and Fire TV Edition models; – Some Samsung Tizen, LG webOS, and Vizio SmartCast smart TV platform models, and select Sony Bravia Android TV models; – PlayStation 4 and 5 (November 12, 2020); – Xbox One (November 9, 2020); – Xbox Series X/S (November 10, 2020); – Android TV with version 8.0 or later (June 1, 2021; does not include smartphones & tablets); – Windows 10 and later (February 8, 2024; as a Universal Windows Platform app that replaces iTunes); – Android with version 10 or later (February 13, 2025; for smartphones & tablets)
- Predecessor: Videos (iOS and iPadOS); iTunes (macOS)
- Type: Video streaming; Media player
- Website: apple.com/apple-tv-app

The Apple TV app (also known as Apple TV, TV, and the TV app (Note: Referred to as simply "TV" in Apple operating systems, "Apple TV" on non-Apple devices, and the "Apple TV app" or "TV app" on Apple's website)) is a line of media player software programs developed by Apple Inc. for viewing television shows and films delivered by Apple to consumer electronic devices. It can stream content from the iTunes Store, the Apple TV Channels a la carte video on demand service, and the Apple TV original content subscription service. On iPhone, iPad, iPod Touch, Vision Pro, and Apple TV devices it can also index and access content from linked apps of other video on demand services.

The app was released in the United States in December 2016 for iPhones, iPads, iPod Touches, and was rolled out to other countries starting in late 2017. During the course of 2019 and 2020, it was brought to Macs and the third generation Apple TV and gradually, with certain feature omissions, to non-Apple devices: post-2015 Roku and Amazon Fire TV models and some newer television models on the Roku TV, Fire TV Edition, Samsung Tizen, LG webOS, and Vizio SmartCast smart TV platforms, with select new Sony Android TV models gaining access in October 2020.

== History ==
=== First-party devices ===
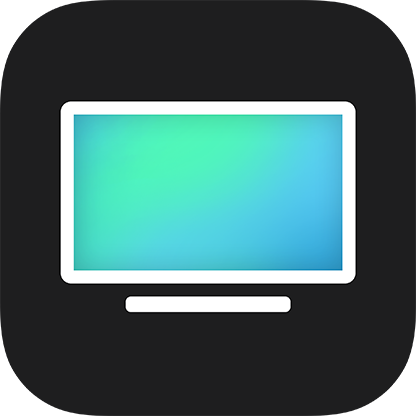
The TV app icon used in iOS and tvOS from December 2016 to March 2019

TV was announced at an Apple media event on October 27, 2016, and was released in the United States on December 12, 2016, with iOS 10.2 and tvOS 10.1, replacing the "Videos" application in earlier versions of iOS. It aggregates television shows and movies from the iTunes Store with content from installed partner apps, and can track progress across devices using the same Apple ID. Only content from Apple's services opens inside the TV app; other content is opened in the linked app.

The app originally contained five sections: "Watch Now", "Sports", "Library", "Store", and "Search". Push notifications for sports scores can be enabled.

TV received a major redesign following Apple's March 2019 media event, which refocused it as a hub for Apple-distributed video streaming. The new version added support for Apple TV Channels and debuted a new icon similar to the Apple TV hardware icon, replacing the previous icon resembling a television.

TV was added to the pre-tvOS 3rd generation Apple TV in March 2019, though this version lacks the ability to link with other video on demand apps. Picture-in-picture and switching between multiple Apple IDs was added in tvOS 13 to fourth generation and newer Apple TVs.

TV was released with macOS Catalina on October 7, 2019, as one of three applications created to replace iTunes. It supports Dolby Atmos, Dolby Vision, and HDR10 on MacBooks released in 2018 or later, while 4K HDR playback is supported on the iMac Pro and other Macs released in 2018 or later when connected to a compatible display.

TV was released for visionOS on February 2, 2024, alongside the release of the Apple Vision Pro, and includes support for viewing 3D versions of selected movies purchased through the service at no extra cost.

=== Third-party devices ===
Apple announced in January 2019 that the TV app would be made available on non-Apple platforms for the first time. The decision to expand to other platforms was cited as part of Apple's efforts to expand its service revenues by making video content available widely to the public.

It launched on Roku on October 15, 2019, on models with a 3800 model number or higher, and on the Roku TV platform. It became available on Amazon Fire TV on October 24, 2019, though limited to Fire TV devices released in 2016 or later, and on the Fire TV Edition platform.

The app launched on Samsung TVs on their customized version of the Tizen OS platform on May 13, 2019. It became available on the LG webOS platform on February 3, 2020. It was added to the Vizio SmartCast platform on September 8, 2020.

The app also launched on select 2020 Sony Bravia Android TV models on October 14, 2020. On December 16, 2020, Google announced that the Android TV version of the app would be widely made available to other devices running Android TV, beginning with the Chromecast with Google TV in early 2021. It became available on nearly all Android TV models and devices running on Android TV 8.0 on June 1, 2021.

The app became available on the PlayStation 4 and PlayStation 5 at the latter's launch in November 2020, as well as the Xbox One, and the Xbox Series X/S at launch on November 10, 2020.

The app became available for Android mobile devices in February 2025. As of version 2.2, the Android app supports playing content on an external TV or monitor with the wireless Google Cast protocol, but still does not support the DisplayPort Alternate Mode protocol widely used by wired USB-C to HDMI adapters when playing FairPlay-protected Apple TV+ content (except trailers) – even when the external display is HDCP-compliant.

The features available through the software on non-Apple devices are more limited than those on Apple devices, such as a lack of Dolby Atmos and Dolby Vision support, but additional updates have lessened the differences over time.

== Content ==
TV supports 4K, Dolby Atmos, Dolby Vision, and HDR10 on the Apple TV 4K. Dolby Vision and HDR10 are supported on iPad Pro and iPhone models (Note: iPhone 8 and 8 Plus, XR, 11, and SE (2nd generation) can play HDR10 and Dolby Vision content despite not having an HDR-ready display, done by down-converting the HDR content to fit the display while still having some enhancements to dynamic range, contrast, and wide color gamut compared to standard content.) released in 2017 or later, and Dolby Atmos on 2018 iPad Pro models and iPhones. Stereoscopic 3D content is also available to access on visionOS devices.

Content from the TV app may also be streamed via Apple's AirPlay 2 protocol from a device supporting the TV app to particular smart television sets from Sony, Vizio, LG, and Samsung.

=== Sources ===
As an aggregation service, the TV app pulls content from a variety of sources and streaming platforms for viewing. Content can be rented or purchased directly through the "Store" tab in the app, while in versions before iOS 17.2 films and TV shows would instead have to be purchased through the iTunes Store. TV also serves as the hub for the Apple TV subscription service, featuring original content created for Apple including productions by their own Apple Studios.

The versions of the TV app on iOS, iPadOS, and tvOS can also integrate and curate content from supported third-party video on demand apps installed on the same device, and can track progress across devices using the same Apple ID. Only content from Apple's services opens inside the TV app; other content opens in the linked app. Support from apps varies by country. Support for Netflix is limited; their television shows and films will appear in search results and play, but other features like curation and progress tracking are unavailable.

==== Apple TV Channels ====
Apple TV Channels is a service that aggregates content from popular video on demand a la carte subscription services and is accessed from the TV app. Announced in March 2019, it is designed to simplify subscriptions by making them purchasable and accessible in one video content hub, so the consumer need not use each service's own sign-up mechanism or view the content through each service's own app or website. It is designed to compete with similar services such as Amazon Channels and Hulu Add-Ons, which similarly make multiple subscription premium networks available in one location. The payment method can also be centralized through Apple's own billing service. Because the content is from paid subscription services, it will be ad-free. Content can also be downloaded to the device for offline viewing, and there is an option to share accounts within families.

Partners include Cinemax, Boomerang, Discovery Channel, Motor Trend, Tastemade, Starz, MGM+, Showtime, Paramount+, BET+, PBS, Curiosity Stream, Mubi, Globoplay, BBC Select, BritBox, AMC+, Allblk, Shudder, and Acorn TV. HBO was a launch partner but deprecated their channel following the launch of HBO Max, discontinuing new subscriptions and retaining existing ones for Apple users who registered for the channel before the May 2020 launch of HBO Max (while granting access to HBO Max at no extra charge) until July 22, 2021, when it was discontinued for existing subscriptions. The broad reach of the 1.4 billion Apple devices in use globally induced major services, some of which already have their own content distribution systems, to make deals with Apple.

Netflix declined to be involved with the service, with CEO Reed Hastings saying that they chose not to integrate its service's programming into Apple TV Channels because "we prefer to have our customers watch our content in our service." Netflix would have received little or no data about viewers from Apple TV Channels. AT&T CEO Randall Stephenson, during an on-stage discussion with CNBC's Andrew Ross Sorkin at a fintech event, pushed back on the suggestion that content providers like AT&T's HBO would "not have the same level of access to the data" captured from Apple TV Channels that they currently receive through their own apps and websites to "see what everybody's really watching and be able to make certain decisions", instead insisting that AT&T's digital distribution deals provide it "access to data ... critical to advertising delivery, [ ] critical to marketing".

==== MLS Season Pass ====
On June 14, 2022, Major League Soccer (MLS) announced that it had signed a 10-year broadcasting deal with Apple that would take effect with the 2023 MLS season, under which Apple would hold the global over-the-top streaming rights to all MLS and Leagues Cup matches, and selected MLS Next and MLS Next Pro matches. The service, known as MLS Season Pass, launched on February 1, 2023 as a channel in the Apple TV app. In addition to offering a discounted rate to Apple TV+ subscribers, a package of MLS and Leagues Cup matches is available for Apple TV+ subscribers, with a subset of these matches available for free.

== Release history ==
Region	Date	Ref.
United States	December 12, 2016	
Australia	September 19, 2017	
Canada	September 19, 2017	
Norway	October 31, 2017	
Sweden	October 31, 2017	
France	December 8, 2017	
Germany	December 8, 2017	
United Kingdom	December 8, 2017	
Brazil	March 30, 2018	
Mexico	March 30, 2018	
90 additional countries	May 13, 2019	
