= Prime Sports =

Former group of American regional sports networks

- Country: United States; British Hong Kong
- Broadcast area: Worldwide
- Headquarters: Englewood, Colorado

Programming
- Language: English

Ownership
- Owner: Bill Daniels/Tele-Communications, Inc. (1985–1994); Liberty Media (1994–1996)
- Sister channels: SportsChannel

History
- Launched: October 19, 1985; 41 years ago (Southern California; as Prime Ticket); November 15, 1988 (Colorado; as Prime Sports Network); 1989 (launch of Prime Sports brand)
- Closed: October 31, 1996
- Replaced by: Fox Sports Networks; STAR Sports (pan-Asia)

Prime Sports (originally known as the Prime Sports Network (PSN), and also known as Prime Network or simply Prime) is the collective name for a former group of regional sports networks in the United States that were owned by Liberty Media, operating from November 1988 to October 31, 1996. While Liberty owned many of these networks, some of Prime's member networks were owned by other companies, and carried programming distributed for the group through affiliation agreements. As a result, Prime-affiliated networks had the right to select Prime Network programs to broadcast.

Each of the networks primarily carried regional broadcasts of sporting events from various professional, collegiate and high school sports teams (with broadcasts typically exclusive to each individual network, although some were shown on multiple Prime networks within a particular team's designated market area), along with regional and national sports discussion, documentary and analysis programs.

In 1996, Liberty announced a partnership with News Corporation, under which it would affiliate the Prime Sports channels with its Fox Sports Networks.

== History ==
=== Early history ===
The group's history traces back to the original Prime Ticket (now Angels Broadcast Television), a Los Angeles-based sports network that launched on October 19, 1985. The channel was founded as a joint venture between Jerry Buss, majority owner of the Los Angeles Lakers and Los Angeles Kings, and cable television pioneer Bill Daniels, who held a minority ownership interest in both professional sports franchises, which carried most of their NBA and NHL games on the network. Prime Ticket was headquartered in a small office building across the street from the Great Western Forum in Inglewood, then the home stadium of the Kings and Lakers.

Prime Ticket caught on with cable subscribers in Southern California as it was founded at the height of the Lakers' 1980s championship run, and later got a boost from the trade of Wayne Gretzky to the Kings in 1988. It was also unique among regional sports networks, in that it operated as a basic cable channel, instead of a premium service as many of the RSNs operating at the time did.

Within a few years, Daniels bought out most of Buss's shares in Prime Ticket and became the channel's majority owner. In 1989, Daniels partnered with cable television provider Tele-Communications Inc. to form a new group of regional sports networks. Prime Ticket served as the flagship charter network, joined by the Prime Sports Network (now AT&T SportsNet Rocky Mountain), an owned-and-operated outlet based in Denver, near TCI's corporate headquarters in the suburb of Englewood. The partnership also purchased Dallas-based Home Sports Entertainment and its share of Orlando-based Sunshine Network. HSE had been in operation since 1983, while Sunshine had debuted in 1988. These four networks formed the cornerstones of the Prime Network group, along with several others already owned by TCI. Prime quickly obtained rights to the Pac-10 Conference football and secured affiliation agreements with other major regional sports networks including Home Team Sports (Baltimore), MSG Network (New York), New England Sports Network (Boston), and Pro-Am Sports System (Detroit) Prime formed a partnership with Raycom Sports that allowed to two companies to jointly-bid on rights and gave Prime the right to broadcast out-of-market games that Raycom already held rights to. Through this partnership Prime broadcast sporting events from the Southwest and Big Eight conferences.

In 1991, Prime merged its San Francisco-based Pacific Sports Network (co-owned with Viacom) with Rainbow Programming's SportsChannel Bay Area forming SportsChannel Pacific. This would be the first joint-venture between Prime and its rival SportsChannel. Negotiations about a larger partnership continued. Finally, in 1993, Liberty Media, NBC, and Rainbow formed Prime SportsChannel Networks, a joint venture in which the companies pooled programming and advertising sales between Prime and Cablevision/NBC's SportsChannel. Bill Daniels exited the partnership just before the deal was announced. Through this partnership, the two companies formed two national sports-related channels, the sports news service NewSport and American Sports Classics, a network focusing on replays of past sporting events and historical sports documentaries.

In August 1994, Daniels sold his share in Prime Ticket and the Prime Network to TCI sister company Liberty Media. On November 16, 1994, Liberty Media announced that it would adopt a unified identity for its owned-and-operated regional sports networks under the "Prime Sports" brand. The move was part an alignment of the networks that would include a shift towards a common schedule of programming across the networks, outside each outlet's own regionally exclusive sports telecasts (including the incorporation of sports-related programs aimed at women and children, and the launch of a twice-nightly national sports news program, titled Press Box; the name originated from a local sports highlights show on Prime Ticket that began airing in 1990). Liberty also created an in-house sales service to sell national advertisements for the regional networks (replacing Group W Sports Marketing). The rebrand took effect in spring 1995.

In 1995, Prime Network's retail subsidiary, Prime Sports Merchandising, purchased select sports apparel stores that maintained locations inside shopping malls throughout the United States, and rebranded them as Prime Sports Shops, using the regional networks to promote the stores.

=== Restructuring into Fox Sports Net ===
On October 31, 1995, News Corporation, which sought to create its own group of regional sports networks as a cable venture for Fox Sports, which was formed the year prior through the Fox Broadcasting Company's acquisition of the television rights to the NFL's National Football Conference, acquired a 50% ownership interest in Liberty's U.S.-based regional Prime Sports networks and its international networks Premier Sports (Australia), Prime Deportiva (Latin America) and Prime Sports Asia. Liberty and News Corporation created Fox/Liberty Networks as a holding company for the co-owned regional sports properties. In exchange, News Corporation also sold a 7.5% interest in Star TV to Liberty Media.

On July 3, 1996, News Corporation and Liberty Media announced that the Prime Sports networks would be relaunched as part of the new Fox Sports Net group, with the eight Prime Sports owned-and-operated networks adopting brands that combined the "Fox Sports" name with the state or region served by the respective network. the Prime Sports-branded affiliates were officially relaunched as Fox Sports Net on November 1, 1996.

On December 22, 2006, News Corporation sold its interests in FSN Pittsburgh (the former "Prime Sports KBL"), FSN Utah (the former "Prime Sports Intermountain West"), FSN Northwest (the former "Prime Sports Northwest") and FSN Rocky Mountain (the former "Prime Sports Rocky Mountain") to Liberty Media, in an asset trade in which News Corporation also traded its 38.5% ownership stake in satellite provider DirecTV for $550 million in cash and stock, in exchange for Liberty Media's 16.3% stake in the company. Liberty later spun off the four networks in a partial asset spin-off of DirecTV into a separate company of the same name, while Liberty also increased its share in DirecTV from 48% to 54%, and Liberty owner John Malone and his family acquired an additional 24% interest. DirecTV Sports Networks, which assumed responsibility for the four Prime-turned-FSN networks, rebranded them under the Root Sports brand on April 1, 2011.

== Networks ==
=== Owned-and-operated ===
Channel	Region served	Year joined/launched	Current owner/status	Notes
La Cadena Deportiva	Arizona; California; Nevada; Hawaii	1993	Fox Deportes, owned by Fox Corporation	Operated as Spanish-language version of Prime Ticket.
Prime Sports Intermountain West	Utah; Idaho; Montana; Nevada and Wyoming	1989	Defunct	Merged under AT&T SportsNet Rocky Mountain as a sub-feed with no distinct branding in 2017.
Prime Sports KBL	western, central and northeastern Pennsylvania central and southern West Virginia eastern Ohio western Maryland extreme eastern Kentucky	1989	SportsNet Pittsburgh, owned by Fenway Sports Group and the Pittsburgh Pirates.	Launched by TCI in 1986; known as KBL Entertainment Network until 1994
Prime Sports Midwest	Missouri southern Illinois; Indiana eastern Nebraska eastern Kansas western Kentucky	1989	Defunct	
Prime Sports Northwest	Washington; Oregon; Idaho; Montana; Alaska	1989	Defunct	Launched by TCI and Viacom in 1988 as Northwest Cable Sports; rebranded in 1989
Prime Sports Rocky Mountain	Colorado; Wyoming; Southern Idaho western Kansas western Nebraska northeastern Nevada western South Dakota	1988	Defunct	Launched by Daniels in 1988; Known as Prime Sports Network until 1990
Prime Sports Southwest	northern and eastern Texas; Oklahoma northern Louisiana; New Mexico; Arkansas	1989	Defunct	Launched by Warner-Amex in 1983; Known as Home Sports Entertainment (HSE) until 1994
Prime Sports Upper Midwest	Iowa; Minnesota; North Dakota; South Dakota; Wisconsin	1990	Defunct	Prime Sports Upper Midwest was the only U.S.-based Prime-owned outlet to cease operations, doing so on December 31, 1995.
Prime Sports West	Southern California; Arizona; Hawaii; Nevada	1985	Angels Broadcast Television, owned by the Los Angeles Angels	Known as Prime Ticket until 1994.

=== Affiliates ===
Channel	Region served	Year of affiliation	Current owner/status	Notes
Empire Sports Network	Western New York	1991	defunct, succeeded by MSG Western New York	owned by Adelphia Communications Corporation
Home Team Sports	Delaware; Maryland south-central Pennsylvania; Virginia; Washington, D.C. West Virginia	1989	Monumental Sports Network, owned and operated by Monumental Sports & Entertainment	Previously owned by Westinghouse Broadcasting, also affiliated with SportsChannel
MSG Network	New York northern New Jersey northeast Pennsylvania southern Connecticut	1989	Owned by Sphere Entertainment	
NESN	Massachusetts eastern and central Connecticut; Vermont; Maine; New Hampshire; Rhode Island	1989	Owned by the Fenway Sports Group and Delaware North	
PASS Sports	Michigan northwestern Ohio northeastern Indiana northeast Wisconsin	1989	defunct; team broadcast rights acquired by Fox Sports Detroit	
SportsChannel Pacific	northern and central California northwestern Nevada parts of southern Oregon	1989	NBC Sports Bay Area, owned by NBCUniversal	Created in 1991 as merger of TCI/Viacom's Pacific Sports Network (launched as a Prime affiliate in 1989) and Cablevision/NBC's SportsChannel Bay Area
SportSouth	Georgia; Mississippi; Alabama; Kentucky; North Carolina; South Carolina; Tennessee	1990	FanDuel Sports Network South, owned by Main Street Sports Group	Partially owned by Liberty Media, in conjunction with the Turner Broadcasting System during association with Prime.
Sunshine Network	Florida	1989	FanDuel Sports Network Sun, owned by Main Street Sports Group	Liberty had 49% ownership

==== International ====
Channel	Region served	Year joined/launched	Current owner/status
Premier Sports	Australia	1995	Fox Sports Australia, owned by Fox Sports Pty Limited
Prime Deportiva	Latin America	1996	Operation have since regionalised: Argentina: Fox Sports Argentina, owned by Mediapro; Latin America: ESPN4, owned by ESPN Inc.; Mexico: Fox Sports Mexico, owned by Grupo Multimedia Lauman
Prime Sports	pan-Asia	1991	Operation have since regionalised: Hong Kong and Southeast Asia: Defunct; Fox Sports 2 closed in 2021; Taiwan: Defunct; Fox Sports 2 closed in 2021; Mainland China and South Korea: Defunct; Star Sports closed in 2021; India: Star Sports 1, owned by Disney Star
TopSport	Brazil	1991	Defunct; replaced by SporTV in 1994

=== Prime Sports Showcase ===
Prime Sports Showcase was a short-lived sports network that focused on women's sports. It was launched in November 1994. The network reached 45 million homes. Other programming on the Showcase network included Spanish Language programming and sporting events originating from Spanish speaking countries. The channel folded in late 1996.

== Notable programming ==
The Prime Network was revolutionary in the sense that it was one of the first sports networks to provide live national coverage of regional auto racing series (such as the NASCAR West Series) and lower-division national series (such as the ARCA stock car series). It was also the exclusive live broadcast home to the USAR Hooters ProCup Series from the series' inception in 1994 until Prime Sports converted into Fox Sports Net in November 1996, when ESPN2 secured the rights to the series (running the series' races from 1997 to 1999). In addition, Prime also televised a great deal of American Speed Association races during the late 1980s and most of the 1990s, sharing the broadcast rights with TNN (now Paramount Network). The network also was the first to televise NASCAR Winston Cup qualifying sessions on a regular basis, mainly for races televised by TBS. Prime also televised a number of NASCAR Busch Series races, including the Goody's 300 at Daytona, in the early 1990s.

Prime was well known for its broadcasts of both American and Canadian equestrian competitions, at a level not since matched by any other North American television network, helping the Prime group develop a significant reputation among followers of that sport. Prime also televised the Bull Riders Only series, as well as PRCA ProRodeo events. It also televised a number of regional National Hockey League, college basketball and college football games, along with bodybuilding and wrestling matches. It would also occasionally air fitness programs (such as Body by Jake). The network was also an early broadcaster of Arena Football League games up through the early 1990s.
