= Root Sports Utah =

Defunct regional sports network

- Type: Regional sports network
- Country: United States
- Broadcast area: Utah; Worldwide (via satellite)
- Network: Fox Sports Networks

Programming
- Language: English
- Picture format: 720p (HDTV); 480i (SDTV)

Ownership
- Owner: Liberty Media (1989-2006); DirecTV Sports Group (2009-2016); AT&T (2016-2017)

History
- Launched: November 1989
- Replaced: Jazz Cable Network
- Closed: July 14, 2017
- Replaced by: AT&T SportsNet Rocky Mountain
- Former names: Prime Sports Network Utah (1989-1990); Prime Sports Network- Intermountain West (1991-1995); Prime Sports Intermountain West (1995–1996); Fox Sports Utah (1996–1999); Fox Sports Net Utah (1999–2004); FSN Utah (2004–2011); Root Sports Utah (2011–2017)

Root Sports Utah was an American regional sports network that was owned by the AT&T Sports Networks subsidiary of AT&T Inc., as part of the AT&T SportsNet brand of networks and was an affiliate of Fox Sports Networks. Headquartered in Salt Lake City, Utah, the channel broadcasts regional coverage of sports events throughout Utah, namely the NBA's Utah Jazz and college teams including the Utah State Aggies, Utah Utes, BYU Cougars, and several other schools. Root Sports Utah was available on cable providers throughout the state of Utah, and nationwide on satellite via DirecTV and Dish Network.

== History ==
=== Origins ===
In 1986, Tele-Communications Inc. (TCI) and the Utah Jazz formed a joint-venture to broadcast 20 Jazz games during the 1986-87 season to cable subscribers in five western states starting. The channel, named Jazz Cable Network was ad-supported and offered as a basic service. In addition to the 20 live games, 4 classic games were also aired. Due to a lack of other sports content, the channel was part-time and only operated during the basketball season. The number of games were increased to 25 and then 26 for the 1987–88 and 1988-89 seasons respectively. In 1989, TCI announced a partnership with Bill Daniels to combine the two companies regional sports offerings into the Prime Sports Network.

=== Network history ===
The network launched in November 1989 as Prime Sports Network Utah; owned by TCI's Liberty Media, it served as an owned-and-operated outlet of the Prime Network group of regional sports networks. In its first year, the network carried 25 Utah Jazz games. At some point, the network was rebranded as Prime Sports Intermountain West. In 1995, Prime Sports began to carry Utah Grizzlies (IHL) games when the team relocated to the state.

In 1996, News Corporation, which formed a sports division for the Fox network two years earlier after it obtained the broadcast rights to the National Football Conference, acquired a 50% interest in the Prime Network from Liberty Media. On November 1, 1996, News Corporation and Liberty Media relaunched the Prime Network affiliates as part of the new Fox Sports Net group, with the Salt Lake City-based network officially rebranding as Fox Sports Utah. The channel was rebranded as Fox Sports Net Utah in 2000, as part of a collective brand modification of the FSN networks under the "Fox Sports Net" banner; subsequently in 2004, the channel shortened its name to FSN Utah, through the networks' de-emphasis of the "Fox Sports Net" brand.

On December 22, 2006, News Corporation sold its interest in FSN Utah and sister networks FSN Pittsburgh, FSN Northwest and FSN Rocky Mountain to Liberty Media, in an asset trade in which News Corporation also traded its 38.5% ownership stake in satellite provider DirecTV for $550 million in cash and stock, in exchange for Liberty Media's 16.3% stake in the company.

On May 4, 2009, DirecTV Group Inc. announced it would become a part of Liberty's entertainment unit, part of which would then be spun off into the separate company under the DirecTV name, in a deal in which Liberty would increase its share in DirecTV from 48% to 54%, with Liberty owner John Malone and his family owning a 24% interest. DirecTV would operate its newly acquired FSN-affiliated networks through DirecTV Sports Networks, a new division formed when the split off from Liberty Media was completed on November 19, 2009.

On December 17, 2010, DirecTV Sports Networks announced that its four Fox Sports Networks-affiliated regional outlets – FSN Utah, FSN Pittsburgh, FSN Northwest and FSN Rocky Mountain – would be relaunched under the "Root Sports" brand. The network officially rebranded as Root Sports Utah on April 1, 2011. On April 8, 2016, DirecTV Sports Networks rebranded under the AT&T name as AT&T Sports Networks.

On June 12, 2017, AT&T Sports Networks announced its networks would rebrand under the name AT&T SportsNet Utah, with all network programming and on-air talent remaining intact. On July 14, 2017, Root Sports Utah was merged into AT&T SportsNet Rocky Mountain, while a separate subfeed is still maintained, Utah is no longer part of the branding.

== Programming ==
Roots Sports Utah held the regional cable television rights to the NBA's Utah Jazz. The Jazz signed a new exclusive 12-year agreement with the channel on October 20, 2009, ending the team's broadcasts on KJZZ-TV (channel 14).

The network also carried Colorado Rockies baseball, the annual Tour of Utah cycling event, and a variety of collegiate sporting events, including football and basketball from Mountain West Conference (including local favorite Utah State), Big Sky Conference football (including local favorites Southern Utah and Weber State), West Coast Conference men's basketball (including local favorite BYU), and Pac-12 Conference football and basketball (including local favorite Utah).

== On-air staff ==
=== Utah Jazz ===
- Thurl Bailey – Jazz Live studio analyst
- Craig Bolerjack – Utah Jazz play-by-play
- Ron Boone – Utah Jazz color commentary
- Steve Brown – Utah Jazz sideline reporter
- Alema Harrington – Jazz Live studio host
- Matt Harpring – Utah Jazz color commentary
- Phil Johnson – Jazz Live studio analyst
