= La Cadena Deportiva =

- Country: United States
- Broadcast area: Arizona; California; Nevada; Hawaii
- Network: Prime Network
- Headquarters: Los Angeles, California

Programming
- Language: Spanish
- Picture format: 480i (SDTV)

Ownership
- Owner: Bill Daniels/Tele-Communications, Inc. (1993–1994); Liberty Media (1994–1996)

History
- Launched: November 15, 1993; 32 years ago
- Closed: November 1, 1996; 29 years ago
- Replaced by: Fox Sports Americas

La Cadena Deportiva is a defunct American Spanish language regional sports network that was owned by Liberty Media (originally through its parent company Tele-Communications Inc., in conjunction with Bill Daniels), and operated as an affiliate of the Prime Network. Headquartered in Los Angeles, California, the channel broadcast regional coverage of sports events throughout the Southern California, with a focus on professional sports teams based in Los Angeles and San Diego. La Cadena Deportiva was available on cable providers throughout California, Arizona, Nevada and Hawaii.

== History ==
The network launched on November 15, 1993, as the only U.S.-based owned-and-operated outlet of the Prime Network that was not an English language network. The network provided Spanish language coverage of various sporting events, many of which were carried on sister network Prime Ticket, including games from the NBA's Los Angeles Lakers, the Los Angeles Kings and California Angels of Major League Baseball. It also carried coverage of college sports events from the Pacific-10 Conference as well as additional international soccer games not shown on Prime Ticket.

In August 1994, Bill Daniels sold his share in La Cadena Deportiva, Prime Ticket and the Prime Network to Liberty Media. The channel relaunched as a national network in 1995, as La Cadena Deportiva Nacional. On October 31, 1995, News Corporation, which sought to create its own group of regional sports networks as a cable venture for Fox Sports, which was formed the year prior through the Fox Broadcasting Company's acquisition of the television rights to the NFL's National Football Conference, acquired a 50% ownership interest in the Prime Network.

On July 3, 1996, News Corporation and Liberty Media announced that the eight Prime Sports networks would be relaunched as part of the new Fox Sports Net group. It subsequently announced that La Cadena Deportiva Nacional would simultaneously be relaunched as Fox Sports Americas, which took effect on November 1, 1996.
