= SportsChannel Cincinnati =

Former American regional sports network

- Type: Regional sports network
- Country: United States
- Broadcast area: southern and western Ohio; Kentucky; Tennessee; Indiana parts of West Virginia, Mississippi and North Carolina
- Network: SportsChannel
- Headquarters: Cincinnati, Ohio

Programming
- Language: English

Ownership
- Owner: Rainbow Programming Services
- Parent: Cablevision; NBC

History
- Launched: April 1, 1990
- Closed: January 28, 1998
- Replaced by: Fox Sports Ohio

SportsChannel Cincinnati was an American regional sports network owned by the Rainbow Media division of Cablevision, and operated as an affiliate of SportsChannel. Headquartered in Cincinnati, Ohio, the channel used to broadcast regional coverage of sports events throughout the Miami Valley, focusing mainly on professional sports teams based in the Cincinnati area.

== History ==
The network launched on April 1, 1990, with coverage of Major League Baseball games involving the Cincinnati Reds as its flagship programming. The initial contract with the Reds gave SportsChannel 30 games in 1990, increasing to 35 and then 40 games in 1991 and 1992 respectively. Other programming was provided from SportsChannel Ohio including basketball games from the Midwestern Collegiate Conference and Mid-American Conference. The network also featured SportsChannel's NHL package and Notre Dame football. At launch, SportsChannel Cincinnati broadcast nightly from 5 PM to Midnight on weekdays and from 9 AM to Midnight on weekends. This was expanded to a 24-hour schedule beginning on January 1, 1994.

On June 30, 1997, Fox/Liberty Networks (owned as a joint venture between News Corporation and Liberty Media) purchased a 40% interest in Cablevision's sports properties (including the SportsChannel networks, Madison Square Garden, and the New York Knicks and New York Rangers) for $850 million. In November 1997, SportsChannel was integrated into Fox Sports Net, a group of regional sports networks created by Fox/Liberty in November 1996. On January 28, 1998, after legal delays, SportsChannel Cincinnati was folded into Fox Sports Ohio, later Bally Sports Ohio, now FanDuel Sports Network Ohio (the former SportsChannel Ohio), serving as a regional subfeed of that network.
