= SportsChannel Philadelphia =

- Country: United States
- Broadcast area: Philadelphia metropolitan area Lehigh Valley; Northeastern Pennsylvania
- Network: SportsChannel
- Headquarters: Bala Cynwyd, Pennsylvania, U.S.

Programming
- Language: English

Ownership
- Owner: Cablevision (50%); NBC (50%)
- Sister channels: PRISM

History
- Launched: January 1, 1990; 36 years ago
- Closed: September 30, 1997; 29 years ago
- Replaced by: Comcast SportsNet Philadelphia

SportsChannel Philadelphia was an American regional sports network owned as a joint venture between Rainbow Sports, a unit of the Rainbow Media subsidiary of Cablevision Systems Corporation, and NBC (which both owned 50%), and operated as an affiliate of SportsChannel. Operating as a sister network of the premium service PRISM and headquartered in Bala Cynwyd, Pennsylvania, the channel provided regional coverage of professional sports teams and college and high school sports events throughout the Philadelphia metropolitan area.

== History ==
Plans to develop a Philadelphia-based SportsChannel network date back to 1986, when Rainbow Media announced plans to launch a regional sports network that would serve as a companion to the primarily movie-based premium channel PRISM, which would share the regional television rights to games from three of Philadelphia's major professional sports teams, the Philadelphia Phillies of Major League Baseball, the Philadelphia 76ers of the NBA and the Philadelphia Flyers of the NHL (the rights to the teams' road games were split at the time between independent stations WTAF-TV (channel 29, now Fox owned-and-operated station WTXF-TV), WPHL-TV (channel 17, now a CW owned and operated station) and WGBS-TV (channel 57, now WPSG), while PRISM carried home games involving all three franchises). Originally slated to launch in January 1987, Rainbow later chose to delay the launch of the channel.

After three years of delays, SportsChannel Philadelphia officially launched on January 1, 1990, with an estimated 450,000 subscribers region-wide. In addition to local sporting events, the network also carried Philadelphia Big 5 college basketball games as well as programming distributed nationally by sister service SportsChannel America, including college football and basketball games, NASCAR races and NHL games involving other out-of-market teams to complement the Flyers broadcasts. Unlike PRISM, SportsChannel Philadelphia was distributed from launch as a basic cable channel. On January 23, 1990, the Phillies reached a four-year, $12 million contract with Rainbow/NBC, awarding SportsChannel Philadelphia and PRISM the regional cable television rights to the majority of the team's games.

=== Comcast-Spectacor purchase and uncertain future for SportsChannel Philadelphia ===
On March 19, 1996, Comcast acquired Spectacor (once the original part-owner of PRISM) and a 66% interest in its primary assets – the Flyers, The Spectrum and the then-recently completed CoreStates Center – for $240 million and the assumption of a collective $170 million in debt; the new Comcast Spectacor also immediately purchased a 66% interest in the 76ers. Immediately after the purchase was announced, speculation arose as to whether Comcast would let at least some of Spectacor's broadcasting contracts with Rainbow Media lapse, and create a sports network of its own, displacing both SportsChannel and PRISM from its Philadelphia area systems (Comcast, however, had struck a ten-year carriage agreement with Rainbow for the networks in the fall of 1995); buy the existing networks; or strike a complex deal with Rainbow to have both networks retain the sports broadcast rights. Comcast approached the Phillies – whose contract with SportsChannel Philadelphia and PRISM ended after the 1997 season – about a potential broadcast deal, indicating that Comcast was taking the steps to create a new sports network to compete with SportsChannel.

After short-lived discussions with Comcast about possibly becoming a part-owner in PRISM and SportsChannel Philadelphia, on April 25, 1996, Comcast formally announced plans to create a new all-sports network of its own that would center around the Flyers and Phillies, the latter of which had signed a deal to move their games to the new network on that date. With uncertainty over its future, relations between PRISM/SportsChannel and Comcast Spectacor became somewhat strained. Negotiations to keep the Flyers television rights on the networks nearly broke down, as Rainbow placed a lower bid for the rights than what the Flyers wanted. By late September, the team announced plans to produce its home game broadcasts themselves and sell the local rights to individual cable providers if a deal was not struck.

In September 1996, SportsChannel and PRISM lost the rights to broadcast Big 5 City Series basketball games, as there was no assurance that the networks would be able to carry the full slate of games, and issues regarding whether Rainbow or the Big 5 would pay for the rights; this left the association to sell the local television rights to the City Series telecasts for the 1996–97 season (with some of the games airing on The Comcast Network). Then on October 4, 1996, the day before its season home opener, the Flyers reached a one-year contract extension with SportsChannel and PRISM, which would pay $5 million for the rights.

=== The end of SportsChannel Philadelphia ===
On June 30, 1997, Fox/Liberty Networks (a joint venture between News Corporation and Liberty Media) purchased a 40% interest in Cablevision's sports properties for $850 million; the deal was primarily struck to acquire SportsChannel Philadelphia and its seven SportsChannel sister networks to expand the national coverage of Fox Sports Net, a group of regional sports networks formed in November 1996 through Fox's purchase of the Liberty-owned Prime Sports regional networks. While the creation of the new Comcast sports network seemingly doomed SportsChannel Philadelphia and PRISM, the deal arose the possibility of one or both networks affiliating with Fox Sports Net.

Even though Comcast had already acquired the television rights to the Phillies, Fox announced that SportsChannel and PRISM would "continue to receive a heavy slate of Phillies and Sixers games". It then formally announced plans for SportsChannel Philadelphia (which would have been renamed Fox Sports Philadelphia, in accordance to the branding conventions of the Fox Sports networks) to add national programs from Fox Sports Net, while PRISM would retain its movies and sports format as a premium channel. There was some speculation, however, that Fox and Comcast could possibly partner to aggregate their respective team rights onto a single channel.

On July 21, 1997, Comcast acquired the local television rights to the 76ers from SportsChannel and PRISM, opting out of its joint contract with the two networks that was set to run until the 1999–2000 season. Comcast then reached agreements with Liberty Media and Rainbow Media to replace SportsChannel Philadelphia with the new Comcast SportsNet Philadelphia, and PRISM with the Liberty-owned premium movie channel Starz!. The shutdowns of SportsChannel Philadelphia and PRISM resulted in the layoffs of 38 full-time employees.

The shutdown of SportsChannel Philadelphia and launch of Comcast SportsNet Philadelphia created some controversy, as the latter distributed its signal using the same terrestrial microwave and fiber optic relay infrastructure that PRISM transmitted through, leaving satellite subscribers that previously received SportsChannel Philadelphia no longer able to watch events from Philadelphia area teams as Comcast exercised a law passed by the Federal Communications Commission in 1992, known as the "terrestrial exception", which allowed programmers the option of not making regional channels available to satellite providers if it does not transmit using communications satellites, blocking DirecTV, Dish Network and the now-defunct PrimeStar from carrying Comcast SportsNet Philadelphia. In September 1997, Comcast spokesperson Joe Waz said their decision not to offer Comcast SportsNet on satellite was "about competition", stating that the network could help cable "distinguish itself from satellite rivals"; however, DirecTV complained to the FCC about the move citing unfair competitive practices. Although the "terrestrial exception" loophole was closed by the FCC in a 4–1 vote on January 20, 2010, Comcast SportsNet Philadelphia remains unavailable on direct broadcast satellite providers within the Philadelphia market or nationwide.
