= NewSport =

Former American cable sports news network

- Country: United States
- Broadcast area: Nationwide
- Headquarters: Bethpage, New York

Programming
- Language(s): English
- Picture format: 480i (SDTV)

Ownership
- Owner: Rainbow Programming Holdings (Cablevision; NBC; Liberty Media)
- Sister channels: SportsChannel

History
- Launched: October 1, 1993; 31 years ago
- Closed: July 9, 1997; 27 years ago
- Replaced by: American Sports Classics

NewSport was an American cable and satellite television network that was owned by Rainbow Programming Holdings, a joint venture between the Rainbow Media subsidiary of Cablevision, NBC and Liberty Media. Predating the launch of the originally similar ESPNews by three years, it focused on 24-hour coverage of sports news and analysis.

== History ==
NewSport debuted on October 1, 1993, replacing SportsChannel America, a national version spun off of Rainbow's SportsChannel regional sports network group. NewSport developed a unique sports ticker, known as the "NewSport Score Box", which debuted in 1995 and provided constantly updated score information on ongoing games and schedules for upcoming sports events at the bottom right of the screen.

The network also aired original programs such as NewSport Talk (a sports discussion program hosted by Chet Coppock), NewSport Journal, NewSport Tonite (a nightly program featuring news and analysis on the day in sports) and Scoreboard Central (which premiered on April 29, 1995, a 12-hour sports news program that aired on Saturdays and Sundays from 12:00 p.m. to 12:00 a.m. Eastern Time). Programming from the network was used as filler on Rainbow's regional SportsChannel networks and PRISM (a Philadelphia-area movies/sports pay service also owned by Rainbow); some over-the-air television stations, like WYLN-CD, also carried NewSport programming.

The network was slow to grow in coverage, with relatively limited carriage on cable system operators besides Cablevision, owner of SportsChannel and NewSport parent Rainbow Media. Ironically, even Cablevision did not give the network full-time coverage as it carried NewSport on the channel slots also occupied by The Weather Channel on some of their systems through a time-share arrangement. At its peak, NewSport had only about 10 million subscribers nationwide. This slow growth and lack of viewers, combined with the wide distribution and success of ESPNEWS and Rainbow reportedly losing more than $20 million operating the network, resulted in Rainbow Programming Holdings deciding to shut down NewSport on July 9, 1997.

== American Sports Classics ==
American Sports Classics (named after then-sister network American Movie Classics) was a network that focused on sports nostalgia programming; it was originally set to launch after NewSport ceased operations on July 9, 1997, however its launch was postponed "indefinitely" for a time, after Rainbow Media transferred control of the network to Fox/Liberty Networks, a joint venture between News Corporation, Liberty Media and Cablevision created after News Corporation acquired a 40% stake in Cablevision's sports properties for $850 million in June 1997. When it launched that fall, the network featured a broad mix of biographical and magazine-style programs.

ASC's format contrasted with the similarly focused Classic Sports Network (which later became ESPN Classic), which at the time mostly showed archived sports event telecasts. The reason why the launch was postponed in the first place was due to problems Rainbow faced in trying to obtain the rebroadcast rights to sporting events from the major professional and collegiate sports leagues or their broadcast partners, forcing American Sports Classics to rely on the magazine and biographical programs. Like NewSport, ASC was unable to stand up to its competitors, specifically Classic Sports Network. The network ceased operations in mid-1998, shortly after SportsChannel discontinued operations upon its merger with Fox Sports Net.
