= SportsChannel =

American group of regional sports networks

- SportsChannel logo from 1995 to 2000
- Country: United States
- Broadcast area: Nationwide (available in select regions)
- Headquarters: New York City

Programming
- Language: English

Ownership
- Owner: Cablevision (1979–1998); Rainbow Media (1983–1998); NBC (1988–1998)
- Sister channels: Prime Network

History
- Launched: 1976; 50 years ago (New York Tri-State area; as Cablevision Sports 3); March 1, 1979; 47 years ago (launch of SportsChannel brand)
- Closed: January 1998; 28 years ago (most); March 2000; 26 years ago (Florida)
- Replaced by: Fox Sports Networks; Comcast SportsNet

SportsChannel is the collective name for a former group of regional sports networks in the United States that was owned by Cablevision, which from 1988 until the group's demise, operated it as a joint venture with NBC.

Operating from March 1, 1979, to January 27, 1998, it was the country's first regional sports network, and along with Prime Network, was an important ancestor to many of the regional sports outlets in the U.S., particularly Fox Sports Networks and Comcast SportsNet. At its peak, SportsChannel operated nine networks serving several of the nation's largest cities including New York City, Los Angeles, Chicago and Philadelphia.

== History ==
SportsChannel's origins date back to 1976, when Cablevision launched Cablevision Sports 3 (the "3" referencing its original channel slot on the provider), a sports network carried on the company's New York City area system. The network originated the SportsChannel brand on March 1, 1979, when it changed its name to SportsChannel New York. The network carried games from several New York area sports teams including the New York Yankees and New York Mets Major League Baseball franchises and the NBA's New Jersey Nets. One of the notable accomplishments from the channel's early days was inking one of the earliest cable deals with a pro sports team when they signed a contract to broadcast games on cable for the National Hockey League's New York Islanders in 1978 while still known as Sports 3.

SportsChannel logo, used from 1979 to 1995.

The network expanded to other regions with the launches and purchases of additional networks throughout the 1980s; the first expansion occurred when Cablevision signed a deal to televise the Chicago White Sox in 1981. However, this new network would be short-lived as the White Sox launched SportsVision the following season. Cablevision's subsidiary Rainbow Media's purchased Boston-based PRISM New England in 1983, relaunching the network as SportsChannel New England. Shortly after, Cablevision formed a partnership with The Washington Post which gave the Post a 50% interest in SportsChannel. By the end of the year, the Rainbow/Washington Post partnership purchased Philadelphia-based PRISM and SportsVision, affiliating them with SportsChannel (although the SportsChannel Chicago brand would not reappear until 1989). The White Sox returned to Cablevison, now with the addition of the Chicago Blackhawks and Chicago Bulls. In 1984, CBS entered the partnership in a deal that gave each of the three companies a one-third interest in three of the four networks and a one-sixth interest in SportsChannel New England (the other 50% was owned by the Celtics and the Whalers). The same deal would also give CBS a 50% interest in Rainbow's other networks, then-premium services Bravo and American Movie Classics. The partnership with the Washington Post and CBS would end in 1987 when both companies sold their shares back to Cablevision, citing delays in the deployment of cable television service in New York and other cities as the reason for exiting the partnership. Also, in 1987 SportsChannel Florida was launched, initially with programming from local college teams and out-of-market MLB games that SportsChannel already had rights to through its other networks. While the Florida network got off to a slow start, this proved to be a great move as it gained rights to several expansion teams in the years that followed.

=== The NHL and partnership with NBC ===
In 1988, SportsChannel would make its largest television deal, gaining national television rights for the National Hockey League from ESPN. The three-year $51 million agreement also included rights to playoff games. A national network SportsChannel America (also the new name for the group of networks) was also launched on October 6, 1988, to make the games available to cable subscribers in areas without a SportsChannel affiliate. Maryland-based Home Team Sports and Minneapolis-based Midwest Sports Channel (independently owned and operated despite the similar sounding name) would also sign-up as affiliates. Later that year, Cablevision would also gain a new partner. In December 1988, NBC and Cablevision announced that they would form a joint venture to operate their respective cable networks, including SportsChannel. Through this partnership, SportsChannel launched five additional networks in the Bay Area, Cincinnati, Cleveland, Philadelphia, and Los Angeles. The partnership also produced the Olympics Triplecast, a pay-per-view service providing additional coverage of the 1992 Summer Olympics.

In 1991, the one year-old San Francisco-based SportsChannel Bay Area merged with rival TCI's Pacific Sports Network to become SportsChannel Pacific. This would become the second regional sports network to affiliate both with SportsChannel and the Prime Network (Home Team Sports had done so since 1988). SportsChannel Los Angeles later ceased operations at the end of 1992 due to financial issues, with all of its sports broadcast contracts being acquired by the competing Prime Ticket.

=== Joint-venture with Prime and merger with Fox Sports Net ===
In 1993, Rainbow and Liberty Media formed Prime SportsChannels America, a venture in which the companies pooled programming and advertising sales between SportsChannel and Liberty's Prime Network regional sports group. Through this partnership, the two companies formed the sports news service NewSport, replacing SportsChannel America.

On April 25, 1995, NBC sold its 50% interest in SportsChannel New York to Rainbow Media for US$93 million; NBC cited that "owning a piece of SportsChannel New York made less sense" after Cablevision and ITT purchased competing regional sports network, MSG Network. NBC retained its ownership in the other networks.

On June 30, 1997, Fox/Liberty Networks, a joint venture between News Corporation and Liberty Media, purchased a 40% interest in Rainbow's sports properties including the SportsChannel networks, Madison Square Garden, the New York Knicks and the New York Rangers. Through the deal, the SportsChannel networks would be integrated into Fox Sports Net, a group of regional sports networks launched in November 1996 through News Corporation's purchase of Liberty's Prime Network group; SportsChannel New York would also be rebranded as Fox Sports New York, with Cablevision-owned MSG also becoming a separately branded FSN outlet. Weeks after the deal was announced, SportsChannel would discontinue its national programming in favor of Fox's programming and simultaneously discontinued NewSport, replacing it with American Sports Classics, a network focusing on replays of past sporting events and historical sports documentaries.

National Sports Partners, the venture formed through Cablevision's entry into the News Corporation/Liberty partnership to operate the existing and newly acquired owned-and-operated regional networks, later announced that it would relaunch the other SportsChannel networks under the "Fox Sports Net" banner. SportsChannel New York was the first to rebrand, as Fox Sports New York, on January 27, 1998. Five of the seven other remaining SportsChannel networks relaunched as member networks of Fox Sports Net later that week.

Two of the SportsChannel networks would not become part of FSN, one of them not immediately, while a third was unable to carry FSN's national programming. After Comcast acquired a majority stake in Philadelphia-based entertainment company Spectacor to form Comcast Spectacor in 1996 and announced plans to create its own regional sports network, Rainbow Media decided to shut down SportsChannel Philadelphia and sister premium service PRISM on October 1, 1997, with both networks' NBA and NHL contracts with the Philadelphia 76ers and Flyers being acquired by the new Comcast SportsNet Philadelphia (which replaced SportsChannel Philadelphia on local cable systems and additionally became an FSN affiliate; PRISM was replaced by then-Liberty owned premium movie network Starz). SportsChannel Florida was also unable to join Fox Sports Net at the same time as its sisters as Wayne Huizenga, owner of the NHL's Florida Panthers, owned a 70% controlling interest in the channel (with Rainbow Media as minority partner). Cablevision repurchased Huizenga's share of the network in November 1999, relaunching it as Fox Sports Net Florida on March 1, 2000, formally dissolving the SportsChannel brand two years after the national group effectively ceased operations. Though SportsChannel New England became known as Fox Sports New England in 1998, it was unable to broadcast FSN's national programming for a further two years because of a pre-existing contract Fox had signed with rival sports network NESN back in 1996; Fox hoped to persuade NESN to break the contract early, but this did not occur. The contract expired on January 1, 2000, enabling Fox Sports New England to become a full FSN affiliate.

=== Aftermath ===
On February 22, 2005, Cablevision acquired News Corporation's ownership interests in Fox Sports Chicago and Fox Sports New York, and a 50% interest in Fox Sports New England (with Comcast retaining its existing 50% stake), in a trade deal in which News Corporation sold its interests in Madison Square Garden, the Knicks and Rangers in exchange for acquiring sole ownership of Fox Sports Ohio and Fox Sports Florida. However, News Corporation and Cablevision retained joint ownership of Fox Sports Bay Area.

Fox Sports Chicago ceased operations in June 2006, after losing the regional cable television rights to local professional teams (including the Chicago Bulls, Blackhawks, Cubs and White Sox) two years earlier to the newly launched Comcast SportsNet Chicago. In April 2007, Cablevision sold its interest in the New England and Bay Area networks to Comcast (the San Francisco Giants later acquired part-ownership of the San Francisco-based network in February 2008); both networks became part of Comcast SportsNet, with FSN New England relaunching as Comcast SportsNet New England in July 2007 and FSN Bay Area relaunching as Comcast SportsNet Bay Area in March 2008. Cablevision later rebranded Fox Sports New York as MSG Plus on March 10, 2008. Cablevision formally exited the regional sports business when it spun-off all of its sports assets (including MSG and MSG Plus) into the Madison Square Garden Company. This was new company was (and still is) headed by James L. Dolan, the then-current CEO of Cablevision and son of Cablevision founder Charles Dolan. While Cablevision was sold to Altice in 2016, Dolan still runs the two New York-area sports networks to this day.

== Networks ==
=== Owned-and-operated ===
Channel	Region served	Year joined/launched	Current owner/status	Notes
SportsChannel Chicago	northern Illinois northern Indiana eastern Iowa	1984	defunct; became Fox Sports Chicago; network ceased operations in 2006 after losing professional sports contracts to Comcast SportsNet Chicago (now NBC Sports Chicago, owned by NBCUniversal).	Acquired as SportsVision in 1984 and rebranded in 1989; An earlier version of SportsChannel Chicago also existed in 1981 but quickly folded when it lost rights to the White Sox.
SportsChannel Cincinnati	southern Ohio; Kentucky	1990	FanDuel Sports Network Ohio, owned by Main Street Sports Group	replaced with subfeed of Fox Sports Ohio
SportsChannel Florida	Florida southern Alabama southern Georgia	1987	FanDuel Sports Network Florida, owned by Main Street Sports Group	Continued to operate as SportsChannel until 2000
SportsChannel Los Angeles	Southern California	1989	defunct, closed in 1992	Replaced Z Channel which was acquired a few months before launch
SportsChannel New England	Massachusetts eastern Connecticut central Connecticut; Vermont; Maine; New Hampshire; Rhode Island	1983	NBC Sports Boston, owned by NBCUniversal	Acquired as PRISM New England and rebranded in 1983
SportsChannel New York	New York northern New Jersey northeast Pennsylvania southern Connecticut	1976	MSG Sportsnet, owned by MSG Networks	
SportsChannel Ohio	Ohio eastern Indiana	1989	FanDuel Sports Network Ohio, owned by Main Street Sports Group	The Dolan family later established another Ohio RSN, SportsTime Ohio (now FanDuel Sports Network Great Lakes), which was later acquired by Fox
SportsChannel Pacific	northern and central California northwestern Nevada parts of southern Oregon	1990	NBC Sports Bay Area, owned by NBCUniversal	Launched in 1990 as SportsChannel Bay Area. Merged with TCI's Pacific Sports Network in 1991, rebranded as SportsChannel Pacific and ran as a joint-venture of the two companies.
SportsChannel Philadelphia	southeastern Pennsylvania southern New Jersey	1990	defunct; sports contracts acquired by Comcast SportsNet Philadelphia (now NBC Sports Philadelphia, owned by NBCUniversal)	shared rights with co-owned PRISM
PRISM	southeastern Pennsylvania southern New Jersey	1983	defunct; sports contracts acquired by Comcast SportsNet Philadelphia (now NBC Sports Philadelphia, owned by NBCUniversal)	Carried SportsChannel programming until launch of SportsChannel Philadelphia; continued a sports/movies format after acquisition

=== Affiliates ===
Channel	Region served	Year joined/launched	Current owner/status	Notes
Home Team Sports	Maryland; Virginia; Washington, D.C.	1984	Monumental Sports Network, owned and operated by Monumental Sports & Entertainment	Owned by Westinghouse Broadcasting. Carried NHL package and nightly studio show. May not have carried other programming.
Midwest Sports Channel	Minnesota; Wisconsin; Iowa; North Dakota; South Dakota	1989	FanDuel Sports Network North, owned by Main Street Sports Group	

=== SportsChannel America ===
SportsChannel America was a national version of SportsChannel that launched in 1988 when SportsChannel gained rights to the NHL. The network was available to cable subscribers in areas that did not have a regional SportsChannel affiliate. At its peak it had 12 million subscribers nationwide. It was replaced with NewSport in 1993. The name SportsChannel America was sometimes also applied to the group as a whole.

== Notable programming ==
SportsChannel broadcast several Canadian Football League regular season games produced by SportsChannel Pacific during the 1993 season, later losing the broadcast rights to the upstart ESPN2 (at the time devoted most of programming to extreme sports) through a four-year contract in 1994.

The network was also notable for providing live national coverage of NASCAR Busch Grand National races beginning in 1990, as well as coverage of the World Basketball League.

SportsChannel America aired the professional wrestling show UWF Fury Hour on Monday nights from 1990 to 1991, and later aired the live UWF Blackjack Brawl special in 1994. SportsChannel Philadelphia carried ECW Hardcore TV, a syndicated wrestling program of the now-defunct Philadelphia-based Extreme Championship Wrestling promotion from the program's debut in 1993 until the channel shut down in 1997.

From 1994 to 1997, SportsChannel America also aired NewSport Talk, a two-hour sports talk show produced by SportsChannel Chicago for sister network NewSport, that was syndicated to most of its SportsChannel-branded sister networks.

=== National Hockey League ===
SportsChannel America was the American rights holder of the National Hockey League from 1988 to 1992. The logo seen here was used from 1980 to 1995.

SportsChannel America obtained the national cable television rights to the National Hockey League from ESPN in 1988; Rainbow Sports was able to secure the rights by offering the NHL a bid of US$51 million ($17 million per year) over three years, more than double what ESPN had paid ($24 million) for its 1985–1988 contract (a move not unlike the 2005 acquisition of NHL rights by Comcast/OLN over ESPN); SportsChannel America obtained a fourth year of the contract for just $5 million in 1992.

One problem that arose with the deal was that SportsChannel America was available only in a few major markets and reached only one-third of the households that ESPN covered, limiting the national availability of its NHL coverage. In smaller markets, especially those with cable systems whose headends had limited channel capacity, the channel was only made available on a gametime basis as a pay-per-view option and often limited telecast to only Stanley Cup playoff games. The NHL terminated its deal with SportsChannel America in 1992 and signed a new broadcast deal with ESPN, leaving SportsChannel America with very little sports content outside of outdoor sports shows and Canadian Football League games.

The NHL rights deal proved for a disaster for SportsChannel, as even though it helped the national channel expand its coverage to 20 million homes within the first three years, Rainbow Sports lost as much as $10 million on the agreement, and SportsChannel America soon faded into obscurity. Some regional SportsChannel networks – which carried NHL games in their local markets – were not affected by the national network's loss of league rights.

=== National Professional Soccer League ===
SportsChannel broadcast NPSL games at least as early as the 1992–93 season. This was incidentally, the same year that for the NPSL being the top level of professional indoor soccer in the United States following the collapse of Major Soccer League. In February 1993, SportsChannel broadcast the NPSL All-Star Game from Cleveland. Lee Zeidman, Dave Johnson, and sideline reporter Keith Tozer served as the commentators for the occasion.

Besides Lee Zeidman and Dave Johnson, commentators for their Game of the Week coverage included Dave Phillips and Bob Bishop. For SportsChannel's coverage of the 1993 NPSL Finals between Cleveland and Kansas City, they employed the broadcast team of Dave Phillips (on play-by-play) and Dave Johnson.

=== Teams by network ===
Network	MLB	NBA	NHL
SportsChannel Chicago	Chicago White Sox	Chicago Bulls	Chicago Blackhawks
SportsChannel Cincinnati	Cincinnati Reds	—	—
SportsChannel Florida	Florida Marlins; Tampa Bay Devil Rays	Miami Heat	—
SportsChannel Los Angeles	California Angels; Los Angeles Dodgers	Los Angeles Clippers	—
SportsChannel New England	—	Boston Celtics	Hartford Whalers
SportsChannel New York	New York Mets; New York Yankees	New Jersey Nets	New Jersey Devils; New York Islanders
SportsChannel Ohio	Cleveland Indians	Cleveland Cavaliers	—
SportsChannel Pacific	Oakland Athletics; San Francisco Giants	Golden State Warriors; Sacramento Kings	San Jose Sharks
SportsChannel Philadelphia	Philadelphia Phillies	Philadelphia 76ers	Philadelphia Flyers
