= PRISM (TV channel) =

Cable channel based in Philadelphia (1976–1997)

- Type: Regional premium television channel (theatrical films, local sports, and special events)
- Country: United States
- Broadcast area: Philadelphia metropolitan area, Lehigh Valley, and parts of South Central and Northeastern Pennsylvania; Southern New Jersey
- Headquarters: Bala Cynwyd, Pennsylvania

Programming
- Language: English

Ownership
- Owner: Spectacor (1976–1983); 20th Century Fox (1976–1981); Rainbow Media (1983–1997); The Washington Post Company (1983–1987); CBS Inc. (1985–1987)
- Sister channels: SportsChannel Philadelphia (1989–1997)

History
- Launched: September 1, 1976; 50 years ago
- Closed: October 1, 1997; 29 years ago
- Replaced by: NBC Sports Philadelphia

PRISM (Philadelphia Regional In-home Sports and Movies) was an American regional premium cable television channel in the Philadelphia metropolitan area. Launched in September 1976, PRISM was primarily distributed through area cable systems, although it was also available through a scrambled over-the-air signal on WWSG-TV (channel 57, now WPSG) from 1983 to 1985.

The channel's programming consisted primarily of theatrically released motion pictures, although it was better known for its telecasts of sporting events, particularly those featuring Philadelphia's Major League Baseball, NHL and NBA sports franchises. Due to broadcasting restrictions imposed by the three major sports leagues, as a cable channel, the network limited its distribution to within 125 miles (201 km) of Philadelphia proper (covering an area extending from west of Harrisburg to as far north as Scranton).

== History ==
=== Launch and early years ===
PRISM launched at 5:30 p.m. Eastern Time on September 1, 1976; it debuted with a message by announcer Hugh Gannon: "Good evening, everyone. PRISM, the pay-television network, is on the air." Following this was the first movie to be broadcast on PRISM, the 1975 film The Wind and the Lion. Ten days later on September 10, the channel aired its first sports telecast: a Major League Baseball game between the Philadelphia Phillies and the Chicago Cubs. At its launch, PRISM only had six subscribers, all located in Upper Darby Township, Pennsylvania.

The network was founded by Edward M. Snider, the owner of the Philadelphia Flyers NHL team and Spectacor, co-owner of PRISM as well as the owner of the Flyers and The Spectrum; 20th Century Fox initially held a 50% ownership interest in the channel. PRISM's administrative offices were located on City Avenue in the Philadelphia suburb of Bala Cynwyd, while its studios, production and master control facilities were all situated at the event level of The Spectrum at Broad Street and Pattison Avenue in South Philadelphia.

Snider convinced the Philadelphia 76ers and Philadelphia Phillies to allow the channel to televise their home games, after the two teams expressed concern that broadcasting games would hurt attendance; the teams' concerns subsided when they discovered PRISM broadcasts had no effect on the number of spectators who attended their respective games at The Spectrum and Veterans Stadium and helped them earn additional revenue from carrying the home game telecasts.

What differentiated PRISM from other subscription television services – some of which included ONTV, SelecTV and Z Channel, and to some extent, national services such as HBO and Showtime – was that it broadcast exclusive and extensive live sports coverage, including Flyers, Phillies and 76ers games, Big 5 college basketball, boxing, and World Wrestling Federation events held at The Spectrum (the venue itself lending to the channel's tongue-in-cheek naming as viewing a "prism" allowed one to see "the spectrum"). Its sports coverage extended to sports-based original programming, such as Broad & Pattison (named after the South Philadelphia intersection where the Spectrum complex was located), The Great Sports Debate and the monthly sports anthology series Sports Scrapbook. The channel's original sports director, former Philadelphia Bulletin sportswriter Jim Barniak, served as a play-by-play announcer for PRISM's 76ers and Phillies game telecasts from 1979 until his death from a gastrointestinal hemorrhage at age 50 in December 1991, and hosted Sports Scrapbook from its debut on April 2, 1981 until his passing. 76ers telecasts on PRISM during the run of the channel featured several professional basketball coaches as analysts including Chuck Daly, Gene Shue, Hubie Brown, Matt Guokas and Jack Ramsay.

PRISM also broadcast a selection of other programs outside of sports, the most prominent being theatrical feature film releases from Warner Bros., Columbia Pictures and 20th Century Fox, along with specialized programs such as the music series Live At Rafters (which debuted in October 1993, and was recorded at the Rafters nightclub at West Chester) and the children's program block "PRISM Kids" (which primarily aired shows licensed from Saban Entertainment) from 1993 to 1996.

The network acted as a loss leader in its early years of existence, consistently losing money throughout its first five years in operation, before finally turning its first profits in 1981. On November 6, 1981, Spectacor launched PRISM New England (now NBC Sports Boston), a Boston-based cable channel which maintained a similar programming format as PRISM, and carried games from the Hartford Whalers, Boston Celtics, Boston Breakers and various New England college sports teams. In 1982, Snider bought out Fox's 50% stake in PRISM and PRISM New England.

=== Rainbow Media ownership ===
In 1983, PRISM and PRISM New England were sold to a joint venture between Rainbow Media (now AMC Networks) and The Washington Post Company; whereas the flagship Philadelphia service retained the PRISM name and format, the Rainbow-Post consortium opted instead to revamp PRISM New England into an all-sports service as SportsChannel New England, an affiliate of the Rainbow-owned regional sports network SportsChannel. That year, PRISM began to be transmitted over-the-air on WWSG-TV (channel 57; now Independent station WPSG); the station scrambled its signal during hours when it transmitted the network's programming, requiring the use of decoding equipment in order to view PRISM content over WWSG. This only lasted for two years, ending when WWSG was sold to the Grant Broadcasting System in 1985 and was converted into a general entertainment independent station as WGBS-TV.

Although it operated as a premium service, beginning in the mid-1980s, PRISM took on the unconventional model of operating as a part advertiser-supported/part commercial-free service. Occurring during a tough year for the cable television industry that saw several cable channels (such as ESPN, USA Network, Lifetime and The Weather Channel) endure major profit losses, PRISM incorporated commercials into its sports telecasts in 1984, a decision that network management was forced to make on the basis that it could not increase its subscription rates at that time without potentially alienating the network's subscriber base. Movie telecasts continued to be presented without any commercial interruption whatsoever, while content during breaks between films continued to consist solely of promotions for upcoming film and event broadcasts (with promos for scheduled movie telecasts being sourced from theatrical trailers for the corresponding film) and behind-the-scenes featurettes.

In 1985, CBS – which had already owned WCAU (channel 10, now an NBC owned-and-operated station) at the time – acquired a minority stake in PRISM. The network also owned shares in Rainbow's other cable channels, Bravo (then focused on arts programming and foreign, independent and arthouse films) and American Movie Classics (then focusing on classic films from the 1930s through the 1970s), both of which operated as niche premium services at the time. Both CBS and The Washington Post Company sold their interests in PRISM to Rainbow Media in 1987, giving the latter company full control of the channel. By the late 1980s, the channel fully deemphasized the full "Philadelphia Regional In-Home Sports and Movies" moniker in favor of branding solely by the "PRISM" acronym. In 1989, Rainbow's parent company Cablevision announced a partnership with NBC in which the latter would acquire a 50% stake in PRISM, as part of a later aborted deal that was part of their then-joint ownership of upstart business news channel CNBC (which NBC would ultimately launch on its own). PRISM was priced at $12 a month on average, 70¢ of the revenue it accrued from each subscriber of the channel was used to acquire film and sports programming rights; the rest of the revenue was divided as compensation between film distributors and local sports teams.

By 1986, PRISM had about 370,000 subscribers, most of whom received the network through a cable provider (Philadelphia proper had not been fully wired for cable television service at the time). By that time, Cablevision began to sell PRISM to cable providers as part of a package with American Movie Classics.

On January 1, 1990, Rainbow Media launched a companion basic cable channel to PRISM: SportsChannel Philadelphia, which also served as an affiliate of the company's SportsChannel network. Both channels maintained separate graphics, music packages and announcing teams until 1995, when all sports presentations on PRISM and SportsChannel Philadelphia adopted a uniform on-air appearance and began using the same announcers.

=== Later years ===
The first PRISM logo.

The original three-stripe rainbow-colored logo that PRISM had used since its 1976 launch was retired in the Summer of 1993, in favor of a modernized logo and on-air identity as part of a rebranding effort that attempted to increase focus on the channel's programming outside of its sports coverage, particularly its feature film content (the new look utilized the Univers typeface for its entire revamped appearance, that was used for all aspects of its on-air look from the logo to the text featured in graphics shown during its sports coverage). Around this time, PRISM began offering part-time simulcasts of Rainbow's national sports news channel NewSport as filler between sports programming and film telecasts. Rainbow Media launched websites for all of its television channels, including PRISM, in 1996.

On March 19, 1996, Comcast acquired PRISM's original (part-)owner Spectacor and a 66% interest in its primary assets – the Flyers, The Spectrum and the then-recently completed CoreStates Center – for $240 million and the assumption of a collective $170 million in debt; the new Comcast Spectacor (with Ed Snider appointed as its chairman) also immediately purchased a 66% interest in the 76ers. Immediately after the purchase was announced, speculation arose as to whether Comcast would let at least some of Spectacor's broadcasting contracts with Rainbow Media lapse, and create a sports network of its own to house at least some of the displaced professional franchises and college teams, thereby displacing both PRISM and SportsChannel Philadelphia from area systems (Comcast, however, had struck a ten-year carriage agreement with Rainbow for the networks in the fall of 1995); buy the existing networks; or strike a complex deal with Rainbow to have both networks retain the sports broadcast rights. Comcast indicated that a new sports network was the route it would take, as it approached the Phillies about entering into a broadcast deal. PRISM/SportsChannel's contractual rights to the Flyers were set to end that Fall, while the Phillies' contract ended after the 1997 season, leaving them both open to enter negotiations.

On April 25, 1996, Comcast Spectacor formally announced plans to create a new all-sports network centered around the Flyers, and announced that the Phillies would also move their games to the new network upon its launch. With uncertainty looming over the future of the two networks, relations between PRISM/SportsChannel and Comcast Spectacor became somewhat strained. Negotiations to keep the Flyers television rights on the network nearly broke down, as Rainbow had offered a lower bid for the rights than what the Flyers asked for. By late September, the team announced plans to produce its home game broadcasts themselves and sell the local rights to individual cable providers should a deal not come to fruition.

In September 1996, PRISM and SportsChannel lost the regional cable rights to Big 5 City Series basketball games, as there was no assurance that either network would be able to carry the full slate of games, and because of issues that arose during contract negotiations regarding whether Rainbow or the Big 5 would pay for the broadcast rights; this left the association to sell the local television contract to the City Series telecasts for the 1996–97 season (with some of the games ending up on The Comcast Network). Then on October 4, 1996, the day before its season home opener, the Flyers reached a one-year contract extension with PRISM and SportsChannel, which would pay $5 million for the rights to televise the hockey team's matches.

=== Decline ===
On June 30, 1997, Fox/Liberty Networks (a joint venture between News Corporation and Liberty Media) purchased a 40% interest in Cablevision's sports properties for $850 million, with the primary intent of integrating the eight SportsChannel networks into its recently created Fox Sports Net group of regional sports networks. While the creation of the new Comcast sports network seemingly effectively drove a stake through the heart of PRISM and SportsChannel Philadelphia, the Fox/Liberty deal with Cablevision created the possibility of PRISM and/or SportsChannel becoming affiliates of Fox Sports Net.

Even though Comcast had already snagged the Phillies' television rights, Fox announced that SportsChannel and PRISM would "continue to receive a heavy slate of Phillies and Sixers games". It then announced plans for the renamed SportsChannel Philadelphia to add national programs from Fox Sports Net, while PRISM would remain a premium service focused on movies and regional sports; although, there was some speculation that Fox and Comcast would possibly partner to aggregate their respective team broadcast rights onto a single channel.

On July 21, 1997, Comcast acquired the local television rights to the 76ers from PRISM and SportsChannel, opting out of its joint contract with the two networks that was set to run until the 1999–2000 season. Comcast then reached agreements with Liberty Media and Rainbow Media that resulted in a major change to Philadelphia's cable television landscape; Rainbow officially shut down PRISM and SportsChannel on October 1, 1997, but both channels were given designated successors: PRISM was replaced with the Liberty-owned premium movie channel Starz! (which at the time, was starting to expand its national pay television distribution beyond cable systems operated by then-sister company Tele-Communications, Inc.); for the final two months of its existence beginning on August 1, PRISM also carried select first-run movies sourced from Starz! to occupy airtime. Rainbow also offered selected programming from another of its cable channels, MuchMusic USA (now Fuse), as filler during PRISM's final few months of operation. The new Comcast SportsNet Philadelphia (renamed NBC Sports Philadelphia in October 2017, and which would eventually become the flagship property of its own group of regional sports networks) also replaced SportsChannel Philadelphia on local cable systems within the Philadelphia metropolitan area. The shutdowns of PRISM and SportsChannel Philadelphia resulted in the layoffs of 38 full-time employees.

== Legacy ==
PRISM's legacy is noteworthy because NBC Sports Philadelphia continues to distribute its signal to cable television providers through terrestrial infrastructure using only microwave and fiber optic relays, and is not uplinked to satellite. A controversial guideline imposed by the Federal Communications Commission (known as the "terrestrial exception"), that was implemented in 1992 to encourage investments in local programming, stated that a television channel does not have to make its programming available to satellite providers if it does not use satellites for their transmission.

This guideline has allowed Comcast to block DirecTV and Dish Network from carrying Comcast SportsNet/NBC Sports Philadelphia. This issue resulted in DirecTV filing a complaint against Comcast with the FCC on September 23, 1997, claiming that it used unfair monopolistic control to keep Comcast SportsNet Philadelphia from being made available via satellite (in contrast, DirecTV had carried SportsChannel Philadelphia prior to its shutdown). Consequently, market penetration by direct broadcast satellite providers in the Philadelphia area is much lower than in other cities within the United States. Comcast eventually began offering the sports network to Verizon's FiOS service in eastern Pennsylvania, Delaware and South Jersey in December 2006. The "terrestrial exception" loophole was closed by the FCC in a 4–1 vote on January 20, 2010; however, NBC Sports Philadelphia remains unavailable on direct broadcast satellite providers within the Philadelphia market or nationwide.
