= Fox Deportes =

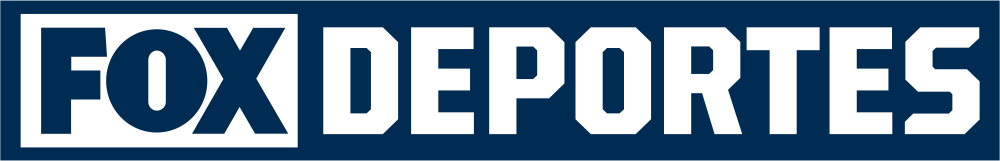
- Country: United States
- Broadcast area: Worldwide
- Headquarters: Los Angeles, California

Programming
- Languages: Spanish, English (sometimes)
- Picture format: 720p (HDTV)

Ownership
- Owner: Fox Sports Media Group (Fox Corporation)
- Sister channels: Fox Sports 1 Fox Sports 2 Fox Soccer Plus; Big Ten Network

History
- Launched: November 1, 1993; 32 years ago
- Former names: La Cadena Deportiva Prime Ticket (1993-1995); Prime Deportiva (1995-1996); Fox Sports Américas (1996–1999); Fox Sports World Español (1999–2002); Fox Sports en Español (2002–2010)

Links
- Webcast: Fox Sports app; FOX.com; (authentication required)
- Website: www.foxdeportes.com

Fox Deportes (formerly Fox Sports en Español) is an American pay television network dedicated to broadcasting sports-related programming in Spanish, aimed at the Hispanic population in the United States. Launched in 1993, Fox Deportes, a division of Fox Sports, is the first and longest-running Spanish-language sports network in the country.

Fox Deportes features a diversified programming, including NFL pre- and post-season games, MLB regular-season, All-Star Game, Divisional Series, National League Championship Series and World Series, the USGA's U.S. Open, NASCAR, Premier Boxing Champions, college football and soccer competitions including Liga MX and MLS.

The channel first launched in Southern California as La Cadena Deportiva Prime Ticket, a sister network to the original Prime Ticket regional sports network (the present day Bally Sports West), on November 1, 1993. The network was renamed Prime Deportiva on April 1, 1995, to align with the rebranding of Liberty Media-owned regional sports networks with the "Prime Sports" brand. After News Corporation (NewsCorp) formed a 50-50 sports television joint venture with Liberty Media, NewsCorp rebranded the network Fox Sports Américas on October 1, 1996. The network was rebranded Fox Sports World Español in February 1999 to align with the recently launched (November 1997) English-language soccer centric network Fox Sports World. In 2002, the network was rebranded as Fox Sports en Español before becoming Fox Deportes on October 1, 2010.

As of February 2015, approximately 21,831,000 American households (18.8% of households with television) received Fox Deportes.

== Programming ==
=== Soccer ===
The network holds rights to international soccer including MLS, Liga MX and Liga MX Femenil (matches hosted by, FC Juárez and Tigres UANL). During the 2018 FIFA World Cup, it carried replays of Fox's English-language coverage of the tournament.

On January 4, 2023, it was announced that Fox Sports acquired the English-language and Spanish-language TV rights to the Coupe de France with Fox Deportes airing most games,

On August 11, 2023, it was reported that Fox Sports bought the Saudi Pro League TV rights in both English-language and Spanish-language, making that Fox Deportes to be broadcasting games of that league from the 2023–24 season,

On October 10, 2023, Fox Deportes revealed that they acquired the English-language rights to the Mexican national team's friendly matches through the 2026 FIFA World Cup.

=== American football ===
The network began to carry simulcasts of some Fox College Football games in 2013 with Spanish play-by-play and graphics, and starting with the 2013 Thanksgiving Game on Fox, also carries select NFL games from the NFL on Fox package featuring Spanish-language play-by-play and graphics, including Fox's NFC playoffs package (Fox continues to carry all NFL games with Spanish-language play-by-play via the SAP channel, regardless of a game also airing on Fox Deportes). The network also carried Super Bowl XLVIII, a first for a Spanish-language sports network in the United States, and has continued to carry Super Bowls in years the Fox broadcast network holds the rights to the game even though Telemundo also airs the Super Bowl when Fox does.

=== Baseball ===
The network also serves as the Spanish-language home to Major League Baseball, including the MLB All-Star Game, American and National League Championship Series (AL odd years, NL even years) and World Series, and World Baseball Classic. Although the Fox network itself has expanded the availability of SAP audio since the start of 2012 to expand the availability of audio description of primetime programming and Spanish language audio to their NFL package, Fox Sports has chosen to retain Spanish audio of their MLB coverage exclusively on Fox Deportes for the time being.

=== Auto Racing ===
On October 9, 2010, Fox Deportes picked up Spanish language rights to Formula One coverage, a contract which ran through 2012. In August 2012, NASCAR and Fox Deportes made a deal to have Fox Deportes broadcast 15 races, 6 of them live, one of which is the Daytona 500.

=== Professional wrestling ===
From October 2019 to September 2024, Fox Deportes held the Spanish language rights to WWE's Friday Night SmackDown, which aired in a live simulcast with Fox.

=== Sports news and talk ===
- Total Sports 360 - Nightly news program produced in Mexico City covers sports events that are of interest to Hispanics living in the U.S.
- Punto Final - Nightly debate program produced in Mexico City. FOX Deportes commentators and reporters based in Los Angeles, California, USA; as well as Juárez, Monterrey, Tijuana, and Torreón, Mexico will appear as needed.
- El Chiringuito de Jugones - Fox Deportes in the United States holds the rights to this Spain-based nightly soccer talk show from Atresmedia's Mega, which focuses on coverage of the domestic La Liga and overall European soccer.
- Gol x Gol América - A news program covering soccer events in Latin America and the United States. Mauricio Kawas, Neptalí Valle, Felipe Valencia, and Emma Ramos are in the studio. Each episode features reports from a series of correspondents, including Gustavo Martínez (Argentina and Colombia), José Aspillaga (Peru), Feisal Rishmawy (Honduras/Central America), and Juan Andrés Ponce (Ecuador). Also featured are popular FOX Deportes talents Rodolfo Landeros and Álvaro Izquierdo.

=== News ===
On October 15, 2024, Fox Deportes premiered a Spanish-language news program—Fox Noticias—anchored by Rachel Campos-Duffy. The hour-long program airs on weekdays, and is produced by sister network Fox News Channel.

== Ratings ==
- 2011 UEFA Champions League final: 1.57 million
- Super Bowl XLVIII: 561,000
- 2015 UEFA Champions League final: 1.45 million
- 2015 Copa Libertadores finals (second leg): 979,000
- 2016 World Series Game 7: 565,000
- Super Bowl LI: 650,000 (non-soccer record)
- 2017 UEFA Champions League final: 1.24 million
