= AT&T SportsNet =

Defunct group of regional sports television networks

AT&T Sports Networks, LLC
- Country: United States
- Broadcast area: Nationwide (through regional affiliates)
- Headquarters: Atlanta, Georgia

Programming
- Language: English
- Picture format: 720p (HDTV); 480i (SDTV)

Ownership
- Owner: Warner Bros. Discovery
- Parent: TNT Sports
- Sister channels: HBO; TBS; TNT; MLB Network; NBA TV; Motor Trend

History
- Launched: May 4, 2009; 17 years ago (networks); April 1, 2011; 15 years ago (corporation)
- Closed: October 21, 2023; 3 years ago
- Former names: Networks: Liberty Sports Holdings (2009); DirecTV Sports Networks (2009–2016); Corporation: Root Sports (2011–2017)

Links
- Website: Official website

AT&T Sports Networks, LLC (ATTSN) was a group of regional sports networks in the United States that primarily owned and operated AT&T Sports Networks (founded in 2009, as Liberty Sports Holdings, later DirecTV Sports Networks, LLC). It was owned by Warner Bros. Discovery through TNT Sports. Each of the networks carried regional broadcasts of sporting events from various professional, collegiate and high school sports teams (with broadcasts typically exclusive to each individual network, although some were shown on more than one AT&T-branded network within a particular team's designated market area).

In addition to carrying team and conference-related magazine, analysis and discussion programs exclusive to each region, most of the networks (with the current exception of Space City Home Network) also broadcast nationally distributed sports events, documentary and entertainment programs through a programming agreement with Bally Sports, which is the successor to Fox Sports Networks, a remnant of their former ownership under their previous corporate parents.

While previously operating under the FSN name, these four networks relaunched under the brand Root Sports on April 1, 2011, coinciding with the start of the Major League Baseball regular season. On July 14, 2017, following the acquisition of DirecTV by AT&T, the networks (besides Root Sports Northwest as it is majority-owned by the Seattle Mariners and minority-owned by Warner Bros. Discovery) were re-branded under the name AT&T SportsNet, coinciding with the second half of the 2017 Major League Baseball season. Collectively, the networks serve 13 million cable and satellite subscribers in 22 states. AT&T SportsNet master control operations were based in Atlanta, Georgia.

On February 24, 2023, Warner Bros. Discovery announced that it would leave the RSN business. The AT&T SportsNet name was no longer used as of October 21, 2023. SportsNet Pittsburgh succeeded the network's Pittsburgh affiliate and the Space City Home Network succeeded AT&T SportsNet Southwest. SportsNet Rocky Mountain laid off all of its employees and effectively shut down on October 6, 2023.

== History ==
On December 22, 2006, Liberty Media acquired four Fox Sports regional networks – FSN Utah, FSN Pittsburgh, FSN Northwest and FSN Rocky Mountain – as part of a deal with News Corporation, which exchanged the networks and its controlling 38.5% ownership interest in satellite provider DirecTV for US$550 million in cash and stock, in exchange for the 16.3% stake in News Corporation that had been owned by Liberty. These three FSN affiliates became part of the Liberty Entertainment division, which also owned a stake in the Game Show Network.

On May 4, 2009, DirecTV Group Inc. announced it would become a part of Liberty Entertainment, and spin off certain properties into a separate company under the DirecTV name, in a deal in which Liberty would increase its share in DirecTV from a minority 48% to a controlling 54%, while Liberty owner John Malone and his family would own a 24% interest. DirecTV would then operate the four acquired FSN-affiliated networks through DirecTV Sports Networks, a new division formed on November 19, 2009, upon the spin-off's completion.

In December 2010, DirecTV announced that it would rebrand its FSN affiliates collectively under the "Root Sports" brand. The new brand was created to emphasize connections between the network and fans who passionately support (or "root" for) their local teams. The networks would, according to Mark Shuken, president and chief executive officer of DirecTV Sports Networks at the time, have a "mindset" that "enables us to go from simply covering teams and games to providing an immersive experience as a fan and for the fan." The introduction of Root Sports was also intended to signify a form of independence from FSN; however, the Root Sports networks will maintain their current affiliations with the group through a programming agreement. The Root Sports brand was phased in on the networks during the first quarter of 2011, and officially replaced the channels' FSN branding (FSN Pittsburgh, FSN Northwest, FSN Rocky Mountain and FSN Utah) on April 1, 2011. The launch of Root Sports coincided with the opening weekend of the 2011 Major League Baseball season, as Root Sports holds broadcast rights for all of the MLB teams in their respective regions.

On August 6, 2014, DirecTV and AT&T (which was in the process of acquiring DirecTV) acquired Comcast SportsNet Houston – which had earlier been granted a Chapter 11 bankruptcy protection placement through an involuntary petition filed by Comcast and NBCUniversal in September 2013 – as a 60/40 joint venture (with DirecTV as majority owner). The network was subsequently rebranded as Root Sports Southwest on November 17, 2014, becoming the first Root Sports network to not be a rebranded Fox Sports Networks affiliate.

In April 2016, following the completion of the acquisition of DirecTV by AT&T, DirecTV Sports Networks rebranded under the AT&T name as AT&T Sports Networks. Following this announcement, the channels began to downplay the Root Sports brand by replacing their logo bugs with an AT&T Sports Networks logo, restricting the Root Sports brand to station identification only. Three of the channels were re-branded as AT&T SportsNet on July 14, 2017, introducing new logos and on-air graphics. Root Sports Northwest adopted the new AT&T SportsNet graphics, but remains under the Root Sports brand; it is the only network in the group that is not majority-owned by AT&T.

Following AT&T's acquisition of Time Warner in 2018, AT&T SportsNet was moved into the WarnerMedia News & Sports division in March 2019, alongside Time Warner's existing national sports unit Turner Sports.

In February 2020, the New York Post reported that AT&T had abandoned a plan to divest the channels, after only receiving bids in excess of $500 million (rather than the $1 billion valuation it had expected). In May 2021, it was announced that AT&T would instead divest the entirety of WarnerMedia, and contribute it into a joint venture with Discovery Inc., forming a new company later announced as Warner Bros. Discovery. Discovery announced on April 7, 2022, that Patrick Crumb, president of AT&T Sports Networks, would report to the yet-to-be-named Chairperson for Warner Bros. Discovery Sports; Jeff Zucker departed the company upon the completion of the merger, but his successor Chris Licht will only oversee CNN. The merger was completed the following day. During this time until closure, the networks licensed the AT&T branding and logo.

On February 24, 2023, Warner Bros. Discovery announced that it would leave the RSN business. The company also sent messages to teams it has deals with, notifying them they had until March 31 to reach an agreement to take their rights back or acquire the networks. If no deal was made before the deadline, Warner Bros. Discovery stated that the channels would go into Chapter 7 bankruptcy liquidation. Those teams with deals with Root Sports Northwest are not affected because that channel already is majority-owned by the Seattle Mariners.

Despite the March 31 deadline passing, the Houston Astros and Houston Rockets continued to negotiate to take over AT&T SportsNet Southwest from Warner Bros. Discovery, while Major League Baseball continued to negotiate a deal to keep all the RSNs operational through the end of the 2023 MLB season. Meanwhile, the Vegas Golden Knights and Utah Jazz signed deals to move on from AT&T SportsNet Rocky Mountain to over-the-air television in their home markets. Then on August 28, John Ourand of the Sports Business Journal reported that Fenway Sports Group, controlling owners of the Pittsburgh Penguins, would take over AT&T SportsNet Pittsburgh; Three days later, Fenway and the Penguins announced that AT&T SportsNet Pittsburgh would be rebranded to SportsNet Pittsburgh on October 2. The Pittsburgh Pirates and Colorado Rockies were also reported to be considering whether to assign their local telecast rights to Major League Baseball, or sign deals with SportsNet Pittsburgh or Altitude Sports and Entertainment respectively. On September 29, the Astros and the Rockets announced that they have closed the deal to acquire AT&T SportsNet Southwest, and then rebranded the channel as Space City Home Network on October 3. On October 6, all full-time employees of AT&T SportsNet Rocky Mountain were laid off, with that network shutting down on October 21, ahead of their December 31 deadline. However, SportsNet Rocky Mountain would still air until that designated end date, with the channel's final 2 months on the air broadcasts airing some national and syndicated sports programs, including some SSN Sports shows, Sports Stars of Tomorrow, and the World Poker Tour, among others.

In December of that year, the Seattle Times reported that the Mariners would acquire full control of Root Sports at the beginning of 2024. Root Sports Northwest will close after the end of the 2025 Seattle Mariners season.

== Networks ==
Channel	Region served	Team rights	Formerly operated as	Year joined/launched	Notes	Current Name/Owner
AT&T SportsNet Pittsburgh	Pennsylvania (outside of the Philadelphia market) most of West Virginia (except for eastern panhandle) far Western Maryland southeastern Ohio extreme southwestern New York far eastern Kentucky	Professional: Pittsburgh Penguins (NHL); Pittsburgh Pirates (MLB); Wilkes-Barre/Scranton Penguins (AHL); Collegiate: Mountain East Conference football & basketball; High School & Youth: WVSSAC football, basketball, and baseball championships and regular season football; PONY League World Series	KBL Entertainment Network (1986–1994); Prime Sports KBL (1994–1996); Fox Sports Net Pittsburgh (1996–2004); FSN Pittsburgh (2004–2011); Root Sports Pittsburgh (2011–2017)	2011	Currently owned by the Pittsburgh Penguins and Pittsburgh Pirates with day-to-day operations managed by NESN	SportsNet Pittsburgh, owned by Fenway Sports Group
AT&T SportsNet Rocky Mountain	Denver, the Rocky Mountains, Utah and Nevada	Professional: Colorado Rockies (MLB); Utah Jazz (NBA); Collegiate: Wyoming Cowboys and Cowgirls men's and women's basketball (MWC); West Coast Conference basketball; Colorado College Tigers hockey (NCHC)	Prime Sports Network (1988–1990); Prime Sports Rocky Mountain (1990–1996); Fox Sports Rocky Mountain (1996–2000); Fox Sports Net Rocky Mountain (2000–2004); FSN Rocky Mountain (2004–2011); Root Sports Rocky Mountain (2011–2017)	2011	Operated AT&T SportsNet Rocky Mountain West and AT&T SportsNet Rocky Mountain Utah as subfeeds	SportsNet Rocky Mountain, ceased operations on December 31, 2023.
AT&T SportsNet Southwest	Houston metropolitan area East Texas; Bryan/College Station; Texas Gulf Coast parts of San Antonio and Austin markets Southwestern Louisiana portions of Arkansas	Professional: Houston Rockets (NBA); Houston Astros (MLB); Houston SaberCats (MLR); Houston Dash (NWSL); Collegiate: Shriners College Classic; Texas Southern Tigers football (SWAC); Sam Houston State Bearkats football; High School: UIL high school football	Comcast SportsNet Houston (2012–2014); Root Sports Southwest (2014–2017)	2014	Formerly owned by the Houston Astros, the Houston Rockets, and NBCUniversal/Comcast as Comcast SportsNet Houston. Purchased by DirecTV Sports Networks (60%) and AT&T (40%) in Chapter 11 bankruptcy proceedings. Due to the presence of Bally Sports Southwest on cable providers in its regional territory, AT&T SportsNet Southwest did not carry any programming distributed by Bally Sports.	Space City Home Network, owned jointly by Astros & Rockets
Root Sports Northwest	Pacific Northwest and Alaska, covers primarily teams from Washington and Oregon	Professional: Portland Trail Blazers (NBA); Seattle Mariners (MLB); Seattle Kraken (NHL); Seattle Seahawks (NFL) (team-related programs only); Seattle Seawolves (MLR); Collegiate: Gonzaga Bulldogs basketball (WCC); Portland Pilots basketball (WCC)	Northwest Cable Sports (1989–1992); Prime Sports Northwest (1992–1996); Fox Sports Northwest (1996–2000); Fox Sports Net Northwest (2000–2004); FSN Northwest (2004–11)	2011	In April 2013, the Mariners acquired a controlling 60% stake in the network as a result of its extended rights deal with Root Sports Northwest. Warner Bros. Discovery remained partial owners and operators of the network until the Mariners had acquired the rest of Warner Bros. Discovery's stake in January 2024.	Ceased operations at the end of the 2025 Mariners regular season.

== Related services ==
=== AT&T SportsNet Plus/ROOT Sports Plus ===
Currently, AT&T SportsNet Pittsburgh, AT&T SportsNet Southwest and ROOT Sports Northwest maintain alternate (or overflow) feeds under the AT&T SportsNet Plus or ROOT Sports Plus brand (with the network's regional name suffixed preceding the "Plus" title) for the broadcast of two or more events involving teams that the respective networks hold the broadcast rights to carry. These overflow feeds are available via digital cable, telco and satellite providers in their home markets, which may provide alternate programming when not used to carry conflicting scheduled game broadcasts.

=== Video streaming ===
Since 2017, AT&T SportsNet streaming is available to TV Everywhere authenticated subscribers. AT&T SportsNet Southwest will be added to FuboTV starting February 11, 2019, becoming the first over-the-top streaming service to provide any AT&T SportsNet channel
