= Fox Sports Networks =

American regional sports network group (1996–2021)

- Country: United States
- Broadcast area: Most of the U.S. (through regional affiliates)
- Headquarters: Houston, Texas

Programming
- Language: English
- Picture format: 720p (HDTV)

Ownership
- Owner: News Corporation (1996–2013); 21st Century Fox (2013–2019); The Walt Disney Company (2019); Diamond Sports Group (2019–2021)

History
- Launched: November 1, 1996; 30 years ago
- Replaced: SportsChannel; Prime Network
- Closed: March 31, 2021; 5 years ago
- Replaced by: Bally Sports/FanDuel Sports Network
- Former names: Fox Sports Net (1996–2004); FSN (2004–2008); Fox Sports Local (2008–2012)

Fox Sports Networks (FSN), formerly known as Fox Sports Net and Fox Sports Local, was a group of regional sports networks in the United States that was in operation from November 1, 1996 to March 31, 2021.

Launched by News Corporation as the successor to SportsChannel and Prime Sports, each of the brand's channels carried regional broadcasts of sporting events from various professional, collegiate and high school sports teams (with broadcasts typically exclusive to each individual channel, although some were shown on multiple channels or syndicated to a local broadcast station within a particular team's designated market area), along with regional and national sports discussion, documentary and analysis programs.

The networks, as well as the broader Fox Sports, were on June 28, 2013 transferred to 21st Century Fox (with News Corp spun-off as a new company), which was in turn to acquired by the Walt Disney Company on March 20, 2019. The U.S. Department of Justice approved the acquisition on the condition that Disney divest the regional networks by June 18, 2019, ninety days after the completion of its acquisition, due to Disney's majority-ownership of ESPN. Disney subsequently agreed to sell the networks (excluding the YES Network, re-acquired by original ownerYankee Global Enterprises) to Sinclair Broadcast Group, which closed on August 22, 2019. The networks continued to use the Fox Sports name only under a transitional license agreement while rebranding options were explored. A rebranding cross-partnership with Bally's Corporation took effect on March 31, 2021, with the networks rebranded as Bally Sports (later the FanDuel Sports Network), ending the Fox Sports Networks branding after almost 25 years.

Depending on their individual team rights, some Fox Sports Networks maintained overflow feeds available via subscription television providers in their home markets, which provided alternate programming when not used to carry game broadcasts that the main feed could not carry due to scheduling conflicts. Fox Sports Networks was headquartered in Houston, Texas, with master control facilities based in both Houston and Los Angeles; FSN also maintained production facilities at Stage 19 at Universal Studios Florida (which formerly served as home of Nickelodeon Studios until its closure in 2005).

== History ==
=== Beginnings ===
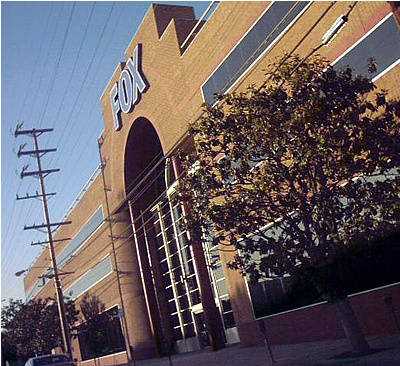
Former Fox Sports Net headquarters in Los Angeles

At the dawn of the cable television era, many regional sports networks (RSNs) vied to compete with the largest national sports network, ESPN. The most notable were the SportsChannel network, which first began operating in 1976 with the launch of the original SportsChannel (now MSG Sportsnet) in the New York City area and later branched out into channels serving Chicago and Florida; Prime Network, which launched in 1983 with Home Sports Entertainment (now Bally Sports Southwest) as its charter member network and later branched out onto the West Coast as "Prime Sports"; and SportSouth, an RSN operated by the Turner Broadcasting System.

On October 31, 1995, News Corporation, which ten years earlier launched the Fox Broadcasting Company, a general entertainment broadcast network that formed its own sports division in 1994 with the acquisition of the television rights to the National Football Conference of the National Football League, entered into a joint venture with TCI's Liberty Media, acquiring a 50% ownership interest in the company's Prime Sports affiliates Liberty in turn gained a stake in Fox's year-old cable channel FX. On July 3, 1996, News Corporation and Liberty Media/TCI announced that the Prime Sports networks would be rebranded under the new "Fox Sports Net" brand; the Prime Sports-branded affiliates were officially relaunched as Fox Sports Net on November 1 of that year. The first new network to come out of the partnership was Fox Sports Arizona which launched on September 7, 1996, nearly two months before the existing networks would be rebranded. That same year, Fox purchased SportSouth from Turner, and rebranded that network as Fox Sports South in January 1997.

On June 30, 1997, the Fox/Liberty joint venture purchased a 40% interest in Cablevision/NBC's sports properties including the SportsChannel America networks, Madison Square Garden, and the New York Knicks and New York Rangers professional sports franchises, a deal worth $850 million; the deal formed the venture National Sports Partners to run Fox Sports Net's national programming operations. In early 1998, SportsChannel America was integrated into the Fox Sports Net family of networks; SportsChannel Florida, however, remained as the lone SportsChannel America-branded network before it joined FSN as well in 2000 after News Corporation and Cablevision purchased Florida Panthers owner Wayne Huizenga's controlling interest in that network.

Former Fox Sports Networks logos

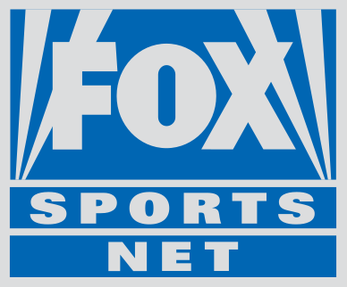
FSN logo from 1996 to 1999

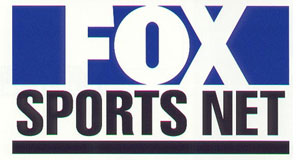
FSN logo from 1999 to 2004

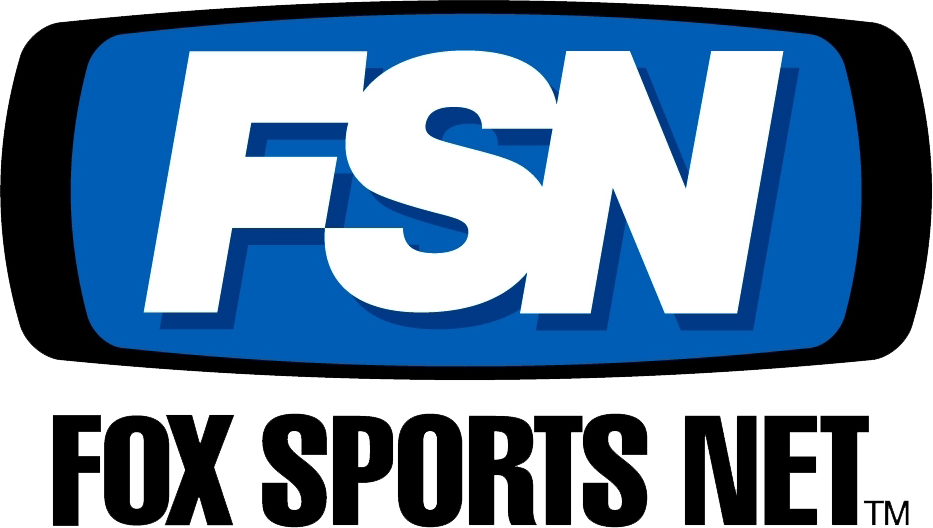
FSN "pillbox" logo from 2004 until 2008 (remained in use until 2011 by networks that would become part of Root Sports)

FSN logo from 2008 to 2012

=== Fox ownership ===
In 1999, Liberty Media (which had become a subsidiary of AT&T when AT&T acquired TCI earlier that year) sold its interest in Fox Sports Net and FX to News Corp. The sale was part of a complex transaction involving a stock swap that gave Liberty an 8% interest in News Corp, making it the second largest shareholder. News Corp became the sole owner of Fox Sports Net.

On July 11, 2000, Comcast purchased a majority interest in the Minneapolis-based Midwest Sports Channel and Baltimore-based Home Team Sports from Viacom. News Corporation, a minority owner in both networks, wanted to acquire them outright and integrate the two networks into Fox Sports Net. Home Team Sports had been affiliated with FSN since 1996. The company filed a lawsuit against Comcast ten days later on July 21, in an attempt to block the sale. On September 7, 2000, as part of a settlement between the two companies, Comcast traded its equity interest in Midwest Sports Channel (which became Fox Sports Net North) to News Corporation in exchange for exclusive ownership of Home Team Sports (which subsequently joined competing regional sports network Comcast SportsNet as Comcast SportsNet Mid-Atlantic, later NBC Sports Washington and now Monumental Sports Network).

In September 2004, Fox Sports Net became known simply as "FSN"; however, the former name remained in common use until 2010, when "Fox Sports Local" was adopted for use in referencing its regional networks. On February 22, 2005, Fox's then-parent company, News Corporation, acquired full ownership of FSN/Fox Sports Local, following an asset trade with Cablevision Systems Corporation, in which Fox sold its interest in Madison Square Garden and the arena's NBA and NHL team tenants in exchange for acquiring sole ownership of Fox Sports Ohio and Fox Sports Florida. Cablevision simultaneously gained sole ownership of Fox Sports Chicago and Fox Sports New York, and a 50% interest in Fox Sports New England (with Comcast retaining its existing 50% stake); Fox and Cablevision, however, retained joint ownership of Fox Sports Bay Area.

=== Affiliate realignments ===
Fox Sports Chicago ceased operations in June 2006, after losing the regional cable television rights to local professional teams (including the Chicago Bulls, Blackhawks, Cubs and White Sox) two years earlier to the newly launched Comcast SportsNet Chicago.

On December 22, 2006, News Corporation sold its interest in four Fox Sports regional networks—FSN Utah, FSN Pittsburgh, FSN Northwest and FSN Rocky Mountain—as well as its 38.5% ownership stake in satellite provider DirecTV to Liberty Media for $550 million in cash and stock, in exchange for Liberty's 16.3% stake in News Corporation. On May 4, 2009, DirecTV Group Inc. announced it would become a part of Liberty's entertainment unit, with plans to spin off certain properties into a separate company under the DirecTV name, which would operate the four acquired FSN-affiliated networks through DirecTV Sports Networks, a new division formed on November 19, 2009, upon the spin-off's completion.

On April 30, 2007, Cablevision sold its 50% interests in the New England and Bay Area networks to Comcast for $570 million; both networks became part of Comcast SportsNet, with FSN New England relaunching as Comcast SportsNet New England in July 2007 and FSN Bay Area relaunching as Comcast SportsNet Bay Area March 2008. Despite Cablevision's sale of the networks, the channels continued to use "Fox Sports Net/National Sports Partners" in its copyright tag until 2008 (the copyright used has since changed to "National Sports Programming").

On April 1, 2011, DirecTV Sports Networks rebranded its FSN regional affiliates under the Root Sports brand.

In 2012, News Corporation acquired a 49% stake in the YES Network, the regional sports network in the New York metropolitan area co-owned by Yankee Global Enterprises. It was also in that year that FSN/Fox Sports Local relocated its headquarters from the Fox Studio Lot in Los Angeles to Houston, and then re-branded to its current branding. The FSN owned-and-operated networks were spun off along with most of News Corporation's U.S. entertainment properties into 21st Century Fox on July 1, 2013. On January 25, 2014, 21st Century Fox then became the YES Networks' majority owner by purchasing an additional 31% share of it, increasing the company's ownership interest from 49% to 80%. In September 2013, the network gained the affiliation for FSN's national programming (sharing it with MSG Plus, the former FSN New York)

=== Sale to Sinclair Broadcast Group ===
On December 14, 2017, The Walt Disney Company announced its intention to acquire 21st Century Fox for $52.4 billion after the spin-off of certain businesses into a new entity (Fox Corporation). While the acquisition was originally slated to include Fox Sports' regional operations (which, presumably, would have been re-aligned with Disney's ESPN division), the Justice Department ordered that they be divested within 90 days of the completion of the acquisition due to the concentration of the market that ESPN would hold.

Sinclair Broadcast Group was mentioned as the most likely buyer for the other FSN networks, but would need the assistance of a private equity firm to help raise the cash needed for the purchase. The group's other sports properties include Stadium—a national sports network distributed via over-the-air digital television and internet streaming, Tennis Channel, as well as Marquee Sports Network, a joint venture with the Chicago Cubs. Over 40 parties were reported to have expressed interest, including Silver Lake Partners and William Morris Endeavor in a joint deal, Charter Communications, Discovery (who operates the Eurosport networks in Europe), Amazon, Apollo Global Management, The Blackstone Group, CVC Capital Partners, Ice Cube and LL Cool J, KKR, Nexstar Media Group, Providence Equity Partners and YouTube. Due to a clause imposed on the original sale, Yankee Global Enterprises had a right of first refusal to purchase Fox's share in YES Network. Allen & Company and JPMorgan Chase, who were handling the FSN sale for Disney, asked that all bids include YES in their offers.

Fox did not bid for the channels in the first round. On November 20, 2018, Amazon, Sinclair and CVC jointly, Apollo, KKR and Tegna officially bid for the network. It was also reported that a Sinclair/CVC joint venture was the leading bidder. In December 2018, it was reported that due to the low bids, there was the possibility that the networks could be sold individually instead of as a single group, and that the banks were in talks with those who made partial bids, such as Amazon (who only bid for the YES Network) and Charter (who only bid for Fox Sports South). Minnesota Twins owner Jim Pohlad was reportedly interested in his team's broadcaster Fox Sports North. Discovery CEO David Zaslav stated that the company had considered a bid, but that regional sports networks were a "very treacherous market".

In a January 2019 SEC filing, Fox Corporation stated that it no longer had any plans to bid for the channels. On January 11, 2019 CNBC reported that Apollo, Blackstone, CVC and other bidders except Sinclair backed out of the deal for the networks with the sole bidder being the Sinclair/CVC joint venture. It was also reported that the possibility of spinning out the channels as an independent company was also being considered. In February 2019, it was reported that Apollo and Sinclair had dropped out (but with the former seeking a new partner), but that Liberty Media and Major League Baseball had made offers. Later that month, it was reported that Pohlad and Detroit Pistons owner Tom Gores (via his private equity firm Platinum Equity) had joined the Liberty Media bid.

On March 8, 2019, it was reported that the Yankees had reached a deal to re-purchase Fox's share in the YES Network for $3.5 billion, with Sinclair, Amazon and The Blackstone Group holding minority shares. MLB also confirmed a $10 billion bid, seeking to use them to bolster the income of its small-market teams. It was also reported that month that Ice Cube and LL Cool J (via Ice Cube's 3-on-3 basketball league Big3—which had Fox as its initial broadcast partner) were also preparing a bid of around $15 billion. Big3 stated that it wanted to expand the channels to include programming covering "broader cultural and political topics" of local interest alongside sports. In April 2019, Big3 filed a complaint with the Department of Justice and FCC, accusing Charter Communications of attempting to "undermine" its bid by threatening to not carry the channels if it won the auction. Liberty Media owner John Malone has an ownership stake in Charter; the company denied Big3's allegations. The final round of bids were due on April 15, 2019, with bids having been in excess of $10 billion or higher. Liberty and MLB were reported to have partnered on a joint bid, Big3's bid contained $6.5 billion in debt and only $3 billion in outside funding, while Sinclair had re-entered contention in a joint bid with Apollo.

On April 26 and May 2, respectively, Fox Business Network and The Wall Street Journal reported that Sinclair was nearing an agreement to purchase the networks for $10 billion. On May 3, Sinclair officially announced that via its subsidiary Diamond Sports Group, it had agreed to purchase the networks for $10.6 billion, pending regulatory approval. At the same time, it was also revealed that Allen Media Group would hold an equity stake in the company and serve as a "content partner". Three senators (Cory Booker, Bernie Sanders and Elizabeth Warren) called for the sale to be reviewed by the Department of Justice, citing concerns over Sinclair's political views, and that it could use the networks as leverage for carriage agreements for its broadcast television stations.

The sale was completed on August 22, 2019. The networks would continue to temporarily use the "Fox Sports" branding under a transitional license agreement with Fox Corporation; Sinclair CEO Chris Ripley stated that there were plans to eventually rebrand them under either a new name, or to "partner with a brand who wants more exposure". There were also plans to increase non-event programming, and emphasis on sports betting in its programming. In November 2019, the Sun-Sentinel reported that Fox Sports Florida was to be rebranded "within the next few months".

Due to carriage disputes, Dish Network and Sling TV dropped Fox Sports Networks in July 2019. FuboTV dropped the channels in January 2020, and YouTube TV and Hulu + Live TV followed in October 2020.

On November 4, 2020, Sinclair took a $4.23 billion write-down on the FSN purchase.

==== Rebranding as Bally Sports ====
On November 17, 2020, it was reported by Sportico that Sinclair was considering rebranding the networks via a naming rights agreement, and was reportedly in talks with multiple companies involved in sports betting. The next day, Sinclair announced that it had entered into an agreement with casino operator Bally's Corporation to acquire the naming rights under a 10-year deal. The agreement included integration of Bally's content on the channels and other Sinclair properties (including its television stations, Stadium, and Tennis Channel), and a warrant giving Sinclair the option to acquire a 14.9% stake in Bally's Corporation, and up to 24.9% if performance criteria are met. Sinclair announced in December 2020 that it planned to launch its own direct-to-consumer Bally's-branded streaming service, including live streaming of its linear sports networks, in 2021.

On January 27, 2021, Sinclair announced that the networks would be rebranded as Bally Sports with Fox Sports Carolinas and Fox Sports Tennessee discontinued and their sports programming dispersed to the Bally Sports South and Southeast channels. To better reflect their target markets, Prime Ticket and SportsTime Ohio were rebranded as Bally Sports SoCal and Bally Sports Great Lakes, respectively. In March 2021, Sinclair revealed that the relaunch would occur on March 31, the eve of Major League Baseball's Opening Day.

By 2023, Diamond Sports Group filed for Chapter 11 bankruptcy protection. In October 2024, Diamond rebranded the channels as FanDuel Sports Network, after its partner FanDuel. Diamond Sports Group exited bankruptcy, and rebranded as Main Street Sports Group, on January 2, 2025. In February 2026, following the loss of rights to the teams to which it holds broadcasting rights, Main Street Sports Group announced that it would wind down operations in April 2026. The only station still operating is Angels Broadcast Television, formerly FanDuel Sports West, which was bought by the Los Angeles Angels in March 2026.

== Networks ==
=== Owned-and-operated ===
Channel	Region served	Formerly operated as	Year joined or launched	Year left or closed	Currently operating as	Notes
Fox Sports Arizona	Arizona; New Mexico; Utah southern Nevada		1996	2021	Defunct	Launched September 7, 1996 as first network to use Fox Sports name. Network closed October 21, 2023 as Bally Sports Arizona due to losing all broadcast rights.
Fox Sports Carolinas	North Carolina; South Carolina		2008	2021	Defunct	Launched in 2008, as a sub-feed of Fox Sports South, merged back upon Bally Sports rebrand.
Fox Sports Detroit	Michigan northwestern Ohio northeastern Indiana northeast Wisconsin		1997	2021	Defunct	Created through Fox Sports' acquisition of the local television rights to most of Detroit's professional sports teams from PASS Sports, resulting in Post-Newsweek Stations (owner of that market's NBC affiliate WDIV-TV) shutting down the latter in 1997.
Fox Sports Florida	Florida southern Alabama southern Georgia	SportsChannel Florida (1987–2000)	2000	2021	Defunct	Shares broadcast rights with sister network Fox Sports Sun; it was the last FSN network acquired by News Corporation through its joint venture with Liberty Media to retire the SportsChannel name, upon becoming Fox Sports Net Florida in 2000.
Fox Sports Houston	Southern Texas southern Louisiana		2009	2012	Defunct	Originally launched as a subfeed of Fox Sports Southwest; became a 24-hour channel on January 12, 2009. Fox Sports Houston was the television home of the Houston Astros and the Houston Rockets until Comcast SportsNet Houston acquired the rights to both teams in 2012; that deal resulted in the shut down of Fox Sports Houston on October 5, 2012, with the main Fox Sports Southwest feed replacing it on area cable providers. Comcast SportsNet Houston became Root Sports Southwest after that network went into bankruptcy.
Fox Sports Indiana	Indiana		2006	2021	Defunct	Broadcast area originally served by Prime Sports Midwest and Fox Sports Midwest; Fox Sports Indiana became a separate channel in 2006, after Fox Sports acquired the regional broadcast rights to the Indiana Pacers. It is still considered as a subfeed of Fox Sports Midwest in some markets. Fox Sports South carries select Indiana Pacers games aired by Fox Sports Indiana in Kentucky.
Fox Sports Kansas City	Kansas City, Missouri; Kansas		2008	2021	Defunct	Broadcast area originally served by Prime Sports Midwest and Fox Sports Midwest; Fox Sports Kansas City was created as a spin-off of FSN Midwest, after it acquired the broadcast rights to the Kansas City Royals from the defunct Royals Sports Television Network in a long-term deal with the team. Fox Sports Midwest remains available in the region, carrying St. Louis Cardinals game telecasts that Fox Sports Kansas City is unable to broadcast due to conflicts with Royals telecasts. Some of the channel's programming is produced by Fox Sports Midwest.
Fox Sports Midwest	Missouri southern Illinois; Iowa; Nebraska	Prime Sports Midwest (1989–1996)	1996	2021	Defunct	Cardinals games carried by Fox Sports Midwest are, respectively, broadcast by Fox Sports South in West Tennessee and Fox Sports Tennessee in northern Mississippi. Fox Sports Midwest re-acquired the local television rights to the Royals in 2008, following the shutdown of the Royals Sports Television Network, resulting in the creation of spin-off channel Fox Sports Kansas City.
Fox Sports New Orleans	Louisiana		2012	2021	Defunct	Launched in October 2012, and created through Fox Sports' acquisition of the local broadcast rights to the then-New Orleans Hornets. Network closed October 21, 2024 as Bally Sports New Orleans due to losing major sports rights.
Fox Sports North	Minnesota; Wisconsin; Iowa; North Dakota; South Dakota	Midwest Sports Channel (1989–2000)	1997	2021	Defunct	Fox Sports North operates regional subfeeds for the Minnesota/Dakotas region. The Wisconsin feed, which is not available in areas of the state adjacent to the Minneapolis–St. Paul market, was spun off in April 2007 into the separate Fox Sports Wisconsin, which also carries select game broadcasts from Fox Sports North.
Fox Sports Ohio	Ohio eastern Indiana; Kentucky northwestern Pennsylvania, southwestern New York	SportsChannel Ohio (1989–1998)	1998	2021	Defunct	Reds games broadcast by Fox Sports Ohio are televised on local origination cable channels in portions of Tennessee (including the Nashville market) and western North Carolina. AT&T SportsNet Pittsburgh broadcasts select Cavaliers games televised by Fox Sports Ohio. Separate subfeeds also exist for the Cincinnati and Cleveland markets with the Reds owning a 50% stake in the Cincinnati subfeed.
Fox Sports Oklahoma	Oklahoma		2008	2021	Defunct	Broadcast area formerly served by Fox Sports Southwest; Fox Sports Oklahoma launched on October 29, 2008, created through a broadcast agreement in which Fox Sports Southwest and then-independent station KSBI (which carried select games produced by Fox Sports) acquired the television rights to the Oklahoma City Thunder. Select Dallas Mavericks NBA games televised by Fox Sports Southwest are broadcast on Fox Sports Oklahoma in areas within 75 miles of the Oklahoma City market. The channel also carries Big 12 Conference and occasional Texas Rangers games from Fox Sports Southwest; some Fox Sports Southwest-televised games are available through the Fox Sports Oklahoma Plus overflow feed.
Fox Sports San Diego	San Diego		2012	2021	Defunct	Launched in March 2012, as a sub-feed of Prime Ticket. Network liquidated in April 2024 as Bally Sports San Diego following a settlement with the San Diego Padres relating to repeated failures to pay the team the previous year.
Fox Sports South	Georgia; Mississippi; Alabama; Kentucky	SportSouth (original; 1990–1996)	1996	2021	Defunct	Sister network Fox Sports Southeast shares Atlanta Braves and Hawks broadcast rights with Fox Sports South. Production of the Braves game telecasts aired by Atlanta independent station WPCH-TV was transferred from Turner Sports to Fox Sports South in 2011 (a byproduct of the Turner Broadcasting System's local marketing agreement with the Meredith Corporation that consolidated WPCH's operations with CBS affiliate WGCL-TV). On February 28, 2013, Fox Sports South and the then-SportSouth reached a deal with the Braves to acquire the 45-game package held by WPCH, rendering the team's game telecasts cable-exclusive beginning with the 2013 season and ending the station's 40-year relationship with the Braves.
Fox Sports Southeast	Georgia; Alabama; Mississippi; Tennessee; North Carolina; South Carolina	Turner South (1999–2006); SportSouth (2006–2015)	2006	2021	Defunct	Formerly known as Turner South, and operated as a general entertainment cable channel, from 1999 to October 13, 2006, when it adopted the name SportSouth following its sale by Time Warner's Turner Broadcasting System subsidiary to then Fox Sports Networks parent News Corporation. SportSouth and Fox Sports South aired Atlanta Thrashers games until the team's relocation to Winnipeg (as the Winnipeg Jets) in 2011. Fox Sports South carries select Memphis Grizzlies games aired by SportSouth in Kentucky. SportSouth was rebranded as Fox Sports Southeast on October 5, 2015, citing viewer confusion caused by the Fox Sports Networks' 2012 rebranding that replaced the "FS" with "Fox Sports" as a prefix for the regional outlets.
Fox Sports Southwest	Texas; Arkansas northern Louisiana parts of New Mexico	Home Sports Entertainment (1983–1994); Prime Sports Southwest (1994–1996)	1996	2021	Defunct	
Fox Sports Sun	Florida	Sunshine Network (1988–2004); Sun Sports (2004–2015)	1996	2021	Defunct	Originally a Prime Network affiliate, Fox Sports and Liberty Media acquired the network in 1996.
Fox Sports Tennessee	Tennessee southern Kentucky		2008	2021	Defunct	Launched in 2008, as a sub-feed of Fox Sports South. Merged back upon Bally Sports rebrand.
Fox Sports West	Southern California; Southern Nevada; Hawaii	Prime Ticket (original; 1985–1994); Prime Sports West (1994–1996)	1996	2021	Angels Broadcast Television	Fox Sports West lost the broadcast rights to the Los Angeles Lakers after the 2011–12 NBA season, as a result of a 20-year agreement with Time Warner Cable (now Charter Communications) to broadcast the team's games on Spectrum SportsNet and Spectrum Deportes, which both launched in October 2012; Formerly held the rights to the Los Angeles Sparks and the Los Angeles Galaxy before losing them to Spectrum. Purchased by the LA Angels in 2026.
Fox Sports Wisconsin	Wisconsin western Upper Peninsula of Michigan eastern Minnesota northwestern Illinois; Iowa		2007	2021	Defunct	Formerly operated as a sub-feed of Fox Sports North beginning in 1998, Fox Sports Wisconsin became a separate channel in 2008 after Fox Sports North acquired the broadcast rights to the Milwaukee Brewers. It is still considered a sub-feed of Fox Sports North in some markets, and carries Minnesota Wild and Minnesota United FC games, which air on the alternate feed if the main feed is otherwise occupied. Fox Sports Wisconsin maintains master control and certain back office operations shared with Fox Sports North at the latter channel's headquarters in Minneapolis, but maintains separate production operations based in Milwaukee.
Prime Ticket	Southern California; Southern Nevada; Hawaii	Fox Sports West 2 (1997–2006)	1997	2021	Defunct	Prime Ticket aired Los Angeles Dodgers games from 1997 to 2013 when Fox lost the broadcast rights to Spectrum SportsNet LA, a joint venture between the team and Time Warner Cable that launched in April 2014.
SportsTime Ohio	Ohio eastern Indiana; Kentucky northwestern Pennsylvania southwestern New York		2012	2021	Defunct	Launched in 2006, after the Cleveland Indians declined to renew its broadcast contract with Fox Sports Ohio; Fox would eventually purchase the network on December 28, 2012.

=== Affiliates ===
Channel	Region served	Formerly operated as	Year joined or launched	Year left or closed	Currently operating as	Notes
AT&T SportsNet Pittsburgh	Pennsylvania; West Virginia parts of Maryland, Kentucky and Ohio	KBL Entertainment Network (1986–1995) Prime Sports KBL (1995–1996); Fox Sports Pittsburgh (1996–2011); Root Sports Pittsburgh (2011–2017)	1996	2021	SportsNet Pittsburgh	Acquired by Liberty Media in 2008 as part of an asset swap with then-Fox Sports owner News Corporation, these networks were spun off into the AT&T Sports Networks division of DirecTV in 2009. DirecTV's Fox Sports affiliates were rebranded as Root Sports on April 1, 2011, and all except Northwest later rebranded as AT&T SportsNet in 2017 after AT&T acquired DirecTV two years earlier. AT&T SportsNet Southwest is the only network in the group that does not air Bally Sports-sourced programming.
AT&T SportsNet Rocky Mountain/Rocky Mountain West	Colorado; New Mexico; Nevada; Utah; Wyoming parts of Arizona, California, Idaho, Nebraska and South Dakota	Prime Sports Network (1988–1989); Prime Sports Network- Rocky Mountain (1989–1995); Prime Sports Rocky Mountain (1995–1996); Fox Sports Rocky Mountain (1996–2011); Root Sports Rocky Mountain (2011–2017)	1996	2021	Defunct	Rebranded as SportsNet Rocky Mountain in October 2023, before ceasing operations on December 31, 2023.
BayTV	San Francisco Bay Area		1997	2000	Defunct	Partially owned by TCI; signed a three-year affiliation agreement in March 1997 due to Cablevision's initial refusal to allow SportsChannel Pacific to carry FSN programming. Carried Fox Sports News, Pac-10 games and Thursday Night Baseball. Fox Sports News was moved to Fox Sports Bay Area in March 1998, but Pac-10 games continued to air on BayTV until January 2000.
Comcast SportsNet Bay Area	Northern and central California northwestern Nevada parts of southern Oregon	Pacific Sports Network (PSN) (1989–1991); SportsChannel Bay Area (1990–1991); SportsChannel Pacific (1991–1998); Fox Sports Bay Area (1998–2008)	1998	2012	NBC Sports Bay Area	In April 2007, Cablevision sold its 60% interest in FSN Bay Area to Comcast. The network was rebranded as Comcast SportsNet Bay Area on March 31, 2008, and continued to carry select FSN programming until August 2012. Fox Sports sold its stake in the network to Comcast in April 2008. Continued affiliation as Comcast SportsNet Bay Area until 2012. Programming sometimes aired on Comcast SportsNet California.
Comcast SportsNet Chicago	Northern Illinois northern Indiana eastern Iowa		2006	2012	Defunct	Affiliated after closure of Fox Sports Chicago. Rebranded as NBC Sports Chicago on October 2, 2017. NBC Sports Chicago discontinued service on September 30, 2024, following its loss of local broadcast rights to the Bulls, Blackhawks and White Sox.
Comcast SportsNet Mid-Atlantic	Maryland; Virginia; Washington, D.C. southern Pennsylvania eastern West Virginia southern Delaware	Home Team Sports (1984–2001)	1997	2012	Monumental Sports Network	Comcast SportsNet Mid-Atlantic rebranded as NBC Sports Washington on October 2, 2017. NBC Sports Washington rebranded as Monumental Sports Network on September 12, 2023.
Comcast SportsNet New England	Massachusetts eastern and central Connecticut; Vermont; Maine; New Hampshire; Rhode Island	PRISM New England (1981–1983); SportsChannel New England (1983–1998); Fox Sports New England (1998–2007)	2000	2012	NBC Sports Boston	Rebranded in January 1998, along with the other former SportsChannel RSNs. Despite the new name, the network was blocked from affiliating with FSN until January 1, 2000, due to an existing agreement with the New England Sports Network. In April 2007, Cablevision sold its 50% interest in FSN New England to Comcast, effectively giving the latter full ownership of the channel. It was rebranded as Comcast SportsNet New England on July 1, 2007, and continued to carry select FSN programming until August 2012.
Comcast SportsNet Philadelphia	Eastern Pennsylvania; South Jersey; Delaware		1997	2012	NBC Sports Philadelphia	
Empire Sports Network	Upstate New York northern Pennsylvania eastern Ohio		1996	2005	Defunct	Previously a Prime Network affiliate, it became an FSN affiliate by default in 1996, though it did not use FSN branding. The channel was shuttered in 2005 (due to the bankruptcy of parent company Adelphia) and was replaced by MSG Network and later MSG Western New York.
Fox Sports Chicago	Northern Illinois northern Indiana eastern Iowa	Sportsvision Chicago (1982–1989); SportsChannel Chicago (1989–1998)	1998	2006	Defunct	FSN Chicago served as the production hub for the Chicago Sports Report, Ohio Sports Report and Bay Area Sports Report (all of which were 50% owned by Rainbow Sports/Cablevision). NBC Sports Chicago aired FSN's national programming from 2006 until August 2012, and occupied FSN Chicago's former facilities at 350 North Orleans Street, which also houses the offices of the Chicago Sun-Times. The former Chicago Sports Report set was purchased by NBC affiliate WREX in Rockford, Illinois for use as that station's main news set. FSN Chicago shut down on June 23, 2006.
Marquee Sports Network	Illinois, Indiana, Iowa, parts of Wisconsin		2020	2021		Launched in 2020 and co-owned by Sinclair Broadcast Group and Chicago Cubs, restoring Fox Sports Network programming to the Chicago market after more than a five-year absence.
Mid-Atlantic Sports Network	Washington, D.C., Maryland, Virginia, North Carolina, West Virginia, Pennsylvania and Delaware		2013	2021		Aired most Fox Sports-sourced programming on MASN2.
MSG Network	New York northern New Jersey northeast Pennsylvania southern Connecticut		1998	2021		After Cablevision became a partner in FSN and converted their SportsChannel networks to the FSN banner, MSG Network also became an FSN outlet, albeit keeping its own branding and graphics (a variant of the MSG logo of the time with a Fox Sports Net logo underneath was used on occasion). MSG carried FSN programming at different times to FSN New York and also contributed footage to FSN programs. (Prior to either MSG or SportsChannel New York, then-independent station WBIS-TV, now WPXN-TV, carried FSN programming as part of its sports offerings.)
MSG Plus	New York northern New Jersey northeast Pennsylvania southern Connecticut	Cablevision Sports 3 (1976–1979); SportsChannel New York (1979–1998); Fox Sports New York (1998–2008)	1998	2021	MSG Sportsnet (MSGSN)	Operates as a sister network of MSG Network; Owned by MSG Networks, a spin-off of Cablevision. Fox previously had partial ownership of the network. It was rebranded as MSG Plus on March 10, 2008. Starting in 2013, MSG Plus aired a reduced schedule of Fox Sports programming, with certain other programs airing on YES Network. MSG Plus was rebranded as MSG Sportnet (MSGSN) on September 26, 2022.
New England Sports Network	Massachusetts, eastern and central Connecticut, Vermont, Maine, New Hampshire and Rhode Island		1996	1999		SportsChannel New England rebranded to Fox Sports New England in January 1998, but carried no FSN national programming until NESN's contract expired on December 31, 1999.
Root Sports Northwest	Washington; Alaska; Montana; Oregon; Western Idaho	Northwest Cable Sports (1988–1989); Prime Sports Northwest (1989–1996); Fox Sports Northwest (1996–2011)	1996	2021	Defunct	Last Root Sports branded channel. Ceased operations when MLB Local Media took over production of Seattle Mariners games.
Root Sports Utah	Utah	Prime Sports Network- Utah (1989–1990); Prime Sports Network- Intermountain West (1991–1995); Prime Sports Intermountain West (1995–1996); Fox Sports Utah (1996–2011)	1996	2017	Merged into AT&T Sportsnet Rocky Mountain	
Wisconsin Sports Channel	Wisconsin	Wisconsin Sports Network (1996–1997)	1997	1997	FanDuel Sports Network Wisconsin	Merged into Midwest Sports Channel (later known as Fox Sports North) and then split again to form Fox Sports Wisconsin
YES Network	New York northern New Jersey northeast Pennsylvania southern Connecticut		2013	2021		Launched in 2002, News Corporation acquired a 49% stake in YES in November 2012, in a deal that included an option to allow the company to expand its interest in the network to 80% within three years. The option carried over to 21st Century Fox, following its founding through the subsequent 2013 spin-off of News Corporation's entertainment assets, which exercised the option for Fox Sports to acquire 80% majority control of YES (with the network's founding parent Yankees Global Enterprises retaining the remaining 20%) in January 2014. YES later began carrying Fox Sports-sourced programming in September 2013; prior to the Fox Sports purchase, YES had carried select Yankees game telecasts over-the-air broadcast on Fox-owned MyNetworkTV station WWOR-TV and the Tribune-owned station WPIX. On December 14, 2017, The Walt Disney Company announced their intent to acquire 21st Century Fox for $52.4 billion after the spin-off of certain businesses to a "New Fox" company, while the acquisition was originally slated to include Fox Sports' regional operations, the Justice Department ordered their divestment under antitrust grounds, citing Disney's ownership of ESPN. Yankee Global Enterprises invoked a clause the rights to buy their stake of the YES Network back following the acquisition from Disney. On March 8, 2019, it was reported that the Yankees had reached a deal to re-purchase Fox's share in the network for $3.5 billion, with Sinclair Broadcast Group, Amazon.com and The Blackstone Group holding minority shares.

=== Partner services ===
==== Comcast SportsNet ====
From its inception in 1997 until July 31, 2012, Comcast maintained an agreement to carry select programming sourced from Fox Sports Net on its six Comcast SportsNet regional networks: Comcast SportsNet Bay Area, Comcast SportsNet California, Comcast SportsNet Chicago, Comcast SportsNet Mid-Atlantic, Comcast SportsNet New England and Comcast SportsNet Philadelphia.

This deal stemmed from the circumstances surrounding the 1997 launch of the original Comcast SportsNet in Philadelphia, where Rainbow's regional sports network SportsChannel Philadelphia, and sister premium service PRISM (which offered a mix of sports and movies) were seemingly gutted by Comcast's acquisition of Spectacor—owner of the Philadelphia Flyers—and a stake in the Philadelphia 76ers, with plans to launch their own network, only for Rainbow to join Fox and Liberty, possibly meaning SportsChannel and PRISM would become FSN affiliates instead. Ultimately, the potential issues were settled in a deal that saw PRISM and SportsChannel's local coverage move to Comcast SportsNet, which would then become an FSN affiliate, while PRISM was replaced by Liberty's premium movie network Starz!.

Most of Fox Sports Networks' other programming was later carried in the Baltimore and Washington, D.C. markets on MASN2. Select games were also shown on Cox Communications local origination channels (later branded YurView), mostly in Rhode Island and Virginia. The Cox networks were exclusive to their cable systems.

=== Broadcast TV partners ===
At least two times in its history Fox Sports Net, partnered with broadcast TV stations to fill coverage gaps in markets where it did not have an affiliated regional sports network. Upon its launch, Fox Sports Net did not have an outlet in New York, the nation's largest media market (Cablevision's SportsChannel would not merge into Fox Sports until the following year). To overcome this obstacle, Fox Sports Net paid WBIS-TV $30 million to broadcast games and nightly news shows for the next five years. WBIS-TV itself was a new station that launched on July 1, 1996, when Dow Jones & Company and ITT Corporation purchased it from the City of New York. The Fox Sports programming complimented its "S+" format which combined sports programming and business news.

From September 2012 to September 2013, Fox syndicated select college football and basketball games produced by the Fox Sports regional networks to broadcast television stations in some of the markets where the aforementioned Comcast SportsNet had dropped coverage. These stations included WLVI (Boston), KICU-TV (San Francisco), WMCN-TV (Philadelphia) and WDCA (Washington, D.C.).

=== Fox College Sports (FCS) ===
Fox Sports Networks also operated Fox College Sports (FCS), a slate of three digital cable channels (Fox College Sports Atlantic, Fox College Sports Central and Fox College Sports Pacific) featuring programming divided by region (primarily collegiate and high school sports, as well as minor league sports events) from each individual FSN network; the FCS networks also carry each affiliate's regional sports news programs and non-news-and-event programming (such as coaches shows, team magazines and documentaries). The three networks were, more or less, condensed versions of the 22 FSN-affiliated networks (including Comcast SportsNet Mid-Atlantic), though the channels also showed international events that did not fit within the programming inventories of FSN or Fox Soccer Plus (and prior to 2013, the latter's now-defunct parent Fox Soccer), such as the Commonwealth Games, World University Games and the FINA World Swimming Championships.

The three FCS channels offered FSN feeds from the following channels, including live Big 12 Conference football, Pac-12 Conference football and basketball and Atlantic Coast Conference basketball games. The channels also rebroadcast shows originally produced by and shown on the following listed networks:

- FCS Atlantic: Fox Sports South, Fox Sports Carolinas, Fox Sports Tennessee, Fox Sports Southeast, Fox Sports Florida, Fox Sports Sun, MSG Plus and AT&T SportsNet Pittsburgh;
- FCS Central: Fox Sports Detroit, Fox Sports Southwest, Fox Sports Oklahoma, Fox Sports North, Fox Sports Wisconsin, Fox Sports Midwest, Fox Sports Kansas City, Fox Sports Indiana and Fox Sports Ohio;
- FCS Pacific: Fox Sports Arizona, Fox Sports West/Prime Ticket, AT&T SportsNet Rocky Mountain and Root Sports Northwest.

Fox College Sports also broadcast high school and Independent Women's Football League games, and college magazine and coach's shows. Fox College Sports formerly partnered with Big Ten Network to provide programming.

== High definition ==
All of the Fox Sports Networks regional affiliates maintained high-definition simulcast feeds presented in 720p (the default resolution format for 21st Century Fox's broadcast and pay television properties). All sports programming broadcast on each of the networks (including most team-related analysis and discussion programs, and non-event amateur sports programs) was broadcast in a format optimized for 16:9 widescreen displays, with graphics framed within a widescreen safe area rather than the 4:3 safe area, intended to be shown in a letterboxed format for standard definition viewers.

== National programs ==
=== Programming strategy ===
The programming strategy adopted by most of the Fox Sports Networks was to acquire the play-by-play broadcast rights to major sports teams in their regional market. This did not include NFL games, since the league's contracts require all games to be aired on broadcast television in each participating team's local markets. Therefore, FSN focused on other major professional leagues, like the MLB, NHL, NBA and WNBA.

In addition to local play-by-play coverage, the FSN networks also broadcast and produced pre-game shows, post-game shows and weekly "magazine" shows centered on the teams that maintained rights with the individual network. In some markets, FSN competed directly with other regional sports networks for the broadcast rights to team-specific programming. FSN networks also purchased shows or broker time slots for sports and outdoors programming from outside producers in their region to fill out their schedule further, with Fox Sports purchasing additional programming for national airing. Finally, low-trafficked late night and early morning timeslots were programmed locally with paid programming.

Also, FSN competed directly with ESPN in acquiring the conference rights to various collegiate sports events. One notable agreement was that with the Pac-12 Conference, in which packages of football and men's basketball regular season games were broadcast across all FSN networks within the regions served by each Pac-12 member university. Fox Sports Networks broadcast the majority of the Pac-12 Conference men's basketball tournament, except the tournament final, as well as a few Pac-12 matches from other conference-sanctioned sports (such as baseball and volleyball).

Besides play-by-play game rights, FSN provided a common set of programming that was available to all its regional sports networks, most notably The Dan Patrick Show, The Best Damn Sports Show Period and Final Score (TBDSSP and Final Score eventually ceased production, while The Dan Patrick Show later moved to the NBC Sports Network). Until August 2012, in some of regions served by that RSN, member channels of the competing Comcast SportsNet (as mentioned above) carried FSN programming through broadcast agreements with Fox Sports.

Fox Sports Networks' national sports telecasts were formerly marketed under the "FSN" brand; these national programs began to use more generic branding with fewer references to FSN or Fox in 2008, as a result of a number of Fox Sports Net affiliates being rebranded or realigned with other RSN chains (including FSN New England and FSN Bay Area, which both became part of Comcast SportsNet; FSN New York's relaunch as MSG Plus, the sister to MSG Network; and the eventual relaunch of several FSN affiliates acquired by DirecTV Sports Networks under the Root Sports brand); however, these networks later reverted to utilizing Fox branding on their FSN-syndicated broadcasts.

=== National prime time programming ===
In addition to regional programming, the Fox Sports Networks carried some prime time programming distributed to all of the regional networks (including past and present series such as The Best Damn Sports Show Period and Chris Myers Interviews). FSN tried to compete with ESPN in regards to original programming, most notably with the National Sports Report, a daily sports news program designed to compete with ESPN's SportsCenter, which debuted on FSN in 1996. Originally a two-hour program known as Fox Sports News, the running time of National Sports Report was steadily cut back (eventually dwindling to 30 minutes) as its ratings declined and the cost of producing the program increased. FSN hired popular former SportsCenter anchor Keith Olbermann and used him to promote the show heavily; ratings continued to slide (especially as Best Damn Sports Show Period's popularity increased), however, leading Fox Sports to cancel the National Sports Report, which aired its last edition in February 2002.

In some markets, FSN aired the Regional Sports Report (whose headline title was usually customized with the name of the region in which the particular program was broadcast, such as the Midwest Sports Report or Detroit Sports Report), a companion news program focusing primarily on regional sports as well as highlights and news on other sports teams that debuted in 2000 to complement the National Sports Report; many of the regional reports were cancelled in 2002 due to increasing costs of producing the individual programs.

Most of the national studio programming seen on FSN originated from the Fox Television Center in Hollywood, California; in 1998, operations moved to the new Fox Network Center, located on the 20th Century Fox backlot in Century City. Some programming was instead produced from the FSN headquarters in the Westwood district.

=== Live national play-by-play ===
- ACC football, and men's and women's college basketball (2001–2021)
- Big 12 college football and women's college basketball (1996–2020)
- Big East men's college basketball (2013–2020)
- Conference USA college football, and men's and women's college basketball (2011–2016, 2020–21)
- Pac-12 college football, and men's and women's college basketball (1996–2013)
- Thursday Night Baseball (1997–2000)
- UEFA Champions League soccer (selected Tuesday and Wednesday matches)
- UEFA Europa League soccer
- Formula One (1998–2000)
- NASCAR on Fox (2001–2002)
- Pep Boys Indy Racing League (1999)

=== Other sports ===
- Association of Volleyball Professionals (pro beach volleyball)
- French Open, Indian Wells Masters and Miami Masters (tennis)
- Campbell's Hall of Fame Tennis Classic
- Invesco Series QQQ tennis tour
- Red Bull Air Race
- International Fight League (2006–2008)
- Pride Fighting Championships
- World Poker Tour

=== Former programming ===
- 2Xtreem Motorcycle TV (2008) – a renovation series focusing on motorcycle customizing, hosted by four-person team of current and former AMA licensed racers and mechanics. The show remains in production and was offered to FSN and its other networks in a brokered programming arrangement.
- 54321 (November 2002 – November 2003) – a short-lived action sports news and variety program hosted by Leeann Tweeden, Chad Towersey, Kip Williamson and Jason "Wee-Man" Acuña.
- Amazing Sports Stories (2007–2011) a weekly half-hour re-enactment series illustrating various sports-related human interest stories (among those recounted included those on Bert Shepard's only game as a major-league pitcher, in which he made history as the first Major League Baseball player to play wearing a prosthetic device (it replaced one of his legs); Jackie Mitchell, a female pitcher who struck out Babe Ruth and Lou Gehrig in an exhibition game; Lawrence Lemieux, a Canadian Olympic yachtsman who sacrificed his chance at a medal to save the life of two fellow competitors from Singapore; and Ben Malcolmson, a writer for the University of Southern California newspaper The Daily Trojan who walked onto the USC Trojans football team).
- Baseball's Golden Age (July 6 – September 28, 2008) – a 13-episode documentary series profiling the history of baseball from the 1920s to the 1960s, illustrated partly using archived film footage.
- BCS Breakdown (September 2006 – 2011) – a preview of the week's top college football games, with analysis on their potential influence on the Bowl Championship Series standings; the program was hosted by Tom Helmer, with Gary Barnett and Petros Papadakis as analysts. The program was created through Fox Sports' acquisition of the television rights to the Bowl Championship Series (with the exception of the Rose Bowl Game) that ran until the 2011 series.
- The Best Damn Sports Show Period (July 23, 2001 – June 30, 2009) – a late-night panel discussion program featuring analysis of sports headlines and interviews.
- Beyond the Glory (January 7, 2001 – January 1, 2006) – a biographical program focusing on events and notable athletes in sports.
- Boys in the Hall (2011–2012) a documentary series, narrated by Tom Brokaw, chronicling notable baseball players.
- Breaking Par (2016–2021) a monthly half-hour series that looks at the game of golf through a different lens.
- The Chris Myers Interview (2008–2011) – an interview program featuring one-on-one discussions with sports figures, hosted by Chris Myers.
- The Dan Patrick Show (October 25, 2010 – October 17, 2012) – a simulcast of the sports talk radio program hosted by Dan Patrick; the program moved to NBC Sports Network (now NBCSN), Root Sports and the Audience Network in 2012.
- Destination Polaris (2013–2021) A weekly magazine show focusing on all-terrain vehicles made by Polaris Industries, their owners, and what people do with their ATVs. Sponsored by Polaris and runs on the network via a brokered-time agreement.
- FSN Across America (2003–2004) – a newsmagazine program featuring in-depth stories and interviews. Original co-host Carolyn Hughes was released by FSN citing a violation of a morals clause in Hughes's contract following the discovery of her affair with Los Angeles Dodgers pitcher Derek Lowe in 2004; the show was cancelled shortly afterward.
- The FSN Baseball Report (2006–2008) – a daily baseball analysis program aired during the Major League Baseball season.
- FSN Final Score (2006–2011) – a half-hour national sports news program (later retitled as simply Final Score on April 23, 2008) strictly focusing on game highlights that ran from July 3, 2006, to 2011; the program was originally anchored by FSN veterans Van Earl Wright, Barry LeBrock and Andrew Siciliano, later joined by newcomers Greg Wolf and Danyelle Sargent.
- FSN Pro Football Preview (2005–2010) – a weekly analysis program featuring previews of the week's upcoming National Football League games.
- Goin' Deep (2000–2001) – an hour-long newsmagazine series focusing on contentious issues in sports; the program was originally hosted by Joe Buck and later by Chris Myers.
- I, Max (May 10, 2004 – February 18, 2005) – a talk show hosted by Max Kellerman; the program was cancelled due to multiple factors, including Kellerman taking time away from the sports television industry after his brother's murder and creative differences regarding the show's future direction.
- In Focus on FSN (2006–2009) a half-hour series, hosted by Dick Enberg, taking a look at the impact of a particular sports event, mostly told through still photography.
- The Last Word (March 1998 – May 2002) – a nightly sports analysis and discussion program originally hosted by Wallace Matthews (in New York City) and Jim Rome (in Los Angeles), the latter of whom later took over as the program's sole host.
- Million Dollar Challenge (2000) – a game show where six contestants compete in sports-related physical challenges for a chance to win up to $1 million.
- Mind, Body & Kickin' Moves (2007–2009) – a re-edited version of the British martial arts show Mind, Body & Kick Ass Moves.
- NASCAR This Morning (2001–2004) – a morning program featuring analysis and news around the NASCAR circuit.
- The Next Great Champ (2004, Episodes 5–10) – A reality television series where 12 fighters battled for a professional contract with Oscar De La Hoya's Golden Boy Promotions and a cash prize. The Fox television network cancelled the show after 4 episodes, and the final six aired on FSN. Otis Griffin was the winner of the competition.
- NFL This Morning/The NFL Show (2001–2002) – An NFL pregame show with a mix of football talk and comedy, hosted by Chris Myers, along with Marv Levy, Deacon Jones, Billy Ray Smith and Jay Mohr. Mohr, Smith, Jones and Levy were replaced with Tony Siragusa, Michael Irvin, and comedian Tommy Davidson for season 2.
- The Official BCS Ratings Show (October 15, 2006 – 2011) – The weekly program announcing the current Bowl Championship Series standings (equivalent to ESPN's current College Football Playoff standings show); the program was hosted by Tom Helmer, with Gary Barnett and Petros Papadakis as analysts. The program aired on FSN as a result of Fox Sports' acquisition of the television rights to the Bowl Championship Series (with the exception of the Rose Bowl Game that ran until the 2011 series.
- Shaun Alexander Live (2001) – a short-lived variety show that ran for several months in 2001; the program poked fun of host Shaun Alexander's lack of recognition despite his accomplishments.
- Toughest Cowboy (2007–2008) – a series of weekly competitions in which rodeo cowboys attempted to ride in bareback, saddle bronc and bull riding. Each of those three disciplines was a round in the event, and this show toured arenas throughout the United States.
- Ring of Honor Wrestling (2019–2021) – a professional wrestling program featuring matches from the Ring of Honor promotion. The program has since moved to the Honor Club streaming service after being bought by Tony Khan.
- Sports Geniuses (March–June 2000) – a sports trivia game show, hosted by Matt Vasgersian.
- The Sports List (August 1 – September 7, 2004) – a daily sports news program featuring a countdown of ten stories based on sports topic, hosted by Summer Sanders.
- Sport Science (September 9, 2007 – October 20, 2009) – a weekly program explaining various athletic skills and techniques through scientific methods, many of which analyzed for the program in a performance laboratory at an airport hangar set up by FSN. The concept then moved to ESPN, where Sports Science is a regular SportsCenter segment with some 'best-of' compilation programs.
- TNA iMPACT! (June 4, 2004 – May 27, 2005) – a professional wrestling program featuring matches from the Total Nonstop Action Wrestling promotion; the program has since moved to several different networks, and the promotion rebranded as Impact Wrestling in 2017, but then reverted to their original name in 2024.
- Totally Football (2000–2001) – a weekly football analysis program.
- Totally NASCAR (2001–2004 and 2010) – a daily program featuring news around the NASCAR circuit, interviews and race highlights (including those not permitted for carriage by the similarly formatted ESPN2 program RPM 2Night). Many FSN affiliates carried Around the Track, a similarly formatted version of the program.
- The Ultimate Fan League (1998–1999) – a sports trivia game show, hosted by Bil Dwyer.
- You Gotta See This (1998–2007) – a video compilation series featuring unusual and amazing highlights from the world of sports.

In addition, FSN aired an extensive lineup of poker shows, including Poker Superstars Invitational Tournament and MansionPoker.net PokerDome Challenge. The World Poker Tour began broadcasting on FSN with its seventh season. It recently concluded airing its 15th season.

== Teams by network ==
Network	NBA	MLB	NHL	Other
Fox Sports Arizona	Phoenix Suns	Arizona Diamondbacks	Arizona Coyotes	Phoenix Mercury (WNBA)
Fox Sports Carolinas / Fox Sports Southeast	Charlotte Hornets	–	Carolina Hurricanes	–
Fox Sports Detroit	Detroit Pistons	Detroit Tigers	Detroit Red Wings	–
Fox Sports Florida	Orlando Magic	Miami Marlins	Florida Panthers	–
Fox Sports Indiana	Indiana Pacers	–	–	Indiana Fever (WNBA)
Fox Sports Kansas City	–	Kansas City Royals	–	Sporting Kansas City (MLS)
Fox Sports Midwest	–	St. Louis Cardinals	St. Louis Blues	–
Fox Sports New Orleans	New Orleans Pelicans	–	–	–
Fox Sports North	Minnesota Timberwolves	Minnesota Twins	Minnesota Wild	Minnesota Lynx (WNBA); Minnesota United FC (MLS)
Fox Sports Ohio	Cleveland Cavaliers	Cincinnati Reds	Columbus Blue Jackets	Columbus Crew SC (MLS)
Fox Sports Oklahoma	Oklahoma City Thunder	–	–	–
Fox Sports San Diego	–	San Diego Padres	–	–
Fox Sports South / Fox Sports Southeast	Atlanta Hawks	Atlanta Braves	–	Atlanta Dream (WNBA); Atlanta United FC (MLS)
Fox Sports Southwest	Dallas Mavericks; San Antonio Spurs	Texas Rangers	Dallas Stars	–
Fox Sports Sun	Miami Heat	Tampa Bay Rays	Tampa Bay Lightning	–
Fox Sports Tennessee / Fox Sports Southeast	Memphis Grizzlies	–	Nashville Predators	–
Fox Sports West	–	Los Angeles Angels	Los Angeles Kings	–
Fox Sports Wisconsin	Milwaukee Bucks	Milwaukee Brewers	Minnesota Wild	Minnesota United FC (MLS)
Prime Ticket	Los Angeles Clippers	–	Anaheim Ducks	–
SportsTime Ohio	–	Cleveland Indians	–	–
YES Network	Brooklyn Nets	New York Yankees	–	New York City FC (MLS)

== Pay-per-view ==
FSN distributed its first pay-per-view event on November 10, 2006, a boxing match in which former heavyweight champion Evander Holyfield defeated Fres Oquendo in a unanimous decision at the Alamodome in San Antonio, Texas. The fight was also streamed free of charge on the FoxSports.com website outside the United States.

FSN also provided pay-per-view coverage of select college football games. These were usually early-season games, and would feature either a Big 12 or SEC team against a lesser-known opponent. The pay-per-view coverage of SEC games ended upon the launch of the SEC Network in 2014, and most Big 12 schools phased out pay-per-view telecasts around this time as well. Oklahoma was the last school to feature select games on pay-per-view, doing so through 2021.

== Americans in Focus ==
In February 2008, FSN launched a public service initiative called "Americans in Focus", with the sponsorship support of Farmers Insurance. This initiative consists of one-minute vignettes profiling non-white persons, with segments airing on the FSN networks in February 2008 and 2009 during Black History Month, from September 15 to October 15, 2008, for Hispanic Heritage Month and in March 2009 for Asian Pacific American Heritage Month. The Americans in Focus vignettes and the companion sub-site on the Fox Sports website were discontinued in April 2009.

== See also ==
- Fox Corporation
  - Fox Broadcasting Company
  - Fox Sports
    - Fox Sports 1
    - Fox Sports 2
    - FoxSports.com
    - Fox Deportes
    - Fox Soccer Plus
    - Fox Sports Racing
- Broadcasting of sports events
- Regional sports network
- NBC Sports Regional Networks
