= Sports broadcasting contracts in the United States =

In the United States, sports are televised on various broadcast networks, national and specialty sports cable channels, and regional sports networks. American sports rights are estimated to be worth a total of $22.42 billion in 2019, about 44% of the total worldwide sports media market. American networks are willing to pay a significant amount of money for television sports contracts because it attracts large amounts of viewership; live sport broadcasts accounted for 44 of the 50 list of most watched television broadcasts in the United States in 2016.

Among these television contracts, NBC holds a $7.75 billion contract, signed in 2014, to air the Olympic Games through the 2032 games, making it a major source of revenue for the International Olympic Committee. The broadcast deals of the National Collegiate Athletic Association (NCAA), running through 2032 (and including its most significant property, the NCAA Division I men's basketball tournament — colloquially known as "March Madness"), were worth $8.8 billion in 2018.

The U.S. is home to four of the top five professional sports leagues by revenue in the world: Major League Baseball (MLB), National Basketball Association (NBA), National Football League (NFL), and National Hockey League (NHL). The NFL has the largest television contracts, and earns about $11 billion annually from its contracts with Fox, CBS, NBC and ESPN for the 2023 through 2033 seasons. MLB earns $1.5 billion annually from its contracts signed in 2012 with ESPN, Fox, and Turner Sports (TBS) for the 2014 through 2021 seasons. In 2014, the NBA signed a nine-year television deal with ABC/ESPN and TNT that generates annual league television revenues of $2.66 billion beginning with the 2016–17 season, while the NHL earns $625 million annually from seven-year contracts signed in 2021 with ESPN and Turner Sports to last until the 2027–28 season.

== American football ==
=== National Football League ===
Since the 1960s, all regular season and playoff games broadcast in the United States have been aired by national television networks. Until the broadcast contract ended in 2013, the terrestrial television networks CBS, NBC, and Fox, as well as cable television's ESPN, paid a combined total of US$20.4 billion to broadcast NFL games. From 2014 to 2022, the same networks paid $39.6 billion for exactly the same broadcast rights. This increased to about $110 billion to air games from 2023 to 2033. The NFL thus holds broadcast contracts with four companies (Paramount Skydance, Comcast, Fox Corporation, and ESPN Inc.—which is majority owned by The Walt Disney Company, respectively) that control a combined media cross-ownership in the United States. League-owned NFL Network, on cable television, also broadcasts a selected number of games nationally. In 2017, the NFL games attracted the top three rates for a 30-second advertisement: $699,602 for NBC Sunday Night Football, $550,709 for Thursday Night Football (NBC), and $549,791 for Thursday Night Football (CBS).

For the 2020 NFL season, two extra wild card playoff games were added to the schedule; CBS and NBC acquired rights to these new games, with both paying roughly $70 million each.

==== Television ====
Package	Rightsholder	Extent of coverage	Current contract term
AFC	CBS	AFC Sunday regional coverage; One Thanksgiving Day game; A late-season Saturday game in 2026; One wild card game. (Two in 2024, 2029, and 2033 seasons); One divisional playoff game; AFC Championship Game; Part of Super Bowl rights rotation.	2023–2033
NFC	Fox	NFC Sunday regional coverage; One Thanksgiving Day game; 1 European game and a late-season Saturday game in 2026; At least one wild card game (two in select years); One divisional playoff game; NFC Championship Game; Part of Super Bowl rights rotation	2023–2033
Sunday Night Football	NBC	Sunday primetime game during regular season; Kickoff Game; Thanksgiving Day game in primetime; One extra regular season game exclusively on Peacock from 2023–28; A late-season Saturday game in 2026; One wild card game (Two in 2026 and 2031 seasons, three in 2023 with one game exclusively on Peacock); One divisional playoff game; Part of Super Bowl rights rotation	2023–2033
Monday Night Football/NFLN Games	ESPN/ABC	Monday primetime games during regular season; Season’s final week Saturday doubleheader simulcast on ABC; One wild card game simulcast on ABC; One divisional playoff game simulcast on ABC; Pro Bowl Games; Part of Super Bowl rights rotation shown on ABC/ESPN; Full, three-day draft coverage; Option to air games with supplemental feeds on other ESPN/Disney networks.	2023–2033
Monday Night Football/NFLN Games	NFL Network	5 European games; 2 late-season Saturday games; Full, three-day draft coverage	2022–2033

==== Digital and out-of-market ====
Package	Rightsholder	Extent of coverage	Current contract term
Thursday Night Football	Prime Video; Twitch	15 games on Thursday nights (excluding the Kickoff Game and Thanksgiving, which are part of the SNF package); Black Friday Game; One wild card game	2022–2033
NFL on Netflix	Netflix	A week 1 game; Thanksgiving Eve game; 1 or 2 games on Christmas day; A week 18 Saturday game	2024–2029
NFL Sunday Ticket	YouTube TV	Out-of-market Sunday regional games	2023–2029
NFL+		Streaming of in-market and national games on over-the-top subscription; merger of NFL Game Pass and previous streaming via Yahoo Sports.	2022–????

==== Radio ====
Westwood One has exclusive national radio rights through an unspecified multi-year period starting in the 2022 season. As of 2022, Westwood One airs coverage of nationally telecast primetime games, as well as all playoff games and other NFL events.

Compass Media Networks, ESPN Radio, and the Sports USA Radio Network have national radio rights to regular season Sunday afternoon games sublicensed from Dial Global.

Each NFL team has local television stations with rights to preseason games and radio stations with rights to all games.

Sirius XM has exclusive satellite radio rights to home, away, and, if available, national broadcast radio feeds of all games. It also has rights to online streaming of games for its subscribers starting with the 2011 season.

=== College football ===
College football coverage is dependent on negotiations between the broadcaster and the college football conference or team. The televised games may change from year-to-year depending on which teams are having a strong season, although some traditional college rivalry games are broadcast each year. Some games are traditionally associated with a specific event or holiday, and viewing the game itself can become a holiday tradition for fans.

Post-season bowl games, including the College Football Playoff, are presently all televised, most of them by the ESPN networks. The television broadcast rights to all six CFP bowls and the National Championship are owned by ESPN through at least the 2025 season. In November 2012, ESPN reached a 12-year deal to broadcast the remaining three bowls, the championship game, as well as shoulder programming such as ranking shows; as a whole, the contract is valued at around $470 million per year, or nearly $5.7 billion for the life of the contract.

Regular-season

Conference/Team	Rightsholder	Extent of coverage	Current contract term
American Conference	ABC/ESPN	At least 40 games on ABC, ESPN, ESPN2 and ESPNU (additional games on ESPN+); At least 20 games from above on ABC, ESPN2 and ESPNU; All Navy home games vs. Notre Dame, plus one additional game; Championship Game on ABC	2020–2031
American Conference	CBS	Most Navy home games, including all against Air Force	2018–2027
American Conference	CBS	All Army home games	2023–2028
American Conference	CBS	Army–Navy Game	2024–2038
Atlantic Coast Conference	ABC/ESPN	Exclusive rights to all games; At least 40 games on ABC, ESPN, ESPN2 and ESPNU; 40 games on ACC Network; Championship Game on ABC	2019–2035
Atlantic Coast Conference	CW (via Raycom Sports)	13 games	2023–2026
Big 12 Conference	ABC/ESPN	Most games, including Championship Game	2025–2030
Big 12 Conference	Fox Sports	35 games	2025–2030
Big 12 Conference	TNT Sports (via ESPN)	13 games	2025–2030
Big Ten Conference	Fox Sports	30–32 games on Fox and FS1; Championship Game in 2023, 2025–2027 and 2029	2023–2029
Big Ten Conference	CBS	14–15 games on CBS, including one on Black Friday; Championship Game in 2024 and 2028	2023–2029
Big Ten Conference	NBC	14–15 games on NBC; 8 games on Peacock	2023–2029
Big Ten Conference	Big Ten Network	Maximum of 50 games	2023–2029
Conference USA	CBS	18 games on CBS Sports Network; Championship Game on CBS Sports Network	2023–2027
Conference USA	ESPN	8 midweek October games on ESPN, ESPN2 or ESPNU; Remaining games on ESPN3 and/or ESPN+	2023–2027
Mid-American Conference	ESPN	All games, including Championship Game	2014–2026
Mid-American Conference	CBS (via ESPN)	10 games on CBSSN	
Mountain West Conference	CBS	15 games on CBS Sports Network (1 game on CBS)	2026–2031
Mountain West Conference	Fox Sports	12 games on Fox, FS1 or FS2; Championship Game on Fox	2026–2031
Mountain West Conference	CW	13 games on The CW	2026–2030
Mountain West Conference	MW+	21 games	2026–
Pac-12 Conference
Pac-12 Conference	CBS	15 games on CBS or CBS Sports Network (3 games on CBS and 12 games on CBSSN); Championship Game on CBS.	2026–2030
Pac-12 Conference	CW	13 games on The CW	2026–2030
Pac-12 Conference	USA Network	22 games	2026–2030
Southeastern Conference	ABC/ESPN	Exclusive rights to all games; At least 1 game weekly on ABC; Championship Game on ABC; Up to 14 games on ESPN+	2024–2033
Sun Belt Conference	ESPN	Exclusive rights to all games; At least 15 games on ABC, ESPN, ESPN2 or ESPNU; Championship Game on ABC or ESPN	2020–2030
Notre Dame	NBC	All home games; Select games on Peacock	2024–2029
UConn	CBS Sports Network	Most home games	2020–2027

Postseason

- All bowl games, including most College Football Playoff games, and the College Football Playoff National Championship, air on ESPN networks unless otherwise noted.
- ABC: Two College Football Playoff first-round games (2024–present; simulcast with ESPN); one quarterfinal game, one semifinal game, and College Football Playoff National Championship (2027–present; simulcast with ESPN)
- CBS: Sun Bowl (1968–present)
- Fox: Holiday Bowl (2017, 2022–2025)
- TNT: Two College Football Playoff first-round games (2024–2025; sublicensed from ESPN); two first-round games, two quarterfinal games, and one semifinal game (2026–present; sublicensed from ESPN)
- The CW: Arizona Bowl (2023–present); Poinsettia Bowl (2026–present); Holiday Bowl (2026–present)
- NCAA Division I (FCS) Football Championship: ESPN networks (television), WestwoodOne (radio)
- NCAA Division II Football Championship game: ESPN2
- NCAA Division III Football Championship game: ESPNU

Radio

- IMG College: Notre Dame Fighting Irish football (national rights), regional rights to numerous other teams as well as Big East and Southeastern Conference games of the week
- JMI Sports: regional rights to University of Kentucky sports, including Kentucky Wildcats football, from 2015 to 2030
- Learfield Sports: regional rights to numerous teams
- Nevada Sports Network: 3 bowl games a year
- Sports USA Radio Network, Westwood One, Compass Media Networks, ESPN Radio, and Touchdown Radio Productions/United Stations Radio Networks: national games

=== CFL ===
Since 2023, CBS Sports Network holds the television rights to 34 games from the CFL. All games are produced by TSN. Games not picked up by CBSSN, including the Grey Cup, air for free on CFL+.

SiriusXM Canada's radio broadcasts of the CFL are available in the United States.

=== United Football League (UFL) ===
As part of the merger between the XFL (broadcast rights owned by ESPN/ABC) and USFL (broadcast rights owned by Fox Sports), both media partners maintained media agreements with the new United Football League. NBC Sports, who had shared media rights with Fox for the USFL, dropped their involvement due to schedule conflicts.

In 2026, ABC/ESPN aired 22 games across ABC, ESPN, ESPN2, ESPN app, and NFL Network, with the remaining games on Fox, FS1 and FS2.

=== Other professional football leagues ===
- National Arena League: Scripps Sports Network
- Indoor Football League: Yahoo Sports Network and Overnght
- Arena Football One: Vice TV and HomeTeam Network
- A7FL: DAZN and Creator Sports Network
- Women's National Football Conference: Victory+
- European Football Alliance: Fubo Sports Network

== Baseball ==
=== Major League Baseball ===
==== National television ====
On August 28, 2012, it was announced that ESPN and Major League Baseball had agreed on a new eight-year deal that greatly increases the network's studio and game content across all of its platforms. Also it increased ESPN's average yearly payment from about $360 million to approximately $700 million. ESPN also returned to broadcasting postseason baseball beginning in 2014 with one of two wild-card games each season. The network alternates airing the American League and National League wild-card games each year. It also has the rights to all potential regular-season tiebreaker games starting in 2014.

On September 19, 2012, Sports Business Daily reported that Major League Baseball would agree to separate eight-year television deals with Fox Sports and Turner Sports through the 2021 season. Fox would reportedly pay around $4 billion over eight years (close to $500 million per year) while Turner would pay around $2.8 billion over eight years (more than $300 million per year). Under the new deals, Fox and TBS's coverage would essentially be the same as in the 2007–2013 contract with the exception of Fox and TBS splitting coverage of the Division Series, which TBS has broadcast exclusively dating back to 2007. More importantly, Fox would carry some of the games (such as the Saturday afternoon Game of the Week) on its all-sports channel, Fox Sports 1. Sources also said that was possible that Fox would sell some Division Series games to MLB Network, which did end up occurring.

On November 15, 2018, Fox renewed its rights, set to end in 2022, through 2028. The contract maintains Fox's current coverage structure, but with expanded digital rights, and the commitment to air more games on the Fox broadcast network when the new deal takes effect. Fox also committed to airing at least two of its League Championship Series games, as well as any Game 7, on the broadcast network beginning in 2019; it had been criticized for airing only Game 2 of the 2018 National League Championship Series, while placing the rest on Fox Sports 1.

On September 24, 2020, TBS also renewed its rights from 2022 through 2028, under which it will replace its late-season Sunday afternoon games with a season-long package of primetime games on Tuesday nights, and maintain its existing arrangements for playoff coverage. The contract also adds expanded digital rights for Bleacher Report and "additional WarnerMedia platforms". ESPN would in turn renew its rights to MLB on May 13, 2021, for the 2022 to 2028 seasons; the deal ends ESPN's coverage of weeknight games, but retains its exclusive Sunday night window and playoff telecasts. On March 8, 2022, Apple Inc. signed a seven-year deal with MLB for the broadcast for US$85 million per year, a total value of $595 million. This includes an annual $55 million rights fee as well as $30 million for Apple advertising. Apple has the right to exit the agreement after the first or second year. On April 9, 2022, NBC Sports announced an agreement with MLB for a package of new Sunday afternoon games starting from 2022 season; those matches are broadcast exclusively on Peacock.

On February 20, 2025, ESPN and Major League Baseball announced that they have agreed to part ways following the 2025 season.

On November 19, 2025, Major League Baseball announced new 3-year rights deals with ESPN, NBC and Netflix.

Rightsholder	Extent of coverage
Fox	26 Saturday prime time regionalized games on Fox; 40 games on FS1; All-Star Game; Two Division Series and League Championship Series (American League in odd-numbered years, National League in even-numbered years); World Series
TNT Sports	26 Tuesday night games on TBS; Two Division Series and League Championship Series (American League in even-numbered years, National League in odd-numbered years)
NBC	Opening Day doubleheader and Labor Day primetime game.; 25 Sunday Night Baseball games on NBC/NBCSN; 18 MLB Sunday Leadoff games on NBCSN (with selected games on NBC); Annual "roadblock" event (taking place on July 5 for the 2026 season) where all games will be available on NBC platforms.; Daily regular season out-of-market "game of the day" on Peacock.; All-Star Futures Game and coverage of the MLB draft.; All four Wild Card Series; Beginning in 2027, NBC will air a regular-season special event game, and the final game of the regular season.
ESPN/ABC	30 regular-season games; Select games airing on ABC; Rightsholder to MLB.tv on the ESPN app; 150 regular season out-of-market "game of the day" offerings on ESPN Unlimited; Memorial Day games; MLB Little League Classic
Apple TV	50 Friday Night Baseball regular-season games
Netflix	Opening Night prime time game; Home Run Derby; One regular season special-event game (such as MLB at Field of Dreams)
MLB Network	26 non-exclusive MLB Network Showcase games; Remaining coverage of the draft; Simulcasts of various regular season games with local broadcasters (not available in local markets)

===== National radio =====
- ESPN Radio: a Saturday game of the week, Sunday night, opening day and holiday games, plus the All-Star Game and the entire postseason.
- TUDN Radio: Spanish-language coverage of select regular season games, the Home Run Derby, the All-Star Game, and the postseason.

==== Local television and radio ====
- Additionally, local or regional broadcasters contract with the MLB team in their area for the right to broadcast a number of regular season games locally, primarily on regional sports networks. Games broadcast locally or regionally are available nationwide (except those affected by local blackout restrictions) on the subscription-based MLB.TV and MLB Extra Innings services.

===== Local radio =====
- MLB teams also contract with local broadcasters to air games on radio. Several teams have multiple affiliates covering those games. The flagship stations can air all games of the teams they contract with, other affiliates must allow ESPN radio coverage to air during the postseason.

=== Women's Pro Baseball League ===
- The league is planned to commence play in 2026. For the inaugural season, WPBL announced an agreement with ESPN to stream all games on ESPN Select. Eleven regular season games will also be simulcast on Scripps Sports Network. Fremantle will produce the league's broadcasts, shoulder programming, and documentaries on the league and its clubs.

=== Winter leagues ===
- Arizona Fall League: MLB Network and MLB.com
- Australian Baseball League: MLB.TV and Baseball+
- Caribbean Series: MLB Network (English) and ESPN Deportes (Spanish)
- Dominican Professional Baseball League: MLB.tv
- Mexican Pacific League: MLB.tv
- Liga de Béisbol Profesional Roberto Clemente: YouTube
- Venezuelan Professional Baseball League: BeisbolPlay

=== College Baseball ===
Postseason ESPN currently broadcasts the College World Series on its family of networks.

Regular-season Nationally televised regular-season games are contracted through each conference and appear on CBS Sports Network, ESPN/ESPN2/ESPNU, FS1, and FS2, along with several school- and conference-specific networks (Big Ten Network, SEC Network and ACC Network).

=== Little League Baseball ===
ESPN has rights to broadcast the entire Little League World Series, as well as the finals of the eight regional tournaments that determine the U.S. representatives in that competition. It distributes coverage among its family of networks and ABC; the final is aired on ABC.

=== Minor League Baseball ===
All Minor League Baseball games air for free via the Bally Sports Live streaming service. Select games, including the Triple-A National Championship Game, air on MLB Network.

=== Other professional baseball leagues ===
- Nippon Professional Baseball: For the Fans, Ryz Sports Network, ChimeTV
- KBO League: Soop
- American Association of Professional Baseball: Ryz Sports Network, Bally Live, For the Fans, Next Level Sports, Gray Broadcast Sports Networks, SLVR Sports and Entertainment, Unbeaten
- Atlantic League of Professional Baseball: HomeTeam Network
- Frontier League: HomeTeam Network
- Pioneer Baseball League: HomeTeam Network

=== Softball ===
- Athletes Unlimited Softball League: ESPN, MLB Network
- NCAA Division I softball tournament: ESPN

== Basketball ==
=== National Basketball Association ===
==== National television ====
On July 24, 2024, the NBA announced new 11-year agreements with ESPN/ABC, NBC Sports, and Amazon Prime Video that will last from the 2025–26 to 2035–36 seasons.

Rightsholder	Extent of coverage
ESPN/ABC	Approximately 20 regular-season games on ABC.; Consists primarily of prime time NBA Saturday and Sunday afternoon NBA Sunday Showcase games during the later half of the season.; Approximately 60 regular-season games on ESPN and the ESPN app.; Primarily on Wednesday nights, or other nights when the schedule permits (such as Friday nights, and an afternoon/evening doubleheader on the final Sunday of the regular season); Rights to the Christmas Day games (simulcast between ABC and ESPN); Rights to the All-Star Celebrity Game; Rights to Draft and draft lottery; Up to 18 games across the first two rounds of the playoffs, and one conference final in 10 of 11 seasons.; Exclusive coverage of the Finals on ABC, with alternate feeds available on the ESPN app.
NBC Sports	100 regular season games; NBA Monday on Peacock and NBCSN.; Coast 2 Coast Tuesdays on NBC and Peacock.; Sunday Night Basketball on NBC and Peacock following the conclusion of the NFL season.; Rights to the opening night and Martin Luther King Jr. Day games; Rights to the All-Star Weekend (outside of the All-Star Celebrity Game); Up to 28 games across the first two rounds of the playoffs, and one conference final in 6 of 11 seasons.; Rights to USA Basketball men's and women's national team games beginning in 2025
Prime Video	66 regular season games; Primarily on Friday nights, Thursday nights following the conclusion of the NFL regular season, and occasional Saturday games.; Exclusive rights to the NBA Cup knockout stage and final.; Exclusive rights to the Play-In Tournament, up to 28 games across the first two rounds of the playoffs, and one conference final in 6 of 11 seasons.
NBA TV	60 regular-season games. Simulcast from one team's local TV broadcaster. Blacked out within the markets of the participating teams

==== Local television ====
Additionally, local or regional broadcasters contract with the NBA team in their area for the right to broadcast a number of regular-season games locally. As of the 2025–26 season, all playoff games are exclusive national games, and there are no longer regional broadcasts during the first round.

==== National radio ====
- ESPN Radio: usually one game from the Sunday afternoon package, one game on Thursday night, and postseason coverage including all games in the Conference Finals and the NBA Finals.

==== Local radio ====
NBA teams also contract with local radio broadcasters to air their games. Teams may also have affiliates air their games.

=== Women's National Basketball Association ===
In 2013, the WNBA and ESPN signed a six-year extension on the broadcast deal to cover 2017–2022. In the new deal, a total of 30 games would be shown each season on ESPN networks. Each team would receive around $1 million per year. On April 22, 2019, CBS Sports Network reached a multi-year deal to televise 40 regular-season weekend and primetime WNBA games, beginning in the 2019 WNBA season. In July 2024, the WNBA, ESPN/ABC, NBC Sports, and Prime Video announced a new 11-season media deal that lasts until the end of the 2036 WNBA season.

Rightsholder	Extent of coverage
ESPN/ABC	Minimum 25 regular-season games, primarily airing on Sundays and Tuesday nights on ESPN, and Weekend afternoons on ABC.; Rights to All-Star Game; Rights to Draft and draft lottery; Two first-round playoff series annually; Rights to a semifinals series in eight of 11 seasons; Finals exclusively for five out of 11 seasons (odd-numbered years)
NBC Sports	22 regular-season games aired across NBC/NBCSN, primarily on Sundays and Mondays with select Saturdays.; One first-round playoff series annually (shared with USA Network); Rights to a semifinal series in 7 out of 11 seasons (shared with USA Network); Finals (shared with USA Network) in 2026, 2030, & 2034, with all games airing on Peacock
Prime Video	30 regular-season games, primarily on Thursdays; Rights to the Commissioner's Cup Final; One first-round playoff series annually; Rights to a semifinal series in 7 out of 11 seasons; Finals in 2028, 2032, & 2036.
USA Sports	50 regular-season games primarily on Mondays and Wednesdays on USA Network and/or CNBC.; One first-round playoff series annually (shared with NBC); Rights to a semifinal series in 7 out of 11 seasons (shared with NBC); Rights to Finals (shared with NBC) in 2026, 2030, & 2034.
CBS	20 regular-season games on CBS, primarily on weekends, and streaming on Paramount+.
Ion	50 regular-season games on Ion Television under the Friday Night Spotlight brand.
NBA TV	15 regular-season games

=== College basketball ===
==== Postseason ====
- NCAA Division I men's basketball tournament: From 2011 through 2032, all games are televised by either CBS Sports or through TNT Sports on cable network (TBS, TNT, and TruTV)
  - The First Four round is televised exclusively by TruTV.
  - Since 2016, Warner Bros. Discovery networks broadcast the Final Four and national championship games in even-numbered years, and CBS in odd-numbered years. During years in which the Final Four is televised by Warner Bros. Discovery, TBS carries the conventional telecast, with TNT and TruTV simulcasting TBS's feed starting in 2022. From 2014 to 2016, and again in 2018, TNT and truTV had carried special "Team Stream" telecasts with commentary and surrounding coverage focused on each of the participating teams.
- NIT and NIT Season Tip-Off: ESPN
- NCAA Division I women's basketball tournament: ESPN networks
- WBIT: ESPN
- NAIA Men's Basketball Championships: ESPN3

==== Regular season ====
Nationally televised regular-season games are contracted through each conference and air as follows:

- America East: ESPN networks
- American Conference: ESPN networks
- Atlantic 10: ESPN networks, CBS Sports Network, CBS (championship only), USA Network
- ACC: ESPN networks (including ACC Network), The CW
- ASUN: ESPN networks
- Big 12: ESPN networks, Fox/FS1, TNT Sports, CBS networks, Peacock
- Big East: Fox/FS1, NBC/Peacock, TNT Sports, ESPN+
- Big Sky Conference: ESPN networks, Scripps Sports
- Big South Conference: ESPN networks
- Big Ten: CBS/Paramount+, Fox/FS1, NBC/Peacock, Big Ten Network
- Big West: ESPN networks, Spectrum SportsNet
- Conference USA: ESPN Networks, CBS networks, CUSA.tv
- Colonial Athletic Association: CBS networks, FloHoops
- Horizon League: ESPN networks
- Ivy League: ESPN networks
- MAAC: ESPN networks
- Mid-American Conference: ESPN networks, CBS networks
- MEAC: ESPN networks
- Missouri Valley Conference: ESPN networks, CBS Sports Network, CBS (championship only), Gray Media
- Mountain West Conference: Fox networks, CBS Networks, The CW, MW+
- Northeast Conference: ESPN networks, NEC Front Row, SNY, CBS networks
- Ohio Valley Conference: ESPN networks
- Pac-12 Conference: CBS networks, The CW, USA Network
- Patriot League: CBS networks, ESPN (ESPN+)
- SEC: ESPN networks (including SEC Network and ABC)
- Southwestern Athletic Conference: ESPN networks, HBCU Go, TheGrio
- Southern Conference: ESPN networks, CBS networks, Nexstar Media Group
- Southland Conference: ESPN networks
- Summit League: CBS networks, MidcoSN
- Sun Belt Conference: ESPN networks
- United Athletic Conference: ESPN networks
- West Coast Conference: ESPN networks, CBS networks, WCC Network

=== FIBA ===
- FIBA Basketball World Cup: TNT Sports (including qualifiers)
- FIBA Under-19 Basketball World Cup (men and women): TNT Sports
- FIBA Intercontinental Cup: Facebook, YouTube, and Twitch
- FIBA 3x3 World Tour: FloSports
- EuroBasket (men and women): TNT Sports
- FIBA AmeriCup and FIBA Women's AmeriCup: TNT Sports
- AfroBasket (men and women): TNT Sports

=== Other leagues ===
- NBA Summer League: ESPN and Prime Video
- NBA G League: ESPN, Prime Video, NBA TV, The Roku Channel
- The Basketball Tournament: Fox Sports
- Big3: CBS, Vice TV
- Euroleague: Telemundo Deportes, EuroLeague TV
- EuroCup: EuroLeague TV
- Basketball Champions League: DAZN and Courtside 1891
- Basketball Champions League Americas: FanDuel TV
- ABA Basketball: ESPN3
- Premier Basketball League: ESPN3
- ACB: DAZN
- National Basketball League (Australia): NBA TV and EuroLeague TV
- National Basketball League (New Zealand): ESPN
- Basketball Bundesliga: EuroLeague TV
- Greek Basket League: EuroLeague TV
- Italian Serie A: Napoli Basketball TV

== Boxing ==
- Top Rank: TNT Sports and DAZN
- Premier Boxing Champions: TNT Sports(2026–present, selected non-PPV fights), Prime Video (2024–present, inc. the coverage on DAZN), DAZN (2026–present)
- Matchroom Boxing: DAZN
- Golden Boy Promotions: TNT Sports(2026–present, selected non-PPV fights) and DAZN
- MVPW: ESPN
- Dream Boxing: DAZN
- Boxxer: Triller TV (fights that not aired on televisions), NBC Sports (non-Top Rank fights), and ESPN+ (Top Rank fights only)
- Zuffa Boxing: Paramount+, CBS (possible selected events) (2026–2031)
- Bare Knuckle Fighting Championship: Triller TV

== Cricket ==
International competitions

- Cricket World Cup: Willow
- ICC Men's T20 World Cup: ESPN+, Willow
- Under-19 Cricket World Cup: ESPN+, Willow
- Australia national cricket team: Willow
- Bangladesh national cricket team: Willow
- England national cricket team: Willow
- India national cricket team: ESPN+ Hotstar
- Ireland cricket team: ESPN+
- New Zealand national cricket team: ESPN+
- West Indies cricket team: ESPN+
- Pakistan national cricket team: Willow
- South Africa national cricket team: Willow
- Sri Lanka national cricket team: Willow

National competitions

- Big Bash League: Willow
- Bangladesh Premier League: Willow
- Caribbean Premier League: Willow
- Pakistan Super League: Willow
- Indian Premier League: Willow, Hotstar
- Super Smash: ESPN+
- Regional Super50: ESPN+
- Major League Cricket: Willow TV, CBS Sports Network

== Curling ==
More than 300 hours of live curling, broadcast by TSN in Canada, will be live-streamed on ESPN3, including:

- Canada Cup
- TSN All-Star Curling Skins Game
- Continental Cup
- Canadian Junior Men's and Women's Championships
- Scotties Tournament of Hearts
- Tim Hortons Brier

== Cycling ==
Grand Tours

- Tour de France (until 2029): USA Network, Peacock, (NBC shows a weekly one-hour recap)
- Tour de France Femmes: Peacock
- Vuelta a España: Peacock
- Giro d'Italia: HBO Max

Other road cycling races

- Paris-Roubaix, Flèche Wallonne, Liège–Bastogne–Liège, Critérium du Dauphiné, Paris-Tours: Peacock
- Tirreno–Adriatico, Milan–San Remo, Strade Bianche, Tour of Britain, Volta a Catalunya: HBO Max
- Other RCS races: HBO Max
- Tour of Flanders and other Flanders Classics races: Flo Sports
- Amstel Gold Race: Flo Sports
- Tour de Suisse: Flo Sports
- UCI Road World Championships: Flo Sports

== Esports ==
- Blast Pro Series: Eleven Sports Network
- ELeague: TBS
- eNASCAR Coca-Cola iRacing Series: YouTube and Twitch
- League of Legends Championship Series: ESPN+
- Madden NFL: Twitch and YouTube
- Madden Bowl: Twitch and YouTube
- Overwatch League: YouTube

== Golf ==
=== Men's majors ===
Event	Rightsholder	Extent of coverage	Current contract term/notes
Masters Tournament	CBS (free-to-air)	Weekend round coverage	1956–present Augusta National Golf Club signs year-to-year contracts only, but has consistently chosen CBS as its broadcast partner annually.
Masters Tournament	Paramount+ (subscription streaming)	Weekend round coverage (simulcast of CBS' coverage)	2021–present
Masters Tournament	ESPN (subscription)	Early-round coverage. Spanish coverage on all four days on ESPN Deportes	ESPN replaced USA Network in 2008, who first added first- and second-round coverage on cable in 1982.
Masters Tournament	ESPN+ (subscription streaming)	Live streams of Featured Groups, Featured Holes and Amen Corner during live play on all four days	ESPN replaced USA Network in 2008, who first added first- and second-round coverage on cable in 1982.
Masters Tournament	Prime Video (subscription streaming)	Thursday–Friday coverage from 1 to 3 p.m. EDT	2026–???.
PGA Championship	CBS (free-to-air)	Weekend round coverage	2020–2030, aired since 1991.
PGA Championship	ESPN (subscription)	Early-round coverage; Weekend morning coverage	2020–2030. ESPN succeeded TNT as cable rightsholder.
PGA Championship	ESPN+ (subscription streaming)	Exclusive Featured Groups and Featured Holes coverage over all four days; Exclusive traditional coverage until switching to television windows	2020–2030. ESPN succeeded TNT as cable rightsholder.
U.S. Open	NBC (free-to-air)	Late-afternoon/Primetime early rounds coverage Weekend round coverage	2020–2026; contract includes all USGA national championships.
U.S. Open	Peacock (streaming)	Supplemental coverage	2020–2026; contract includes all USGA national championships.
U.S. Open	USA Network (subscription)	Early-round coverage	2020–2026; contract includes all USGA national championships.
The Open Championship	NBC (free-to-air)	Weekend round coverage	2016–2028 (first year sub-licensed from former rightsholder ESPN)
The Open Championship	USA Network (subscription)	Early-round coverage	2022–2028

=== Women's majors ===
Event	Rightsholder	Extent of coverage	Current contract term/notes
ANA Inspiration	Golf Channel (subscription)	Full coverage	Part of LPGA broadcast rights.
Women's PGA Championship	NBC (free-to-air)	Weekend round coverage	
Women's PGA Championship	Golf Channel (subscription)	Early-round coverage	
U.S. Women's Open	NBC (free-to-air)	Late-afternoon/primetime coverage of early rounds, weekend round coverage	2020–2026; contract includes all United States Golf Association national championships.
U.S. Women's Open	USA Network (subscription)	Early-round coverage	2020–2026; contract includes all United States Golf Association national championships.
The Evian Championship	Golf Channel (subscription)	Full coverage	Part of LPGA broadcast rights.
Women's British Open	NBC (free-to-air)	Weekend round coverage	2016–2028 (part of Open Championship broadcast rights)
Women's British Open	USA Network (subscription)	Early-round coverage	2016–2028 (part of Open Championship broadcast rights)

=== Major tours ===
Tour	Rightsholder	Extent of coverage	Current contract term/notes
PGA Tour	CBS (free-to-air)	Weekend round coverage of at least 19 tournaments per-season.; Alternates with NBC to broadcast the three FedEx Cup Playoffs tournaments beginning 2022.	2011–2030
PGA Tour	NBC (free-to-air)	Weekend round coverage of at least 8 tournaments per-season, including The Players Championship; Alternates with CBS to broadcast the three FedEx Cup Playoffs tournaments beginning 2022.; Ryder Cup & Presidents Cup	2011–2030
PGA Tour	Golf Channel (subscription)	Early-round coverage of all tournaments, 4 round coverage of tournaments not aired by CBS or NBC; Coverage of the senior PGA Tour Champions circuit and the developmental Korn Ferry Tour.	2011–2030
PGA Tour	ESPN+ (streaming)	Live coverage from 36 tournaments a year, including a full four days of coverage at 28 events; Four simultaneous live feeds each day	2022–2030
LPGA	Golf Channel (subscription)	Exclusive coverage of all events (select events may have weekend coverage on NBC); Solheim Cup	2022–2030
LPGA	CNBC (subscription)	Overflow coverage of selected events and rounds.	2024–2025
DP World Tour (European Tour)	Golf Channel (subscription)	Exclusive rights for coverage of most events (shared coverage of the Scottish Open with ESPN+ and CBS)	2015–2024
LIV Golf	Fox Sports (free-to-air and paid)		2025–present
LIV Golf	Fox Sports App (streaming)		2025–present

== Ice hockey ==
=== National Hockey League ===
As of the 2021–22 NHL season, the national media rights of the National Hockey League (NHL) are divided between ESPN and TNT Sports under seven-year contracts;

Rightsholder	Extent of coverage
ESPN/ABC	At least 37 exclusive regular season games per-season between ESPN and ESPN2.; At least 16 exclusive regular season games per-season on ABC.; ABC's broadcasts consist primarily of a late-season ABC Hockey Saturday package on most Saturday afternoons and some Saturday nights in the later half of the season.; Rights to first round of the NHL entry draft, shown on ESPN; Rights to the Opening Night games, shown on ESPN; Rights to the NHL All-Star Game, shown on ABC, NHL All-Star Skills Competition, shown on ESPN, and NHL All-Star Player Draft, shown on ESPN2; Rights to the NHL Stadium Series; Rights to half of the Stanley Cup playoffs, including one conference final per-season. ABC/ESPN has the first choice of which conference final to air.; Broadcasts the Stanley Cup Final in even-numbered years. Rights to broadcast supplemental feeds on other ESPN platforms.; Rights to the NHL Awards, shown on ESPN in even years
ESPN+	Up to 48 exclusive regular season games per season, simulcast on Hulu and Disney+ (latter since 2024-25).; Stream of 1050+ out-of-market regular season games.; Simulcasts of all ABC games, select ESPN games, and the Stanley Cup Finals.; No more than 8 games per team each season can be exclusive to ESPN+.
TNT Sports	Up to 72 exclusive regular season games per-season on TNT, primarily on Wednesday nights.; Rights to the NHL Winter Classic and Heritage Classic (the latter in years when it is scheduled); Rights to the NHL Thanksgiving Showdown; Rights to simulcast and/or provide supplemental broadcasts for select games on truTV; Rights to half of the Stanley Cup playoffs, including one conference final per-season.; Broadcasts the Stanley Cup Final in odd-numbered years, simulcast on TBS and truTV; Rights to the NHL Awards, shown on TNT in odd years; Streaming rights to all games on HBO Max.
NHL Network	20 regular season games under NHL Network Showcase brand, using own production. Not available in local markets; Simulcat of various regular season games from one team's local TV broadcaster. Blacked out in the participating markets of the two teams

Local or regional broadcasters contract with the NHL team in their area for the right to broadcast several regular-season games locally.

Radio

Sports USA Radio airs selected regular season and postseason games, including the entire Stanley Cup Finals. NHL teams also contract with local radio broadcasters to air game; games are also simulcast from local radio feeds on the SiriusXM satellite radio platform.

=== Premier Hockey Federation ===
The Premier Hockey Federation (PHF; formerly the National Women's Hockey League) has primarily partnered with streaming outlets, which have in the past included ESPN3, Cheddar, and Twitter. In 2019, the league signed with Twitch to stream games and ancillary content, in its first contract to ever include a rights fee.

NBCSN was to televise the league's 2021 semi-final and finals in the NWHL's first linear rights deal.

The NWHL had also reached an agreement with NBCSN to carry the 2021 Isobel Cup semi-finals and finals, which would marked the first NWHL games to be broadcast nationally on a linear television channel.

For 2021–22 season, The PHF, will stream 60 regular season games, special events and its Isobel Cup Playoffs exclusively on ESPN+ in the U.S.

=== Southern Professional Hockey League ===
- America One: Regular season, playoffs and Championships through 2014

=== College hockey ===
Regular season games air locally, often via regional sports networks (such as Bally Sports) and networks contracted with conferences, these conferences include:

- Big Ten Conference: Big Ten Network
- Hockey East: ESPN Networks
- ECAC Hockey: ESPN Networks
- NCHC: CBS Sports Network
- Notre Dame: NBC Sports
- NCAA Men's Ice Hockey Championship: ESPNU (regional semi-finals and finals), ESPN2 (national semi-finals), ESPN (national championship), and Westwood One (radio)

=== Other ice hockey leagues ===
- Ice Hockey World Championships: NHL Network and ESPN+
- IIHF World U20 Championship: NHL Network and ESPN+
- Memorial Cup (Canada): NHL Network
- American Hockey League: select games on NHL Network, select regional coverage by local broadcasters, All-Star Game and Skills Competition on regional sports networks
- Swedish Hockey League: Next Level Sports
- Australian Ice Hockey League: YouTube
- Professional Women's Hockey League: YouTube

== Horse racing ==
NBC holds the rights to two of three races in the Triple Crown, the Kentucky Derby through 2032, and the Preakness Stakes through 2026, USA Network, CNBC or Peacock provides supplementary coverage, including previews and associated undercard races on Fridays preceding the Saturday races (including the Kentucky Oaks and Black-Eyed Susan Stakes). NBC also carries coverage of the Road to the Kentucky Derby series, including the Florida Derby, Santa Anita Derby and Blue Grass Stakes races. NBC and CNBC also carry the Breeders' Cup since 2022, with CNBC carrying most of the coverage, and the Breeders' Cup Classic airing on the main network.

Fox Sports has the rights to the Belmont Stakes through 2030. Fox and FS1 both air the Belmont, with FS1 providing extra supplementary coverage. Fox Sports also has an agreement with the NYRA for year-round coverage of NYRA races from Saratoga Race Course and Belmont Park.

FanDuel TV and FanDuel Racing also air live horse racing.

== Lacrosse ==
=== Premier Lacrosse League ===
- ESPN: 3 games including championship game live on ABC, 3 games on ESPN, 6 games on ESPN2, and every game on ESPN+.
- ESPN+ and Lax Sports Network

=== Women's Professional Lacrosse League ===
- ESPN

=== National Lacrosse League ===
- FloSports

=== College lacrosse ===
Varsity lacrosse

- NCAA Men's Lacrosse Championship: First round and Quarterfinal matches on ESPNU or ESPNews, Semi-finals on ESPN2, Final on ESPN. Effective with the 2011 tournament, internet streaming on Turner Sports (possibly through its administration of the official NCAA sports website).

Club Lacrosse

- Men's Collegiate Lacrosse Association: Semi-finals and Championship of both division 1 and 2 broadcast nationally on Fox College Sports, usually the Pacific affiliate. Championships also simulcast on the MCLA website.
- BYU TV: At least one home MCLA game featuring BYU, but BYUtv Sports has rights to all home games.

=== International lacrosse ===
- ESPN2 & ESPN+: FIL World Lacrosse Championship

== Kickboxing ==
- King of Kings: DAZN

== Mixed martial arts ==
- Ultimate Fighting Championship: CBS Sports and Paramount+
- Professional Fighters League: ESPN
- Legacy Fighting Alliance: ESPN Deportes
- Bushido MMA: DAZN
- ONE Championship: Prime Video
- Legend FC: NBC Sports

== Motorsport ==
=== NASCAR ===
Fox Sports, NBC Sports, Amazon Prime Video and TNT Sports have contracts for all NASCAR Cup Series events through 2031, while The CW have contract for all NASCAR Xfinity Series events also through 2031. On October 15, 2012, NASCAR and the Fox Sports Media Group (FSMG) announced a new $2.4 billion eight-year deal, a 30% increase from their previous deal. On July 23, 2013, NASCAR and the NBC Sports Group announced a new $4.4 billion ten-year deal. Ten days later on August 1, 2013, NASCAR and Fox extended and expanded their agreement, paying an additional $1.4 billion to do so, to complete NASCAR's new TV package through the 2024 season. In July 2023, broadcast network The CW signed a TV rights deal to broadcast the NASCAR Xfinity Series from 2025 to 2031 for an estimated $115 million annual fee. In November 2023, NASCAR announced a television and streaming deal for the NASCAR Cup Series and NASCAR Truck Series from 2025 to 2031 for a $1.1 billion annual fee. Fox Sports and NBC Sports will distribute 14 Cup races each, with five and four races on their broadcast networks respectively. Fox Sports will continue to air early season spring races including the Daytona 500, while NBC will continue to show late-season fall races including the entire NASCAR Cup Series playoffs. Amazon Prime Video will stream five Cup races in the early summer, as well as practice and qualifying for the first half of the season except for the Clash, Daytona 500 and All-Star Race. TNT will show the remaining five Cup races in the late summer, which will also be streamed on the Bleacher Report Sports Add-On on HBO Max. Practice and qualifying will air on TruTV and Max for the second half of the season. It was also announced that Fox Sports would continue its arrangement with the Truck series from the previous media deal.

- NASCAR Cup Series
  - Fox Sports airs the first 14 races.
    - Fox airs four races, including the Daytona 500 and also The Clash.
    - FS1 airs eight races, plus the Daytona 500 Duel races and NASCAR All-Star Race.
    - Fox Deportes airs multiple races in Spanish.
  - Prime Video airs the first 5 mid-season races including the Coca-Cola 600, plus all practices and qualifying sessions for the first half of the season, except for Daytona 500, The Duel, Busch Light Clash and NASCAR All-Star Race.
  - TNT Sports airs the remaining 5 mid-season races on TNT, plus all practices and qualifying sessions for the remainder of the season aired on truTV and streamed on HBO Max.
  - NBC Sports airs 4 of the final 14 races.
    - NBC airs four races, including the Coke Zero Sugar 400 and the Championship Race.
    - Telemundo Deportes airs multiple races in Spanish on Universo.
  - USA Sports airs 10 of the final 14 races
    - USA Network airs ten races. Some races may air on CNBC if there is a sports conflict.
- NASCAR Xfinity Series
  - The CW airs all races.
- NASCAR Craftsman Truck Series
  - FS1 (or if there is a sports conflict, FS2 or Fox Business) airs all races.
- Other series
  - ARCA Menards Series
    - All races air on Fox Sports 1 or 2. FloRacing also airs 10 races.
  - ARCA Menard Series East and West
    - FloRacing airs all standalone events live and they will air later in a 45 min highlight on USA.
    - MavTV and FloRacing simultaneously air eleven races, including three combination races.
  - NASCAR Whelen Modified Tour
    - FloRacing airs all races with select events later shown in a 45 min highlight on USA.
  - NASCAR Advance Auto Parts Weekly Series
    - FloRacing airs select NASCAR Roots events throughout the country including weekly racing at Bowman Gray Stadium, New Smyrna Speedway, and Berlin Raceway.
  - NASCAR Pinty's Series
    - YouTube airs all events.
  - NASCAR Euro Series
    - DAZN airs all events.

=== IndyCar ===
As of 2025, Fox Sports is the exclusive broadcaster of all IndyCar Series races, with all races, as well as the weekend qualifying sessions for the Indianapolis 500, on Fox. FS1 and FS2 broadcasts IndyCar practice and qualifying sessions for the remaining races, and all Indy NXT races.

=== Formula One ===
ESPN aired Formula One from 1984 to 1997. Speed and Fox Sports Net shared broadcasting rights from 1998 to 2000. Speedvision and its successor Speed Channel continued to broadcast the championship until 2012. Fox aired select races from 2007 to 2012. NBC Sports had English-language TV broadcasting rights from 2013 through 2017. Races were televised by NBC, NBCSN or CNBC and streamed on NBC Sports Live Extra.

ESPN became the new broadcaster in 2018. The network unveiled plans to show over 100 hours of F1 programming during their first season returning to the sport. This included plans to show every practice and qualifying session in some capacity. Race broadcasts would be spread across ESPN and ESPN2 with plans to show live coverage of Canada GP, the American and Mexican Grand Prix live on ABC while also showing the Monaco Grand Prix on tape-delay. March 1 of that year they announced the launch of their own Over-the-top media service called F1 TV Pro what show races live and on-demand.

Apple TV acquired the rights to F1 beginning in 2026.

=== IMSA ===
- WeatherTech SportsCar Championship
  - NBC Sports feature full season coverage across NBC, USA Network and Peacock
- Michelin Pilot Challenge
  - Peacock
- IMSA Prototype Challenge
  - Peacock
- Lamborghini Super Trofeo
  - Select races will feature live streaming coverage on IMSA.tv
- IMSA GT3 Cup Challenge presented by Yokohama
  - Select races will feature live streaming coverage on IMSA.tv
- IMSA GT3 Cup Challenge Canada
  - Select races will feature live streaming coverage on IMSA.tv

=== Motorcycle racing ===
==== SuperMotocross World Championship ====
Includes the AMA Supercross Championship and AMA Motocross Championship.

- NBC: Eight races, of which six are live
- USA: Six races, of which four are live
- Peacock: Every race live
- CNBC: Every race on next day delay

==== Other motorcycle racing ====
- American Flat Track: FloRacing (live), Fox Sports (delayed)
- FIM MotoGP World Championship: Fox Sports
- Motocross World Championship: CBS Sports Network
- Superbike World Championship: Racer Network
- Arenacross: Ryde TV (live), CBS Sports Network (delayed)
- MotoAmerica: MotoAmerica Live+, Samsung TV Plus, Vice TV

=== Open wheel racing ===
- FIA Formula 2: Apple TV and F1TV Pro
- FIA Formula 3: Apple TV and F1TV Pro
- F1 Academy: Apple TV and F1TV Pro
- FIA Formula E Championship: ABC, ESPN, and ESPN Deportes
- Historic Grand Prix of Monaco: MavTV

=== Drag racing ===
- ANDRA Drag Racing: MavTV / MavTV Plus (delay)
- 400 Thunder Drag Racing Series: MavTV / MavTV Plus (delay)
- NHRA E3 Spark Plugs Pro Mod Series: Fox Sports
- NHRA Lucas Oil Sportsman Series: Fox Sports
- NHRA Mello Yello Drag Racing Series: Fox Sports – full season / select races with live coverage

=== Short track racing ===
- All Star Circuit of Champions: FloRacing (live)
- American Canadian Tour: Speed51.com (Select Live events)
- ARCA/CRA Super Series: Speed51.com
- ARCA Midwest Tour: Speed51.com
- ASCS National Tour: DIRTvision.com
- CARS Tour: SpeedSport.tv and Carstour.tv (live)
- Eldora Speedway events: FloRacing (live) *non World of Outlaws and NASCAR events
- Granite State Pro Stock Series: Speed51.com (live)
- FASTRAK Racing Series: Speed51.com (live)
- Knoxville Raceway events: DIRTvision.com
- INEX Legends Car Racing: Legendsnatition.tv (live – select races)
- Chili Bowl: MAVTV / MAVTV Plus (Saturday features), FloRacing (prelim nights)
- Lucas Oil Late Model Dirt Series: MAVTV (live / delayed), CBS Sports (delayed), MAVTV Plus (live)
- Lucas Oil Speedway: MAVTV / MAVTV Plus
- NARC King of the West 410 Sprints: FloRacing (live)
- PA Speedweek: FloRacing (live), SprintCarUnlimited TV (live)
- POWRI Lucas Oil National Midgets: MavTV (delayed), MAVTV Plus (live)
- POWRI Lucas Oil BCRA Midget Series: MAVTV (delayed – Madera)
- SRL Southwest Tour: MAVTV (delayed), MavTV Plus (live), Speed51.com (live)
- Super DIRTcar Series: FloRacing (live), select races on MAVTV (delayed)
- Sprint Car Challenge Tour: FloRacing (live)
- Snowball Derby: Speed51.com (live)
- Southeast Super Truck: SpeedSport.tv (live)
- Southeast Legends Tour: Legendsnatition.tv (live)
- Summer Shootout: MAVTV / MavTV Plus (delay)
- United States Modified Touring: RacinDirt.com
- USAC SIlver Crown Champ Car Series: FloRacing
- USAC AMSOIL National Sprint Car Championship: FloRacing
- USAC NOS Energy National Midget Championship: FloRacing
- ULTIMATE Series: Speed51.com (Select Live events)
- World of Outlaws Morton Buildings Late Models: DIRTvision.com (live), CBS Sports Network (delayed – select races)
- World of Outlaws NOS Energy Sprint Cars: DIRTvision.com (live), CBS Sports Network (delayed – select races)
- William Grove Speedway events: DIRTvision.com

=== Off-road racing ===
- AMSOIL Snocross: CBS Sports Network
- Dakar Rally: Peacock, CNBC
- Nitro Rallycross: Peacock
- FIA World Rally Championship Live on WRC+ and day highlights on Red Bull TV, select stages on Racer Network
- FIA World Rallycross Championship (WRX): YouTube

=== Touring car racing ===
- Supercars Championship: Racer Network

=== Endurance racing ===
- FIA World Endurance Championship / 24 Hours of Le Mans: HBO Max

=== Other ===
- GT World Challenge America: Fox Sports (tape delay), YouTube
- GT World Challenge Asia: YouTube
- GT World Challenge Europe: YouTube
- Deutsche Tourenwagen Masters: Racer Network
- European Le Mans Series: ELMS YouTube page
- Ferrari Challenge: Ferrari YouTube page and Motor Trend on Demand
- GT World Challenge America: Fox Sports (tape delay), live streaming on series website
- GT Open: GT Open YouTube page
- Intercontinental GT Challenge: YouTube
- Lucas Oil Pro Pulling League: Racer Network (delayed), Racer+ (select events live)
- Monster Jam: Racer Network, YouTube
- Porsche Supercup: Apple TV and F1TV Pro
- Race of Champions: Racer Network
- Shannons Nationals Motor Racing Championships: Racer Network (tape delayed)
- Super GT: Motorsport.tv
- Nürburgring Langstrecken Serie: Nürburgring and The Race YouTube page and motorsport.tv (Same for the 24 Hour Nürburgring)
- 24H Series: 24H Series YouTube page

== Multi-discipline events ==
- Olympic Games: NBCUniversal has rights to the Summer and Winter Olympic Games through 2036.
  - NBC has held the American broadcasting rights to the Summer Olympic Games since the 1988 games and the rights to the Winter Olympic Games since the 2002 games. In 2011, NBC agreed to a $4.38 billion contract with the International Olympic Committee to broadcast the Olympics through the 2020 games, the most expensive television rights deal in Olympic history. NBC then agreed to a $7.75 billion contract extension on May 7, 2014, to air the Olympics through the 2032 games. NBC is one of the major sources of revenue for the IOC.
- Pan American Games: ESPN and ESPN Deportes through 2019.
- Central American and Caribbean Games: ESPN Deportes and ESPN3
- Commonwealth Games: beIN SPORTS
- Special Olympics World Games: ESPN
- Invictus Games: ESPN
- Warrior Games: ESPN
- Universiade: TBA

== Rugby league ==
- Rugby League World Cup: Premier Sports
- National Rugby League:
  - Fox Sports 2: holds the rights to three matches for each round of the regular season, and for all games part of the Finals Series, including the Grand Final.
  - WatchNRL: shows every match of the season, including the Finals Series and Grand Final.
- NRL Women's:
  - Fox Sports 2: holds the rights to all matches for each round of the regular season, and for all games part of the Finals Series, including the Grand Final.
  - WatchNRL: shows every match of the season, including the Finals Series and Grand Final.
- State of Origin series:
  - Fox Sports 2: televises all three games of the series.
- Women's State of Origin:
  - Fox Sports 2: televises all three games of the series.
  - WatchNRL: shows all three games of the series.
- Super League and Challenge Cup:
  - Fox Soccer Plus airs all televised Super League matches, select matches from the RFL Championship and all televised Challenge Cup ties, including the final. Fox Soccer Plus no longer foresees airing sports other than soccer. The Super League Grand Final airs on Fox Sports 2.

== Rugby union ==
=== Major League Rugby ===
All matches stream live on ESPN+ with select matches airing on ESPN2. Replays are available free of charge on The Rugby Network

The Championship Final is broadcast on ESPN2 and ESPN+

Local television

- Additionally, local or regional broadcasters contract with the MLR team in their area for the right to broadcast a number of regular season games locally, primarily on regional sports networks.

=== International rugby ===
CBS has rights to all World Rugby international events through 2029, including:

- men's 2027 as well as both women's 2025 and 2029 editions of Rugby World Cup
- USA men's and women's national team matches
- Nations Cup
- World Rugby Under 20 Championship
- HSBC SVNS
- WXV Women's Tournament
- Pacific Nations Cup
- Pacific Four Series

Other international competitions/tournaments

- Nations Championship: RugbyPass
- The Rugby Championship: FloSports
- Super Rugby: Rugby Pass TV
- European Rugby Champions Cup: FloSports
- European Rugby Challenge Cup: FloSports
- Top 14: FloSports
- Premiership Rugby: FloSports
- United Rugby Championship: FloSports
- Six Nations Championship: NBC
- Super Rugby Americas: ESPN
- Test matches: FloSports

=== Rugby sevens ===
- Premiership Rugby Sevens Series: FloSports
- Collegiate Rugby Championship: ESPN

== Soccer ==
=== International competitions ===
Broadcasting contracts for international soccer competitions
Event	Rightsholder	Broadcast Details
FIFA World Cup finals	Fox Sports	English-language rights through 2026
FIFA World Cup finals	Telemundo Deportes	Spanish-language rights through 2026
FIFA World Cup qualification	TBA	English and Spanish-language rights; CONCACAF qualification matches for the 2030 FIFA World Cup
FIFA World Cup qualification	TBA	English language rights; UEFA European qualification matches for the 2030 FIFA World Cup
FIFA World Cup qualification	TBA	Spanish-language rights; UEFA European qualification matches for the 2030 FIFA World Cup
FIFA World Cup qualification	TBA	English and Spanish-language rights; CONMEBOL qualification matches for the 2030 FIFA World Cup
FIFA World Cup qualification	TBA	English-language rights; AFC third and fourth round qualification matches for the 2030 FIFA World Cup
FIFA World Cup qualification	TBA	AFC qualification matches for the 2030 FIFA World Cup
FIFA World Cup qualification	TBA	English and Spanish-language rights; CAF qualification matches for the 2030 FIFA World Cup
FIFA World Cup qualification	TBA	English-language rights; OFC qualification matches for the 2030 FIFA World Cup
FIFA World Cup qualification	TBA	English-language rights; Inter-confederation play-off matches for the 2030 FIFA World Cup
FIFA Club World Cup	TNT Sports (TNT, TruTV, and TBS)	English-language rights; 24 of 63 matches live for the 2025 tournament
FIFA Club World Cup	DAZN	English and Spanish-language rights; all 63 matches live for the 2025 tournament
FIFA Women's World Cup finals (History)	Netflix	English and Spanish-language rights through 2031
FIFA Women's World Cup qualification	CBS Sports	English-language rights; UEFA qualification matches
FIFA Women's World Cup qualification	CBS Sports	English-language rights; CONCACAF qualification matches
FIFA Women's World Cup qualification	Univision	Spanish-language rights; CONCACAF qualification matches
FIFA Women's World Cup qualification	beIN Sports	English, Spanish, and Arabic-language rights; CAF qualification matches
FIFA Women's World Cup qualification	FIFA+	English-language rights; OFC qualification matches
FIFA Women's World Cup qualification	FIFA+	English-language rights; Inter-confederation play-off matches
FIFA Women's Champions Cup	FIFA+	English-language rights; first four matches only in 2026 (first-second rounds and both semi finals)
FIFA Women's Champions Cup	DAZN	English and Spanish-language rights; both semi finals matches only in 2026
FIFA Women's Champions Cup	CBS Sports	Both finals matches only (gold/silver and bronze) in 2026
UEFA European Championship (History)	Fox Sports, FuboTV	English-language rights through Euro 2028, includes qualifiers and finals
UEFA European Championship (History)	Univision	Spanish-language rights through Euro 2028, includes qualifiers and finals
UEFA Nations League	Fox Sports, FuboTV	English-language rights through 2028
UEFA Nations League	Univision	Spanish-language rights through 2028
UEFA Champions League (History)	CBS Sports	English-language rights through 2030, including select qualification matches
UEFA Champions League (History)	Univision	Spanish-language rights through 2027
UEFA Champions League (History)	DAZN	Spanish-language rights for 38 matches through 2027 (sublicensed from TelevisaUnivision)
UEFA Champions League (History)	Telemundo Deportes	Spanish-language rights from 2027 through 2030
UEFA Europa League	CBS Sports	English-language rights through 2030, including select qualification matches
UEFA Europa League	Univision	Spanish-language rights through 2027
UEFA Europa League	Telemundo Deportes	Spanish-language rights from 2027 through 2030
UEFA Europa League	DAZN	Spanish-language rights for selected matches through 2027 (sublicensed from TelevisaUnivision)
UEFA Conference League	CBS Sports	English-language rights through 2030, including select qualification matches
UEFA Conference League	Univision	Spanish-language rights through 2027
UEFA Conference League	Telemundo Deportes	Spanish-language rights from 2027 through 2030
UEFA Super Cup	CBS Sports	English-language rights through 2029
UEFA Super Cup	Univision	Spanish-language rights through 2026
UEFA Super Cup	Telemundo Deportes	Spanish-language rights from 2027 through 2029
UEFA Women's Champions League	CBS Sports	English-language rights through 2030
UEFA Women's Champions League	ESPN Deportes	Spanish-language rights through 2030
CONMEBOL Copa América (History)	Fox Sports	English-language rights through 2024
CONMEBOL Copa América (History)	Univision	Spanish-language rights through 2024
Copa Libertadores	beIN Sports	English and Spanish-language rights through 2026
Copa Libertadores	Univision	Spanish language rights from 2027 through 2030
Copa Libertadores Femenina	YouTube	Spanish language rights
Copa Sudamericana	beIN Sports	English and Spanish-language rights through 2026
Copa Sudamericana	Univision	Spanish language rights from 2027 through 2030
Recopa Sudamericana	Univision	Spanish language rights from 2027 through 2030
CONCACAF Gold Cup	Fox Sports	English-language rights through 2029
CONCACAF Gold Cup	Univision	Spanish-language rights through 2029
CONCACAF W Gold Cup	CBS Sports	English-language rights through 2029
CONCACAF W Gold Cup	ESPN Deportes	Spanish-language rights
CONCACAF Nations League	Fox Sports	English-language rights until 2029, exclude US matches at the quarter finals
CONCACAF Nations League	TelevisaUnivision (Univision, TUDN, Vix)	Spanish-language rights until 2029, exclude US matches at the quarter finals
CONCACAF Champions Cup	CBS Sports	English and Spanish-language rights through 2030
CONCACAF W Champions Cup	CBS Sports	English-language rights through 2030
CONCACAF W Champions Cup	ESPN	Spanish-language rights
AFC Asian Cup	CBS Sports	English-language rights until 2027
AFC Champions League Elite	YouTube	
AFC Champions League Two	YouTube	
AFC Women's Champions League	YouTube	
Africa Cup of Nations	beIN Sports	English and Spanish-language rights, includes qualifiers and finals
CAF Champions League	beIN Sports	English and Spanish-language rights, includes qualifiers and finals
CAF Confederation Cup	beIN Sports	English and Spanish-language rights, includes qualifiers and finals
CAF Super Cup	beIN Sports	English and Spanish-language rights, includes qualifiers and finals
CAF Women's Champions League	beIN Sports	English and Spanish-language rights, includes qualifiers and finals
OFC Nations Cup	FIFA+	English-language rights
OFC Champions League	FIFA+	English-language rights

Other international competitions/tournaments

- FIFA Futsal World Cup: TBA (2028)
- FIFA Women's Futsal World Cup: TBA (2029)
- FIFA Beach Soccer World Cup: TBA (from 2027)
- FIFA U-20 World Cup: TBA (from 2027)
- FIFA U-17 World Cup: Fox Sports (English), Telemundo Deportes (Spanish)
- FIFA U-20 Women's World Cup: TBA (from 2028)
- FIFA U-17 Women's World Cup: Fox Sports (English), Telemundo Deportes (Spanish)
- FIFA Arab Cup: beIN Sports (Arabic)
- FIFA Intercontinental Cup: beIN Sports (English and Spanish)
- UEFA European Under-21 Championship: TBA
- UEFA European Under-19 Championship: Univision (Spanish)
- UEFA European Under-17 Championship: Univision (Spanish)
- UEFA Futsal Championship: Univision (Spanish)
- UEFA Under-19 Futsal Championship: Univision (Spanish)
- UEFA Women's Championship: Fox Sports (United States) (English), Univision (Spanish)
- UEFA Women's Nations League: CBS Sports (English language rights) and YouTube (Germany home matches only)
- UEFA Women's Under-19 Championship: Univision (Spanish)
- UEFA Women's Under-17 Championship: Univision (Spanish)
- UEFA Women's Futsal Championship: UEFA.tv (English), Univision (Spanish)
- UEFA Youth League: UEFA.tv (English)
- UEFA Futsal Champions League: UEFA.tv (English)
- CONCACAF W Championship: CBS Sports (English), Univision (Spanish)
- CONCACAF Men's Olympic Qualifying Tournament: Fox Sports (English), Univision (Spanish)
- CONCACAF Central American Cup: CBS Sports (English anda Spanish)
- CONCACAF Caribbean Cup: CBS Sports (English and Spanish)
- CONCACAF Futsal Championship: YouTube (English), Univision (Spanish)
- CONCACAF Beach Soccer Championship: YouTube (English), Univision (Spanish)
- CONCACAF Under-20 Championship: YouTube (English, group stage) and Fox Sports (English, knockout stage), Univision (Spanish)
- CONCACAF Women's U-20 Championship: Fox Sports (English), Univision (Spanish through 2020)
- CONCACAF Under-17 Championship: Fox Sports (English), Univision (Spanish through 2021)
- CONCACAF Women's U-17 Championship: Fox Sports (English), Univision (Spanish through 2020)
- Copa América Femenina: Fox Sports (English through 2026), Univision (Spanish through 2022)
- CONMEBOL Women's Nations League: Fox Sports (English), Univision (Spanish)
- CONMEBOL Pre-Olympic Tournament: Fox Sports (English through 2024), Univision (Spanish through 2024)
- Copa América de Futsal: Fox Sports (English and Spanish through 2023)
- Copa América de Beach Soccer: Fox Sports (English and Spanish through 2023)
- South American Youth Football Championship: Fox Sports (English and Spanish through 2025)
- South American U-20 Women's Championship: Fox Sports (English and Spanish)
- South American U-17 Championship: Fox Sports (English and Spanish through 2025)
- South American Under-17 Women's Football Championship: Fox Sports (English and Spanish)
- CONMEBOL–UEFA Cup of Champions: Fox Sports (English), Univision (Spanish)
- UEFA–CONMEBOL Women's Finalissima: Univision (Spanish)
- CONMEBOL–UEFA Futsal Championship: UEFA.tv (English), Univision (Spanish)
- CONMEBOL–UEFA Youth Club Championship: Fox Sports (English), Univision (Spanish)
- AFC Women's Asian Cup: TBA (2029)
- AFC U-23 Asian Cup: CBS Sports (English)
- AFC Women's Olympic Qualifying Tournament: YouTube (English)
- AFC U-20 Asian Cup: YouTube (English)
- AFC U-20 Women's Asian Cup: YouTube (English)
- AFC U-17 Asian Cup: YouTube (English)
- AFC U-17 Women's Asian Cup: YouTube (English)
- AFF Championship: YouTube (English)
- AFC Futsal Asian Cup: YouTube (English)
- AFC U-20 Futsal Asian Cup: Eleven Sports (English)
- AFC Beach Soccer Asian Cup: YouTube (English)
- AFC Futsal Club Championship: YouTube (English)
- AFC Women's Futsal Asian Cup: YouTube (English)
- Africa Women Cup of Nations: beIN Sports (English)
- CAF U-23 Championship: beIN Sports (English)
- Africa Futsal Cup of Nations: beIN Sports (English)
- OFC Men's Olympic Qualifying Tournament: Eleven Sports (English)
- OFC Women's Nations Cup: Eleven Sports (English)
- SheBelieves Cup: Turner Sports (English)
- Algarve Cup: YouTube (English)
- Florida Cup: beIN Sports (English)
- The Women's Cup: CBS Sports (English)
- Toulon Tournament: beIN Sports (English)
- Gothia Cup: Eleven Sports (English)
- Generation Adidas Cup: YouTube and Twitch (English)

National teams

- United States: TNT Sports has English language rights for men's and women's national team games until 2030, with all games streaming on HBO Max and approximately half of the games also available on TNT. Spanish language rights are held by Telemundo Deportes on Telemundo, Universo, and Peacock.
- Canada: Fox Sports (English)
- Mexico: Fox Deportes (English), TUDN (Spanish)
- UEFA men's international friendlies: Fox Sports and FuboTV (English), Univision (Spanish)
- Germany: YouTube (men's U-21 only) and CBS
- Italy: Rai Italia (Italian) (men's U-21 only)
- Australia: YouTube (English)

=== National competitions ===
Broadcasting contracts for national soccer competitions
Event	Country	Broadcaster	Broadcast Details
Major League Soccer (History)	(United States) (Canada)	Apple TV	Until 2029: all matches.
Major League Soccer (History)	(United States) (Canada)	Fox Sports	Until 2026: non-exclusive coverage of 34 regular season matches (15 on Fox), 8 MLS Cup playoff matches, and MLS Cup. Spanish-language rights for Fox Deportes.
U.S. Open Cup	(United States)	CBS Sports/Paramount+	English-language rights through 2026: final 31 remaining matches from round of 32 until final
USL Championship	(United States)	ESPN, ESPN2, ESPN+	English-language rights
USL Championship	(United States)	CBS Sports/Paramount+	English-language rights on CBS, CBS Sports Network, CBS Sports Golazo Network, and Paramount+ through 2027
USL League One	(United States)	ESPN+	English-language rights
USL League One	(United States)	CBS Sports/Paramount+	English-language rights through 2027. Selected matches on CBS Sports Network, CBS Sports Golazo Network, and Paramount+
USL Cup	(United States)	ESPN+	English-language rights
National Independent Soccer Association	(United States)	NISA+	
MLS Next Pro	(United States) (Canada)	MLSNextPro.com	Selected matches and also streams on YouTube
MLS Next Pro	(United States) (Canada)	Apple TV	Selected matches through 2032
USL League Two	(United States)	SportsEngine Play	
National Premier Soccer League	(United States)	DMV Sports Media YouTube	
United Premier Soccer League	(United States)	TBD	
National Women's Soccer League (History)	(United States)	CBS Sports/Paramount+	English-language rights on CBS, CBS Sports Network and Paramount+ through 2027
National Women's Soccer League (History)	(United States)	ABC, ESPN, ESPN2, ESPN+	English and Spanish-language rights through 2027
National Women's Soccer League (History)	(United States)	Prime Video	English-language rights through 2027
National Women's Soccer League (History)	(United States)	Ion Television	English-language rights through 2027
National Women's Soccer League (History)	(United States)	NWSL+	
USL Super League	(United States)	Peacock	
USL W League	(United States)	SportsEngine Play	
Women's Premier Soccer League	(United States)	National Soccer Network YouTube	
College Cup	(United States)	ESPNU, ESPN+	
Women's College Cup	(United States)	ESPNU, ESPN+	
MLS Next	(United States) (Canada)	Apple TV	Selected matches from 2023 to 2032
MLS Next Cup	(United States) (Canada)	YouTube	
USL Academy	(United States)	Eleven Sports	
Major Arena Soccer League	(United States)	Twitch	English-language rights
Major League Futsal	(United States)	Facebook	English-language rights
Canadian Premier League	(Canada)	OneSoccer	English-language rights, all matches
Canadian Premier League	(Canada)	Fox Sports	English-language rights, select matches only
Canadian Championship	(Canada)	OneSoccer	English-language rights
Canadian Championship	(Canada)	Fox Sports	English-language rights
League1 Canada	(Canada)	OneSoccer	English-language rights
Northern Super League	(Canada)	ESPN+	English-language rights
Liga MX	(Mexico)	Fox Sports	Rights to home matches from Juarez and UANL.
Liga MX	(Mexico)	CBS Sports	At least 40 matches will air in English on CBSSN or Golazo Network
Liga MX	(Mexico)	TUDN, Univision, ViX, TUDNxtra	Rights to home matches from America, Atlas, Atletico San Luis, Leon, Mazatlan, Monterrey, Necaxa, Pachuca, Puebla, Querétaro, Santos Laguna, Tijuana, Toluca, and UNAM
Liga MX	(Mexico)	Fox Deportes	Rights to home matches from Guadalajara (in tape delay), Tigres UANL and Juarez
Liga MX	(Mexico)	Telemundo, Universo, Peacock	Rights to home matches from Guadalajara, Tigres UANL and Juarez
Campeón de Campeones	(Mexico)	Univision	Spanish-language
Supercopa MX	(Mexico)	Univision	Spanish-language
Liga de Expansión MX	(Mexico)	TUDN	Spanish-language
Liga MX Femenil	(Mexico)	TUDN	Spanish-language
Leagues Cup	(Mexico) (United States) (Canada)	Apple TV	English-language rights from 2023 to 2032
Leagues Cup	(Mexico) (United States) (Canada)	Fox Sports	English-language rights from 2023 to 2026: ten group stage matches, four round of 32 matches and two round of 16 matches.
Leagues Cup	(Mexico) (United States) (Canada)	Univision	Spanish-language rights from 2023 to 2026: twelve group stage matches, eight knockout round matches, Leagues Cup Final.
Campeones Cup	(Mexico) (United States) (Canada)	Apple TV	English-language rights from 2023 to 2032
Campeones Cup	(Mexico) (United States) (Canada)	Univision	Spanish-language rights
Europe's Big Five
Event	Country	Broadcaster	Broadcast Details
Premier League (History)	(England)	NBC Sports, Peacock	English-language rights until 2028
Premier League (History)	(England)	Telemundo Deportes	Spanish-language rights until 2028
EFL Leagues	(England)	CBS/Paramount+	English-language rights through 2028; all play-off matches, minimum of 155 Championship matches and 38 League One/League Two matches
EFL Cup	(England)	CBS/Paramount+	English-language rights through 2028; minimum of 30 matches per year
EFL Trophy	(England)	CBS/Paramount+	English-language rights through 2028 to three matches per year
Women's Super League	(England)	CBS/Paramount+	English language rights through 2030
Women's Players Cup	(England)	CBS/Paramount+	English language rights through 2030
Women's FA Cup	(England)	CBS/Paramount+	English language rights
FA Cup	(England)	ESPN	English and Spanish-language rights until 2027–28
FA Community Shield	(England)	ESPN	English and Spanish-language rights until 2027
FA Youth Cup	(England)	ESPN	English and Spanish-language rights
La Liga	(Spain)	ESPN	English and Spanish-language rights until 2029
Segunda División	(Spain)	ESPN	English and Spanish-language rights until 2029
Copa del Rey	(Spain)	ESPN	English and Spanish-language rights until 2027
Supercopa de España	(Spain)	ESPN	English and Spanish-language rights until 2027
Copa de la Reina	(Spain)	ESPN	English and Spanish-language rights until 2028
Supercopa de España Femenina	(Spain)	ESPN	English and Spanish-language rights until 2028
Bundesliga	(Germany)	USA Sports	English language rights until 2030–31; 30 matches live on USA and all matches available via Fandango streaming service
Bundesliga	(Germany)	Telemundo Deportes	Spanish language rights until 2028–29
2. Bundesliga	(Germany)	YouTube	
DFL-Supercup	(Germany)	USA Sports	English language rights until 2030
DFL-Supercup	(Germany)	Telemundo Deportes	Spanish language rights until 2028
3. Liga	(Germany)	ESPN	
DFB Pokal	(Germany)	DFB Play	English-language rights
Frauen-Bundesliga	(Germany)	DAZN	English-language rights
Serie A	(Italy)	CBS Sports/Paramount+	English-language rights until 2027
Serie A	(Italy)	Telemundo Deportes	Spanish-language rights until 2029
Coppa Italia	(Italy)	CBS Sports/Paramount+	English-language rights until 2027
Supercoppa Italiana	(Italy)	CBS Sports/Paramount+	English-language rights until 2027
Serie A Women	(Italy)	DAZN	English-language rights
Ligue 1	(France)	beIN Sports	English and Spanish-language rights until 2029
Ligue 2	(France)	beIN Sports	English and Spanish-language rights until 2029
Trophée des Champions	(France)	beIN Sports	English and Spanish-language rights until 2029
Coupe de France	(France)	Fox Sports	English and Spanish-language rights until 2026
Première Ligue	(France)	DAZN	English language rights

Other national competitions

- Liga FPD Costa Rica: Centroamerica TV
- Liga Nacional de Fútbol Profesional de Honduras: Centroamerica TV, Fox Deportes
- Liga Nacional de Fútbol de Guatemala: Fox Deportes
- Primera División de Fútbol de El Salvador: Centroamerica TV
- Campeonato Brasileiro Série A: Fanatiz (English, Portuguese)
- Copa do Brasil: Fox Deportes (Spanish) and Rede Globo (Portuguese)
- Campeonato Paulista: Rede Globo (Portuguese)
- Campeonato Carioca: Rede Globo (Portuguese)
- Campeonato Brasileiro de Futebol Feminino Série A1: Eleven Sports
- Primera División Argentina: Paramount+ (English), TyC Sports (Spanish)
- Categoría Primera A Colombia: RCN Nuestra Tele Internacional, ViX (Spanish)
- Uruguayan Primera División: Fubo TV
- Peruvian Primera División: Fanatiz
- Primeira Liga: beIN Sports (English and Spanish)
- Taça da Liga: Triller TV (English and Portuguese)
- Taça de Portugal: beIN Sports and RTP Internacional (Portuguese)
- Supertaça Cândido de Oliveira: beIN Sports (PPV) and RTP Internacional (Free via satellite) (Portuguese)
- Eredivisie: ESPN
- Dutch Cup: ESPN (English and Spanish)
- Johan Cruyff Shield: ESPN
- Belgian First Division A: DAZN
- Belgian Cup: DAZN
- Belgian Super Cup: DAZN
- Super League Greece: SportPlus TV, ANT1 Satellite
- Turkish Super Lig: beIN Sports
- Scottish Professional Football League: CBS Sports/Paramount+
- Scottish Cup: ESPN+
- Scottish League Cup: CBS Sports/Paramount+
- Scottish Challenge Cup:
- NIFL Premiership: OneFootball, Next Level Sports
- League of Ireland: WatchLOI.ie
- Allsvenskan: TBA
- Swedish Cup: B/R Live (final only)
- Damallsvenskan: Fanseat
- Danish Superliga: OneFootball, Next Level Sports
- Danish Cup: ESPN+
- Eliteserien: OneFootball, Next Level Sports
- Veikkausliiga: FloSports
- Úrvalsdeild karla: OneFootball, Next Level Sports
- Austrian Football Bundesliga: OneFootball
- Swiss Super League: SFL Play
- Swiss Cup: Cupplay.ch
- Ekstraklasa: beIN Sports
- Ukrainian Premier League: Eleven Sports Network
- Slovak Super Liga: OneFootball, Next Level Sports
- Latvian Higher League: OneFootball, Next Level Sports
- Kazakhstan Premier League: Youtube
- Euro Beach Soccer League: ESPN+
- A-League Men: ESPN3
- A-League Women: ESPN3
- Australia Cup: YouTube
- Indian Super League: YouTube
- J.League: YouTube
- K League 1: K League TV
- Persian Gulf Pro League: IRIB
- Saudi Pro League: Fox Sports
- Saudi King's Cup: Fox Sports
- Saudi Super Cup
- Uzbekistan Super League: Youtube
- New Zealand National League: FFA+
- Chatham Cup: FIFA+
- New Zealand Women's National League: FIFA+
- Kate Sheppard Cup: FIFA+

== Swimming ==
NBC Sports has rights to the following events with coverage varying on NBC and USA Network

- FINA World Aquatics Championships
- Pan Pacific Swimming Championships
- United States Swimming National Championships

== Tennis ==
Australian Open

- ESPN has the contract through 2031. Coverage is aired on ESPN, ESPN2, ESPN+ and ESPN3

French Open

- TNT Sports through 2034. Coverage is aired on TNT, truTV, and HBO Max.

Wimbledon

- ESPN has the contract through 2035. ABC airs live matches during the middle weekend beginning in 2022. Tennis Channel has rights to daily highlights through 2036 also provides coverage. Coverage is as follows:
  - Qualifying: ESPN+
  - Days 1–6: ESPN, ESPN+, and ESPN3
  - Day 7: ESPN, ESPN2, ESPN+, and ESPN3
  - Days 8 and 9: ESPN, ESPN2, ESPN+ and ESPN3
  - Days 10–13 including the ladies' and gentlemen's singles finals: ESPN, ESPN+ and ESPN3
  - Same-day replays are aired on Tennis Channel throughout the tournament through 2023. Live matches of the middle weekend air on ABC beginning in 2022. Same-day replays of the ladies' and gentlemen's singles finals are aired on ABC.

U.S. Open

- ESPN has the contract through 2037. Tennis Channel also provides coverage. Coverage is as follows:
  - Arthur Ashe Kids' Day: ABC
  - Days 1–5: ESPN, ESPN2, ESPN3, and ESPN+
  - Days 6–8: ESPN2, ESPN3, and ESPN+
  - Days 9–10: ESPN, ESPN2, ESPN3, and ESPN+
  - Day 11: women's singles semifinals: ESPN
  - Day 12: mixed doubles final: ESPN2, men's singles semifinals: ESPN
  - Day 13: men's doubles final: ESPN3, women's singles final: ESPN
  - Day 14: women's doubles final: ESPN3, men's singles final: ESPN
  - A daily preview show, same-day highlights and a daily wrap-up show are aired on Tennis Channel throughout the tournament.

ATP Finals

- Tennis Channel

ATP Tour Masters 1000

- Tennis Channel

ATP Tour 500

- Tennis Channel

ATP Tour 250

- Tennis Channel

WTA Finals

- Tennis Channel

WTA 1000 tournaments

- Tennis Channel

WTA 500 tournaments

- Tennis Channel

WTA 250 tournaments

- Tennis Channel

Davis Cup

- Tennis Channel

Billie Jean King Cup

- Tennis Channel

US Open Series

- Tennis Channel

Laver Cup

- Tennis Channel

Tie Break Tens

- Tennis Channel

== Track and field (athletics) ==
NBCUniversal holds rights to the following:

- World Athletics Championships
- World Athletics Indoor Championships
- World Athletics Cross Country Championships
- World Athletics U20 Championships
- World Athletics Relays
- USA Outdoor Track and Field Championships
- USA Track & Field Indoor Championships
- United States Olympic Trials

FloSports holds rights to the following:

- Diamond League
- World Athletics Indoor Tour Gold

== Winter sports ==
- U.S. Figure Skating Championships: NBC
- Alpine Skiing: NBC Sports
- Bobsledding: NBC Sports
- Burton US Open Snowboarding Championships: Fox Sports

== Wrestling ==
- WWE PPV events: ESPN
- WWE Raw: Netflix
- WWE SmackDown: USA Network
- WWE NXT: The CW
- AEW Dynamite: TBS & HBO Max
- AEW Collision: TNT & HBO Max
- TNA Impact!: AMC

== Miscellaneous ==
- X Games: ESPN and Facebook/YouTube
- Dew Tour: NBCSN and website
- World Weightlifting Championships: ESPN3
- Boston Marathon: ESPN
- New York City Marathon: ESPN
- New York City Half Marathon: ESPN
- London Marathon: FloSports
- Houston Marathon: ESPN
- Paris Marathon: Peacock
- America's Cup: ESPN
- World Series of Poker: ESPN
- World Table Tennis Championships: ESPN3
- ITTF World Tour: ESPN3
- Asian Cup Table Tennis Tournament: ESPN3
- European Badminton Championships: ESPN3
- Professional Darts Corporation:
  - PDC World Darts Championship: ESPN
  - World Matchplay: ESPN
  - Grand Slam of Darts: ESPN
  - World Grand Prix: ESPN
  - Premier League Darts:
- Professional Bowlers Association: CW Sports, CBS Sports Network, BowlTV
- Mosconi Cup: ESPN
- U.S. Open Pool Championship: ESPN
- Scripps National Spelling Bee: Bounce TV, Ion Television
- FIVB Volleyball Men's Nations League and FIVB Volleyball Women's Nations League: TBD
- Association of Volleyball Professionals: CBS Sports, CW Sports
- NCAA Beach Volleyball Championship: ESPN
- USA Volleyball College Beach Championship: NBCSN Olympic Channel
- Nathan's Hot Dog Eating Contest: ESPN
- World Men's Handball Championship: ESPN
- European Men's Handball Championship: beIN Sports
- Men's World Floorball Championship: beIN Sports
- Professional Bull Riders: CBS and CBS Sports
- Red Bull Cliff Diving World Series: ESPN+
- Australian Football League and AFL Women's: Fox Soccer Plus, Fox Sports 2, Fox Sports 1 (select games including the Grand Final) and all games on WatchAFL.
- USA Ultimate College Championships and Triple Crown Tour: ESPNU and ESPN3
- Super League Triathlon: ESPN3
- World Equestrian Games: NBC
- Wrestling World Cup and World Wrestling Championships: FloSports
- Olympic sports: Olympic Channel
- Association of Pickleball Players: ESPN, ESPN+, CBS Sports Network
- Professional Pickleball Association: CBS, CBS Sports Network, Paramount+
