= Copa América on United States television =

CONMEBOL Copa América, known until 1975 as the South American Football Championship (Campeonato Sudamericano de Fútbol in Spanish and Copa Sul-Americana de Futebol in Portuguese), is the main men's soccer tournament contested among national teams from CONMEBOL. It is the oldest international soccer competition. The competition determines the champion of South America. Since the 1990s, teams from North America and Asia have also been invited to participate.

== History ==
=== Early history on pay-per-view (1995-1999) ===
Matches in 1995 were only offered by Prime Network to Americans via pay-per-view or in closed-circuit theaters.

In 1997, seventeen out of 26 matches, including all elimination games, were offered through satellite distributors PrimeStar and Fox Sports Direct. The other eight first-round games and third-place match could be seen via satellite on Fox Sports Americas. The cost was $12.95 for each first-round game and $15.95 for each of the others. Commentary was made available both in English and Spanish.

Two years later, Fox Sports offered 17 games from Paraguay on pay-per-view at $15 per match or $100 for the whole tourney. The final however, between Brazil and Uruguay was made available on Fox Sports Español.

=== Univision, GOL TV, and Traffic Sports (2001-2011) ===
2001 saw a breakthrough when Univision and cable cousin Galavisión provided coverage of Copa América to broadcast television for the first time. Univision averaged 1.4 million viewers for their efforts. Univision was once again the exclusive American television home for the Copa in 2004, where the average improved slightly to 1.75 million.

GOL TV acquired the English-language rights for Copa América 2007. This came at the same time that the United States was making its first appearance in the tournament since 1995. Meanwhile, Univision's average audience grew again, to 2.5 million. Not only that, but they offered online streaming for the first time.

After ESPN tried and failed to acquire the 2011 Copa América English-language broadcasting rights for their then-nascent ESPN3 streaming service, Traffic Sports swooped in and put all the games on YouTube for free. While Univision's ratings fell from 2007, they still attracted 2 million-plus viewers for the semis and final.

=== beIN Sports and fuboTV (2015) ===
beIN served as Copa América's mainstream English-language home in 2015. This consequently, also took away Univision's Spanish-language rights. Univision, however, would return come Copa América Centenario one year later. fuboTV meanwhile, offered fans a chance to watch the tournament via streaming. fuboTV accounted for 50,000 subscribers. Unfortunately for beIN, they were only available 17 million homes at the time, which is only 14.6% of American TV households. Despite beIN's limited reach, they still managed to snag 1.5 million viewers for the final.

=== Fox Sports and Univision (2016) ===
Fox Sports beat out both ESPN and beIN for the English-language broadcasting rights to Copa América Centenario in 2016. This meant that the first time ever, most Americans had the ability to watch Copa América. Fox Sports made the matches available on FS1, FS2, FX, and the over-the-air Fox network. An average of 4 million viewers tuned in.

=== ESPN+ and Telemundo (2019) ===
In 2019, ESPN's streaming service ESPN+ acquired both the English-language and Portuguese-language rights for the 2019 Copa América. Telemundo meanwhile, Telemundo secured the Spanish-language U.S. TV rights.

=== Fox Sports and Univision (2021) ===
Univision through its sports programming division TUDN, retained Spanish-language rights for the 2021 edition. TUDN will make matches available on Galavisión and TUDN and on over-the-air Univision and UniMás. English-language rights return to Fox Sports after a six-year deal until 2026 that will allow them to air the next two championships.

== See also ==
- Sports broadcasting contracts in the United States § International competitions
