= UEFA Champions League on United States television =

Football competition

The UEFA Champions League (also known as the European Cup) is an annual club football competition organized by the Union of European Football Associations (UEFA) and contested by top-division European clubs, deciding the competition winners. The competition attracts an extensive television audience, not just in Europe, but throughout the world. The final of the tournament has been, in recent years, the most-watched annual sporting event in the world. The final of the 2012–13 tournament had the competition's highest TV ratings to date, drawing approximately 360 million television viewers.

== History ==
=== ESPN (1995–2009) ===
ESPN formerly had the rights of the UEFA Champions League between 1995–2009. Derek Rae and Tommy Smyth formed the lead broadcast team with the ESPN2 alternate team being Adrian Healey and Robbie Mustoe. The pre-match program was hosted by Andrew Orsatti.

=== Fox Sports (2009–2018) ===
Fox formerly aired the UEFA Champions League and the UEFA Europa League from 2009–2018. Fox Sports provided live coverage through May 2015. Fox Sports Media Group had the first, second, and third picks of live matches for each night of the competition. Different live matches would air on Fox Soccer, Fox Soccer Plus, Fox Deportes and regional Fox Sports Net affiliates, with rebroadcasts on Fox Soccer. DirecTV broadcasts all remaining matches during the playoff round and the group stage. Fox Soccer airs semifinal matches on Tuesdays and FX did the same on Wednesdays. The final is aired live free-to-air on Fox.

Rob Stone hosted UEFA Champions League coverage alongside a rotation of analysts including Warren Barton, Brad Friedel, Eric Wynalda, Stuart Holden, and Alexi Lalas. Lead broadcast team for non World-Feed broadcasts of UEFA Champions League from 2013–2014 was Gus Johnson and Eric Wynalda, until John Strong and Stuart Holden or Brad Friedel replaced them as lead commentator for the rest of the contract. Ian Joy or Kate Abdo hosted UEFA Europa League coverage alongside analysts Stuart Holden, Warren Barton, and Mario Melchiot. The lead broadcast team for Europa League coverage was Keith Costigan and Alexi Lalas. For World-Feed broadcasts, Tony Jones and David Pleat called both UEFA Champions League Final and UEFA Europa League Final.

=== Turner Sports (2018–2020) ===
In 2017, Turner Sports announced that they had retained the rights to air all of the matches from the UEFA Champions League live. The contract originally runs from 2018–2021. Turner later announced that they would air 4 matches per week on TNT and the remainder of the matches on new streaming service B/R Live. All matches would be commentated through world feed.

=== TUDN (2018–2027) ===
In January 2016, Univision and TUDN, formerly known as Univision Deportes, acquired Spanish-language rights to UEFA tournaments beginning in 2018, including UEFA Euro 2020, UEFA Euro 2024 and the UEFA Nations League. In 2017, Univision acquired Spanish-language rights to the UEFA Champions League and Europa League beginning in 2018-19. All UEFA competition matches regularly air across Univision, UniMás, Galavisión, and TUDN.

=== CBS Sports (2020–2030) ===
Originally the UEFA Champions League, UEFA Europa League, and UEFA Super Cup would've aired on CBS Sports networks starting from the 2021–22 seasons, but Turner Sports opted out of the rest of its contract after airing most matches in the round of 16 for the 2019–20 season. In response, CBS extended its contract to start one and half (one for UEFA Super Cup) seasons earlier beginning with the remaining round of 16 matches and the quarter finals in 2019–20 season. On August 19, 2022, CBS extended their rights 2030, beating out a deal from Prime Video.

== See also ==
- List of UEFA Champions League broadcasters
- Sports broadcasting contracts in the United States#International competitions
