= Shoulder programming =

Shoulder programming is a type of pre-event and post-event broadcast programming as a companion to live sporting events. This type of programming may be multi-platform and include both television and radio programs. Due to exclusive content or access, it may be included in a broadcast rights package for a particular sport or event. The purpose is to expand revenue opportunities through radio or television advertising or increased exposure to a pay-per-view event.

== Examples ==
=== NFL ===
NFL Primetime, Monday Night Countdown, and SportsCenter Monday Kickoff have each been companion National Football League (NFL) programming for Monday Night Football on ESPN. Monday Night Football was highly rated on ABC from 1970 to 2005, but since ESPN took over in 2006, it could more directly surround the franchise with programming in the time-slots before and after the game.

=== UFC ===
The first Ultimate Fighting Championship (UFC) event on UFC on Fox was a title card between Junior dos Santos and Cain Velasquez in 2011. Networks such as Fox Deportes, Fuel TV (since re-branded Fox Sports 2) and Fox Sports Radio broadcast many hours of programming leading up to and during the fight. Programming included specials by both Fox Deportes and Fuel TV. Replays of the previously-held Velasquez vs Lesnar fight and the weigh-in were aired by Fox Deportes and Fuel TV, respectively. Live radio coverage of the fight was broadcast by Fox Sports Radio. Other programming included a UFC primetime special and the pre-fight and post-fight shows by Fuel TV.

== Criticism ==
ESPN has been criticized for devoting more or less air-time to a sport depending on whether it has rights to the primary organization or league of that sport. Examples include less air-time for National Hockey League (NHL), including the cancellation of NHL 2Night following their expiration of ESPN's rights contract and expanding air-time for NASCAR and the Arena Football League following rights deals.
