= Premier League on United States television =

The Premier League is the most-watched football league in the world, broadcast in 212 territories to 643 million homes and a potential TV audience of 4.7 billion people. The Premier League is broadcast in the United States through NBC Sports. Premier League viewership has increased rapidly, with NBC and NBCSN averaging a record 479,000 viewers in the 2014–15 season, up 118% from 2012–13 when coverage still aired on Fox Soccer and ESPN/ESPN2 (220,000 viewers), and NBC Sports has been widely praised for its coverage. NBC Sports reached a six-year extension with the Premier League in 2015 to broadcast the league through the 2021–22 season in a deal valued at $1 billion (£640 million).

== Early history ==
The English Football League, founded in 1888, is the oldest such competition in world soccer. It was the top-level soccer league in England from its foundation until 1992, when the top 22 clubs split away to form the Premier League.

=== PBS (1978-1983) ===
Beginning in 1978, highlights of select games were broadcast on PBS under the title All Star Soccer with Mario Machado providing the commentary. For the 1980-81 league season, Star Soccer switched from Mario Machado and used the ITV feed with commentary from Brian Moore.

=== Trans-Atlantic Challenge Cup (1980) ===
In 1980, the first ever Trans-Atlantic Challenge Cup, a friendly soccer competition that was hosted by the New York Cosmos, of the original North American Soccer League took place. The Trans-Atlantic Cup featured teams from Europe competing against teams from North America. Manchester City's matches against the New York Cosmos and Vancouver Whitecaps were televised on American television.

=== FNN/SCORE (1987) ===
The 1987 FA Cup Final between Tottenham Hotspur and Coventry City was televised by FNN/SCORE on tape delay.

=== English Soccer (1990-1992) ===
During the 1990-91 and 1991-92 seasons, Jim Rosenthal hosted English Soccer, which was broadcast on regional sports networks across the United States. The format of English Soccer was similar in that to BBC's Match of the Day, where the majority of the highlights were focused on the biggest game of the week, and a shorter amount of time was given to showing the goal highlights from the other matches.

== Since 1992 ==
=== SportsChannel America and Prime Network (1992-1996) ===
Prime Network was one of the first media companies to purchase the U.S. rights to overseas soccer leagues. When the Premier League officially launched in August 1992, Prime provided a match of the week on a delayed basis. The matches were also edited and condensed to 90 minutes (with commercial breaks). Meanwhile, around this same time, SportsChannel America aired a 1-hour weekly highlights package on Friday nights.

Prime Network later provided live coverage of the 1995 English FA Cup Final (Everton-Manchester United), with JP Dellacamera and Ty Keough hosting the pre-game, half-time, and post-game "wraps" from Houston's Liberty SportsComm studio.

=== ESPN (1996–1998; 2009–2013) ===
ESPN2 formerly aired matches from the Premier League between 1996 and 1998, and then from 2009 to 2013. On tape delay in 1981, ESPN had initially shown select games. From 2010 to 2013, ESPN2 had its own commentary team of Ian Darke and Steve McManaman, with Darrell Currie, Dave Beckett, or Alicia Ferguson reporting pitchside live in England. On occasion, the network would simulcast ESPN UK's coverage with full studio coverage from host Ray Stubbs or Rebecca Lowe and commentary from Jon Champion and Chris Waddle. In the U.S., ESPN's studio team was host Andrew Orsatti or Georgie Bingham with analyst Robbie Mustoe.

=== Fox Sports (1998–2013) ===
Fox Soccer aired the English Premier League from 1998 to 2013. At the start of the season, Fox Sports Net or Fox Sports World broadcast weekly highlights from Premier League matches, with Lionel Bienvenu hosting the show. Meanwhile, the live match broadcast is broadcast on a pay-per-view basis through several providers. Later, Fox Soccer aired live and tape-delayed matches each week, plus weekly magazine (Premier League World), preview (Premier League Preview Show, and Matchday) and recap (Premier League Review and Goals on Sunday) shows. Besides matches on Fox Soccer, Fox Deportes and Fox Soccer Plus, up to 3 matches each season were available live free-to-air on Fox. Up to 74 matches each season were sublicensed to ESPN, Inc. Contract ran through May 2013, at which point coverage went to NBC Sports/NBCSN to the present day. In the later years of their coverage, Fox had a studio pregame show first hosted by Christian Miles until 2011, then by Rob Stone. Studio analysts were Warren Barton, Eric Wynalda, Brian McBride, and Keith Costigan. Commentary was provided by former corporate sibling Sky Sports.

America One syndicated many of these broadcasts to various regional sports networks in the United States (usually, those not part of the Fox Sports Net family). America One also carried tape-delayed broadcasts of the English Premier League, specifically Bolton Wanderers and Everton.

=== NBC Sports (2013–present) ===
NBC acquired rights to the Premier League in 2013, replacing Fox Sports and ESPN. NBC's studio programming for the league includes the pre-match show Premier League Live, and the highlights shows Premier League Goal Zone and Match of the Day (modeled upon the similar BBC series). NBC Sports president of programming Jon Miller explained that their main goal was to not "Americanize" their coverage (besides providing explanations of terminology unfamiliar to U.S. viewers, such as derbies), citing their decision to employ talent (such as former ESPN UK and BBC Sport presenter Rebecca Lowe, who became NBC's lead host) who "know the Premier League and can talk about it intelligently". In 2014, NBC also hired the duo of Michael Davies and Roger Bennett—the "Men in Blazers"—to provide soccer-oriented content across NBC Sports' platforms. NBC renewed its Premier League rights in 2021, extending its contract until the end of the 2027–28 season.

During larger matchdays, NBCSN operated pop-up channels branded as Premier League Extra Time, which broadcast overflow matches not shown by other NBC networks. However, in 2017, NBC began to paywall many of these overflow games behind the "Premier League Pass" service on NBC Sports Gold. Premier League Pass was in turn phased out in 2020, with its Premier League content transferred to the newly launched Peacock streaming service; Premier League games broadcast on the main NBC network would be simulcast on the service starting the next year. On Survival Sunday, the majority of NBCUniversal's cable networks carry games, including several networks not normally dedicated to sports.

== See also ==
- List of Premier League broadcasters § North American and Caribbean broadcasters
- English football on television § United States
- Premier League § Worldwide
- Sports broadcasting contracts in the United States § National competitions
