= Women's Professional Soccer on television =

Women's Professional Soccer (WPS) was the top level professional women's soccer league in the United States. It began play on March 29, 2009. The league was composed of seven teams for its first two seasons and fielded six teams for the 2011 season, with continued plans for future expansion. The WPS was the highest level in the United States soccer pyramid for the women's game.

On January 30, 2012, the league announced suspension of the 2012 season, citing several internal organization struggles as the primary cause. Some of these issues included an ongoing legal battle with magicJack owner Dan Borislow and the lack of resources invested into the league. On May 18, 2012 WPS announced the league folded and would not return in 2013. After the WPS folded, the National Women's Soccer League formed in 2013 and took WPS's place as the top professional women's soccer league.

== Television coverage ==
Fox Soccer Channel and Fox Sports en Español with Samuel Jacobo and Jorge Caamaño aired weekly Sunday night matches and the WPS All-Star Game. Fox Sports Net aired the semifinal and league championship contests. The national television contract was in effect through the 2011 season with an option for 2012. Some local networks aired games.

=== Fox Soccer Channel ===
On March 18, 2009, Fox Soccer Channel announced that Mark Rogondino would handling play-by-play responsibilities and Jenn Hildreth providing color commentary for their 20-match 2009 regular season package on Sunday evenings beginning at 6 p.m. ET. The inaugural telecast on March 29, 2009 featured the Los Angeles Sol hosting the Washington Freedom at the Home Depot Center in Carson, California. WPS All-Star Game and playoff coverage meanwhile, would be split between Fox Soccer Channel and Fox Sports Net's owned and affiliated regional sports networks.

The final weeks of the 2009 WPS season produced over 100,000 viewers for Fox Soccer Channel's showcase games. In total, the WPS average a 0.1 rating for the 2009 season on Fox Soccer Channel, which was the same average that Major League Soccer had on that network. This translated 32,000 households on Fox Soccer Channel and 100,000 households for Fox Sports Net.

The 2010 WPS Playoffs followed the same format used during the 2009 season with the No. 3 seed hosting the No. in the WPS First Round featured nationally on Fox Sports Net. The No. 2 seed would host the winner of the WPS First Round in the WPS Super Semifinal on Fox Soccer Channel. As the No. 1 seed, the winner of the regular season would play host to the winner of the Super Semifinal in the 2010 WPS Championship, broadcast nationally on Fox Sports Net.

In 2011, Fox Soccer Channel added Allen Hopkins to their commentator roster. Hopkins would eventually handle play-by-play duties for that year's WPS Final alongside Jenn Hildreth. Fox Soccer Channel also enlisted the play-by-play services of Dean Linke.

=== Comcast SportsNet ===
On June 11, 2010, Women's Professional Soccer and Comcast Sports Group Networks announced an agreement for the latter to air up to 27 WPS games (either live or on tape delay) in regional markets throughout the summer of 2010. Regional Comcast networks were available in each of the seven WPS markets: Comcast SportsNet New England for the Boston Breakers; Comcast SportsNet Philadelphia/The Comcast Network for both the Philadelphia Independence and Sky Blue FC; Comcast SportsNet Mid-Atlantic for the Washington Freedom; CSS for the Atlanta Beat; Comcast SportsNet Chicago for the Chicago Red Stars; and Comcast SportsNet Bay Area for the FC Gold Pride.

== WPS Championship broadcasters ==
Year	Network	Play-by-play	Color commentator(s)	Touchline reporter
2011	Fox Sports Net	Allen Hopkins	Jenn Hildreth	Karina LeBlanc
2010	Fox Sports Net	Mark Rogondino	Jenn Hildreth	Leslie Osborne
2009	Fox Sports Net	Mark Rogondino	Jenn Hildreth	

== See also ==
- Women's United Soccer Association on television
- National Women's Soccer League on television
