= Jacqui Oatley =

English broadcaster

Jacqui Oatley MBE
- Born: Jacqueline Anne Oatley; 28 December 1974 (age 51); Wolverhampton, West Midlands, England
- Education: St Dominic's, Brewood; Wolverhampton Grammar School
- Alma mater: University of Leeds; Sheffield Hallam University
- Occupation: Broadcaster
- Years active: 2002–present
- Employer: Freelance
- Known for: Sports presenting and commentating
- Spouse: Jamie
- Children: 2

Jacqueline Anne Oatley MBE (born 28 December 1974) is an English broadcaster who works as a football commentator for TNT Sports UK and other broadcasters, calling games at the FIFA World Cup, Premier League, FA Women's Super League, UEFA Champions League, NWSL and UEFA international matches. She was also a sports presenter on Quest TV covering the English Football League, a podcast host for The Athletic, and is current anchor for ITV Sport's live darts coverage. In 2007, she became the first female commentator on the flagship BBC One football highlights programme Match of the Day, which she also presented once in March 2015.

In August 2015, Oatley was named the eighth most influential woman in sport by The Independent.

== Early life ==
Oatley was born in Wolverhampton on 28 December 1974. She was brought up in Codsall, South Staffordshire. Her late father Gerald was the managing director of a large gas appliance company, and her mother Sonja is a retired nurse who was born and brought up in South Africa, where her parents were Dutch missionaries.

=== Education ===
In her childhood, Oatley developed a love of watching and playing football. She attended the all-girls junior school, St Dominic's in Brewood, Staffordshire. Oatley passed her A-Levels at Wolverhampton Grammar School, and studied at University of Leeds, graduating with a degree in German in 1996.

Oatley spent a year travelling the world, and then moved to London to work in intellectual property as a sales and marketing manager, then key account manager. While playing amateur football for Chiswick Ladies Football Club, Oatley sustained a dislocated knee cap and ruptured ligaments, which resulted in a reconstruction operation and ten months recovering on crutches. With further operations to follow, she was told she would no longer be able to play sport. That news prompted her decision to change career and train to become a journalist, with the aim of working in sport, particularly football.

== Journalism career ==
Oatley initially studied print journalism and radio production at evening classes while broadcasting on hospital radio. She then gave up her intellectual property management job as well as her flat, spent a summer sleeping on friends' floors whilst doing journalism work experience full-time. She undertook a Postgraduate Diploma (PgDip) in Broadcast Journalism at Sheffield Hallam University. While studying she joined BBC Radio Leeds as a sports reporter, continuing to work there after graduation. Her first commentary was on a match between Wakefield & Emley and Worksop Town in the Unibond League.

Oatley also worked as a news reporter in her native West Midlands with BBC Radio WM, before moving back to London to work as a sports reporter for BBC London 94.9.

=== Football commentary ===
She joined BBC Radio 5 Live in 2003 and became the first woman to commentate on a football match on British network radio in 2005, covering the England women's internationals at the 2005 UEFA Women's Championship. Her subsequent interview with UEFA President Lennart Johansson became an international news story due to his controversial comments on women's football.

Oatley became the first female football commentator in the history of BBC football programme Match of the Day, with her debut broadcast on 21 April 2007 for the Premier League match between Fulham and Blackburn Rovers. She has since commentated on several further games for Match of the Day.

In September 2009, she commentated on the UEFA Women's Euro 2009 final between Germany and England. She provided live commentary on BBC Radio 5 Live for matches of the 2010 FIFA World Cup in South Africa. She was one of BBC Television's reporters with the Great Britain women's Olympic football team for the 2012 Summer Olympics.

Oatley resumed her association football play-by-play commentary career in 2019 when she commentated seven 2019 FIFA Women's World Cup matches for the Host Broadcast Services (HBS) "world feed" on-site from Roazhon Park in Rennes, France.

Oatley became the lead play-by-play commentator for FA Women's Super League (WSL) matches on Sky Sports in the UK in September 2021. She stepped down from that role at the end of the 2022-2023 WSL season in May 2023 after she was hired by CBS Sports (USA) as the lead television main commentator (play-by-play) for the NWSL in March 2023.

In 2022, Fox Sports hired Oatley as a main play-by-play commentator for United States broadcasts of the 2022 FIFA World Cup, becoming the first woman to serve in that role for the tournament's U.S. broadcast.

In March 2023, Oatley joined the play-by-play commentary team for the National Women's Soccer League on television in the United States, commuting for the role from Surrey.

In May 2024, Fox Sports hired Oatley as one of four lead commentators for the UEFA Euro 2024 tournament.

=== Presenting and reporting ===
Oatley has presented sports news on BBC Radio 1, BBC Radio 2 and BBC Radio 4, as well as more frequently on BBC Radio 5 Live. She has covered the World Snooker Championship, British Moto GP, Open Championship golf, and various other sports such as tennis and rugby league.

Oatley presented and commentated for the children's television show Level Up during the 2006 FIFA World Cup in Germany and reported for BBC Television at the 2007 FIFA Women's World Cup in China. She commentated on live football matches for BBC Television during the 2008 Summer Olympics in Beijing.

She was a regular sports presenter on the BBC News Channel between 2011 and 2013, fronted The FA WSL Show in 2012 for ESPN (UK), and anchored the BBC's live women's football coverage, including the UEFA Women's Euro 2013, 2015 FIFA Women's World Cup, and Women's Football Show on BBC in 2015. In 2013 and 2014 Oatley also hosted Late Kick Off on BBC One in London and the South East, and was a reporter on Football Focus and Final Score on BBC One and a Premier League presenter on their worldwide television channel, produced by IMG.

She has also fronted The Football League Show, completing the set of five broadcast roles on the show, and World Football Focus. She has been the darts anchor for ITV Sport since 2015, hosting their live international PDC events. She had previously presented ITV's 2015 Africa Cup of Nations coverage and in 2014 anchored their FA Cup highlights programmes. She has been a studio guest pundit on TV2 in Norway and The Guardian's Football Weekly podcast.

Oatley hosted coverage of matches and highlights for UEFA Euro 2016 and the 2018 FIFA World Cup for ITV Sport as a main studio presenter and pitchside reporter, and was a live match commentator for the host broadcaster's world TV feed on-site at the 2019 FIFA Women's World Cup in France.

Oatley appeared regularly on Sky Sports programming as a match reporter on Soccer Saturday and has stand-in presented Goals on Sunday and Sunday Supplement, where she took over from Neil Ashton on 14 January 2020 until the show was cancelled following the COVID-19 lockdown.

In the summer of 2021, she co-hosted the BBC Radio 5 Live 5 Live Drive news show with Tony Livesey.

=== Honours ===
She was appointed Member of the Order of the British Empire (MBE) in the 2016 New Year Honours for services to broadcasting and diversity in sport. The award was recognition of her work behind the scenes championing the role of women working in football as well as women's football. In September 2016, Oatley was made an Honorary Doctor of Letters at the University of Wolverhampton for her contribution to sports broadcasting.

== Personal life ==
Oatley is married to Jamie. They live in Surrey. She gave birth to daughter Phoebe in 2011 and son Max in 2014. Her cousin in South Africa was a Proteas cricket selector, while his brother was a rally driver who twice won the Roof of Africa.
