= National Women's Soccer League on television =

Professional women's soccer league

The National Women's Soccer League (NWSL) is a professional women's soccer league owned by the teams, and under a management contract with the United States Soccer Federation. At the top of the United States league system, it represents the sport's highest level in the United States. The NWSL was established in 2012 as a successor to Women's Professional Soccer (2007–2012), which was itself the successor to Women's United Soccer Association (2001–2003). The league began play in 2013 with eight teams, four of which were former members of Women's Professional Soccer (Chicago Red Stars, Boston Breakers, Sky Blue FC, Western New York Flash).

== Television coverage ==
During the 2013–2016 seasons, the majority of league games were available for viewing via YouTube or via individual team's websites. Of the eight teams in the league during the inaugural season, the Boston Breakers were the only team that charged a fee for access to their broadcasts.

=== Fox Sports 2 (2013) ===
On April 18, 2013, NWSL signed a one-year agreement with Fox Sports 2 to televise six regular season games, the semifinal, and championship games. All eight teams would appear on FS2 at least once and all six regular season games.

The commentators that FS2 employed during this time included Steve Cangialosi (play-by-play) and Kyndra de St. Aubin (color commentary).

=== ESPN2 and ESPN3 (2014) ===
On May 28, 2014, the NWSL signed a one-year agreement with ESPN to televise nine games of the 2014 NWSL season. The matches included three regular season and three playoff matches on ESPN2, as well as 3 regular season games live-streamed on ESPN3.

Only six of the nine teams were guaranteed to appear in the broadcast matches, with the Major League Soccer-partnered Houston Dash and Portland Thorns each appearing three times. The Seattle Reign would appear on two of three ESPN3 games and Sky Blue FC would appear once on ESPN2 and ESPN3. The Boston Breakers and Western New York Flash would each appear once on ESPN2, with the Chicago Red Stars, FC Kansas City and Washington Spirit being shut out from regular-season matches. ESPN2's the viewership average for their package of NWSL games was 144,000.

Glenn Davis provided the play-by-play with Mónica González providing analysis.

=== FS1 and Fox Sports Go (2015–2016) ===
On June 30, 2015, the NWSL announced a one-year agreement with Fox Sports once more to cover ten matches. Three regular season and three playoff matches were televised on FS1, and four live-streamed on Fox Sports Go. The agreement was extended into 2016 under another one-year contract, covering three regular season matches and the three playoff matches, once again on FS1. Consequently, no game aired for more than a month after the end of the World Cup, and just six matches, total, reached televisions.

The 2015 NWSL final between drew 167,000 viewers on Fox Sports 1. That was up 7% from the same matchup on ESPN2 the previously year (156K) and up nearly 2,000% from 2013 final on Fox Sports 2 (8K).

On April 14, 2016, NWSL and Fox Sports announced a one-year agreement to telecast six NWSL games for the second consecutive season. The agreement called for FS1 to air three regular-season matches (beginning on September 7, 2016, with a match-up between the Chicago Red Stars and FC Kansas City) and all three games of the NWSL Playoffs, which includes the semifinals and final. All six games would also stream live on FOX Soccer 2Go, FOX Sports GO, and FOXSportsGO.com. The Orlando Pride were not one of the three regular-season matches included in the deal, and would have to be one of four playoff teams to make it on national television.

The broadcast teams that Fox Sports employed this time included:

1. Jenn Hildreth (play-by-play) and Kyndra de St. Aubin (color commentary)
2. Mark Rogondino (play-by-play) and Aly Wagner (color commentary)

=== Lifetime and ESPNews (2017–2018) ===
On February 2, 2017, the NWSL announced a three-year agreement with A&E Networks, in which the Lifetime network broadcast 22 regular-season matches as the NWSL Game of the Week at 4 p.m. Eastern time on Saturday afternoons, as well as three post-season matches. This marked the first time that the NWSL had a weekly broadcast window throughout the entire season. As part of the deal, A&E Networks purchased a 25% equity stake in the NWSL and were granted two seats on the league's board. The company also formed a joint venture with the league known as NWSL Media to oversee the league's marketing and broadcast rights, and Lifetime became a league-wide kit sponsor for all players. This deal marked the first time Lifetime had broadcast sports since the WNBA in the late 1990s and early 2000s.

Lifetime's broadcasts featured play-by-play announcer Jenn Hildreth, analyst Aly Wagner, host and sideline reporter Dalen Cuff as well as select appearances by analyst and sideline reporter Kate Markgraf.

Lifetime also streamed the game of the week in the United States via its website, and internationally in the NWSL website and iOS app. The remaining games were initially streamed exclusively by go90 in the United States under a digital rights deal with Verizon Communications, and through the NWSL website internationally. The quality of the streams through go90 faced criticism, with sportswriters, users, and players and team staff criticizing the service for its inconsistent quality and arguing that the NWSL's growth could be harmed by go90's relative lack of reach and prominence when compared to YouTube. The Equalizer noted that the app was prone to crashing, did not have the same wide device support as YouTube, and that the telecasts themselves suffered from their own technical problems (such as poor camera angles and glitches with graphics), but that the streams were good when they worked. On May 19, 2017, the league announced that they would additionally stream games on the NWSL website and app in the U.S. until the technical issues with go90 were rectified.

After Houston Dash player Rachel Daly collapsed on the pitch after a match in Houston, on May 27 – where the heat index was reportedly over 100 degrees Fahrenheit – she was carried off on a stretcher and hospitalized for heat illness. League operations director Amanda Duffy subsequently announced that the NWSL Game of the Week matches, many of which were slated for the hottest parts of the day in humid cities such as Houston, Orlando, and Cary, North Carolina, would be rescheduled to allow for longer hydration breaks. Some Game of the Week matches changed to other venues, and teams not scheduled for television were granted more flexibility in rescheduling kickoffs for player safety. The league also adopted new procedures for addressing heat and rescheduling matches.

On June 6, 2018, it was announced that six Game of the Week matches through the remainder of the season would move to evening kickoffs and air on ESPNews (which is owned by a sister venture to A&E Networks), in an effort to ensure the safety of players, as well as improve attendance. Go90 shut down in July 2018; the remaining games not aired on television were moved back to the NWSL website for the remainder of the regular season and playoffs.

Since ESPNNews was generally included in a higher-tier cable package as compared to Lifetime, this made the channel less accessible to the average viewer. Fans not watching on television would be able to stream the games live via the ESPN App, but they would need to be ESPNews subscribers to do that as authentication is required in the U.S. This could have potentially led to lower viewership numbers for the games broadcast on ESPNews.

=== ESPNews and ESPN2 (2019) ===
On February 20, 2019, the NWSL announced that A&E Networks had pulled out of its broadcasting agreement with the league one season early. A&E's stake in NWSL Media was given back to the league, but Lifetime would remain a kit sponsor. NWSL president Amanda Duffy said the changes would give the league and its teams finer control over its media and sponsorship agreements, and expected to announce a new television rights deal soon. Verizon Media remained the U.S. digital rightsholder to the league, but the streams moved from go90 to the Yahoo! Sports website and apps.

The NWSL did not reach any national television deals before the start of the 2019 season, but after their opening match, the Chicago Red Stars reached their own television deal with the regional sports network NBC Sports Chicago. In July 2019, the NWSL announced that ESPN had acquired a 14-match package for the remainder of the season divided among ESPNews and ESPN2, including the semifinals and championship match. Eight matches would air on ESPNEWS, and the remaining six, including the two semifinals and the championship, would air on ESPN2.

The 2019 playoffs on ESPN2 averaged 148,000 viewers overall, up 66 percent from 2018. That year's championship game between the North Carolina Courage and Chicago Red Stars was seen by an average audience of 166,000 viewers on ESPN2, making it the most-watched NWSL match in three years. The audience was 43 percent higher than the 2018 Final and the NWSL's best audience since the 2016 Final (Western New York vs. Washington, 180,000 viewers). The 2019 NWSL season finished with an average of 81,000 viewers across ESPN networks, up 7 percent year-over-year. The 2019 NWSL season on ESPN networks also made its biggest year-over-year gains among viewers 18–49 with an average of 37,000 viewers, a 32 percent increase over the previous year.

ESPN's broadcast talent line-up included Aly Wagner (color commentary), Jenn Hildreth (play-by-play), Angela Hucles (color commentary), Glenn Davis (play-by-play), Marisa Pilla (sideline reporter), and Dalen Cuff (play-by-play and sideline reporter).

=== CBS Sports and Twitch (2020–2022) ===
In October 2019, the NWSL signed the agency Octagon to market its media rights. It was reported that Octagon was pursuing multi-year agreements of at least three years and stronger broadcaster commitments, as to help build an audience and discourage broadcasters from acquiring NWSL rights to ride the coattails of the U.S. national team and the FIFA Women's World Cup, but then "abandon" it afterward.

On March 11, 2020, the NWSL announced that it has entered into a three-year media agreement with CBS Sports and the video game-oriented streaming service Twitch, for a reported $4.5M rights fee to the NWSL over those 3 years. For the 2020 NWSL season, CBS Sports will broadcast 87 matches (including the playoffs) split between CBS, CBS Sports Network, and CBS All Access in Canada and the United States, with the exact distribution among the channels subject to change, while Twitch will stream an additional 24 matches for free. Twitch will also become the NWSL's international media rights holder and stream all matches outside Canada and the United States for free. This marked the first time that CBS Sports would broadcast any major professional soccer on U.S. television since the North American Soccer League (NASL) in 1976. However, actual production responsibilities would not be handled by CBS Sports, but National Women's Soccer League itself. This broadcasting arrangement is similar to a brokered deal or a time-buy.

Coverage of the 2020 NWSL season was scheduled to begin on Saturday, April 18 at 1 p.m. ET on CBS and CBS All Access with coverage of the OL Reign taking on the Washington Spirit. That was supposed to be followed by a rematch of previous year's championship game between the Chicago Red Stars and the North Carolina Courage at 7 p.m. ET on Twitch. On March 12, 2020, the preseason match schedule was cancelled due to the coronavirus pandemic. As a result, the NWSL announced on March 20 that the regular season start cancelled.

And then on June 16, 2020, the National Women's Soccer League announced that CBS would air the opening match of the 2020 NWSL Challenge Cup between back-to-back champions North Carolina Courage and Portland Thorns FC on June 27 at 10:30 a.m. MT (12:30 p.m. ET). The CBS broadcast coverage of the opening match would also stream live on CBS All Access, and opening day would continue with a matchup between the Orlando Pride and Chicago Red Stars on CBS All Access at 8 p.m. MT (10 p.m. ET).

The opening match would be covered by play-by-play announcer Jenn Hildreth and analyst Aly Wagner, with games 2 through 22 called by play-by-play announcer Mike Watts and analyst Lori Lindsey. Josh Tolle and Jenn Cooper would broadcast all other matches on Twitch for viewers outside the U.S. and Canada. Marisa Pilla would serve as the tournament's on-field reporter.

For the 2021 NWSL Championship Game on November 20, CBS aired the game live while Paramount+ (formally CBS All Access) would stream it live on their service. Meanwhile, the NWSL's Twitch channel would stream the game internationally. Jenn Hildreth once again provided the play-by-play alongside Aly Wagner with Marisa Pilla and Lori Lindsey reporting from the sidelines.

=== CBS Sports, TSN, DAZN, Tigo, and Endeavor (2023) ===
The league's partnership with Twitch expired after the 2022 season, and the league declined to renew it, instead contracting Endeavor Streaming to operate an international streaming service for the league, while three international broadcast partners acquired broadcast rights for their territories:

- The Sports Network acquired broadcast rights in Canada for TSN and TSN+.
- DAZN acquired non-exclusive broadcast rights for Brazil, Japan, Spain, Italy, Germany, Austria, Switzerland, UK, France, Belgium, Portugal, Norway, Denmark, Sweden, and the Netherlands.
- Tigo acquired non-exclusive broadcast rights for Costa Rica, El Salvador, Guatemala, Honduras, Nicaragua, and Panama.

On June 6, 2023, Tigo also added free Spanish-language streams of two regular-season NWSL matches per week, the NWSL Challenge Cup playoffs, and NWSL playoffs in the United States and Canada.

CBS Sports remained the league's broadcast partner through 2023, but did not extend a deal with the league prior to the end of its period of exclusive negotiations in 2022. CBS continued to air limited matches on over-the-air CBS broadcast and CBS Sports Network, with most matches still streamed on the paid Paramount+ service. Upon the launch of the free soccer-focused CBS Sports Golazo Network service, CBS announced that a limited schedule of NWSL matches would also be streamed there.

The league announced a broadcast crew that included Jacqui Oatley, Lori Lindsey, and Lianne Sanderson for nationally broadcast matches, and Jill Loyden, Tony Meola, Kate Scott, and Saskia Webber for broadcasts on CBS Sports Network and matches streamed on Paramount+.

Play-by-play announcers included JP Dellacamera, Josh Eastern, Jenn Hildreth, Joe Malfa, Maura Sheridan, Jamie Watson, and Mike Watts, with Jordan Angeli and Gary Bailey on color commentary.

=== 2024–2025: CBS, Amazon, ESPN, Ion, and NWSL+ ===
On November 9, 2023, the NWSL announced multi-year deals with CBS Sports, ESPN, Amazon Prime Video, and Scripps Sports, reported to be valued in total at around $60 million per-season (in comparison to the roughly $1.5 million paid by CBS under the previous agreement).

- On CBS and streaming on Paramount+, CBS Sports will air at least 10 regular season matches, one quarter-final, one semi-final, and the championship. Eight matches will air exclusively on CBS Sports Network.
- Amazon Prime Video will stream the season opening match, 25 regular season matches on Friday nights, and one quarter-final.
- ESPN will air 17 regular season matches, two quarter-finals, and one semi-final on ESPN, ESPN2, or ABC, and streaming on ESPN+.
- Ion Television will air 50 regular season matches per-season, consisting of primetime doubleheaders on Saturday nights.
- The remaining matches not covered by these contracts are streamed for free on the league-owned NWSL+ streaming service. NWSL+ also streams all matches live for viewers outside the United States. and offers replays of some matches after a 24-hour embargo period. Individual teams also have the option to sell the rights to these matches to regional sports networks or broadcast stations in their local markets, though the NWSL+ stream is not blacked out.

=== 2026-present: CBS, Amazon, ESPN, ION, Victory+, NWSL+ and Roku ===
On September 16, 2025, the NWSL announced revised agreements with ESPN and CBS Sports, and a new streaming agreement with Victory+. Agreements with Prime Video and Ion are unchanged. On July 30, 2026, due to missed rights payments, the NWSL terminated their agreement with Victory+, with all remaining matches moved to NWSL+ starting August 2. On August 26, 2026, the NWSL would sign a deal with Roku to air the remaining 8 Sunday night matches in 2026 and all Sunday night matches in 2027 on The Roku Channel.

- ESPN will expand its agreement to air 33 regular season matches, up from 17 in the original agreement, including all 8 Decision Day matches.
- CBS Sports Network will now air 20 regular season matches, while five other regular season matches can air on any CBS Sports platform.
- Victory+ would have aired 57 matches, 25 of which would be on Sunday nights.
- NWSL+ will air 40 matches alongside all but 8 matches that would have aired on Victory+.
- The Roku Channel will air the remaining Sunday night matches in 2026 and 25 matches on Sunday nights in 2027.

== List of broadcasters ==
=== Regional broadcasters ===
Team	Network(s)	Notes/Source
Angel City FC	FanDuel Sports Network SoCal	
Bay FC	NBC Sports Bay Area/NBC Sports California (10 matches)	
Chicago Red Stars	WFLD-TV (8 matches); Marquee Sports Network (reruns)	
Houston Dash	Space City Home Network (10 matches)	
Kansas City Current	KMCI-TV	In addition to local coverage, KMCI also simulcasts all Current games aired nationally on Ion Television despite not being an affiliate of the network. Ion and KMCI are both owned by the E. W. Scripps Company.
NJ/NY Gotham FC	MSG Network (9 matches)	
North Carolina Courage	WRAL-TV	Most matches on WRAL-DT2.
Orlando Pride	FanDuel Sports Network Florida/FanDuel Sports Network Sun/FanDuel Sports Network app	
Portland Thorns FC	KPTV/KPDX	Most matches on KPDX.
Racing Louisville FC	WAVE-DT3 (7 matches)	
San Diego Wave	KUSI-TV and KSWB-TV	
Seattle Reign	KCPQ	
Utah Royals FC	KMYU-DT2	
Washington Spirit	Monumental Sports Network	

==== Former teams ====
Team	Summary
Boston Breakers	As of 2017, Boston Breakers games were streamed exclusively by Go90 for American audiences and via the NWSL website for international viewers. As part of a three-year agreement with A&E Networks, Lifetime broadcasts one NWSL Game of the Week on Saturday afternoons. The Breakers were featured in the nationally televised Game of the Week on September 2, 2017. Previous seasons' games were broadcast on YouTube, MediaBoss Television, ESPN, and Fox Sports.
FC Kansas City	As of April 2017, FC Kansas City games were streamed exclusively by Go90 for American audiences and via the NWSL website for international viewers. For the 2017 season, the Blues will be featured in three nationally televised Lifetime NWSL Game of the Week broadcasts on June 3, August 16 and September 9. Ahead of the 2013 season, it was announced that games would be broadcast on the team's website and YouTube. Eight games were broadcast locally on Time Warner Cable's Metro Sports. During the 2014 season, nine games were broadcast on the same channel.

=== International broadcasters (outside USA) ===
The countries without broadcasting rights, can watch all NWSL matches via NWSL+ platform.

Country/region	Broadcaster
Africa	ESPN
Australia	Stan Sport
Brazil	Canal GOAT
Brazil	Xsports
Canada	TSN
Canada	OneSoccer
Central America	TV Azteca
Mexico	TV Azteca
Ireland	TNT Sports
United Kingdom	TNT Sports
Middle East and North Africa	Dubai Sports
South Korea	ENA Sports

=== NWSL Championship/Challenge Cup ===
Year	Network	Play-by-play	Color commentator(s)	Touchline reporter(s)
2026	CBS; Paramount+	Kate Scott	Lori Lindsey	Hailey Sutton
2026	NWSL+	JP Dellacamera	Saskia Webber	—N/a
2025	CBS; Paramount+	Kate Scott	Lori Lindsey	Claudia Pagan
2025	NWSL+	JP Dellacamera	Jill Loyden	—N/a
2024	CBS; Paramount+	Jacqui Oatley	Lori Lindsey	Emily Proud
2024	NWSL+	Josh Eastern	Jill Loyden	—N/a
2023	CBS; Paramount+	Jacqui Oatley	Lori Lindsey	Lianne Sanderson; Tiffany Blackmon
2022	CBS	Jenn Hildreth	Aly Wagner	Jenny Chiu; Lori Lindsey
2022	Twitch	Maura Sheridan	Anna Witte	—N/a
2021	CBS	Jenn Hildreth	Aly Wagner	Marisa Pilla
2021	Twitch	Josh Tolle	Kaylyn Kyle	—N/a
2020 ^{INT}	CBS	Jenn Hildreth	Aly Wagner	Marisa Pilla
2020 ^{INT}	Twitch	Mike Watts	Lori Lindsey	—N/a
2019	ESPN2	Jenn Hildreth	Aly Wagner	Marisa Pilla
2018	Lifetime	Jenn Hildreth	Aly Wagner	Dalen Cuff
2017	Lifetime	Jenn Hildreth	Aly Wagner	Dalen Cuff
2016	FS1	Jenn Hildreth	Kyndra de St. Aubin	—N/a
2015	FS1	Jenn Hildreth	Kyndra de St. Aubin	Julie Stewart-Binks
2014	ESPN2	Glenn Davis	Mónica González	—N/a
2013	FS2	Steve Cangialosi	Kyndra de St. Aubin	Kate Markgraf

^INT– Twitch's Challenge Cup worldwide coverage was not available for USA and CAN viewers.

== NWSL Broadcast Bootcamp ==
Annually since 2023, the NWSL has been conducting a "Broadcast Bootcamp" for training in sports media careers. The program supports current and former players in "gaining real-world experience across a variety of off-field roles within the sports industry", including working alongside established NWSL broadcasters, and in "career opportunities in live sports production, including roles such as match producer, director, replay operator, and graphics producer." The program has grown from an initial 2 participants in 2023 to 11 in 2025.

== See also ==
- Women's United Soccer Association on television
- Women's Professional Soccer on television
- Sports broadcasting contracts in the United States#National competitions
