= History of Major League Soccer on television =

Major League Soccer has been broadcast live in the U.S. nationally since the league's inception in 1996 and in Canada since 2007. In the United States the game is broadcast in English on Fox Sports 1 and Fox, in Spanish on Fox Deportes. In Canada, MLS is broadcast on TSN in English and RDS in French.

All matches are streamed live on MLS Season Pass on the Apple TV app.

== Historical breakdown ==
From the 2015 season until 2022, MLS matches were broadcast nationally by ESPN networks and Fox Sports in English, and Univision networks in Spanish under an eight-year contract. Each broadcaster had a window for national regular season matches, with UniMás airing a game on Friday nights in Spanish and additional matches on Univision Deportes Network, and ESPN and Fox Sports 1 airing games on Sunday evenings in English. ESPN, FS1, and Univision share in coverage of the playoffs, while ABC and FOX alternate broadcasting the MLS Cup in English. ESPN and FS1 also alternated broadcasting the MLS All-Star Game in English, In total, at least 125 matches are aired per-season across all three networks. The three contracts have an average estimated value of $90 million per season—five times larger than the average $18 million value of the previous contracts with ESPN, Univision, and NBC Sports.

Matches not televised nationally were broadcast regionally, often by regional sports networks like Fox Sports Networks, Comcast SportsNet, Spectrum Sports and Root Sports, and sometimes by terrestrial stations like KTXA, WRDQ anad KMYU. Regionally televised matches were available outside their local markets on ESPN+.

From 2012 to 2014, MLS matches were broadcast by NBC Sports, with 40 matches per year—primarily on NBCSN, and select matches broadcast on the NBC network. The move from Fox Soccer to the more widely distributed NBCSN proved successful, with viewership numbers doubling for the 2012 season over those of Fox Soccer.

=== 1990s ===
On March 15, 1994, Major League Soccer with ESPN and ABC Sports announced the league's first television rights deal without any players, coaches, or teams in place. The three-year agreement committed 10 games on ESPN, 25 on ESPN2, and the MLS Cup on ABC. The deal gave MLS no rights fees but split advertising revenue between the league and networks.

MLS Soccer Saturday was the first weekly presentation of MLS games, which usually started at 4 PM EST and was sponsored by Radioshack. Before the start of the 2007 season, the league and ESPN announced that MLS Primetime Thursday would be the flagship broadcast as part of a new television contract, ending an 11-year broadcast run of matches on Saturday afternoons.

The inaugural MLS Cup was broadcast in the United States on ABC in English, with a broadcast team that was used by ESPN for its previous MLS matches during the regular season and playoffs. Phil Schoen was the play-by-play commentator, while Ty Keough and Bill McDermott provided color analysis; Roger Twibell was the studio anchor and was joined by Revolution defender Alexi Lalas, who also performed the national anthem with his electric guitar. The final reached an estimated audience of 1.6 million viewers, exceeding league expectations but falling short of other sports programming from that day. In local markets, the match had an estimated Nielsen rating of 2.4 in the Washington D.C. metropolitan area and 3.3 in Greater Los Angeles.

The 1997 MLS Cup was also broadcast on ABC in the United States, where it was watched by an estimated television audience of 2.2 million viewers, setting a record that would stand until the 2016 final. Bob Ley replaced Phil Schoen, who served as the sideline reporter for 1997 only, as play-by-play while Ty Keough returned as a color commentator. The match was also televised in more than 100 foreign markets by ESPN International; it was the first MLS Cup to be broadcast in the United Kingdom, where it aired on Eurosport.

The 1998 MLS Cup was once again broadcast in the United States on ABC with English commentary and Spanish via secondary audio programming. For the second time in three years, play-by-play announcer Phil Schoen and color commentator Ty Keough called the ABC broadcast, who were joined by field reporters Seamus Malin and Bill McDermott. The quartet had worked together on the network's World Cup broadcasts. The television broadcast drew a 1.2 national rating and reached an estimated 1 million households, a 33 percent decrease from previous finals.

The match was also broadcast by local radio affiliates in multiple languages. In Chicago, WZCH carried the English broadcast, WRZA carried Spanish commentary, and WKTA had the match in Polish. The Spanish broadcast was aired on WACA in Washington, D.C., and the surrounding area.

The entire 1999 All-Star Game was aired to ESPN2 as ABC aired a special news report on the search for John F. Kennedy Jr.'s missing plane.

The ABC broadcast of the MLS Cup 1999 was led by play-by-play announcer Phil Schoen and color commentator Ty Keough for the third time in four years, who were this time, joined by studio host Rob Stone. MLS players John Harkes and Alexi Lalas joined the pre-game and halftime broadcasts as co-hosts. ABC deployed 18 cameras for the match and added additional field microphones to capture crowd noise. The television broadcast on ABC drew a 1.0 national rating, a 17% decline from 1998, partially due to competition from National Football League games. Pop singer Christina Aguilera sang the national anthem before the match and performed in the halftime show.

=== 2000s ===
The 2000 MLS Cup was again broadcast in the United States on ABC with English commentary and Spanish via secondary audio programming. The English broadcast was led by play-by-play announcer Jack Edwards and color commentator Ty Keough, who were joined by studio hosts Rob Stone and Alexi Lalas. The Spanish broadcast comprised play-by-play announcer Roberto Abramowitz and MetroStars coach Octavio Zambrano as color commentator. The ABC broadcast drew a 1.0 national rating, matching the 1999 final. The local broadcast in the Kansas City area had an estimated 5 percent share of televisions, falling behind concurrent broadcasts of the film Blank Check and a Kansas City Chiefs game that drew 64 percent.

ABC moved the start time of the 2001 MLS Cup by one hour from 1:30 p.m. Eastern Time to 12:30 p.m. to accommodate scheduling changes caused by the September 11 attacks. The English commentary crew once again consisted of Jack Edwards for play-by-play, Ty Keough with color analysis, and other programming hosted by Rob Stone, who was this time, joined by Dave Dir. The Spanish broadcast was transmitted over secondary audio programming on ABC and was headlined by play-by-play commentator Hammer Londoño and color analyst Hernan Pereyra of Radio Unica. The match was also broadcast in 108 other countries by ESPN International. The ABC broadcast earned a 1.0 Nielsen rating, beating the previous two editions of the cup.

Bad weather at RFK Stadium in Washington, D.C. led to a 57 minute long rain delay in the first half of the 2002 All-Star Game. Consequently, because ABC had to broadcast World News Tonight at 6:00 p.m. Eastern Time, the rest of the game was switched over to ESPN.

English play-by-play commentary for the 2002 MLS Cup on ABC was provided by JP Dellacamera with color analysis by Ty Keough and pregame and halftime shows hosted by Terry Gannon and Eric Wynalda, reprising their roles from ABC's coverage of the 2002 FIFA World Cup. The Spanish broadcast was handled by play-by-play commentator Ernesto Motta and color analyst Andres Rodriguez. The ABC broadcast was watched by an estimated audience of 1.2 million views, the lowest for an MLS Cup at the time.

English play-by-play commentary for the 2003 MLS Cup on ABC was once again provided by Dellacamera with color analysis Keough. Ernesto Motta returned from the previous cup's Spanish-language broadcast, working alongside color analyst Robert Sierra. ABC/ESPN provided a total of 20 cameras, including aerial coverage from a Goodyear Blimp. The ABC broadcast earned a Nielsen rating of 0.6, the lowest figure recorded for an MLS Cup.

In 2004, Dellacamera was now joined by Eric Wynalda on commentary for ABC's broadcast of the MLS Cup. Motta returned to the Spanish-language broadcast, working alongside color analyst Robert Sierra. The ABC/ESPN broadcast was produced by a team of 85 people and used 20 cameras, including specialized replay and slow-motion cameras. The match was also broadcast in over 175 other countries by ESPN International. The ABC broadcast earned a Nielsen rating of 0.8 and averaged a local 2.4 rating in the Kansas City metropolitan area—far below the competing Kansas City Chiefs game.

==== 2005-06 ====
From 2005 to 2011, FOX Soccer showed 25 to 30 live games each season, plus 2 to 3 playoff games. In 2007, MLS Saturday started showing a 30-minute pregame and a 30-minute postgame show for each game.

The 2005 MLS Cup was televised in the United States on ABC in English and Spanish using secondary audio programming. English play-by-play commentary was provided by JP Dellacamera with color analysis by Eric Wynalda, reprising their roles at MLS Cup 2004. Brandi Chastain provided sideline reporting, while Rob Stone anchored the pre-game and halftime shows. The Spanish language broadcast was provided by ESPN Deportes and included commentary from Randall Alvarez and Eduardo Biscayart. The match was also streamed via internet radio on MLSnet.com.

After averaging 223,000 viewers during the 2006 season, ESPN2's ratings increased slightly in 2007, to 289,000 viewers, including a regular-season high of 658,000 viewers for David Beckham's second regular season match. However, ratings dipped to 253,000 in 2008. Attendance often lagged, with few sellouts for the weeknight matches, with marquee club Los Angeles Galaxy unable to host home matches at the Home Depot Center on Thursdays due to its agreement with California State University, Dominguez Hills.

On August 4, 2006, ESPN reached a comprehensive multimedia agreement with Soccer United Marketing (SUM) for the rights to Major League Soccer through 2014. As part of the eight-year agreement, ESPN2 will televise 26 regular-season and three playoff MLS matches each year, all in primetime on Thursdays.

Highlights of the agreement include:

- ESPN2 will televise 26 regular-season MLS matches, primarily on Thursday nights.
- ESPN2 will televise three MLS playoff matches.
- ABC will televise one regular-season MLS match, the MLS All-Star Game, and MLS Cup. (replaced by ESPN in 2009, until 2017, returned starting in 2019)
- Televised coverage of the first round of the MLS Draft.
- MLS telecasts can be re-aired in full or abbreviated versions on any ESPN media platforms
- Extensive footage rights for all ESPN media platforms such as SportsCenter, ESPNEWS, ESPN Motion, ESPN360, etc.
- ESPN will also produce and be solely responsible for the content, whereas, they had not been able to do that in the past.

The 2006 MLS Cup was again televised in the United States on ABC in English and Spanish using secondary audio programming, earning a Nielsen rating of 0.8 and an estimated audience of 1.24 million. English play-by-play commentary was provided by Boston-based sportscaster Dave O'Brien and color analysis by Eric Wynalda and former U.S. men's national team coach Bruce Arena. Brandi Chastain provided sideline reporting, while Rob Stone anchored the pre-game and halftime shows. The match was also carried in 96 countries by ESPN International and its associated networks.

==== 2007-09 ====
Before the start of the 2007 season, the league and ESPN announced that MLS Primetime Thursday would be the flagship broadcast as part of a new television contract, ending an 11-year broadcast run of matches on Saturday afternoons. Also in 2007, ESPN2's coverage of the MLS included new on-screen scoreboards, similar to those used on other sports telecasts. In 2008, another new score graphic was debuted, this time in the upper left-hand corner of the screen.

ESPN added several features in an attempt to improve presentation—high-definition broadcasts, a sky-cam for some matches, a virtual offside line, a ball tracer, a sideline reporter, and three commentators. For the inaugural season, 2006 FIFA World Cup announcers Dave O'Brien and Eric Wynalda served as play-by-play and analyst, respectively, with Allen Hopkins serving as the sideline reporter. Tommy Smyth was later added as a co-analyst. Glenn Davis and Rob Stone filled in for O'Brien on occasion.

ESPN would join forces with Fox Sports and Univision to broadcast over 100 MLS games (combined), live and exclusive, from 2015 and 2022 in its new media rights deal. ESPN has been involved with the league since its inception in 1996.

Coverage of MLS expanded into Canada in 2007 with the addition of Toronto FC. Currently, English-language national MLS broadcast rights in Canada are held by the TSN networks through a five-year deal first renewed in 2017. The networks primarily broadcast matches involving the league's Canadian franchises, in combination with separate "regional" rights deals giving TSN exclusive rights to all Toronto FC and Vancouver Whitecaps FC matches. A limited number of matches are also carried by CTV.

The 2007 MLS Cup was televised in the United States on ABC in English and TeleFutura in Spanish for the first time. English play-by-play commentary was provided by Boston-based sportscaster Dave O'Brien, reprising his role from the 2006 broadcast, and color analysis by Eric Wynalda and Julie Foudy. The match was also broadcast on local radio stations in New England and the Houston area. The match was broadcast nationally for the first time in Canada, where it was carried by CBC Country Canada using the commentary feed from ABC.

For the 2008 season, JP Dellacamera and John Harkes replaced O'Brien and Wynalda as the lead team on ESPN2 with Davis, Smyth, and Julie Foudy occasionally filling in.

Former CBC affiliate, then E! and now CityTV affiliate CHAT-TV in Medicine Hat, Alberta did not air the 2008 All-Star Game, because of Calgary CBC station CBRT-TV, as well as online through live streaming on the CBC Sports website.

The 2008 MLS Cup was televised in the United States on ABC in English and TeleFutura in Spanish. English play-by-play commentary was provided by JP Dellacamera with color analysis by John Harkes and studio analysis by Rob Stone, Julie Foudy, and Alexi Lalas. The ABC broadcast was produced by ESPN and featured 20 cameras and the use of a virtual replay system. The match was broadcast in Canada on CBC and CBC Bold, with English commentary by Nigel Reed and Jason DeVos. It was also carried in 142 countries on ESPN International and an additional 23 countries in Europe by local broadcasters.

Following the 2008 season, ESPN discontinued MLS Primetime Thursday, citing lagging ratings and hoping to find better lead-in programming. It was replaced by the MLS Game of the Week, which rotates among a variety of nights and time slots.

Ratings have largely remained steady or stagnant despite the move from the regular time slot. Viewership averaged 299,000 per broadcast in 2009, up from 253,000 in 2008; however, it dipped to 253,000 in 2010 before rebounding to 291,000 in 2011 with some matches (having been moved to ESPN as opposed to ESPN2) drawing over 600,000 viewers.

On January 23, 2009, Maple Leaf Sports and Entertainment, owners of Major League Soccer franchise Toronto FC (along with other major sports teams in the city), announced they would acquire Insight Sports' interest in GolTV. The deal was approved by the CRTC on June 2, 2009. In 2015, MLSE reported to the CRTC that it had bought out GOL TV USA's stake in the channel.

For the 2009 season and beyond, the Thursday telecast was replaced by a variety of primetime games on Wednesdays through Saturdays. Beginning in 2009, until 2019, as part of ESPN's far-reaching strategy of moving sports programming to ESPN, all matches - including MLS Cup - are now aired on either ESPN or ESPN2. Since 2019, select regular season and playoff games, and in odd-numbered years, only the MLS Cup will air on ABC.

The 2009 MLS Cup was this time around, televised in the United States on ESPN and ESPN360.com in English and Galavisión in Spanish. GolTV Canada broadcast the match in Canada, and ESPN International carried the match in 122 countries, primarily in Latin America, the Middle East, and Oceania. This was the first edition of the MLS Cup to be carried on a cable network, as the previous thirteen were on ABC, and was scheduled later at night to compete with NBC Sunday Night Football. ESPN covered the match using 19 cameras and several digital features, including player tracking statistics and an offside line displayed on instant replays. JP Dellacamera was once again, the lead play-by-play commentator and John Harkes provided color commentary. The network's coverage of the final was later criticized by Salt Lake City-area media outlets for its favoritism of the Galaxy.

=== 2010s ===
In February 2011, the TSN family of networks (in which ESPN owns a 20% interest) announced a six-year deal for national MLS broadcast rights in Canada. TSN and TSN2 would broadcast 24 games during the 2011 season and air a minimum of 30 games per season during the subsequent five seasons, all featuring at least one Canadian team. French-language sister networks RDS and RDS2 had similar broadcast rights. The networks also carried the MLS Cup and select playoff games, the MLS All-Star Game, and additional games not involving Canadian teams. GolTV Canada will also continue to carry selected all-U.S. MLS matchups.

Toronto FC regional games were split between the TSN and Sportsnet families of networks (their parent companies, Rogers Communications and Bell Canada, jointly owned a stake in TFC's parent company). Sportsnet also aired Vancouver Whitecaps FC games (primarily on its Pacific feed and national network Sportsnet One), and TVA Sports aired Montreal Impact games.

Also in 2011, MLS on Fox Soccer was rebranded as Soccer Night in America, with its production revamped to provide a viewing experience similar to NFL on Fox. However, Fox was outbid by NBC Sports Network for its MLS package for the 2012-2014 seasons.

On January 5, 2012, NBC Sports signed a three-year contract with Major League Soccer to nationally televise 40 matches per year, which would primarily air on the NBC Sports Network (now NBCSN), beginning with the 2012 season. All NBC telecasts included pre-game and post-game coverage, with the network intending to promote its games during broadcasts of its other major sports properties, such as the Olympics. More specifically as part of the new deal, NBC would carry three regular season and two playoff matches (the first time since 2002 that that many MLS games were to be broadcast on English-language network television), as well as 38 regular season and three playoff matches on sister channel NBCSN; both networks also aired matches featuring the United States men's national soccer team (with two games airing on each network).

NBC Sports took over the Major League Soccer rights from Fox Soccer and Fox Deportes. Previous deals with U.S. partners ESPN, ESPN2, ESPN Deportes and Galavisión continued in 2012, as did with Canadian partners TSN, TSN2 and GolTV.

NBC Sports' ratings for MLS improved greatly due to the increased presence of NBCSN (fueled by their NHL television package), with average ratings for the games jumping 122% for the inaugural season of the contract in 2012. Yet still, several games ranked at or near the bottom of the ratings among sporting event and entertainment telecasts, whereas ESPN's MLS coverage – which was railed by fans as being inferior to NBC's – had higher viewership, attributed to the greater availability of ESPN and ESPN2 nationally.

NBC and NBCSN's MLS telecasts during the 2013 season averaged 115,000 viewers per game, a steep drop from 2012. Looking to capitalize on further soccer opportunities, NBC Sports acquired the rights to the Premier League from Fox Soccer in 2012, in time for the 2013–14 Premier League season. Speculation abounded on if MLS was to be treated by the sports division secondarily to the Premier League, which has a greater U.S. audience than the domestic league, placing MLS' future with NBC in doubt.

In 2014, negotiations broke down between NBC and MLS on a new television contract. The league instead signed an agreement with Fox Sports to serve as its U.S. broadcast partner, beginning with the 2015 season in a shared rights deal with ESPN.

NBC also operates a blog, ProSoccerTalk, which ran news headlines from Major League Soccer and other international soccer leagues. With NBC acquiring the broadcast television rights to the Premier League in 2013, significantly more coverage of the English top-flight was added to the site.

==== 2015-19 ====
In 2015, MLS and TSN announced a new broadcast agreement that included a five-year media rights extension. Under this new partnership, TSN became the exclusive English-language broadcaster of MLS in Canada beginning in the 2017 season. TSN currently delivers exclusive coverage of every MLS game featuring Toronto FC and Vancouver Whitecaps FC, a select number of CF Montréal matches, a selection of matches featuring U.S. teams, as well as exclusive English-language coverage of the MLS All-Star Game, MLS Cup Playoffs, and MLS Cup.

The 2015 agreement also included a new five-year agreement with TVA Sports as the official French-language broadcaster in Canada.

Meanwhile, MLS Soccer Sunday is telecast primarily on ESPN, ESPN2 in the 5 pm Eastern Time Zone broadcast window. Most matches are simulcast live on ESPN Deportes. The first broadcast on March 8, 2015 was the home opener of Orlando City SC and fellow expansion side New York City FC. The match, which ended in a 1–1 tie, was broadcast from the Citrus Bowl in Orlando, Florida before a crowd of 62,510 spectators.

English-language and Spanish-language feeds are carried on ESPN3.

As part of the current broadcast agreement between Major League Soccer and its network partners, ESPN Networks and Fox Sports each contracted to broadcast 34 weekly matches in an assigned broadcast window. In addition to the weekly broadcast window, each broadcast group gained the right to transmit their broadcasts on their respective digital broadcast service.

Additionally, ESPN Networks was granted the right to develop an over-the-top content (OTT) service consisting of all out-of-market broadcasts of any MLS match not part of the MLS Soccer Sunday broadcasts nor those of Viernes de Fútbol, the Friday evening presentation of MLS on the networks of Univision. Although the service was intended to begin with the 2015 MLS season in the first year of the new agreement, ESPN decided it could not logistically offer the service that year and MLS continued to offer its MLS Live digital service as it had previous seasons.

MLS Soccer Sunday is telecast primarily on Fox Sports 1 and Fox Deportes in the 7 pm Eastern Time Zone broadcast window. The first broadcast on March 8, 2015 was the first match of a doubleheader featuring Sporting Kansas City and the New York Red Bulls. The second match featured Seattle Sounders FC and New England Revolution.

In 2015, Soccer Night in America was again rebranded as MLS Soccer Sunday due to a new deal between Fox and ESPN/ABC, with games on ESPN airing from 5-7 pm ET, and games on Fox Sports 1 airing from 7-9 pm ET. In addition, during select weekends, ABC will air select games at 3 pm ET.

Also starting in 2015, Viernes de Fútbol is the first and (as of 2016) only exclusive broadcast of any major professional sports league in the United States and Canada on a Spanish-language television network. English language commentary is available using the second audio program and on Twitter.

On January 10, 2017, TVA Sports acquired national French-language rights to Major League Soccer.

In 2018, online streaming service DAZN obtained Major League Soccer's digital out-of-market service MLS Live—with live and on-demand streaming of matches featuring U.S. teams (matches with Canadian teams are only available after a 48-hour delay to protect the league's main rightsholders TSN and TVA Sports).

For the 2019 Major League Soccer season, Jon Champion was named MLS on ESPN lead play-by-play commentator. During the MLS Cup 2019 on ABC, no ESPN logo other than the mic flags appeared on the screen and the broadcast was introduced as "the 2019 MLS Cup Final on ABC" with the ABC logo appearing on the screen. For all soccer coverage, the ABC branding is used with little to no use of the ESPN logo (for example the Bundesliga on ABC).

==== 2020-present ====
The 2020 MLS Cup was broadcast in English by Fox in the United States and TSN in Canada. UniMás and Univision Deportes carried the Spanish broadcast in the United States, while TVA Sports carried the French broadcast in Canada. The match was also broadcast in 190 countries by several international networks, including ESPN Latin America, BeIN Sports, and Abu Dhabi Sports. The MLS Cup final was watched by 1.071 million spectators on Fox, an increase of 30 percent from 2019, and 459,000 on UniMás in the United States.

The 2021 All-Star Game and Skills Challenge were both broadcast in the United States on Fox Sports 1 in English and TUDN in Spanish, as well as TSN and TVA Sports in Canada. Fox Sports broadcast the match in 4K HDR and also deployed several special slow-motion cameras for the match, as well as a skycam. The Fox Sports broadcast averaged 175,000 viewers, setting a record low for the event's English broadcasts, while the TUDN broadcast averaged 1.4 million and peaked at 1.6 million—the second-most for a Spanish broadcast of the match.

The 2021 MLS Cup was broadcast in the United States on ABC in English and UniMás and TUDN in Spanish. The Canadian broadcast was carried on TSN in English and TVA Sports in French. The ABC broadcast featured Jon Champion as the play-by-play announcer and Taylor Twellman as color commentator, along with Sam Borden as sideline reporter and Mark Clattenburg as rules analyst. It was filmed with 28 cameras, including nine fixed cameras, four goalpost cameras, and a skycam above the pitch. The UniMás broadcast featured commentary from Luis Omar Tapia, Diego Balado, Ramses Sandoval, and Daniel Nohra. The match was also broadcast internationally in 200 countries, including on ESPN International in Latin America, the Caribbean, and Oceania.

The ABC broadcast was watched by an average of 1.14 million viewers, peaking at 1.63 million during the penalty shootout. It was slightly higher than the Fox broadcast for MLS Cup 2020 and 38 percent higher than the MLS Cup 2019 broadcast on ABC, but lower than the Thanksgiving playoff match featuring Colorado and Portland. The top viewing markets included Portland, where the match garnered a 11.7 rating, Greenville, North Carolina, Seattle, and New York City. The UniMás and TUDN broadcast in Spanish drew 354,000 viewers.

In 2022, Apple Inc. and MLS reached a deal to stream every MLS match on Apple TV beginning in 2023. The deal will still allow for traditional network coverage, but Apple will be the primary rightsholder.

== See also ==
- List of MLS Cup broadcasters
- List of current Major League Soccer broadcasters
- Sports broadcasting contracts in the United States#Soccer
- Sports broadcasting contracts in Canada#Soccer / Association Football
- Major League Soccer#Media coverage
