= List of Major League Soccer All-Star Game broadcasters =

The following is a list of the television networks and announcers that have broadcast the Major League Soccer All-Star Game.

== 2020s ==
Year	Network	Play-by-play	Color commentator(s)	Sideline reporters	Pregame host	Pregame analysts
2026	Apple TV	Jake Zivin	Taylor Twellman	Jillian Sakovits	Kevin Egan	Bradley Wright-Phillips, Dax McCarty, Sacha Kljestan, and Kaylyn Kyle
2025	Apple TV	Jake Zivin	Taylor Twellman	Jillian Sakovits	Kevin Egan	Bradley Wright-Phillips, Dax McCarty, Sacha Kljestan, and Kaylyn Kyle
2024	Apple TV	Jake Zivin	Taylor Twellman	Jillian Sakovits	Kevin Egan	Bradley Wright-Phillips, Sacha Kljestan, and Kaylyn Kyle
2023	Apple TV	Jake Zivin	Taylor Twellman and Maurice Edu	Jillian Sakovits	Liam McHugh	Bradley Wright-Phillips, Sacha Kljestan, and Kaylyn Kyle
2022	ESPN	Jon Champion	Taylor Twellman	Cristina Alexander and Jillian Sakovits	Sebastian Salazar	Herculez Gomez and Ben Olsen
2022	TSN	Jon Champion	Taylor Twellman	Cristina Alexander and Jillian Sakovits	Sebastian Salazar	Herculez Gomez and Ben Olsen
2021	FS1	John Strong	Stuart Holden	Rodolfo Landeros	Rob Stone	Alexi Lalas and Maurice Edu
2021	TSN	John Strong	Stuart Holden	Rodolfo Landeros	Rob Stone	Alexi Lalas and Maurice Edu
2020	Canceled due to the COVID-19 pandemic.					

=== Notes ===
- The 2021 game was originally scheduled to take place on July 29, 2020, during the 2020 season, but was postponed on May 19, 2020 due to the COVID-19 pandemic. The game was televised domestically on Fox Sports 1 and Univision in the United States, and on TSN and TVA Sports in Canada.

== 2010s ==
Year	Network	Play-by-play	Color commentator(s)	Sideline reporter(s)	Pregame host	Pregame analysts
2019	FS1	John Strong	Stuart Holden	Katie Witham	Rob Stone	Alexi Lalas and Maurice Edu
2019	TSN	Luke Wileman	Steven Caldwell and Kristian Jack		Rob Stone	Alexi Lalas and Maurice Edu
2018	ESPN	Adrian Healey	Taylor Twellman	Sebastián Salazar	Max Bretos	Alejandro Moreno and Kasey Keller
2018	TSN	Luke Wileman	Steven Caldwell and Kristian Jack		Max Bretos	Alejandro Moreno and Kasey Keller
2017	FS1	John Strong	Brad Friedel	Katie Witham and Kate Abdo	Rob Stone	Alexi Lalas, Eric Wynalda, and Stuart Holden
2017	TSN	Luke Wileman	Steven Caldwell and Kristian Jack		Rob Stone	Alexi Lalas, Eric Wynalda, and Stuart Holden
2016	ESPN	Adrian Healey	Taylor Twellman	Mónica González	Max Bretos	Alejandro Moreno and Kasey Keller
2016	TSN	Luke Wileman	Steven Caldwell and Kristian Jack		Max Bretos	Alejandro Moreno and Kasey Keller
2015	FS1	John Strong	Brad Friedel	Julie Stewart-Binks	Rob Stone	Alexi Lalas, Eric Wynalda, and Stuart Holden
2015	TSN	Luke Wileman	Jason de Vos		Rob Stone	Alexi Lalas, Eric Wynalda, and Stuart Holden
2014	ESPN2	Adrian Healey	Taylor Twellman	Mónica González	Max Bretos	Alexi Lalas, Alejandro Moreno, and Kasey Keller
2014	TSN	Luke Wileman	Jason de Vos and Kristian Jack	Mónica González	Max Bretos	Alexi Lalas, Alejandro Moreno, and Kasey Keller
2013	ESPN2	Adrian Healey	Taylor Twellman	Mónica González	Max Bretos	Alexi Lalas, Alejandro Moreno, and Kasey Keller
2013	TSN	Luke Wileman	Jason de Vos	Mónica González	Max Bretos	Alexi Lalas, Alejandro Moreno, and Kasey Keller
2012	ESPN2	Adrian Healey	Taylor Twellman	Mónica González	Max Bretos	Alexi Lalas and Kasey Keller
2012	TSN	Luke Wileman	Jason de Vos	Mónica González	Max Bretos	Alexi Lalas and Kasey Keller
2011	ESPN2	Adrian Healey	John Harkes		Rob Stone and Max Bretos	Alexi Lalas, Steve McManaman, and Taylor Twellman
2011	TSN	Luke Wileman	Jason de Vos		Rob Stone and Max Bretos	Alexi Lalas, Steve McManaman, and Taylor Twellman
2010	ESPN2	JP Dellacamera	John Harkes	Allen Hopkins	Rob Stone	Alexi Lalas and Julie Foudy

== 2000s ==
Year	Network	Play-by-play	Color commentator(s)	Sideline reporter(s)	Pregame host	Pregame analysts
2009	ESPN2	JP Dellacamera	John Harkes	Allen Hopkins	Rob Stone	Alexi Lalas and Julie Foudy
2008	ESPN2	JP Dellacamera	John Harkes	Allen Hopkins	Rob Stone	Alexi Lalas and Julie Foudy
2008	CBC	Nigel Reed	Jason de Vos	Mitch Peacock	Brenda Irving	
2007	ESPN2	Dave O'Brien	Eric Wynalda and Tommy Smyth	Allen Hopkins	Rob Stone	
2006	ESPN	Dave O'Brien	Eric Wynalda		Rob Stone	
2005	ABC	JP Dellacamera	Eric Wynalda	Brandi Chastain		
2004	ABC	JP Dellacamera	Eric Wynalda	Lorrie Fair	Rob Stone	
2003	ABC	JP Dellacamera	Ty Keough and Marcelo Balboa		Rob Stone	
2002	ABC (start)	Jack Edwards	Ty Keough	Veronica Paysse	Rob Stone	
2002	ESPN (finish)	Jack Edwards	Ty Keough	Veronica Paysse	Rob Stone	
2001	ABC	Jack Edwards	Ty Keough		Rob Stone	
2000	ABC	Jack Edwards	Ty Keough		Rob Stone	

=== Notes ===
- Former CBC affiliate, then E! and now CityTV affiliate CHAT-TV in Medicine Hat, Alberta did not air the 2008 game, because of Calgary CBC station CBRT-TV, as well as online through live streaming on the CBC Sports website.
- In August 2006, MLS and ESPN announced an eight-year contract spanning 2007–2014, giving the league its first rights-fee agreement worth $8 million annually. This deal gave league a regular primetime slot on Thursdays, televised coverage of the first round of the MLS SuperDraft, and an expanded presence on other ESPN properties such as ESPN360 (now ESPN3) and Mobile ESPN. The agreement also placed each season's opening match, All-Star Game, and MLS Cup on ABC.
- Bad weather at RFK Stadium in Washington, D.C. led to a 57 minute long rain delay in the first half of the 2002 game. Consequently, because ABC had to broadcast World News Tonight at 6:00 p.m. Eastern Time, the rest of the game was switched over to ESPN.

== 1990s ==
Year	Network	Play-by-play	Color commentator(s)	Sideline reporter(s)	Pregame host
1999	ESPN2	Phil Schoen	Ty Keough	—N/a	Rob Stone
1998	ABC	Phil Schoen	Ty Keough		Rob Stone
1997	ESPN	Phil Schoen	Ty Keough	Bill McDermott	Rob Stone
1996	ESPN	Phil Schoen	Ty Keough	Bill McDermott	Roger Twibell

=== Notes ===
- The entire 1999 game was aired to ESPN2 as ABC aired a special news report on the search for John F. Kennedy Jr.'s missing plane.
- On March 15, 1994, Major League Soccer with ESPN and ABC Sports announced the league's first television rights deal without any players, coaches, or teams in place. The three-year agreement committed 10 games on ESPN, 25 on ESPN2, and the MLS Cup on ABC. The deal gave MLS no rights fees but split advertising revenue between the league and networks.

== See also ==
- Major League Soccer on television
  - MLS Primetime Thursday
  - MLS Game of the Week
  - Viernes de Fútbol
- List of current Major League Soccer broadcasters
  - List of MLS Cup broadcasters
