= MLS on ESPN =

MLS soccer cable telecasts (1996–2022)

- Starring: Various personalities (see below)
- Country of origin: United States

Production
- Running time: 2 or 2.5 hours

Original release
- Network: ESPN, ESPN2, ESPN+, ABC, & ESPN Deportes
- Release: April 6, 1996 – October 27, 2022

Related
- MLS Soccer Saturday; MLS Primetime Thursday; MLS Saturday; MLS Game of the Week; MLS Soccer Sunday

MLS on ESPN was the branding used for television presentations of Major League Soccer on ESPN properties, including ABC and ESPN2. Major League Soccer on ESPN debuted in 1996, the league's first season, and ended in 2022 when MLS and ESPN did not renew their broadcast contract. From 1996 to 2006, the weekly soccer match on ESPN2 was called MLS Soccer Saturday, but in the new contract, that was replaced by MLS Primetime Thursday. For the 2009 season and beyond, the Thursday telecast was replaced by a variety of primetime games on Wednesdays through Saturdays. From 2009 until 2019, as part of ESPN's far-reaching strategy of moving sports programming to ESPN, all matches – including MLS Cup – were on either ESPN or ESPN2.

== History ==
On August 4, 2006, ESPN reached a comprehensive multimedia agreement with Soccer United Marketing (SUM) for the rights to Major League Soccer through 2014. As part of the eight-year agreement, ESPN2 televised 26 regular-season and three playoff MLS matches each year, all in primetime on Thursdays.

Highlights of the agreement included:

- ESPN2 airing 26 regular-season MLS matches, primarily on Thursday nights.
- ESPN2 airing three MLS playoff matches.
- ABC airing one regular-season MLS match, the MLS All-Star Game, and MLS Cup. (replaced by ESPN from 2009 to 2017; returned in 2019)
- Televised coverage of the first round of the MLS Draft.
- MLS telecasts re-aired in full or abbreviated versions on any ESPN media platforms
- Extensive footage rights for all ESPN media platforms such as SportsCenter, ESPNEWS, ESPN Motion, ESPN360, etc.
- ESPN producing and being solely responsible for the content, whereas, they had not been able to do that in the past.

Also in 2007, ESPN2's coverage of MLS included new on-screen scoreboards, similar to those used on other sports telecasts. In 2008, another new score graphic was debuted, this time in the upper left hand corner of the screen.

ESPN joined forces with Fox Sports and Univision to broadcast over 100 MLS games (combined), live and exclusive, from 2015 and 2022 in its succeeding media rights deal.

In 2023, MLS moved their inventory of games to MLS Season Pass, and the Fox Sports family. ESPN stopped televising MLS matches for the first time since the league's inception in 1996.

=== Technology ===
In addition, ESPN added numerous production enhancements to the telecasts through the years. They included:

- SkyCam: A common element during ESPN's NFL and MLB telecasts, SkyCam returned after making its debut in 2005 on select ABC and ESPN2 telecasts. The device provided an aerial view of the field, giving the viewer a unique angle to appreciate the development and speed of match action.
- MLS Wired: Telecasts featured use of the unobtrusive microphones, worn by select coaches and players, to capture some of the compelling in-game interactions and conversations.
- KickTrax
- HD: Beginning in 2007, all games aired in high-definition.

=== Criticism ===
ESPN was accused in 2011 by Soccer America writer Paul Kennedy of putting more emphasis on overall negativity and the more violent aspect of MLS games (such as two confrontations, two challenges and a player nursing a bloody head in its first six shots) in "Greatest Highlights of the Month" segment for their intermission reports.

== Personalities ==
=== Play-by-play announcers ===
- Steve Cangialosi (2016–2022)
- Jon Champion (2019–2022)
- Andres Cordero (2021–2022)
- Ian Darke (2010–2011)
- JP Dellacamera (1996–2010)
- Glenn Davis (2002–2022)
- Jack Edwards (2000–2002)
- Kevin Egan (2021–2022)
- Adrian Healey (2011–2022)
- Bob Ley (1996–1997)
- Dave O'Brien (2006–2007)
- Phil Schoen (1996–1999)
- Rob Stone (2002–2011)
- Tyler Terens (2022)
- Jonathan Yardley (2021–2022)
- Jake Zivin (2022)

=== Color commentators ===
- Bruce Arena (2006)
- Kyndra de St. Aubin (2021–2022)
- Brian Dunseth (2014–2022)
- Julie Foudy (2007–2009)
- Herculez Gomez (2017–2022)
- John Harkes (2008-2011)
- Danny Higginbotham (2021–2022)
- Kasey Keller (2014–2022)
- Ty Keough (1996–2003)
- Alexi Lalas (1996–2014)
- Lori Lindsey (2021–2022)
- Kyle Martino (2009-2010)
- Shep Messing (2020–2022)
- Alejandro Moreno (2014–2022)
- Ben Olsen (2022)
- Tommy Smyth (2007)
- Taylor Twellman (2010–2022)
- Eric Wynalda (2004–2007)

=== Sideline reporters ===
- Cristina Alexander (2022)
- Brandi Chastain (2005–2006)
- Allen Hopkins (2007–2009)
- Lorrie Fair (2004)
- Mónica González (2012–2016)
- Bill McDermott (1996–1997)
- Heather Mitts (2005–2006)
- Veronica Paysse (2002–2003)
- Jillian Sakovits (2022)
- Sebastian Salazar (2018–2022)
- Julie Stewart-Binks (2017)
- Rob Stone (1997–2011)
- Roger Twibell (1996)
- Katie Witham (2016)

=== Studio hosts ===
- Max Bretos (2010–2018)
- Adrian Healey (2019–2022)
- Sebastian Salazar – substitute studio host (2017–2020); lead studio host (2021–present)
- Rob Stone (1997–2011)
- Roger Twibell (1996)

=== Studio analysts ===
- Brandi Chastain (2005–2006)
- Brian Dunseth – studio analyst (2014–2022)
- Julie Foudy (2007–2009)
- Herculez Gomez – studio analyst (2017–2022)
- Kasey Keller – lead studio analyst (2012–2022)
- Alexi Lalas (1996–2014)
- Alejandro Moreno – lead studio analyst (2014–2022)
- Eric Wynalda (2004–2007)

== See also ==
- Soccer on ESPN/ABC
