= MLS Game of the Week =

- Starring: Adrian Healey; Taylor Twellman; Max Bretos; Alexi Lalas; Kasey Keller
- Country of origin: United States

Production
- Running time: 2 hours (2.5 hours select games)

Original release
- Network: ESPN2 (2009–2022)
- Release: 2009 – 2022

MLS Game of the Week was the weekly presentation of Major League Soccer games on ESPN2.

== History ==
Following the 2008 season, ESPN discontinued MLS Primetime Thursday, citing lagging ratings and hoping to find better lead-in programming. It was replaced by the MLS Game of the Week, which rotates among a variety of nights and time slots.

ESPN left all MLS televising duties after the 2022 MLS season, of which games are mainly shown via streaming on MLS Season Pass.

== Ratings ==
Ratings have largely remained steady if stagnant despite the move from the regular time slot. Viewership averaged 299,000 per broadcast in 2009, up from 253,000 in 2008; however, it dipped to 253,000 in 2010 before rebounding to 291,000 in 2011 with some matches (having been moved to ESPN as opposed to ESPN2) drawing over 600,000 viewers.

== Personalities ==
=== Play-by-play announcers ===
- JP Dellacamera – lead play-by-play (2009–2010)
- Ian Darke – secondary play-by-play (2010–2011)
- Adrian Healey – lead play-by-play (2011–2018), alternate play-by-play (2018–2022)
- Glenn Davis – secondary play-by-play (2009–2022)
- Jon Champion – lead play-by-play (2019–2022)

=== Analysts ===
- John Harkes – lead color commentator (2009–2011)
- Kyle Martino – secondary color commentator (2009–2010)
- Taylor Twellman – secondary color commentator (2011), lead color commentator (2012–2022)
- Brian Dunseth – secondary color commentator (2013–2022)

=== Sideline reporter ===
- Allen Hopkins (2009)
- Rob Stone (2009–2011)
- Mónica González (2012–2016)
- Katie Witham (2016)
- Julie Stewart-Binks (2017)
- Sebastian Salazar (2018–2022)
- Sam Borden (2021)
- Jillian Sakovits (2022)

=== Studio team ===
- Max Bretos – lead studio host (2010–2022)
- Julie Foudy – studio analyst (2007–2022)
- Alexi Lalas – lead studio analyst (2009–2014)
- Kasey Keller – lead studio analyst (2012–2022)
- Alejandro Moreno – lead studio analyst (2012–2022)
- Adrian Healey – secondary studio host (2019–2022)
- Sebastian Salazar – lead studio host (2021–2022)
- Robin Fraser – studio analyst (2021)
- Ben Olsen – studio analyst (2022)

== See also ==
- MLS on ESPN
- MLS Primetime Thursday
- MLS Soccer Saturday
