= ESPN Deportes Radio =

Spanish-language sports radio network (2005–2019)

- Type: Radio network
- Country: United States

Ownership
- Owner: ESPN, Inc. (Disney 80%/Hearst 20%)

History
- Launch date: October 5, 2005; 21 years ago
- Closed: September 8, 2019; 7 years ago
- Replaced by: Unanimo Deportes (in some markets)

Coverage
- Availability: National, through regional affiliates and satellite radio

Links
- Website: ESPN Deportes Radio

ESPN Deportes Radio was an American Spanish language sports radio network created and produced by Disney-owned ESPN. Programming included call-in talk shows and commentary from hosts about a full range of sporting events, including soccer, American football, baseball and boxing.

The network had stations in 15 states in the United States (Arizona, California, Florida, Idaho, Illinois, Maryland, Nevada, Oklahoma, New Hampshire, New Jersey, New Mexico, Oregon, Tennessee, Texas and Washington). It was also available terrestrially in Puerto Rico and in northern Mexico (by spillover radio signals) and was available nationally in the US on Sirius XM Radio on Channel 149.

The network shut down on September 8, 2019.

== Programming ==
ESPN Deportes Radio featured sports news and talk in Spanish, with a special emphasis on soccer. Popular personalities on the network included Jorge Ramos, Fernando Alvarez, Hernan Pereyra, José del Valle, Kenneth Garay, Rafael Ramos Villagrana, Elmer Polanco, Armando Talavera Broderick Zerpa, Giovanni Scavia, Omar Fuentes, Jairo Moncada, Noe Vazquez, Diego Cora, Miguel Mannella, Dairon Esmoriz, Humberto Carrera, José Francisco Rivera, Oscar Restrepo, Alberto "Mono" Gambetta, David Lopez, Miguel Angel Cebreros, Dionisio Estrada, Bernardo Pilatti, Guillermo Celis, Renato Bermudez, Alvaro Riet, Omar Orlando Salazar, David Faitelson, Carlos Arratia and Luis Escobar.

ESPN Deportes as well as its English counterpart ESPN Radio were retained by Disney in the sale of ABC Radio to Citadel Broadcasting, then to Cumulus Media. The network was flagshipped at WMYM in Miami, Florida, which was not owned by Disney (it sold the station, then a Radio Disney outlet, in 2015) but had been operated by Disney for several years before that.

== Discontinuation of service ==
On June 11, 2019, ESPN announced that it would be discontinuing the ESPN Deportes Radio network on September 8, 2019, citing consumer habits within the demographic skewing towards digital platforms, the lack of a cohesive sports culture among the United States' various Spanish-speaking communities, and the cost, expense and complications of running a full-time radio network. ESPN plans to convert some of the network's programming to podcasts. 10 full-time employees and 25 part-time employees would be laid off as a result of the closures.

Most stations became affiliates of rival Spanish-language sports network TUDN Radio and the newly launched Unanimo Deportes radio network (which is run by ESPN Deportes alumnus Lino García and also based at WMYM), while WEPN in New York City became a pass-through for the national ESPN Radio programs and local overflow not cleared by sister station WEPN-FM.

== Event broadcasts ==
Soccer

- UEFA Champions League
- UEFA Europa League
- UEFA Super Cup
- Major League Soccer (Viernes de Fútbol, Soccer Sunday, playoffs and MLS Cup)
- CONCACAF Champions League
- International Champions Cup
- CONMEBOL FIFA World Cup Qualifiers
- CONCACAF FIFA World Cup Qualifiers
- FIFA World Cup European Qualifiers
- Premier League
- La Liga
- FA Cup
- Copa del Rey
- Supercopa de España

Other

- National Basketball Association
- National Football League (Monday Night Football, Playoffs, Pro Bowl and Super Bowl)
- College Football Playoff
- Major League Baseball (Sunday Night Baseball, Saturday Game of the Week, Major League Baseball All-Star Game, postseason and World Series)
- World Baseball Classic
