= MLS Soccer Sunday =

- Presented by: See below
- Country of origin: United States

Production
- Running time: 2.0–2.5 hours per match

Original release
- Network: ESPN, ESPN2, ABC, ESPN Radio, Fox, FS1, SiriusXM (English); ESPN Deportes and Fox Deportes (Spanish)
- Release: March 8, 2015

Related
- Viernes de Fútbol

MLS Soccer Sunday is a presentation of Major League Soccer produced independently by ESPN and Fox Sports. Sunday afternoons are primarily aired on ABC and Fox while Sunday evenings primarily on ESPN, ESPN2, and Fox Sports 1. Spanish-language simulcasts are broadcast on ESPN Deportes and Fox Deportes.

As part of the current broadcast agreement between Major League Soccer and its network partners, ESPN Networks and Fox Sports each contracted to broadcast 34 weekly matches in an assigned broadcast window. In addition to the weekly broadcast window, each broadcast group gained the right to transmit their broadcasts on their respective digital broadcast service.

Additionally, ESPN Networks was granted the right to develop an over-the-top content (OTT) service consisting of all out-of-market broadcasts of any MLS match not part of the MLS Soccer Sunday broadcasts nor those of Viernes de Fútbol, the Friday evening presentation of MLS on the networks of Univision. Although the service was intended to begin with the 2015 MLS season in the first year of the new agreement, ESPN decided it could not logistically offer the service that year and MLS continued to offer its MLS Live digital service as it had previous seasons.

== On ESPN/ABC ==
MLS Soccer Sunday is telecast primarily on ESPN or ESPN2 in the 5 p.m. Eastern Time Zone broadcast window or ABC at 3 p.m. ET. Most matches are simulcast live on ESPN Deportes. The first broadcast on March 8, 2015, was the home opener of Orlando City SC and fellow expansion side New York City FC. The match, which ended in a 1–1 tie, was broadcast from the Citrus Bowl in Orlando, Florida before a crowd of 62,510 spectators.

English-language and Spanish-language feeds are carried on ESPN3.

== On Fox Sports ==
MLS Soccer Sunday is telecast primarily on FS1 and Fox Deportes in the 7 p.m. Eastern Time Zone broadcast window or Fox at 3 p.m. ET. The first broadcast on March 8, 2015, was the first match of a doubleheader featuring Sporting Kansas City and the New York Red Bulls followed by Seattle Sounders FC and New England Revolution.

== See also ==
- MLS Soccer Saturday
- MLS Primetime Thursday
- MLS Saturday
- MLS Game of the Week
- Viernes de Fútbol
- MLS on ESPN
