= MLS Primetime Thursday =

- Starring: JP Dellacamera; Rob Stone; Glenn Davis; John Harkes; Kyle Martino; Allen Hopkins; Alexi Lalas; Tommy Smyth; Julie Foudy
- Country of origin: United States

Production
- Running time: 2 hours (2.5 hours select games)

Original release
- Network: ESPN2 (2007–2008)
- Release: 2007 – 2008

MLS Primetime Thursday was the weekly presentation of Major League Soccer games on ESPN2 for the 2007 and 2008 seasons. The program was presented by Adidas.

== History ==
ESPN and MLS had previously had a contract where ESPN2 televised live games, usually on Saturday afternoons. Under the arrangement, no rights fee was paid, and MLS controlled production, advertising, and promotion. Time slots varied under the deal, secured by Soccer United Marketing's providing of rights to the FIFA World Cup.

For the 2007 season, an eight-year deal was signed with an $8 million rights fee. ESPN added several features in an attempt to improve presentation—high-definition broadcasts, a sky-cam for some matches, a virtual offside line, a ball tracer, a sideline reporter, and three commentators. For the inaugural season, 2006 FIFA World Cup announcers Dave O'Brien and Eric Wynalda served as play-by-play and analyst, respectively, with Allen Hopkins serving as the sideline reporter. Tommy Smyth was later added as a co-analyst. Glenn Davis and Rob Stone filled in for O'Brien on occasion.

For the 2008 season, JP Dellacamera and John Harkes replaced O'Brien and Wynalda as the lead team with Davis, Smyth, and Julie Foudy occasionally filling in.

Following the 2008 season, ESPN discontinued the Thursday programming, citing lagging ratings and hoping to find better lead-in programming. It was replaced by the MLS Game of the Week, which rotated among a variety of nights and time slots.

== Ratings ==
After averaging 223,000 viewers during the 2006 season, ratings increased slightly in 2007, to 289,000 viewers, including a regular-season high of 658,000 viewers for David Beckham's second regular season match. However, ratings dipped to 253,000 in 2008. Attendance often lagged, with few sellouts for the weeknight matches, with marquee club Los Angeles Galaxy unable to host home matches at the Home Depot Center on Thursdays due to its agreement with California State University, Dominguez Hills.

== Personalities ==
=== Play-by-play announcers ===
1. Dave O'Brien (2007), lead
2. JP Dellacamera (2008), lead
3. Glenn Davis (2007–2008), secondary

=== Analysts ===
1. Eric Wynalda (2007), lead
2. Tommy Smyth (2007–2008), secondary
3. John Harkes (2008), lead

=== Sideline reporter ===
1. Allen Hopkins (2007–2008)

=== Studio team ===
- Rob Stone (host, 2007–2008)
- Julie Foudy (studio analyst, 2007–2008)

== See also ==
- ESPN Major League Soccer
- MLS Game of the Week
- MLS Soccer Saturday - The game of the week for MLS on ESPN from 1996 to 2006
- MLS Saturday

Preceded by MLS Soccer Saturday; 1996-2006	ESPN2 Major League Soccer; MLS Primetime Thursday; 2007-2008	Succeeded by MLS Game of the Week
