= Soccer Night in America =

- Starring: John Strong; JP Dellacamera; Kyle Martino; Eric Wynalda; Christopher Sullivan; Brian Dunseth
- Country of origin: United States

Production
- Running time: 2 hours (2.5 hours select games)

Original release
- Network: Fox Soccer (2003–2011); Fox Sports 1 (2015–2022)
- Release: 2003 – 2022

Soccer Night in America (also known as MLS Saturday/MLS on Fox Soccer) was a weekly presentation of Major League Soccer games on FOX Soccer that began in 2003. From 2005 to 2011, FOX Soccer showed 25 to 30 live games each season, plus 2 to 3 playoff games. In 2007, MLS Saturday started showing a 30-minute pregame and a 30-minute postgame show for each game.

In 2011, MLS on Fox Soccer was rebranded as Soccer Night in America, with its production revamped to provide a viewing experience similar to NFL on Fox. However, Fox was outbid by NBC Sports Network for its MLS package for the 2012–2014 seasons.

In 2015, Soccer Night in America was again rebranded as MLS Soccer Sunday due to a new deal between Fox and ESPN, with games on Fox Sports 1 airing from 7-9 pm ET.

== See also ==
- MLS Primetime Thursday
- MLS Game of the Week
- MLS Soccer Sunday
