= Sunday Night Soccer =

Live television broadcast of weekly Major League Soccer games

- Genre: MLS game telecasts
- Countries of origin: United States; Canada
- Original language: English
- No. of seasons: 2
- No. of episodes: 31 (scheduled)

Production
- Production location: Various MLS stadiums
- Camera setup: Multi-camera
- Running time: 120–150 minutes
- Production companies: Major League Soccer; Apple Inc.

Original release
- Network: Apple TV
- Release: February 23, 2025 – present

Related
- MLS on Apple TV

Sunday Night Soccer is a primetime Major League Soccer (MLS) broadcast series that debuted during the 2025 MLS season. Airing exclusively on Sunday evenings on Apple TV, it features marquee matchups between top MLS clubs, aiming to enhance the league's visibility and provide fans with high-quality soccer entertainment. The series is accompanied by dedicated studio programming, including pre-game shows MLS Countdown and MLS La Previa, and post-game analysis shows MLS Wrap Up and MLS El Resumen.

== History ==
In January 2025, MLS announced the introduction of Sunday Night Soccer, a weekly primetime fixture designed to showcase the league's most compelling games. This initiative is part of a broader strategy to expand MLS's audience and compete with other major sports' primetime broadcasts, such as Sunday Night Football and Sunday Night Baseball. The inaugural match took place on February 23, 2025, featuring the debut of expansion team San Diego FC against the reigning MLS Cup champions, LA Galaxy.

== Broadcasting ==
Sunday Night Soccer games are available to stream for all Apple TV+ subscribers. No MLS Season Pass is required. The series is accompanied by new dedicated studio programming, including pre-game shows MLS Countdown and MLS La Previa; meanwhile, MLS Wrap Up and MLS El Resumen will shift to Sunday evenings, following Sunday Night Soccer. This move will provide viewers with a comprehensive recap and highlights of the entire week's matches.

Internationally, MLS has secured agreements with various broadcasters to air Sunday Night Soccer matches on linear television channels, aiming to expand its global footprint. Broadcasters include SBS in Australia, TNT Sports and HBO Max in Latin America, Dubai TV in the Middle East, TV3 in Spain, Sportdigital in Germany, and ENA Sports (formerly Sky Sports) in South Korea to air these Sunday night matches. These strategic partnerships are designed to attract new fans who might become MLS Season Pass subscribers in the future.
