= Kenneth Garay =

Colombian-American sports broadcaster

Kenneth Garay is currently an ESPN Sportscaster and was the lead host of the ESPN Deportes Radio show named ESPN al Despertar (Waking up with ESPN). He is currently broadcasting the morning show for ESPN Deportes Radio for the New York area, New Jersey area, and surrounding areas named Firma ESPN. He is the official Monday night football play by play commentator for ESPN Deportes Radio. Among other tasks in ESPN Deportes Radio, he is also does play by play for soccer for different leagues including the MLS. He also participates in other programs when needed, such as Futbol Picante (radio version) for ESPN Deportes Radio.

On June 29, 2021; ESPN announced that as part of its deal with the National Hockey League, Garay would serve as one of the Spanish language play-by-play announcers for its NHL coverage.

Garay is a Colombian-American born in New York, New York, with personal connections to Bucaramanga, Colombia. His favorite team is Club Atletico Bucaramanga.
