= Major League Soccer on television =

Broadcasts of top-level American professional soccer

Major League Soccer has been broadcast live in the United States nationally since the league's inception in 1996 and in Canada since 2007. As of the 2023 season, Apple Inc. is the primary global rights holder and streams every regular season and playoff match on Apple TV. Some matches are also broadcast on television via Fox Sports in the United States, and Bell Media (via TSN and RDS) in Canada.

== United States television ==
=== 1990s–2006 ===
Major League Soccer with ESPN and ABC Sports announced the league's first television rights deal on March 15, 1994, without any players, coaches, or teams in place. The three-year agreement covered English-language broadcasting for the 1996–1998 seasons, and committed 10 matches on ESPN, 25 on ESPN2, and the MLS Cup on ABC. The deal gave MLS no rights fees, but the advertising revenue was divided between the league and networks.

During the 1990s, Univision and Galavisión broadcast matches in Spanish. The original Univision deal ended in 1999. Telemundo picked up MLS in 2000, but disputes over time slots led to the network dropping MLS after the 2001 season. ABC and ESPN were left as the only MLS broadcasters in 2002.

In 2003, Fox Sports World (later Fox Soccer Channel) also became an English-language TV partner to MLS, while Fox Sports en Español became the Spanish-language partner in the same year.

=== 2007–2014 ===
In August 2006, MLS and ESPN announced an eight-year contract spanning 2007–2014 giving the league its first rights-fee agreement worth US$8 million annually. The deal gave the MLS a regular primetime slot on Thursdays, televised coverage of the first round of the MLS SuperDraft and an expanded presence on other ESPN properties, such as ESPN360 (now ESPN3) and Mobile ESPN. The agreement also placed each season's opening match, the MLS All-Star Game and the MLS Cup on ABC.

In September 2006, the media announced a deal between the Univision network and Soccer United Marketing (SUM) worth US$80 million. The network agreed to broadcast 25 MLS matches per season, ten U.S. men's national team matches and five international matches operated by SUM; although, ratings were volatile.

Disappointing ratings led to a 2008 push by ESPN to bolster its popularity through measures such as using JP Dellacamera, a veteran play-by-play soccer commentator, instead of baseball announcer Dave O'Brien, as well as an arrangement to simulcast MLS matches in Spanish on ESPN Deportes, with the intention of gaining additional Hispanic viewers with a Spanish style. ESPN programming executive Scott Guglielmino explained: "From my perspective, the only question in my mind when it comes to growth is how quickly over time MLS and its management group want to spend on players ... You’re in a worldwide market. The question is how quickly the ownership group wants to push that envelope."

After two years of low ratings, network executives decided to transfer all ABC matches to ESPN. The MLS Cup had been broadcast on ABC each year from 1996 to 2008, but with ratings declining from 1.4, in 1996 and 1997, to 0.6 in 2008, the MLS Cup was moved to ESPN at the start of 2009. The network also replaced the regular Thursday night telecast with a "game of the week" on either Wednesday, Thursday, Friday, or Saturday nights, to give MLS matches better lead-in programming and more flexibility to air better matchups.

In 2011, Fox Soccer Channel and MLS agreed to a one-year extension to televise up to 31 regular-season matches and three playoff game, in a deal worth around US$7 million. MLS Wrap was a MLS highlight show that aired on Fox Soccer Channel that was often hosted by Sean Wheelock, with analyst John Harkes.

In 2012, NBC Sports Group replaced Fox Sports as the league's second English-language broadcaster, with matches airing on NBCSN (which was available in approximately twice as many homes as Fox Soccer), and selected matches on the NBC broadcast network. NBCSN broadcast 44 matches and NBC broadcast 5 matches—the average combined audience for NBC and NBCSN's matches in 2012 was 122 percent higher than the average audience for Fox Soccer's matches in 2011. ESPN ratings also increased in 2012 from the prior year, as a number of MLS matches were shown on ESPN in 2012, instead of a primary focus on ESPN2, as had been the case previously.

=== 2015–2022 ===
On May 12, 2014, MLS announced an eight-year broadcasting deal between ESPN and Fox Sports in English, and Univision in Spanish, covering television, digital, and the possibility of radio rights. The biggest change under the new deal was the establishment of a consistent national window for each broadcaster; UniMas airs matches on Friday nights, while ESPN2 and Fox Sports 1 air matches on Sunday evenings and nights respectively (jointly promoted as Soccer Sunday). All three broadcasters will air at least 34 regular-season matches per-season during these windows. ESPN and Fox Sports will also share in English-language coverage of the playoffs, and alternate airing the All-Star Game and MLS Cup yearly. Univision will air Spanish-language coverage of the MLS Cup and All-Star Game, and exclusively air two playoff knockout-round matches per season. Matches exclusively televised by Univision include English-language commentary via second audio program. The deal also includes options for national radio rights for ESPN Radio and Fox Sports Radio, rights to United States men's national team matches for all three broadcasters, rights for ESPN International, and an option for ESPN to take over the distribution of the league's out-of-market package.

ESPN and Fox Sports pay a combined $75 million per season, and Univision pays $15 million per-season. In Canada TSN and TVA pay a combined $15m per season. Totaling at around $105 million per-season, nearly five times the value of the league's previous deal, it is the highest-valued television rights deal in MLS history. Commissioner Garber stated at the announcement that the new contracts were "another strong indicator of the League's continued growth and the overall fan interest in our sport".

In March 2017, it was announced that Facebook had reached a deal to stream English-language coverage of the nationally televised matches allotted to Univision. The streams would include interactive features, while MLS also announced that it would stream a news program known as Matchday Live on its Facebook page to complement the new deal.

Prior to the 2018 season, ESPN invoked its option to take over the out-of-market streaming rights to Major League Soccer. The MLS Live service was discontinued, and out-of-market matches became an overall component of the new ESPN+ subscription streaming service that launched in April 2018 (with MLS Live temporarily made available for free prior to the service's official launch). Twitter replaced Facebook as the English streaming rightsholder for Univision's matches under a three-year deal.

The 2018 season also saw significant developments in regional broadcast rights, as Chicago Fire and newly established Los Angeles FC chose to sell their regional television rights exclusively to subscription streaming services (the aforementioned ESPN+, and YouTube TV, respectively), rather than a local broadcaster or regional sports network. Several teams (including Real Salt Lake and the Seattle Sounders FC) also reached in-market streaming deals alongside a flagship television broadcaster. In 2019, D.C. United similarly signed with FloSports (replacing Sinclair Broadcast Group), however the partnership was met with criticism over the more-limited availability of the broadcasts, as well as promised supplemental coverage that never materialized. The team broke away from FloSports prior to the final game of the season, and re-signed Sinclair for the 2020 season. Also in 2020, Chicago Fire FC returned to regional linear television with a multi-year deal with WGN-TV, concurrent with the final year of its agreement with ESPN+.

=== 2023–present ===
MLS requested that its teams not negotiate regional television rights beyond the 2022 season, suggesting that the league was considering switching to a centralized model for its broadcast rights (more akin to the NFL and European club leagues).

MLS is operating on a 10-year broadcasting deal with Apple Inc. that began the 2023 season, under which the company holds the global over-the-top streaming rights to all MLS and Leagues Cup matches, and selected MLS Next and MLS Next Pro matches. Initially, the games streamed exclusively via MLS Season Pass, a subscription service offered through the Apple TV app. Season Pass was a separate offering from Apple's main streaming service Apple TV+, but a package of MLS and Leagues Cup matches would stream for Apple TV+ subscribers, and a subset of these matches (potentially over 40%) would be available for free. Season ticket holders for MLS teams also received free access to the service. The acquisition was Apple's second major foray into sports broadcast rights, after having acquired a package of Friday-night Major League Baseball games for Apple TV+ in 2022.

Under the deal, MLS assumed the production of all match telecasts, as part of a partnership with IMG and NEP Group. Teams will no longer be allowed to sell regional broadcast rights to live matches (although the contract provides the option for teams to sub-license tape delayed broadcasts of matches on a regional basis, provided they are broadcast on at least a 48-hour delay), and no match will be subject to blackouts. Commentary will be available in English and Spanish, as well as French for matches involving Canadian teams. The majority of matches will be played on Wednesday and Saturday nights, with scheduled kickoffs primarily occurring at 7:30 p.m. local time.

A sub-licensing agreement was reached with Fox Sports, under which it would air 34 matches in the regular season, eight in the postseason, and each MLS Cup until 2026 on Fox, FS1, and Fox Deportes. ESPN and Univision will no longer be involved in the televising of MLS matches, with ESPN severing ties after being the primary partner for the league's entire history and Univision having done so in the 1990s and from 2007 to 2022. Univision, however, will televise select Leagues Cup matches, including exclusive linear coverage of the final. Both ESPN and Univision are believed to have left negotiations due to conflicts over the Apple contract; in addition to both companies operating streaming platforms of their own (ESPN+ and Vix respectively), Jonathan Tannenwald of The Philadelphia Inquirer reported that ESPN disagreed with Apple putting the games which would have been part of an ESPN sublicense deal outside of the MLS Season Pass paywall, while Josh Sim of SportsPro Media speculated that Univision disapproved of Apple presenting Spanish-language coverage of MLS games.

In 2025, some changes began to emerge in broadcasting arrangements. That year, MLS expanded availability of MLS Season Pass beyond Apple platforms by announcing carriage deals with Comcast and DirecTV. Charlotte FC became the first MLS team to invoke an allowance for teams to sub-license tape delayed broadcasts of matches to broadcasters, with the team partnering with WAXN-TV (airing them in late-night time slots). FC Dallas later reached a similar agreement with KDFI, airing them on Tuesday nights as FC Dallas Rewind.

Late in 2025, it was reported that Apple had amended its current MLS contract to end after the 2028–29 season. Under the new terms, Apple will increase its rights payments over the remaining seasons, paying around $50 million more through 2029 than it would have under the original terms. In the 2026 season, the MLS Season Pass subscription was discontinued, and MLS content was moved into the Apple TV subscription instead.

== Canadian television ==
Coverage of MLS expanded into Canada in 2007 with the addition of Toronto FC. From 2007 to 2010, CBC, Sportsnet, and later GolTV Canada (owned by team parent company Maple Leaf Sports & Entertainment), broadcast Toronto FC matches nationwide, and GolTV carried broadcasts of selected regular-season matches not involving Toronto FC.

Bell Media has held national English-language rights to Major League Soccer in Canada since 2011, and reached a 5-year extension for English-language rights only beginning in the 2017 season. Matches primarily air on the TSN networks, and beginning in 2017, selected matches are simulcast on the terrestrial CTV network. As of the 2017 season, TVA Sports holds the national French-language rights to Major League Soccer in Canada.

As in the United States, the individual Canadian clubs have also negotiated separate broadcast deals for matches not aired under the Bell Media national contract (although there are no blackouts of these "regional" broadcasts outside of the team's territory). TSN and Sportsnet formerly split coverage of Toronto FC regional matches (their parent companies hold a joint majority stake in MLSE), TVA Sports airs Montreal Impact matches in a separate deal, and TSN broadcasts the Vancouver Whitecaps in a separate deal. In the 2017 season, Sportsnet discontinued its TFC coverage, and its matches moved exclusively to TSN.

In the 2018 season, DAZN took over rights to out-of-market streaming of matches as part of its overall service, with live and on-demand coverage of all-U.S., matches, and on-demand streaming of matches featuring Canadian clubs 48 hours after their original broadcast.

Canadian television rights were included in the global rights deal between MLS and Apple Inc. that began with the 2023 season. All games involving Canadian teams will feature French language commentary, in addition to commentary feeds in English and Spanish. The league will simulcast some games on traditional linear television networks such as TSN and RDS.

== Current broadcasting contracts ==
=== Global ===
Network	Current contract	Annual rights fee	Regular season games	Playoff games	Language	Ref
Apple TV	2023–2029	$250 million	All matches	All matches	English, Spanish, French	

=== United States ===
Network	Current contract	Annual rights fee	Regular season games	Playoff games	Language	Ref
Fox/FS1	2023–2026	TBA	34 (Note: At least 15 matches on Fox and the remainder on FS1)	8	English	
Fox Deportes	2023–2026	TBA	34	8	Spanish	

=== Canada ===
Network	Current contract	Annual rights fee	Regular season games	Playoff games	Language	Ref
TSN	2023–2026	TBA	~68 (Note: TSN and RDS will average two matches per week including at least one match featuring a Canadian team)	8	English	
RDS	2023–2026	TBA	~68	8	French	

=== Rest of the world ===
- South Korea
  - ENA Sports (Note: Formerly known as "Sky Sports", the channel was renamed "ENA Sports" on October 1, 2025 (KST).) (Sunday Night Soccer (Note: Billed as "Monday Morning Football" in ENA Sports' listings.) matches only (Note: Starting with 2025 Matchday 4 Atlanta United FC v. Inter Miami CF.))
  - Coupang Play (Remaining Los Angeles FC matches in the 2025 season, (Note: Starting with 2025 Matchday 33 San Jose Earthquakes v. Los Angeles FC.) streaming rights)
  - SpoTV Prime (Note: SpoTV operates SpoTV Now streaming service, but as their broadcasting rights for the MLS matches are limited to the linear TV, the matches are not available to stream on the said platform.) (Remaining Los Angeles FC matches in the 2025 season, linear TV rights)

== Ratings and viewers ==
=== Regular season ===
Year	English language			Spanish language		
Year	Channel	Telecasts	Viewers (Ratings)	Channel	Telecasts	Viewers (Ratings)
2006	ESPN2	21	263,000 (0.2)			
2006	Fox Soccer					
2007	ESPN2	25	289,000 (0.2)	TeleFutura	24	282,000
2007	Fox Soccer					
2008	ESPN2	26	253,000 (0.2)	TeleFutura	26	254,000
2008	Fox Soccer*		30,000 (0.1)			
2009	ESPN2	26	299,000	TeleFutura	24	229,000
2009	Fox Soccer	34	53,000			
2010	ESPN2	25	253,000	TeleFutura	23	211,000
2010	Fox Soccer	31	53,000			
2011	ESPN2	20	290,000	Galavisión	18	72,000
2011	Fox Soccer	27	70,000	TeleFutura	12	233,000
2012	ESPN / ESPN2	20	311,000	Galavisión	20	57,000
2012	NBCSN	40	125,000			
2013	ESPN / ESPN2	20	220,000 (0.1)	UniMás	23	223,000
2013	NBCSN	37	112,000 (0.1)			
2014	ESPN2	20	240,000 (0.2)	UniMás	23	218,000
2014	NBCSN	38	142,000 (0.1)			
2015	ESPN (8) / ESPN2 (26)	34	245,000	UniMás/UDN	42	244,000
2015	FS1	34	197,000			
2016	ESPN (29) / ESPN2 (5)	34	274,000	UniMás/UDN	34+	245,000
2016	Fox (5) / FS1 (29)	34	224,000			
2016	Fox	5	696,000			
2017	ESPN(26) / ESPN2(3)	29	272,000	UniMás(18) / UDN (6)	24	265,000
2017	Fox (7) / FS1 (27)	34	236,000			
2017	Fox	7	644,000			
2018	ESPN(28) / ESPN2(3)	31	241,000	Univision(13) UniMás/UDN (12)	25	292,000
2018	Fox (6) / FS1 (27)	33	296,000			
2018	Fox	6	988,000			

Notes:

- Although the viewing numbers on ESPN2 declined by 36,000 from 2007 to 2008, ESPN began simulcasting MLS matches on ESPN Deportes in 2008, attracting an average of 40,000 viewers.
- Fox Soccer began getting ratings in October 2008. The Fox Soccer numbers for 2008 represent only the last four matches of the season. Viewership numbers prior to October 2008 are unavailable.
- FOX OTA- (Over-The-Air) average viewing numbers includes the FOX Deportes Spanish language Simulcast average viewing number for the 2016–2017 seasons.
- In 2019 MLS averaged 277,000 viewers for the regular season across ESPN networks per ESPN Press Room Press Release.
- In 2020 COVID affected season MLS averaged 257,000 viewers across ESPN networks, viewership average for Fox Sports and Univision networks were unavailable for the 2020 season.

=== MLS cable viewership average ===
Season	Avg. viewers	Change	Ref
2012	164,000	—	
2013	185,000	+13%	
2014	200,000	+8%	
2015	229,000	+15%	
2016	248,000	+8%	
2017	258,000	+4%	
2018	276,000	+6%	
2019	268,000	−3%	
2020	257,000	−4%	
2021	285,000	+11%	

Notes:

- Cable viewership average includes MLS average Television Viewing Audience across the National Broadcast Networks in which matches air.
- Numbers do not include streaming viewership.

=== MLS Cup Finals ===
1996–2008

Year	Network	Rating	Viewers (millions)
1996	ABC	1.4	3.1
1997	ABC	1.4	2.6
1998	ABC	1.0	2.2
1999	ABC	0.7	1.3
2000	ABC	0.7	1.2
2001	ABC	1.0	2.0
2002	ABC	0.8	1.2
2003	ABC	0.6	0.9
2004	ABC	0.8	1.3
2005	ABC	0.8	1.1
2006	ABC	0.8	1.2
2007	ABC/TeleFutura	0.8	1.1
2008	ABC/TeleFutura	0.6	0.9

2009–2022

Year	Network	Rating	Viewers (millions)
2009	ESPN/Galavision	0.7	1.1
2010	ESPN/Galavision	0.4	0.7
2011	ESPN/Galavision	0.8	1.0
2012	ESPN/UniMás	0.7	0.8
2013	ESPN/UniMás	0.5	1.0
2014	ESPN/UniMás	0.6	1.9
2015	ESPN/UniMás	0.4	1.2
2016	Fox/UniMás	0.9	2.0
2017	ESPN/UniMás/Univision Deportes	0.5	1.1
2018	Fox/UniMás/Univision Deportes	0.9	1.8
2019	ABC/Univision/TUDN	0.7	1.3
2020	Fox/UniMás/TUDN	0.8	1.7
2021	ABC/UniMás/TUDN	0.8	1.5
2022	Fox/Univision/TUDN	TBD	2.2

2023–present
MLS Season Pass viewership is not available

Year	Network	Rating	Viewers (millions)
2023	Fox/Fox Deportes/Season Pass (Note: MLS Season Pass viewership is not available)	0.4	0.9
2024	Fox/Fox Deportes/Season Pass	N/A	0.5

== Single-game records ==
Regular season
No.	Viewers	Date	Network	Matchup
1	1,894,000	November 25, 2021	FOX	Portland Timbers vs. Colorado Rapids
2	1,609,000	July 7, 2019	FOX	Atlanta United vs New York Red Bulls
3	1,558,000	July 15, 2018	FOX	Atlanta United vs Seattle Sounders FC
4	1,159,000	June 30, 2018	FOX	Seattle Sounders FC vs Portland Timbers
5	1,109,000	July 1, 2018	FOX	Toronto FC vs New York Red Bulls

== Previous national broadcasting networks ==
- Univision, 1996–1999, 2015–2022
- Telemundo, 2000–2001
- Fox Soccer, 2003–2011
- ABC, 1996–2008, 2019–2022
- HDNet
- TeleFutura/UniMás, 2007–2022
- CBC, 2007–2009
- NBC Sports, 2012–2014
- ESPN/ESPN2, 1996–2022
- TUDN, 2015–2022
- TVA Sports, 2017–2022

== Previous regional broadcasting networks ==
Team	Network	Team	Network
Atlanta United FC	Bally Sports South; Bally Sports Southeast	CF Montréal	TVA Sports
Austin FC	KNVA; KXAN-TV; KBVO	Nashville SC	WZTV; WUXP; WNAB
Charlotte FC	WAXN; WSOC	New England Revolution	WSBK-TV; WBZ-TV
Chicago Fire	WGN Sports	New York City FC	YES Network; WPIX
Colorado Rapids	Altitude	New York Red Bulls	MSG Network
Columbus Crew	Bally Sports Ohio; Bally Sports Great Lakes	Orlando City SC	WRBW
D.C. United	NBC Sports Washington	Philadelphia Union	WPHL-TV; WPVI-TV; NBC Sports Philadelphia
FC Cincinnati	WSTR-TV	Portland Timbers	Root Sports Northwest; KPTV; KPDX
FC Dallas	KTXA	Real Salt Lake	KMYU
Houston Dynamo	AT&T SportsNet Southwest	San Jose Earthquakes	NBC Sports California; NBC Sports Bay Area; KSTS
Inter Miami CF	WBFS; WFOR	Seattle Sounders FC	Root Sports Northwest; KCPQ; KZJO; Amazon Prime Video
Los Angeles FC	KCOP	Sporting Kansas City	KMCI-TV
LA Galaxy	Spectrum SportsNet	Toronto FC	TSN
Minnesota United FC	Bally Sports North; WUCW	Vancouver Whitecaps FC	TSN

- NOTE: Former regional broadcasters that are currently affiliated with FOX continue to air extremely limited MLS matches involving their local team through the FOX linear package.

== MLS broadcasts ==
- MLS ExtraTime
- MLS Game of the Week
- MLS Soccer Saturday
- MLS Soccer Wednesday
- MLS Wrap
- MLS on Apple TV
- MLS Season Pass
- MLS on Fox

== See also ==
- Major League Soccer#Media coverage
- Soccer in the United States#Soccer on TV
- Major professional sports leagues in the United States and Canada#Television exposure
- List of current Major League Soccer broadcasters
- Sports broadcasting contracts in the United States
- English football on television
- World Series television ratings
- Stanley Cup Finals television ratings
- NBA Finals television ratings
- Major League Baseball television contracts
- National Basketball Association on television
- National Hockey League on television
