= Dave O'Brien (sportscaster) =

American sportscaster (born 1963)

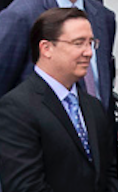
- O'Brien in 2019
- Born: August 3, 1963 (age 63); Quincy, Massachusetts, U.S.
- Education: Syracuse University
- Years active: 1987–present
- Sports commentary career
- Teams: Boston Red Sox; Atlantic Coast Conference
- Genre: Play-by-play
- Sports: Major League Baseball; College football College basketball
- Employer: NESN; ESPN Inc.

David O'Brien (born August 3, 1963), nicknamed "OB", is an American sportscaster who is a lead play-by-play announcer on the New England Sports Network (NESN) for telecasts of the Boston Red Sox of Major League Baseball (MLB), and for college football and college basketball games aired on the ESPN Inc.-owned ACC Network. He has previously broadcast for MLB's Atlanta Braves, Florida Marlins, and New York Mets, and has announced other sports including basketball, football, and soccer.

== Early life ==
Born in Quincy, Massachusetts, O'Brien grew up in Marshfield, Massachusetts, and later New Hampshire before receiving a degree in broadcasting from the S. I. Newhouse School of Public Communications at Syracuse University in 1986.

== Broadcasting career ==
From 1987 to 1992, O'Brien worked as a sportscaster in Atlanta, Georgia, calling play-by-play for MLB's Atlanta Braves in 1990–91 as well as college football and basketball games for Georgia and Miami. He earned the Georgia Associated Press' "Best Sports Play-by-Play" accolade in 1988 and 1991. O'Brien broadcast for the Florida Marlins from the team's 1993 inaugural year through 2001, including their first World Series win in 1997. He has also occasionally called National Football League games for the Atlanta Falcons.

O'Brien recorded play-by-play "commentary" for the High Heat Major League Baseball video game series for its 2002, 2003, and 2004 installments, along with color commentator Chuck Valenches. O'Brien provided commentary for MLB's international coverage of the World Series from 2004 until 2009. O'Brien was the television voice of the New York Mets on WPIX-TV from 2003 through 2005.

=== ESPN ===
O'Brien worked for ESPN from 2002 through 2017, handling play-by-play of MLB, NBA, college basketball, and soccer (including Major League Soccer's MLS Primetime Thursday and United States men's national soccer team telecasts). Prior to the 2005 season, O'Brien was denied permission by ESPN to join the Chicago Cubs' broadcast team. In 2019, O'Brien returned to call college football games for the inaugural season of the ESPN Inc.-owned ACC Network, partnering with fellow New England native Tim Hasselbeck.

=== FIFA World Cup ===
O'Brien joined Marcelo Balboa on the primary broadcast team for the 2006 FIFA World Cup coverage on ESPN and ABC Sports, despite having no experience calling soccer matches prior to that year. Because The Walt Disney Company, owner of both television outlets, retained control over on-air talent, the appointment of O'Brien as the main play-by-play voice was made over the objections of Soccer United Marketing, who wanted JP Dellacamera to continue in that role. Disney stated that their broadcast strategy was intended, in voice and style, to target the vast majority of Americans who do not follow the sport on a regular basis. Mispronunciation and incorrect addressing of names, misuse of soccer terminology, and lack of insight into tactics and history plagued the telecasts, resulting in heavy criticism from English-speaking soccer fans, with some either muting commentary or watching the tournament in Spanish on Univision instead.

=== Boston Red Sox ===
In 2007, O'Brien joined the Boston Red Sox Radio Network, calling games alongside primary play-by-play announcer Joe Castiglione. In 2011, O'Brien became the primary play-by-play announcer with Castiglione becoming the secondary announcer. On August 25, 2015, it was announced that O'Brien would be the primary play-by-play announcer for Red Sox telecasts on NESN beginning in 2016, replacing Don Orsillo. In August 2026, it was announced that O'Brien would remained in his role with NESN through the Red Sox' 2028 season.

=== Notable broadcasts ===
O'Brien won the Achievements in Radio (A.I.R.) award for Best Play-by-Play for his call of Mark McGwire's 59th home run in 1998.

O'Brien called a triple-overtime college basketball game between Oklahoma State and Texas on January 16, 2007. He called the game—which Oklahoma State won, 105–103—on ESPN2 alongside Rick Majerus.

August 4, 2007 – O'Brien called play-by-play for ESPN's August 4 broadcast of the game between the San Francisco Giants and the San Diego Padres in which Barry Bonds tied the major league all-time home run record with his 755th home run.

The 2-1. Swing and a high fly ball, left field. Did he get it? Backing up, Hairston and it is gone! He has done it! There's number 755! Barry Bonds has tied the greatest individual record in American sports! And now it's just Barry Bonds and Hank Aaron, side by side.

August 7, 2007 – O'Brien also called the game between the Giants and the Washington Nationals in which Bonds hit his 756th home run, breaking the record that had been held by Hank Aaron for more than 33 years.

Bacsik's 3-2 again, there's a swing and a high fly ball, right center field! Back it goes, racing back, Logan jumping up, and that ball is gone! Number 756! Barry Bonds stands alone! And on the night of August 7, 2007 in San Francisco, California, Barry Lamar Bonds has hit more home runs than any major leaguer in the history of baseball.

October 13, 2013 – O'Brien also called David Ortiz's grand slam off Joaquin Benoit in Game 2 of the 2013 American League Championship Series between the Boston Red Sox and the Detroit Tigers for WEEI-FM.

Red Sox trailing 5-1 and Papi gets in. The big right hander Benoit delivers. Swing and a high deep drive into right field, that one's scalded to right! Hunter on the move, racing back, it's over his head! IT'S GONE, IT'S INTO THE BULLPEN! THIS GAME IS TIED! THIS GAME IS TIED! DAVID ORTIZ! DAVID ORTIZ! DAVID ORTIZ!

March 31, 2017 – O'Brien called the Mississippi State Bulldogs women's basketball team's epic Final Four victory over the UConn Huskies, snapping the latter's record 111-game winning streak and advancing the Bulldogs to the tournament's championship game. O'Brien's call of the last shot:

Dillingham across midcourt, Dillingham with it. 5 to get off a shot. William on the drive, pull up pull up! GOT IT! SHE GOT IT! SHE GOT IT! ONE OF THE GREAT UPSETS IN HISTORY! MISSISSIPPI STATE IN OVERTIME AT THE BUZZER! MORGAN WILLIAM! MISSISSIPPI STATE HAS ENDED THE STREAK AT 111 GAMES! IT'S OVER!

July 11, 2025 – O'Brien called Ceddanne Rafaela's walk off home run in the bottom of the 9th for the Boston Red Sox in a game against the Tampa Bay Rays. The home run extended the Red Sox winning streak to eight games.

A swing and a drive! Oh, he killed it! It's out of here! It's gone! Ceddanne does it! The Sox win it! They walk it off against Tampa Bay! Are you kidding me?! That is the sound of eight straight at Fenway!

July 18, 2026 – O'Brien called Wilyer Abreu's go-ahead, two-run home run in the bottom of the 7th for the Boston Red Sox and the Tampa Bay Rays. The home run gave the Red Sox a one-run lead, after they had entered the inning trailing by three runs. It was Abreu's second home run of the game, and his fourth in two games. The Red Sox would go on to win the game, their 12th straight at the time.

A swing and a drive! Right field! He's crushed another one! YOU GOTTA BE KIDDING ME! YOU GOTTA BE KIDDING ME!

== Personal life ==
O'Brien has been married to his high school sweetheart, Debbie Nason O'Brien, for 40 years. The couple have a son, Michael, and two daughters, Samantha and Katie. They lived in West Palm Beach, Florida, before moving to Salem, New Hampshire.

Media offices
Preceded by JP Dellacamera	MLS Cup play-by-play announcer 2006–2007	Succeeded by JP Dellacamera
