= Mónica González (soccer) =

Mexican footballer (born 1978)

Personal information
- Date of birth: 10 October 1978 (age 48)
- Place of birth: Corpus Christi, Texas, United States
- Height: 1.81 m (5 ft 11 in)
- Positions: Forward; defender

Youth career
- Plano East High School

College career
Years	Team	Apps	(Gls)
1997–2001	Notre Dame Fighting Irish	95	(17)

Senior career*
Years	Team	Apps	(Gls)
2002–2003	Boston Breakers	26	(1)

International career
1998–2011	Mexico	83	(10)

Managerial career
- 2019: Houston Dash (Assistant)
- * Club domestic league appearances and goals

Mónica Christine González Canales (born 10 October 1978) is a football commentator and former player. She played college soccer for the University of Notre Dame Fighting Irish. Although born in the United States, she also played for the Mexico women's national football team from 1998 to 2011 and for the Boston Breakers in the Women's United Soccer Association from 2002 to 2003. Her positions were forward and defender. She has been an analyst and announcer for ESPN since 2011. She is currently an assistant coach for the Houston Dash in the National Women's Soccer League.

== Early life ==
González is the daughter of Arturo and Becky González. She has three brothers, one of whom played soccer at the United States Naval Academy. She played soccer on boy's teams in Corpus Christi and, later, basketball and soccer at Plano East Senior High School in Plano, Texas, near Dallas

== University ==
González played soccer for the University of Notre Dame in the 1997 and 1999–2001 seasons. She missed playing in 1998 due to a knee injury. In 1997 and 1999 she played forward. In 2000, she became a left outside defender and in 2001 she played central defender. She scored 17 goals and had 17 assists. She was a second team All American and second-team Academic All-American in 2001. She compiled a 3.39 grade point average on a 4.0 scale, majoring in management information systems and Spanish.

== Professional career ==
González was the eleventh player picked in the 2002 Women's United Soccer Association draft, selected by the Boston Breakers. She played with Boston as a defender in 2002 and 2003 and was named to the WUSA All-Star team in 2003. WUSA ceased operations after the 2003 season.

In 2009, González was contracted to play with the Chicago Red Eleven in the USL W-League, a semi-professional soccer team.

== International play ==
In 1998, while still a Freshman at Notre Dame, González was invited to become a founding member of an organized Mexico national team. She was a member of Mexico's team at the 1999 FIFA Women's World Cup, the first appearance of the Mexico women's in the World Cup. She was captain of the Mexico team from 2003 to 2007, participating in the 2004 Olympic Games, also the first appearance of women for Mexico in the Olympics. González dropped out of law school to prepare for the 2007 World Cup, but Mexico failed to qualify. She retired from the Mexico team in October 2007.

González re-joined the Mexican team in 2010 to prepare for the 2011 Women's World Cup in Germany. "I had to sell my car so I could have enough money to train for six months, she said, "adding that Mexican players were paid only 4,000 pesos per month" (less than $400). However, she was cut from the team shortly before the World Cup began.

During her career from 1998 to 2011, González was capped in 83 international games and scored 10 goals.

== Sports commentator ==
Two days after she was cut from the Mexico National Team, González was hired by ESPN as a studio analyst for the 2011 Women's World Cup. She has since become a sideline reporter for Major League Soccer, an analyst for the Longhorn Network, and a contributor to ESPN3. She has also announced games for NBC Universo and Fox Deportes, and, in 2016, was the only woman calling games in the UEFA Champions League.

== Coaching career ==
In January 2019, Gonzalez was named an assistant coach for the Houston Dash.

== Other activities ==
González moved to Chicago in 2009 to attempt to play soccer with the Chicago Red Stars but failed to make the team. To earn a living, she gave soccer clinics in the Hispanic community and this grew into the creation of a non-profit organization, Gonzo Soccer Academy, with the dual purpose of teaching Hispanic girls to play soccer and to improve their life skills. She later expanded the organization to Texas, Mexico, and Colombia. González in 2013 was living in Mexico City, Mexico.
