= Viernes de Fútbol =

- Presented by: See below
- Country of origin: United States

Production
- Running time: 2.0–2.5 hours per match

Original release
- Network: UniMás, Univision Deportes Network (Spanish, English available on SAP, Facebook, Twitter, Instagram and YouTube)
- Release: March 6, 2015

Related
- MLS Soccer Sunday

Viernes de Fútbol (Spanish for Soccer Friday) is the Friday night broadcast of Major League Soccer produced by Univision Deportes for broadcast by UniMás and the Univision Deportes Network. Started in 2015, it is the first and (as of 2016) only exclusive broadcast of any major professional sports league in the United States and Canada on a Spanish language television network. English language commentary is available using the second audio program and on Twitter.

== Personalities ==
Presenter	Role	Years served
Spanish language
Jorge Pérez Navarro	Play-by-play	2015
Diego Balado	Analyst	2015
José Luis López Salido	Play-by-play	2015
Raúl Guzmán	Play-by-Play	2015
Iván Kasanzew	Host	2015
Jorge Calvo		2015
English language
Ramsés Sandoval	Play-by-play	2015–present
Paul Caligiuri	Analyst	2015
Keith Costigan	Analyst	2015–present

== See also ==
- MLS Soccer Sunday
