= Julie Foudy =

American soccer player (born 1971)

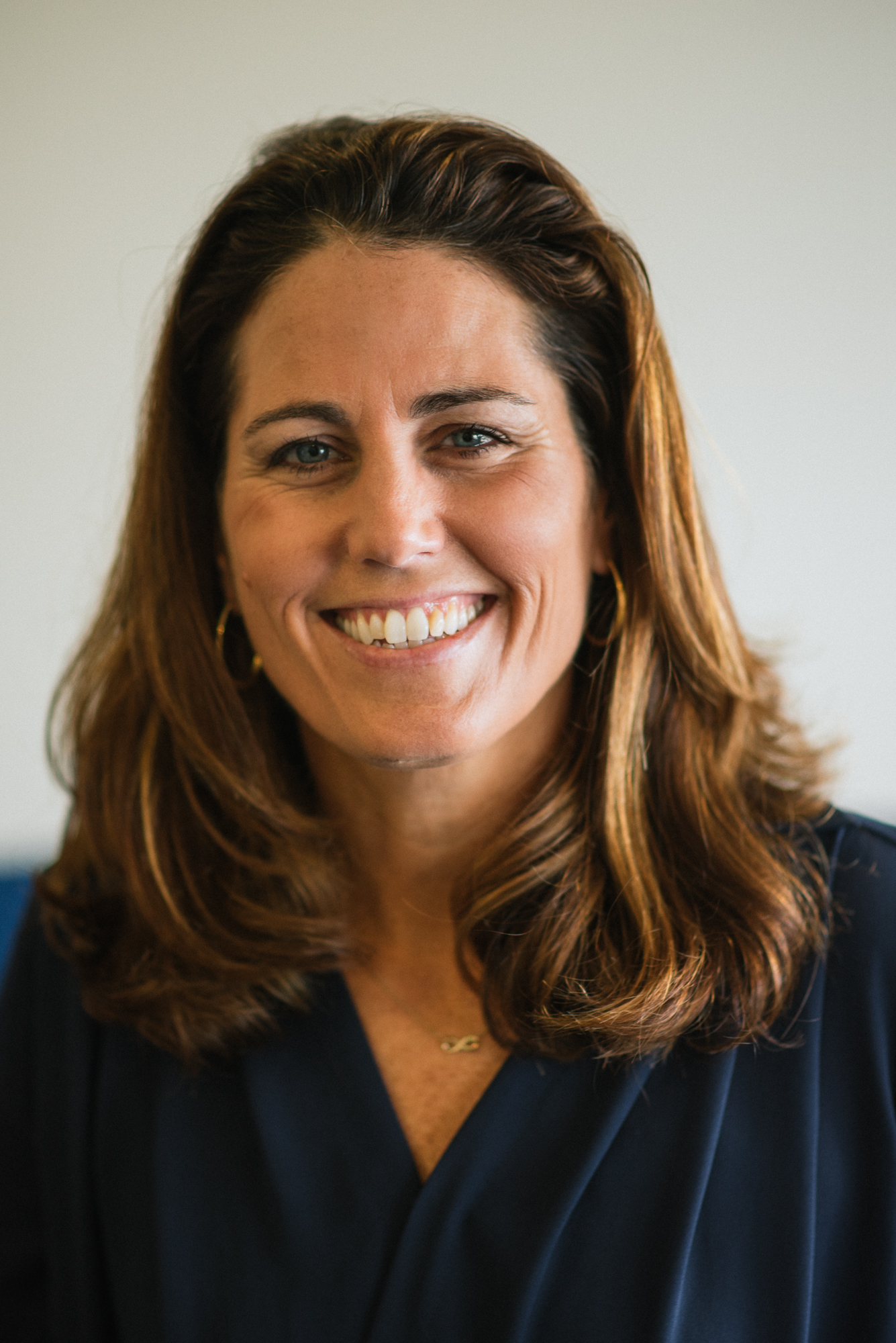
- Foudy in 2014

Personal information
- Full name: Julie Maurine Foudy
- Date of birth: January 23, 1971 (age 55)
- Place of birth: San Diego, California, U.S.
- Height: 5 ft 6 in (1.68 m)
- Position: Midfielder

College career
Years	Team	Apps	(Gls)
1989–1992	Stanford Cardinal	78	(52)

Senior career*
Years	Team	Apps	(Gls)
1993	Sacramento Storm		
1994	Tyresö FF		
1995–1998	Sacramento Storm		
2001–2003	San Diego Spirit	59	(8)

International career
1988–2004	United States	274	(45)
Medal record
Women's football (soccer)
Representing the United States
Olympic Games
Gold medal – first place	1996 Atlanta	Team competition
Gold medal – first place	2004 Athens	Team competition
Silver medal – second place	2000 Sydney	Team competition
FIFA Women's World Cup
Gold medal – first place	1991 China	Team competition
Gold medal – first place	1999 USA	Team competition
Bronze medal – third place	1995 Sweden	Team competition
Bronze medal – third place	2003 USA	Team competition
- * Club domestic league appearances and goals

Julie Maurine Foudy (/ˈfaʊdi/ FOW-dee; born January 23, 1971) is an American former professional soccer player who played as a midfielder. She played for the United States women's national soccer team from 1988 to 2004, serving as co-captain from 1991 to 2000 and as captain from 2000 to 2004. With the U.S. team, Foudy won the FIFA Women's World Cup in 1991 and 1999, and won the gold medal at the Summer Olympics in 1996 and 2004. Foudy finished her international career with 274 caps. In 1997, she was the first American and first woman to receive the FIFA Fair Play Award.

From 2000 to 2002, Foudy served as president of the Women's Sports Foundation. In 2006, she co-founded the Julie Foudy Sports Leadership Academy, an organization focused on developing leadership skills in teenage girls. In 2007, she was inducted into the National Soccer Hall of Fame. She is currently a sports analyst, reporter and the primary color commentator for women's soccer telecasts on ESPN.

Foudy is the author of Choose to Matter: Being Courageously and Fabulously YOU. She appeared in the HBO documentary Dare to Dream: The Story of the U.S. Women's Soccer Team. She was the executive producer of the documentary short, An Equal Playing Field, and she produced the ESPN Nine for IX episode The 99ers, which features players from U.S. team that won the 1999 Women's World Cup. Foudy is a part of the ownership group of Angel City FC of the National Women's Soccer League.

== Early life ==
Foudy was born on January 23, 1971, in San Diego, California and raised in Mission Viejo. She played soccer at Mission Viejo High School, where she was a two-time First-Team All-American. She was named the Los Angeles Times High School Player of the 1980s and the Player of the Year in southern California for three straight years (1987–1989).

== College career ==
Foudy attended Stanford University, where she helped the Stanford Cardinal women's soccer team reach the NCAA playoffs four years in a row. She was a four-time NSCAA All-American and finished her collegiate career with 52 goals, 32 assists and 136 points in 78 appearances. She was named the Cardinal Player of the Year for three consecutive years (1989–1991). She was named the 1989 Soccer America Freshman of the Year and the 1991 Soccer America Player of the Year, and was a two-time finalist for the Hermann Trophy. She was the recipient of the Stanford Outstanding Freshman, Sophomore and Junior Athlete Award and was named to Soccer America's College Team of the Decade for the 1990s.

== Club and international career ==
=== Club ===
Foudy played for the semi-professional team Sacramento Storm, which won the 1993, 1995 and 1997 California State Amateur championship. In 1994, she played for the Swedish club Tyresö FF with her national teammates Michelle Akers, Mary Harvey, and Kristine Lilly. In the Women's United Soccer Association professional league (WUSA), Foudy was captain of the San Diego Spirit. She made 59 regular season appearances, scoring eight goals and providing 13 assists. When the WUSA suspended operations in September 2003, Foudy was the official player's representative to the ongoing efforts to resurrect the league.

=== International ===
Foudy began traveling with the United States women's national soccer team at the age of 16. She attended the 1988 FIFA Women's Invitation Tournament as a non-playing substitute, then made her first international appearance on July 29, 1988 at the Mundialito. Foudy played in four FIFA Women's World Cup tournaments, winning in 1991 and 1999. She played in three Summer Olympic Games, winning the gold medal in 1996 and 2004, and winning silver in 2000. Following the 2004 Olympics, Foudy joined her teammates Mia Hamm, Joy Fawcett and Brandi Chastain in a 10-game "farewell tour" that marked the end of what the media labeled the "golden era" of U.S. women's soccer. The St. Petersburg Times said the team, "... changed the face of women's soccer".

== International goals ==
No.	Date	Venue	Opponent	Score	Result	Competition
1.	18 April 1991	Port-au-Prince, Haiti	Mexico	5–0	5–0	1991 CONCACAF Women's Championship
2.	24 November 1991	Foshan, China	Chinese Taipei	4–0	7–0	1991 FIFA Women's World Cup
3.	21 August 1994	Montreal, Canada	Canada	5–0	6–0	1994 CONCACAF Women's Championship
4.	10 June 1995	Helsingborg, Sweden	Australia	1–1	4–1	1995 FIFA Women's World Cup
5.	19 June 1999	East Rutherford, United States	Denmark	2–0	3–0	1999 FIFA Women's World Cup
6.	17 September 2000	Melbourne, Australia	China	1–0	1–1	2000 Summer Olympics
7.	25 September 2003	Philadelphia, United States	Nigeria	5–0	5–0	2003 FIFA Women's World Cup

== Sports broadcasting career ==
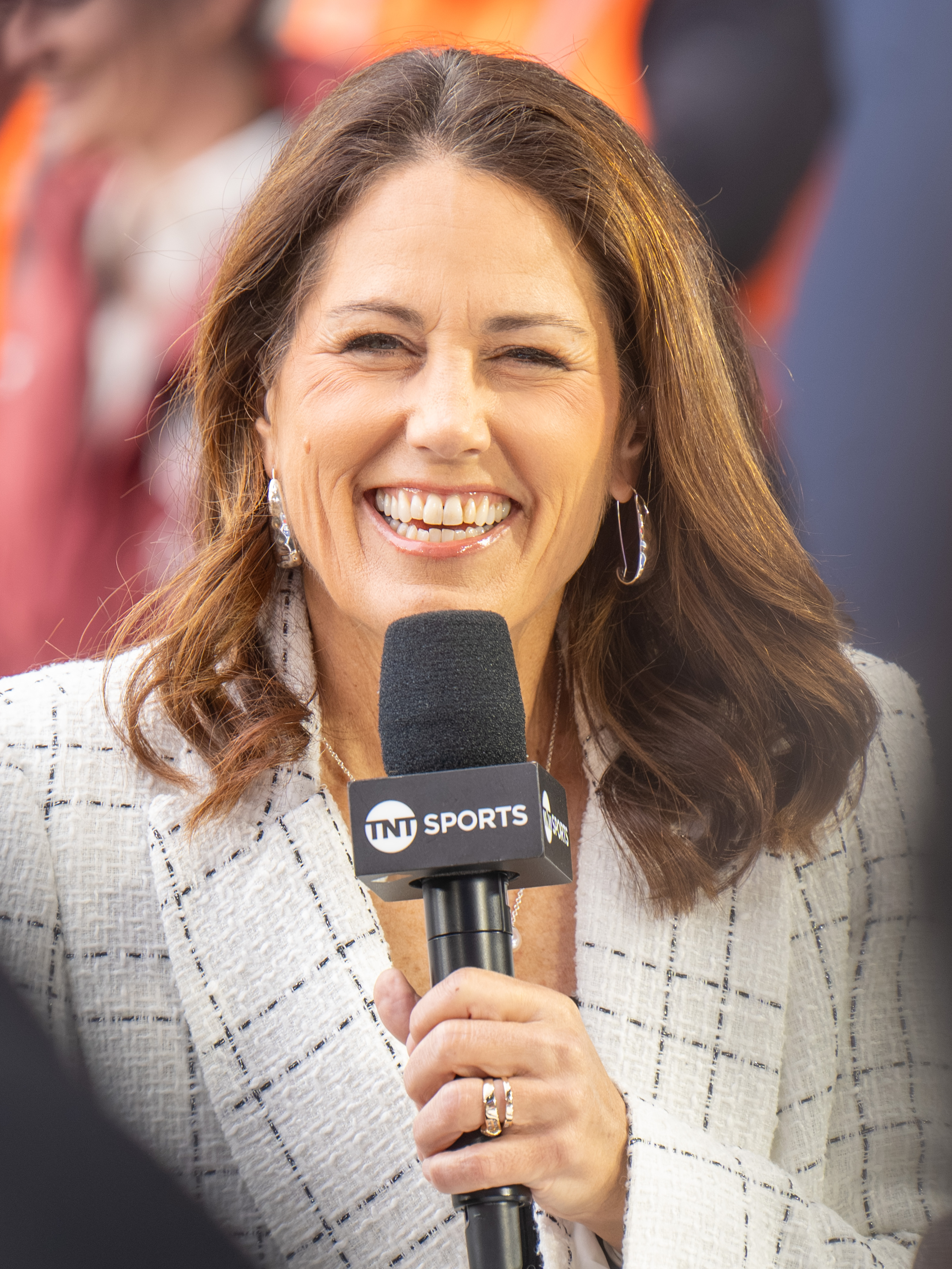
Foudy in 2026

Foudy has worked as an in-studio sports analyst for ABC, ESPN and ESPN2's coverage of the 2006 FIFA World Cup and UEFA Euro 2008, and has provided on-air commentary and analysis during United States Women's National Team matches since then. She co-anchored ABC and ESPN telecasts of the 2007 FIFA Women's World Cup and the 2007 season of Major League Soccer, including the MLS Cup. She appeared as a pundit for the ESPN coverage of the UEFA Euro 2008 championship finals with Andy Gray and Tommy Smyth. For the 2010 FIFA World Cup, she served as a reporter and analyst, doing features, interviews and analysis in South Africa for ESPN. Foudy is also a reporter for ESPN's investigative program, Outside the Lines. She served as a sports desk reporter for NBC Sports coverage of the 2008 Summer Olympics. She has filled in for Dana Jacobson on ESPN First Take. Since late-2010, Foudy has been paired with Glenn Davis or Ian Darke on ESPN's primary broadcast team for women's soccer telecasts, as was the case for the 2011 FIFA Women's World Cup.

On August 20, 2013, ESPN Films teamed up with Foudy to premiere their new Nine for IX film on the 1999 Women's World Cup Team, The 99ers. The film, directed by Erin Leyden, and produced by Foudy, tells the story of the 1999 United States women's national soccer team, using Foudy's personal behind the scenes footage. Reuniting key players from the 1999 squad and talking with current U.S. players as well, the film examines how women's soccer, and women's sports in general, have changed since the 1999 Women's World Cup.

Foudy worked as ESPN's reporter from the 2018 Winter Olympics and the 2019 FIFA Women's World Cup. Foudy is the host of the podcast Laughter Permitted, which interviews sports "trailblazers". In 2023, Foudy joined WBD Sports to work as the lead match analyst for USWNT and USMNT matches. She continues to work for ESPN as well.

== Julie Foudy Sports Leadership Academy ==
The Julie Foudy Sports Leadership Academy (JFSLA) is an organization focused on sports and leadership for girls founded in 2006 by Foudy and her husband Ian Sawyers. The academy hosts one-week combined sports camp (soccer or lacrosse) and leadership academy for girls age 12–18. The staff includes Olympic gold medalists, World Cup champions and other leaders. The camps are focused on leadership building "on and off the field". According to Foudy, “...having a productive successful team is not about one person or about one part of that team. It's a successful team which means everyone contributes. When I look back over my U.S. team career our most successful teams which won World Cups and Olympic medals had one common denominator, we all contributed to positive team chemistry.” While conducting a youth soccer clinic in Tampa in 2006, she said that the success of the U.S. women's soccer team in the FIFA World Cup tournaments and Summer Olympics had transformed the way soccer federations internationally think about women's soccer.

== Honors and awards ==
Foudy was selected for induction into the National Soccer Hall of Fame in 2007 alongside former teammate Mia Hamm. Foudy and Hamm's induction was the first all-female class.

In 1997, Foudy received the FIFA Fair Play Award for her work against child labor, the first American and first woman to win the award. For her accomplishments in soccer in the United States, Foudy was awarded the Golden Blazer in 2015 by Men in Blazers. The American Library Association selected Foudy as Honorary Chair of National Library Week 2017.

== Personal and political activism ==
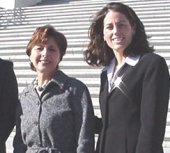
Foudy with Senator Barbara Boxer in 2001

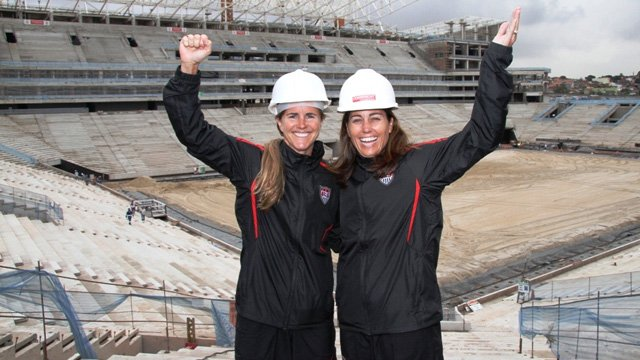
Brandi Chastain and Julie Foudy in Brazil in 2014

Foudy has been active in a number of political causes relating to women's rights and workers' rights. In 1998, she received the FIFA Fair Play Award in recognition of her advocacy against child labor in sports equipment manufacturing. The year before she had made a trip to Pakistan to inspect working conditions at a factory where soccer balls were manufactured for her then-sponsor, Reebok.

In 2002, Foudy, a former president of the Women's Sports Foundation, was named by United States Secretary of Education Rod Paige to the Commission on Opportunity in Athletics, a panel charged with reviewing the effects and implementation of the landmark 1972 Title IX legislation. Foudy and fellow commission member Donna de Varona refused to sign the report authored by the commission, saying that the report downplayed the persistence of gender-based discrimination in school athletics and that some of its recommendations would allow schools to get away with discrimination. They released a minority report recommending that current anti-discrimination policies remain in place. Paige ultimately decided to only pursue the recommendations that earned unanimous support from the commission.

Foudy and Ian Sawyers have been married since 1995. Foudy gave birth to their first child, a daughter named Isabel Ann, on January 1, 2007. Their second child, a son named Declan, was born in December 2008.

In 2014, Brandi Chastain and Foudy worked together to host clinics for young women in Brazil to encourage young women to play soccer.

Foudy appeared in the HBO documentary Dare to Dream: The Story of the U.S. Women's Soccer Team. She also appears in the HBO Max documentary film LFG.

== See also ==
- List of Olympic medalists in football
- List of 1996 Summer Olympics medal winners
- List of 2000 Summer Olympics medal winners
- List of 2004 Summer Olympics medal winners
- List of footballers with 100 or more caps
- List of MLS Cup broadcasters
- List of people from San Diego
- List of Stanford University people

Preceded by Carla Overbeck	WNT captain 2000–2004	Succeeded by Kristine Lilly
