= Allen Hopkins (soccer commentator) =

American soccer sportscaster

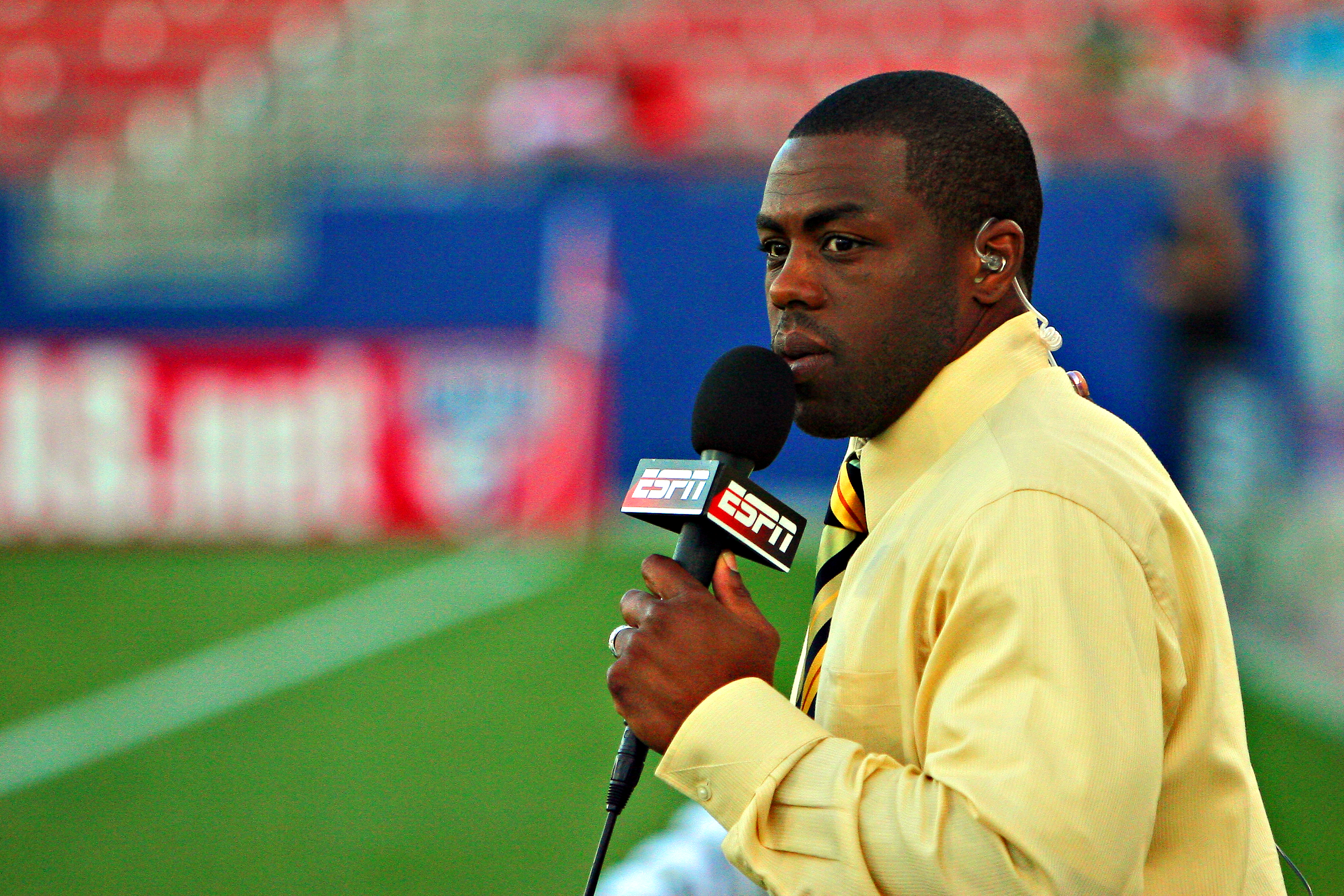
- Education: Westmont College
- Occupation: Sportscaster
- Employer(s): ESPN, Fox Soccer Channel
- Known for: Soccer broadcasting, "Road to Brazil"

Allen Hopkins is an American soccer sportscaster. His current duties include coverage of Major League Soccer for ESPN, as well as MLS' C.D. Chivas USA.

After a successful collegiate soccer career at Westmont College in Santa Barbara, the NAIA's all-time winningest men's soccer program, he continued playing in both the 3rd (USISL) and 2nd Divisions (A-League) domestically. A two-year stint at San Diego State as the assistant men's soccer coach led to a position at Soccer America Magazine and it was shortly thereafter that his broadcast career began.

He initially came to ESPN to assist with their coverage of the 2006 FIFA World Cup, as well as to be the sideline reporter for MLS Primetime Thursday. He also worked on other soccer coverage on ESPN. Hopkins previously worked for Fox Soccer Channel and its predecessor, Fox Sports World, covering games in MLS and the German Bundesliga.

He has also hosted the "Road To Brazil" series of videos produced by U.S. Soccer which chronicles the United States Men's National Soccer Team as they attempt to qualify for the 2014 FIFA World Cup
