= Glenn Davis (sportscaster) =

American sportscaster

- Education: Davis & Elkins College
- Occupations: Retired soccer player; Sports commentator; Radio personality
- Employer(s): ESPN, FOX Sports, Houston Dynamo
- Known for: Radio: Soccer Matters with Glenn Davis; Wednesdays 7-9 p.m. CT on ESPN 97.5 FM; Television: Houston Dynamo game broadcasts on KUBE 57 (play-by-play announcer)
- Relatives: Hannah Jeter (niece)
Association football career
- Position: Defender
Youth career
- Boston University Terriers
- Davis & Elkins Senators
Senior career*
Years	Team	Apps	(Gls)
1983	Pennsylvania Stoners		
1984	Houston Dynamos		
- Columbus Capitals
1988	Ft. Lauderdale Strikers		
- Albany Capitals
Managerial career
- Houston Hurricanes Youth Soccer Club
- * Club domestic league appearances and goals

Glenn Davis is an American sportscaster. He is best known as the lead play-by-play announcer for local TV broadcasts of the Houston Dynamo FC and his weekly radio show titled "Soccer Matters with Glenn Davis" on KFNC.

Davis has called World Cup matches for ESPN, and Fox Sports, Olympic soccer for NBC, and MLS matches on several national and local channels. Additionally, he has called professional women's soccer matches and men and women's collegiate soccer.

A professional soccer player in the 1980s, Davis has also coached youth soccer and works as a consultant and spokesperson. His charitable work includes a youth soccer camp titled "Kick Cancer" that features former and current soccer players as coaches to raise money for pediatric cancer research.

== Soccer career ==
Raised in Chatham Township, New Jersey, Davis played prep soccer at Chatham Township High School, leading the 1977 team that won the Group I state championship and completed the season with a 22–0 record. Davis grew up playing youth soccer in New Jersey under the tutelage of Scottish coach Tom MacDonald, whom he credits for instilling the passion and excitement of the sport of soccer into his blood. Another influence was Davis' older brother Conn who was an All-American goalkeeper at Davis' alma-mater, Davis & Elkins College in West Virginia.

Davis played collegiate soccer at Boston University and later at Davis & Elkins College, where he was a two-time All-WVIAC selection and a NAIA All-American.

Davis began his professional career as a central defender for the Pennsylvania Stoners of the American Soccer League, with whom he reached the 1983 American Soccer League Final in his rookie season. The Stoners finished runner-up to the Jacksonville Tea Men, coached at the time by former Manchester United F.C. striker Dennis Viollet, after falling 1–0 in a decisive game three. Davis scored and was named 'Defensive Player of the Game' in game 1.

The following year Davis played with the United Soccer League's Houston Dynamos. The Dynamos advanced to the 1984 league championship game but fell in the penalty shootout to the Fort Lauderdale Sun, whose squad featured former England captain Dave Watson, Scottish international Asa Hartford, and former Leicester City star Keith Weller. Davis earned All-League honors for the 1984 season. The following season Davis captained the team and played against well-known international clubs like Sheffield United F.C., Middlesbrough F.C., Linfield F.C., Glentoran F.C., C.D. FAS, Olympiacos, and the U.S. national team, whom the Dynamos defeated 1–0.

Davis would go on to play for the Columbus Capitals indoor soccer team and then returned to outdoor soccer with the Albany Capitals. He also played for the Ft. Lauderdale Strikers against UNAM Pumas and Alianza of El Salvador in the 1988 Marlboro Cup where his team finished third.

== Broadcasting ==
Davis began his broadcasting career in 1994 on Home Sports Entertainment (HSE) as an analyst for the Houston Hotshots indoor soccer team. He now is a nationally recognized soccer broadcaster having been a part of ESPN's World Cup coverage in 2002, 2006, 2010 and NBC Olympic coverage during the Beijing 2008 and London 2012 games.

During his career he has called games in El Salvador, Guatemala, Mexico and Germany. At the start of Fox Sports World (now Fox Soccer Channel) he was a regular calling twice weekly Serie A games from Italy. He has called CONCACAF Champions League, CONCACAF Gold Cup and various tournaments internationally. Davis is a rarity in that he is a former professional soccer player that transitioned from the role of analyst to play by play which he believes gave him a different perspective.

Davis hosts Dynamo All Access on Yahoo Sports 1560 and Soccer Matters on ESPN 97.5 FM. He originally started his radio show on 90.1 KPFT public radio in Houston.

Davis used the platform to promote the sport and the return of professional soccer to Houston, which ultimately occurred with the San Jose Earthquakes being re-located to Houston in December 2005. He also created a Dynamo post-game radio show, modeled after other pro sports teams' show, which takes place live outside BBVA Compass Stadium after games. Davis is currently the number 2 announcer for MLS on ESPN, and also commentates on international matches for Fox. Davis is the lead play-by-play man for college soccer on ESPN.

In January 2026, Houston Dynamos announced that Davis would not be on the broadcasting team for the 2026 Major League Soccer season. Davis stated that this was due to his criticism of the Dynamos' owners.

== TV credits ==
- FIFA World Cup: 2002 (ABC/ESPN), 2006 (ABC/ESPN), 2010 (ESPN Radio), 2018 (Fox Sports)
- MLS: 2002–present (ESPN, Fox Soccer)
- Summer Olympics (Soccer): 2008 (NBC Sports), 2012 (NBC Sports)
- FIFA Women's World Cup: 2015 (Fox Sports), 2019 (Fox Sports)
- UEFA Champions League: 2002-2009 (ESPN), 2011-2018 (Fox Sports), 2015-present (ESPN Radio)
- USMNT/USWNT Games: 2002–present (ESPN)
- Houston Dynamo Games: 2007–2025 (KUBE-TV)
- Serie A: 1997-2005 (Fox Soccer)

== Writing ==
Davis was a twice weekly columnist for the Houston Chronicle for seven years helping to create awareness for the game. He maintains the website GlennDavisSoccer.com which provides fresh content daily. He has also written columns for Fox Sports Houston and ESPN online.

== Coaching ==
Davis helped form the Hurricanes soccer club with former teammate Tony Johnson. He helped run the club over 12 years as a director with numerous players moving to the college and professional ranks. Davis established relationships with Mexican Clubs Atlas and Monterrey while utilizing local men's leagues to play his best players. Numerous Mexican clubs would come to Houston to compete including Atlas, UNAM, Monterrey and more. Five players were members of the Uconn National Championship team of 2000. Davis had an USSF "A" coaching license.

== Personal life ==
Davis is committed to the fight against Children's Cancer creating "Kick Cancer" soccer camps that take place in December each year with all proceeds going to cancer research and benefitting the Texas Children's Hospital through the 501 C Charity Curing Children's Cancer Fund (cccfund.org). Davis credits the entire soccer community for providing their expertise, time and experience to growing KICK CANCER yearly. Davis sits on the board of Curing Children's Cancer Fund and was presented with a Lifetime Achievement Award from Davis and Elkins College in 2006. His brother Conn was a college All American goalkeeper who was drafted by the Washington Diplomats of the NASL but had his career cut short due to knee injury. His niece is Ralph Lauren and Sports Illustrated Swimsuit Issue cover model Hannah Davis, who is also the wife of Derek Jeter.
