= Rob Stone (sportscaster) =

American sports commentator (born 1969)

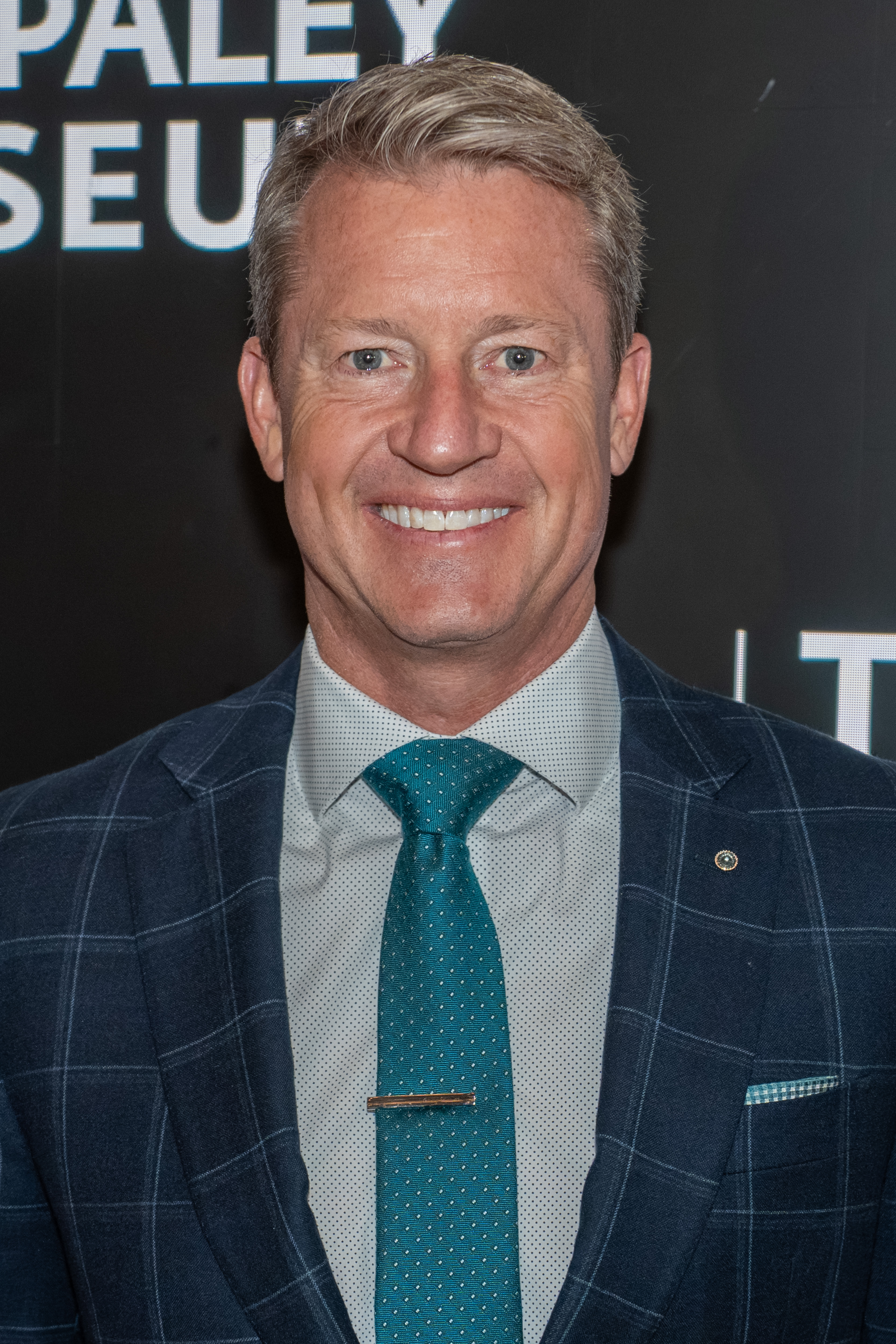
- Stone in 2026
- Born: April 15, 1969 (age 57); Simsbury, Connecticut, U.S.
- Occupation: Sportscaster
- Years active: 1992–present
- Spouse: Lynn Carson (m. 1999)
- Children: 4

Robert Stone (born April 15, 1969) is an American sports commentator for Fox Sports, covering various sports including Major League Soccer (MLS), NCAA and NFL football, and the Professional Bowlers Association (PBA). Stone previously covered sports for ESPN. A WWE fan, Stone briefly won the WWE 24/7 Championship during a Fox promotional event, becoming the first non-WWE Superstar to win the championship.

== Early life and career ==
A native of Simsbury, Connecticut, Stone graduated with a Bachelor of Arts in English from Colgate University in 1991. He was a four-year letterman on the Raiders men's soccer team who completed his collegiate career as the university's all-time assist leader with 15 (currently tied for second). In his senior year, he was co-captain, the Raiders' Most Valuable Player and First Team All-Patriot League in the conference's inaugural season.

Stone originally hired on at ESPN in 1992 as a production assistant, working on SportsCenter and other shows. The following year, Stone went to WFXL-TV in Albany, Georgia; he worked there two years as a sports anchor and later as sports director. In 1995, he went to WTOG in Tampa, Florida, as a weekend sports anchor and sports reporter, primarily covering stories on the Tampa Bay Buccaneers. He has also worked as an analyst for the Tampa Bay Mutiny soccer team for SportsChannel Florida.

== ESPN ==
Stone returned to ESPN in the summer of 1997. He worked on select ESPN College Football and college basketball telecasts. He also worked on ESPN's Major League Soccer coverage and MLS Primetime Thursday, as well as their coverage of the 2006 FIFA World Cup. Stone was also one of the commentators for the 2006 World Series of Darts. In 2007, he became a regular contributor to big horse racing events. He covered the Kentucky Derby, the Preakness, the Belmont Stakes, the Irish Derby, the Breeders Cup and other key horse racing events. Stone left the telecasts after the Breeders Cup. On June 30, 2008, he appeared as a guest host on ESPN's Around the Horn. He substituted for Tony Reali as the host of the show while Reali was getting married. Stone was also one of the network's main college football sideline reporters.

=== PBA Bowling ===
Stone replaced Dave Ryan as the lead play-by-play announcer for PBA bowling telecasts on ESPN prior to the 2007–08 Denny's PBA Tour. He would continue in this position on PBA telecasts through the end of 2011, after which he left voluntarily to take a position with Fox Sports. He was replaced on the remaining (unrecorded) events for the 2011–12 season by veteran announcer Gary Thorne.

==== "HAMBONE!" ====
Stone originated the catchphrase "hambone!", which he took to shouting when any bowler rolled four strikes in a row in a game. (It was unknown to Stone that in some bowling circles, including USBC youth leagues, an actual hambone is two consecutive strikes rather than four.) According to an interview with Stone on PBA.com, the phrase started out as a fad when he casually asked color commentator Randy Pedersen on the air, "if three strikes is a 'turkey', why isn't there a name for four strikes?" Stone launched the hambone phrase in the following week's TV finals, and it soon took on a life all its own despite criticism from traditionalists, some media and (at first) even a few bowlers on the PBA tour. In the 2007 CLR Windy City Classic title match between Brad Angelo and Robert Smith, Stone said to his fellow commentator Randy Pedersen, "I think I'm going to call four strikes in a row a hambone. I think I'm going to force it on bowling." The eventual winner Smith would bowl Stone's first hambone called on-air.

Though many bowlers were slow to embrace the catchphrase, it has become extremely popular with PBA management, and even more so with bowling fans who now bring "hambone" placards to flash on camera whenever someone rolls four straight strikes. In a February 17, 2008, match, Hall of Fame bowler Pete Weber, after rolling a fourth consecutive strike, pointed to Stone in the TV booth and shouted over the cheers, "Rob Stone, here's your hambone!" while performing his trademark chop. Even PBA's official bowling app, PBA Challenge, refers to four strikes as a hambone during game play.

== Fox Sports ==
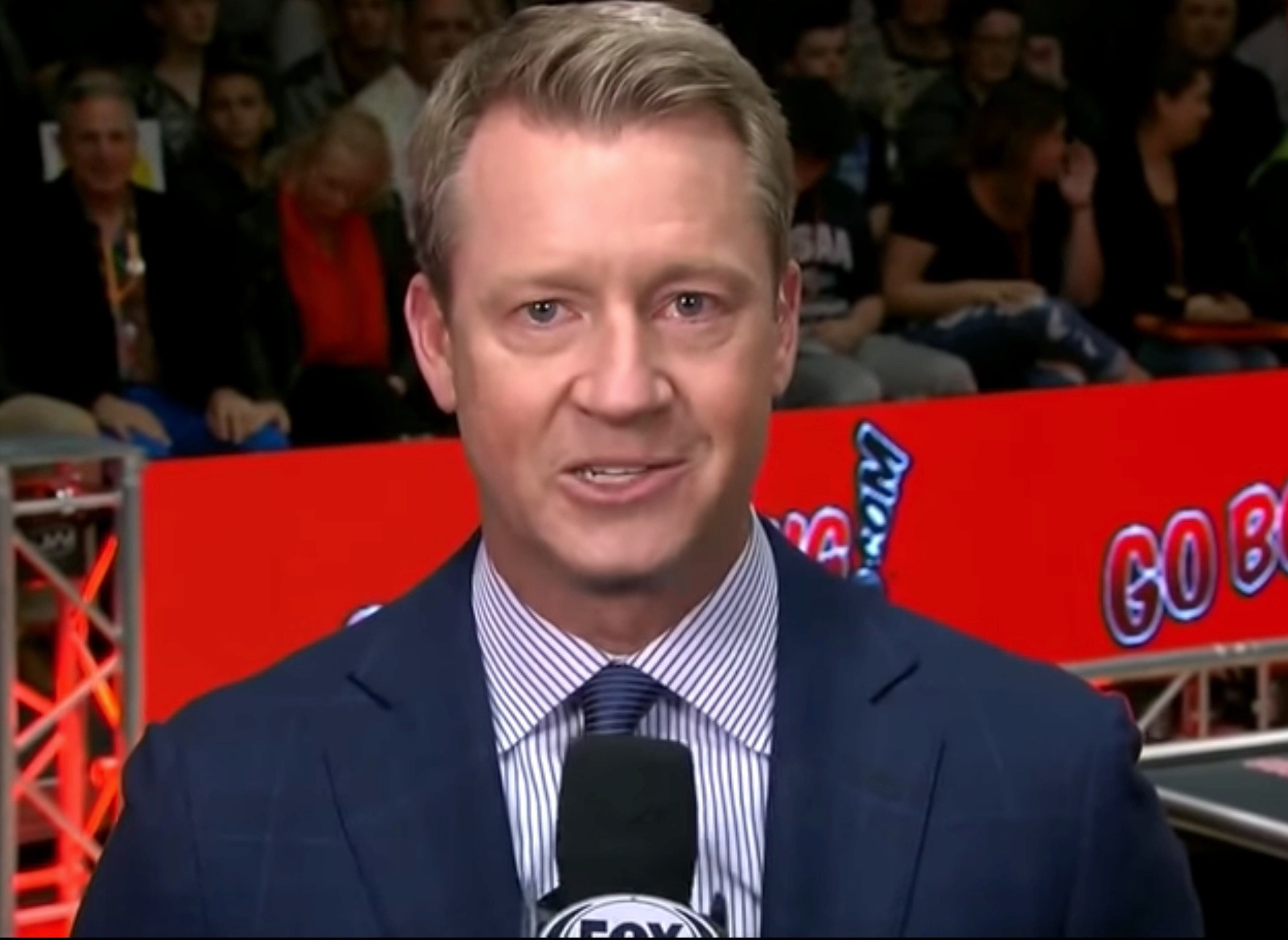
Stone in 2018

In January 2012, Stone left ESPN to take the position of lead studio host for Fox soccer broadcasts. He went on to host all soccer programs and events for Fox Sports Media Group (FSMG) stations, which include Fox Sports and FX. He later became studio host for Fox college football and basketball broadcasts, as well as a substitute host for Fox's coverage of Major League Baseball.

In August 2018, the PBA announced that Stone would return to covering professional bowling events when TV coverage moved from ESPN to Fox Sports for the 2019 season.

On August 23, 2019, Stone briefly became the WWE 24/7 Champion, pinning R-Truth on the set of the Fox College Football pregame show, only to lose it to Elias seconds later.^{1} He became the first non-WWE performer to win a title.

== Stone-isms ==
- "The American" (proudly stamping reminders to all soccer viewers, listeners, players and future players, our stars are bright, though he would also refer to Scottish soccer player Robert Snodgrass as "The American" when covering Premier League highlights).
- "Back on the strike train!" (sometimes said after a bowler rolls a strike following a spare or open frame.)
- "Drop and give me ten!" (sometimes when a bowler rolls a strike.)
- "Back-to-back jacks!" (when a bowler rolls two strikes in a row)
- "Show me those signs ...[city/state]!" (said after shouting "Hambone!")
- "YAHTZEE!!" or "Drops the nickel!" (5 strikes in a row)
- "Crack open the six-pack!" (six strikes in a row)
- "Adds the extra point to the touchdown." (seven strikes in a row)
- "The Bo Derek!" (ten strikes in a row; see 10 (film))
- "Messenger....!!" (a runaway pin about to hit another pin)
- "WE'VE GOT BONUS BOWLING!!" (when a bowling match ties and goes to a roll-off)
- "its 7 love" (on the first game of 2011 college football season)

== Personal life ==
Stone married Tampa Bay news reporter Lynn Carson on September 11, 1999, and they have four children.

In 2018, Stone was inducted into the Connecticut Soccer Hall of Fame.

== Championships and accomplishments ==
- Connecticut Soccer Hall of Fame
  - Class of 2018
- WWE
  - WWE 24/7 Championship^{1} (1 time)
