= MLS on Apple TV =

Major League Soccer telecasts

- Genre: Sports
- Countries of origin: United States, Canada
- Original languages: English, Spanish, French

Production
- Production company: MLS Productions

Original release
- Network: Apple TV
- Release: February 25, 2023 – present

MLS on Apple TV is a presentation of Major League Soccer carried by Apple TV (formerly Apple TV+). Introduced in the 2023 season, it encompasses coverage of all MLS matches, as well as the Leagues Cup, selected MLS Next and MLS Next Pro matches, studio programs, and other video content (including match replays and original programming).

In 2023, Apple Inc. acquired the global over-the-top streaming rights to the league as part of a 10-year media rights agreement; under the new contracts, regionally televised matches were also discontinued, hence all matches stream globally with no blackout restrictions.

Initially, all MLS content was part of a standalone subscription service known as MLS Season Pass; this package was separate from Apple TV+, although discounts were also available for Apple TV subscribers. Selected matches were made available to Apple TV+ subscribers, and some matches were also carried for free on the Apple TV app and other platforms without a subscription. A non-exclusive package of matches was sold to Fox Sports in the United States and Bell Media in Canada, to maintain a presence for the league on linear television and to promote the service.

In 2025, MLS began to distribute MLS Season Pass to consumers via selected television providers in the United States. For the 2026 season, Apple discontinued the separate MLS Season Pass subscription and integrated all MLS content into the Apple TV service.

== History ==
MLS Season Pass
- Developer: Apple Inc.
- Launched: February 1, 2023 (3 years ago)
- Discontinued: December 6, 2025 (10 months ago)
- Platforms: Apple TV app; Web at tv.apple.com
- Pricing model: US$14.99 per month; CA$19.99 per month; £14.99 per month; €14.99 per month
- Website: mlssoccer.com/season-pass

MLS had requested that its teams not negotiate regional television rights to their matches beyond the 2022 season, suggesting that the league was considering switching to a centralized model for its media rights (more akin to the National Football League and European club leagues such as the Premier League) after its present national television agreements with ESPN, Fox Sports, and Univision expire at the same time.

On June 14, 2022, MLS announced a 10-year broadcasting deal with Apple Inc. taking effect in the 2023 season, under which it would hold the global over-the-top media rights to the league. It marked the second major foray by Apple into professional sports rights, after having launched Major League Baseball's Friday Night Baseball earlier that year.

The name and United States pricing of the service was announced on November 16, 2022, with availability beginning February 1, 2023, for the start of the season on February 25, 2023.

To maintain a presence on linear television that would promote the service, MLS reached four-year, non-exclusive rights agreements with Fox Sports (United States for Fox and Fox Deportes) and Bell Media (Canada for TSN and RDS) to carry packages of MLS matches on their networks. The contract ended the league's long-term associations with long-time English and Spanish rightsholders ESPN and Univision; ESPN had been one of Major League Soccer's main media partners since its inception. Univision continues to televise select Leagues Cup matches, including exclusive linear coverage of the final. ESPN and Univision reportedly declined to renew their contracts due to objections to aspects of the Apple contract, as both companies also operate competing streaming platforms (ESPN+—which previously held out-of-market streaming rights—and Vix, respectively), and they would no longer hold exclusive rights to the matches they televise.

In 2024, Apple reached an agreement with U.S. Soccer to air the quarterfinals, semifinals and final of the 2024 U.S. Open Cup.

On November 14, 2025, alongside a related announcement that MLS would shift to a summer-to-spring schedule in 2027 to align itself with European soccer leagues, it was reported that Apple had amended its current MLS contract to end in the 2028–29 season. Under the new terms, Apple will increase its rights payments over the remaining seasons, paying around $50 million more through 2029 than it would have under the original terms.

== Distribution ==
MLS Season Pass was sold on a subscription basis via the Apple TV app, either monthly or per-season; the U.S. price was set at US$14.99 per month or $99 per season. MLS Season Pass was separate from and did not require an Apple TV subscription (formerly Apple TV+), but discounts were available to Apple TV subscribers. Season ticketholders of MLS teams also receive MLS Season Pass for free. A selection of matches throughout the 2023 season streamed free-of-charge; during the opening weekend of the 2023 season, all matches streamed for free, while at least six matches per-week were scheduled during the first weeks of the season afterward. Later weeks had as few as two free matches.

As it did for Amazon Prime Video's Thursday Night Football in the NFL, DirecTV acquired rights to distribute MLS Season Pass for its commercial subscribers, ensuring the matches' availability to venues (such as bars and restaurants) not readily equipped to handle streaming-only broadcasts. A one-year subscription to MLS Season Pass was offered by T-Mobile US to their subscribers in February 2023 through the T-Mobile Tuesdays app. A similar offer was introduced in June 2023 by Optus Sport, a sports channel in Australia.

From the 2025 season, DirecTV renewed its rights to distribute MLS Season Pass for multiple seasons; with the renewal, the provider added the right to distribute the package to residential customers. A similar agreement was reached with Comcast to distribute the service via Xfinity; as part of the agreement, all Xfinity subscribers were also given access to the MLS 360 whiparound show. In both cases, MLS Season Pass broadcasts would appear on channels within the providers' program guides. A new game of the week broadcast known as Sunday Night Soccer was made available to all Apple TV subscribers, and Apple held a promotion with Electronic Arts to stream four matches for free within its mobile game EA Sports FC.

During the 2025 MLS Cup playoffs, Apple made all matches available to Apple TV subscribers. On November 13, 2025, it was announced that the MLS Season Pass subscription would be discontinued permamently for the 2026 season, with all MLS content being available as part of the main Apple TV subscription.

== Production ==
Apple TV carries all MLS regular season and playoff matches live and on-demand, and is the exclusive carrier of all matches not otherwise sub-licensed to a linear broadcaster. It also carries all Leagues Cup matches, and selected MLS Next and MLS Next Pro matches. As teams can no longer sell packages of matches for regional broadcasts, there are henceforth no blackouts of out-of-market matches.

Beginning in the 2023 season, all MLS match telecasts are now produced in-house by the league as part of a joint venture between IMG and NEP Group. All matches are produced in 1080p high definition with 5.1 surround sound, and utilize "enhanced data elements". Match commentary is available in English and Spanish, as well as French for matches involving Canadian teams (CF Montréal, Toronto FC, Vancouver Whitecaps FC). Local radio broadcasts are also available as an option.

MLS produces three studio shows; the pre-match show MLS Countdown, MLS 360 (which carries "whiparound" coverage of each Saturday matchday), and the highlights show MLS Wrap-Up. The studio programs were originally produced at NEP Group's Metropolis Studios, a 7,000-square-foot (650 m^{2}) studio in Manhattan, New York City, with adjacent facilities for English and Spanish control rooms. The video feeds are transmitted to an NEP Group data center in Dallas for encoding and distributed from an Apple facility in Van Nuys, California. The service also offered on-demand content such as classic matches, team-produced videos and original series, such as The Ritual, a docuseries about the fan cultures of Major League Soccer teams.

MLS Productions relocated to studios at the Stamford, Connecticut, headquarters of WWE (owned by publicly traded Endeavor subsidiary TKO Group Holdings) in 2025, consolidating match production and other in-house production previously conducted from the MLS headquarters. The new facilities also enabled more centralization of production for matches, such as graphics (allowing for feeds to be customized with dedicated graphics for specific languages such as Spanish), and a small number of matches being produced remotely with a remote integration model (REMI) from NEP Vista (formerly Vista Worldlink) studios in Florida using off-site commentators.

== Announcers ==
Apple TV uses an in-house staff of commentary teams, with specific commentators often assigned to matches on a regional basis to reduce travel, and provide familiarity to viewers.

== Viewership ==
According to the Sports Business Journal, the service surpassed one million subscribers in July 2023, including free subscriptions provided to T-Mobile customers and team season ticket members. The spike was attributed to the high-profile signing of Lionel Messi by Inter Miami CF. Data collected by analytics company Antenna found a major spike in subscriptions for Messi's debut match for Miami, with 110,000 new subscriptions in the United States alone.

Ahead of the 2025 MLS All-Star Game, MLS Commissioner Don Garber stated that MLS Season Pass was receiving an average of 120,000 viewers per match, which he said was "an increase of over 50%" compared to the prior season.
