= JP Dellacamera =

American sportscaster (born 1952)

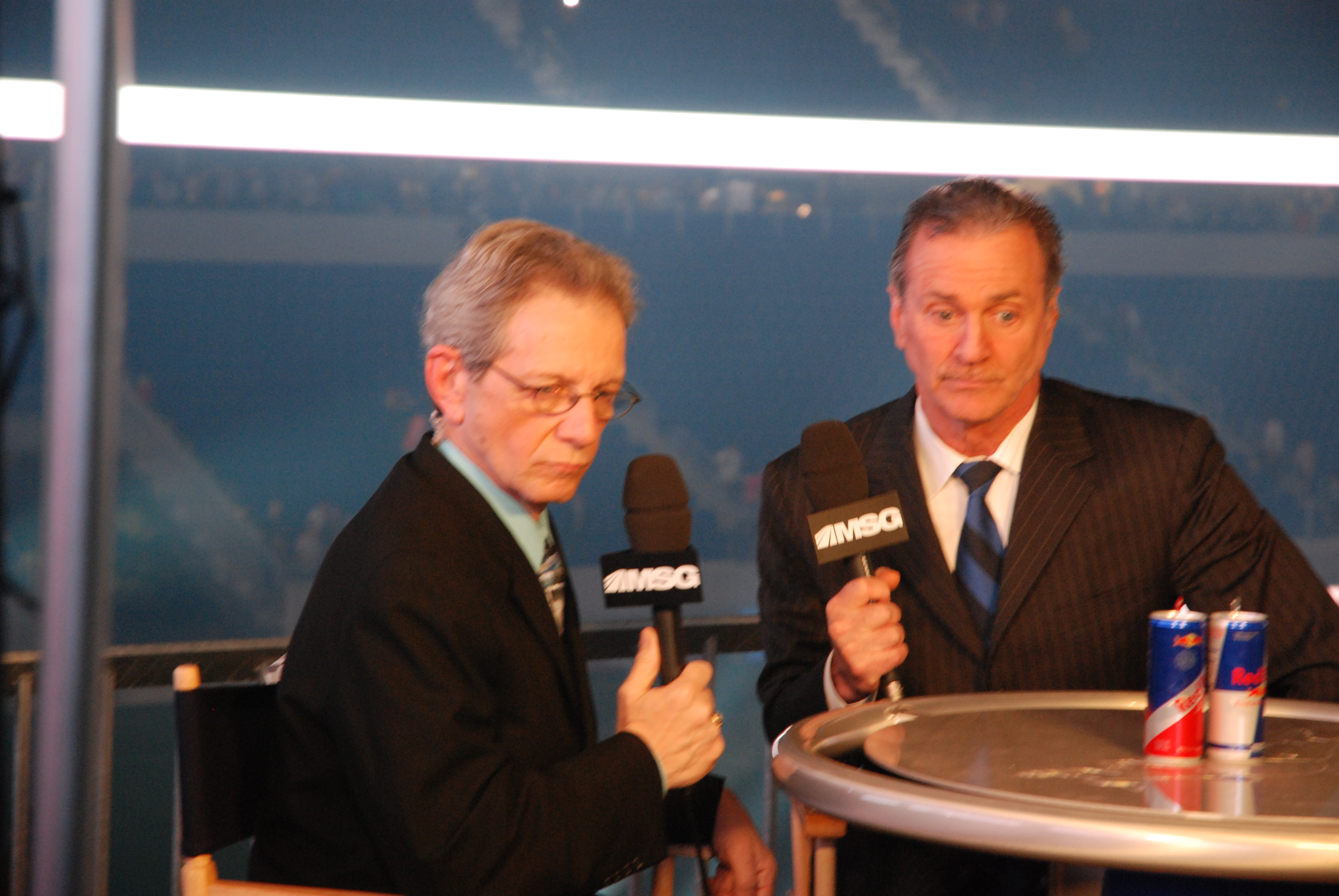
- MSG Network commentators J.P. Dellacamera and Shep Messing at the opening of Red Bull Arena (Harrison), a match between the New York Red Bulls and Santos FC.
- Born: John Paul Dellacamera; January 11, 1952 (age 74); Waltham, Massachusetts, U.S.
- Occupation: Sportscaster

John Paul "JP" Dellacamera (born January 11, 1952) is an American play-by-play sportscaster primarily for Major League Soccer with the Philadelphia Union, as well as major soccer tournaments and ice hockey.

== Early life ==
Dellacamera grew up in Waltham, Massachusetts and graduated from Waltham High School in 1970. He studied broadcasting at Grahm Junior College and spent much of the 1970s as a minor league hockey announcer. In 1982, he got his start as a soccer announcer with the Pittsburgh Spirit of the Major Indoor Soccer League.

== Commentary career ==
=== Minor League Hockey ===
Considered the "Godfather of Erie, Pennsylvania Hockey Broadcasters", Dellacamera was the first hockey radio announcer in the Erie when hired by the Erie Blades ahead of the team's first season in 1975 as the public relations director and broadcaster. Previously, Dellacamera had been in the North American Hockey League (1973–1977) with the Long Island Cougars, and accepted the Blades job after the Cougars ceased operations.

Dellacamera called Blades games on WLKK from 1975 to 1982. Blades' public address announcer and back-up radio broadcaster John Leisering took over broadcast duties for Dellacamera when he left for the Pittsburgh Spirit.

=== Soccer ===
In the 1980s, Dellacamera was the play-by-play announcer for broadcasts of the original Major Indoor Soccer League on ESPN and FNN-Score.

He was ESPN and ABC's play-by-play announcer for their coverage of international soccer, and has been calling the sport for nearly 30 years. Dellacamera did not call the 2006 World Cup, with Dave O'Brien replacing him, but teamed with Tommy Smyth to become the lead radio commentary team for the 2010 and 2014 World Cups for ESPN Radio.

His most famous assignments include eight UEFA Champions League finals and the 1999 FIFA Women's World Cup final between the United States and China. That match ended in a 0–0 tie after regulation, with the U.S. women winning in a penalty kick shootout 5–4 ("The shot-save, Scurry!" was one of Dellacamera's most memorable calls from that day's shootout, coming from U.S. goalkeeper Briana Scurry's save on China's third kick of the shootout). He has also called numerous United States' World Cup qualifiers, including Paul Caligiuri's famed 1989 "Shot Heard Round the World" goal against Trinidad & Tobago.

In 2001, he was the lead play-by-play announcer for the WUSA national broadcasts on TNT and CNN/SI. Dellacamera was NBC's play-by-play voice for soccer at the 2004 Summer Olympics, where he did both the men's and women's tournaments. He also did play-by-play for the New York Red Bulls on MSG Network for several years.

Dellacamera was the first host of ESPN's PressPass alongside analysts Tommy Smyth and Eddie Mighten. The show airs on ESPN's African, Pacific Rim, and Middle East channels, in addition to ESPN360. Dellacamera has been replaced by Derek Rae, and Mighten has been replaced by Janusz Michallik.

Dellacamera served as the lead play-by-play announcer for NBC Sports coverage of Soccer at the 2008 Summer Olympics.

On January 16, 2010, Major League Soccer expansion team Philadelphia Union announced that Dellacamera will do play-by-play for local TV broadcasts during its inaugural season. He called Union matches through the end of their local TV contract after the 2022 season.

In March 2011, Dellacamera left ESPN to join Fox Soccer as their lead MLS play-by-play commentator. However, in November 2011, the NBC Sports Network signed a deal with the league to broadcast all league matches starting in the 2012 season. Fox re-gained rights in time for the 2015 season and Dellacamera reunited with Fox through the 2022 season. He also continued his duties with the Philadelphia Union and even called Union games on Fox broadcasts.

Starting in 2013, Dellacamera will do play-by-play for the New York Cosmos on ONE World Sports when games do not interfere with Union broadcasts.

In 2014, he was a play-by-play commentator for ESPN Radio for the 2014 FIFA World Cup. He was the play-by-play commentator for ONE World Sports's coverage of the 2015 Asian Cup.

In 2018, he was a featured commentator alongside Tony Meola on FOX and FS1 for their United States broadcasts of the FIFA World Cup. He also was the 2018 recipient of the National Soccer Hall of Fame's Colin Jose Media Award. In 2021, Dellacamera took the position of President of Communications/Media of the Major Arena Soccer League.

In 2022, Dellacamera returned to call his ninth World Cup in Qatar and his second with Fox Sports. Then, he returned to call the Copa America in the United States. Calling matches with him both tournaments was former USMNT midfielder and Los Angeles Galaxy player/broadcaster Cobi Jones.

In 2026, Dellacamera called his tenth World Cup, teaming up with Lori Lindsey. Following his final assignment, Dellacamera announced that it would be his last World Cup.

=== National Hockey League ===
In addition to soccer and a few other sports, Dellacamera is a veteran NHL announcer. In the early 1990s, he was a part of the Chicago Wolves for two seasons, being the first play-by-play person on the team. From 2003-04 through 2008-09 he was the television play-by-play voice of the Atlanta Thrashers, and previously served as one of ESPN's many play-by-play commentators. Possibly due to his extensive work in soccer, Dellacamera is one of the few hockey play-by-play broadcasters to use "goal" in his goal calls (i.e. instead of saying "he takes the shot and scores," Dellacamera will say "takes the shot, goal"). Earlier in his career he did play-by-play for both the EHL Long Island Ducks and NAHL Long Island Cougars.

=== World Junior Hockey ===
Dellacamera served as the play-by-play announcer for all US National Team games on the NHL Network during the 2010 World Junior Ice Hockey Championships. Dellacamera replaced Gary Thorne, who was originally scheduled to announce the games.

== TV credits ==
- FIFA World Cup: 1986 (ESPN), 1990 (TNT), 1998 (ABC/ESPN), 2002 (ABC/ESPN), 2006 (ABC/ESPN), 2010 (ESPN Radio), 2014 (ESPN Radio), 2018 (Fox Sports), 2022 (Fox Sports), 2026 (Fox Sports)
- MLS: 1996-2006 (ABC/ESPN), 2008–2010 (ABC/ESPN), 2010–2022 (Philadelphia Union), 2011 (Fox Soccer), 2012-2014 (NBC Sports), 2015–2022 (Fox Sports)
- FIFA Women's World Cup: 1995 (ESPN), 1999 (ABC/ESPN), 2003 (ABC/ESPN), 2007 (ESPN), 2015 (Fox Sports), 2019 (Fox Sports), 2023 (Fox Sports)
- Summer Olympics (Soccer): 2004 (NBC Sports), 2008 (NBC Sports)
- UEFA Champions League: 1994-2000 (ESPN)
- USMNT Games: 1999-2002 (ESPN), 2007-2010 (ESPN)
- USWNT Games: 1999-2010 (ESPN), 2015-present (Fox Sports)
- NHL: 2002-2004 (ABC/ESPN)
- World Junior Ice Hockey Championships: 2010 (NHL Network)
- NWSL: 2021–present (CBS Sports)
- Women's United Soccer Association: 2001 (Turner Sports)
- Copa América Femenina: 2022 (Fox Sports)

Media offices
Preceded by Jack Edwards	MLS Cup play-by-play announcer 2002–2005; 2008–2009	Succeeded by Dave O'Brien; Ian Darke
