= List of MLS Cup broadcasters =

The following is a list of the television networks and announcers that have broadcast the MLS Cup, which is the annual championship game of Major League Soccer (MLS) and the culmination of the MLS Cup Playoffs.

The MLS Cup Final was aired on English-language networks ABC from 1996 to 2008 and ESPN from 2009 to 2014. ESPN/ABC and Fox alternate as MLS Cup Final broadcasters since 2015, with the MLS Cup 2019 on ABC, their first MLS match since 2008. ABC also air four playoff matches including the MLS Cup 2021. The MLS Cup has also been aired on Spanish-language networks TeleFutura in 2007 and 2008, Galavision from 2009 to 2011, TeleFutura/UniMás from 2012 to 2018, and Univision in 2019. ABC previously had Spanish announcers under secondary audio program.

== Television ==
=== 2020s ===
| Year | Network | Play-by-play | Color commentator(s) | Sideline reporter(s) | Studio host | Studio analyst(s) | Rules analyst(s) |
|---|---|---|---|---|---|---|---|
| 2025 | Fox | John Strong | Stuart Holden | Maurice Edu | John Strong | Stuart Holden and Maurice Edu | Joe Machnik |
| 2025 | TSN1 | Luke Wileman | Steven Caldwell | Farhan Lalji | Camila Gonzalez | Kevin Kilbane | Joe Fletcher |
| 2025 | Apple TV | Jake Zivin | Taylor Twellman | Jillian Sakovits | Kevin Egan | Bradley Wright-Phillips, Dax McCarty, Sacha Kljestan, and Kaylyn Kyle | —N/a |
| 2024 | Fox | John Strong | Stuart Holden | Jenny Taft | | Stuart Holden and Alexi Lalas | Joe Machnik |
| 2024 | TSN1 | John Strong | Stuart Holden | Jenny Taft | | Stuart Holden and Alexi Lalas | Joe Machnik |
| 2024 | Apple TV | Jake Zivin | Taylor Twellman | Jillian Sakovits | Kevin Egan and Andrew Wiebe | Bradley Wright-Phillips, Sacha Kljestan, and Kaylyn Kyle | Christina Unkel |
| 2023 | Fox | John Strong | Stuart Holden | Jenny Taft | —N/a | —N/a | Joe Machnik |
| 2023 | TSN4 | John Strong | Stuart Holden | Jenny Taft | —N/a | —N/a | Joe Machnik |
| 2023 | Apple TV | Jake Zivin | Taylor Twellman | Katie Witham | Liam McHugh and Andrew Wiebe | Bradley Wright-Phillips, Sacha Kljestan, and Kaylyn Kyle | Christina Unkel |
| 2022 | Fox | John Strong | Stuart Holden | Kyndra de St. Aubin | Rodolfo Landeros | Alexi Lalas and Maurice Edu | Joe Machnik |
| 2022 | TSN1 | John Strong | Stuart Holden | Kyndra de St. Aubin | Rodolfo Landeros | Alexi Lalas and Maurice Edu | Joe Machnik |
| 2021 | ABC | Jon Champion | Taylor Twellman | Sam Borden | Sebastian Salazar | Alejandro Moreno and Robin Fraser | Mark Clattenburg |
| 2021 | TSN1 | Jon Champion | Taylor Twellman | Sam Borden | Sebastian Salazar | Alejandro Moreno and Robin Fraser | Mark Clattenburg |
| 2020 | Fox | John Strong | Stuart Holden | Katie Witham | Rob Stone | Alexi Lalas and Maurice Edu | Joe Machnik |
| 2020 | TSN1 | John Strong | Stuart Holden | Katie Witham | Rob Stone | Alexi Lalas and Maurice Edu | Joe Machnik |

==== Notes ====
- With the new Apple TV deal beginning 2023, Fox Sports will be the only linear broadcaster of MLS, and will carry select MLS Cup playoff matches, and every MLS Cup with no alternate broadcaster starting 2023.
  - The 2023 MLS Cup final was broadcast worldwide for free in English and Spanish on MLS Season Pass, a subscription streaming service operated by Apple under their Apple TV+ brand. The Apple broadcast included a one-hour pregame show, a post-match show, more than 20 cameras, and a drone for overhead shots. The English commentary team for Apple's broadcast includes play-by-play commentator Jake Zivin, color analyst Taylor Twellman, and sideline reporter Katie Witham; the Spanish team comprises play-by-play commentator Sammy Sadovnik, color analyst Eduardo Biscayart, and sideline reporter Antonella Gonzalez.
  - In the United States, the match was also carried on terrestrial television by Fox Sports in English and Fox Deportes in Spanish. The English broadcast team for Fox comprises commentator John Strong, analyst Stu Holden, and reporter Jenny Taft. The Fox broadcast drew a 0.41 Nielsen rating with an average of 815,000 viewers, while Fox Deportes had 75,000 viewers; the combined viewership of 890,000 was less than half of the 2022 broadcast on Fox and Univision. In Canada, TSN carried the match in English and sister station Réseau des sports (RDS) broadcast it in French.
- The MLS Cup 2022 match was broadcast in the United States on Fox in English, and by Univision and TUDN in Spanish, with pre-game and post-game coverage. The Canadian broadcast was carried on The Sports Network in English and on TVA Sports in French. The Fox English commentary team included their crew for the FIFA World Cup, including play-by-play announcer John Strong, analyst Stuart Holden, and studio host Rodolfo Landeros. For Univision, Luis Omar Tapia and Ramses Sandoval provided play-by-play commentary for alternating halves with analysts Diego Balado and Marcelo Balboa. Fox used 24 conventional cameras, including four for slow motion replays, a skycam, and a helicopter, along with 14 field microphones. The match was also carried by ESPN International in Latin America and Africa, DAZN in Europe and Brazil, Abu Dhabi Sports in the Middle East and North Africa, and Sky Sports in the United Kingdom and Ireland.
  - The U.S. broadcast drew 2.16 million viewers, with 1.49 million on Fox and 668,000 on Univision, and had a national Nielsen rating of 0.69. It was the second-largest domestic television audience for an MLS Cup final after the 1997 edition and increased by 38 percent from the 2021 edition. The match was also the second-most-watched club soccer broadcast of 2022 in the United States behind the UEFA Champions League Final. The MLS Cup final's penalty shootout was watched by approximately 26 percent of all households in the Philadelphia market; the market was also the largest for the Fox broadcast with a rating that averaged 4.78 (347,000 viewers) and peaked at 7.6 (552,000 viewers). The second-highest rating in the Houston market was one-third of Philadelphia's and is thought to have been affected by the World Series, which Fox broadcast immediately after the match. The largest market for the Univision broadcast was Los Angeles with a 1.06 rating, which made it the second-most-watched LAFC match in their home market after the 2019 Conference Semifinal against LA Galaxy.
  - 2022 - Rodolfo Landeros filled in for Rob Stone due to the latter’s college football commitments.
- The 2021 match was broadcast in the United States on ABC in English and UniMás and TUDN in Spanish. The Canadian broadcast was carried on TSN in English and TVA Sports in French. The ABC broadcast featured Jon Champion as the play-by-play announcer and Taylor Twellman as color commentator, along with Sam Borden as sideline reporter and Mark Clattenburg as rules analyst. It was filmed with 28 cameras, including nine fixed cameras, four goalpost cameras, and a skycam above the pitch. The UniMás broadcast featured commentary from Luis Omar Tapia, Diego Balado, Ramses Sandoval, and Daniel Nohra. The match was also broadcast internationally in 200 countries, including on ESPN International in Latin America, the Caribbean, and Oceania.
  - The ABC broadcast was watched by an average of 1.14 million viewers, peaking at 1.63 million during the penalty shootout. It was slightly higher than the Fox broadcast for MLS Cup 2020 and 38 percent higher than the MLS Cup 2019 broadcast on ABC, but lower than the Thanksgiving playoff match featuring Colorado and Portland. The top viewing markets included Portland, where the match garnered a 11.7 rating, Greenville, South Carolina, Seattle, and New York City. The UniMás and TUDN broadcast in Spanish drew 354,000 viewers.
- The 2020 match was broadcast in English by Fox in the United States and TSN in Canada. UniMás and Univision Deportes carried the Spanish broadcast in the United States, while TVA Sports carried the French broadcast in Canada. The match was also broadcast in 190 countries by several international networks, including ESPN Latin America, BeIN Sports, and Abu Dhabi Sports. The MLS Cup final was watched by 1.071 million spectators on Fox, an increase of 30 percent from 2019, and 459,000 on UniMás in the United States.

=== 2010s ===
| Year | Network | Play-by-play | Color commentator(s) | Sideline reporter(s) | Studio host | Studio analyst(s) |
|---|---|---|---|---|---|---|
| 2019 | ABC | Jon Champion | Taylor Twellman | Sebastian Salazar | Adrian Healey | Alejandro Moreno and Kasey Keller |
| 2019 | TSN1 | Luke Wileman | Steven Caldwell | Kristian Jack | James Duthie | Terry Dunfield |
| 2018 | Fox | John Strong | Stuart Holden | Katie Witham | Rob Stone | Alexi Lalas and Maurice Edu |
| 2018 | TSN1 | John Strong | Stuart Holden | Katie Witham | Rob Stone | Alexi Lalas and Maurice Edu |
| 2017 | ESPN | Adrian Healey | Taylor Twellman | Julie Stewart-Binks | Max Bretos | Alejandro Moreno and Kasey Keller |
| 2017 | TSN1 | Luke Wileman | Steven Caldwell | Kristian Jack | James Duthie | Terry Dunfield and Kristian Jack |
| 2016 | Fox | John Strong | Brad Friedel | Julie Stewart-Binks | Rob Stone | Alexi Lalas, Stuart Holden, and Eric Wynalda |
| 2016 | TSN1 | Luke Wileman | Steven Caldwell | Vic Rauter | James Duthie and Andi Petrillo | Kristian Jack, Greg Sutton, and Carl Robinson |
| 2015 | ESPN | Adrian Healey | Taylor Twellman | Mónica González | Max Bretos | Alejandro Moreno and Kasey Keller |
| 2015 | TSN1 | Adrian Healey | Taylor Twellman | Mónica González | Max Bretos | Alejandro Moreno and Kasey Keller |
| 2014 | ESPN | Adrian Healey | Taylor Twellman | Mónica González | Max Bretos | Alexi Lalas and Kasey Keller |
| 2014 | TSN1 | Adrian Healey | Taylor Twellman | Mónica González | Max Bretos | Alexi Lalas and Kasey Keller |
| 2013 | ESPN | Adrian Healey | Taylor Twellman | Mónica González | Max Bretos | Alexi Lalas, Kasey Keller, and Alejandro Moreno |
| 2013 | TSN2 | Adrian Healey | Taylor Twellman | Mónica González | Max Bretos | Alexi Lalas, Kasey Keller, and Alejandro Moreno |
| 2012 | ESPN | Adrian Healey | Taylor Twellman | Mónica González | Max Bretos | Alexi Lalas, Kasey Keller, and Alejandro Moreno |
| 2012 | TSN2 | Adrian Healey | Taylor Twellman | Mónica González | Max Bretos | Alexi Lalas, Kasey Keller, and Alejandro Moreno |
| 2011 | ESPN | Ian Darke | John Harkes | Rob Stone and Mónica González | Max Bretos | Alexi Lalas, Taylor Twellman, and Alejandro Moreno |
| 2011 | TSN2 | Ian Darke | John Harkes | Rob Stone and Mónica González | Max Bretos | Alexi Lalas, Taylor Twellman, and Alejandro Moreno |
| 2010 | ESPN | Ian Darke | John Harkes | Rob Stone | Max Bretos | Alexi Lalas and Steve McManaman |
| 2010 | TSN2 | Ian Darke | John Harkes | Rob Stone | Max Bretos | Alexi Lalas and Steve McManaman |

==== Notes ====
- The 2019 match was broadcast in the United States in English on ABC and in Spanish on Univision; ABC would carry the match on its over-the-air stations for the first time since 2008. In Canada, coverage was provided by TSN4 in English and TVA Sports in French. In Central and South America, the match was broadcast by ESPN International in Spanish and Portuguese.
  - On ABC, ESPN's Jon Champion called the play-by-play with color commentator Taylor Twellman, who also hosted previews on SportsCenter and ESPN+. The Univision broadcast featured Jorge Luis López Salido, Raúl Guzmán, Diego Balado, and Marcelo Balboa. The TSN broadcast, which included a simulcast on TSN Radio 1050 in the Toronto area, was headlined by play-by-play commentator Luke Wileman and color analyst Steven Caldwell. On ESPN International, Spanish commentary was provided by Mauricio Pedroza and Herculez Gomez in Central America, and Hernán De Lorenzi and Pedro Wolff in South America. Portuguese commentary was done by Everaldo Marques and Gustavo Hofman.
  - The ABC broadcast averaged 823,000 viewers and peaked in the second half with 1.1 million viewers, including a 13.2 local rating in the Seattle–Tacoma market. The Univision broadcast averaged 447,000 viewers; the TSN4 broadcast in Canada averaged 748,000 viewers.
- The 2018 MLS Cup final was broadcast in English by Fox in the United States and TSN in Canada. UniMás and Univision Deportes carried the Spanish broadcast in the United States, while TVA Sports carried the French broadcast in Canada. Fox's broadcast was led by play-by-play announcer John Strong, color analyst Stuart Holden, and sideline reporter Katie Witham. The pre-match show was anchored by Rob Stone, Alexi Lalas, and Maurice Edu, with guest appearances from U.S. national team manager Gregg Berhalter and MLS commissioner Don Garber. Fox used a total of 26 cameras for its broadcast, including a new corner flag camera, similar to end zone pylon cameras used in American football broadcasts. UniMás's broadcast was anchored by play-by-play commentators Raúl Guzmán and José Luis López Salido, alongside color analysts Diego Balado and Marcelo Balboa.
  - The Fox broadcast on terrestrial television earned a 1.2 metered market rating, the highest for an MLS Cup final since 1998. The broadcast drew an average of approximately 1.56 million viewers, representing a 91 percent increase from Fox's last broadcast in 2016.
- The 2017 MLS Cup final was broadcast in English by ESPN in the United States and TSN in Canada. UniMás and Univision Deportes carried the Spanish broadcast in the United States, while TVA Sports carried the French broadcast in Canada.
  - For ESPN, Adrian Healey, Taylor Twellman, and Julie Stewart-Binks called the match, with pre-game and post-game coverage conducted by Max Bretos, Kasey Keller, and Alejandro Moreno. For TSN, Luke Wileman and Steven Caldwell called the match, with pre-game and post-game coverage conducted by James Duthie, alongside Terry Dunfield and Kristian Jack. For UniMás and Univision Deportes, Raul Guzmán, Marcelo Balboa, and Diego Balado called the match.
  - The ESPN broadcast registered a 0.7 Nielsen rating, up 75 percent from the MLS Cup 2015 broadcast on ESPN. The ESPN and Spanish language broadcasts in the United States drew an audience of 1.1 million combined viewers, a 43 percent decline from the 2016 final. The TSN broadcast drew an audience of 1.3 million viewers in Canada, a 13.3 percent decline from the 2016 final.
- The 2016 final was broadcast by Fox Sports on terrestrial television in the United States, for the first time since 2008. The match was also carried by UniMás on terrestrial television and ESPN Deportes Radio on terrestrial radio in Spanish within the United States. SiriusXM broadcast the match on satellite radio in the United States. In Canada, the match was broadcast in English by TSN and in French by RDS. The MLS Cup was broadcast internationally by Fox Sports in Latin America and Africa, ESPN Brasil in Brazil, Sky Sports in the United Kingdom, Eurosport in Europe, and BeIN Sports in southeastern Asia and Australia.
  - The 2016 final set a new record for Major League Soccer viewership, with a total of 3.5 million viewers across all channels. Fox's broadcast reached 1.4 million viewers and was the most-watched English language broadcast of the MLS Cup in the United States since 2001. The Spanish-language broadcast on UniMás had an average 601,000 viewers. In Canada, an estimated audience of 1.5 million viewers watched the match on TSN and RDS, setting a new MLS record. The Seattle–Tacoma television market generated a 9.9 household rating for the match.
  - Fox and TSN broadcast pre-game shows on their respective networks, in addition to regular coverage. Fox also broadcast the MLS Cup using a virtual reality app for the first time.
- From 2015 to 2022, all MLS Cup playoff games were televised on ESPN, Fox Sports, or Univisión networks. UniMás aired two exclusive playoff matches, while ESPN and its affiliated networks split the rest of the contests – including MLS Cup – with Fox Sports. Univision, UniMás and TUDN also aired the MLS Cup playoffs in Spanish.
  - In 2015, Fox won the rights to air games and the MLS Cup in even numbered years. John Strong was named the network's main voice for their coverage until 2022, when Fox Sports lost the main rights to Apple TV. However, after talks broke down with both Univision and ESPN, Fox will be the sole linear broadcasting partner for the league from 2023 onward. Under the new deal, Fox will air 34 MLS matches (15 on the Fox network and the rest on FS1), eight playoff games, and each MLS Cup through the 2026 season. These matches will also air in Spanish on Fox Deportes or FS2.
- The 2011 match kicked off at 9:00 pm EST and was broadcast on ESPN for the third consecutive year, as well as Galavisión in the U.S. and on TSN2 in Canada. Additionally, it was aired during prime time for the third consecutive year.
- The 2010 match was televised live in the United States on ESPN, making it the second consecutive year in league history the station carried the match live. The broadcast was available in 1080p high definition. Play-by-play announcer Ian Darke and color commentator John Harkes were in the booth. Darke was commentating his first MLS Cup final, making him the first British-speaker to commentate an MLS Cup match. The pre-game show was hosted by Max Bretos with Alexi Lalas and Steve McManaman. The pregame show was a record-tying one hour before the match itself. The same crew did the post-game show, which was 30 minutes following the match.
  - Prior to the start of the actual match, ESPN suffered severe criticism from fans and the media for their irregular information regarding the championship. At one point, ESPN posted on their website the wrong venue for the championship match, and even failed to mention that the game itself was being carried on one of their channels.
  - With an average U.S. audience of 1.1 million viewers, the broadcast earned a Nielsen rating of 0.4, it was the lowest-rated MLS Cup broadcast in league history. This marked the ninth consecutive year in MLS Cup history that the league championship has failed to draw at least 1% of U.S. households watching television. Many believed the reason was because the two sides playing in the cup final were among the least-supported clubs in the league. The 0.4 television rating was a 44% percent decline from 2009, in which there was a 0.9 rating nationwide.
  - The telecast's individual ratings in the Denver and Dallas–Fort Worth metropolitan areas have yet been disclosed. The numbers, were nearly 50% lower than the numbers Los Angeles and Salt Lake drew last year, where the Los Angeles area drew a 1.9 rating, while Salt Lake drew a 5.8 rating. Other reasons the ratings were very poor was the fact it was played primetime on a Sunday evening, when the American Music Awards was live on ABC; although the AMA's drew weaker network ratings than last year's MLS Cup final. Additionally, NBC's Sunday Night Football NFL matchup between the Philadelphia Eagles and New York Giants was given blame for drawing viewers away from MLS.
  - It is undisclosed what the ratings were for Canadian audiences and the Toronto area.
  - The match was also broadcast in 116 countries by ESPN International networks, including ESPN Atlantic, ESPN Mexico, ESPN Latin America, and ESPN America.

=== 2000s ===
| Year | Network | Play-by-play | Color commentator(s) | Sideline reporter(s) | Studio host | Studio analyst(s) |
|---|---|---|---|---|---|---|
| 2009 | ESPN | JP Dellacamera | John Harkes | Allen Hopkins | Rob Stone | Julie Foudy and Alexi Lalas |
| 2009 | GolTV Canada | JP Dellacamera | John Harkes | Allen Hopkins | Rob Stone | Julie Foudy and Alexi Lalas |
| 2008 | ABC | JP Dellacamera | John Harkes | Allen Hopkins and Pedro Gomez | Rob Stone | Julie Foudy and Alexi Lalas |
| 2008 | CBC | Nigel Reed | Jason DeVos | Mitch Peacock | Brenda Irving | Jim Brennan |
| 2007 | ABC | Dave O'Brien | Eric Wynalda and Julie Foudy | Allen Hopkins | Rob Stone | Julie Foudy |
| 2007 | bold | Dave O'Brien | Eric Wynalda and Julie Foudy | Allen Hopkins | Rob Stone | Julie Foudy |
| 2006 | ABC | Dave O'Brien | Eric Wynalda and Bruce Arena | Brandi Chastain | Rob Stone | Brandi Chastain |
| 2005 | ABC | JP Dellacamera | Eric Wynalda | Brandi Chastain | Rob Stone | Brandi Chastain |
| 2004 | ABC | JP Dellacamera | Eric Wynalda | Lorrie Fair | Rob Stone | —N/a |
| 2003 | ABC | JP Dellacamera | Marcelo Balboa and Eric Wynalda | —N/a | Rob Stone | —N/a |
| 2002 | ABC | JP Dellacamera | Ty Keough | Veronica Paysse | Rob Stone | Eric Wynalda |
| 2001 | ABC | Jack Edwards | Ty Keough | —N/a | Rob Stone | Dave Dir |
| 2000 | ABC | Jack Edwards | Ty Keough | —N/a | Rob Stone | Alexi Lalas |

==== Notes ====
- The MLS Cup had been broadcast on ABC each year from 1996 to 2008, but with ratings declining from 1.4, in 1996 and 1997, to 0.6 in 2008, the MLS Cup was moved to ESPN at the start of 2009.
  - The 2009 MLS Cup final was televised in the United States on ESPN and ESPN360.com in English and Galavisión in Spanish. GolTV Canada broadcast the match in Canada, and ESPN International carried the match in 122 countries, primarily in Latin America, the Middle East, and Oceania. This was the first edition of the MLS Cup to be carried on a cable network, as the previous thirteen were on ABC, and was scheduled later at night to compete with NBC Sunday Night Football. ESPN covered the match using 19 cameras and several digital features, including player tracking statistics and an offside line displayed on instant replays. JP Dellacamera was the lead play-by-play commentator and John Harkes provided color commentary. The network's coverage of the final was later criticized by Salt Lake City-area media outlets for its favoritism of the Galaxy.
- The 2008 MLS Cup final was televised in the United States on ABC in English and TeleFutura in Spanish. English play-by-play commentary was provided by JP Dellacamera with color analysis by John Harkes and studio analysis by Rob Stone, Julie Foudy, and Alexi Lalas. The ABC broadcast was produced by ESPN and featured 20 cameras and the use of a virtual replay system. The match was broadcast in Canada on CBC and CBC Bold, with English commentary by Nigel Reed and Jason DeVos. It was also carried in 142 countries on ESPN International and an additional 23 countries in Europe by local broadcasters.
- The 2007 MLS Cup final was televised in the United States on ABC in English and TeleFutura in Spanish for the first time. English play-by-play commentary was provided by Boston-based sportscaster Dave O'Brien, reprising his role from the 2006 broadcast, and color analysis by Eric Wynalda and Julie Foudy. The match was broadcast nationally for the first time in Canada, where it was carried by CBC Country Canada using the commentary feed from ABC.
  - MLS Cup coverage in Canada started in 2007, with the addition of Toronto FC to MLS. The MLS Cup bounced around different networks in the first three seasons of the league's presence in Canada; what was then the bold network aired the 2007 Cup Final, with CBC airing the next year's Final and GolTV Canada airing the Final the year after that. Since 2010, TSN has aired the MLS Cup Final on its networks; this includes Toronto FC's victory in 2017. In French, RDS has exclusive rights to MLS, and thus the MLS Cup.
- In August 2006, MLS and ESPN announced an eight-year contract spanning 2007–2014, giving the league its first rights-fee agreement worth $8 million annually. This deal gave league a regular primetime slot on Thursdays, televised coverage of the first round of the MLS SuperDraft, and an expanded presence on other ESPN properties such as ESPN360 (now ESPN3) and Mobile ESPN. The agreement also placed each season's opening match, All-Star Game, and MLS Cup on ABC.
  - bold simulcast ABC's coverage of MLS Cup 2007 in Canada.
- The 2006 MLS Cup final was televised in the United States on ABC in English and Spanish using secondary audio programming, earning a Nielsen rating of 0.8 and an estimated audience of 1.24 million. English play-by-play commentary was provided by Boston-based sportscaster Dave O'Brien and color analysis by Eric Wynalda and former U.S. men's national team coach Bruce Arena. Brandi Chastain provided sideline reporting, while Rob Stone anchored the pre-game and halftime shows. The match was also carried in 96 countries by ESPN International and its associated networks.
- The 2005 MLS Cup final was televised in the United States on ABC in English and Spanish using secondary audio programming. English play-by-play commentary was provided by JP Dellacamera with color analysis by Eric Wynalda, reprising their roles at MLS Cup 2004. Brandi Chastain provided sideline reporting, while Rob Stone anchored the pre-game and halftime shows. The Spanish language broadcast was provided by ESPN Deportes and included commentary from Randall Alvarez and Eduardo Biscayart.
- The 2004 MLS Cup final was televised in the United States on ABC in English, along with a Spanish broadcast using secondary audio programming, both produced by ESPN. English play-by-play commentary was provided by JP Dellacamera with color analysis by Eric Wynalda, reprising their roles in the previous final. Play-by-play commentator Ernesto Motta returned to the Spanish-language broadcast, working alongside color analyst Robert Sierra. The ABC/ESPN broadcast was produced by a team of 85 people and used 20 cameras, including specialized replay and slow-motion cameras. The match was also broadcast in over 175 other countries by ESPN International. The ABC broadcast earned a Nielsen rating of 0.8 and averaged a local 2.4 rating in the Kansas City metropolitan area—far below the competing Kansas City Chiefs game.
- The 2003 MLS Cup final was televised in the United States on ABC in English and Spanish using secondary audio programming. English play-by-play commentary was provided by JP Dellacamera with color analysis by Ty Keough, reprising their roles at MLS Cup 2002. Play-by-play commentator Ernesto Motta returned from the previous cup's Spanish-language broadcast, working alongside color analyst Robert Sierra. ABC/ESPN provided a total of 20 cameras, including aerial coverage from a Goodyear Blimp.
- The 2002 MLS Cup final was televised in the United States on ABC in English and Spanish using secondary audio programming. English play-by-play commentary was provided by JP Dellacamera with color analysis by Ty Keough; the pregame and half-time shows were hosted by Terry Gannon and Eric Wynalda, reprising their roles from ABC's coverage of the 2002 FIFA World Cup. The Spanish broadcast was handled by play-by-play commentator Ernesto Motta and color analyst Andres Rodriguez. The ABC broadcast was watched by an estimated audience of 1.2 million views, the lowest for an MLS Cup at the time.
- The 2001 MLS Cup final was televised in the United States on ABC in English and Spanish. The network moved the start time of the match by one hour from 1:30 p.m. Eastern Time to 12:30 p.m. to accommodate scheduling changes caused by the September 11 attacks. The English commentary crew consisted of Jack Edwards for play-by-play, Ty Keough with color analysis, and other programming hosted by Rob Stone and Dave Dir. The Spanish broadcast was transmitted over secondary audio programming on ABC and was headlined by play-by-play commentator Hammer Londoño and color analyst Hernan Pereyra of Radio Unica. The match was also broadcast in 108 other countries by ESPN International. The ABC broadcast earned a 1.0 Nielsen rating, beating the previous two editions of the cup.
- The 2000 MLS Cup final was broadcast in the United States on ABC with English commentary and Spanish via secondary audio programming. The English broadcast was led by play-by-play announcer Jack Edwards and color commentator Ty Keough, who were joined by studio hosts Rob Stone and Alexi Lalas. The Spanish broadcast comprised play-by-play announcer Roberto Abramowitz and MetroStars coach Octavio Zambrano as color commentator. The ABC broadcast drew a 1.0 national rating, matching the 1999 final. The local broadcast in the Kansas City area had an estimated 5 percent share of televisions, falling behind concurrent broadcasts of the film Blank Check and a Kansas City Chiefs game that drew 64 percent.

=== 1990s ===
| Year | Network | Play-by-play | Color commentator(s) | Sideline reporter(s) | Studio host | Studio analyst(s) |
|---|---|---|---|---|---|---|
| 1999 | ABC | Phil Schoen | Ty Keough | —N/a | Rob Stone | John Harkes and Alexi Lalas |
| 1998 | ABC | Phil Schoen | Ty Keough | Seamus Malin and Bill McDermott | Rob Stone | Julie Foudy |
| 1997 | ABC | Bob Ley | Ty Keough | Phil Schoen and Bill McDermott | Rob Stone | —N/a |
| 1996 | ABC | Phil Schoen | Ty Keough | Bill McDermott | Roger Twibell | Alexi Lalas |

==== Notes ====
- The 1999 MLS Cup final was broadcast in the United States by ABC with English commentary, and Spanish commentary was available via secondary audio programming. The ABC broadcast was led by play-by-play announcer Phil Schoen and color commentator Ty Keough, who were joined by studio host Rob Stone. MLS players John Harkes and Alexi Lalas joined the pre-game and half-time broadcasts as co-hosts. ABC deployed 18 cameras for the match and added field microphones to capture crowd noise. The television broadcast on ABC drew a 1.0 national rating, a 17 percent decline from 1998, partially due to competition from National Football League games.
- The 1998 MLS Cup final was broadcast in the United States on ABC with English commentary and Spanish via secondary audio programming. For the third consecutive year, the ABC broadcast was led by play-by-play announcer Phil Schoen and color commentator Ty Keough, who were joined by field reporters Seamus Malin and Bill McDermott. The quartet had worked together on the network's World Cup broadcasts. The television broadcast drew a 1.2 national rating and reached an estimated 1 million households, a 33 percent decrease from previous finals.
- The 1997 match was broadcast on ABC in the United States, where it was watched by an estimated television audience of 2.2 million viewers, setting a record that would stand until the 2016 final. Phil Schoen and Ty Keough reprised their roles from the previous final as play-by-play and color commentator, respectively. The match was also televised in more than 100 foreign markets by ESPN International; it was the first MLS Cup to be broadcast in the United Kingdom, where it aired on Eurosport.
- The inaugural MLS Cup final was broadcast in the United States on ABC in English, with a broadcast team that was used by ESPN for its previous MLS matches during the regular season and playoffs. Phil Schoen was the play-by-play commentator, while Ty Keough and Bill McDermott provided color analysis; Roger Twibell was the studio anchor and was joined by Revolution defender Alexi Lalas, who also performed the national anthem with his electric guitar. The final reached an estimated audience of 1.6 million viewers, exceeding league expectations but falling short of other sports programming from that day. In local markets, the match had an estimated Nielsen rating of 2.4 in the Washington D.C. metropolitan area and 3.3 in Greater Los Angeles.
- On March 15, 1994, Major League Soccer with ESPN and ABC Sports announced the league's first television rights deal without any players, coaches, or teams in place. The three-year agreement committed 10 games on ESPN, 25 on ESPN2, and the MLS Cup on ABC. The deal gave MLS no rights fees but split advertising revenue between the league and networks.

=== Viewership averages ===
1996–2008

| Year | Network | Rating | Viewers (millions) |
|---|---|---|---|
| 1996 | ABC | 1.4 | 3.1 |
| 1997 | ABC | 1.4 | 2.6 |
| 1998 | ABC | 1.0 | 2.2 |
| 1999 | ABC | 0.7 | 1.3 |
| 2000 | ABC | 0.7 | 1.2 |
| 2001 | ABC | 1.0 | 2.0 |
| 2002 | ABC | 0.8 | 1.2 |
| 2003 | ABC | 0.6 | 0.9 |
| 2004 | ABC | 0.8 | 1.3 |
| 2005 | ABC | 0.8 | 1.1 |
| 2006 | ABC | 0.8 | 1.2 |
| 2007 | ABC/TeleFutura | 0.8 | 1.1 |
| 2008 | ABC/TeleFutura | 0.6 | 0.9 |

2009–present

| Year | Network | Rating | Viewers (millions) |
|---|---|---|---|
| 2009 | ESPN/Galavision | 0.7 | 1.1 |
| 2010 | ESPN/Galavision | 0.4 | 0.7 |
| 2011 | ESPN/Galavision | 0.8 | 1.0 |
| 2012 | ESPN/UniMás | 0.7 | 0.8 |
| 2013 | ESPN/UniMás | 0.5 | 1.0 |
| 2014 | ESPN/UniMás | 0.6 | 1.9 |
| 2015 | ESPN/UniMás | 0.4 | 1.2 |
| 2016 | Fox/UniMás | 0.9 | 2.0 |
| 2017 | ESPN/UniMás/Univision Deportes | 0.5 | 1.1 |
| 2018 | Fox/UniMás/Univision Deportes | 0.9 | 1.8 |
| 2019 | ABC/Univision/TUDN | 0.7 | 1.3 |
| 2020 | Fox/UniMás/TUDN | 0.8 | 1.7 |
| 2021 | ABC/UniMás/TUDN | 0.8 | 1.5 |
| 2022 | Fox/Univision/TUDN | TBD | 2.2 |

- The MLS Cup Final has also been aired on Spanish-language networks TeleFutura in 2007 and 2008, Galavision from 2009 to 2011, TeleFutura / UniMás from 2012 to 2018, and Univision in 2019. The 2020 MLS Cup had 1.677 million viewers. Simulcast audiences were listed as FOX with 1.071 million viewers, UniMas with 459,000 and TUDN with 147,000

== Radio ==
=== 2020s ===
In the Columbus area, the 2023 final was broadcast on radio station WBNS with play-by-play commentary from Chris Doran. In the Los Angeles area, the match was carried on radio stations KSPN in English and 980 AM La Mera Mera in Spanish.

SiriusXM FC provided satellite radio coverage of the 2022 final with commentators Joe Tolleson, Tony Meola, and Keith Costigan. For the Los Angeles radio market, the match was carried in English by ESPN 710 and in Spanish by KFWB 980. In Philadelphia, Fox Sports Radio broadcast the match in English; the Union also had a radio stream on their website with local television commentators JP Dellacamera and Danny Higginbotham.

=== 2010s ===
The 2018 match was broadcast on the SiriusXM satellite radio network, with commentary from Joe Tolleson, Tony Meola, and Brian Dunseth. The MLS Cup final was broadcast on television in over 170 countries, mainly on Eurosport and Fox Sports Latin America. The Dutch Eurosport broadcast marked the last match for commentator Frank Kramer, who spent most of the MLS Cup final giving monologues and telling stories instead of commenting on the match.

=== 2000s ===
The 2007 match was broadcast on local radio stations in New England and the Houston area. The 2005 match was also streamed via internet radio on MLSnet.com. Radio coverage of the 2004 match was provided by the local teams in English and Radiovisa nationally in Spanish. It was also carried on the American Forces Radio Network internationally. The 2003 match was broadcast live on radio within the U.S. on Sports Byline USA in English and Radio Unica in Spanish, and on the American Forces Radio Network internationally. The 2000 match was carried via streaming radio on Internetsoccer.com with English commentary from Dave Johnson and Miami Fusion coach Ray Hudson. Local radio stations in the Chicago area also broadcast the match, including WIND-AM in Spanish and WNVR-AM in Polish.

=== 1990s ===
The 1998 match was broadcast by local radio affiliates in multiple languages. In Chicago, WZCH carried the English broadcast, WRZA carried Spanish commentary, and WKTA had the match in Polish. The Spanish broadcast was aired on WACA in Washington, D.C., and the surrounding area.

== See also ==
- List of current Major League Soccer broadcasters
- Soccer on Fox Sports#On-air staff
- Soccer on ESPN/ABC#On-air personalities
