= MLS Cup 2017 =

2017 edition of the MLS Cup

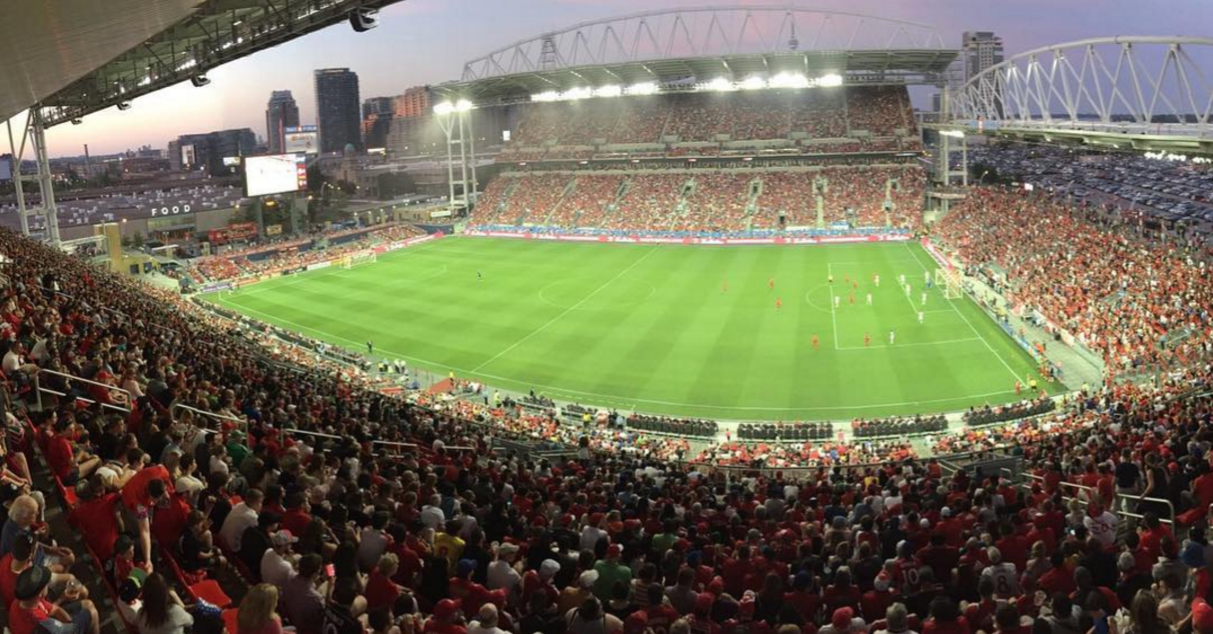
- BMO Field in Toronto hosted the match.
- Event: MLS Cup
Toronto FC	Seattle Sounders FC
2	0
- Date: December 9, 2017
- Venue: BMO Field, Toronto, Canada
- MLS Cup MVP: Jozy Altidore (Toronto FC)
- Referee: Allen Chapman
- Attendance: 30,584
- Weather: Cloudy, 1 °C (34 °F)

MLS Cup 2017 was the 22nd edition of the MLS Cup, the championship of Major League Soccer (MLS), contested between Toronto FC and Seattle Sounders FC on December 9, 2017. The soccer match was hosted at BMO Field in Toronto, Canada, for the second consecutive year and third time overall. Both teams made their second appearance in the MLS Cup, in a rematch of the 2016 edition.

After a goalless first half, Toronto FC took the lead in the 67th minute through a Jozy Altidore goal. Toronto's 2–0 win over Seattle was capped by a 94th minute counterattack that resulted in a goal by Víctor Vázquez. Toronto FC became the first Canadian team to win the MLS Cup and the first MLS team to complete a domestic treble.

Due to Toronto's win, the 2019 CONCACAF Champions League berth reserved for the MLS Cup champions instead went to New York Red Bulls, the US based team (excluding other qualifiers) that finished with the highest aggregate regular season points in 2017 and 2018. Toronto was ineligible to qualify through the berth, which belongs to the United States Soccer Federation, but participated in the 2018 CONCACAF Champions League after winning the Canadian Championship. Toronto also qualified to host and play in the inaugural Campeones Cup against Campeón de Campeones winners Tigres UANL.

== Road to the final ==
The MLS Cup is the post-season championship of Major League Soccer (MLS), a professional club soccer league in the United States and Canada. The 2017 season was the 22nd in MLS history and was contested by 22 teams in two conferences in the east and west. Each club played 34 matches during the regular season from March to October, facing each team in the same conference at least twice and teams in the other conference at least once. The playoffs, running from October to December, were contested between the top six clubs in each conference and included four rounds: a one-match knockout round for the lowest-seeded teams, two rounds of home-and-away series, and the one-match final.

The two finalists, Toronto and Seattle, faced each other in the 2016 cup, which was won by Seattle in a penalty shootout. It was the third in league history to feature a rematch of the previous year, the other two being the 2006 and 2007 wins by Houston Dynamo and the 2011 and 2012 wins by LA Galaxy. The 2017 cup was also the first to see both of the higher-seeded sides advance from the conference finals since it was changed to a home-and-away series, in 2012. The two teams played a single regular season match, hosted by Seattle in May, which Toronto won 1–0.

=== Toronto FC ===
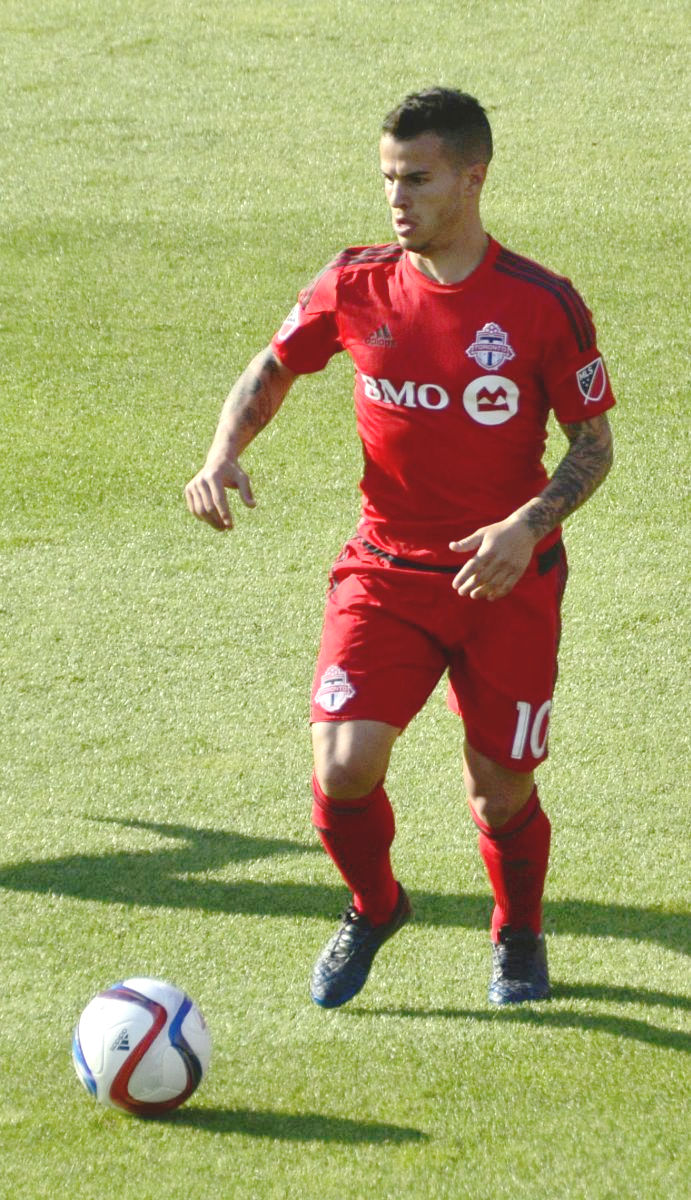
Sebastian Giovinco lead Toronto FC in goals scored during their treble campaign in 2017

After their MLS Cup loss, Toronto FC looked to return to the cup as well as compete for the Supporters' Shield and Canadian Championship. In addition to their 2016 roster, the team acquired French leftback Chris Mavinga and Spanish midfielder Víctor Vázquez to fill depth roles; manager Greg Vanney placed a strong emphasis on an organized defense, one of the team's strengths during the 2016 season. The team entered the season as a favorite to win the cup, as well as a key challenger for the Supporters' Shield. Toronto immediately jumped into a run of good form, with only three losses in the first half of the season, and remained near level with Chicago Fire at the top of the league. Despite two consecutive losses in September, Toronto finished the season as Supporters' Shield champion, breaking the record for most points (69) and tying the record for most wins (20).

Toronto faced the New York Red Bulls in the conference semifinals and took a 2–1 lead away in New Jersey. The team returned home and lost 1–0, but advanced on the away goals rule with the 2–2 aggregate draw. The home fixture was marred by a halftime brawl between the teams that saw Jozy Altidore sent off and Sebastian Giovinco suspended for yellow card accumulation in receiving a yellow card in two consecutive matches. In the conference finals, Toronto traveled to play Columbus Crew SC, earning a 0–0 away draw and a 1–0 win at home, qualifying them for the MLS Cup.

=== Seattle Sounders FC ===
The Sounders entered the season as defending MLS Cup champions, their first title after years of early playoff exits. Head coach Brian Schmetzer, promoted from his interim role, made offseason roster changes to replace older veteran players with younger talent that align with general manager Garth Lagerwey's vision for the club. Among the additions were MLS veteran Will Bruin, homegrown player Henry Wingo, academy graduate Nouhou Tolo, and veteran defenders Gustav Svensson and Kelvin Leerdam, adding to the team's depth positions. Seattle started the season slowly, with only five wins in the first 17 matches, due to injury troubles and inconsistent lineups. From late June to early September, the team welcomed back injured players and went on a 13-match unbeaten streak that put them in playoff contention. The streak ended with a series of draws and losses, but the Sounders recovered with three wins in late September and October to clinch a second-place finish in the Western Conference.

Seattle faced their Canadian rivals, the Vancouver Whitecaps FC, in the conference semifinals. After a scoreless draw in Vancouver, the Sounders returned home and won 2–0 on a pair of goals scored by Clint Dempsey. In the conference finals, the Sounders played Houston Dynamo and earned a 2–0 win in the away leg after a Dynamo player was sent off early in the match. Heading into the home leg with an advantage on away goals, Seattle went for an aggressive 3–0 win to give them a 5–0 aggregate win that was capped by home-and-away goals by former Dynamo forward Will Bruin. The Sounders maintained a shutout streak that carried over from the 2016 Western Conference Final, reaching 647 minutes after the win over Houston.

=== Summary of results ===
Note: In all results below, the score of the finalist is given first (H: home; A: away).

Toronto FC				Round	Seattle Sounders FC			
1st place in Eastern Conference: Pos / Team / Pld / Pts; 1 / Toronto FC / 34 / 69; 2 / New York City FC / 34 / 57; 3 / Chicago Fire / 34 / 55; 4 / Atlanta United FC / 34 / 55; 5 / Columbus Crew / 34 / 54; Source: MLS Qualified for playoffs				Regular season	2nd place in Western Conference: Pos / Team / Pld / Pts; 1 / Portland Timbers / 34 / 53; 2 / Seattle Sounders FC / 34 / 53; 3 / Vancouver Whitecaps FC / 34 / 52; 4 / Houston Dynamo / 34 / 50; 5 / Sporting Kansas City / 34 / 49; Source: MLS Qualified for playoffs			
Opponent	Agg.	1st leg	2nd leg	MLS Cup Playoffs	Opponent	Agg.	1st leg	2nd leg
New York Red Bulls	2–2 (a)	2–1 (A)	0–1 (H)	Conference Semifinals	Vancouver Whitecaps FC	2–0	0–0 (A)	2–0 (H)
Columbus Crew SC	1–0	0–0 (A)	1–0 (H)	Conference Finals	Houston Dynamo	5–0	2–0 (A)	3–0 (H)

== Venue ==
BMO Field was confirmed as the host of MLS Cup 2017 after Toronto FC won the Eastern Conference Championship on November 29, 2017, leaving them as the highest remaining seed. The stadium was renovated and expanded prior to the 2016 season and hosted MLS Cup 2016. Capacity for the 2017 cup was the standard capacity of BMO Field at about 30,000 seats, compared to the extra 6,000 seats available at the 2016 cup which had been reused after a temporary installation for the Grey Cup and NHL Centennial Classic.

On December 1, a round of tickets was released to season seat holders and quickly sold out. Additional tickets were released to the general public on December 4, which were sold out in less than an hour and appeared on secondary markets for well above face value shortly after.

== Broadcasting ==
The MLS Cup final was broadcast in English by ESPN in the United States and TSN in Canada. UniMás and Univision Deportes carried the Spanish broadcast in the United States, while TVA Sports carried the French broadcast in Canada.

For ESPN, Adrian Healey, Taylor Twellman, and Julie Stewart-Binks called the match, with pre-game and post-game coverage conducted by Max Bretos, Kasey Keller, and Alejandro Moreno. For TSN, Luke Wileman and Steven Caldwell called the match, with pre-game and post-game coverage conducted by James Duthie, alongside Terry Dunfield and Kristian Jack. For UniMás and Univision Deportes, Raul Guzmán, Marcelo Balboa, and Diego Balado called the match.

=== Viewership and ratings ===
The ESPN broadcast registered a 0.7 Nielsen rating, up 75 percent from the MLS Cup 2015 broadcast on ESPN. The ESPN and Spanish language broadcasts in the United States drew an audience of 1.1 million combined viewers, a 43 percent decline from the 2016 final. The TSN broadcast drew an audience of 1.3 million viewers in Canada, a 13.3 percent decline from the 2016 final.

== Match ==
=== Summary ===
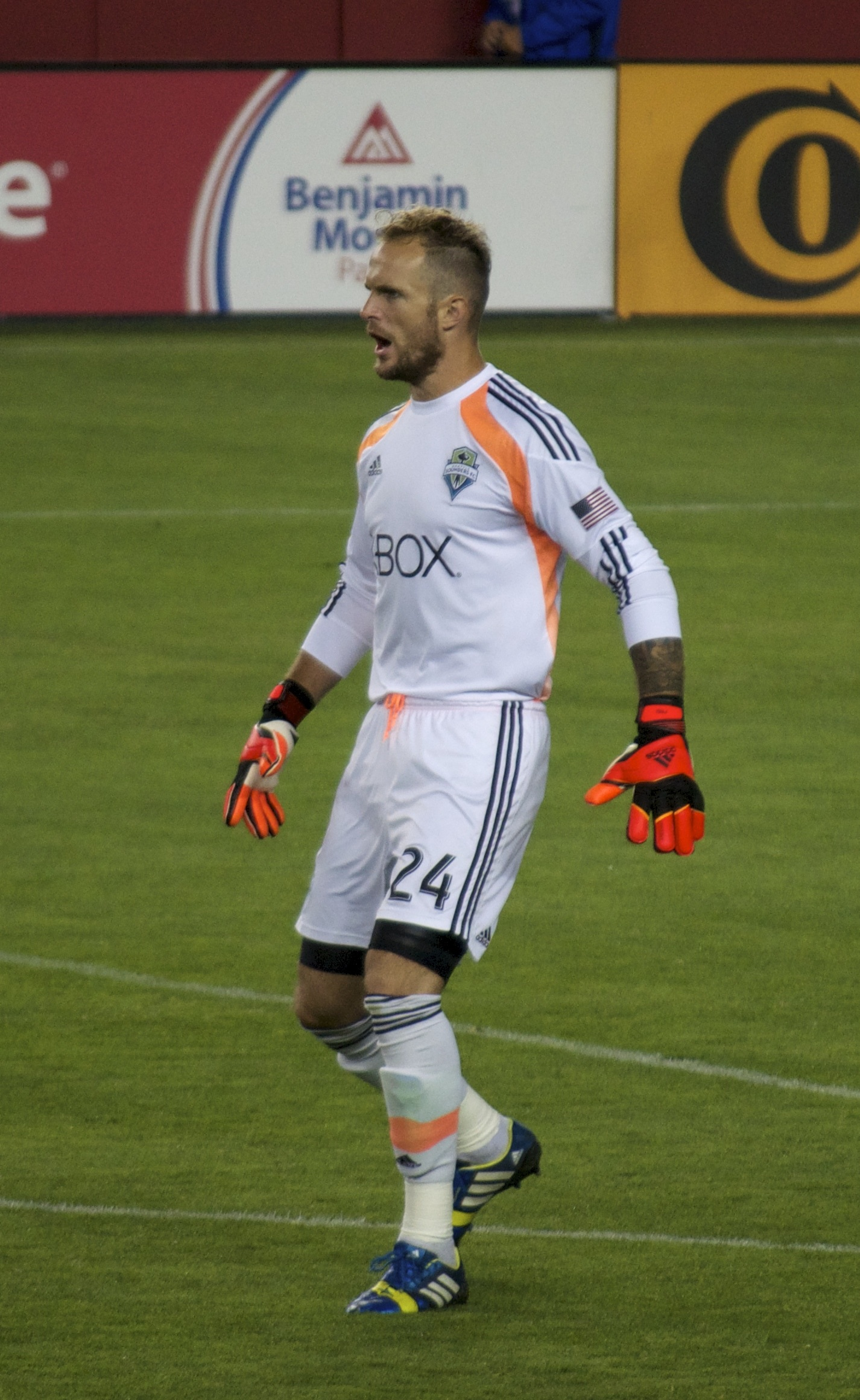
Seattle's Stefan Frei made six saves in the first half, one short of the MLS Cup record set in 2003.

Despite forecasts with cold and snowy conditions, the match kicked off in cloudy weather at a temperature of 1 °C (34 °F), reported to be −7 °C (19 °F) with wind chill. The Sounders were without injured captain Osvaldo Alonso, and also chose to start Joevin Jones at left back in place of Nouhou Tolo. Toronto switched to a 4–4–2 diamond formation, a departure from the 3–5–2 formation used during the regular season and playoff, as Greg Vanney attempted to counter Seattle's strong central players.

Toronto spent most of the first half in possession, making several attacking runs and being the more dominant team. They were unable to score, however, due to a series of saves from Seattle's Stefan Frei, who tied an MLS Cup record for second most saves in a half at six saves, behind Pat Onstad's seven at the 2003 final. He made a diving stop to deny Sebastian Giovinco in the 10th minute and a push on the ball from Giovinco in the 23rd minute. Jones took Seattle's first shot of the match in the 30th minute, ending the club's 150-minute streak without a shot on target between the two MLS Cup finals. In the final moments of the half, Frei saved a shot from Víctor Vázquez and the Sounders nearly scored an own goal after Joevin Jones made a clearance that veered towards the goal. The Sounders were largely unable to challenge the Toronto goal, with the exception of several counterattacks through the middle of the field.

Toronto continued its control of possession and attacking chances early in the second half, with Frei making two key saves on shots from Michael Bradley and Giovinco after the hour mark. In the 67th minute, Toronto strung together a series of passes on a counterattack to Jozy Altidore, who finished with a left-footed shot over Frei to open the scoring. Seattle brought on Jordan Morris for Víctor Rodríguez, and he immediately tried a shot towards Toronto's goal that was wide of the post. During a corner kick for the Sounders in the 83rd minute, a wire holding the Skycam system over the stadium fell onto the pitch, causing a short delay. Toronto made two consecutive substitutions, switching Armando Cooper for Jonathan Osorio at midfield and Altidore for centerback Nick Hagglund. Seattle attempted to score an equalizer, taking shots that forced Toronto goalkeeper Alex Bono to save, but were unable to prevent Toronto from counterattacking. In the 90th minute, Giovinco fell from a shoulder challenge from Cristian Roldan in the penalty area, but calls for a penalty were denied by referee Allen Chapman. Both teams made their final substitutions early in stoppage time, with Toronto bringing on Benoît Cheyrou for Marky Delgado and Seattle switching Jones with Nouhou. A Toronto counterattack in the 94th minute ended with a shot from Cooper that hit the post, but the rebound was finished by Vázquez, clinching a 2–0 victory.

=== Details ===
December 9, 2017
4:00 p.m. EST

Toronto FC	2–0	Seattle Sounders FC
Altidore 67'; Vázquez 90+4'	Report

BMO Field, Toronto, Canada
Attendance: 30,584
Referee: Allen Chapman

Toronto FC	Seattle Sounders FC

GK	25	(United States) Alex Bono
RB	33	(Iran) Steven Beitashour
CB	3	(United States) Drew Moor
CB	23	(Democratic Republic of the Congo) Chris Mavinga
LB	2	(United States) Justin Morrow
DM	4	(United States) Michael Bradley (c)
CM	18	(United States) Marky Delgado		(substituted off) 90+3'
CM	21	(Canada) Jonathan Osorio		(substituted off) 85'
AM	7	(Spain) Víctor Vázquez	(yellow card) 90+5'
CF	10	(Italy) Sebastian Giovinco
CF	17	(United States) Jozy Altidore		(substituted off) 86'
Substitutes:
GK	1	(United States) Clint Irwin
DF	6	(United States) Nick Hagglund		(substituted on) 86'
DF	15	(United States) Eriq Zavaleta
DF	26	(Liechtenstein) Nicolas Hasler
MF	8	(France) Benoît Cheyrou		(substituted on) 90+3'
MF	31	(Panama) Armando Cooper		(substituted on) 85'
FW	87	(Canada) Tosaint Ricketts
Manager:
(United States) Greg Vanney

GK	24	(Switzerland) Stefan Frei
RB	18	(Netherlands) Kelvin Leerdam
CB	29	(Panama) Román Torres
CB	14	(United States) Chad Marshall
LB	33	(Trinidad and Tobago) Joevin Jones	(substituted off) 90+1'
CM	7	(United States) Cristian Roldan
CM	4	(Sweden) Gustav Svensson
RW	10	(Uruguay) Nicolás Lodeiro (c)
AM	2	(United States) Clint Dempsey
LW	8	(Spain) Víctor Rodríguez	(substituted off) 71'
CF	17	(United States) Will Bruin
Substitutes:
GK	1	(United States) Tyler Miller
DF	5	(Cameroon) Nouhou Tolo	(substituted on) 90+1'
DF	15	(Mexico) Tony Alfaro
MF	19	(United States) Harry Shipp
MF	21	(Martinique) Jordy Delem
FW	13	(United States) Jordan Morris	(substituted on) 71'
FW	27	(United States) Lamar Neagle
Manager:
(United States) Brian Schmetzer

MLS Cup Most Valuable Player
Jozy Altidore (Toronto FC)

Assistant referees
Adam Wienckowski (United States)
Jeremy Hanson (United States)
Fourth official
Kevin Stott (United States)
Fifth official
Danny Thornberry
Video assistant referee
David Gantar (Canada)

Match rules

- 90 minutes.
- 30 minutes of extra time if necessary.
- Penalty shootout if scores still level.
- Seven named substitutes.
- Maximum of three substitutions, with a fourth allowed in extra time.

== Post-match ==
Toronto FC became the first Canadian team to win the MLS Cup, and the first MLS team to complete a domestic treble, after winning the Canadian Championship and Supporters' Shield earlier in the season. Toronto received a US$275,000 cash prize as winners, while Seattle was awarded $80,000. Due to Toronto's win, the 2019 CONCACAF Champions League berth reserved for the MLS Cup champions will instead go to the US based team (excluding other qualifiers) that finishes with the highest aggregate regular season points in 2017 and 2018. Toronto was ineligible to qualify through the berth, which belongs to the United States Soccer Federation, but qualified for the 2018 CONCACAF Champions League after winning the 2017 Canadian Championship. Toronto was also qualified to host and play in the inaugural Campeones Cup, a new competition staged between the winners of the MLS Cup and the Mexican Campeón de Campeones. Toronto played against Tigres UANL on September 19, 2018, and lost 3–1.

The day after the final, The Seattle Times mistakenly ran pre-scheduled advertisements on its website that promoted a victory parade and rally for the Sounders, which were later removed. As part of a pre-match wager between the mayors of the two cities, Seattle City Hall was lit in red on December 13. Toronto FC celebrated their victory with a parade two days after the final on December 11, traveling from Maple Leaf Square to Nathan Phillips Square in downtown Toronto. The parade was attended by several thousand fans, as well as Toronto Mayor John Tory, who declared the day as "Reds Day". It was the second victory parade held in the city in as many weeks, as the Toronto Argonauts had won the Canadian Football League's Grey Cup in November.
