= MLS Cup 2014 =

2014 edition of the MLS Cup

- Event: MLS Cup
LA Galaxy	New England Revolution
2	1
- After extra time
- Date: December 7, 2014
- Venue: StubHub Center, Carson, California, US
- MLS Cup MVP: Robbie Keane (LA Galaxy)
- Referee: Mark Geiger
- Attendance: 27,000
- Weather: Cloudy, 73 °F (23 °C)

MLS Cup 2014 was the 19th edition of the MLS Cup, the match that determined the champion of Major League Soccer's 2014 season. The LA Galaxy of the Western Conference hosted the New England Revolution of the Eastern Conference. The soccer match was held at StubHub Center in Carson, California, as the Galaxy were awarded home advantage by finishing the regular season with more points than the Revolution. The Galaxy won 2–1 after extra time, winning their record-breaking fifth MLS Cup title and also sending all-time U.S. national team goal scoring leader Landon Donovan into retirement with his sixth MLS Cup crown.

It was a record sixth time that the MLS Cup was held at the StubHub Center, and the first time in two years that the venue has hosted the MLS Cup. The Galaxy returned to the MLS Cup for the first time since 2012, when they became the third club to win the championship in back-to-back seasons. It was the first time since 2007 that the Revolution reached the MLS Cup final. The two clubs had met twice before in the MLS Cup final: in 2002 and in 2005; the Galaxy defeated New England 1–0 after extra time in both finals. New England Revolution became the first club to lose five MLS Cups.

Going into the match, the Galaxy had earned a berth into the 2015–16 CONCACAF Champions League as the Supporters' Shield runner-up, since the Seattle Sounders won both the U.S. Open Cup and the Supporters' Shield, while New England could only do so by winning the Cup. Had New England won the match, they would have entered as the MLS Cup champion representative. Instead, Real Salt Lake went to the Champions League.

== Road to the final ==
The MLS Cup is the post-season championship of Major League Soccer (MLS), a professional club soccer league in the United States and Canada. The 2014 season was the 19th in MLS history and was contested by 19 teams organized into the Eastern and Western conferences. Each club played 34 matches during the regular season from early March to late October, facing each team in their conference two or three times and those in the other conference once. The playoffs, which ran from October to early December, were contested over four rounds by the top five clubs in each conference. The first round and final were both single-elimination matches; the other two rounds were decided through aggregate score over a two-legged tie with the away goals rule in effect.

Both the Revolution and the Galaxy are original MLS clubs, beginning play in 1996. The teams had faced off in MLS Cup 2002 and MLS Cup 2005, with the Galaxy winning both finals in overtime. The Galaxy had also defeated the Revolution 2–1 in overtime in the final of the 2001 U.S. Open Cup. The two teams had faced each other once before in the 2014 season, with the Galaxy hosting and defeating the Revolution in a 5–1 game that saw both teams reduced to 10 men.

=== LA Galaxy ===
The Galaxy convincingly defeated Real Salt Lake in the Western Conference semifinals by an aggregate score of 5–0. They then advanced past Seattle Sounders FC and to MLS Cup 2–2 on aggregate due to the away goals tiebreaker, as the Galaxy had 1 away goal to Seattle's 0.

=== New England Revolution ===
The Revolution's last MLS cup final was in 2007, where they lost to the Houston Dynamo in their third MLS Cup loss in a row. Since then, the club had hired defender Jay Heaps to manage the club. The team had missed playoffs in the 2012 season, and suffered a 4–3 defeat on aggregate to Sporting Kansas City in the conference semifinals of the 2013 MLS Cup Playoffs. In advance of the 2014 season, the club acquired José Gonçalves on a permanent deal, after a loan deal which saw him win MLS Defender of the Year. Goalkeeper Matt Reis retired from the team after tearing his quad tendons in the 2013 playoffs.

New England knocked out the Columbus Crew 7–3 on aggregate after dominating both legs of the Eastern Conference semifinals before narrowly besting the New York 4–3 over the two legs to reach MLS Cup.

=== Summary of results ===
Note: In all results below, the score of the finalist is given first (H: home; A: away).

New England Revolution
Round
LA Galaxy

Eastern Conference
Team	GP	W	L	T	GF	GA	GD	Pts.
D.C. United	34	17	9	8	52	37	+15	59
New England Revolution	34	17	13	4	51	46	+5	55
Columbus Crew	34	14	10	10	52	42	+10	52
New York Red Bulls	34	13	10	11	55	50	+5	50
Sporting Kansas City	34	14	13	7	48	41	+7	49

Regular season

Western Conference
Team	GP	W	L	T	GF	GA	GD	Pts.
Seattle Sounders FC	34	20	10	4	65	50	+15	64
LA Galaxy	34	17	7	10	69	37	+32	61
Real Salt Lake	34	15	8	11	54	39	+15	56
FC Dallas	34	15	12	7	42	42	0	54
Vancouver Whitecaps FC	34	14	11	9	45	38	+7	50

Opponent
Result
Legs
Playoffs
Opponent
Result
Legs
Columbus Crew
7–3
4–2 away; 3–1 home
Conf. Semifinals
Real Salt Lake
5–0
0–0 away; 5–0 home
New York Red Bulls
4–3
2–1 away; 2–2 home
Conference Finals
Seattle Sounders FC
2–2 (a)
1–0 home; 1–2 away

=== Tournament Bracket ===
Knockout round
E4	New York Red Bulls	2
E5	Sporting Kansas City	1
W4	FC Dallas	2
W5	Vancouver Whitecaps FC	1

Conference semifinals
E1	D.C. United	0	2	2
E4	New York Red Bulls	2	1	3
Eastern Conference
E2	New England Revolution	4	3	7
E3	Columbus Crew	2	1	3
W1	Seattle Sounders FC (a)	1	0	1
W4	FC Dallas	1	0	1
Western Conference
W2	LA Galaxy	0	5	5
W3	Real Salt Lake	0	0	0

Conference finals
E4	New York Red Bulls	1	2	3
E2	New England Revolution	2	2	4
W1	Seattle Sounders FC	0	2	2
W2	LA Galaxy (a)	1	1	2

MLS Cup
E2	New England Revolution	1
W2	LA Galaxy (a.e.t.)	2

== Broadcasting ==
=== Commentary ===
Broadcaster	Language	Commentators		Other staff
Broadcaster	Language	Play-by-play	Color	Other staff
Television
(United States) ESPN, WatchESPN (online)	English	Adrian Healey	Taylor Twellman	Monica Gonzalez, Max Bretos, Alexi Lalas, Kasey Keller
(United States) UniMás	Spanish			
(Canada) TSN	English			
(Canada) RDS	French	Claudine Douville	Jean Gounelle	François-Etienne Corbin, Patrick Leduc, Patrice Bernier
Radio
(United States) SiriusXM	English	Joe Tolleson	John Harkes	Tony Meola
(United States) ESPN Deportes Radio	Spanish	Kenneth Garay	Elmer Polanco	Diego Cora

== Match ==
December 7, 2014
12:26 p.m. PST

LA Galaxy	2–1 (a.e.t.)	New England Revolution
Zardes 52'; Keane 111'	Report	Tierney 79'

StubHub Center, Carson, California
Attendance: 27,000
Referee: Mark Geiger

LA Galaxy	New England Revolution

GK	18	(Panama) Jaime Penedo
RB	20	(Guam) A. J. DeLaGarza
CB	4	(United States) Omar Gonzalez
CB	22	(Brazil) Leonardo
LB	14	(United States) Robbie Rogers	(yellow card) 82'	(substituted off) 91'
RM	24	(Sweden) Stefan Ishizaki		(substituted off) 91'
CM	8	(Brazil) Marcelo Sarvas	(yellow card) 113'
CM	19	(Brazil) Juninho		(substituted off) 96'
LM	10	(United States) Landon Donovan	(yellow card) 45+1'
CF	7	(Republic of Ireland) Robbie Keane (c)	(yellow card) 92'
CF	11	(United States) Gyasi Zardes
Substitutes:
GK	12	(United States) Brian Rowe
DF	2	(United States) Todd Dunivant
DF	21	(United States) Tommy Meyer
DF	33	(United States) Dan Gargan		(substituted on) 91'
MF	6	(Bosnia and Herzegovina) Baggio Husidić		(substituted on) 96'
MF	34	(United States) Kenney Walker
FW	9	(United States) Alan Gordon	(yellow card) 113'	(substituted on) 91'
Manager:
(United States) Bruce Arena

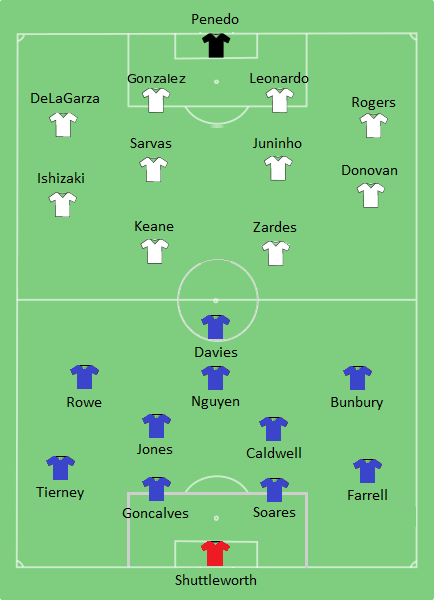

GK	22	(United States) Bobby Shuttleworth
RB	2	(United States) Andrew Farrell	(yellow card) 62'
CB	5	(United States) A. J. Soares
CB	23	(Portugal) José Gonçalves (c)
LB	8	(United States) Chris Tierney
CM	6	(United States) Scott Caldwell		(substituted off) 58'
CM	13	(United States) Jermaine Jones	(yellow card) 113'
RW	10	(United States) Teal Bunbury
AM	24	(United States) Lee Nguyen		(substituted off) 90+1'
LW	11	(United States) Kelyn Rowe
CF	9	(United States) Charlie Davies		(substituted off) 72'
Substitutes:
GK	18	(United States) Brad Knighton
DF	25	(United States) Darrius Barnes
DF	30	(United States) Kevin Alston
MF	12	(Wales) Andy Dorman		(substituted on) 90+1'
MF	16	(Japan) Daigo Kobayashi		(substituted on) 58'
FW	7	(United States) Patrick Mullins		(substituted on) 72'
FW	14	(Uruguay) Diego Fagúndez
Manager:
(United States) Jay Heaps

MLS Cup MVP:
Robbie Keane (LA Galaxy)

Assistant referees:
Peter Manikowski
Joe Fletcher
Fourth official:
Armando Villarreal

Match rules

- 90 minutes.
- 30 minutes of extra time if necessary.
- Penalty shootout if scores still level.
- Seven named substitutes.
- Maximum of three substitutions.

=== Statistics ===
Overall
	LA Galaxy	New England Revolution
Goals scored	2	1
Total shots	16	16
Shots on target	6	6
Saves	6	4
Corner kicks	3	3
Fouls committed	20	14
Offsides	4	1
Yellow cards	5	2
Red cards	0	0

== Post-match ==
The Galaxy set the record for most MLS Cup wins, with five, and qualified for the 2015–16 CONCACAF Champions League as the USA #1 spot. They would win their group, which included Central and Comunicaciones, but lost 3–1 over a two-legged tie against Querétaro. The Galaxy next appeared in the 2024 MLS Cup final, ten years to the day from the 2014 final; they would win 2–1 against the New York Red Bulls.
