= MLS Cup 2016 =

2016 edition of the MLS Cup

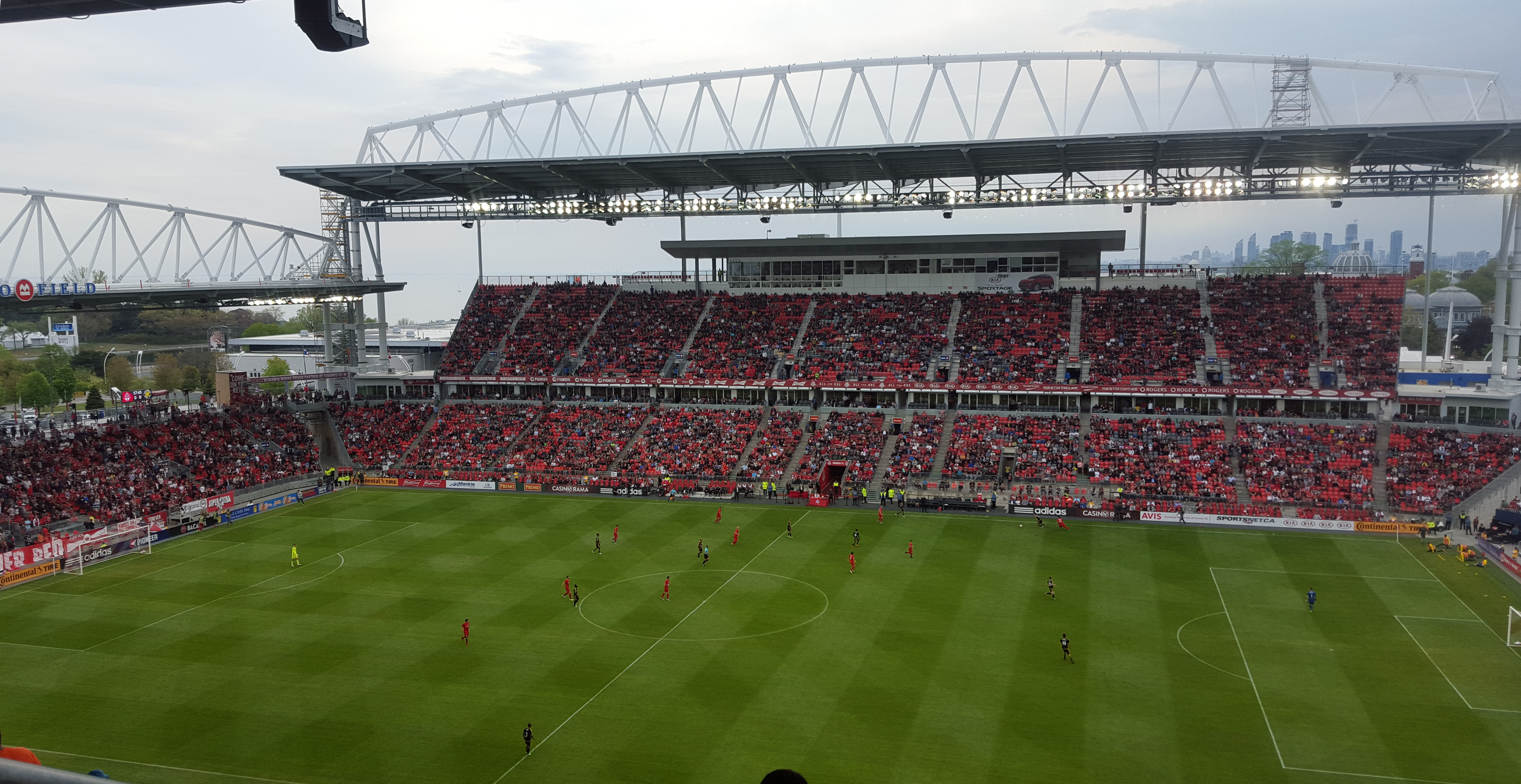
- BMO Field in Toronto hosted the match.
- Event: MLS Cup
Toronto FC	Seattle Sounders FC
0	0
- After extra time Seattle Sounders FC won 5–4 on penalties
- Date: December 10, 2016
- Venue: BMO Field, Toronto, Ontario, Canada
- MLS Cup MVP: Stefan Frei (Seattle Sounders FC)
- Referee: Alan Kelly
- Attendance: 36,045
- Weather: Clear, −2 °C (28 °F)

MLS Cup 2016 was the 21st edition of the MLS Cup, the championship match of Major League Soccer (MLS), played on December 10, 2016. The soccer match was hosted at BMO Field in Toronto, Ontario, Canada, and contested by Toronto FC and Seattle Sounders FC. It was the second final to be hosted in Toronto, after 2010, and the first there since the cup transitioned away from neutral-site venues.

The 2016 final was the first to be contested between two expansion teams and became the first in league history to end in a scoreless draw. The Sounders won their first title in a penalty shootout. Toronto FC became the first Canadian club to play in the MLS Cup, while Seattle capped a comeback season, who replaced their manager during the middle of the season and climbed from second-to-last in the conference to a playoff spot.

== Road to the final ==
The MLS Cup is the post-season championship of Major League Soccer (MLS), a professional club soccer league in the United States and Canada. The 2016 season was the 21st in MLS history, and was contested by 20 teams in two conferences. Each club played 34 matches during the regular season from March to October, facing each team in the same conference at least twice and teams in the other conference at least once. The playoffs, running from October to December, were contested between the top six clubs in each conference and included four rounds: a one-match knockout round for the lowest-seeded teams, two rounds of home-and-away series, and the one-match final.

The 2016 edition of the MLS Cup was the first to feature two expansion teams not part of the original clubs from the league's inception, with Toronto joining in 2007 and Seattle in 2009. For the first time since the 2008 edition, both teams in the final were making their first appearance. Toronto and Seattle faced each other once during the 2016 regular season, ending in a 1–1 draw at BMO Field on July 2.

=== Toronto FC ===
Toronto FC became the first Canadian club to qualify for the MLS Cup final, in their tenth season in Major League Soccer. After eight consecutive seasons without a playoff appearance, Toronto hired manager Greg Vanney, general manager Tim Bezbatchenko, and a trio of star players: American midfielder Michael Bradley, forward Jozy Altidore, and Italian playmaker Sebastian Giovinco. The 2015 season marked the first time Toronto had qualified for the playoffs, as Giovinco set a league record by scoring a combined 38 goals and assists on his way to being named the league's most valuable player.

During the 2015–2016 offseason, Toronto acquired a new set of defensive players, including goalkeeper Clint Irwin, midfielder Will Johnson, and defenders Steven Beitashour and Drew Moor. The team started their first eight matches on the road as BMO Field had not finished renovation work, earning three wins and two draws and staying in a playoff position. Toronto slumped in May with a string of losses and draws, due in part to injuries to Altidore, Bradley, and Giovinco, but regained form in June with the reopening of BMO Field, capped off with a clinch of the Canadian Championship. Toronto lost only two of its final fifteen games, stretching from July to October, and qualified for the playoffs as the third seed in the Eastern Conference.

Toronto hosted the Philadelphia Union in the single-match knockout round, winning 3–1 and advancing to a series against New York City FC. Toronto won the home leg 2–0, and then proceeded to win 5–0 in New York City, setting a record for largest margin of victory on aggregate. In the Eastern Conference final, Toronto would face their rival Montreal Impact in a bid to be the first Canadian team to play in the MLS Cup. During the first leg, played in front of a record crowd of 61,004 in Montreal and delayed 41 minutes due to mistakes in the field markings, the Impact took a 3–0 lead shortly after halftime. Toronto responded with two late goals, giving them a potential away goal advantage. The second leg, played in Toronto, ended 3–2 after 90 minutes and forced extra time, where Toronto would score two unanswered goals to win 5–2. The series, ending with a 7–5 aggregate win for Toronto, set a league record for most goals scored in a two-legged series. Sports journalists called it the most thrilling series in MLS history and an "instant classic", drawing comparisons to the Los Angeles–San Jose series in the 2003 playoffs.

=== Seattle Sounders FC ===
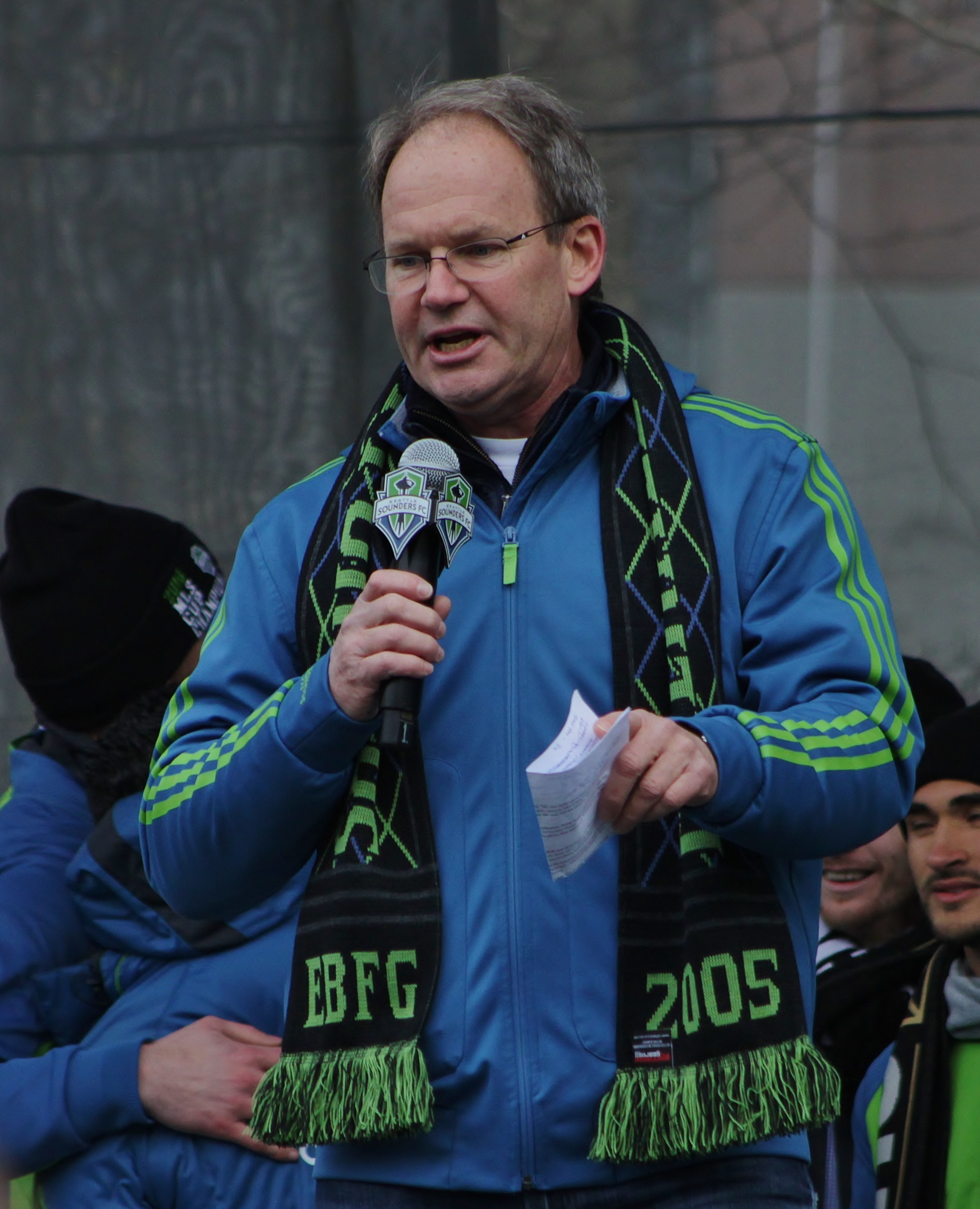
Brian Schmetzer was promoted to head coach during the 2016 season and led the Sounders to the MLS Cup

The Seattle Sounders had been in Major League Soccer for eight seasons, qualifying for the MLS Cup Playoffs each year. While they had won the Lamar Hunt U.S. Open Cup four times and the Supporters' Shield once, the Sounders never advanced further than the Western Conference Finals, which they reached on two previous occasions. The Sounders finished the 2015 season with a loss in the conference semifinals to FC Dallas and plans to retool their roster while chasing the "elusive" MLS Cup.

During the offseason, the club signed young players Jordan Morris, a homegrown player from Stanford, and Joevin Jones from Chicago. The team also lost several key players, including star forward Obafemi Martins two weeks before the start of the regular season. The Sounders won only six of their twenty matches, leaving them second to last place in the Western Conference by late July. Manager Sigi Schmid left the club on July 26, and was replaced on an interim basis by assistant coach Brian Schmetzer. The team signed Uruguayan midfielder Nicolás Lodeiro and saw the return of defender Román Torres from a long-term injury, helping strengthen the team, but lost captain Clint Dempsey to a diagnosed heart condition that would prevent him from playing for the rest of the season. The Sounders went on to win eight of their final fourteen matches under Schmetzer, qualifying on the final matchday for the playoffs as the fourth place seed in the Western Conference.

In the playoffs, the Sounders hosted Sporting Kansas City on October 27 in the single-match knockout round. The team won 1–0, off a headed goal in the 88th minute by Nelson Valdez, ending a personal scoring drought. Seattle advanced to the Conference Semifinals against FC Dallas, winning the home leg 3–0 and losing 2–1 away, for a 4–2 aggregate score. On November 27, the Sounders clinched their first Western Conference championship after a 3–1 aggregate win over the Colorado Rapids, after a 2–1 win at home and a 1–0 win in Colorado that came from a late goal by Morris, who was recovering from the flu.

=== Summary of results ===
Note: In all results below, the score of the finalist is given first (H: home; A: away).

Toronto FC				Round	Seattle Sounders FC			
3rd place in Eastern Conference: Pos / Team / Pld / Pts; 1 / New York Red Bulls / 34 / 57; 2 / New York City FC / 34 / 54; 3 / Toronto FC / 34 / 53; 4 / D.C. United / 34 / 46; 5 / Montreal Impact / 34 / 45; Source: MLS Qualified for playoffs Supporters' Shield winner				Regular season	4th place in Western Conference: Pos / Team / Pld / Pts; 2 / Colorado Rapids / 34 / 58; 3 / LA Galaxy / 34 / 52; 4 / Seattle Sounders FC / 34 / 48; 5 / Sporting Kansas City / 34 / 47; 6 / Real Salt Lake / 34 / 46; Source: MLS Qualified for playoffs			
Opponent	Agg.	1st leg	2nd leg	MLS Cup Playoffs	Opponent	Agg.	1st leg	2nd leg
Philadelphia Union	3–1 (H)			Knockout Round	Sporting Kansas City	1–0 (H)		
New York City FC	7–0	2–0 (H)	5–0 (A)	Conference Semifinals	FC Dallas	4–2	3–0 (H)	1–2 (A)
Montreal Impact	7–5	2–3 (A)	5–2 (a.e.t.) (H)	Conference Finals	Colorado Rapids	3–1	2–1 (H)	1–0 (A)

== Venue ==
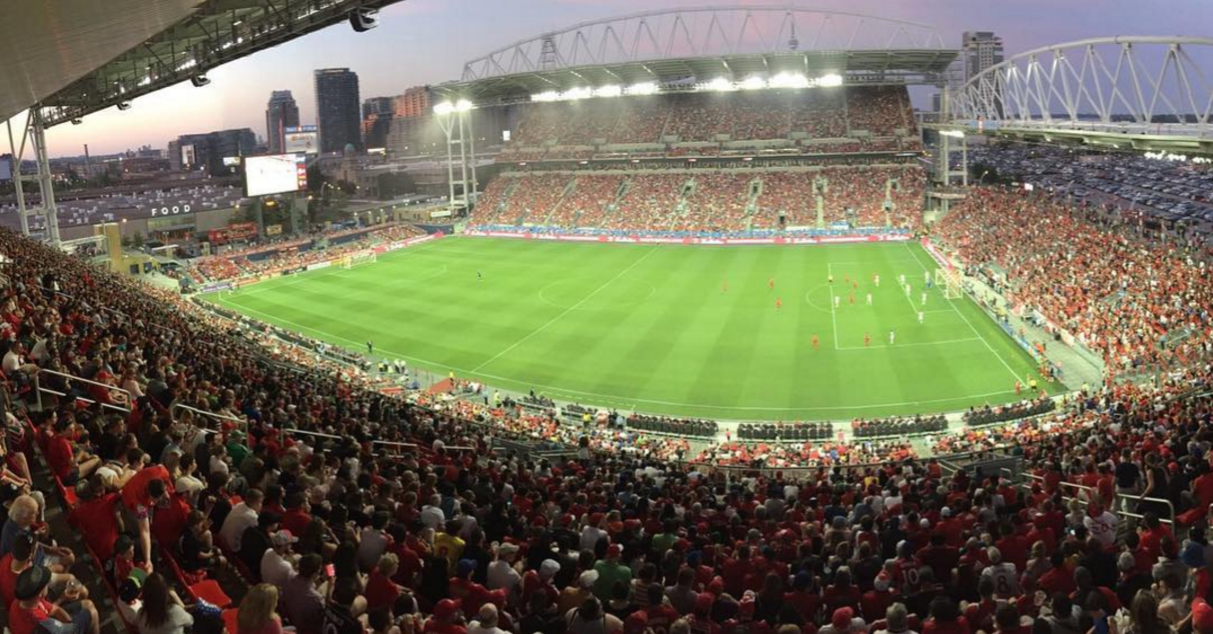
The renovated and expanded BMO Field in Toronto hosted MLS Cup 2016

BMO Field was confirmed as the host of MLS Cup 2016 after Toronto FC won the Eastern Conference Championship, leaving them as the highest remaining seed. The stadium previously hosted MLS Cup 2010 as a neutral site, and had also hosted the 2008 MLS All-Star Game and the 2007 FIFA Under-20 World Cup. It was renovated prior to the 2016 season, adding additional seats and a roof to cover the stands at a cost of C$150 million. Maple Leaf Sports & Entertainment, the owners of BMO Field and Toronto FC, spent C$7 million on pitch maintenance for the 2016 season, in part due to the shared field with the Toronto Argonauts of the Canadian Football League (CFL).

During the season, a temporary upper grandstand was built in the south end, originally to accommodate larger crowds for the CFL's 104th Grey Cup (which took place prior to the MLS Cup) and the National Hockey League's Centennial Classic (which was played after the MLS championship game). The club subsequently confirmed that the temporary seats would be made available to soccer fans if Toronto qualified for any playoff games that took place after the CFL championship game (specifically, the Eastern Conference Final and the MLS Cup). With the temporary seats, the stadium's capacity in its soccer configuration was about 36,000. The Toronto Transit Commission and GO Transit announced increased service on bus and train routes to BMO Field on the night of the final.

=== Ticketing ===
Tickets for the match were divided into several blocs for allocation. A pre-sale event a week before the cup final sold 20,000 seats to existing season ticket holders, based on seniority; the sale did not guarantee similar seats to their season tickets, causing fans to complain on social media. A public sale on December 5 sold out 9,000 tickets, which quickly appeared on secondary markets for well above face value. An additional 5,000 seats were allocated to MLS, including 1,500 tickets for traveling supporters from Seattle.

== Broadcasting ==
The 2016 final was broadcast by Fox Sports on terrestrial television in the United States, for the first time since 2008. The match was also carried by UniMás on terrestrial television and ESPN Deportes Radio on terrestrial radio in Spanish within the United States. SiriusXM broadcast the match on satellite radio in the United States. In Canada, the match was broadcast in English by TSN and in French by RDS. The MLS Cup was broadcast internationally by Fox Sports in Latin America and Africa, ESPN Brasil in Brazil, Sky Sports in the United Kingdom, Eurosport in Europe, and BeIN Sports in southeastern Asia and Australia.

Fox and TSN broadcast pre-game shows on their respective networks, in addition to regular coverage. Fox also broadcast the MLS Cup using a virtual reality app for the first time.

=== Commentary ===
Broadcaster	Language	Commentators		Other staff
Broadcaster	Language	Play-by-play	Color	Other staff
Television
(United States) Fox	English	John Strong	Brad Friedel	Alexi Lalas, Julie Stewart-Binks
(United States) UniMás	Spanish	Raúl Guzmán	Diego Balado, Marcelo Balboa	Gonzalo Pineda, Ramsés Sandoval
(Canada) TSN	English	Luke Wileman	Steven Caldwell	Kristian Jack, Vic Rauter, Andi Petrillo, James Duthie
(Canada) RDS	French	Claudine Douville	Jean Gounelle	Patrick Friolet
Radio
(United States) SiriusXM	English	Joe Tolleson	Janusz Michallik, Glenn Crooks	
(Canada) TSN Radio	English	Gareth Wheeler	Terry Dunfield	

=== Viewership ===
The 2016 final set a new record for Major League Soccer viewership, with a total of 3.5 million viewers across all channels. Fox's broadcast reached 1.4 million viewers and was the most-watched English language broadcast of the MLS Cup in the United States since 2001. The Spanish-language broadcast on UniMás had an average 601,000 viewers. In Canada, an estimated audience of 1.5 million viewers watched the match on TSN and RDS, setting a new MLS record. The Seattle–Tacoma television market generated a 9.9 household rating for the match.

== Match ==
=== Summary ===
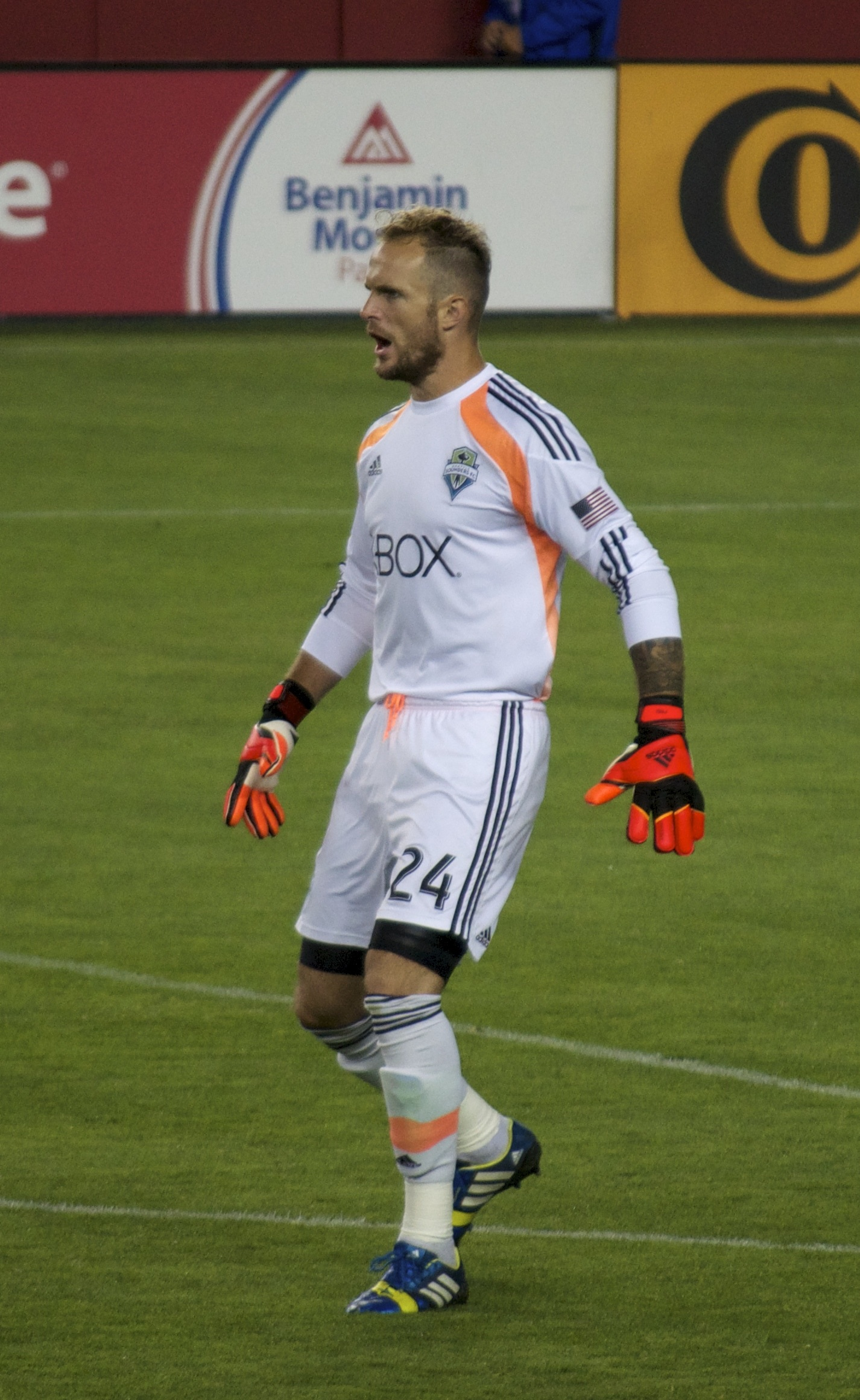
Sounders goalkeeper Stefan Frei, whose save in extra time helped earned him the match MVP honors

The match kicked off at 8:16 p.m. Eastern Time at BMO Field in Toronto, Ontario, Canada, where the ground temperature was reported as −5 °C (23 °F) and estimated at −12 °C (10 °F) with wind chill. Alan Kelly was the head referee and his assistants were Frank Anderson, Joe Fletcher, Allen Chapman, and Danny Thornberry. Kelly and Anderson had been named the 2016 MLS Referee of the Year and the 2016 MLS Assistant Referee of the year, respectively, for their regular season performances.

During the first half, Toronto had the majority of possession and seven chances at goal, but were unable to score. Several hard tackles between players resulted in fouls being called and arguments, but no bookings from referee Alan Kelly.

The second half began with a major chance for Toronto's Sebastian Giovinco, who hit the side netting on an attempt at goal. Two Seattle players, Nelson Valdez and Erik Friberg, were substituted after suffering minor injuries. The rest of the half saw missed passes and touches from Toronto, along with a steadfast Seattle defense that let the match head into extra time at 0–0.

The first half of extra time remained scoreless, with Giovinco replaced by Tosaint Ricketts after suffering from a cramp. By the second half, both teams had exhausted their available substitutes. In the 108th minute, Seattle goalkeeper Stefan Frei made a crucial save on a header from Jozy Altidore, using his body to spring his left hand onto the ball; Frei would record seven total saves and be named the game's most valuable player for his efforts. The second half of extra time drew to a close after more than 120 minutes of play, with Seattle failing to register a single shot on goal.

The penalty shootout began with Toronto's Jozy Altidore, who scored his attempt. After the first two rounds, including a miss from Toronto's Michael Bradley, Seattle had a 2–1 lead. Seattle's Álvaro Fernández missed his shot in the third round, leading to a tie that would persist until the end of the first five rounds. During the sudden death rounds, Toronto's Justin Morrow missed his penalty, letting it hit the crossbar of the goal. Seattle defender Román Torres scored in the following attempt, winning the shootout and cup for Seattle 5–4, their first ever MLS Cup title.

=== Details ===
December 10, 2016
8:00 p.m. EST

Toronto FC	0–0 (a.e.t.)	Seattle Sounders FC
	Report
Penalties
Altidore (penalty scored); Bradley (penalty missed); Cheyrou (penalty scored); Johnson (penalty scored); Moor (penalty scored); Morrow (penalty missed)	4–5	(penalty scored) Evans; (penalty scored) Ivanschitz; (penalty missed) Fernández; (penalty scored) J. Jones; (penalty scored) Lodeiro; (penalty scored) Torres

BMO Field, Toronto, Ontario
Attendance: 36,045
Referee: Alan Kelly

Toronto FC	Seattle Sounders FC

GK	1	(United States) Clint Irwin
CB	15	(United States) Eriq Zavaleta
CB	3	(United States) Drew Moor
CB	6	(United States) Nick Hagglund
RM	33	(Iran) Steven Beitashour
CM	31	(Panama) Armando Cooper		(substituted off) 85'
CM	4	(United States) Michael Bradley (c)	(yellow card) 90+3'
CM	21	(Canada) Jonathan Osorio		(substituted off) 77'
LM	2	(United States) Justin Morrow
CF	17	(United States) Jozy Altidore
CF	10	(Italy) Sebastian Giovinco		(substituted off) 103'
Substitutes:
GK	25	(United States) Alex Bono
DF	23	(United States) Josh Williams
DF	28	(United States) Mark Bloom
MF	7	(Canada) Will Johnson		(substituted on) 77'
MF	8	(France) Benoît Cheyrou		(substituted on) 85'
FW	9	(Japan) Tsubasa Endoh
FW	87	(Canada) Tosaint Ricketts		(substituted on) 103'
Manager:
(United States) Greg Vanney

GK	24	(Switzerland) Stefan Frei
RB	4	(England) Tyrone Mears
CB	29	(Panama) Román Torres
CB	14	(United States) Chad Marshall	(yellow card) 45+1'
LB	33	(Trinidad and Tobago) Joevin Jones	(yellow card) 72'
CM	6	(Cuba) Osvaldo Alonso (c)
CM	7	(United States) Cristian Roldan
RW	10	(Uruguay) Nicolás Lodeiro
AM	8	(Sweden) Erik Friberg		(substituted off) 66'
LW	13	(United States) Jordan Morris		(substituted off) 108'
CF	16	(Paraguay) Nelson Valdez		(substituted off) 73'
Substitutes:
GK	1	(United States) Tyler Miller
DF	3	(United States) Brad Evans		(substituted on) 108'
DF	20	(United States) Zach Scott
DF	91	(Jamaica) Oniel Fisher
MF	21	(Uruguay) Álvaro Fernández		(substituted on) 66'
MF	23	(Austria) Andreas Ivanschitz		(substituted on) 73'
FW	9	(United States) Herculez Gomez
Manager:
(United States) Brian Schmetzer

MLS Cup MVP:
Stefan Frei (Seattle Sounders FC)

Assistant referees:
Frank Anderson
Joe Fletcher
Fourth official:
Allen Chapman
Fifth official:
Danny Thornberry

Match rules:

- 90 minutes.
- 30 minutes of extra time if necessary.
- Penalty shootout if scores still level.
- Seven named substitutes, of which up to three may be used.

== Post-match ==
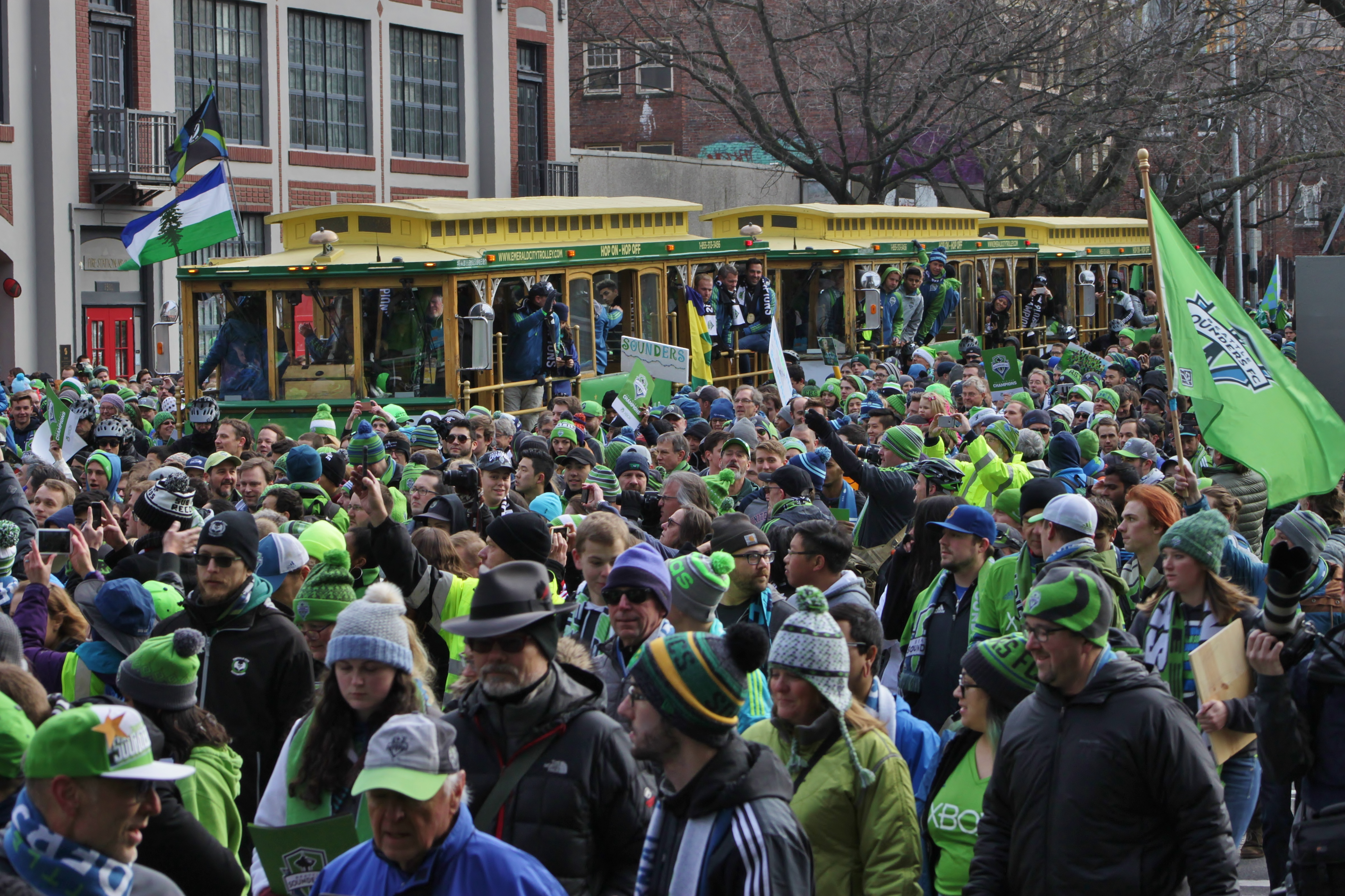
The MLS Cup victory parade in Downtown Seattle, on December 13, 2016

Seattle Sounders FC became the first MLS club to not register a shot on goal during regular play, surpassing the record of one shot on goal the club set earlier in the season against Sporting Kansas City. Stefan Frei, who was traded from Toronto to Seattle three years to the day of the final, was awarded the MLS Cup Most Valuable Player award for his shutout and penalty saves. The team's comeback performance under new head coach Brian Schmetzer, from second-to-last in the conference to MLS Cup champions, was called the most stunning turnaround in MLS history and a "cinderella season". The season was voted the Sports Story of the Year in a public contest held by Sportspress Northwest.

The Sounders earned a berth into the 2018 CONCACAF Champions League, their first since the 2015–16 edition. Toronto earned a berth into the same competition by winning the 2017 Canadian Championship; the team was ineligible from qualifying for the competition through an MLS Cup win due to confederation rules. As MLS Cup winners, the Sounders received a prize of $275,000, while Toronto were awarded $80,000 as runners-up. Both teams would later qualify for MLS Cup 2017, setting up a rematch at BMO Field that was won by Toronto.

The Sounders celebrated their first MLS Cup with a parade in Seattle on December 13 from Westlake Park to a rally at the Seattle Center, adjacent to the Sounders' first home stadium at Memorial Stadium; the parade and rally were attended by an estimated 10,000 fans. The 2016 title was the fifth league championship won by the club, who previously won four lower-division championships in the A-League and USL First Division.
