= Paul Dolan (soccer) =

Canadian soccer player

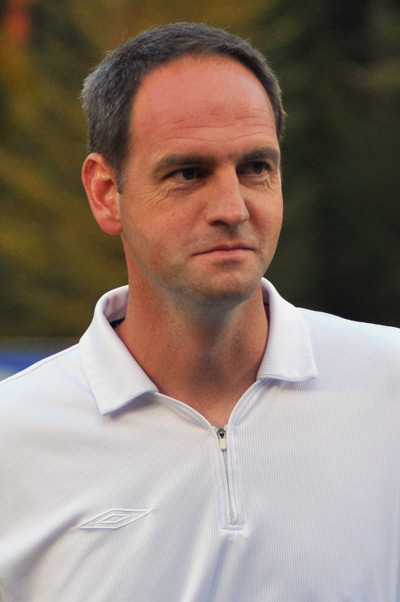
- Dolan in 2009

Personal information
- Full name: Kenneth Paul Dolan
- Date of birth: April 16, 1966 (age 60)
- Place of birth: Ottawa, Ontario, Canada
- Height: 6 ft 4 in (1.93 m)
- Position: Goalkeeper

Senior career*
Years	Team	Apps	(Gls)
1986	Edmonton Brick Men	9	(0)
1987–1988	Tacoma Stars (indoor)	11	(0)
1988	Vancouver 86ers	7	(0)
1988–1989	Hamilton Steelers	43	(0)
1990–1998	Vancouver 86ers	157	(0)

International career
1984–1997	Canada	53	(0)
Medal record
Representing Canada
Men's Association football
CONCACAF Championship
Winner	1985 North America
North American Nations Cup
Winner	1990 Canada
Third place	1991 United States
- * Club domestic league appearances and goals

Kenneth Paul Dolan (born April 16, 1966) is a former Canadian national team and Canadian Soccer League goalkeeper. He is currently the colour commentator for the Vancouver Whitecaps FC on MLS on TSN. He was inducted into the Canadian Soccer Hall of Fame in 2004.

== Club career ==
Dolan had a trial with Notts County of England's Football League following the 1986 World Cup, but returned to Canada to continue his career in the Canadian Soccer League, playing for the Vancouver 86ers and Hamilton Steelers and winning the CSL championship with the 86ers in 1990 and 1991.

== International career ==
Dolan was a member of Canada's Youth team in Trinidad and Tobago in 1984 that qualified for the FIFA World Youth Championship in the Soviet Union in 1985.

He made his senior debut in an October 1984 friendly match against Cyprus and burst on to the international scene in 1986, when he played for Canada in the opening game of the World Cup in Mexico against France. He held the famous French team scoreless until the 79th minute when Jean Pierre Papin gave France a narrow 1–0 victory.

He earned a total of 53 caps and has represented Canada in 15 FIFA World Cup qualification matches in four World Cup qualifying campaigns. He also played at the inaugural 1989 FIFA Futsal World Championship.

His final international was a November 1997 World Cup qualification match against Costa Rica, a game after which Alex Bunbury, Geoff Aunger, Frank Yallop and Colin Miller also said farewell to the national team.

In 2004, Dolan was inducted into the Canadian Soccer Hall of Fame.

== Coaching career ==
After retiring, Dolan became one of Canada's goalkeeper coaches at both CONCACAF Gold Cup tournaments and World Cup qualification games.

== Broadcasting career ==
Also after retiring Dolan developed a career as a broadcaster first broadcasting USL games on Fox Soccer Channel and from 2011 on broadcasting Major League Soccer (MLS) games on TSN and Sportsnet as well as acting as a match analyst for MLS Season Pass.

== Honours ==
- Canadian Soccer League: 1990, 1991

Canada

- CONCACAF Championship: 1985
- North American Nations Cup: 1990; 3rd place, 1991
