= 2017 MLS Cup playoffs =

2017 edition of the MLS playoffs

Tournament details
- Country: United States; Canada
- Dates: October 25 – December 9
- Teams: 12

Final positions
- Champions: Toronto FC (1st title)
- Runners-up: Seattle Sounders FC
- Semifinalists: Columbus Crew SC; Houston Dynamo

Tournament statistics
- Matches played: 17
- Goals scored: 34 (2 per match)
- Attendance: 453,781 (26,693 per match)
- Top goal scorer(s): (United States) Clint Dempsey (3 goals)

The 2017 MLS Cup playoffs (branded as the 2017 Audi MLS Cup Playoffs for sponsorship reasons) began on October 25 and ended on December 9 with MLS Cup 2017, the 22nd league championship match for MLS. This was the 22nd version of the MLS Cup playoffs, the tournament culminating the Major League Soccer regular season. Twelve teams, the top six of each conference, competed in the playoffs.

The first round of each conference had the third-seeded team hosting the sixth seed while the fourth-seed hosted the fifth seed, in a single match to determine who advanced to the conference semifinals. In the conference semifinals, the top seed played the lowest remaining seed, while the second played the next-lowest. The winners advanced to the conference finals. Both the conference semifinals and conference finals were played as a two-legged aggregate series, with the higher-ranked team hosting the second leg. The winners advanced to the MLS Cup, a single match hosted by the participant with the better regular season record.

== Qualified teams ==
The top six teams from each conference advanced to the MLS Cup playoffs. Chicago and Portland won the seeding tiebreakers over Atlanta and Seattle, respectively, based on total wins.

Eastern Conference

| Pos | Team | Pld | Pts |
|---|---|---|---|
| 1 | Toronto FC | 34 | 69 |
| 2 | New York City FC | 34 | 57 |
| 3 | Chicago Fire | 34 | 55 |
| 4 | Atlanta United FC | 34 | 55 |
| 5 | Columbus Crew | 34 | 54 |
| 6 | New York Red Bulls | 34 | 50 |
| 7 | New England Revolution | 34 | 45 |
| 8 | Philadelphia Union | 34 | 42 |
| 9 | Montreal Impact | 34 | 39 |
| 10 | Orlando City SC | 34 | 39 |
| 11 | D.C. United | 34 | 32 |

Source: MLS

Western Conference

| Pos | Team | Pld | Pts |
|---|---|---|---|
| 1 | Portland Timbers | 34 | 53 |
| 2 | Seattle Sounders FC | 34 | 53 |
| 3 | Vancouver Whitecaps FC | 34 | 52 |
| 4 | Houston Dynamo | 34 | 50 |
| 5 | Sporting Kansas City | 34 | 49 |
| 6 | San Jose Earthquakes | 34 | 46 |
| 7 | FC Dallas | 34 | 46 |
| 8 | Real Salt Lake | 34 | 45 |
| 9 | Minnesota United FC | 34 | 36 |
| 10 | Colorado Rapids | 34 | 33 |
| 11 | LA Galaxy | 34 | 32 |

Source: MLS

== Bracket ==
Knockout round | Conference semifinals
E5 | Columbus Crew SC | 4 | 0 | 4
October 26 – Atlanta, Georgia
E2 | New York City FC | 1 | 2 | 3
E4 | Atlanta United FC | 0 (1)
E5 | Columbus Crew SC (p) | 0 (3)
Eastern Conference
E6 | New York Red Bulls | 1 | 1 | 2
October 25 – Bridgeview, Illinois
E1 | Toronto FC | 2 | 0 | 2 (a)
E3 | Chicago Fire | 0
E6 | New York Red Bulls | 4
W4 | Houston Dynamo | 0 | 2 | 2
October 26 – Houston, Texas
W1 | Portland Timbers | 0 | 1 | 1
W4 | Houston Dynamo (a.e.t.) | 1
W5 | Sporting Kansas City | 0
Western Conference
W3 | Vancouver Whitecaps FC | 0 | 0 | 0
October 25 – Vancouver, British Columbia
W2 | Seattle Sounders FC | 0 | 2 | 2
W3 | Vancouver Whitecaps FC | 5
W6 | San Jose Earthquakes | 0

Conference finals
E5 | Columbus Crew SC | 0 | 0 | 0
E1 | Toronto FC | 0 | 1 | 1
W4 | Houston Dynamo | 0 | 0 | 0
W2 | Seattle Sounders FC | 2 | 3 | 5

MLS Cup; December 9 – Toronto, Ontario
E1 | Toronto FC | 2
W2 | Seattle Sounders FC | 0

== Knockout round ==
=== Summary ===
| Team 1 | Score | Team 2 |
|---|---|---|
Eastern Conference
| Chicago Fire (E3) | 0–4 | New York Red Bulls (E6) |
| Atlanta United FC (E4) | 0–0 (a.e.t.) (1–3 p) | Columbus Crew SC (E5) |
Western Conference
| Vancouver Whitecaps FC (W3) | 5–0 | San Jose Earthquakes (W6) |
| Houston Dynamo (W4) | 1–0 (a.e.t.) | Sporting Kansas City (W5) |

=== Eastern Conference ===
October 25
7:30 pm CDT

| Chicago Fire | 0–4 | New York Red Bulls |
|---|---|---|
| | Report | Wright-Phillips 7'; Kljestan 11'; Royer 70'; Verón 87' |

Toyota Park, Bridgeview, Illinois
Attendance: 11,647
Referee: Ismail Elfath

October 26
7:00 pm EDT

| Atlanta United FC | 0–0 (a.e.t.) | Columbus Crew SC |
|---|---|---|
| | Report |
Penalties
| Gressel (penalty missed); González Pirez (penalty missed); Villalba (penalty scored); Larentowicz (penalty missed) | 1–3 | (penalty scored) Higuaín; (penalty missed) Manneh; (penalty scored) Hansen; (penalty scored) Jahn |

Mercedes-Benz Stadium, Atlanta, Georgia
Attendance: 67,221
Referee: Allen Chapman

=== Western Conference ===
October 25
7:30 pm PDT

| Vancouver Whitecaps FC | 5–0 | San Jose Earthquakes |
|---|---|---|
| Montero 33'; Techera 57'; Waston 64'; Mezquida 78', 80' | Report |

BC Place, Vancouver, British Columbia
Attendance: 21,083
Referee: José Carlos Rivero

October 26
8:30 pm CDT

| Houston Dynamo | 1–0 (a.e.t.) | Sporting Kansas City |
|---|---|---|
| Elis 94' | Report |

BBVA Compass Stadium, Houston, Texas
Attendance: 14,126
Referee: Mark Geiger

== Conference semifinals ==
=== Summary ===
| Team 1 | Agg. | Team 2 | 1st leg | 2nd leg |
|---|---|---|---|---|
Eastern Conference
| New York Red Bulls (E6) | 2–2 (a) | Toronto FC (E1) | 1–2 | 1–0 |
| Columbus Crew SC (E5) | 4–3 | New York City FC (E2) | 4–1 | 0–2 |
Western Conference
| Houston Dynamo (W4) | 2–1 | Portland Timbers (W1) | 0–0 | 2–1 |
| Vancouver Whitecaps FC (W3) | 0–2 | Seattle Sounders FC (W2) | 0–0 | 0–2 |

=== Eastern Conference ===
October 30
7:00 pm EDT

| New York Red Bulls | 1–2 | Toronto FC |
|---|---|---|
| Royer 45+3' (pen.) | Report | Vázquez 8'; Giovinco 72' |

Red Bull Arena, Harrison, New Jersey
Attendance: 18,107
Referee: Drew Fischer
November 5
3:00 pm EST

| Toronto FC | 0–1 | New York Red Bulls |
|---|---|---|
| | Report | Wright-Phillips 53' |

BMO Field, Toronto, Ontario
Attendance: 29,974
Referee: Chris Penso

2–2 on aggregate. Toronto FC won on away goals.

October 31
8:00 pm EDT

| Columbus Crew SC | 4–1 | New York City FC |
|---|---|---|
| Kamara 6'; Artur 58'; Meram 69'; Afful 90+3' | Report | Villa 78' |

Mapfre Stadium, Columbus, Ohio
Attendance: 14,416
Referee: Alan Kelly
November 5
5:00 pm EST

| New York City FC | 2–0 | Columbus Crew SC |
|---|---|---|
| Villa 16' (pen.); Struna 53' | Report |

Yankee Stadium, New York City, New York
Attendance: 23,246
Referee: Kevin Stott

Columbus Crew SC won 4–3 on aggregate.

=== Western Conference ===
October 29
5:30 pm PDT

| Vancouver Whitecaps FC | 0–0 | Seattle Sounders FC |
|---|---|---|
| | Report |

BC Place, Vancouver, British Columbia
Attendance: 27,837
Referee: Kevin Stott
November 2
7:30 pm PDT

| Seattle Sounders FC | 2–0 | Vancouver Whitecaps FC |
|---|---|---|
| Dempsey 56', 88' | Report |

CenturyLink Field, Seattle, Washington
Attendance: 39,587
Referee: Baldomero Toledo

Seattle Sounders FC won 2–0 on aggregate.

October 30
8:30 pm CDT

| Houston Dynamo | 0–0 | Portland Timbers |
|---|---|---|
| | Report |

BBVA Compass Stadium, Houston, Texas
Attendance: 15,169
Referee: Robert Sibiga
November 5
4:30 pm PST

| Portland Timbers | 1–2 | Houston Dynamo |
|---|---|---|
| Asprilla 39' | Report | Remick 43'; Manotas 77' |

Providence Park, Portland, Oregon
Attendance: 21,144
Referee: Ismail Elfath

Houston Dynamo won 2–1 on aggregate.

== Conference finals ==
=== Summary ===
| Team 1 | Agg. | Team 2 | 1st leg | 2nd leg |
|---|---|---|---|---|
Eastern Conference
| Columbus Crew SC (E5) | 0–1 | Toronto FC (E1) | 0–0 | 0–1 |
Western Conference
| Houston Dynamo (W4) | 0–5 | Seattle Sounders FC (W2) | 0–2 | 0–3 |

=== Eastern Conference ===
November 21
8:00 pm EST

| Columbus Crew SC | 0–0 | Toronto FC |
|---|---|---|
| | Report |

Mapfre Stadium, Columbus, Ohio
Attendance: 21,289
Referee: Robert Sibiga
November 29
7:30 pm EST

| Toronto FC | 1–0 | Columbus Crew SC |
|---|---|---|
| Altidore 60' | Report |

BMO Field, Toronto, Ontario
Attendance: 30,392
Referee: Jair Marrufo

Toronto FC won 1–0 on aggregate.

=== Western Conference ===
November 21
9:00 pm CST

| Houston Dynamo | 0–2 | Seattle Sounders FC |
|---|---|---|
| | Report | Svensson 11'; Bruin 42' |

BBVA Compass Stadium, Houston, Texas
Attendance: 22,661
Referee: Chris Penso
November 30
7:30 pm PST

| Seattle Sounders FC | 3–0 | Houston Dynamo |
|---|---|---|
| Rodríguez 22'; Dempsey 57'; Bruin 73' | Report |

CenturyLink Field, Seattle, Washington
Attendance: 45,298
Referee: Hilario Grajeda

Seattle Sounders FC won 5–0 on aggregate.

== MLS Cup 2017 ==
December 9, 2017
4:00 p.m. EST

| Toronto FC | 2–0 | Seattle Sounders FC |
|---|---|---|
| Altidore 67'; Vázquez 90+4' | Report |

BMO Field, Toronto, Canada
Attendance: 30,584
Referee: Allen Chapman

== Goalscorers ==
| Rank | Player | Club | Goals |
|---|---|---|---|
| 1 | (United States) Clint Dempsey | Seattle Sounders FC | 3 |
| 2 | (United States) Jozy Altidore | Toronto FC | 2 |
| 2 | (United States) Will Bruin | Seattle Sounders FC | 2 |
| 2 | (Uruguay) Nicolás Mezquida | Vancouver Whitecaps FC | 2 |
| 2 | (Austria) Daniel Royer | New York Red Bulls | 2 |
| 2 | (Spain) Víctor Vázquez | Toronto FC | 2 |
| 2 | (Spain) David Villa | New York City FC | 2 |
| 2 | (England) Bradley Wright-Phillips | New York Red Bulls | 2 |
| 9 | (Ghana) Harrison Afful | Columbus Crew SC | 1 |
| 9 | (Brazil) Artur | Columbus Crew SC | 1 |
| 9 | (Honduras) Alberth Elis | Houston Dynamo | 1 |
| 9 | (Italy) Sebastian Giovinco | Toronto FC | 1 |
| 9 | (Norway) Ola Kamara | Columbus Crew SC | 1 |
| 9 | (United States) Sacha Kljestan | New York Red Bulls | 1 |
| 9 | (Iraq) Justin Meram | Columbus Crew SC | 1 |
| 9 | (Colombia) Fredy Montero | Vancouver Whitecaps FC | 1 |
| 9 | (Spain) Víctor Rodríguez | Seattle Sounders FC | 1 |
| 9 | (Slovenia) Andraž Struna | New York City FC | 1 |
| 9 | (Sweden) Gustav Svensson | Seattle Sounders FC | 1 |
| 9 | (Uruguay) Cristian Techera | Vancouver Whitecaps FC | 1 |
| 9 | (Argentina) Gonzalo Verón | New York Red Bulls | 1 |
| 9 | (Costa Rica) Kendall Waston | Vancouver Whitecaps FC | 1 |
