= Ty Keough =

American soccer player (born 1956)

Personal information
- Full name: William Keough
- Date of birth: December 19, 1956 (age 69)
- Place of birth: St. Louis, Missouri, United States
- Height: 6 ft 0 in (1.83 m)
- Position: Midfielder

College career
Years	Team	Apps	(Gls)
1975–1978	Saint Louis Billikens		

Senior career*
Years	Team	Apps	(Gls)
1978–1979	Cincinnati Kids (indoor)	23	(13)
1979–1982	San Diego Sockers	92	(0)
1979–1985	St. Louis Steamers (indoor)	196	(45)
1985–1986	Kansas City Comets (indoor)	41	(2)

International career
1979–1980	United States	8	(0)

Managerial career
- 1986–1997: Washington Bears
- * Club domestic league appearances and goals

William “Ty” Keough (born December 19, 1956, in St. Louis, Missouri) is an American former professional soccer player and coach who has served as a soccer broadcaster for several networks. He earned eight caps with the U.S. national team in 1979 and 1980. He was a member of the U.S. Olympic soccer team which qualified for the 1980 Summer Olympics. However, he did not attend the tournament as the U.S. boycotted those games.

== Youth ==
Keough is the son of U.S. soccer legend Harry Keough, a member of the U.S. team at the 1950 FIFA World Cup. His father later entered coaching and Keough benefited from his father's instruction, developing into an excellent midfielder. Keough attended St. Louis University High School, graduating in 1975. After graduating from high school, he entered St. Louis University where he played on the men's soccer team, coached by his father from 1975 to 1978. During his four seasons with the Billikens, Keough was a four-time All-American, first team in 1976 and 1978, and honorable mention (third team) in 1975 and 1977.

== Playing career ==
The San Diego Sockers of the North American Soccer League (NASL) selected Keough in the 1979 draft and he spent four seasons with the Sockers. While still with the Sockers, Keough also played with the St. Louis Steamers in the Major Indoor Soccer League (MISL) from 1980 to 1985. In 1985, the Steamers traded him to the Kansas City Comets where he spent a single season before retiring from playing professionally.

== National and Olympic teams ==
In 1979, Keough entered the national team. His first cap came in a February 3, 1979, loss to the Soviet Union. He also began playing for the U.S. Olympic team as it began qualification for the 1980 Summer Olympics to be held in Moscow. Qualifications continued into 1980 and the U.S. ultimately qualified for the games, its first qualification since the 1972 Summer Olympics. However, President Jimmy Carter declared that the United States would boycott the games after the Soviet Union invaded Afghanistan. Despite this disappointment, Keough continued to play for the senior team through the rest of the year. His last game with the team came in a November 9, 1980, loss to Mexico. Over his two years with the national team, he earned eight caps.

== Coaching ==
After retiring from playing, Keough entered the coaching ranks with Washington University in his hometown of St. Louis. He succeeded Joe Carenza Jr., in 1986. Over the next eleven seasons, he compiled a 136–47–17 record before resigning in 1997 to devote his time to his broadcast career. While no longer coaching at the university level, Keough remains in coaching as part of the staff of the Northwest Soccer Camp.

== Broadcast career ==
While coaching with Washington University, Keough entered the broadcast career field. From 1990 until 2002, Keough covered four World Cups for TNT, ESPN and ABC.
