= MLS on TSN =

Major League Soccer broadcasts on Canadian television

MLS on TSN is the branding used for TSN's telecasts of Major League Soccer (MLS) matches. TSN first acquired rights to MLS in 2011.

== History ==
In February 2011, CTVglobemedia announced a six-year deal for national MLS broadcast rights in Canada. TSN and TSN2 would broadcast 24 matches during the 2011 season and air a minimum of 30 matches per season during the subsequent five seasons, all featuring at least one Canadian team. French-language sister networks RDS and RDS2 had similar broadcast rights. The networks also carried the MLS Cup and select playoff matches, the MLS All-Star Game, and additional matches not involving Canadian teams. GolTV continued to carry selected all-U.S. MLS matches.

Toronto FC regional matches were split between TSN and the Sportsnet networks (their parent companies, Rogers Communications and Bell Canada, jointly own a stake in TFC's parent company Maple Leaf Sports & Entertainment). In 2014, TSN acquired rights to Vancouver Whitecaps FC regional matches.

In 2017, Bell Media reached a five-year extension to its English-language rights to Major League Soccer, with coverage remaining similar to previous seasons (though with French-language rights moving to rival network TVA Sports, and the option for matches to be simulcast on broadcast network CTV). TSN also assumed exclusive rights to Toronto FC.

On December 15, 2021, MLS announced that it would be continuing with the same Canadian broadcasters for 2022. TSN will broadcast all Toronto FC and Vancouver Whitecaps games while TVA Sports will cover CF Montréal in French. TSN will also broadcast select additional matches, and CTV will show eight MLS games.

TSN acquired national rights to select MLS games for the 2023–2026 seasons. TSN will broadcast at least one match per week featuring a Canadian team, eight playoff matches, and the MLS Cup Final. Matches aired on TSN are non-exclusive and will also be available in Canada on MLS Season Pass.

Network	Contract	Annual rights fee	Regular-season games	Playoff games	Language	Ref
TSN	2023–2026	TBA	~68	8	English	
RDS	2023–2026	TBA	~68	8	French	
TSN / TSN2	2022		60+		English	
TVA Sports	2022		30+		French	
TSN / TSN2	2017–2021		TBD		English	
TVA Sports	2017–2021		50+		French	
TSN / TSN2	2011–2016		30		English	
RDS	2012–2016		30		French	

== Commentators ==
- Luke Wileman (host and lead play-by-play)
- Steven Caldwell (lead TSN soccer analyst)
- Kevin Kilbane (TSN soccer analyst)
- Terry Dunfield (TSN soccer analyst)
- Gareth Wheeler (TSN soccer radio host)
- Blake Price (play-by-play)
- Paul Dolan (TSN soccer analyst)
- Joey Alfieri (play-by-play)
- Vic Rauter (play-by-play)
- Greg Sutton (TSN soccer analyst)
- Matt Cullen (play-by-play)
- Jim Brennan (TSN soccer analyst)
- Jon Still (play-by-play)
