= Claudine Douville =

Canadian sports journalist and novelist

- Born: Montreal, Quebec
- Education: Laval University (B.A.)
- Occupations: sports journalist, novelist
- Television: Plein air sans limites

Claudine Douville is a Québécoise sports journalist, amateur athlete and author of adventure novels.

== Early life and education ==
Claudine Douville was born in Montréal. Passionate about sports from her youth, radio broadcasts of ice hockey games inspired her career in sports journalism. She holds a BA in journalism from Laval University with minors in physical education and theatre.

== Career ==
In 1980, she was hired by TVSQ (Télévision des sports du Québec, which was later replaced by Réseau des sports (RDS). She has been working as a sports journalist and columnist since 1989. She is the host of Plein air sans limites (English: Outdoor without limits).

Douville has covered major sporting events, such as the Olympic Games. She also provides commentary on many disciplines, including soccer at the World Cup and Champions League matches. In 2008, along with three other women, she gave play-by-play commentary at a National Hockey League match.

Douville has written several adventure novels. The first, La Louve des mers published in 2008, features the eighteenth-century adventures of Marie Galligan, and was successful enough to have a sequel the following year, Le Loup des îles, which completed the story. Douville did research in Montana for her third novel, Une Histoire de cowboy (A Cowboy Story, 2010).

== Private life ==
Douville practices scuba diving, karate, alpine skiing, kayaking, fencing and mountaineering. She climbed Mount Kilimanjaro and to Everest Base Camp. The journalist has taken part in several rally raids (long-distance off-road races), including the all-female Raid Amazones. With Louise Bergeron, she won the 2002 edition of the Rallye Aicha des Gazelles in Morocco.

Married, she is the mother of three children. Weakened by celiac disease, she says she evokes the subject in order to "show to those who suffer from it that, if it sometimes complicates life, that does not prevent anything".

== Awards ==
In 2011, Douville was admitted to the hall of fame of the Club de la médaille d'or (English: Gold Medal Club) for her contributions to the promotion of amateur sport in Quebec. Inducted alongside her were Guy Lafleur and Marc Gagnon.

== Selected works ==
Novels

- Douville, Claudine (2008). La Louve des mers (in French). Libre Expression. ISBN 9782764804179.
- Douville, Claudine (2009). Le Loup des îles (in French). Libre Expression. ISBN 9782764804612.
- Douville, Claudine (2010). Une Histoire de cowboy (in French). Libre Expression. ISBN 9782764804926.
- Mission sacrée (Holy Mission) trilogy:
  - Douville, Claudine (2012). Les Esprits de l'Amazonie (in French). Libre Expression. ISBN 9782764805787.
  - Douville, Claudine (2013). Le souffle de l'Arctique (in French). Libre Expression. ISBN 9782764808191.
  - Douville, Claudine (2014). Les seigneurs du désert (in French). Libre Expression. ISBN 9782764810156.
