= Max Bretos =

American sports reporter and sports announcer

Maximiliano Bretos is an American sports reporter and sports announcer, who is currently the play-by-play announcer for MLS broadcasts on Apple TV. He formerly hosted ESPN Major League Soccer and SportsCenter for ESPN as well as being the lead announcer for Fox Soccer from 2003–2010 and Los Angeles FC from 2018–2022. Bretos' broadcast specialization is football.

== Early years ==
Bretos attended the Judith Weston Acting Studio in Los Angeles, California, and formerly played for Santa Monica Rugby Club. Bretos earned a degree in international relations from Florida State University in 1994. He also dabbled in modeling.

== Broadcasting career ==
Bretos worked for Fox Soccer Channel/Fox Sports World (1997–2009) where he was the voice of the first English language, 24-hour international sports channel. While at Fox he also worked for Sky Sports in the United Kingdom (2003–2006) as well as the WWE Company in 2007. His broadcasting catchphrase was "Schelotto, yeah!" In January 2010, he resigned from FSC to take a position with ESPNews.

=== Controversy ===
On February 18, 2012, Bretos used the term "chink in the armor" in reference to New York Knicks point guard Jeremy Lin, an Asian, while on air as an ESPNews anchor. He was suspended for 30 days. "My wife is Asian, so I’m basically a dork," apologized Bretos on Twitter. Spero Dedes was another announcer who used that reference.

Bretos, whose parents are both Cuban, has been at the forefront of advancing the Latino presence at ESPN. In Summer 2013, he interviewed Dodgers right fielder Yasiel Puig in both English and Spanish. In September 2013, he also co-hosted ESPN's Hispanic heritage special One Nacion.

=== Los Angeles FC ===
In February 2018, Bretos was announced as the new lead play-by-play broadcaster on YouTube TV for Los Angeles Football Club in Major League Soccer. He continued his anchoring duties on SportsCenter at ESPN's Los Angeles studios until late 2018.

== Podcast ==
From February 2017 until early 2019, Max co-hosted the Max and Herc podcast with Herculez Gomez. The podcast was a professionally produced cast on the topic of soccer, and was part of the ESPN family of podcasts. Bretos announced through a tweet that the podcast had come to an end in early 2019, to focus on his responsibilities with LAFC.

Starting in early 2021, Max announced his new podcast project, The Soccer OG, interviewing other figures in the soccer landscape and offering his perspective on developments in the USMNT, MLS and other parts of global football. As of December 2022, the podcast has over 130 episodes.
