= Julie Stewart-Binks =

Canadian journalist (born 1987)

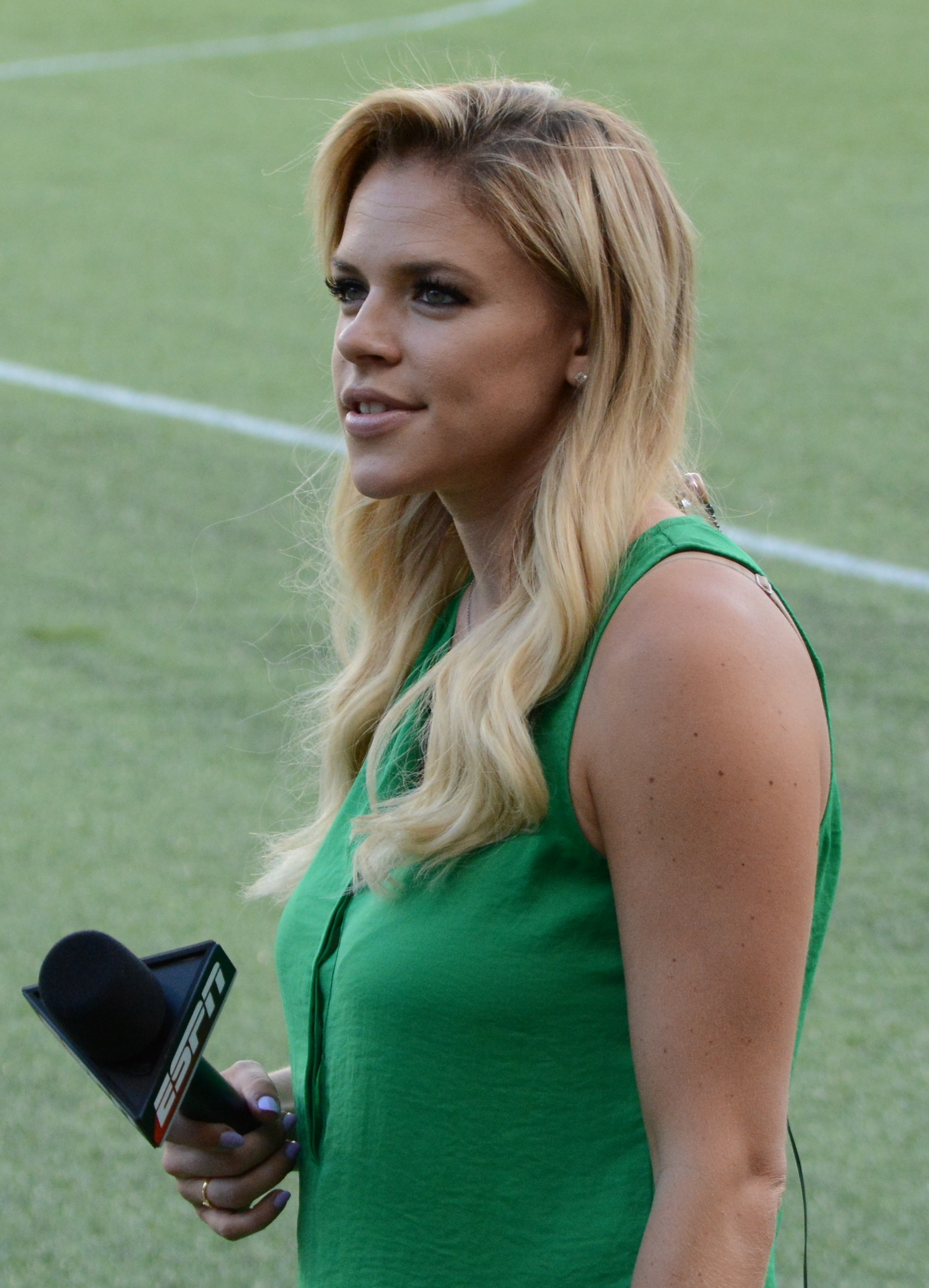
- Stewart-Binks on the sideline at a U.S. Open Cup match in 2017
- Born: Julie Stewart-Binks; April 30, 1987 (age 39); Toronto, Ontario
- Education: Queen's University; City, University of London
- Occupation: Soccer/hockey sideline reporter
- Years active: 2010–present

Julie Stewart-Binks (born April 30, 1987) is a Canadian journalist who has worked for Barstool Sports, ESPN, and Fox Sports. Stewart-Binks worked as a rinkside reporter for the 2022 Stanley Cup playoffs on TNT.

== Early years ==
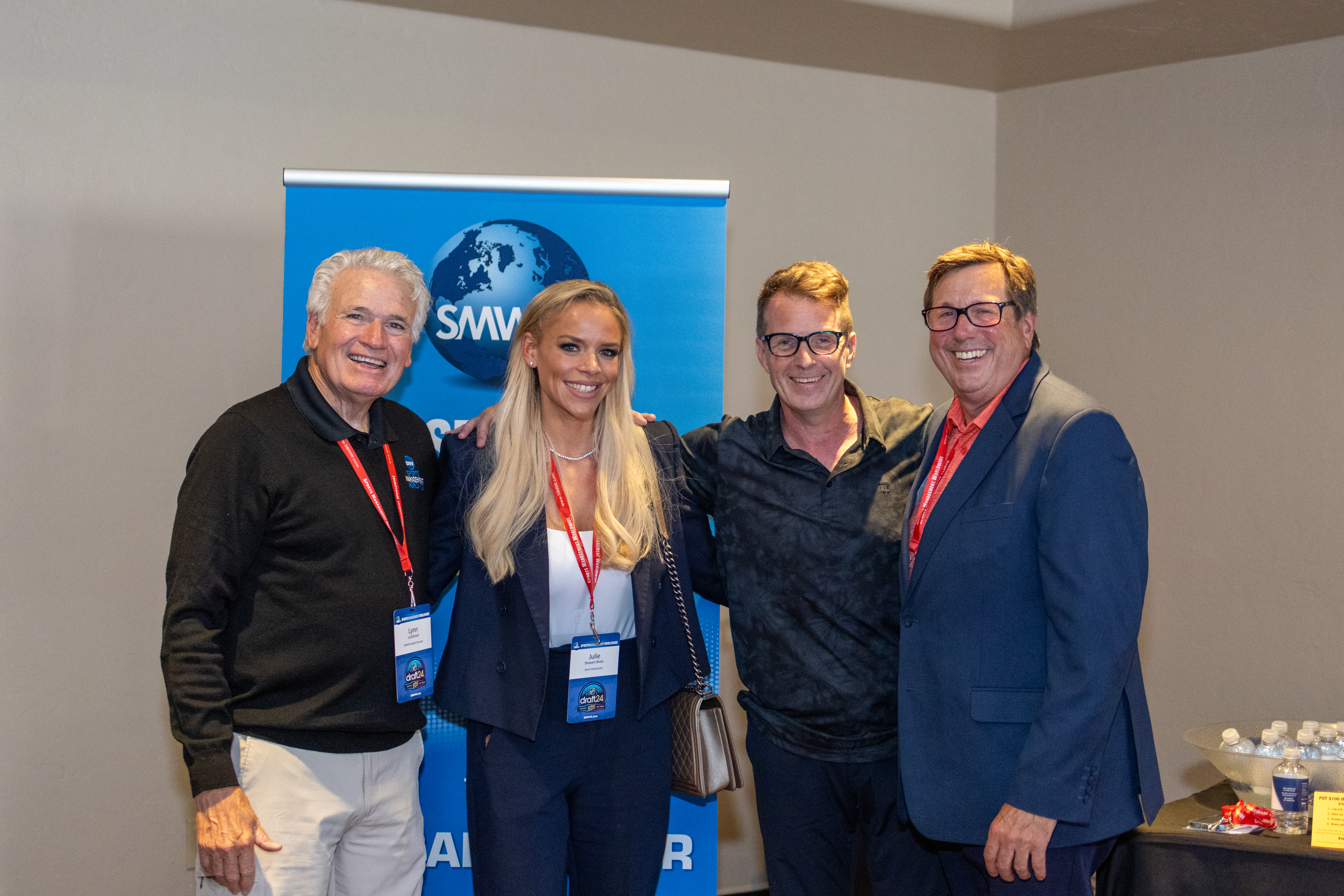
2024 SMWW Hockey Career Conference media panel Dr. Lynn Lashbrook (far left), Julie Stewart-Binks, Jeff Marek, EJ Hradek (Far right)

Stewart-Binks was born in Toronto, Ontario, where she attended Havergal College. She graduated from Queen’s University in Kingston, Ontario, with a couple of undergraduate degrees. She also graduated from City, University of London, where she received her master's degree in international broadcast journalism. She is a graduate of Sports Management Worldwide's "Hockey GM & Scouting" course and speaks at the annual SMWW Hockey Career Conference.

== Career ==
In 2010, Stewart-Binks was hired as a program assistant at the Canadian Broadcasting Corporation. She also was a reporter for the National Hockey League team Toronto Maple Leafs. In July 2011, she was hired to the anchor desk by Fox Soccer Channel’s flagship program in Winnipeg, Manitoba. She was also a reporter for CTV Television Network in Regina, Saskatchewan. While working at CTV in Regina, she covered the 2012 NHL Draft, which sparked her move to Fox Sports 1. She pitched a piece on Saskatchewan native Ryan Murray’s experience during draft week. After she finished the story, Murray’s agent Rick Valette talked to his agency about the possibility of representing her. This ultimately led to her move to the United States.

=== Fox Sports ===
In June 2013, Stewart-Binks was hired by Fox Sports as a news update anchor with Fox Sports 1 at the new network’s studios in Los Angeles, California. She also hosted "Fox Soccer Daily", a 30-minute daily studio soccer show, as well as reporting from the 2014 Winter Olympic Games in Sochi. She covered the MLS All-Star Game in Denver and also covered the MLS soccer match between Chicago Fire-FC Dallas. In 2015, she became Fox's regular sideline reporter for their newly acquired MLS matches.

=== ESPN ===
In December 2016, Stewart-Binks was hired by ESPN as a sideline reporter for MLS and U.S. Men’s and Women’s National Team games. She also filled in as a sideline reporter on ESPN's College Football games. She became the first female reporter to call two straight MLS Cups with two different networks (FOX and ESPN).

=== Barstool Sports ===
In 2017, Stewart-Binks joined Barstool Sports as the host of Barstool Breakfast on Sirius XM 85. On May 16, 2018, she announced she was leaving Barstool Sports Radio and would take some time off to contemplate her next career move.

=== Fubo Sports Network ===
On September 9, 2019, fuboTV announced that Stewart-Binks would be hosting two new sports-oriented talk shows on fubo Sports Network, "Call It A Night with Julie-Stewart-Binks" and "Drinks With Binks."

== Sexual assault allegations ==
In January 2025, Stewart-Binks filed a lawsuit against Fox News and Charlie Dixon, a senior executive, alleging sexual assault that occurred in 2016. The lawsuit was filed in Los Angeles County Superior Court on January 31, 2025, and claims that Dixon assaulted her after inviting her to his hotel room under the pretense of discussing Super Bowl preparations. According to the lawsuit, during a meeting on January 27, 2016, Dixon allegedly made derogatory comments about Stewart-Binks' abilities and suggested she was not attractive enough for television. He then invited her to his hotel room for a drink and to see the view. Once there, he allegedly pinned her against a wall, restrained her arms, and attempted to kiss her forcibly. The complaint states that Stewart-Binks managed to push him away and escape the situation.

Following the incident, Stewart-Binks reported the assault to Fox's human resources department during an investigation into another executive's conduct. However, she claims that instead of taking action against Dixon, Fox chose to protect him, allowing him to remain in his position for nearly a decade. As a result of this alleged retaliation, her contract with Fox was not renewed shortly after the incident.

Stewart-Binks' lawsuit followed another lawsuit filed by hairstylist Noushin Faraji, who accused Dixon and others of fostering a toxic work environment characterized by sexual harassment and misconduct. Faraji claimed that during the incident, he placed his arm on her lower back and then grabbed her buttocks despite her discomfort. Additionally, Faraji's complaint suggests that Dixon had made inappropriate comments about needing sexual favors for contract renewals.

Stewart-Binks indicated that Faraji's case motivated her to come forward with her own allegations.

In response to the allegations, Fox Sports stated that they had previously addressed these claims through an investigation conducted by a third party, but they did not disclose the findings or actions taken as a result of that investigation. Dixon was placed on administrative leave after the two lawsuits were filed. (Note: Dixon was subsequently fired for reasons unrelated to the allegations of sexual assault.)

Stewart-Binks sought unspecified damages and injunctive relief. In July 2025, Stewart-Binks asked the court to dismiss the suit. She and Fox News both issued statements that the "matter has been resolved."
