= Jeremy St. Louis =

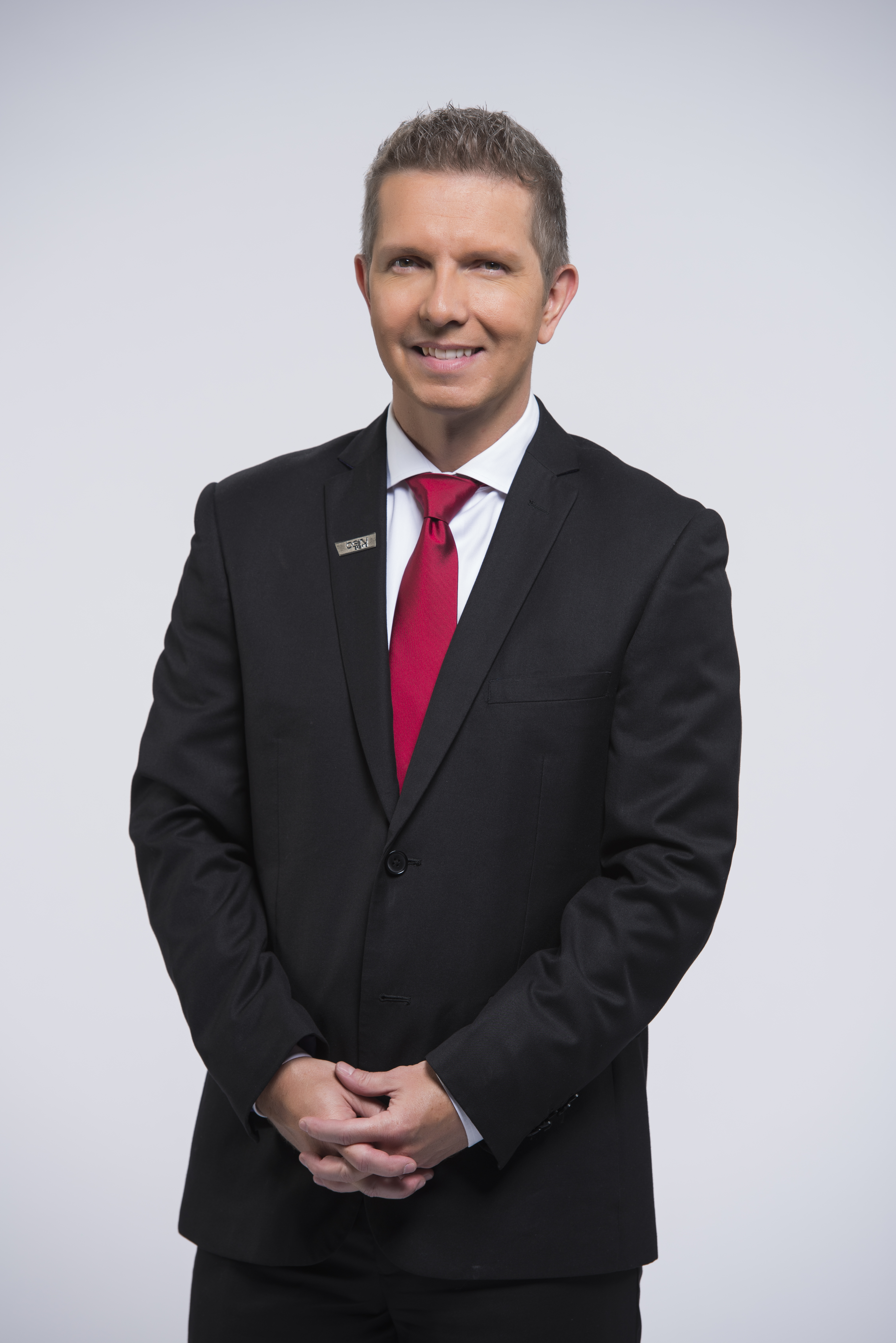
Profile Photo

Jeremy St. Louis (born October 22, 1971, in Winnipeg, Manitoba) is a Canadian TV and radio journalist. He has worked for CBS Sports HQ, Fox Soccer Report on Fox Soccer Channel and Fox Sports World Canada, and beIN Sports USA and beIN Sports Canada.

== Early career ==
St.Louis holds a Bachelor of Science degree from Lakehead University. He graduated from the Southern Alberta Institute of Technology broadcast journalism program in Calgary in the spring of 1996.

His first job was at CKLQ in Brandon, Manitoba, in the fall of 1996.

In the fall of 1997, he accepted his first TV position in Yorkton, Saskatchewan, as an anchor/reporter at CICC-TV - a CTV affiliate at the time.

In the spring of 1998, St.Louis accepted a position in Medicine Hat, Alberta as the lead sports anchor at CHAT-TV.

In December 2000, St.Louis accepted a position as weather anchor & community/news reporter for Global Television in Winnipeg.CKND-TV

== Fox Sports USA/Canada ==
Shortly after September 11, 2001, St.Louis moved into a part-time position as anchor/reporter on Fox Sports World Canada on an international sports highlights show.

He was hired as a full-time anchor when Sportslink went to seven days a week and was re-branded as the Fox Sports World Report in 2002.

In 2006, the Fox Sports World Report re-launched as the new Fox Soccer Report with St. Louis, Carlos Machado, Derek Taylor and Mitch Peacock as hosts.

In August 2007, St.Louis was one of two Canadian reporters to interview former England captain David Beckham during his first trip to Toronto in MLS.

In 2010, St.Louis travelled to Madrid, Spain to take part in Fox Soccer Channel coverage of the UEFA Champions League Final. Alongside Fox Sports NFL host Curt Menefee and former US International Eric Wynalda, Los Angeles Galaxy coach Bruce Arena, former English player Warren Barton and Fox Soccer Report analyst Bobby McMahon.

== beIN SPORTS USA ==
St.Louis joined beIN Sports in January 2013 as on-air talent and Senior Producer.

In January 2020, St.Louis announced he had left beIN SPORTS after opting not to renew his current contract.

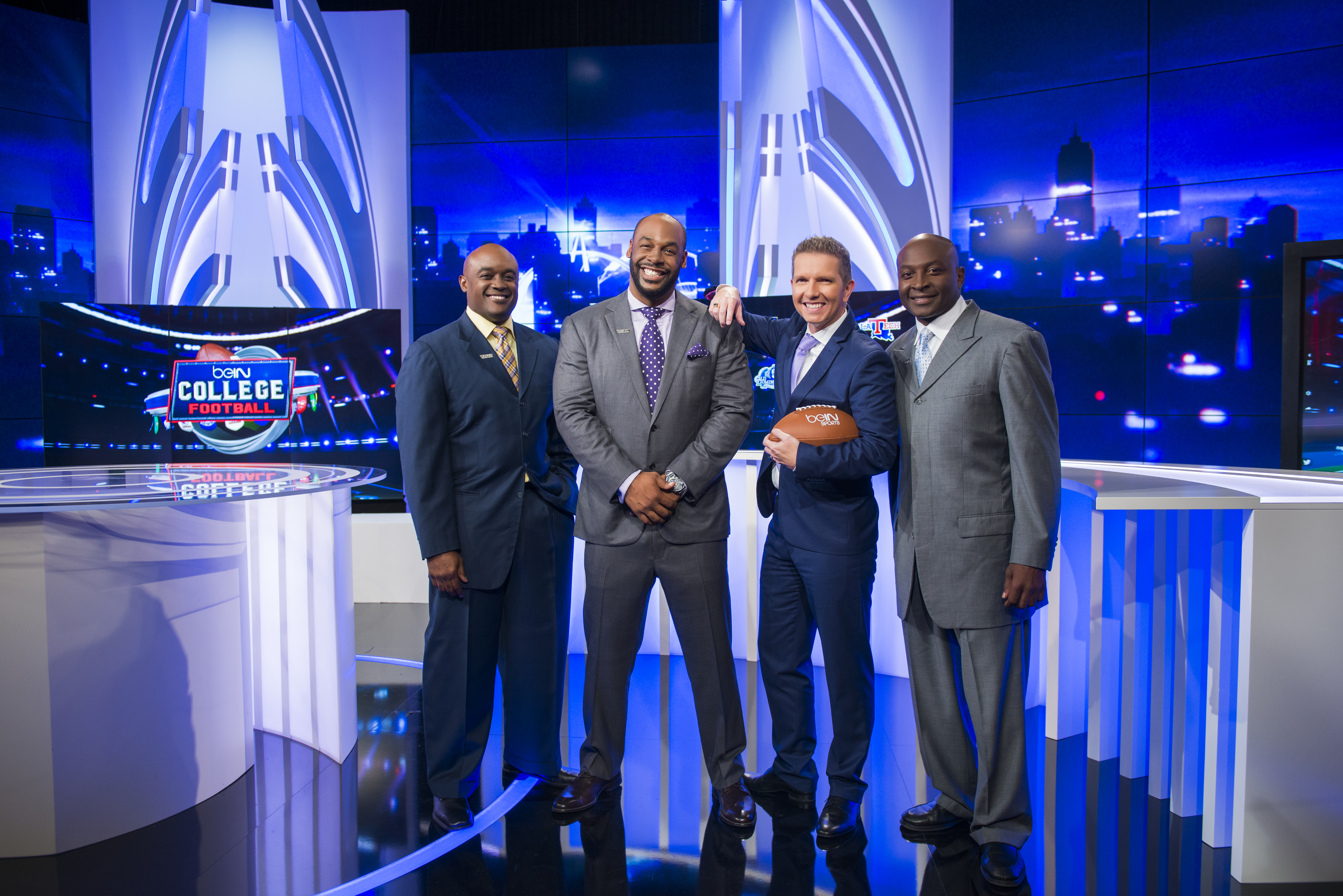
Group photo - beINSPORTS College Football

== CBS Sports ==
In September 2019, St.Louis joined CBS SPORTS as an anchor on the digital channel CBS Sports HQ. He left the network in December 2024.

== Hall of Fame ==
On November 22, 2013, St.Louis was officially inducted into the Lindsay Thurber Comprehensive High School 'Hall of Fame' in Red Deer, Alberta. He became the 60th former student inducted to the Hall.
