= Fox Soccer Report =

Soccer program

- Starring: Michelle Lissel, Eoin O'Callaghan, Asa Rehman, and Bobby McMahon
- Country of origin: Canada

Production
- Running time: 60 min.

Original release
- Network: Fox Soccer; Fox Sports World Canada
- Release: August 16, 2012

Fox Soccer Report was Fox Soccer's flagship studio program. The show was produced by Fox Sports World Canada, a Canadian international sports network owned by Shaw Media (parent of Global Television Network), from CKND-TV's studios in Winnipeg, Manitoba. The show, formerly called Fox Sports World Report and Global SportsLink, aired nightly on Fox Soccer in the United States and EuroWorld Sport (Canada) at 10 p.m. Eastern Time (or after a live prime-time match), with numerous re-airs, usually at 1 a.m. Eastern. The show also aired on Fox Soccer Plus nightly at 11 p.m. Eastern Time.

With the shutdown of Fox Sports World in April 2012, Fox Soccer Report continued to be produced until August 16, 2012, when it was replaced by Fox Soccer News, a new soccer news program produced by Sportsnet out of Toronto, the following day.

== Anchors ==
The program featured multiple sportscasters that alternated on different days of the week. Its final lineup was anchored by Michelle Lissel, Eoin O'Callaghan and Asa Rehman. Former Scottish amateur soccer player Bobby McMahon was featured on Mondays and Fridays, providing analysis of the weekend's matches.

== Former anchors ==
- Mitch Peacock
- Carlos Machado
- Nabil Karim
- Terri Leigh
- Lara Baldesarra
- Jeremy St. Louis
- Derek Taylor
- Julie Stewart-Binks
