= Fox Sports World =

Fox Sports World may refer to the following TV channels:

- Fox Soccer, formerly Fox Sports World
- Fox Sports World Canada
