= Terri Leigh =

- Born: Terri Leigh; December 23, 1981 (age 44); Manitoba, Canada
- Years active: 2008–present
- Website: https://twitter.com/TerriLeighTV

Terri Leigh (born December 23, 1981) is a Canadian television anchor and was a member of the Fox Soccer Report on-air talent team since October 2008.

On September 5, 2010, she announced her departure from Fox Soccer Channel on air. She now hosts The Express on beIN Sports Channel.

== Radio career ==
Terri Leigh got her start in media at the age of 15 with the Canadian radio network Golden West Broadcasting. She credits GWB for helping launch her career and opening many doors for her within the industry. Starting off as a part-time receptionist then as a commercial producer, Terri worked her way up to become a morning drive-time show host.

In the autumn of 2010, Terri returned to radio to begin a career in sales for HOT103/QX104.

== TV career ==
In 2004 she began with CanWest Global, programming channels including Fox Sports World Canada, Xtreme Sports and MenTV. She returned to the airwaves with local Winnipeg radio station Cool FM before rejoining Global in 2008 to begin her role as a Fox Soccer Report anchor, where she remained until 2010.

In 2012 Terri relocated to Miami to join beIN Sport as co-host of The Express, a pre- and post-game analysis show, where she currently located.

Away from the camera, Terri holds the position of vice-chair with the Manitoba chapter of Canadian Women in Communications.

== Personal information ==
Raised on a small farm in southern Manitoba, Terri’s sport of choice growing up was curling.
