= Cal FC =

Soccer club from California

- Full name: Cal Football Club
- Nickname: Cal FC
- Founded: 2006
- Ground: Calabasas High School
- Capacity: 3,500
- Owner: Michael Friedman
- Head coach: Michael Friedman
- League: UPSL; USASA Region IV
- Fall 2018–2019: 1st
- Website: https://calfootballclub.com
Home colors

Cal Football Club (Cal FC) is an American soccer club based in Thousand Oaks, California. The club was founded in 2006 and competes in the UPSL Premier Division, a fourth-tier United States Adult Soccer Association and Cal South affiliated league in Southern California. The team is coached by Michael Friedman who is also Cal FC's General Manager.

The 2012 USOC team was coached by former U.S. national team player and current Fox Soccer analyst, Eric Wynalda alongside his former co-host of Fox Football Fone-In, Nick Webster.

== History ==
Cal FC started to play in the La Gran Liga de Oxnard in 2009. The team was composed mainly of players whom Michael Friedman previously coached at clubs or on a college team. The team developed over the seasons to include players from SDSU and other colleges. Critical to the team's creation and continued success were the Barrera brothers, Danny and Diego. (Friedman previously coached Barrera on a U12 AYSO team). Their addition elevated the team and brought in higher level players and off-season pros looking to get a workout. They achieved great successes in the La Gran Liga and dominated other teams.

In 2012 the team entered into the USASA Region IV. The team placed 2nd over the well respected Doxa Italia club and Cal FC earned a berth into the USOC.

The team received attention in the 2012 Lamar Hunt U.S. Open Cup, when the club upset 2012 PDL Champions Kitsap 3-1, the USL Pro side Wilmington Hammerheads 4–0 and Major League Soccer side Portland Timbers 1–0 before losing to Seattle Sounders FC 5–0 in the fourth round of the tournament.

Cal FC became the first amateur team to beat an MLS club without needing penalty kicks, as well as the first from the USASA to do so (Dallas Roma F.C. had previously defeated Chivas USA in the 2006 tournament via penalty kicks).

Cal FC, Doxa Italia, and PSA battled it out over the next few years. In 2013 Cal failed to Qualify for USOC after losing to Doxa Italia in the USASA Region IV tournament. Cal FC qualified for the 2014, 2015, and 2016 editions of the tournament.

On August 21, 2018, Cal FC announced their intention to join the second-division United Soccer League by 2020. However, on November 15, 2018, Cal FC was listed among the founding members of the professional NPSL Founders Cup. However on July 24, 2019, the Founders Cup officially re-branded to the "Members Cup" with Cal FC removed as a participant.

== Notable players ==
Players noted below have played professionally.

- (United States) Eder Arreola
- (Israel) Orr Barouch
- (United States) Danny Barrera
- (United States) Diego Barrera
- (El Salvador) Derby Carrillo
- (United States) Pablo Cruz
- (El Salvador) Richard Menjivar
- (United States) Oscar Sorto
