= Nick Webster =

Vice President of Adult Soccer

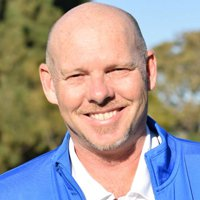
- Occupations: Football Executive, TV Personality, Coach, Advisor

Nick Webster is the Executive Vice President for the UPSL, board member of Cal South, a former soccer personality, and an acclaimed TV producer/director and leadership coach. He was formerly an on-air director, senior producer, play-by-play announcer, and chief writer for Fox Soccer Channel and foxsoccer.com. He was also the chief analyst for KDOC-TV and their Chivas USA broadcasts and the play-by-play announcer for the Orange County Blues. In May 2012, he became the Director of Content and Development for football.com. He has a video series featuring different aspects of soccer on the Livestrong network, and in 2016, published his first book, 'Re-Booting Youth Soccer 2.0', which has become required reading for new coaches and parents. His Facebook group, the Soccer Coaches Mastermind, currently boasts over 4,500 coaches and is one of the most popular soccer coaching pages on the Facebook network. Webster holds a Bachelor of Science from CSUDH and a Master's Degree in Organizational Leadership from Concordia University Irvine.

== Broadcasting & Media ==
Webster began his broadcast career with Fox Soccer Channel (then Fox Sports World). His first assignment of note was writing the copy for Lionel Bienvenu and the highly popular Premier League Review Show. By 2004, Webster was the voice of the English Premier League as he provided the majority of the wraparounds for the world's most popular league.

In addition to calling matches from the Premier League, Webster also commentated on the Italian Serie A, Spain's La Liga, the German Bundesliga, France's Ligue 1, the Dutch Eredivisie, Chile's Primera Division, the Campeonato Brasileiro Série A, and Argentina's Apertura. Additionally, he has called matches from the UEFA Cup, including the finals in 2004, 2005, and 2006, the UEFA Super Cup, World Cup Qualifying, and the Toulon Tournament.

Webster has also covered in person the following tournaments: FIFA World Cup 2002, 2006, and 2010; where he has given video summaries of the matches from South Africa; UEFA European Championship 2004, 2008 and 2024; FIFA Confederations Cup 2003; ICC 2003 Cricket World Cup; and CONCACAF Gold Cup 2001, 2003, 2005, 2007, and 2023 providing daily articles and news stories for foxsoccer.com and foxsports.com. He also provides football insights and a podcast for insideworldfootball.com

Webster was also the host and producer of Fox Football Fone-In, a call-in show for soccer fans.

Webster was the director and senior producer for the following shows at Fox Soccer. Uefa Champions League Pre-game, Half-time & Post-game, UEFA Champions League Final broadcast on Fox in 2011, Super Sunday+, Match Day, Fox Football Fone-In, Passport to Germany & South Africa. He has also won multiple Telly Awards for producing, directing, and hosting.

During the summer of 2007, Webster was the lead announcer for Bluff Poker as they held the online rights for the World Series of Poker. Webster produced twice-daily reports of the action as well as breaking down the big hands of the day. Webster is an accomplished Texas Hold 'Em player and has won the daily 'poker and ponies' tournament at Hollywood Park Casino on multiple occasions.

In 2014, Webster was named the color commentator for Chivas USA broadcasts on KDOC-TV. Later that summer, he became the host for the World Soccer Talk Premier League podcast. During the summer of 2016, he also performed as the play-by-play announcer for the Orange County Blues.

During World Cup 2018, Webster provided daily expert analysis for 5thstreetsports.com. In August 2018 Webster partnered up with Nick Geber to provide daily analysis of the English Premier League on Sirius XM Satellite Radio, Sports Byline USA, American Forces Network, SB Nation Radio and IHeartRadio, making it the most widely distributed soccer radio show in the US.

In 2023, Webster developed the Bear & the Ball podcast. This weekly show discusses all forms of the beautiful game and can be found on the Cal South web page and Apple Podcasts.

== Coaching ==
Webster is a licensed coach with the United States Soccer Federation and the United Soccer Coaches, holding his A, B, C & D licenses along with the Premier Diploma and the Director of Coaching Diploma. In January 2017, Webster completed his United Soccer Coaches Master Coach and Soccer Leader diploma, graduating with a distinguished pass. He also holds the Advanced National Goalkeeping Diploma.

Webster grew up in São Paulo, Brazil, and North London, England, attending some of the biggest club soccer matches in the world. Webster began his soccer coaching career at Occidental College, Los Angeles, as the men's assistant to Lowell Thomas. In his one season with the Tigers, Webster helped the team to 2nd place in the Southern California Intercollegiate Athletic Conference.

He then moved to Windward High School, Los Angeles, to become the Head Coach of the Boys' Varsity team. In his first season, the Wildcats won the first of eight League Championships. As an unseeded school, the Wildcats won their first-ever boys' CIF Southern Section title, defeating Carpentaria High School 2-1. Webster was named CIF Southern Section Division VI Coach of the Year.

In May 2012, Webster was appointed 1st team coach for Cal FC under the management of Eric Wynalda. The team from Thousand Oaks embarked on a historic run in the US Open Cup, beating the Kitsap Pumas, the Wilmington Hammerheads, and the Portland Timbers, the first time an amateur team had ever beaten an MLS team in the US Open Cup. The run was finally ended by the three-time defending champions, Seattle Sounders FC.

In the 2014 edition of the US Open Cup, Webster reprised his role as Head Coach and led the team against the LA Galaxy II (USL) in the 2nd round of the tournament. He also assisted Eric Wynalda and the Atlanta Silverbacks in their 5th round tie against the Colorado Rapids. A match that saw 5 red cards for the Silverbacks, including that of Wynalda and his first assistant, leaving Webster with 8 players. Webster designed a tactical plan with his remaining players, and the Silverbacks ran out 2-1 winners for one of the most dramatic wins in the competition's long and storied history.

On March 1, 2015, Webster won the United States Youth Soccer Association National Championships with CalSouth Boys' U17, beating Iowa in the final.

In the fall of 2017, Webster was the volunteer men's assistant coach for Cal State Dominguez Hills as they won the CCAA Championship.

Webster has coached numerous club teams in the Southern California region, winning multiple league and tournament titles.

In late 2018, Webster again teamed up with Eric Wynalda at the Las Vegas Lights FC in the United Soccer League, working with the first team on how to win the mental game.

In the spring of 2020, Webster began coaching at UCSB and assisting with the women's Division 1 program under Head Coach Paul Stumpf, and assisted with the Gauchos for two seasons. In 2023, he took over the boys' soccer program at Venice High School, leading them to the Los Angeles City Finals in his first season, an undefeated first league title in over twenty years in his second season and retaining that title in 2026.
