= Nick Geber =

- Born: London, England
- Presenting career
- Stations: SiriusXM Satellite Radio, iHeart Radio, Sports Byline USA, SB Nation Radio, American Forces Radio
- Time slot: 6:00 PM Pacific Time
- Show: World Soccer Radio on SiriusXM
- Style: Sports radio, Sports Television
- Country: United States
- Previous shows: World Soccer Daily, Fox Football Fone-In, Fox Football Friday, World Series of Poker, World Series of Poker Circuit, World Series of Poker Europe

Nick Geber (born in London, England) is a radio and television personality who co-hosted the Sirius Satellite Radio program World Soccer Daily (WSD)and the TV Show Fox Football Friday and Fox Football Fone-In. He is currently the host of World Soccer Radio on SiriusXM Satellite Radio.

An ardent Liverpool fan, Geber moved to the United States in 1979, where he joined in the United States Army. He met Steven Cohen, his co-host, in the radio business while working in corporate marketing. In addition to creating and hosting World Soccer Daily, Geber and Cohen hosted Fox Football Fone-in (formerly Fox Football Friday), a viewer-interactive television show on Fox Soccer Channel that roughly follows the format of WSD. Geber and Cohen are considered to have been instrumental to the growth of soccer in the United States.

Geber left WSD in order to pursue poker broadcasting and production on a full-time basis, but returned occasionally as a guest host. Howard Rogers took his place, while FSC analyst Nick Webster replaced Geber on Fox Football Fone-in. He was also the voice of the World Series of Poker Circuit and was the announcer for the Aruba Poker Classic as well as the Asian Pacific Poker Tour (APPT) Sydney Grand Final and the APPT Tournament of Champions. He co-hosted World Series of Poker Radio in 2008 and was the lead announcer alongside Howard David at the 39th, 40th and 41st Annual World Series of Poker. While working with Bluff Media, Geber pioneered the production of live streaming poker, producing the first ever major tournament poker live stream with hole cards as well as providing ESPN with their first exclusive streaming-only broadcast on ESPN360, the precursor to ESPN3. Geber also hosted the Bluff Magazine show Poker Night Radio on Sirius, and was the lead live play by play announcer from the World Series of Poker and World Series of Poker Europe on ESPN. In 2020 and 2021 Nick was the host and lead commentator for the Ed Asner and Friends Celebrity Poker Tournament.

Geber in 2012 hosted "World Soccer Radio" on the Sports Byline USA network, iHeart Radio and American Forces Network.

In 2018 Geber returned to SirusXM with World Soccer Radio now heard Monday-Friday at 6PM PT/9PM ET on SiriusXM Dan Patrick Sports 211. The show was co-hosted by former Fox Sports analyst, Nick Webster. but Nick now hosts the show alone. The show can be heard live on Sirius XM Satellite Radio, Sports Byline USA, American Forces Network, SB Nation Radio and IHeartRadio, making it the most widely distributed soccer radio show in the US.
