= Soccer Central =

- Starring: Brendan Dunlop and James Sharman
- Country of origin: Canada

Production
- Running time: 30 min. (Monday–Friday) or 60 min. (Sunday)

Original release
- Network: Sportsnet
- Release: August 17, 2012

Soccer Central was a soccer news program that was broadcast by the Canadian sports channel Sportsnet. The program was first introduced on August 17, 2012 as Fox Soccer News; the program was originally produced for U.S. cable channel Fox Soccer as a replacement for the Fox Soccer Report, which was produced out of Winnipeg by the now-defunct Fox Sports World Canada in a similar arrangement.

With the launch of Fox Sports 1, Fox Soccer News was supplanted by the in-house production Fox Soccer Daily, which premiered on August 19, 2013. Consequently, Fox Soccer News was re-branded as Soccer Central (the original name of Sportsnet's soccer pre-game show, which had been renamed Soccer Central Matchday).

The show aired as a half an hour show from Monday through Friday (Monday-Thursday known as Soccer Central and Friday known as The Soccer Central Roundtable) and an hour show (Soccer Central Weekend Review) on Sunday.

== Anchors ==
The program had 2 co-anchors each night, rotating among Brendan Dunlop, James Sharman (both of whom previously hosted soccer-related programs on The Score before its purchase by Rogers), Ben Ennis and Sarah Davis. Regularly appearing analysts include former Scottish amateur footballer Bobby McMahon, retired English footballer Danny Dichio, Dutch soccer coach Thomas Rongen, and former professional soccer player Lloyd Barker. Guest hosts have included Brad Fay and Gene Principe.

Upon its re-formatting as Soccer Central, Dunlop and Sharmen both do 2-3 solo shows, and co-anchor the Sunday Weekend Review show.
