= Mitch Peacock =

Canadian sportscaster

Mitch Peacock is a Canadian sportscaster, currently serving as the radio play-by-play announcer and Director of Media for the Manitoba Moose of the American Hockey League.

Prior to joining the Moose organization, he was a news anchor with CBC Winnipeg and a sideline reporter on Hockey Night In Canada. Peacock also worked a variety of roles for CBC covering soccer events including the 2010 FIFA World Cup and Toronto FC matches. He has also served as the anchor for the Fox Soccer Report on both Fox Soccer Channel and Fox Sports World Canada.
