= Clive Owen =

British actor (born 1964)

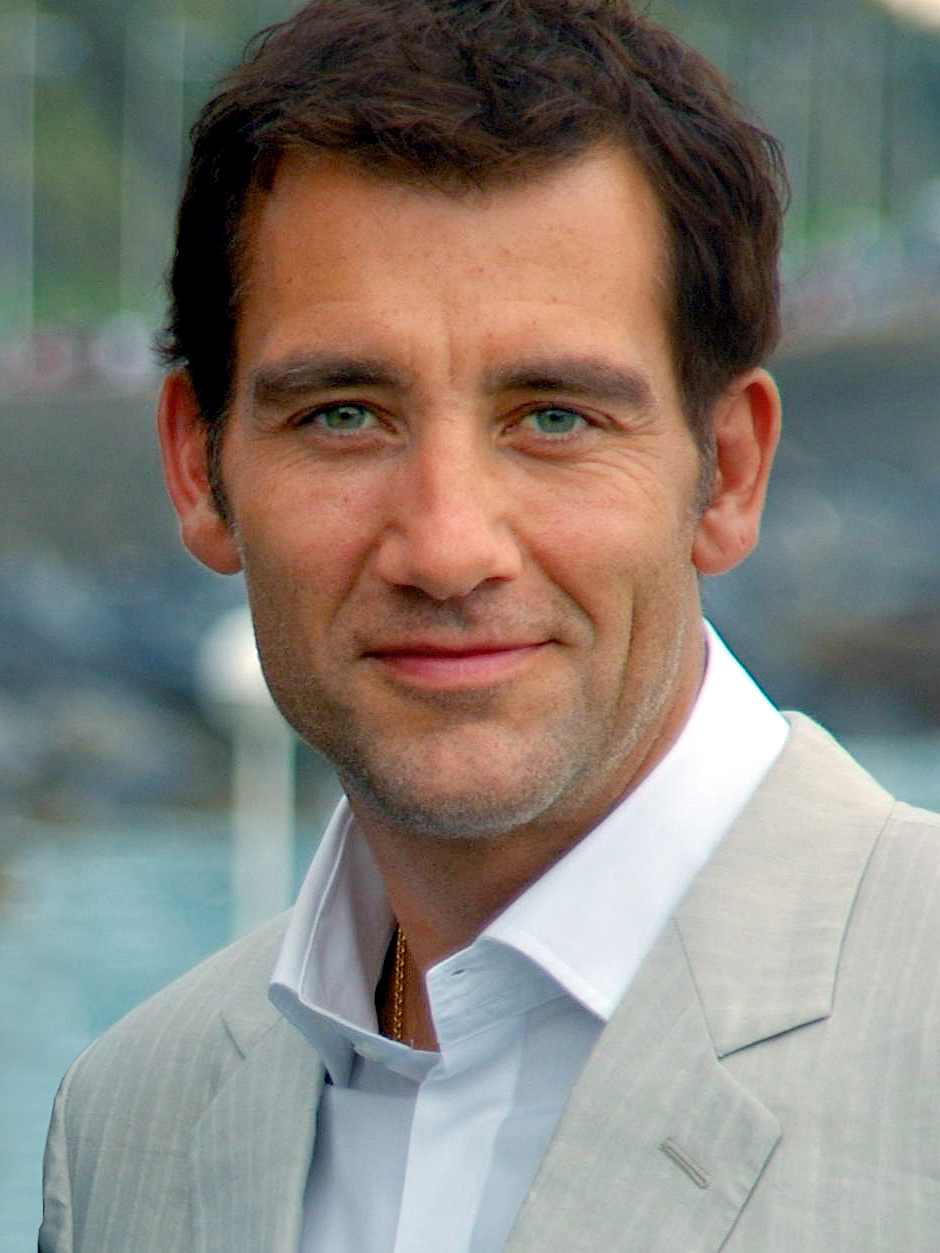
- Owen in September 2006, aged 41
- Born: 3 October 1964 (age 62); Coventry, Warwickshire, England
- Education: Royal Academy of Dramatic Art (BA)
- Occupation: Actor
- Years active: 1987–present
- Spouse: Sarah-Jane Fenton (m. 1995)
- Children: 2

Clive Owen (born 3 October 1964) is an English actor. He first gained recognition in the United Kingdom for playing the lead role in the ITV series Chancer from 1990 to 1991. He received critical acclaim for his work in the film Close My Eyes (1991) before earning international attention for his performance as a struggling writer in Croupier (1998). In 2005, he won a Golden Globe and a BAFTA Award and was nominated for an Academy Award for his performance in the drama Closer (2004).

Owen has played leading roles in films such as Sin City (2005), Derailed (2005), Inside Man (2006), Children of Men (2006), and The International (2009). In 2012, he earned his first Primetime Emmy Award nomination for Outstanding Lead Actor in a Miniseries or a Movie for his role in Hemingway & Gellhorn. He played Dr. John W. Thackery on the Cinemax medical drama series The Knick, for which he received a Golden Globe Award for Best Actor – Television Series Drama nomination. In 2021, Owen starred in the psychological romance horror miniseries Lisey's Story and also portrayed President Bill Clinton in the third season of American Crime Story. He then had further television roles in A Murder at the End of the World (2023) and Monsieur Spade (2024).

== Early life ==
Owen was born in Keresley, Coventry (then in Warwickshire), the fourth of five sons born to Pamela (née Cotton) and Jess Owen. His father, a country and western singer, left the family when Owen was three years old, and despite a brief reconciliation when Owen was 19, they have remained estranged. He has described his childhood as "rough".

While initially opposed to drama school, he changed his mind in 1984, after a long and fruitless period of searching for work. After graduating from the Royal Academy of Dramatic Art, he worked at the Young Vic, performing in several Shakespearean plays.

== Career ==
=== Early career ===
Initially, Owen's career was in television. In 1988, he starred as Gideon Sarn in a BBC production of Precious Bane and the Channel 4 film Vroom before the 1990s saw him become a regular on stage and television in the UK, notably his lead role in the ITV series Chancer, followed by an appearance in the Thames Television production of Lorna Doone.

He won critical acclaim for his performances in the Stephen Poliakoff film Close My Eyes (1991) about a brother and sister who embark on an incestuous love affair. He subsequently appeared in The Magician, Class of '61, Century, Nobody's Children, An Evening with Gary Lineker, Doomsday Gun, Return of the Native and a Carlton production called Sharman, about a private detective. In 1996, he appeared in his first major Hollywood film The Rich Man's Wife alongside Halle Berry, followed by an unforgettable lead performance as Max in Bent in 1997. He then found international acclaim in a Channel 4 film directed by Mike Hodges called Croupier (1998). In Croupier, he played the title role of a struggling writer who takes a job in a London casino as inspiration for his work, only to get caught up in a robbery scheme. In 1999, he appeared as an accident-prone driver in Split Second, his first BBC production in about a decade.

Owen starred in The Echo, a BBC1 drama, before starring in the film Greenfingers, about a criminal who goes to work in a garden. He appeared in the BBC1 mystery series Second Sight. In 2001, he provided the voice-over for Walk On By, a BBC2 documentary about popular music, as well as starring in a highly acclaimed theatre revival of Peter Nichols' play A Day in the Death of Joe Egg, about a couple with a severely disabled daughter.

=== Subsequent work ===
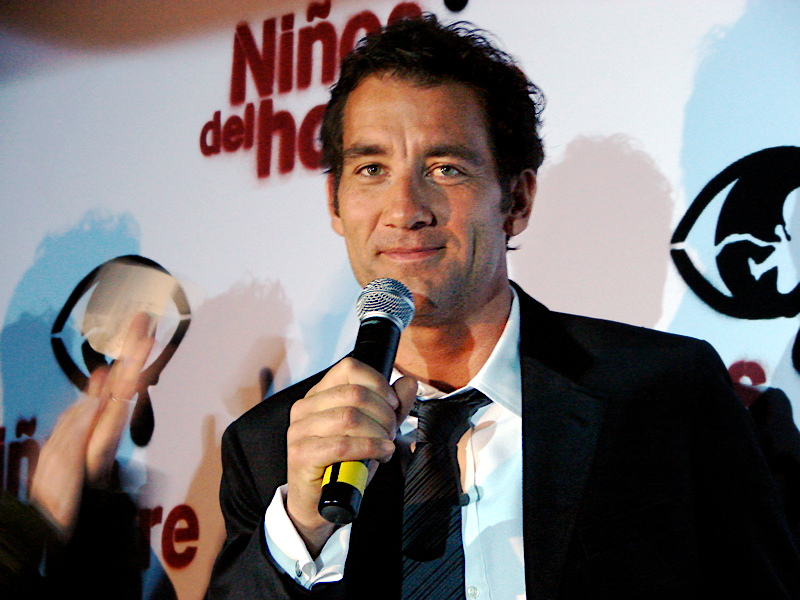
Owen at the Children of Men premiere in Mexico City, 2006

Owen became known to North American audiences in the summer of 2001 after starring as "The Driver" in The Hire, a series of short films sponsored by BMW and made by prominent directors. He appeared in Robert Altman's Gosford Park. He appeared in the 2002 film The Bourne Identity. In 2003, he reteamed with director Mike Hodges in I'll Sleep When I'm Dead. He starred in Beyond Borders as well as King Arthur in King Arthur, for which he learned to ride a horse.

He appeared in the Royal National Theatre debut of the hit play Closer, by Patrick Marber, which was produced as a film in 2004. He played Dan in the play, and played Larry in the film version. His portrayal of Larry in the film received very favourable reviews, as well as the Golden Globe and BAFTA awards, and an Academy Award nomination for Best Supporting Actor. He noted that the expectations of him since the Oscar nomination have not changed the way he approaches film-making, stating "I try, every film I do, to be as good as I can and that's all I can do."

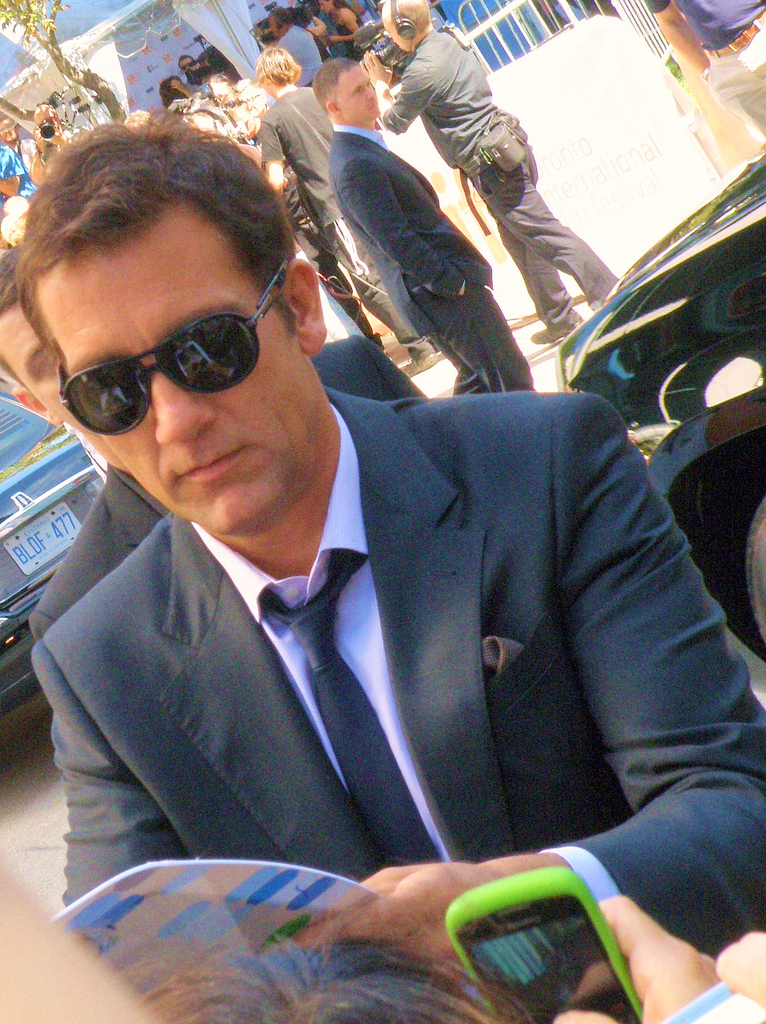
Owen at the 2011 Toronto International Film Festival

After Closer, he appeared in Derailed alongside Jennifer Aniston, the comic book thriller Sin City as the noir antihero Dwight McCarthy and as a mysterious bank robber in Inside Man. Despite public denials, Owen had been rumoured to be a possible successor to Pierce Brosnan in the role of James Bond. A public opinion poll in the United Kingdom in October 2005 by SkyNews found that he was the public's number one choice to star in the next instalment of the series. In that same month, however, it was announced that fellow British actor Daniel Craig would become the next James Bond. In an interview in the September 2007 issue of Details, he claimed that he was not offered or approached concerning the role.

In 2006, Owen spoofed the Bond connection by making an appearance in the remake of The Pink Panther in which he plays a character named "Nigel Boswell, Agent 006" (when he introduces himself to Inspector Clouseau, he quips that Owen's character is "one short of the big time").

In 2006, Owen starred in Children of Men. The film was nominated for various awards, including an Academy Award for Best Adapted Screenplay; Owen worked on the screenplay, although he was uncredited. The next year he starred alongside Paul Giamatti in the film Shoot 'Em Up and appeared as Sir Walter Raleigh opposite Cate Blanchett's Elizabeth I of England in the film Elizabeth: The Golden Age. He appeared in the Christmas special of the Ricky Gervais and Stephen Merchant show Extras.

Owen starred in The International (2009), a film which he described as a "paranoid political thriller". He played the lead in The Boys Are Back, an Australian adaptation of the book The Boys Are Back in Town by Simon Carr.

In June 2010, it was announced that Owen and Nicole Kidman would star in an HBO film about Ernest Hemingway and his relationship with Martha Gellhorn entitled Hemingway & Gellhorn. James Gandolfini served as executive producer to the film, written by Barbara Turner and Jerry Stahl. The film was directed by Philip Kaufman and released in 2012. Owen played the lead in Shadow Dancer, a joint UK/Ireland production about a young mother who is involved with Irish republicanism. It co-starred Andrea Riseborough, Gillian Anderson, and Aidan Gillen, and was directed by James Marsh. In April 2010, he was cast as the lead in Juan Carlos Fresnadillo's horror-thriller Intruders.

Owen starred in the film Blood Ties, directed by Guillaume Canet, alongside French actress Marion Cotillard. It was released in June 2013 at the 2013 Cannes Film Festival. In 2015, Owen made his Broadway debut in a revival of Harold Pinter's Old Times at the American Airlines Theatre. He was selected to be on the jury for the main competition section of the 2016 Berlin Film Festival.

In October 2017, Owen returned to Broadway as Rene Gallimard in a revival of David Henry Hwang's M. Butterfly at the Cort Theatre in New York City.

In 2019, Owen played the role of the defrocked Reverend T. Lawrence Shannon in the West End theatre production of Tennessee Williams' The Night of the Iguana at the Noël Coward Theatre. Also in 2019, he played Dovidl Rapaport in The Song of Names. He played Bill Clinton in the miniseries Impeachment: American Crime Story.

== Personal life ==
Owen met his wife, Sarah-Jane Fenton, in 1988, when they were in a production of Shakespeare's Romeo and Juliet at the Young Vic Theatre in London. They began dating shortly after and married in March 1995. They have two children, Hannah and Eve.

Owen became a patron of the Electric Palace Cinema in Harwich, Essex, and launched an appeal for funds to repair deteriorating elements of the historic building. The cinema is local to his second home at Wrabness.

Owen is a supporter of Premier League club Liverpool and narrated the fly on the wall documentary series Being: Liverpool.

== Filmography ==
=== Film ===
| Year | Title | Role | Notes |
|---|---|---|---|
| 1990 | Vroom | Jake | film debut |
| 1991 | Close My Eyes | Richard | |
| 1993 | Century | Paul Reisner | |
| 1995 | The Turnaround | Nick Sharman | |
| 1996 | The Rich Man's Wife | Jake Golden | |
| 1997 | Bent | Max | |
| 1998 | Croupier | Jack Manfred | |
| 2000 | Greenfingers | Colin Briggs | |
| 2001 | Ambush | The Driver | 1st season of The Hire short film series for BMW |
| 2001 | Chosen | The Driver | 1st season of The Hire short film series for BMW |
| 2001 | The Follow | The Driver | 1st season of The Hire short film series for BMW |
| 2001 | Star | The Driver | 1st season of The Hire short film series for BMW |
| 2001 | Powder Keg | The Driver | 1st season of The Hire short film series for BMW |
| 2001 | Gosford Park | Robert Parks | |
| 2002 | The Bourne Identity | The Professor | |
| 2002 | Hostage | The Driver | 2nd season of The Hire short film series for BMW |
| 2002 | Ticker | The Driver | 2nd season of The Hire short film series for BMW |
| 2002 | Beat the Devil | The Driver | 2nd season of The Hire short film series for BMW |
| 2003 | I'll Sleep When I'm Dead | Will | |
| 2003 | Beyond Borders | Nick Callahan | |
| 2004 | King Arthur | Arthur | |
| 2004 | Closer | Larry Gray | |
| 2005 | Sin City | Dwight McCarthy | |
| 2005 | Derailed | Charles Schine | |
| 2006 | The Pink Panther | Nigel Boswell/Agent 006 | uncredited |
| 2006 | Inside Man | Dalton Russell | |
| 2006 | Children of Men | Theo Faron | |
| 2007 | Shoot 'Em Up | Smith | |
| 2007 | Elizabeth: The Golden Age | Sir Walter Raleigh | |
| 2009 | The International | Louis Salinger | |
| 2009 | Duplicity | Ray Koval | |
| 2009 | The Boys Are Back | Joe Warr | |
| 2010 | Trust | Will | |
| 2011 | Killer Elite | Spike | |
| 2011 | Intruders | John Farrow | |
| 2012 | Shadow Dancer | Mac | |
| 2013 | Blood Ties | Chris | |
| 2013 | Words and Pictures | Jack Marcus | |
| 2015 | Last Knights | Raiden | |
| 2016 | The Confirmation | Walt | |
| 2016 | The Escape | The Driver | 3rd season of The Hire short film series for BMW |
| 2017 | Killer in Red | Floyd | Short film |
| 2017 | Valerian and the City of a Thousand Planets | Commander Arun Filitt | |
| 2018 | Ophelia | Claudius | |
| 2018 | Anon | Sal Frieland | |
| 2019 | Gemini Man | Clay Varris | |
| 2019 | The Song of Names | Dovidl | |
| 2019 | The Informer | Keith Montgomery | |
| 2020 | Romantic Guide to Lost Places | Benno | |
| 2021 | Lui | Jason | Voice |
| 2025 | Cleaner | Marcus Blake | |
| TBA | Kristallnacht | Wilhelm Krützfeld | Filming |

=== Television ===
| Year | Title | Role | Notes |
|---|---|---|---|
| 1987 | Rockliffe's Babies | PC Parslew | Television debut Episode: "Up the Down Escalator" |
| 1988 | Boon | Geoff | Episode: "Peacemaker" |
| 1989 | Precious Bane | Gideon Sarn | Television film |
| 1990 | Lorna Doone | John Ridd | Television film |
| 1990–1991 | Chancer | Derek Love/Stephen Crane | Series regular; 20 episodes |
| 1993 | Class of '61 | Devin O'Neil | Television film |
| 1993 | The Magician | Detective Conservative George Byrne | Television film |
| 1994 | Nobody's Children | Corneliu Bratu | Television film |
| 1994 | An Evening with Gary Lineker | Bill | Television film |
| 1994 | Doomsday Gun | Dov | Television film |
| 1994 | The Return of the Native | Damon Wildeve | Television film |
| 1995–1996 | Screen Two | Paul/Diggory Venn | 2 episodes |
| 1996 | Sharman | Nick Sharman | Series regular; 4 episodes |
| 1998 | The Echo | Deacon | Television miniseries; 2 episodes |
| 1999 | Split Second | Michael Anderson | Television film |
| 1999 | Second Sight | DCI Ross Tanner | Television film |
| 2000 | Second Sight: Parasomnia | DCI Ross Tanner | Television film |
| 2000 | Second Sight: Kingdom of the Blind | DCI Ross Tanner | Television film |
| 2000 | Second Sight: Hide and Seek | DCI Ross Tanner | Television film |
| 2007 | Extras | Himself | Episode: "The Extra Special Series Finale" |
| 2007 | Hypnose homee | Himself | Television short |
| 2012 | Hemingway & Gellhorn | Ernest Hemingway | Television film |
| 2012 | Being: Liverpool | Narrator | Episode: "Silver Shovel" |
| 2014–2015 | The Knick | Dr. John W. Thackery | Series regular; 20 episodes |
| 2020 | Curb Your Enthusiasm | Himself | Episode: "Insufficient Praise" |
| 2021 | Lisey's Story | Scott Landon | Main cast; 8 episodes |
| 2021 | Impeachment: American Crime Story | Bill Clinton | Main cast; 10 episodes |
| 2023 | A Murder at the End of the World | Andy Ronson | Main cast |
| 2024 | Monsieur Spade | Sam Spade | Lead role |

=== Theatre ===
| Year | Title | Role | Director | Venue | Ref. |
|---|---|---|---|---|---|
| 1991 | The Philanderer | Mr Joseph Cuthbertson | Brian Cox | Hampstead Theatre, London | |
| 1991 | The Doctor's Dilemma | Unknown | James Maxwell | Royal Exchange Theatre | |
| 1994 | Design for Living | Alfred Lunt | Sean Mathias | Donmar Warehouse, London | |
| 1997 | Closer | Dan | Patrick Marber | Royal National Theatre, London | |
| 2001 | A Day in the Death of Joe Egg | Bri | Laurence Boswell | New Ambassadors Theatre, London | |
| 2015 | Old Times | Deeley | Douglas Hodge | American Airlines Theatre, Broadway | |
| 2017 | M. Butterfly | Rene Gallimard | Julie Taymor | Cort Theatre, Broadway | |
| 2019 | The Night of the Iguana | Rev. T. Lawrence Shannon | James Macdonald | Noël Coward Theatre, West End | |
| 2025–2026 | End | Alfie | Rachel O'Riordan | Royal National Theatre, London | |

=== Video games ===
| Year | Title | Role | Notes |
|---|---|---|---|
| 1996 | Privateer 2: The Darkening | Lev Arris | Live-action cutscenes |

=== Producer ===
| Year | Title | Notes |
|---|---|---|
| 2009 | The Boys Are Back | Feature film; executive producer |
| 2014–2015 | The Knick | 20 episodes; executive producer |
| 2024 | Monsieur Spade | 6 episodes; executive producer |

=== Soundtracks ===
| Year | Title | Notes | Song |
|---|---|---|---|
| 2012 | Hemingway & Gellhorn | Television film | "Tutti Mi Chiamano Bionda" |

== Awards and nominations ==
Owen has received multiple nominations for his work in both film and television. He has one Academy Award nomination for Best Supporting Actor for his role as Larry in Closer (2004), three Golden Globe Award nominations, winning one in 2005 for Best Supporting Actor in a Motion Picture for his role in Closer; his other two nominations are for his roles in television including made-for-television film Hemingway & Gellhorn (2012) for Best Lead Actor in a Miniseries or Motion Picture Made for Television, and drama series The Knick (2014) for Best Lead Actor in a Television Series – Drama, one Primetime Emmy Award for Outstanding Lead Actor in a Limited Series or Movie nomination for his performance in Hemingway & Gellhorn (2012), and two Screen Actors Guild Award nominations – winning one in 2002 for Outstanding Performance by an Ensemble in a Motion Picture for his performance in Gosford Park (2002).

| Year | Title | Accolade | Results |
|---|---|---|---|
| 2002 | Gosford Park | Critics' Choice Award, Best Acting Ensemble | Won |
| 2002 | Gosford Park | Florida Film Critics Circle Award, Best Ensemble Cast | Won |
| 2002 | Gosford Park | Online Film Critics Society Award, Best Ensemble | Won |
| 2002 | Gosford Park | Phoenix Film Critics Society Award, Best Acting Ensemble | Nominated |
| 2002 | Gosford Park | Satellite Award, Best Ensemble in a Motion Picture | Won |
| 2002 | Gosford Park | Screen Actors Guild Award, Outstanding Performance by an Ensemble in a Motion Picture | Won |
| 2004 | Closer | Boston Society of Film Critics Award, Best Supporting Actor | Nominated |
| 2004 | Closer | Golden Schmoes Award, Best Supporting Actor of the Year | Nominated |
| 2004 | Closer | National Board of Review Award, Best Acting by an Ensemble | Won |
| 2004 | Closer | New York Film Critics Circle Award, Best Supporting Actor | Won |
| 2004 | Closer | Seattle Film Critics Award, Best Supporting Actor | Nominated |
| 2004 | Closer | Toronto Film Critics Association Award, Best Supporting Actor | Won |
| 2005 | Closer | Academy Award, Best Supporting Actor | Nominated |
| 2005 | Closer | British Academy Film Award, Best Supporting Actor | Won |
| 2005 | Closer | Central Ohio Film Critics Association Award, Best Supporting Actor | Nominated |
| 2005 | Closer | Critics' Choice Award, Best Supporting Actor | Nominated |
| 2005 | Closer | Critics' Choice Award, Best Acting Ensemble | Nominated |
| 2005 | Closer | Dallas-Fort Worth Film Critics Association Award, Best Supporting Actor | Nominated |
| 2005 | Closer | Golden Globe Award, Best Supporting Actor in a Motion Picture | Won |
| 2005 | Closer | International Cinephile Society Award, Best Supporting Actor | Won |
| 2005 | Closer | Italian Online Movie Award, Best Supporting Actor | Nominated |
| 2005 | Closer | Las Vegas Film Critics Society Award, Best Supporting Actor | Won |
| 2005 | Closer | London Critics' Circle Film Award, British Actor of the Year | Nominated |
| 2005 | Closer | Online Film & Television Association Award, Best Supporting Actor | Won |
| 2005 | Closer | Online Film Critics Society Award, Best Supporting Actor | Nominated |
| 2005 | Closer | Satellite Award, Best Supporting Actor in a Motion Picture – Drama | Nominated |
| 2005 | Closer | Vancouver Film Critics Circle Award, Best Supporting Actor | Nominated |
| 2006 | Sin City | Critics' Choice Award, Best Acting Ensemble | Nominated |
| 2006 | Children of Men | Golden Schmoes Award, Best Actor of the Year | Nominated |
| 2006 | Sin City | MTV Movie + TV Award, Best Kiss (shared with Rosario Dawson) | Nominated |
| 2007 | Inside Man; Children of Men | Central Ohio Film Critics Association Award, Actor of the Year | Won |
| 2007 | Children of Men | Italian Online Movie Award, Best Lead Actor | Nominated |
| 2007 | Children of Men | Russian National Movie Award, Best Foreign Actor of the Year | Nominated |
| 2007 | Shoot 'Em Up | Satellite Award, Best Lead Actor in a Motion Picture – Comedy or Musical | Nominated |
| 2007 | Children of Men | Saturn Award, Best Lead Actor | Nominated |
| 2008 | Elizabeth: The Golden Age | Russian National Movie Award, Best Foreign Actor of the Year | Nominated |
| 2010 | The Boys Are Back | Australian Film Institute Award, Best Lead Actor | Nominated |
| 2012 | Hemingway & Gellhorn | Primetime Emmy Award, Outstanding Lead Actor in a Miniseries or a Movie | Nominated |
| 2012 | Hemingway & Gellhorn | Satellite Award, Best Lead Actor in a Miniseries or a Motion Picture Made for Television | Nominated |
| 2013 | —N/a | Golden Camera Award, Best International Actor | Won |
| 2013 | Hemingway & Gellhorn | Golden Globe Award, Best Lead Actor in a Miniseries or Motion Picture Made for Television | Nominated |
| 2013 | Hemingway & Gellhorn | Screen Actors Guild Award, Outstanding Performance by a Male Actor in a Television Movie or Miniseries | Nominated |
| 2014 | The Knick | IGN Summer Movie Award, Best Television Actor | Nominated |
| 2014 | —N/a | Russian National Movie Award, Best Foreign Actor of the Decade | Nominated |
| 2014 | The Knick | Satellite Award, Best Lead Actor in a Series – Drama | Won |
| 2015 | The Knick | Golden Globe Award, Best Lead Actor in a Television Series – Drama | Nominated |
| 2016 | The Knick | Critics' Choice Television Award, Best Lead Actor in a Drama Series | Nominated |
| 2016 | The Knick | Online Film & Television Association Award, Best Lead Actor in a Drama Series | Nominated |
| 2022 | Impeachment: American Crime Story | Satellite Award for Best Actor in a Miniseries or Television Film | Nominated |
