= Catholic Central High School (Windsor, Ontario) =

Location
- 2465 McDougall St. Windsor, Ontario, N8X 3N9; Canada; 42.29008°N 83.01676°W

Information
- School type: Catholic High school
- Motto: Expectat Me In Aliis Christus (Christ waits for me in others)
- Founded: 1985
- School board: Windsor-Essex Catholic District School Board
- Superintendent: Joumana Tawil
- Area trustee: Bernie Mastromattei
- Principal: Melissa Cavallin
- Grades: 9–12
- Language: English
- Schedule: 8:15 A.M. – 2:15 P.M.
- Team name: Comets
- Feeder schools: Immaculate Conception, St. Angela, Our Lady of Perpetual Help
- Website: Catholic Central High School

Catholic Central High School is a high school in Windsor, Ontario, Canada. It is operated by the Windsor-Essex Catholic District School Board (WECDSB). Melissa Cavallin is the school's current principal.

== History ==
In 1985 or 1986, the Windsor Catholic School Board voted to open a fourth Catholic high school in the city. In January 1986, the school board named Ed Johnston the principal, and he served in this role until 1988. During the school's first year of operation, in 1986–1987, classes were held in the vacated St. Hubert's School in South Windsor. During this first year, Catholic Central had 16 teachers.

In August 1987, negotiations with the Windsor Public School Board were completed and the school location moved from St. Hubert's. The new location had previously been a grade school, a commercial high school, and an Adult Education Center.

During the 1987–1988 school year, there were 36 staff and 470 students in Grades 9 and 10. In the 1990–1991 school year, there were 1074 students and 75 teachers.

In 1992, the school began renovations and the construction of an addition for $4.6 million. The grand opening was held on November 19, 1993.

=== New Building and Location ===
In November 2016, the Ontario Minister of Education confirmed that the Windsor-Essex Catholic District School Board would receive approximately $26 million in funding to build a new school to replace the aging Catholic Central High School on Tecumseh Road East.

Initially, the plan was to build the school on a five-acre site in Windsor's downtown core, where the former Windsor Arena stood. However, after further evaluation, the WECDSB decided to purchase an 11-acre property between Ouellette and McDougall Avenue to speed up the construction process. The Ministry of Education funded this new site purchase in June 2019. This new location is less than a kilometer south of the former school. Construction began in 2021.

Due to the COVID-19 pandemic, illnesses and supply chain shortages delayed the progress of construction on the building, pushing the opening of the new building multiple times from its estimated September 2022 opening date.

On January 9, 2023, the new $30 million Catholic Central High School building opened to staff. Students began attending classes on January 10, 2023.

=== Boys Basketball ===
The boys basketball teams have won three Ontario Federation of School Athletic Associations (OFSAA) championships (2006, 2013, 2015), two OFSAA silver medals (2007, 2014) and two OFSAA bronze medals (1997, 1998), as well as 35 WECSSAA and SWOSSAA championships.

Individually, 27 times Catholic Central players have been selected to the 1st team All City and 6 times as WECSSAA MVPs. At the Junior and Freshman levels, 12 times Catholic Central players were selected as WECSSAA MVPs.

== Notable alumni ==
- James Bondy - Professional actor and star of the PBS show Ribert & Roberts Wonderland of Boston, Mass.
- Tyrone Crawford - Arcanum Award recipient. Defensive End for Boise State. Junior College All American (2009). Named Breakout Player for 2011 by ESPN. Drafted in the 3rd round, 81st overall in the 2012 NFL draft to the Dallas Cowboys (2012). Led Catholic Central to OFSAA gold medal in basketball in 2006 and silver in 2007. Named league MVP in basketball in 2007. OFSAA champion in Shot Put in 2004 and 2008.
- Brendan Dunlop - sportscaster and host of Fox Soccer News / Soccer Central for Sportsnet
- Samir El-Mais - 2014 Canadian Heavy Weight Boxing Champion and Commonwealth Games Gold Medalist also Heavy Weight Boxing Bronze Medalist at 2015 Pan Am Games
- Miah-Marie Langlois - Olympian, professional basketball player and women's national team member. Led University of Windsor to 4 consecutive national championship.
- Matt Martin - Plays in the NHL for the Toronto Maple Leafs and previously the New York Islanders
- Mychal Mulder - Professional basketball player for the Orlando Magic
- Daryl Townsend - Professional football player with CFL, Montreal Alouettes

== See also ==
- Education in Ontario
- List of secondary schools in Ontario
