= Brendan Dunlop =

Sports TV anchor

Brendan Dunlop is a Canadian sportscaster and author known for his anchoring and hosting duties on The Score, FOX Soccer and Sportsnet television networks.

Dunlop was born and raised in Windsor, Ontario, where he graduated from Catholic Central High School. Dunlop grew up a sports fan and had aspirations of becoming a sports journalist from watching Ray Romano's character on Everybody Loves Raymond. Dunlop graduated from the University of Guelph-Humber. He originally wanted to be an actor.

Dunlop first gained attention co-hosting The Footy Show on The Score. He was a co-host on The Hardcore Footy Show when this show was broadcast on Hardcore Sports Radio, Sirius XM Radio channel 98, alongside English sportscasters Kristian Jack and James Sharman. He was cohost of the Fox Soccer News, on the now-defunct Canadian channel Fox Sports World Canada. Dunlop also hosted Soccer Central on Sportsnet. He co-anchored the Sportsnet Central program's weekend edition.

In 2020, Dunlop joined the OneSoccer on-air team, providing play-by-play commentary and hosted magazine shows during their coverage of the Canadian Premier League's 2020 season.

Dunlop co-authored MLS icon and former Canadian men's national team captain Dwayne De Rosario's 2021 autobiography DeRo: My Life, released in May 2021.

On July 10, 2023, Brendan made his TSN debut, filling in for hosting duties on the primetime radio show, Overdrive. He is a fill-in radio show host on TSN 1050 Toronto and in 2024 hosted MLS on TSN broadcasts during Vancouver Whitecaps matches.
