= CRN Digital Talk Radio Networks =

American radio programming distributor

CRN Digital Talk Radio Network
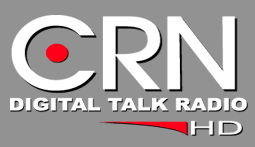
- Broadcast area: Worldwide via Internet
- Headquarters: Chatsworth, Los Angeles

Ownership
- Key people: Jennifer Horn, VP of Sales & Marketing

History
- Founded: 1983; 43 years ago by Michael Horn, CEO
- Former names: Cable Radio Network, CRN Talk

Links
- Webcast: CRN1; CRN2; CRN3; CRN4; CRN5; CRN6; CRN7; CRN8
- Website: crntalk.com

CRN Digital Talk Radio Networks, sometimes simply referred to as CRN or CRN Digital Talk, is a syndicator and distributor of radio programs and talk radio networks.

== History ==
CRN was founded in 1983 as Cable Radio Network to provide commercial radio programming to local cable television systems. CRN founder Michael Horn (who, at the time, was an on-air personality at Los Angeles’ KFI AM) read an article in the trade publication Radio & Records that mentioned Los Angeles radio station KMET earned ratings points in the Phoenix market. Horn learned KMET was the audio source for a channel on a local cable system in Phoenix.

Horn brought the radio-on-television idea to San Fernando Valley cable provider King Cable, where he soon programmed a country music channel. Seeking a more mass appeal, Horn changed the channel's format to oldies music. Two other cable systems – Valley Cable and Falcon Cable – then became interested and CRN was then used on a few Electronic Program Guides across America.

Broadcast hookups were initially conducted through phone lines before the method became cost prohibitive. Horn invested more money and switched to satellite transmission. A branding change from "Cable Radio Network" to "CRN Networks" eventually followed.

Noncommercial music channels from companies such as Digital Planet and DMX eventually were picked up by cable providers. Instead of competing with them, Horn switched CRN's programming to a talk radio platform. CRN Networks then became "CRN Talk" and, in 2007, "CRN Digital Talk Radio". The company's legal name remains Cable Radio Networks, Inc.

Horn commissioned a company that worked with Arbitron (now Nielsen Audio) to determine CRN's listenership. Results indicated that CRN shared a similar-size audience as MSNBC, Cinemax, and Fox Sports.

In 2013, CRN Digital Talk Radio Launched CRN Digital Magazine, its own online magazine (no association with CRN Magazine) featuring lifestyle and entertainment stories written by CRN personalities.

== Programming ==
CRN programs are produced both in house and in collaboration with other broadcasters. CRN broadcasts eight audio feeds: a main feed that carries mostly in-house offerings; direct network feeds from Sports Byline USA, The Answer, Compass Media Networks and others. CRN also airs a simulcast of XEAAA-AM (a female-oriented Spanish-language station based in Guadalajara, Mexico); and a seventh channel that duplicates and timeshifts some of the other feeds' programs. It is distributed, as its former name implies, mostly through various cable television providers, much in the way the more widely available Music Choice is distributed. However, it is also available via C band satellite, various terrestrial stations across the nation and on the Internet.

Some of CRN’s first talk offerings included “Polka Parade” with Dick Sinclair and television and radio personality George Putnam’s “Talk Back” (which became a CRN exclusive). Former Tonight Show Starring Johnny Carson co-host Ed McMahon also hosted his weekly Lifestyles Live program on CRN.

Don Ecker’s “UFOs Tonight”, and the pro wrestling themed “Squared Circle” hosted by James "Shadowe" Boone were also CRN original programs.

CRN Digital Talk Radio announced in June 2015 it would become the home for libertarian radio and television personality Larry Elder’s show. Less than two months later, Salem Radio Network announced it would add Elder’s program to its own national syndication lineup.

Actor Robert Conrad hosted his own CRN program until his death on February 8, 2020, and Barry Farber hosted his own show until his death later that year. There are also several food and wine lifestyle programs, such as the "What's Cookin'" franchise.
