= Nobody's Children (1994 film) =

- Genre: Drama
- Written by: Petru Popescu; Iris Friedman
- Directed by: David Wheatley
- Starring: Ann-Margret; Dominique Sanda; Jay O. Sanders
- Theme music composer: Jean-Claude Petit
- Country of origin: United States
- Original language: English

Production
- Executive producers: Tarak Ben Ammar; Ann Daniel; Peby Guisez; Henry Winkler
- Producers: Georges Dybman; Jeffrey White
- Production location: Romania
- Cinematography: Franco Di Giacomo
- Editor: John Grover
- Running time: 95 minutes
- Production company: Filmex Romania

Original release
- Release: 1994

Nobody's Children is a 1994 American TV film directed by David Wheatley. The film was written by Petru Popescu and Iris Friedman for USA Pictures. The film concerns an American couple's battle through bureaucracy to adopt a Romanian child.

== Cast ==
- Ann-Margret as Carol Stevens
- Dominique Sanda as Stephanie Vaugier
- Jay O. Sanders as Joe Stevens
- Reiner Schöne as Sorin Dornescu
- Clive Owen as Corneliu Bratu
- Allan Corduner as Ion
- Katrin Cartlidge as Viorica
- Leon Lissek as Dr. Preda
- Frances Tomelty as Mme. Beziel
- Valentin Teodosiu as Dragan
