= Mychal Mulder =

Canadian basketball player (born 1994)

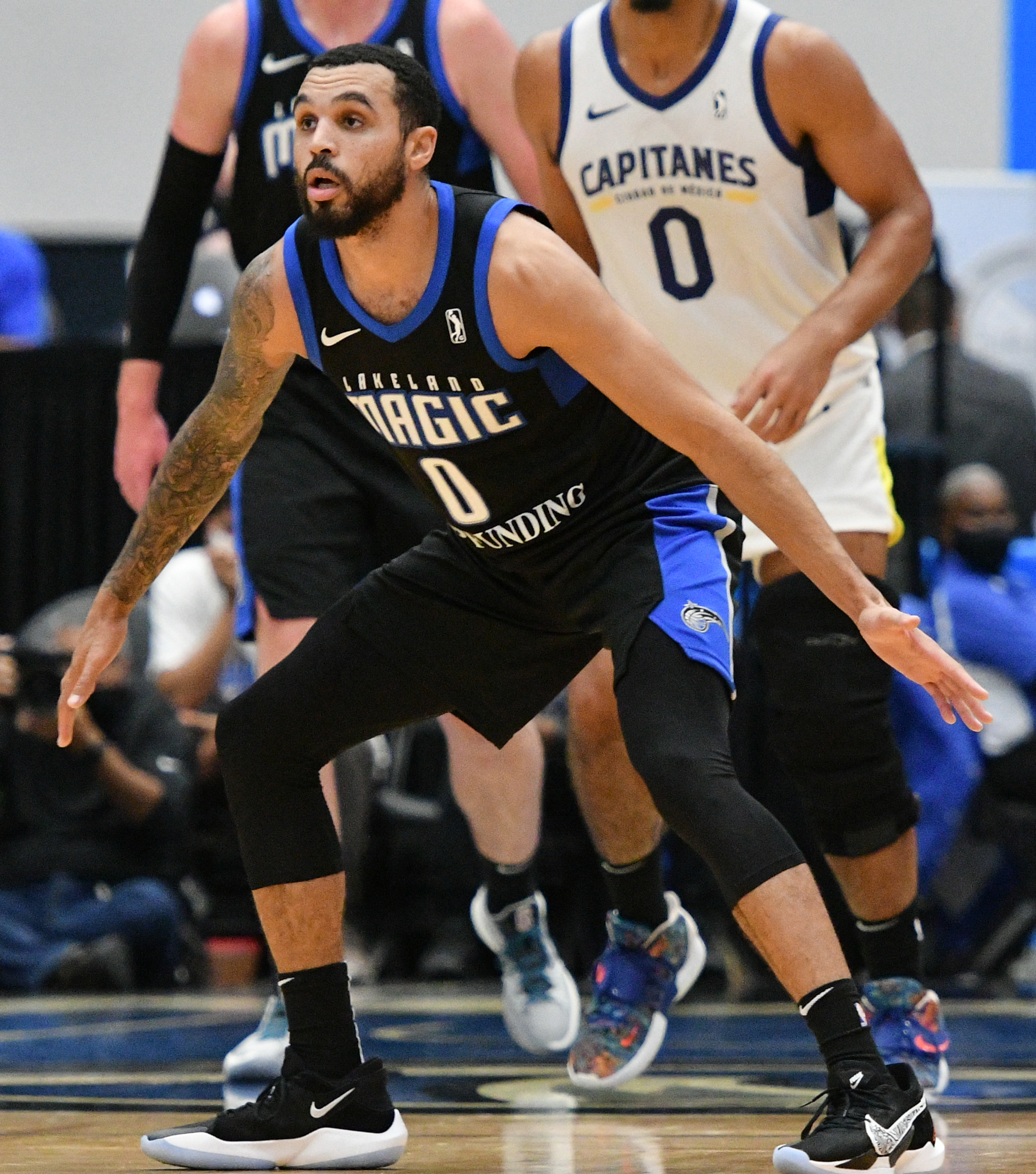
- Mulder with the Lakeland Magic in 2021

No. 11 – Vancouver Bandits
- Position: Shooting guard
- League: Canadian Elite Basketball League

Personal information
- Born: June 12, 1994 (age 32) Windsor, Ontario, Canada
- Listed height: 6 ft 3 in (1.91 m)
- Listed weight: 184 lb (83 kg)

Career information
- High school: Catholic Central (Windsor, Ontario)
- College: Vincennes (2013–2015); Kentucky (2015–2017)
- NBA draft: 2017: undrafted
- Playing career: 2017–present

Career history
- 2017–2019: Windy City Bulls
- 2019–2020: Sioux Falls Skyforce
- 2020–2021: Golden State Warriors
- 2021–2022: Orlando Magic
- 2021: →Lakeland Magic
- 2022: Miami Heat
- 2022: →Sioux Falls Skyforce
- 2022–2023: Sioux Falls Skyforce
- 2023: Memphis Hustle
- 2023–2024: Capital City Go-Go
- 2026–present: Vancouver Bandits
- Stats at NBA.com
- Stats at Basketball Reference

Mychal Mulder (born June 14, 1994) is a Canadian professional basketball player for the Vancouver Bandits of the Canadian Elite Basketball League (CEBL). He played college basketball for the Vincennes Trailblazers and the Kentucky Wildcats.

== Early life ==
Mulder is the son of Jennifer Gignac and Randy Mulder. His mother was an Executive Assistant at the local Utilities company and his father worked at General Motors before being forced to retire after a leg injury. Mulder was named after former NBA player Mychal Thompson, the father of Mulder's future Golden State teammate Klay Thompson. Mulder was raised in Windsor, Ontario, alongside an elder sister, Cynthia. He played basketball at Catholic Central High School, where he was coached by Pete Cusumano. Mulder was considered a Top 10 Canadian prospect in 2013.

== College career ==
Mulder received a single NCAA Division I scholarship offer, to play for the Detroit Mercy Titans men's basketball team. Mulder opted to begin his college basketball career at Vincennes University. As a sophomore, he averaged 15.7 points and 6.4 rebounds per game, shooting 46.3 percent from behind the arc. He led the team to a 33–2 record, was named a JUCO All-American and was rated the 13th-best junior-college prospect by 247Sports.

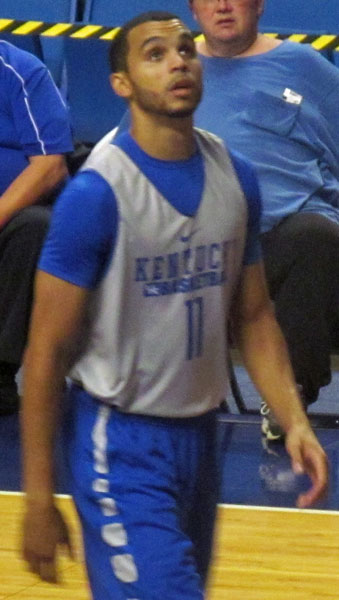
Mulder playing for Kentucky

He then transferred to play for the Kentucky Wildcats men's basketball team. He chose Kentucky over several other colleges, including Creighton, Indiana, and Wichita State. As a senior at Kentucky, Mulder made two starts and averaged 4.7 points and 1.5 rebounds in 10.6 minutes per game, shooting 40.3% from the field and a team-high 92.3% from the free throw line.

== Professional career ==
=== Windy City Bulls (2017–2019) ===
Mulder went undrafted in the 2017 NBA draft. He was later selected ninth overall in the 2017 NBA G League draft by the Windy City Bulls. In his second season with the Bulls, Mulder posted 13.7 points, 4.1 rebounds, 1.6 assists in 32.9 minutes per game. In May 2019, Mulder was invited to the NBA G League Elite Camp.

=== Sioux Falls Skyforce (2019–2020) ===
Mulder signed with the Miami Heat on September 17, 2019. The team waived Mulder on October 15, 2019. He began the season with the Sioux Falls Skyforce.

=== Golden State Warriors (2020–2021) ===
On February 27, 2020, the Golden State Warriors announced that they had signed Mulder to a 10-day contract. He made his debut against the Los Angeles Lakers that same day. Mulder had two points and four rebounds in that game, which was a 116–86 loss.

On March 1, 2020, Mulder had a career-high 17 points, along with two rebounds, one assist, one block and one steal in just his third game with the Warriors, a 124–110 loss against the Washington Wizards. On March 7, he started against the Philadelphia 76ers - setting a new career-high 18 points and 3 assists during his last game of his first 10-day contract, a 118–114 win. On March 10, after his 10-day contract expired, the Warriors signed him to a multi-year contract.

On April 28, 2021, Mulder had a career-high 26 points and five rebounds in a 133–103 loss against the Dallas Mavericks. On May 6, 2021, Mulder had 25 points in 20 minutes in a 118–97 win against the Oklahoma City Thunder. On May 14, 2021, Mulder started for the Warriors and had a new career-high of 28 points in a 125–122 win against the New Orleans Pelicans.

Mulder was waived near the end of training camp before the 2021–22 season.

=== Orlando Magic (2021–2022) ===
On October 26, 2021, the Orlando Magic signed Mulder to a two-way contract. On January 6, 2022, he was waived.

=== Return to Sioux Falls (2022) ===
On March 3, 2022, Mulder signed with the Sioux Falls Skyforce.

=== Miami Heat (2022) ===
On March 24, 2022, Mulder signed a two-way contract with the Miami Heat. On July 16, he was waived. On October 9, 2022, Mulder was re-signed by the Heat.

=== Third stint with Skyforce (2022–2023) ===
On October 24, 2022, Mulder rejoined the Sioux Falls Skyforce roster for training camp.

=== Memphis Hustle (2023) ===
On September 1, 2023, Mulder's rights were traded to the Memphis Hustle and on September 30, he signed with the Memphis Grizzlies. However, he was waived on October 16 and on October 30, he joined the Hustle.

=== Capital City Go-Go (2024) ===
On December 27, 2023, Mulder was traded to the Capital City Go-Go in exchange for DeJon Jarreau.

=== Vancouver Bandits (2026–present) ===
On March 26, 2026, Mulder signed with the Vancouver Bandits of the Canadian Elite Basketball League (CEBL) for the 2026 season.

== Career statistics ==
Legend
| GP | Games played | GS | Games started | MPG | Minutes per game |
| FG% | Field goal percentage | 3P% | 3-point field goal percentage | FT% | Free throw percentage |
| RPG | Rebounds per game | APG | Assists per game | SPG | Steals per game |
| BPG | Blocks per game | PPG | Points per game | **Bold** | Career high |

=== NBA ===
==== Regular season ====
| Year | Team | GP | GS | MPG | FG% | 3P% | FT% | RPG | APG | SPG | BPG | PPG |
|---|---|---|---|---|---|---|---|---|---|---|---|---|
| 2019–20 | Golden State | 7 | 3 | **29.1** | .388 | .308 | .750 | **3.3** | **1.1** | **.3** | .1 | **11.0** |
| 2020–21 | Golden State | **60** | **6** | 12.8 | **.449** | .397 | .636 | 1.0 | .4 | .2 | .2 | 5.6 |
| 2021–22 | Orlando | 15 | 2 | 13.0 | .299 | .283 | **1.000** | 1.4 | .2 | **.3** | .1 | 3.7 |
| 2021–22 | Miami | 2 | 1 | 22.0 | .400 | **.500** | **1.000** | 1.5 | 1.0 | .0 | **.5** | 7.0 |
| Career | | 84 | 12 | 14.4 | .413 | .369 | .711 | 1.3 | .5 | .2 | .2 | 5.8 |
