= James Sharman =

British sportscaster

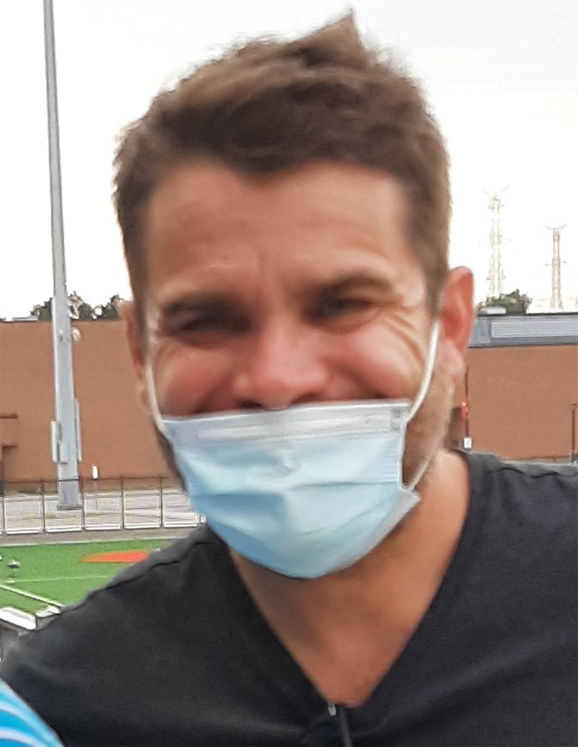
- Sharman in 2021
- Born: April 13, 1974 (age 52); Sevenoaks, England
- Occupation: Sportscaster

James Sharman (born April 13, 1974) is an English writer and sportscaster at Homestand Sports focusing on soccer. He is also co-founder and host at Footy Prime the Podcast. James also frequently appears on Rogers Sportsnet and Sportsnet theFan 590. In 2019, he launched Sharman's Proper Pies with his wife, Toni.

== Biography ==
Born in Sevenoaks, England, he started working for The Score in 1997.

He was the host of The Footy Show on The Score and he was a co-host on The Hardcore Footy Show when this show was broadcast on Hardcore Sports Radio, Sirius XM Radio channel 98, alongside fellow Englishman Kristian Jack and sportscaster Brendan Dunlop.

With the 2006 introduction of Toronto FC into Major League Soccer, Sharman has also done play-by-play for some games. As of 2016, Sharman has served as colour analyst on the radio broadcast of matches on Sportsnet 590 The Fan.

After the Score was purchased by Sportsnet in 2012 and re-branded as Sportsnet 360, Sharman became one of the regular co-hosts of Soccer Central. He often appears on Sportsnet's Premier League coverage in Canada alongside broadcasters such as Danny Dichio and Craig Forrest.

During an interview with TheScore.com, Sharman stated that his interests include soccer, rugby, travelling, and cooking. His favourite soccer club is Liverpool.

Sharman joined OneSoccer in 2020 as the host of "OneNation", a magazine show covering soccer from around the world; he is often joined by Forrest, Dichio, Terry Dunfield, and other Canadian internationals as analysts.
