= Being: Liverpool =

2012 documentary television series

- Created by: Fox Soccer / Channel 5
- Starring: Liverpool Football Club
- Narrated by: Clive Owen
- Country of origin: United States / United Kingdom
- Original language: English
- No. of episodes: 6

Production
- Executive producer: Scott Boggins
- Running time: 60 minutes

Original release
- Network: Fox Soccer (US); Sportsnet (CA); Channel 5 (UK)
- Release: 16 September – 26 October 2012

Being: Liverpool is a 2012 fly on the wall documentary television series about Liverpool Football Club broadcast on Fox Soccer in the United States, Sportsnet in Canada, and Channel 5 in the United Kingdom. It follows the team behind the scenes on their pre season in North America in July 2012 and the buildup to their 2012–13 season in the Premier League.

The documentary was narrated by actor Clive Owen, who is a lifelong Liverpool fan.

== Reception ==
Former Liverpool player Mark Lawrenson criticised the programme claiming that Anfield bosses of old would be "turning in their graves". The programme however was received well by a number of fans who believed it was a good way to give Liverpool some good press. The coverage of the Liverpool vs Roma game in Boston gave fans more of an insight into what went on when staff and players alike prepare on a pre-season tour.

== Episodes ==
No.	Title	Original release date
1	"Silver Shovel"	16 September 2012 (UK)
2	"On the Road"	23 September 2012 (UK)
3	"Anfield Calling"	30 September 2012 (UK)
4	"To Bleed Red"	7 October 2012 (UK)
5	"Walk On"	21 October 2012 (UK)
6	"Red Crusade"	26 October 2012 (UK)
