= Eric Wynalda =

American soccer player (born 1969)

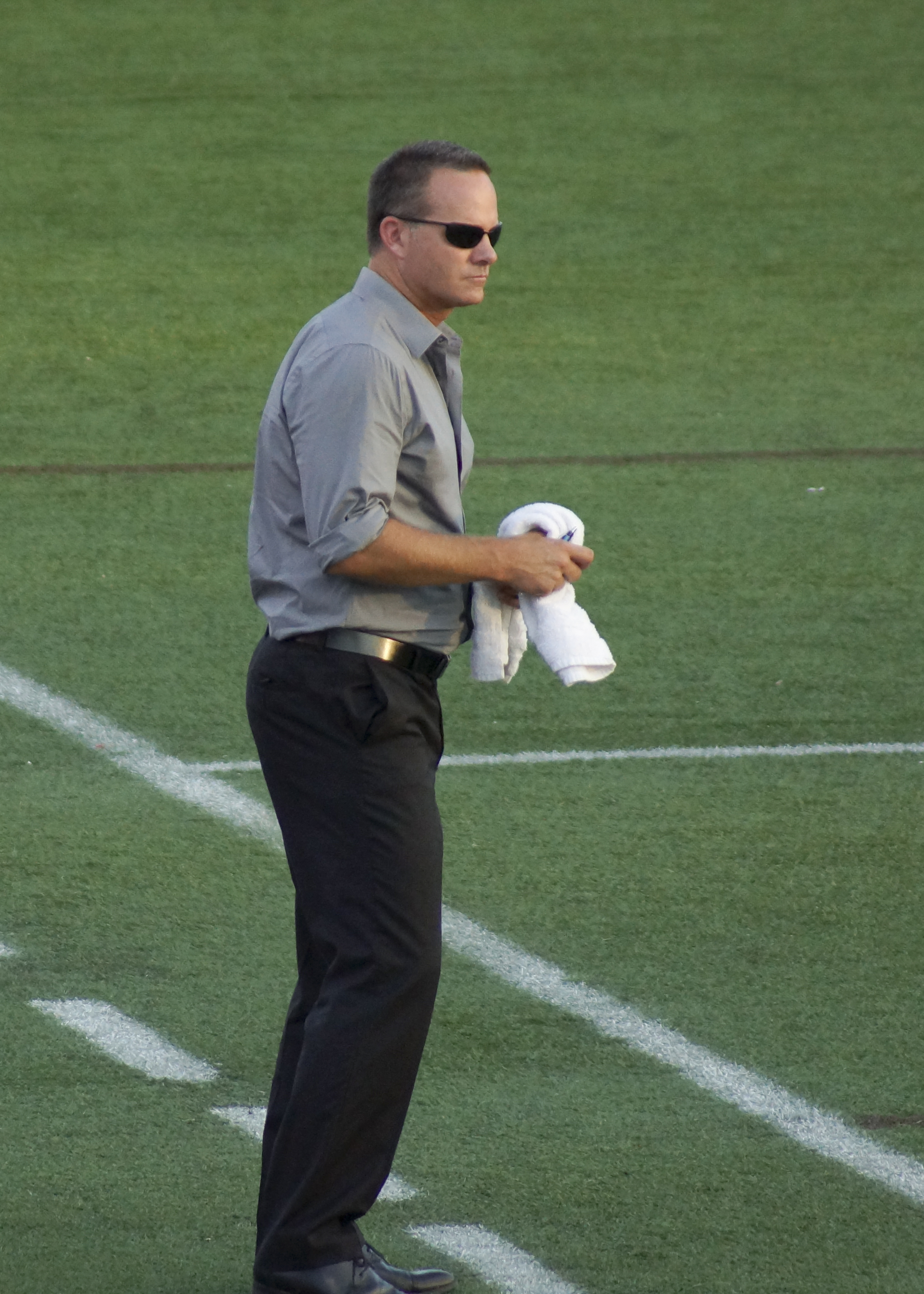
- Wynalda while coaching for Atlanta Silverbacks in 2012

Personal information
- Full name: Eric Boswell Wynalda
- Date of birth: June 9, 1969 (age 57)
- Place of birth: Fullerton, California, US
- Height: 5 ft 10 1/2 in (1.79 m)
- Position: Forward

College career
Years	Team	Apps	(Gls)
1987–1989	San Diego State Aztecs		(34)

Senior career*
Years	Team	Apps	(Gls)
1988–1992	San Diego Nomads	6	(0)
1990–1992	→ San Francisco Bay Blackhawks (loan)	48	(17)
1992–1994	1. FC Saarbrücken	61	(23)
1994–1996	VfL Bochum	29	(2)
1996–1999	San Jose Clash	57	(21)
1999	→ León (loan)	5	(0)
1999–2000	Miami Fusion	12	(3)
2000–2001	New England Revolution	8	(0)
2001	Chicago Fire	21	(10)
2002	Charleston Battery	0	(0)
2007–2008	Bakersfield Brigade	4	(0)
Total		251	(77)

International career
1990–2000	United States	106	(34)

Managerial career
- 2010–2011: San Diego Flash (assistant)
- 2012: Cal FC
- 2012: Atlanta Silverbacks (interim)
- 2014: Atlanta Silverbacks
- 2017: L.A. Wolves
- 2018–2020: Las Vegas Lights
- 2020: New Amsterdam
- 2026–: Nõmme United
Medal record
Representing United States
Men's soccer
FIFA Confederations Cup
Third place	1992 Saudi Arabia
CONCACAF Gold Cup
Winner	1991 United States
Runner-up	1993 Mexico–United States
Third place	1996 United States
Runner-up	1998 United States
- * Club domestic league appearances and goals

Eric Boswell Wynalda (born June 9, 1969) is an American professional soccer coach for FC Nõmme United in Meistriliiga. He is also a former television commentator, and player. He was formerly an analyst and color commentator for soccer coverage on Fox Sports 1 and ESPN. Previously, he served as head coach and technical director of Las Vegas Lights FC in the USL Championship and he is the host of WTF: Wynalda Talks Football on SiriusXM FC.

Wynalda was one of the first Americans to play professionally in Europe before returning to his home country in 1996 to play in Major League Soccer and scoring the first goal in the league's history. Until 2008, he was the all-time leading goal scorer for the United States national team. Wynalda was described as a "shifty, dynamic player off the dribble with a heavy shot." He was also known for his fiery play, and earned the nickname, "Eric the Red Card." He was elected to the National Soccer Hall of Fame in 2004.

== Youth and college ==
Wynalda, of Dutch ancestry, grew up in Westlake Village, California. As a child his team the Westlake Wolves, with Eric's father Dave as the head coach, won the state championship in AYSO soccer. That year Wynalda scored more goals than the entire division his team played in combined (58 goals in 16 games). His skills continued to improve year after year and he attended Westlake High School and was a three time All State selection with the school's boys soccer team and a youth club teammate of fellow national team player Cobi Jones.

Wynalda attended San Diego State University from 1987 to 1989 where he played for the Aztecs men's soccer team, scoring 34 goals and assisting on 25 others during his three seasons. His freshman year, SDSU went to the NCAA Men's Soccer Championship game where it lost to the Bruce Murray-led Clemson Tigers. While at SDSU, he also played two seasons with the local semi-pro San Diego Nomads of the Western Soccer Alliance. In 1988, he played a single game and in 1989, he played five games with the Nomads.

== Club career ==
Leading up to the 1990 FIFA World Cup, Wynalda signed a contract with the U.S. Soccer Federation (USSF). After the World Cup, Wynalda signed as an on loan player from USSF with the San Francisco Bay Blackhawks of the American Professional Soccer League. During his nearly three seasons with the Blackhawks, he played only a handful of games with the team, devoting most of his time to the national team.

In August 1992, USSF loaned Wynalda to Bundesliga club 1. FC Saarbrücken for $45,000. When he arrived at Saarbrücken, he became the first American-born player to play for a top level German club. He had an immediate impact, scoring eight goals in the first half of the season where he played all 17 matches. This led Saarbrücken to purchase Wynalda's contract from USSF for $405,000. In the second half of the season he added one more goal in 15 matches to that tally. By the end of the season Saarbrücken was last in the league and became relegated. Wynalda scored 14 goals and had 25 assists in the 1993–94 season of the 2. Bundesliga. After the end of the season he was transferred for $850,000 to second division winners VfL Bochum which as such were promoted to the Bundesliga. There Wynalda remained without goal in his 22 matches of the 1994–95 season and Bochum was relegated. A hernia operation on August 30 limited his tally in the ensuing 2. Bundesliga season to seven matches mid-season – none of those for the full 90 minutes – where he scored two goals. Bochum, after finishing the league first, was promoted again.

Wynalda returned to the States in 1996, signing with Major League Soccer (MLS). As part of the process of creating the new league, known players were distributed throughout the league's new teams (except for the Dallas Burn, which alone amongst all MLS sides never received a United States national team allocation from the 1994 World Cup era). The league allocated Wynalda to the San Jose Clash. On April 6, 1996, Wynalda scored the first goal in league history in its inaugural game as the Clash beat D.C. United 1–0. He was named U.S. Soccer Athlete of the Year for 1996.

Wynalda was loaned out to Club León in Mexico in 1999. He tore both the ACL and medial meniscus on his left knee while with Leon, which put him out of action for several months.

=== New England Revolution ===
After missing the first eleven games of the 1999 season, the Clash traded Wynalda to the Miami Fusion on June 1, 1999. On July 7, 2000, the Fusion turned around and traded Wynalda to the New England Revolution along with future draft considerations for defender Ivan McKinley. On August 12, 2000, Wynalda made his first appearance for the Revolution, coming on as a 79th-minute substitute for Imad Baba in the Revolution's loss to the MetroStars. He recorded his first assist for the club a week later in the Revolution's 2-1 home win over the Tampa Bay Mutiny. His first start came on September 3 in the Revolution's 2-0 loss to D.C. United. On September 19, 2000, in the MLS Cup Playoff Quarterfinals, Wynalda scored his first goal for the Revolution, the opener in their 2-1 victory over the Chicago Fire. It was the club's first-ever playoff win (the Revolution were subsequently eliminated from the series, losing 2 games to 1 in the best-of-three tie).

=== Chicago Fire ===
In February 2001, the Revolution re-signed Wynalda, but would deal him to the Chicago Fire on May 3, 2001, for John Wolyniec and a third-round pick in the 2002 MLS SuperDraft. Despite the season being underway when he arrived, Wynalda would end up as the Fire's leading scorer for 2001, recording 10 goals and 5 assists in MLS Play. The Fire waived Wynalda on January 15, 2002.

=== Later career ===
In 2002, Wynalda attempted to join the Los Angeles Galaxy, announcing that he planned to retire with the team. However, the negotiations with the Galaxy did not work out and he signed for the Charleston Battery of the USL First Division. Wynalda joined the team only to tear his anterior cruciate ligament in a pre-season match. He elected to retire from professional soccer and became a broadcast announcer.

== International career ==
Wynalda earned his first cap with the United States national team against Costa Rica on February 2, 1990. On March 14, 1990, he signed a contract with the United States Soccer Federation which made him a full-time national team player. Later that year, Wynalda played in the 1990 FIFA World Cup in Italy, his first World Cup, earning a red card against Czechoslovakia, for retaliating against midfielder Ľubomír Moravčík, who had backed into Wynalda during a dead ball play throw in, pushing Moravčík to the ground from behind in front of the referee, linesman, field judge and both teams' benches (erupting the Czech bench), becoming the first U.S. player to be ejected from a World Cup match. The Slovak player's treatment of Wynalda was in retaliation for a wildly thrown elbow on another teammate in the first half. Wynalda was lucky not to have been red carded then, only to be ejected in the 53rd minute leaving his side a man down for the remaining 37 minutes of the second half.

Wynalda was a part of the United States squad that won the 1991 CONCACAF Gold Cup. In the final the US beat Honduras 4–3 on penalties after a 0–0 stalemate after extra time led the game to penalties. Wynalda started every game of the tournament for the United States and scored the third goal for the US in their second group stage match against Guatemala, which the US won 3–0.

In the 1994 World Cup, Wynalda scored on a free kick from 28 yards as the United States tied Switzerland. He also played in Copa America 1995, where he scored against Chile and Argentina.

In 1998, Wynalda participated in his third World Cup, one of only three United States players (the others being Tab Ramos and Marcelo Balboa) to have earned that honor at that time. He finished the 1998 World Cup with no goals.

In 2000, Wynalda retired from the United States national team as its all-time leading scorer with 34 goals in 106 appearances. He was the sole owner of the record until 2007, when Landon Donovan tied the record with a penalty kick goal against Mexico in the 2007 CONCACAF Gold Cup Final. Wynalda lost the record when Donovan scored yet another penalty kick in a friendly match against Sweden on January 19, 2008.

Wynalda was named the Honda U.S. Player of the Decade for the 1990s, was named to the CONCACAF All-Decade Team of the 1990s and was elected to the National Soccer Hall of Fame in 2004. In 2006, he was named to the Ventura County Sports Hall of Fame.

== Coaching career ==
In 2005, Bakersfield Brigade of the USL Premier Development League hired Wynalda as its technical director, and in 2007 he agreed to a short-term playing contract with the team during the last few matches of their season. On May 1, 2008, he signed a formal season-long agreement to play the entire campaign with the Brigade as a full member of the 2008 playing squad.

He has also continued to play with an over-30s amateur team in Los Angeles, Hollywood United, alongside former U.S. internationals Alexi Lalas and John Harkes, former French international Frank Leboeuf, former Welsh international player Vinnie Jones, and actor Anthony La Paglia. United plays in the Los Angeles Olympic Soccer League.

=== Cal FC ===
Wynalda has been the head coach of Cal FC since 2012 and his side received attention in the 2012 Lamar Hunt U.S. Open Cup when they reached the fourth round of the tournament, upsetting USL Pro side Wilmington Hammerheads 4–0 and Major League Soccer side Portland Timbers 1–0 along the way.

Cal FC's victory over the Timbers made them the second-ever USASA side to beat an MLS side (the first being Dallas Roma FC beating Chivas USA in 2006), as well as the first amateur side to beat an MLS one without needing penalty kicks. It stands as the biggest upset in the tournament's history, especially considering the Timbers featured their regular starting lineup.

=== Atlanta Silverbacks ===
On July 2, 2012, it was announced that Wynalda would become the interim head coach and team adviser of the new North American Soccer League's Atlanta Silverbacks.

On January 7, 2014, the Silverbacks announced they would get rid of the head coach position and have Wynalda act as the manager and technical director of the team. This is something rarely done by a professional soccer club.

=== Las Vegas Lights FC ===
On October 17, 2018, Las Vegas Lights FC of the USL announced that Wynalda would be their new head coach and technical director.

=== New Amsterdam FC ===
On July 30, 2020, New Amsterdam FC of the National Independent Soccer Association announced Wynalda has the team's first head coach. On August 17, following two preseason tournament matches and five days prior to the start of the fall season, Wynalda announced his departure for personal reasons.

== Broadcast career ==
After retiring, Wynalda began working as a soccer analyst for ESPN. Along with Alexi Lalas, he was the channel's in-studio analyst for the 2006 FIFA World Cup on English-language broadcasts. Wynalda was one of the most vocal critics of U.S. head coach Bruce Arena during the tournament. However, after the World Cup, he was amicably paired in-studio with Arena as co-analysts for some 2006 MLS Cup playoff games, a successful arrangement which continued with ESPN's coverage of the US National Team in 2007. Wynalda was one of the main analysts for ESPN and ABC during the 2007 Major League Soccer season.

In 2008, he became columnist for Major League Soccer Magazine, an independent soccer magazine licensed with MLS and based in Los Angeles.

In August 2009, Fox Soccer Channel announced that Eric Wynalda would replace Steven Cohen as the co-host of the weekly discussion show, Fox Football Fone-in and partner up with Nick Webster who coached alongside Eric with Cal FC during their historic run in the U.S. Open Cup. In addition, Wynalda began working as a commentator for some of the channel's MLS broadcasts, and as an in-studio analyst during pre-game, half-time, and post-game segments for the UEFA Champions League.

In June & July 2010, Wynalda covered the 2010 FIFA World Cup for Yahoo! Sports as a video blog analyst.

He is currently an analyst for Fox Sports 1, covering Bundesliga, UEFA Champions League, and FA Cup.

In October 2015, Wynalda joined SiriusXM FC 85 as the host of the new program WTF: Wynalda Talks Football. Joined by the 'Stat Man' David Mosse, Eric covers the world of soccer, pop culture, and everything in between. The show airs Monday, Wednesday, and Friday from 7pm-9pm Eastern on SiriusXM FC 85.

== Personal life ==
Wynalda married Amanda Fletcher in 2014. They live in Thousand Oaks with their three children and his three children from a previous marriage. His daughter, San Diego Wave's Tatum Wynalda, played college soccer for the Pepperdine Waves.

Wynalda's house in the Westlake Village neighborhood was destroyed in the November 2018 Woolsey Fire. Wynalda and his family had evacuated to relatives in Corona, California, where he watched footage of the fire on television. Of the 162 houses in Wynalda's Westlake Village tract, his home was the only one that burned.

== Career statistics ==
Scores and results list the United States' goal tally first, score column indicates score after each Wynalda goal.

List of international goals scored by Eric Wynalda
No.	Date	Venue	Opponent	Score	Result	Competition
1	February 4, 1990	Miami, Florida, United States	Colombia	1–1	1–1	1990 Marlboro Cup
2	April 8, 1990	St. Louis, Missouri, United States	Iceland	1–0	4–1	Friendly
3	April 8, 1990	St. Louis, Missouri, United States	Iceland	2–0	4–1	Friendly
4	May 5, 1990	Piscataway, New Jersey, United States	Malta	1–0	1–0	Friendly
5	May 30, 1990	Eschen, Liechtenstein	Liechtenstein	3–1	4–1	Friendly
6	June 1, 1991	Foxboro, Massachusetts, United States	Republic of Ireland	1–0	1–1	Friendly
7	July 1, 1991	Pasadena, California, United States	Guatemala	3–0	3–0	1991 CONCACAF Gold Cup
8	February 2, 1992	Pontiac, Michigan, United States	CIS	1–0	2–1	Friendly
9	April 4, 1992	Stanford, California, United States	China	2–0	5–0	Friendly
10	April 4, 1992	Stanford, California, United States	China	5–0	5–0	Friendly
11	April 29, 1992	Dublin, Ireland	Republic of Ireland	1–4	1–4	Friendly
12	October 19, 1992	Riyadh, Saudi Arabia	Ivory Coast	3–1	5–2	1992 King Fahd Cup
13	July 10, 1993	Dallas, Texas, United States	Jamaica	1–0	1–0	1993 CONCACAF Gold Cup
14	July 14, 1993	Dallas, Texas, United States	Panama	1–1	2–1	1993 CONCACAF Gold
15	June 18, 1994	Pontiac, Michigan, United States	Switzerland	1–1	1–1	1994 FIFA World Cup
16	July 8, 1995	Paysandú, Uruguay	Chile	1–0	2–1	1995 Copa America
17	July 8, 1995	Paysandú, Uruguay	Chile	2–0	2–1	1995 Copa America
18	July 14, 1995	Paysandú, Uruguay	Argentina	3–0	3–0	1995 Copa America
19	January 12, 1996	Anaheim, California, United States	Trinidad and Tobago	1–1	3–2	1996 Gold Cup
20	January 12, 1996	Anaheim, California, United States	Trinidad and Tobago	2–1	3–2	1996 Gold Cup
21	January 15, 1996	Anaheim, California, United States	El Salvador	1–0	2–0	1996 CONCACAF Gold Cup
22	January 20, 1996	Los Angeles, California, United States	Guatemala	1–0	3–0	1996 CONCACAF Gold Cup
23	May 26, 1996	New Britain, Connecticut, United States	Scotland	1–1	2–1	Friendly
24	June 16, 1996	Pasadena, California, United States	Mexico	1–0	2–2	1996 U.S. Cup
25	August 30, 1996	Los Angeles, California, United States	El Salvador	2–0	3–1	Friendly
26	November 3, 1996	Washington, D.C., United States	Guatemala	1–0	2–0	1998 World Cup qualification
27	November 10, 1996	Richmond, Virginia, United States	Trinidad and Tobago	2–0	2–0	1998 World Cup qualification
28	January 29, 1997	Kunming, China	China	1–2	1–2	Friendly
29	March 16, 1997	Stanford, California, United States	Canada	1–0	3–0	1998 World Cup qualification
30	March 23, 1997	San José, Costa Rica	Costa Rica	1–1	2–3	1998 World Cup qualification
31	October 3, 1997	Washington, D.C., United States	Jamaica	1–0	1–1	1998 World Cup qualification
32	February 1, 1998	Oakland, California, United States	Cuba	2–0	3–0	1998 CONCACAF Gold Cup
33	November 17, 1999	Marrakesh, Morocco	Morocco	1–1	1–2	Friendly
34	February 12, 2000	Miami, Florida	Haiti	2–0	3–0	2000 CONCACAF Gold Cup

== Honors ==
United States

- CONCACAF Gold Cup: 1991

Individual

- MLS All-Star: 1996
- MLS Goal of the Year Award: 1996

== See also ==
- List of men's footballers with 100 or more international caps
