= Fox Football Fone-in =

- Starring: Eric Wynalda and Nick Webster and Nick Geber and Steven Cohen
- Country of origin: United States

Production
- Running time: 2 hours

Original release
- Network: Fox Soccer Channel
- Release: August 14, 2007 – August 15, 2010

Fox Football Fone-in (previously known as Fox Football Friday) was a football (soccer) telephone call-in program that was shown on Monday evenings on Fox Soccer Channel during the August to May Premier League season. However, as of August 2010, the show was cancelled. The show was hosted by Nick Webster (who replaced original host Nick Geber) and Eric Wynalda, and Temryss Lane reads off the e-mails. Wynalda was an incoming replacement for Steven Cohen, one of the original hosts. The show was geared towards an American audience, and focused primarily on the Premier League, although Major League Soccer, the English and U.S. national teams, as well as other club and country competitions were frequently covered such as the UEFA Champions League, European Championship and World Cup finals and qualifiers.

Viewers would call in to discuss football related topics. Most of the topics concern recent matches and current football news. Nick Webster is a supporter of League Two side Leyton Orient, with his favorite Premier League team being Arsenal, though Webster plays more of a neutral role than when Geber, a staunch Liverpool fan, hosted the show.

The show was 2 hours in length and throughout the 2 hours, supporters from all over the country have their say by calling, e-mailing, or simply, texting Nick and Eric.
