= Sports Byline USA =

American sports radio network

- Type: Radio network
- Country: United States

History
- Launch date: October 24, 1988; 38 years ago

Coverage
- Availability: International, through multi-media platforms and regional affiliates and satellite radio

Links
- Webcast: Listen Live; Listen Live (mp3)
- Website: sportsbyline.com

Sports Byline USA is an international sports radio network based in the United States. Sports Byline USA is also the name of the flagship program on the network. It was the first national sports talk show and was launched on October 24, 1988. Sports Byline USA is located in San Francisco, California. Nationally, the network claims programming is heard on 200 satellite radio stations, was on Sirius Satellite Radio channel 122, and on CRN Digital Talk Radio Networks channel 2. The station is also available on several international stations and is the main sports programming of the American Forces Network which broadcasts on 500 radio stations in 177 countries. Sports Byline USA is no longer on Sirius XM 122 which is now CNBC, but its sister program, Sports Overnight America is on Sirius XM 203.

== Broadcast network ==
Sports Byline programming, which is the main sports news provider for the American Forces Network. and also broadcasts on these platforms:

- Sports Byline Channel on iHeartRadio
- Sports Byline Channel on TuneIn
- Sports Byline Channel on Stitcher Radio
- Channel 2 of CRN Digital Talk Radio Networks
- SiriusXM
- Sports Byline's website
- Over 200 affiliate satellite radio stations in the USA

== Background ==
In 1988, when Willie Mays toured to promote his new book Say Hey: the Autobiography of Willie Mays, Mays was Ron Barr's first guest for the first hour of the first broadcast of Sports Byline USA.

Barr used his knowledge as a sports anchor for KIRO-TV in Seattle and former NBC affiliate KRON-TV in San Francisco., his connections as a sportscaster for the Washington Huskies, the Seattle SuperSonics, the Boston Celtics and the Stanford Cardinal and his journalism background, reporting for the Washington Post, to build an affiliate satellite network of radio stations across the country that were part of the Sports Byline launch. He also connected with the American Forces Network, to provide their main sports programming content.

In 2020, there are over 35 talk show hosts on the 24/7 network, which still maintains its original concept: to give sports fans across the nation the chance to call in and talk to their favorite athletes. The network's hosts take listener calls on major issues in the sports world.

== Leadership ==
Sports Byline USA's staff includes Chairman/Host, Ron Barr, President Darren Peck and its limited partnership group. Included in the group are 20-time Wimbledon Champion Billie Jean King, former NFL running back Darrin Nelson, super sports attorney Leigh Steinberg and other successful business professionals. Bill Walsh, the Hall of Fame and 3-time Super Bowl winning coach, was on the Sports Byline USA Partnership Advisory Board of Directors.

== Spotlights ==
=== American Football Network ===
Sports Byline USA had signed on to be the radio distributor of broadcasts of the All American Football League, with the games being produced by Touchdown Radio Productions. The AAFL suspended operations in March 2008, one month prior to its launch, and has yet to begin play as of 2011.

=== Ron Barr On Location ===
Barr's close relationship with the American Forces Network includes traveling to be with the American troops in Iraq and Afghanistan, with live interviews of sports celebrities like Tom Brady, Warren Moon, Anthony Muñoz, Adonal Foyle and Bill Romanowski and coaches Phil Jackson, Marv Levy and Brian Billick to lift the spirits of American Forces deployed there.

=== Library of Congress Collection ===
In January 2013, the U.S. Library of Congress acquired more than 4,000 recordings of interviews by Ron Barr broadcast between 1988 and 2003. The recordings are digitized at the Library's Packard Campus in Culpeper, Virginia. The collection includes a wide range of players, coaches, and more, including Bill Russell (baseball), John Wooden, George Steinbrenner and Earl Lloyd the Alexandria, Virginia native who in 1950 became the first African-American to play in the National Basketball Association. The collection includes a large archive of audio interviews with Negro league baseball players

=== Sports Byline: a US Post Office for Special Postal Cancellation ===
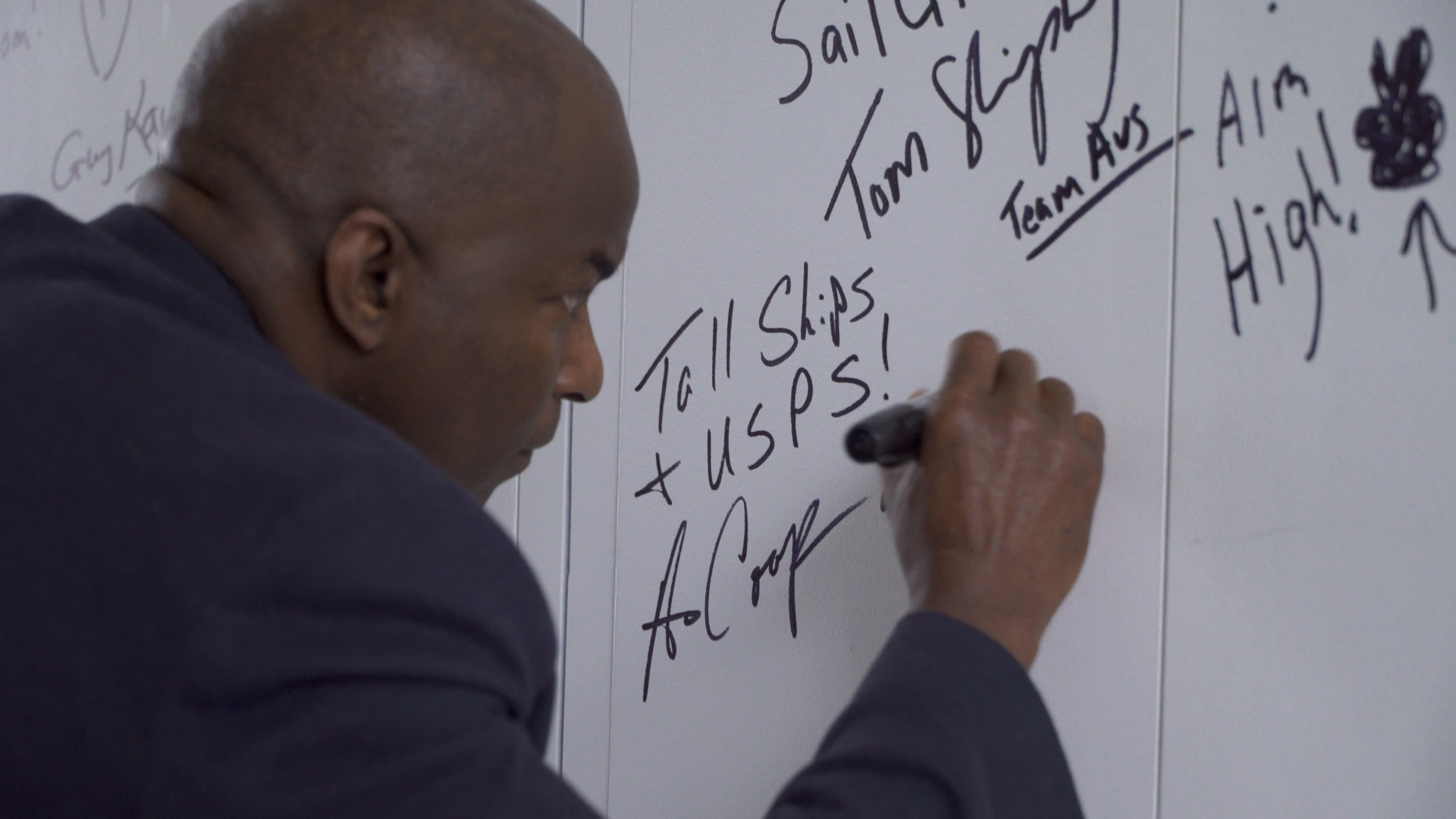
On April 23, 2019 Sail Sport Talk at Sports Byline became a post office for the USPS Building Bridges Special Postal Cancellation. SF Postmaster Abraham P. Cooper signs celebrity wall under Tom Slingsby's signature

On April 23, 2020, the United States Postal Service designated Sports Byline as a Building Bridges Pier 39 Postal Station for the USPS Building Bridges Special Postal Cancellation Series. The Ceremony took place live on Sail Sport Talk with Karen Earle Lile and Rick Tittle as co-hosts and Winston Bumpus, receiving the first inking of the cancellation on behalf of the Lady Washington from Postmaster Abraham Cooper.

Sail Sport Talk with Karen Lile is a Talk Show partnered with Sports Byline and placed inside Tittilating Sports to engage mainstream sports fans with the international world of sailing. It began April 4, 2019 and continues to the present.

Tittlating Sports with Rick Tittle Rick Tittle made the switch to radio with Sports Byline USA in 1999, beginning as a producer and production director, before starting his Titillating Sports show in 2003. Rick’s humorous and thoughtful approach to sports talk lends itself to all sports, as Rick lets the callers drive the topics of the day. Rick Tittle's show, which live broadcasts 3 hours, five days a week, also features partnerships with other hosts, such as A.I. Expert Neil Sahota.

== Programs and hosts ==
Sports Byline represents a diversity of sports in its 24/7 programming.

Major syndicated shows broadcast from Sports Byline USA
Program title	Hosts
5th Street Soccer	Nick Geber
5th Street Sports	Nick Geber, others
A Little R and R	Howard Robinson and Larry Robertson
Beyond The Scoreboard	Rick Horrow
College Sports Insiders	Pat Olson
Complete Player Development	Nate Trosky and Trent Mongero
The Jim Beaver Show	Jim Beaver
Ferrall Coast to Coast	Scott Ferrall
Fish Talk	John Henigin
The Fred Dryer Sports Hour	Fred Dryer
The Morning After	Gabriel Morency
The No Holds Barred Show	Pedro Fernandez
Out and About	Ron Barr, Charlie Coane, and Ginny Prior
Outdoor Guys Radio	Ken Taylor
Race Chaser Radio	Tom Baker and Jacob Seelman
Real Golf Radio	Brian Taylor and Bob Casper
Ring Talk Radio	Pedro Fernandez
Sail Sport Talk	Karen Earle Lile, Rick Tittle
Speed Freeks	Kenny Sargent, Crash Gladys, & Bill Wood
Sports Byline Sunday	Andy Dorf and Fred Wallin
Sports Byline USA	Ron Barr
Sports Econ 101	Edward Brown
Sports Overnight America	Jeff Rich and Jen Rich Marty Tirrell...Charlie Gibbons Saturday Nights Football 5th Quarter Takeover....
Tee to Green: The Golf Show	Jay Ritchie & Jerry Butenhoff
Titillating Sports	Rick Tittle
Unpackin' It	Bryce Johnson
Video Game Review	Rick Tittle
World Soccer Talk Radio	Nate Abaurrea
Wrestling Observer Live	Bryan Alvarez, Mike Sempervive

== Sales representation ==
On June 30, 2009, Sports Byline USA signed an advertising sales representation agreement with Focus 360 LLC. Focus 360's Chief Executive Officer, Phil Brown, said that the National Focus network and syndication division will sell Sports Byline USA to advertisers on a stand-alone basis as well as in conjunction with National Baseball Network, another major sports network represented by National Focus.
