= Fox Soccer Plus =

American sports-based television channel

- Headquarters: Los Angeles, California, U.S.

Programming
- Language: English
- Picture format: 720p (HDTV)

Ownership
- Owner: Fox Sports Media Group (Fox Corporation)
- Sister channels: Fox Sports 1 Fox Sports 2 Fox Deportes; Big Ten Network

History
- Launched: April 26, 2005; 21 years ago
- Former names: Setanta Sports (until February 28, 2010)

Links
- Website: foxsports.com/soccer/plus

Availability

Streaming media
- Fox Sports app: Watch live
- FOX.com: Watch live
- FuboTV: Internet Protocol Television
- Hulu + Live TV: Internet Protocol Television
- YouTube TV: Internet Protocol Television

Fox Soccer Plus (formerly Setanta Sports) is an American sports channel dedicated to soccer and rugby league football. Launched in 2005 by the Irish sports broadcaster Setanta Sports to offer live and tape-delayed mainstream sports events in the United States and Caribbean, it was rebranded on March 1, 2010, as a spin-off of the now-defunct Fox Soccer after its owner News Corporation acquired the channel and its coverage rights from Setanta in January 2010.

Despite the September 2013 replacement of Fox Soccer with FXX, Fox Soccer Plus remains operational, although in recent years, the channel has lost many of its key events that had carried over from the Fox Soccer Channel.

== History ==
Launched on April 26, 2005, by Setanta Sports, which is based in Ireland, the channel had the rights to delayed Manchester United and Chelsea matches on MUTV and Chelsea TV, which were shown in segments within the channel. Any given broadcaster can only gain access to a maximum of two club channels under the current Premier League international TV rights.

As of July 27, 2009 the ownership structure of Setanta Sports North America Limited changed. Setanta Sports North America Limited was owned by Sabloss. Both Setanta Sports Channel Ireland Limited and Setanta Sports North America Limited were licensed by the Broadcasting Commission of Ireland.

On January 27, 2010, Setanta Sports announced that they had reached an agreement with Fox Soccer Channel to transfer rights to select programming (soccer and rugby) that would be effective as of March 1. In addition, Setanta Sports announced that they would "cease" broadcasting the channel in the U.S. and Caribbean on February 28, 2010. The channel was rebranded from Setanta Sports to Fox Soccer Plus on March 1, 2010, at 12:00 a.m. EST.

== Coverage rights ==
=== Soccer ===
With the loss of many of its marquee properties, very limited content remained on the channel. As of 2019, Fox Soccer Plus's soccer programming consists of replays of Major League Soccer games shown on Fox or FS1, replays of FIFA events (although some events from lower level FIFA competitions that Fox holds the rights to are sometimes shown live) and occasionally, games from the Liga MX, Italy's Serie B, Copa do Brasil, the UEFA Nations League, the Coupe de France, the Canadian Premier League, and as of 2026, coverage of select games of the Major Arena Soccer League.

=== Rugby League ===
Fox Soccer Plus continues to air rugby league content from Australia and England.

Currently, Fox Soccer Plus airs three of Australia's National Rugby League games per round, all three State of Origin games (often shown live on FS2 first), all playoff games, and the NRL Grand Final. With the exception of the Origin games, the broadcast source is Fox League, which shares the basic video feed from Nine Network but inserts its own graphics and commentators, meaning that Fox Soccer Plus viewers do not have the option of the announcers and production values of Nine.

=== Australian Rules Football ===
Fox Soccer Plus typically carries four regular-season Australian Football League matches each week, with three of those shown live and one being a replay of the one game a week shown live first on FS2; all playoffs and the Grand Final are carried, along with preseason matches and the AFL Women's league. Fox Soccer Plus coverage comes from both Fox Footy and the Seven Network.

With American-born Mason Cox playing in the league, most matches featuring Collingwood, Cox's former team, tend to be shown.

=== Former ===
==== As Setanta Sports ====
===== Soccer =====
- Shared live rights with ESPN2 and Fox Soccer Channel of the Barclays Premier League. Matches were broadcast on Saturdays at 10 a.m. ET (a second live match aired on Setanta Xtra and was rebroadcast on the main channel later that day), Sundays at 8:30 a.m. and first-choice of any mid-week matches. Matches from the Saturday 10 a.m. ET timeslot that were not originally shown live on ESPN or Fox Soccer Channel were shown on tape delay in the evening on Setanta Sports.
- Shared live rights with ESPN360 of live Football League Cup.
- Shared live rights with Fox Soccer Channel of the UEFA Champions League (Setanta also had some matches delayed to later that night or the following day).
- Shared live rights with ESPN360 of Football League Championship, League One and League Two matches, including playoffs.
- Live Euro 2012 qualifiers. Others aired on tape delay either later on in the day, or a few days later if the live broadcast was on pay-per-view.
- Live French Ligue 1.
- Live Russian Premier League.
- Scottish Cup.
- Delayed and Live Scottish Premier League matches. The delayed matches consisted of Old Firm matches which aired live at designated bars/restaurants on Setanta Premium. On the rare occasion where neither Celtic nor Rangers are on, the game aired live.
- Live international soccer, including friendlies and 2010 FIFA World Cup qualification matches.
- Highlights shows for most of the leagues Setanta broadcasts.

===== Rugby Union =====
- Rugby World Cup.
- Live Guinness Premiership, rugby union club competition of England.
- Live Pro14, rugby union clubs of Ireland, Italy, Scotland, South Africa and Wales.
- Live Heineken Cup, rugby union club cup competition for 6 top European nations.
- Live Super Rugby, rugby union clubs of, then, Australia, New Zealand, and South Africa. (Teams from Argentina and Japan added in later years)
- Live IRB Sevens Rugby.
- Live Currie Cup, rugby union club cup competition for South Africa.
- Six Nations rugby union competition on tape delay
- Summer and fall internationals, a mixture of live and tape delayed
- Live Tri-Nations, international Southern Hemisphere rugby union competition.

===== Other Events =====
- Selected live Gaelic Athletic Association events; delayed GAA Championship matches.
- Tape delayed A1GP - Auto racing; "world cup of motorsport"
- Same-day tape delayed Superleague Formula - Auto racing; fusion of soccer and motorsport

==== As Fox Soccer Plus ====
Fox Soccer Plus' coverage of Italy's Serie A and France's Ligue 1 ended in May 2012, after coverage of both moved to BeIN Sport starting with the 2012–2013 season. Fox Soccer Plus also had German Bundesliga coverage until 2020 when ESPN assumed the rights.

Fox Soccer Plus formerly held rights to all major properties in the SANZAAR countries—the Tri Nations involving the national teams of South Africa, New Zealand and Australia; Super Rugby, involving franchises from each of these countries; South Africa's Currie Cup; and New Zealand's ITM Cup. However, in 2011, Fox Soccer Plus lost broadcasting rights for Super Rugby and Tri Nations to DirecTV.

Fox Soccer Plus no longer has any rights to rugby union, previously the channel had rights to the Europe-wide Heineken Cup, the English Premiership and the Pro12 in the Celtic nations and Italy (although RaboDirect Pro 12 League matches were non-existent in Fox Soccer Plus' schedule for the first six weeks of the season).

== Availability and other services ==
Fox Soccer Plus is available nationally on DirecTV and Dish Network, and regionally on Verizon FiOS, Charter Spectrum, Cablevision, AT&T Uverse, and several streaming services.

When the channel was known as Setanta Sports, it offered the Setanta Sports Xtra channel at no extra charge to DirecTV customers in case two live events need to be aired simultaneously.

=== High Definition ===
Fox Soccer Plus's 720p HD feed is available nationally on DirecTV, and regionally on Charter Spectrum, AT&T U-verse, and Cablevision.

== Former services ==
=== Setanta Premium ===
As a part of Setanta Sports, Setanta Premium was available only to select commercial subscribers for Pay-Per-View events while most are broadcast delayed on the full-time channel.

- Gaelic Athletic Association Championship and League events.
- Scottish Premier League.
- FA Cup.
- Six Nations Championship in rugby union.
- Euro 2008 qualifiers, international soccer matches.
- FIFA World Cup Qualification, international soccer matches.
- UEFA Champions League and UEFA Cup matches.

This service charged customers a cover charge of $10–$20 per head, depending on the match.

=== Setanta Broadband ===
During its existence as Setanta Sports, Setanta also offered a broadband subscription service, Setanta Broadband, which allowed customers with a high speed internet connection to view some of the Setanta Sports channel content on their computers and includes access to pay-per-view events. Portuguese Liga soccer was available and Premier League matches were also broadcast starting the 2007–08 season on Setanta Broadband. Broadband customers did not receive Australian Football League matches as of July 2008, due to the league's new distribution deal with aussiesport.tv.
