= Bobby McMahon =

Scottish football analyst

Robert McMahon is a Scottish football analyst for Sportsnet. He appears exclusively on Soccer Central.

Born in Dundee, McMahon played football at the school and youth level, before going on to play for Tayport in Fife, then one of Scotland's top amateur teams. During his time with the Port, he was selected for a Scottish Amateurs team trial. He also had a brief spell at the junior level.

After emigrating to Canada in 1979, he played on and coached a number of teams in Winnipeg while representing Manitoba on many occasions, highlighted by a representative game against Bologna.

He was the chief operating officer of the 1999 Pan American Games.

In 2022 Bobby was part of a 15-person group called "Stuart's Band of Brothers" that walked the 96-mile West Highland Way as a fundraiser in memory of their friend Stuart Fraser. The group exceeded their fundraising target of £30,000 for Prostate Cancer UK.
