= Fox Soccer =

American specialty television channel specializing in soccer

- Headquarters: Houston, Texas, U.S.

Ownership
- Owner: 21st Century Fox (Fox Networks Group)
- Sister channels: Fox Soccer Plus

History
- Launched: November 1, 1997; 28 years ago
- Closed: September 2, 2013; 13 years ago
- Replaced by: FXX; Fox Soccer Plus (namesake)
- Former names: Fox Sports World (1997–2005); Fox Soccer Channel (2005–2011)

Links
- Website: foxsports.com/soccer

Fox Soccer was an American television specialty channel specializing in soccer, owned by News Corporation and later 21st Century Fox, that operated from 1997 to 2013. It originally broadcast rugby and Australian rules football, but during its last years on air was strictly devoted to soccer.

== History ==
Launched on November 1, 1997, when it was originally known as Fox Sports World. Channel was renamed to Fox Soccer Channel in 2005, later dropping the word "channel" from its name on August 13, 2011, Fox Soccer offered its own game programming for United States soccer leagues through arrangements with outside production companies.

Most of Fox Soccer's coverage which originated outside the CONCACAF region (North America, Central America, Caribbean) consisted of picking up international broadcast feeds to which Fox Soccer had the U.S. broadcast rights. The A-League broadcasts were produced by Fox Sports (Australia). The English coverage generally came to Fox Soccer direct from IMG, Input Media and The Media Company, which produce the Premier League and FA Cup/England national team world feed broadcasts and Fox Soccer News reports respectively.

The network's soccer coverage was not limited to game play; Fox Soccer aired reruns of Dream Team, a British soap opera that aired in the UK on Fox Soccer's corporate cousin Sky One until 2007 and focused on a fictional Premiership team. The channel also televised a live soccer talk-show, Fox Football Fone-in, featuring viewer calls and predictions for that weekend's Premier League matches. During the Premier League term, Fox Soccer also produced and aired a couple of studio-based shows surrounding its game coverage.

In 2006, Fox Soccer announced that they had dropped coverage of sports other than soccer. Amongst the leagues dropped were Super Rugby (rugby union), the Australian Football League (the principal Australian rules football league), and the Australian National Rugby League. The Super 14 games resided on Setanta Sports USA until it went off the air in early 2010, while ESPN offers the AFL. In return, Setanta gave Fox Soccer the rights to some national team matches that would not otherwise air live. After Setanta's demise in the US, News Corporation acquired most of Setanta USA's former rights and created the new Fox Soccer Plus as a second broadcast outlet.

Fox Sports World originally filled out its schedule with an eclectic mix of programming; among the sports featured (either in anthology form or actual events) were motorsports (prior to News Corporation's acquisition of SPEED, now Fox Sports 1), cricket, pool, darts, and extreme sports. It also aired the Final Four of the Euroleague in basketball; that league is now more extensively covered by NBA TV. Cricket, pool and darts currently see American coverage on Willow and ONE World Sports, which also now broadcasts some Sky Sports programming.

Until the middle of 2012, the morning hours on non-game days (when the English and European afternoon is timed to in the United States) and some odd afternoon half hours were slotted with paid programming time until additional loops of Fox Soccer News and Sky Sports News were placed in those slots.

The 720p high definition simulcast of Fox Soccer launched in January 2010. The signature promo voice of the network was Jimmy Hodson.

== Programming ==
The channel focused on soccer throughout the world. In the final year, the network's rights included; (all rights have moved to Fox Sports 1 and Fox Sports 2)

=== United Kingdom ===
- Premier League (1998–2013): Live and tape-delayed matches each week, plus weekly magazine (Premier League World), preview (Premier League Preview Show, and Matchday) and recap (Premier League Review and Goals on Sunday) shows. Besides matches on Fox Soccer, Fox Deportes and Fox Soccer Plus, up to 3 matches each season were available live free-to-air on Fox. Up to 74 matches each season were sublicensed to ESPN, Inc. Contract ran through May 2013, at which point coverage went to NBC Sports/NBCSN to the present day.
- FA Community Shield, live through August 2017; future editions will be carried on Fox Sports 1 or 2.
- FA Cup through May 2013. Some matches aired on Fox Soccer Plus.
- England under-21 – selected home matches through May 2013. Other home matches aired on Fox Soccer Plus.
- England national football team – selected home friendlies through May 2013 and home qualifying matches for FIFA World Cup 2014 through October 2013 (moved to Fox Sports 1 or 2). Other home matches aired on Fox Soccer Plus.

=== Australia ===
- A-League: One live match per week, a weekly highlights package, and the A-League Grand Final. Contract runs through April 2015, will likely move to Fox Sports 2.
- State of Origin series, live coverage, as well as the NRL Grand Final. Other National Rugby League matches will air on Fox Soccer Plus, with other rights moving to Fox Sports 2.

=== Japan ===
- J. League Gambare! weekly highlights package.

=== United States ===
- United Soccer Leagues, live coverage of selected matches, including:
  - The championship matches of all USL leagues — USL Pro, Premier Development League, and W-League.
- College soccer: up to three live matches each week in September and October via an agreement with the National Soccer Coaches Association of America (NSCAA). Other matches may air on Fox Sports Networks affiliates or Fox College Sports multiplex channels as part of multi-sport deals between various conferences and those channels.
- National Professional Soccer League: Fox Sports World began televising a handful of NPSL games in August 2000. Previously, some local Fox regional sports networks had carried NPSL games.

=== Other events ===
- UEFA:
  - UEFA Super Cup, live coverage through August 2014.
  - UEFA Champions League, live coverage through May 2015. Fox Sports Media Group has the first, second, and third picks of live matches for each night of the competition. Different live matches will air on Fox Soccer, Fox Soccer Plus, Fox Deportes and regional Fox Sports Net affiliates, with rebroadcasts on Fox Soccer. DirecTV broadcasts all remaining matches during the playoff round and the group stage. Fox Soccer will air semifinal matches on Tuesdays and FX will air semifinal matches on Wednesdays. The final will air live free-to-air on Fox.
  - UEFA Europa League, live coverage for the 2012–2015 seasons plus a highlight show for each round of the competition. Different matches will air live on Fox Soccer, Fox Soccer Plus and Fox Deportes & DirecTV ch. 480–489 in HD.
- CONCACAF:
  - CONCACAF Champions League, live coverage including any matches that involve Major League Soccer teams based in the U.S., plus both semifinals and the final, through April 2017.
  - Live coverage of the 2011 CONCACAF Gold Cup, featuring all U.S. matches plus the final.
  - Copa América Centenario, live coverage in 2016.
- FIFA (2015–2022):
  - FIFA World Cup 2018 and 2022.
  - FIFA Women's World Cup 2015 and 2019.
  - FIFA Confederations Cup 2017 and 2021.
  - FIFA U-20 World Cup 2015, 2017, 2019 and 2021.
  - FIFA U-17 World Cup 2015, 2017, 2019 and 2021.
  - FIFA U-20 Women's World Cup 2016, 2018, 2020 and 2022.
  - FIFA U-17 Women's World Cup 2016, 2018, 2020 and 2022.
  - FIFA Club World Cup through December 2012.

=== Sky Sports News ===
Fox Soccer picked up the feed from its corporate cousin, Sky Sports News in the United Kingdom. In 2007, Fox Soccer began running the feed live at 2 a.m., noon and 7 p.m. Eastern Time (the 7 p.m. edition moved to Fox Soccer Plus effective September 2010). This arrangement dates back to its days as Fox Sports World, and offers updated soccer news throughout the day (along with coverage of other international sports such as rugby, cricket and British horse racing.), along with the morning rundown of English newspaper sports pages.

During the international off-season from May–August 2010 the 2am simulcast of the 7am GMT hour was replaced with a tape-delayed broadcast of Sky News at Ten from SSN & Fox Soccer sister network Sky News, which features a comprehensive recap of the day in sports; likely this was due to 2010 World Cup highlights exclusivity by American rightsholder ESPN, in addition to Sky Sports News converting their operations to high definition. The 2am simulcast of Sky Sports News was restored in August 2010 with the start of the European season.

All simulcasts of Sky Sports News were discontinued on July 1, 2013, as Fox Soccer began their wind-down of operations, with Fox apparently deciding not to carry the program over to either Fox Sports 1, Fox Sports 2, or Fox Soccer Plus.

=== Fox Soccer Report and Fox Soccer News ===
From September 2002 to August 16, 2012, Fox Soccer's flagship studio program was Fox Soccer Report (originally Fox Sports World Report), anchored by Michelle Lissel, Eoin O'Callaghan and Asa Rehman, with former Scottish amateur footballer Bobby McMahon, produced by the Shaw Media–owned Fox Sports World Canada at the studios of CKND Winnipeg.

After Fox Sports World ceased operations in April 2012, Fox Soccer made similar arrangements with the Canadian sports channel Sportsnet for a replacement program. The Sportsnet-produced Fox Soccer News began airing August 17, 2012, with hosts Brendan Dunlop, Kara Lang, Ben Ennis, and analyst Thomas Rongen; McMahon also moved to Sportsnet and continued with Fox Soccer News, providing continuity between Fox Soccer Report and Fox Soccer News. It aired nightly at 10 p.m. Eastern (or after a live prime-time match – though highlights of that game would not be included because the show is taped), with a few re-airs overnight and during the morning.

With the launch of Fox Sports 1, the program was replaced by an in-house soccer news program, Fox Soccer Daily, on August 19, 2013 (Sportsnet continued to produce and air the prior program as Soccer Central), though that show was canceled by the end of the year. It was replaced with NFL playoff and NASCAR-focused programming and eventually, a video simulcast of Mike Francesa's radio program.

=== Past programming ===
- Argentina: One match every week from the Argentine Primera División, plus the weekly highlights show Fútbol de Primera, through the 2009–10 season.
- Mexico: Limited coverage of the Primera División through the early part of the 2007 Apertura season. Showed home games from teams such as Cruz Azul, Pachuca, Santos Laguna and Tecos UAG.
- France: Ligue 1 through the 2005–06 season.
- Germany: First Bundesliga through the 2005–06 season.
- Spain: Selected La Liga matches except those of FC Barcelona, Valencia CF, Real Madrid or Atlético Madrid, until 2004.
- Netherlands: Eredivisie in the 2004–05 season.
- United States:
  - Major League Soccer (2003–2011)
  - United States men's national soccer team and United States women's national soccer team: Selected friendlies, until 2012.
- Euro 2000
- FIFA:
  - FIFA Confederations Cup, through 2005.
  - FIFA U-20 World Cup, through 2005.
  - FIFA U-17 World Cup, through 2005.
- CONMEBOL: Copa Libertadores and Copa Sudamericana.
- Other sports
  - Super Rugby
  - Australian Football League
  - 2003 Rugby World Cup (delayed)

== Relaunch as FXX ==
Fox lost the U.S. television rights to broadcast Premier League soccer events to NBC, and the Italian Serie A, French Ligue 1 and EFL Championship rights to beIN Sports. As a result, Fox Soccer was replaced on September 2, 2013, by FXX, an entertainment sister network to FX. All of the remaining sports programming from Fox Soccer was moved to Fox Sports 1 and Fox Sports 2, which launched on August 17, 2013. FXX's primary focus is on comedies (resulting in FX and FXX maintaining a genre-based format similar to that of TBS and TNT) and features original and acquired comedy series, though feature films and some drama series are also broadcast on FXX – with first-run episodes of some of the channel's original series being carried over to the channel from FX.

Fox Soccer's run ended with a final full run of Being: Liverpool on September 2 from midnight–6am ET (with an FXX disclaimer card before the program), leading into FXX airing the pilot episode of Parks and Recreation an hour later at 7am ET, with paid programming with an FXX disclaimer card in front of each paid program in the hour between. The channel properly transferred from Fox Soccer to FXX an hour later, when a clip of FC Barcelona's Lionel Messi about to score a goal (two scenes taken from the UEFA Champions League matches on April 3, 2012, and March 12, 2013) was broken up by Frank Reynolds (Danny DeVito) of It's Always Sunny in Philadelphia coming through a leather couch (representing a television screen being "torn" through) being "birthed" in the nude (a scene taken from the 2009 Christmas special episode A Very Sunny Christmas), suggesting the "birthing" of FXX. The last live international event carried was a UEFA Champions League match between Celtic F.C. and FC Shakhter Karagandy from Celtic Park on August 28. The last live match to be carried by the network altogether was the National Women's Soccer League final between Portland Thorns FC and the Western New York Flash on August 31.

== See also ==
- List of Australian television series
