= Fox Sports World Canada =

Defunct Canadian TV channel

- Country: Canada
- Broadcast area: National
- Headquarters: Toronto, Ontario, Canada

Programming
- Picture format: 480i (SDTV)

Ownership
- Owner: Shaw Media

History
- Launched: September 7, 2001
- Closed: April 30, 2012 (10 years, 236 days)
- Replaced by: Sportsnet World

Fox Sports World Canada was a Canadian pay television channel. The channel's programming primarily featured soccer and covered other world sports such as rugby. Although its original Canadian Radio-television and Telecommunications Commission (CRTC) licence called for Fox Sports World Canada to carry soccer, cricket and rugby as their core sports, cricket and rugby matches almost disappeared from the channel after the first few years. Fox Sports World Canada's flagship program was the Fox Soccer Report, which comprised most of its Canadian content.

On October 27, 2010, Shaw Communications gained control of Fox Sports World Canada as a result of its acquisition of Canwest; which subsequently was renamed Shaw Media.

On March 6, 2012, Shaw Media released a statement announcing that they would cease the broadcast of Fox Sports World Canada on midnight of April 30 of that year. The company had been examining the possibility of launching a mainstream sports channel in competition with TSN and Sportsnet, but ultimately decided against it. Shaw claimed the channel "no longer makes strategic and economic sense for Shaw Media going forward" in light of that decision. The channel officially shut down on April 30, 2012, while its licence was officially revoked on April 19, 2016, nearly four years after the channel went off the air.

== Programming ==
Fox Sports World Canada featured both live and taped events from the following leagues and competitions:

- Australia: A-League, National Rugby League, Australian Football League
- England: Premier League, FA Cup, Super League
- France: Ligue 1
- Italy: Serie A
- United States: United Soccer Leagues (USL) First Division (also from Canada and Puerto Rico), Major Indoor Soccer League, NCAA Men's Soccer, NCAA Women's Soccer & WPS
- CONMEBOL: Copa Libertadores

=== Noted programs ===
- Asia Contender
- Football Asia - Soccer highlights from around Asia
- Football Rivalries
- Fox Soccer Report - Flagship news show that featured highlights from all the major leagues in Europe, South America, MLS, International competitions and more.
- Hyundai A-League Highlights - Highlights from the Hyundai A-League.
- PGA Tour Highlights
- Serie-A Highlights - Highlights from Italy's Serie A.
- Sports Unlimited
- Sky Sports News - A feed taken directly from the UK channel of the same name.

== See also ==
- Fox Soccer
