= Steal a Base, Steal a Taco =

American sports-related advertising campaign

- Client: Taco Bell
- Market: United States national
- Language: English
- Media: Live event promotion
- Product: Taco Breakfast Crunchwrap
- Release date(s): 2007
- Slogan: Steal a Base, Steal a Taco
- Country: United States
- Official website: tacobell.com/promotions/steal-a-taco

Steal a Base, Steal a Taco is a marketing gimmick by Taco Bell in which free tacos are offered to all customers in the United States of America to commemorate the first stolen base in Major League Baseball's World Series.

== History ==
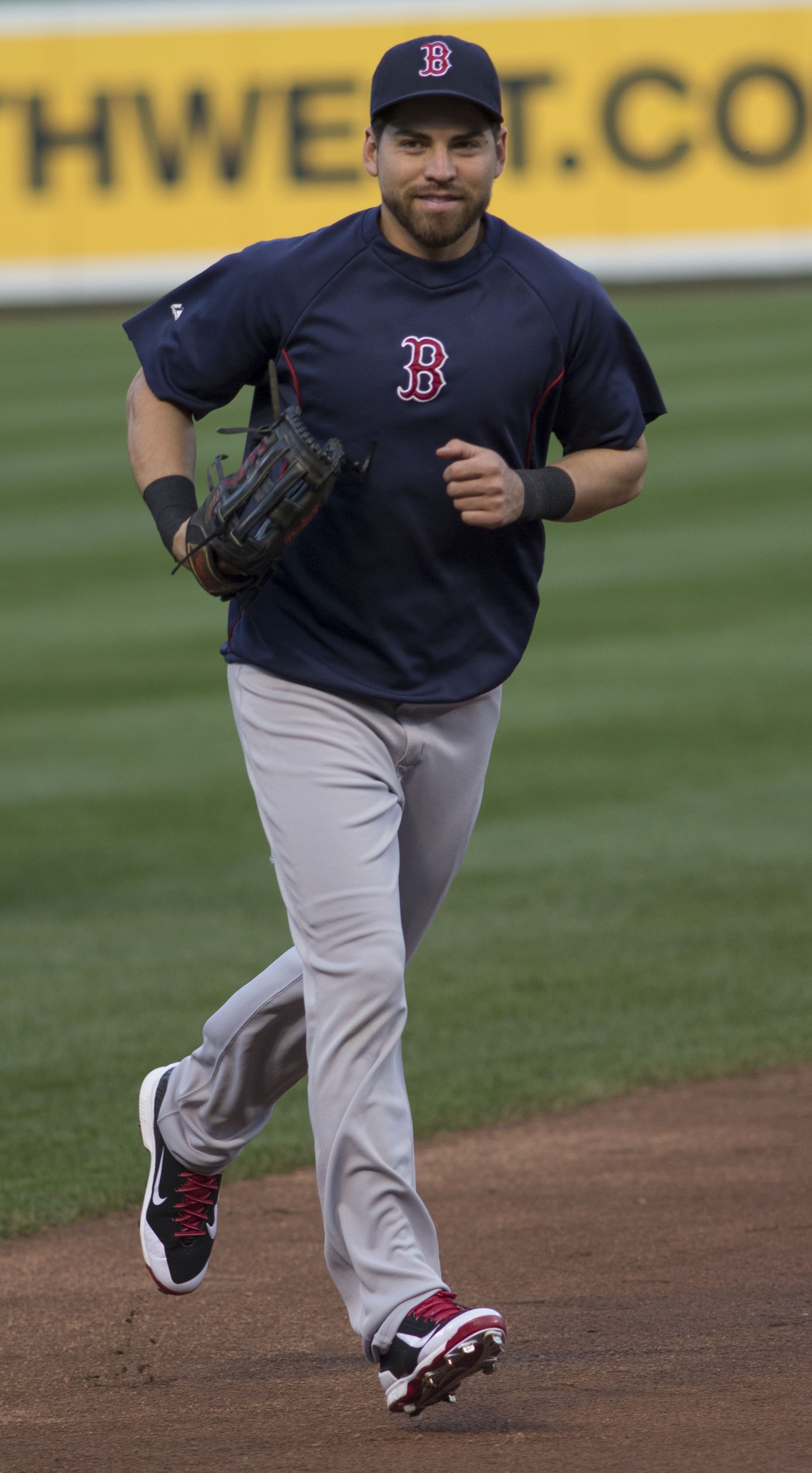
Jacoby Ellsbury's stolen base during Game 2 of the 2007 World Series resulted in the first Taco Bell giveaway per "Steal a Base, Steal a Taco".

Taco Bell first offered the "Steal a Base, Steal a Taco" promotion during the 2007 World Series. The company had run several prior World Series promotions that did not result in free food being given away. For example, during the 2003 World Series, the company would have given away a free soft drink and a taco to everyone in the United States if a player hit a home run onto a sign placed in Pro Player Stadium. A similar promotion had been staged in the 2002 World Series, with a floating target placed in McCovey Cove in San Francisco. Under the 2007 promotion, it any player from either team stole a base, the company would give away free Crunchy Seasoned Beef Tacos to everyone in the United States. This promotion was considered "something bound to happen".

After Jacoby Ellsbury of the Boston Red Sox stole a base in Game 2, the company made good on the promotion on October 30, 2007. The first taco giveaway, at participating restaurants between 2:00 p.m and 5:00 p.m., attracted large crowds in the Boston area for free tacos that normally would have cost US$ 0.77 ($1.17 in 2024). In areas less interested in the World Series, crowds were much thinner. The company also set up a web site, Donate Your Taco, for customers to donate the value of their free taco to the American Red Cross. Ellsbury himself went to a Taco Bell on the campus of Boston University to get a free taco, and the company donated $20,000 in Ellsbury's name to the Boys & Girls Clubs of America.

The promotion was again used in the 2008 World Series, with Jason Bartlett of the Tampa Bay Rays stealing a base in Game 1 to win free tacos for all Taco Bell customers in America on October 28, 2008. The company brought the promotion back in 2012 to promote the new Doritos Locos Taco, and ran the promotion during each World Series from 2015 through 2023. In each instance of the promotion, tacos have been given away, except for 2015 when the company gave away Breakfast Crunchwraps.

In 2019, the company partnered with BetMGM to offer real-money wagering on who the Taco Hero would be. In 2022, Taco Bell added the additional reward of a free soft drink to customers who correctly predict, via their mobile app, the Taco Hero of an upcoming series. Also in 2022, the company connected the taco giveaway to its loyalty program, giving enrolled customers 10 days after the first stolen base of the World Series to redeem their reward, to avoid crowds.

There was no Steal a Base, Steal a Taco promotion in 2024, due to Taco Bell not being an MLB sponsor during the 2024 World Series.

== Impact ==
Darren Rovell, reporting for CNBC, estimated that Taco Bell received $8 million ($12 million in 2024) of free advertising during the first two games of the 2007 World Series. However, critics included a staff member of The Boston Globe, who commented on a video clip played by Fox Sports that showed two Boston players discussing the promotion during a game; "Using the players to shill for your sponsors — however innocently — seems that much more unseemly. And when announcers do it, too, it's no wonder that the skeptics have the day." A later Globe editorial called for MLB to ban the use of such in-game promotions by players. At least one Taco Bell franchise owner declined to participate in the promotion.

In 2017, Taco Bell won a bronze Clio Award for "Steal a Base, Steal a Taco" in the Integrated Campaign category.

Although the World Series television ratings during the 2010s were lower than during prior years, Taco Bell's director of brand partnerships said in 2019 that the promotion had been successful for the chain, drawing new customers into restaurants and encouraging them to return.

In 2021, the National Baseball Hall of Fame and Museum, in partnership with Taco Bell to commemorate the 10th instance of the promotion, put the World Series base stolen by Ozzie Albies on display at the museum in Cooperstown, New York.

Analysis by a USA Today reporter suggests that the promotion may have influenced how early a stolen base occurs in the World Series, noting that between 2015 and 2022, "four of the eight World Series have seen a stolen base within the first frame. While it doesn't line up with the inaugural promotion of 2007 or the introduction of the Doritos Locos Tacos in 2012, it certainly can't be overlooked."

== "Taco Hero" players ==
The first player to steal a base in a World Series is called the "Taco Hero", with that term first appearing during the 2016 promotion.

Mookie Betts is the only player to have been a Taco Hero more than once, having accomplished the feat in 2018 with the Boston Red Sox and in 2020 with the Los Angeles Dodgers. The only team with more than one Taco Hero is the Boston Red Sox, with Ellsbury in 2007 and Betts in 2018.

The most recent Taco Hero is Ketel Marte of the Arizona Diamondbacks, who successfully stole a base in Game 1 of the 2023 World Series.

The following players have been the Taco Hero, stealing the first base of a World Series when Taco Bell ran a free taco promotion.

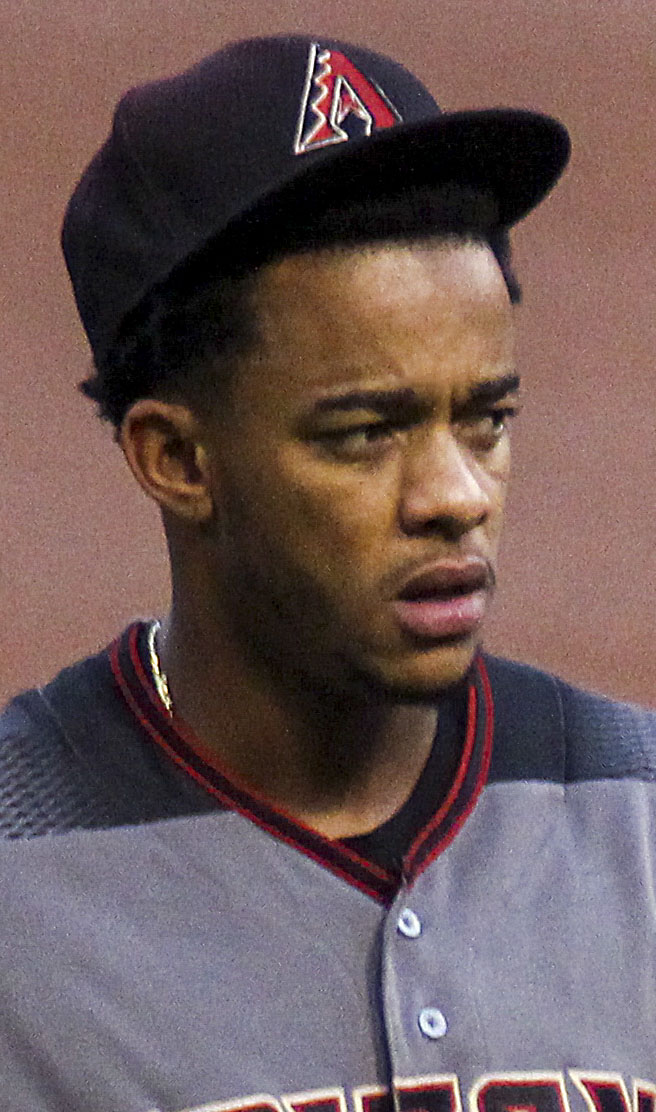
Ketel Marte, the most recent Taco Hero

Year	Player	Team	Game and inning	Ref.
2007	Jacoby Ellsbury	Boston Red Sox	Game 2, 4th inning	
2008	Jason Bartlett	Tampa Bay Rays	Game 1, 5th inning	
2012	Ángel Pagán	San Francisco Giants	Game 2, 8th inning	
2015	Lorenzo Cain	Kansas City Royals	Game 1, 6th inning	
2016	Francisco Lindor	Cleveland Indians	Game 1, 1st inning	
2017	Cameron Maybin	Houston Astros	Game 2, 11th inning	
2018	Mookie Betts	Boston Red Sox	Game 1, 1st inning	
2019	Trea Turner	Washington Nationals	Game 1, 1st inning	
2020	Mookie Betts	Los Angeles Dodgers	Game 1, 5th inning	
2021	Ozzie Albies	Atlanta Braves	Game 1, 1st inning	
2022	Kyle Schwarber	Philadelphia Phillies	Game 1, 7th inning	
2023	Ketel Marte	Arizona Diamondbacks	Game 1, 3rd inning	

== Related promotions ==
MLB's FanFest, held before the All-Star Game between 2010 and 2013, included an attraction for young fans called "Steal a Base, Steal a Taco". Fans could run between bases on a simulated field, then receive a voucher for a free taco.

During the 2019 MLB London Series, Taco Bell's restaurants in the United Kingdom offered free tacos if a player for either team stole a base.

In the NBA Finals, Taco Bell formerly ran a promotion called "Steal a Game, Steal a Taco", whereby if the away team won any of the first three games, the company would give away tacos on a designated day. The Golden State Warriors successfully triggered the giveaway during both the 2018 and 2019 championship series. The promotion was later altered and renamed "NBA Comebacks", whereby if a team losing at halftime comes back to win a game, customers can claim a free taco. During the 2021 NBA Finals, the Milwaukee Bucks came back from a 47–42 halftime deficit to win Game 6, 105–98, and Taco Bell offered free tacos to their customers.
