= NHL on NBC ratings =

US Ice Hockey broadcast ratings

The following is an overview of the television ratings for the NBC's National Hockey League telecasts.

== 2005–2009 ==
=== 2005–06 season ===
==== 2005–06 regular season ====
NBC earned a 1.5/3 overnight Nielsen rating for its first week of NHL action in the 2005–2006 season. The regional coverage was down 11.8% from a 1.7/4 for the first week of NHL on ABC in 2004. NBC's regional coverage of New York Rangers–Detroit Red Wings to 35% of the country earned a 1.4/3 overnight rating. The game earned a 1.3/3 in New York and a 7.8/17 in Detroit. The NHL on NBC got only an 0.7 rating on April 8, 2006, or 803,000 households.

==== 2006 Stanley Cup playoffs ====
When NBC went head-to-head with The NBA on ABC on May 7, 2006, ABC got a 4.3 (500.8 million households) rating whereas NBC got a 0.9 (693,000 households) rating. The first round of ratings for the 2006 playoffs on NBC were down between 13% and 19% from two years earlier on ABC, and the regular season ratings were more dismal still. The May 13, 2006, Carolina–New Jersey game on a Saturday afternoon had fewer viewers than the surfing competition that was its lead-in. More people watched a poker event that particular weekend than watched that hockey game. NBC's 1.1 average rating for the 2006 NHL playoffs was 21% lower than ABC's pre-lockout average of 1.4 in 2003–04.

Still, NBC claimed in May 2006 that the ratings were about what it expected, and that it would turn a profit on its NHL coverage for the 2005–06 season. Thus, the NHL also stood to gain money on the deal.

==== 2006 Stanley Cup Final ====
For Game 3 of the 2006 Stanley Cup Final, NBC got a 1.7 overnight rating, with one point equaling 1% of the United States' 77 million overnight television households. That was down from a 2.0 for Game 3 of the 2004 Stanley Cup Final. Out of four television networks (NBC, ABC, CBS, and Fox) broadcasting programming on Saturday, June 10, NBC came in dead last. Game 3 of the Stanley Cup Final earned a mere 2.88 million viewers, and a 1.1/ 4 among adults 18–49 from 8–11 p.m. Game 4 (June 12) earned NBC another fourth-place finish (technically, fifth place if the season premiere of The Closer on TNT is counted). Game 4 got a 2.6 rating (with a 1.5 in the 18–49 demo) with only 3.85 million viewers. Game 7 earned NBC a 3.3 rating and 6 share. That was down by 21% from Game 7 in 2004—the last season before the lockout. In 2004, the Tampa Bay Lightning's Game 7 victory over the Calgary Flames had a 4.2 rating and a 7 share on ABC. It was at or near the top in all coveted television viewer demographics.

In all, the five Stanley Cup Final games that NBC aired averaged a 2.3 rating and 4 share. That's down by 12% from a 2.6/5 on ABC in 2004. In addition, NBC averaged 3.6 million viewers, which was down by 8% from ABC's 3.9 million in 2004.

=== 2006–07 season ===
- The first week of action on NBC (1/13 at 2:00) (posted a 1.1 rating, down from the 1.7 from 2005 to 2006's opening week, but on par with The NHL on NBC's 2005–06 average.
- Week 2 (1/28 at 3:30), with a move to Sundays, produced a 1.3 rating for three games despite facing steep competition from the NBA and golf action featuring Tiger Woods.
- Week 3 of The NHL on NBC (2/11 at 3:30) drew a 0.9 overnight rating with a 2 share, lower than the rating for CBS' presentation of Amp'd Mobile AMA Supercross and bull riding on NBC.
- Week 4 (2/18 at 3:30) featuring Pittsburgh's Sidney Crosby facing Washington's Alexander Ovechkin drew a 1.0 overnight rating, beaten in its 3:30–6:00 p.m. timeslot by ABC's presentation of figure skating (1.7).
- Week 5 (3/4 at 12:30) featuring Colorado/Detroit and Pittsburgh/Philadelphia drew the best overnight rating of the season (1.3/3) on NBC in its earliest timeslot. Unlike previous weeks, when hockey had to compete against NASCAR, the NBA and golf, the only competition was college basketball (Kentucky/Florida - 2.1/5) and the Arena Football League (1.2/3).
- Week 6 (3/11 at 12:30) featuring Boston/Detroit and Carolina/NY Rangers drew a par for the course 1.1 rating. Despite the dropoff in market size (with Carolina being featured), the NHL came close to the NBA game on the same day (Sacramento/Denver - 1.5).
- Week 7 (3/25 at 12:30) rode the Sidney Crosby bandwagon to another 1.1, despite airing a blowout game (Boston/Pittsburgh) in most of the country. Most of the U.S. was switched to the other game (Rangers/Islanders) by the third period. The NHL telecast on NBC drew a larger national audience than ABC's National Basketball Association telecast (Phoenix Suns–Sacramento Kings). Each network earned a 1.0 rating (percentage of households tuned in), but NBC pulled in a larger audience share (percentage of time that people spent watching the telecast), 3 compared with 2. In total viewership, NBC outdrew ABC 1.31 million to 1.26 million.
- Week 8 (4/01 at 12:30) NBC, with two weak regional matchups (Detroit–Columbus and Los Angeles–San Jose) slumped to a .71. That's the lowest rating for an NHL broadcast in years.

==== 2007 Stanley Cup playoffs ====
- In the second week of playoff coverage, Detroit's victory over Calgary had an overnight rating 1.3, while New Jersey's series victory over Tampa Bay earned .9.
- In the third week of playoff coverage, on Saturday NBC's national coverage of the San Jose–Detroit game on Saturday had a 1.0 large-market rating, down 9.1 percent from coverage of a New Jersey–Carolina game a year ago. The Rangers-Sabres telecast on Sunday drew a viewers in 1.3 percent of homes in the 56 largest U.S. media markets. In Buffalo, the ratings story is much different, where more than half of the TV sets in Western New York were tuned to the Sabres–Rangers game, breaking records previously held by the Buffalo Bills.
- In the fourth week of coverage, Game 5 of the Sharks–Red Wings semifinal series received a 1.4 overnight on Saturday, up 40% over last year's comparable game (Devils–Hurricanes). Game 6 between the Rangers and Sabres, leading into the Kentucky Derby, earned a 1.4 on Sunday. There was no comparable game last year. In Buffalo, the Sabres' series clinching victory earned a 32.6 rating and 60 share. That means 60 percent of the sets in use in Buffalo were watching the game.
- In week five of playoff coverage, the final game of the Sabres–Senators series on Saturday earned 1.2 overnight rating and a 3 share. Game 5 of the Ducks–Red Wings matchup on Sunday earned 1.6/4.

==== 2007 Stanley Cup Final ====
- According to Mediaweek, Game 3 of the NHL Stanley Cup Final on NBC (Games 1 and 2 were on Versus) received just 1.73 million viewers and a 0.5/ 2 among adults 18–49 in prime time.
- According to Mediaweek, Game 5 of the Stanley Cup Final on NBC received 3.02 million viewers and a 1.2/ 3 among adults 18–49 in prime time. The year-ago Stanley Cup match-up scored 3.13 million viewers and a 1.3/ 4 in the demo, based on the final nationals on June 12, 2006.
- According to Mediaweek, Game 5 of the Stanley Cup Final (Ottawa vs. Anaheim) earned a 2.1/ 3 in prime time. Comparably, that was 25 percent below the year-ago overnight series average for the Stanley Cup Final (2.8/ 4 in 2006).

=== 2007–08 season ===
On New Years Day 2008, the NHL hosted an outdoor game that featured the Buffalo Sabres vs. the Pittsburgh Penguins at Ralph Wilson Stadium in Buffalo, New York. The game received a 2.6 Nielsen rating, the highest since the NHL debut on Fox over ten years prior.

The second week of coverage featured the Boston Bruins against the New York Rangers, the game got a 1.1 rating (12 p.m. start).

The NHL signed an agreement in 2008 to extend the NHL on NBC to the 2008–2009 season. Ratings for the 2007–2008 season rose 11 percent from the previous year. The Detroit–Pittsburgh matchup returned the Stanley Cup Final's television ratings to close to pre-lockout levels.

The four games on NBC averaged a 3.2 rating and a 6 share, the highest since Carolina–Detroit in 2002 averaged a 3.6.

The average rating doubled last year's record low of 1.6.

Game 6 of the Stanley Cup Final averaged a 4.0 national rating and a 7 share, a 111 percent increase over the last Game 6 in 2006, when Edmonton–Carolina drew a 1.9.

=== 2008-09 season ===
The 2009 NHL Winter Classic , played on January 1 at Wrigley Field in Chicago between the Detroit Red Wings and the Chicago Blackhawks, drew a 2.9 overnight rating and a 6 share on NBC, representing a 12 percent improvement over the inaugural 2008 Winter Classic. The overnight figure was the strongest for an NHL regular season broadcast in nearly 13 years, surpassing a February 1996 Fox regional broadcast that had drawn a 3.0 rating.

Game 7 of the 2009 Stanley Cup Final between the Pittsburgh Penguins and the Detroit Red Wings drew a 4.3 rating and an eight share on NBC, averaging eight million viewers in the United States. According to Sports Media Watch, the broadcast was the most-viewed NHL telecast in the country since 1973.

== 2010s ==
=== 2009–10 season ===
Ratings for the 2010 NHL Winter Classic drew a 2.6 overnight rating, roughly even with the 2008 contest and down from 2009. This was eventually revised downward to a 2.1 rating.

Game 2 of the 2010 Stanley Cup Final drew a 4.1 overnight rating and a 7 share, the highest overnight rating since 1975.

=== 2010–11 season ===
The 2011 NHL Winter Classic, moved to prime time because of weather concerns, drew an audience of 4.5 million viewers and a rating of 2.3, both increases from the year before. The 1.8 rating among persons 18 to 49 was the highest of the broadcast networks in the time slot.

The Hockey Day in America broadcasts drew a 1.2 overnight rating, a slight increase from the 0.9 to 1.1 shares earned by most of the Sunday games that season.

Game one on NBC drew the best television ratings for a first game since game one of the 1999 Stanley Cup Final, drawing a 3.2 rating, up 14 percent from game one of the 2010 Stanley Cup Final. The rating was boosted by heavy interest in Boston's large market, which posted a 25.5/39, topping the 19.1/34 for game one of the 2010 NBA Finals between the Boston Celtics and the Los Angeles Lakers. In contrast, game two drew just 3.37 million viewers for NBC, making it the least-watched Stanley Cup Final broadcast on U.S. network television since game five in 2007, which also was the last time a Canadian team (the Ottawa Senators) advanced to the Cup Final. Game 7 was the highest rated NHL game on both sides of the border. In the US, the game drew a 5.7 rating and a 10 share, tied with Game 7 of the 2011 Stanley Cup Final pulling in a 43.4 rating in Boston alone.``

=== 2011–12 season ===
The 2012 Stanley Cup Final rated poorly in comparison to the four most recent Stanley Cup Final on United States television. The first four games were marred by low ratings; had the series ended in four games, this series would have produced the lowest television ratings ever for a championship series of any major league sport. However, Game 5 and Game 6 produced somewhat higher ratings than the first four games, which gave the 2012 Final a slightly higher rating than the 2007 Final (which was on par with the 2006 Final); the 2007 Final therefore remains the lowest-rated championship series in American television history.

| Game | American audience (in millions) | Canadian audience (in millions) |
|---|---|---|
| 1 | 2.90 | 2.13 |
| 2 | 2.94 | 2.57 |
| 3 | 1.74 | 2.16 |
| 4 | 2.07 | 3.01 |
| 5 | 3.33 | 3.11 |
| 6 | 4.93 | 3.13 |

=== 2012–13 season ===
The NBC Sports Group's coverage in the United States was different from previous seasons: the NBC broadcast network televised game one and then the final four games, while the NBC Sports Network broadcast games two and three.

U.S. Ratings
| Game | NBC/NBCSN viewership (in millions) |
|---|---|
| 1 | 6.358 |
| 2 | 3.964 |
| 3 | 4.001 |
| 4 | 6.459 |
| 5 | 5.632 |
| 6 | 8.160 |

=== 2014–15 season ===
This was the second-most watched Stanley Cup Final on U.S. television since 1995, trailing only the 2013 Stanley Cup Final, with an average 3.2 Nielsen rating and 5.6 million viewers on NBC and NBCSN. Game six was seen by 7.6 million viewers nationally on NBC. Ratings for game six were especially strong in Chicago and Tampa Bay: it was the most-watched NHL broadcast locally in Chicago history, and the second-highest in Tampa Bay. By contrast, ratings in Canada dropped significantly, making it the lowest-rated Stanley Cup Final since 2009. Game six, facing competition from a Team Canada match in the 2015 FIFA Women's World Cup, and the Toronto Blue Jays (which had seen increased ratings due to a major winning streak), was the lowest-rated deciding NHL playoff game on Canadian television since the 2003 Stanley Cup Final.

U.S. Ratings
| Game | Network | Ratings (households) | American audience (in millions) |
|---|---|---|---|
| 1 | NBC | 3.3 | 5.547 |
| 2 | NBC | 3.9 | 6.549 |
| 3 | NBCSN | 2.2 | 3.896 |
| 4 | NBCSN | 2.2 | 3.914 |
| 5 | NBC | 3.0 | 5.260 |
| 6 | NBC | 4.4 | 8.005 |

== NBCSN ratings ==
| Season | Avg. Viewers | Change | Ref |
|---|---|---|---|
| 2010–11 | 348,000 | — | |
| 2011–12 | 332,000 | –5% | |
| 2012–13* | 392,000 | +18% | |
| 2013–14 | 351,000 | –10% | |
| 2014–15 | 349,000 | –1% | |
| 2015–16 | 378,000 | +8% | |
| 2016–17 | 336,000 | –11% | |
| 2017–18 | 302,000 | –12% | |
| 2018–19 | 313,000 | +4% | |
| 2019–20* | 309,000 | –1% | |

Note: The 2012–13 season was a lockout shortened season.

Note: The 2019–20 season was mostly completed (COVID-19 shortened). NBCSN average was not released. Total NBC/NBCSN viewership was 398,0000 viewers down 6% from 424,000 in the 18–19 season.

== See also ==
- NHL on NBC
- Stanley Cup Final television ratings
- History of the NHL on U.S. television
