= NBA Finals television ratings =

List of television ratings NBA Finals in the United States

This is a list of television ratings for NBA Finals in the United States, based on Nielsen viewing data.

The highest rated and most watched NBA Finals series was the 1998 NBA Finals between the Chicago Bulls and Utah Jazz, which averaged an 18.7 rating / 33 share and 29.04 million viewers on NBC. That series also featured the highest rated and most watched NBA Finals game, as the Sunday night averaged a 22.3 rating / 38 share and 35.89 million viewers. The 1987 NBA Finals between the Los Angeles Lakers and Boston Celtics was the highest rated and most watched NBA Finals series on CBS, averaging a 15.9 rating / 32 share and 24.12 million viewers. Game 7 of the 1988 NBA Finals registered the network's highest rated and most watched NBA game with a 21.2 rating / 37 share.

The 2015 NBA Finals between the Golden State Warriors and Cleveland Cavaliers was the highest rated NBA Finals series on ABC averaging an 11.6 rating / 21 share and 19.94 million viewers. The 2026 NBA Finals between New York Knicks and San Antonio Spurs was the most watched NBA Final series on ABC averaging a 9.4 rating / 31 share and 20.58 million viewers. Game 7 of the 2016 NBA Finals registered the network's highest rated and most watched NBA game with an average 15.8 rating / 29 share and 31.02 million viewers. It was the first basketball game to draw more than 30 million average viewers in 18 years, and only the seventh non-NFL sports telecast (excluding the Olympics) to have done so since 1998.

The 2019 NBA Finals between the Golden State Warriors and the Toronto Raptors had a drop in American viewership however combined North American viewership. Analysts cited the presence of a Canadian team (Canadian viewership does not count towards U.S. Nielsen ratings, leading to only one U.S. home market being reflected in viewership), as a factor in the drop. At the same time, the presence of the Toronto Raptors in the NBA Finals boosted Canadian viewership to record levels.

For the 2020 NBA Finals, the ratings dropped to a historic low, with one of the games drawing only 5.1 million viewers. The average viewers figure over 6 games was 7.5 million, which is a 51% decline from the previous year. Some have claimed this was due to the players' political activism; others have claimed this was due to the finals being played out of season caused by the COVID-19 pandemic, as other sports such as the NHL playoffs and the MLB playoffs also showed a significant decline in ratings.

== Viewership/rating by year ==
View source data.

== Single game superlatives (1987–present) ==
=== Highest rated ===
1. 1998 Game 6 – 22.3
1. 1988 Game 7 – 21.5
2. 1993 Game 6 – 20.3

=== Lowest rated ===
1. 2020 Game 3 – 3.1
2. 2020 Game 2 – 3.6
3. 2020 Game 1 – 4.1

=== Most watched ===
1. 1998 Game 6 – 35.856 million
2. 1993 Game 6 – 32.100 million
3. 2016 Game 7 – 31.02 million

=== Least watched ===
1. 2020 Game 3 – 5.94 million*
2. 2020 Game 2 – 6.61 million*
3. 2020 Game 1 – 7.41 million*

== Game-by-game breakdown by year (1974–present) ==
Figures are expressed as Rating/Share. Rating represents the percentage of US TV households that watched the game, Share represents the percentage of TV sets in use that were tuned to the game. Note that game-by-game viewership for pre-2000 series were generally unavailable.

Key to colors
Most viewers for each Game (1 through 7) or Average
Fewest viewers for each Game (1 through 7) or Average

Year	Network	Results	Avg	Game 1	Game 2	Game 3	Game 4	Game 5	Game 6	Game 7
2026	ABC	New York Knicks 4, San Antonio Spurs 1	9.4/31 (20.58M Viewers)	8.2/27 (16.93M Viewers)	7.7/27 (16.43M Viewers)	10.9/34 (23.79M Viewers)	10.1/33 (20.94M Viewers)	10.3/33 (24.54M Viewers)	No Game	
2025	ABC	Oklahoma City Thunder 4, Indiana Pacers 3	5.1 (10.27M Viewers)	4.7 (8.91M Viewers)	4.5 (8.76M Viewers)	4.8 (9.19M Viewers)	4.6 (9.40M Viewers)	4.9 (9.54M Viewers)	4.8 (9.28M Viewers)	7.6 (16.35M Viewers)
2024	ABC	Boston Celtics 4, Dallas Mavericks 1	5.8 (11.31M Viewers)	5.7 (10.99M Viewers)	6.2 (12.31M Viewers)	6.0 (12.43M Viewers)	4.7 (9.62M Viewers)	6.3 (12.22M Viewers)	No Game	
2023	ABC	Denver Nuggets 4, Miami Heat 1	6.1 (11.64M Viewers)	6.0 (11.58M Viewers)	6.0 (11.91M Viewers)	6.0 (11.24M Viewers)	5.4 (10.41M Viewers)	7.0 (13.08M Viewers)	No Game	
2022	ABC	Golden State Warriors 4, Boston Celtics 2	6.6 (12.40M Viewers)	6.4 (11.90M Viewers)	6.2 (11.91M Viewers)	6.2 (11.52M Viewers)	6.2 (12.06M Viewers)	7.0 (13.03M Viewers)	7.5 (13.99M Viewers)	No Game
2021	ABC	Milwaukee Bucks 4, Phoenix Suns 2	5.2 (9.91M Viewers)	4.5 (8.56M Viewers)	5.1 (9.38M Viewers)	4.7 (9.02M Viewers)	5.3 (10.25M Viewers)	4.8 (9.55M Viewers)	6.6 (12.52M Viewers)	No Game
2020	ABC	Los Angeles Lakers 4, Miami Heat 2	4.0 (7.45M Viewers)	4.1 (7.41M Viewers)	3.6 (6.61M Viewers)	3.1 (5.94M Viewers)	4.4 (7.54M Viewers)	4.8 (8.89M Viewers)	4.2 (8.29M Viewers)	No Game
2019 (Note: For Canadian viewership numbers, see 2019 NBA Finals § Viewership.)	ABC	Toronto Raptors 4, Golden State Warriors 2	8.8 (15.14M Viewers)	7.9 (13.51M Viewers)	8.0 (14.05M Viewers)	7.8 (13.44M Viewers)	7.6 (13.16M Viewers)	10.6 (18.34M Viewers)	10.7 (18.34M Viewers)	No Game
2018	ABC	Golden State Warriors 4, Cleveland Cavaliers 0	10.0 (17.56M Viewers)	10.0 (17.67M Viewers)	10.3 (18.47M Viewers)	10.4 (17.85M Viewers)	9.3 (16.24M Viewers)	No Game		
2017	ABC	Golden State Warriors 4, Cleveland Cavaliers 1	11.3/22 (20.38M Viewers)	10.5/20 (18.70M Viewers)	10.7/20 (19.69M Viewers)	11.3/21 (20.05M Viewers)	10.7/22 (19.01M Viewers)	13.5/25 (24.47M Viewers)	No Game	
2016	ABC	Cleveland Cavaliers 4, Golden State Warriors 3	11.4/21 (20.28M Viewers)	11.1/20 (19.20M Viewers)	9.8/17 (17.49M Viewers)	9.7/18 (16.47M Viewers)	9.8/19 (16.57M Viewers)	11.8/21 (20.53M Viewers)	11.8/22 (20.70M Viewers)	15.8/29 (31.02M viewers)
2015	ABC	Golden State Warriors 4, Cleveland Cavaliers 2	11.6/21 (19.94M Viewers)	10.6/20 (17.77M Viewers)	10.8/19 (19.17M Viewers)	11.1/20 (18.77M Viewers)	11.7/21 (19.84M Viewers)	11.8/21 (20.86M Viewers)	13.4/24 (23.25M Viewers)	No Game
2014	ABC	San Antonio Spurs 4, Miami Heat 1	9.3/16 (15.54M Viewers)	9.0/15 (14.85M Viewers)	9.0/15 (15.13M Viewers)	9.0/15 (14.78M Viewers)	9.3/15 (14.96M Viewers)	10.3/18 (18.00M Viewers)	No Game	
2013	ABC	Miami Heat 4, San Antonio Spurs 3	10.4/17 (17.47M Viewers)	8.8/14 (14.24M Viewers)	8.5/15 (14.57M Viewers)	8.5/14 (14.05M Viewers)	10.0/16 (16.23M Viewers)	9.5/16 (16.27M Viewers)	12.3/21 (20.64M Viewers)	15.3/26 (26.32M Viewers)
2012	ABC	Miami Heat 4, Oklahoma City Thunder 1	10.1/17 (16.88M Viewers)	9.9/16 (16.20M Viewers)	10.4/17 (16.67M Viewers)	8.8/16 (15.55M Viewers)	10.5/18 (17.50M Viewers)	10.9/18 (18.46M Viewers)	No Game	
2011	ABC	Dallas Mavericks 4, Miami Heat 2	10.2/17 (17.39M Viewers)	9.0/15 (15.17M Viewers)	9.3/15 (15.52M Viewers)	9.1/15 (15.34M Viewers)	9.6/16 (16.13M Viewers)	10.8/18 (18.32M Viewers)	13.3/23 (23.88M Viewers)	No Game
2010	ABC	Los Angeles Lakers 4, Boston Celtics 3	10.6/18 (18.14M Viewers)	8.6/14 (14.09M Viewers)	9.2/15 (15.72M Viewers)	9.6/16 (15.96M Viewers)	9.9/18 (16.37M Viewers)	10.8/18 (18.65M Viewers)	10.4/18 (17.96M Viewers)	15.6/27 (28.20M Viewers)
2009	ABC	Los Angeles Lakers 4, Orlando Magic 1	8.4/15 (14.35M Viewers)	7.8/14 (13.04M Viewers)	8.2/14 (14.06M Viewers)	8.6/15 (14.20M Viewers)	9.4/17 (15.96M Viewers)	8.0/14 (14.17M Viewers)	No Game	
2008	ABC	Boston Celtics 4, Los Angeles Lakers 2	9.3/17 (14.94M Viewers)	8.7/16 (13.38M Viewers)	8.5/15 (13.50M Viewers)	9.2/16 (14.51M Viewers)	8.7/16 (13.76M Viewers)	10.2/19 (16.88M Viewers)	10.7/19 (17.39M Viewers)	No Game
2007	ABC	San Antonio Spurs 4, Cleveland Cavaliers 0	6.2/11 (9.29M Viewers)	6.3/11 (9.21M Viewers)	5.6/10 (8.55M Viewers)	6.4/11 (9.49M Viewers)	6.5/12 (9.91M Viewers)	No Game		
2006	ABC	Miami Heat 4, Dallas Mavericks 2	8.5/15 (12.97M Viewers)	7.8/14 (11.51M Viewers)	8.0/14 (12.41M Viewers)	8.0/14 (12.25M Viewers)	7.8/14 (11.56M Viewers)	9.1/17 (14.32M Viewers)	10.1/18 (15.71M Viewers)	No Game
2005	ABC	San Antonio Spurs 4, Detroit Pistons 3	8.2/15 (12.54M Viewers)	7.2/13 (10.57M Viewers)	6.9/12 (10.66M Viewers)	7.2/13 (10.63M Viewers)	7.2/13 (10.92M Viewers)	8.4/15 (13.09M Viewers)	8.8/15 (13.47M Viewers)	11.9/22 (19.00M Viewers)
2004	ABC	Detroit Pistons 4, Los Angeles Lakers 1	11.5/20 (17.94M Viewers)	9.8/17 (15.36M Viewers)	10.7/19 (16.13M Viewers)	10.5/19 (16.21M Viewers)	12.7/22 (20.30M Viewers)	13.8/23 (21.84M Viewers)	No Game	
2003	ABC	San Antonio Spurs 4, New Jersey Nets 2	6.5/12 (9.86M Viewers)	6.4/11 (9.60M Viewers)	5.2/10 (8.06M Viewers)	7.0/12 (10.76M Viewers)	6.6/12 (9.66M Viewers)	6.2/12 (9.31M Viewers)	7.5/14 (11.57M Viewers)	No Game
2002	NBC	Los Angeles Lakers 4, New Jersey Nets 0	10.2/19 (15.68M Viewers)	10.6/20 (15.85M Viewers)	9.1/18 (14.05M Viewers)	10.2/18 (16.21M Viewers)	10.8/19 (16.56M Viewers)	No Game		
2001	NBC	Los Angeles Lakers 4, Philadelphia 76ers 1	12.1/23 (19.00M Viewers)	12.4/23 (18.58M Viewers)	11.6/22 (18.72M Viewers)	12.7/23 (20.28M Viewers)	12.6/23 (19.97M Viewers)	11.2/22 (17.36M Viewers)	No Game	
2000	NBC	Los Angeles Lakers 4, Indiana Pacers 2	11.6/21 (17.40M Viewers)	10.5/18 (10.56M Households)	9.9/20 (10.02M Households)	10.7/19 (10.84M Households)	13.1/24 (13.17M Households)	10.0/20 (10.04M Households)	14.7/26 (14.85M Households)	No Game
1999	NBC	San Antonio Spurs 4, New York Knicks 1	11.3/21 (16.01M Viewers)	11.5/20 (16.57M Viewers)	9.6/19 (13.98M Viewers)	12.1/21 (17.01M Viewers)	12.0/22 (16.76M Viewers)	11.0/22 (15.53M Viewers)	No Game	
1998	NBC	Chicago Bulls 4, Utah Jazz 2	18.7/33 (29.04M Viewers)	18.0/32 (26.70M Viewers)	16.6/31 (26.30M Viewers)	16.2/28 (15.8M Households)	19.1/33 (18.7M Households)	19.8/37 (30.60M Viewers)	22.3/38 (35.89M Viewers)	No Game
1997	NBC	Chicago Bulls 4, Utah Jazz 2	16.8/30 (25.59M Viewers)	15.8/27 (15.3M Households)	15.1/27 (14.6M Households)	14.2/27 (13.7M Households)	16.9/30 (16.4M Households)	20.1/35 (19.5M Households)	18.5/35 (17.9M Households)	No Game
1996	NBC	Chicago Bulls 4, Seattle SuperSonics 2	16.7/31 (24.86M Viewers)	16.8/31 (16.1M Households)	13.9/27 (13.3M Households)	15.8/28 (15.2M Households)	18.1/33 (17.4M Households)	17.2/33 (16.5M Households)	18.8/35 (18.0M Households)	No Game
1995	NBC	Houston Rockets 4, Orlando Magic 0	13.9/25 (20.10M Viewers)	14.7/26 (14.0M Households)	12.0/23 (11.4M Households)	14.1/25 (13.4M Households)	14.9/26 (14.2M Households)	No Game		
1994	NBC	Houston Rockets 4, New York Knicks 3	12.3/23 (17.25M Viewers)	12.6/23 (11.9M Households)	10.7/21 (10.1M Households)	12.4/24 (11.7M Households)	12.9/23 (12.1M Households)	7.8/14 (coverage affected by O.J. Simpson's Bronco Chase)	11.3/24 (10.6M Households)	17.9/31 (16.9M Households)
1993	NBC	Chicago Bulls 4, Phoenix Suns 2	17.9/33 (27.21M Viewers)	16.8/29 (15.6M Households)	14.6/29 (13.6M Households)	17.0/32 (15.8M Households)	19.8/35 (18.4M Households)	19.0/36 (17.7M Households)	20.3/39 (32.10M Viewers)	No Game
1992	NBC	Chicago Bulls 4, Portland Trail Blazers 2	14.2/27 (20.84M Viewers)	13.5/25 (12.4M Households)	13.7/26 (12.6M Households)	13.6/26 (12.5M Households)	16.0/29 (14.7M Households)	13.9/28 (12.8M Households)	14.7/29 (13.5M Households)	No Game
1991	NBC	Chicago Bulls 4, Los Angeles Lakers 1	15.8/34 (23.91M Viewers)	12.6	16.1/29 (15.0M Households)	15.7/31 (14.6M Households)	15.2/30 (14.2M Households)	19.7/36 (18.3M Households)	No Game	
1990	CBS	Detroit Pistons 4, Portland Trail Blazers 1	12.3/25 (17.19M Viewers)	11.8	12.2	10.8	13.4	13.2	No Game	
1989	CBS	Detroit Pistons 4, Los Angeles Lakers 0	15.1/30 (21.26M Viewers)	14.0	15.6	13.2	17.4	No Game		
1988	CBS	Los Angeles Lakers 4, Detroit Pistons 3	15.4/31 (21.70M Viewers)	13.9	14.8	12.0	14.8	16.1	14.4	21.2/37
1987	CBS	Los Angeles Lakers 4, Boston Celtics 2	15.9/32 (24.12M Viewers)	13.8	14.6	11.9	18.9	18.9	17.3	No Game
1986	CBS	Boston Celtics 4, Houston Rockets 2	14.1/31 (14.43M Households)	9.9	14.8	13.4	15.4	16.9	14.2	No Game
1985	CBS	Los Angeles Lakers 4, Boston Celtics 2	13.5/30	---	14.3	---	17.0	15.3	15.3	No Game
1984	CBS	Boston Celtics 4, Los Angeles Lakers 3	12.1/26	---	12.3	---	13.1	12.1	---	19.3
1983	CBS	Philadelphia 76ers 4, Los Angeles Lakers 0	12.3/26	---	12.9/23	---	---	No Game		
1982	CBS	Los Angeles Lakers 4, Philadelphia 76ers 2	13.0/28							
1981	CBS	Boston Celtics 4, Houston Rockets 2	6.7/27							
1980	CBS	Los Angeles Lakers 4, Philadelphia 76ers 2	8.0/29							
1979	CBS	Seattle SuperSonics 4, Washington Bullets 1	7.2/24							
1978	CBS	Washington Bullets 4, Seattle SuperSonics 3	9.9/25							
1977	CBS	Portland Trail Blazers 4, Philadelphia 76ers 2	12.7/33							
1976	CBS	Boston Celtics 4, Phoenix Suns 2	11.5/29							
1975	CBS	Golden State Warriors 4, Washington Bullets 0	10.1/28 (11.38M Viewers)							
1974	CBS	Boston Celtics 4, Milwaukee Bucks 3	13.5/32							

== See also ==
- Super Bowl television ratings
- Stanley Cup Finals television ratings
- World Series television ratings
- MLS Cup television ratings
