= Super Bowl television ratings =

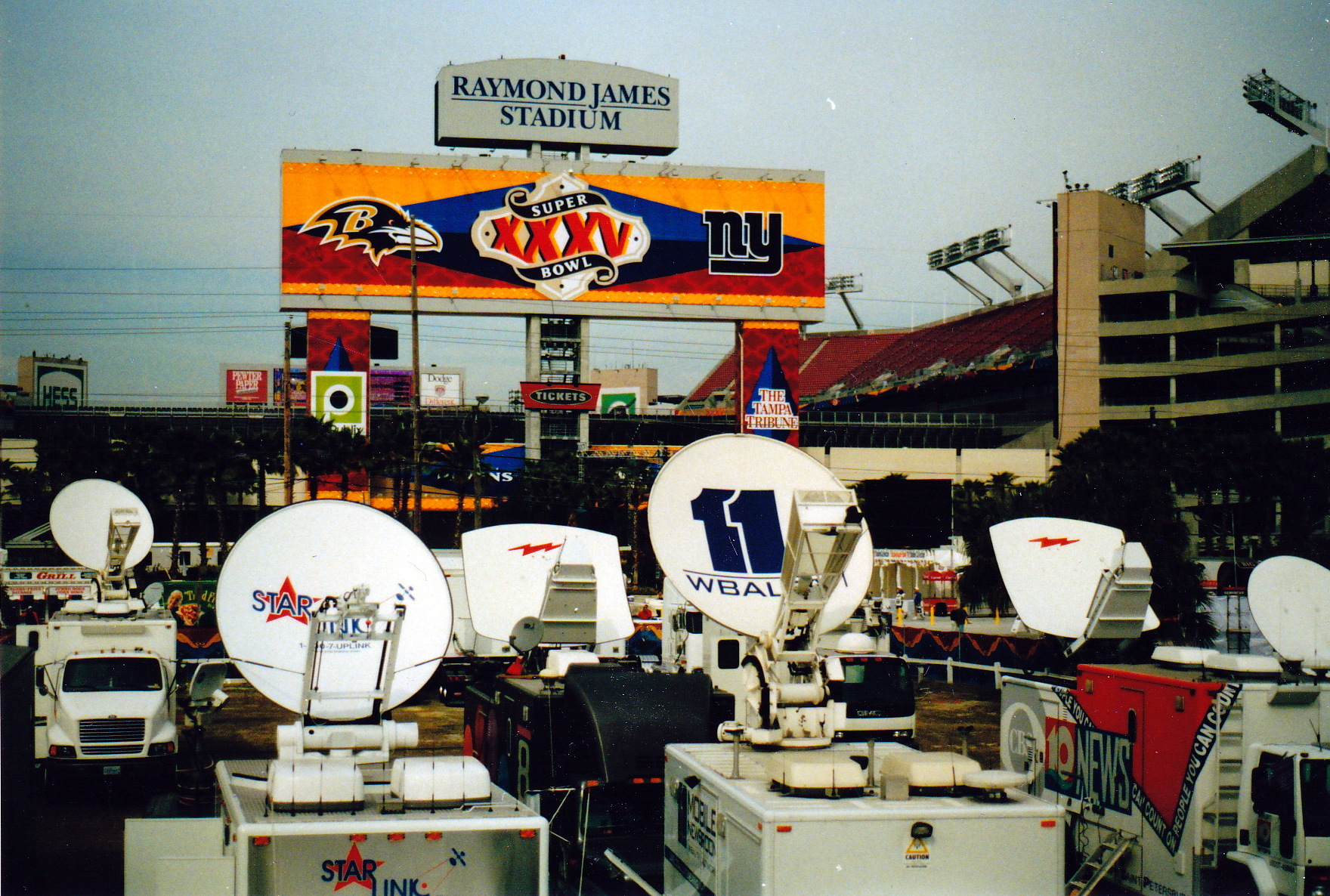
Satellite trucks broadcasting from Super Bowl XXXV. The game was watched by more than 84 million people in the United States.

Super Bowl television ratings have traditionally been high. One of the most watched annual sporting events in the world, the NFL's championship game is broadcast in over 130 countries in more than 30 languages. Viewership is predominantly North American; the Super Bowl is the most watched television broadcast in the United States every year.

== United States ==
=== English ===

The Super Bowl is noted for its enduring ratings. While viewership for prime time series and other annual events such as the Academy Awards has declined over time, viewership of the Super Bowl has remained stable. In fact, the Super Bowl is the American sports broadcast with the most consistent ratings, and draws substantially higher ratings than other sports events, including the NBA Finals and World Series.

Ratings for the Super Bowl first peaked from 1977 to 1987, when no less than 44.4% of American households with television sets would watch. From the late 2000s to mid-2010s, ratings peaked again—viewership grew for all but one broadcast from 2006 to 2015. This was attributed to the NFL's broadened appeal to female and Hispanic audiences, as well as the league's ability to prop up "high-profile" players in the media; female viewership grew every year from 2003 to 2008. However, the 2019 game became the least-watched in more than a decade and the household rating for the Super Bowl declined for the fourth consecutive year.

Super Bowl XVI in 1982 remains the highest-rated Super Bowl broadcast; it earned a 49.1 household rating. The viewership record belongs to Super Bowl LIX in 2025, which was watched by an estimated 127.7 million people.

List of Super Bowl television ratings in the United States with selected figures
Super Bowl	Date	Network	Avg. viewers (millions)	Avg. Halftime Show Viewers (millions)	Households		18–49 demographic		Avg. cost of 30-second ad	
Super Bowl	Date	Network	Avg. viewers (millions)	Avg. Halftime Show Viewers (millions)	Rating	Share	Rating	Share	Original	2025 inflation- adjusted
I	January 15, 1967	CBS	26.75		22.6	43	Unknown	Unknown	$42,500	$410,367
I	January 15, 1967	NBC	24.43		18.5	36	Unknown	Unknown	$37,500	$362,088
II	January 14, 1968	CBS	39.12		36.8	68	Unknown	Unknown	$54,500	$504,581
III	January 12, 1969	NBC	41.66		36.0	70	Unknown	Unknown	$55,000	$482,872
IV	January 11, 1970	CBS	44.27		39.4	69	Unknown	Unknown	$78,200	$648,316
V	January 17, 1971	NBC	46.04		39.9	75	Unknown	Unknown	$72,500	$576,366
VI	January 16, 1972	CBS	56.64		44.2	74	Unknown	Unknown	$86,100	$662,703
VII	January 14, 1973	NBC	53.32		42.7	72	Unknown	Unknown	$88,100	$638,956
VIII	January 13, 1974	CBS	51.70		41.6	73	Unknown	Unknown	$103,500	$675,683
IX	January 12, 1975	NBC	56.05		42.4	72	Unknown	Unknown	$107,000	$640,213
X	January 18, 1976	CBS	57.71		42.3	78	Unknown	Unknown	$110,000	$622,368
XI	January 9, 1977	NBC	62.05		44.4	73	Unknown	Unknown	$125,000	$664,127
XII	January 15, 1978	CBS	78.94		47.2	67	Unknown	Unknown	$162,300	$801,149
XIII	January 21, 1979	NBC	74.74		47.1	74	Unknown	Unknown	$185,000	$820,667
XIV	January 20, 1980	CBS	76.24		46.3	67	Unknown	Unknown	$222,000	$867,468
XV	January 25, 1981	NBC	68.29		44.4	63	Unknown	Unknown	$275,000	$973,874
XVI	January 24, 1982	CBS	85.24		49.1	73	Unknown	Unknown	$324,300	$1,081,932
XVII	January 30, 1983	NBC	81.77		48.6	69	Unknown	Unknown	$400,000	$1,293,017
XVIII	January 22, 1984	CBS	77.62		46.4	71	Unknown	Unknown	$368,200	$1,141,043
XIX	January 20, 1985	ABC	85.53		46.4	63	Unknown	Unknown	$525,000	$1,571,589
XX	January 26, 1986	NBC	92.57		48.3	70	Unknown	Unknown	$550,000	$1,615,437
XXI	January 25, 1987	CBS	87.19		45.8	66	Unknown	Unknown	$600,000	$1,700,351
XXII	January 31, 1988	ABC	80.14		41.9	62	Unknown	Unknown	$645,000	$1,755,874
XXIII	January 22, 1989	NBC	81.59		43.5	68	Unknown	Unknown	$675,000	$1,753,188
XXIV	January 28, 1990	CBS	73.85		39.0	63	Unknown	Unknown	$700,400	$1,726,024
XXV	January 27, 1991	ABC	79.51		41.9	63	Unknown	Unknown	$800,000	$1,891,033
XXVI	January 26, 1992	CBS	79.59		40.3	61	35.6	61	$850,000	$1,950,142
XXVII	January 31, 1993	NBC	90.99	133.4	45.1	66	Unknown	Unknown	$850,000	$1,894,437
XXVIII	January 30, 1994	NBC	90.00		45.5	66	39.9	76	$900,000	$1,954,984
XXIX	January 29, 1995	ABC	83.42		41.3	62	Unknown	Unknown	$1,150,000	$2,429,843
XXX	January 28, 1996	NBC	94.08		46.0	68	41.2	Unknown	$1,085,000	$2,227,323
XXXI	January 26, 1997	Fox	87.87		43.3	65	38.5	74	$1,200,000	$2,406,716
XXXII	January 25, 1998	NBC	90.00		44.5	67	38.7	75	$1,291,100	$2,550,305
XXXIII	January 31, 1999	Fox	83.72		40.2	61	36.4	71	$1,600,000	$3,092,289
XXXIV	January 30, 2000	ABC	88.47		43.3	63	37.9	70	$2,100,000	$3,926,087
XXXV	January 28, 2001	CBS	84.34		40.4	61	35.8	71	$2,200,000	$4,000,188
XXXVI	February 3, 2002	Fox	86.80		40.4	61	34.7	70	$2,200,000	$3,938,020
XXXVII	January 26, 2003	ABC	88.64		40.7	61	36.4	70	$2,200,000	$3,850,398
XXXVIII	February 1, 2004	CBS	89.80		41.4	63	35.7	72	$2,302,200	$3,924,205
XXXIX	February 6, 2005	Fox	86.07		41.1	62	33.2	68	$2,400,000	$3,956,381
XL	February 5, 2006	ABC	90.75	89.90	41.6	62	34.6	69	$2,500,000	$3,992,654
XLI	February 4, 2007	CBS	93.18		42.6	64	35.2	70	$2,385,365	$3,703,805
XLII	February 3, 2008	Fox	97.45		43.1	65	37.5	73	$2,699,963	$4,037,425
XLIII	February 1, 2009	NBC	98.73		42.0	64	36.7	72	$3,000,000	$4,502,094
XLIV	February 7, 2010	CBS	106.48		45.0	68	38.6	75	$2,800,000	$4,133,984
XLV	February 6, 2011	Fox	111.04	110.2	46.0	69	39.9	77	$2,948,649	$4,220,145
XLVI	February 5, 2012	NBC	111.35	114	47.0	71	40.5	78	$3,442,752	$4,828,037
XLVII	February 3, 2013	CBS	108.69	110.8	46.4	69	39.7	77	$3,765,130	$5,203,948
XLVIII	February 2, 2014	Fox	112.19	115.3	46.7	69	39.3	77	$4,084,864	$5,555,392
XLIX	February 1, 2015	NBC	114.44	121	47.5	71	39.1	79	$4,283,129	$5,817,671
50	February 7, 2016	CBS	111.86	115.5	46.6	72	37.7	79	$4,800,000	$6,439,268
LI	February 5, 2017	Fox	111.32	117.5	45.3	70	37.1	79	$5,399,873	$7,092,557
LII	February 4, 2018	NBC	103.47	106.6	43.1	68	33.4	78	$5,235,379	$6,712,469
LIII	February 3, 2019	CBS	98.48	98.2	41.1	67	31.0	78	$5,199,916	$6,548,118
LIV	February 2, 2020	Fox	101.32	104	41.6	69	30.1	77	$5,400,000	$6,717,886
LV	February 7, 2021	CBS	95.2 (Note: The original figure of 91.63 million was later revised by Nielsen due to their undercount of out-of-home viewers. However, the revised ratings are unknown.)	96.7	38.2	68	26.5	88	$5,500,000	$6,534,754
LVI	February 13, 2022	NBC	99.18	103.4	36.9	72	29.5		$6,500,000	$7,151,183
LVII	February 12, 2023	Fox	114.21 (Note: Revised from 112.17 because of a Nielsen error)	121	40.4		33.8		$7,000,000	$7,396,789
LVIII	February 11, 2024	CBS	120.25	123.4	42.1	81	35.9	111	$7,000,000	$7,184,152
LVIII	February 11, 2024	Nickelodeon	1.25		0.5	Unknown	Unknown	Unknown	$250,000	$256,577
LIX	February 9, 2025	Fox	127.7	133.5	41.7	83			$7,500,000–$8,000,000	
LX	February 8, 2026	NBC	124.9	128.2	39.4	79			$8,000,000–$10,000,000	

==== 1967–1979 ====
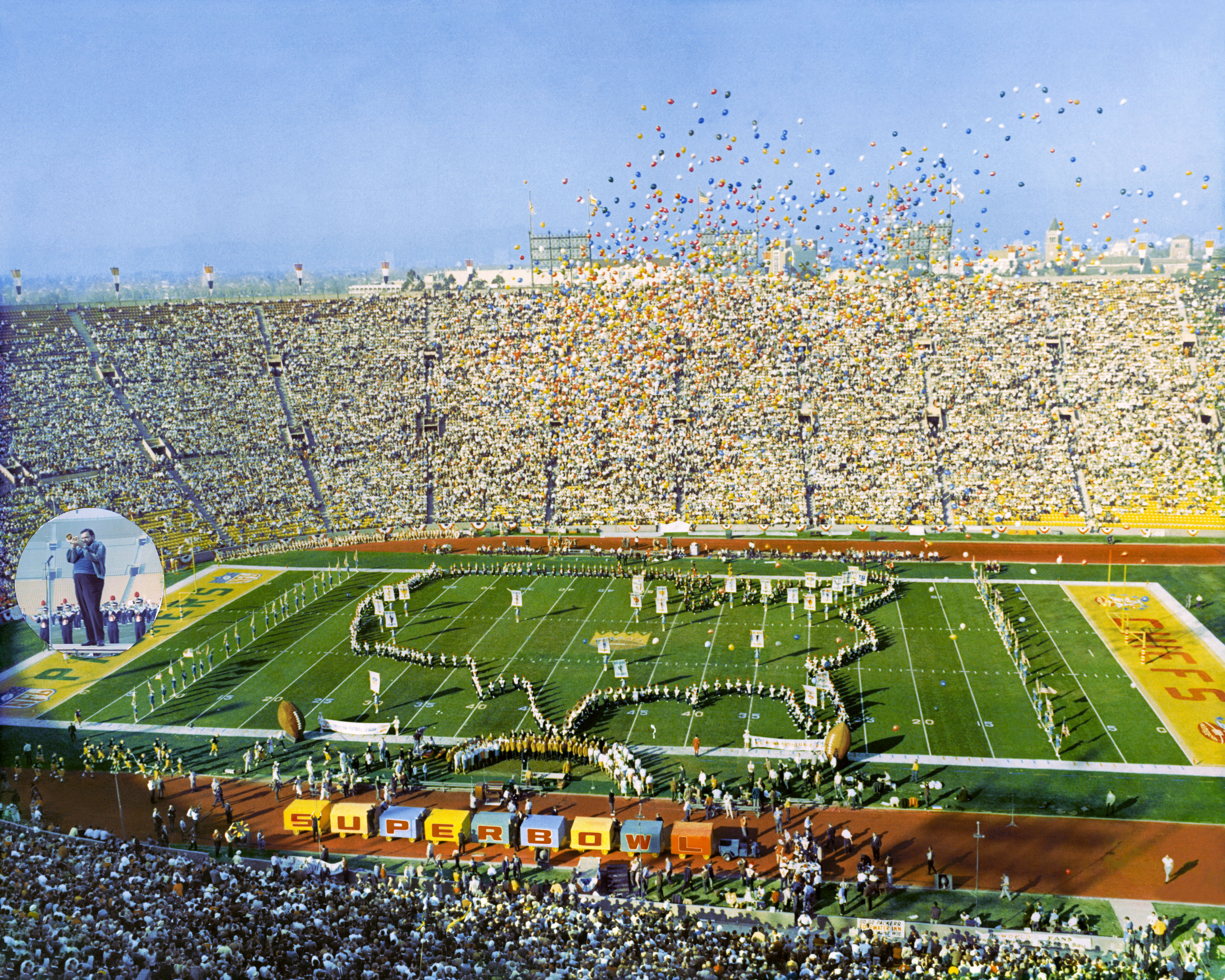
Super Bowl I was played at the Los Angeles Memorial Coliseum.

The first championship game was dubbed the "Super Nielsen Bowl" by the media. Variety predicted that the ratings for the game would be the most important of the year. At the time, CBS held the broadcasting rights to NFL games and NBC held the rights to AFL games. With one team from each league competing against each other, the two networks agreed to pay $1 million each to simulcast Super Bowl I. As NFL games on CBS rated double those of AFL games on NBC during the regular season, CBS was able to charge advertisers tens of thousands of dollars more than NBC for 60-second commercials during the broadcast. For years, CBS had held the reputation of being "the pro football network," and was expected to live up to it. Preliminary ratings for the game—which was controversially blacked out in Greater Los Angeles—were released a day later and showed that the CBS feed was more popular than the NBC. Three weeks later, this was confirmed when the national Nielsen ratings were released, crowning CBS the winner of the first "network Nielsen Bowl."

Unlike Super Bowl I, the 1968 game was broadcast by only one network, CBS. The preliminary Arbitron ratings as reported by the network gave the game a 43.0 rating, a 76 share, and a total viewership of over 70 million. However, the final Nielsen numbers later revealed the game was watched by 51.3 million total viewers and received a 36.8 rating and a 68 share—less than Super Bowl I. In New York City, the game received a 36.3 rating and a 61 share. 1969's Super Bowl III received an initial rating of 39.9 and a share of 79 with over 60 million total viewers. In New York City, the game registered a preliminary rating of 40.5 on NBC, more than eight times the combined rating of CBS and ABC broadcasts at the same time. Final numbers gave Super Bowl III a national rating of 36.0, lower than the previous year, though the total viewership was up from 51.3 million to 54.5 million.

In contrast with previous years, Super Bowl IV's ratings were largely underestimated. Overnight Nielsen ratings gave the 1970 game a 38.8 rating and a 70 share, with 57 million total viewers; final numbers gave the game a 39.4 rating, 69 share, and 59.2 million total viewers. The 1971 game was watched by 39.8% of American households, making the NBC broadcast the highest-rated sports event on a single network, beating the final game of the 1963 World Series This record would be broken again the following year when the 1972 CBS broadcast of Super Bowl VI was watched by 44.2% of households. In 1973, Super Bowl VII was the first game to be exempt from a local television blackout following the amendment of an NFL policy requiring them at the time. Although 3 million more households were able to watch the game, the number of households that actually watched it increased by only 220,000 compared to the previous year, and the rating declined from a 44.2 to a 42.7. Likewise in 1974, the rating declined again to a 41.6, and total viewership for the game was 4.5 million less than the year before.

The 1975 Super Bowl was televised for five hours on NBC. As a result, the number of viewers who watched at least six minutes of the broadcast (total viewers) increased from 63.2 million to 71.3 million—a new record for the game. The rating and average viewership also increased compared to the previous year. With the Steelers winning the game, the broadcast in Pittsburgh attracted a preliminary rating of 63 and a share of 88 in the city, meaning 88% of the households in the city with television sets in use were watching it. In Los Angeles, the game received a 78% share of the audience, compared to the combined shares of the broadcasts on CBS and ABC at the same time of 4%. Super Bowl X also saw an increase in ratings; total viewership for the 1976 game increased by 2 million compared to the previous year and the national audience share was 78%, which remains the highest-ever number for the game on a single network.

In 1977, Super Bowl XI was watched by 81.9 million total viewers, beating the Game 7 viewership of the 1975 World Series and becoming the most-watched sports broadcast in American history. The rating of 44.4 and average viewership of 62.1 million also set new records for the game—all of which would be broken the following year when Super Bowl XII was the first to be broadcast in prime time in the Eastern Time Zone. As a result, total viewership grew by over 20 million and the 1978 game became the most-watched single-network broadcast in U.S. history; 102 million viewers watched at least five minutes. The audience share decreased to an all-time low, but the rating increased to a 47.2 from a 44.4 and average viewership increased by over 16 million compared the previous year, setting new highs for the game. In 1979, the Super Bowl XIII broadcast recorded a drop in both average and total viewership, and the rating decreased by 0.1 to a 47.1, though all were the second-best numbers ever for the game and the share grew by 7 percentage points to a 74.

==== 2010–2019 ====
In the first half of the decade, total U.S. TV viewership generally increased every year, peaking in 2015 during Super Bowl XLIX on NBC in terms of average viewership (at 115 million people). While the trend for average Super Bowl ratings decreased in the second half of the decade, Super Bowl LI on Fox in 2017, the first Super Bowl ever decided in overtime, currently holds the record for the largest total viewership in Super Bowl (and U.S. television) history at 172 million people. The halftime shows from 2010 to 2017 alone outperformed the actual game in terms of average U.S. TV viewership.

==== 2020s ====
Super Bowl LIV on Fox in 2020 opened up this decade amidst the emergence of the COVID-19 pandemic at the time and saw significant ratings improvement from the 2 previous Super Bowl editions, but suffered lower ratings the year after, with an average of 91.63 million alone on CBS - the lowest since 2006. In 2022, with the resumption of full venue attendances at NFL games, Super Bowl LVI on NBC saw an average of 99.18 million viewers and total of 101.09 million, with streaming contributing an extra 11 million for a total of 112.3 million people. This is currently the second biggest average viewership in Super Bowl (and U.S. television) history. The Spanish audience nearly tripled from the year prior.

=== Spanish ===
Due to a growing Hispanic football fanbase, Spanish-language broadcasts of the Super Bowl by American channels began in 2014.

Super Bowl	Date	Network	Avg. viewers (millions)
XLVIII	February 2, 2014	Fox Deportes	0.56
XLIX	February 1, 2015	NBC Universo	0.37
50	February 7, 2016	ESPN Deportes	0.47
LI	February 5, 2017	Fox Deportes	0.65
LII	February 4, 2018	Universo	0.54
LIII	February 3, 2019	ESPN Deportes	0.47
LIV	February 2, 2020	Fox Deportes	0.76
LV	February 7, 2021	ESPN Deportes	0.65
LVI	February 13, 2022	Telemundo	1.91
LVII	February 12, 2023	Fox Deportes	0.88
LVIII	February 11, 2024	Univision	2.2
LIX	February 9, 2025	Fox Deportes	1.87
LIX	February 9, 2025	Telemundo	1.87
LX	February 8, 2026	Telemundo	3.3

== International ==
=== Canada ===
The Super Bowl has been broadcast in Canada since its inception on both English and French television networks. In English, the first 12 Super Bowl games were broadcast on CBC television stations and affiliates. The game rotated between CTV (1979, 1981, 1983) and CBC (1980, 1982) before airing on Global and its affiliates in 1984 and 1985. The game briefly returned to CTV in 1986 and then aired on Global from 1987 until 2007. Following a new deal with the NFL, CTV regained the rights to air the Super Bowl in Canada and it has aired on the network since 2008. The game has also been simulcast on CTV 2 (2017–19) and sports cable channel TSN (2016–present). In Quebec, the first 20 games aired on French television stations owned by the SRC (the Canadian Broadcasting Company is known in French as the Société Radio-Canada). From 1987 to 1991, the Super Bowl aired on TQS, with the exception of the 1989 game which was only available on NBC via cable. In 1992, 1993, and 1994, the game was broadcast on sports channel RDS before moving to TVA in 1995. In 1996, the game returned to RDS and has aired on the channel since.

Viewership for early games was estimated through various surveys conducted by Numeris and/or Nielsen Canada. However, reliable figures are only available since the 1990s when Nielsen began tracking viewership in the province of Ontario in 1991; electronic measurement of the game was not conducted by Numeris nationally until the mid-2000s. Following the introduction of the Portable People Meter (PPM) in Canada in time for the 2010 game, viewership increased significantly compared to the previous decade. In 2014 and 2015, total Canadian viewership equaled or exceeded that of American total viewership, per capita. A controversial decision by the Canadian Radio-television and Telecommunications Commission (CRTC) banned Canadian networks from simsubbing the Super Bowl in 2017, 2018, and 2019. This caused a decline in the measured number of viewers watching the game on Bell Media's CTV and TSN channels; The number of viewers watching the American network broadcast was not counted. The rule was overturned by the Supreme Court of Canada prior to the 2020 game.

Similar to the United States, ad prices have also increased over the years on English networks in Canada. In 1977 and 1978, the cost of a 30-second ad was $2,500 and $3,200 Canadian, respectively. By 1992, the price had increased to $25,000. In 1994 and 1995, the price was $29,000 and $40,000, respectively. By 1998, the price had increased to $45,000. In 2000, the price was $85,000 per 30 seconds—more than a 50% increase over the $55,000 it cost in 1999. The ad price was approximately $100,000 in 2003. In 2005, the cost of a 30-second ad was $110,000; it was lowered to $100,000 for the next two games due to a decline in viewership. Following the acquisition of Super Bowl broadcasts rights by CTV, the price returned to $110,000 in 2008. It then increased to approximately $117,000 for the 2009 game, before declining slightly for the 2010 game. In 2011, CTV charged about $100,000. By 2012, ads cost close to $130,000 per 30 seconds. Ads cost between $170,000 and $200,000 for the 2015 game, and between $150,000 and $200,000 for the 2020 game.

Note: Viewership figure for the 2018 English-language broadcast excludes TSN.

Super Bowl television ratings in Canada showing network(s) broadcast on and average viewership, 1998–present
Super Bowl	Date	English		French	
Super Bowl	Date	Network(s)	Avg. viewers	Network	Avg. viewers
XXXII	January 25, 1998	Global	3,000,000	RDS	Unknown
XXXIII	January 31, 1999	Global	3,399,000	RDS	Unknown
XXXIV	January 30, 2000	Global	4,000,000	RDS	Unknown
XXXV	January 28, 2001	Global	3,000,000	RDS	Unknown
XXXVI	February 3, 2002	Global	3,600,000	RDS	Unknown
XXXVII	January 26, 2003	Global	3,600,000	RDS	617,000
XXXVIII	February 1, 2004	Global	3,560,000	RDS	Unknown
XXXIX	February 6, 2005	Global	3,130,000	RDS	Unknown
XL	February 5, 2006	Global	4,281,000	RDS	702,000
XLI	February 4, 2007	Global	3,367,000	RDS	816,000
XLII	February 3, 2008	CTV	4,234,000	RDS	905,000
XLIII	February 1, 2009	CTV	3,600,000	RDS	Unknown
XLIV	February 7, 2010	CTV	6,017,000	RDS	Unknown
XLV	February 6, 2011	CTV	6,537,000	RDS	Unknown
XLVI	February 5, 2012	CTV	7,280,000	RDS	765,000
XLVII	February 3, 2013	CTV	6,447,000	RDS	Unknown
XLVIII	February 2, 2014	CTV	7,318,000	RDS	Unknown
XLIX	February 1, 2015	CTV	8,262,000	RDS	894,000
50	February 7, 2016	CTV	7,372,000	RDS	939,000
LI	February 5, 2017	CTV; CTV 2 TSN	5,602,000	RDS	997,000
LII	February 4, 2018	CTV; CTV 2 TSN	4,470,000	RDS	949,000
LIII	February 3, 2019	CTV; CTV 2 TSN	5,523,000	RDS	981,000
LIV	February 4, 2020	CTV; TSN	9,500,000	RDS	1,669,000
LV	February 7, 2021	CTV; TSN	9,414,000	RDS	1,121,000
LVI	February 13, 2022	CTV; TSN	8,485,000	RDS	951,000
LVII	February 12, 2023	CTV; TSN	8,600,000^{[a]}		
LVIII	February 11, 2024	CTV; TSN	10,000,000^{[a]}		
LIX	February 9, 2025	CTV; TSN	8,500,000		
LX	February 8, 2026	CTV; TSN			

^{a} French and English combined viewership on CTV, TSN, and RDS.

==== 1967–2009 ====
According to in-house research conducted by the network, the 1977 game was watched by approximately 3.5 million Canadians on the CBC's English and French television stations. In 1978, Nielsen conducted the first independent ratings survey and found that the 1978 game was watched by 4,495,000 million Canadians, including 550,000 on French television stations. In 1979, a Bureau of Broadcast Measurement (BBM) survey found that 4,605,000 million Canadians watched that year's Super Bowl; a separate Nielsen survey measured 4.1 million viewers on English television stations only. In 1980, Nielsen found that Super Bowl XV was watched by approximately 3.1 million viewers—a decline of over one million compared to the previous year—though it was the most watched broadcast of the week. The 1981 game was watched by 3.5 million on English television stations according to BBM; a later survey by the organization measured an audience of 4,482,000 viewers across both languages. In 1982, Nielsen found that Super Bowl XVI was watched by 3.2 million Canadians. In 1985, the game was watched by 1,649,000 viewers on Global. According to the company's 1986 survey of the game, 4,065,000 Canadians watched Super Bowl XX, including 427,000 in Montreal alone.

In 1996, Super Bowl XXX was watched by 1.7 million viewers in Ontario according to Nielsen. The next year, viewership declined to 1,528,000 but returned to 1.7 million for the 1998 game, which drew approximately 3 million viewers nationwide. In 1999, Super Bowl XXXIII was watched by 3,399,000 viewers—the largest electronically measured audience in the game's Canadian broadcast history. This record would be broken the following year when the 2000 game was watched by 4 million, according to preliminary figures. However, the 2001 game was watched by just over 3 million, including 1,548,000 in Ontario—both of which represented multi-year viewership lows. The next year, viewership increased to an average of 3.6 million for the 2002 game, and increased again to 4.2 million for the 2003 game. However, viewership would decline for the next two years; the 2004 game was watched by 3.56 million, and 3.13 million watched the game in 2005.

In 2006, however, viewership increased. Super Bowl XL drew a record English-language audience of 4,281,000 and a French-language audience of 702,000. The 2007 game drew an audience of 3,397,000 English viewers—down over 800,000 compared to the previous year—but the number of French viewers who watched the game increased by over 100,000 to 816,000. The French audience increased again the next year to a preliminary 905,000—a record for broadcaster RDS—and the English audience increased to 4,234,000 and peaked at 5.83 million. In 2009, viewership declined; the English broadcast was watched by 3,602,000, while the French broadcast was watched by 691,000.

=== Mexico ===
In Mexico, Super Bowl LIV averaged 3.7 million viewers in Mexico and a 7.3 rating, with 2.94 for TV Azteca, 2.66 for Televisa, 0.87 for Fox Sports, and 0.83 for ESPN. The event had a total reach of 12 million viewers.

Super Bowl LVIII had a total of 24.1 million viewers and an average of 8.7 million, making it the second country with the most international average viewership after Canada. Since records began, the average viewership of that year's championship is the highest to date.

== See also ==
- List of most watched television broadcasts in the United States
- NBA Finals television ratings
- Stanley Cup Finals television ratings
- World Series television ratings
- MLS Cup television ratings

== Glossary ==
- 18–49 rating – the average percentage of adults age 18–49 in the United States with a television set who were watching the game at any given minute during its broadcast. For example, during the 2019–20 television season, a 1.0 18–49 rating was equivalent to approximately 1.28 million U.S. adults age 18–49.
- 18–49 share – the average percentage of adults age 18–49 in the United States with a television set in use who were watching the game at any given minute during its broadcast.
- average viewers – the average number of viewers who were watching the game at any given minute during its broadcast; the standard ratings measurement metric.
- household rating – the average percentage of households in the United States with a television set that were watching the game at any given minute during its broadcast. For example, during the 2019–20 television season, a 1.0 household rating was equivalent to approximately 1.21 million U.S. households.
- household share – the average percentage of households in the United States with a television set in use that were watching the game at any given minute during its broadcast.
