= World Series television ratings =

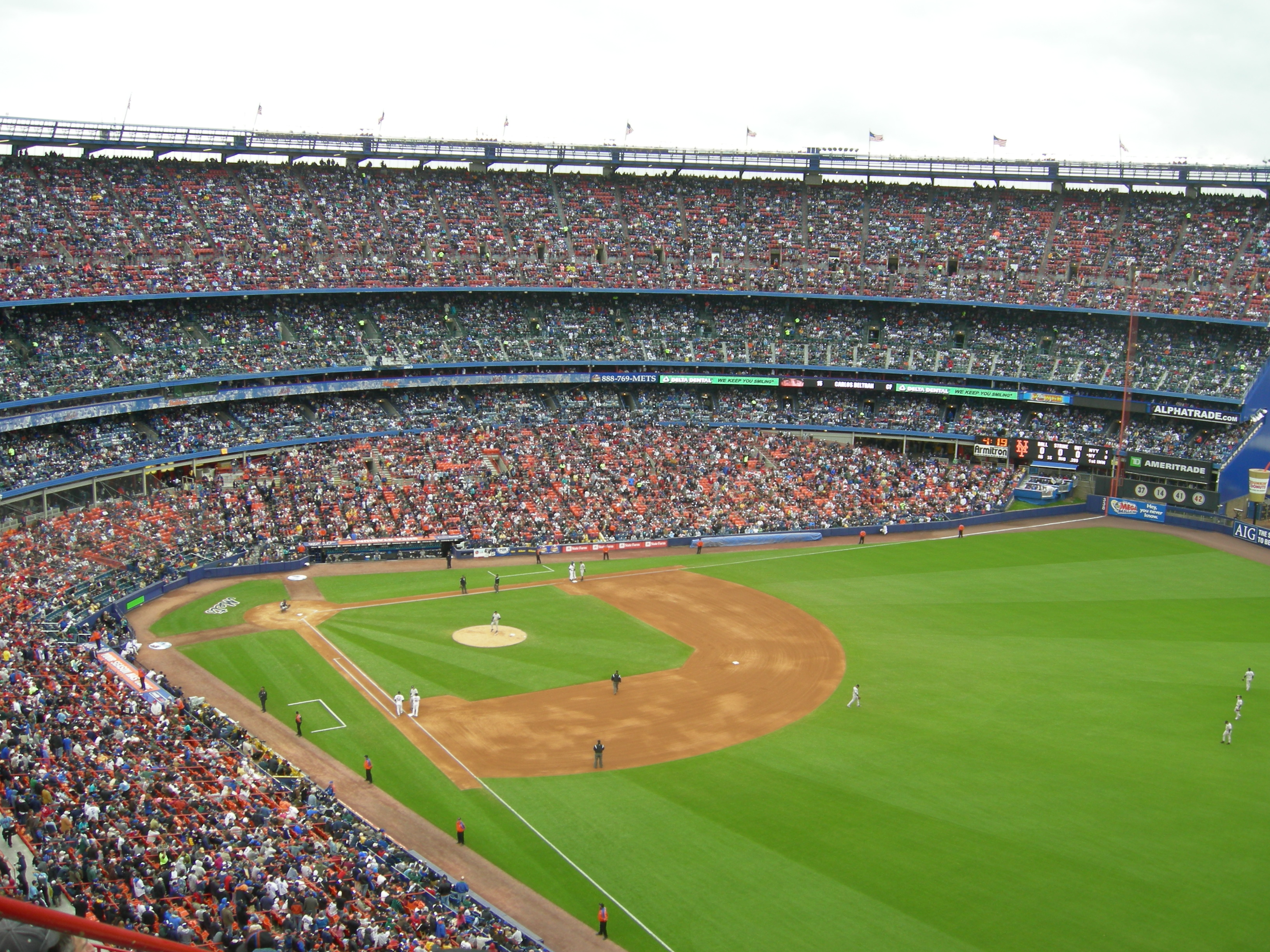
Shea Stadium, venue of one of the highest-rated and most-watched individual games, Game 7 of the 1986 World Series.

Audience measurement by Nielsen Media Research, commonly referred to as Nielsen ratings, has provided World Series television ratings since at least 1963. (Note: The first World Series broadcast on television was in 1947 between the New York Yankees and Brooklyn Dodgers, carried regionally in the New York City area.) Key measurements are ratings, the percentage of all U.S. television-equipped households that watched a game, share, the percentage of television sets in use that were tuned to a game, and total viewers (or viewership), the average number of people watching a game throughout its duration.

The highest ratings for an entire World Series is tied between 1978, featuring the New York Yankees and Los Angeles Dodgers, and 1980, featuring the Philadelphia Phillies and Kansas City Royals. Both series went six games and averaged a rating of 32.8 and a share of 56. Average viewership was slightly larger in 1978 (44,278,950) than in 1980 (42,300,000).

The lowest ratings for an entire World Series was in 2023, a five-game series won by the Texas Rangers over the Arizona Diamondbacks, which averaged a 4.7 rating with a 14 share; it also had the lowest average viewership, at 9.082 million. Previously, the 2020 series in which the Los Angeles Dodgers defeated the Tampa Bay Rays in six games was the least watched, averaging a 5.2 rating and a 12 share.

The highest-rated individual game in World Series history was Game 6 in 1980, when the Philadelphia Phillies defeated the Kansas City Royals; the game had a 40.0 rating. The only other games with a rating of 39 or higher were Game 7 in 1975, when the Cincinnati Reds defeated the Boston Red Sox, with a 39.6 rating, and Game 4 in 1963, when the Los Angeles Dodgers swept the New York Yankees, with a 39.5 rating. The most-viewed game was Game 7 in 1986, when the New York Mets defeated the Boston Red Sox; with a rating of 38.9, its viewership is estimated at 55 to 60 million. (Note: Nielsen records do not list a viewership figure for this game.)

The lowest-rated individual game was Game 2 in 2023, which had a 4.0 rating. However, the smallest viewership for a televised Series game belongs to Game 3 in 2023 at 8.126 million, which had a 4.2 rating. The previous least-viewed game was Game 2 in 2023, which had 8.153 million viewers. Prior to 2020, the only World Series game with less than 10 million viewers had been Game 3 in 2008, which was impacted by a rain delay and had 9.836 million viewers.

The most recent World Series game to record a rating of 30 or higher was Game 7 in 1991, as the Minnesota Twins defeated the Atlanta Braves; the game had a viewership of 50.340 million. Game 7 in 2016 between the Chicago Cubs and Cleveland Indians had an average viewership of 40.045 million—the most-watched World Series game in 25 years dating back to 1991—and peaked at 49.9 million viewers, and Fox estimated more than 75 million people watched all or part of the game.

All four major U.S. broadcast television networks (ABC, CBS, NBC, and Fox) have broadcast the World Series. Fox has been the exclusive broadcast network for the World Series since 2000, and has a contract with MLB to carry the World Series through 2028.

== Viewership/rating by year ==
The graph below shows the average rating (in percentage) and average number of viewers (in millions) for each World Series since 1973; older Nielsen records lack average viewer counts. For example, the 1973 World Series (the leftmost data points) had an average rating of 30.7 (percentage of all U.S. television-equipped households that watched) and an average viewership of 34.8 (million viewers). This chart shows trending over time; specific figures are available in the television ratings by year section.

View source data.

== Least and most viewed World Series ==
These tables list the World Series with the smallest and largest average viewership (figures in millions) since 1973.

Least viewed
Rank	Year	Average	Games
1	2023	9.082 M	5
2	2020	9.785 M	6
3	2021	11.744 M	6
4	2022	11.762 M	6
5	2026	11.828 M	5

Most viewed
Rank	Year	Average	Games
1	1978	44.279 M	6
2	1980	42.300 M	6
3	1981	41.370 M	6
4	1982	38.070 M	7
5	1979	37.960 M	7

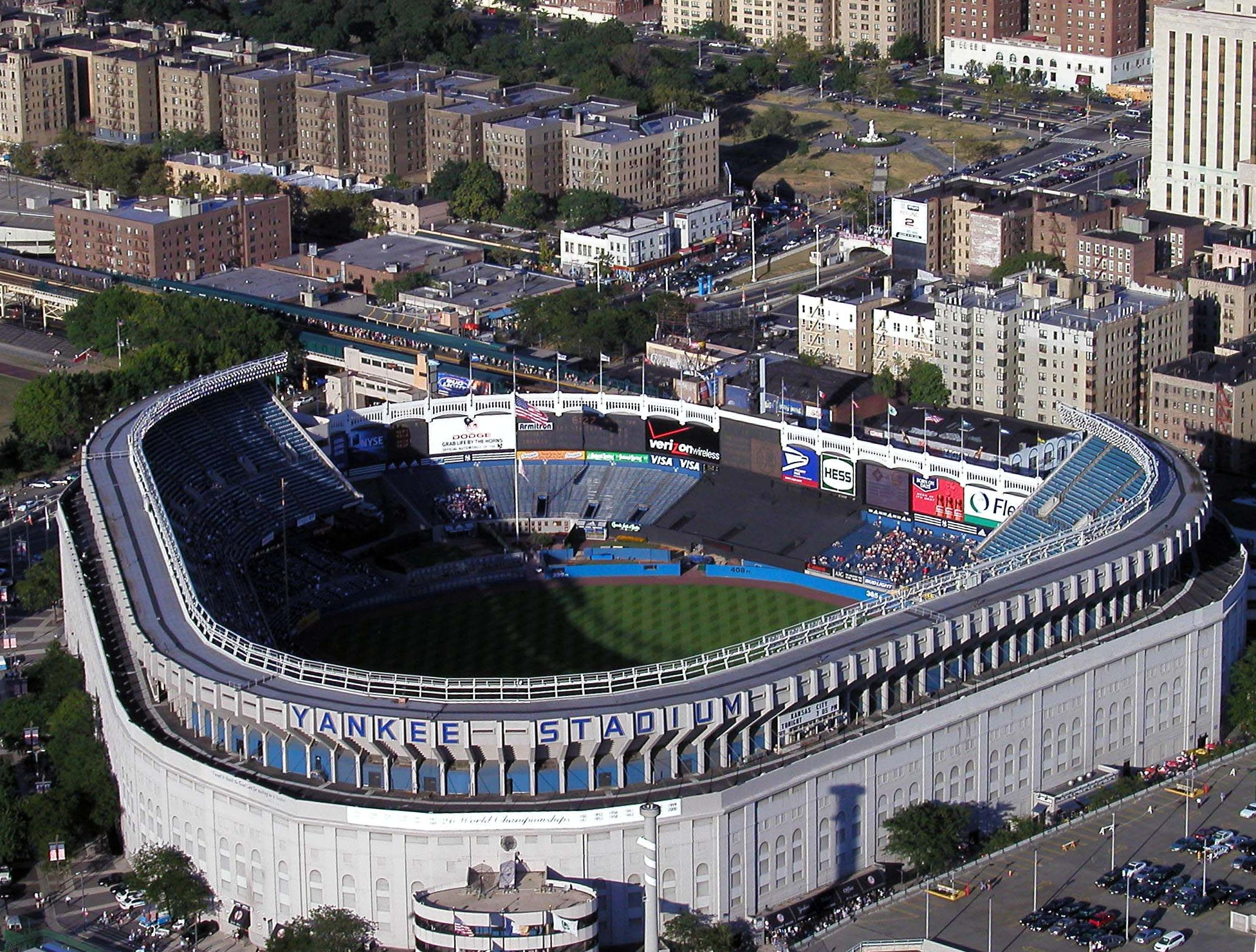
Yankee Stadium, site of three games of the 1978 World Series.

== Viewership records ==
The following table shows the viewership (figures in millions) records—both largest and smallest—for games one through seven in a World Series since 1973.

	Average	Game 1	Game 2	Game 3	Game 4	Game 5	Game 6	Game 7
Highest	44.279 M (1978)	43.510 M (1978)	42.990 M (1980)	43.810 M (1978)	39.220 M (1978)	48.990 M (1982)	54.860 M (1980)	55–60 M (1986)
Lowest	9.082 M (2023)	9.172 M (2023)	8.153 M (2023)	8.126 M (2023)	8.480 M (2023)	10.059 M (2020)	12.549 M (2022)	23.013 M (2019)

== Television ratings by year ==
Figures are expressed as ratings/share. Ratings represent the percentage of U.S. households that watched the game on television. Share represents the percentage of television sets in use that were tuned to the game.

Key to colors
Most viewers for each Game (1 through 7) or Average
Fewest viewers for each Game (1 through 7) or Average

Year	Network	Results	Average	Game 1	Game 2	Game 3	Game 4	Game 5	Game 6	Game 7
2026	Fox	Milwaukee Brewers 4, Tampa Bay Rays 1	(11.828 M viewers)	(12.260 M viewers)	(10.660 M viewers)	(8.330 M viewers)	(13.310 M viewers)	(14.220 M viewers)	No Game	
2025	Fox	Los Angeles Dodgers 4, Toronto Blue Jays 3	7.2 (15.492 M viewers)	5.7/20 (12.499 M viewers)	5.2/18 (11.399 M viewers)	5.3/16 (11.157 M viewers)	7.2/23 (14.520 M viewers)	7.1/23 (14.305 M viewers)	8/28 (17.682 M viewers)	11.5 (26.88 M viewers)
2024	Fox	Los Angeles Dodgers 4, New York Yankees 1	7.3/22 (15.102 M viewers)	6.6/21 (14.163 M viewers)	6.2/20 (13.713 M viewers)	6.6/19 (13.208 M viewers)	8.2/24 (16.275 M viewers)	9.0/28 (18.152 M viewers)	No Game	
2023	Fox	Texas Rangers 4, Arizona Diamondbacks 1	4.7/14 (9.082 M viewers)	4.6/15 (9.172 M viewers)	4.0/12 (8.153 M viewers)	4.2/11 (8.126 M viewers)	4.5/13 (8.480 M viewers)	6.0/17 (11.481 M viewers)	No Game	
2022	Fox	Houston Astros 4, Philadelphia Phillies 2	6.108 (11.762 M viewers)	5.69 (11.475 M viewers)	5.34 (10.789 M viewers)	6.11 (11.162 M viewers)	6.48 (11.809 M viewers)	6.92 (12.786 M viewers)	6.11 (12.549 M viewers)	No Game
2021	Fox	Atlanta Braves 4, Houston Astros 2	6.5/16 (11.744 M viewers)	6.1 (10.811 M viewers)	5.8 (10.280 M viewers)	6.1 (11.232 M viewers)	5.65 (10.511 M viewers)	7.4 (13.644 M viewers)	7.9 (14.140 M viewers)	No Game
2020	Fox	Los Angeles Dodgers 4, Tampa Bay Rays 2	5.2/12 (9.785 M viewers)	5.1/11 (9.353 M viewers)	5.0/11 (9.184 M viewers)	4.3/10 (8.156 M viewers)	4.8/12 (9.332 M viewers)	5.3/11 (10.059 M viewers)	6.8/15 (12.819 M viewers)	No Game
2019	Fox	Washington Nationals 4, Houston Astros 3	8.1/16 (13.912 M viewers)	7.3/15 (12.194 M viewers)	7.1/15 (11.925 M viewers)	7.1/15 (12.220 M viewers)	5.9/13 (10.219 M viewers)	6.5/12 (11.390 M viewers)	9.6/19 (16.425 M viewers)	13.1/25 (23.013 M viewers)
2018	Fox	Boston Red Sox 4, Los Angeles Dodgers 1	8.3/17 (14.125 M viewers)	8.2/16 (13.761 M viewers)	8.1/15 (13.458 M viewers)	7.9/18 (13.251 M viewers)	7.9/16 (13.563 M viewers)	10.0/18 (17.634 M viewers)	No Game	
2017	Fox	Houston Astros 4, Los Angeles Dodgers 3	10.7/20 (18.926 M viewers)	8.7/15 (14.968 M viewers)	9.2/18 (15.483 M viewers)	8.8/17 (15.676 M viewers)	8.7/17 (15.400 M viewers)	10.5/21 (18.940 M viewers)	12.6/23 (22.229 M viewers)	15.8/28 (28.240 M viewers)
2016	Fox	Chicago Cubs 4, Cleveland Indians 3	12.9/22 (22.847 M viewers)	11.3/20 (19.368 M viewers)	10.2/18 (17.395 M viewers)	11.0/20 (19.384 M viewers)	9.3/18 (16.705 M viewers)	13.1/21 (23.638 M viewers)	13.3/23 (23.396 M viewers)	21.8/37 (40.045 M viewers)
2015	Fox	Kansas City Royals 4, New York Mets 1	8.6/16 (14.533 M viewers)	9.0/17 (14.944 M viewers)	8.3/14 (13.722 M viewers)	7.9/15 (13.205 M viewers)	7.8/15 (13.587 M viewers)	10.0/17 (17.206 M viewers)	No Game	
2014	Fox	San Francisco Giants 4, Kansas City Royals 3	8.2/14 (13.930 M viewers)	7.3/12 (12.191 M viewers)	7.9/14 (12.917 M viewers)	7.2/13 (12.133 M viewers)	6.3/12 (10.742 M viewers)	7.3/12 (12.635 M viewers)	8.1/13 (13.372 M viewers)	13.7/23 (23.517 M viewers)
2013	Fox	Boston Red Sox 4, St. Louis Cardinals 2	8.9/15 (14.984 M viewers)	8.6/14 (14.400 M viewers)	8.3/13 (13.429 M viewers)	7.4/14 (12.473 M viewers)	9.4/15 (15.975 M viewers)	8.9/14 (14.446 M viewers)	11.3/18 (19.178 M viewers)	No Game
2012	Fox	San Francisco Giants 4, Detroit Tigers 0	7.6/12 (12.636 M viewers)	7.6/12 (12.240 M viewers)	7.8/12 (12.340 M viewers)	6.1/11 (10.471 M viewers)	8.9/14 (15.485 M viewers)	No Game		
2011	Fox	St. Louis Cardinals 4, Texas Rangers 3	10.0/16 (16.521 M viewers)	8.7/14 (14.174 M viewers)	8.9/14 (14.280 M viewers)	6.6/12 (11.247 M viewers)	9.2/14 (15.156 M viewers)	8.8/14 (14.324 M viewers)	12.7/21 (21.065 M viewers)	14.7/25 (25.403 M viewers)
2010	Fox	San Francisco Giants 4, Texas Rangers 1	8.4/14 (14.217 M viewers)	8.9/15 (15.009 M viewers)	8.5/14 (14.130 M viewers)	6.7/13 (11.460 M viewers)	9.0/15 (15.537 M viewers)	8.8/14 (14.950 M viewers)	No Game	
2009	Fox	New York Yankees 4, Philadelphia Phillies 2	11.7/19 (19.334 M viewers)	11.9/19 (19.511 M viewers)	11.7/19 (18.897 M viewers)	9.1/18 (15.397 M viewers)	13.5/22 (22.761 M viewers)	10.6/16 (17.092 M viewers)	13.4/22 (22.339 M viewers)	No Game
2008	Fox	Philadelphia Phillies 4, Tampa Bay Rays 1	8.4/14 (13.193 M viewers)	9.2/15 (14.634 M viewers)	8.1/13 (12.777 M viewers)	6.1/13 (9.836 M viewers)	9.3/15 (15.479 M viewers)	9.6/14 (15.787 M viewers)	No Game	
2007	Fox	Boston Red Sox 4, Colorado Rockies 0	10.6/18 (17.123 M viewers)	10.5/18 (16.897 M viewers)	11.1/18 (16.950 M viewers)	8.5/16 (14.055 M viewers)	12.6/21 (20.946 M viewers)	No Game		
2006	Fox	St. Louis Cardinals 4, Detroit Tigers 1	10.1/17 (15.812 M viewers)	8.0/15 (12.840 M viewers)	11.6/18 (18.165 M viewers)	10.2/17 (15.582 M viewers)	10.4/18 (16.113 M viewers)	10.3/18 (16.277 M viewers)	No Game	
2005	Fox	Chicago White Sox 4, Houston Astros 0	11.1/19 (17.162 M viewers)	9.5/17 (15.015 M viewers)	11.1/17 (17.190 M viewers)	11.0/21 (16.652 M viewers)	13.0/21 (19.979 M viewers)	No Game		
2004	Fox	Boston Red Sox 4, St. Louis Cardinals 0	15.8/26 (25.390 M viewers)	13.7/25 (23.168 M viewers)	15.9/24 (25.463 M viewers)	15.7/24 (24.422 M viewers)	18.2/28 (28.844 M viewers)	No Game		
2003	Fox	Florida Marlins 4, New York Yankees 2	12.8/22 (20.143 M viewers)	10.9/20 (17.687 M viewers)	12.6/20 (20.552 M viewers)	12.5/21 (18.889 M viewers)	13.6/23 (20.885 M viewers)	13.2/21 (19.919 M viewers)	13.9/25 (23.240 M viewers)	No Game
2002	Fox	Anaheim Angels 4, San Francisco Giants 3	11.9/20 (19.261 M viewers)	9.4/18 (15.457 M viewers)	11.9/20 (19.368 M viewers)	10.8/18 (17.043 M viewers)	11.8/19 (18.085 M viewers)	10.0/17 (15.840 M viewers)	11.8/21 (19.221 M viewers)	17.9/28 (30.814 M viewers)
2001	Fox	Arizona Diamondbacks 4, New York Yankees 3	15.7/26 (24.528 M viewers)	10.4/19 (16.476 M viewers)	15.0/23 (23.550 M viewers)	15.4/24 (23.407 M viewers)	15.8/27 (23.692 M viewers)	14.4/24 (21.323 M viewers)	13.8/24 (22.672 M viewers)	23.5/34 (39.084 M viewers)
2000	Fox	New York Yankees 4, New York Mets 1	12.4/21 (18.081 M viewers)	11.5/22 (17.556 M viewers)	12.6/20 (19.045 M viewers)	12.4/21 (17.453 M viewers)	12.5/21 (17.611 M viewers)	13.1/21 (18.927 M viewers)	No Game	
1999	NBC	New York Yankees 4, Atlanta Braves 0	16.0/26 (23.731 M viewers)	14.2/26 (22.035 M viewers)	15.0/23 (22.825 M viewers)	16.8/27 (24.116 M viewers)	17.8/29 (25.848 M viewers)	No Game		
1998	Fox	New York Yankees 4, San Diego Padres 0	14.1/24 (20.340 M viewers)	12.4/23 (18.740 M viewers)	12.6/20 (17.860 M viewers)	15.4/25 (21.970 M viewers)	16.6/27 (23.390 M viewers)	No Game		
1997	NBC	Florida Marlins 4, Cleveland Indians 3	16.7/29 (24.790 M viewers)	11.3/22 (16.810 M viewers)	15.0/24 (22.460 M viewers)	15.6/27 (22.190 M viewers)	15.5/26 (22.070 M viewers)	17.2/30 (24.200 M viewers)	15.5/28 (23.740 M viewers)	24.5/39 (37.990 M viewers)
1996	Fox	New York Yankees 4, Atlanta Braves 2	17.4/29 (25.220 M viewers)	15.7/25 (23.690 M viewers)	14.0/23 (19.430 M viewers)	17.5/28 (23.990 M viewers)	17.9/32 (25.160 M viewers)	20.0/32 (28.520 M viewers)	19.1/34 (30.440 M viewers)	No Game
1995	ABC/NBC	Atlanta Braves 4, Cleveland Indians 2	19.5/33 (28.970 M viewers)	16.4/30 (25.150 M viewers, ABC)	19.4/31 (29.350 M viewers, NBC)	20.0/34 (28.720 M viewers, NBC)	20.0/33 (28.670 M viewers, ABC)	21.6/34 (31.710 M viewers, ABC)	19.5/35 (30.280 M viewers, NBC)	No Game
1994	Canceled due to the MLB strike									
1993	CBS	Toronto Blue Jays 4, Philadelphia Phillies 2	17.3/30 (24.700 M viewers)	15.5/29 (23.100 M viewers)	17.9/29 (25.200 M viewers)	15.2/28 (20.570 M viewers)	18.0/31 (24.590 M viewers)	18.4/30 (26.110 M viewers)	19.1/35 (29.050 M viewers)	No Game
1992	CBS	Toronto Blue Jays 4, Atlanta Braves 2	20.2/34 (30.010 M viewers)	15.6/28 (25.020 M viewers)	20.2/32 (29.590 M viewers)	20.8/33 (29.980 M viewers)	18.9/30 (26.410 M viewers)	21.6/36 (31.230 M viewers)	22.7/41 (35.000 M viewers)	No Game
1991	CBS	Minnesota Twins 4, Atlanta Braves 3	24.0/39 (35.680 M viewers)	17.6/32 (26.310 M viewers)	21.7/34 (30.840 M viewers)	23.5/39 (33.170 M viewers)	22.9/36 (32.100 M viewers)	22.9/37 (33.180 M viewers)	25.4/44 (40.830 M viewers)	32.2/49 (50.340 M viewers)
1990	CBS	Cincinnati Reds 4, Oakland Athletics 0	20.8/36 (30.240 M viewers)	20.2/32 (28.600 M viewers)	21.8/37 (30.570 M viewers)	19.4/35 (28.720 M viewers)	21.4/38 (32.910 M viewers)	No Game		
1989	ABC	Oakland Athletics 4, San Francisco Giants 0	16.4/29 (24.550 M viewers)	16.2/30 (25.030 M viewers)	17.4/28 (25.410 M viewers)	17.5/32 (26.610 M viewers)	14.7/28 (21.640 M viewers)	No Game		
1988	NBC	Los Angeles Dodgers 4, Oakland Athletics 1	23.9/39 (34.490 M viewers)	20.5/38 (30.350 M viewers)	23.1/36 (34.700 M viewers)	24.8/40 (34.990 M viewers)	24.2/39 (33.960 M viewers)	27.0/43 (38.800 M viewers)	No Game	
1987	ABC	Minnesota Twins 4, St. Louis Cardinals 3	24.0/41 (35.340 M viewers)	19.2/35 (30.570 M viewers)	21.9/34 (33.660 M viewers)	24.9/40 (34.990 M viewers)	23.8/38 (34.040 M viewers)	23.4/38 (32.550 M viewers)	20.9/47 (29.090 M viewers)	32.6/50 (51.180 M viewers)
1986	NBC	New York Mets 4, Boston Red Sox 3	28.6/46 (36.370 M viewers)	24.2/42 (33.100 M viewers)	25.5/41 (32.340 M viewers)	25.6/40 (33.200 M viewers)	26.0/41 (34.490 M viewers)	29.8/47 (38.710 M viewers)	30.3/52 (44.510 M viewers)	38.9/55 (55–60 M viewers)
1985	ABC	Kansas City Royals 4, St. Louis Cardinals 3	25.3/39 (34.510 M viewers)	22.1/37 (31.510 M viewers)	23.2/35 (31.770 M viewers)	25.4/38 (32.800 M viewers)	24.8/38 (35.040 M viewers)	24.9/38 (30.950 M viewers)	24.2/41 (34.860 M viewers)	32.6/47 (45.000 M viewers)
1984	NBC	Detroit Tigers 4, San Diego Padres 1	22.9/40 (28.010 M viewers)	27.7/44 (33.860 M viewers)	26.0/40 (32.010 M viewers)	21.5/35 (26.810 M viewers)	15.0/41 (18.020 M viewers)	22.7/42 (28.580 M viewers)	No Game	
1983	ABC	Baltimore Orioles 4, Philadelphia Phillies 1	23.4/41 (29.540 M viewers)	27.7/41 (36.230 M viewers)	26.8/40 (34.550 M viewers)	23.9/40 (30.120 M viewers)	17.6/47 (20.260 M viewers)	21.0/39 (26.950 M viewers)	No Game	
1982	NBC	St. Louis Cardinals 4, Milwaukee Brewers 3	27.9/49 (38.070 M viewers)	27.9/42 (37.460 M viewers)	29.1/45 (37.700 M viewers)	25.0/41 (32.890 M viewers)	21.0/56 (26.210 M viewers)	30.4/57 (48.990 M viewers)	24.0/44 (32.350 M viewers)	38.2/56 (49.930 M viewers)
1981	ABC	Los Angeles Dodgers 4, New York Yankees 2	30.0/49 (41.370 M viewers)	29.9/46 (39.720 M viewers)	28.8/44 (39.110 M viewers)	29.0/47 (40.140 M viewers)	28.4/57 (37.970 M viewers)	26.4/45 (39.110 M viewers)	37.2/54 (n.a. viewers)	No Game
1980	NBC	Philadelphia Phillies 4, Kansas City Royals 2	32.8/56 (42.300 M viewers)	33.5/52 (42.040 M viewers)	34.4/53 (42.990 M viewers)	32.0/53 (39.170 M viewers)	23.9/60 (29.320 M viewers)	32.0/60 (45.460 M viewers)	40.0/60 (54.860 M viewers)	No Game
1979	ABC	Pittsburgh Pirates 4, Baltimore Orioles 3	28.5/50 (37.960 M viewers)	28.2/46 (38.140 M viewers)	29.6/48 (36.320 M viewers)	22.5/39 (31.420 M viewers)	23.5/63 (27.210 M viewers)	26.2/53 (39.090 M viewers)	32.5/48 (43.640 M viewers)	36.9/56 (49.890 M viewers)
1978	NBC	New York Yankees 4, Los Angeles Dodgers 2	32.8/56 (44.279 M viewers)	33.1/51 (43.510 M viewers)	32.2/50 (42.720 M viewers)	33.0/54 (43.810 M viewers)	30.1/65 (39.220 M viewers)	32.6/60 (45.870 M viewers)	35.9/54 (50.600 M viewers)	No Game
1977	ABC	New York Yankees 4, Los Angeles Dodgers 2	29.8/53 (37.150 M viewers)	30.3/50 (36.960 M viewers)	30.5/49 (35.880 M viewers)	30.2/51 (37.410 M viewers)	27.2/64 (31.460 M viewers)	26.6/52 (37.010 M viewers)	33.9/50 (44.200 M viewers)	No Game
1976	NBC	Cincinnati Reds 4, New York Yankees 0	27.5/48 (34.720 M viewers)	20.3/58 (23.730 M viewers)	29.4/43 (n.a. viewers)	29.8/44 (36.250 M viewers)	30.5/48 (38.790 M viewers)	No Game		
1975	NBC	Cincinnati Reds 4, Boston Red Sox 3	28.7/52 (35.960 M viewers)	20.0/58 (20.990 M viewers)	20.1/53 (24.320 M viewers)	28.9/47 (37.910 M viewers)	28.0/46 (34.640 M viewers)	30.9/48 (40.710 M viewers)	33.3/55 (41.570 M viewers)	39.6/60 (51.560 M viewers)
1974	NBC	Oakland Athletics 4, Los Angeles Dodgers 1	25.6/46 (29.080 M viewers)	23.4/55 (23.750 M viewers)	25.7/52 (30.470 M viewers)	26.5/41 (29.830 M viewers)	25.4/39 (29.760 M viewers)	27.2/42 (31.610 M viewers)	No Game	
1973	NBC	Oakland Athletics 4, New York Mets 3	30.7/57 (34.750 M viewers)	26.4/60 (27.444 M viewers)	28.8/55 (35.661 M viewers)	33.6/52 (38.030 M viewers)	32.2/50 (36.670 M viewers)	32.6/50 (37.364 M viewers)	27.7/67 (28.610 M viewers)	33.7/67 (39.935 M viewers)
1972	NBC	Oakland Athletics 4, Cincinnati Reds 3	27.6/58 (n.a. viewers)	21.2/60 (22.534 M viewers)	23.3/57 (27.331 M viewers)	33.6/49 (37.880 M viewers)	33.5/50 (38.210 M viewers)	22.3/56 (23.120 M viewers)	26.5/63 (30.048 M viewers)	32.8/71 (41.438 M viewers)
1971	NBC	Pittsburgh Pirates 4, Baltimore Orioles 3	24.2/59 (n.a. viewers)	21.8/58 (24.778 M viewers)	16.5/51 (13.633 M viewers)	16.5/51 (13.633 M viewers)	34.8/54 (38.898 M viewers)	16.5/51 (13.633 M viewers)	28.1/72 (28.095 M viewers)	34.2/72 (37.420 M viewers)
1970	NBC	Baltimore Orioles 4, Cincinnati Reds 1	19.4/53 (n.a. viewers)	23.5/58 (14.120 M viewers)	22.3/55 (13.400 M viewers)	17.2/51 (10.340 M viewers)	17.2/51 (10.340 M viewers)	17.2/51 (10.340 M viewers)	No Game	
1969	NBC	New York Mets 4, Baltimore Orioles 1	22.4/58 (n.a. viewers)	25.5/64 (14.920 M viewers)	29.2/63 (17.080 M viewers)	19.3/54 (11.290 M viewers)	19.3/54 (11.290 M viewers)	19.3/54 (11.290 M viewers)	No Game	
1968	NBC	Detroit Tigers 4, St. Louis Cardinals 3	22.8/57 (n.a. viewers)	20.4/53 (n.a. viewers)	20.4/53 (n.a. viewers)	26.5/68 (24.780 M viewers)	26.4/61 (27.542M viewers)	21.2/54 (n.a. viewers)	21.2/54 (n.a. viewers)	21.2/54 (n.a. viewers)
Year	Net.	Results	Average	Game 1	Game 2	Game 3	Game 4	Game 5	Game 6	Game 7

Source: 1968 through 2007 figures are per Nielsen documents; more recent years per inline citations.

== See also ==
- Super Bowl television ratings
- NBA Finals television ratings
- Stanley Cup Finals television ratings
- MLS Cup television ratings
