= Stanley Cup Final television ratings =

The following is an overview of the television ratings for the National Hockey League (NHL)'s Stanley Cup Final in both the United States and Canada.

== American television ==
View source data.

=== ABC/TNT's coverage (2022–) ===
The following table shows the ratings for each game of the Stanley Cup Final aired on ABC in even numbered years and on TNT in odd numbered years. The numbers in parentheses represent number of viewers (measured in millions).

Key to colors
Most viewers for each Game (1 through 7) or Average
Fewest viewers for each Game (1 through 7) or Average

Year	Network (Games)	Results	Avg.	1	2	3	4	5	6	7	Total
			Game Avg.	3.356M	3.25M	3.381M	3.415M	4.001M	5.027M	7.662M	
2026	ABC	Vegas Golden Knights 2, Carolina Hurricanes 4	2.53 (5.268M)	2.3 (4.675M)	2.4 (4.782M)	2.3 (5.046M)	2.6 (5.345M)	2.8 (5.840M)	2.8 (5.921M)	No Game	31.609M
2025	TNT truTV	Edmonton Oilers 2, Florida Panthers 4	1.5 (2.548M)	1.2 (2.42M)	1.3 (2.50M)	1.2 (2.30M)	1.3 (2.61M)	1.4 (2.70M)	1.4 (2.76M)	No Game	15.29M
2024	ABC	Edmonton Oilers 3, Florida Panthers 4	2.09 (4.166M)	1.6 (3.115M)	1.9 (3.558M)	1.8 (3.352M)	1.4 (3.085M)	2.1 (4.150M)	2.1 (4.237M)	3.7 (7.662M)	29.159M
2023	TNT; TBS (Games 1-4); TruTV	Florida Panthers 1, Vegas Golden Knights 4	1.3 (2.634M)	1.3 (2.753M)	1.3 (2.445M)	1.4 (2.688M)	1.3 (2.562M)	1.4 (2.721M)	No Game		13.169M
2022	ABC	Tampa Bay Lightning 2, Colorado Avalanche 4	2.31 (4.602M)	2.18 (4.200M)	1.70 (3.747M)	2.20 (4.103M)	2.44 (4.599M)	2.42 (5.145M)	2.89 (5.817M)	No Game	27.611M

=== NBC's coverage (2006–2021) ===
The following table shows the ratings for each game of the Stanley Cup Final. The numbers in parentheses represent number of viewers (measured in millions).

Year	Network (Games)	Results	Avg.	1	2	3	4	5	6	7	Total
			Game Avg.	3.745M	3.390M	2.612M	3.768M	4.719M	6.009M	7.636M	
2021	NBC (3, 4, 5); NBCSN (1, 2)	Tampa Bay Lightning 4, Montreal Canadiens 1	1.3 (2.405M)	0.8 (1.569M)	0.9 (1.649M)	1.2 (2.378M)	1.7 (2.92M)	1.9 (3.51M)	No Game		12.026M
2020	NBC (1, 4, 5, 6); NBCSN (2, 3)	Tampa Bay Lightning 4, Dallas Stars 2	1.0 (2.034M)	1.1 (2.115M)	0.6 (1.137M)	0.6 (1.145M)	1.3 (2.216M)	1.5 (2.713M)	1.7 (2.877M)	No Game	12.203M
2019	NBC (1, 4, 5, 6, 7); NBCSN (2, 3)	St. Louis Blues 4, Boston Bruins 3	3.0 (5.333M)	2.9 (5.251M)	2.0 (3.386M)	1.6 (2.930M)	3.1 (5.128M)	3.2 (5.443M)	3.6 (6.469M)	4.9 (8.723M)	37.33M
2018	NBC (1, 4, 5); NBCSN (2, 3)	Washington Capitals 4, Vegas Golden Knights 1	2.74 (4.786M)	2.9 (5.195M)	2.0 (3.648M)	1.9 (3.439M)	3.0 (5.061M)	3.9 (6.588M)	No Game		23.931M
2017	NBC (1, 4, 5, 6); NBCSN (2, 3)	Pittsburgh Penguins 4, Nashville Predators 2	2.7 (4.668M)	2.8 (4.854M)	1.8 (3.180M)	1.6 (2.953M)	3.2 (5.654M)	2.6 (4.382M)	3.9 (6.985M)	No Game	28.008M
2016	NBC (1, 4, 5, 6); NBCSN (2, 3)	Pittsburgh Penguins 4, San Jose Sharks 2	2.3 (4.005M)	2.3 (4.081M)	1.4 (2.507M)	1.5 (2.789M)	2.5 (4.234M)	3.0 (5.009M)	3.1 (5.407M)	No Game	24.027M
2015	NBC (1, 2, 5, 6); NBCSN (3, 4)	Chicago Blackhawks 4, Tampa Bay Lightning 2	3.2 (5.530M)	3.3 (5.547M)	3.9 (6.549M)	2.2 (3.896M)	2.2 (3.914M)	3.0 (5.267M)	4.4 (8.005M)	No Game	33.178M
2014	NBC (1, 2, 5); NBCSN (3, 4)	Los Angeles Kings 4, New York Rangers 1	3.0 (4.697M)	3.0 (4.777M)	3.7 (6.413M)	1.7 (2.893M)	2.0 (3.383M)	3.7 (6.021M)	No Game		23.487M
2013	NBC (1, 4, 5, 6); NBCSN (2, 3)	Chicago Blackhawks 4, Boston Bruins 2	3.3 (5.762M)	3.9 (6.358M)	2.0 (3.964M)	2.3 (4.001M)	3.8 (6.459M)	3.2 (5.632M)	4.7 (8.160M)	No Game	34.574M
2012	NBC (1, 2, 5, 6); NBCSN (3, 4)	Los Angeles Kings 4, New Jersey Devils 2	1.8 (2.979M)	1.8 (2.900M)	1.7 (2.900M)	1.0 (1.743M)	1.2 (2.069M)	2.0 (3.331M)	3.1 (4.930M)	No Game	17.873M
2011	NBC (1, 2, 5, 6, 7); Versus (3, 4)	Boston Bruins 4, Vancouver Canucks 3	2.7 (4.564M)	2.7 (4.562M)	2.2 (3.569M)	1.6 (2.757M)	1.6 (2.714M)	2.6 (4.319M)	3.2 (5.484M)	4.8 (8.540M)	31.948M
2010	NBC (1, 2, 5, 6); Versus (3, 4)	Chicago Blackhawks 4, Philadelphia Flyers 2	3.1 (5.196M)	2.8 (4.428M)	4.1 (5.892M)	2.0 (3.600M)	1.7 (3.126M)	3.3 (5.848M)	4.7 (8.279M)	No Game	31.173M
2009	NBC (1, 2, 5, 6, 7); Versus (3, 4)	Pittsburgh Penguins 4, Detroit Red Wings 3	2.7 (4.905M)	2.4 (4.300M)	3.1 (5.386M)	1.7 (2.955M)	1.8 (3.448M)	2.4 (4.446M)	3.4 (5.814M)	4.3 (7.992M)	34.341M
2008	NBC (3, 4, 5, 6); Versus (1, 2)	Detroit Red Wings 4, Pittsburgh Penguins 2	2.6 (4.345M)	1.2 (2.352M)	1.3 (2.608M)	2.4 (4.041M)	2.3 (4.044M)	3.8 (6.247M)	4.0 (6.779M)	No Game	26.071M
2007	NBC (3, 4, 5); Versus (1, 2)	Anaheim Ducks 4, Ottawa Senators 1	1.2 (1.735M)	0.5 (769K)	0.4 (576K)	1.1 (1.631M)	1.9 (2.797M)	1.8 (2.902M)	No Game		8.675M
2006	NBC (3, 4, 5, 6, 7); OLN (1, 2)	Carolina Hurricanes 4, Edmonton Oilers 3	1.8 (2.780M)	0.6 (861K)	0.5 (875K)	1.6 (2.542M)	2.6 (3.127M)	2.5 (3.850M)	1.9 (2.921M)	3.3 (5.290M)	19.466M
2005	Series cancelled due to 2004–05 NHL lockout										

=== ABC's coverage (2000–2004) ===
Year	Teams	Games Carried	Rating
2004	Tampa Bay Lightning–Calgary Flames	3, 4, 5, 6, 7	2.6
2003	New Jersey Devils–Mighty Ducks of Anaheim	3, 4, 5, 6, 7	2.9
2002	Detroit Red Wings–Carolina Hurricanes	3, 4, 5	3.6
2001	Colorado Avalanche–New Jersey Devils	3, 4, 5, 6, 7	3.3
2000	New Jersey Devils–Dallas Stars	3, 4, 5, 6	3.7

=== Fox's coverage (1995–1999) ===
Year	Teams	Games Carried	Rating
1999	Dallas Stars–Buffalo Sabres	1, 2, 5	3.4
1998	Detroit Red Wings–Washington Capitals	1	3.3
1997	Detroit Red Wings–Philadelphia Flyers	1	4.0
1996	Colorado Avalanche–Florida Panthers	1, 3	3.6
1995	New Jersey Devils–Detroit Red Wings	1, 4	3.4

=== Most watched games in the U.S. ===
==== Most watched Stanley Cup Final games (1966–present) ====
1. May 18, 1971, Montreal-Chicago – game seven, 12.41 million, 20.6 rating CBS
2. May 11, 1972, Boston-NY Rangers – game six, 10.93 million, 17.6 rating CBS
3. May 10, 1973, Montreal-Chicago – game six, 9.41 million, 15.2 rating NBC
4. June 12, 2019, St. Louis-Boston - game seven, 8.72 million, 4.9 rating NBC
5. June 15, 2011, Boston-Vancouver – game seven, 8.54 million, 4.8 rating, 8 share NBC
6. April 30, 1972, NY Rangers-Boston – game one, 8.51 million, 13.7 rating CBS
7. May 12, 1974, Boston-Philadelphia – game three, 8.30 million, 12.5 rating NBC
8. June 9, 2010, Chicago-Philadelphia – game six, 8.28 million, 4.7 rating, 6 share, NBC
9. May 7, 1972, Boston-NY Rangers – game four, 8.26 million, 13.3 rating CBS
10. June 24, 2013, Chicago-Boston — game six, 8.16 million, 4.7 rating, NBC
11. June 15, 2015, Chicago-Tampa Bay – game six, 8 million, 4.4 rating, 8 share, NBC

==== Stanley Cup game seven viewership history (1966–present) ====
As per Fang's Bites.

1. May 18, 1971, Montreal-Chicago, 12.41 million, 20.6 rating CBS
2. June 12, 2019, St. Louis-Boston, 8.72 million, 4.9 rating, NBC
3. June 15, 2011, Boston-Vancouver, 8.54 million, 4.8 rating, NBC
4. June 12, 2009, Pittsburgh-Detroit, 7.99 million, 4.3 rating, NBC
5. June 24, 2024, Edmonton-Florida, 7.66 million, 4.1 rating, ABC
6. June 9, 2003, Anaheim-New Jersey, 7.17 million, 4.9 million households, 4.6 rating, ABC
7. June 9, 2001, New Jersey-Colorado, 6.95 million, 4.268 million households, 4.2 rating, ABC
8. June 7, 2004, Calgary-Tampa Bay, 6.29 million, 4.5 million households, 4.2 rating, ABC
9. June 14, 1994, NY Rangers-Vancouver, 5.44 million, 3.28 million households, 5.2 rating (6.9 rating when including MSG network), ESPN
10. June 19, 2006, Edmonton-Carolina, 5.29 million, 3.3 rating, NBC
11. May 31, 1987, Edmonton-Philadelphia, 2.14 million households, 5.0 rating, ESPN

== Canadian television ==
- 2021 – The series averaged 3.6 million viewers on CBC and Sportsnet, making it the most watched Finals in Canada since 2011.
- 2011 – Game seven was second most-watched CBC Sports program, drawing an average of 8.76 million viewers and trailing only the men's gold medal game at the 2002 Winter Olympics.
- 2010 – Game one was viewed by 3.164 million people on CBC. Game six was the most-watched All-American Stanley Cup Final game, with 4.077 million viewers. The Final averaged 3.107 million viewers, up 44 percent from 2009.
- 2009 – Game seven drew an average of 3.529 million viewers to the CBC. However, it averaged 2.154 million viewers for the seven-game rematch, down 7% from the 2008 final.
- 1994 – With an average Canadian audience of 4.957 million viewers, game seven was the most watched CBC Sports program until the 10.6 million viewers for the men's ice hockey gold medal game between Canada and the United States at the 2002 Winter Olympics, when Canada won its first Olympic ice hockey gold medal since the 1952 Winter Olympics. Bob Cole said that Game 7 was one of his most memorable TV games.

== See also ==
- Super Bowl television ratings
- World Series television ratings
- NBA Finals television ratings
- MLS Cup television ratings
